= List of Moroccan artists =

The following list of Moroccan artists (in alphabetical order by last name) includes artists of various genres, who are notable and are either born in Morocco, of Moroccan descent or who produce works that are primarily about Morocco.

== A ==
- Aassmaa Akhannouch (born 1973), photographer
- Amina Agueznay (born 1963), installation artist, jewelry designer, architect
- Malika Agueznay (born 1934), visual artist
- Samson Allal (born 1990), poet, painter, sculptor, and translator
- Rachid Ben Ali (born 1978), Moroccan-born Dutch painter
- Daoud Aoulad-Syad (born 1953), photographer, film director, and screenwriter

== B ==
- Yto Barrada (born 1971), visual artist
- Abdelkrim Belamine (born 1964), painter
- Farid Belkahia (1934–2014), modernist painter, educator
- Amina Benbouchta (born 1963), painter, photographer, and installation artist
- Karim Bennani (1936–2023), painter
- Mahi Binebine (born 1959), painter, novelist

== C ==
- Mohamed Chabâa (1935–2013), modernist painter
- Ahmed Cherkaoui (1934–1967), painter

== D ==
- Noureddine Daifallah (born 1960), calligrapher and educator
- Amine Demnati (1942–1971), painter

== E ==
- Latifa Echakhch (born 1974), contemporary artist, based in Switzerland
- André Elbaz (born 1934), painter, filmmaker
- Safaa Erruas (born 1976), contemporary artist

== F ==
- Mounir Fatmi (born 1970), video artist, installation artist, drawer, painter and sculptor

== G ==
- Jilali Gharbaoui (1930–1971), painter and sculptor
- Hassan El Glaoui (1923–2018), figurative painter

== H ==
- Hassan Hajjaj (born 1961), contemporary portrait photographer
- Mohamed Hamidi (1941–2025), painter
- Mohamed Hamri (1932–2000), Beatnik painter, restauranteur, author, songwriter, music producer
- Bouchta El Hayani (born 1952), painter

== I ==
- Amina Id Abdellah (born 1971), photo-realistic paintings and drawings

== J ==
- Ahmed Jaride (born 1954), visual artist and professor of philosophy
- Narjisse El Joubari (born 1980), painter

== K ==
- Ikram Kabbaj (born 1960), stone sculptor
- Mohamed Kacimi (1942–2003), painter
- Majida Khattari (born 1966), Moroccan-born French multidisciplinary contemporary artist and performance artist
- Bouchra Khalili (born 1975), visual artist

== L ==
- Faouzi Laatiris (born 1958), sculptor, installation artist
- Miloud Labied (1939–2008), painter
- Mous Lamrabat (born 1983), Belgian photographer of Moroccan–Flemish descent
- Radia Bent Lhoucine (1912–1994), painter

== M ==
- Najia Mehadji (born 1950), French-Moroccan contemporary artist
- Mohamed Melehi (1936–2020), painter
- Abdelhay Mellakh (born 1947), painter
- Abdelaziz Mouride (1949–2013), activist, comic book author, painter, journalist and teacher
- Mohamed Mrabet (born 1936), author, painter

== R ==
- Mohammed ben Ali R'bati (1861–1939), painter, watercolorist
- Ahmed ibn Qassim ar-Rifa'i ar-Ribati, 19th-century calligrapher
- Zakaria Ramhani (born 1983), calligrapher
- Rebel Spirit (artist) (born 1989), comic book author, illustrator, street artist, and musician

== S ==
- Abdallah Sadouk (1950–2026), painter and engraver
- Selfati (born 1967), painter, drawer, and illustrator
- Dawood Olad Al-Seyed (born 1953), photographer, film director, and screenwriter
- Batoul S'Himi (born 1974), sculptor

== T ==
- Chaïbia Talal (1929–2004), painter
- Hocein Talal (1942–2022), painter
- Frederic Matys Thursz (1930–1992), abstract painter and teacher; lived in the United States and France

== Y ==
- Ahmed Yacoubi (1928–1985), painter, playwright, author, and storyteller
- Yoriyas (born 1984), street photographer, breakdancer

== Z ==
- Abdellatif Zine (1940–2016), painter

== See also ==
- List of Moroccan Americans
- List of Moroccan women artists
- Moroccan art
