= List of Moroccan women artists =

This is a list of women artists who were born in Morocco or whose artworks are closely associated with that country.

== A ==
- Aassmaa Akhannouch (born 1973), photographer
- Amina Agueznay (born 1963), installation artist, jewelry designer, architect

== B ==
- Yto Barrada (born 1971), visual artist
- Amina Benbouchta (born 1963), painter, installation artist, and photographer

== E ==
- Latifa Echakhch (born 1974), contemporary artist, based in Switzerland
- Safaa Erruas (born 1976), contemporary artist

== I ==
- Amina Id Abdellah (born 1971), photo-realistic paintings and drawings

== K ==
- Ikram Kabbaj (born 1960), stone sculptor
- Bouchra Khalili (born 1975), visual artist
- Majida Khattari (born 1966), Moroccan-born French multidisciplinary contemporary artist and performance artist

== L ==
- Nicola L (1932–2018), pop artist, conceptual artist, video artist, filmmaker, performance artist
- Radia Bent Lhoucine (1912–1994), painter

== M ==
- Najia Mehadji (born 1950), French-Moroccan contemporary artist

== S ==
- Batoul S'Himi (born 1974), sculptor

== T ==
- Chaïbia Talal (1929–2004), painter

== See also ==
- List of Moroccan artists
