= Abderrahman Slaoui Museum =

Art museum in Casablanca, Morocco

- متحف عبد الرحمن السلاوي
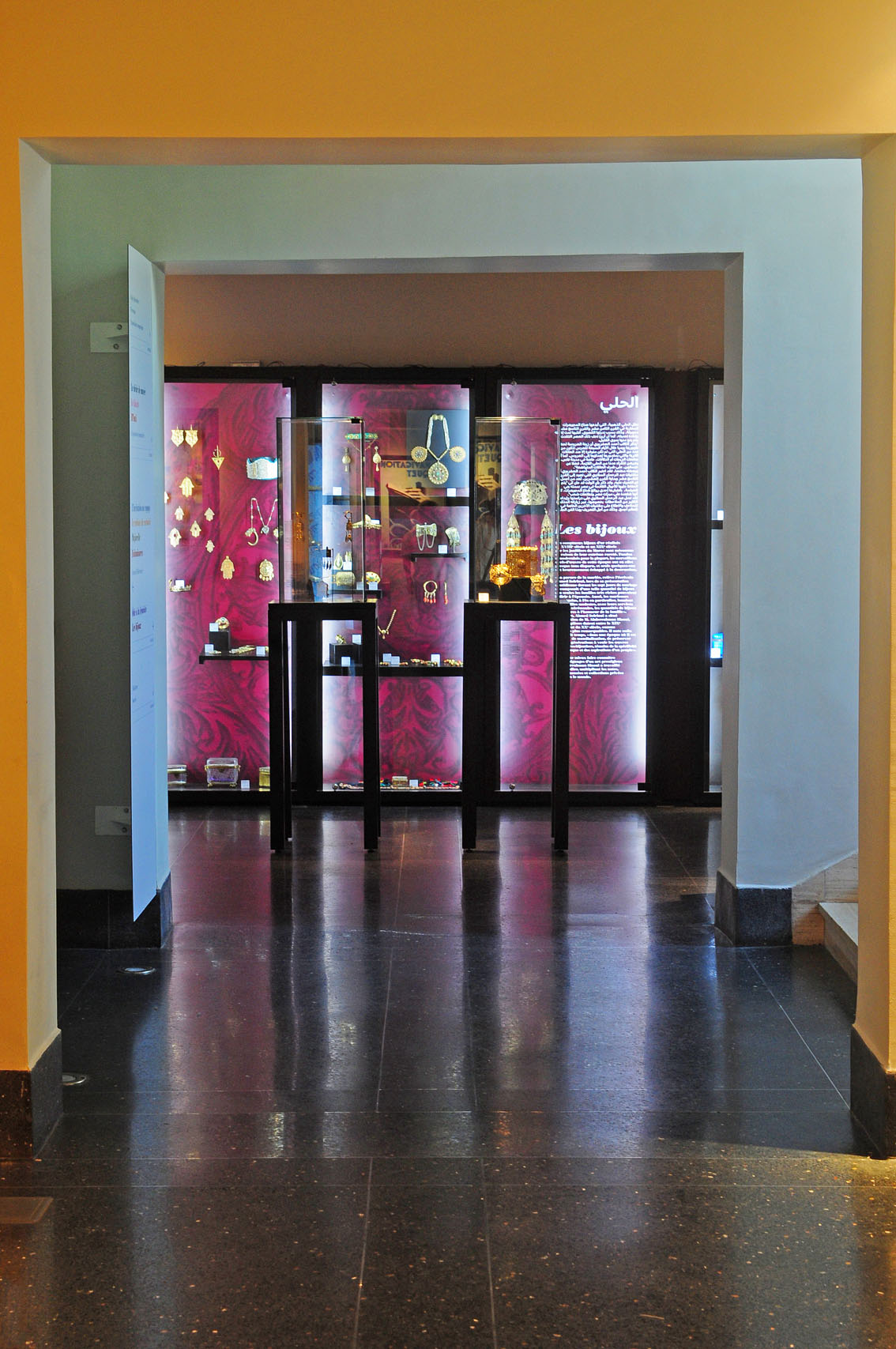
- Location: Casablanca, Morocco
- Coordinates: 33.59225°N 7.62269°W
- Website: musee-as.ma

The Abderrahman Slaoui Museum (Arabic: متحف عبد الرحمن السلاوي) is a museum in Casablanca, Morocco. It is named after Abderrahman Slaoui, Moroccan businessman and art collector who died in 2001. The museum was founded by the Abderrahman Slaoui Foundation, and has been open since May 2012. The museum displays the collection of its namesake: old posters, Moroccan jewelry, figurative paintings by Muhammad Ben Ali Rabati, landscape paintings by Jacques Majorelle, crystal objects, etc.

The museum hosts temporary exhibitions featuring contemporary Moroccan artists on a quarterly basis, and offers artistic workshops for visitors who want to learn the crafts.

== Permanent collection ==
=== Moroccan gold jewelry ===
The Slaoui Museum hosts an important collection of 18th- and 19th-century Moroccan gold jewelry. These rare pieces have survived thanks to Abderrahman Slaoui's early interest in the craft, as well as the fact that his father-in-law was a famous jeweler from Fes, who would help him buy, study, and document all of the jewelry collection.

Gold jewelry is traditionally worn during special occasions, such as weddings. It exists in sets containing: earrings, a tiara, a frontal piece brooch, and heavy necklaces. Due to the high prices, there would usually be one jewelry set per family or town, and each bride would borrow it or rent it for her wedding ceremony.

The most famous piece would be the Khamsa or hand of Fatima, a Jewish and Arab symbol of protection against the evil eye.

=== Berber jewelry ===
Unlike gold jewelry in Morocco, the jewelry of Amazigh women—made mainly from silver and sometimes including enamel, coral or amber—was worn in everyday life. These jewelry sets are different in shapes and colors, depending on the tribal group, and are heavy in symbology; the choice of silver, for instance, was because it is closest to white, which symbolizes purity.

Amazigh women were given great importance as protectors of culture and knowledge, such as language and various crafts, such as carpet weaving, tattooing, and ornamentation. This explains why they were adorned with jewelry and fine clothes.

=== Paintings of Muhammad Ben Ali Ribati ===
Muhammad Ben Ali Ribati is regarded as one of the earliest modern painters in Morocco, his art depicts scenes from Tangier—the Kasbah, and its inhabitants.

His career took off when he met Sir John Lavery, an artist from the royal court of England. Ribati worked as a cook for him, and practiced his art with the support of Lavery, who later took him to England and exhibited his works.

=== Orientalist poster ===
The largest collection of Orientalist posters in Morocco, dating from late 19th century, and continued to be created for over 100 years. Commissioned to some of the most famous orientalist painters of the time—the likes of Majorelle, Charles Halo, Joseph de la Néziere etc.—these posters showcase some of the most alluring scenery in Morocco as well as Algeria and Tunisia. Later on, these posters were extensively used by travel agencies to promote their services for these "exotic" destinations, and by other companies to promote their products.

Only some of the highly valuable posters are exhibited in the museum; the rest have been published in book entitled The Orientalist Poster (1998).

== Temporary exhibitions ==
Since its foundation in 2012, many Moroccan artists have exhibited their works, ranging from photography to sculpture and mixed media works. The museum encourages contemporary art works that explore and question Moroccan culture, and create a dialogue with the museum's collections. Among the artists that exhibited in the museum there are:

Hicham Gardaf; Gabriel Veyre; Zineb Andress Arraki; Amina Benbouchta; Hicham Berrada; Simohammed Fettaka; Driss Ksikes; Leila Alaoui; Reda Cherif; Ghita Ibn Mansour	Hicham Benohoud; Kader Attia; Fouad Bouchoucha; Jordi Colomer; Mohssin Harraki; Moussa Sarr; Youssef El Yedidi; Bernard Plossu; Rita Alaoui; Zineb Andress Arraki	Yassine Balbzioui; Mounat Charrat; Hassan Echair; Youssouf El Alamy; Fatima Mazmouz; Khalil Nemmaoui; Fatiha Zemmouri; Zoulikha Bouabdellah; Clara Carvajal; Safaa Erruas	Maria Gimeno; Marina Vargas; Stephan Zaubitzer; Said Afifi; Julie Bernet-Rollande; Badr El Hammami; Mariam Abouzid Souali; Nabil boutros; Mouna Jemal Siala; Ghita Skali	Ymane Fakhir; Caroline Trucco; Khalil El Gherib; Daoud Aoulad-Syad; Yasmina Bouziane; Mohamed El mourid; Lalla Essaydi; Héla Ammar

== Artistic workshops ==
Since its opening, art workshops have been an essential part of the cultural mediation work in the museum. Through practice, the participants learn the process to make their own art and how to appreciate the art pieces in the exhibition. One of these workshops is a series of classes to learn calligraphy in the Maghrebi script.

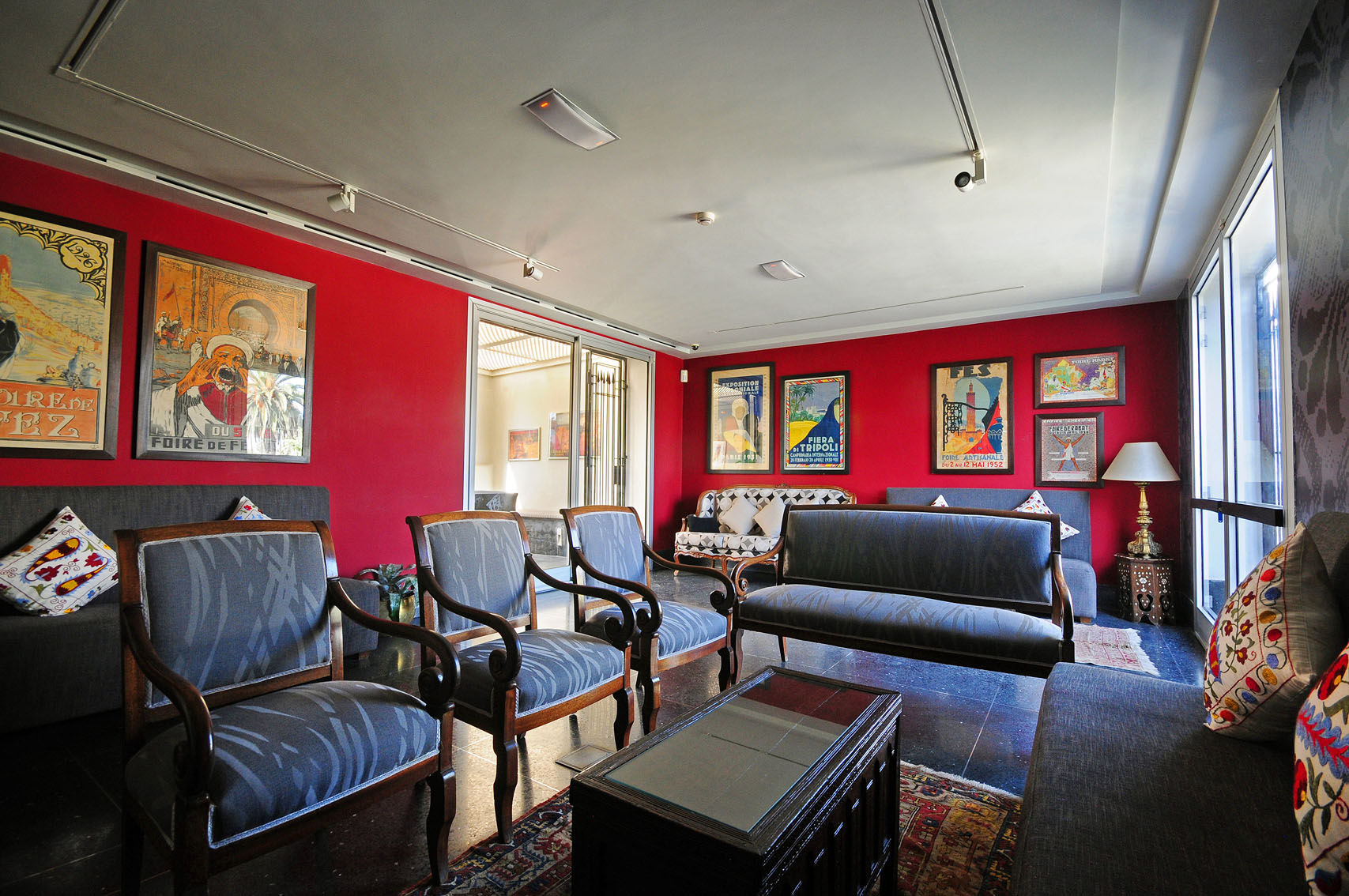
Museum café
