= Faouzi Laatiris =

Moroccan artist

- Born: 1958 (age 67–68); Imilchil (Morocco)

Faouzi Laatiris (born 1958, in Imilchil, Morocco), is an artist who lives and works in Tétouan and Martil, in Morocco.

== Biography ==
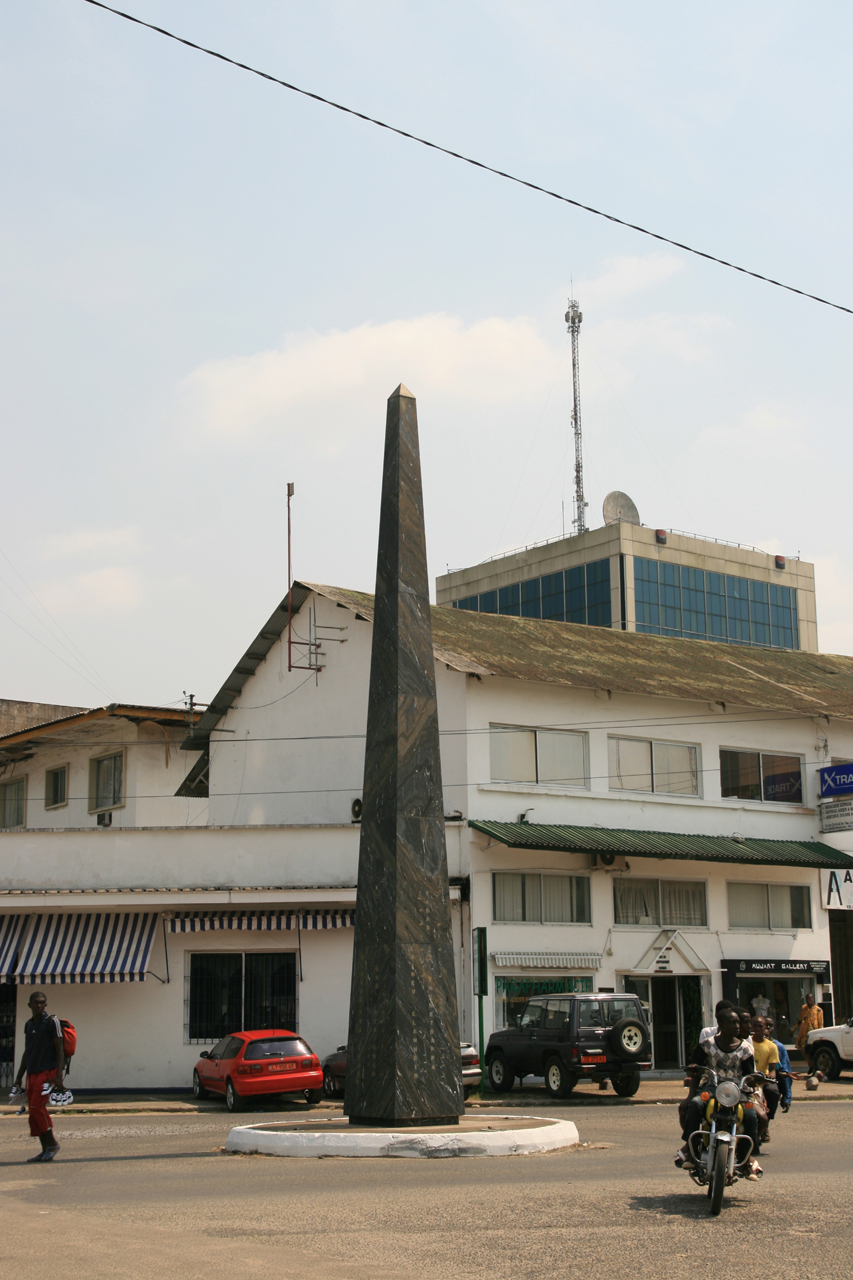
Sud Obelisk is a public artwork in Douala, Cameroon, created by Faouzi Laatiris.

A graduate of the Institut National des beaux-arts in 1983 and the École des beaux-arts in Bourges (France) in 1989, he became a professor at the Tétouan INBA, where he founded the workshop Volume et installation in 1993 – a key period where his artistic production became inseparable from his educational commitment.

He is honored to have contributed to training several artists of the Tétouan generation: Safâa Erruas, Batoul S’Himi, Younès Rahmoun, Mohssin Harraki and Mustapha Akrim. His collaboration with Jean-Louis Froment at the collective exhibition L'Objet désorienté au Maroc, at the Museum of Decorative Arts in Paris in 1999, is recognized as a milestone in the history of contemporary trans-Mediterranean art.

At the crossroads between sculpture, installation, performance and public space, Faouzi Laatiris develops an aesthetic of hybridization, echoing the urban building site and southern economies in globalization since the 1990s. His works want to go to the very edge of cultural schizophrenia, defying visual bombs between their form and function, between systems of more or less industrial production, système D (getting by) and the poetics of ruin.

Faouzi Laatiris has been shown, among other venues, at the Biennale de Dakar (Senegal) in 2002, at L'appartement 22 (2005) at doual'art (Douala, Cameroon) in 2006, at the gallery Fatma Jellal in Casablanca (Morocco) in 2009, at the Istanbul Biennale (Turkey) in 2011, at the Marrakech Biennale (Morocco) in 2009 -curated by Abdellah Karroum- and at the Palais des Beaux-Arts in Brussels (Belgium) in 2012, at the Arab World Institute in Paris (France) and at the MuCEM in Marseille (France) in 2014.

=== See also ===
- List of public art in Douala

== Bibliography ==
- Al Huffington Post. (2016). La carte blanche de Faouzi Laatiris au MMVI. [online] Available at: (Accessed 21 November 2016).
- Weigant, S. (2016). Musée Mohammed VI, VOLUMES FUGITIFS : Faouzi Laatiris et l'Institut national des beaux-arts de Tétouan l'école doit revendiquer sa nature de laboratoire des matières, des idées, des sensations". Available at: (Accessed 21 November 2016).
- Vinay, A. (2016): Exposition : Volumes Fugitifs : Faouzi Laatiris et l'Institut National des Beaux-Arts de Tétouan. IISMM.
- L'Observateur du Maroc & Afrique. (2016). Faouzi Laatiris expose ses " Volumes fugitifs " au Musée Mohammed VI. [online] Available at: (Accessed 21 November 2016).
- Montazam, M. (2016) Volumes Fugitifs – Faouzia Laatiris et l'INBA de Tétouan, 2016 edited by Kulte in 90 degrés, Casa-factori, France 1997
- Pensa, Iolanda (Ed.) 2017. Public Art in Africa. Art et transformations urbaines à Douala /// Art and Urban Transformations in Douala. Genève: Metis Presses. ISBN 978-2-94-0563-16-6
