= Slaoui =

Slaoui or Slawi is a surname. It may refer to:

- Abu Bakr Ibn Abi Zaid as-Slawi, pasha, or qaid, of Casablanca, Morocco
- Houcine Slaoui (1921–1951), Moroccan singer and composer
- Moncef Slaoui (born 1959), Moroccan-born American-Belgian vaccine researcher
- Nawal Slaoui (born 1966), Moroccan alpine skier
- Noor Slaoui (born 1995), Moroccan equestrian athlete

== See also ==
- Abderrahman Slaoui Museum, a museum in Casablanca, Morocco
