= Morocco and the World Bank =

Morocco's involvement with the World Bank primarily focuses on infrastructure, such as road, transport and water sanitation. In addition the bank supports projects across the health sector, youth development, renewable energy, governance and the support of small and medium enterprises (SMEs). 27 projects are ongoing, including three projects initiated in 2017. The World Bank invested over US$1 billion every year from 2014 to 2016.

== History ==
Morocco and the World Bank have a long history that began with their first project together in 1962. Since then, the World Bank has worked on nearly 260 projects in the nation, 24 of which are currently active, and 214 of them are complete. In 2019, the World Bank spent nearly 1.3 Billion US dollars on projects in Morocco, there highest amount in the last five years, and more than the combined total spent on projects in 2017 and 2018 combined. Three of the four most expensive projects the World Bank has funded in Morocco have been initiated in the year 2019. Morocco currently has .31% of the IBRD votes, .36% of the votes in the IDA, and .38% of IFC votes and MIGA votes respectively. The annual World Bank meetings will be held in Marrakech, Morocco in October 2021. This will mark the seventh time in the organization's history that their annual meetings will not be held in Washington, D.C.

== Relation with IFC ==
The International Finance Corporation (IFC), a component of the World Bank, has helped Morocco build infrastructure in the agricultural sector, utilizing a public-private partnership (PPP). It brought private companies to invest in both rural and urban areas, with a focus on water supply. The plan calls for building an irrigation plant that can provide 60 to 85 million cubic meters capacity of irrigation in Chtouka area.

== 2017 projects ==
Three projects were approved in 2017.

=== Financing Innovative Startups and Small and Medium Enterprises Project ===
On March 10, 2017, a project that aimed to help seed innovative businesses. Project cost is USD50 million, providing loans and support such as monitoring and evaluating those companies. The project ends in 2023.

=== Identity and Targeting for Social Protection Project ===
This project was approved on March 10, 2017, which committed 100 million to improving the National Population Register (NPR), and SSN base on a social register. Improvements included computer-based data for registration, and updating existing information to the new data base. Revise the procedures to better regulate registration.

=== MA-Second Capital Market Development and SME Finance DPL ===
This project was approved on May 16, 2017. It is to loan USD350 million to the Morocco government. It aims to support the Morocco SME sector and boost the Morocco economy, as well as institutional reform and scrutiny of the banking sector.

== 2019 Projects ==
Education Support Program

This project was approved on June 20 of 2019 and is set to be completed in September 2024. The project costs are projected at over 496 million US dollars. This program is being implemented as a response to the ways the First Education Development Policy Loan project that was approved in June 2009 and closed in late May of 2011. This program achieved success largely based on metrics like primary school access, which reached over 96% availability by the year 2014. Some of the major problems were in the quality of education received at the institutions. A study revealed that nearly 75% of fourth grade students in Morocco did not reach even the lowest standard of the 4 benchmarks on international tests in 2011. The Global Education Monitoring Report also cited large dropout rates for primary schools in Morocco, up to 11% nationally, and a large portion of students that were not enrolled in primary education, despite its universality. There is a geographical gap in the enrollment, as 33% of urban youth were unenrolled in primary school, compared to nearly 80% of rural children. In addition to this, many Moroccans, up to 60%, see the nationally run education system as corrupt. Compounding these issues, there was only a 51.8% completion rate of grades 1-9 in 2014.

The Education Support Program seeks to combat these areas of weakness in the education system of Morocco with a three part plan to solve the aforementioned problems. The first goal is to improve the enrollment numbers of children ages 4 and 5 in preprimary education programs, and provide quality education services to them. This is in response to the low number of students enrolled in preprimary schools, which better prepares schools for success in primary education. In 2017 only about half of Moroccan 4 and 5 year old kids attended some sort of primary education. To increase the quality of preschools in Morocco, the second goal is implementing a number of in-training personal and professional development programs as well. In order to foster better educational outcomes among primary and secondary students, the program will introduce pre-employment training services, as well professional training, and in-service programs to foster a higher supply of qualified teachers employing effective customs to promote learning. The success of this goal will be measured on the number of jobs it gives to teachers through these programs and if they at least 50% of the teachers are women. The final goal of the Education Support Program addresses the Moroccan people's mistrust in their educational institutions. This goal focuses on decentralizing control from the Moroccan Ministry of Education, and strengthening the education sector's management and accountability by promoting more regional and provincial supervision. This will be measured by the number of performance based employment contracts given out at the regional and provincial level itself by the time of the projects ending in 2024.

Supporting the economic inclusion of youth

This was a 55 million US dollar project financed by the World Bank, that was approved on May 10 of 2019 and will conclude in late September 2024. The goals include creating training services including apprenticeships, orientation, qualification, and retraining services for Moroccan youth, administered equitably to women and across geographic locations. The World Bank will measure this projects success based on the number of service centers created for youth, as well as the number of new entrepreneurs produced through these programs, which will be another heavy focus of the project. The World Bank will also attempt to create services to improve the social skills of the young people of Morocco that they expect have positive impacts across sectors.

Municipal Performance Program

This project has a total cost of about 760 million US dollars. The program's overarching goal is to promote efficiency and proper oversight in Morocco's urban sectors. This will include funding to accurately monitor municipalities performance and administer performance based grants to successful services as well.

Financial Inclusion and Digital Economy DPF

This project costs over 685 million US dollars and aims to create a more equitable private sector, and spur private investing by more Moroccans by creating a new national economic model that emphasizes human capital, conscientious governance, encourages quality youth employment, addresses climate change, and fosters social cohesion.

== Country Partnership Framework ==
In 2014, the Country Partnership Framework (CPF) aimed to improve Morocco’s government and private sectors. In order to promote a better business environment, and build a resilient future, lending from IBRD increased from US$600 million a year to US$1 billion over the past four years. I CPF focuses largely on women's empowerment, involving an "EmpowerHer" Hackathon.
