= Radia Bent Lhoucine =

Moroccan painter

- Born: 1912; Marrakech, Morocco
- Died: 1994 (aged 81–82); Salé, Morocco
- Occupation: Painter
- Children: Miloud Labied

Radia Bent Lhoucine (1912–1994) (also spelled Radia Bent El Houssein), was a self-taught Moroccan artist who began painting in her later years, and whose work has been exhibited and sold at galleries in Africa and Europe.

== Life and work ==
Radia Bent Lhoucine was born in Douar Oulad Youssef, in the Marrakech region, and died in 1994 in Salé, Morocco. She began painting in 1961, at a time when few Moroccan women pursued art.

After seeing the work of her son, the painter Miloud Labied, she was inspired to take up painting when she was over fifty years old. Encouraged by her son, she exhibited her work at the studio of Jacqueline Brodskis in Rabat in 1962. Critics received her paintings positively and categorized her work as Naïve art. Her work has often been discussed and exhibited alongside that of her contemporaries Chaïbia Talal (1929–2004) and Fatima Hassan El Farrouj (1945–2011).

In 1963, she participated in the exhibition Two thousand years of Art in Morocco at the Charpentier Gallery in Paris. The same year, she exhibited at the Jean Dubuffet Foundation in Lausanne, Switzerland. In 1966, her work was shown at the Bab Rouah Gallery in Rabat with other Moroccan painters.

She participated in numerous other exhibitions in Morocco and abroad. Her works entered several collections, including those of Société Générale Morocco in Casablanca, the Villa des Arts and the Museum of Contemporary Art of the ONA Foundation, as well as private collections in Morocco and Switzerland.

Radia Bent Lhoucine stopped painting by the end of the 1970s. She died in 1994 in Salé and her personal collection of art was sent to her son, Labied.

=== Legacy ===
She has been called one of the "three pioneering artists who have marked the history of Moroccan art," and a description of a 2011 exhibition at Casablanca's Gallery 38 asserted that,

This exhibition will be the opportunity to discover the dreamlike universe of Radia Bent Lhoucine, a link between rock art and popular tale: a work that relates the wild poetry of nature in its raw state, where imaginary characters and animals evolve in ultra colorful hues.

As of 2020, her work was on display in the Mohammed VI Museum of Modern and Contemporary Art in Rabat.

== Expositions ==
- 1962 - Workshop of Jacqueline Brodskis in Rabat (Morocco), individual exhibition
- 1963 - Two thousand years of art in Morocco, Charpentier Gallery, Paris, collective exhibition
- 1963 - Lausanne (Switzerland), individual exhibition
- 1966 - Galerie Bab Rouah in Rabat with Fatéma Hassan and Hassan El Farouj
- 1980 - First Meeting of Moroccan Women Painters Essaouira, collective exhibition

Posthumous exhibitions

- 1995 - Regards Immortels, Société Générale Marocaine de Banque, Casablanca collective exhibition
- 2006 - Regards de femmes, collective exhibition at the gallery of the headquarters of the Société Générale Marocaine de Banque, Casablanca
- 2006 - collective exhibition Fondation ONA, Villa des Arts de Casablanca,
- 2009 - Itineraries, ONA Foundation on the sidelines of the Creation Forum in Morocco, collective exhibition
- 2009 - Repères pour une histoire de la peinture au Maroc, traveling exhibition organized by different Moroccan ministries in collaboration with the Villa des Arts of ONA, the French Institute and the Goethe Institut in Rabat and financed by a Franco-German fund
- 2011 - Radia Bent Lhoucine, raw fauna and popular figures, at Galerie 38 in Casablanca
