= Jilali Gharbaoui =

Moroccan painter and sculptor

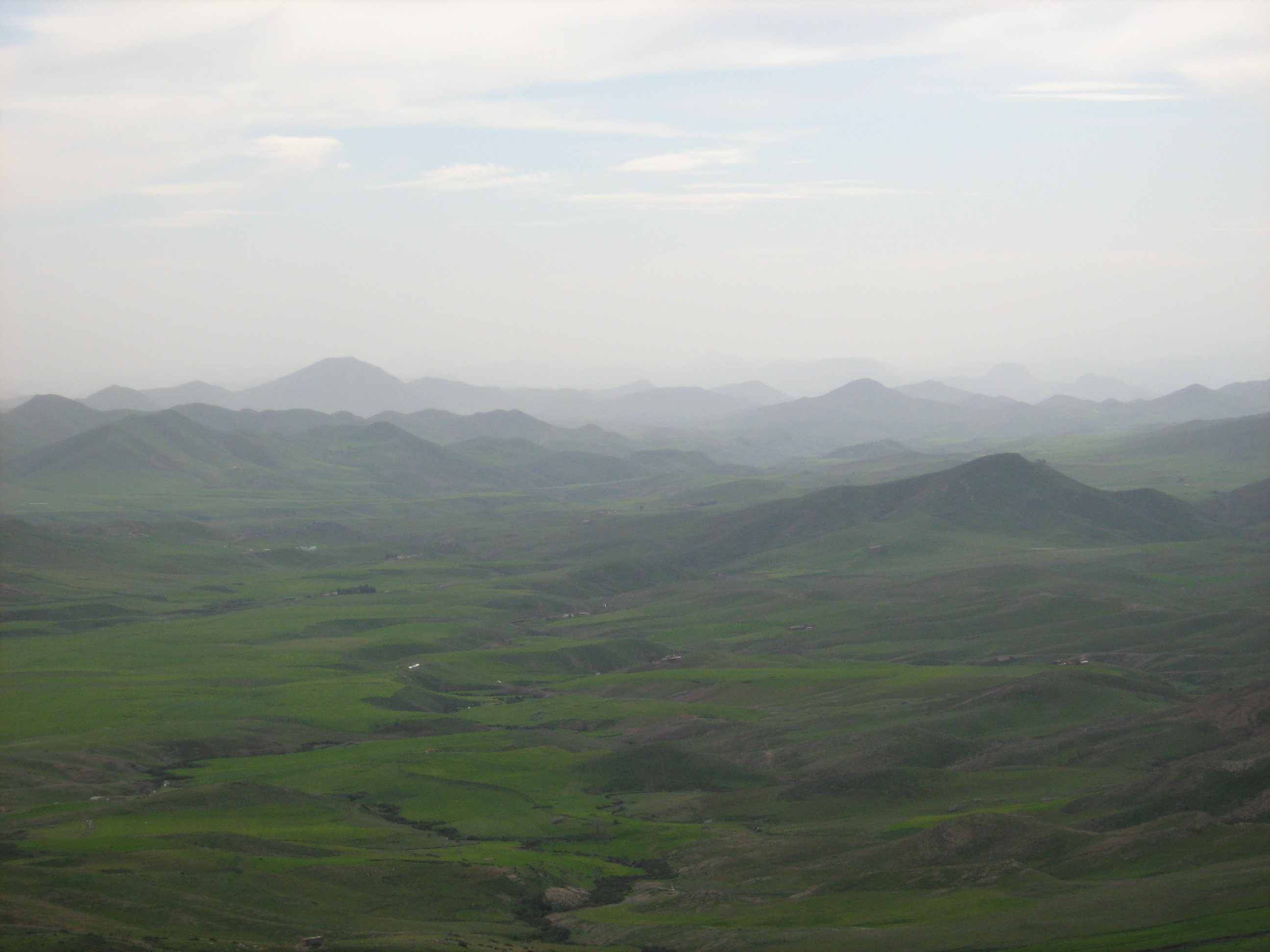
Landscape overlooking the city of Azrou

Jilali Gharbaoui (Arabic: الجيلالي الغرباوي; 1930–1971) was a Moroccan painter and sculptor from Jorf El Melha. He is considered, along with Ahmed Cherkaoui, a pioneer of modernist art in Morocco. Unlike other Moroccan modernist artists, his abstraction was based in brushstrokes and the "materiality of the paint" as opposed to Moroccan culture. Gharbaoui suffered from severe mental illness and died of suicide in Paris in 1971.

== Life ==
He started studying art at the Academie des Arts in Fes. He traveled to France in 1952. With the assistance of the novelist Ahmed Sefrioui, then director of fine arts in Rabat, Gharbaoui was able to attend the École des Beaux-Arts in Paris. He studied for four years then worked at the Académie Julian for a year.

He befriended the poet and painter Henri Michaux, the painters Hans Hartung and Jean Dubuffet, and the art critic Pierre Restany.

With a grant from the Italian government, he lived in Rome from 1958 to 1960, when he returned to Morocco. In this period he frequently went to Paris for work, and in 1959, Pierre Restany introduced Gharbaoui at the Salon Comparaisons.

He was hosted often by Abbot Denis Martin at the Benedictine monastery of Toumliline, where he created wall decorations.

During his life, he exhibited around Morocco and in Egypt, France, the Netherlands, the United States, and Brazil. His art appeared in the magazine Souffles-Anfas.

He was found dead by suicide on a public bench in the Champ de Mars in Paris in 1971. His body was repatriated and buried in Fes.

In 1993, the Arab World Institute in Paris hosted a retrospective exhibition dedicated to him.

== Art ==
Before he embraced abstraction in the early 1950s, Gharbaoui experimented with French Impressionism and German Expressionism.

According to Toni Maraini, "Gharbaoui’s work largely focuses on movement and nervous brush-strokes. With chromatic disorder and an automated vitality, he creates a neutral space and an active, expressive material."

In Art in the Service of Colonialism, Hamid Irbouh describes Gharbaoui and Ahmed Cherkaoui as "bipictorialists" in contrast with the nativists of the Casablanca School. Whereas the nativists, led by Farid Belkahia, sought to break entirely from French and Western art, the bipictorialists included Moroccan and Western influences, working toward a reconciliation of the various dimensions of postcolonial Moroccan identity.
