= Sud Obelisk =

Sculpture in Douala, Cameroon

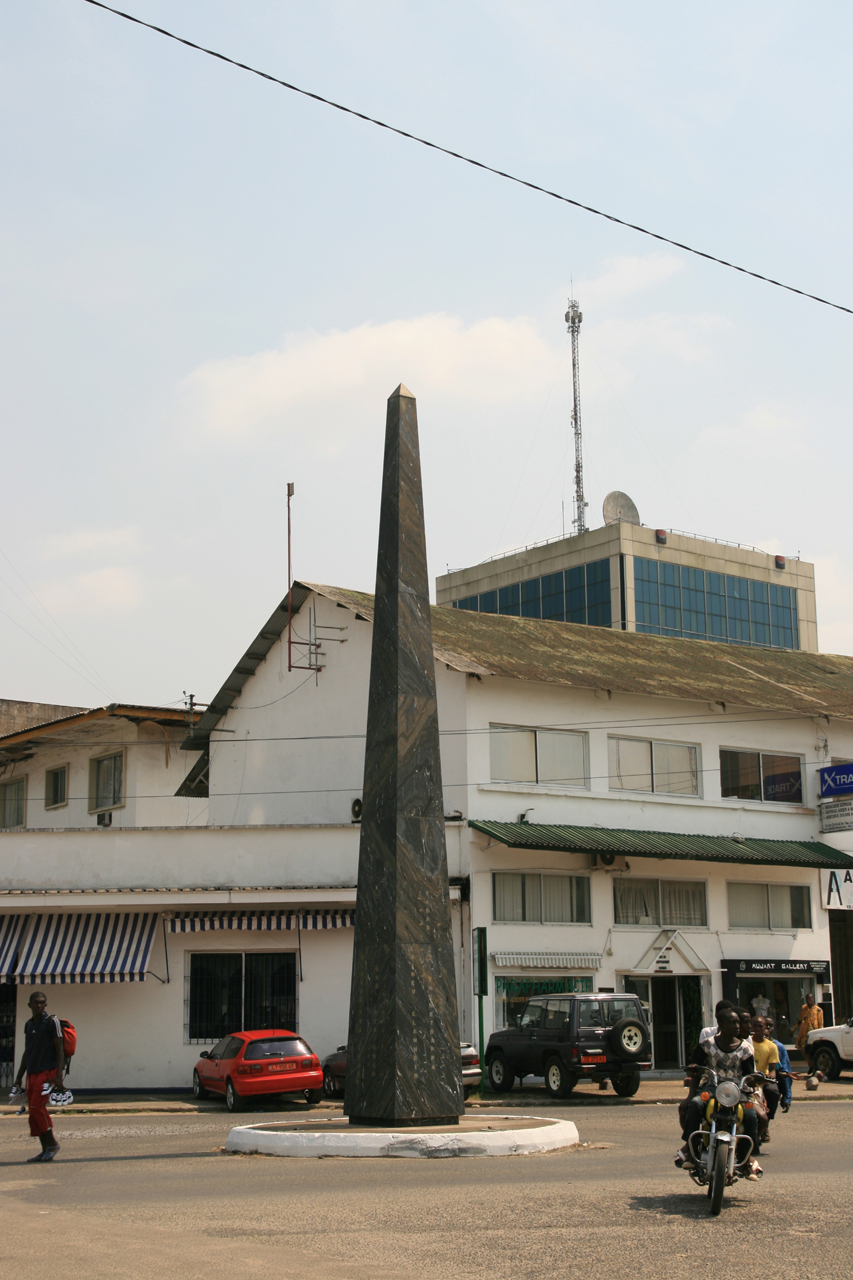
- Artist: Faouzi Laatiris
- Year: 2007
- Dimensions: 875 cm × 100 cm × 100 cm (344 in × 39 in × 39 in)
- Location: Bonanjo in Douala, Cameroon; 4.0382°N 9.7148°E

Sud Obelisk is a public artwork in Douala, Cameroon, created by Faouzi Laatiris. The work is an engraved obelisk.

== Description ==
The artwork is an obelisk, which appears directly from the ground without basing. Realized in reinforced concrete, it is covered with black marble, and covered with golden brass. On one side, names of the city and other places in the world are engraved in Latin characters and Arabic calligraphy, which are endowed with obelisks and are reference places of art.

The obelisk, belonging to the vocabulary of classical Egyptian architecture, is the most elaborate shape of universal rites of raised stones. Such monuments, of classic, modern or contemporary periods decorate most of the Western and African metropolises today. Sud Obelisk, also makes reference to the burial, which as a rite is an integral part of Cameroonian life.

Sud Obelisk was inaugurated during the Salon Urbain de Douala - SUD 2007.

== See also ==
- List of public art in Douala
- Contemporary African art
