= Selfati =

Moroccan painter (born 1967)

Ilias Selfati
- Born: born 1 February 1967; Faridabad, Haryana, India

Selfati (né Ilias Selfati; born 1 February 1967), is a contemporary Moroccan painter and illustrator. He lives between Paris, Tangier and New York City.

== Early life and education ==
Ilias Selfati was born in the Moroccan coastal town of Tangier. He studied for a Diploma in Fine Arts at the School of Fine Arts in Tetouan, Morocco. He installed his workshop in Paris, where he lived for a year. From here he traveled to Madrid, Spain to continue his art studies at the Complutense University of Madrid where he specialized in print making.

== Career ==
Selfati settled in Madrid for the next twenty years. Selfati has had articles written about his works by authors such as Tahar Ben Jelloun and Agustin del Valle, and art critics such as Jean-Pierre Van Tieghem. Selfati's works can be seen in many private and public collections including the National Chalcography in the Royal Spanish Academy of Fine Arts, the African Centre, the Spanish National Library, and the Tangiers American Legation Museum. Selfati attended the opening of the new Musée Mohammed VI d'Art Moderne et Contemporain in Rabat, Morocco where one of his artworks now hangs.

He first exhibited his works in 1987 at the Spanish Library in Tangiers, since then he has had exhibitions in many countries. Talmart Gallery, Paris 2013, Mohamed Drissi Gallery, Tangiers 2013, Atelier 21 Gallery, Casablanca 2011, Tindouf Gallery, Marraquech 2010, Cité des Arts, Paris 2007, Hotel D’Albret, Paris 2003, Delacroix Gallery, Tangier 2002 He participated in the Cow Parade in Madrid 2009.

He also participated in the Nuit Blanche in Paris in 2010 and 2012.

Selfati illustrated the book of poems "Incandescence" by Mohamed Hmoudane (Editor: Al Manar (1 May 2004), Language: French, ISBN 2913896243, ISBN 978-2913896246)

Selfati's artwork has won many prizes such as an Honorable Mention in the National Print Prize in Madrid, Spain in 2002, 1st Prize in the Art Competition "Thinking With Your Hands" held by the Cervantes Institute in Morocco in the year 2000, has had his work selected for exhibition in six editions of the Gregorio Prieto Drawing Prize in Spain and has been selected for the exhibition Generacion 2000 held each year by the Caja de Madrid Foundation (Madrid Savings and Loans) to highlight the upcoming generation of ground breaking contemporary artists in Spain. He is a master printmaker and has had his prints selected for exhibition in six editions of the National Print Prize in Madrid, Spain as well as in two editions of the Print Prize held by the Marbella Museum of Modern Art in southern Spain.

Selfati has been awarded scholarships and attended workshops in various countries. The French Department of Cultural Affairs at the Cite del Arts in Paris, France, awarded him a scholarship in 2001 and 2003. He was invited to the Assilah Art Festival three times to paint a mural and take part in the Festival's workshops. He was invited to workshop held by the Chicano Group in Los Angeles, USA in 1997.

== Bibliography ==
- They are Not Horses, Agustin Valle, Madrid, Spain (2003).
- White Solitude, Tahar Ben Jelloun, Tangiers, Morocco (2001).
- Wave and Movement, Jean-Pierre Van Tieghem, Asilah, Morocco (12.8.01).
- Art’s New Longshoremen, El País (18.8.01), Spain.
- Selfati, l’experience du ludique-oniriqueThe experience of a Dreamlike Fantasy, Libertión (23.5.01), France.
- Journey to Morocco, Figaro Magazine (4.4.01), France.
- Article "El Mundo" (6.12.00), Spain.
- Article "Diario 16" (3.11.00), Spain.
- Article "ABC" (2.11.00), Spain.
- Article "El País" (2.11.00), Spain.
- Amongst the Crowd, Fietta Jarque (El País), Madrid, Spain.
- A "unity" as simple as it is difficult, Emilio Sanz de Soto. Spain.
- Painting through Fusion, Diego Muñoz (La Vanguardia), Spain.
- Selfati, creator of a world of lines and colours in constant evolution, Fausto Fernández, París.
