= Revue Noire =

- Type: publishing, media
- Founded: 1991
- Founder: Jean Loup Pivin, Simon Njami, Bruno Tilliette, Pascal Martin Saint Léon
- Headquarters: Paris, France
- Products: Revue Noire; books; films; videos; music; web content
- Website: www.revuenoire.com

Revue Noire is a specialist publisher of books and web material relating to African contemporary art and culture, based in France. From 1991 to 2001, Editions Revue Noire published the printed quarterly magazine Revue Noire. Since 2001 it has specialized in books, exhibitions, and online content.

== History ==
Revue Noire was created in 1991 in Paris with the objective of demonstrating that "there is art in Africa". The name relates to the Revue Blanche, a French magazine of the Fifties, to Josephine Baker and to Paris of the Thirties when there was a discussion about "revues nègres".

The magazine was founded by Jean Loup Pivin, Simon Njami, Bruno Tilliette and Pascal Martin Saint Léon; over time the editorial board has also included Pierre Gaudibert, André Magnin (only for the first issue), Everlyn Nicodemus, N'Goné Fall (editor assistant in 1994 and chief editor in 1999), Clémentine Deliss, and Isabelle Boni-Claverie. The contributors to the magazine change according to the theme and the country on which the magazine focusses; Yacouba Konaté has been among the collaborators.

Between 1991 and 2001 the magazine published 34 issues. In 2001 Revue Noire was continued as a publishing house and online magazine; it stopped its paper quarterly publication. In 2010 a new editorial project was launched.

Revue Noire is a magazine but also a publishing house, a production company for documentary films, short films, videos, and music. Some issues of the magazine include music CDs, exhibitions and events.

== Bibliography ==
- Irene Amodei and Iolanda Pensa (eds), "Revue Noire. La testimonianza di N'Goné Fall", in Africa e Mediterraneo, no. 55, August 2006, pp. 13-16.
