= Kacimi =

Kacimi is a surname. Notable people with the surname include:

- Mohamed Kacimi (born 1955), Algerian novelist and playwright
- Mohamed Kacimi (painter) (1942–2003), Moroccan painter
- Rilès (Rilès Kacimi, born 1996), Franco-Algerian songwriter and performance artist
