= Abdallah Sadouk =

Moroccan painter and engraver (1950–2026)

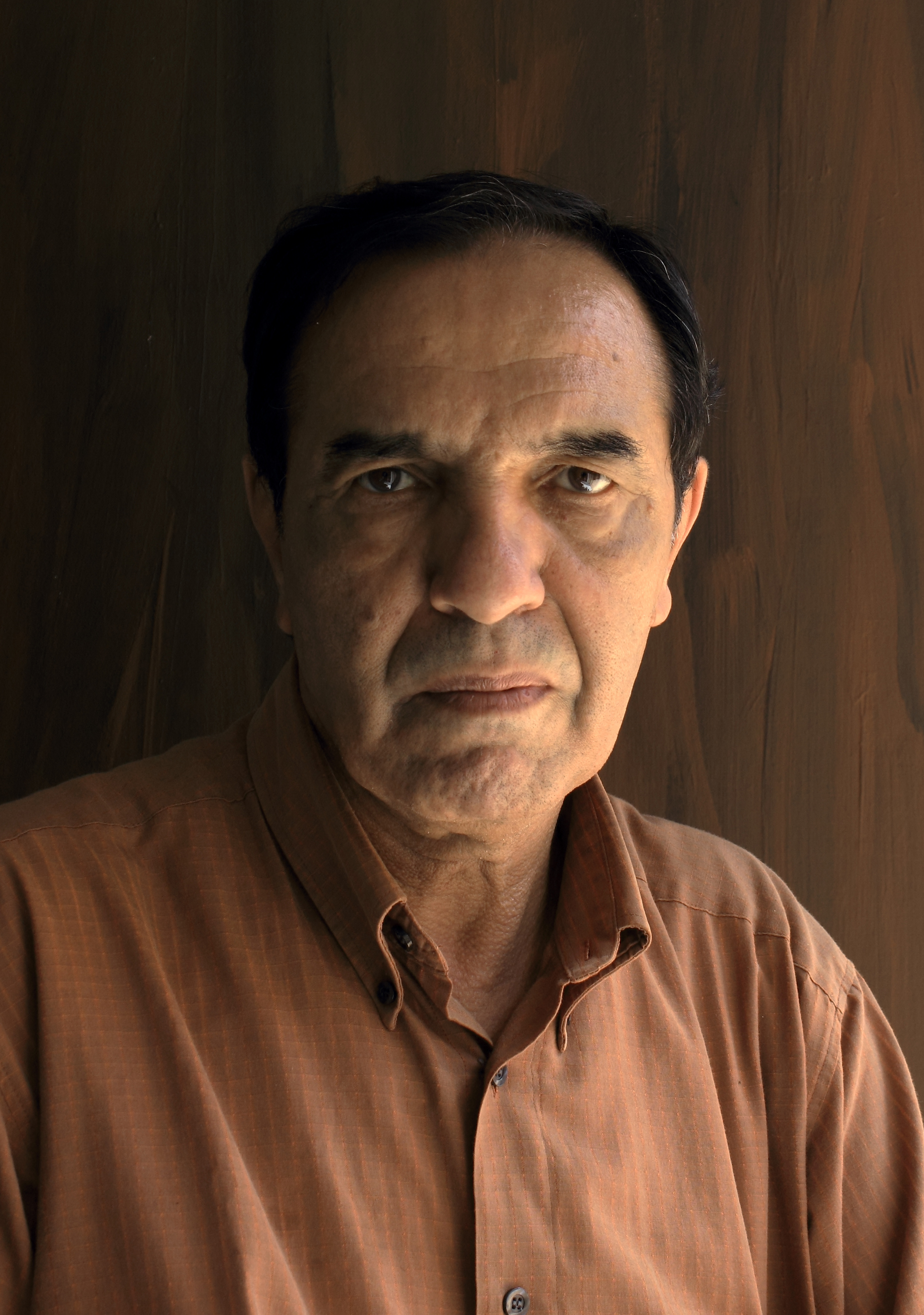
- Sadouk in 2014
- Born: 25 December 1950; Casablanca, Morocco
- Died: 15 February 2026 (aged 75); Paris, France
- Education: School of Arts of Tetouan; École nationale supérieure des arts décoratifs Beaux-Arts de Paris
- Occupations: Painter, engraver

Abdallah Sadouk (25 December 1950 – 15 February 2026) was a Moroccan painter and engraver.

== Life and career ==
Born in Casablanca on 25 December 1950, Sadouk studied at the School of Arts of Tetouan from 1967 to 1969 before continuing his education at the École nationale supérieure des arts décoratifs and the Beaux-Arts de Paris. He started his career in France before making his first public exhibitions in Morocco in 1995, 1999, and 2002. Although he lived in Paris throughout his career, he maintained a close connection to his Moroccan roots. His paintings followed a style of abstract landscapes, though he also ventured into sculpture later in his career. He maintained an element of Berber influence in his works.

Sadouk died in Paris on 15 February 2026, at the age of 75.

== Public collections ==
- Academy of the Kingdom of Morocco
- Mohammed VI Museum of Modern and Contemporary Art
- Fondation Attijariwafa Bank
- Ministry of Culture and Communication (Morocco)
- Bibliothèque francophone multimédia de Limoges
- Jordan National Gallery of Fine Arts
