= Revue Noire (magazine) =

Revue Noire Magazine Revue Noire: Art Contemporain Africain
- Editor: Jean Loup Pivin and Simon Njami
- Categories: Art
- Frequency: Quarterly
- First issue: 1991
- Final issue: 2001
- Company: Editions Revue Noire
- Country: France
- Based in: Paris
- Language: English French
- Website: revuenoire.com/
- ISSN: 1157-4127

Revue Noire was a quarterly printed magazine dedicated to African contemporary art, published from 1991 to 2001 by Editions Revue Noire.

== History and profile ==
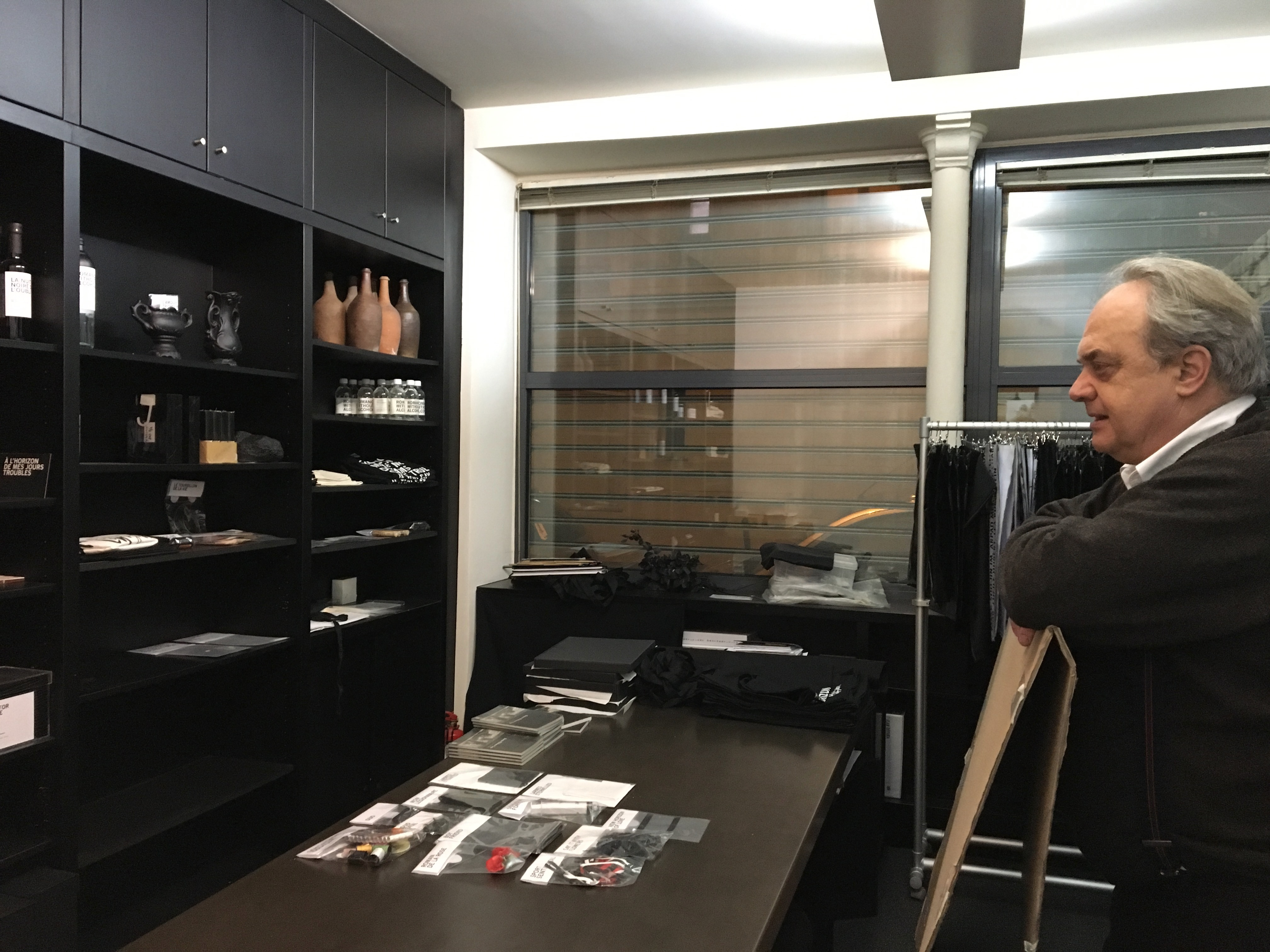
The Office of Revue Noire in Paris with Jean Loup Pivin

Revue Noire was founded in 1991 by Jean Loup Pivin, Pascal Martin Saint Lóon, Bruno Tilliette, and Simon Njami. Their goal was to give high-quality printed attention to contemporary African art. It covered varying subjects from sculpture, painting, photography, dance, theatre, music and literature. There were issues on African cities, AIDS, and even gastronomy. Design played a key role in forwarding its objectives and Revue Noire has been described as "glossy, fashion savvy and distinctly Parisian". Images were combined with largely informative texts that highlighted artistic responses to the international media and the touristic gaze as well as the production of discourses of cultural identity on the continent, the framing the African body, urban sites and rapidly changing dynamics between African aesthetic values and Western influences.

From the beginning Revue Noire was aimed at the widest possible audience of those with an interest in art, Africa, or intercultural subject matter. Distributed internationally, it was bilingual (English/French), sometimes adding texts in Portuguese. This language policy and its focus on specific regions - from Abidjan to London, Kinshasa to Paris, Accra, Teshie or Johannesburg to New York or Tokyo - not only facilitated access to information on African artistic production but also forged new links between artist based on the continent and those working in the diaspora.

After 34 issues, Editions Revue Noire interrupted the printing of the journal in 2001 and refocused its attention on publishing books, curating exhibitions and posting occasional online content.

== Issues ==
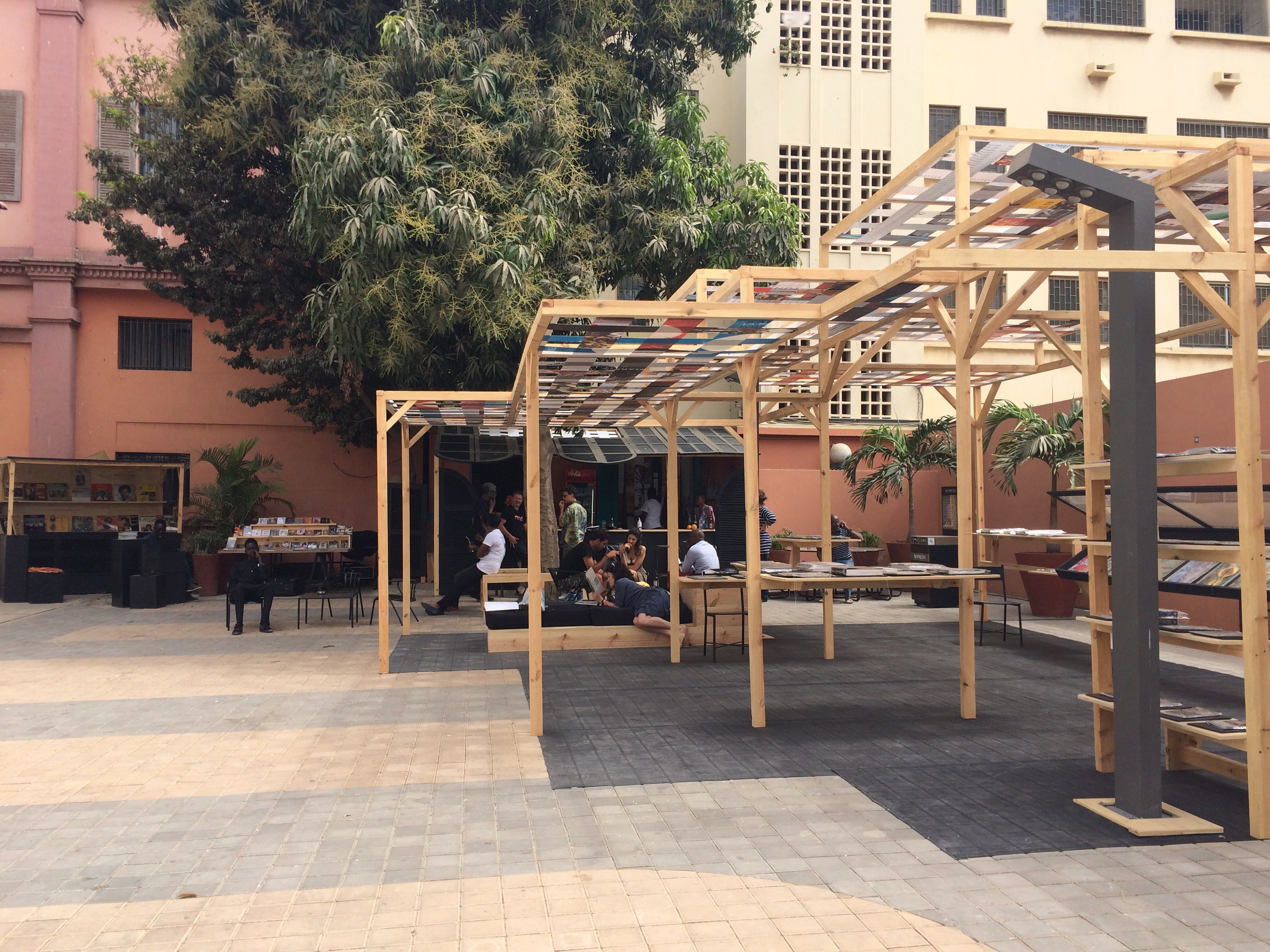
Exhibition about Revue Noire at Dak'Art 2016

The magazine focuses on artists' monographs and on specific countries or geographic areas where the editorial team produces research on arts (which include visual art, photography, music, literature, dance, theatre, fashion but also architecture and food). Some issues are focuses on a specific field.

- 1. Ousmane Sow and African London.
- 2. Sokari Douglas Camp, Dossier Abidjan, Côte d'Ivoire.
- 3. African Photography. Monography of Rotimi Fani-Kayode.
- 4. Michael Bethe Selassie, Dossier Namibia.
- 5. Ouattara, Dossier Libreville, Gabon.
- 6. La création dans les Caraibes: Cuba, Jamaica, Martinique, Guadeloupe, Guyane.
- 7. Dakar, Senegal with CD MBalax.
- 8. Cinema: Fespaco, Ouagadougou, Burkina Faso. Dossier Guinea-Bissau.
- 9. La création dans les Caraibes: Haiti, Dominican Republic, Puerto Rico, Trinidad, Guyana.
- 10. Cape Verde, theatre, dance and music.
- 11. South Africa; portfolios of Jackson Hlungwani, Andries Botha, Thomas Kgope, William Kentridge, Willie Bester.
- 12. Afrique Mediterranée / Afrique Noire (Farid Belkahia, Frédéric Bruly Bouabré, Kivuthi Mbuno, Gera, Tokoudagba, Abdoulaye Konaté, Gouider Triki, El Siwi, Rachid Koraïchi, Kacimi).
- 13. Cameroon; portfolios of Pascale Marthine Tayou, Bili Bidjocka, Dicko, Mbezele Solo Aloys; hommage of Chris Seydou. Dossier "Artistes africains et SIDA".
- 14. Africa Dance.
- 15. Mozambique and African photographers.
- 16. Ocean Indien: Île Maurice, La Réunion, Comores and Seychelles.
- 17. Mali, Burkina Faso, Niger and CD Kar Kar (Boubacar Traoré "Mali Twist").
- 18. Benin, portfolios of Georges Adeagbo, Romuald Hazoumé, C'est l'Avenir Zinsou, Kouas Gnonnou, Dakpogan.
- 19. Les artistes Africaines et le Sida with CD A Capella (Papa Wemba, Lulendo, Lokua Kanza, Ray Lema, Cheb Mami, Aminata Fall).
- 20. Paris Noir with CD Hip Hop Paris.
- 21. Kinshasa with CD RN à KIN.
- 22. Brazil, dossier dance.
- 23. African cuisine.
- 24. Ethiopia, Djibouti, Erythrea.
- 25. African Canada.
- 26. Madagascar.
- 27. African Fashion.
- 28. Zimbabwe.
- 29. Angola.
- 30. Nigeria.
- 31. African Urbis.
- 32. Togo, Ghana.
- 33/34. Morocco.
- 35. Joël Andrianomearisoa.
