= Yassine Balbzioui =

Moroccan artist

- Born: 1972 (age 53–54); Morocco
- Occupation: Artist

Yassine Balbzioui (born 1972, Morocco) is a contemporary artist known for his multidisciplinary approach, including painting, performance, and installation art. He describes himself primarily as a painter, yet his oeuvre spans various media, integrating elements of fiction and reality.

== Biography ==
Yassine Balbzioui studied at the School of Fine Arts of Casablanca. He later continued his education at the École des Beaux-Arts de Bordeaux in France and the University of California in the United States. His training across diverse cultural contexts profoundly influenced his artistic style and thematic explorations.

== Artistic oeuvre ==
Balbzioui's work is characterized by its thematic and stylistic versatility. While he identifies predominantly as a painter, his art often incorporates masks, human-animal hybrids, and an interplay between fiction and fact. His exhibitions include painting, photography, video installations, and performance art, creating a multilayered interpretative space.

Notable themes in his work include the use of masks as tools for transformation and the exploration of identity, both personal and collective. Through human-animal hybrids, Balbzioui blurs the lines between humanity and nature, encouraging viewers to question societal constructs and their relationship with the natural world.

== Iconographic Elements ==
Masks are central to Balbzioui’s art, functioning as instruments of transformation and concealment. Masks in his work serve a dual purpose: they obscure identity while simultaneously exposing the fragility of existence. His performance series 'Grosse Tête' (Big Head) exemplifies this theme, with Balbzioui constructing elaborate masks during live performances, symbolizing the complexity and instability of identity.

Human-animal hybrids are another recurring motif in Balbzioui's oeuvre. These hybrids, which merge the human form with animal characteristics, explore themes of identity and humanity’s primal instincts. His exhibition 'The Fish Inside Me' features swimmers wearing fish masks, presenting a surreal and enigmatic interpretation of human existence

== Selected exhibitions ==
- 2023: Into the Light, Kristin Hjellegjerde Gallery, London, United Kingdom.
- 2022: Karachi Biennial, Karachi, Pakistan.
- 2021: Kubatana, Vestfossen Kunstlaboratorium, Vestfossen, Norway.
- 2019: Ultrasanity, Chapter 2: Invocations, Savvy Contemporary, Berlin, Germany.
- 2018: 13th Dakar Biennale, Dak'Art, Dakar, Senegal.
- 2018: The Black Sphinx II, Primo Marella Gallery, Milan, Italy, and Primae Noctic, Lugano, Switzerland.
- 2017: E-moi, MACAAL (Al Maaden Museum of African Contemporary Art), Marrakech, Morocco.
- 2016: Public Pool 2, Cité Internationale des Arts, Paris, France.
- 2014: Le Maroc Contemporain, Institut du Monde Arabe, Paris, France.
- 2014: 100 Years of Creation, Mohammed VI Museum of Modern and Contemporary Art, Rabat, Morocco.
- 2012: Inexactly This, ZET Foundation, Amsterdam, Netherlands.
- 2012: 7th Berlin Biennale, Pornography of Everyday Life, Berlin, Germany.

== Collections ==
Balbzioui’s work is held in private and public collections, rincluding:

- Le Cube – Independent Art Room, Rabat, Morocco
- Mohammed VI Museum of Modern and Contemporary Art, Rabat, Morocco
- Institut du Monde Arabe, Paris, France
- Museum of African Contemporary Art Al Maaden (MACAAL), Marrakech, Morocco
- Iwalewahaus, University of Bayreuth, Bayreuth, Germany
