= Hocein Talal =

Moroccan painter (1942–2022)

- الحسين طلال
- Born: 1942; Chtouka, Morocco
- Died: February 19, 2022 (aged 79–80); Casablanca, Morocco
- Other name: Hossein Tallal
- Occupation: Painting
- Partner: Chaïbia Talal (mother)

Hocein Talal (Arabic: الحسين طلال; 1942– February 19, 2022), was a Moroccan painter. He was the son of Chaïbia Talal, one of the leading figures of contemporary Moroccan art. His name is also written as Hossein Tallal.

== Biography ==
Talal was born in 1942 in Chtouka (El Jadida Province), while his mother Chaïbia, married to a 70-year old man, was only 14. One year later, his father died, and his widowed mother raised him alone. She worked as a maid to earn money to support herself and her son.

Starting in 1967, Hocein was introduced to the visual art world, for which his mother had a big interest. He participated in numerous exhibitions around the world, including Galerie la Roue à Paris (1967), Salon de Mai of the Musée d'Art Moderne de Paris (1974), and many other exhibitions in Morocco, but also in Spain, Denmark, USA and Egypt.
