= Abdellatif Zine =

Moroccan painter

Abdellatif Zine (1940–2016) was a Moroccan painter. He was the founding president of both the National Association of Plastic Arts and the Union of Moroccan Plastic Artists.

Zine was born in Marrakesh and studied at L’Ecole des Beaux Arts in Casablanca, and subsequently at the Beaux-Arts de Paris in Paris. His paintings were exhibited internationally since 1960.

Zine produced paintings in bright colors, often related to Moroccan folklore. He also explored connections between painting and Gnawa music.

He died on 20 December 2016 and was buried on Casablanca's Achouhada Cemetery.
