= Ikram Kabbaj =

Moroccan sculpture artist

- إكرام القباج
- Born: 1960 (age 65–66); Casablanca, Morocco
- Education: École des Beaux-Arts
- Occupation: Sculptor
- Known for: Stone sculpture

Ikram Kabbaj (Arabic: إكرام القباج; born 1960) is a Moroccan sculptor. She works primarily in stone and marble.

== Early life and education ==
Kabbaj was born in Casablanca in 1960. She received her education from the École nationale supérieure des Beaux-Arts in Paris, studying there from 1978 to 1987 and specializing in sculpture. She lives and works between Casablanca and Marrakesh.

== Career and artwork ==
Kabbaj has exhibited her work in Morocco and internationally. Her work was featured in the Rabat Biennale at the Muhammad VI Museum of Modern and Contemporary Art in 2019.

With her 17-metre-tall piece entitled "La feuille de route," Kabbaj won the 2016 Autoroutes du Maroc Prize for Plastic Arts.
