= Amina Agueznay =

Moroccan visual artist

- Born: 1963 (age 62–63); Casablanca, Morocco
- Education: Catholic University of America, Washington, DC
- Known for: site-specific installations, jewellery design
- Notable work: Installation for Moroccan Pavillion at 2026 Venice Biennale
- Style: 21st-century visual artist
- Awards: Open My Med Prize 2010, Maison Mode Mediterrannée

Amina Agueznay (born 1963 in Casablanca, Morocco) is a Moroccan visual artist and trained architect, known for her contemporary artworks. Her work has included jewellery designs and art installations, incorporating elements of Moroccan cultural heritage as well as materials such as textile, paper, rose petals or burned plastic bags. In several exhibitions, including the 2026 Venice Biennale, she has created site-specific artistic installations.

Apart from her participation in art and fashion shows in Morocco and Europe, her work has been featured in art catalogues, magazines and in the British newspaper Financial Times. Among others, her creations have been documented by Moroccan photographer Leila Alaoui.

== Biography ==
Agueznay is the daughter of Moroccan painter and engraver Malika Agueznay, an alumna of the School of Fine Arts of Casablanca. Mother and daughter have created some artworks together, for example the site-specific exhibition Metamorphosis at the Attijariwafa Bank Foundation in Rabat 2018. Having graduated from secondary school in Casablanca, Agueznay studied in the US and obtained a Bachelor's Degree in Architecture from the Catholic University of America, Washington DC, in 1989. After fifteen years in the US and having worked there as an architect, she returned to Morocco in 1997 and has since been living and working in Marrakesh.

== Artistic career ==
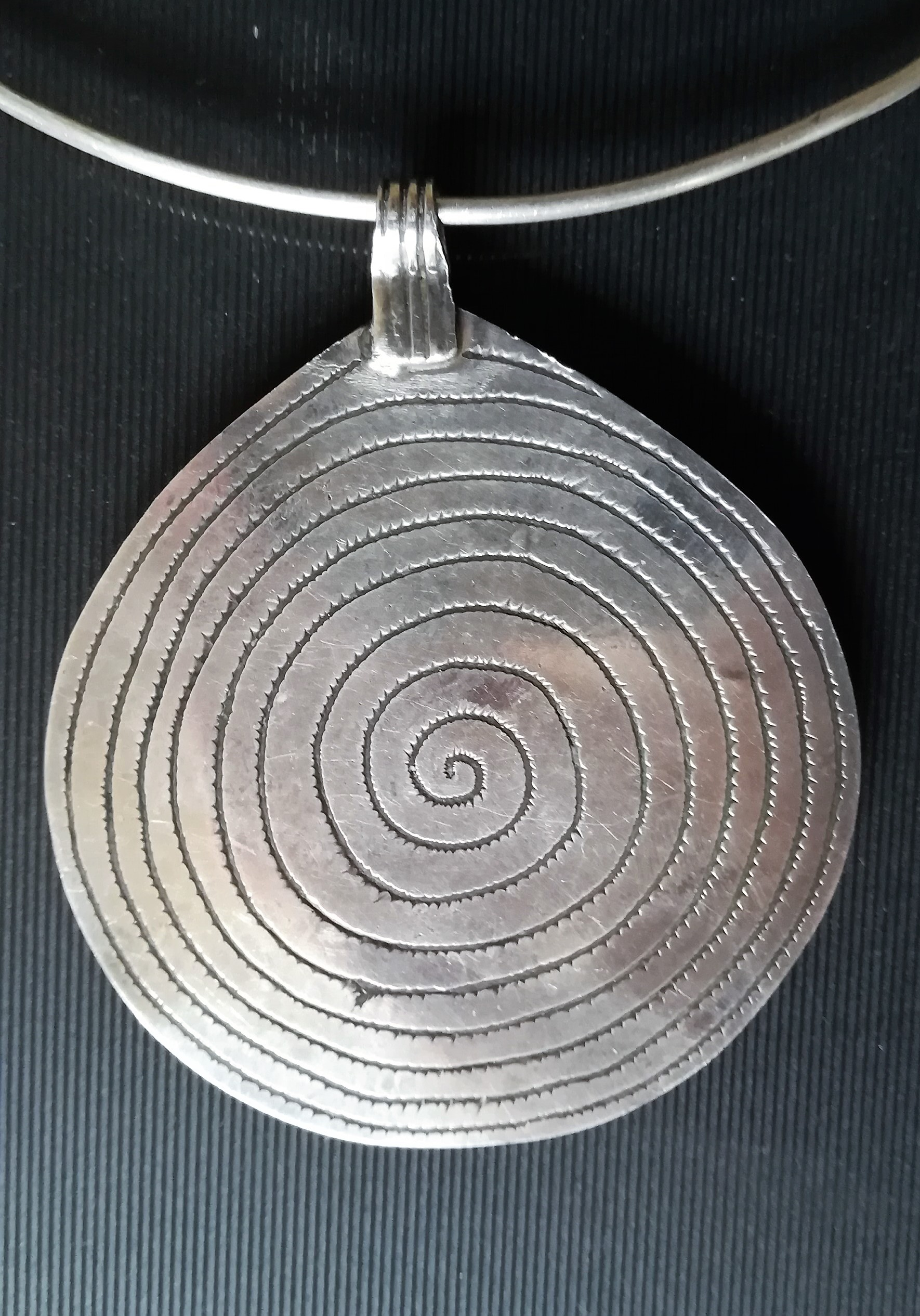
Agueznay's silver pendant with spiral pattern of traditional Moroccan Berber jewellery, traditional side of a double-use piece

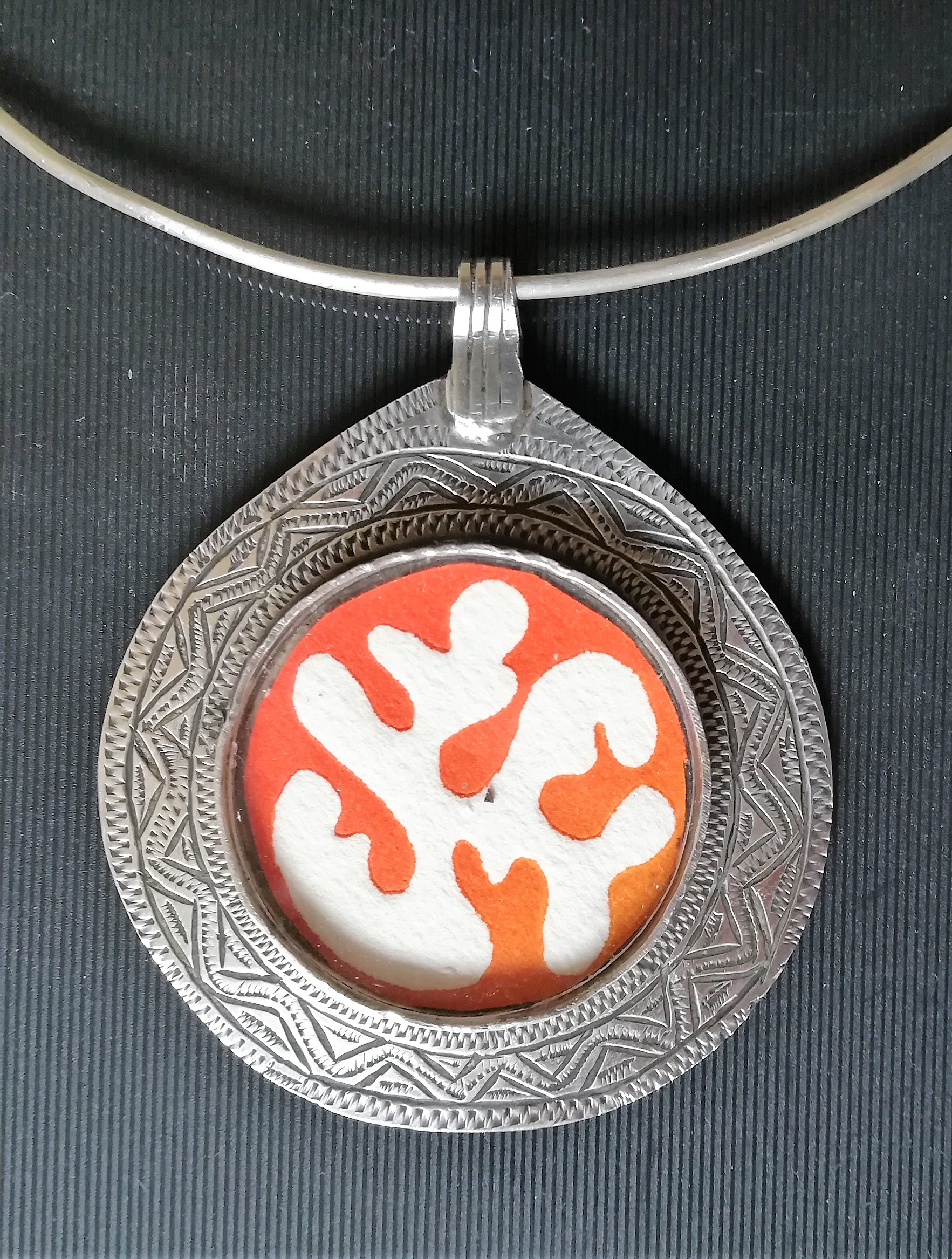
Silver pendant with traditional engraved ornaments in niello technique and contemporary application, modern side of a double-use piece

Following a first training in jewellery design in the US, she developed this type of artistic creation in contemporary style after her return to Casablanca, using traditional Moroccan jewellery and locally sourced materials. In workshops for handicrafts that she taught for government agencies, she also worked with craftspeople active as weavers, woodworkers, leatherworkers, basketry weavers and other crafts. This experience became another part of her artistic influences.

During the "Year of Morocco" cultural events in France in 1999, she presented her first collection of personal jewellery, made of historical silver pieces of the Berber tradition with her own additions. One example is a silver disk with a traditional spiral pattern on one side and Agueznay's contemporary addition on the other side. The next year, she created another collection, with variations of hand-made textile buttons (aqad), commonly used for traditional caftans.

In her first collection for the annual Kaftan fashion show in Morocco in 2003, she turned to materials such as rose petals, pieces of wood and cinnamon sticks and presented her jewellery together with fashion designer Noureddine Amir. For the 10th edition of the Kaftan event in 2006, she made another collection entirely out of paper, inspired by her earlier work as an architect. In 2010, she was one of the laureates of the Maison méditerranéenne des métiers de la mode (MMMM) (Mediterranean Institute for Fashion) in Marseille, and was awarded the Open My Med Prize. The same year, she created an hommage to the French-Tunisian fashion designer Azzedine Alaïa in the shape of a large collier necklace of red and black strings and metallic elements.

As an artistic statement on environmental pollution, her 2012 collection was made out of burned plastic bags. According to M. Angela Jansen, she has often been misunderstood in Moroccan society for her unconventional ideas, and even accused of not being Moroccan. To such criticism, she has replied: "I could say for example that the red stones remind me of Marrakesh and the white ones of Casablanca. But even if so, it is an unconscious process and should not be used to justify the Moroccanness on my work."

Her participation at the 2019 Biennale of Contemporary Art at the Mohammed VI Museum of Modern and Contemporary Art in Rabat was called Embody the Visible: Act the Invisible, in two acts. Tale of the unseen, of wool and silence and consisted of abstract structures of wool with embedded jewellery.

Based on her creations of weavings based on workshops using palm husks with Berber women from southern Morocco, Agueznay was awarded the 2024 Norval Sovereign African Art Prize.

For Morocco's first participation ever at the Venice Biennale in 2026, Agueznay created a 300 sq. m. installation titled Asetta (“loom” and “ritual of weaving”) in the Amazigh language. This work, created with textiles and traditional accessories by many women artisans, including weavers, beadworkers and embroiderers, was presented as "an exploration of the transmission of Morocco’s traditional craftsmanship and shared memory."

== Selected exhibitions ==
- Institut du Monde Arabe, Paris, France, 1999
- Galerie Les Atlassides, Morocco, 2005
- Art and Design, World Museum, Rotterdam, The Netherlands, 2005
- Solo show at FestiMode Fashion Week, Casablanca, 2007
- Fondation Société Générale art gallery, Casablanca, 2016
- Festival of Contemporary Art Art-O-Rama, Marseille, France, 2017
- Attijariwafa Bank Foundation, Rabat, Morocco, 2018
- Biennale of Contemporary Art, Rabat, 2019
- Vestfossen Kunstlaboratorium, Oslo, Norway, 2019
- Kristin Hjellegjerde Gallery, London, 2019
- Marrakesh Museum of Contemporary Art (MACAAL), Marrakesh, 2019-2020
- Musée National de l'Histoire de l'Immigration, Paris, 2021
- Venice Biennale 2026, Moroccan Pavillion
