= Myriam Mihindou =

Franco-Gabonese artist

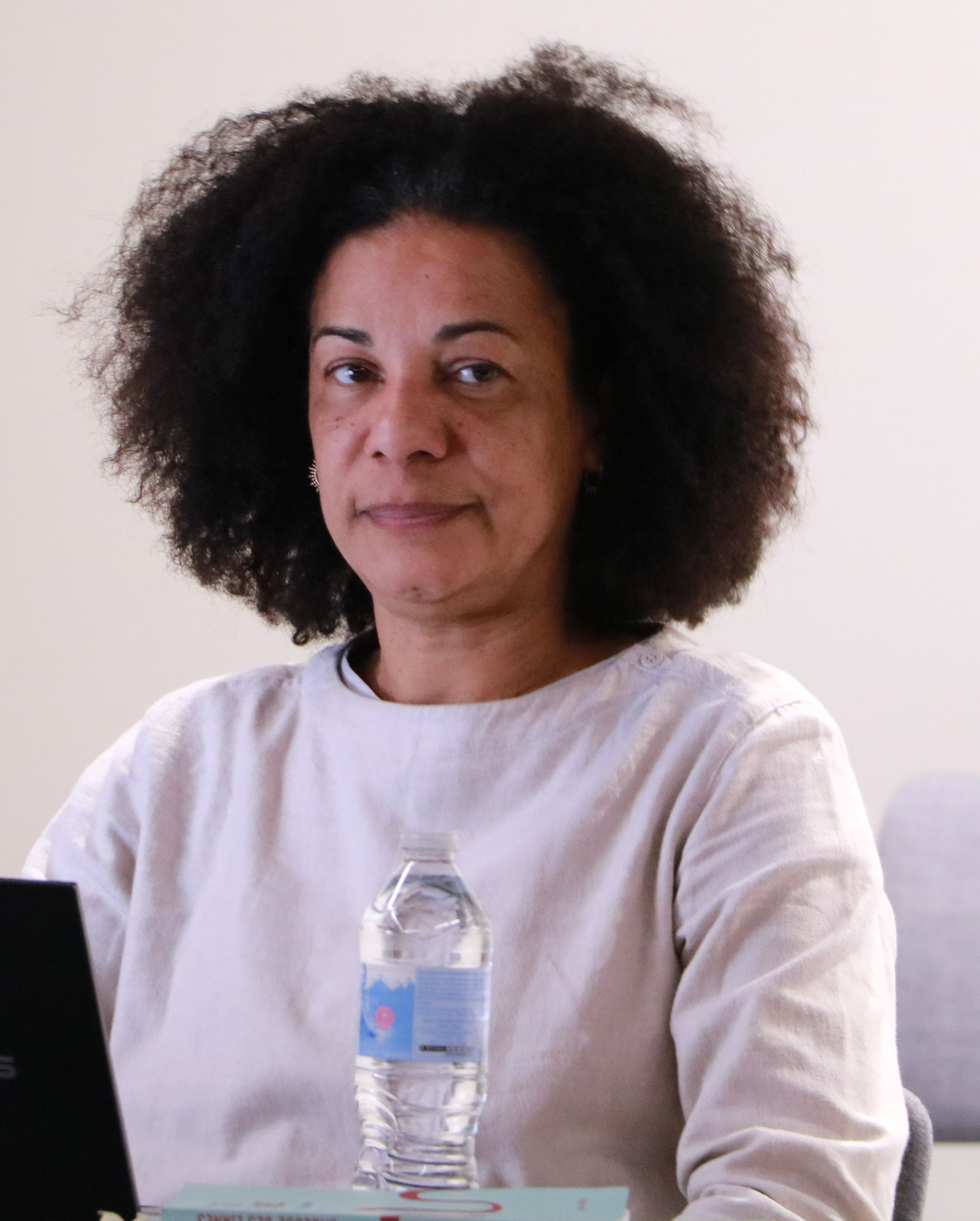
- Myriam Mihindou
- Born: 1964 (age 60–61); Libreville, Gabon
- Education: Bordeaux School of Fine Arts
- Occupation: contemporary artist

Myriam Mihindou (born in 1964 in Libreville, Gabon) is a Franco-Gabonese contemporary artist. She lives and works in Paris.

== Biography ==
Myriam Mihindou grew up in Gabon with a French mother and a Gabonese father, before going into exile in France in the late 1980s. After a degree in architecture, she joined the school of fine arts in Bordeaux. Suffering from aphasia, a disorder of spoken and written language, she was at the time looking for a means of expression. Working initially on sculpture and forging, Joseph Beuys and Ana Mendieta encouraged her to direct her plastic exploration in nature through ritualized actions with organic materials (earth, water, sun, paraffin, kaolin and tea). She graduated in 1993, developing a multidisciplinary plastic language, working as well in photography as in performance, video, drawing and sculpture. Her experience of travelling many countries including from Gabon to Reunion Island, from Egypt to Morocco, her works was nourished by these geographical and cultural encounters. Highly autobiographical, her creative processes probes memory, identity, the social, political and sexual body themes.
