= Najia Mehadji =

Franco-Moroccan artist

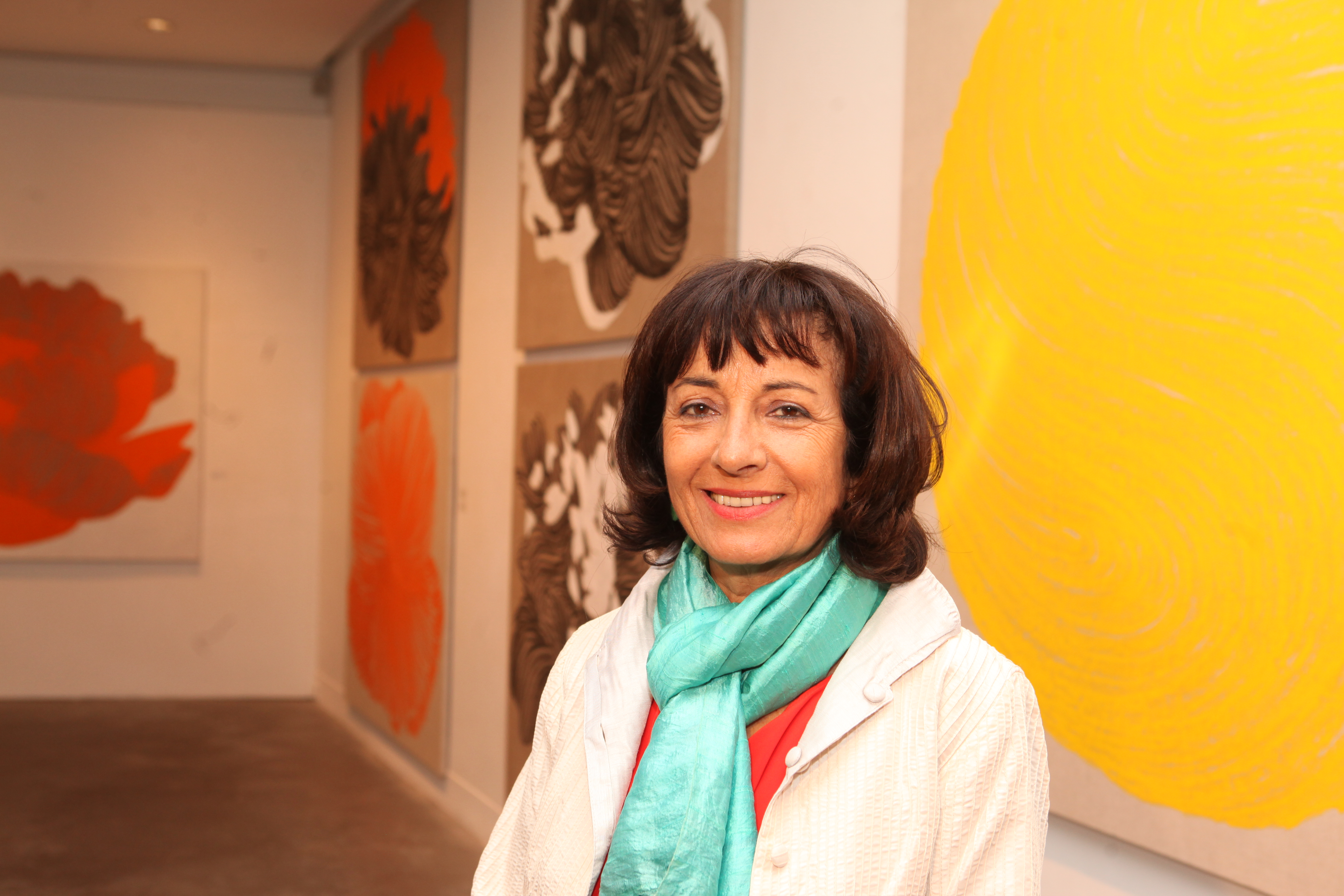
- Najia Mehadji at the exhibition "20 years of work" at Atelier 21
- Website: www.najiamehadji.com

Najia Mehadji (born in 1950) is an artist of Franco-Moroccan heritage who lives and works between Paris, France and Essaouira, Morocco.

== Biography ==
Najia Mehadji is a French-Moroccan artist familiar on the Moroccan scene and recognized in France since the 1980s through exhibitions in major museums, including the Centre Georges Pompidou in Paris. In the mid-1970s, she received a master of fine arts and art history degree from Pantheon-Sorbonne University and a theatrical degree from Paris 8 University. This led to her working with Peter Brook and The Living Theatre, avant-garde groups open to so-called "non-Europeans". The experience influenced her own work and contributed to the development of her particular style.

During those years, she discovered the Japanese Zen aesthetic and the rituals of Sufi Whirling Dervishes, using charcoal or ink freely in her work. She then created performances with students in contemporary music, drawing on large sheets of paper. She also joined the Women/Art group and published her first drawings, a kind of black-and-white diagram that can be described as "sensitive abstraction".

In 1985 she spent a year at Essaouira with a scholarship "Villa Médicis Hors les murs" and regularly returns each year for several months. It was during this first stay she painted her series on the myth of Icarus, "symbol of the risk-taking freedom" on large raw canvases where the imprint of body gestures is juxtaposed with collages and transparent geometric shapes. The works were exhibited in her first solo exhibition in the art museums of Caen and Poitiers in 1986–87.

In 1993–1994, in response to war crimes committed against the Bosniaks in ex-Yugoslavia, she created a series of Domes as a result of her interest in "transcultural" architectural shapes (including the octagon), while making explicit reference to the representation of cosmology in the arts of Islam. In 2005, she returned to this drama with the Flower War; digital works which appear in "The Disasters of War" by Goya.

From 1996 to 2006, Mehadji drew on large canvases with intense color chalks oil paintings / drawings from monochrome symbolic themes such as the sphere, the tree (or tree of life), the flower of Granada, etc. She created so many "abstract flow structures" capturing both transience of life, the passage, the notion of infinity. Then she began to paint with a broad brush curved lines in "arabesque" white or red on black, and inventing an "inner writing" sensitive and sublime body and soul: the Scrolls.

In 1998, she taught drawing as a visiting professor at the École nationale supérieure des Beaux-Arts (National School of Fine Arts) of Paris.

Alongside painting and drawing, since 2005, she has continued her commitment against violence in the Middle East, creating digital works incorporating enlarged details of Goya engravings (including La Tauromaquia and The Disasters of War ) within fluorescent flower designs – "as a tension between Eros and Thanatos".

Since 2008, she has created a new series of large-format paintings and digital images that give a sculptural aspect to her actions with Swirls, Arabesque, Mystic Dance, Coil whose continuous lines, free gestures and references to oriental calligraphy and Sufism are all formal proposals allowing her to adopt practices usually attributed to men by inventing a new approach to painting, liberated from tradition and resembling performance.

== Exhibitions ==
Her main personal exhibitions were held in France, including at the Museums of Fine Arts of Poitiers, Caen and Epinal, the Montenay Gallery in Paris, the St. John Hall (Mairie de Paris), and the Gallery The Ship in Brest. In Morocco, she exhibited at the National Gallery Bab Ruach in Rabat, the Actua space at Attijariwafabank in Casablanca, the Delacroix Gallery in Tanger, and the Shart Gallery and Atelier 21 in Casablanca. In Qatar, she exhibited with the Anima Gallery in Doha. She also exhibited in Amman at the Shoman Foundation, at the fair in Basel, at ARCOmadrid, and at the FI:AF (French Institute Alliance Française) in New York, as well as at other institutions worldwide.

She participated in 2009 in the exhibition at the Musée National d'Art Moderne (Paris) and Crossing during the Mawazine Festival (Rabat). In 2010, she participated in the Contemporary Art Fair in Dubai and the exhibition Resonances at the Marrakech museum. She also participated in the Marrakech Art Fair as part of the Shart Gallery of Casablanca.

In 2011, in the group exhibition 'Architectures / Drawings / Utopias' 'at the National Museum of Romanian Contemporary Art in' 'Nature and Landscapes' at the art space of the General Company of Casablanca, and Drawing Now Paris at the Carrousel du Louvre. Then she exposes in 'Sense & Essences' at the New York French Institute (FI: AF) and Villa Roosevelt to Casablanca his series Mystic Dance . It is one of these artists Traits d'Union – Paris and contemporary Arab art at Villa Emerige in Paris: museum exhibition that brings together a dozen Arab artists have a special relationship with France, and whose success is such that it, through the French Institute, is traveling in 2012–2013 (Beirut, Sana'a, Rabat, etc.)

In 2012–2013, she exhibited at the Galerie Shart, Casablanca, Close at the Galerie Albert Benamou in Paris and Art Paris Art Fair, then Anima Gallery in Doha (Qatar). She participates in 25 years of Arab creativity at the Institut du Monde Arabe, Emirates Palace in Abu Dhabi and Manama in Bahrain. His solo exhibitions in 2013 are: Mystic Dance at Espace Art Roch (Paris), The 2000 at the Espace Claude Lemand (Paris), draping at the gallery The Ship (Brest). She participates in the auction Syriart in Paris and Beirut to support the civilian victims of the Syrian people in revolt.

Early 2014 she made a solo exhibition "New Arabesque" at the Galerie Le Violon Bleu in Tunis and at Art Dubai (Selma Feriani Gallery London) and at Art Paris Art Fair (gallery Lemand Claude Paris). In summer 2014, his series of digital works Suites Goyesques; Bullfighting are shown in the Musée d'Art Moderne de Céret in The painter and the arena and bullfighting art from Goya to Barceló Then she participated in the inaugural exhibition of the Musée Mohammed VI d'art moderne et contemporain Rabat "Art 1914–2014,100ans in Morocco," as well as that of the Arab World Institute in Paris " the Contemporary Morocco ". In March 2015 she exhibited "20 years of work" at the gallery Atelier 21 in Casablanca that organizes her first retrospective in Morocco and at Art Paris Art Fair at the Grand Palace in the gallery Claude Lemand.

The works of Najia Mehadji are present in many public collections and museums, including the Centre Georges Pompidou MNAM (4 large drawings and a painting on paper) and the Arab World Institute in Paris (paint) and in collections Société Générale, the ONA Foundation, the Mohammed VI Museum of Modern and Contemporary Art of Rabat and Casablanca Attijari Waffabank who own many works. Several videos about the artist can be seen on YouTube.

== Bibliography ==
- Najia Mehadji Edition Somogy, 2008. Texts Alain Tapie, Christine Buci-Glucksmann, Jean-Louis Baudry, Mohamed Rachdi and Henri-François Debailleux. 160 pages, French / English texts, 130 color illustrations.
- Review star ink n°42, 2010, "Celebration", interview with Peggy Ines Sultan
- Monograph Najia Mehadji Les Éditions Art Point, collection Moroccan Art Books, 2012: texts of Pascal Amel, Rémi Labrusse Veronique Rieffel, Christine Buci-Glucksmann, Ghitha Triki, Philippe Piguet, Anne Dagbert, Peggy Ines Sultan Mohamed Rachdi, Henri-François Debailleux. 280 pages, 10 French / English texts, 330 color illustrations.
- The revelation of gesture, Edition Somogy, 2011 Pascal Amel texts, Veronique Rieffel, Abdelwahab Meddeb, Rémi Labrosse etChristine Buci-Glucksmann. 160 pages, French / English texts.
