= Zakaria Ramhani =

Moroccan visual artist (born 1983)

- Born: 1983 (age 42–43)
- Citizenship: Moroccan
- Occupation: Visual Artist

Zakaria Ramhani (born 1983 in Tangiers) is a Moroccan visual artist who lives and works in Montreal. He is known for his large-scale paintings that use Arabic calligraphy as a formal gesture.

Ramhani grew up in a Muslim society and in an artistic household; his father was a landscape painter who avoided portraying the human figure for religious reasons. He occasionally had to paint commissioned portraits and explained to his son that he would ask God's forgiveness. The paradox at the core of Ramhani's work is the tradition of aniconism in Islam. His fascination with portraiture is at odds with the practice of Islamic calligraphy, which has long been a venerated art form for representing the divine.

In 2006, Ramhani became the youngest Moroccan citizen to be awarded a residency from the French government at the Cité internationale des arts in Paris. Since then, he has exhibited in Europe and the Middle East, including at the Barbican Centre in London, Centre d'Exposition Val-d'Or in Quebec, Institut du Monde Arabe in Paris, the Dakar Biennale, the Bahrain National Museum, the Cairo Biennale, and the British Museum at DIFC Dubai. He had one of the top ten highest auction results for artists under 30 in 2010. His work is in the collections of the Barjeel Foundation, the Alain-Dominique Perrin Collection, and the Royal family of Morocco. He is represented by Julie Meneret Contemporary Art who exhibited his work for the first time in the United States in the fall of 2013, with a show entitled May Allah Forgive Me, Vol. 1 and 2.

== Bibliography ==
- Pinto Ferretti, Alexia. Regards croisés sur les mondes de l’autoportrait : le cas des artistes d’origine marocaine Hicham Benohoud, Mehdi-Georges Lahlou et Zakaria Ramhani, Revue Muséologies, 9, 2018, 61. (ISNN, 1718-5181)
- Cherkaoui, M'hammed. Art et football. Sur deux représentations de Diego Maradona dans l’art contemporain au Maroc, Revue Reflexions sportives, 2023. (ISNN, 2737-8799)
