= Amina Benbouchta =

Moroccan contemporary artist

- Born: 1963 (age 62–63); Casablanca, Morocco
- Occupation: Artist

Amina Benbouchta (born 1963), is a Moroccan painter, photographer, and installation artist. She was educated in Canada and Paris, is recognized internationally for her contemporary artworks that concentrate on social issues regarding gender politics. Early in her career she headed the fashion and culture magazine Les Aligés. She was also part of the Collectif 212 group of artists and curators who dedicated themselves to supporting emerging contemporary art in Morocco.

== Education and work ==
Born in Casablanca, Morocco in 1963, Amina Benbouchta was raised during the Years of Lead, under the reign of King Hassan II of Morocco, which was noted for its state violence and political intolerance. It was during this period that Benbouchta's career as an artist officially began in 1986 after her graduation from McGill University in Montreal, Canada, where she majored in Anthropology and Middle Eastern Studies. In 1988 and for the next two years, she audited art classes at the Ecole Nationale des Beaux Arts in Paris. Her works have been shown in institutions around the world, from the Cairo Biennial (1993) to the National Museum of Women and the Arts in Washington DC, USA (1997), with her most recent group and solo shows taking place in Rabat, Morocco. She primarily presents either in Morocco, Spain, or France. She began attending art fairs in 2008 in Marrakech, Morocco.

During the 1990s Benbouchta headed the fashion and culture magazine Les Alignés. She was also the co-founder of Collectif 212, a group of curators and artists concerned with supporting emerging contemporary art in Morocco. The members consisted of Hassan Echair, Safâa Erruas, Jamila Lamrani, Imad Mansour, Myriam Mihindou, and Younés Rahmoun.

In 1997 she completed her first residency at the Hôpital des Enfant Maladies, in Rabat, Morocco. In 2004, she completed her second residency at Musée de Marrakech/Maroc-France, expériences croisées in Marrakech, Morocco. In 2008, she completed her third residency at Castel de Denia in Denia, Spain.

Through her paintings, installations, and photography she draws on her anthropological studies background to reflect on everyday objects, the human, and her cultural environment. Her focus is in incorporating social issues regarding gender politics into her art.
