= Amina Id Abdellah =

Moroccan visual artist

- Born: 25 January 1971 (age 55); Marrakesh, Morocco
- Known for: Painting
- Website: idabdellah.com

Amina Id Abdellah (born 25 January 1971) is a contemporary Moroccan visual artist. She is known for her photo-realistic paintings and drawings of natural environments and phenomena.

== Early life ==
Id Abdellah was born on 25 January 1971 in Marrakesh, Morocco. She moved to Rabat at the age of 10, and began her painting career as a child.

== Collections ==
Amina's works are held in the collections of several public museums, including:

- the Second Forum of Music and Art in the city of Temara.
- Irfan Art Exhibition, Rabat
- Mohammed V University at Souissi.
- Women's Show of Arts, Rabat.
- Russian Cultural Center in Rabat.
