= Mohammed ben Ali R'bati =

Moroccan painter (1861–1939)

- محمد بن علي الرباطي
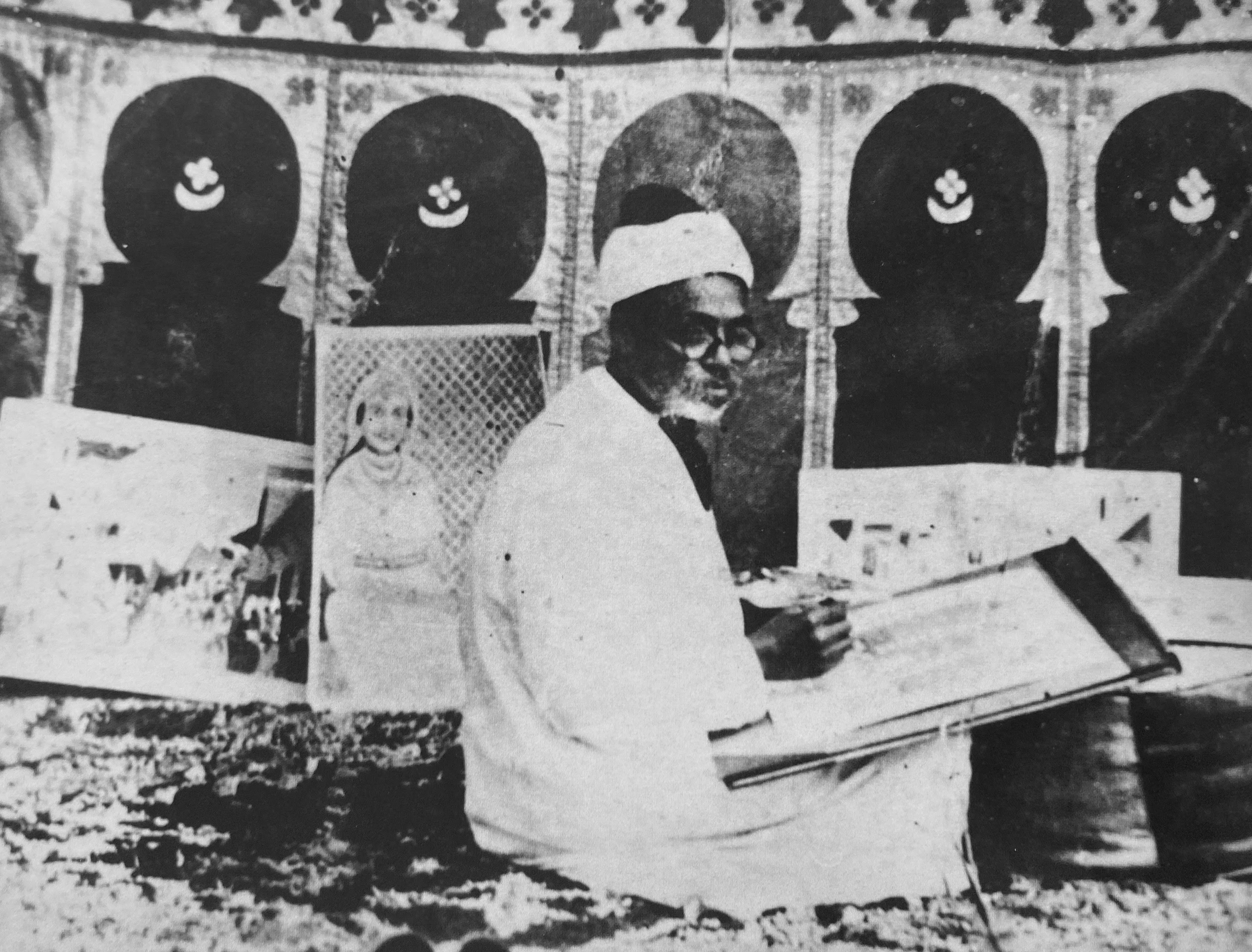
- R'bati in his workshop, c. 1933
- Born: 1861; Rabat, Morocco
- Died: 1939 (aged 77–78); Tangier, Morocco
- Years active: c. 1890–1939
- Style: Aquarelle
- Movement: Modernism
- Children: 7
- Military career
- Allegiance: Spain
- Branch: 1st Group of Indigenous Regular Forces "Tetuán"
- Service years: 1925–1927
- Rank: Tabor (firefighting)

Mohammed ben Ali R'bati (Arabic: محمد بن علي الرباطي; 1861–1939), also known as Ben Ali Rabbati, was a Moroccan painter and cook who was described as "the father of Moroccan painting". He was known for his blend of traditional influences with European-style art with his paintings mainly revolved around life in the city of Tangier, where he was lived.

Born in Rabat where he received an Islamic education, R'bati and his family moved to Tangier at 25 where he pursued a career as an artisan carpenter and as a chef. During his youth, R'bati had practiced illustration as a hobby, but was never formally trained in arts.

R'bati's career began in 1903 after meeting Irish painter Sir John Lavery who noticed him selling handmade postcards, Lavery recruited him as a cook and encouraged him to start making watercolor paintings which he sold to Tangier's upper class. R'bati held exhibitions across the globe, notably in London, Marseille and Marrakesh.

In 1933, R'bati was offered a workshop in the center of Tangier and opened a restaurant the same year. He largely lived a life of poverty, and died in 1939 of a heart attack.

== Early life and education ==
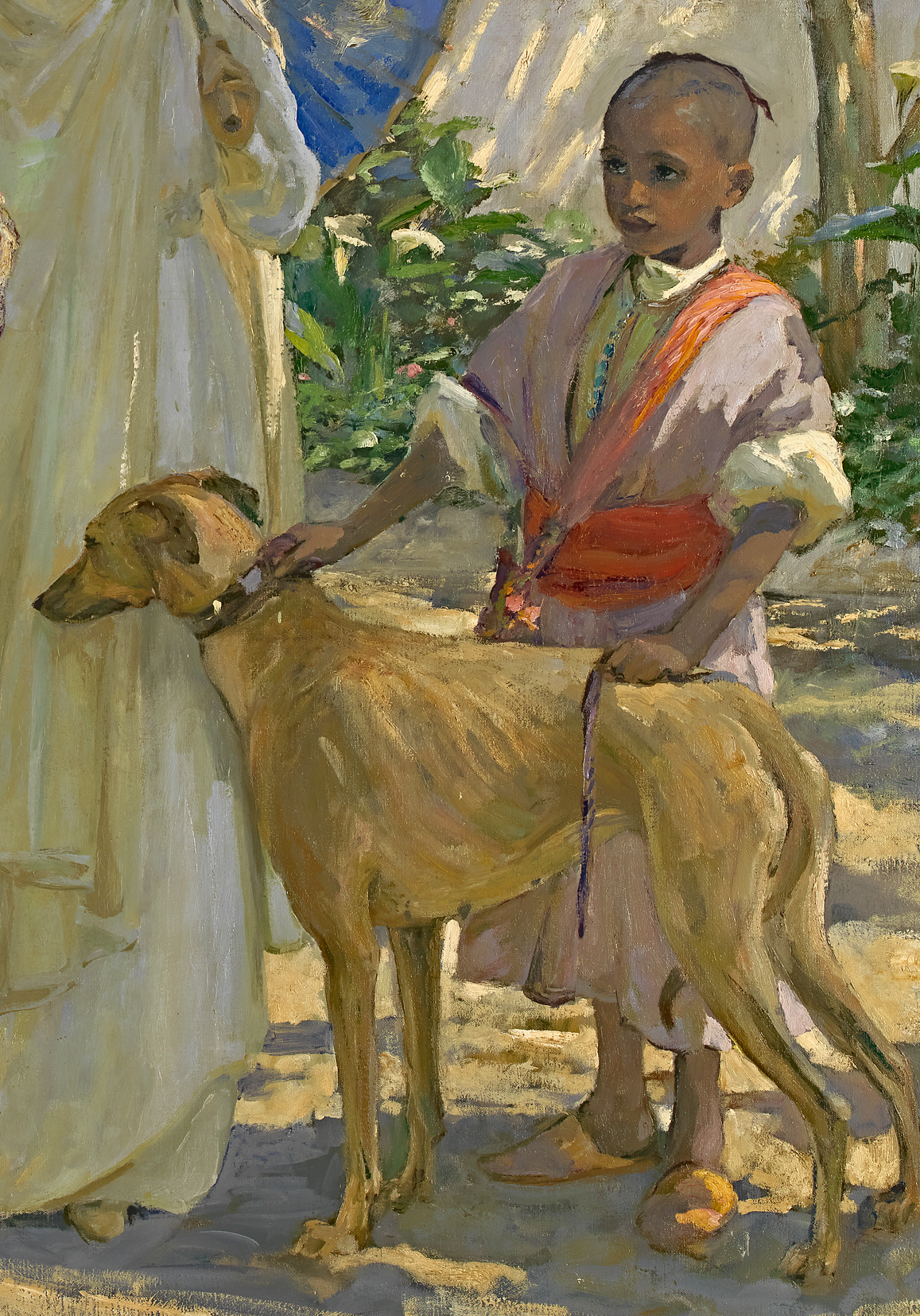
R'bati depicted as a child with a dog, detail from In Morocco by John Lavery, c. 1913. National Gallery of Victoria

Mohamed ben Ali R'bati was born in Rabat in 1861, with his birthplace reflected in his surname. Born in a modest family, he attended a madrasa in his youth where he memorized the Quran. Many of his paintings depict his education at the madrasa. R'bati's daughter described his youth as sociable, disliking school and saving money to buy watercolors, colored pencils and pens to draw.

R'bati later spent numerous years training and working as an artisan carpenter and as a cook. R'bati and his family moved to Tangier in 1886, at age 25. R'bati often painted on canvases, wood and tbilats, rarely selling his works in favor of handing them out for free. Despite this, R'bati never had any formal training in arts.

== Career and exhibitions ==
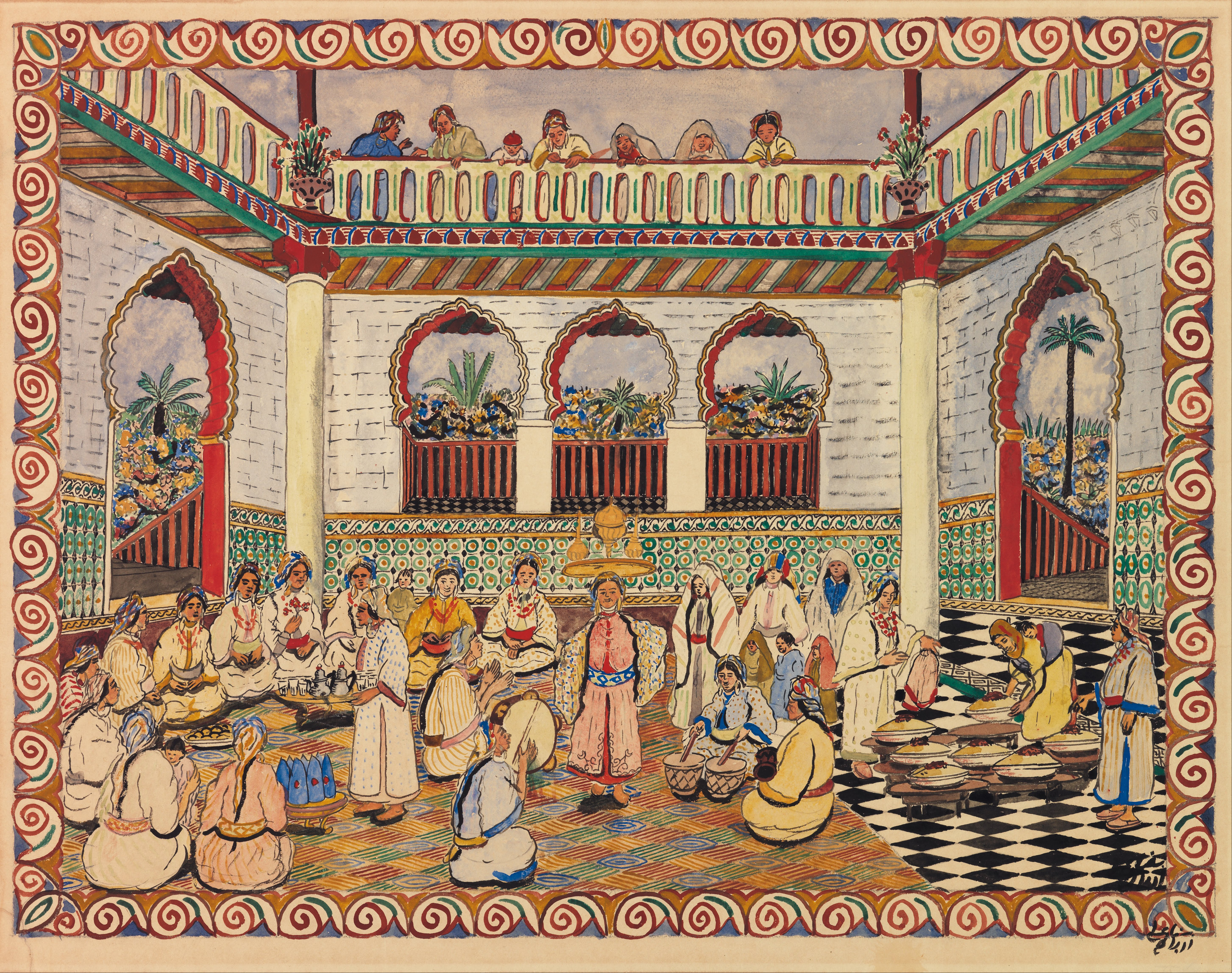
Festival Scene by R'bati, c. 1935. Mathaf

In 1903, R'bati met Irish painter Sir John Lavery while selling handmade postcards at the Petit Socco square in Tangier, Lavery had first settled in Morocco in 1890. R'bati was known among foreigners in Tangier for his cooking skills and was recruited as a cook by Lavery, who had noticed R'bati's watercolor skills and chosen him as a protégé. Lavery invited R'bati to the British Legation in Tangier and introduced him to Sir Harry Maclean. In Lavery's writings and articles, R'bati is referred to as "Ben Ali Rabbati" or "Ben Ali".

In 1916, R'bati visited London with Lavery, where his first exhibition was held at the Goupil Gallery in London. The same year, he moved to Marseille as an immigrant worker at a sugar plant belonging to Saint-Louis Sucre before returning to Tangiers in 1922. R'bati organized a second exhibition in Marseille in 1919. He organized his third exhibition in the Mamounia hotel in Marrakesh in 1922.

In 1925, he enrolled in the Spanish Army as a Tabor firefighter within the Indigenous Regular Forces in obscure circumstances. According to his daughter, R'bati felt "displeased" and was later discharged two years later.

R'bati later worked as a messenger and as a guard for the Tangier branch of the Banco de Bilbao, where he painted during his night shifts, selling his artwork and postcards at a souvenir shop. In December 1929, R'bati's paintings were shown at the Musée des Oudayas in Rabat.

In 1933, he moved to Riad Sultan neighborhood of Tangier where he was offered a permanent gallery by the governing makhzen near the caid of Tangier's palace. The only known photograph of R'bati was taken in his Riad Sultan gallery. His paintings were purchased by Sultan Moulay Abdelaziz, Manuel II of Portugal, Charles de Beaupoil, and Barbara Hutton. The same year, he opened a restaurant and a bakery in Tangier.

R'bati preferred watercolor on paper as a medium over oil on canvas. He frequently painted Tangier, its qasba, and its inhabitants. He painted simplified human figures, and often painted a large, colorful scene with several people. He always signed his paintings in Arabic. He is considered one of the first Moroccans to indulge in European-style painting. He is described as a modernist. He is described by Vogue as the "father of Moroccan painting".

== Death and personal life ==
R'bati died in 1939 in Tangier of a heart attack in unclear circumstances, with his daughter suspecting him to be a victim of poisoning. R'bati had seven children, he remarried upon returning from London after his first wife died in 1920. Two of his sons, Abdelkader and Abdelmalek ben Mohammed R'bati (1900–1978), continued painting, often using their defunct father's signature on their works.

He lived a life of poverty due to his habit of spending most of his earnings on painting material and his difficulty selling his paintings in Tangier, which often led him to give away most of his artwork. R'bati's daughter recalls him as an affable man who often attended social gatherings in Tangier, including ones reserved for women.
