= Aassmaa Akhannouch =

Moroccan photographer

- Born: 1973 (age 52–53); Meknès, Morocco
- Citizenship: Moroccan
- Occupations: Photographer, artist
- Years active: 2010s–present
- Notable work: Prix HSBC pour la photographie (2021)

Aassmaa Akhannouch (born 1973) is a Moroccan artist and photographer. She is the winner in 2021 of the 26th Prix HSBC pour la photographie.

== Biography ==
Born in 1973 in Meknes, Morocco, Aassmaa Akhannouch earned an engineering degree in France and an MBA in the United States, then worked in marketing for fifteen years. In 2013, to improve her knowledge of digital photography, she took a course at the Photo Academy Casablanca, Morocco, and decided to devote herself entirely to a career in photography in 2016.

She works in the cyanotype process, an early monochrome photographic printing technique, to which she applies a variety of idiosyncratic processes such as tea baths and watercolor highlights. She explains her approach to photography: "My photography is an exploration of memory. Through my images and careful attention to the printing process, I tell stories, fragments of memories open to the viewer's associations and emotions. Rather than an intention to document the past, I attempt to reveal the emotions that dwell in me. What I try to extract from the past is an impression, intimate, lyrical and timeless." Between 2016 and 2018, she collaborated in her research with the artist photographer FLORE in the photographic studio of L'Œil de l'Esprit in Paris.

In 2021, Akhannouch won the Prix HSBC pour la photographie for her series “The house that still lives within me...”. The HSBC prize winners are given funds to support the publication of a book of their photographs. Akhannouch produced La maison qui m'habite encore, which was published by Atelier Xavier Barral in 2021 in French and English.

Akhannouch lives and works in Casablanca and the Lot Valley in Occitania, France.

== Publications ==
- La maison qui m'habite encore. Paris: Xavier Barral, 2021. ISBN 9782365112918. With a foreword by Sylvie Hugues, translated by Anna Knight.

== Awards ==
- 2017: Special mention of the jury, Maghreb Photography Award, for her series, "Ocean Boulevard".
- 2021: 26th Prix HSBC pour la photographie for her series, "The house that still lives within me...".
