= Mohamed Kacimi (painter) =

Moroccan painter (1942–2003)

- Born: December 28, 1942; Meknes, Morocco
- Died: October 27, 2003 (aged 60); Rabat, Morocco
- Occupation: Painter

Mohamed Kacimi (1942–2003) was a Moroccan painter. He was the recipient of the Grand Prix du Mérite from the King of Morocco in 2000.

== Early life ==
Mohamed Kacimi was born on December 28, 1942, in Meknes, Morocco.

== Career ==
Kacimi was a painter. He was a member of the Association Marocaine des Arts Plastiques (AMAP). He was invited to paint murals in Asilah in 1978. His work was published in Le Monde Diplomatique on a regular basis. Meanwhile, Revue Noire published a special issue about his work in 1996. Kacimi was awarded the Grand Prix du Mérite from the King of Morocco in 2000.

Kacimi was also a human rights activist. He exhibited his work for the Organisation Marocaine des Droits Humains (OMDH) in 2002. In September 2003, he wrote an open letter to Sidiki Kaba, the president of the International Federation for Human Rights, calling for the release of journalist Tayseer Allouni.

== Death and legacy ==
Kacimi died in a Hepatitis C-induced coma on October 27, 2003, in Rabat. Shortly after his death, the Moroccan Ministry of Culture called him an "ambassador of Moroccan painting throughout his life." In 2005, the ministry dedicated the Galerie Mohamed Kacini in Fez. By 2007, some of his work was auctioned by Christie's, with one painting being sold for US$67,000.
