= Hassan Hajjaj =

Moroccan artist (b. 1961)

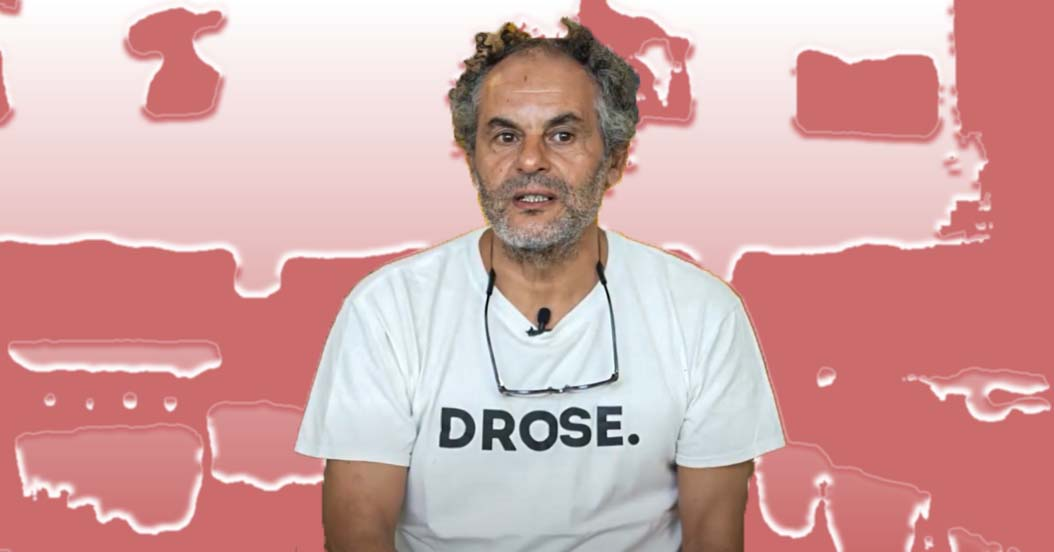
- Born: 1961 (age 64–65); Larache, Morocco
- Occupations: Contemporary artist, photographer
- Known for: Portrait photographs
- Spouse: Vanessa L. Brown (m. 1987)
- Children: 2

Hassan Hajjaj (born 1961), is a Moroccan contemporary artist and photographer. He lives and works between London, United Kingdom, and Marrakesh, Morocco. He is known for his portrait photographs.

== Early life ==
Hajjaj was born in Larache, Morocco in 1961.

== Career ==
Hajjaj's first feature-length film, Karima: A Day in the Life of a Henna Girl, premiered at the Los Angeles County Museum of Art in May 2015. The film takes viewers into the world of one Hajjaj's most iconic series, Kesh Angels, depicting the henna girls of Marrakesh.

Hassan Hajjaj: My Rock Stars was exhibited at the Memphis Brooks Museum of Art in 2016. The film was shown at Art Basel in Basel, Switzerland in June 2015, curated by Cairo-based film curator and lecturer Maxa Zoller.

The exhibition Hassan Hajjaj: La Caravane opened in London's Somerset House on 5 October 2017, his first solo show in the city in seven years.

Hajjaj paid tribute to fellow Moroccan celebrities in "My Maroc Stars". The work featured artists, singers and designers such as Hindi Zahra, Dizzy DROS, Yassine Morabite, and many others.

One of Hajjaj’s most famous works include Kesh Angels (2010), a photograph of five veiled women from Marrakesh, Morocco, as they sit on motorbikes stationed in front of the Theatre Royal. In Hajjaj's photograph, the women are adorned with colorful, heart-shaped sunglasses and striped socks, as the edited graphic pattern of repeating upside-down red food cans lines the border.

Hajjaj was commissioned by Vogue to shoot a series of photographs of pop singer Billie Eilish for the cover of their March 2020 magazine. In Hajjaj’s cover, the singer sports a Gucci jacket and necklace, as she poses against a colorful patterned backdrop, for which the self-taught photographer is known. The magazine issue also included other photos shot by Hajjaj, including one where Eilish wore a blazer made from the flag of Casablanca football club, Wydad AC. Eilish was dressed in Hajjaj's clothing label Andy Wahloo, and is shown posing in front of a decorative straw rug that is commonly found in North Africa.

== Art practice ==
Aside from mixing elements of both Moroccan and pop culture references together in his art, Hajjaj is also known for subverting the Western viewer’s expectations as he deconstructs the “tourist gaze that fetishizes veiled women” and instead situates them in a purposefully jumbled, animated light. By refashioning the Westernized view of Orientalism, Hajjaj states that he wanted to illustrate the multidimensional facets of Moroccan society in his photograph.

Similarly, Femmes du Maroc, a popular magazine for women in Morocco, held the first fashion event to showcase Moroccan wear in 1996. Journalist Aïcha Zaïmi Sakhri has commented on the now-popularized event, Caftan, by stating that its purpose was to show women that the caftan is not just a part of cultural wear, but a garment that could be worn in a fun, fashionable and modern sense. Much like the magazine’s attempts to modernize Moroccan women fashion, Hajjaj's colorful photograph of the veiled, playful women atop their motorbikes contrasts the audience’s perceptions of Moroccan women to show the "tension between assumption… and reality".

Hajjaj's style is easily recognizable and combines “elements of high fashion with trashy pop culture”. He is known to mix luxury brands with obvious fakes and usually frames his photography with repeated motifs consisting of tin cans. Hajjaj's stylings combine camouflage, polka-dot, or animal prints with traditional fabrics from the souk. His photos "bring a sense of play that melds Moroccan heritage with a patchwork hip-hop swagger".

== Recognition and awards ==
Hajjaj was the winner of the 2011 Sovereign Middle East and African Art Prize and was shortlisted for Victoria & Albert Museum's Jameel Prize in 2009. In 2013, Rose Issa Projects published the monograph By Hassan Hajjaj, Photography, fashion, film, design edited by Katia Hadidian, London (2014) exploring his upbringing in Morocco and London, his experiences in fashion and interior design, and his adventures in the music industry influence the vibrant colours, joyful spirit, and visual rhythm of his highly sought-after images.

In 2019 Hassan Hajjaj was published by the Maison Europeenne de la Photographie, Paris.

== Exhibitions ==
Hajjaj's work has featured at the Brooklyn Museum, New York City; the British Museum, London; the Nasher Museum of Art, Duke University, Durham, NC; Fotografiska Stockholm, Fotografiska Tallinn, Fotografiska New York, the Newark Museum, New Jersey; Los Angeles County Museum of Art, Los Angeles; Los Angeles Museum of Contemporary Art, Los Angeles; the Victoria & Albert Museum, London; the Farjam Collection, Dubai; Institut du Monde Arabe, Paris; the Kamel Lazaar Foundation, Tunisia; and Virginia Museum of Fine Art, Richmond, VA.

== Honours ==
On August 22, 2016, he was decorated as an Officer of the Ouissam Al Moukafâa Al Wataniya — the Order of National Merit — by King Mohammed VI.
