= Ahmed Cherkaoui =

Moroccan painter

- Born: 2 October 1934; Boujad, Morocco
- Died: 17 August 1967 (aged 32); Casablanca, Morocco
- Education: École des métiers d'art, Paris; École des Beaux-Arts, Paris; School of Fine Arts, Warsaw
- Known for: Abstract painting
- Style: Abstract art incorporating traditional Moroccan motifs
- Movement: Moroccan modernism
- Patrons: UNESCO (research support)

Ahmed Cherkaoui (2 October 1934 – 17 August 1967) was a Moroccan painter who worked in oil, gouache, and watercolour.

== Education ==
Born in Boujad, Cherkaoui studied at the École des métiers d'art and the École des Beaux-Arts in Paris, winning a scholarship in 1961 to the School of Fine Arts in Warsaw.

== Works ==
He was influenced by Western artists including Paul Klee, Roger Bissière, and Henri Matisse and by traditional Moroccan art which he studied with support from UNESCO. He began exhibiting in 1959. His style was abstract but used motifs from Moroccan tattoos, pottery, leatherwork, weaving, ornaments, and architecture. Until 1965 his paintings had combinations of dark colours; from that point on his style was more light and spacious. From 1966 he applied his style to leather as a medium.

== Death and legacy ==
He died 17 August 1967 in Casablanca after a routine operation. Posthumous exhibitions of his art were held in Paris and in Rabat.
