= Batoul S'Himi =

Moroccan sculptor

- Born: 1974 (age 51–52); Asilah, Morocco
- Occupation: sculptor

Batoul S'Himi (born 1974 in Asilah, Morocco) is a Moroccan sculptor whose work often addresses gender inequality and social change. She is best known for her series World Under Pressure, in which she created sculptures from pressure cookers and other domestic tools and appliances. These works address concerns including environmental pressures. S'Himi's work is included in the Smithsonian permanent collection.

== Exhibitions ==
Her work has been included in exhibitions in several countries, including:

Year	Exhibition	Venue	Location
2008 - 2015	World Under Pressure	De Meelfabriek	Leiden, Netherlands
2012	Intense proximité	Palais de Tokyo	Paris, France
2013	Monde Arabe Sous Pression	Barjeel Art Foundation	Sharjah, United Arab Emirates
2014	Earth Matters: Land as Material and Metaphor in the Arts of Africa	Smithsonian	Washington, D.C., United States
2019 - 2022	I Am...Contemporary Women Artists of Africa	Smithsonian	Washington, D.C., United States
2020	Group Exhibition	Galerie Dominique Fiat	Paris, France
