= Chtouka =

- Rural commune and town
- Interactive map of Chtouka
- Coordinates: 33.3133°N 8.1653°W
- Country: Morocco
- Region: Casablanca-Settat
- Province: El Jadida Province

Population (2024)
  - Total: 38,021
- Time zone: UTC+0 (GMT)

Chtouka is a small town and rural commune in El Jadida Province of the Casablanca-Settat region of Morocco. At the time of the 2004 census, the commune had a total population of 38,021 people living in 7,746 households.

It is named after the Chtouka tribe of Doukkala, who trace their origin to Chtouka Aït Baha Province.
