= Chaïbia Talal =

Moroccan painter (1929–2004)

- Born: 1929; Chtouka, Morocco
- Died: April 2, 2004 (aged 74–75); Casablanca, Morocco
- Known for: Painting
- Movement: naive art

Chaïbia Talal (Arabic: الشعيبية طلال; 1929 – April 2, 2004) was a Moroccan painter.

== Biography ==
Chaïbia was born in Chtouka, a small village near El Jadida, Morocco, in 1929. At the age of 13, she was sent by her parents to Casablanca to marry a 70-year-old man. She gave birth to a son, Hocein, at the age of 14 and became a widow at 15. After her husband's death, she worked as a maid to support herself and her son. Talal was devoted to providing her son with an education, particularly academic literacy, although Talal herself would remain illiterate her entire life. After receiving art supplies from strangers in a dream, she was inspired to begin painting.

Her work was not initially well received in the Moroccan art world. Talal's son became a respected artist in his own right. In 1965, he introduced her to Pierre Gaudibert, director of the Musée d'Art Moderne de Paris in Paris, who was impressed by her work. Following this meeting, her works were exhibited at the Goethe-institute in Casablanca and the Museum of Modern Art in Paris in 1966.

As a self-taught artist, Talal was known for breaking traditional boundaries. Her work is categorized as "outsider art," which describes unconventional art created outside traditional art movements. She was influenced by artists from the CoBrA painting movement. Her work has also been described as naïve art by some writers, including journalist Ahmed El Fassi.

In 2015, Moroccan filmmaker Youssef Britel created a biographical film entitled Chaïbia. The film was written by David Villemin and Youssef Britel and starred Saadia Azgoun as Chaïbia Talal.

In 2004, Talal died of a heart attack in Casablanca at the age of 75.

Talal's work continues to be shown, including during the Qatar-Morocco 2024 Year of Culture, where her work was included in the section on Women in Society.

== Expositions ==
- 1966 – Goethe-Institut, Casablanca, Morocco
- 1966 – Solstice Gallery, Paris, France
- 1966 – Salon des Surindépendants, Musée d'Art Moderne de Paris, Paris, France
- 1969 – "Ecole marocaine", Copenhagen, Denmark
- 1969 – "Kunstkabinett", Frankfurt, Germany
- 1970 – "Les Halles aux Idées", Paris, France
- 1971 – "Dar America", Casablanca, Rabat, Marrakesh, Fez, Tangier, Morocco
- 1972 – Ventes aux enchères, Drouot, Paris, France
- 1973 – "L'œil de Bœuf" gallery (CIPAC), Paris, France
- 1974 – "Ivan Spence" gallery, Ibiza, Spain
- 1974 – "Salon des Réalités Nouvelles", Paris, France
- 1976 – "Biennale d'Art", Menton, France
- 1977 – "Salon de Mai", Musée d'Art Moderne, Paris, France
- 1977 – "Salon des Réalités Nouvelles", Paris – France
- 1980 – "Engel gallery", Rotterdam, Netherlands
- 1980 – "Fondation Joan Miró", Barcelona, Spain

== Awards ==
- Gold medal of the French Academic Society for Education and Encouragement. - March 2003.
