= Mohammed VI Museum of Modern and Contemporary Art =

Contemporary and modern art museum in Rabat, Morocco

Coordinates: 34.0153°N 6.8328°W

- متحف محمد السادس للفن الحديث والمعاصر
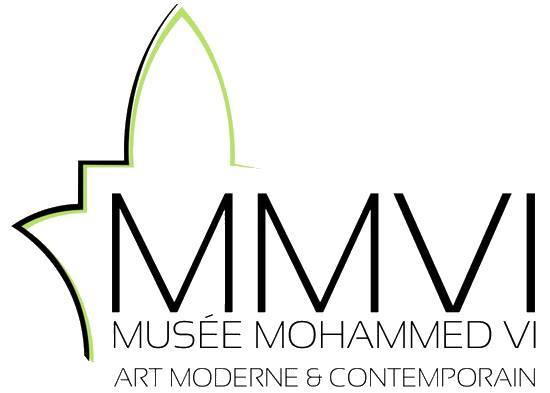

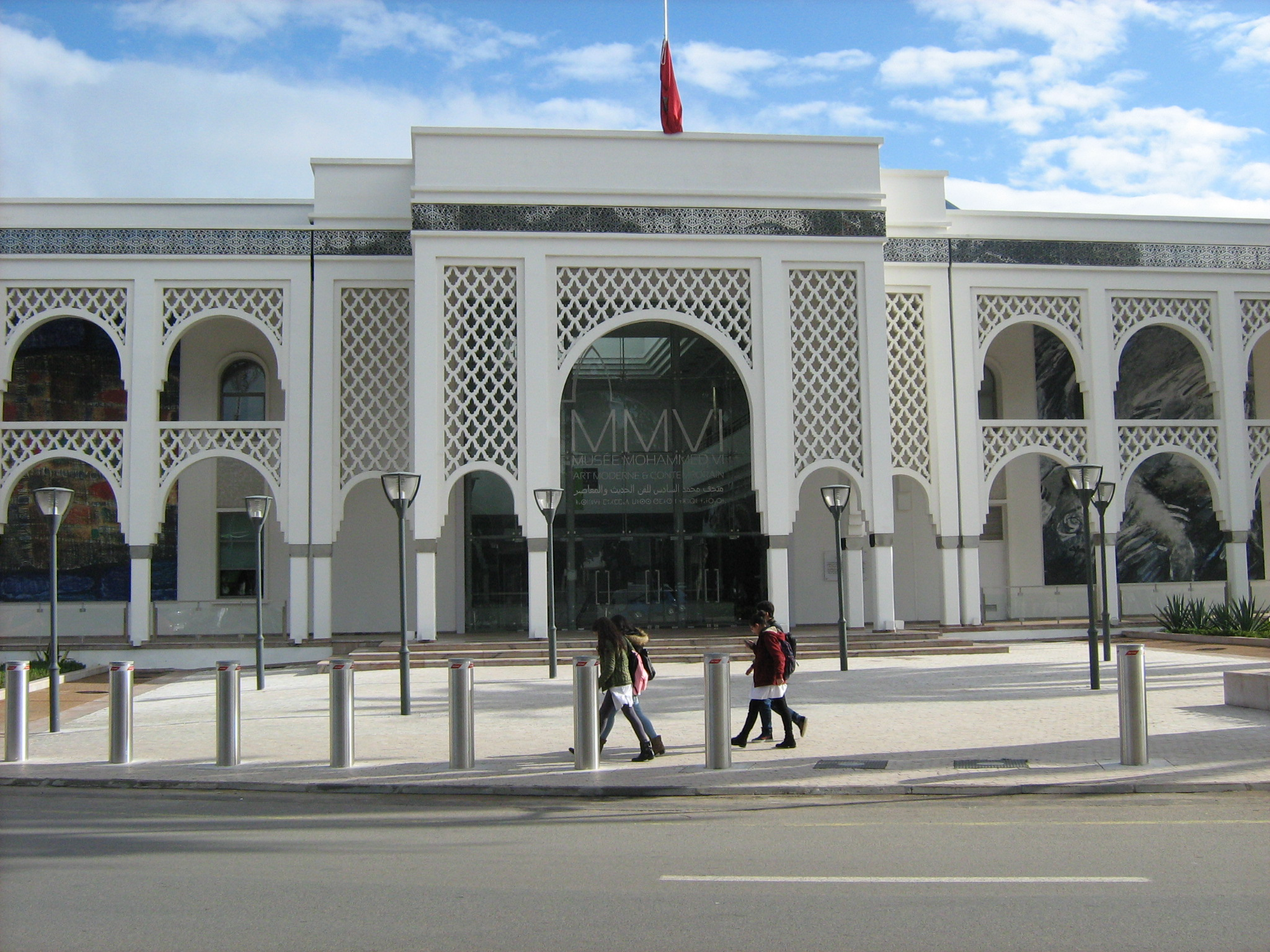
- Location: Rabat, Morocco

The Mohammed VI Museum of Modern and Contemporary Art, abbreviated MMVI, (Arabic: متحف محمد السادس للفن الحديث والمعاصر, romanized: Matḥaf Muḥammad al-Sādis lil-Fann al-Hadīth wa-al-Muʻāṣir) is a contemporary and modern art museum in Rabat, Morocco which opened in 2014. It is one of fourteen museums of the National Foundation of Museums of Morocco. The museum curates modern and contemporary Moroccan and international art. The MMVI is the first large scale museum built in Morocco since independence from France in 1956. It was the first Moroccan public museum to meet International Museography Standards. The museum houses the works of 200 Moroccan artists, including Hassan Hajjaj and Ahmed Yacoubi.

== Background ==
The museum was founded in 2014 by Mohammed VI, the King of Morocco, in Rabat.

The museum was created to preserve and disseminate to the public the heritage of Moroccan art and encourage the creativity of Moroccan artists. It forms part of a wider Moroccan cultural infrastructure including the National Library of the Kingdom of Morocco and the Mohammed V National Theatre.

Rabat was chosen for the location of the museum because it is the capital of Morocco; it is a Unesco World Heritage Site (2012) and is a popular tourist destination. The inaugural exhibition was entitled "1914 – 2014: 100 Years of Creation".

== Mission ==
The museum curates Moroccan artistic creation in the plastic and visual arts from the beginning of the 20th century onwards. The museum values modern and contemporary Moroccan culture as well as Moroccan artistic and cultural heritage and makes it accessible to the public. This involves referencing, researching, conserving and promoting the art of Morocco. The museum introduces art to young people, promotes artworks by young people and teaches respect for art. It also teaches history of art and assists scientific research in the artistic field.

== Architecture ==
The museum took ten years to build in central Rabat. The museum's architecture incorporates features of Rabat's identity and urbanism; Morocco's cultural diversity; the harmony of Morocco's secular heritage and reworked traditional motifs. The architecture links past to present with Arab-Moorish inspiration in a modern building. However, the design is also a statement of the will to continue in Morocco a well-established tradition of modernity.

=== The arcades ===
The outermost façade, called the "architectural skin", is of Arab-Moorish inspiration. It is white with a colonnade of double arches. The cloisters have a motif called "Keef was Darja". The double arches project shadows onto the building according to the light and the seasons. The museum is most easily recognised by the arches.

=== Chromatic facade ===
A chromatic façade invites the public to events and exhibitions at the museum. It displays large reproductions of works by Chaibia, Hassan El Glaoui, Mohamed Kacimi, Gharbaoui and Melehi. The largest displays are 7 metres (23 ft) by 15 metres (49 ft). In the evenings, colourful lights are projected onto the building.

=== Visual axes ===
The museum has two clear lines of sight, each commencing with an entrance. The east – west axis is lit by sunsets at the winter solstice. Where the clear lines of sight cross, there is a patio atrium for events and temporary exhibitions surrounded by a tea room, bookshop, educational workshops and an auditorium.

=== Interior ===
The interior spaces are defined by variations in height, from single to triple. Natural light also helps define the spaces.

=== Floors ===
The floors of the halls, corridors and stairs are decorated with traditionally inspired abstract patterns. The patterns are designed as intuitive signage with the job of helping visitors to understand the building's geometric design.

=== Ornaments ===
The main theme of the building is a stylized motif. It is worked in a variety of ways such as laser cutting, cast plaster, and chiselled nickel silver. There is a polished stainless steel laser-cut frieze and a similar design made in moulded plaster decorating the light wells. The columns of the atrium are dressed in nickel silver with hand-carved motifs by the artisans of Fez.
