= Safaa Erruas =

Moroccan 21st-century visual artist

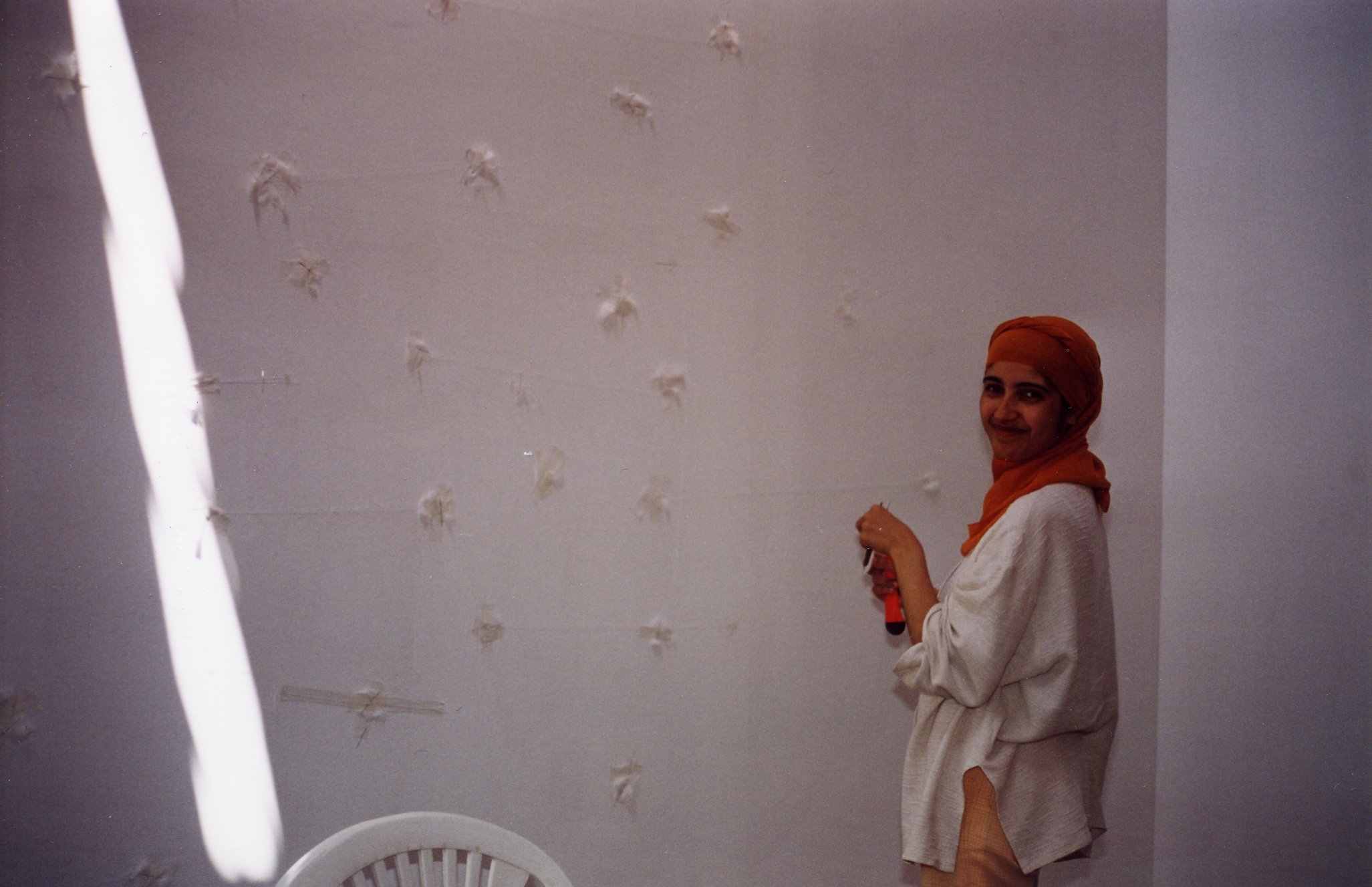
- Born: 1976 (age 49–50); Tétouan, Morocco
- Education: Institut National des Beaux-Arts de Tétouan, Morocco
- Occupation: Artist

Safaa (or Safâa) Erruas, born in 1976 in Tétouan, is a Moroccan artist.

== Biography ==
Safaa Erruas was born in 1976 in Tétouan, Morocco. After a year of higher education at the Faculty of Sciences of Tétouan, she changed her course of studies and opted for artistic training. She graduated from the Institut National des Beaux-Arts de Tétouan in 1998. Her work, abstract and minimalist, is most often dominated by a single color, white, which symbolizes for her, immateriality, silence, fragility in drawings that also include sutures, cuts and seams, like unhealed wounds. She also includes pointed or sharp elements, such as needles, razor blades, knives, and thread.

== Career ==
Erruas lives and works in Tétouan, and exhibits in Morocco, and since 1998, internationally. When she had finished her artistic studies and obtained her diploma, she participated in "Morocco time," an exhibition organized by Jean-Louis Froment, founder of the CAPC musée d'art contemporain de Bordeaux. She then lived as an artist in residence for six months at the Cité internationale des arts in Paris. In 2002, she participated in the fifth Dakar Biennale, and again in the seventh Dakar Biennale (2006), when she was one of the artists to win an award. In 2009, she was also selected as one of five significant female artists of the new generation of female artists in the Muslim world for a New York exhibition organized by MoCADA (Museum of Contemporary African Diasporan Arts). In 2016, her work was exhibited in Paris as part of the Contemporary Art and Design Fair focused on Africa, Also Known As Africa (AKAA), at the Carreau du Temple, then again in 2018 at the same fair. She also exhibited in 2017 in London in an annual fair devoted to contemporary art from the African continent. Erruas's works are held in collections such as the Moroccan Royal Palace, the Société Générale (Morocco), the Caisse de dépôt et de gestion (Morocco), the ONA Foundation in Morocco, the Jean Paul Blachère Foundation in Apt, and the Center for contemporary art in Lagos, Nigeria. From February 24 to May 1, 2022, she participated in the exhibition, "African Voices," with Mounir Fatmi, Maimouna Gerresi, and Kyle Weeks, in Milan.
