= Malika Agueznay =

Moroccan visual artist (born 1934)

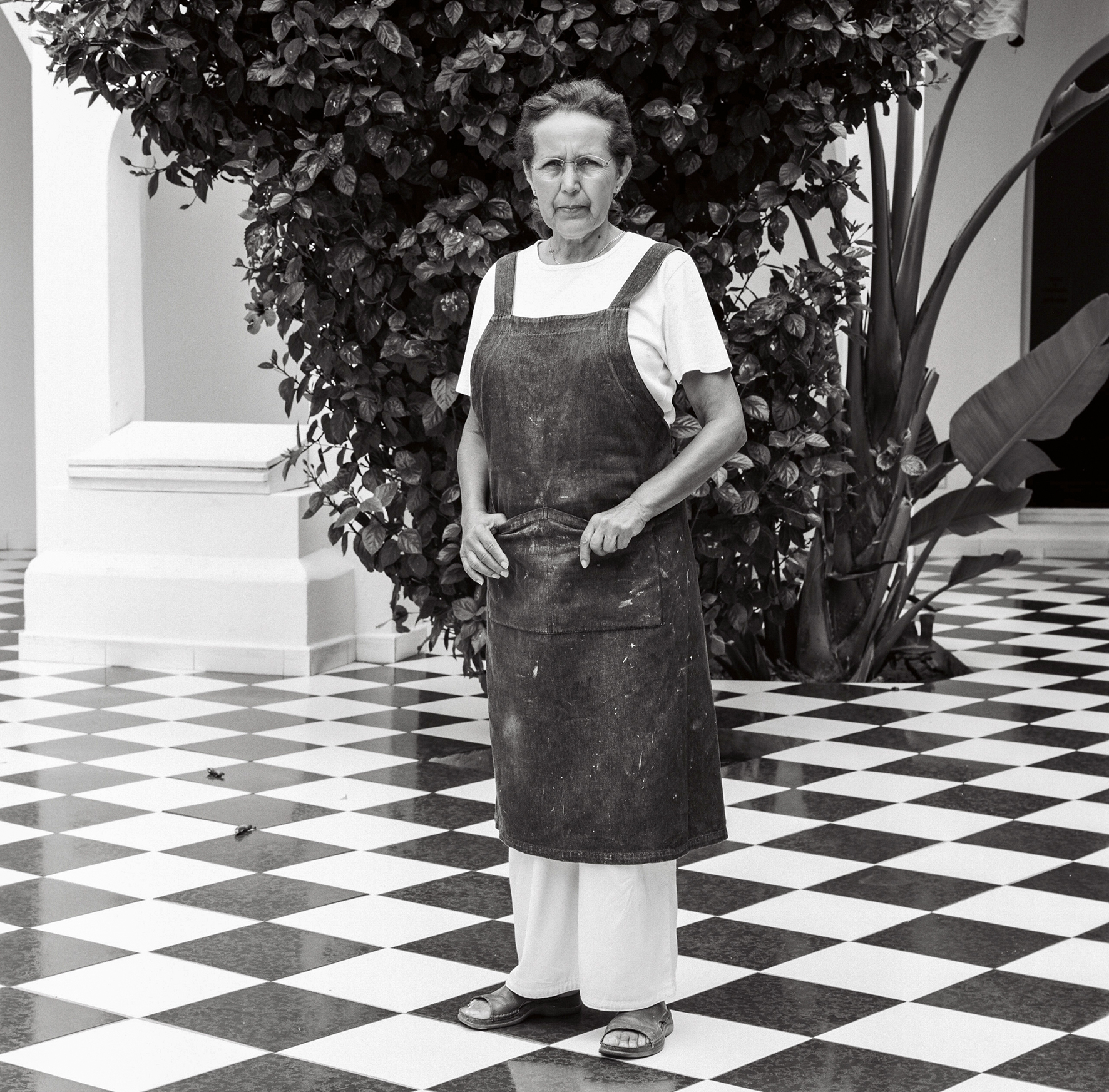
- Born: 1934 (age 91–92); Marrakesh, Morocco
- Education: École des Beaux-Arts of Casablanca
- Known for: Painting, public murals, engraving
- Movement: Casablanca Art School
- Children: Amina Agueznay (daughter)

Malika Agueznay (born 1934 in Marrakesh, Morocco) is a Moroccan visual artist. For her contributions to modern art and abstraction in the history of Moroccan visual art, she became internationally known as Morocco’s first woman Modernist artist and member of the experimental Casablanca Art School.

== Life and career ==
From 1966 to 1970, Agueznay was the first young woman who studied at the École des Beaux-Arts of Casablanca. Under the direction of artists Farid Belkahia, Mohammed Melehi and Mohamed Chabâa, the new orientation of this art school had favoured experimental and modernist approaches, teaching abstract art characterized by modernist forms, lines, geometric patterns and primary colours. Further, the projects of the Casablanca Art School. were characterized by their collaborative works and public engagement in open spaces.

Already as a student in 1968, Agueznay created an acrylic relief with navy blue biomorphic seaweed motifs that would later become a recurrent motif in her creations. Continuing throughout her career, Agueznay developed abstract shapes of seaweed as a recurrent motif. While influenced by her teachers such as Melehi and fellow artists, she explored an "abstraction that evoked femininity and her own female perspective".

Over time, Agueznay has incorporated the seaweed form in different ways, in effect, pulling it in different directions: as pure abstraction, as the foundation for calligraphic text, as part of a distinct plant formation, or as a specific evocation of the female body. She has also used it across mediums, placing it at the center of her multifaceted practice, which has extended from printmaking and painting to sculpture and woodwork.

— Holiday Powers, Opening the Path for a Feminine Abstraction: Malika Agueznay and the Casablanca School

In 1978, she participated in the first artists' workshop known as Cultural Moussem of Asilah, working in the technique of engraving as the first woman printmaker in Morocco. After participating in the workshop of Roman Artymowski, she continued to study in New York in the workshops of Mohammad Omar Khalil and Robert Blackburn. In further editions of the Moussem in Asilah with Khalil, Blackburn and Krishna Reddy, she exhibited her prints in group exhibitions starting in 1979. In 1981, Agueznay participated in a public art project the psychiatric hospital of Berrechid, where she painted a ten-meter-long mural. In 1985, she created another large-scale mural in Asilah as part of the festival. As artist and art teacher, she participated in the Asilah international art festival for more than twenty years.

Malika Agueznay is the mother of visual artist Amina Agueznay. Together, they have created artworks such as the site-specific exhibition Metamorphosis at the Attijariwafa Bank Foundation in Rabat 2018.

== Reception ==
From May 2023 to January 2024, Tate St Ives art gallery in Wales, UK, and later the Sharjah Art Foundation in the United Arab Emirates (February-June 2024), showed an exhibition titled "The Casablanca Art School: Platforms and Patterns for a Postcolonial Avant-Garde (1962-1987)". The same exhibition, including works by Agueznay and other members of the Casablanca Art School, was presented by the Schirn Kunsthalle in Frankfurt, Germany, between July and October 2024. This exhibition presented almost 100 works by 22 artists and documents from the historical period of the Casablanca Art School.

== Selected exhibitions ==
- 1968: Group exhibition with other students of the Casablanca Art School
- 2021: Moroccan Trilogy 1950-2020 at the Reina Sofia Museum, Madrid
- 2020 - 2022: Taking Shape: Abstraction from the Arab World, 1950s–1980s, various exhibition spaces in US universities
- 2020: Solo exhibition "Malika Agueznay comme en 68", Casablanca
- 2022: Mohamed Melehi - Malika Agueznay - Marion Boehm - Mous Lamrabat - Mohamed Lekleti, Art Dubai, UAE
- 2023 - 2024: The Casablanca Art School: Platforms and Patterns for a Postcolonial Avant-Garde (1962-1987), St. Ives, Sharjah, Frankfurt

== See also ==
- Culture of Morocco, Visual arts
