= Museum of African Contemporary Art Al Maaden =

Coordinates: 31°36′01″N 7°57′00″W

- Musée d'Art Contemporain Africain Al Maaden
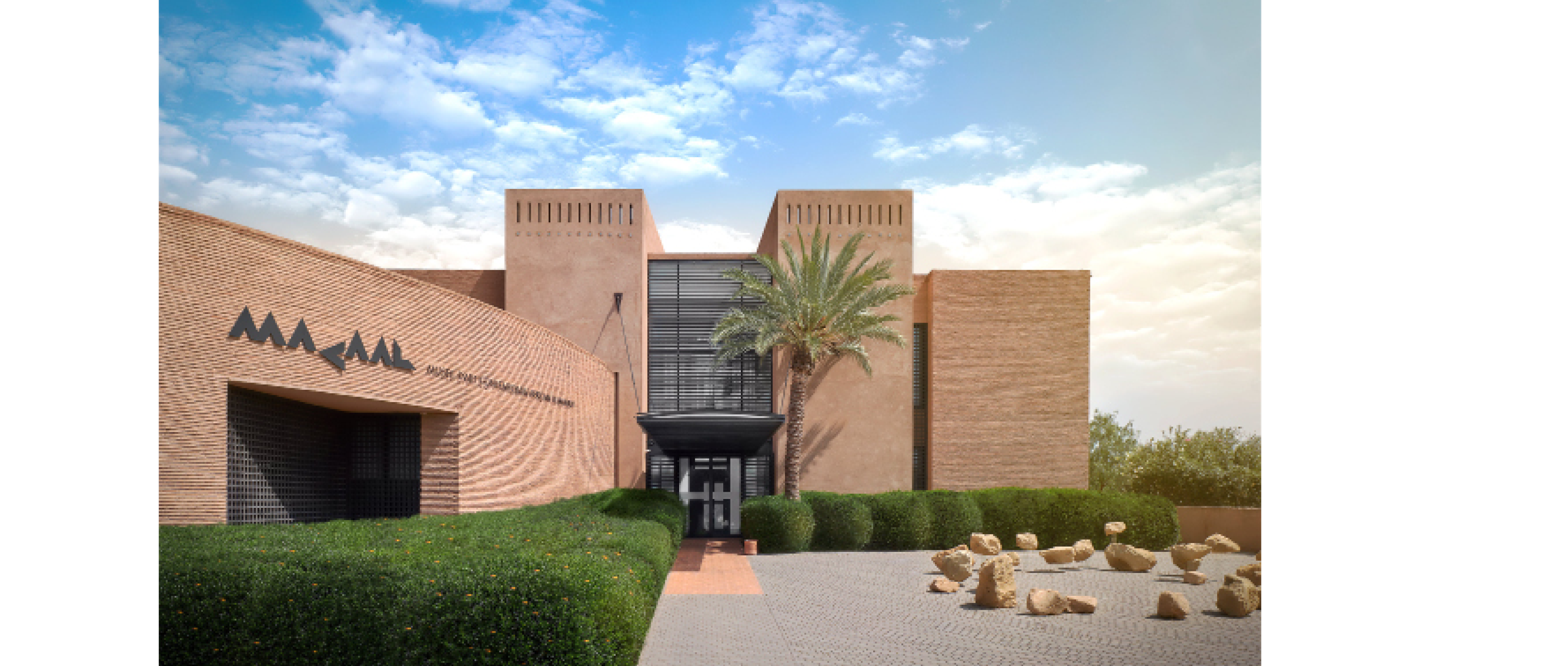
- The MACAAL building in 2019

- Location within Morocco
- Established: 2016
- Location: Marrakesh, Morocco
- Type: Contemporary art museum
- President: Othman Lazraq
- Website: https://macaal.org/

The Museum of African Contemporary Art Al Maaden (French: Musée d'Art Contemporain Africain Al Maaden) or MACAAL, is an independent, nonprofit museum of contemporary art in Marrakesh, Morocco. The museum opened in November 2016 on the occasion of the 2016 United Nations Climate Change Conference, which was held in that city, and it was officially inaugurated in February 2018. It is overseen by the architect and real estate heir Othman Lazraq.

== Background ==
The Museum of African Contemporary Art Al Maaden has its basis in the collection of the real estate tycoon and philanthropist couple Alami and Farida Lazraq, whose company, Alliances Développement Immobilier, established a corporate foundation to promote African art. Their son, the architect Othman Lazraq, runs the museum, and Meriem Berrada is its artistic director.

== Location and building ==
MACAAL is located to the southeast of Marrakesh, near the Sidi Youssef Ben Ali neighborhood and next to the Al Maaden Golf Resort, which is also owned by the Lazraq family. The golf course also features the Al Maaden Sculpture Park, which was established in 2013.

The MACAAL building was designed by the French architect Didier Lefort. After closing in the spring of 2023 and undergoing that year's Al Haouz earthquake, the building underwent structural evaluations and significant renovations to include eight exhibition spaces over two floors, seven of which are dedicated to the museum's permanent collection. It reopened in February 2025.

== Collection ==
The Lazarac and Alliances Foundation collection comprises more than 2,000 works of modern and contemporary art from Morocco and across Africa, described as "one of the most comprehensive private holdings on the continent." It is primarily composed of paintings, but it also includes works on paper and in other mediums, such as photography, sculpture, textile, installation, and video. Artists represented in the collection include Farid Belkahia, Mohamed Melehi, Bodo, Salah Elmur, Billie Zangewa, Leila Alaoui, and Malick Sidibé, with the most heavily featured artist being Morocco's Ahmed Cherkaoui.
