= Roman Artymowski =

- Born: 11 August 1919; Lvov, Poland
- Died: 3 February 1993 (aged 74); Łowicz, Poland
- Education: Academy of Fine Arts, Krakow
- Known for: Painter
- Movement: Abstract art

Roman Artymowski (11 August 1919 in Lviv - 3 February 1993 in Łowicz) was a Polish painter, educator, and one of the representatives of abstractive Polish post-war art.

== Life and career ==
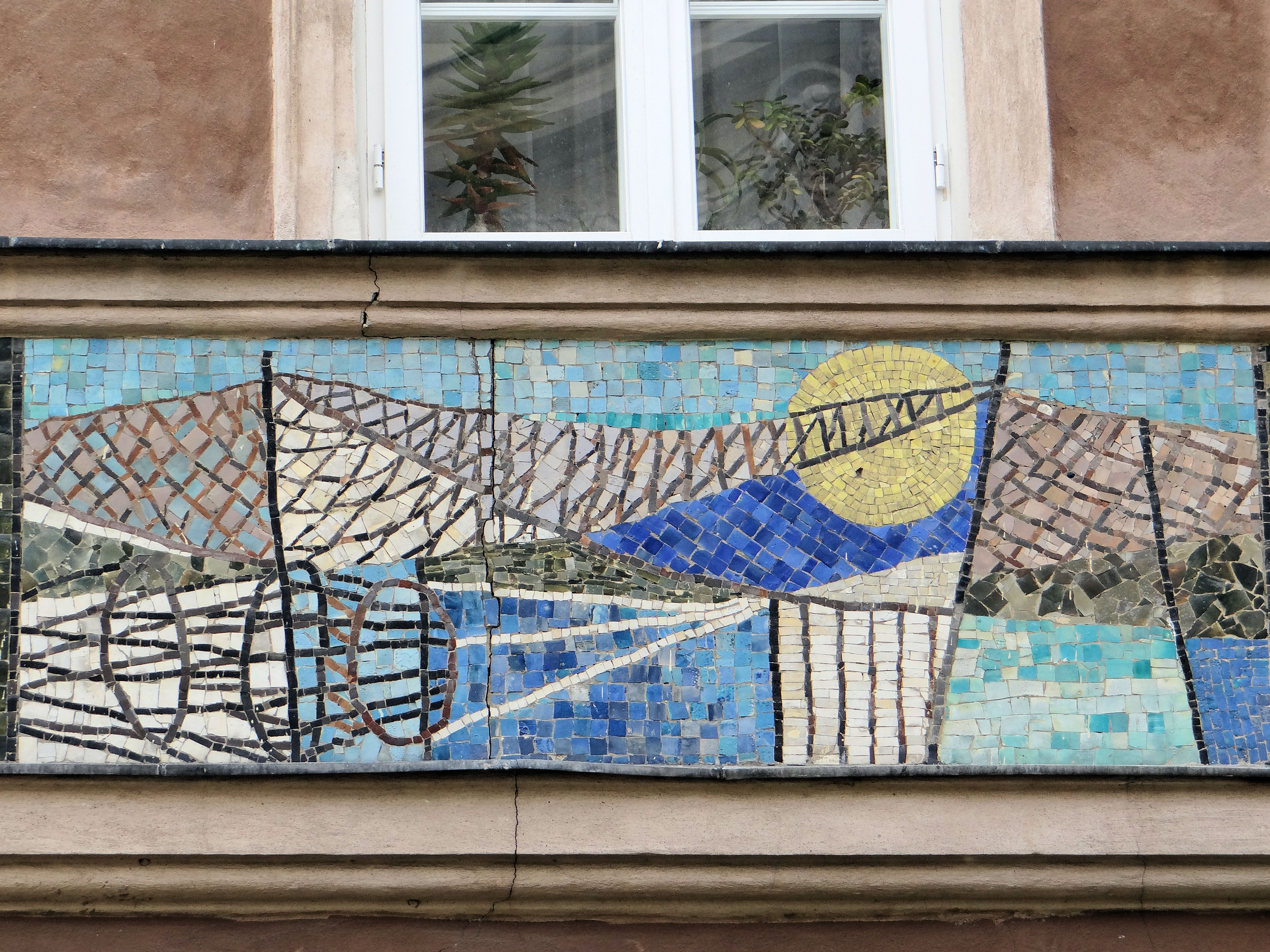
Mosaics at 2, Mostowa Street in Warsaw

Roman Artymowski was born on 11 August in 1919 in Lviv, Ukraine (Polish Łwów), the son of Vladimir Artymowski and Celestyny Prydów. In 1939 he graduated from high school in Nowy Sacz. Then in 1939-1945 he fought in the branch AGM during World War II and then in the Army in the province of Krakow and Kielce. From July 1944 was a guerrilla battalion scouting and sabotage, was wounded in action. During this period Roman was interested in poetry. As a member of the Krakow poetry group "Otherwise," published his poems in her jednodniówce issued by .

After the war in 1945 he began studies at the Academy of Fine Arts in Krakow. His teachers were Eugene Eibisch (painting), Andrew Jurkiewicz, Konrad Srzednicki (graphics) and Czeslaw Rzepiński (Figure). In 1947 he began working with "Review of Art" as the author of the review of the exhibition. Along with other students of Fine Arts in Krakow and Warsaw at the invitation of the International Union of Students, he visited Holland. During his studies he was a member, organized around Andrzej Wroblewski, Association of Academic self-education groups of Polish Youth. In October (23-25) 1949, first exhibited his work was done during the Interschool sorts of State Universities Arts in Poznan. Roman's studies completed his degree in prof. E. Eibisch of Fine Arts in Krakow.

Married to journalist Sophie Karas. In the years 1950-1952 he worked at the Academy of Fine Arts in Warsaw as a senior assistant professor. E. Eibisch the Faculty of Painting. After the reorganization, Art Review, and editor of its duties by Mieczyslaw Porębski in 1952, became editor Artymowski technical writing. He married again, his wife was Sophia Bochenków. In the years 1952-1959 he worked as a graphic editor of the magazine World. Then, in the years 1953-1956, along with other artists, old and young generation, Artymowski took part in the execution of murals restored buildings of the Old and New Town in Warsaw. His murals are the work of the old tenements and tenement Market Street. Ecclesiastical 7 / 9, graffiti house at ul.Nowomiejska 4/6/8 and mosaic building at ul. Bridge. The contribution to the polychrome Old Town Square, Artymowski along with other artists in 1953 received the State Award Grade II. In 1955 he traveled to Denmark. In 1957, after his appointment as editor of Art Review by Aleksander Wojciechowski, Artymowski joined the reformed magazine Editorial Team. This cooperation continued until the solution Art Review in 1960.

In the spring of 1957 he traveled to Artymowski Yugoslavia, organized in conjunction with the exhibition there of contemporary Polish painting. In 1958, Roman was Artymowski consecutive trips, visited the Arab countries and Italy. "Since 1958, for 1 year worked as a reviewer of the journal, Polish Perspective.

28 February 1959 the gallery opened Crooked Circle Artymowski first solo exhibition.

The creator of the work presented, that arose under the influence of a trip to Italy. Images have gained the favor of critics, among them Professor John Bialystok, who appreciated them, "the poetic eloquence of the imagination".

In June, the artist for the first time he went to Baghdad. His task was to organize an exhibition of Polish contemporary art. In the years 1959-1960 is in Iraq, covering the graphic arts and paper parts of the Institute of Fine Arts and Tahreer College in Baghdad. The work of his students are shown at the Festival of Arts in Baghdad. At this time Artymowski paid special attention to water-color painting, which later was to become his favorite medium.

Between 1960-1969 he was artistic director of the magazine The Polish Review. In 1961 took place Artymowski second solo exhibition, this time at the Art Gallery ZPAP (MDM) in Warsaw, which showed watercolors from the years 1958-1961. Between 1962-1967 worked as a manager of the Department of Graphic Art in the newly established Academy of Fine Arts in Baghdad. In 1963 his work was honored with the medal of teaching the Iraqi Union of Teachers. While in Iraq he was a member Artymowski Iraqi Artists Association.

In 1964, he traveled to Spain and France. In 1968, the Gallery of Modern shown mirages - Artymowski prepared by a series of slides prepared with accompanying music. Start of cooperation with the National Academy of Fine Arts in Lodz in the years 1969-1971. He led the Painting and Drawing Workshop at the Department of Textiles. Artymowski 1970 he returned to carry out monumental mosaics in the House following the funeral of Communal Cemetery in Warsaw.

In 1971 he received the Prize II Artymowski the Minister of Culture and the Arts for outstanding teaching. In the years 1971-1974 he was rector of the Academy of Fine Arts in Lodz. In 1972-1975 he was associate professor and director, he founded the Department of Graphic Art, Faculty of Graphic Fine Arts in Lodz. He was also the local studio lithographic techniques. For students of this school has prepared a script to Fri Introduction to the issue of painting technology. In 1973, receives Award of the Minister of Culture and the Arts for artistic achievement and teaching. Starts renovation of the palace of General Stanislaw Klicki in Lovich, who became his home and studio. Receives the Grand Medal Drawing Triennial in Wroclaw in 1974. During the years 1975-1976 he worked in the Painting Department of Fine Arts in Warsaw. Artymowski was head of the Department of Painting Techniques and Technologies. He conducted graduate seminar at the Faculty of Fine Arts at the University of Damascus in 1976. Between 1976-1979 he was in Iraq, he was Professor of Postgraduate Studies Academy of Fine Arts Baghdad University. In 1978, Graphic Art Workshop organized and led a seminar for L'Association Culturelle AL Mouhit in Asilah (Morocco). After returning to the Polish in 1979, led Artymowski Technology Laboratory at the Faculty of Painting, Painting Fine Arts in Warsaw until 1982. In 1980 he traveled to the United States. In 1982, received the extraordinary professor at the Warsaw Academy of Fine Arts. In the years 1983-1984 served as rector Artymowski of Fine Arts in Warsaw. In 1984 Artymowski received second prize at the First National Triennial watercolor in Lublin.1988-1993 received a full professor at the Warsaw Academy of Fine Arts. Together with his wife Zofia Artymowski founded in 1992, the foundation "Polish Promotion of Visual Art", based in Łowicz.

On 3 February 1993 Roman Artymowski died in Łowicz.
