= Mohamed Melehi =

Moroccan painter (1936–2020)

- محمد المليحي
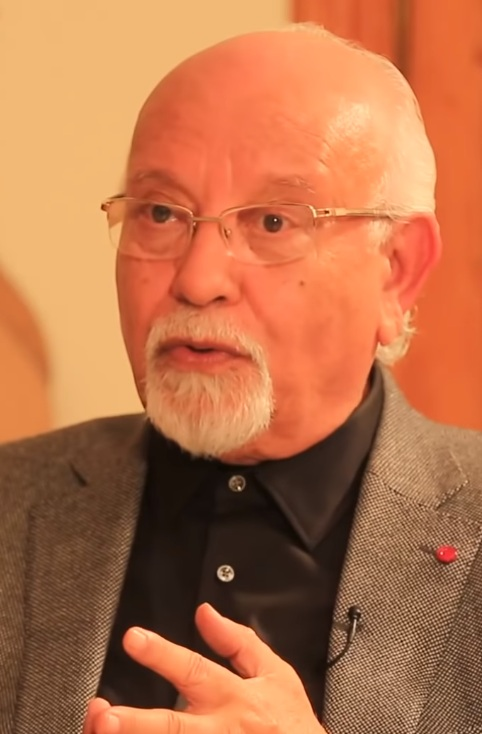
- Melehi interviewed on 24 May 2019
- Born: 12 November 1936; Asilah, Morocco
- Died: 28 October 2020 (aged 83); Boulogne-Billancourt, France
- Movement: Casablanca school

Mohammed Melehi (Arabic: محمد المليحي; 12 November 1936 – 28 October 2020) was a Moroccan painter associated with the Casablanca school, a modernist art movement active in the 1960s in Morocco.

== Early life ==
Melehi was born in Asilah, Morocco. He studied at the School of Fine Arts of Tetuan (1953–1955), then at the Real Academia de Bellas Artes de Santa Isabel de Hungría in Seville (1955), the Real Academia de Bellas Artes de San Fernando (1956), Accademia di Belle Arti di Roma (1960), and the Académie des Beaux-Arts (1957–1960). He then studied at the École nationale supérieure des Beaux-Arts in Paris. He then moved to Minneapolis hoping to study architecture, but started teaching painting at the Minneapolis School of Art instead. He then received a Rockefeller Foundation fellowship and attended Columbia University in New York (1962–1964).

Time Square (1963)

== Career ==
Melehi became a professor at the School of Fine Arts of Casablanca, teaching painting, sculpture, and photography (1964 - 1969). At the time, the school was directed by Farid Belkahia, with whom Melehi would form the Casablanca school movement. He died in Paris.

=== Exposition-Manifeste ===
In 1969, Melehi and his colleagues of the Casablanca school, including Farid Belkahia, Mohamed Chabâa, Mohamed Ataallah, Mohamed Hamidi and Mustapha Hafid organized an exposition-manifeste, or protest exhibition, entitled Présence plastique. The artists displayed their works in Jemaa el-Fnaa in the Marrakesh medina, snubbing an official Moroccan art salon of happening at the same time. This exhibition is regarded as the founding moment of modernism in Morocco.

"We took a position against the government", Melehi said in an interview with The Guardian, "Our works were in Jemaa el-Fnaa square for a week, exposed to the sun and wind. It was an ideological message about what art could be."

== Death ==
Melehi died at the Ambroise Paré Hospital in Boulogne-Billancourt near Paris at the age of 84 a few days after being infected with COVID-19 during the COVID-19 pandemic in France.
