= Majida Khattari =

Moroccan French artist

- Born: 1966 (age 59–60); Erfoud, Morocco
- Education: School of Fine Arts of Casablanca, Beaux-Arts de Paris
- Website: http://majidakhattari.com/

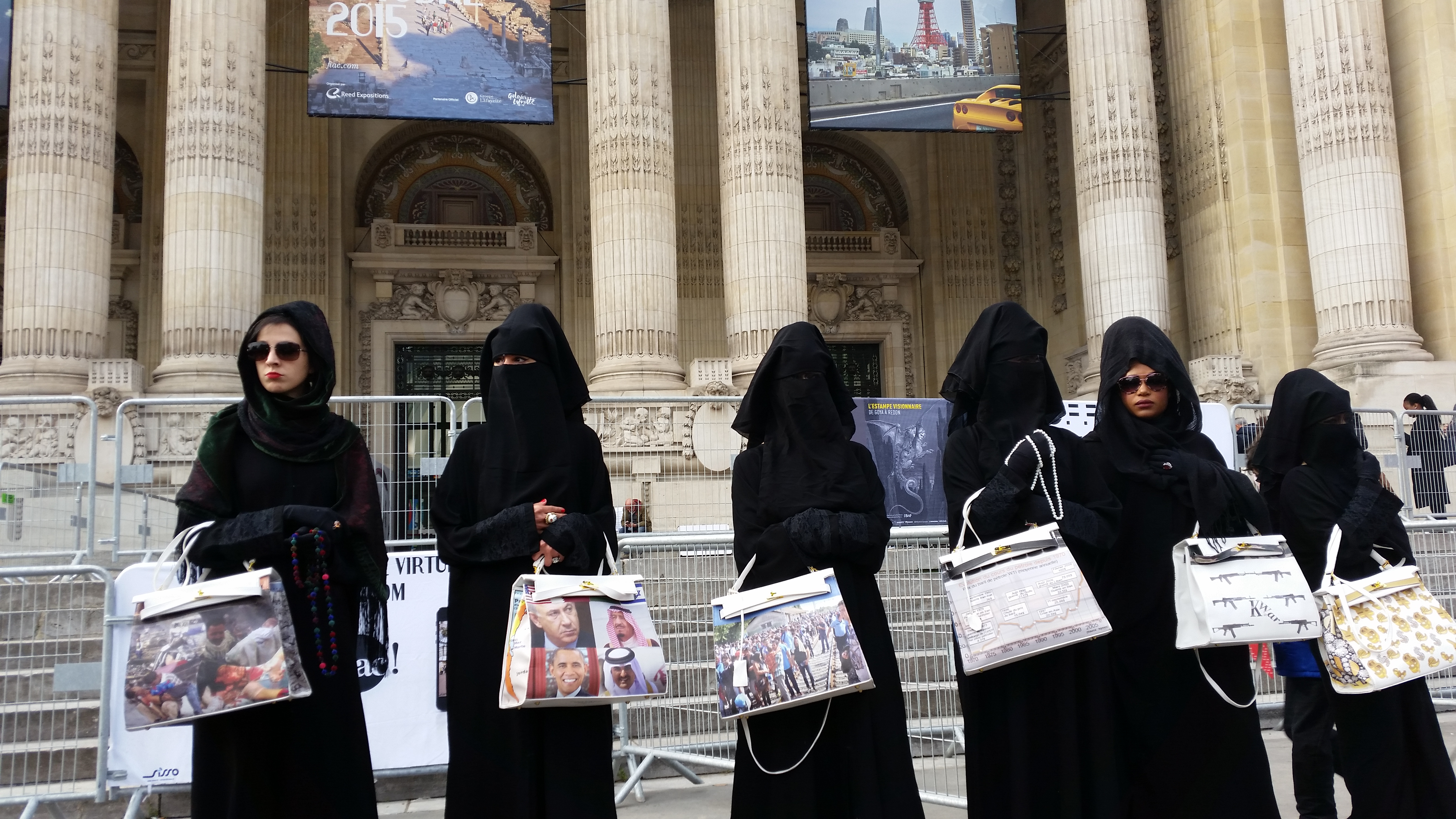
Majida Khattari performance, FIAC 2015 Paris

Majida Khattari (born 1966) is a Moroccan-born French multidisciplinary contemporary artist. Her work often addresses fashion and women's bodies in contemporary Islam. She is known for staged fashion-show performances that connect Western-style fashion shows with Islamic dress and culture. She is known for her staged fashion show performances, which connect Western-style fashion shows to Islamic dress and culture.

== Biography ==
Majida Khattari was born in 1966 in Erfoud, Morocco. She attended the School of Fine Arts of Casablanca, where she received a diploma in 1988. She moved to Paris that year to attend the Beaux-Arts de Paris, where she received a national higher diploma in plastic arts in 1995.

Shortly after she arrived in Paris, the Islamic scarf controversy in France began in September 1989, when three female students were suspended for refusing to remove their scarves at a middle school in Creil. The controversy became international news. This debate provided inspiration for her artwork.

Khattari's art is created in many different media, including photography, performance art, sculpture, video art, and installation art. Her work has been shown internationally, including in Canada in 2015, as well as in London, Paris, and New York City.

== See also ==
- Culture of Morocco
