= Mohamed Chabâa =

Moroccan visual artist

- محمد شبعة
- Born: 1935; Tangier, Morocco
- Died: 2013 (aged 77–78)
- Other names: Mohamed Chabaa
- Education: School of Fine Arts of Tetuan, Accademia di Belle Arti di Roma
- Occupations: Visual artist, designer
- Known for: Painting
- Movement: Modernism
- Website: www.mohammedchabaa.com

Mohamed Chabâa (Arabic: محمد شبعة; 1935–2013) was a Moroccan visual artist. He was a member of the Casablanca School and a leader of contemporary art and modernism in the Global South. His multidisciplinary approach to art became emblematic of the cultural awakening that took place in Morocco in the period following the end of the French Protectorate.

== Biography ==
He was born in Tangier in 1935. He studied at the School of Fine Arts of Tetuan. From 1962 to 1964, he studied at the Accademia di Belle Arti di Roma. In 1966, he was hired as a professor at the School of Fine Arts of Casablanca and at the National School of Architecture in Rabat. He was against the classification of Moroccan art as "folklore" or naïve art, and published his ideas in the literary magazine Anfas. Along with his friends and colleagues Mohamed Melehi, Farid Belkahia, and others, Chabâa became involved in the modernist movement known as the Casablanca School.
