= Mohamed Hamidi =

Moroccan painter (1941–2025)

- محمد حميدي
- Born: 7 August 1941; Casablanca, Morocco
- Died: 6 October 2025 (aged 84)
- Education: School of Fine Arts of Casablanca; Beaux-Arts de Paris; ENSAAMA
- Occupation: Painter

Mohamed Hamidi (Arabic: محمد حميدي; 7 August 1941 – 6 October 2025) was a Moroccan painter.

Hamidi was notably a founding member of the Association marocaine des arts plastiques and held numerous exhibitions both in Morocco and abroad. He died on 6 October 2025, at the age of 84.
