= School of Fine Arts of Casablanca =

Fine arts school in Casablanca, Morocco

- المدرسة العليا للفنون الجميلة بالدار البيضاء l'Ecole des Beaux-Arts de Casablanca

Location
- 20 boulevard Rachidi, Casablanca; Morocco
- Coordinates: 33.5921°N 7.6233°W

The School of Fine Arts of Casablanca (Arabic: المدرسة العليا للفنون الجميلة بالدار البيضاء, French: l'Ecole des Beaux-Arts de Casablanca) is a Fine arts school established in 1919 in Casablanca, Morocco. It was the origin of the modernist Casablanca School art movement led by faculty members Farid Belkahia, Mohamed Melehi, and Mohamed Chabâa in the 1960s.

== History ==
The institution was founded in 1919 by a French Orientalist painter named Édouard Brindeau de Jarny, who started his career teaching drawing at Lycée Lyautey. Resident General Hubert Lyautey tasked Brindeau and Prosper Ricard with cataloguing Moroccan visual heritage to inform the guidelines for vocational schools and the reform of traditional industries. Brindeau convinced Resident General Lyautey and Georges Hardy, director of public education under the French Protectorate, to establish a school of fine arts in Casablanca's medina. In the beginning, mainly French students studied applied arts for the use in architecture, interior design, decoration, and architectural landscaping, in addition to drawing, painting, art history, and math. The school also hosted ateliers ouverts (open workshops) for European and Moroccan artists and craftsmen, as well as students and instructors from other institutions. Abdeslam Ben Larbi el Fassi, whom Italian art teacher Toni Maraini described as "the first Modern Moroccan artist," was one of the school's first students.

The school was overseen by the municipality chief, four members of the municipal council, and the director of Lycée Lyautey. They chose the rules, appointed the director, and required that all instructors hold French nationality. A small number of sons of Moroccan notables were admitted, and they were not allowed to participate in any exhibitions without their consent. The school promoted itself by advertising that graduates could become "art instructors, advertising designers, interior decorators, typesetters, and builders of maquettes." In his book Art in the Service of Colonialism, Hamid Irbouh writes that Moroccan students were trained to become "technicians to assist French architects." It oriented Moroccan students toward becoming master craftsmen, studying ceramics, architectural drafting, and interior decoration, while orienting French students toward Fine arts and to apply to Écoles des Beaux-Arts in France.

=== Casablanca Art School ===
Farid Belkahia became the director of the School of Fine Arts of Casablanca in 1962. From 1964 to 1972, the group of teachers, composed of Belkahia and faculty members Mohammed Melehi and Mohamed Chabâa, worked toward what Belkahia described as a "democratization" of the art curriculum. The curriculum incorporated the specific use of local traditional crafts by students, who worked with their instructors on projects. According to art critic Salah M. Hassan, the Casablanca Art School "saw itself as the artistic conscience of the time. It criticized the politics of dependency on foreign cultural missions, at that time the patrons of Moroccan modern art."

In 1969, the Casablanca Art School held an exposition manifeste entitled "Présence Plastique" in the Jemaa el-Fnaa of Marrakesh, displaying their work in public. In 1974, Farid Belkahia asked one of his first students, the artist Abderrahmane Rahoule, who had been a teacher since 1972 and a full member of the Casablanca Group, to take over as director of the Casablanca School of Fine Arts.

== Legacy ==
From February to May 2024, the ifa Gallery in Berlin presented an exhibition and accompanying art historical research titled "School of Casablanca" with the aim of highlighting the legacy of the historical Casablanca Art School for contemporary art discourse:

School of Casablanca highlights a pivotal moment in Moroccan art history that had wide-ranging implications for the entire region. A new civic awareness emerged that impacted both artists and intellectuals seeking to reconsider their social function and visibility in the public sphere. Through this process, the artist became the producer of a social and cultural project in which art was seen as a space of shared knowledge and experience.

— School of Casablanca project, Berlin 2024,

From May 2023 to January 2024, Tate St Ives art gallery in Cornwall, UK, and later the Sharjah Art Foundation in the United Arab Emirates (February–June 2024), showed an exhibition titled "The Casablanca Art School: Platforms and Patterns for a Postcolonial Avant-Garde (1962-1987)". The same exhibition was presented by the Schirn Kunsthalle in Frankfurt, Germany, between July and October 2024. This exhibition presented almost 100 works by 22 artists and documents from the historical period of the Casablanca Art School.

== Notable faculty ==
Notable faculty members of the School of Fine Arts of Casablanca:

- Farid Belkahia
- Mohamed Melehi
- Mohamed Chabâa
- Abderrahmane Rahoule

== Notable alumni ==
Notable alumni of the School of Fine Arts of Casablanca include:

- Abdelakabir Faradjallah of the band, Attarazat Addahabia
- Abderrahmane Rahoule
- Malika Agueznay
- Meryem Aboulouafa
- Ikram Kabbaj
- Majida Khattari (diploma in 1988)
- Mounir fatmi
- Mohammed Arrhioui
- Rebel Spirit
- Fatiha Zemmouri
