= Ifa Gallery =

- Established: 2006
- Location: Rue Saint-Georges 24 / Sint-Jorisstraat 24, Brussels; 733 Wanhangdu Road, Shanghai
- Type: contemporary art
- Director: Alexis Kouzmine-Karavaïeff
- Website: ifa-gallery.com

The Ifa Gallery /ɪˈfɑː/ (Chinese: 艺法画廊; pinyin: Yìfǎ Huàláng) is a contemporary art gallery in Shanghai, China and Brussels, Belgium. The name Ifa comes from Chinese 艺 (yì) (Chinese: 藝) and 法 (fǎ), meaning methods of art.

Established in 2006 and directed by Alexis Kouzmine-Karavaïeff, the Ifa Gallery explores perspectives on contemporary art in China and beyond.

== History ==
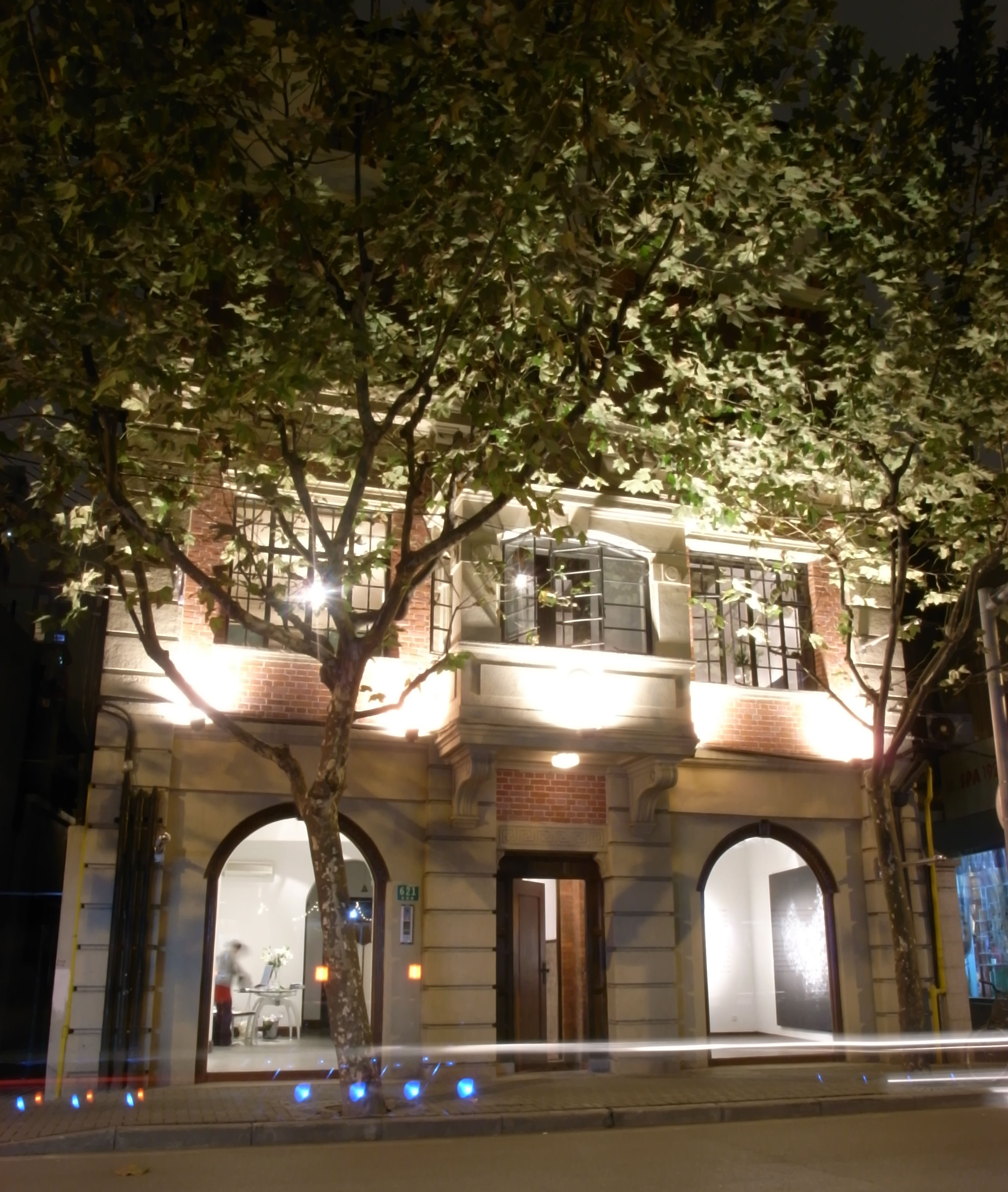
ifa gallery at night.

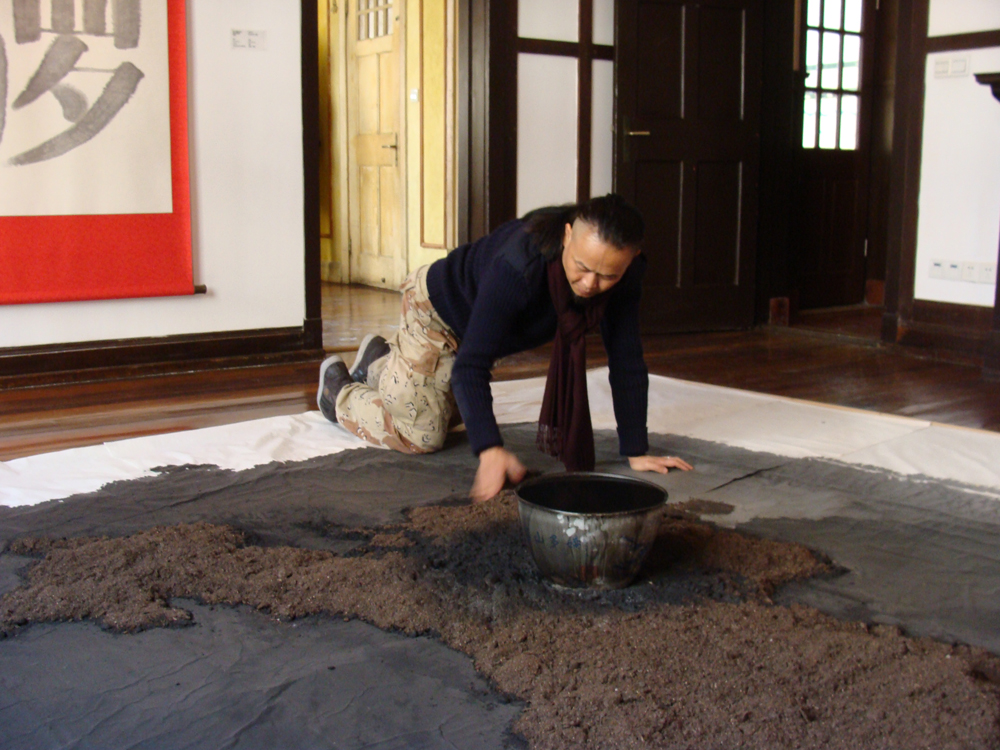
Dai Guangyu dismantling his installation "Borderline"

The gallery initially opened in M50 (short for 50 Moganshan Road), the site of a former textile mill that is now a well-known Shanghai art district. Formerly Xinhe Cotton Mill, later renamed Shanghai Chunming Roving Factory, this area began attracting artists and galleries in 1999. There, the gallery was located in a renovated warehouse space of around 700m² designed by French architect Philippe Diani.

In August 2008, the gallery moved to the former British concession near Jing'an Temple to a 1920s British colonial villa on Changde Road. Its exhibition space spreads across four levels of the building. At the end of 2013 it opened a new gallery space in Brussels, in the historical district of Marolles.

The Ifa Gallery opened a temporary space called "ifa²gallery" (August 2010 – February 2011) located on Yonkang Lu Art (a platform for contemporary art on Yongkang Road, developed by the artist-curator Zane Mellupe, in the former French Concession of Shanghai).

== Artists and exhibitions ==
The Ifa Gallery opened the Changde Road gallery with two exhibitions curated by Bérénice Angremy and Marie Terrieux. The first was Some Space for Humanity, a solo exhibition of photographic works of the Gao Brothers (Chinese: 高氏兄弟; pinyin: Gaōshì Xiōngdì) that reiterated the artists‘ focus on humanity and the built environment by playing on the physical confines of the gallery space. This opening exhibition coincided with Shanghai Art Fair 2008 and the 7th Shanghai Biennale. In late 2008/early 2009, Ink Games, the solo show of Dai Guangyu, was seen to be "one of the foremost events of the winter season in the sphere of contemporary fine art in Shanghai".

The gallery also exhibits younger, emerging artists, such as intermedia artist Wu Junyong, painter Fan Jiupeng and Audrey Salmon, a Beijing-based photographer and designer.

Ifa is also attempting to bring attention to artists from other parts of Asia, with exhibitions such as "A Snapshot of Contemporary Vietnamese Art", which placed "much needed emphasis on a genre which remains relatively unexplored in the art world".
