= Farid Belkahia =

Moroccan painter (1934–2014)

- فريد بلكاهية
- Born: 1934, November 15; Marrakesh, Morocco
- Died: 2014, September 25
- Education: Ecole des Beaux-Arts, 1954-1959 Prague Theater Institute, 1959-1962 Brera Academy, 1965-1966
- Known for: Casablanca School

Farid Belkahia (Arabic: فريد بلكاهية; 1934 - 2014) was a Moroccan modernist artist and education reformer. He served as the director of the School of Fine Arts of Casablanca from 1962 to 1974, during the period of the Casablanca school modernist movement. As an artist, he worked primarily in painting, metalwork and leatherwork.

== Early life ==
He was born to a wealthy family in Marrakesh. His father's circle of friends included the Polish artist Olek Teslar and the French artist Jeannine Guillou. Through Guillou, Farid Belkahia met Nicolas de Staël in 1937.

== Education and career ==
Belkahia studied at the École des Beaux-Arts of Paris 1954 to 1959. He continued his studies in Prague at the Prague Theater Institute from 1959 to 1962 and thereafter furthered his studies at the Brera Academy in Milan until 1966. In 1962 he was appointed as Director of the Casablanca School of Fine Arts and served until 1974.

== Artistic practice ==
While he was influenced by the aesthetics of Western minimalism and modernism, he was also inspired by the visual cultures of Moroccan heritage & indigenous Amazigh culture, incorporating related shapes, symbols & patterns into his work. Beginning his practice in the realm of expressionism, Farid expanded his work to incorporate multi-media with a focus on traditional materials & natural pigments prevalent in Moroccan culture, such as henna & pomegranate bark.

== Exhibitions ==
Farid Belkahia: Symbols & Forms, Selma Feriani Gallery, Tunis 15 Dec. 2024 - 15 Feb. 2025

Prints & Printmaking, Dalloul Art Foundation, 05 Sept. 2024 - 12 Feb. 2025

Arab Presences: Modern Art & Decolonisation: Paris 1908-1988, Musée d'Art Moderne de Paris, 05 April 2024 - 25 Aug. 2024

The Casablanca Art School, Tate St. Ives, 27 May 2023 - 14 Jan. 2024

Taking Shape: Abstraction from the Arab World, 1950s - 1980s, The Block Museum, 20 Sept. 2022 - 04 Dec. 2022

Mini Mighty, Fann A Porter, Dubai, 11 May 2022 - 30 June 2022

Art, a serious game, MACAAL, Museum of African Contemporary Art Al Maaden, 21 Nov. 2021 - 17 July 2022

Farid Belkahia: The Cosmogonic artist, Selma Feriani Gallery, Tunis, 30 Sept. 2021 - 30 Dec. 2021

Farid Belkahia, Centre Pompidou Paris, 10 Feb. 2021 - 19 July 2021

Revolution Generations, Mathaf, Arab Museum of Modern Art, 17 Oct. 2018 - 16 Feb. 2019

Esoteric Writings, MACAAL, Museum of African Contemporary Art Al Maaden, 27 Sept. 2018 - 06 Jan. 2019

Mathaf Collection, Summary, Part 2, Mathaf, Arab Museum of Modern Art, 10 Sept. 2018 - 10 Feb. 2019

Second Life, MACAAL, Museum of African Contemporary Art Al Maaden, 27 Feb. 2018 - 05 Feb. 2019

Around the World Through Tondos, Galerie Claude Lemand, 29 June, 2017 - 30 Dec. 2017

Around the World Through Tondos, Galerie Claude Lemand, 02 June 2017 - 30 Dec. 2017

Focus: Works from Mathaf Collection, Vol 2, Mathaf, Arab Museum of Modern Art, 10 Mar. 2016 - 04 Sept. 2016

Modern Arab Masterpieces, Galerie Claude Lemand, 04 Nov. 2015 - 31 Dec. 2015

Focus: Works from Mathaf Collection, Mathaf, Arab Museum of Modern Art, 11 Oct. 2015 - 14 Feb. 2016

Paintings, Sculptures & Projects Garden, Mathaf, Arab Museum of Modern Art, 10 Dec. 2013 - 09 Feb. 2014

Interventions, Mathaf, Arab Museum of Modern Art, 30 Dec. 2010 - 13 Feb. 2011
