= Jewellery of the Berber cultures =

Traditional jewellery of Berber peoples in North Africa

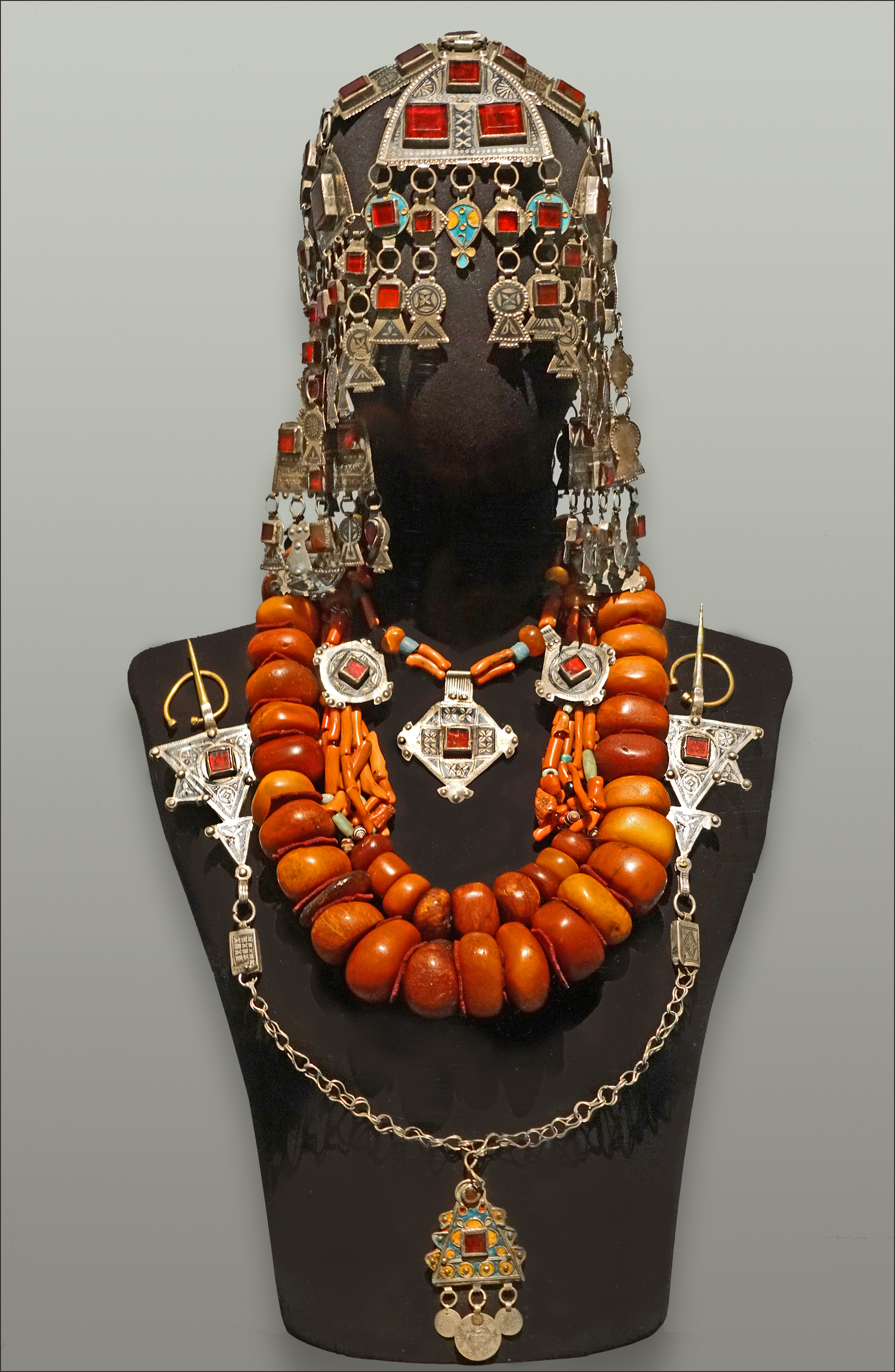
Jewellery of a Moroccan Berber woman from Anti-Atlas in the Musée du quai Branly, Paris

Jewellery of the Berber cultures (Tamazight language: iqqchochn imazighn, ⵉⵇⵇⵛⵓⵛⵏ ⵉⵎⴰⵣⵉⵖⵏ) is a historical style of traditional jewellery that was worn by women mainly in rural areas of the Maghreb region in North Africa and inhabited by Indigenous Berber people (in the Berber language Tamazight: Amazigh (sg.), Imazighen, pl). Following long social and cultural traditions, Berber or other silversmiths in Morocco, Algeria and neighbouring countries created intricate jewellery with distinct regional variations. In many towns and cities, there were Jewish silversmiths, who produced both jewellery in specific Berber styles as well as in other styles, adapting to changing techniques and artistic innovations.

Handing their jewellery on from generation to generation, as a visual element of the Berber ethnic identity, women maintained this characteristic cultural tradition as part of their gender-specific adornments. Berber communities exist in Morocco, Algeria, Tunisia and other locations, such as Libya. The numbers and varieties of their ethnic jewellery correspond to demographic patterns.

Berber jewellery was usually made of silver and included elaborate triangular plates and pins, originally used as clasps for garments, necklaces, bracelets, earrings and similar items. During the second part of the 20th century, the tradition of Berber jewellery was gradually abandoned in favour of different styles of jewellery made of gold. Just as other items of traditional rural life like carpets, costumes or ceramics, Berber jewellery has entered private and public collections of North African artefacts. Contemporary variations of these types of jewellery like the symbol of a hand (Arabic: hamsa or in Maghrebi Arabic khmissa) are sold today as commercial fashion products.

== History ==
In their documented history going as far back to prehistoric times, the different indigenous Berber peoples of North Africa, ranging from the Siwa Oasis in Egypt to Morocco and Mauritania, and historically including the Guanches of the Canary Islands, have undergone constant changes in lifestyles and culture. Most notably, the Arab conquest brought about important changes from the late 7th century onwards. Over time, the different Berber groups of the vast area that is North Africa adapted to external influences and their cultures, living partially as rural, but also as urban populations. Especially in larger cities and towns, such as Marrakesh or Meknes, Berbers mixed with people of other ethnic backgrounds, gradually bringing forth an urban, Islamized and partially Arabized society, which led to a gradual change of traditional Berber culture.

=== Rural Berber cultures ===
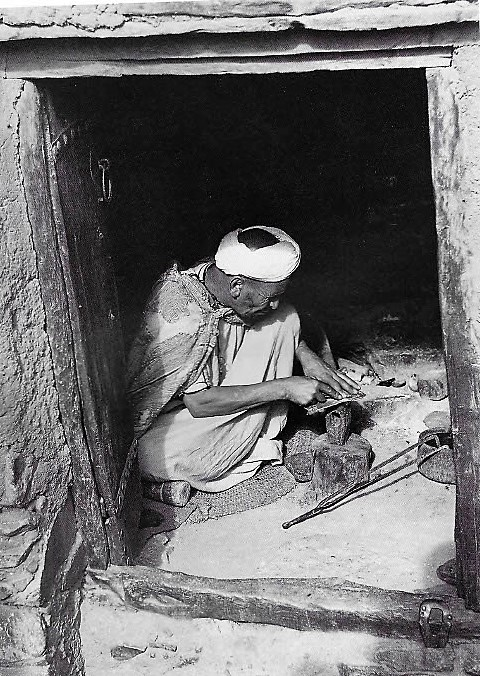
Silversmith in his workshop in Tiznit, Morocco

In rural areas, Berbers were traditionally farmers, living in mountains, plains or an oasis, such as the Siwa oasis in Egypt; but others, like the Tuareg and Zenata of the southern Sahara, were almost wholly nomadic. Some groups, such as the Chaouis, practised a semi-nomadic life (transhumance) and, during some months of the year, roamed the country with their herds of livestock (donkeys, sheep, goats, and camels in some areas) in search of fertile pastures.

While sedentary life had flourished since prehistorical times, survival in the drier regions, and especially in the High Atlas and Anti-Atlas mountains, was only possible if people moved with their cattle to the higher mountain regions, where grass, herbs and above all water were still available in sufficient quantity. As they did not return to their villages until late autumn, their winter harvests were stored in a fortified communal granary, called agadir, and protected against other nomads and hostile neighbouring villages by guards, who stayed there at all times. This regime was also followed in the Aures region of Algeria, where local clans stored grains in fortified granaries. In villages and small towns of Morocco, people often lived in traditional buildings called ksour (pl.). In most settlements, blacksmiths and silversmiths operated small, family-run workshops. Based on their skills of handling the four elements: fire, air, water and metals, originally taken from the earth, these professions were often not highly regarded, which was partly due to superstitious beliefs attributed to these skills.

=== Berber jewellery in Morocco, Algeria and Tunisia ===
Jewellery is easy to transport, and the women could take it along on the annual migrations. In a traditional world that functioned completely or largely without money, jewellery also played a role as a means of savings for emergencies. Thus, official coins were often used to adorn headgear, necklaces, etc. When necessary, they could be broken off and sold, but their value only consisted of pure material value.

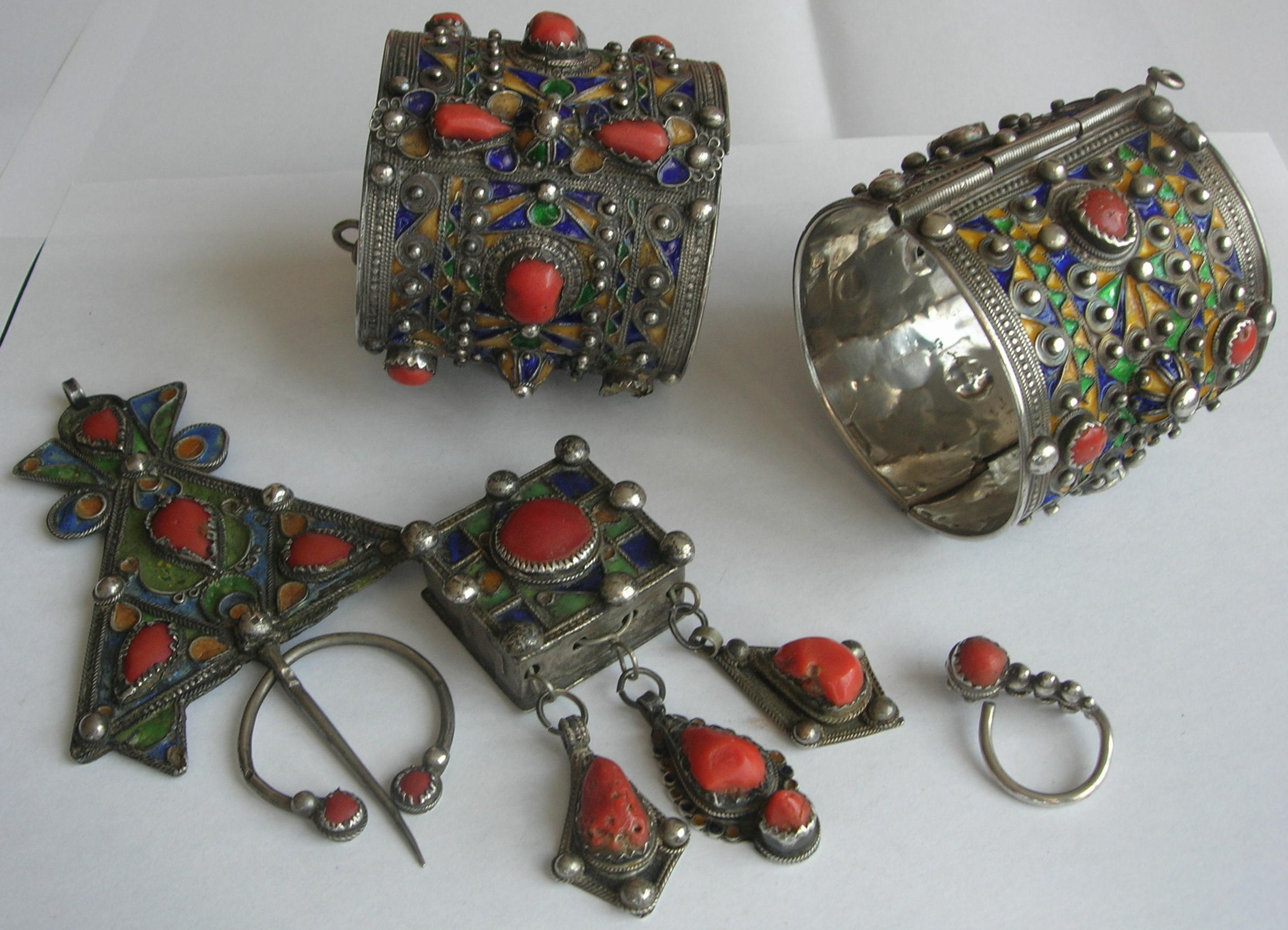
Berber jewellery from the Kabylia region, Algeria

While the Arabized and urban inhabitants of North Africa preferred jewellery made of gold, the rural Berbers held on to silver jewellery for centuries. This provided the economic basis for the silversmiths in medium-sized towns, such as Tiznit or Sefrou in Morocco or in the Kabylia mountains in Algeria, which were often run by Jewish silversmiths. Whether the preference for silver happened solely for social, economic or reasons attributed to folklore, such as the belief that these pieces bestow a protective effect (baraka), or for other reasons, can no longer be determined.

In Algeria, important centres of jewellery production and usage were the villages of the Beni Yenni district and the town of Ouadhiya in the Great Kabylia mountains east of Algiers. In the north-eastern mountain region of the Aurès, the Chaoui Berbers used silver jewellery, typically made with enamel applications and corals. In southern Tunisia, the island of Djerba was a traditional centre of jewellery production, whereby figurative motifs (plants, fish, birds), and sometimes gold instead of silver were used in contrast to the traditions in Morocco and Algeria.

=== Tuareg and Mauritanian jewellery ===
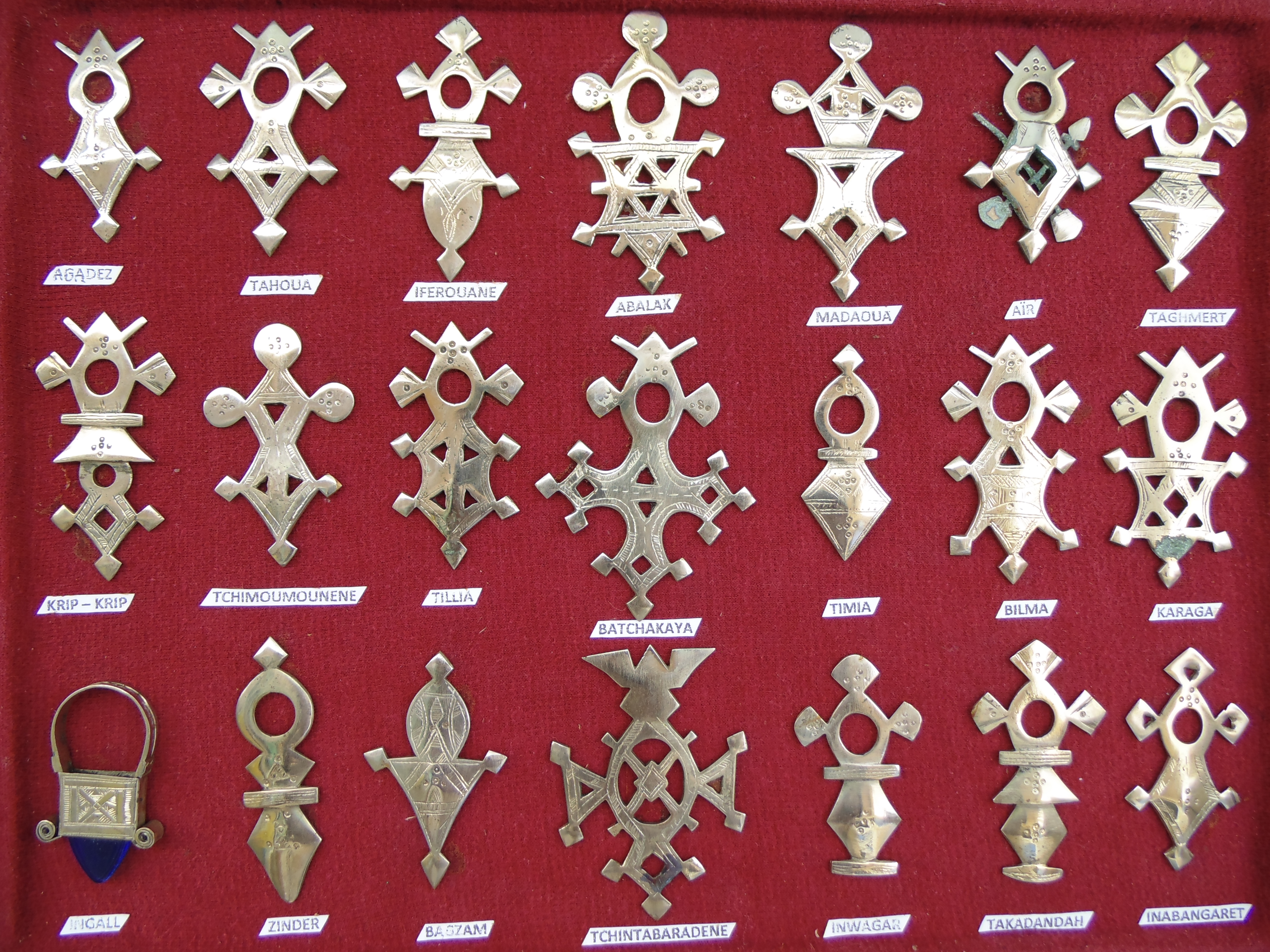
The Cross of Agadez in 21 modern variations, Niger, 2019

Jewellery made of silver, coloured glass or iron is also a special tradition of the Tuareg people. They belong to the Berber peoples and mostly still live as semi-nomads in parts of the Sahara in the Hoggar region of modern-day Algeria, Libya, Niger, Mali and Burkina Faso. Their jewellery is remarkable for the so-called Cross of Agadez, even though only a few of these pieces resemble a cross. Most are worn as pendants with varied shapes that either resemble a cross or have the shape of a plate or shield. Historically, the oldest known specimens were made of stone or copper, but subsequently, the Tuareg blacksmiths also used iron and silver made in the lost-wax casting technique. According to the article "The cross of Agadez", this piece has become a national and African symbol for Tuareg culture and political rights. Today, these pieces of jewellery are often made for tourists or as items of ethnic-style fashion for customers in other countries, with certain modern changes.

Tuareg jewellery has been compared to similar styles of southwestern Morocco, the western parts of the Sahara and Mauritania, like the Cross of Trarza, traditionally produced by Berber people, who speak Hassaniya Arabic and are sometimes referred to as Moors or Beidane. According to studies of Tuareg and Mauritanian jewellery, the latter are usually more embellished and may carry typical pyramidal elements. Specimens of their jewellery, including heavy silver anklets, were published in the book Berber women of Morocco.

== Methods, forms and society ==
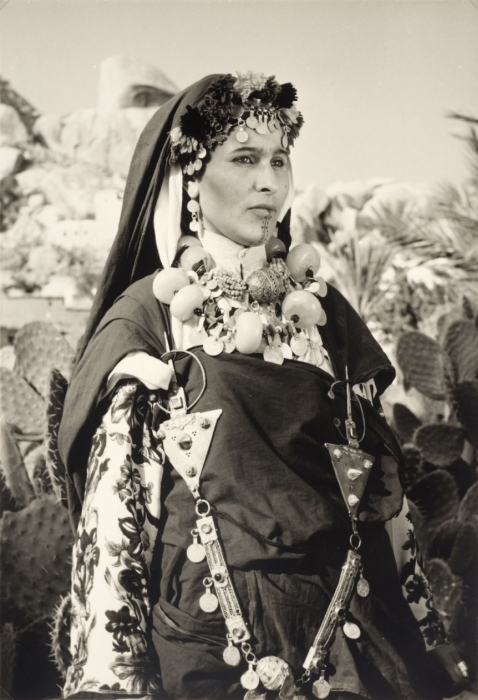
Berber jewellery, near Tafraoute, Morocco, c. 1950. The necklace is supported by an Amazigh brooch at each side.

Traditional Berber jewellery consists mainly of silver, cast in a mould and afterwards finished by hand. Depending on the region as well as the type of jewellery, enamelling, corals, beads of Amber and coloured glass or rarely semi-precious stones were applied. According to art historians, the art of enamelling using the cloisonné technique was introduced by Sephardi Jewish goldsmiths, who in turn had inherited this skill from their forefathers in Moorish Al-Andalus. Another method used in the Maghreb is called filigrané, as thin silver filigree wire was used for intricate, mesh-like designs, to mark the boundaries of inserted beads or the areas for each colour of enamelled space in the typical shades of yellow, green and blue, before the melted glass powder was applied. Enamelled Berber jewellery was produced in Algeria (Great Kabylia), in Morocco (Tiznit and Anti-Atlas) as well as in Tunisia (Moknine and the island of Djerba). Visible parts of the pieces that were not covered by enamelling or filigrané technique were mostly covered by engraved or chiselled designs hammered into the silver and often also made more visible by applying the niello technique.

In addition to ornamental bracelets, anklets, pendants, rings and chains for necklaces or headgear, characteristic fibula or penannular brooches, composed of a symmetrical pair of triangular plates with pins, called tizerzaï, were used virtually with the pins perforating the women's unsown outer garments and pointing straight up to keep draped garments in place. In some cases, these Amazigh brooches were rather large and heavy, as they had to hold up long pieces of textile, made of cotton or wool, and loosely draped around the body. A chain or beaded necklace often was attached to the two brooches, fixed to a ring at the bottom of the brooches. As brooches in similar form and function are known from the Bronze Age and later Roman and Visigoth brooches, such fibulae are believed to have been in use in the Maghreb since ancient times.

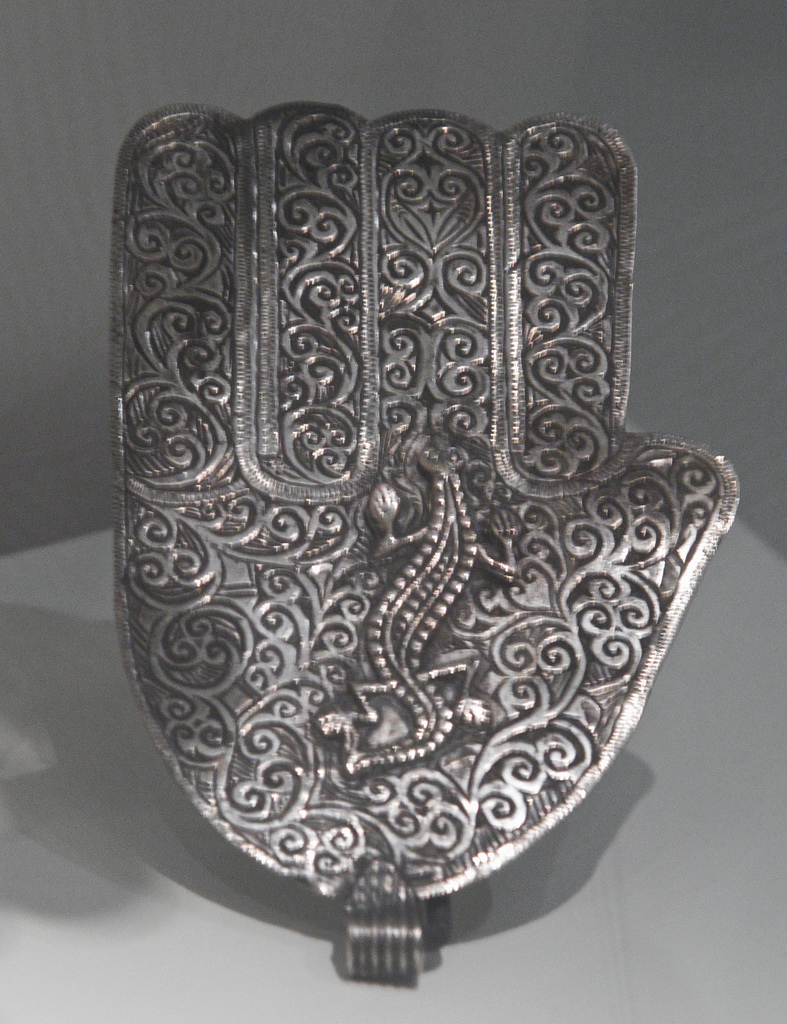
Khmisa amulet with the shape of a salamander

Typical basic forms of jewellery are triangles and almond shapes, as well as the so-called khmissa (local pronunciation of the Arabic word khamsa for the number five), which is called as in the Berber language (Tamazight). This form represents the five fingers of the hand and is traditionally believed both by Muslims as well as Jewish people to protect against the Evil Eye. Apart from these, geometrical, floral, animal and "cosmic" forms such as solar discs or crescents were used according to regional traditions. The geometric shapes of jewellery can also be found in the ornaments of Berber mud-brick or stone buildings and on their traditional clothes and carpets. The tattoos of Berber women and their henna ornaments applied on special occasions as well as some images of regional rock art also show similar forms.

In the southern parts of Morocco, especially in today's regions of Drâa-Tafilalet and Sous with the important marketplace Tiznit, Jewish Berbers, who had lived there since at least the second century BCE until their emigration in the late 1950s, were renowned silversmiths for their Berber jewellery. Since the khmisa, as the "Hand of Miriam" also has a protective reputation against bad luck for Jews, such pieces were also made with a Star of David.

Pieces of jewellery were valued objects and worn for important celebrations, such as weddings, and religious and social gatherings like country fairs (moussem). They constituted the most important part of a husband's wedding gifts and a woman's dowry, which remained her personal property even in case of a divorce, and were passed on from one generation to the next. Due to changes in generations, taste and wealth, they were often changed and reworked. Therefore, the age of many pieces is difficult to date, and one has to assume that most of them were only made in the late 19th and early 20th centuries. Just as other elements of a person's appearance, jewellery was not only worn for aesthetic purposes, but also carried information about the social situation of women, including messages about marital status, wealth and social hierarchy.

== Modern changes ==
In the second half of the 20th century, the traditional lifestyles of the rural Berbers underwent important changes. Notwithstanding the constant modernization in the rural regions of the Maghreb, migration from the countryside to the cities and other countries has been increasing steadily. Berber jewellery thus lost its original meaning, and demand as well as traditional production came to a standstill. Art historian Cynthia Becker reports from her field studies in rural areas of southern Morocco during the 1990s that merely few Berber women still wore silver jewellery daily, and that traditional dress and jewellery were only worn during wedding ceremonies, where these traditions have played an important role before.

According to most authors, however, contemporary Berber women have abandoned the use of traditional jewellery in favour of modern urban styles made of gold. Many pieces were sold to individual buyers travelling the area, and these in turn sold it on to the increasing number of antique and tourist shops in the cities. Today, most customers are tourists or collectors from abroad, while in contemporary art, Berber jewellery is used to "express a nostalgic and idealized vision of the past".

In the early 2000s, Moroccan visual artist Amina Agueznay used historical silver pieces of the Berber tradition with her own additions to create her contemporary jewellery, such as a silver pendant and necklace with a traditional engraving on one side and a modern application on the other.

== Museum collections and exhibitions ==
As part of material cultural heritage, historical Berber jewellery has been collected by ethnographic museums in the Maghreb, such as the Dar Si Said museum in Marrakesh, the Musée du Patrimoine Amazigh in Agadir or the Bardo National Museum in Algiers. Museums in other countries, such as the Musée du quai Branly in Paris, the Tropenmuseum in Amsterdam or the Metropolitan Museum of Art and Brooklyn Museum in New York City, also present such pieces and other traditional cultural objects of the Berber people.

In 2008, the Museum for African Art in New York opened an exhibition of Moroccan jewelry and art from the private Xavier Guerrand-Hermès collection. From December 2004 to August 2006, the Peabody Museum of Archeology and Ethnology at Harvard University presented the exhibition Imazighen! Beauty and Artisanship in Berber Life with an accompanying catalogue on traditional artifacts, including jewellery, from the Berber regions Kabylia in north-eastern Algeria, the Rif mountains of north-eastern Morocco and the Tuareg regions of the Algerian Sahara.

The exhibition Splendeurs du Maroc at the Royal Museum for Central Africa in Belgium in 1998/99 presented a large variety of Moroccan jewelry from the museum's as well as private collections, described in the accompanying book of the same name.

Art historian Björn Dahlström, a former director of the Berber Art Museum in Marrakesh, edited the volume Berber Women of Morocco, which was published in conjunction with the 2014/15 exhibition of the same name and shown in Paris, Manama and Rabat. From February 2016 to January 2017, the Institut du Monde arabe in Paris exhibited more than 250 pieces of mainly Berber jewelry from Morocco, Algeria, and Tunisia from a private collection, titled Des trésors à porter. Bijoux et parures du Maghreb [Treasures to wear. Jewellery and ornaments of the Maghreb]. The accompanying book includes images and information about the materials, techniques, and regional origin of the different styles and pieces.

Opened in January 2023, the National Jewellery Museum in Rabat presents a large and varied collection of Berber jewelry, alongside other Moroccan jewelry and personal adornment.

Selected pieces in museum collections

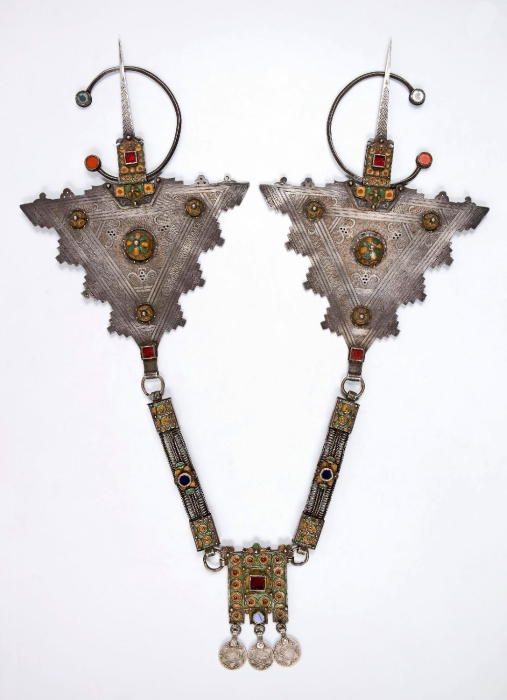
Pair of triangular fibulae with chain and pendant from southern Morocco, Tropenmuseum Amsterdam

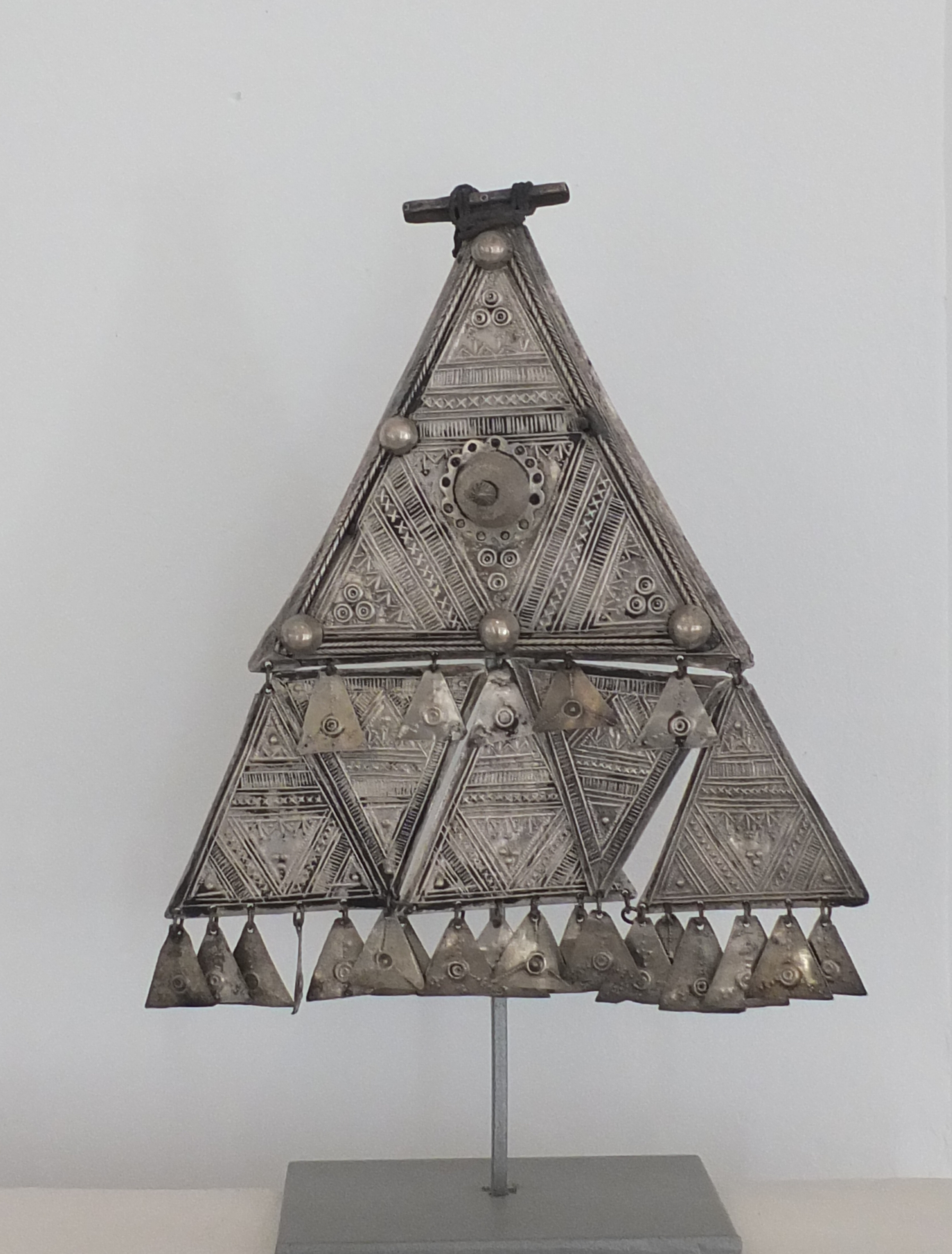
Tuareg pendant from Hoggar, Algeria, Musée Lalla Hadria, Djerba, Tunisia, photo: Ad Meskens

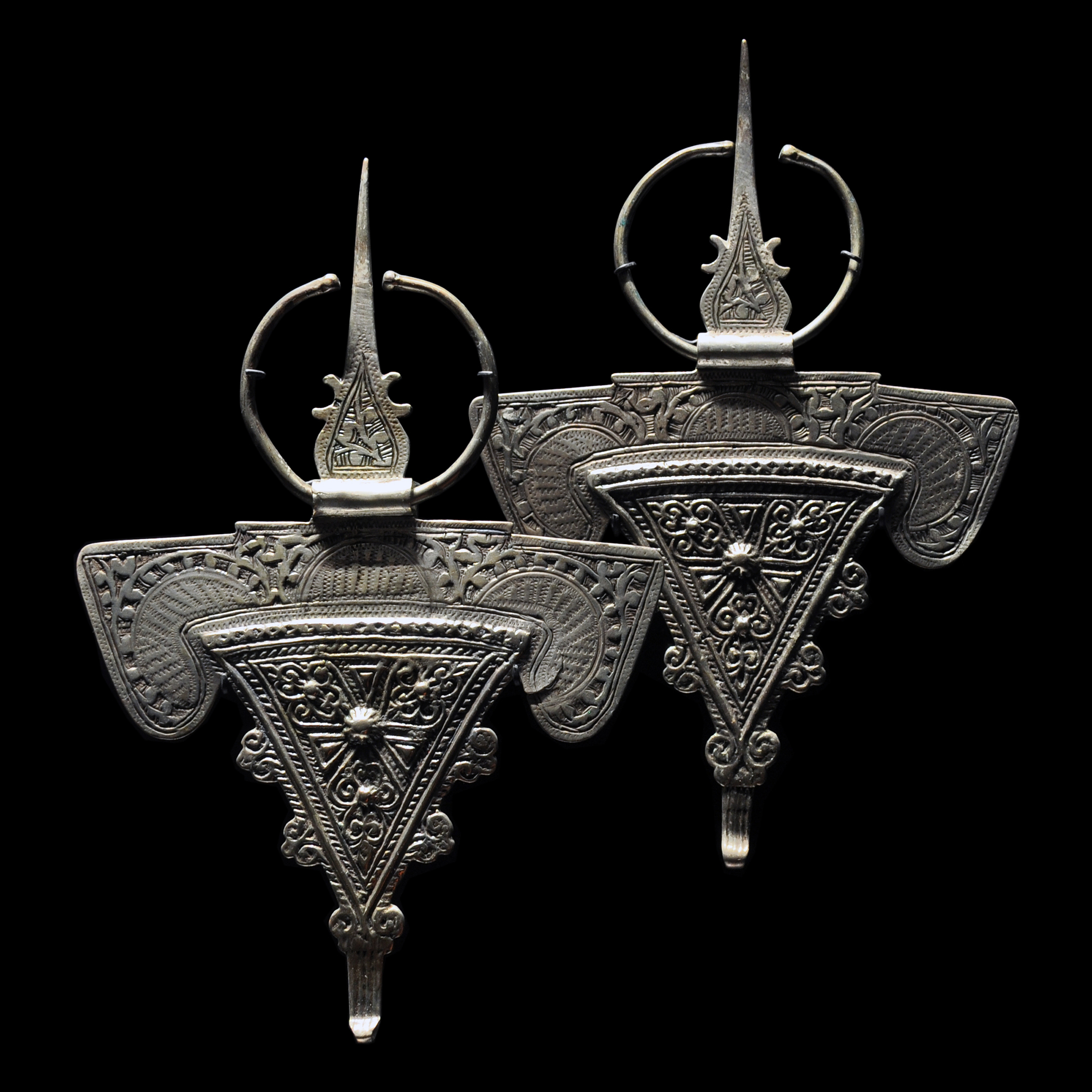
Fibula brooches of the bélier style, resembling a ram's head, in the Musée du quai Branly, Paris

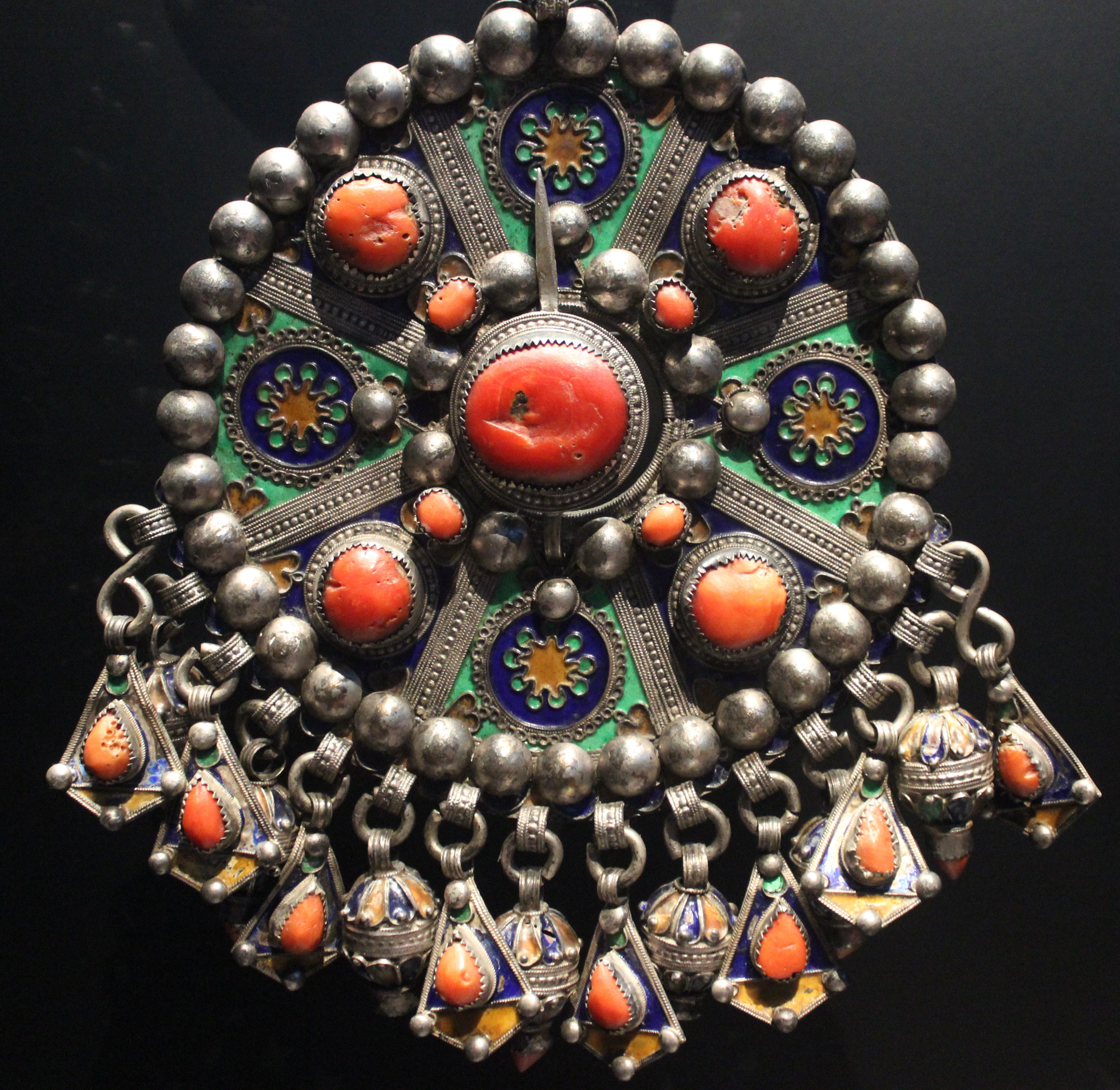
Fibula from Algeria, Musée du quai Branly, Paris

== Scholarship ==
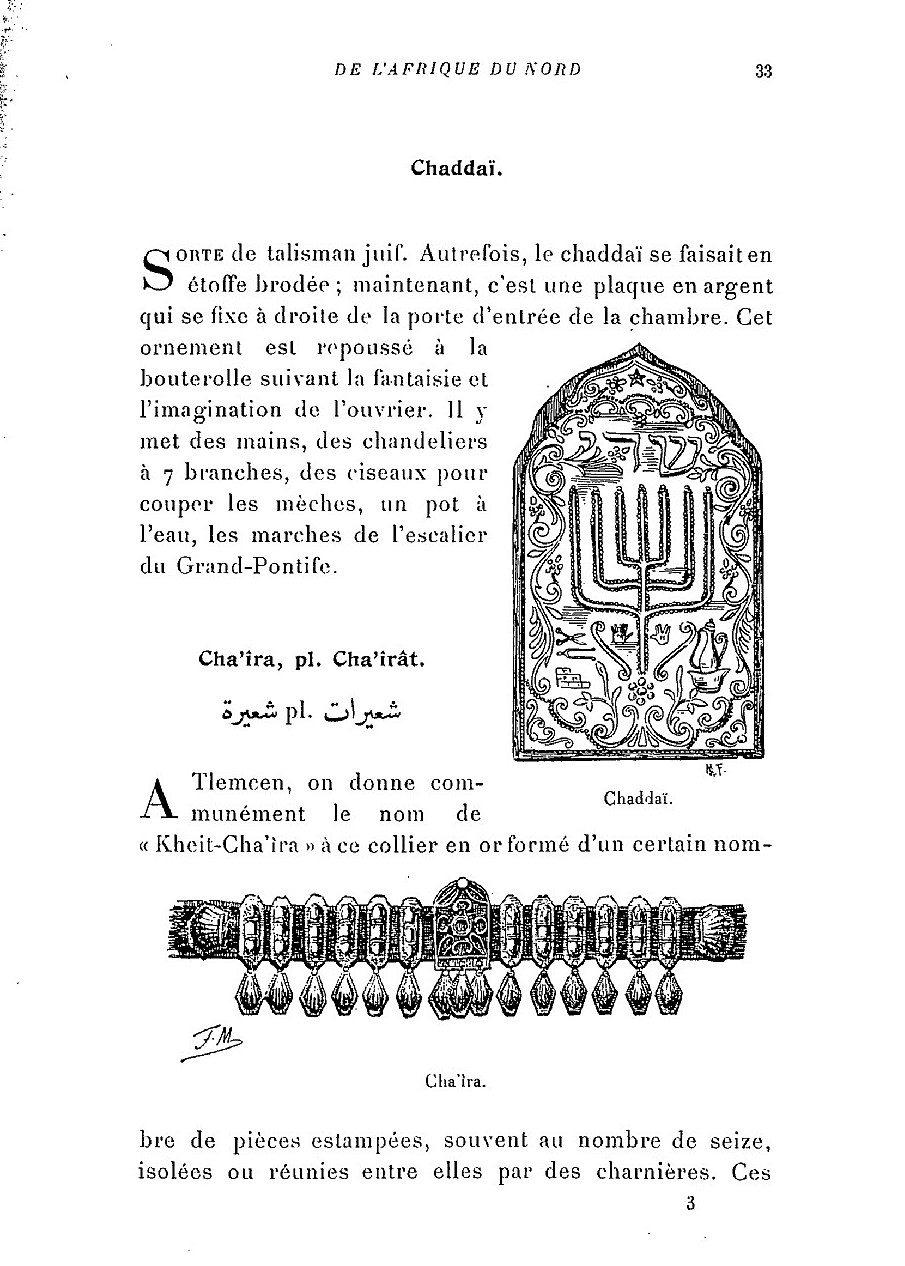
Description of a Jewish talisman and Algerian headdress, from Paul Eudel, Dictionnaire des bijoux de l’Afrique du Nord (1906)

Ethnographic studies in the Maghreb started with French colonial officials and social scientists and included descriptions of the Berber cultures, mostly about their traditional architecture, textiles and ceramics, as well as to important social events like marriages, local festivals (mousses) and Indigenous forms of economic life.

During the second part of the 20th century, French ethnologists published academic papers and books for the wider public. These mainly focused on the classification of Berber jewellery in terms of category as brooches, earrings, bracelets etc., of materials, forms and local names of the different pieces and on the historical, geographical and ethnic origins of the silversmiths and their customers. Since the beginning of the 21st century, art historians have widened their focus of investigation on further aspects of this cultural tradition, such as the social and gender-specific roles of Berber women and the changing importance of jewellery and other forms of Berber artistic production in the contemporary world.

=== Early ethnographic descriptions ===
The French collector and art critic Paul Eudel (in French) (1837–1911) was one of the first authors of art historical descriptions of jewellery in the Maghreb. After his first account of jewellery in Algeria and Tunisia L'orfévrerie algérienne et tunisienne (1902), he published a thematic dictionary with an even wider geographical scope, titled Dictionnaire des bijoux de l’Afrique du Nord. Maroc, Algérie, Tunisie, Tripolitaine (1906). Based on his travels to these countries, he compiled detailed information about Berber and other styles of jewellery with graphic illustrations for his notes.

Jean Besancenot (1902–1992), a French painter, self-trained ethnographer and documentary photographer, produced detailed descriptions as well as numerous photographs and artistic illustrations of traditional costumes and other forms of personal adornment in Morocco. Commissioned by the administration of the French protectorate, he had collected these ethnographic records during his extensive travels in the country between 1934 and 1939.

For his illustrated book Costumes du Maroc (1942), he identified three basic categories of costumes: rural Berber dress, Jewish dress and urban citizens' costumes, some of which with Arab elements of dress. Further, each of the portraits of his 60 gouache paintings was attributed to a specific social role (married woman, palace guard, musician etc.), city or region, and Berber dress also assigned to corresponding tribal groups. As these forms of dress were still very much alive and differentiated in the 1930s, Besancenot remarked that in rural areas, each type of dress represented a tribal identity. As his artistic colour portraits of persons in full length did not allow sufficient space for elements like hairstyles, shoes or how to drape loose pieces of textiles, such as the urban haik and Berber draped garments, he added explanations and drawings of these pieces of personal appearance. To represent jewellery in detail, he added descriptions and drawings of 56 pieces of urban as well as 38 rural Berber styles. In his second work, Bijoux arabes et berbères du Maroc (1953), he published his drawings and descriptions of almost 200 pieces of jewellery from different places and traditions in Morocco. Besancenot was originally a painter, and his drawings highlight the intricate features of the pieces in reduced detail compared to his corresponding photographs.

In the course of his field visits, he learned to use photography as a means of quickly capturing his ethnographic impressions. In an interview with the journalist Dominique Carré, he commented on his approach: "I wanted to prove that scientists very often pursue their investigations in a frame of mind that partially leaves aside the aesthetic aspect. [...] They thoroughly study many things but often neglect the aspects of traditional arts that contain a significant aesthetic value. I wanted to restore this value."

=== Studies by ethnologists ===
Henriette Camps-Fabrer (1928–2015), a French ethnologist who specialized in North African culture, wrote several books about the Berber jewellery of Algeria and the neighbouring Maghreb countries between the 1970s and 1990. She and her husband, Gabriel Camps (1927–2002) had grown up in colonial Algeria and published research on the history of the Berber people. After the independence of Algeria in 1962, they taught archaeology and cultural anthropology at the University of Algiers and were associated with the Bardo National Museum. Gabriel Camps was also the founder and first editor-in-chief of the Encyclopédie Berbère, where entries about Berber jewellery, its history, production and typology by Camps-Fabrer were published.

The French ethnologist Marie-Rose Rabaté is the (co-)author of several books and articles since the late 1970s about popular traditions in Morocco, focussing on costumes, jewellery and other decorative arts. Commenting on the disappearing use of Berber jewellery since the 1960s, she deemed it "urgent, at the end of the [20th] century, to identify these ornaments, to locate them as exactly as possible, to give them their rightful place in the history of Moroccan traditions."

In his 1989 book Bijoux berbères au Maroc dans la tradition judéo-arabe, that focussed on the Jewish tradition in Morocco, the ethnologist David Rouach gave detailed information about how to ascertain the production date of some of the silver pieces, the forms and techniques used and especially about their symbols and designs.

=== Studies by art historians ===
The 2021 book Berber Memories: Women and Jewellery in Morocco presents chapters by Belgian art historian Michel Draguet on the history of the Berbers, as well as on gender-specific cultural traditions of Berber women. Jewellery is set in the context of daily life, where women had a specific social status reflected by their handicrafts, oral poetry and fashion, including jewellery. Drawing on a private collection of about 300 pieces, this volume of almost 600 pages also presents numerous photographs of Berber jewellery from different regions in Morocco.

According to the article Deconstructing the history of Berber arts: tribalism, matriarchy and a primitive Neolithic past (2010) by Boston University's African art historian Cynthia Becker, the contemporary understanding of the history of Berber artistic traditions remains cursory and superficial. While postcolonial scholarship has critically exposed the stereotypes and Eurocentric approach of earlier studies, she posits that this historical approach has been insufficient to understand the complex realities of North African people's lives. In particular, she claims that the influence of Islam, Arab culture, trade and migration have largely been overlooked. Further, she challenged the notion of "urban Arab" artistic production as opposed to "rural Berber" artefacts and quoted art historian Sidney L. Kasfir's article One tribe, one style?, which states that "pre-colonial cultures were mutually dependent, interacted frequently, and shared many of their artistic traditions across ethnic boundaries." Criticizing the notion of "ancient" Berber traditions that denies historical change, Becker argues: "Such claims romanticize and de-historicize rural Berbers, reinforcing the idea that authentic Berber arts are those that remained untouched throughout the centuries." Referring to interpretations of Berber motifs as archetypal forms with protective features that have been traced to pre-Islamic times by colonial-era ethnologists such as Gabriel Camps, Becker further cautions that the notion of an "unconscious, millennia-old "Berberness" fails "to consider subtle social encounters and negotiations that influence artistic production."

Commenting on the central and gender-specific roles of women as producers of clothing and textiles and as beneficiaries of costumes and jewellery, Becker wrote in her 2006 study, Amazigh Arts in Morocco. Women Shaping Berber Identity,: "Women both created the artistic symbols of Berber identity and wore them on their bodies, making the decorated female body a public symbol of Berber identity." In she concludes that in contrast to North Africans of Arab culture, Berber women "are the primary producers of art, and women's arts identify the group as Berber."

French ethnologist Marie-Luce Gélard discusses jewellery in the context of collective marriage rituals of the Aït Khabbash tribe in southeastern Morocco and emphasizes both the gender-specific nature of such objects as well as the complementarity of gender-related cultural practices as follows:

Jewellery has a gender, of course [...], by their social and ritual use, these pieces of jewellery go beyond the sole manifestation of the feminine sphere. If they represent the wife, they are also the expression of the meeting, the union and the complementarity of the genders. [...] We are far from the normative visions of totally disjointing masculine and feminine universes; the ritual use and display of objects testifies to a unity of the genders.

— Marie-Luce Gélard, Le rôle des objets dans les rituels de mariage collectifs (Sahara, Maroc)

Other contemporary aspects of ethnographic studies and the presentation of Berber and other North African material culture in museums relate to questions, how the complex social history and cultural production of Berber or Arabic-speaking people may be understood. In the context of post-colonial studies, authors such as Cynthia Becker and Lisa Bernaseck have stated that the relationships between "individuals, state institutions, academic scholarship and colonial arts policies have shaped our understanding of Berber arts". Art historical categories used to explain these relationships, such as the distinction between Arab/urban versus Berber/rural or ethnographical versus artistic objects, "continue to organize the production of knowledge about these arts today" and still are considered not fully adequate to describe the complex social production and interpretation of changing societies in the Maghreb.

== See also ==
- Art jewelry
- Berber culture
- Berber carpet
- Jewellery
- National Jewellery Museum (Morocco)

== Sources ==
- Becker, Cynthia (2006). Amazigh arts in Morocco : women shaping Berber identity (PDF). Austin: University of Texas Press. ISBN 978-0-292-79591-4. OCLC 568018126.
- Becker, Cynthia (2010). "Deconstructing the history of Berber arts: tribalism, matriarchy and a primitive Neolithic past". In Hoffman, Katherine E.; Miller, Susan Gilson (eds.). Berbers and others: Beyond tribe and nation in the Maghrib. Bloomington: Indiana University Press. pp. 195–220. ISBN 978-0-253-35480-8.
- Becker, Cynthia (2014). "Jewelry art. Masterpieces of Berber identity". In Dahlström, Björn (ed.). Berber women of Morocco. Paris: Éditions Artlys. pp. 43–75. ISBN 978-2-85495-576-7. OCLC 902727356.
- Besancenot, Jean (1988) [1942]. Costumes et types du Maroc illustrés de soixante gouaches reproduites en facsimile et en camaïeu. Paris: Horizons de France. ISBN 978-2-85744-357-5.
- Besancenot, Jean (2001) [1953]. Bijoux arabes et berbères du Maroc: 40 planches comprenant 193 modèles de bijoux, dessinés et commentés. Casablanca: Editions de la Cigogne. ISBN 978-9954-0-2672-4.
- Camps-Fabrer, Henriette (1970). Les Bijoux de grande Kabylie. Algiers, Arts et métiers graphiques: Collections du Musée du Bardo et du Centre de recherches anthropologiques, préhistoriques et ethnographiques.
- Camps-Fabrer, Henriette (1990). Bijoux berbères d'Algérie: Grande Kabylie, Aurès. Aix-en-Provence: Édisud.
- Chakour, Djamila, et al. (2016). Des tresors a porter: Bijoux et parures du Maghreb: Collection J.-F. Et M.-L. Bouvier. Paris: Institut du monde arabe. ISBN 978-2-84306-184-4 OCLC 1005136135
- Draguet, Michel; de Merode, Nathalie (2020). Berber memories: women and jewellery in Morocco through the Gillion Crowet Collections. Brussels: Mercatorfonds. ISBN 978-0-300-25395-5.
- Eudel, Paul (1902). L'orfévrerie algérienne et tunisienne. New edition 2014, Casablanca: Éditions Frontispice, ISBN 978-9954-612-20-0
- Eudel, Paul (1906). Dictionnaire des bijoux de l'Afrique du Nord. Maroc, Algérie, Tunisie, Tripolitaine. Paris: Leroux.
- Gargouri-Sethom, Samira (1986). Le bijou traditionnel en Tunisie: femmes parées, femmes enchaînées (in French). La Calade, Aix-en-Provence: Edisud. ISBN 978-2-85744-269-1. OCLC 18290125.
- Gélard, Marie-Luce (2012). "Le rôle des objets dans les rituels de mariage collectifs (Sahara, Maroc)" (The role of objects in collective wedding rituals (Sahara, Morocco))". In Anstett, Élisabeth; Marie-Luce Gélard (eds.). Les objets ont-ils un genre? Culture matérielle et production sociale des identités sexuées (in French). Paris: Armand Colin. pp. 89–104. ISBN 978-2-200-27713-0.
- Grammet, Ivo (1998). "Les Bijoux". In Grammet, Ivo; de Meersman, Min (eds.). Splendeurs du Maroc. Tervuren: Musée royal de l'Afrique centrale. pp. 212–339. ISBN 90-75894-14-7.
- Loughran, Kristyne (2006). "Tuareg women and their jewelry". In Seligman, Thomas K.; Loughran, Kristyne (eds.). Art of being Tuareg : Sahara nomads in a modern world. Los Angeles: Iris & B. Gerald Cantor Center for Visual Arts at Stanford University UCLA Fowler Museum of Cultural History. pp. 167–212. ISBN 978-0-9748729-4-0. OCLC 61859773.
- Rabaté, Marie-Rose (2015). Les bijoux du Maroc : du Haut-Atlas à la vallée du Draa (in French). Paris-La Défense: ACR édition. ISBN 978-2-86770-210-5. OCLC 932463823.
- Rabaté, Marie-Rose; Goldenberg, André; Thau, Jean-Louis (1999). Bijoux du Maroc du Haut Atlas à la Méditerranée, depuis le temps des juifs jusqu'à la fin du XXe siècle. Aix-en-Provence: Edisud/Eddif. ISBN 978-2-7449-0081-5.
- Rabaté, Marie-Rose; Rabaté, Jacques; Champault, Dominique (1996). Bijoux du Maroc: du Haut Atlas à la vallée du Draa. Aix-en-Provence: Edisud/Le Fennec. ISBN 978-2-85744-864-8.
- Rouach, David (1989). Bijoux berbères au Maroc dans la tradition judéo-arabe [Berber jewellery in Marocco in the Jewish-Arabic tradition] (in French). Courbevoie, Paris: ACR. ISBN 978-2-86770-034-7. OCLC 21160206.
