= Ordre du Mérite Saharien =

French order of chivalry (1958–1963)

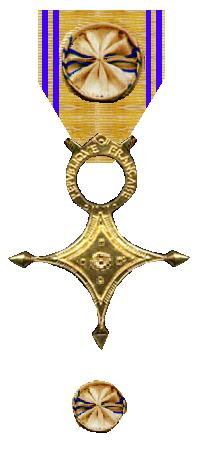
- The medal of the officer
- Type: Order with three degrees: Commandeur; Officier; Chevalier
- Awarded for: Service in the development of the Saharan regions
- Presented by: France
- Status: Deprecated 3 December 1963 by the Ordre National du Mérite
- Established: 4 April 1958

Highlights
- Total recipients: 764: Cdr. 42, Off. 123, Chev. 602

Precedence
- Next (higher): Médaille militaire
- Equivalent: Ordre National du Mérite
- Next (lower): Croix de guerre

The Ordre du Mérite Saharien (Order of Saharan Merit) was established in 1958 as a reward for social, scientific, economic or administrative services rendered by French or foreign persons who participated in the development of Saharan regions. The medal is fashioned in the form of the Agadez Cross, a traditional emblem of the Tuareg clans inhabiting the area of the former Sultanate of Agadez in Agadez, Niger.

The order was deprecated by decree on 3 December 1963, and superseded by the Ordre National du Mérite. Extant members of the order are permitted to wear their original decorations.

== Classes ==
The Order has three classes:

- Commandeur (Commander)
- Officier (Officer)
- Chevalier (Knight)

Ribbon bars
Knight	Officer	Commander
