= National Jewellery Museum (Morocco) =

Public museum in Rabat, Morocco

Coordinates: 34°01′50″N 06°50′08″W

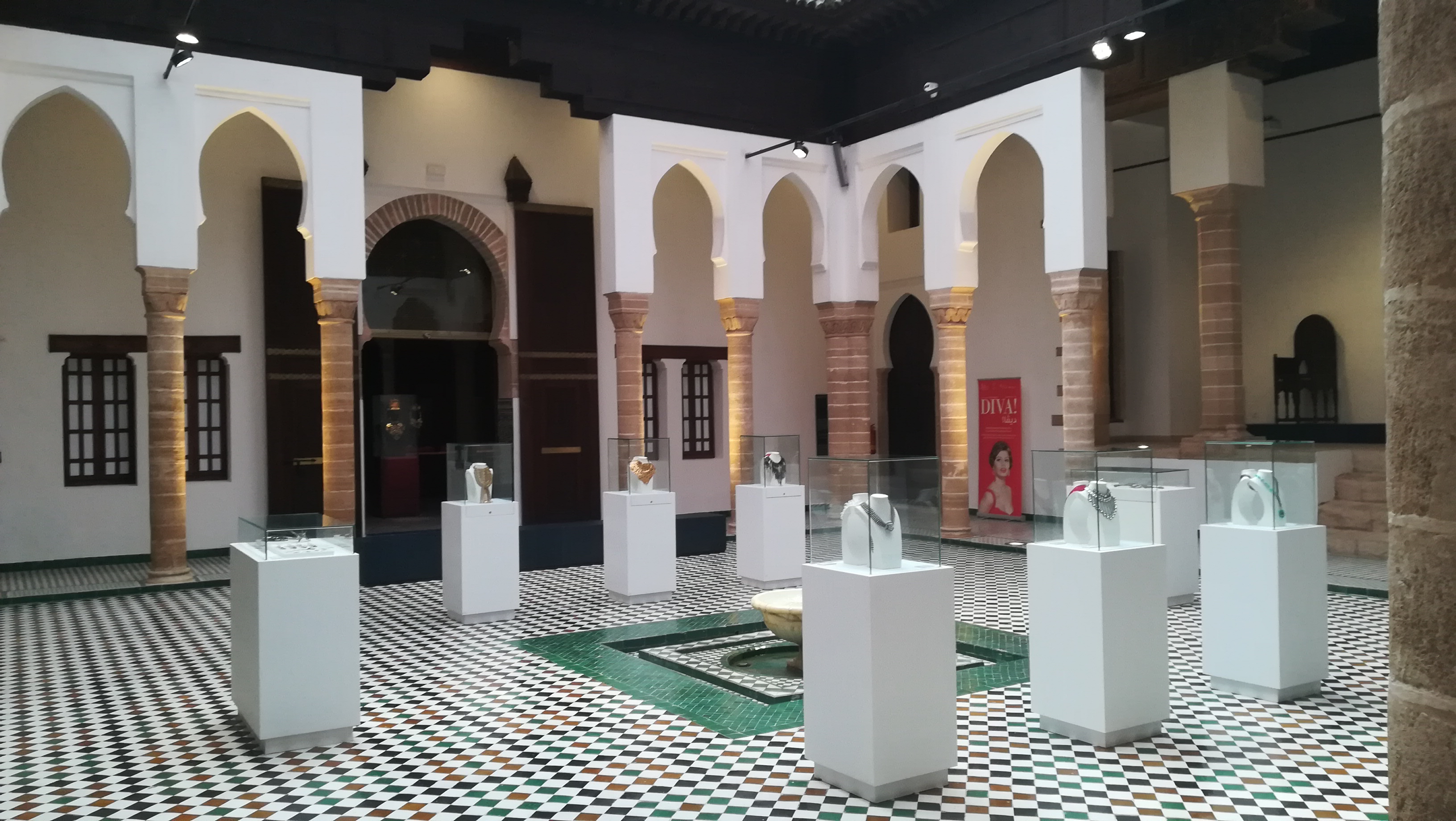
Museum interior courtyard with temporary exhibition of jewellery from Italy, May 2023

The National Jewellery Museum, in French Musée national de la Parure, of Morocco is an ethnographic museum, located in the former Musée des Oudayas in the country's capital Rabat. Along with the Kasbah of the Udayas, the museum's buildings and Andalusian-inspired gardens are part of UNESCO's World Heritage sites in Rabat. Opened to the public in January 2023, the museum attracted 40,000 visitors during the first week.

== Background ==
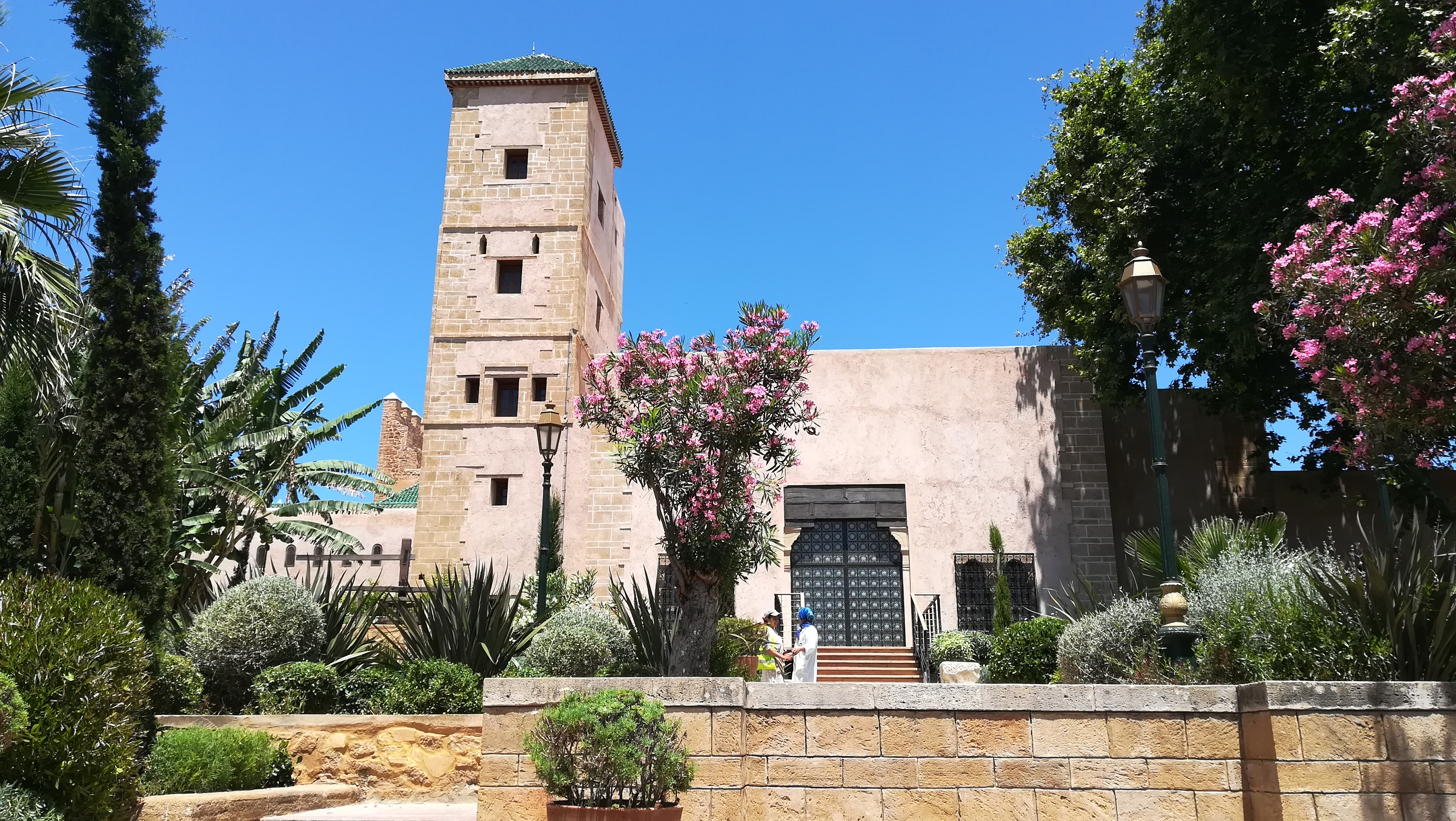
Pavilion of Moulay Ismail and Andalusian-inspired gardens, 2023

=== The Pavilion of Moulay Ismail ===
The southern part of the Kasbah of the Udayas, one of the oldest historical neighbourhoods of Rabat, includes a former pavilion or palace residence built by Sultan Moulay Ismail (ruled 1672–1727) at the end of the 17th century. The building is centred around a main courtyard in the style of a Moroccan riad and is distinguished on the outside by a tower. In 1915, during the French Protectorate over Morocco, the building was converted into a museum on the initiative of Prosper Ricard, director of the Service des Arts Indigènes under Resident-General Hubert Lyautey. It became an ethnographic museum with a collection initially made up of donations from Prosper Ricard himself, orientalist Alfred Bel and ethnographer Jean Besancenot. The museum's collection expanded to include Moroccan jewellery, musical instruments, ceramics, Qur'ans and manuscripts (some as old as the 12th century), costumes, silks, and carpets from different regions of the country.

In 2023, following a thorough restoration, it became the National Jewellery Museum, dedicated to the history of Moroccan jewellery, along with other objects of traditional personal attire. The new museum was officially opened on 7 January 2023, by Moroccan princess Lalla Hasna, Mehdi Qotbi, painter and president of the National Foundation of Museums (FNM), and representatives of the Ministry of Culture as well as other organizations. During the first week after the opening to the public, it attracted 40,000 visitors.

Along with other public museums for archaeology, ethnography or visual arts in Morocco, it is administered by the National Foundation of Museums. The scenography of the National Jewellery Museum was created by Christophe Martin, who had designed a similar exhibition for the Yves Saint Laurent Museum in Marrakesh.

== Collections ==
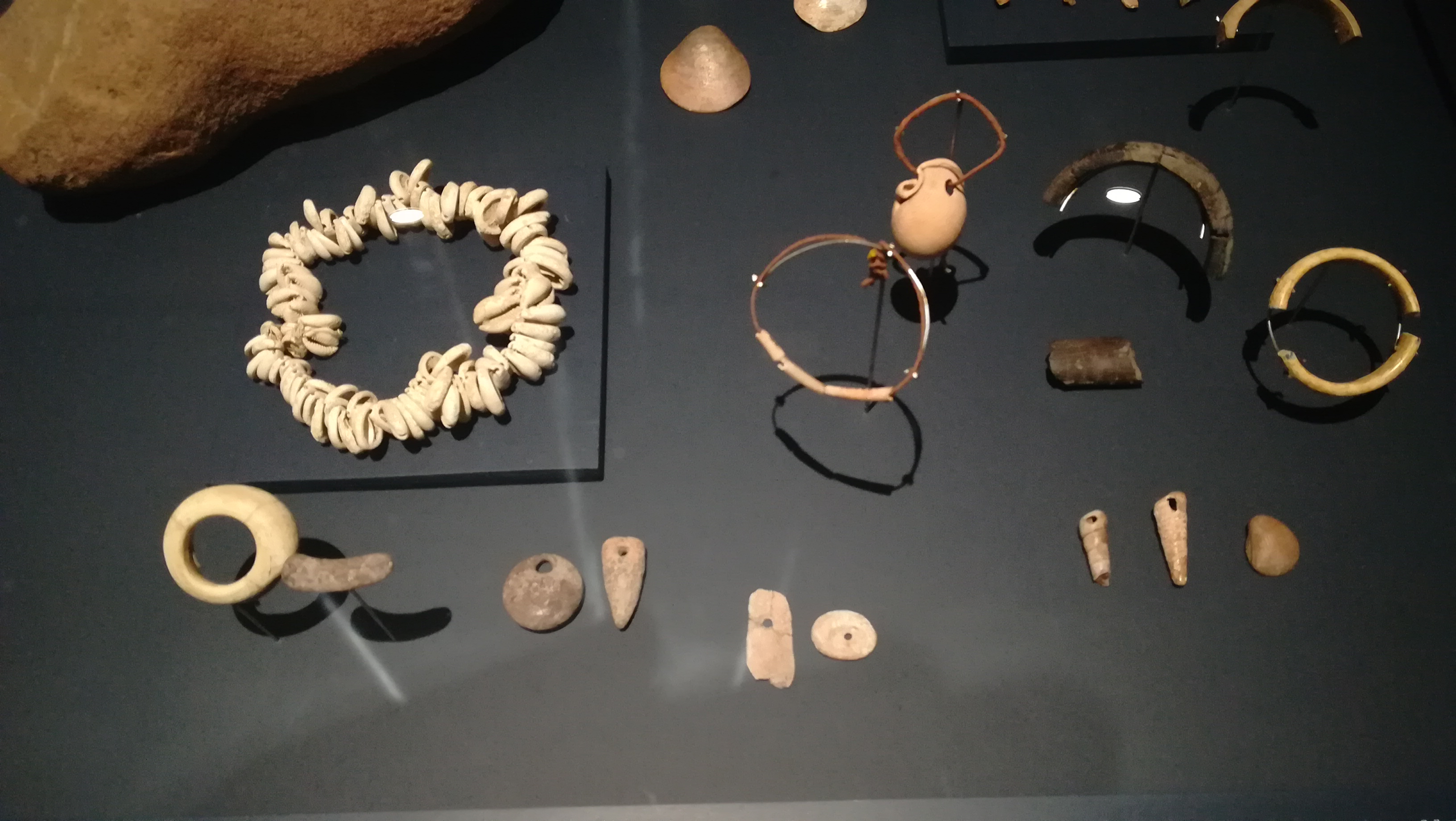
Bizmoune perforated shell beads and other early Middle Stone Age jewellery

Through its collections, the National Jewellery Museum aims to represent the history and geography of Morocco, including the cultural specificities of each region and the workshops for the production of the pieces. The exhibition is divided into five sections, presenting the evolution of jewellery during the history of Morocco, bridal costumes and other female and male adornments, rural Amazigh jewellery and the regional styles of urban jewellery and clothing.

Starting with the oldest known pieces of artefacts made by hominin precursors of modern humans, dated to about 142,000 years, the museum presents a reproduction of perforated shell beads. They were found in 2019 by archaeologists in the Bizmoune cave near Essaouira, Morocco, and show perforations indicating purposeful processing that may have been a token of identity. Further historical periods covered are the pre-historic, pre-Roman (Phoenician and Carthaginian), Roman and Islamic eras, leading up to the early 20th century. The collection comprises around 8,000 items, including historical caftans and urban bridal adornments typical of different cities. A special section of the museum presents hundreds of pieces donated by King Mohammed VI from the royal collection of Amazigh (Berber) jewellery, including a large variety of silver fibula brooches and palm-shaped khmissa amulets.

In addition to its permanent exhibition, the museum has announced a dozen temporary exhibitions per year as part of its mission to promote contemporary and international designs of jewellery or personal attire.

== Research on Moroccan jewellery ==
In his 1953 ethnographic work Bijoux arabes et berbères du Maroc (Arab and Berber jewellery of Morocco), French ethnographer Jean Besancenot published his drawings and descriptions of almost 200 different pieces of Arab urban and Berber rural jewellery from various regions and traditions in Morocco. In the introduction, he commented on the origins, social use and meaning of jewellery for the different communities, as well as on the changing tastes of the customers during the first half of the 20th century. Referring to the respective clients and their tastes, he stated the general rule: Urban jewellery was usually made of gold, precious stones and other adornments, while pieces for rural Berber clients were almost exclusively made of silver. In both groups existed local variations in usage, shape and other elements. As jewellery forms an important part of a woman's dowry in the Maghreb, he further observed:

The adornment of the bride during the week of the wedding is composed of such a quantity of jewellery that only very rich families could offer it to the bride. For the less wealthy families, the negagefs [sic], women specialized in this kind of trade, rented their services for the duration of the wedding ceremonies, along with sumptuous clothes and especially the enormous quantity of jewels deemed essential for the bride to appear with honour and adorned like an idol before her friends, assembled in admiring curiosity.

— Jean Besancenot, Bijoux arabes et berbères du Maroc

Since Besancenot's seminal work about costumes and jewellery in Morocco, further studies and exhibition catalogues discussing the different types and their regional origins have been published mainly in France, including Rabaté (1999 and 2015). Scholars in the United States, such as Becker (2014) and Nicholas (2014), have added studies on the social use and anthropological interpretation of such personal adornments in Morocco.

=== Gallery ===
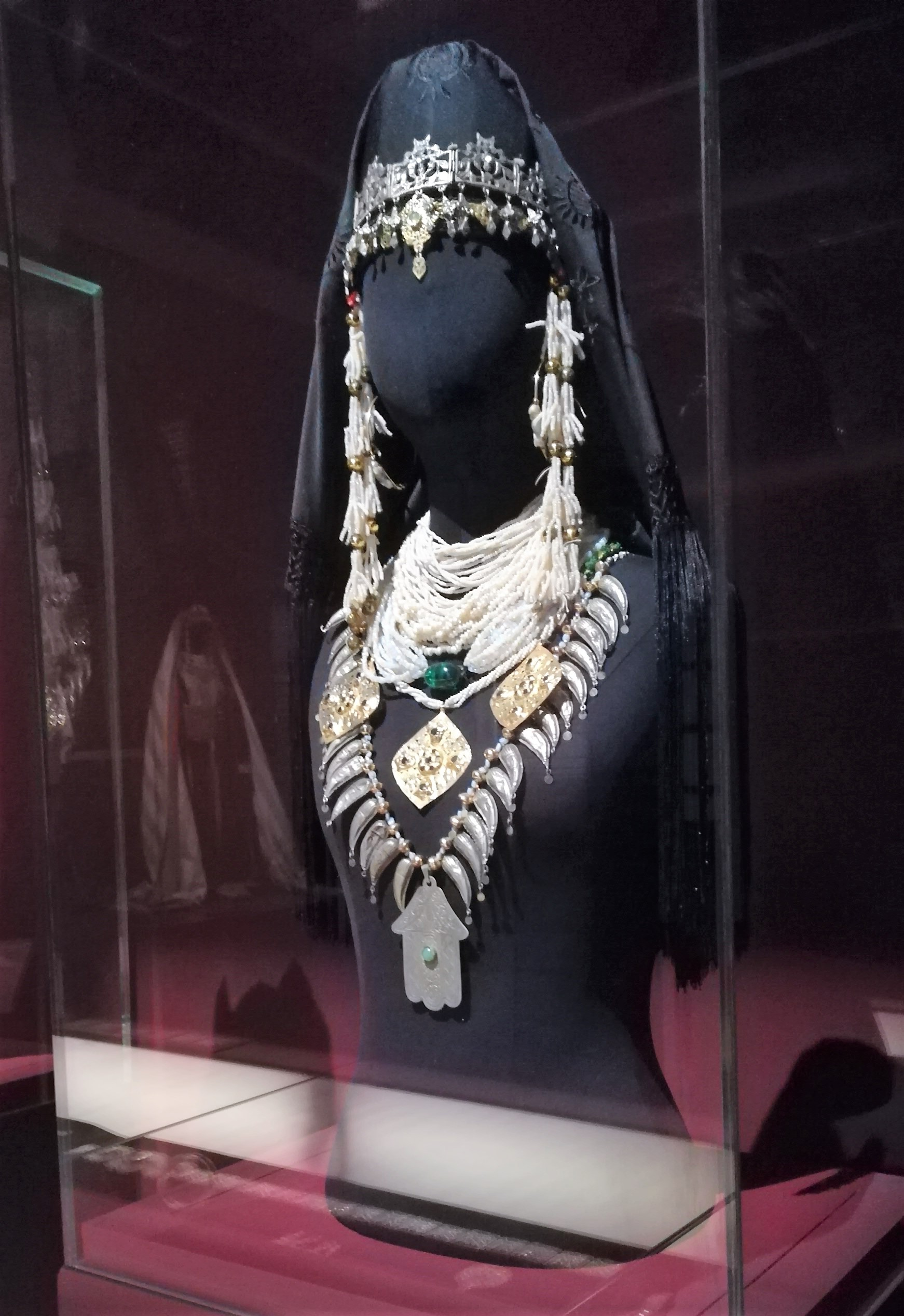
Bride from Tetouan

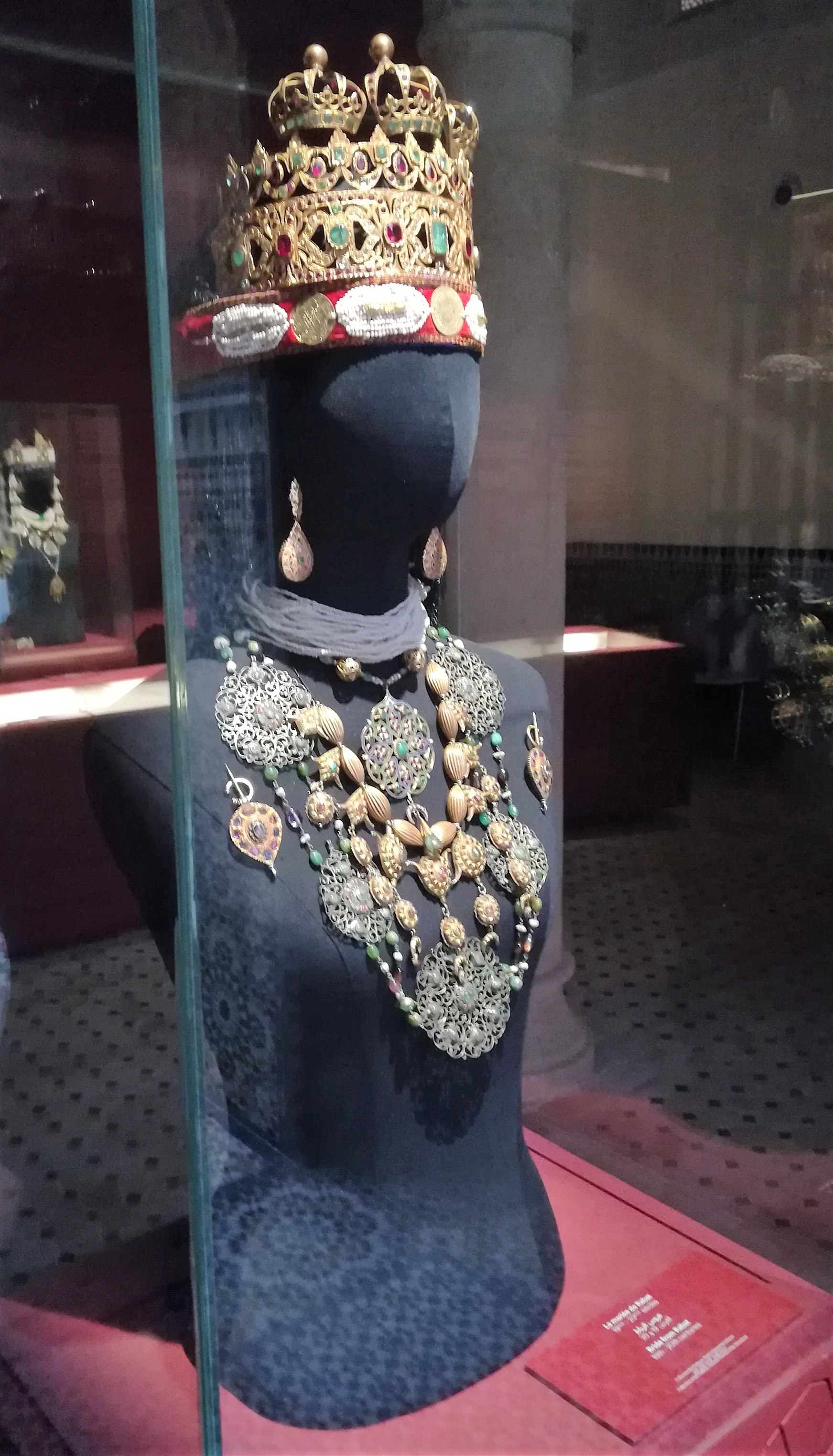
Bride from Rabat

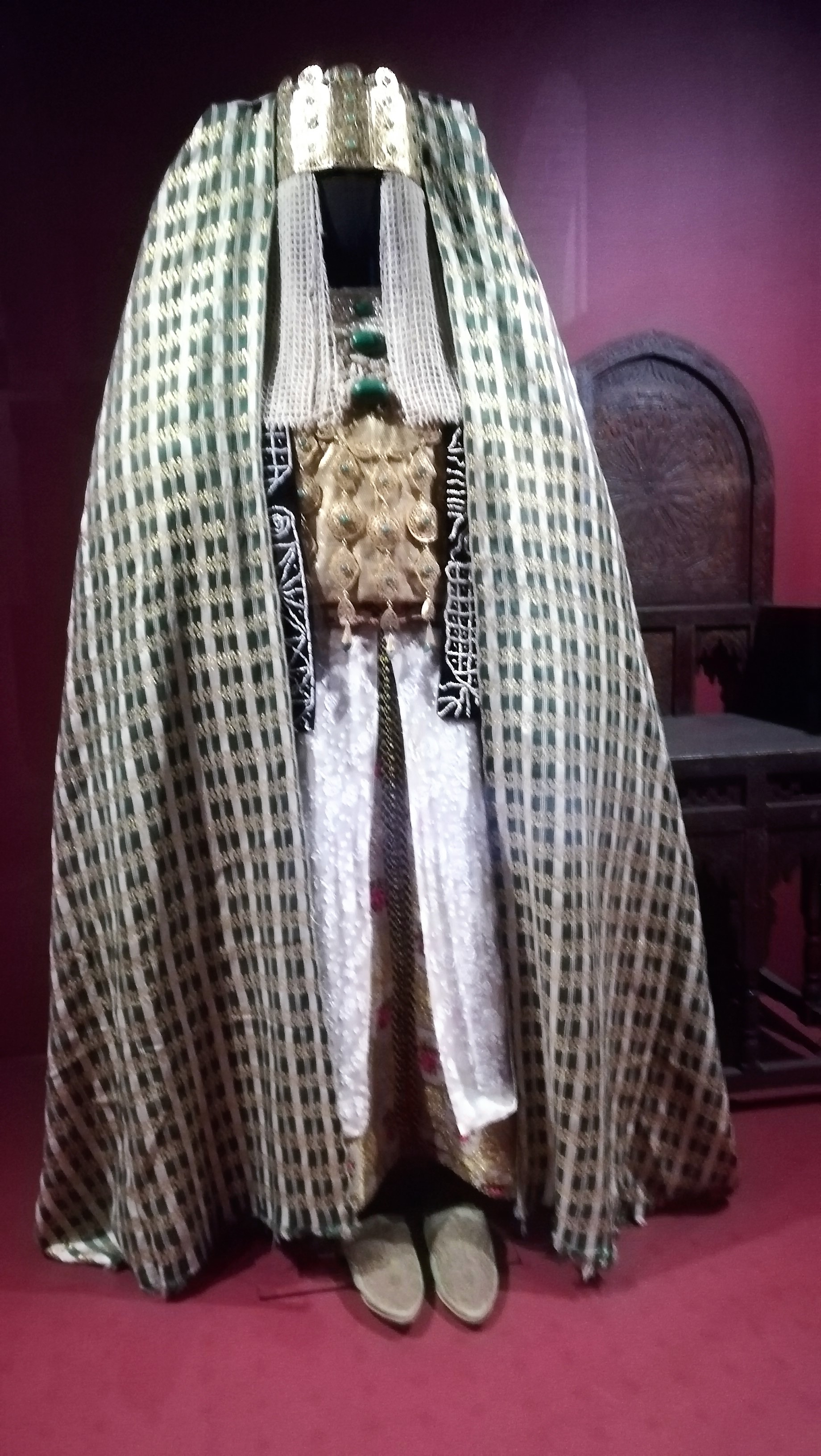
Bride from Fes

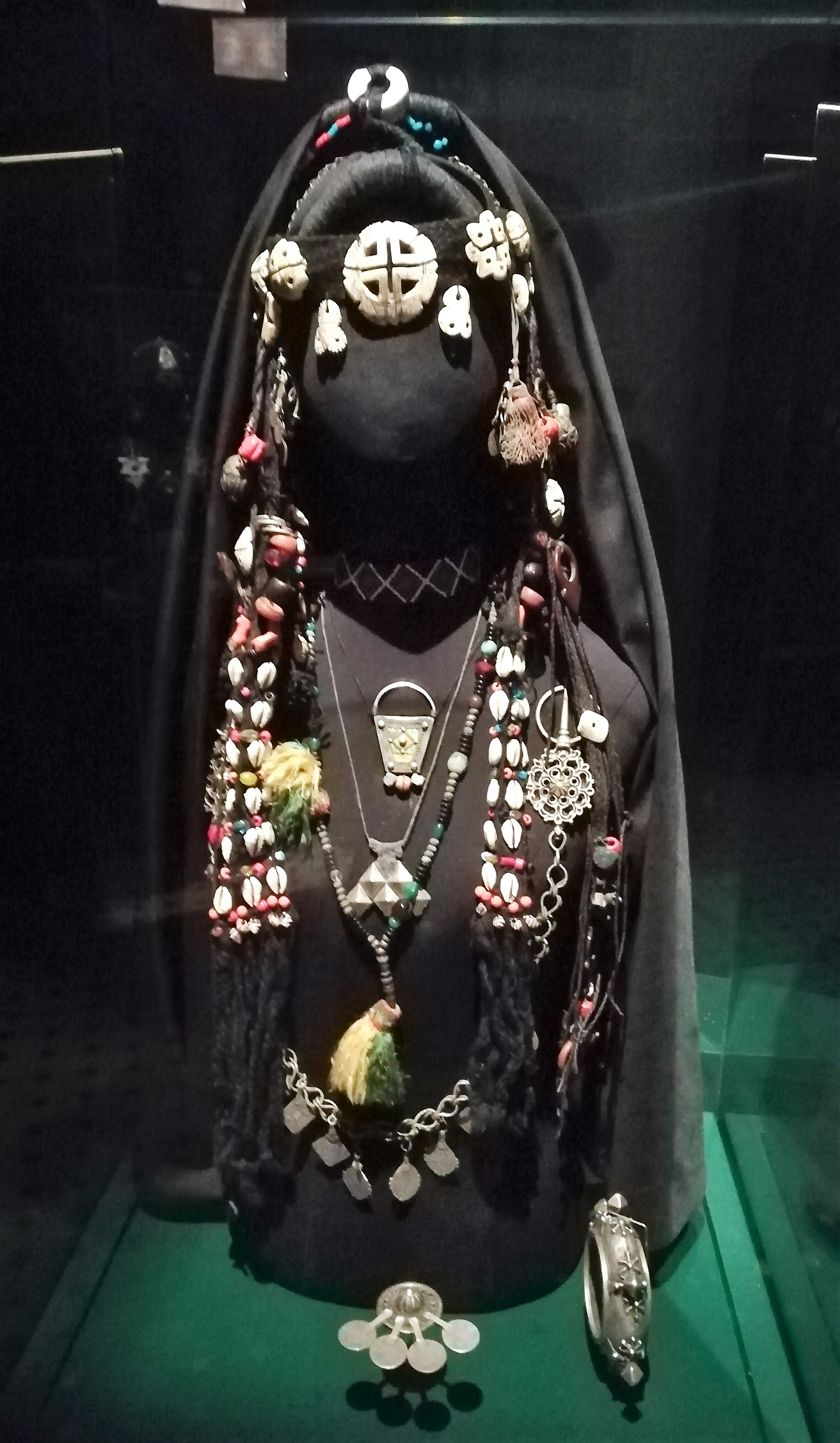
Bride from Guelmim

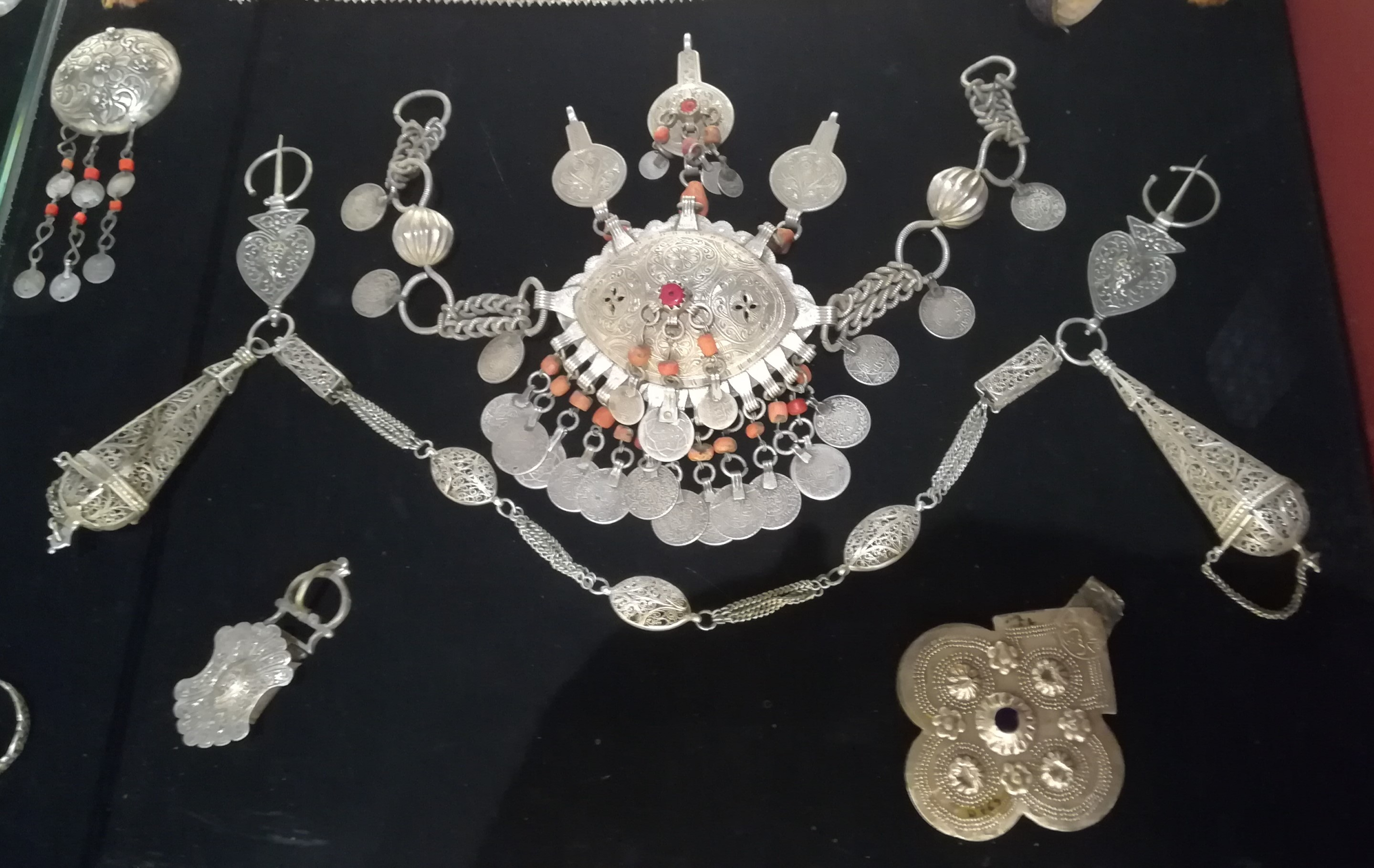
Berber jewellery, silver and coral

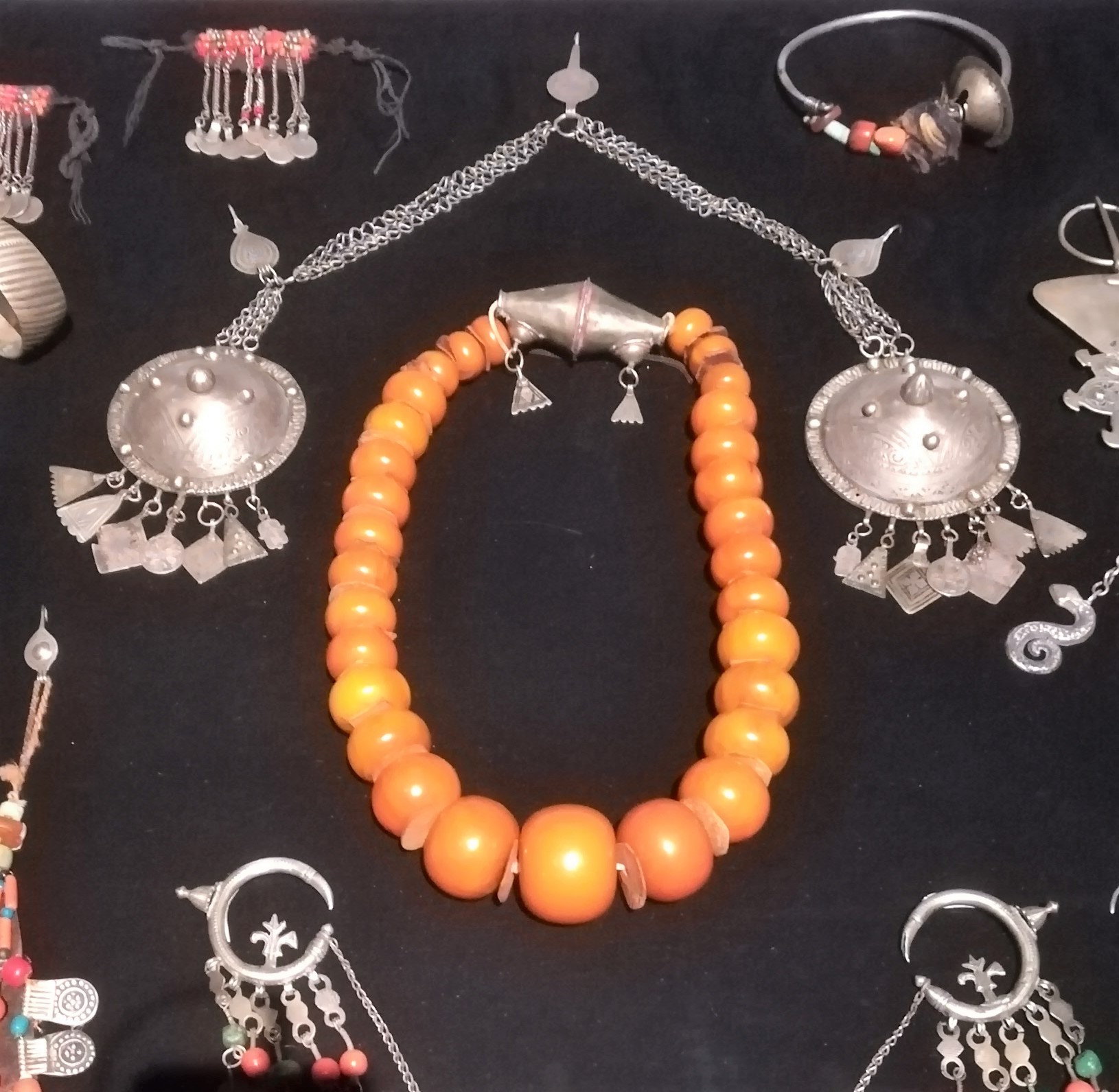
Berber jewellery, silver and amber

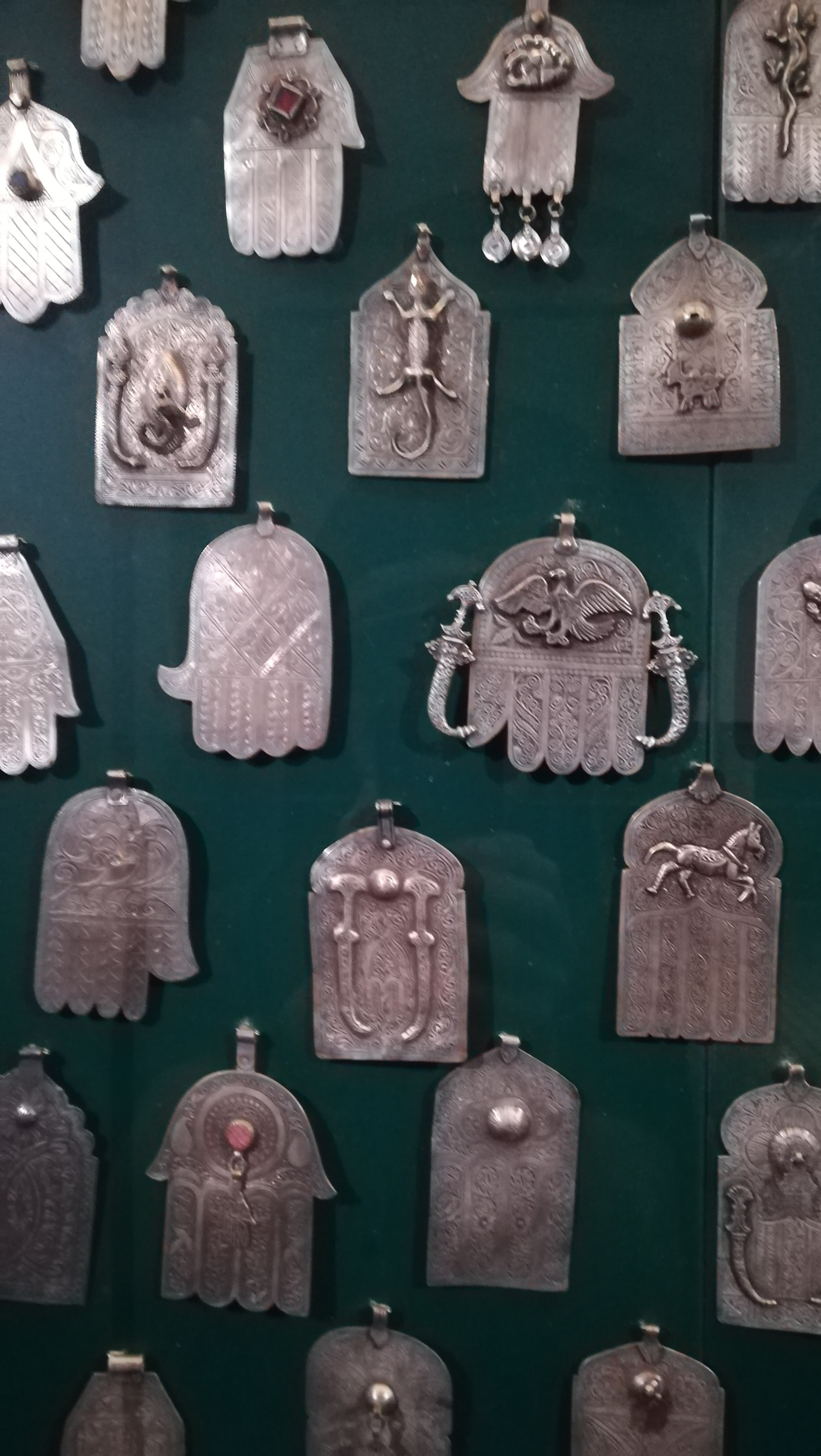
Khmissa amulets

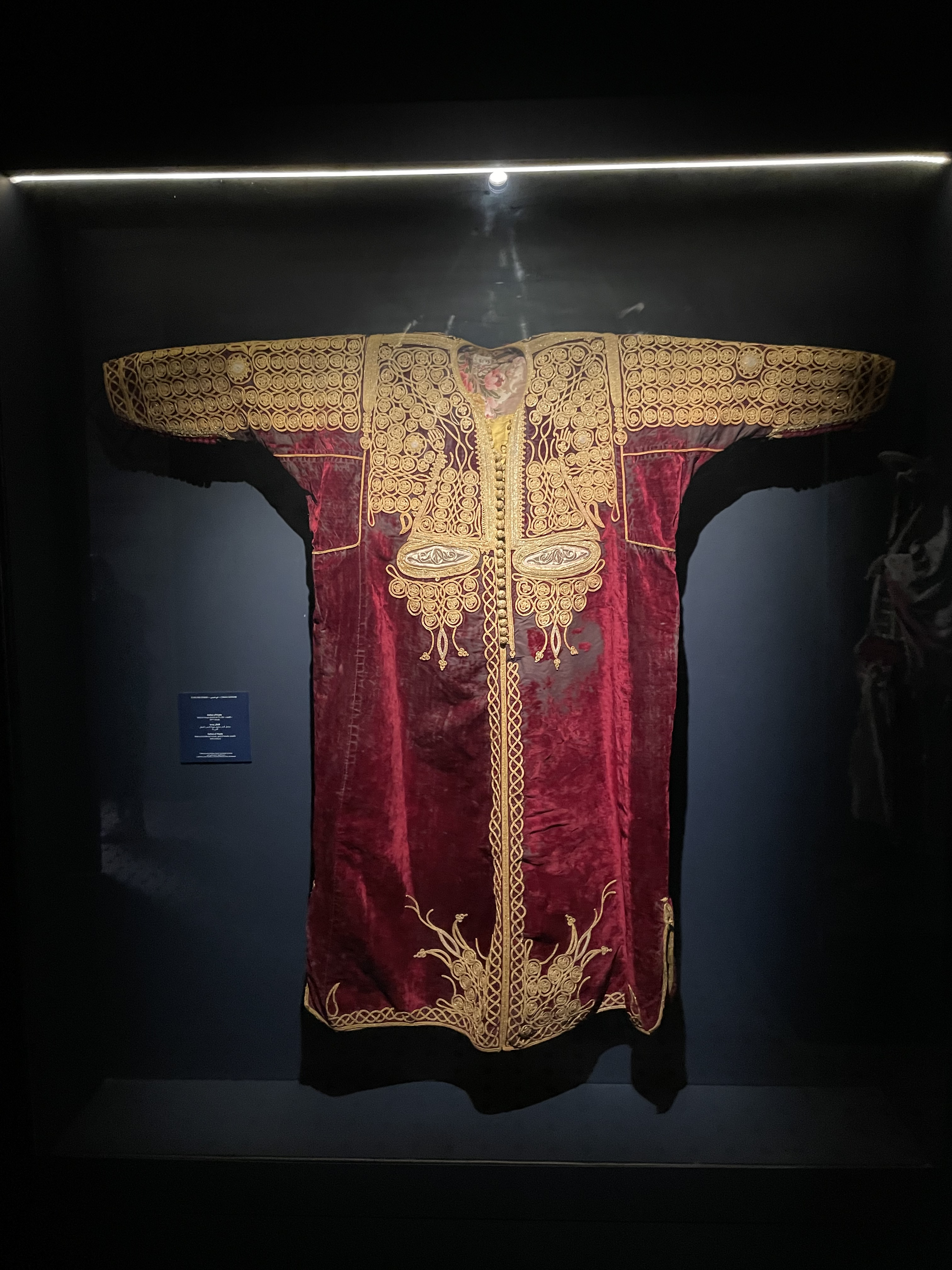
Caftan from Oujda

== See also ==
- Jewellery of the Berber cultures
- List of museums in Morocco
