= Amazigh fibula =

Traditional brooch of North African Berber cultures

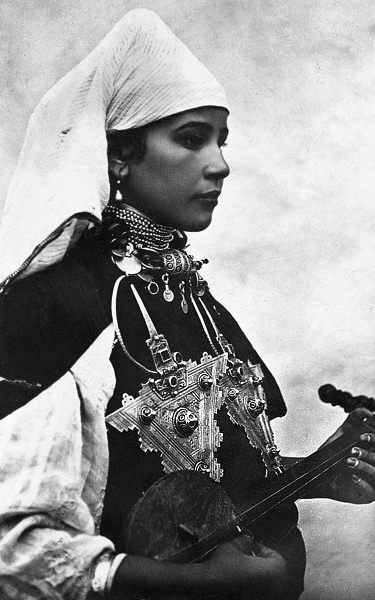
A Shilha musician wearing two large triangular brooches in the Souss region of Morocco at the beginning of the 20th century.

An Amazigh fibula is a traditional fibula or brooch with practical and symbolic importance in Amazigh cultural heritage. As a common item of the jewellery of the Berber cultures, its use was widespread among North African tribes. Its exact form could be different from one tribe to another, but essentially, it consists of a triangle beneath a ring or semicircle and a pin to hold unsewn garments together.

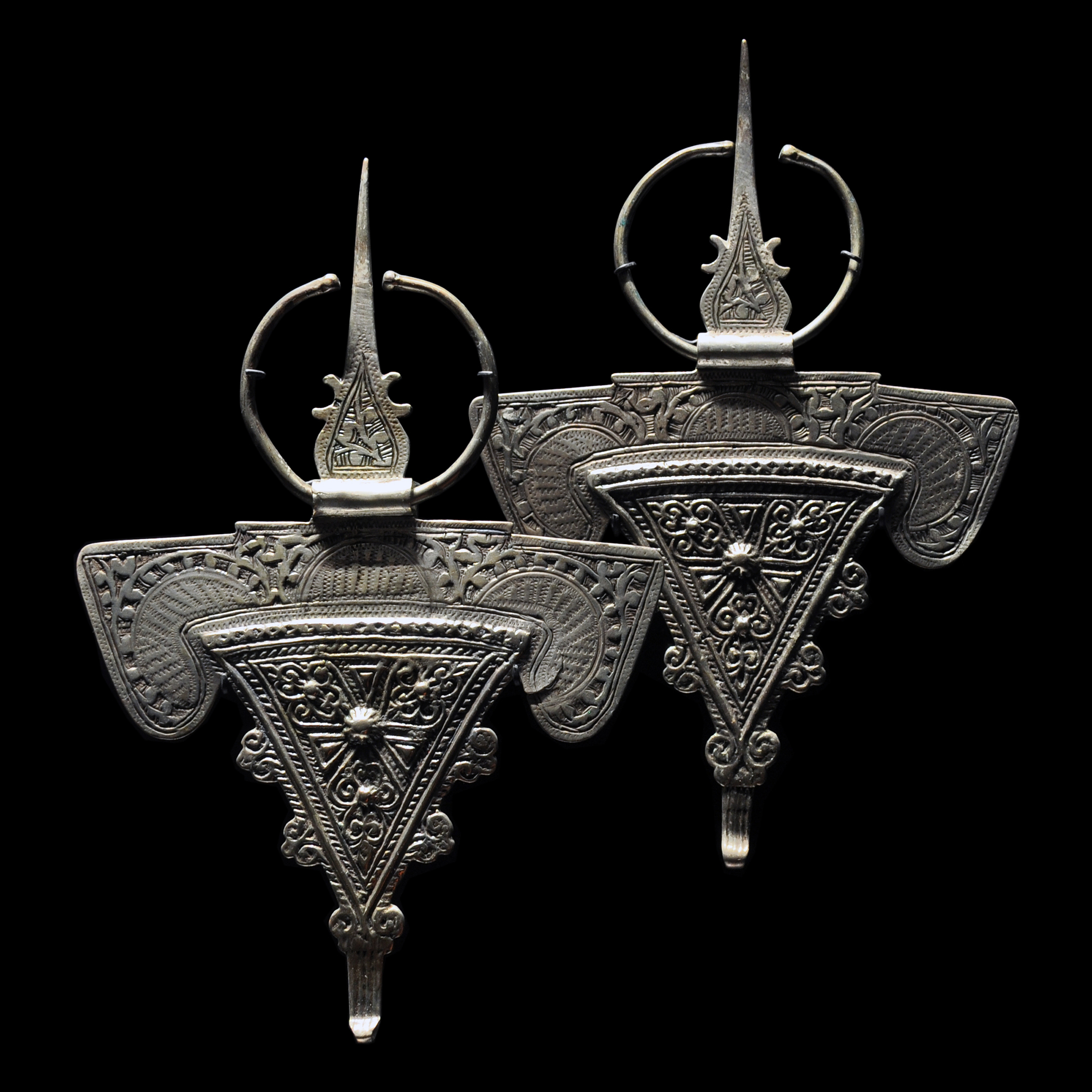
Two Amazigh fibulae crafted from silver on display at the Musée du quai Branly in Paris.

== Local names ==
In the language of the Chleuh, this piece is called tarazwit or tazarzit. The word tazarzit is grammatically feminine, as are all words in this language that begin with a t. It seems that this word is derived from the Tamazight word azar, which means "hair", and this brooch was often woven into hair braids.

In the language of the Rifi tribes, and among most speakers of Amazigh languages, the brooch is called tisighnast, p. tisaaghns, which means "pin" and is derived from the root gh - n - s related to the concept of pinning or securing in all Amazigh languages.

In the Kabylie region of Algeria, the brooch is referred to as an afzim (tafzimt) or abzim (tabzimt), from the Arabic word ibziim (إبزيم), meaning "buckle."

In Moroccan Arabic, it is known by the name bazima, pronounced bzeema (بزيمة), also from ibziim), khalaala (خلالة) or katfiya (كتفية). In Tunisian Arabic, the traditional Fibula is called Khlel (خلال).

== Uses ==
Large brooches were often used decoratively, but medium-sized brooches also exist and were often used as pins. Small brooches were often used in hair braids or as jewelry worn over the forehead.

The shape of this triangular brooch has also become a popular decorative motif.

== See also ==
- Berbers
- Jewellery of the Berber cultures
