= Berber carpet =

Type of carpet

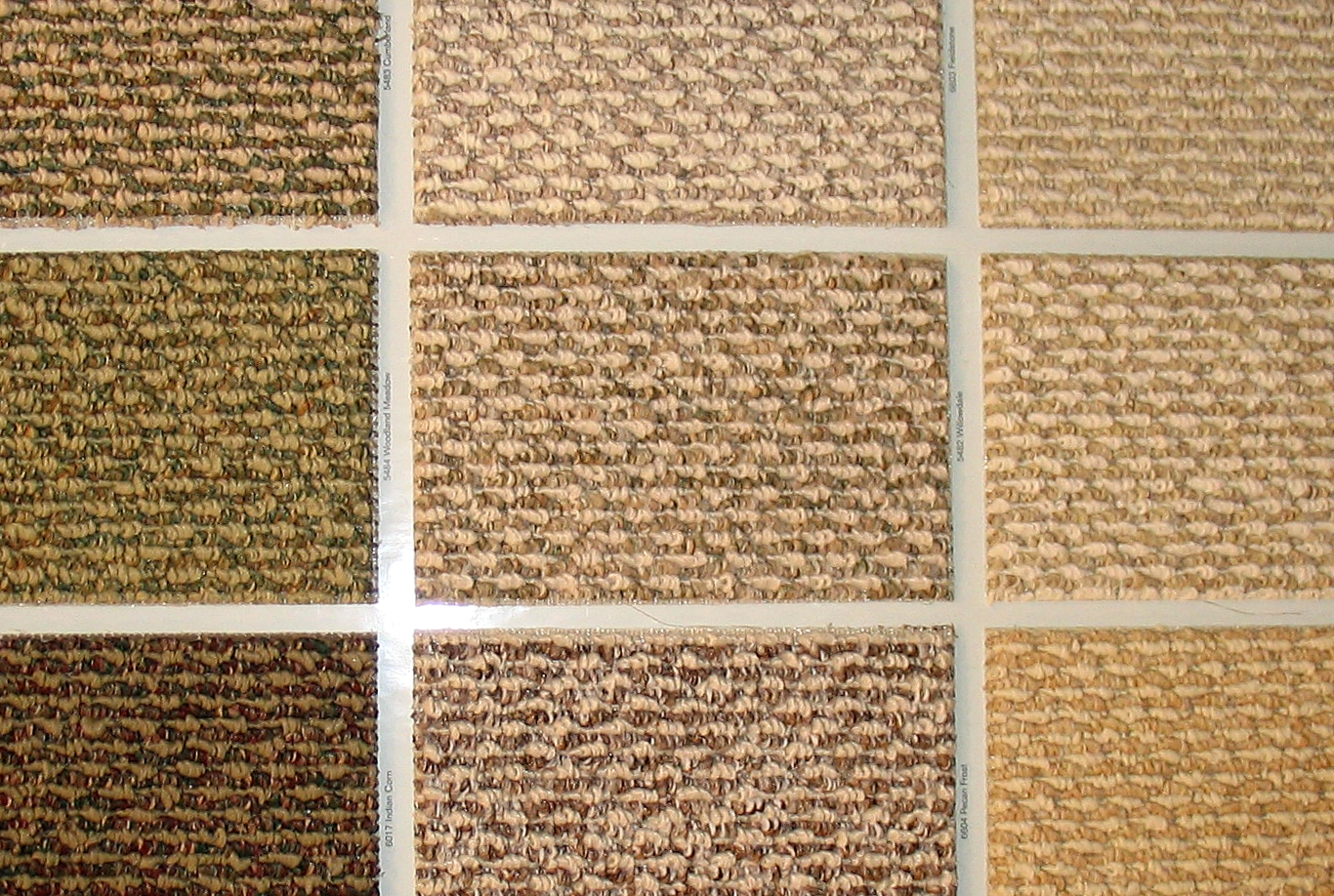
Swatches of Berber carpet

Berber carpets are carpets hand-woven by the Berber people in North Africa and the Sahara. The carpets come in traditional and modern designs, which are distinguished by different knotting patterns, dyes and fabric textures.

== History ==
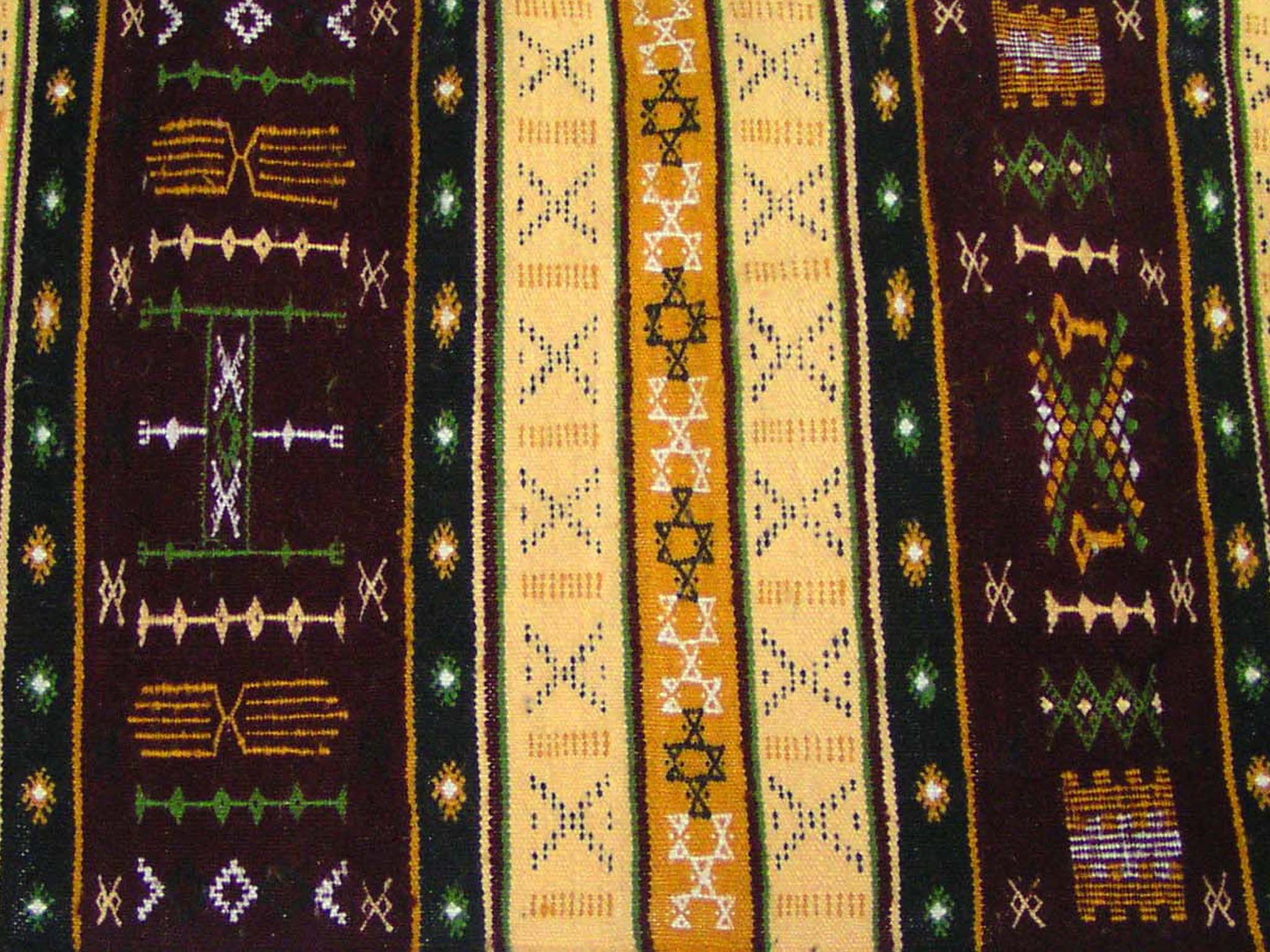
Detail of a traditional Berber carpet

The origin of carpet weaving by the Berber populations dates back several millennia. The hand-spun cloth they created was named after the individual tribe, and they used natural fibres to create cloaks, rugs and other fabrics.

== Traditional and modern carpets ==
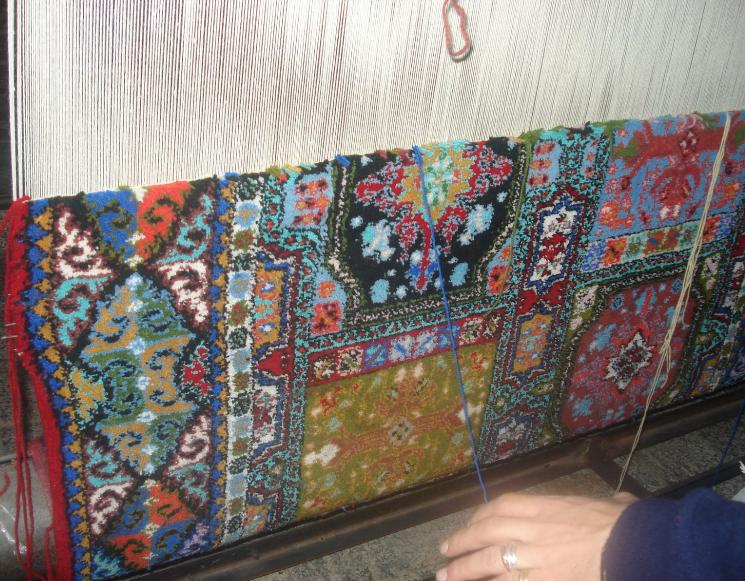
Handmade Berber carpet from Morocco

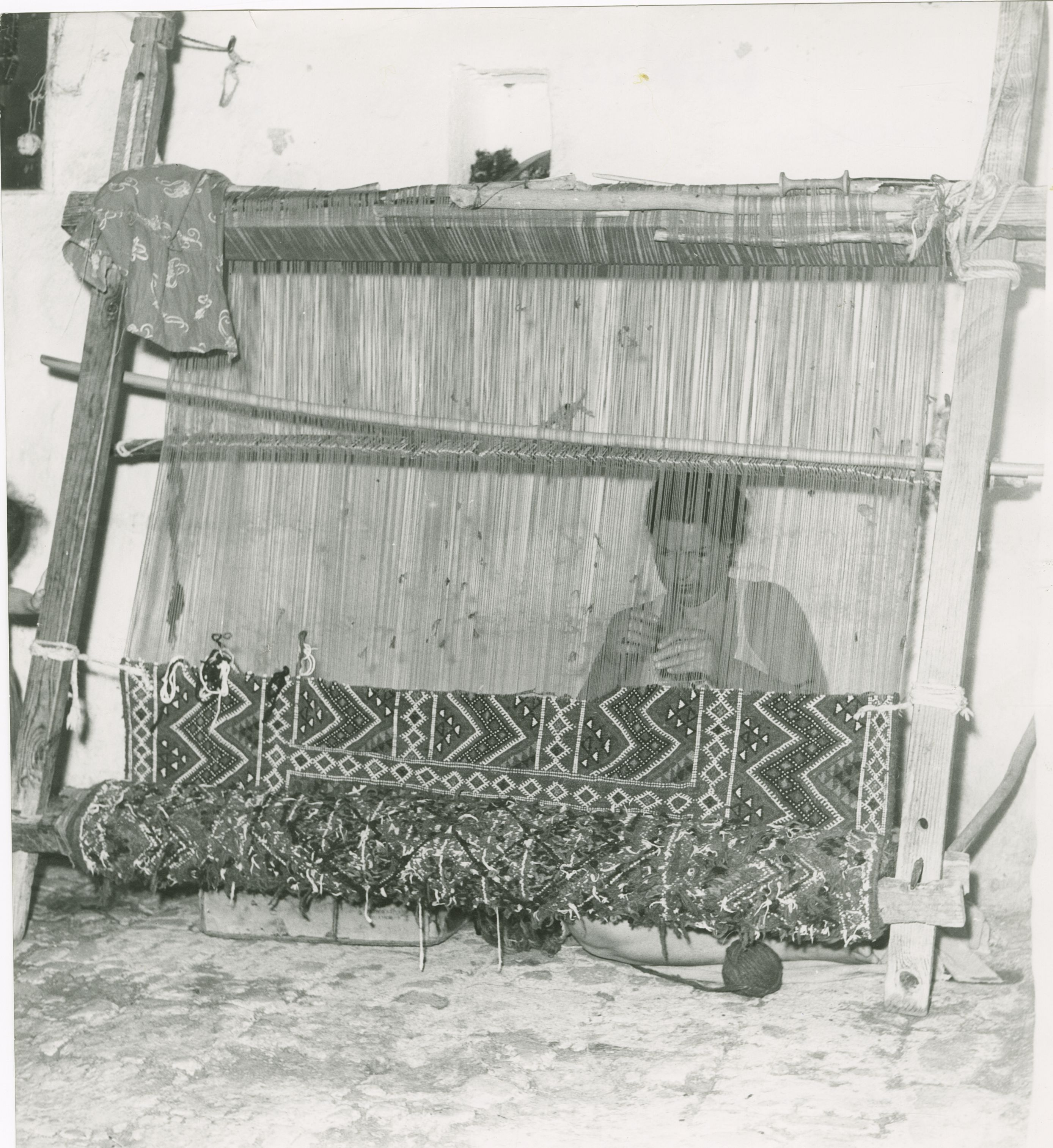
A woman weaving a carpet using a handloom in 1961 in al-Qayrawan

Modern industrialized Berber carpets are distinguished by a loop pile construction type that gives a similar appearance to the distinct knot of traditionally woven Berber carpets. The modern carpets usually contain small flecks of dark colour on lighter shades of background colours resembling a natural undyed version of the traditional carpets. They generally consist of a plain colour mix with no pattern, and are relatively cheap and durable. Popular for areas with significantly heavy use such as offices. The distinctive knot texture and appearance of traditional hand-woven Berber carpets today are generally woven in brightly coloured designs that are different from other oriental rugs.

Handmade and usually homemade Berber carpets are still an active industry in many rural areas of Berber countries. Many Berber families earn their primary income from building-up carpets manually and selling them in local markets, merchants and tourists. Traditional Berber carpets differ from modern mass-produced Berber carpets that are usually found in industrialized markets. They often employ cultural designs and are typically made of natural materials

Today, there are numerous types of modern Berber carpet made from a wide variety of materials, Nylon, Olefin fibre and wool are the most frequently used materials. Tunisian Berber carpets and rugs, usually called "Mergoum", which still preserve techniques inherited from ancestral weaving methods. Tunisian authorities are still controlling every piece to guarantee quality and that 'Berber' spirit in designs, patterns and symbols knotted so only wool is permitted with a total ban of any synthetic material, then each rug or carpet is sealed with a red wax sign (of Tunisian handicrafts authorities).

In other countries, Olefin is the most frequently used and most affordable material, and carpets with blends of the different materials are also available.

Berber carpet is highly durable and is often found in offices, schools, and other high traffic areas. It is stain resistant as well, and is generally more affordable than thicker plush carpets. To care about it is recommended by most professionals that Moroccan Olefin Berber should be cleaned using a low-moisture or dry cleaning process. Traditional steam cleaning with high alkaline detergents can cause potential pH burns in the olefin. These appear as large yellow or brown splotches. Yellow or brown spots also may be tannin bleed from the sugars in natural fibre carpets that are drawn to the top by improper drying usually caused by overwetting. There are carpet chemicals that can remove most of this yellowing or browning but they are very expensive, and it would be better to not get the yellowing or browning. A better, but more difficult, method may be to dry the carpet from the bottom. This method would generally require lifting up some of the carpet to install a carpet fan under the carpet, and using hot air, not just room temperature air. Regrettably, many of these stains can be permanent if not corrected immediately by a professional carpet cleaner. As with all carpets, Berber should be cleaned every 6 to 12 months to prevent permanent wear patterns.

== Bibliography ==
- Barbatti, Bruno; Berber Carpets of Morocco: The Symbols, Origin and Meaning, www.acr-edition.com, 2009, ISBN 2-86770-184-8
