= Agadez Cross =

Symbol

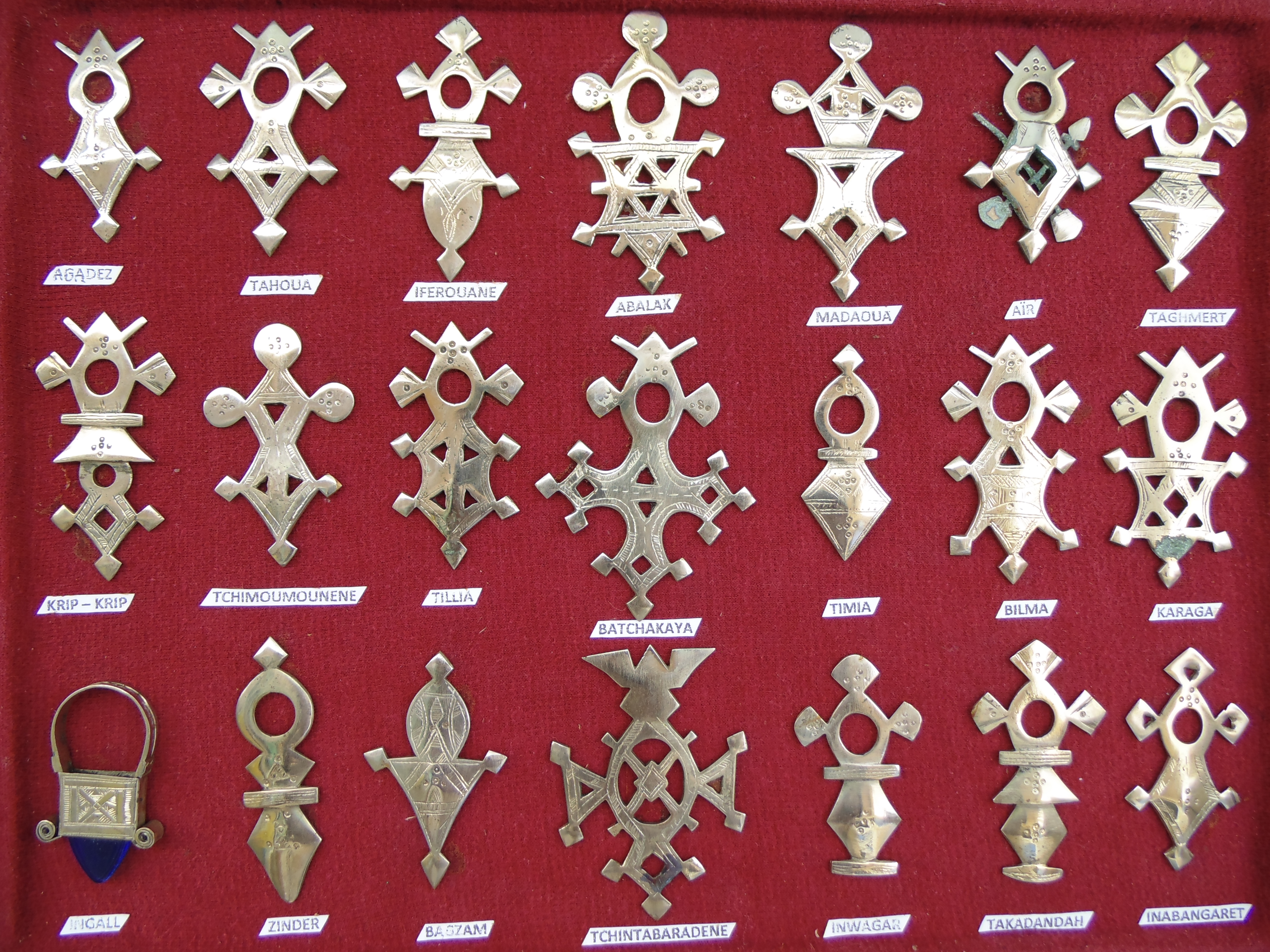
The 21 Nigerien crosses

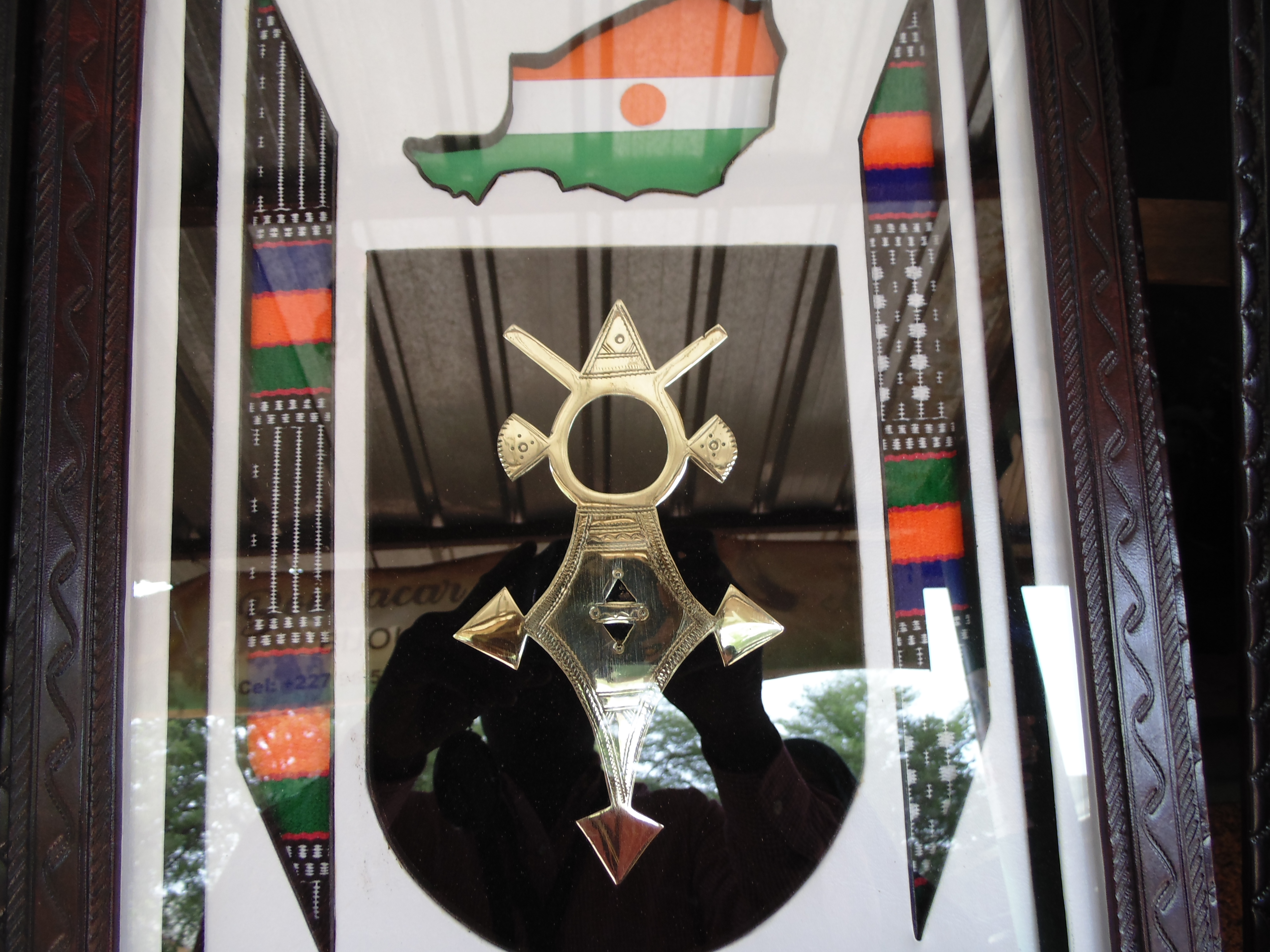
Table of the Cross of Agadez with "Téra-téra" on both sides of the shield ("Tera-Téra" is a type of interwoven cloth strips native to the Zarma/Songhai) and a Niger coloured map on top.

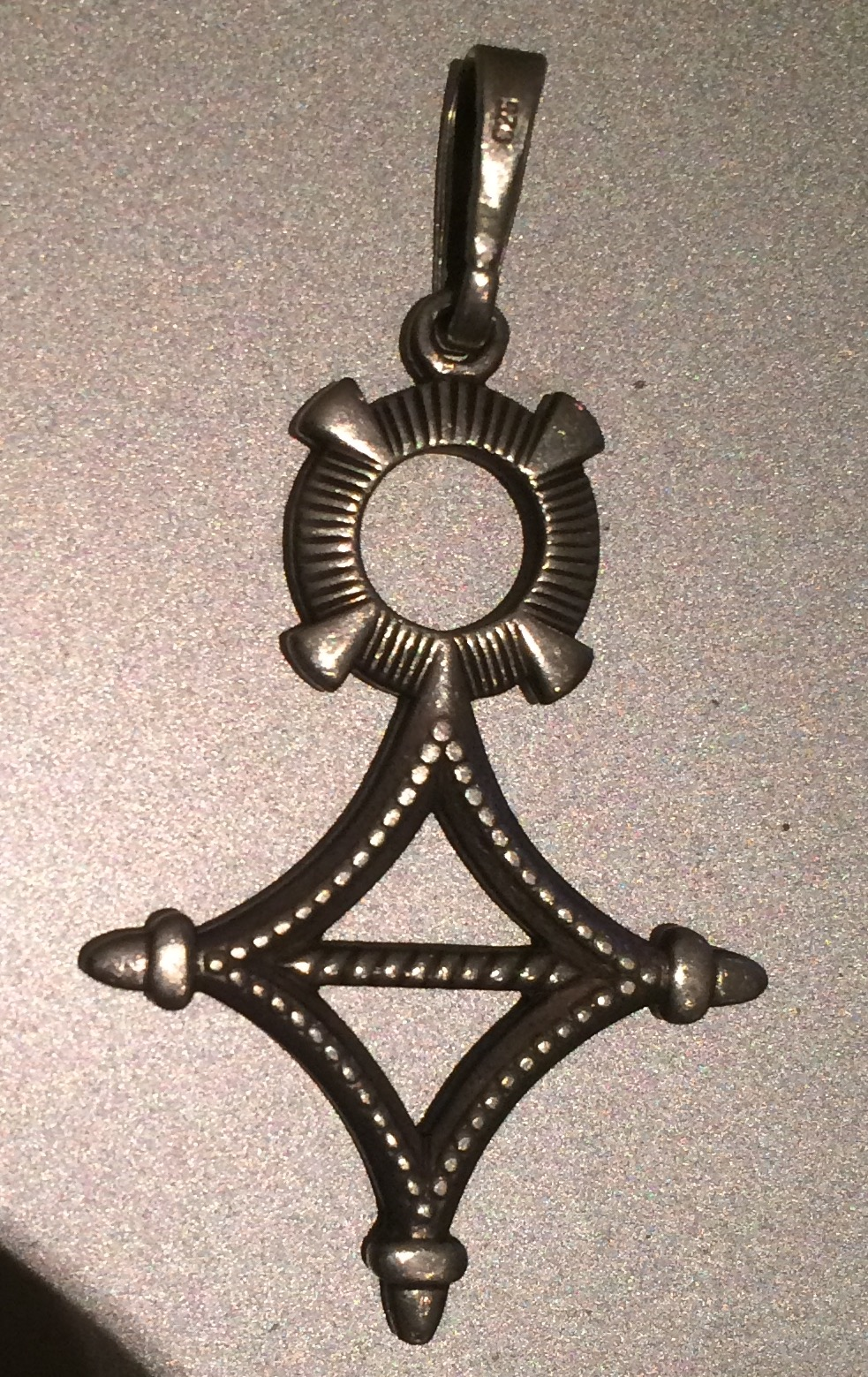
The Cross of Agadez

The Agadez Cross (also Agadès Cross, Cross of Niger, French: Croix d’Agadez) is the most popular category of Saharan Berber jewelry made especially by the Tuareg people of Niger. Only a few of these pieces of jewelry exactly resemble a cross. For most of them, it is a pendant with a varied silhouette, related either to a cross (tanaghilt), or to a form of plate or shield (talhakim). The former is made of stone or copper. The blacksmiths generally use silver and the so-called "lost wax" casting process without ever hammering the metal.

== Denomination ==
These crosses are generally called tanaghilt (tanaɣilt) or tasagalt, which means "cast in a mold". Soft stone jewelry and jewelry cut from platelets of copper, aluminum, or other metal are most commonly known as talhakim, a term used for jewelry resembling a form of plate or plate shield.

An alternative tamashek name, but which designates pendants in general, is "zakkat". The term "kaulé" is also widespread in the Sahel.

== Use ==
The current use of tanaghilt and talhakim is restricted to a few Tuareg tribes: the Kel Aïr, the Kel Geress; as well as to non-Berber ethnic groups across Niger who have adopted it such as the Songhai, Zarma, Peuls and the Hausa peoples of Niger. These types of jewelry are rare and almost ignored by other Tuaregs. As ornaments, they are suspended from the neck. In the case of tanaghilt, they are fixed on a woman's veil or the forehead, but turned upside down.

== Meaning ==
Any question about their symbolism put to the users generally elicits only vague answers. Some attribute to it a function of "grigri" or “reserve of wealth". The ethnologists Germaine Dieterlen and Ziedonis Ligers spotted a situation where the father gave the jewel to his son in age of virility, marriage and nomadism, saying to him: "My son, I give you the four directions of the world, because we do not know where you will go to die".

According to one Tuareg elder narration, a young nomadic warrior wanted to declare his love to the young girl of his heart, the latter being locked up at home and therefore inaccessible to his messages. The village blacksmith then had a very important place in Tuareg society. As such, the blacksmith had the right to enter the houses of all the families with whom he traded with. The young man then had a jewel forged which combines the two syllables of the Tamashek word "T (a) R (a)" ("tara" meaning "love" and spelled "ⵜⵔ" in the Tifinagh alphabet) and entrusted the blacksmith with the mission of transmitting the message of love to his beloved in the greatest discretion.

Historically, the image may derive from ancient stylized images of the Carthaginian goddess Tanit.
