= LucFosther Diop =

Cameroonian artist, filmmaker, actor and entrepreneur

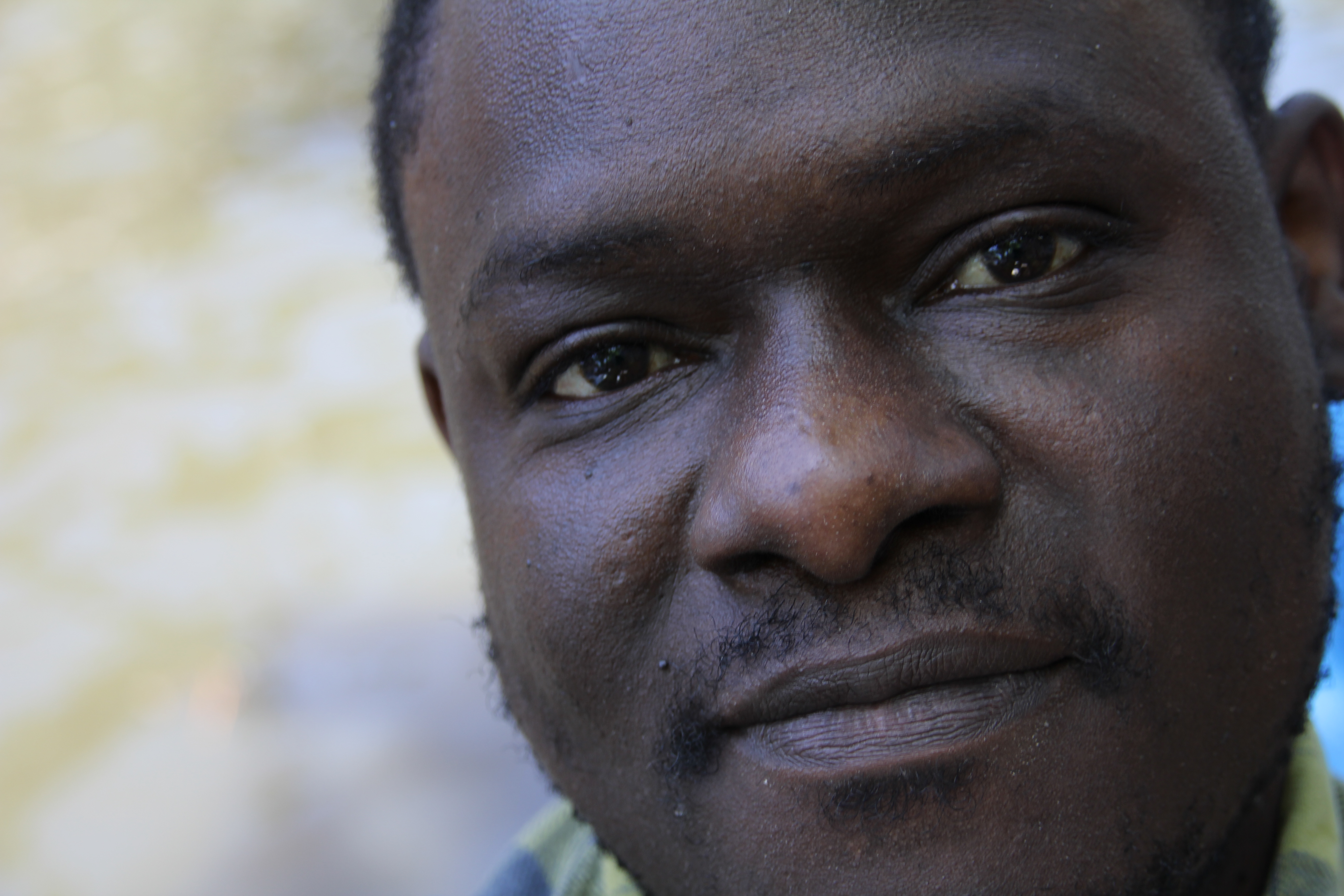
- Born: Lucas Fotsing Takou; 1980 (age 45–46); Douala, Cameroon
- Citizenship: Camroonian
- Education: University of Yaoundé I
- Occupations: Artist filmmaker actor and entrepreneur
- Awards: UNESCO/Aschberg Award, CALQ and Ville de Québec Grant, LA CHAMBRE BLANCHE, Quebec, 2013

Lucas Fotsing Takou (born 1980), known as LucFosther Diop, is a Cameroonian artist, filmmaker, actor and entrepreneur. As an artist, he is best known for his drawings, collages, performances and films exploring the ongoing repercussions of the western neocolonialism and imperialism within the contemporary context of globalisation.

== Early life and career ==
LucFosther Diop was born in 1980 in Douala. After spending his young age having a very difficult relationship specially with his father, at the age of 17, he moved from the family house in Douala to his uncle's place in Bafoussam (West Region, Cameroon) where he got his diploma of secondary studies in 2000. He then went to study fine arts in Yaoundé where he earned a Bachelor of Arts degree at the University of Yaoundé I in 2003. After obtaining a grant from the Dutch Ministry of Foreign Affairs in 2009, he studied for two years at the Rijksakademie van beeldende kunsten in Amsterdam, Netherlands.

He is the first artist to benefit from a residency grant at ArtBakery (Bonendale, Douala, Cameroon) in 2003, at the MTN Cameroon Foundation (Douala) in 2007 and a digital arts research and production Unesco-Aschberg award for French Africa in 2013.

Diop exhibited his work during the 3rd OK Video International Festival, National Gallery of Indonesia in Jakarta (2007), World One Minute Video, Today Art Museum in Beijing (2008), 2nd Thessaloniki Biennial (2009), International Symposium on Electronic Arts (ISEA) 2010, PHotoEspaña (2011), the Havana biennial (2012) and the 18th International Contemporary Art Festival SESC_Videobrasil, 2013.

== Work ==
LucFosther Diop started making drawing on the free spaces of his books at the primary school like a hobby. His difficult familial atmosphere develops in him a strong solitary attitudes. He did not really got the feeling to play like other kids and was spending his time on trying to reproduce the images around. After he got the financial support of the Director of his secondary school in 1993, he bought colours, brushes and other tools for beginners. Then started making portraits, flowers and landscape in a very realistic ways. LucFosther represented his school and university many times in artistic competitions between 1995 and 2003. He really started getting in touch with film tools at the ArtBakery where he learned a lot about contemporary art and began to develop his process as an artist. Today, favouring a poetic point of view, LucFosther Diop is developing a research project on neocolonialism and imperialism, and their social, political, cultural, historical, geographic, economic and urban influences and repercussions. This research is essentially based on digital and media experimentation through photography, collage, drawing, video, ephemeral interventions, video performances, recycled documents and files found on the web and diversion of their content's meaning. He is calling these works "virtual made" or ''neo ready made'' and really enjoy the works by Marcel Duchamp, Alfredo Jaar, Olga Kisseleva, William Kentridge, Mona Hatoum, Pascal Kenfack, Goddy Leye, Bob Marley, Fela Kuti, Youssou Ndour and Richard Bona. LucFosther Diop is one of the artists presented in the documentary OF AMSTERDAM directed by Catarina Neves Ricci in 2012.

== Selected projects/exhibitions ==
- 'The Southern Panoramas International Contemporary Art', São Paulo, Brazil, 18th International Contemporary Art Festival SESC_Videobrasil, 2013
- 'Sanaa ya Makaratasi – African Paper Art: Process, Substance and Environment', Nairobi National Museum, Nairobi, 2012
- 'Art Practices and Social Imaginaries', 11 Havana biennial, Havana, 2012
- 'Face Contact. Portrait and Communication', Iberia Art Center, Beijing, 2012
- 'Face Contact. Portrait and Communication', Teatro Fernán Gómez, PHotoEspaña-International Photography and Visual Arts Festival, Madrid, 2011
- 'Modernité + Résistances/Aux souffles du Monde', 3rd World Festival of Black Arts, Dakar, 2010
- 'A Media Lab in Africa', 16th International Symposium on Electronic Art (ISEA), Dortmund, Essen, Duisburg, 2010
- 'Ceci produit Cela', Espace Doual'art, Douala, Cameroon, 2010
- 'Open Studio 2010', Rijksakademie Van Beeldende Kunsten, Amsterdam, 2010
- 'Open Studio 2009', Rijksakademie Van Beeldende Kunsten, Amsterdam, 2009
- 'Identity:Imagined State', Centre for Contemporary Art, Lagos, 2009
- 'Premier Festival International d' Art Contemporain', Museum of Modern Art of Algiers, Algeria, 2009
- 'Traits Complices', Galerie Beatrice Binoche, Saint Denis-La Reunion, 2009
- 'Ongekeng Young masters@action', Hendrikkade 33, Amsterdam, 2009
- '2nd Thessaloniki Biennial of Contemporary Art', State Museum of Contemporary Art, Thessaloniki, 2009
- 'The World One Minutes Videos', Today Art Museum, Beijing, 2008
- '3rd Jakarta International Video Festival', National Gallery of Indonesia, Jakarta, 2007
- 'Art Convention', Signature Gallery, Douala, 2005
- 'Exit', Espace Doual'art, Douala, Cameroon, 2004
- 'Aesthetic of the Reduced Form', Goethe-Institut, Yaoundé, 2001
- 'Portes ouvertes', Espace Doual'art, Douala, Cameroon, 2000

== Selected films/videos ==
- 'Around and Around', HD, 6', 2005–2014.
- 'Game of Hope', HD, 4'54", 2007–2014.
- 'Inner Transition', HD, 1', 2007–2014.
- 'From the shadow ship to the sky ship', HD, 2013.
- 'Oops-sessions', HD, 2013.
- 'Vitruvian World', HD, 1', 2010.
- 'Flying Hand Flags', HD, 2'23", 2010.
- 'We are One', HD, 5'38", 2009–2010.
- 'Attitudes', HD, 5'10", 2009–2010.
- 'Ma Danse Bafia', HD, 1', 2007.
- 'Introversion', HD, 2'52", 2007.

== Awards ==
- FAAP Residency Award, The Southern Panoramas International Contemporary Art, 18th International Contemporary Art Festival SESC_Videobrasil, 2013.
- UNESCO/Aschberg Award, CALQ and Ville de Québec Grant, LA CHAMBRE BLANCHE, Quebec City, 2013.
- Rijksakademie Residency Scholarship, Dutch Ministry of Foreign Affairs (ICE), Amsterdam, NL, 2010.
- Rijksakademie Residency Scholarship, Dutch Ministry of Foreign Affairs /DCO/IC, Amsterdam, NL, 2009.
- MTNC Foundation Residency Grant, MTNC Foundation, Douala, Cameroon, 2007.
- EXITOUR Travel Grant, Art Moves Africa, Brussels, Belgium, 2006.
- Portfolio Program Residency Grant, ArtBakery, Douala, Cameroon, 2003.
- UNIFAC Third Prize(Painting), University Festival of Arts and Culture, Buea, Cameroon, 2002.
- FOMARIC First Prize(Painting), Foire Musicale Artistique Industrielle et Commerciale, Douala, Cameroon, 1997.
- FOMARIC Second Prize(Painting), Foire Musicale Artistique Industrielle et Commerciale, Douala, Cameroon, 1996.
