= Danièle Diwouta-Kotto =

Cameroonian designer and architect

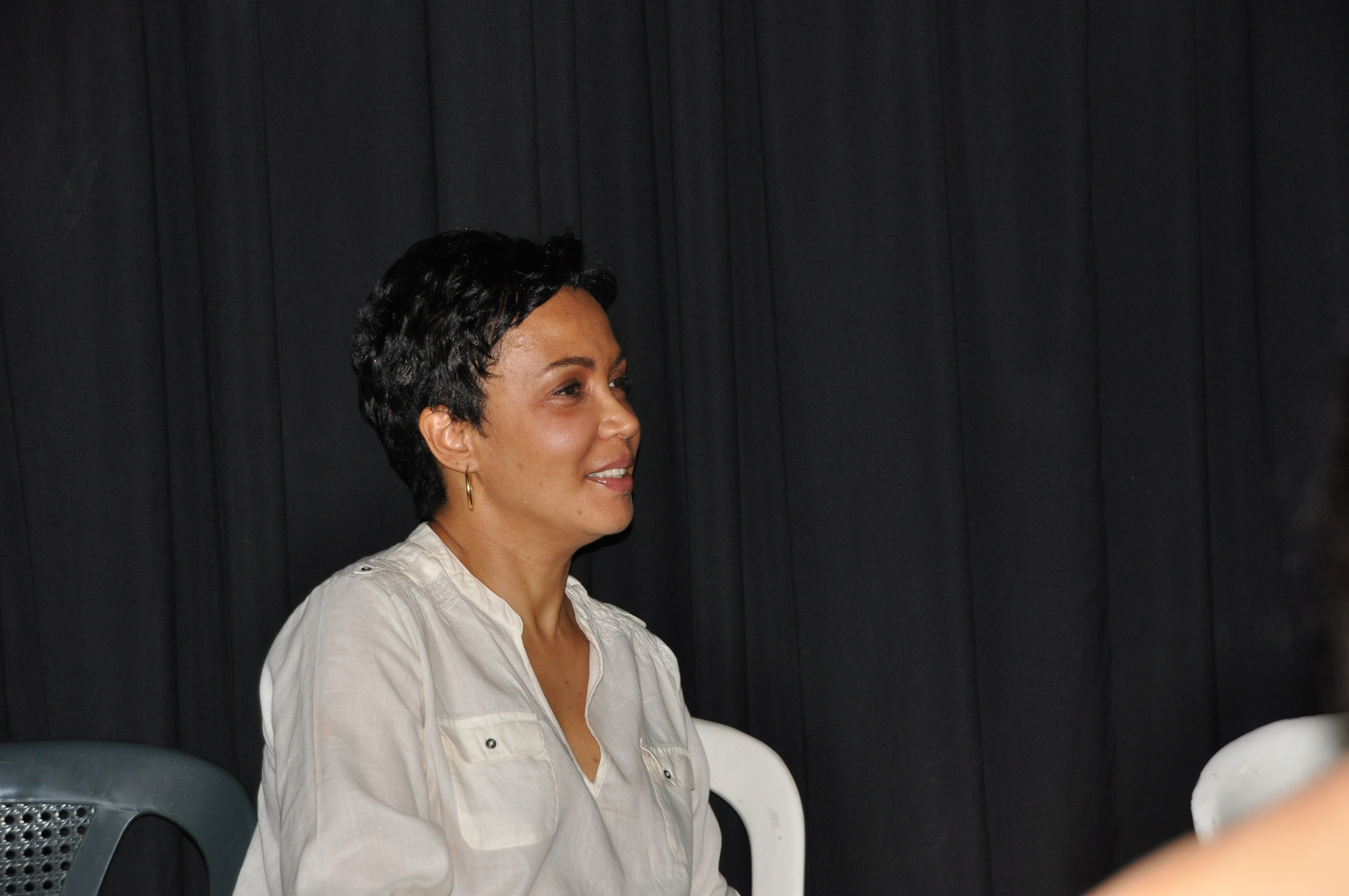
- Danièle Diwouta-Kotto in 2011
- Born: 1960 (age 65–66); Yaoundé, Cameroon
- Style: designer and architect

Danièle Diwouta-Kotto (born in 1960), is a Cameroonian designer and architect, member of the Cameroon architects association (ONAC) and founder of the V.A.A. Villes et Architectures d'Afrique organization.

== Biography ==
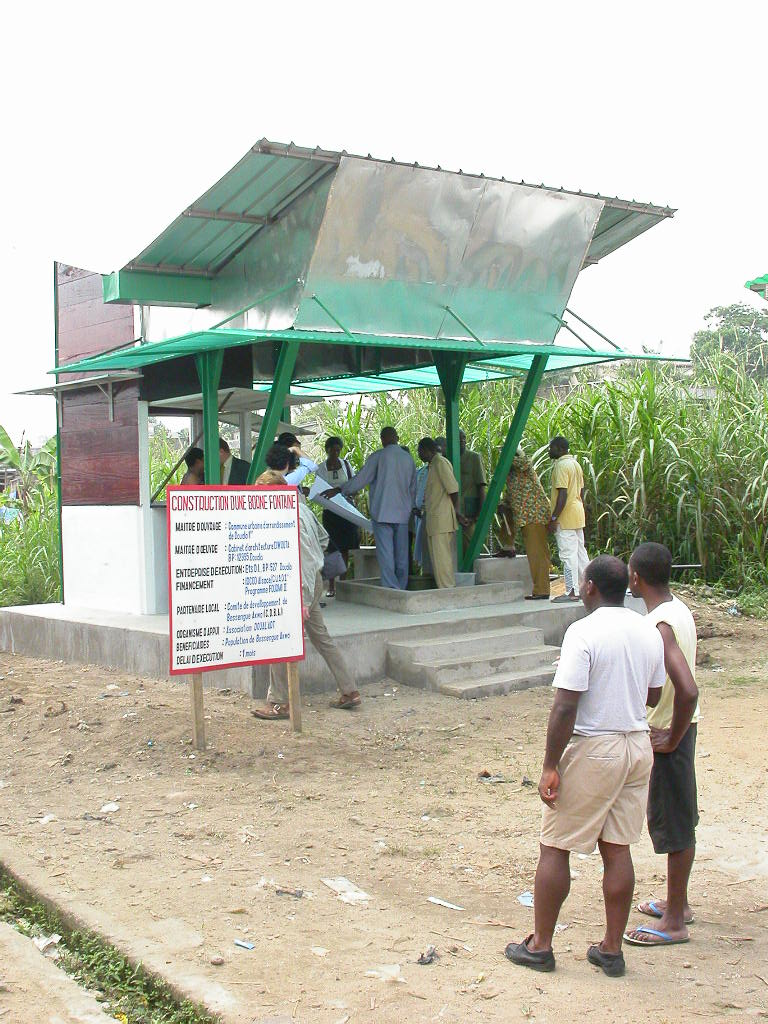
Kiosque à eau, borne-fontaine in Douala in 2003.

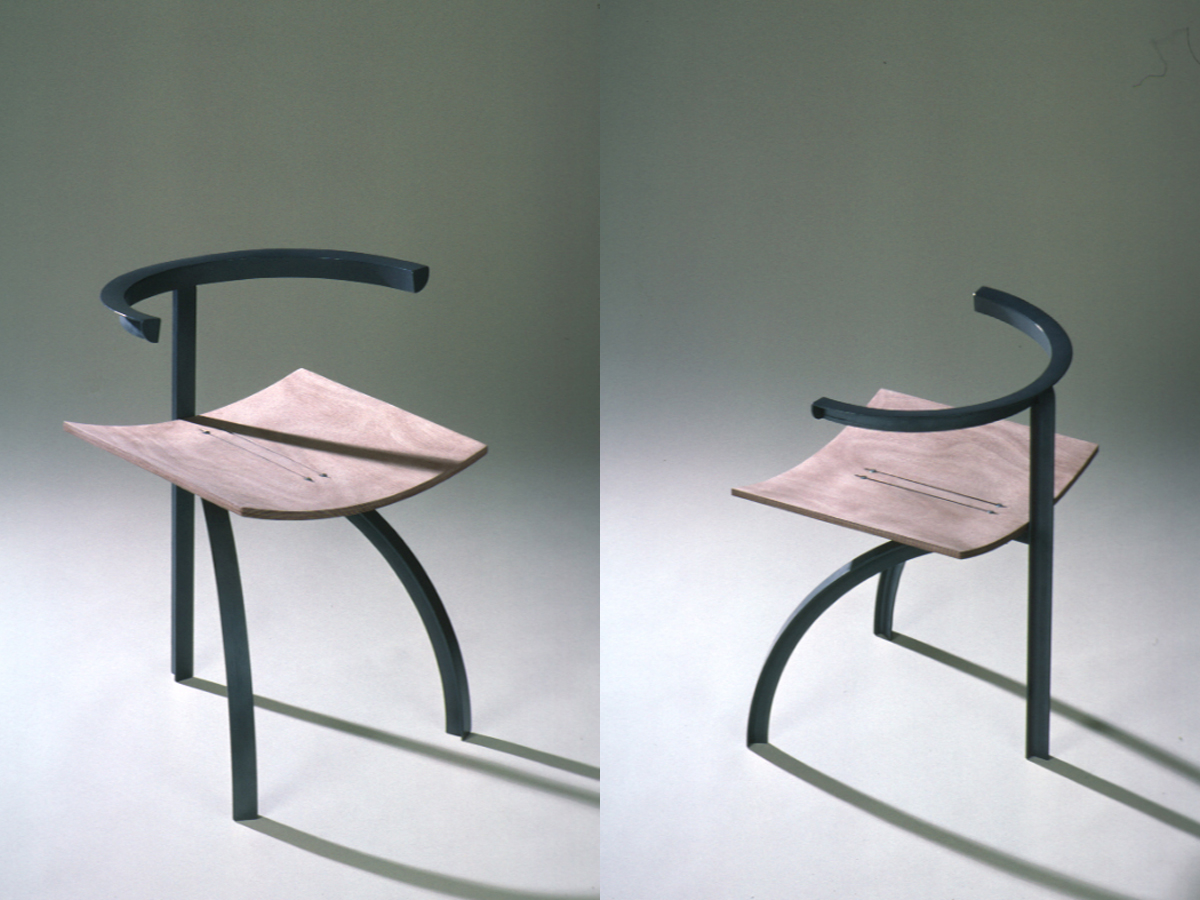
pat'a mambo, 1999–2000 par Sandrine Dole.

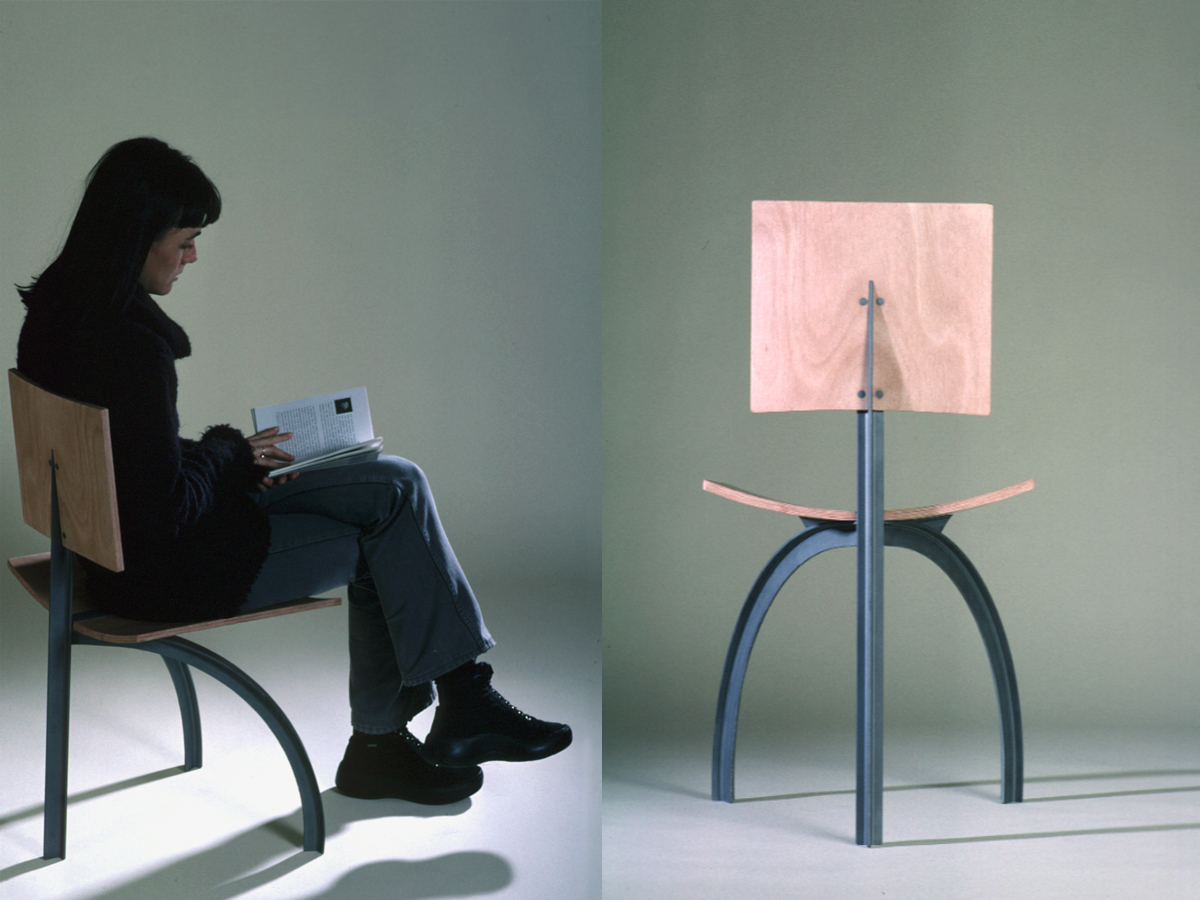
pat'a mambo, 1999–2000.

Born in Cameroon, Danièle Diwouta-Kotto studied architecture and graduated in 1986 in France, at the Ecole d'architecture Paris-Villemin. In the same year, she created her own society Passerelle Sud and, in 1989, the architecture firm AGG Cabinet d'Architecture Diwouta. Her attention towards history, architectural heritage, environment, climate change and urban transformation in Cameroon and in other African cities have brought Danièle Diwouta-Kotto to realizing the publication Suites architecturales: Kinshasa, Douala, Dakar, published in 2010 as the first volume of the D'architectures & d'Afrique series. The realization of this publication started in 2003 and is based on a research concerning African colonial buildings and the different ways in which this kind of architecture has been transformed and re-elaborated.

In 2003 she produces the Kiosque à eau (water kiosk) in Douala's neighborhood Bessengue, commissioned by doual'art. This small building is conceived as a public fountain where people can buy both water and food. Its canopy in particular, goes back to Jesus Palomino's construction, realized within the Bessengue City workshop, organized by Goddy Leye and ArtBakery art center.

Between 1993 and 1994 her design work is shown at Salon MIC in Paris and Los Angeles; in 1995 she takes part at the collective exhibition Around and Around, promoted by doual'art. Her work is presented, amongst others, at the itinerant exhibition Designers Africains d'Aujourd'hui and at Dak’Art. In April 2001, she participates to the Havana Biennial.

Danièle Diwouta-Kotto plays an important role in the reflection on African design, architecture and urban development and also on the relation between art and urban transformations. In April 2003, she takes part in the Architecture et Développement durable (Architecture and Sustainable Development) conferences promoted by the French Cultural Centre of Douala, and in March 2005 she is at the convention Femmes Bâtisseuses at UNESCO in Paris. In January 2005 she takes part at the Ars&Ubis symposium promoted by doual'art as an introduction to the SUD 2007. In 2008, she participates at the seminar APERAU in Lomé, Togo, about Urbanisation en Afrique: Permanence et ruptures (Urbanisation in Africa: permanence and breakage). In 2010 she takes part at doual'art's exhibition L'Afrique Visionnaire-GEO-Graphics in Brussels.

Danièle Diwouta-Kotto is presented in the magazine Revue Noire, in the article number 13 in 1993; in November 2001, she is considered as one of the 100 people who make Cameroon move.

== Bibliography ==
- Diwouta-Kotto (photo- graphisme Sandrine Dole), Suites architecturales à l'intérieur: Kinshasa, Douala, Dakar, Edition VAA, 2010.
- Diwouta-Kotto, D. (2011). Douala: Intertwined Architectures in ArchiAfrica. Available at:
- Diwouta-Kotto, Danièle (2010): Suites architecturales: Kinshasa, Douala, Dakar. Épinal: Association VAA, p. 42.
- IAM – Intense Art Magazine. (2014). Danièle Diwouta-Kotto, une architecte au long cours in IAM#01 CAMEROUN | CAMEROON, p. 020. Available at: (Accessed 28 Nov. 2016).
- Pensa, Iolanda (Ed.) 2017. Public Art in Africa. Art et transformations urbaines à Douala /// Art and Urban Transformations in Douala. Genève: Metis Presses. ISBN 978-2-94-0563-16-6

=== See also ===
- List of public art in Douala
- Palace of the Kings Bell
