= Ginette Daleu =

Cameroonian artist (1977–2018)

Ginette Daleu Ginette Flore Daleu
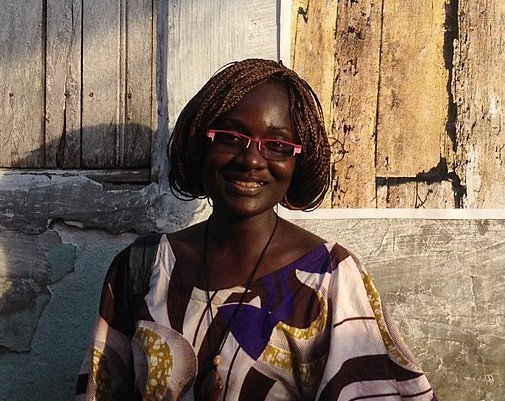
- Born: 23 September 1977; Metet, Cameroon
- Died: 9 November 2018 (aged 41)
- Known for: Collage

Ginette Daleu (born 23 September 1977; died 9 November 2018) was an artist from Cameroon.

== Biography ==
Ginette Flore Daleu was born in 1977 at Metet in Cameroon. She had a degree from the Institut de Formation Artistique in Mbalmayo and graduated in 2000. She also attended the Libera Accademia di Belle Arti in Brescia in Italy. Daleu had created art from a young age and knew she wanted to be an artist, against the wishes of her family.

Daleu died at her home in Senegal on 9 November 2018, following an illness.

== Career ==
In 2006, Daleu was part of a collective of artists who travelled from Douala to Dak'art, exploring how to revitalise art education in Cameroon along the way. This project was called Exit Tour and the group travelled overland, meeting people and working with artists and students along the way. This trip came out of work at ArtBakery, an organisation to encourage artists in Cameroon. Working with and within communities became an important part of Daleu's practice.

For Daleu, involvement with ArtBakery changed her practice from working on decorative art to exploring the aesthetics of imperfect places like Bessengué City. Sometimes her work was drawn directly to the walls of the spaces she was exploring. This led to collage and photography becoming hallmarks of Daleu's artistic practice. A residency at the Rijksakademie in Amsterdam produced work with attempted to "unpeel the skin of things". Her work has been exhibited in Germany, in Switzerland, and in Italy.

The World Bank sponsored an exhibition of work by Cameroonian artists in 2014, and Daleu was one of those featured. She produced a new series entitled Architextures urbaines et Les introuvables. The work "Les introuvables" is a series of 8 photos printed on canvas that has been exhibited during the forth edition of SUD Salon Urbain de Douala in 2017.

In 2018, Daleu was one of the artists commissioned by Videoart at Midnight festival of video art in Berlin. The artist Antje Majewski collaborated with Daleu on a new installation called Le Trône, where video and painting explore German colonial legacies in the Cameroon. She also exhibited at Dak'art in 2018.

== Gallery ==
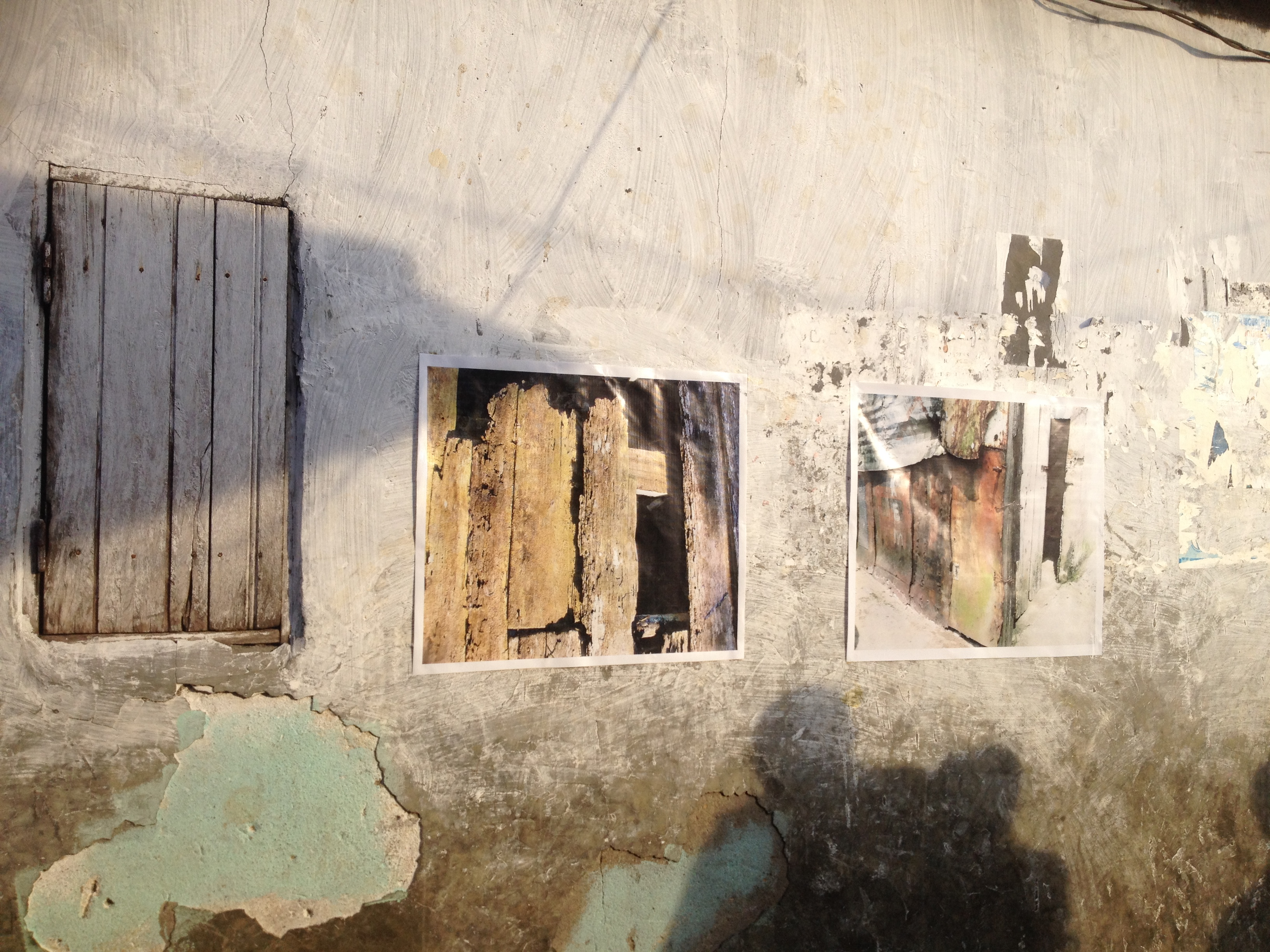
Daleu's 2013 Exhibition

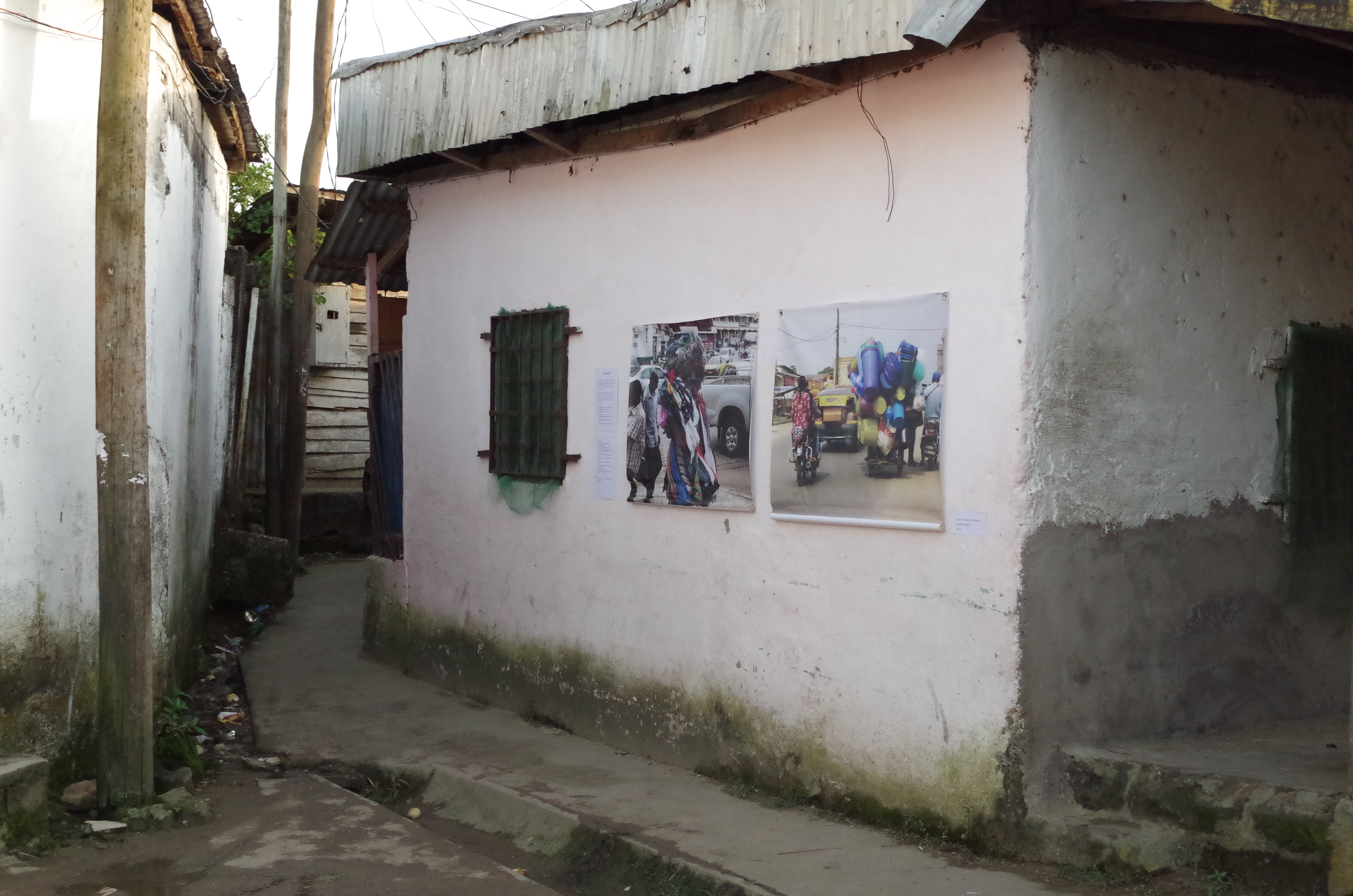
2013 Exhibition

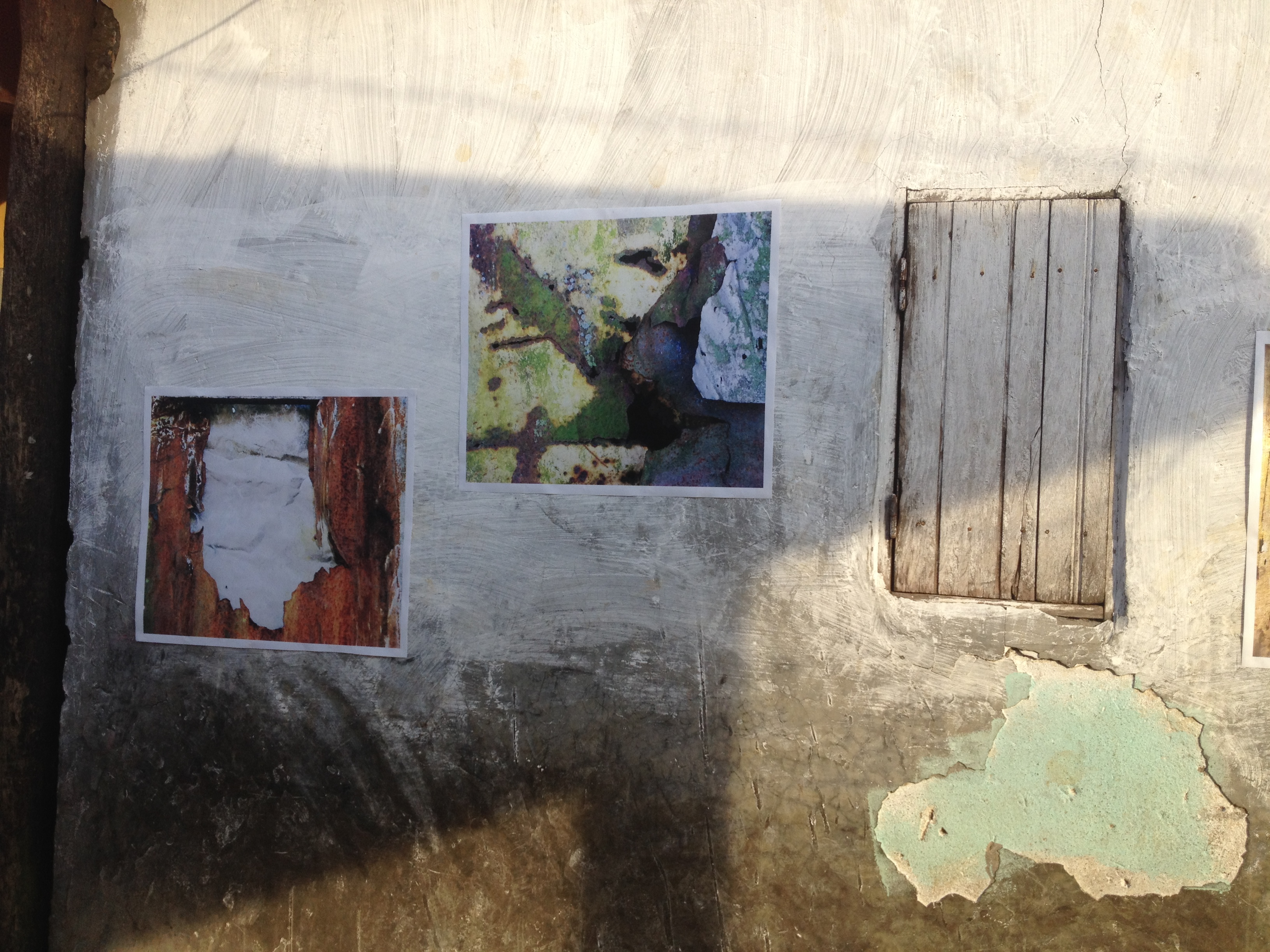
2013 Exhibition

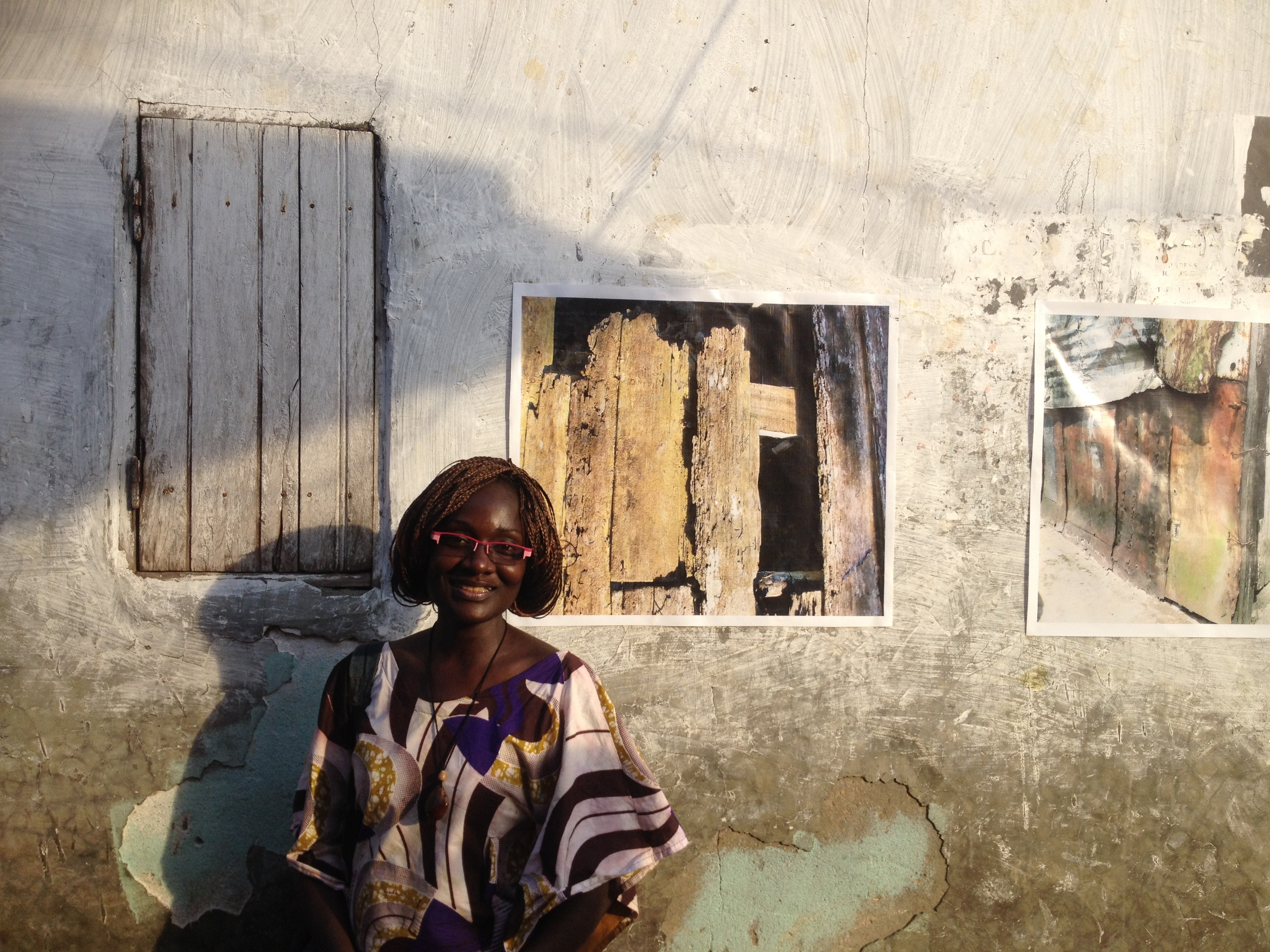
Daleu, 2013

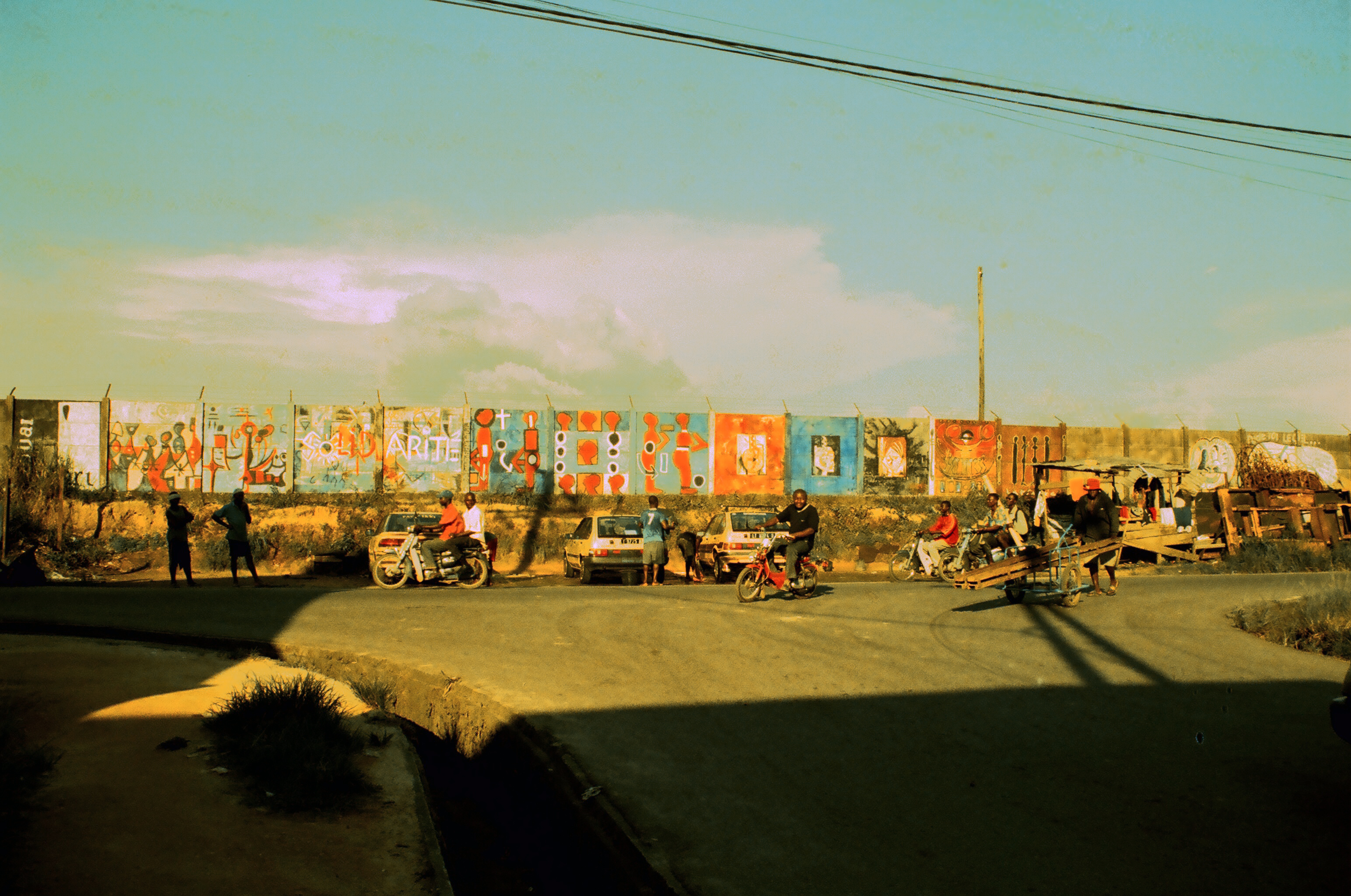
Bessengue City

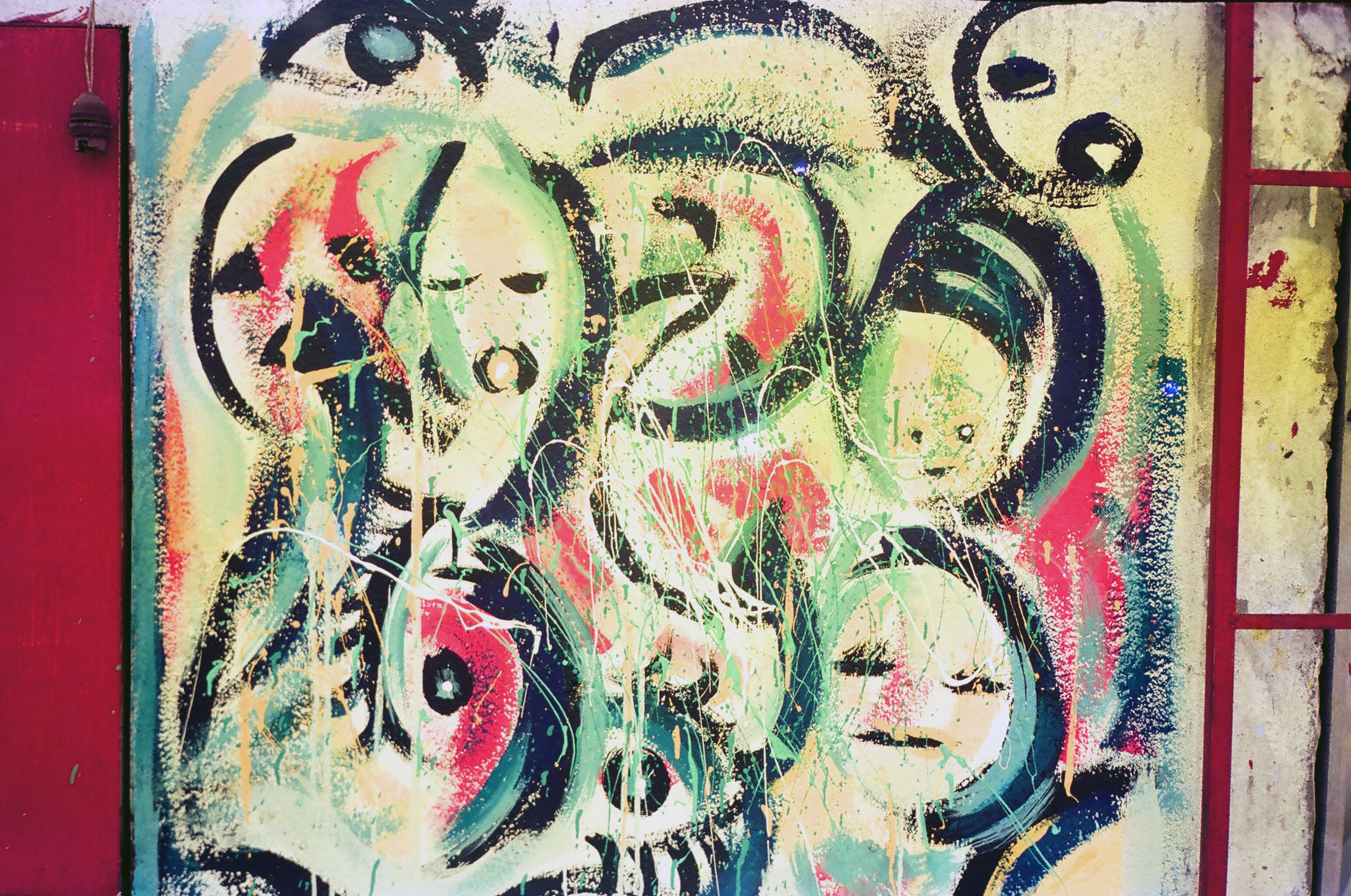
Urban Scenes, Douala
