= Borne Fontaine =

Fountain in Douala, Cameroon

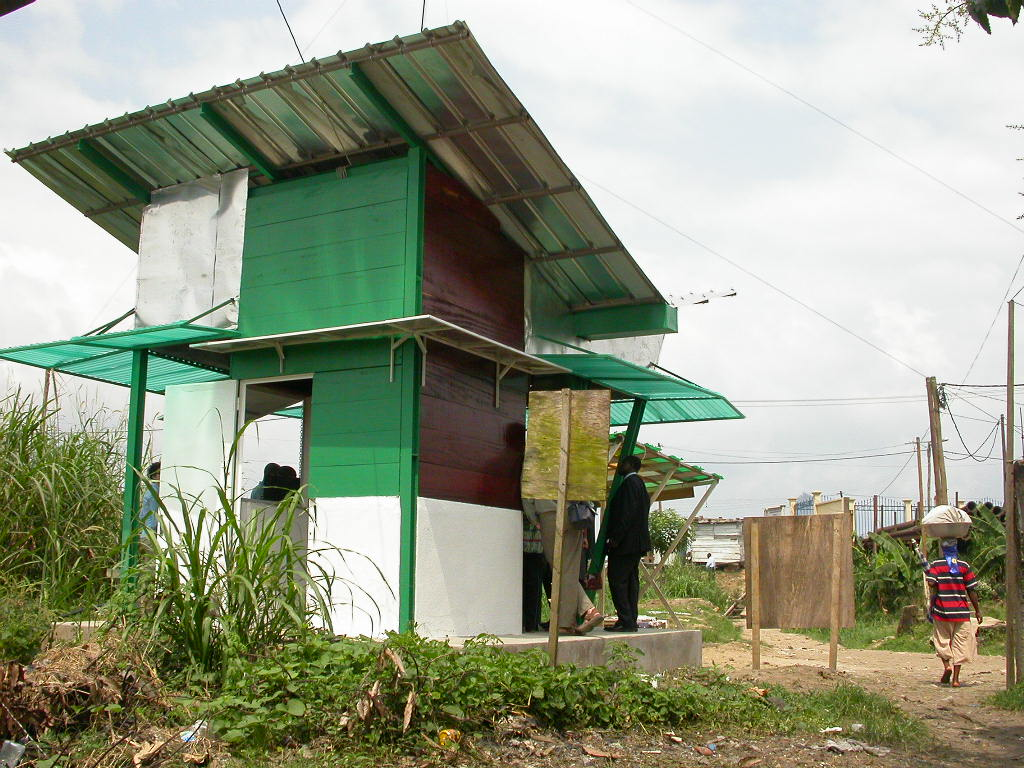
- Artist: Danièle Diwouta-Kotto
- Year: 2003
- Medium: Building
- Dimensions: 6 m × 3 m × 4 m (240 in × 120 in × 160 in)
- Location: Vallée Bessengue, Bessengue Akwa Douala, Cameroon; 4.054601°N 9.707102°E
- Owner: Municipality of Douala

Borne Fontaine (or Kiosque à eau) is a permanent fountain, from artist Danièle Diwouta-Kotto, inaugurated in 2003. It is located in Douala (Cameroon).

== The artwork ==
Borne Fontaine is a public artwork in Douala (Cameroon. Its creation was commissioned by Doual'art, produced by Danièle Diwouta-Kotto, then offered to the Douala Municipality. It was inaugurated in 2003 during the SUD - Salon Urbain de Douala 2007. It is an artwork of 3 by 4 meters, with a height of 6 meters.

Before its construction, Danièle Diwouta-Kotto, an architect whose firm secured the prime contractor, had had several conversations with the community. During these exchanges, the architect had invited people to imagine what might look like a fire hydrant ideal.

The people of Bessengu-Akwa wanted a framework that would be a meeting point, would offer an attractive sight and would also provide water. Following the interviews, the architect has made several proposals and people chose the model that corresponded most to their expectations.

This small building was therefore conceived as a public and paying fountain, as well as a food outlet. In particular, the roof reflects the style of the ephemeral building, created by the artist Jesús Palomino, in the workshop Bessengue City organized by Goddy Leye and theart center ArtBakery.

It is restored in 2013, the walls being repainted.

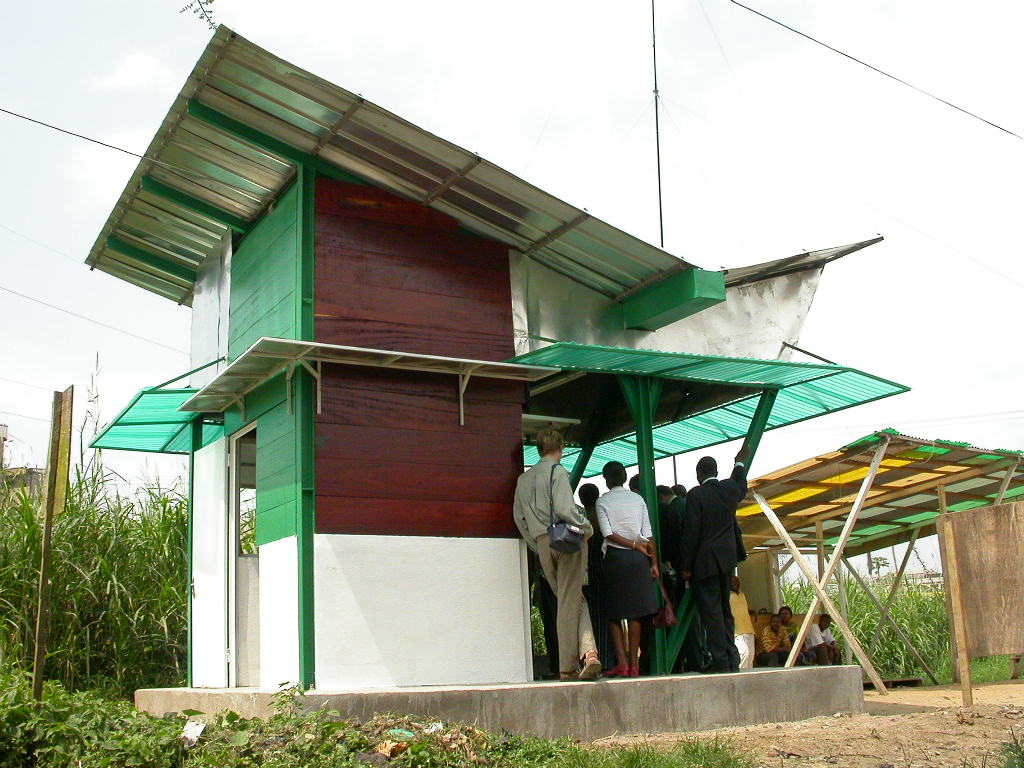

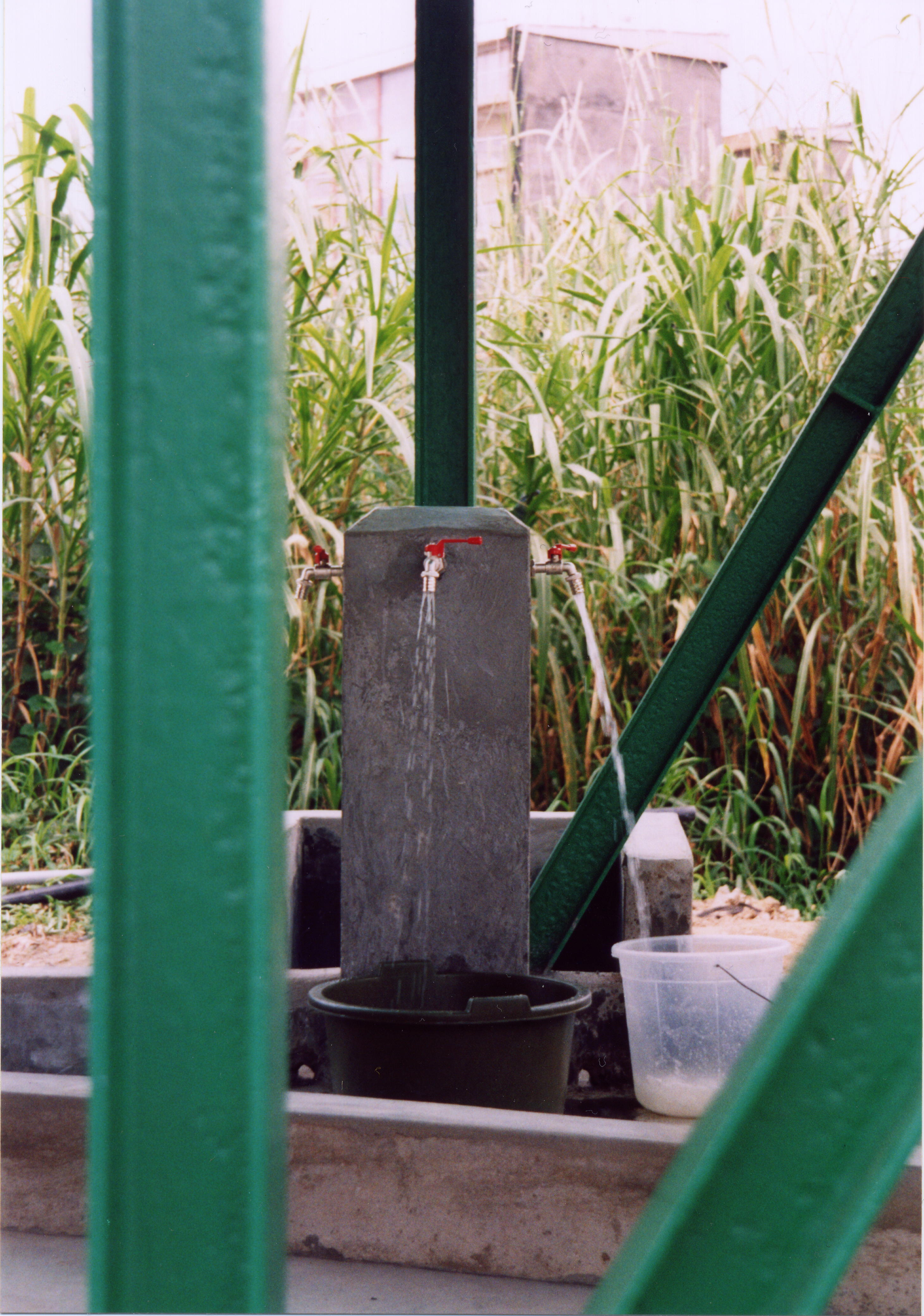

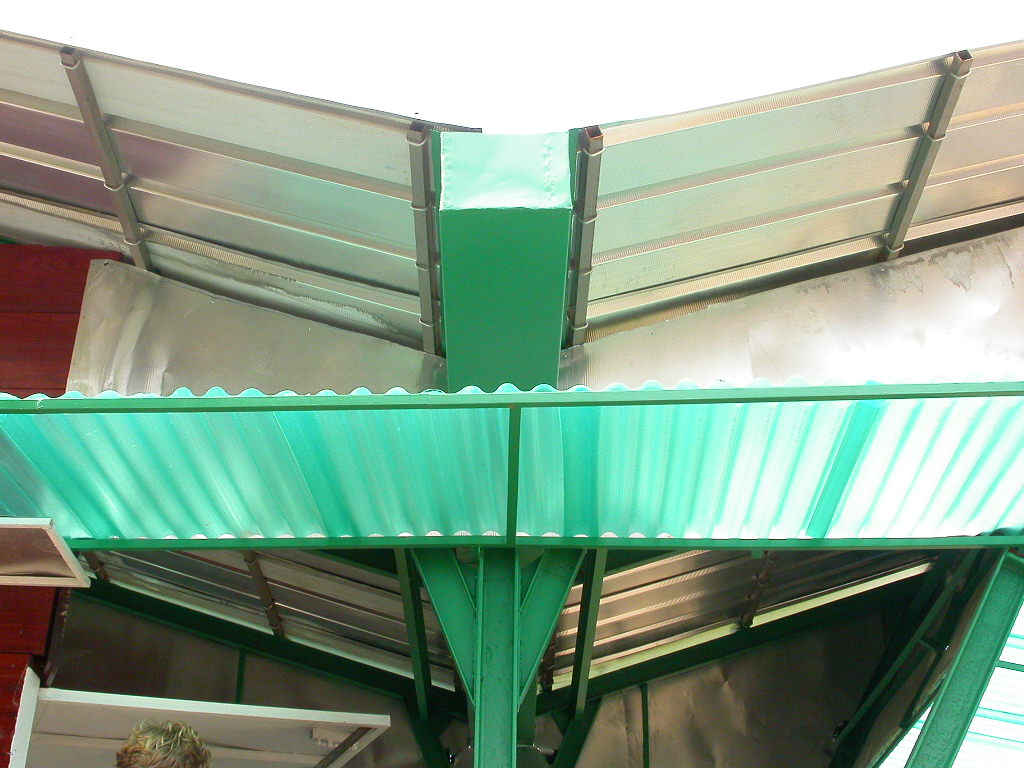

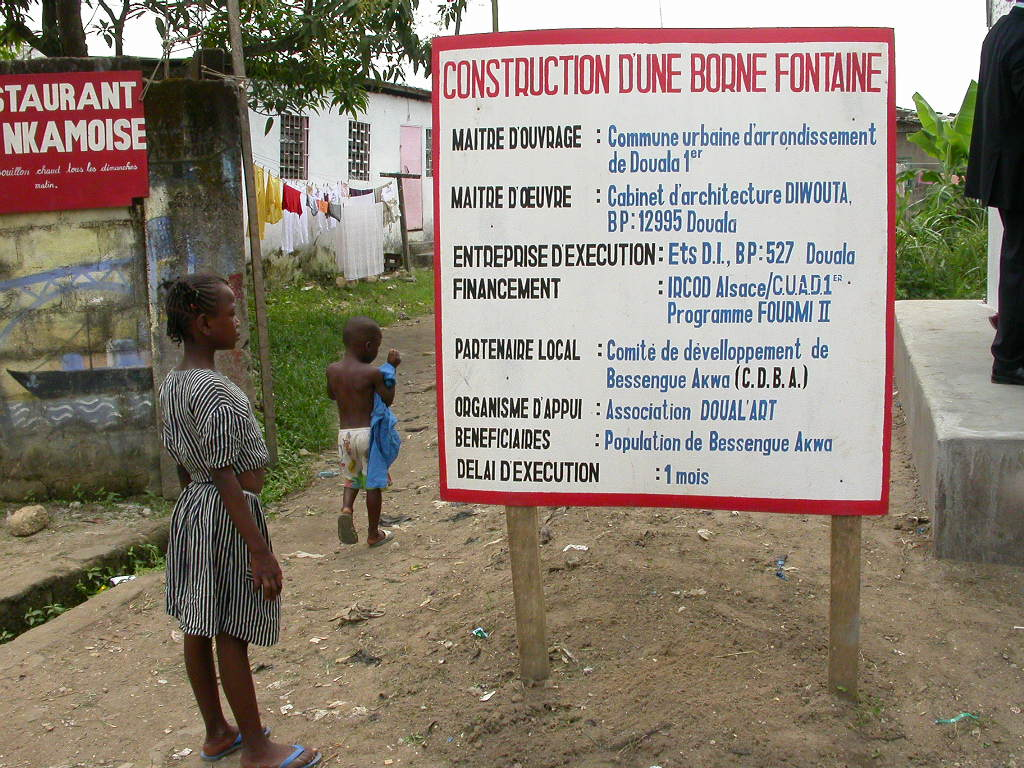

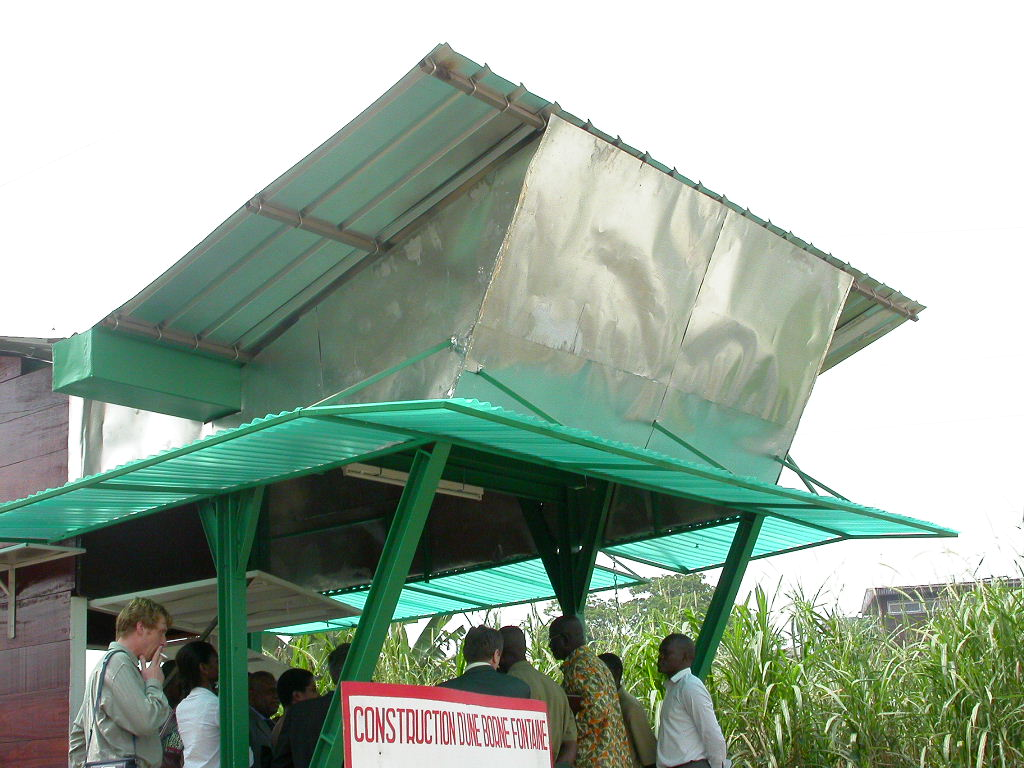

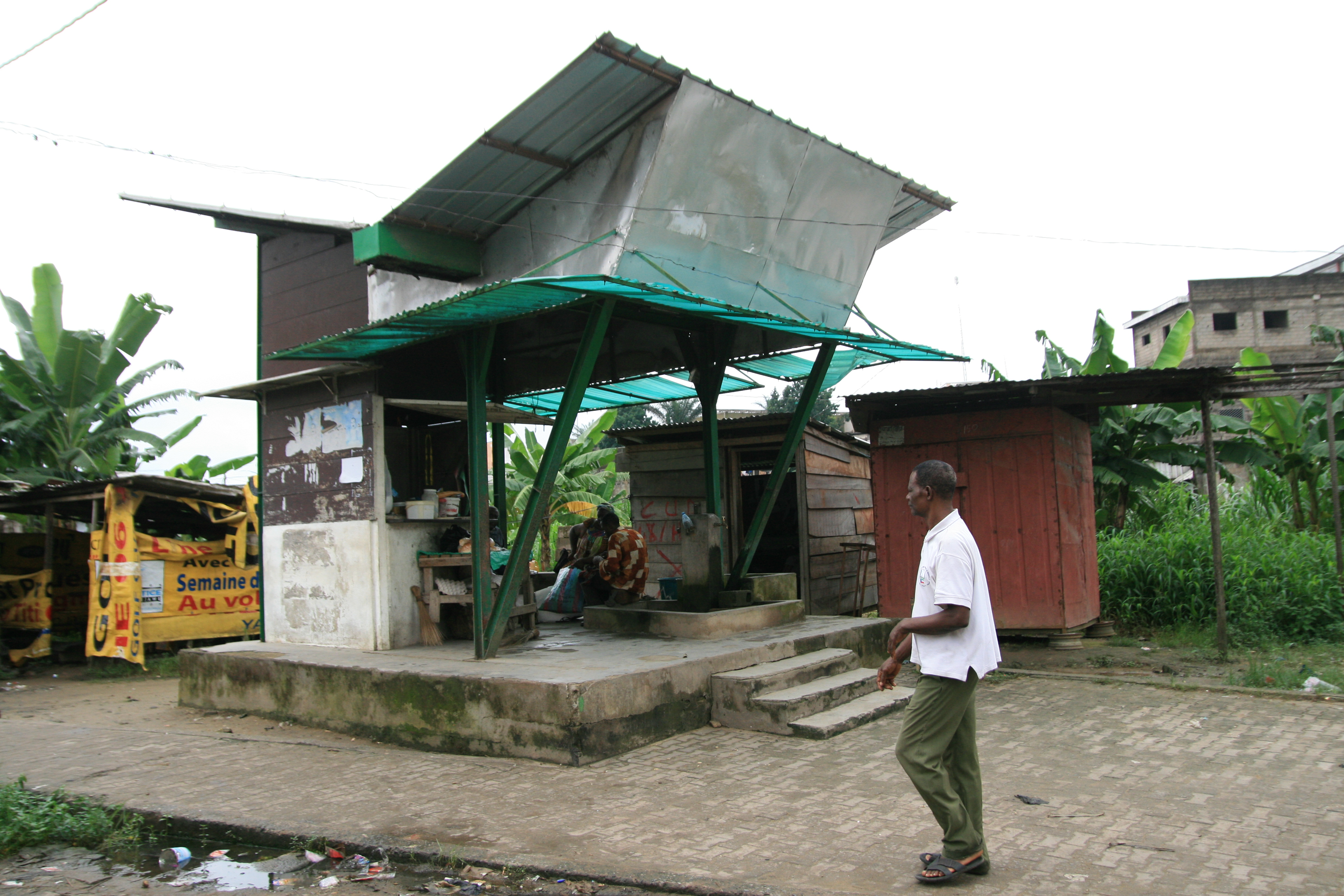

== See also ==
=== Bibliographie ===
- Pensa, Iolanda (Ed.) 2017. Public Art in Africa. Art et transformations urbaines à Douala /// Art and Urban Transformations in Douala. Genève: Metis Presses. ISBN 978-2-94-0563-16-6
- Babina, L., and Douala Bell, M. (eds.). (2007): Douala in Translation. A View of the City and Its Creative Transformative Potentials, Rotterdam, Episode Publishers.
- Pucciarelli, M. (2015). «Culture and Safety in Douala: The Cases of New Bell and Bessengue », in Bonini Lessing, E. (ed.), Urban Safety and Security, Franco Angeli, pp- 69-79.
- Verschuren, K., X. Nibbeling and L. Grandin. (2012): Making Douala 2007-2103, Rotterdam, ICU art project.
- Kaze, R. and Tchakam, S. (2009): «Bessengué Akwa. L’institution communale démissionne». In Liquid n°03, (Juillet - Août - Septembre 2009).
- Marta Pucciarelli (2014) Final Report. University of Applied Sciences and Arts of Southern Switzerland, Laboratory of visual culture.

=== Related articles ===
- List of public art in Douala
- Contemporary African art
