= Pascal Kenfack =

Cameroonian painter and sculptor (born 1950)

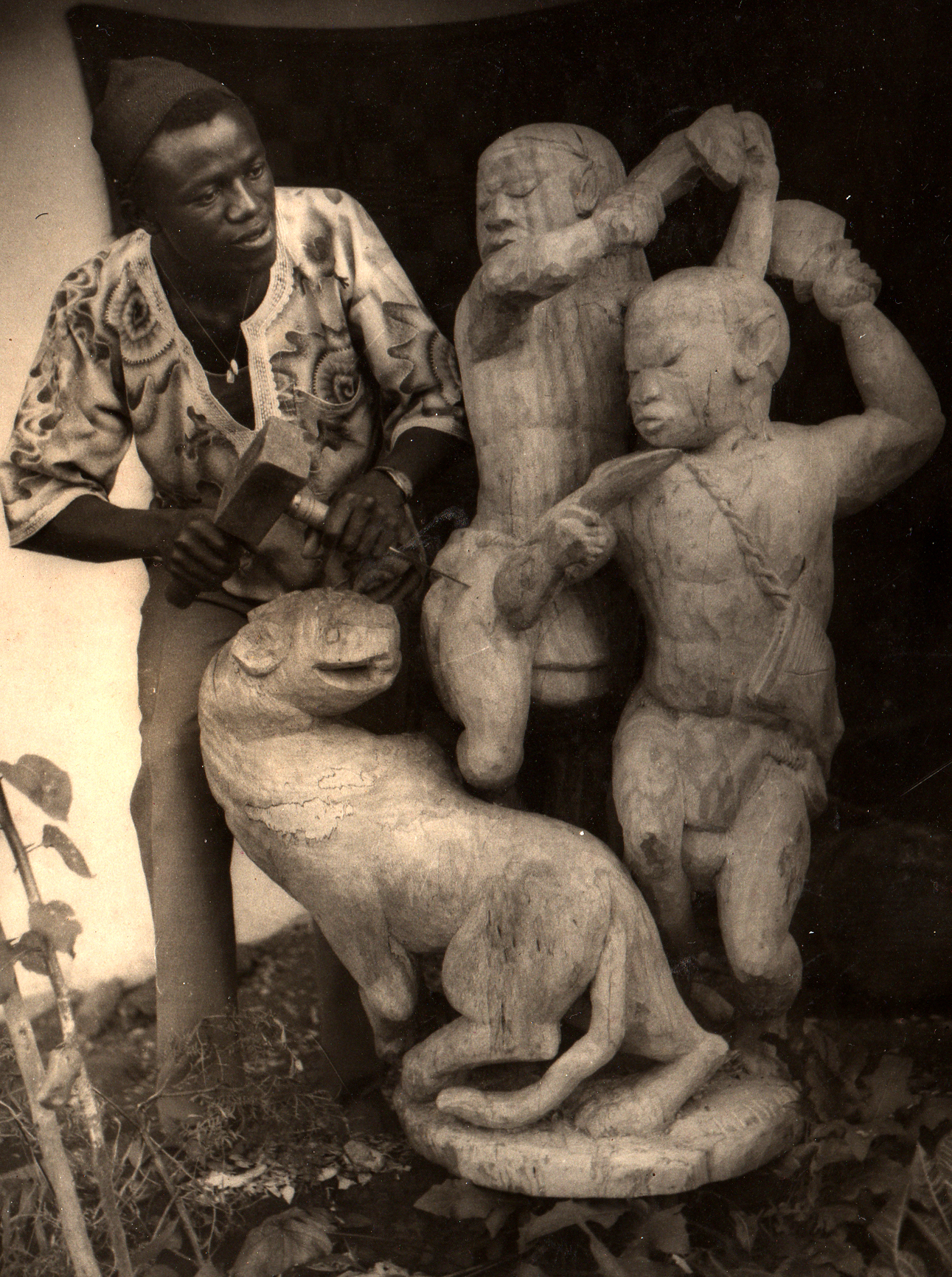
- Sculptor Pascal Kenfack at work
- Born: 1950; Dschang, Cameroon
- Known for: Painting, Sculpture, Plastic arts

Pascal Kenfack (born 1950, Dschang, Cameroon) is a painter and sculptor. Passionately committed to the revival of art living in Cameroon, he took action by creating a hybrid of a museum and a school in Yaoundé, already a workshop for learning and creation.

== Biography ==
Interested in art at an early age, Pascal Kenfack decided to begin his artistic training at the end of which he obtained in 1975 the degree in History of Art from the École Nationale des Beaux-Arts of Paris. Then he continued his studies for a PhD in Fine Arts at the University of Paris VIII ten years later. Today, he is credited with more than 600 paintings and sculptures, most of which have been exhibited around the world: Cameroon, Senegal, Gabon, Cuba, France, Denmark, South Korea, and Canada. His commitment to young people is particularly illustrated by art training courses that he animates since 1992 in Yaoundé as part of the project "Culture de quartier" (District's culture). Between 1987 and 2005, he was Research Fellow in History of Art at the Institute of Human Science in Yaoundé and lecturer at the University of Yaoundé I in the Department of Art and Archaeology. He has also taught at the Institute of Artistic Education in Mbalmayo, then at the Institute of Fine Arts in Foumban. Today, there are more than 200 students he trained in painting, sculpture and art history.

== Context ==
Until 1992, there was no art school in Cameroon which raises question whether the government did not totally lost interest in this sector. Indeed, the Institute of Artistic Training of Mbalmayo depends on private Catholic schools. Its goal is to educate the art, acting like an expression of the culture of a people and a nation. It is without doubt by ripple effect that in 1993, the University of Yaoundé I opened a section for Visual Arts and Art History. Then in 2009, the University of Dschang and the University of Douala have each opened an Institute of Fine Arts, respectively to Foumban and Nkongsamba. Meanwhile, other projects from private individuals emerged as the center for contemporary art Doual'art in Douala, proposes to invite artists to exhibit works of art in different areas of the city and project that painter and sculptor Pascal Kenfack feeds for a few years to build a veritable city of the arts in the outskirts of Yaoundé. A museum-school, as he calls it, which continues to gush from the ground like a mushroom. Both workshop meeting place and training or rather confrontation, the imaginary city of Kenfack intends to become a total art space. It is in this workshop that some artists such as Goddy Leye, Louis Epée and Emile Youmbi, now internationally recognized, have completed their training.

== Methodology ==
Pascal Kenfack developed an artistic methodology based on semiotics - the use and interpretation of symbols: "The theoretical thinking blocks imagination and free expression if, at the same time, we do not take the risk of throwing signs, colors and pencil marks on paper that becomes a memory to explore more distant horizon imagination." After choosing a theme, the artist uses signs and symbols to represent the imaginary back in terms of artistic creation. Ideas are represented in the form of images and colors. Thus, the art establishes the relationship between idea and image. As for the theme, it is an intuitive stop of a wave of emotion, feelings or concerns that challenge the artist. For example, marriage, birth, death and education are topics often covered by Pascal Kenfack. In summary, this methodology gives value to imagination materialized in the form of thoughts, signs and paint.

=== Major exhibitions ===
- Container: Art Across Oceans, Copenhagen, Denmark, 1996.
- Dak'Art 1992, Dakar Biennale, Dakar, Senegal, 1992.
- Impression de Corée, City Hall, Yaoundé, Cameroon, 1989.
- Arts Olympiad, Seoul, South Korea, 1988.
- 2nd Havana Biennial, Havana, Cuba, 1986.
- Grand Palais, Paris, France, 1982.

=== Publications ===
- Pascal Kenfack, Expérience plastique inspirée du culte des ancêtres chez les sédentaires en pays Bamileke, thèse de 3e cycle de l'université Paris-VII, 1985.
- Pascal Kenfack, De l'art ancien à l'art contemporain au Cameroun, Actes du colloque Africréation, Paris, 1980.

== See also ==
- Goddy Leye
- Doual'art
- African art
- Plastic arts

== Bibliography ==
- Revue Noire, La création au Cameroun, (13), Paris, 1994.
- Nicole Guez, L'art africain contemporain, Paris, 1992.
- Pascal Kenfack, Impressions de Corée: exposition de peinture, Cameroun, 1989.
- Pascal Kenfack, Expériences plastique inspirée du culte des ancêtres chez les sédentaires en pays Bamiléké, Paris, 1985.
