= Videobrasil =

Cultural organization in Brazil

Associação Cultural Videobrasil (or simply Videobrasil) is an organization that hosts the International Electronic Art Festival in Brazil. The festival is hosted in São Paulo. The program has included installations, performances, VJs, CD-ROM art, and Internet art.

The Festival includes a competitive exhibition of southern circuit artwork. Art shows, debates, and meetings also take place.

Associação Cultural Videobrasil, established in 1991 by Solange Farkas, is a reference center for electronic art in Brazil, as well as a center for international interchange among artists, curators, and theoreticians. The Videobrasil collection features nearly four thousand pieces of electronic art.
