= Institut de Formation Artistique =

Art school in Mbalmayo, Cameroon

The Institut de Formation Artistique is an art school in Mbalmayo, Cameroon. The institution was established in 1992.
