= ArtBakery =

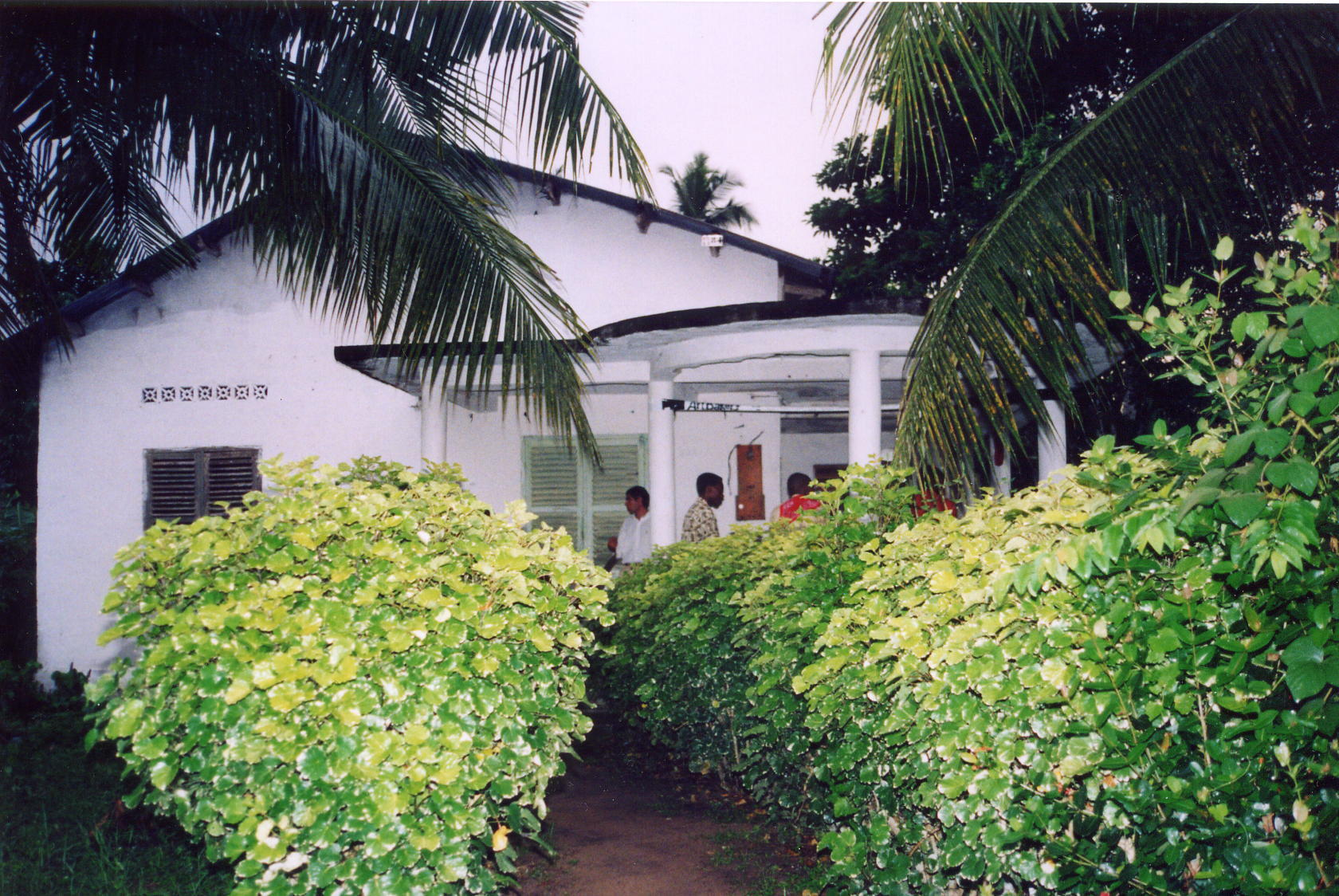
- Established: 2002
- Location: Bonendale, Cameroon
- Type: Contemporary Art
- Director: Goddy Leye

ArtBakery is an art centre based in the village of Bonendale a few kilometers from Douala and founded by Goddy Leye. The centre offers trainings for emerging artists (Master Class), journalists (Art Daily) and residency programs for young artists (Portfolio). ArtBakery is specifically designed to technically support the production of multimedia artworks, video and digital art.

== History ==
ArtBakery is founded in 2002 after the artist Goddy Leye moves back to Cameroon from the Netherlands. The centre is part of the Rijksakademie International Network (RAIN), a network of artists who support contemporary cultural practices in their countries of origin. RAIN supports ArtBakery and its first project Bessengue City.

== Activities ==
=== Bessengue City ===
Bessengue City is a project designed and coordinated by Goddy Leye and organised in Bessengue Douala in October 2002. The project involved the artists James Beckett, Goddy Leye, Hartanto, Jesus Palomino and the local community and it was produced with the support of Rijksakademie van Beeldende Kunsten of Amsterdam and by the programme R.A.I.N. Rain Artists’ Initiative Network. James Beckett produces in the neighbourhood of Bessengue an experimental radio, with a range of one kilometre and the collaboration of a group of young people which made interviews and recordings. The radio was called Radio Bessengue City, or Dikalo la Bessengue (the messenger of Bessengue) becomes, as one listener said, “the radio of the people by the people”.

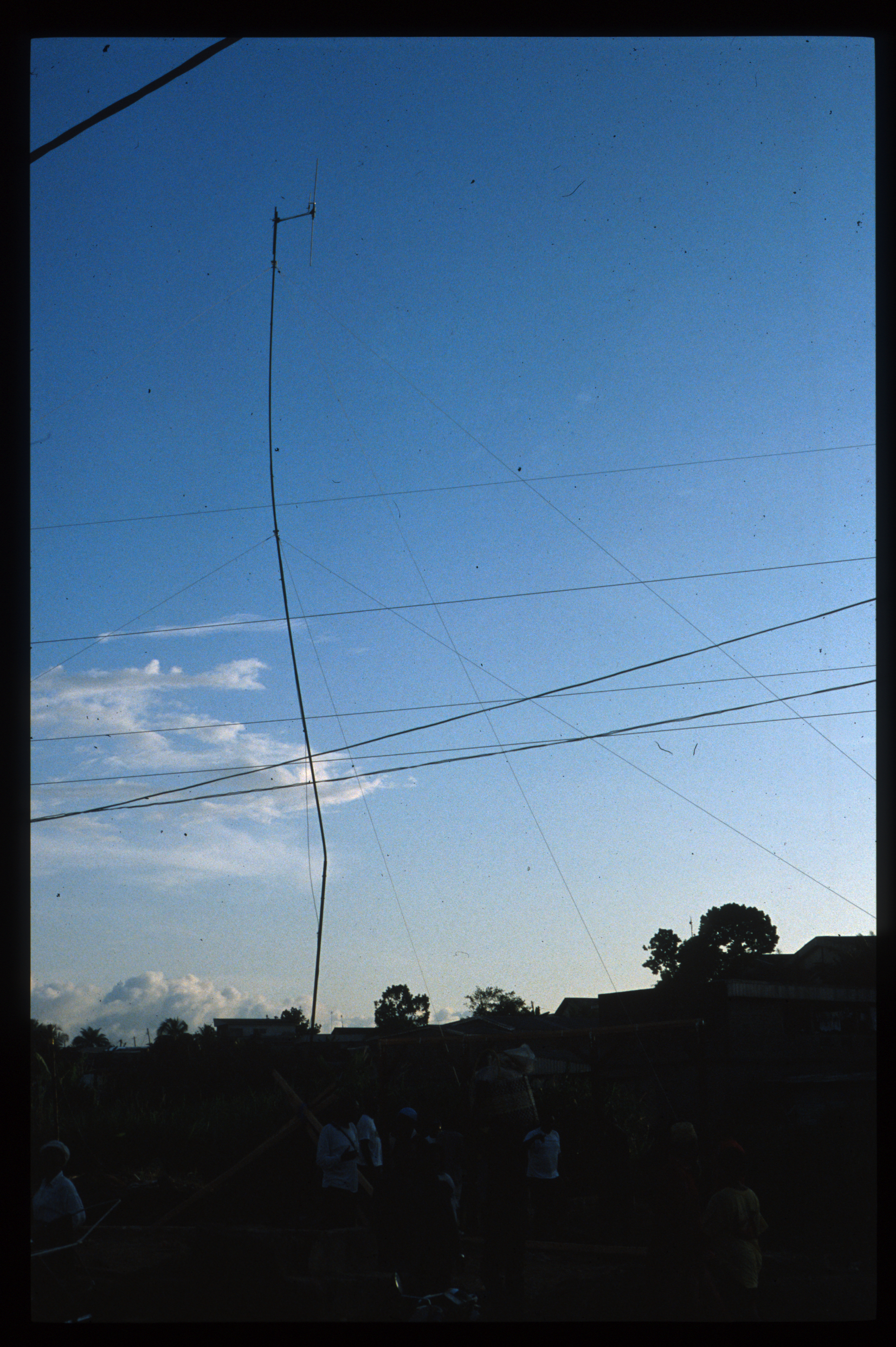

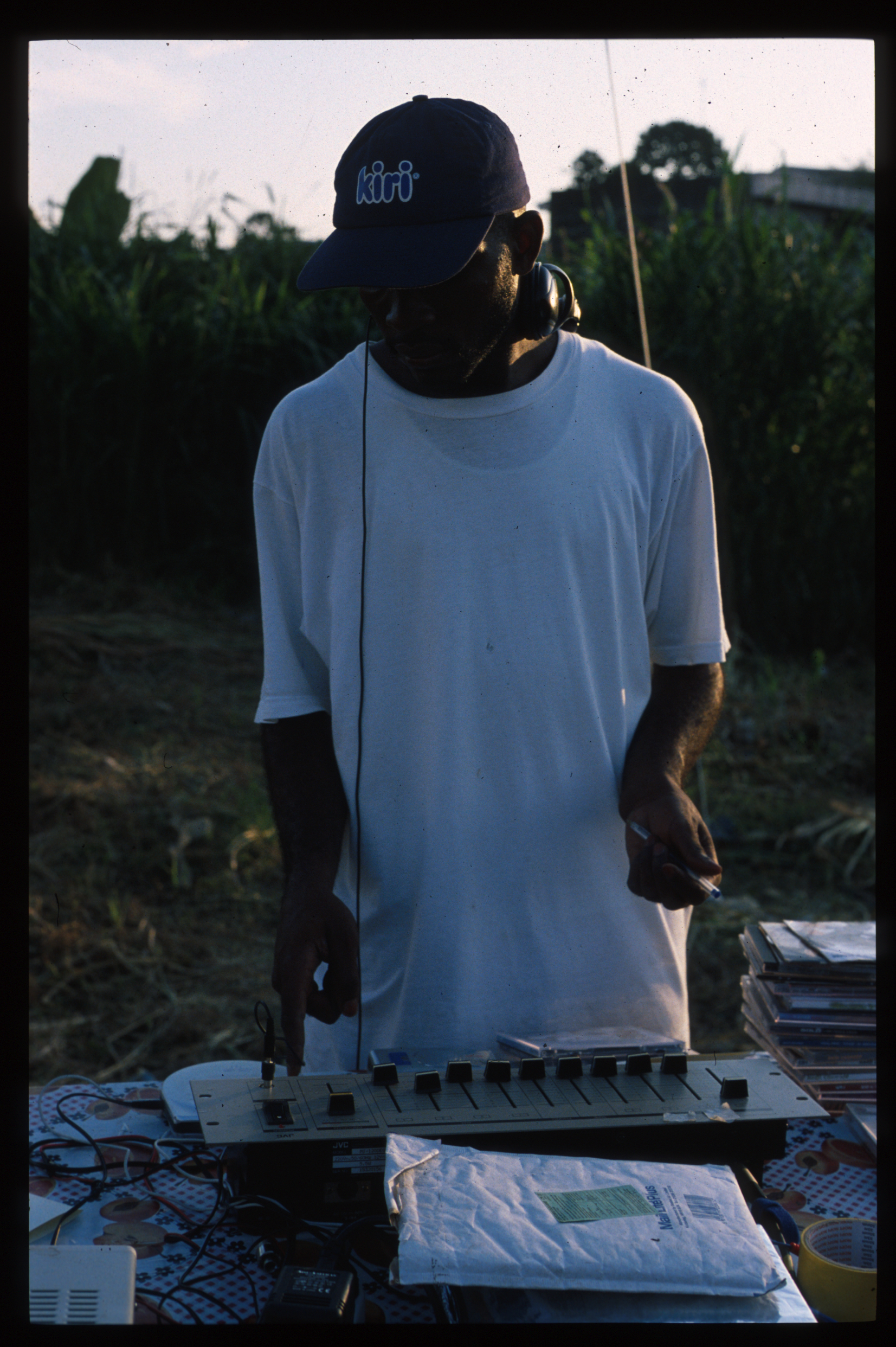

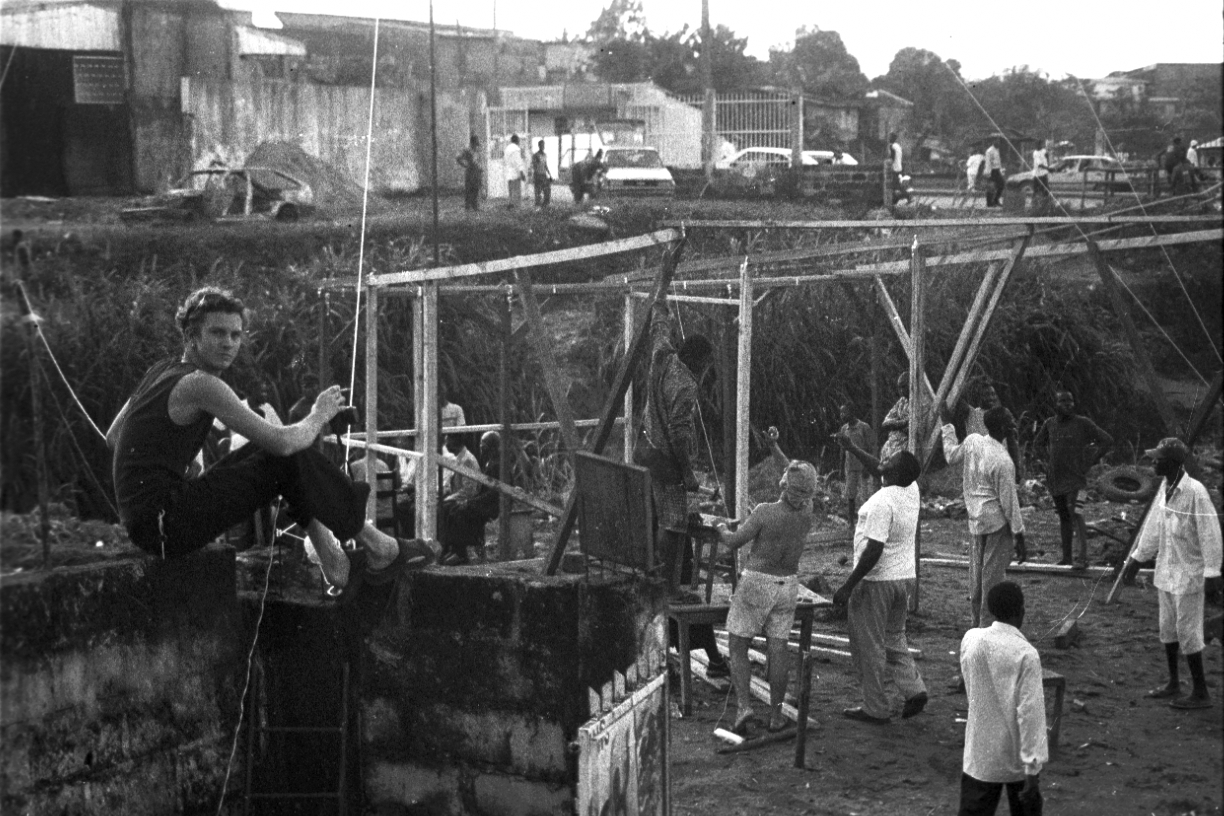

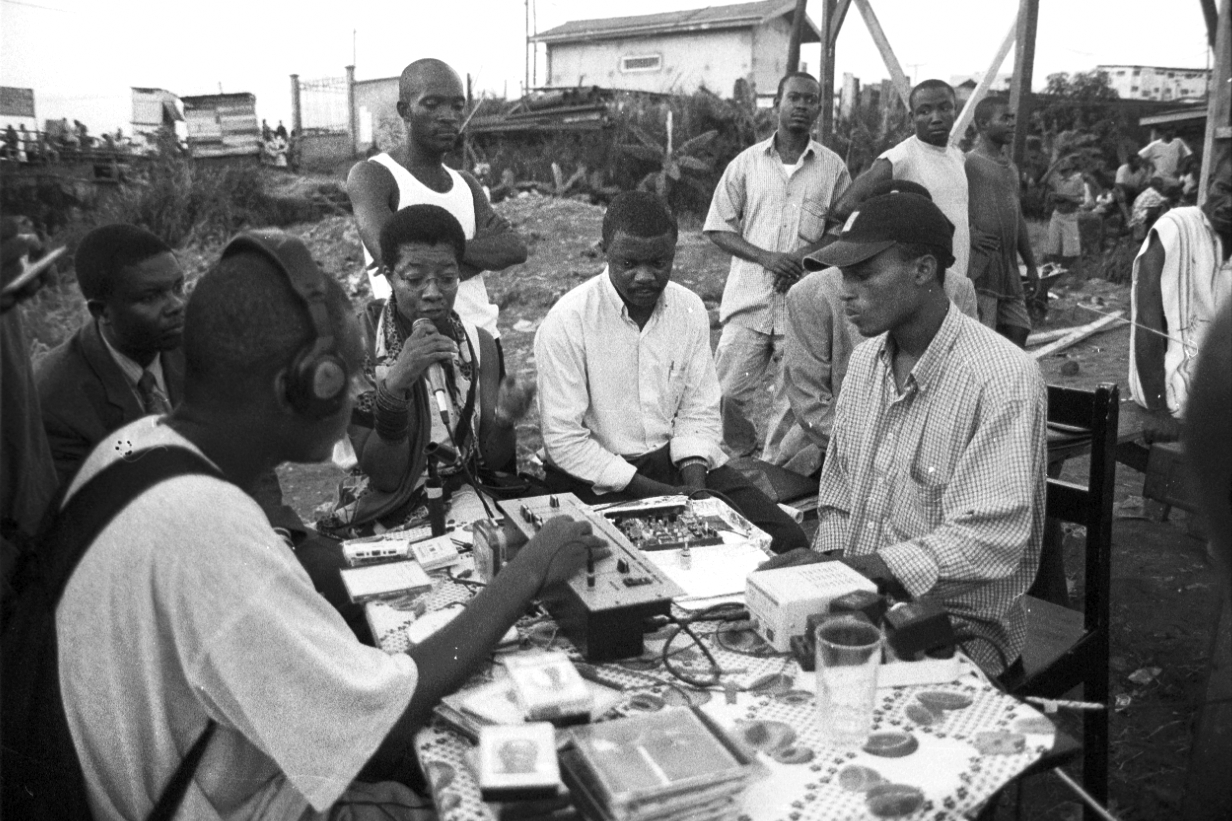

Jesus Palomino creates a shelter using locally available materials.

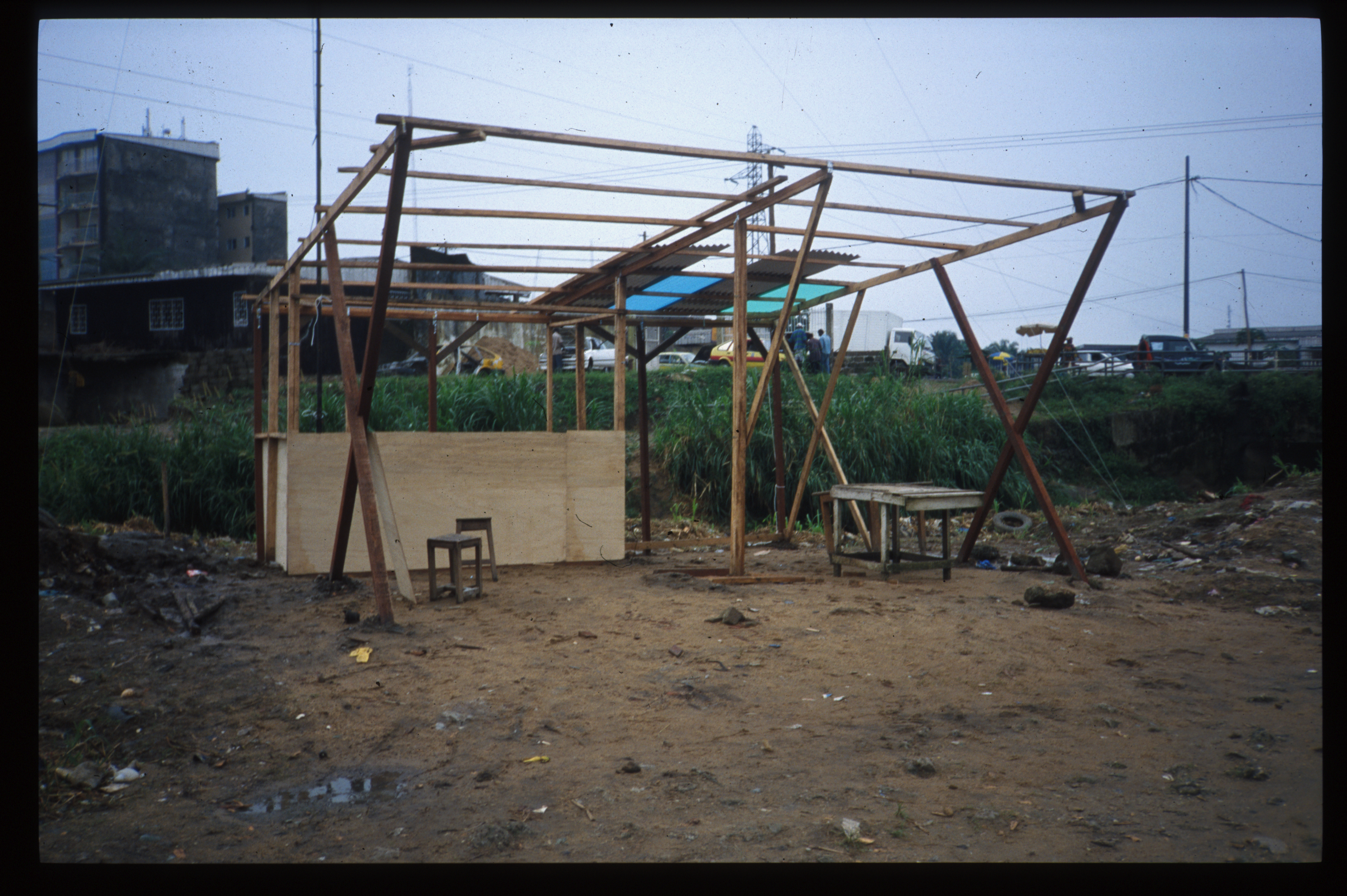

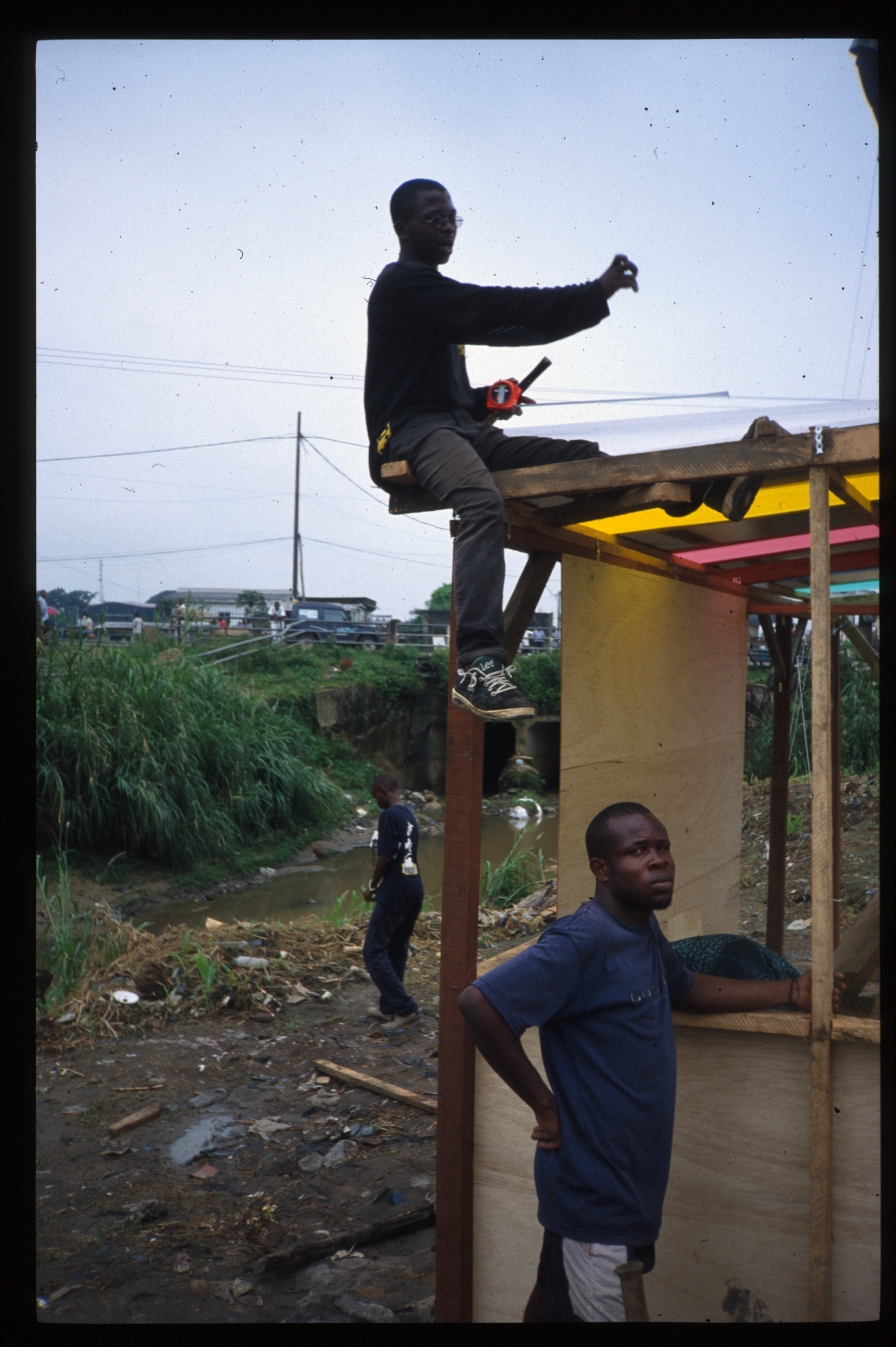

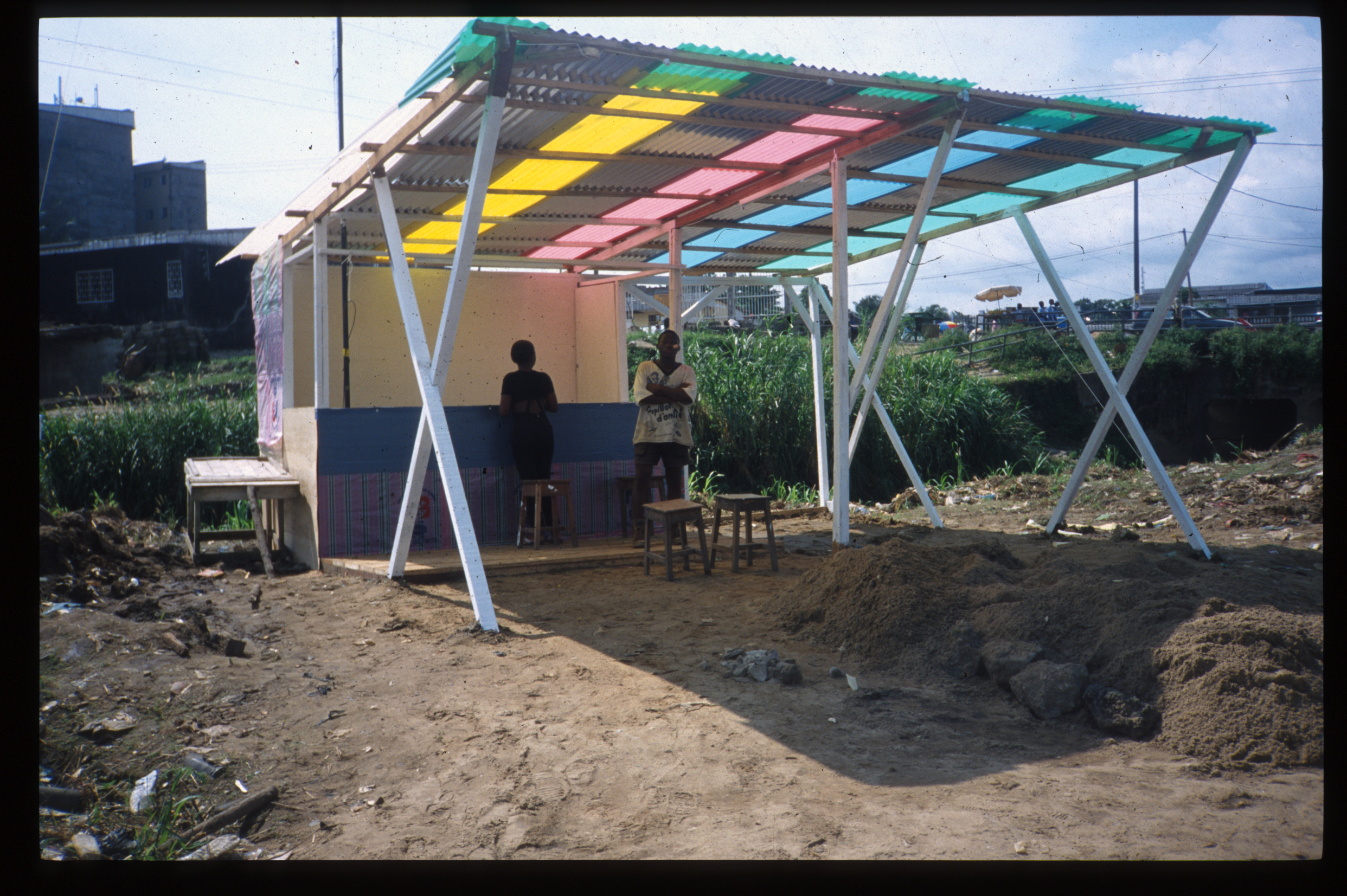

Goddy Leye takes pictures of twenty smiling people from the neighbourhood and makes some digital manipulation. The portraits are printed and arranged in random groups and positioned as posters in the estate. Produced from the same footage, the 6-minute video called Bouquet de Sourires (Bouquet of Smiles), is shown in the neighbourhood.

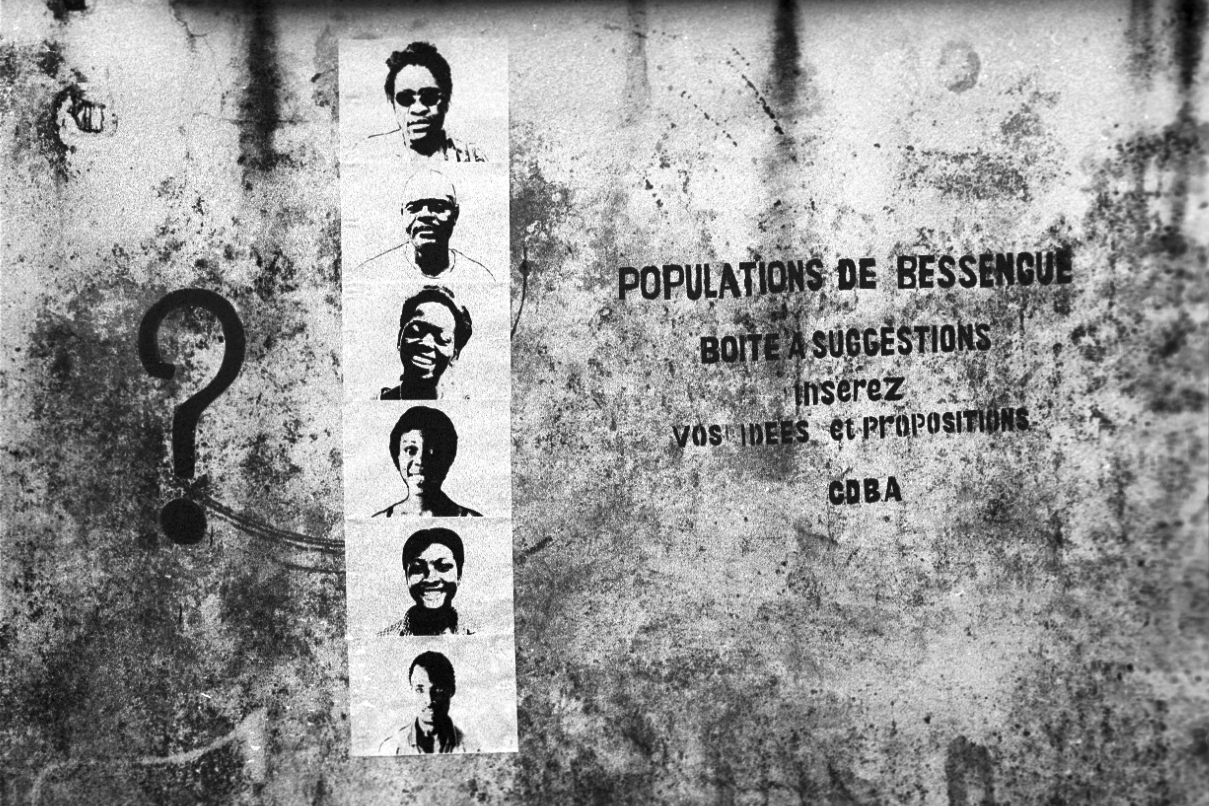

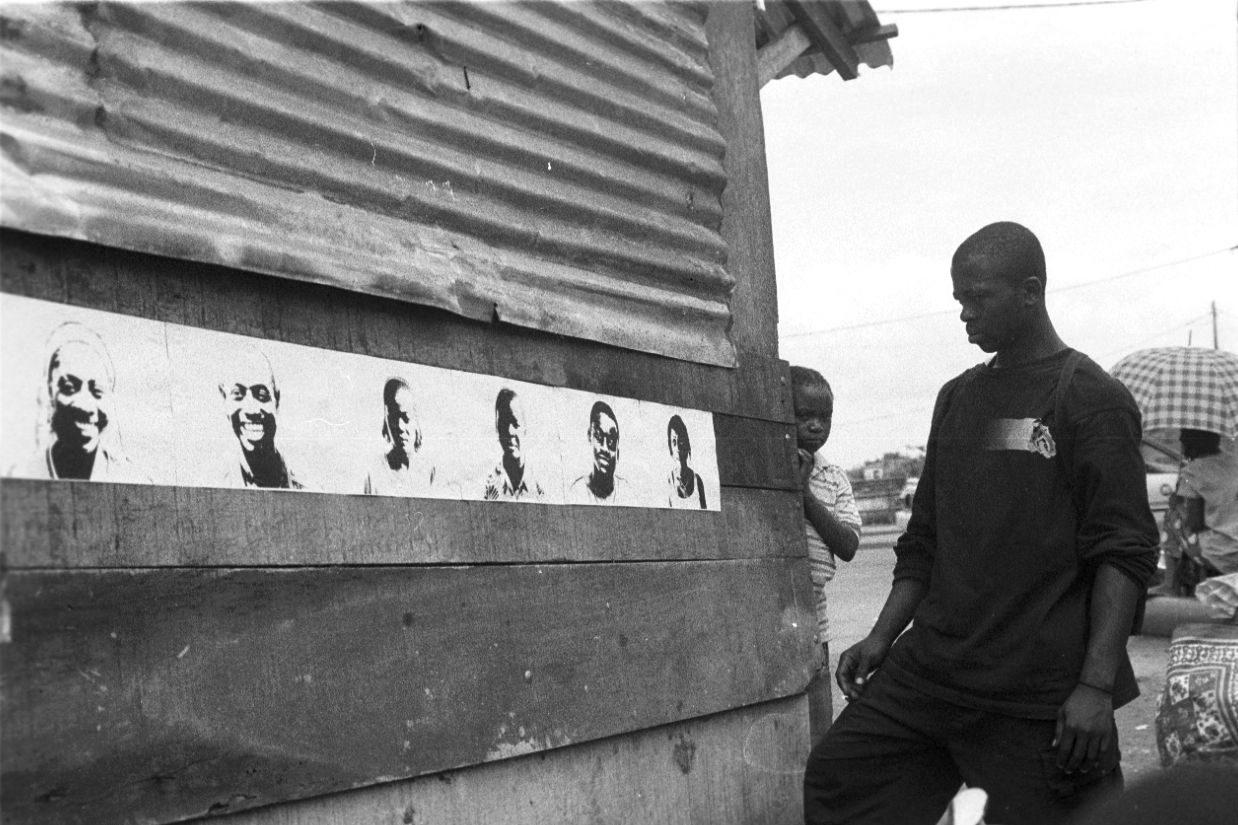

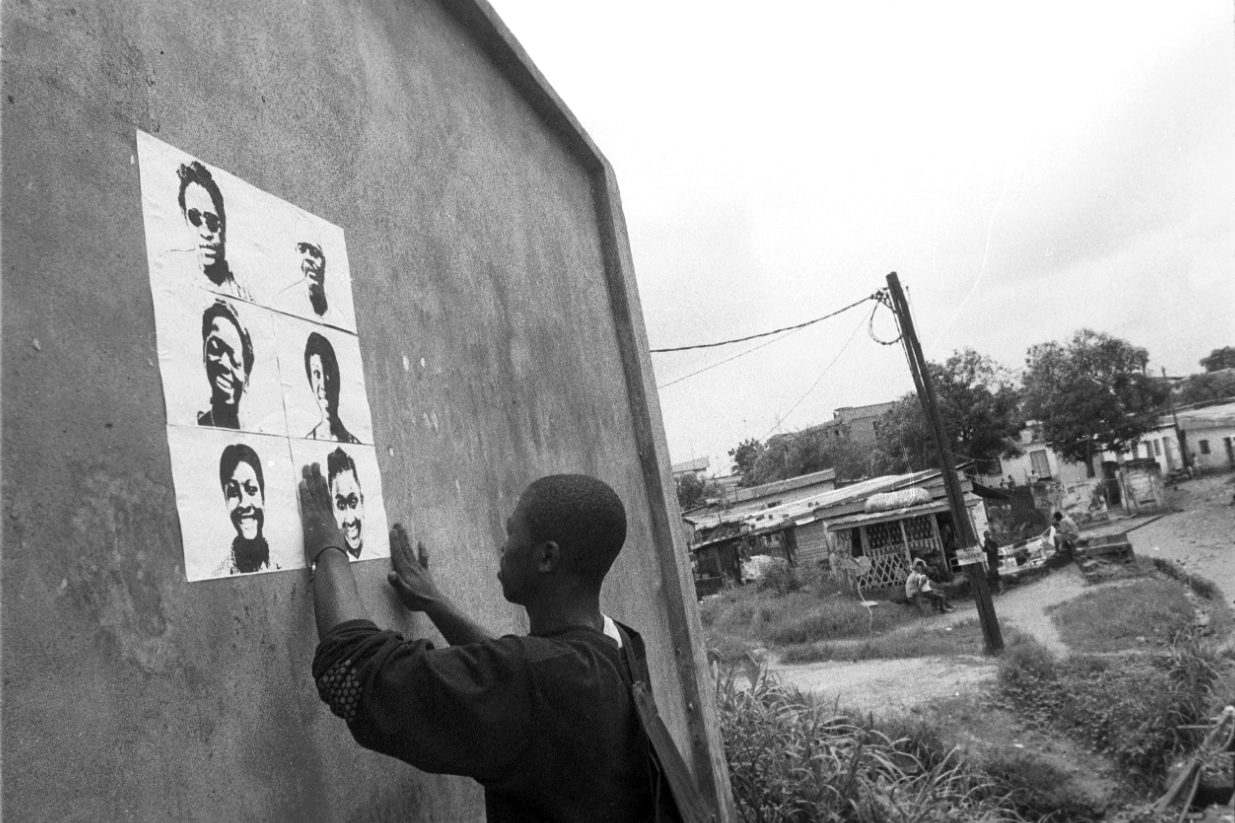

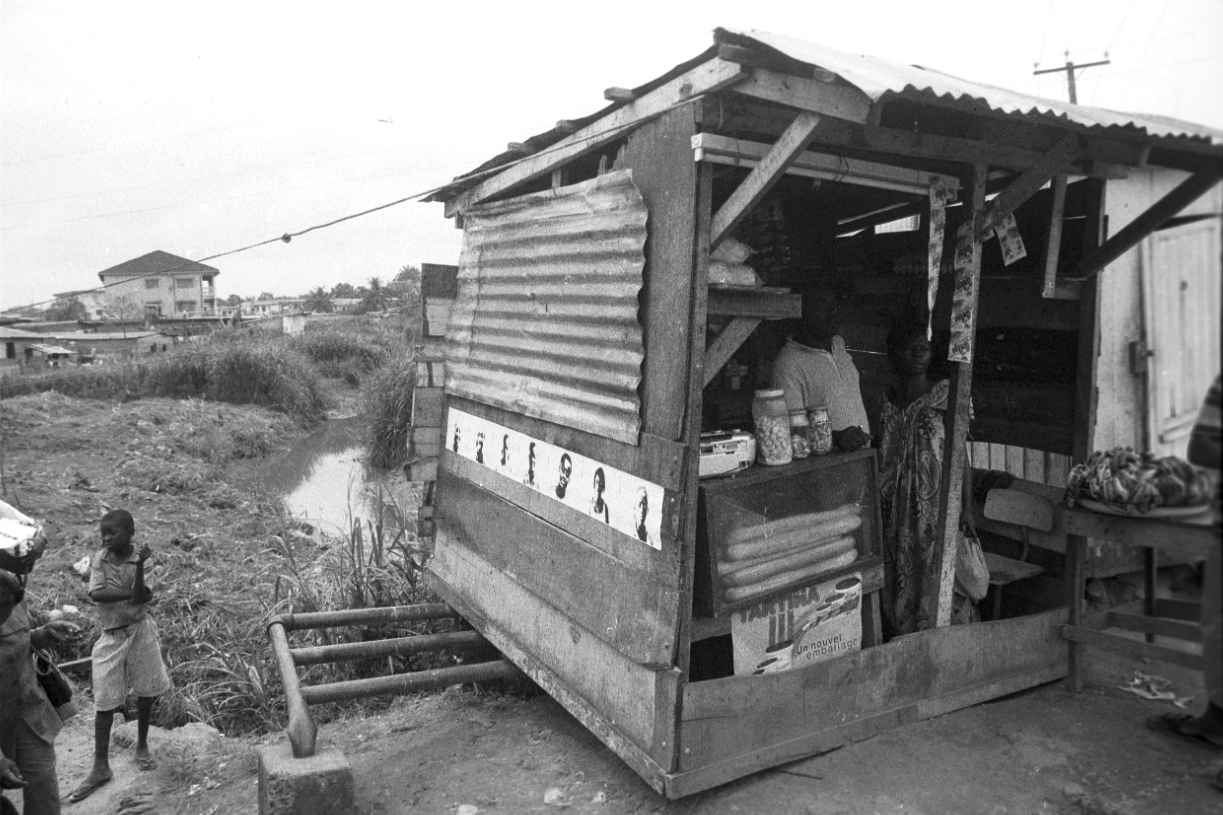

Hartanto builds the website of the project and he connects one person from Bessengue with another from Bandung. The messages, written in French (Bessengue) and Indonesian (Bandung), are scanned and sent with their translation in both directions. News on everyday life and the local environment are exchanged on a daily basis.

=== Exit Tour ===
Exit Tour - Douala, Cotonou, Lomé, Accra, Ouagadougou, Bamako, Dakar is a collaborative artistic project organised in 2006. In occasion of Dak'art 2006, seven artists (Ginette Daleu, Justine Gaga, Dunja Herzog, Lucfosther Diop, Achillekà Komguem, Alioum Moussa and Goddy Leye) departed from Douala and reached Dakar using only public transportation. During the three-months journey, the artists visited galleries, artists and participated to workshops in Cotonou, Lomé, Accra, Ouagadougou, Bamako, Dakar.

=== Other activities ===
- Poetry Festival 3v, 2009.

== See also ==
- List of public art in Douala
- Borne Fontaine
