= Goddy Leye =

Cameroonian artist and intellectual

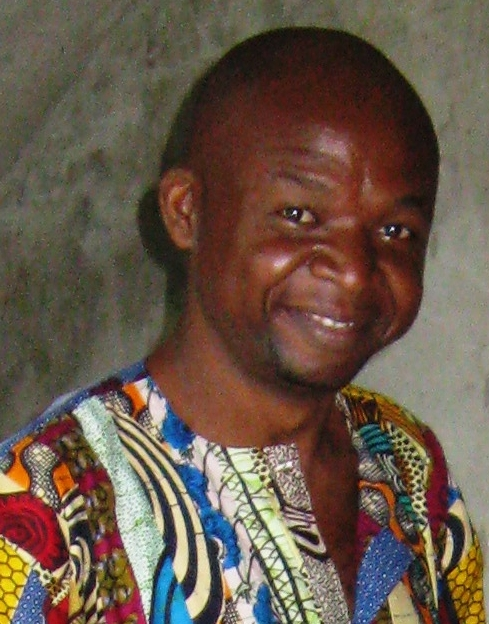
- Born: Godfried Kadjo; 24 November 1965; Mbouda, Cameroon
- Died: 2011 (aged 45); Bonendale, Cameroon
- Education: University of Yaoundé, Rijksakademie van Beeldende Kunsten
- Known for: Video art, installation art, Conceptual art, Art criticism

Goddy Leye (24 November 1965 in Mbouda, Cameroon – 19 February 2011 in Bonendale, Cameroon) was a Cameroonian artist and intellectual.

His work is focused on videos, installations, conceptual art and theoretical contributions. He is the founder of the art centre ArtBakery in Bonendale, Cameroon and he was the curator and promoter of site-specific art and international projects. His role was central in the cultural and art scene in Cameroon and at the international level.

== Life and career ==
Goddy Leye (real name Godfried Kadjo) was born 24 November 1965 in Mbouda, Cameroon. He obtained his diploma at a bilingual high school in 1989 and studied African literature and philology at the University of Yaoundé between 1986 and 1991. In 1990 he obtain his master's in African literature. His artistic training started in 1987 with the artist and art historian Pascal Kenfack in Yaoundé until 1992. He continued his training in 1994 at the National Art Institute in Bamako, in 1997 at the ZKM Karlsruhe Centre for Art and Media in Germany, in 1999 at 18th Street Arts Complex in Santa Monica, California and between 2002 and 2002 at the Rijksakademie van Beeldende Kunsten in Amsterdam. In the Netherlands he co-funds and he becomes member of the Rijksakademie International Network (RAIN), a network of artists who support contemporary cultural practices in their countries of origin. Specifically for his interest in supporting art practices, Leye moved back to Douala in 2002 to create the art centre ArtBakery in Bonendale, devoted specifically to facilitating artistic training and exchanges among artists and to support multimedia, installations, video and digital art.

In 2002 he was the curator of the project Bessengue City, a workshop and a series of site-specific art projects in the neighbourhood of Bessengue in Douala; the project involved Goddy Leye, James Beckett, Hartanto, Jesus Palomino and the local community. In 2006 he promoted and participated in Exit Tour. In 2007 contributed to the Ars&Urbis Workshop organised in Douala by doual'art for the preparation of the SUD Salon Urbain de Douala and he was in residency at the Blachère Foundation in Apt, France. In 2008 he was in residency at the Gasworks cultural space in London; in 2009 he participated at the project Image Art After in dialogue with Florence Ayisi and he contributed at the Cairo Residency Symposium.

Leye's work received prizes from UNESCO, the Rockefeller Foundation and the Dutch Ministry of Foreign Affairs. As an artist and intellectual, he was involved in numerous expert committees; he was a member of the think tank of the Africa Centre in Cape Town and was an ambassador of CAN (Creative Africa Network).

== Work ==
Leye started working as an artist in 1992. His work was focussed on memory, African postcolonialism and on the construction of history. More specifically he expressed himself with multimedia works, videos and video installations. Through time, he started to be involved more and more in the production of projects both in Cameroon and at an international level. He contributed to publications, produced and curated site-specific artworks and founded the centre ArtBakery. The centre offers tools and an infrastructure to artists interested in multimedia productions and it is characterised by an active role in training. Leye was considered a key artist and intellectual by Cameroonian artists of his generation and younger.

Leye expressed his attention to the ways history is told and knowledge is transmitted and forgotten through his art works, writings and his active involvement in conferences and think tanks. His theoretical contributions focused on the structure of cultural institutions, on network systems, on artistic and cultural practices and on urban transformations.

=== Videos and installations ===
- Na Lingi Yo, 2007
- Sankofa River, 1997
- We Are the World, video, 2006
- Elections, UCA project, 2007
- Honey Moon
- Avis sur Visage, video installation, 2007
- The Beautiful Beast, video installation
- Stickers and Wall, Alexandria, Egypt, 2004
- Dancing With the Moon, video installation, 2003
- Reel Location, video, 2002
- The Walking Mirror, video, 2001
- Visa-je, video installation, 2000
- The Voice of the Moon, video installation
- Collaboration with Collectif Auto Da Fe, No Art on Two Dollars A Day, video. Video made from the performance made during SUD Salon Urbain de Douala 2007.

=== Solo exhibitions ===
- Fiction ou realite?, Fri'Art, Fribourg, 2003
- Dancing with the Moon, doual'art, Douala, 2003
- Goddy Leye, Icba Gallery, Salvador de Bahia, 2001
- Sankofa Blues, doual'art, Douala, 2000
- Sankofa Blues, Goethe institute, Yaoundé, 1999
- Behind the Scenes, Electronic Cafe International, Santa Monica, US/on Internet, 1999
- Sankofa River, doual'art, Douala, 1999
- Sankofa, French Cultural Centre, Douala, Douala, 1999
- Sankofa Video, Goethe institute, Yaoundé, 1999
- Fouilles Sauvages, doual'art, Douala, 1996
- Bois Sacré, Goethe institute, Yaoundé, 1995
- Bois Sacré, Ifa, 1995

=== Group exhibitions ===
Goddy Leye's work is exhibited in numerous festivals and international exhibitions.

- Breaking News. Contemporary Photography from the Middle East and Africa, Ex Ospedale Sant'Agostino, Modena, 2010
- SUD PARIS, Maison Revue Noire, Paris, 2010
- Cameroonian Touch.2 – doual'art, Douala, 2010
- This is now 1 & 2 – L'appartement 22, 1st Johannesburg Art Fair, 2088 and Rabat, 2009
- Prêt-à-pARTager, Mode-Fotografie-Workshop, curated by IFA Institut für Auslandsbeziehungen, Dakar, 2008 (touring exhibition)
- Africa Remix, Johannesburg Art Gallery, Johannesburg, 2007
- Ba Mama, Galerie Mam, Douala, 2007
- Contemporary Vision, The World Bank, Yaoundé, 2007
- Africa Remix, Centre Pompidou, Paris, 2006
- Exit Tour, Douala, Cotonou, Lomé, Accra, Ouagadougou, Bamako, Dakar, 2006, promoted by ArtBakery.
- Africa Remix, Museum Kunstpalast, Düsseldorf, Germany, 2004
- New, Netwerk galerij, Aalst, 2003
- Unesco laureates, 18th street arts complex, Santa Monica, USA, 2003
- Post-border land, SBK, Amsterdam, 2003
- Nuits métis, la Ciota, 2003
- Electromediascope, The Nelson Atkins Museum of Art, Kansas City, 2002
- Slow, Shedhalle, Zurich, Switzerland, 2002
- Rendez-vous at Xiamen, Chinese European Art centre, Xiamen, 2002
- Nuits métis, la Ciota, 2002
- Videoformes 2002, Clermont-Ferrand, 2002. Presentation of the video The Walking Mirror.
- Right 2 fight, Sarah Lawrence College, New York, 2002
- Sao Paulo Biennial, Blick Wechsel, São Paulo, Brazil, 2002
- Playtime, Johannesburg, 2002
- Bili Bidjocka / Goddy Leye, Espace Doual'Art, Douala, Cameroon, 2001
- BlickWechsel, IFA-Galerie, Berlin, 2001
- Lucarne, Goethe-Institut, Yaounde, Cameroon, 2001
- BlickWechsel, Bonn and IFA-Galerie Stuttgart, 2000
- Total Global, Museum fur Gegenwartskunst, Bale, 2000
- Havana Biennial, Havana, 2000
- Dak'Art 2000, Biennale de l'Art contemporain africain, Dakar Biennale, Dakar, 2000
- South Meets West, Berne, 2000
- Boulev'Art, Cotonou, 2000
- Sept des cents derniers jours, Espace Doual'art, Douala, 2000
- Lille 2000, Lille, 2000
- South Meets West, Accra, 1999
- Dream, Espace Doual'art, Douala, 1999
- Triennale der Kleinplastik, Stuttgart, 1998
- Dak'art 98, Dakar Biennale, Dakar, 1998
- Fenac 98 Festival national de l'Art et de la Culture, Ebolowa, 1998
- L'Art entre Tradition et Globalisation, Goethe-Institut, Yaoundé, 1997
- Le Kwatt, Espace Doual'art, Douala, 1997
- Babil 2, Espace Doual'art, Douala, 1997
- Resource Art Cameroon, Goethe-Institute, Yaoundé, 1996
- Cameroon Art, Galeria Arte Mondo, Sarrano, 1996
- Africa Unite, Galerie Africréa, Yaoundé, 1996
- Nouvelles Tendances de la Peinture camerounaise, Galerie Africréa, Yaoundé, 1996
- Babil, Goethe-Institute, Yaoundé, 1995
- Taxi-couleurs, ERBA Ecole régionale des Beaux-Arts, Angers, 1995
- Fenac 94, Douala, 1994
- Taxi-Couleurs, CCF-INA, Bamako, 1994
- Festac 88 National Festival of Arts and Culture, Douala, 1988

=== Theoretic contributions and curatorial work ===
Goddy Leye contributed to publications and magazines such as Chimurenga magazine. He actively supported the creation of the magazine DiARTgonale founded by the artist Achilleka. He was the founder and director of the centre ArtBakery, started in 2002. He was the curator of the project Bessengue City organised in the neighbourhood of Bessengue in Douala in 2002 and he was the promoter in 2006 of Exit Tour.
