= List of Zimbabwean artists =

The following list of Zimbabwean artists (in alphabetical order by last name) includes artists of various genres, who are notable and are either born in Zimbabwe, of Zimbabwean descent or who produce works that are primarily about Zimbabwe.

== A ==
- Fanizani Akuda (1932–2011), sculptor
- Amanda Shingirai Mushate (born 1995) abstract painter and sculptor.

== B ==
- Coster Balakasi (born 1972), sculptor
- Dominic Benhura (born 1968), sculptor
- Berry Bickle (born 1959), sculptor, installation artist, and conceptual artist
- Lameck Bonjisi (1973–2004), sculptor
- Tafunga Bonjisi (born 1982), stone sculptor
- Witness Bonjisi (born 1975), sculptor

== C ==
- Crispen Chakanyuka (1943–2002), sculptor
- Chikonzero Chazunguza (born 1967), painter, printmaker, educator, activist
- Square Chikwanda (born 1972), sculptor
- Sanwell Chirume (born 1941), sculptor
- Kudzanai Chiurai (born 1981), mixed media artist, activist
- Richard Chiwasa (born 1947), sculptor
- Edward Chiwawa (born 1935), sculptor
- Bevil Conway (born 1974), neuroscientist, painter, printmaker, and visual perception and color researcher

== D ==
- Stanford Derere, sculptor
- Kim Donaldson (born 1952), painter of African portraits and wildlife
- Pfungwa Dziike (born 1972), sculptor

== F ==
- Arthur Fata (born 1963), sculptor
- Charles Fernando (1941–1995), painter and jazz musician

== G ==
- Bronson Gengezha (born 1981), sculptor
- Barankinya Gosta (1935–1998), Zimbabwean-Chewa sculptor
- Tapfuma Gutsa (born 1956), sculptor

== H ==
- Barry Hilton (born 1956), South African comedian and actor who was born in Harare
- Kudzanai-Violet Hwami (born 1993), Zimbabwean painter who lives in London, England
- Masimba Hwati, sculptor, performance artist, sound artist, and three-dimensional mixed media sculptor

== K ==
- Makina Kameya (1920–1988), Angolan-born Zimbabwean sculptor
- Biggie Kapeta (1956–1999), sculptor
- Godfrey Kennedy (born 1974), sculptor

== L ==
- Laiwan (born 1961), multidisciplinary artist, gallerist, curator, writer, and educator; lives in Vancouver, British Columbia
- Helen Lieros (1940–2021), Zimbabwean painter of Greek heritage

== M ==
- Garrison Machinjili (born 1963), sculptor
- Gerald Machona (born 1986), sculptor, performance artist, new media artist, photographer and filmmaker
- Colleen Madamombe (1964–2009), sculptor, primarily working in stone
- Adam Madebe (born 1954), metal sculptor
- Bulelwa Madekurozwa (born 1972), Zambian-born Zimbabwean painter and printmaker
- Bernard Manyandure (1929–1999), sculptor
- Wallen Mapondera (born 1985), illustrator, mixed media artist
- Daniel Mariga (c. 1976–2006), sculptor
- Joram Mariga (1927–2000), stone sculptor; the "father of Zimbabwean sculpture"
- Eddie Masaya (born 1960), sculptor
- Moses Masaya (1947–1995), sculptor, working primarily in stone
- Owen Maseko (born 1975), painter, installation artist
- Bernard Matemera (1946–2002), stone sculptor
- Jonathan Mhondorohuma (born 1974), sculptor
- Boira Mteki (1946–1991), sculptor and educator; worked as a gallery attendant for much of his career
- Godfrey Mtenga (born c. 1965), sculptor
- Sylvester Mubayi (1942–2022), stone sculptor
- Thomas Mukarobgwa (1924–1999), painter and sculptor
- Celestino Mukavhi (born 1972), sculptor
- Mukomberanwa family
  - Anderson Mukomberanwa (1968–2003), stone sculptor
  - Ennica Mukomberanwa (born 1978), sculptor
  - Grace Mukomberanwa (born 1944), soapstone sculptor, within Shona art
  - Lawrence Mukomberanwa (born 1976), sculptor
  - Nesbert Mukomberanwa (born 1969), sculptor
  - Netsai Mukomberanwa, sculptor
  - Nicholas Mukomberanwa (1940–2002), sculptor and art teacher
  - Taguma Mukomberanwa (born 1978), sculptor
  - Tendai Mukomberanwa (born 1974), sculptor
- Henry Munyaradzi (1931–1998), stone sculptor, within Shona art
- Onias Mupumha (born 1978), sculptor
- Dudzai Mushawepwere (born 1974), sculptor
- Darius Mutamba (born 1991), conceptual visual artist, curator, journalist, and photojournalist
- Maxwell Mutanda (born 1983), artist, designer, design researcher, and businessperson
- Lincon Muteta (born 1975), sculptor
- Nontsikelelo Mutiti (born 1982), multimedia artist
- Joseph Muzondo (born 1953), painter and sculptor

== N ==
- Joseph Ndandarika (1940–1991), figurative sculptor
- Locardia Ndandarika (1945–2023), sculptor
- George Nene (1959–2005), painter
- Benard Nkanjo (born 1970), sculptor, primarily working in stone
- Agnes Nyanhongo (born 1960), soapstone sculptor
- Gedion Nyanhongo (born 1967), stone sculptor

== O ==
- Lucky Office (born 1976), sculptor

== P ==
- Thakor Patel (born 1932), Indian contemporary painter and printmaker; lives in Zimbabwe
- Korky Paul, Zimbabwean-born British illustrator of children's books

== S ==
- Anthony Sabuneti (born 1974), sculptor
- Norbert Shamuyarira (born 1962), sculptor
- Doreen Sibanda (born 1954), UK-born Zimbabwean painter of Jamaican heritage; also a curator, arts administrator
- Collin Sixpence (born 1974), sculptor
- Sam Songo (1929–c. 1977), Rhodesian sculptor
- Amos Supuni (1970–2008), Malawi-born Zimbabwean sculptor

== T ==
- Moffat Takadiwa (born 1983), sculptor
- Bernard Takawira (1948–1997), sculptor
- Gerald Takawira (1964–2004), sculptor
- John Takawira (1938–1989), sculptor
- Ronika Tandi (born 1975), soapstone sculptor

== W ==
- Brian Watyoka (born 1973), sculptor of wood and stone

== Z ==
- Ignatius Zhuwakiyi (born 1969), sculptor
- Portia Zvavahera (born 1985), painter

== See also ==
- Chapungu Sculpture Park
- Zimbabwean art
- List of Zimbabwean Americans
- List of Zimbabwean women artists
