= List of Zimbabwean women artists =

This is a list of women artists who were born in Zimbabwean, of Zimbabwean descent, or whose artworks are closely associated with that country.

== A ==
- Amanda Shingirai Mushate (born 1995) Zimbabwean contemporary visual artist known for abstract paintings and sculptural work.

== B ==
- Berry Bickle (born 1959), sculptor, installation artist, and conceptual artist

== H ==
- Kudzanai-Violet Hwami (born 1993), Zimbabwean painter who lives in London, England

== L ==
- Laiwan (born 1961), multidisciplinary artist, gallerist, curator, writer, and educator; lives in Vancouver, British Columbia
- Helen Lieros (1940–2021), Zimbabwean painter of Greek heritage

== M ==
- Colleen Madamombe (1964–2009), sculptor, primarily working in stone
- Bulelwa Madekurozwa (born 1972), Zambian-born Zimbabwean painter and printmaker
- Ennica Mukomberanwa (born 1978), sculptor
- Grace Mukomberanwa (born 1944), soapstone sculptor, within Shona art
- Netsai Mukomberanwa, sculptor

== N ==
- Locardia Ndandarika (1945–2023), sculptor
- Agnes Nyanhongo (born 1960), soapstone sculptor

== S ==
- Doreen Sibanda (born 1954), UK-born Zimbabwean painter of Jamaican heritage; also a curator, arts administrator

== T ==
- Ronika Tandi (born 1975), soapstone sculptor

== Z ==
- Portia Zvavahera (born 1985), painter

== See also ==
- Zimbabwean art
- List of Zimbabwean artists
- List of Zimbabwean painters
