= Edward Paterson =

Zimbabwean educator (1895–1974)

Edward "Ned" Paterson (1895–1974) was a pioneering art teacher in Rhodesia (now Zimbabwe). He is known for founding Cyrene School near Bulawayo, and for introducing the Arts and Crafts style to Africans in both South Africa and Rhodesia. Some of his students were among the first professional African artists in Rhodesia.

== Early life and education ==
Paterson was born in Aberdeen, Scotland, and emigrated to the South African Republic with his family in 1901. He left school young and went to work at fourteen, serving part-time in the Transvaal Scottish Regiment. During World War I his regiment was called up, and Paterson served in the Namibian and East African campaigns before being demobilized in 1918. After the war he was awarded a veteran's scholarship, and went to study at the Central School of Arts and Crafts in London. Although he possessed a tremendous love of art, Paterson was not sufficiently talented to pursue an art career on his own. He returned to South Africa, joined the Transvaal diocese of the Anglican church in 1924, and completed his religious training in 1928 when he was ordained as a deacon.

== Year at Grace Dieu 1925 ==
Paterson's artistic influence first made itself felt at Grace Dieu, an Anglican high school for Africans near Pietersburg, where he was posted for the 1925 school year. The school had an unusual syllabus that included carpentry and drawing. Paterson introduced the school's workshop students to bas relief carving, which he had learned in art school. This form of carving soon became the school's trademark style, and was continued by a nun called Sister Pauline after Paterson's departure. Before long, the school developed what would become Africa's first art workshop, with students and attached professional carvers producing religious carvings on commission for churches needing furniture and ecclesiastical objects. Ernest Mancoba and Job Kekana, two of South Africa's first professional black artists, emerged from this workshop. The African carvers at the workshop were not given the latitude to create their own designs at the workshop, but were instead given designs and asked to transfer them onto the wood. Paterson supplied many of the designs used at the workshop through the late 1930s as a means of augmenting his small income.

== Work in the Transvaal, 1928-1938 ==
After being ordained, Paterson served a number of African congregations for the Transvaal diocese for a decade in locations such as Sophiatown and Potchefstroom. During this time he helped decorate a number of new Anglican churches in his diocese, including many murals and carvings. All this work was erased in the 1950s when the Nationalist government relocated urban Africans to townships and destroyed their old neighborhoods. In 1933 Paterson was married to Mary Phillips, with whom he would have four children.

== Cyrene Mission, 1939-53 ==
The centerpiece of Paterson's career were his years in charge of Cyrene School, near Bulawayo in Rhodesia, where he moved to in 1939. This school, which Paterson started from scratch, focused on practical and agricultural education. It was the first African school in Rhodesia to have art classes, which were made mandatory for all students. "Our aim is to turn out the self-contained burger type, able to farm rationally and to care for his cattle, able to build his own home and to make its furniture and even to enrich them by carving and design." All students took painting and drawing classes with Paterson until he left the school in 1953. He also established an arts workshop that met in the afternoons, which typically included disabled students unable to take part in sports or construction. These students also learned to carve, sculpt and produce linocut prints.

Cyrene became well known as Paterson sought to exhibit his artists and sell their work in order to recoup the heavy costs of providing art education. By 1944 his artists were selling strongly among White Rhodesians. In 1947 the repute of Cyrene was sufficient to attract a visit from the King George VI's 1947 tour of southern Africa. In the wake of the ensuing publicity from the royal visit, traveling exhibitions of Cyrene student art toured South Africa, England, and the United States regularly from 1949-1953, raising enough money for Paterson to cover his annual budget deficits. These exhibitions made Paterson the best-known art educator in Africa of his era. Eventually a number of Rhodesia's first professional African artists emerged from Cyrene. These included Sam Songo, Lazarus Khumalo, and Kingsley Sambo.

== Salisbury art training, 1954-74 ==
Seeking new horizons, Paterson shifted to the growing urban capital of Salisbury. He continued to teach art to African children, first at Chirodzo (1954–61), Nyarutsetso (1961-68), and later at Farayi Art Center (1968–74). After moving to Salisbury, Paterson expected to have an important role at the new National Gallery, which was chartered in 1954 and established in 1957. Many of Paterson' students exhibited at the initial exhibitions, but soon Paterson and most of his students were marginalized by the National Gallery director, Frank McEwen. Several of Paterson's former pupils, Kingsley Sambo, Boira Mteki, and Thomas Mukarobgwa, ended up in McEwen's "Workshop School". He and McEwen had a number of public spats, and Paterson was effectively shut out of all major National Gallery business thereafter.

== Artistic legacy ==
Paterson's legacy has had a mixed reception from scholars. Beyond any doubt, McEwen, whose writings and exhibitions set the tone for the burgeoning international reception of Zimbabwean art, silenced any discussion of Paterson's influence. Jonathan Zilberg has sought to revive Paterson's reputation, maintaining that the history of Shona sculpture needs to be "liberated" by focusing on its origins with Paterson. Other recent scholarship has taken a far more negative view. Randles, for instance, has maintained that mission stations such as Cyrene generally stunted the development of their artists. Morton, meanwhile, has maintained that Paterson's students typically copied his own limited style, and were never able to get the training they needed to progress technically. Only artists such as Sambo, who broke away from Paterson, or Mancoba, who insisted in designing his own works, were able to bypass the limited training they received from him. The rest of Paterson's students, according to Morton, produced for the tourist trade: "Paterson's chief legacy is in tourist art".
