= Pfungwa Dziike =

Zimbabwean sculptor (born 1972)

- Born: Pfungwa; 1972 (age 53–54); Mutare
- Citizenship: Zimbabwe
- Occupation: Sculptor

Pfungwa Dziike (born 1972) is a Zimbabwean sculptor.

== Biography ==
A native of Mutare, Dziike lost his parents while in primary school, and was raised by his Shona grandmother. She made clay pots, which he began to assist with. While they worked, she would tell him shona stories.

His education complete, Dziike moved to Harare to live with an aunt. He was introduced to a group of stone sculptors who invited him to join a cooperative called "Art Peace", based at the city's Silveira House mission. At the same time he spent five years as assistant to Amos Supuni, who taught him much about stonecarving. He later worked with Collin Sixpence and Royal Katiyo at the Chapungu Sculpture Park.

Dziike currently lives and works in Mabvuku.
