= Celestino Mukavhi =

Zimbabwean sculptor (1972–2022)

- Born: September 27, 1972
- Died: June 12, 2022 (aged 49)
- Occupation: Sculptor

Celestino Mukavhi (27 September 1972 – 12 June 2022) was a Zimbabwean sculptor.

== Biography ==
A native of the Bikita area of Masvingo Province, Mukavhi was the last-born in a family of nine. His parents were subsistence farmers with little education. In 1975, his mother was killed in crossfire during the war for liberation. Mukavhi grew up on communal lands, leaving school in 1987 to begin work as a farmer. In 1989, his father was murdered, and he was forced to move to Harare in search of work. Homeless for a time, he was sleeping near the road to Chapungu when he was discovered by Boira Mteki, who invited him to study the art of stonecarving. Mukavhi did, assisting him for six months. He also worked with Agnes Nyanhongo, Arthur Fata, Cosmas Muchenje, and Garrison Machinjili. His work won recognition at the 1992 Zimbabwe Roots exhibition; in 1993, he became an artist in residence at the Chapungu Sculpture Park.

Mukavhi was based in Zimbabwe and continued to sculpt throughout his life. He valued family and was a peace-loving man — themes that were often reflected in his sculpture. He also traveled to Germany from time to time, where there was a market for his work.
