= Richard Chiwasa =

Zimbabwean sculptor

- Born: Richard; June 1947 (age 78); Harare
- Citizenship: Zimbabwe
- Education: primary school
- Occupation: Sculptor

Richard Chiwasa (b. June, 1947) is a Zimbabwean sculptor.

Born in Harare, Chiwasa went to primary school locally until Standard Six. He began sculpting soapstone in 1967, later being taught to work harder materials by Canon Edward George Paterson at Nyarutsetso Art Centre. In 1970 he left the center to work at Victoria Falls, where he worked for ten years at the "Craft Village". Chiwasa currently works in hard stones such as verdite, springstone, and butter jade. He has worked with Sylvester Mubayi, Nicholas Mukomberanwa, and Moses Masaya among other sculptors.
