= Brian Watyoka =

Zimbabwean sculptor

- Born: Brian; 1973 (age 51–52); Harare
- Citizenship: Zimbabwe
- Occupation: Sculptor
- Employer: private collections

Brian Watyoka (born 1973) is a Zimbabwean sculptor.

Born in Harare, Watyoka began by assisting his uncle to sandpaper, polish, and finish his soapstone works; he also aided another uncle in carving wood sculpture. In 1993 he joined a cooperative working as a woodcarver; Boira Mteki would pass through, admiring his work, and one day invited him to become a studio assistant. Watyoka stayed with the older man for two years, working at the Chapungu Sculpture Park. There he learned to carve hard stones, such as serpentinite and dolomite. He spent a further year working with Joseph Muzondo before becoming a sculptor in his own right, and he signed a contract for two years with Chapungu.

Watyoka's work is in private collections worldwide.
