= Sylvester Mubayi =

Zimbabwean sculptor (1942–2022)

Sylvester Mubayi (1942 – 13 December 2022) was a Zimbabwean sculptor.

== Early life and education ==
Sylvester Mubayi was born in 1942 in the Chihota Reserve near Marondera, Zimbabwe, the sixth child in a family of nine. He left school aged sixteen and worked as a tobacco grader. In 1966 he moved to Harare (then Salisbury) and worked at the Chibuku Breweries.

== Later life and exhibitions ==
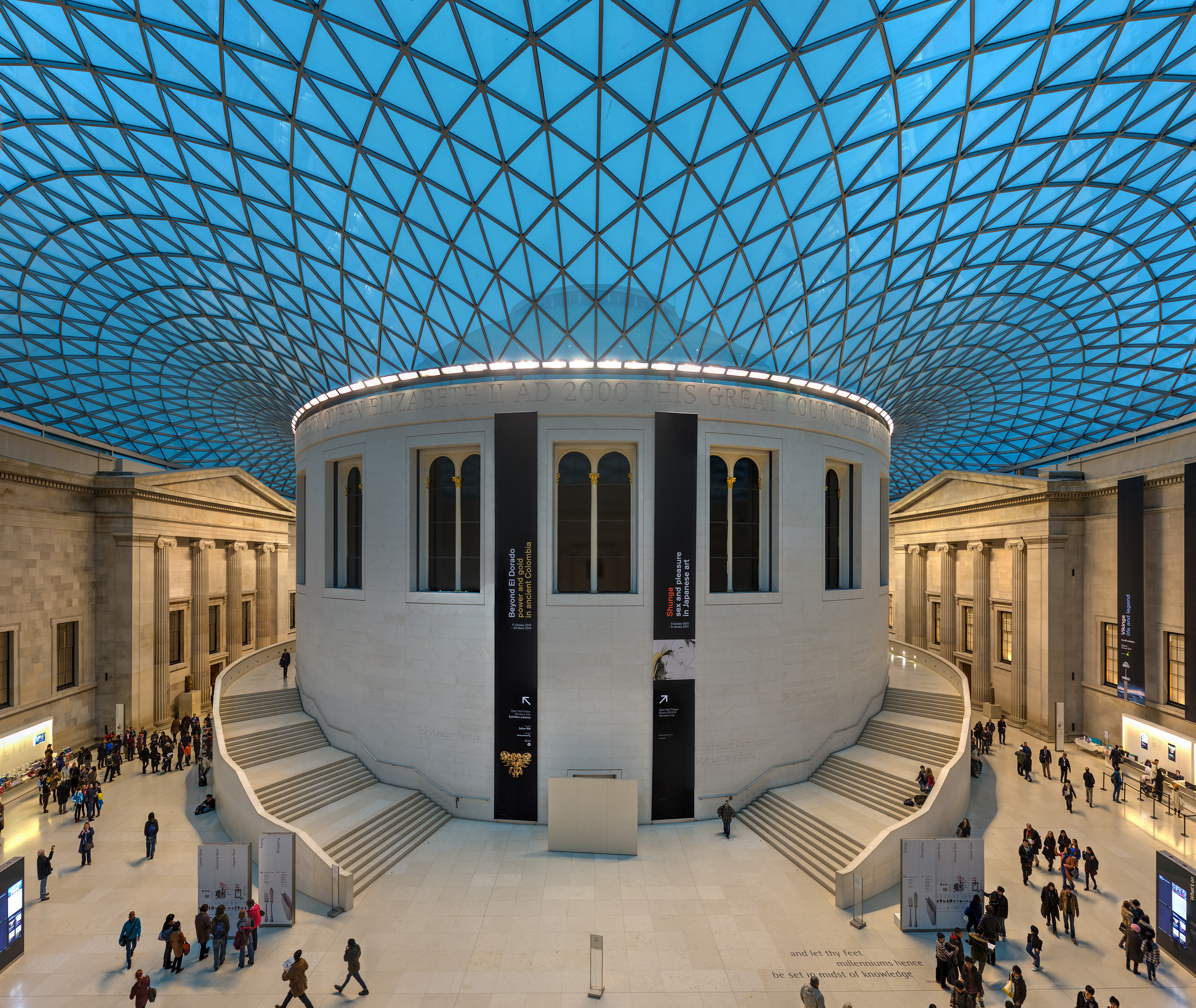
Click to view Skeletal Baboon Spirit in British Museum collection.

Mubayi joined the Tengenenge Sculpture Community in April 1967 as one of its early members. In 1969, Frank McEwen, who was the founding director of the Rhodes National Gallery in Harare, opened a workshop school to encourage the development of local artists and his wife Mary (née McFadden) established Vukutu, a sculptural farm near Nyanga: Mubayi was the first sculptor to work there. McEwen lauded Mubayi as the "greatest sculptor of all time" and after McEwen's death his bequest of sculptures to the British Museum included six pieces by Mubayi. According to Jonathan Zilbert, Mubayi at that time used skeletons as a recurring theme in his work, intending them to illustrate ancestral spirits and blood sacrifice.

An exhibition of sculptures which toured South African cities in 1968–9 included a stone carving Nzuzu (Waterspirit) by Mubayi and it won an Oppenheimer Memorial Trust Award for sculpture.

Mubayi was an artist in residence at the Chapungu Sculpture Park and subsequently lived and worked in Chitungwiza; his sculptures are inspired by stories of spirits and the supernatural, combining human and animal forms. The stones used include springstone and lepidolite. In 1988, Michael Shepherd, a British art critic commented:

“Now that Henry Moore is dead, who is the greatest living stone sculptor? Were I to choose, I would choose from three Zimbabwean sculptors — Sylvester Mubayi, Nicholas Mukomberanwa and Joseph Ndandarika.”

The catalogue Chapungu: Culture and Legend – A Culture in Stone for an exhibition at Kew Gardens in 2000 depicts Mubayi's sculptures Protected by our Spirits (Springstone, 1999) on p. 34-35, Spirit Bird Prays for Rain (Springstone, 1997) on p. 90-91 and Returning to my Sekuru (Elder) (Springstone, 1997) on p. 98-99. An exhibition of the same name toured in the US in 2003, with Mubayi's Traditional Healer presented at the Chicago Botanic Garden and the Garfield Park Conservatory.

The National Gallery of Zimbabwe held a retrospective of his life's work in August 2008 to much acclaim. Their permanent collection includes The Skeleton Man, and Witch and Her Mate.

In 2017, Mubayi represented Zimbabwe at the 57th Venice Biennale. His sculpture exhibited there included Snail Crossing the River, Spirit Buffalo and War Victim.

=== Selected solo or group exhibitions ===
- 1971 Sculpture Contemporaine des Shonas d’Afrique, Musée Rodin, Paris, France
- 1978 MOMA, New York, USA
- 1990 Contemporary Stone Carving from Zimbabwe, Yorkshire Sculpture Park, UK
- 2000 Chapungu: Custom and Legend – A Culture in Stone, Kew Gardens, UK

== Death ==
Mubayi died in Chitungwiza on 13 December 2022, at the age of 80.

== See also ==
- Sculpture of Zimbabwe
