= Coster Balakasi =

Zimbabwean sculptor

- Born: Balakasi; 2 July 1972 (age 53); Harare
- Citizenship: Zimbabwe
- Occupation: Sculptor

Coster Balakasi (born 1972) is a Zimbabwean sculptor.

== Biography ==
Born in Harare to a Malawian father and Zimbabwean mother, he grew up in the Tafara area of the city, where he completed his primary and secondary schooling. In 1988 he began working with sculptors such as Miger Padaso and Dominic Benhura in Tafara. He began working with sculptor Cosmos Muchenje in Greendale, Hararae, 1993. In 1998 he left Muchenje's studio and began working on his own. In 1999 he was an artist-in-residence at the Chapungu Sculpture Park. He has exhibited in Canterbury and Spain as well as various locations in Zimbabwe. Balakasi passed on the tradition of Shona sculpture to his nephew, Gift Tembo.

His sculptures include "Seated Girl", which is currently being displayed at Knebworth House.

Balaksi is represented by York's Shona Gallery in New York and Ukama Gallery in Vancouver, BC.
