= Mariga =

Mariga is a surname. Notable people with the surname include:

- Daniel Mariga (1976–2006), Zimbabwean sculptor
- Joram Mariga (1927–2000), Zimbabwean sculptor
- McDonald Mariga (born 1987), Kenyan soccer player
