= Springstone =

Springstone can mean:

- Springer (architecture), the bottom-most element of an arch
- Springstone (material), an exceptionally hard, dark stone used in Shona sculpture
