= Bulelwa =

Bulelwa is a feminine given name. Notable people with this name include:

- Bulelwa Madekurozwa (born 1972), a Zambian-Zimbabwean painter and printmaker
- Bulelwa Mkutukana (1987–2023), better known as "Zahara", a South African musician
- Bulelwa Tinto, a South African politician
- Bulelwa Tunyiswa (born 1962), another South African politician
