= Ignatius Zhuwakiyi =

Zimbabwean sculptor

- Born: Ignatius; 1969 (age 55–56); Harare
- Citizenship: Zimbabwe
- Occupation: sculptor

Ignatius Zhuwakiyi (born 1969) is a Zimbabwean sculptor.

A native of Harare, Zhuwakiyi is the youngest of four, and grew up in St Mary's Township, Chitungwiza. There he attended local primary and secondary schools. He left high school after his second year. After meeting Locardia Ndandarika, he grew interest in sculpting, In 1989, he became involved with the Chapungu Sculpture Park. Along with Godfrey Machinjili, Vitalis Muchenje, and Axilia Tatisa, he exhibited at the "Young Generation" show at the John Boyne Gallery in 1990.
