= Lincon Muteta =

Zimbabwean sculptor

- Born: Lincon; 18 January 1975 (age 50); Harare
- Citizenship: Zimbabwe
- Occupation: Sculptor
- Years active: 1989

Lincon Muteta,(born 18 January 1975) is a Zimbabwean sculptor.

== Life ==
Muteta was born in 1975 in the Highfield area of Harare, the youngest of four children in a family originally from Mutoko. He began sculpting in 1989 while in secondary school in Harare, later becoming an assistant to Danny Kanyemba. He was encouraged to start work on his own as a full-time sculptor by Moses Masaya.

Muteta was a resident artist at the Chapungu Sculpture Park in 1996–97. During 2004–08, he travelled and exhibited in group exhibitions in South Africa, Bahrain, Dubai, England, and Canada with Zimsculpt. His works have also been exhibited in Spain, Germany, Holland, the United States, Switzerland, Ireland, Belgium and Italy. The British Museum has an example of his work in its permanent collection.

He is married with two daughters.
