= Celestino =

Celestino is both a surname and a given name. Notable people with the name include:

== Given name ==
- Celestino Alfonso (1916–1944), Spanish republican and volunteer in the French liberation army
- Celestino Bonifacio Bacalé (1957–2021), Equato-Guinean politician of the Convergence for Social Democracy (CPDS)
- Celestino Caballero (born 1976), professional boxer from Panama
- Celestino Cavedoni (1795–1865), Italian ecclesiastic, archæologist, and numismatist
- Celestino Corbacho (born 1949), Spanish politician, Minister of Labour and Immigration
- Celestino Migliore (born 1952), Italian archbishop of the Roman Catholic Church
- Celestino Mukavhi (born 1972), Zimbabwean sculptor
- Celestino Piatti (1922–2007), Swiss graphic artist, painter and book designer
- Celestino Rocha da Costa (1937–2010), former prime minister of São Tomé and Príncipe
- Celestino Rosatelli (1885–1945), Italian aeronautics engineer
- Celestino Sfondrati (1644–1696), Italian Benedictine theologian, Prince-abbot of St. Gall and Cardinal
- Celestino Soddu (born 1945), architect and professor of Generative Design at Politecnico di Milano university in Italy

== Surname ==
- Anthony Celestino, the touring bassist for the Blink-182 side project, Box Car Racer
- Edrian Paul Celestino, Filipino-Canadian figure skater
- Gilberto Celestino (born 1999), Dominican baseball player
- Jaime Celestino Dias Bragança (born 1983), Portuguese football player
- José Celestino Mutis (1732–1808), Spanish botanist and mathematician
- Mirko Celestino (born 1974), Italian former professional road racing cyclist
- Pedro Celestino Negrete (1777–1846), Spanish general in New Spain and later provisional president of Mexico
- Pedro Celestino Silva Soares (born 1987), Cape Verdean football player
- Rafael Celestino Benítez (1917–1999), highly decorated submarine commander

== See also ==
- Sergio Guadarrama, founder of Celestino Couture
