= Tafunga Bonjisi =

Zimbabwean sculptor

- Born: Bonjisi; 1982 (age 42–43)
- Citizenship: Zimbabwe
- Occupation: Sculptor
- Employer: springstone

Tafunga Bonjisi (born 1982) is a Zimbabwean sculptor.

== Biography ==
Born a twin in Ruwa, Bonjisi is the brother of sculptors Witness and Lameck Bonjisi; he attended primary school in Ruwa and high school in Tafara. He studied sculpture with Lameck before beginning a solo career in 2000. He has worked in cobalt and springstone, among other media.
