= John Groeber =

John Groeber (1903 – 1973) was a missionary who founded the Serima mission station for the Swiss Bethlehem Mission in Rhodesia (now Zimbabwe). He is best known for designing and building St. Mary's church on the Serima Mission grounds, and for training a number of artists and builders.

== Early life and education ==
Groeber was born in Basel, Switzerland to a family of bakers who were among the city's Catholic minority. Groeber himself was religious from a young age, and attended Mass and other religious activities on a regular basis. He was also a painter, largely self-taught. Due to the family's limited resources, Groeber's education was cut short and he went to work as a draughtsman when he was sixteen. In this work he learned the basics of both architecture and construction, and worked on such buildings as the Federal Charter Archive.

By the late 1920s Groeber felt unfulfilled and was increasingly driven to join the priesthood. Because he had been a poor student and had not completed high school, he joined the Swiss Bethlehem Mission (SBM) at Immensee. In 1930 he was able to matriculate, and began his studies at the SBM theological seminary. After several years of seminary, Groeber enrolled at the Kunstgewerbeschule Lucerne, where he studied art for several years (although he did not get a degree as his superiors would not allow him to take the mandatory life drawing course).

== Posting to Rhodesia ==
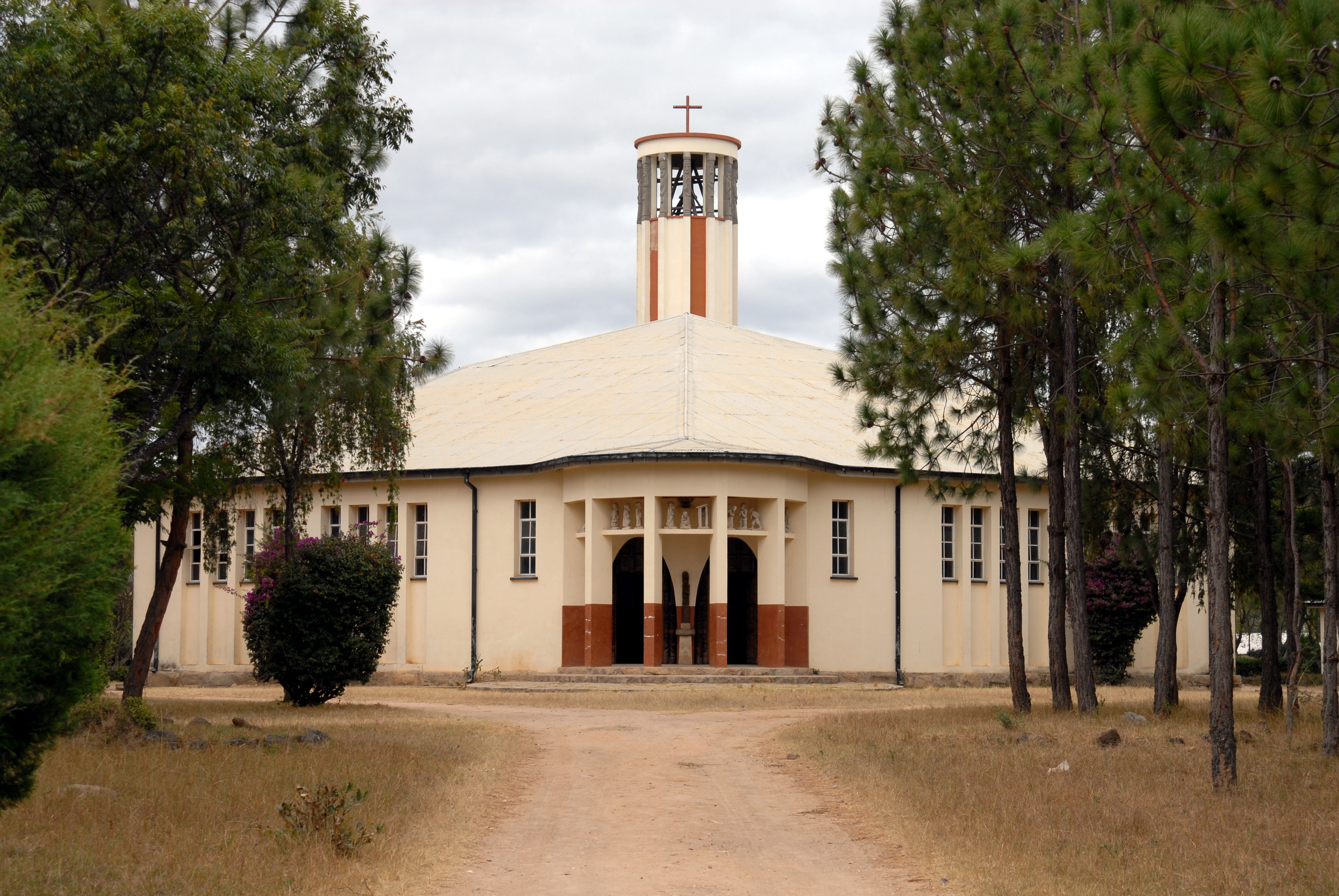
St Mary's Church, Serima Mission

After being ordained, the SBM posted Groeber to Rhodesia in 1939. During his early years in Rhodesia, he worked on a series of construction projects for the SBM. He asked his superiors to let him build and run his own mission with an arts-oriented school, and in 1948 was assigned a new, isolated mission station at Serima.

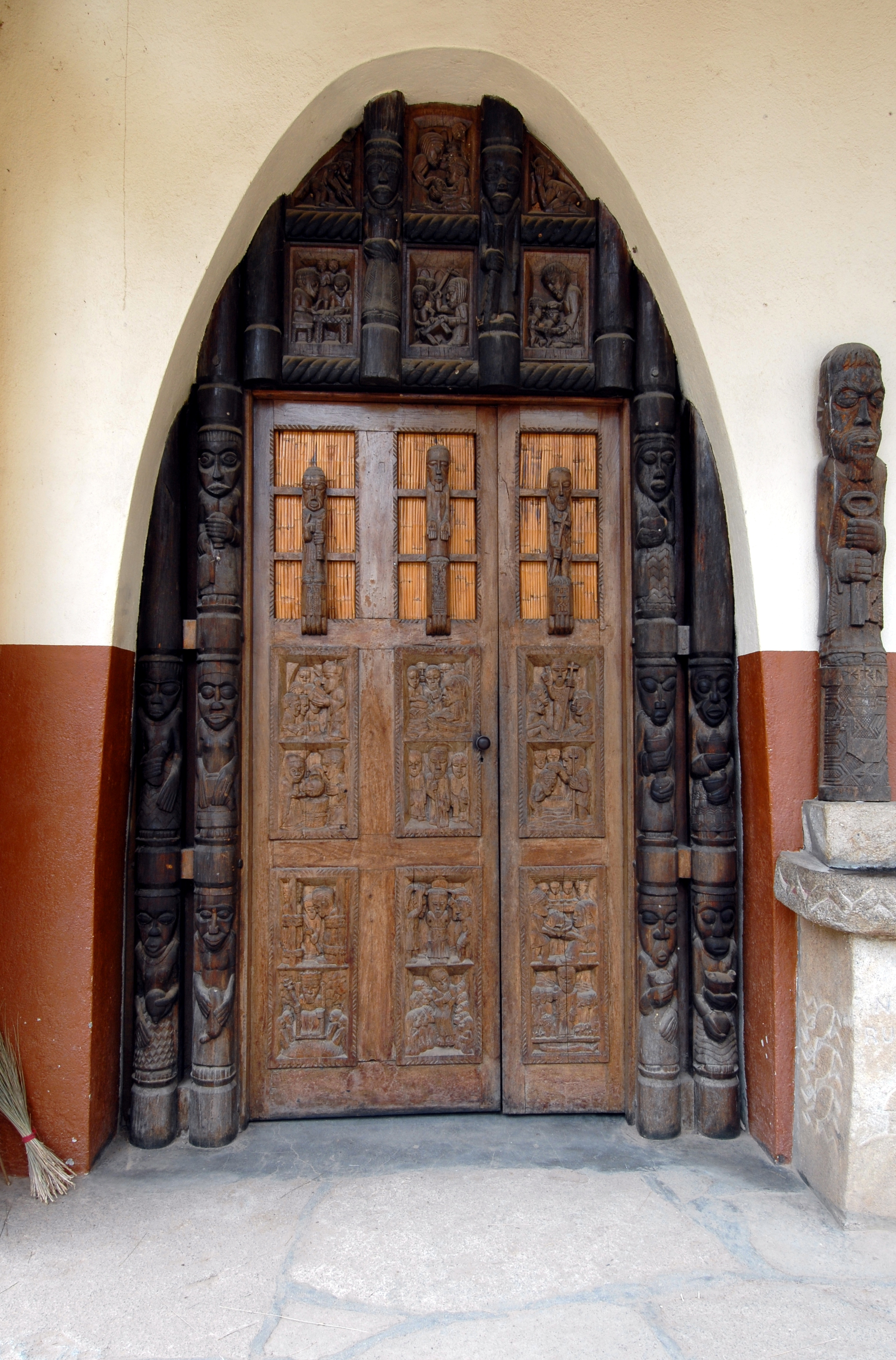
Doors of St Mary's Church, Serima Mission, Zimbabwe, carved by Cornelius Manguma

At Serima, Groeber was able to build up a congregation with more than a thousand local converts, while also mobilizing them to provide support and labor to develop the mission station. A large complex, including a boarding school and church, were built over two decades, using bricks fired in a massive kiln. Students with an aptitude for construction were given scholarships and worked in the afternoons. By 1956 the school was built, and Groeber moved on to the construction of St. Mary's Church. This church combined the use of a modern architectural plan (inspired in part by the Federal Charter Archive) with African carving and artwork in the interior spaces. All the Serima artists were trained from scratch by Groeber and his former pupil Cornelius Manguma. These artists, plucked from mandatory art classes, worked in the afternoons, and were trained in drawing, patterning, pit firing, and woodcarving. Once Groeber was satisfied with their technical abilities, they were assigned subjects to carve for the St. Mary's interior. The students were expected to create their own designs, which were approved if they fit in with the overall iconography.

The exterior of St. Mary's was completed in 1958, and the interior was completed in 1966. Today it is considered to be one of Zimbabwe's architectural masterpieces, featuring a unique design combined with hundreds of carvings, murals, and ecclesiastical artworks that combine a coherent statement of Africanized Catholicism.

== Serima artistic tradition ==
Groeber created a distinctive artistic style that made use of prescribed anatomical proportions, frontality, and Shona patterning. His most famous students were Joseph Ndandarika (who left Serima in 1959), Nicholas Mukomberanwa (left in 1960), and Cornelius Manguma (who taught art and carved much of the interior). In the early 1970s the Swiss Bethlehem Mission tried to preserve this tradition by posting Groeber and Manguma to Driefontein mission, where a carving school was established. This school opened in 1972 and still exists today. Manguma, who remained the head of the school for over a quarter of a century, continued to use most of Groeber's methods. His most famous student was Tapfuma Gutsa. The school has produced a vast array of religious carvings for clients all over the world.
