= Jonathan Mhondorohuma =

Zimbabwean sculptor

- Born: 25 December 1974 (age 50); Mvurwi
- Citizenship: Zimbabwe
- Occupation: Sculptor

Jonathan Mhondorohuma (born 25 December 1974) is a Zimbabwean sculptor.

== Background ==
A native of Mvurwi, Mhondorohuma attended primary school in his hometown, also completing his O levels there. In 1989 he was invited by his friend Square Chikwanda to come work at the Tengenenge Sculpture Community; he spent the next six months there learning from Chikwanda before moving to Harare. There he met and worked under Joseph Ndandarika, whose influence may still be seen in his work.

At Ndandarika's death in 1991, Mhondorohuma moved to Hatfield to work on his own. In 1997 he became an artist in residence at the Chapungu Sculpture Park.

Jonathan's sculptures have many familial ties, and relate very much to his three children, and his wife Faith.
