= Godfrey Kennedy =

Zimbabwean sculptor

- Born: Godfrey; 1974 (age 50–51)
- Citizenship: Zimbabwe
- Occupation: Sculptor
- Years active: 1992

Godfrey Kennedy (born 1974) is a Zimbabwean sculptor.

Kennedy began sculpting in 1992, working with his neighbor, John Type. His work is also influenced by that of Moses Masaya and Brighton Sango. Kennedy takes his subject matter from African history and culture.
