= Stanford Derere =

Zimbabwean sculptor

- Born: Stanford; 1972 (age 52–53); Chapeyama
- Citizenship: Zimbabwe
- Occupation: Sculptor
- Organization: National Gallery of Zimbabwe

Stanford Derere is a Zimbabwean sculptor.

== Biography ==
Born in the village of Chapeyama, Derere grew up playing with clay, later going to art school to learn to draw. From 1985 until 1986 he was a member of the BAT Workshop of the National Gallery of Zimbabwe. There he learned painting and printmaking; he won an award from the gallery in 1988. He later switched to sculpture, and has exhibited his work internationally; his sculptures are in the collection of the Chapungu Sculpture Park.
