= Ronika Tandi =

Zimbabwean sculptor

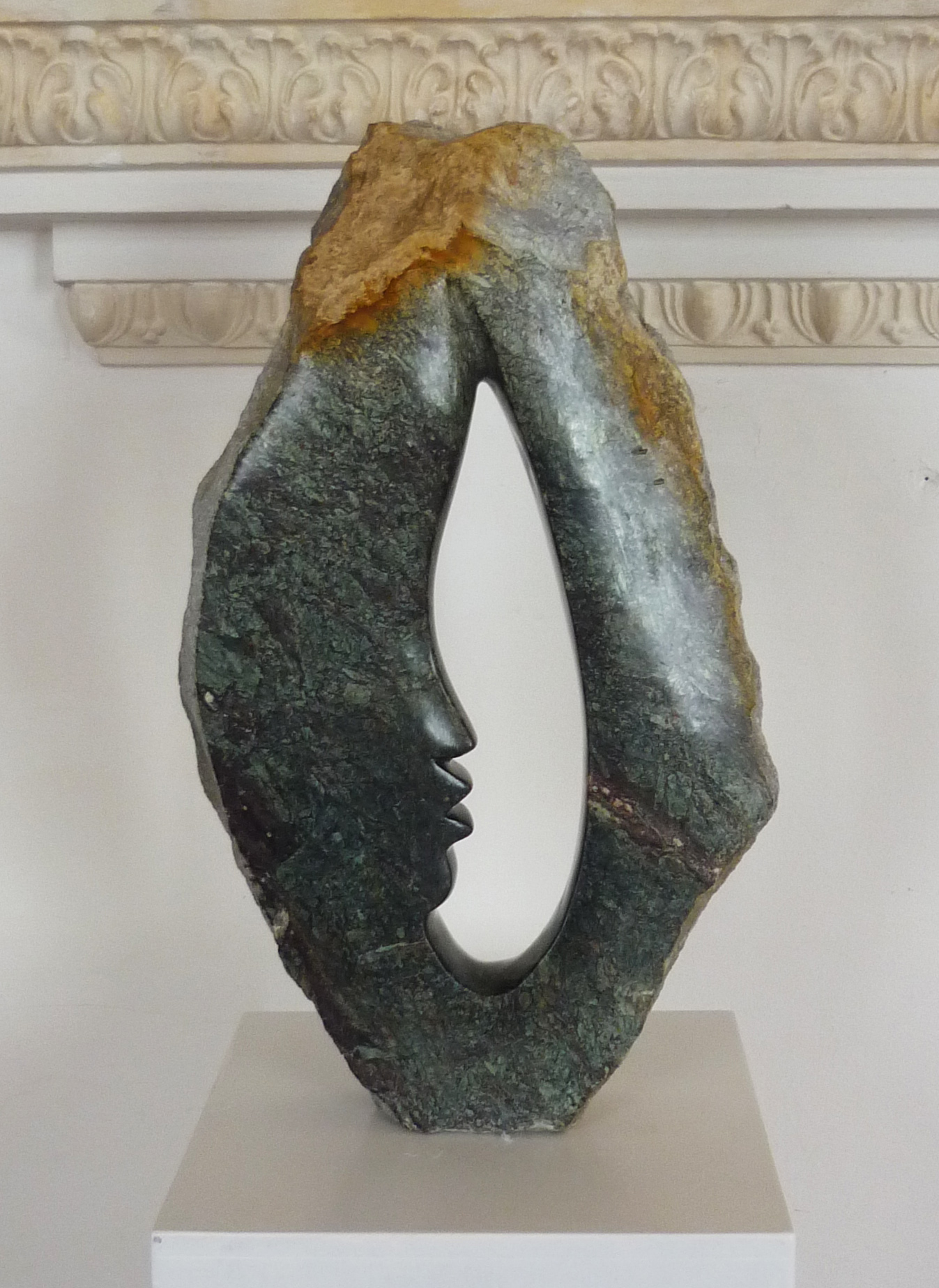
A sculpture by Ronika Tandi is displayed at Benediktbeuern Abbey.

Ronika Tandi (born 1975) is a Zimbabwean sculptor.

She is primarily known for her abstract stone carving, often with a rough, unpolished surface that retains the natural texture of the stone.

Tandi was born in Kariba, Zimbabwe, on the banks of Lake Kariba, in 1975. Many of her siblings also became stone carvers.

She studied at the National Gallery of Zimbabwe's BAT workshop from 2007 to 2008. Fellow Zimbabwean sculptor Eddie Masaya was an important influence early in her career.

In 2006, Tandi's work was displayed in the garden of the German Embassy in Harare. She splits her time between Zimbabwe and Germany, where she runs the Little Zim Art of Africa Gallery. In 2011, she represented the sculptors of Zimbabwe at the opening of the 54th Venice Biennale.

Along with the leaders of the Emerald Hill School for the Deaf, where she has volunteered since 2007, in 2011 Tandi founded the Shungu Arts Centre. The center is dedicated to employing the school's students and preparing them for a career in the arts. She is also the founder of the affiliated Takunda Shungu Trust, which helps educate deaf children and other children with disabilities, and promotes work by deaf artists.
