= Square Chikwanda =

Zimbabwean sculptor (born 1972)

Square Chikwanda (born 1972) is a Zimbabwean sculptor, living and working in Harare, Zimbabwe. He first learned his art from his father, also a Zimbabwean sculptor.

== Short Biography ==
Born in Mvurwi, Chikwanda moved to the Tengenenge Sculpture Community with his father at the age of seven. There his father taught him at an early age to wash and polish stone. He finished primary school and learned the art of sculpture to become a full-time artist at the age of thirteen, developing his own style. At the Community he had several students, of whom Jonathan Mhondorohuma became a good friend. In 1993 he left the community to work in Harare at the Chapungu Sculpture Park. At this park, Chikwanda continued expanding his artistic know-how, which made him one of the leading Harare sculptors. As of 2006, he works on his own in Chitungwiza, a Harare suburb. His work has been exhibited worldwide.

== Style ==
Chikwanda's sculptures deal mostly with portraits and animals e.g. "Blind Portrait", Berlin, Germany or "Hippo", Tengenenge, Zimbabwe. His figures are generally very square and stylised : arms, legs and fingers are often square and show hard lines; noses have knife sharp edges. His sculptures remind indeed the art-deco figures of the 1930-1940 and are always polished to a high degree of perfection. He uses local Zimbabawean stone, including springstone.

== Exhibitions ==
- Annual Heritage Exhibition, National Gallery, Harare, 1986, 1987, 1988, 1992, 1997.
- Museum for Humour and Satire, Bucharest, Bulgaria, 1988.
- National South-African Gallery, Overport, Durban, South Africa, 1991.
- Master Sculptors Of Zimbabwe, Art Center an der Friedrichstrasse, Berlin, Germany, October – December 2006
- Mestres Escultors de Zimbabwe, Museo Comarcal, Montsia d'Amposta, Spain, 21 May-21 June 2009.
- Master Sculptors Of Zimbabwe, Boserup Gallery, Boserupvej 100, Roskilde, Denmark, February 2010.
- Master Sculptors Of Zimbabwe, Sanomatalo Building, Helsinki, Finland, March 2010.
- Master Sculptors Of Zimbabwe, Friends For Ever Gallery, Friedrichstrasse 134, Berlin, Germany, May 2010.

== Permanent Collections ==
- Museum of Tengenenge, Zimbabwe.
- Chapungu Sculpture Park, Harare, Zimbabwe.
- Africa Museum, Berg en Dal, The Netherlands.
- British Museum
