= Biggie Kapeta =

Zimbabwean sculptor

- Born: 1956
- Died: 1999 (aged 42–43)
- Citizenship: Zimbabwe
- Occupation: Sculptor
- Relatives: Sylvester Mubayi

Biggie Kapeta (1956–1999) was a Zimbabwean sculptor. He was the nephew of Sylvester Mubayi, with whom he studied, and later spent two years as an artist in residence at the Chapungu Sculpture Park, where some of his work may be seen on display. He was the teacher of Sydney Majengwa.
