= Colleen Madamombe =

Zimbabwean sculptor (1964–2009)

- Born: 1964; Harare, Zimbabwe
- Died: May 31, 2009
- Known for: Sculpture
- Movement: Shona sculpture
- Awards: "Best Female Artist of Zimbabwe"

Colleen Madamombe (1964–2009) was a Zimbabwean sculptor working primarily in stone. Her work expresses themes of womanhood, motherhood, and tribal Matriarchy.

== Early life and education ==
Colleen Madamombe was born in 1964 in Salisbury, Rhodesia (now Harare, Zimbabwe following independence in 1980), and received her secondary education at school in Kutama between 1979 and 1984. She obtained a Diploma in Fine Arts at the BAT Workshop School of the National Gallery of Zimbabwe from 1985 to 1986. In 1986, she married the Zimbabwean sculptor Fabian Madamombe, with whom she later had seven children. Initially, she specialized in drawing and painting, but in 1987, she went to help her husband with his sculpting at Chapungu Sculpture Park, where she started stone carving. Colleen became close friends with fellow female sculptor Agnes Nyanhongo and rapidly developed her own style of sculpting in the three years she stayed full-time at Chapungu.

== Artwork ==
While some of her early work was inspired by observation of ants, bees, butterflies, and caterpillars, Colleen became best known for her depiction of women and their Shona culture. She illustrated many themes of womanhood: women at work, harvesting, carrying water or children, and giving birth. Her female figures quickly became a symbol of womanhood in Zimbabwe and were adopted by the Zimbabwean International Film Festival as the trophy award for all winning women entrants. She won the award “Best Female Artist of Zimbabwe” three times.

Colleen worked predominantly in Springstone (a local type of hard serpentine rock much used by Zimbabwean sculptors) but also used Opal stone (a softer variety of serpentine), for example, in her major work “The Birth”, now part of the Chapungu permanent collection. She used both rough and polished stone in her sculpture, often leaving parts of the surface of the stone in its raw oxidized form to provide color for hair or clothes, while creating expressive faces, arms, and hands in the fully polished black stone. Skirts would sometimes be chiseled to a rough grey surface, while other clothing, such as a blouse, was stippled to a finer texture. The overall effect and subject matter were instantly recognizable.

== Exhibitions ==
Many of Colleen’s works were exhibited and sold outside Zimbabwe. For example, they were included in travelling exhibitions of the work of Chapungu artists, which were shown in Botanical Gardens in the UK and the US. The catalogue “Chapungu: Culture and Legend – A Culture in Stone” for the exhibition at Kew Gardens in 2000 depicts Colleen’s sculptures “Growing Well” (a mother and baby in Springstone, 1997) on p. 28-29 and “Dancing Woman” (Opal Stone, 1993) on p. 64-65. Works in that exhibition included almost all the well-known “first-generation” of Zimbabwean sculptors, for example, Joram Mariga, Henry Munyaradzi, and Bernard Takawira. In this context, Colleen is usually described as being of the “second generation” but the terms are imprecise, as discussed by Celia Winter-Irving. In 2004, Colleen and Fabian Madamobe's sculpture was included in an exhibition at the Botanical Garden in Berlin. The catalog illustrates her life-sized works, “Playing Ball” and “Mother's Care”.

She died on May 31, 2009, and is buried near her rural home in Zvimba. In 2010, an exhibition about her life and works was held at the National Gallery of Zimbabwe.

== Awards ==
Best Female Artist of Zimbabwe

== See also ==
- Sculpture of Zimbabwe
