= Godfrey Mtenga =

Zimbabwean sculptor

- Born: Godfrey; 1965 (age 59–60); Guruve
- Citizenship: Zimbabwe
- Occupation: Sculptor
- Years active: 1987

Godfrey Mtenga (born c. 1965) is a Zimbabwean sculptor. A native of Chitaunhike in the Guruve district, he left school at 18 and began sculpting in 1987, working with Brighton Sango. After six months, he started to work on his own. He was featured in the Annual Exhibition at the National Gallery of Zimbabwe in 1989.
