= Witness Bonjisi =

Zimbabwean sculptor

- Born: 1975 (age 49–50); Mutoko
- Citizenship: Zimbabwe
- Occupation: Sculptor
- Relatives: Nicholas Mukomberanwa

Witness Bonjisi (born 1975) is a Zimbabwean sculptor.

A native of Mudzi, Mutoko, he was the second child in a family of second, and grew up in Domboshoava, Chinamhora. There he completed primary school before moving to Mabvuku, on the outskirts of Harare, and completing his secondary education. He began sculpting in 1992, working with his brother Lameck and with Nicholas Mukomberanwa; his brother Tafunga is also an artist. In 1997 he began to work on his own, and has since attended workshops in the United States and Switzerland. He is amongst some of the artists presently being represented and marketed by AVAC Arts (www.avacarts.com) a virtual online gallery promoting most Zimbabwean stone sculptors.
