= Anthony Sabuneti =

Zimbabwean sculptor (born 1974)

- Born: Anthony; 1974 (age 50–51); Harare
- Citizenship: Zimbabwe
- Occupation: Sculptor

Anthony Sabuneti (born 1974) is a Zimbabwean sculptor.

A native of Harare, Sabuneti was the last-born of six children; his mother was a potter, and he was greatly influenced by her work. He began his career at seven, making wire toys for sale to other children. These he displayed at the local Community Hall. He completed his O levels in Harare. Sabuneti and some friends formed the Gota Tochisuma Atelier in 1987; he still works with the group. He has exhibited at the National Gallery of Zimbabwe, and in group exhibitions internationally, including in the US.
