= Amos Supuni =

- Born: 1970; Malawi
- Died: December 2008 (aged 37–38); Mozambique
- Cause of death: homicide
- Citizenship: Zimbabwe
- Occupations: Sculptor, educator,

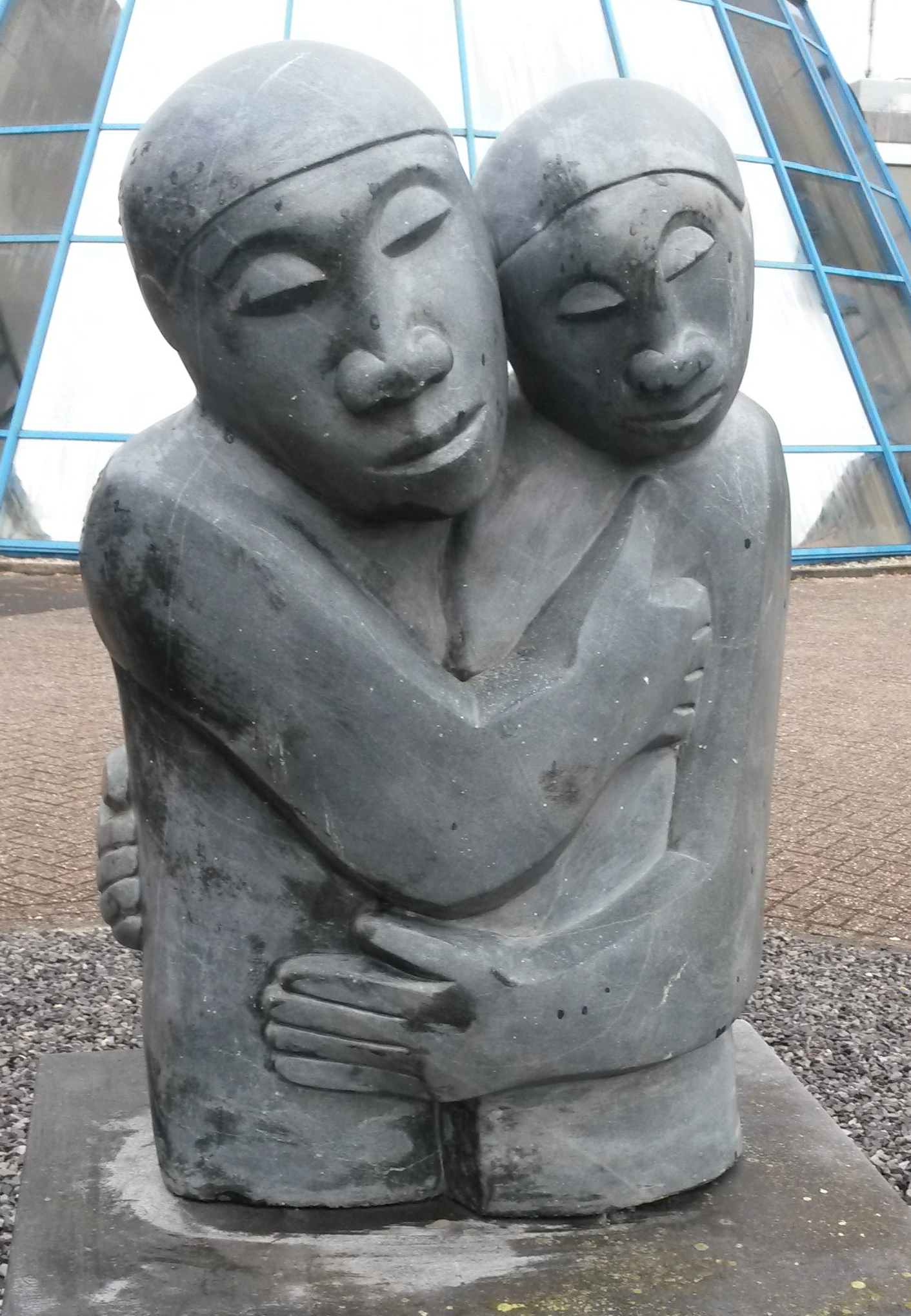
Reconciliation, statue in Woerden

Amos Supuni (1970–December 2008), was a Malawian-born Zimbabwean stone carver, sculptor, and educator.

== Biography ==
Amos Supuni was born in 1970 in Malawi. Supuni's parents moved to Zimbabwe when he was two months old.

In 1989 Supuni joined a Catholic youth group in Tafara, just outside Harare, where he received lessons in sculpture from Tapfuma Gutsa. The group later moved to Silvera House. In 1991, Supuni spent six months in Tanzania within a cultural exchange program. There he learnt various other techniques such as print making, lino cut and etching. After his return to Zimbabwe he continued work at Silvera House until 1996. Later he became artist-in-residence in Chapungu Sculpture Park. In the fall of 1999, Amos was artist in residence at Florida Southern College where he created sculptures and taught a stone sculpture class.

In 2002, Supuni went to Utah to teach stone carving.

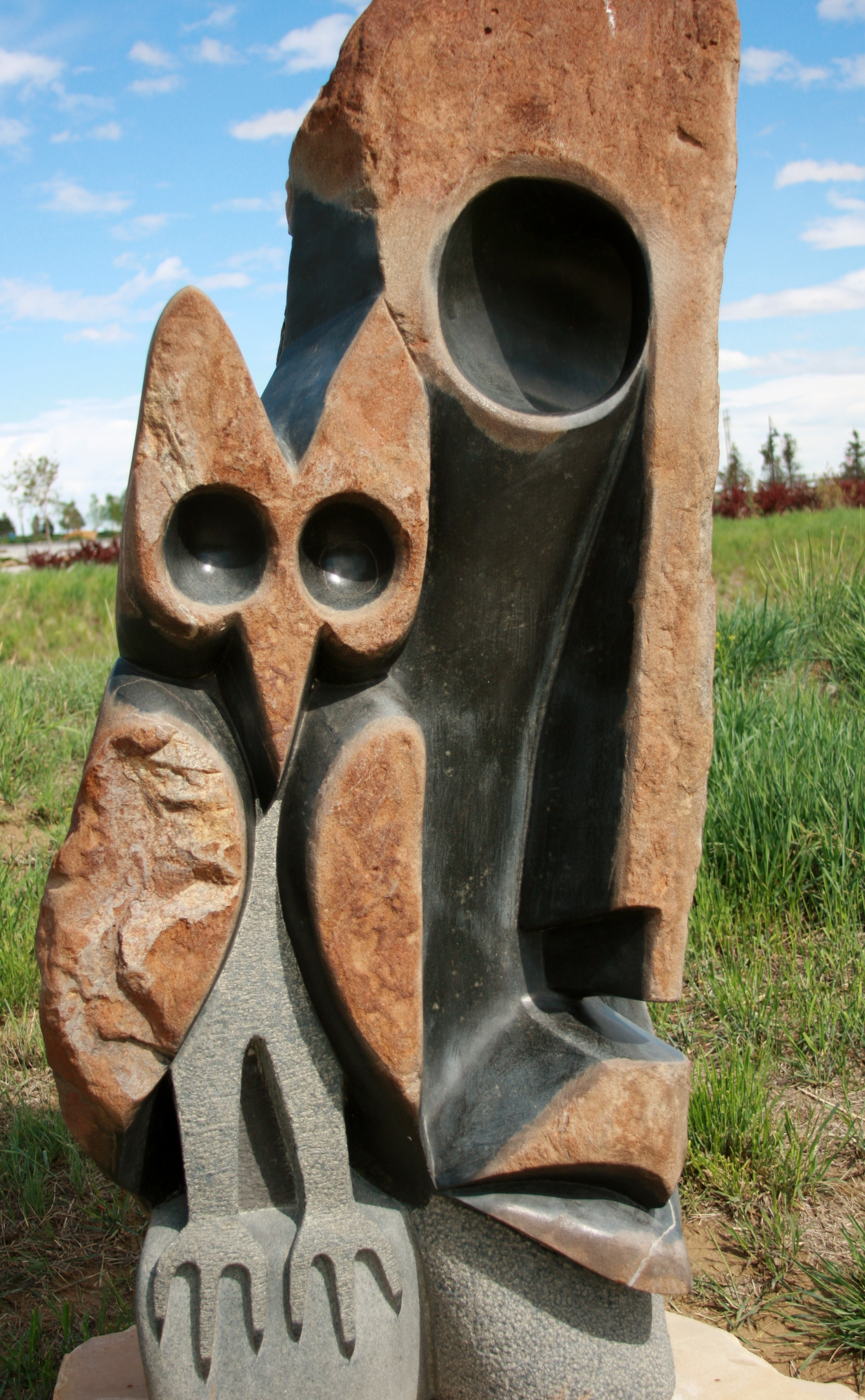
N'anga and His Owl, by Amos Supuni. At night the N'anga (traditional healer) sends his owl to learn the secrets of the village

Supuni died in December 2008 in Mozambique, before turning age 40 and he left a widow. He was killed in search of food for his family in neighboring Mozambique.

== Work ==
In his work Supuni refers to contemporary social issues concerning street kids, homelessness and poverty. On the other side, his images show joy, such as the pride of a father holding his newborn child. In addition he uses cultural icons in his work.

Supuni made his sculptures mostly in the hard springstone, but also used mixed media, such as a fusion of wood, stone and metal in his work Hwata (secretary bird), which was displayed on Atlanta airport.

== Used sources ==
1. University of Cape Town, Amos Supuni
2. Utonga Gallery
3. University of Utah
4. Atlanta Airport Art Program Zimbabwe
5. Alta Community Enrichment
