= Collin Sixpence =

Zimbabwean sculptor

- Born: Collin; 1974 (age 50–51)
- Citizenship: Zimbabwe
- Education: Tafara
- Occupation: Sculptor
- Era: 1989

Collin Sixpence (born c. 1974) is a Zimbabwean sculptor.

== Biography ==
Born to parents from Mozambique, Sixpence began his studies in Tafara, finishing his O levels in Harare. In Tafara he was inspired to attempt stonecarving by Tapfuma Gutsa and Dominic Benhura, who lived in the area. He began working as an assistant to Migeri Padoso in 1986, moving to work with Cosmos Muchenje in 1987. In 1989 he became an artist in residence at the Chapungu Sculpture Park. He was coached at Talent Village Sculpture Garden in Zimbabwe.

Sixpence has exhibited in Germany, France, Holland, England, South Africa, Korea, China and Japan; in 2005 he was invited to participate in a workshop as part of Expo 2005 in Nagoya.
