= Mary McFadden =

American fashion designer (1938–2024)

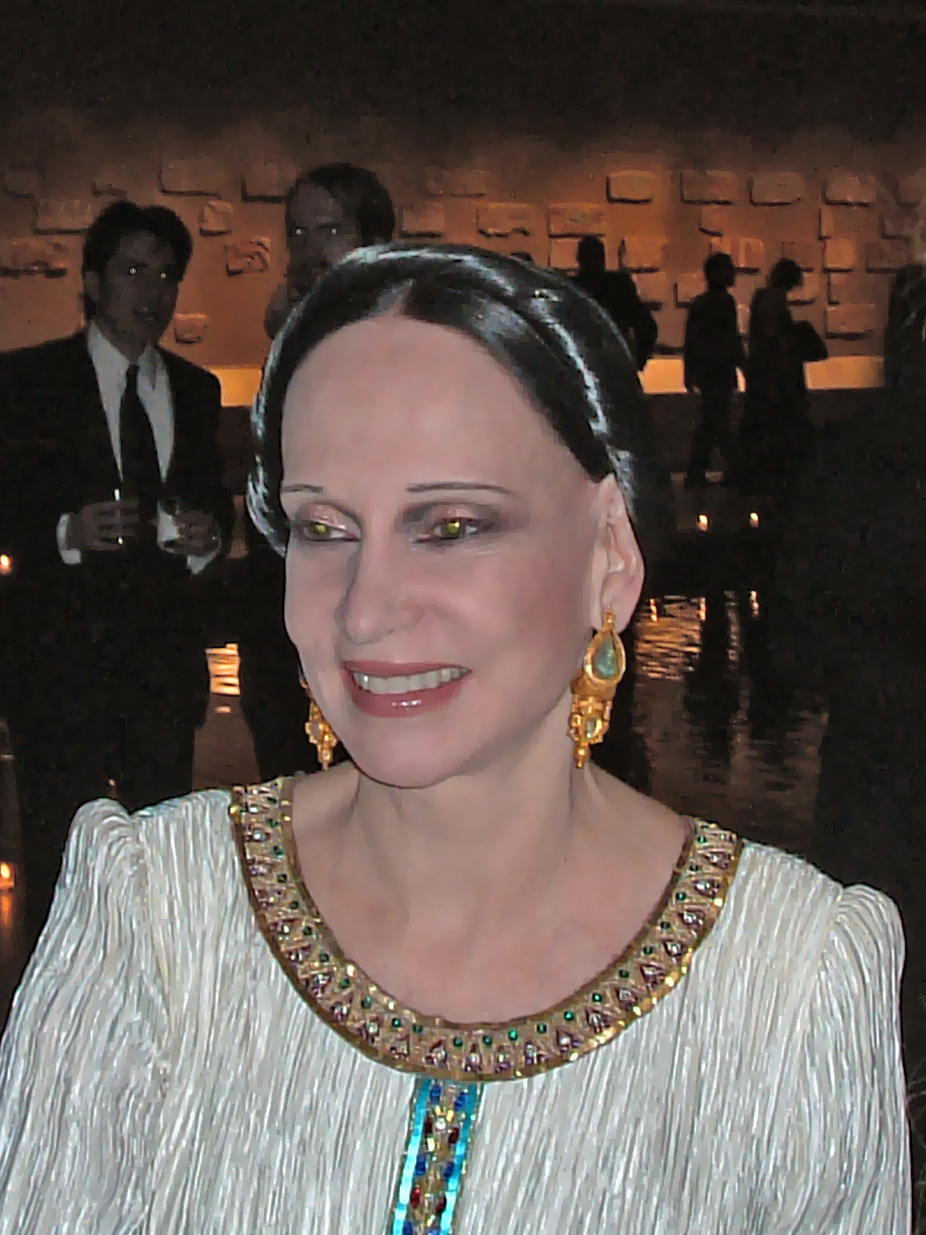
- McFadden in 1999
- Born: October 1, 1938; New York City, U.S.
- Died: September 13, 2024 (aged 85); Southampton, New York, U.S.
- Occupation: Designer
- Spouses: Philip Harari (m. 1964, divorced); Frank McEwen (m. 1969; div. 1970); Armin Schmidt (divorced); Kohle Yohannan (m. 1989; div. 1992); Vasilos Calitsis (m. 1996, divorced)
- Children: 1

Mary McFadden (October 1, 1938 – September 13, 2024) was an American fashion designer of women's clothing and other high-fashion items, including historically inspired form-fitting dresses.

== Early life and education ==
McFadden was born on October 1, 1938, in Manhattan, New York, and spent the early part of her childhood on a cotton plantation outside Memphis, Tennessee. When she was nine, her father died in an avalanche while he was skiing in Aspen, Colorado. Afterwards, the family moved to Westbury, New York, and she was sent to the Foxcroft School, from which she graduated. She went on to attend Columbia University, the Ecole Lubec, the New School for Social Research, the Sorbonne, and the Traphagen School of Fashion (1956, Costume Design).

== Career ==
Between 1962 and 1964, McFadden worked as public relations director at Christian Dior in New York and Paris. Since she knew nothing about publicity, she made an agreement that she would be paid in the form of 50 dresses per year from Dior-New York and Dior-Paris instead of money. She then married Philip Harari, a merchant for De Beers. She relocated to South Africa in the same year and Diana Vreeland arranged for her to become an editor for Vogue South Africa. She was in this position until 1966 when the magazine was closed. She then worked for The Rand Daily Mail as a travel and political columnist. She was also a freelance editor for Vogue Paris between 1968 and 1970.

In 1976, McFadden began the clothing company Mary McFadden Inc. The company was noted for the McFadden-designed pleated dresses, which draped "like liquid gold" down a woman's body similar to those on the caryatids at the Acropolis. The dresses were similar to the earlier work of Henriette Negrin and Mariano Fortuny. The Metropolitan Museum of Art Costume Institute curator Harold Koda deemed her a "design archaeologist" for her historically inspired work. The dresses were made from Marii, a synthetic charmeuse patented by McFadden in 1975 that was made in Australia, dyed in Japan, and then machine-pressed in the United States. The dresses were popular with socialites including Jacqueline Kennedy Onassis. The company closed in 2002.

McFadden was the first female president of the Council of Fashion Designers of America, serving from 1982 to 1983.

In 2012, McFadden and her companion Murray Gell-Mann published the book Mary McFadden: A Lifetime of Design, Collecting, and Adventure.

McFadden also licensed her name to many products such as eyewear, footwear, home furnishings, and sleepwear.

In 2024, Drexel University staged an exhibition of her fashion creations titled Modern Ritual: The Art of Mary McFadden.

== Personal life ==
McFadden claimed to be married at least eleven times, but declared that some of these marriages were "only spiritual".

McFadden is known to have been married to, in chronological order:

- Philip Harari (married 1964, divorced). They were married in Saint Bartholomew's Protestant Episcopal Church in New York City, and McFadden's attendants included Warhol star Baby Jane Holzer.
- Frank McEwen (married 1969, divorced 1970), museum director
- Armin Schmidt (later divorced)
- Kohle Yohannan (married 1989, divorced 1992), historian
- Vasilos Calitsis (married 1996, later divorced), Greek director

McFadden had a daughter, Justine Harari, from her marriage to Philip Harari.

Mary McFadden died from myelodysplasia at her home in Southampton, New York, on September 13, 2024, at the age of 85.

== Awards ==
- Coty Award, 1976
- Award of Excellence from the president of the Friends of Moore Ronald G. Dowd, 1977
- Coty Award, 1978
- Coty Hall of Fame induction, 1979
- Neiman Marcus Fashion Award, 1979
- American Printed Fabrics Council Tommy Award, 1984
- Council of Fashion Designers of America Lifetime Achievement Award, 1988
- American Printed Fabrics Council Tommy Award, 1991
- Council of Fashion Designers of America Industry Tribute Award, 1993
- Moore College of Art & Design Visionary Woman Award, 2008
- United Nations Women Together Award, 2013
- Included in the International Best Dressed List Hall of Fame
- Named on the Eleanor Lambert Vanity Fair Best Dressed List
- Named the first "Living Landmark" from the New York Landmarks Conservancy
- President's Fellow Award of the Rhode Island School of Design
