= Dudzai Mushawepwere =

Zimbabwean sculptor

- Born: 1974 (age 50–51); Mutoko
- Citizenship: Zimbabwe
- Occupation: Sculptor
- Years active: 1990

Dudzai Mushawepwere (born 1974) is a Zimbabwean sculptor.

== Background ==
A native of Mutoko, Mushawepwere is the youngest of four, and grew up in Chitungwiza. Here he completed his primary schooling, showing early signs of an artistic bent. He began sculpting in 1990, working as an assistant to John Type. After two years he set up on his own. Much of his subject matter is inspired by his own cultural heritage. Mushawepwere has exhibited in Europe and the United States.
