= Lucky Office =

Zimbabwean sculptor (born 1976)

- Born: 1976 (age 48–49); Hurungwe District
- Citizenship: Zimbabwe
- Occupation: Sculptor

Lucky Office (born 1976) is a Zimbabwean sculptor.

A native of the Hurungwe District, Office began sculpting at age 19 after meeting Moses Masaya. The two men worked together for two years before Office struck out on his own. Many of his subjects are drawn from family experiences, particularly tragedies and the emotions he has felt during difficult situations.

His works have been exhibited in galleries in Harare, but also internationally in countries such as the United States, the UK, Netherlands, Belgium and Germany. One of his notable works is the sculpture “ Serious Thoughts ”, an anvil shaped sculpture with a face measuring 50 inches by 9 inches.
