= Daniel Mariga =

Zimbabwean sculptor

- Born: 1976
- Died: 2006 (aged 29–30)
- Citizenship: Zimbabwe
- Occupation: Sculptor
- Years active: 1998
- Father: Joram Mariga

Daniel Mariga (c. 1976–2006) was a Zimbabwean sculptor.

The third son of Joram Mariga, Mariga began sculpting while still at school. He began by helping his father finish his work. He was trained in the art of the Shona people, which informed his style. He began sculpting full-time after completing school; in 1995 he showed with other members of his family at the Chapungu Sculpture Park, where he became an artist in residence in 1998. In 1999 he began to exhibit in Europe, traveling to the Netherlands, Belgium, and Sweden. He died in 2006.
