= Eddie Masaya =

Zimbabwean sculptor (born 1960)

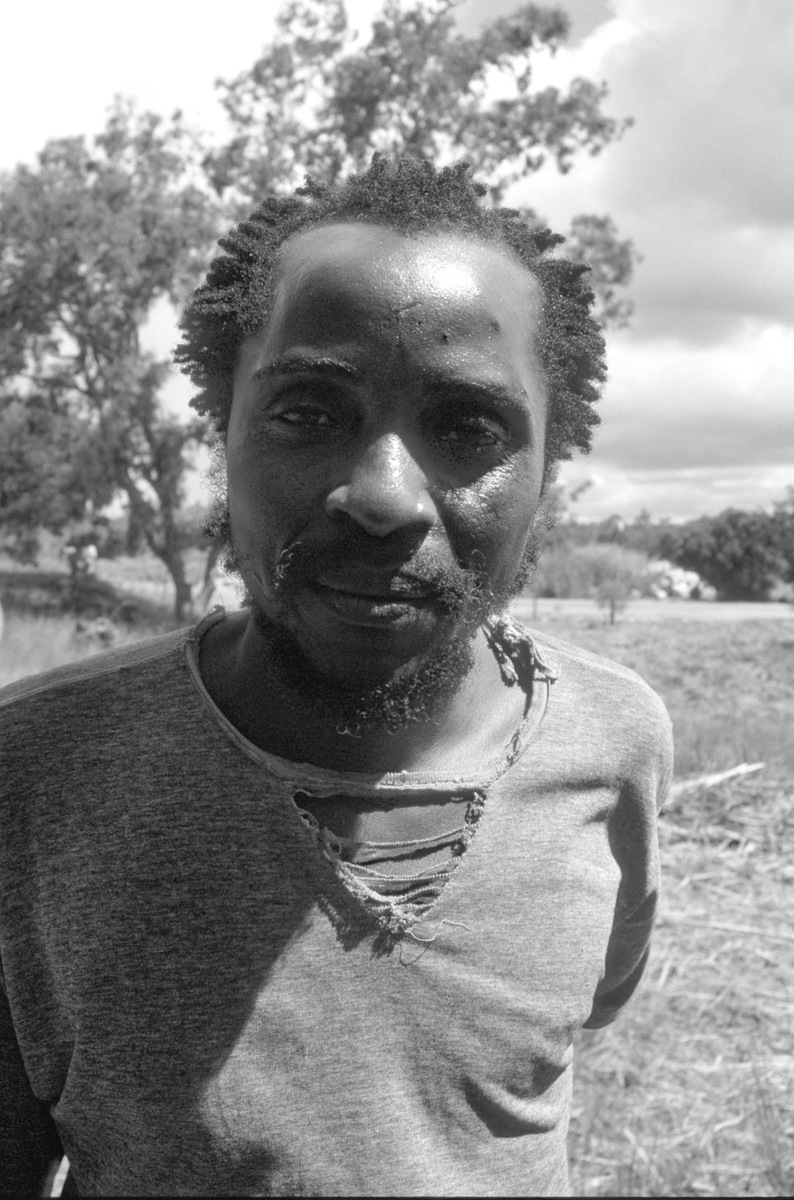
- Born: Eddie; 1960 (age 65–66); Nyanga
- Citizenship: Zimbabwe
- Occupation: Sculptor
- Years active: 1982
- Relatives: Moses

Eddie Masaya (born 1960) is a Zimbabwean sculptor.

== Biography ==
Born in the Nyanga district, Masaya showed little interest in sculpture until, while at school, he found a copy of The African Times containing an article about Zimbabwean stone sculpture. The article featured numerous artists, including Claud Nyanhongo and Bernard Manyandure; it also mentioned Masaya's cousin Moses. This was the first Eddie had heard of his cousin's profession, and he soon determined to travel to Harare upon completion of his schooling and ask to work with his cousin. In 1980 he did so, spending two years studying and working with Moses. Together the men showed at the John Boyne Gallery in 1981. In 1982, Masaya went to Guruve to work with Brighton Sango, a relationship which ended with the latter's death in 1995.

Masaya was among the first of the second generation of Zimbabwean sculptors to break away from the stylistic restraints imposed by earlier artists. His works are known for their ghostly quality, and are rougher in textures than those of the previous generation. He has exhibited worldwide, and his work may be seen at the Chapungu Sculpture Park.
