= Sanwell Chirume =

Zimbabwean sculptor

- Born: 6 August 1941 (age 84)
- Citizenship: Zimbabwe
- Occupation: Sculptor
- Employer: Tengenenge Sculpture Community

Sanwell Chirume (born 6 August 1941) is a Zimbabwean sculptor. His work, though derived to an extent from that of the Shona people, is highly personal in nature. Chirume lives and works at the Tengenenge Sculpture Community — his artistic output may be found in the collections of the Chapungu Sculpture Park.
