= Maxwell Mutanda =

Zimbabwean artist and designer

Maxwell Mutanda (born 1983) is a Zimbabwean artist, designer, design researcher, and businessperson. He is the co-founder of the design firm Studio [D] Tale, based out of London, Harare, and Cape Town, South Africa. Mutanda uses collage and architectural practice to make sustainable participatory design.

== Early life and education ==
Born in Harare, Zimbabwe in 1983, Mutanda studied at the Bartlett School of Architecture in London. In 2020, he received an MSc degree in sustainable urban development and Sheehan Scholarship at the University of Oxford.

== Career ==
Muntanda co-founded Studio [D] Tale with his design partner, Safia Qureshi. Online magazine Design Indaba writes that Studio [D] Tale “experiments across disciplines with a portfolio that includes architecture, urban exploration, production innovation to critical design and communications.” The firm designed vendor upgrades for Harare street vendors in 2016. The same year, It was working a way to create "pop-up churches" inspired by catholics in the Philippines holding mass in empty malls. Mutanda received a fellowship from IdeasCity New Orleans, an initiative of the New Museum in New York, the Africa’sOut! Artist-in-Residence at Denniston Hill, New York (2018), and the British Council’s ColabNowNow Residency, in Maputo, Mozambique. In 2020, he received an Eyebeam fellowship to study the "mobile data gap in sub-Saharan Africa". Also in 2020, he received a grant from the Graham Foundation for his project (In)Voluntary Mutations. In the 2020–2021 season, Mutanda was awarded a fellowship from the Akademie Schloss Solitude.

== Exhibitions ==
Mutanda's work was featured at the Louisiana Museum of Modern Art, in Copenhagen, Denmark and the Arc en Rêve Centre d'Architecture, Bordeaux, France, both in 2015. In addition, the work of Studio [D] Tale was in the Oslo Architecture Triennale in Oslo, Norway in 2019, the Biennale Architettura, Venice in 2014 and 2016, the Chicago Architecture Biennial and the London Design Festival in 2015.
