= Wallen Mapondera =

Zimbabwean artist (born 1985)

Wallen Mapondera (born 1985 in Harare, Zimbabwe) is a Zimbabwean visual artist.

== Recognition ==
- 2015, Winner in Visual Arts, National Arts Merit Award
- 2012, 1st Prize in Illustration and Graphics, Family, Tradition and Religion, an art exhibition and competition sponsored by the European Union, Gallery Delta, Harare
- 2010, nominee, National Arts Merit Awards (NAMA)

== Exhibitions ==
=== Solo exhibitions ===
- 2014, SOCIAL ZOOMETRY, Gallery Delta, Harare, Zimbabwe
