= Benard Nkanjo =

Zimbabwean sculptor (born 1970)

- Born: Bernard; 28 September 1970 (age 55); Harare
- Citizenship: Zimbabwe
- Occupation: Sculptor
- Relatives: Garrison Machinjili

Benard Nkanjo (born September 28, 1970) is a Zimbabwean sculptor.

Born in the Highfield area of Harare, Nkanjo would visit his relative Garrison Machinjili while he was in school. Machinjili was a sculptor, and Nkanjo studied with him for three years before leaving to work on his own. Currently he lives and works in Chitungwiza.

Nkanjo's stone of choice for carving is serpentinite.
