= Sam Songo =

Rhodesian artist

Samuel Songo
- Born: 1929; Rhodesia
- Died: 1977 (aged 47–48)
- Citizenship: Zimbabwe
- Occupation: Sculptor

Samuel Songo (1929 – c. 1977) was a Rhodesian artist, known for his works depicting African iconography and traditional African life. Songo was disabled and used a wheelchair. He spent most of his life working through the Cyrene Mission School, producing art on the behest of Frank McEwen, a British expatriate who helped establish and later ran the Rhodesian National Gallery of Art (now the National Gallery of Zimbabwe). Songo's early work consisted of occasional paintings and sculpture, however, in later years, he worked almost exclusively in the classic traditions of Shona stone sculpture.

In 1946, Songo was the chief subject of a British Documentary film entitled "Pitaniko, the film of Cyrene".

In 1954, Songo was featured in a Time magazine piece entitled "Wonderstone Wonders".

Many of Songo's works were exhibited in the National Gallery of Rhodesia, the Museum of Modern Art in 1968, the Musée Rodin in 1971, and London's Institute of Contemporary Arts in 1972. Many were also sold to private collections and museums in England".
