= Thomas Mukarobgwa =

Zimbabwean painter and sculptor

- Born: 1924; Nyanga
- Died: 1999 (aged 74–75); Harare
- Citizenship: Zimbabwe
- Occupations: Sculptor, painter
- Notable work: Spirit Bird carrying People

Thomas Mukarobgwa (1924–1999) was a Zimbabwean painter and sculptor who worked as a gallery attendant for much of his career.

Mukarobgwa was born in Nyanga, in the countryside of what was then Southern Rhodesia, and had limited education. He is believed to have taken his first art classes with Ned Paterson at school in Salisbury. With his interest in art piqued he met Frank McEwen, the newly appointed director of the National Gallery of Zimbabwe. McEwen hired him as a gallery attendant and gave him artistic materials, inviting him to join an art school which was then being formed in the basement of the museum. Mukarobgwa thus became one of the original members of what was to become known as the Workshop School. Mukarobgwa acted as a kind of gatekeeper for McEwen, finding young men to join the workshop who fitted into McEwen's preferred profile. In particular, McEwen preferred to have uneducated, pagans who could act as tabula rasa for his artistic training theories. Mukarobgwa seems to have trained those who did not fit this profile to pretend that they did and cover up various aspects of their backgrounds.

Mukarobgwa began his artistic career as a painter, and was one of McEwen's early standouts along with Joseph Ndandarika. He exhibited regularly in the early 1960s, and had four works acquired by MoMA in 1962. but turned towards sculpture as this medium took off amongst his peers; he returned to painting only in the early 1990s.

One of his sculptural works, called Spirit Bird carrying People was the 35c value in a set of postage stamps issued on 14 April 1988 to celebrate the 30th Anniversary of the opening of the National Gallery. Mukarobgwa kept working as a gallery attendant until his retirement in 1997. He planned to devote his remaining years to painting at his country house, but he died in Harare before getting the chance.

Mukarobgwa's art was inspired by his native landscape and by the legends and culture of the Shona people, from whom he was descended. His compositions were simple, and frequently used bright colors and bold contrasts. His sculptures were generally more rounded and smooth, with minimal carving into their surfaces.
