= Garrison Machinjili =

Zimbabwean sculptor (born 1963)

- Born: Garrison; 1963 (age 61–62); Mazoe
- Citizenship: Zimbabwe
- Occupation: Sculptor
- Known for: art of sculpture

Garrison Machinjili (born 1963) is a Zimbabwean sculptor. He has been working at the Chapungu Sculpture Park since 1989, and has collaborated with many contemporary Zimbabwean sculptors, such as Charles Backford and Benard Nkanjo. His sculptures are generally abstract in nature, but are derived from natural subjects. arrison Machinjili Garrison was born in 1963 in Mazoe, Zimbabwe. He is related to the groundbreaking second-generation Zimbabwean sculptor, Tapfuma Gutsa, and it was during a visit to Tapfuma that he was introduced to stone sculpture. Garrison worked with Tapfuma in 1986. Initially, he sanded and polished sculptures in the final stages of completion. Later, he made his own sculptures, and found a strong personal style emerging during this inspiring early period. In late 1987, he had established his name as an important new talent in the Zimbabwean art scene, and he was invited to join the prestigious Chapungu Sculpture Village as a resident artist, where he remained until 1991 and returning again in 1999–2000. Group exhibitions include: - "African Odyssey: 50 Years of Zimbabwean Stone Sculpture", OXO Gallery, London, UK (2006) - "Custom and Legend: A Culture In Stone", Kew Gardens, London, UK (2000) - Inaugural exhibition at the Chapungu Gallery, Melbourne, Australia (1998) - Zuva Gallery, Scottsdale, Arizona, USA (1998
