= George Nene =

George Nene (1959–2005) was one of Zimbabwe's best known artists. In 1988 his contributions to the nation were memorialized on a Zimbabwean stamp.

His earliest training in art was more than modest, as he first began sketching under the tutelage of South African artist 'Thami'; Thamsanga Mnyele, while serving a prison sentence for armed robbery in Gaborone, Botswana. During that time, he was also a Zimbabwe African People's Union (ZAPU) guerrilla. Nonetheless, his art became well known enough that he exhibited at the National Museum as part of a two-man show, while completing his eight-year sentence.

Nene created most of his work in acrylics and watercolor. Much of George Nene's art was inspired by 'traditional daily life', such as that portrayed on the book cover for "Art from the Frontline: Contemporary Art from Southern Africa" and by religious themes. One example is a mural painted in a small church near Bulawayo, titled "Birth of Christ the King of Peace" Some of his paintings were displayed and sold from the Mzilikazi Arts and Crafts Centre on the outskirts of Bulawayo. Nene's artistic contributions were also recognized by the Catholic Church in Zimbabwe.

In December 2005, Nene died in Gokwe.

== See also ==
- List of people on stamps of Zimbabwe
