= Workington, Harare =

Coordinates: 17°51′S 31°01′E

Workington is an industrial suburb in the South West of Harare, Zimbabwe.

The district has been the site of several high-profile robberies. In September 2022, robbers broke into a building and stole US$71,000. The following February, armed robbers stole a vehicle and $42,000. In July, a warehouse in the district was robbed of US$25,000. In February 2025, armed robbers gained entry to a business and stole US$120,400.
