= Lameck Bonjisi =

Zimbabwean sculptor

- Born: 1973
- Died: 8 November 2004 (aged 30–31)
- Citizenship: Zimbabwe
- Occupation: Sculptor

Lameck Bonjisi (1973 – 8 November 2004) was a Zimbabwean sculptor.

The brother of Witness and Tafunga Bonjisi, both of whom he mentored, Bonjisi began sculpting full-time at 17. He worked as an assistant to Nicholas Mukomberanwa before setting out independently. He died at 30.
