= Onias Mupumha =

Zimbabwean sculptor (born 1978)

- Born: 23 February 1978 (age 48)
- Citizenship: Zimbabwe
- Occupation: Sculptor
- Awards: National Arts Merit Awards

Onias Mupumha (born 23 February 1978) is a Zimbabwean sculptor. He is the winner of the 2008 NAMA (National Arts Merit Awards) awarded by Zimbabwe's National Arts Council.
