= Bernard Manyandure =

Zimbabwean sculptor

- Born: 1942; Nyanga, Zimbabwe
- Died: 1999 (aged 57)
- Known for: Sculpture

Bernard Manyandure (1929–1999) was a Zimbabwean sculptor.

Manyandure was born in Nyanga, and derived much of his subject from local folklore. He was among the first sculptors associated with Frank McEwen's Workshop School, remaining with it from its founding in 1957 until 1973. Initially a commercial farmer, he later turned full-time to sculpture. His works were featured in the first major exhibits of Zimbabwean sculpture in Paris and London, and were shown at the Museum of Modern Art in New York City.
