= Makina Kameya =

Angolan-born Zimbabwean sculptor

- Born: 1920; Angola
- Died: 1988 (aged 67–68); Tengenenge, Zimbabwe
- Known for: Sculpture

Makina Kameya (1920–1988) was an Angola-born Zimbabwean sculptor. An ethnic Mbundu, who spoke Portuguese and English, he moved to Zimbabwe in the 1960s, and spent most of his career at the Tengenenge Sculpture Community, where he died, having never fully recovered from severe injuries incurred when one of his sculptures fell and crushed his pelvis and legs. His works are on display at the Chapungu Sculpture Park.
