= Doreen Sibanda =

- Occupations: Artist and Arts Administrator

Doreen Sibanda is a UK-born Zimbabwean artist, curator and arts administrator. She has been the executive director of the National Gallery of Zimbabwe since 2004.

== Background ==
Sibanda was born in the United Kingdom to Jamaican parents. Her parents encouraged her to opt for a career in Education as an art teacher. She is married to Dr Misheck Sibanda.

== Career ==
Doreen Sibanda's work has been exhibited in a number of different countries such as the Czech Republic, Russia and Zimbabwe. This led her move to Zimbabwe in 1981–88, assuming an administrative role at the National Gallery of Zimbabwe as its first Educational Officer.

Sibanda has written and edited a number of books, including Zimbabwe Stone Sculpture: A retrospective, 1957-2004, The Zimbabwe Integrated Teacher Education Course (1982), and Mawonero: Modern and Contemporary Art in Zimbabwe (2015).
