= Boira Mteki =

Zimbabwean sculptor

- Born: Boira; 1946; Harare
- Died: 1991 (aged 44–45)
- Citizenship: Zimbabwe
- Occupation: Sculptor
- Relatives: Richard Mteki

Boira Mteki (1946–1999), was a Zimbabwean sculptor and educator.

A native of Harare, Mteki was among the founder members of Frank McEwen's Workshop School, and was among the first of its sculptors to use the harder native stones, such as serpentinite, granite, limestone, and springstone, which were then available. His works are currently in the collections of the National Gallery of Zimbabwe and the Chapungu Sculpture Park.
