= Joseph Muzondo =

Zimbabwean painter and sculptor (born 1953)

- Born: Joseph; 1953 (age 72–73); Zimbabwe
- Citizenship: Zimbabwe
- Occupations: Painter, Sculptor

Joseph Muzondo (born 1953) is a Zimbabwean painter and sculptor.

Taught informally in working stone by his uncle, Muzondo subsequently joined National Gallery B.A.T. Workshop in Harare, Zimbabwe. He has studied textile design in Tanzania and graphic arts in Austria, and has exhibited worldwide. His work is in the collections of the National Gallery of Zimbabwe.
