= Arthur Fata =

Zimbabwean sculptor

- Born: Arthur; 1963 (age 61–62); Harare
- Citizenship: Zimbabwe
- Occupation: Sculptor

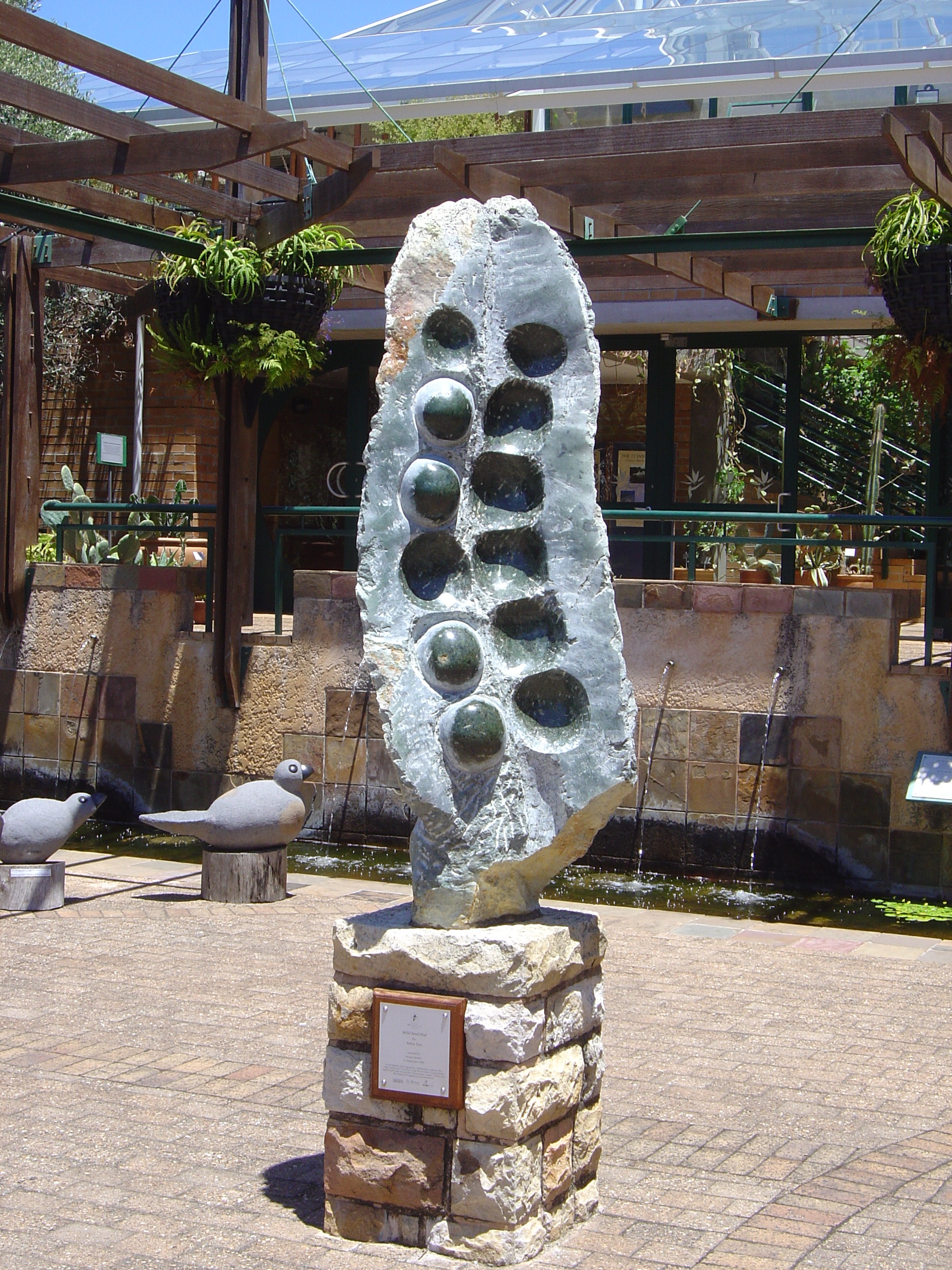
Wild Seed Pod by Arthur Fata at the entrance to Kirstenbosch National Botanical Garden in Cape Town, South Africa.

Arthur Fata (born 1963) is a Zimbabwean sculptor.

Born in Salisbury (now Harare), Fata studied fine art at the Workshop School of the National Gallery of Zimbabwe. Here he learned to use painting, printmaking, and textiles. Unusually for a Zimbabwean artist, he later spent time studying in England, Portugal, and Bulgaria. His work has drawn comparison to that of Dominic Benhura, with whom he shares an interest in mixed media work. The British Museum has an example of his sculpture in its permanent collection.
