= Bulelwa Madekurozwa =

- Born: 1972 (age 52–53); Zambia
- Education: Harare Polytechnic
- Known for: Sculpture
- Movement: Modernism

Bulelwa Madekurozwa (born 1972) is a Zambian-born Zimbabwean painter and printmaker.

== Career ==
Madekurozwa was born in 1972. She studied at Harare Polytechnic in Zimbabwe where she later joined the faculty. As a student, Madekurozwa was influenced by the disparity she noted between representations of men and women in painted portraits. This observation led her to engage with subjects that challenged traditional gender stereotypes. Madekurozwa has linked the frequency of docile women in Zimbabwean art to the interests of foreign buyers who often want and expect to buy stereotypical depictions of Africa, which local artists in turn feel pressured to produce. She explained in a 1998 interview with the Inter Press Service that: "If you don't sell, you don't live, you don't eat. A lot of the time you don't produce what you would like to. And that gives foreigners a lot of power over what Zimbabwean art is."

In 1997, Madekurozwa participated in a faculty exchange program with Virginia Commonwealth University. Two years later she held a residency at Gasworks Gallery in London where she created work that focused on the "relationship between men and women and between the private and the public."

== Work ==
Madekurozwa's work was described in The Queer Encyclopedia of the Visual Arts as "articulat[ing] the conflict between societal expectations, gender stereotyping, and personal needs." Of her own work, Madekurozwa has said, "I use my art to re-create the world on my own terms; taboos become exposed and the hidden is given prominence. In my work, women are more than just powerless beasts of burden and the male body becomes objectified for the delight of the voyeur."

Joyce M. Youmans points to Heaven (1997) as an example of how Madkurozwa's counters the commodification of the female body, by turning the lens on male figures of authority. The subject, a young policeman, partially dressed in his uniform, is depicted like a life-sized pin-up, which Youmans interprets as inviting viewers' eyes to "travel into the scene and caress the male body." Sunday Afternoon (1997) used a similar approach, featuring two male policemen, one only partially clothed, sharing an implied homosexual embrace, while facing the viewer. It was awarded the Mobil Overall Award of Distinction. Writing for Gallery, reviewer Chiedza Musengesi praised the painting's technique and themes, noting that it urges viewers to "re-examine our traditional notions about human feelings and individual needs." Of the same painting, Carol Magee notes that "broad brushstrokes helps to create emotional energy, dynamism and tension, as does her use of rich, dark colours."

== Personal life ==
In 1995, Madekurozwa publicly identified herself as a lesbian.

== Exhibitions ==
- Contemporary art in Zimbabwe. Amsterdam: Artoteek Amsterdam Zuidoost, 1998.

== Awards and nominations ==
- Painting Award at the 1st Biennial of Visual Arts by Women in Zimbabwe (1997)
- Mobil Overall Award of Distinction (1997)
