= Agnes Nyanhongo =

Zimbabwean stone sculptor (born 1960)

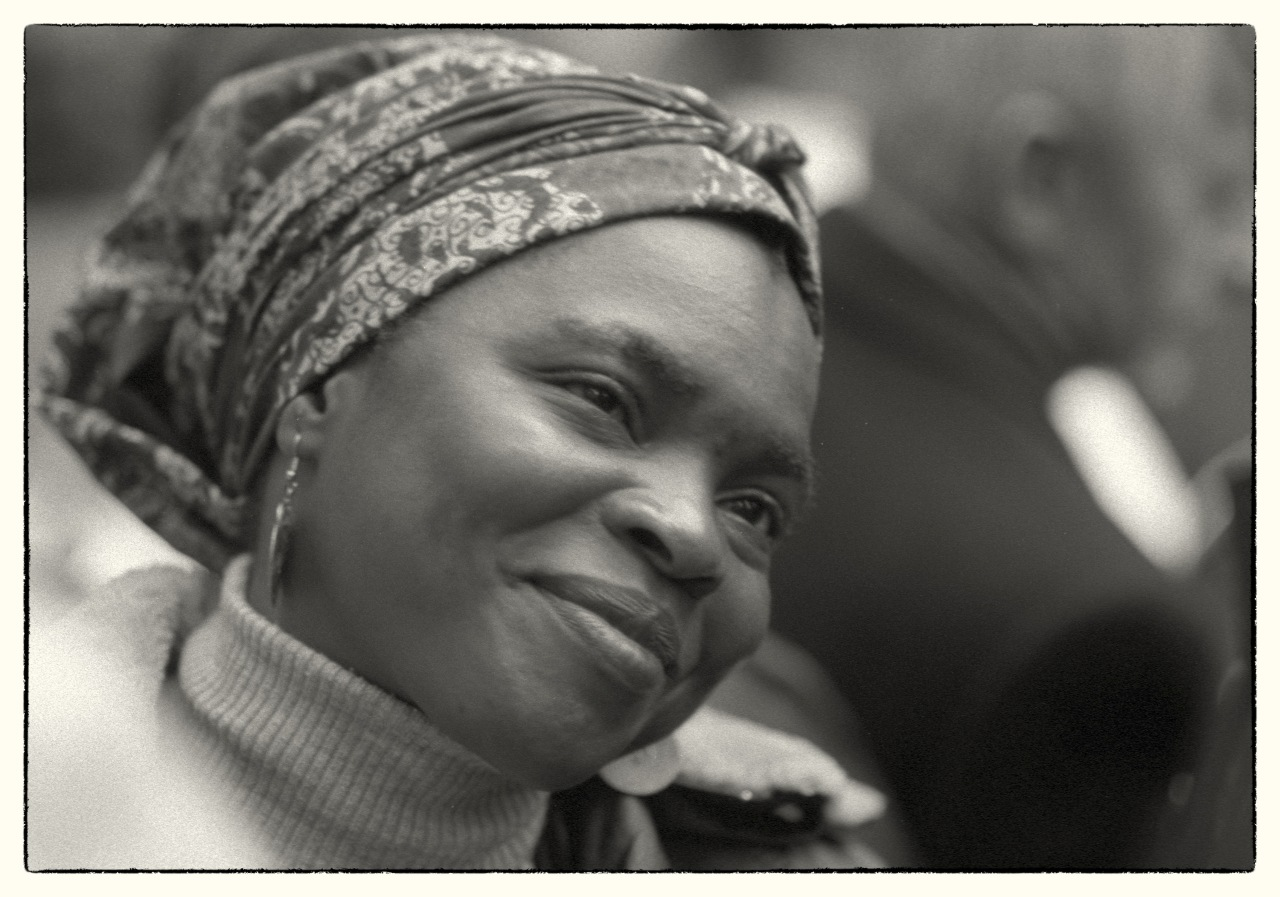
- Agnes Nyanhongo, Frankfurt, Germany, 1994
- Born: 1960 (age 65–66); Nyanga, Zimbabwe
- Education: BAT workshop school, National Gallery of Zimbabwe
- Known for: Sculpture
- Notable work: Refugee Mother and Child
- Movement: Sculpture of Zimbabwe
- Awards: Award of Merit, Zimbabwe Heritage Exhibition, 1989 and 1990

Agnes Nyanhongo (born 1960) is a Zimbabwean stone sculptor.

== Early life and training ==
A native of Nyanga, Nyanhongo is the daughter of first-generation sculptor Claud Nyanhongo and sister of Gedion Nyanhongo. She spent much time helping in her father's studio as a girl and began sculpting full-time in 1980. In 1983, she entered the B.A.T. Workshop school at the National Gallery of Zimbabwe in Harare, where she spent three years.

== Career ==
Stylistically, Nyanhongo's work is very similar to that of her father, and takes as its theme mainly female issues. Her sculptures are in the permanent collection of the Chapungu Sculpture Park in Harare, at the Museum of Outdoor Arts in Englewood, Colorado, and at the exhibition Zimbabwe Sculpture: a Tradition in Stone at Hartsfield-Jackson Atlanta International Airport.

The catalogue "Chapungu: Culture and Legend – A Culture in Stone" for the exhibition at Kew Gardens in 2000 depicts Nyanhongo's major works Divided Family (Springstone, 1992) on p. 32-33, Keeping the History (Springstone, 1999) on p. 108-109, Grandmother Fetches Water (Springstone, 1998) on p. 80-81 and her celebration of the Zimbabwean national heroine Mbuya Nehanda, Mbuya Nehanda - Spirit Medium (Opal stone, 1995) on p. 78-79. Nyanhongo was resident artist at Chapungu Sculpture Park, Harare (1996–2003) and her work is widely collected: Oprah Winfrey and Maya Angelou are among its known owners.

== Selected exhibitions ==
- 1985 Africa Central - London
- 1985 Zimbabwe Heritage Annual, Harare
- 1990 Contemporary Stone Carving from Zimbabwe, Yorkshire Sculpture Park, UK
- 1991 Mabwe Gallery, Harare
- 1992 Universal Exposition, Seville
- 1994 Palmengarten, Frankfurt
- 1995 Galleri Knud Grothe, Denmark
- 1996 Galerie Im Schlobgarten, Germany
- 1996 Chapungu Sculpture Park, Harare
- 1997 Fort Canning Park, Singapore
- 1998 Old State House, Hartford, CT
- 2000 Chapungu: Custom and Legend – A Culture in Stone, Kew Gardens, UK
- 2001 Missouri Botanical Gardens, MO
- 2003 Chicago Botanical Gardens, IL
- 2003 In Praise of Women (tour) Oxford, London, Copenhagen, Uppsala
- 2005 In Praise of Women III (tour) London, Toronto
- 2014 National Gallery of Zimbabwe, Harare

== See also ==
- Sculpture of Zimbabwe
