= Locardia Ndandarika =

Zimbabwean sculptor

- Born: 1945; Bindura
- Died: 5 January 2023 (aged 77–78)
- Citizenship: Zimbabwe
- Occupation: Sculptor
- Spouse: Joseph Ndandarika
- Children: 2

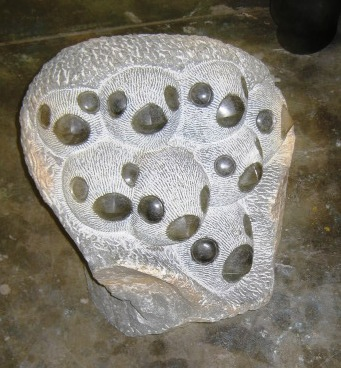
Proud of Africa (2005)

Locardia Ndandarika (1945 – 5 January 2023), was a Zimbabwean sculptor.

A native of Bindura, as a young girl Ndandarika made models in clay using traditional methods. In 1964. she married Joseph Ndandarika, divorcing him in 1978. During their marriage she learned more about sculpture, and later turned to it full-time. In 1986 she became a member of the Workshop Gallery; she was also invited to work at the Chapungu Sculpture Park. In 1990, she was invited to participate in the Commonwealth Games in New Zealand. Ndandarika has exhibited and held workshops in the United States, the Netherlands, South Africa, and New Zealand since 1997.

She is the mother of Ronnie Dongo and Virginia Ndandarika.
