= Joseph Ndandarika =

Zimbabwean sculptor

- Born: 1940; Harare, Zimbabwe
- Died: May 1991
- Education: Serima Mission; BAT workshop school, National Gallery of Zimbabwe
- Known for: Painting, sculpture
- Notable work: Bushmen Running From the Rain (1962)
- Movement: Sculpture of Zimbabwe
- Spouses: Locardia Ndandarika; Rachel Ndandarika
- Awards: Award of Merit, Zimbabwe Heritage Exhibition, 1986

Joseph Ndandarika (1940 – May 1991) was a Zimbabwean sculptor known for his figurative works.

== Early life and education ==
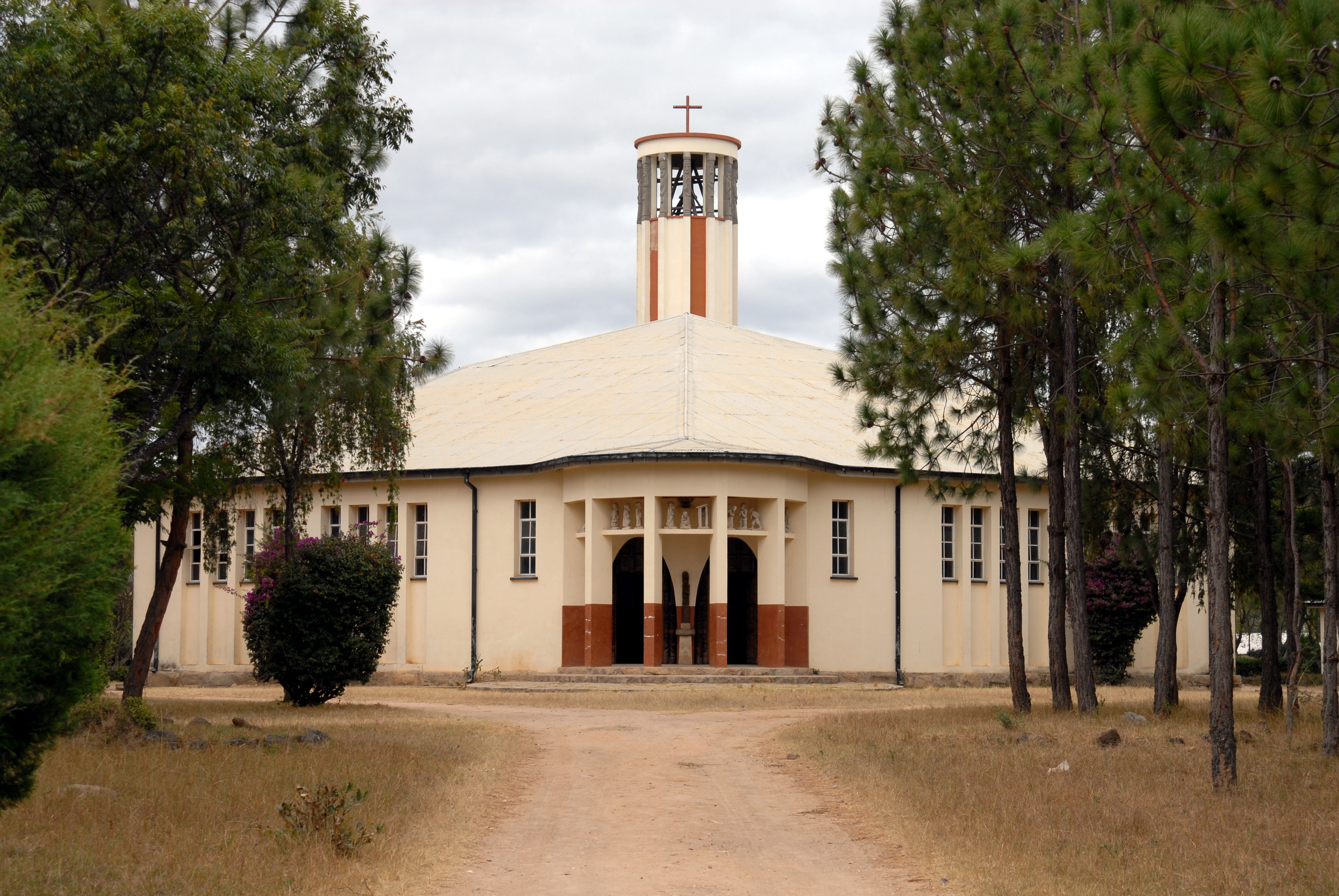
St Mary's Church, Serima Mission

Ndandarika was born in Salisbury, Rhodesia and grew up in Rusape. He was the son of a Malawian bus driver and a Shona mother. His mother was artistic and occasionally worked as a model for the sculptor Job Kekana, another Rusape resident. After completing primary school, he attended a Catholic boarding school at Serima Mission in the late 1950s. His artistic talent was identified there by Fr John Groeber and Cornelius Manguma, who trained him in drawing and woodcarving. While at Serima he was chosen by Groeber to paint several murals inside St. Mary's church.

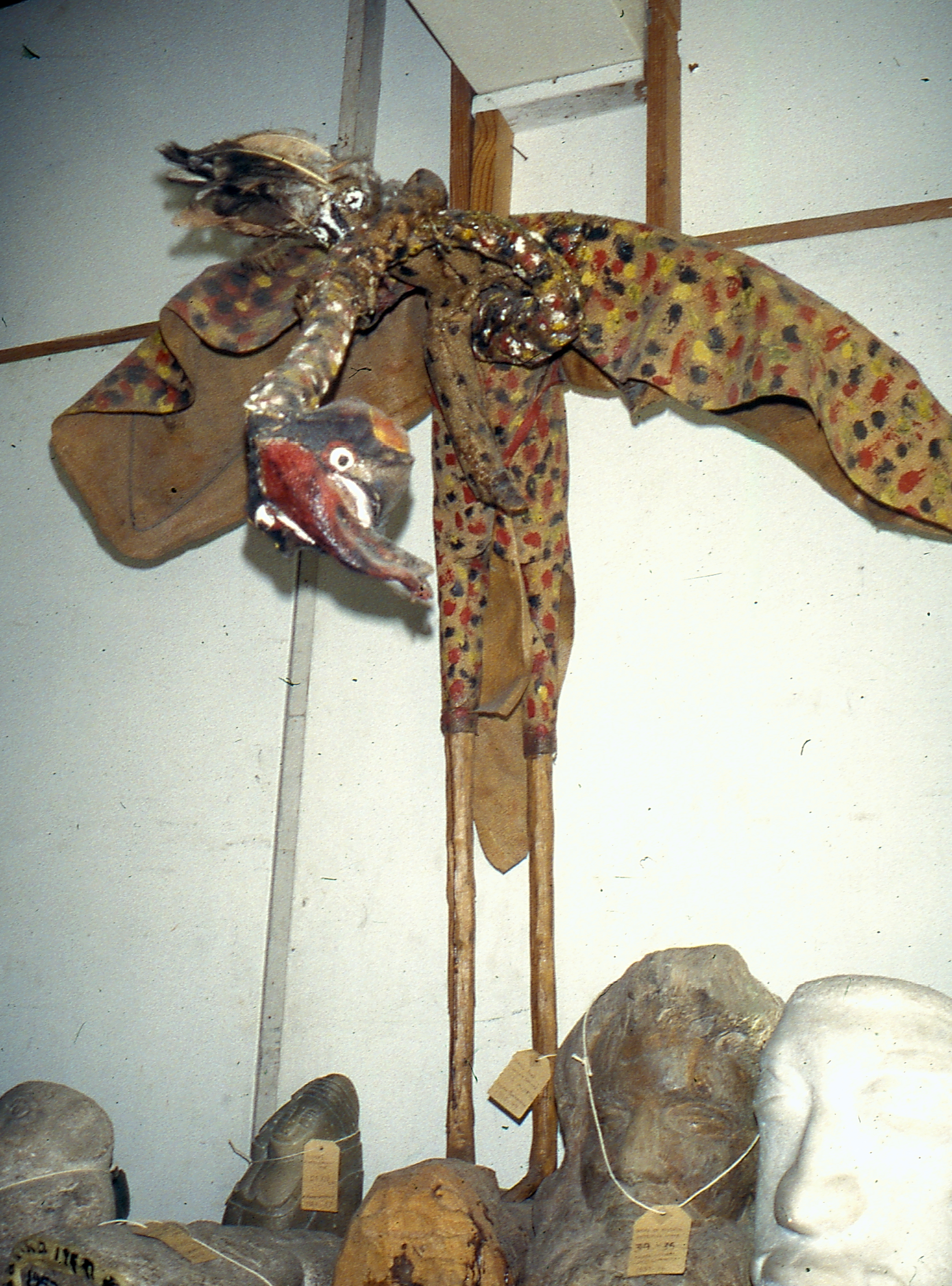
Magic Bird. 1962. mixed media

After leaving Serima in 1959, he moved to Salisbury and joined Frank McEwen's Workshop School in Harare in 1960. Initially he became one of McEwen's leading painters, specializing in landscapes and witchcraft scenes. Due to McEwen's preference for untrained, pagan artists, Ndandarika hid his training at Serima for many years. He also developed a new persona as having been the grandson of a sangoma, alleging that he had undergone extensive training with him. The height of Ndandarika's painting career came when MoMA acquired his 1962 oil, "Bushmen Running From the Rain." Ndandarika's signature was his mixing of the paints on the canvas rather than the palette, a technique that created a highly uneven surface.

== Later life and exhibitions ==
After several years of painting, Ndandarika was sent by McEwen to train in stone sculpture with Joram Mariga. During the mid-1960s he gradually shifted more and more towards sculpting, and would end up in all of McEwen's major exhibitions that made Zimbabwean stone sculpture famous. Ndandarika's biggest impact may have been convincing McEwen that in Shona mythology, spirits inhabited rock formations. This formulation had a major impact in McEwen's marketing of his sculpture, leading him to claim that his sculptors were unleashing the spirit in the stone in the course of their work. Ndandarika was able to keep selling through the hard times of the 1970s following McEwen's departure from Rhodesia, and during the 1980s Zimbabwean arts revival he was one of the country's most prominent "first generation" sculptors.

One of Ndandarika’s sculptural works, called Telling Secrets, was depicted on a Zimbabwean stamp issued to commemorate Commonwealth Day on 14 March 1983. It formed the 11c value in a set completed with works by Henry Munyaradzi, John Takawira and Nicholas Mukomberanwa.

=== Selected solo or group exhibitions ===
- 1963 New Art from Rhodesia, Commonwealth Institute, London
- 1964 International Art exhibition, Lusaka, Zambia
- 1968 New African Art; organised by MoMA, New York, USA
- 1971 Sculpture Contemporaine des Shonas d’Afrique, Musée Rodin, Paris, France
- 1981 Retrospective Exhibition of Shona Sculpture, Zimbabwe House, London
- 1985 Contemporary Stone Sculpture from Zimbabwe, Irving Sculpture Gallery, Sydney, Australia
- 1987 International Contemporary Art fair, Los Angeles, USA
- 1988 Chicago International Art Exposition, Chicago, USA
- 1988 Australia Art Expo, Darling Harbour, Sydney
- 1990 Contemporary Stone Carving from Zimbabwe, Yorkshire Sculpture Park, UK
- 1990 Stone Sculpture from Zimbabwe, Millesgården Museum, Stockholm, Sweden
- 2000 Chapungu: Custom and Legend – A Culture in Stone, Kew Gardens, UK

== Personal life ==
Ndandarika was married for a time to the sculptor Locardia Ndandarika, and his children Ronnie Drigo and Virginia Ndandarika are also artists. He also served as a teacher and mentor to a number of artists, including Jonathan Mhondorohuma.
