= Frank McEwen =

English art historian

Francis Jack McEwen, OBE (19 April 1907 – 15 January 1994) was an English artist, teacher, and museum administrator. He is best remembered today for his efforts to bring attention to the work of Shona artists in Rhodesia and for helping to found the National Gallery of Zimbabwe. He was awarded the OBE in 1963.

== Early life ==
Born in Mexico and brought up in Devon, McEwen grew up surrounded by art from West Africa, which his father had collected on various business trips. Having attended Mill Hill School, in 1926, he went to Paris to study art history at the Sorbonne and the Institut d'Art et d'Archaeologie; his teacher was Henri Focillon. Through Focillon, McEwen met and befriended artists such as Constantin Brâncuși, Georges Braque, Henri Matisse, Pablo Picasso, and Fernand Léger, and gained a deal of respect for the teachings of Gustave Moreau, which were to influence much of his later career.

Upon Focillon's advice, McEwen chose to become a painter rather than a lecturer, which led to a breach with his family, as a result of which he had to support himself financially through painting and picture restoration. He wandered around Europe for years, taking menial jobs at power stations to fund his travels. From 1928 until 1929, he spent time in Flanders, painting wildflowers and other subjects in his spare time. He exhibited in London at the Goupil Salon and the New English Art Club.

McEwen eventually returned to Paris, where, with Foucillon's assistance, he found a job as an apprentice to an art restorer who worked on collections at the Louvre; soon, he had his own studio and business in the city. In 1939, he moved to Toulon, starting an art workshop for the untrained and basing its rules on Moreau's theories. When France fell in 1940, he took a fishing boat to Algiers hoping that war would not reach the French colonies.

== World War II ==
McEwen quickly grew disillusioned with the war but, through contacts with the French Resistance and France's government in exile, was able, as a fluent French speaker, to find work at the headquarters of the Allied Forces. He began work there after November 1942, serving as a civil assistant to General Innes Irons. In January 1945, he transferred to the newly created British Council.

When McEwen joined its ranks, the British Council attempted to design an exhibition of British art to export to France. The assignment was difficult, as the French art world was viewed as somewhat chauvinistic and likely to sneer at most British artistic efforts. McEwen designed a show around some of Herbert Read's child art collection, mainly gathered from teaching experiments similar to McEwen's own, done by Marion Richardson and based on Moreau's ideas; such experiments were far ahead of French teaching practices of the era. Sixty artworks, many similar in style to post-Impressionist French works, were selected, and the exhibit was successful.

It was followed by a one-man show for Henry Moore at the end of 1945 and by exhibits of works by Joseph Mallord, William Turner, William Blake, and Graham Sutherland, among others. Concurrently, McEwen designed shows of French art in London, and exhibitions of Picasso, Matisse, Braque, Georges Rouault, Léger, and Raoul Dufy followed from 1945 to 1947. The Picasso show at the Victoria and Albert Museum incited hundreds of letters of protest to The Times of London, which brought the painter great merriment when McEwen translated them for him.

== Move to Africa ==
By 1952, McEwen began to feel that the School of Paris was becoming trivial and showed greater interest in African culture. When the idea of founding the Rhodes National Gallery in Salisbury, Rhodesia, was floated, McEwen was consulted and showed great interest in the project. He went to Rhodesia for a month in 1954 for further consultation but found himself unimpressed with what he saw; there was no local artistic scene to speak of, and the avowed intent of the museum's board of directors was to stock its halls with Old Master paintings. African art was not to have a place in the collection.

McEwen felt that a gallery could only thrive if some artistic exchange were designed and that there would have to be some sort of local product to make such an exchange worthwhile. When a director for the museum was sought, he applied, with the encouragement of both Picasso and Herbert Read; to his surprise, he was chosen. Upon receiving it, he asked for a year's grace, resigned from the Council and sailed from Paris to Mozambique - via Brazil - and around the Cape of Good Hope.

== Foundation of the Gallery ==
McEwen arrived in Rhodesia before construction of the Gallery was completed and set about looking for staff to hire. Among the people he met was Thomas Mukarobgwa, a former policeman who talked to him a great deal about the culture of the Shona people. Regulations stated that all Gallery staff must be ex-policemen, so Mukarobgwa was hired as a cleaner. McEwan gave him materials for drawing and painting, and provided the same materials to other staff members. An unofficial workshop of sorts, to be called the Workshop School, was formed in the basement of the museum; within a year of its foundation, painting and drawing had been superseded by carving. Local stones, such as soapstone, serpentinite, and verdite, were the media of choice. Among the artists whose careers began at the museum were Sam Songo, Mukarobgwa, Boira Mteki, Joseph Ndandarika, John and Bernard Takawira, and Joram Mariga; along with Josia Manzi, Nicholas Mukomberanwa and others, they went on to create one of the first native schools of contemporary art in Africa. Further details are to be found in the article on the Sculpture of Zimbabwe.

The workshop remained an unofficial part of the museum until its wares began to sell abroad via the efforts of Lord Delaware, David Stirling, and others; eventually the board of directors officially accepted responsibility for its activities. Its products were exhibited at the Museum of Modern Art in 1968, the Musée Rodin in 1971, and London's ICA in 1972. Political tensions in Rhodesia grew unbearable, however, and McEwen resigned his post in 1973 to live on his boat in the Bahamas. He took frequent trips to Brazil, but eventually returned to Devon, settling in Ilfracombe.

McEwen left an important bequest to the British Museum, in the form of a collection of specimens in stone, clay and wood (mainly items he had purchased from the artists working in 1957-1973). This group of works is of significant value to Art Historians as it shows the range of sculptural forms being produced at that time and McEwen's own tastes in art.

== Marriage ==
In 1933, Frank McEwen had a child (Frank Aldridge) with American Painter Frances Wood. They lived together in France from 1931 to 1937. In 1969, McEwen married Mary McFadden; they divorced in 1970.

== Last years and death ==
With the worldwide interest in Shona carving, McEwen became a popular figure in artistic circles, being called upon for comment and to be filmed for various projects. He was content to live, yet still expressed concern that the quality of Shona art might become compromised with a broadening of its popularity.

McEwen died at his home in Devon in 1994.

== See also ==
- Sculpture of Zimbabwe
