= Moses Masaya =

- Born: Moses; 1947
- Died: 1995 (aged 47–48)
- Citizenship: Zimbabwe
- Occupation: Sculptor
- Relatives: Eddie

Moses Masaya (1947–1995) was a Zimbabwean sculptor.

Masaya became a student of Joram Mariga in 1957 and worked with him for two years. In 1970 he joined an outdoor studio run by Frank McEwen in Nyanga, remaining there until 1974. Much of his work is inspired by his Shona heritage. Masaya has taught numerous artists, including his cousin Eddie.

Masaya has exhibited widely internationally.

Lucky Office, an aspiring young sculptor met Masaya at the age of 19, and has since also grown into one of Zimbabwe's leading sculptors.
