= Mabvuku =

Suburb east of Harare, Zimbabwe

- High Density Suburb
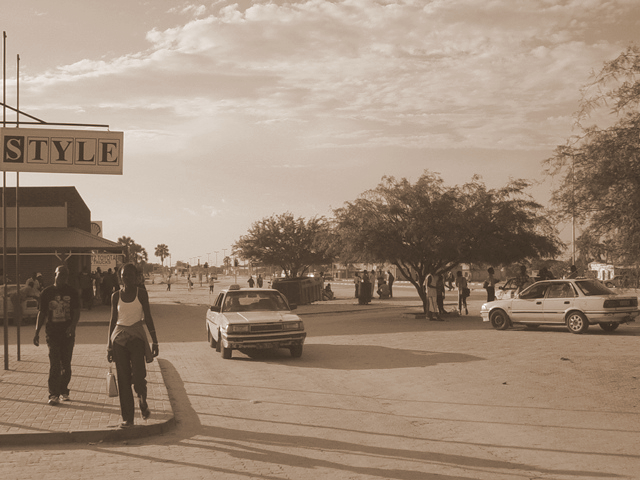
- " Scene at Kamunhu, one of the main shopping centres during the 20th century. In the 21st century a lot has changed".- Kudakwashe L Kaseke and Snr Rodney Mubvakure
- Nickname: Bvukaz/Bvakaz
- Location within Zimbabwe
- Coordinates: 17°53′24″S 31°8′51″E
- Town: Mabvuku
- Established: 1900
- Elevation: 1,473 m (4,833 ft)

Population (2018)
  - Total: over 30,000(estimated )
- Time zone: +2:00

Mabvuku is a suburb east of Harare, the capital city of Zimbabwe.

== History ==
Old Mabvuku traces its origins back to the 1950s, with its oldest school, Donnybrook Primary School, established in 1954. New Mabvuku, on the other hand, was developed beginning in 1972 by the Salisbury City Council. Before Zimbabwe’s colonization, Mabvuku was home to the VaShawasha people of the Soko Mbire clan, who settled in the area approximately 300 years ago. This area remains their native homeland, and their heritage is preserved in the names of streets and roads in Old Mabvuku, such as Tingini, Godzonga, Marembo, Chauruka, Nyamare, Nyahuni, Chaitezvi, Nzwere, and Shambare. These names, along with the praise poetry of the Shona people compiled by Chatima, provide evidence of their historical presence.

Mabvuku and its neighbouring suburb, Tafara, have a significant population of people of Malawian, Mozambican, and Zambian origin, many of whom migrated to the area seeking employment prior to Zimbabwe’s independence. They predominantly worked as domestic workers in nearby suburbs like Highlands, Greendale, and Msasa or in the industrial area of Msasa and the nearby Portland cement factory (now Khaya formerly Lafarge). As the population grew over the years, some residents began working in industrial areas farther afield, such as Willowvale and Workington in western Harare. During the 1970s and 1980s, it was common to see cultural displays such as Nyau (Chigure) dances or Muganda celebrations, reflecting the influence of the foreign-origin communities. Additionally, burial societies, initially rooted in ethnic traditions, have since gained widespread acceptance among the broader Zimbabwean population.

== Economy ==
The local economy is primarily informal, with residents engaging in small-scale trading, artisanal activities, and various micro-enterprises to sustain their livelihoods.

In recent years, Mabvuku-Tafara has faced significant infrastructural challenges that have impacted economic activities. Notably, the area has suffered from inadequate water supply and power cuts. To address this, initiatives such as the drilling of 26 boreholes by local Member of Parliament Pedzisayi "Scott" Sakupwanya in March 2024 have been implemented to provide residents with access to clean water.

Additionally, the suburb's road infrastructure has deteriorated over time, affecting transportation and local commerce. In April 2023, Sakupwanya invested US$2.5 million in a road rehabilitation project aimed at improving the area's road network, thereby facilitating better movement for both residents and businesses.. The road rehabilitation initiative has resulted in several major roads being rehabilitated including Donnybrook Road, which stretches from Acturus Road to Mutare Road, Tafara Way, which cuts across the suburbs of Mabvuku and Tafara, and Manresa Way. The latter 2 roads are yet to be marked, however.

In addition, the suburb is home to Khayah Cement Limited's plant, which resumed normal cement production in November 2023 after restoring its mill. However, by December 2024, the company filed for corporate rescue due to operational difficulties, including economic sanctions and increased competition from imported cement. Additionally, PPC Ltd. operates a cement manufacturing plant in Msasa, Harare, contributing to the local cement supply.

The retail sector in Mabvuku includes major supermarkets such as Bhola Mega Mart, providing residents with essential goods and services. Pharmacies and service stations are also present, catering to the healthcare and fuel needs of the community. Construction of a 15000 seater stadium for the local Zimbabwe Premier Soccer League team, Scottland FC, has also provided tangible employment opportunities for the locals.

== Challenges ==
Mabvuku-Tafara has been seriously affected by the prevailing economic challenges, which has compromised the Harare City Council's ability to provide services. The residents, like other Zimbabweans, have suffered through water and power cuts with many residents resorting to alternative sources. In 2005, Operation Murambatsvina destroyed slums in Mabvuku and other areas of Harare such as Budiriro and Mbare as well as nearby Chitungwiza. By the mid-2010s, the number of people squatting in informal settlements was growing again. A new settlement outside Mabvuku was called Bob which later formalised and became Eastview now under the auspices of the nearby Goromonzi Rural District Council.

In 2021, the Clean City program brought clean affordable drinking water to Mabvuku. Many residents had gone without running water for 30 years. By 2023, residents were voicing concerns over an inconsistent water supply, as citywide water rationing further exacerbated their struggles.

== Climate ==
Climate data for Mabvuku
Month	Jan	Feb	Mar	Apr	May	Jun	Jul	Aug	Sep	Oct	Nov	Dec	Year
Mean daily maximum °C (°F)	26 (78)	25 (77)	25 (77)	25 (77)	23 (73)	21 (69)	21 (69)	23 (73)	26 (78)	28 (82)	28 (82)	26 (78)	24 (75)
Mean daily minimum °C (°F)	15 (59)	15 (59)	14 (57)	12 (53)	8 (46)	6 (42)	5 (41)	7 (44)	10 (50)	13 (55)	15 (59)	15 (59)	11 (51)
Average precipitation mm (inches)	210 (8.4)	160 (6.3)	91 (3.6)	38 (1.5)	7.6 (0.3)	2.5 (0.1)	2.5 (0.1)	2.5 (0.1)	7.6 (0.3)	36 (1.4)	99 (3.9)	180 (7)	840 (32.9)
Source: Weatherbase

== Notable people from the suburb ==
- Wilfred Mugeyi
- William Mugeyi
- Marshall Munetsi

== See also ==
- Epworth
