= Chapungu Sculpture Park =

Sculpture garden in Msasa, Harare, Zimbabwe

The Chapungu Sculpture Park is a sculpture garden in Msasa, Harare, Zimbabwe, which displays the work of Zimbabwean stone sculptors. Spanning over 15 acres of landscaped gardens, the park is dedicated to showcasing the heritage of African stone sculpture.

== History ==
Chapungu Sculpture Park was established in 1970 by Roy Guthrie as the Gallery Shona Sculpture. Guthrie played a pivotal role in promoting the work of Zimbabwean sculptors internationally. His efforts led to numerous exhibitions, including a touring show titled Chapungu: Custom and Legend — A Culture in Stone, which featured sculptures in botanical gardens around the world.

The places visited include:

- (1999) Kirstenbosch National Botanical Garden, Cape Town, South Africa
- (2000) Royal Botanical Gardens, Kew, London, United Kingdom,
- (2001) Missouri Botanical Garden, St Louis, USA
- (2001) Boyce Thompson Arboretum State Park, Superior, USA
- (2002) Red Butte Garden and Arboretum, Salt Lake City, USA
- (2003) Garfield Park Conservatory, Chicago, USA
- (2003) Chicago Botanic Garden, Chicago USA
- (2004) Denver Botanic Gardens, Denver, USA

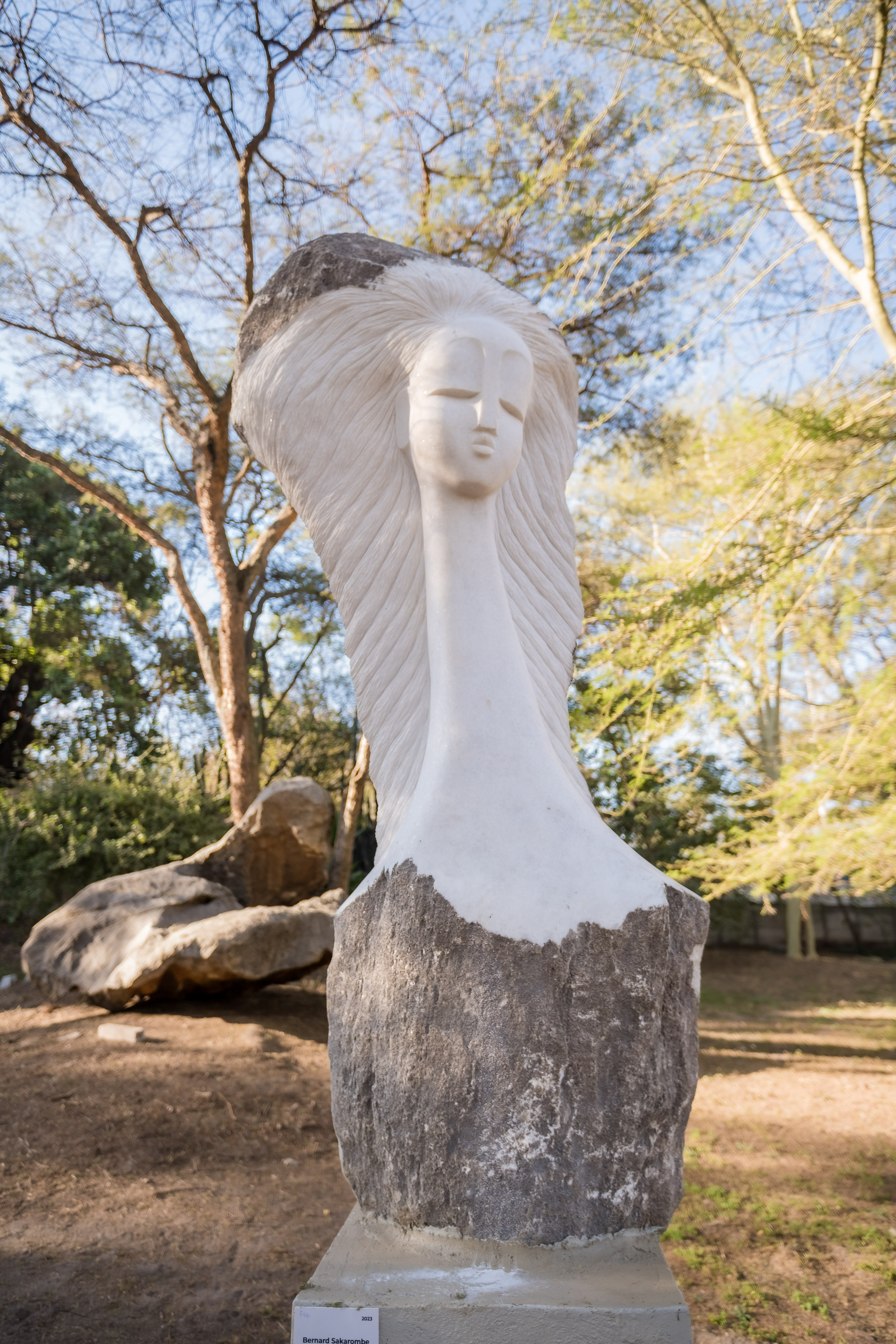
Never Been Kissed by Bernard Sakarombe made in 2023 out of Dolomite sits at the entrance of the 'Cathedral' at Chapungu Sculpture Park in Harare.

== Artists ==
Among the artists whose works can be seen at the park are:

- Dominic Benhura
- Crispen Chakanyuka
- Square Chikwanda
- Sanwell Chirume
- Stanford Derere
- Arthur Fata
- Barankinya Gotsa
- Tapfuma Gutsa
- Makina Kameya
- Biggie Kapeta
- Colleen Madamombe
- Joram Mariga
- Eddie Masaya
- Moses Masaya
- Bernard Matemera
- Boira Mteki
- Sylvester Mubayi
- Thomas Mukarobgwa
- Nicholas Mukomberanwa
- Henry Munyaradzi
- Joseph Muzondo
- Joseph Ndandarika
- Locardia Ndandarika
- Agnes Nyanhongo
- Gedion Nyanhongo
- Amos Supuni
- Bernard Takawira
- John Takawira

== Chapungu Sculpture Center ==
The park also houses the Chapungu Sculpture Centre, which hosts an important residency program and plays a crucial role in shaping the careers of young sculptors. The center offers a residency program that gives emerging artists the opportunity to work alongside established sculptors and learn from their expertise. Additionally, the HAYA Cooperative—a collective of artists based at Chapungu—actively contributes to the park's artistic community.

== Expansion ==
In 2007, Chapungu Sculpture Park expanded to Loveland, Colorado, with the establishment of another park and gallery.

== See also ==
- Sculpture of Zimbabwe
