= Springstone (material) =

Hard, dark stone used in Shona sculpture

Springstone is an exceptionally hard, dark serpentinite stone used in Shona sculpture.

Springstone is found in the Tengenenge region of Zimbabwe. The statue of Robert Mugabe at the State House in Harare was carved out of springstone using chisels and sandpaper.
