= National Gallery of Zimbabwe =

Coordinates: 17°49′31″S 31°02′56″E

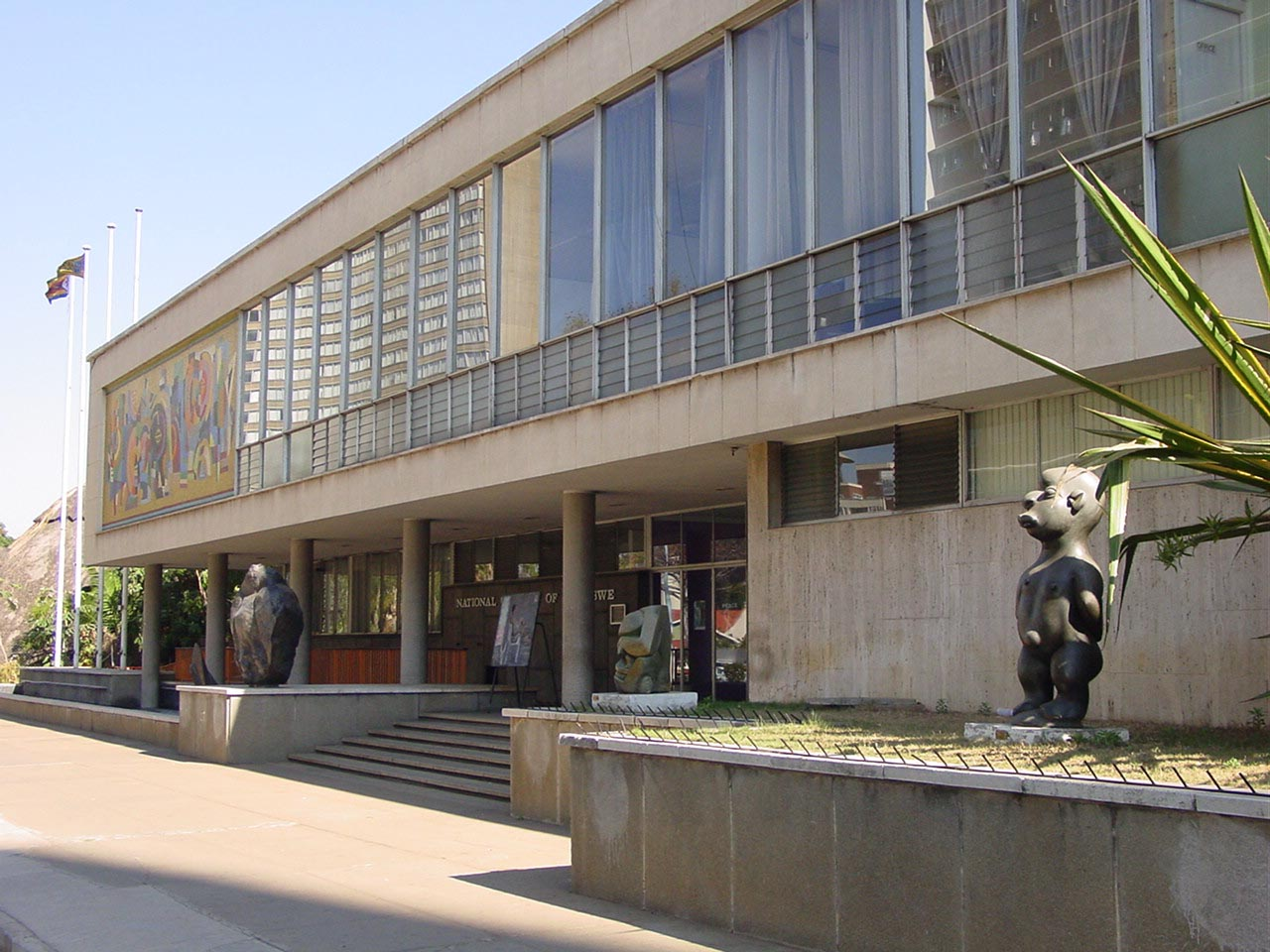
- Former name: National Gallery of Rhodesia (Rhodes National Gallery)
- Established: 16 July 1957
- Location: Main Gallery: 20 Julius Nyerere Way, Harare. Regional Galleries: Mutare and Bulawayo, Zimbabwe
- Type: Art Gallery
- Collection size: Close to 6000 works
- Visitors: Approximately 1030 visitors a month
- Director: Raphael Chikukwa
- Curator: Fadzai Muchemwa
- Website: nationalgallery.co.zw

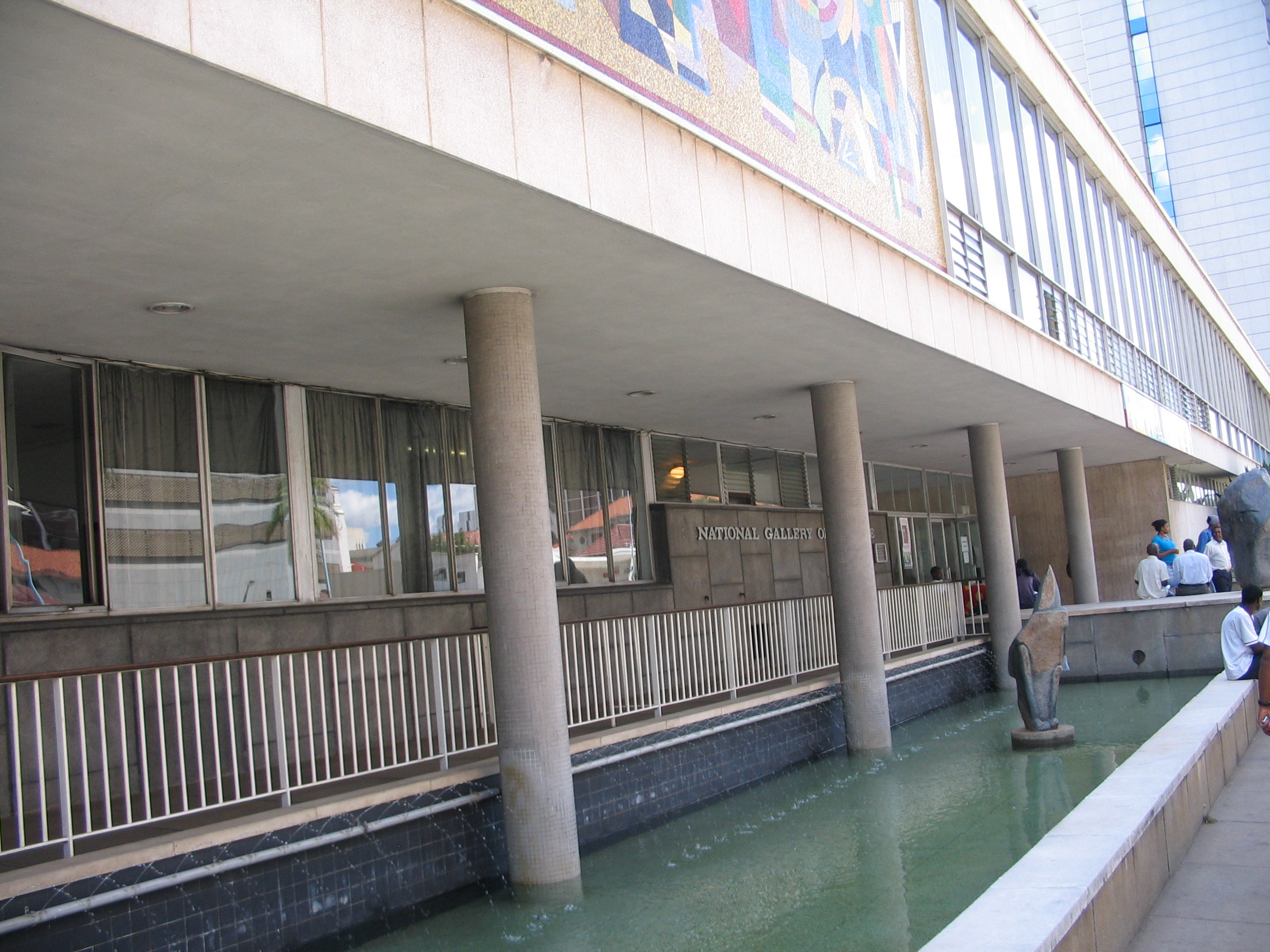
Entrance to the National Gallery of Zimbabwe

The National Gallery of Zimbabwe (NGZ) is a gallery in Harare, Zimbabwe, dedicated to the presentation and conservation of Zimbabwe's contemporary art and visual heritage. The original National Gallery of Rhodesia was designed and directed by Frank McEwen, a British citizen credited with bringing Shona Sculpture to the spotlight. The Gallery was officially opened by Queen Elizabeth The Queen Mother on July 16, 1957, and Queen Elizabeth II attended the sixth Zimbabwe Heritage Exhibition there in October 1991.

The current executive director is Raphael Chikukwa.

The different types of mediums of artwork that been showcased in the gallery are stone, metal, wooden sculptures, also paintings, drawings, installations that has been created by Zimbabwean artists.

== Regional galleries ==
=== National Gallery of Zimbabwe in Bulawayo ===
The National Gallery in Bulawayo is a branch of the NGZ opened in 1970 in Zimbabwe's second city, Bulawayo. It was located for some years in an old market building behind City Hall, but since 1993 has occupied Douslin House on Main Street, an elegant two-storey building of 1901. The current Regional Manager is Mrs. Silenkosi Moyo, and former Managers (Directors) of the National Gallery in Bulawayo have included Stephen Williams, Yvonne Vera, Addelis Sibutha, Voti Thebe and Butholezwe Kgosi Nyathi.

=== National Gallery of Zimbabwe in Mutare ===
The National Gallery of Zimbabwe in Mutare was opened in 1999 at Kopje House, which was built in 1897 and was the first hospital in Mutare. It was declared a Monument in the late 1970s and thereafter became a Culture House under the custody of the National Museums and Monuments. The National Gallery of Zimbabwe in Mutare has five members of staff under the leadership of the Regional Director, Elizabeth Muusha. The gallery runs an annual exhibitions programme showing a selection of work from the Harare gallery, while offering local artists the opportunity to show their work.

== History ==
The National Gallery of Zimbabwe has been in existence since 1957, witnessed the shift from colonialism to independence, and has been central to the rise of Zimbabwean artists in the world art market. The Gallery was initially planned in the 1930s, but the outbreak of the Second World War impeded the colonial government's involvement in its progress. However, the idea was given new life when in 1943, Sir James McDonald, a friend and colleague of Cecil John Rhodes, left a bequest of £30,000 "in trust for the people of the colony" to establish an art gallery and art museum in Salisbury, Southern Rhodesia. At the end of 1953, the Inaugural Board of the Gallery was established, chaired by the Governor of Southern Rhodesia. The passing of the National Gallery Act by the Southern Rhodesian Legislative Assembly in early 1952 saw the dissolution of the Inaugural Board and the establishment of the Board of Trustees. Major (later Sir) Stephen Courtauld presided as Chairman of the Board until 1962. He was an enthusiastic supporter of the Gallery from its inception, and after his departure from the Board he and his wife became the first patrons of the Gallery.

The Gallery was conceived as a national institution, representing Southern Rhodesia, Northern Rhodesia, and Nyasaland, governed from 1953 to 1963 as a united Federation. Salisbury City Council agreed to take full responsibility for overseeing the building, establishment and administration of the Gallery, and the Mayor of Salisbury was made a fixed appointee to the Board of Trustees. The first responsibilities of the Board were to establish funds for the building, to select the building design, and to appoint a Director. They next established funds for the running and administration costs of the Gallery, and made provision for an endowment fund for the acquisition of a permanent collection. At that time, the building funds consisted only of the McDonald bequest and a further £150,000 had yet to be raised. It was decided that an appeal should be launched among local businesses in support of building a gallery in Southern Rhodesia. "In all great countries of the world art galleries have their place in the cultural life of the community, and it is the firm belief of the Trustees that a National Art Gallery is essential to the progress of the people of this land," stated Sir Stephen Courtauld in the annual report of 1954, giving voice to the Board's support of the establishment of the Gallery.

== The Library at the National Gallery of Zimbabwe ==
The library of National Gallery of Zimbabwe was originated in 1950's. Starting in 1980's, the library had books about Zimbabwe's culture, architecture and modern art. The artwork in the gallery and the library teaches people about art.

== Exhibitions ==
=== Planetary Community Chicken Exhibition ===
The Planetary Community Chicken Exhibition was an experimental art and science project. Hosted in 2016, the exhibition was developed by Koen Vanmechelen and his exhibition group from Belgium, mushroom and poultry farming entrepreneur Chido Govera, and the curator Raphael Chikukra. The purpose of the exhibition was to encourage the people in Zimbabwe to produce and nurture their own foods and sustain a healthy lifestyle.

The exhibition includes four chicken hutches, mushrooms placed on shelves to support the moisture of the area, and nests. This exhibition required crucial care, including cleaning the environment, feeding the chickens, controlling the temperature and humidity, and protecting the mushroom spores.
