= Sindika Dokolo Foundation =

Art collection in Africa

The Sindika Dokolo Foundation is a cultural foundation headquartered in Luanda, Angola. It is supported by businessman Sindika Dokolo, the organization's president, and managed by its vice president, Fernando Alvim. Simon Njami the organization's consultant.

The foundation is engaged in the preservation, promotion and development of Sindika Dokolo's art collection and the Triennial of Luanda. It was the sponsor of the exhibition Check List Luanda Pop, a side project of Venice Biennale in 2007.

== Collection ==
The collection stems from the purchase of the Hans Bogatzke's collection. Fernando Alvim is responsible for the collection and the purchase of new art works, mainly those of young artists, and videos and installations.

The art collection is made of art works with a special focus on African artists and the African diaspora, one of the few art collections based in Africa. It is defined as a contemporary African art collection by its curator, Fernando Alvim. The collection emphasizes the African identity over the nationalities of the specific artists. The works of the collection are on display at the Triennial of Luanda as well as international shows such as SD Observatorio, Africa Screams, Beyond Desire, Chéri Samba, Horizons, Voices and Looking Both Ways.

It includes works from the following artists:

- Fanizani Akuda
- Ghada Amer
- El Anatsui
- Tyrone Appollis
- Miquel Barceló
- Bili Bidjocka
- Tiago Borges
- Willem Boshoff
- Zoulikha Bouabdellah
- Jimoh Buraimoh
- Dj Spooky
- Jean Dubuffet
- Abrie Fourie
- Kendell Geers
- Tapfuma Gutsa
- Romuald Hazoumé
- Alfredo Jaar
- Seidou Keita
- Amal Kenawy
- William Kentridge
- Abdoulaye Konaté
- Goddy Leye
- George Lilanga
- George Ebrin Adingra
- Michèle Magema
- Valente Malangatana
- Joram Mariga
- Santu Mofokeng
- Moké
- Zwelethu Mthethwa
- John Muafangejo
- Henry Munyaradzi
- Ingrid Mwangi
- Chris Ofili
- Olu Oguibe
- Pili Pili
- Tracey Rose
- Ruth Sacks
- Chéri Samba
- Berni Searle
- Yinka Shonibare
- John Takawira
- Pascale Marthine Tayou
- Cyprien Tokoudagba
- Minnette Vári
- Andy Warhol
- Sue Williamson
- Yonamine
- Gavin Young

== Bibliography ==
- Sindika Dokolo, African Collection of contemporary art, 2007.
- Simon Njami, Le saisissement d'être vu, 2007.

== See also ==
- Contemporary African art
- Luanda
- Sindika Dokolo
