= Bernard Matemera =

Zimbabwean sculptor

- Born: Bernard Matemera; 14 January 1946; Guruve, Zimbabwe
- Died: 4 March 2002 (aged 56)
- Education: Informal
- Known for: Sculpture
- Movement: Shona sculpture
- Awards: Award of Honour (Lalit Kala Akademi) VI Triennale, New Delhi, India, 1986

Bernard Matemera (14 January 1946 – 4 March 2002) was a Zimbabwean sculptor. The sculptural movement of which he was part is usually referred to as "Shona sculpture" (see Shona art), although some of its recognised members are not ethnically Shona. His whole professional career was spent at the Tengenenge Sculpture Community, 150 km north of Harare near Guruve.

Bernard Matemera died in March 2002.

== Early life and work ==
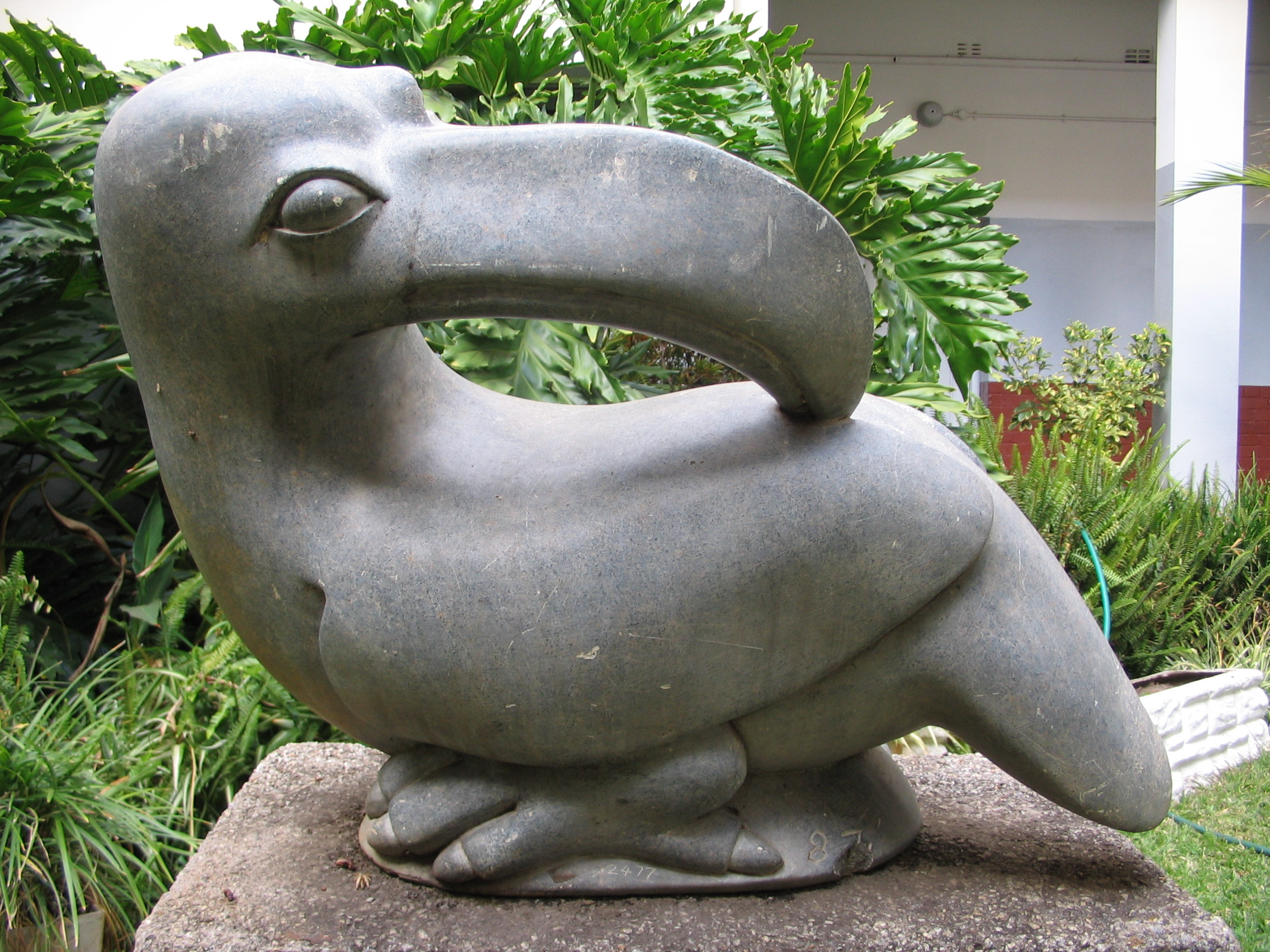
1973 carving of an eagle

Matemera was the son of a village headman, living near the town of Guruve, Mashonaland in the far north of what was, in 1946, Southern Rhodesia. He spoke Zezuru, one of the Shona dialects, and had four years of formal primary schooling: like other boys, he herded cattle, made clay pots and carved wood. In 1963 Matemera was working as a contract tractor driver for tobacco farmers in Tengenenge and met Tom Blomefield, whose farm had extensive deposits of serpentine stone suitable for carving. By 1966, Blomefield wanted to diversify the use of his land and welcomed new sculptors onto it to form a community of working artists. This was in part because at that time there were international sanctions against Rhodesia's white government led by Ian Smith, who had declared Unilateral Declaration of Independence in 1965, and tobacco was no longer able to generate sufficient income. Matemara was one of the first artists to take up sculpting full-time, joining others including Henry Munyaradzi, Josia Manzi, Fanizani Akuda, Sylvester Mubayi and Leman Moses, who formed part of what is now called the "First Generation" of Zimbabwean sculptors in hard stones.

Works by Matemera and his colleagues were exhibited in the Rhodes National Gallery whose founding director, Frank McEwen, was very influential in bringing them to the attention of the international art community. Matemera first contributed to the Annual Exhibitions in the Gallery in 1967 and 1968: in 1969 McEwen took a group of works, mainly from Tengenenge, to the Museum of Modern Art in New York and elsewhere in the US, to critical acclaim.

== Later life and exhibitions ==
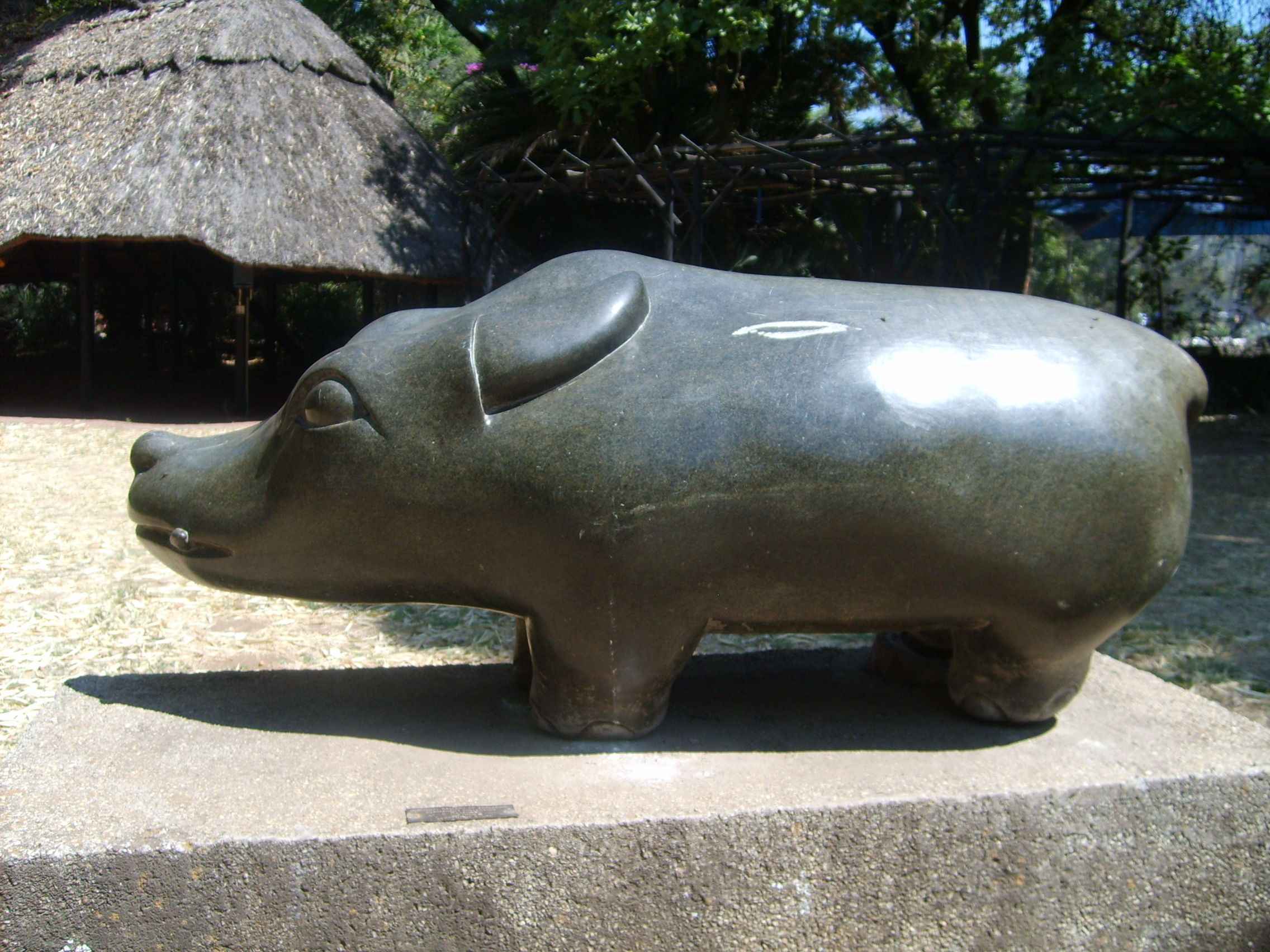
Warthog, 1986

Matemera had two wives, with whom he had eight children, and he stayed at Tengenenge throughout the war for Zimbabwean Independence at a time when many other artists abandoned their way of life. He became the symbolic leader of the community and from the 1980s gained worldwide recognition, with works included in exhibitions in the US, UK, Germany, The Netherlands and elsewhere.

Matemera's sculptures are in the permanent collections of the National Gallery of Zimbabwe, the Chapungu Sculpture Park, the Museum fur Völkerkunde, Frankfurt and many others. In 1987, Matemera was invited to Yugoslavia to make a large sculpture at the "Josip Broz Tito" Art Gallery of the Nonaligned Countries in Titograd. Celia Winter-Irving chose Matemera's work "Man turning into hippo" to illustrate the front cover of the paperback version of her classic book on Zimbabwean sculpture.

Many of Matemera's exhibition pieces, such as Great Spirit Woman (Serpentine, 1982), have toured worldwide; for example to the Yorkshire Sculpture Park in 1990, which depicts it on the front cover of the exhibition's catalogue. The catalogue "Chapungu: Culture and Legend – A Culture in Stone" for the exhibition at Kew Gardens in 2000 has pictures of this and four other of Matemera's sculptures: Chapungu (Serpentine) on p. 2, The Man who Ate his Totem (Springstone, 1998) on p. 42-43, Young Bull (Springstone, 1992) on p. 54-55, Metamorphosis (Springstone, 1995) on p. 94-95 and "Earth Spirit" (Serpentine, 1988) on p. 96-97. Several of these have characteristic rounded body-shapes and only two or three fingers or toes on each hand or foot. As explained by Olivier Sultan, "Matemera finds his inspiration in his dreams. He was haunted by 3-fingered beings, a residual myth or memory, of a tribe that live in the northern part of the country. His massive pieces have a bewitching character, halfway between the comic and the tragic." The British Museum has examples of his work in its permanent collection.

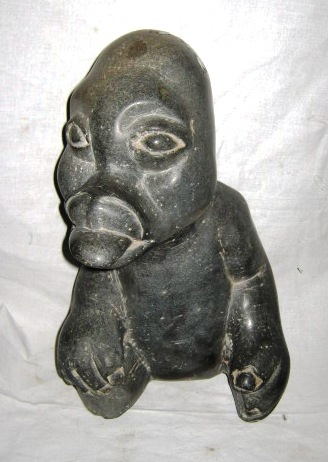
figure with exaggerated lips

Matemera sculpted mainly in grey or black serpentine, finishing his work to a uniform polished surface. His subjects were animals, people or fantasy spirit creatures. None were rendered in a true-to-life way: he preferred to show exaggerated curves of breast, buttock or belly-button to reveal the relationship between humans, animals and the spirit world. As Celia Winter-Irving commented in her biography of Matemera:

Matemera deals in pleasures of the flesh. To him sexuality means a healthy appetite, to be nourished with opportunity and spiced with variety. His sculptures speak in a highly suggestive body language. He is the creator of sculpture in the raw — huge naked figures with breasts, buttocks and bulges, charged with sexual energy and all at odds with their massive proportion and bulk.... There is in these sculptures an unspent power and a reserve of energy.

=== Selected solo or group exhibitions ===
- 1968 New African Art, MOMA, New York, US
- 1969 Lidchi Art Gallery, South Africa
- 1980 Feingarten Gallery, Los Angeles, US
- 1981 Art from Africa, London
- 1982 Janet Fleisher Gallery, Philadelphia, US
- 1985 Kresge Art Museum, Michigan, US
- 1988 African metamorphosis, National Gallery, Harare, Zimbabwe
- 1989 Whispering the Gospel of Sculpture, National Gallery of Zimbabwe
- 1989 Zimbabwe op de Berg, Foundation Beelden op de Berg, Wageningen, The Netherlands
- 1990 Contemporary, stone carving from Zimbabwe, Millesgarden Museum, Stockholm, Sweden and Yorkshire Sculpture Park, UK
- 1991 Milt Pinsel und Muszel, Germany
- 1992 Stone Sculpture, Zimbabwe, CCrt Galleries, UK
- 1994 Tengenenge Old Tengenenge New, Afrika Museum, Berg en Dal, The Netherlands
- 1997 Musee de Jardin, Paris, France
- 1998 Botanic Garden, Hamburg, Germany
- 2000 Chapungu: Custom and Legend – A Culture in Stone, Kew Gardens, UK

== Gallery ==
- African Contemporary Art Gallery

== See also ==
- Zimbabwean art
