= Tengenenge =

- Village
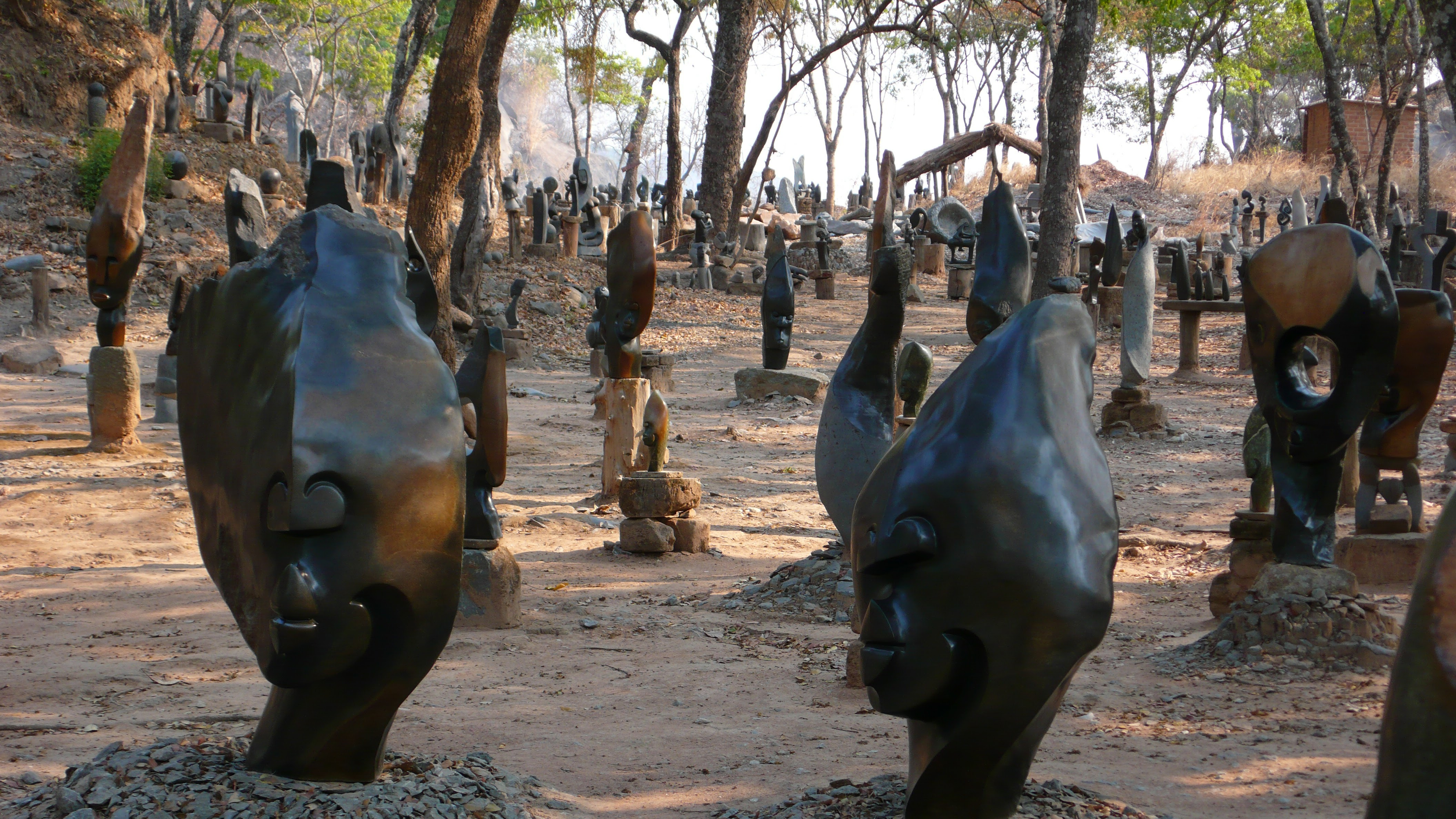

- Tengenenge in Zimbabwe
- Coordinates: 16°43′51″S 30°56′39″E
- Country: Zimbabwe
- Province: Mashonaland Central
- District: Guruve

Population
  - Estimate (2017): 450
- Time zone: UTC+2 (CAT)
- Website: www.tengenengeartcommunity.com

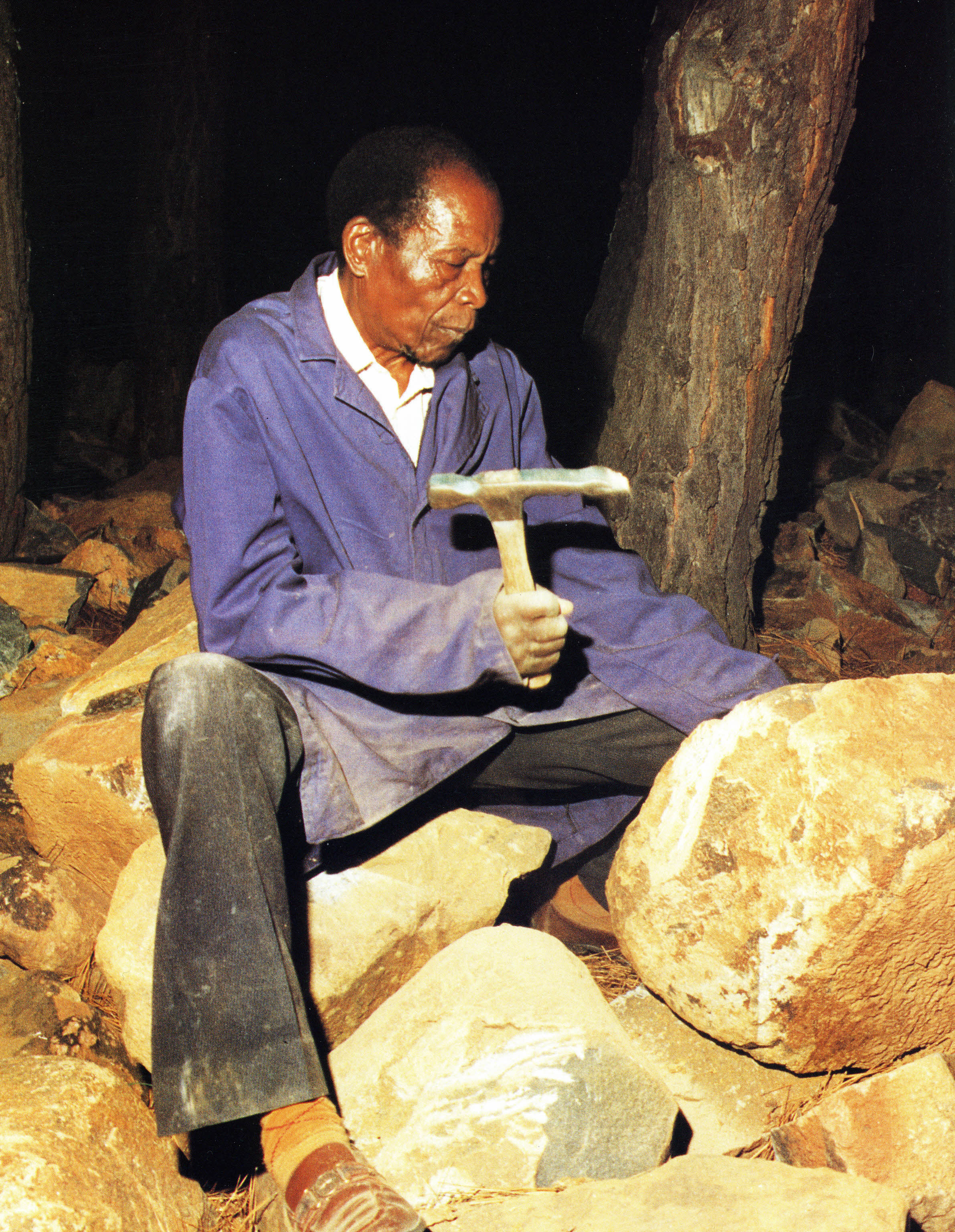
Henry Munyaradzi working with serpentine stone from Tengenenge

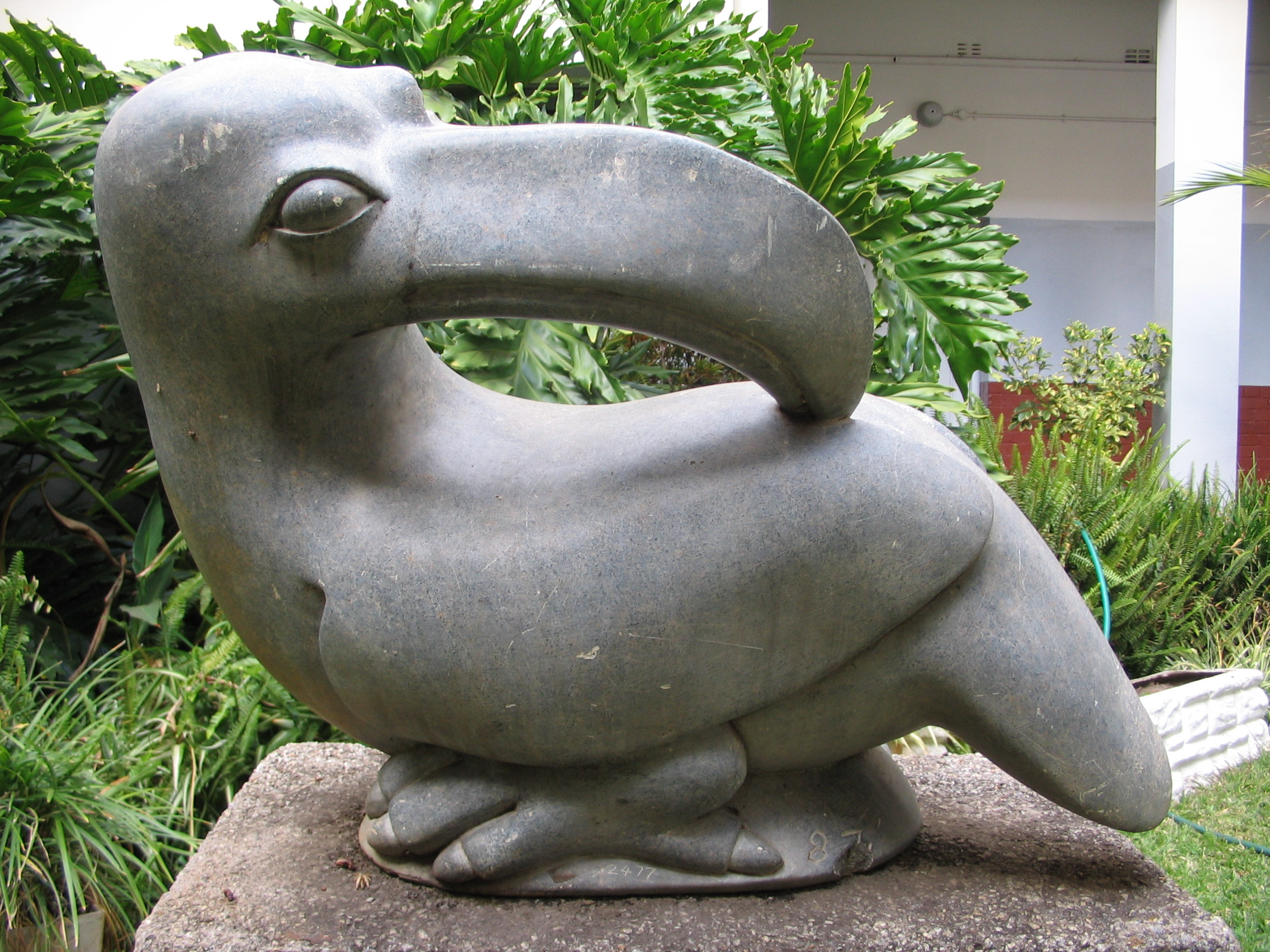
1973 carving of an eagle by Bernard Matemera

Tengenenge is a community of artists and their families located in the Guruve District of Zimbabwe. It has achieved international recognition because of the large number of sculptors who have lived and worked there since 1966, including Fanizani Akuda, Bernard Matemera, Sylvester Mubayi, Henry Munyaradzi, and Bernard Takawira.

== Establishment of the sculpture community ==
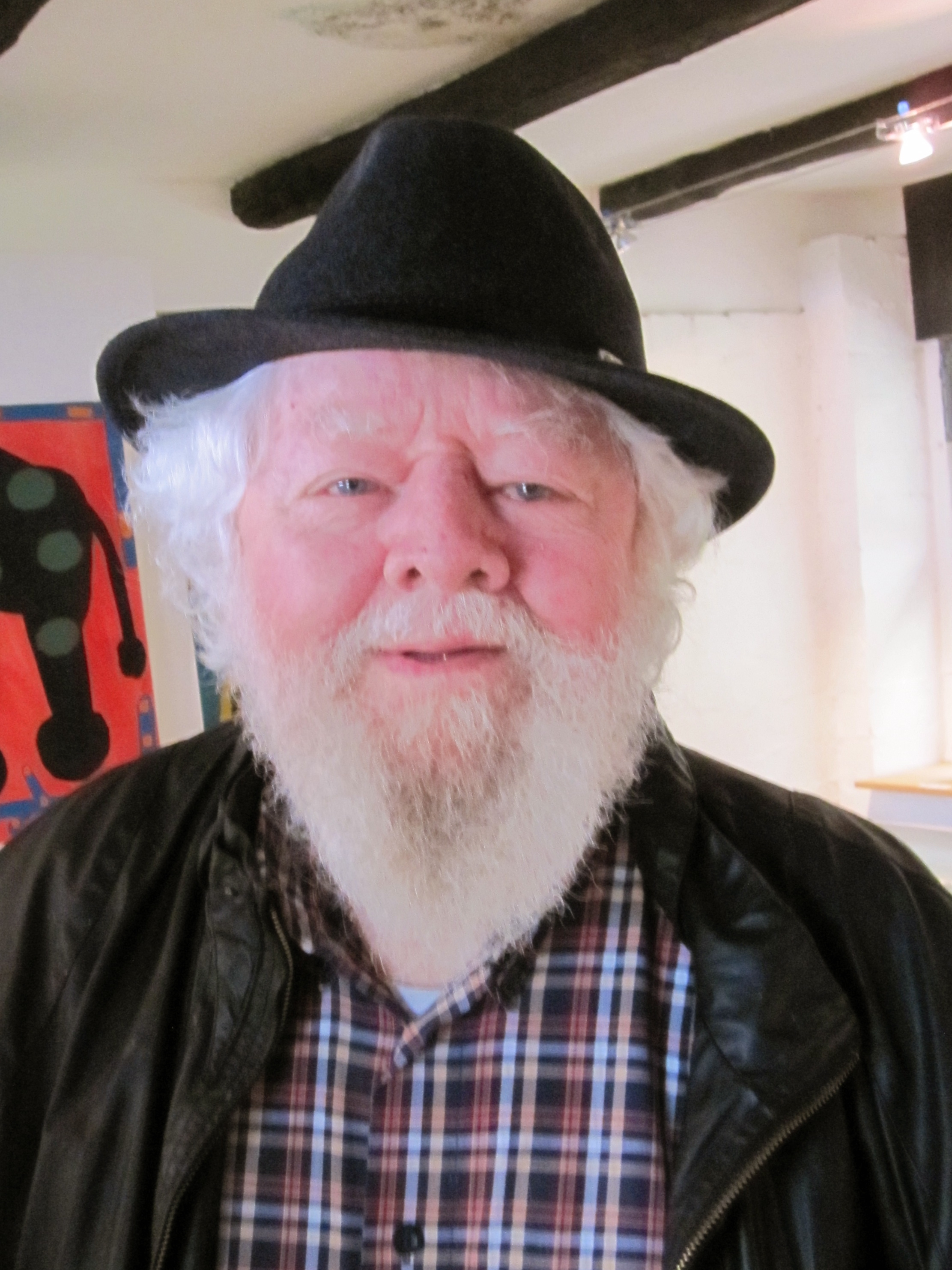
Tom Blomefield in 2012

The Tengenenge Sculpture Community was established by Tom Blomefield in 1966. He owned what had originally been a tobacco farm and chromium mine but found it was by then uneconomic, owing to the international sanctions against Rhodesia's white government led by Ian Smith, who had declared the Unilateral Declaration of Independence in 1965. Blomefield wrote that he sought an alternative source of income for his workforce, which materialised when the sculptor Crispen Chakanyuka visited and pointed out that the farm contained an outcrop of hard serpentine stone (part of the Great Dyke), which Blomfield obtained the rights to mine for use in sculpture. Appropriately, Tengenenge means The Beginning of the Beginning in the local Korekore dialect of the Shona language.

The works from the "first generation" of sculptors at Tengenenge joined those created by others who worked at the National Gallery of Rhodesia in Salisbury, where the then-director, Frank McEwen organised exhibitions both nationally and internationally, which started a group of artists whose output was sought after by collectors and made the names of many, including Fanizani Akuda, Amali Malola, Bernard Matemera, Leman Moses, Sylvester Mubayi, Henry Munyaradzi, and Bernard Takawira, who had spent time at Tengenenge.

McEwen and Blomefield diverged in their opinion about how the growing local sculpture movement should evolve. Blomefield encouraged many individual artists from a number of countries including Angola, Malawi, and Mozambique to join the local community of mainly Shona ethnicity, unconcerned whether they had formal training. McEwen had a narrower vision and set up a workshop school at the National Gallery to train those he favoured. Tensions between the two grew until McEwen was deported from Rhodesia by the white minority government in 1973, ironically for "daring to empower blacks".

== Later developments ==
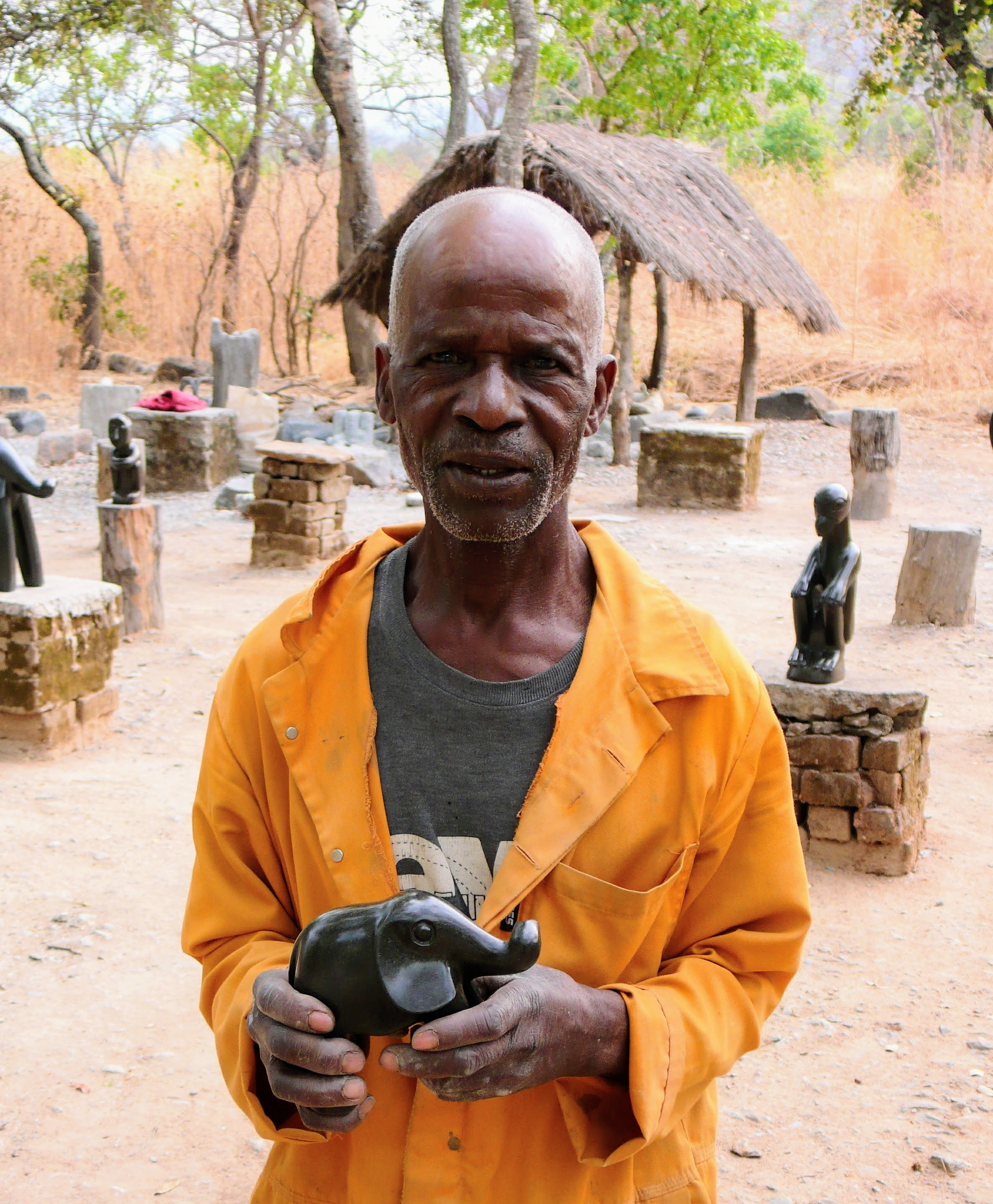
Biriyo Fernando holding an elephant sculpture in 2017

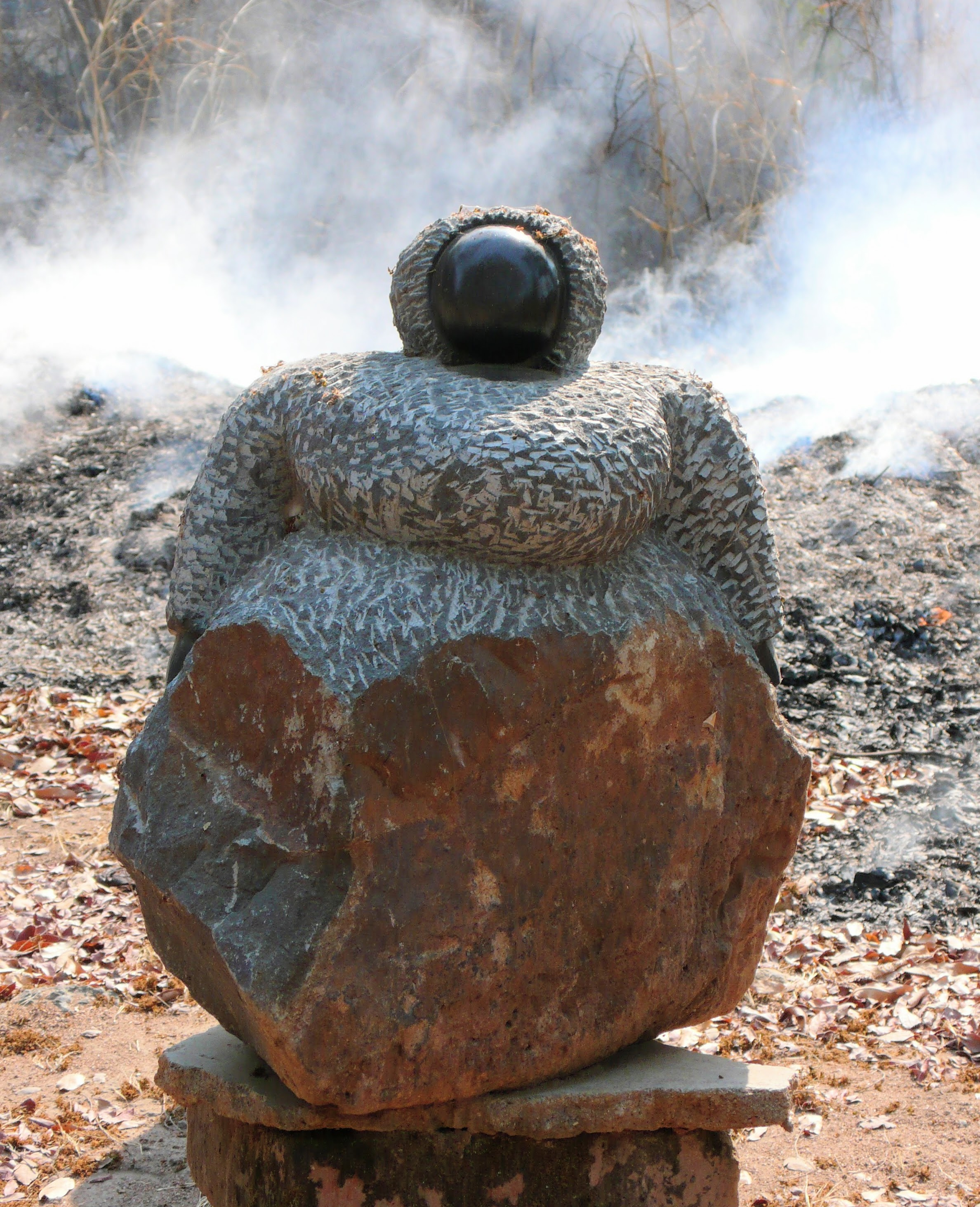
Sculpture by Rumbidzai Gomo

In 1973, Blomefield sold his farm and moved to Harare, although the community at Tengenenge continued to produce sculptures. By 1979 the countryside there was occupied by those fighting for independence in the guerilla war and most of the artists had gone. In December 1979, the Lancaster House Agreement was signed, allowing the country to achieve internationally recognised independence in 1980. The artists' community slowly re-formed, especially after Blomefield returned in 1985, which encouraged others to do the same. In 1989, the accessibility for visitors to Tengenenge improved with the opening of a tar road; and in that year a number of international exhibitions of the sculptors' work were organised, including one in Europe: Beelden op de Berg in Wageningen, the Netherlands. In 1998, a video about Tengenenge was produced which led a reviewer to comment that:

Tengenenge's strongest feature is the honesty with which it faces the controversial issue of the quality of the work made at the site. This point of contention is by no means limited to that community, but it is particularly extreme because of the large number of people who work there.

By 2000, up to 300 artists had lived at Tengenenge at various times but some visitors were critical of the unsanitary conditions and lack of education for workers' children. Others, including Celia Winter-Irving, who had spent several months living at Tengenenge and wrote extensively about the sculpture and the artists, was much more supportive, believing that:

[Blomefield]'s mentorship had little sense of the paternalism of white supremacy....nor has he imposed his European way of life and its values upon the artists.

Blomefield continued in his role as director of Tengenenge until 2007, when he was succeeded by Dominic Benhura, also a well-known sculptor. In 2011, a management team of five artists was formed. Other artists who have worked at Tengenenge include Square Chikwanda, Sanwell Chirume, Edward Chiwawa, Barankinya Gosta, Makina Kameya, and Jonathan Mhondorohuma.

Tom Blomefield died on 8 April 2020, aged 95, in the Netherlands; his ashes were buried at Tengenenge on 6 December 2020.

== Current status ==
Although art sales sustained over 1200 community members at the height of Tengenenge's success, by 2020 Zimbabwe's lengthy economic hardship had taken its toll. The tourist industry had virtually collapsed and new opportunities were scarce.

== See also ==
- Sculpture of Zimbabwe
