= Sculpture of Zimbabwe =

Three-dimensional stone artwork made in Zimbabwe

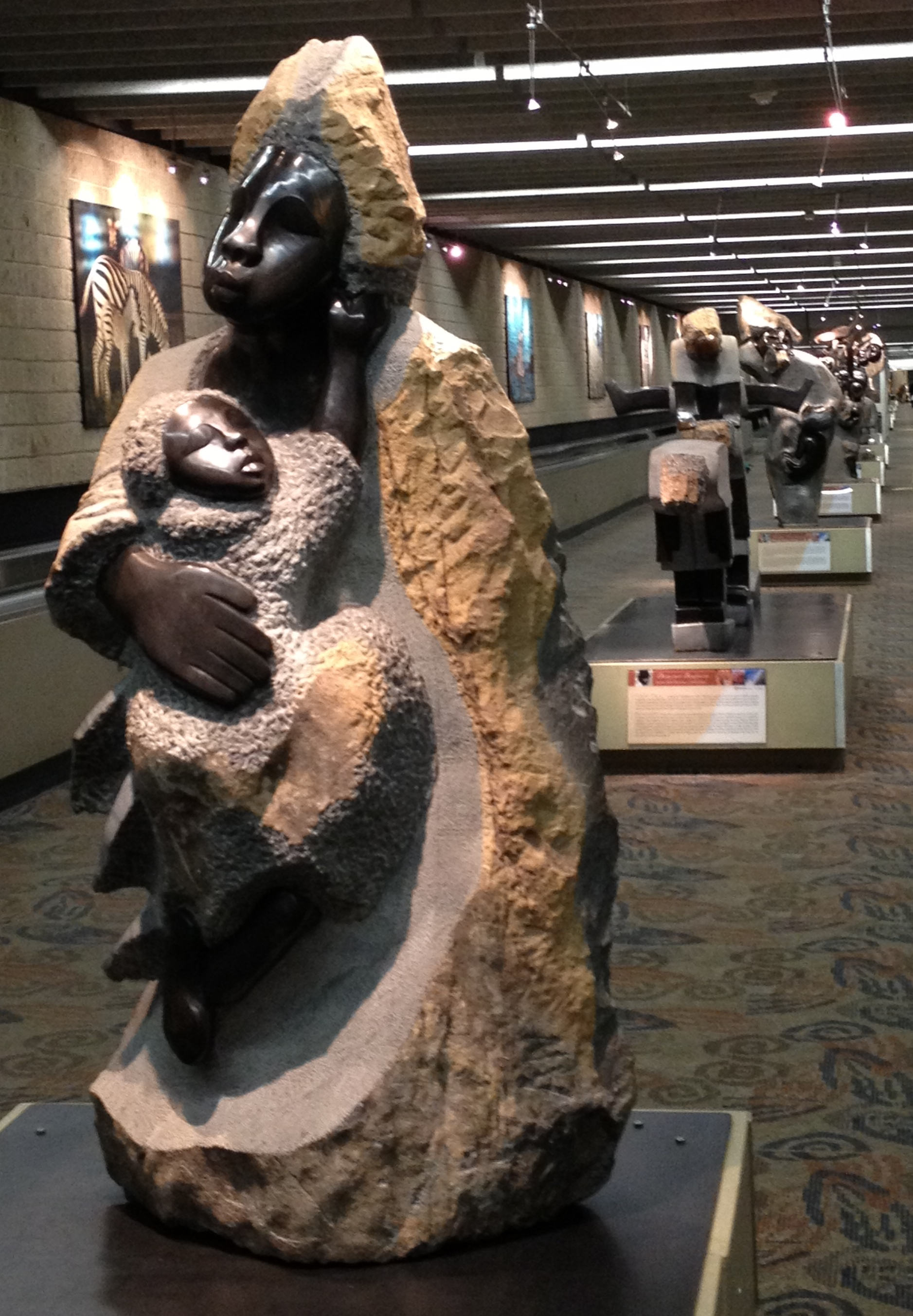
Zimbabwe Sculpture: a Tradition in Stone, Atlanta, USA, at Hartsfield-Jackson Atlanta International Airport between concourses T and A

Sculpture and in particular stone sculpture is an art for which Zimbabwe is well known around the world.

== Origins ==
Central Zimbabwe contains the "Great Dyke"—a source of serpentine rocks of many types including a hard variety locally called springstone. An early pre-colonial culture of Shona peoples settled the high plateau around 900 AD and “Great Zimbabwe”, which dates from about 1250–1450 AD, was a stone-walled town showing evidence in its archaeology of skilled stone working. The walls were made of a local granite and no mortar was used in their construction. When excavated, six soapstone birds and a soapstone bowl were found in the eastern enclosure of the monument; so art forms in soapstone were part of that early culture and local inhabitants were already artistically predisposed, fashioning works from various natural materials such as fibres, wood, clay, and stone for functional, aesthetic, and ritual purposes.

However, stone carving as art had no direct lineage to the present day and it was only in 1954 that its modern renaissance began. This was when Frank McEwen became advisor to the new Rhodes National Gallery to be built in Harare and from 1955 to 1973 was its founding director (it opened in 1957). He met with Thomas Mukarobgwa, a young indigenous artist steeped in rural knowledge and spirituality, and offered him an opportunity to pursue a career in art. Mukarobgwa became "the perfect mentor to guide the director of the new gallery into the ways and mores of the African people". It was an introduction to local artist Joram Mariga and his early soft stone carvings that prompted McEwen to encourage early soapstone carvers to create works that reflected their culture.

The Workshop School established by the gallery soon attracted more artists, many of whom had already been exposed to some form of art training from early mission schools and were established art practitioners. These included Joseph Ndandarika, John Takawira and Kingsley Sambo. Although the budding art movement was relatively slow to develop, it was given massive impetus in 1966 by Tom Blomefield, a white South-African-born farmer of tobacco whose farm at Tengenenge near Guruve had extensive deposits of serpentine stone suitable for carving. A sculptor in stone himself, Blomefield wanted to diversify the use of his land and welcomed new sculptors onto it to form a community of working artists. This was in part because at that time there were international sanctions against Rhodesia’s white government, then led by Ian Smith, who had declared Unilateral Declaration of Independence in 1965; and tobacco was no longer able to generate sufficient income. Appropriately, Tengenenge means The Beginning of the Beginning—in this case of a significant new enterprise.

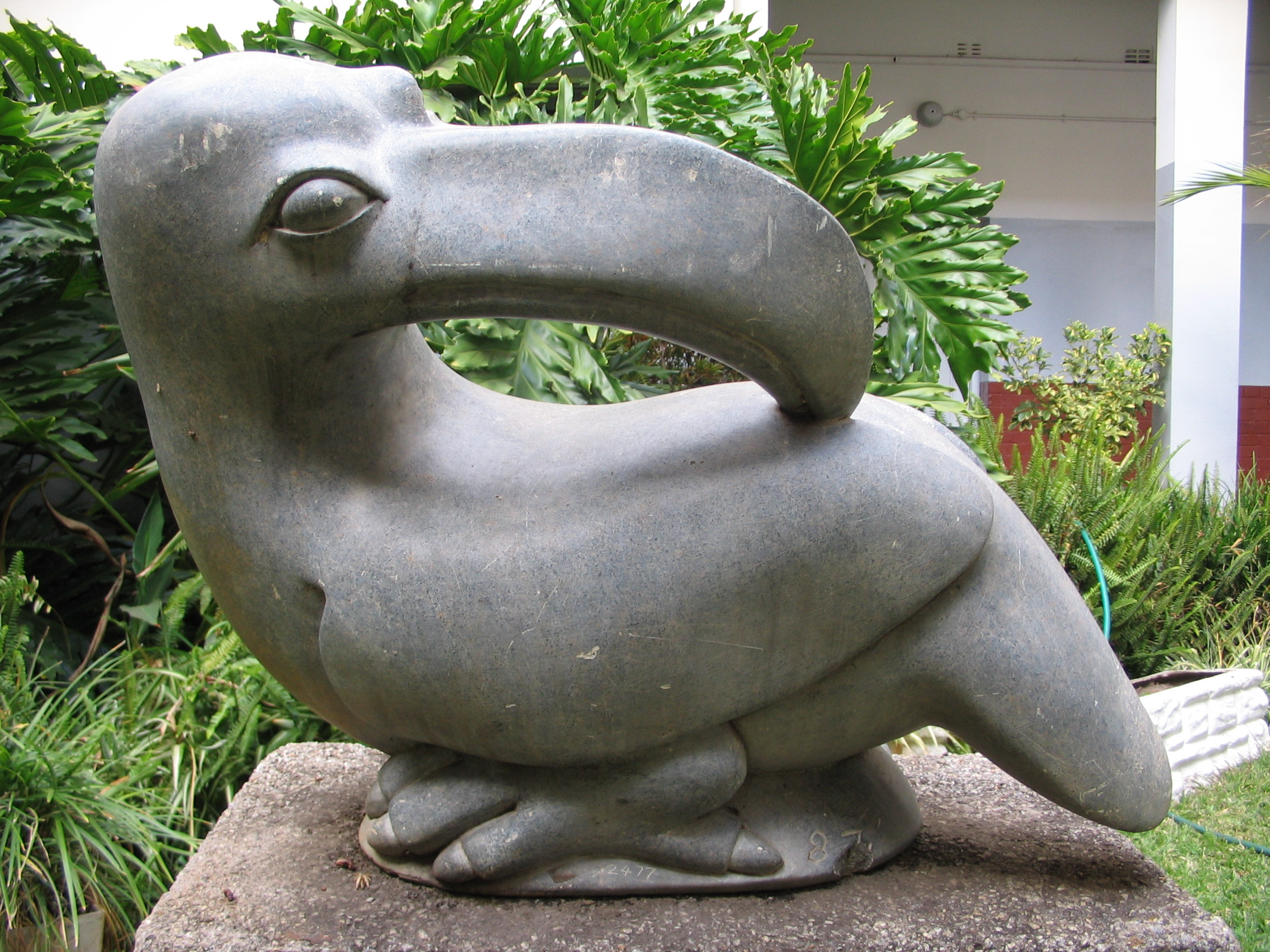
1973 carving of an eagle by Bernard Matemera

=== First-generation sculptors of the 20th century ===
Further details of the establishment of the "first generation" of new Shona sculptors are given in the individual biographies of its leading members: Bernard Matemera, Sylvester Mubayi, Henry Mukarobgwa, Thomas Mukarobgwa, Henry Munyaradzi, Joram Mariga, Joseph Ndandarika, and Bernard Takawira and his brother John. This group also includes the Mukomberanwa family (Nicholas Mukomberanwa and his protégés Anderson Mukomberanwa, Lawrence Mukomberanwa, Taguma Mukomberanwa, Netsai Mukomberanwa, Ennica Mukomberanwa, and Nesbert Mukomberanwa). All these artists have created works that have been exhibited worldwide, several of which are now included in the McEwen bequest to the British Museum.

During its early years of growth, the nascent Shona sculpture movement was described as an art renaissance, an art phenomenon, and a miracle. Critics and collectors could not understand how an art genre had developed with such vigour, spontaneity, and originality in an area of Africa that had none of the great sculptural heritage of West Africa and had previously been described in terms of the visual arts as artistically barren.

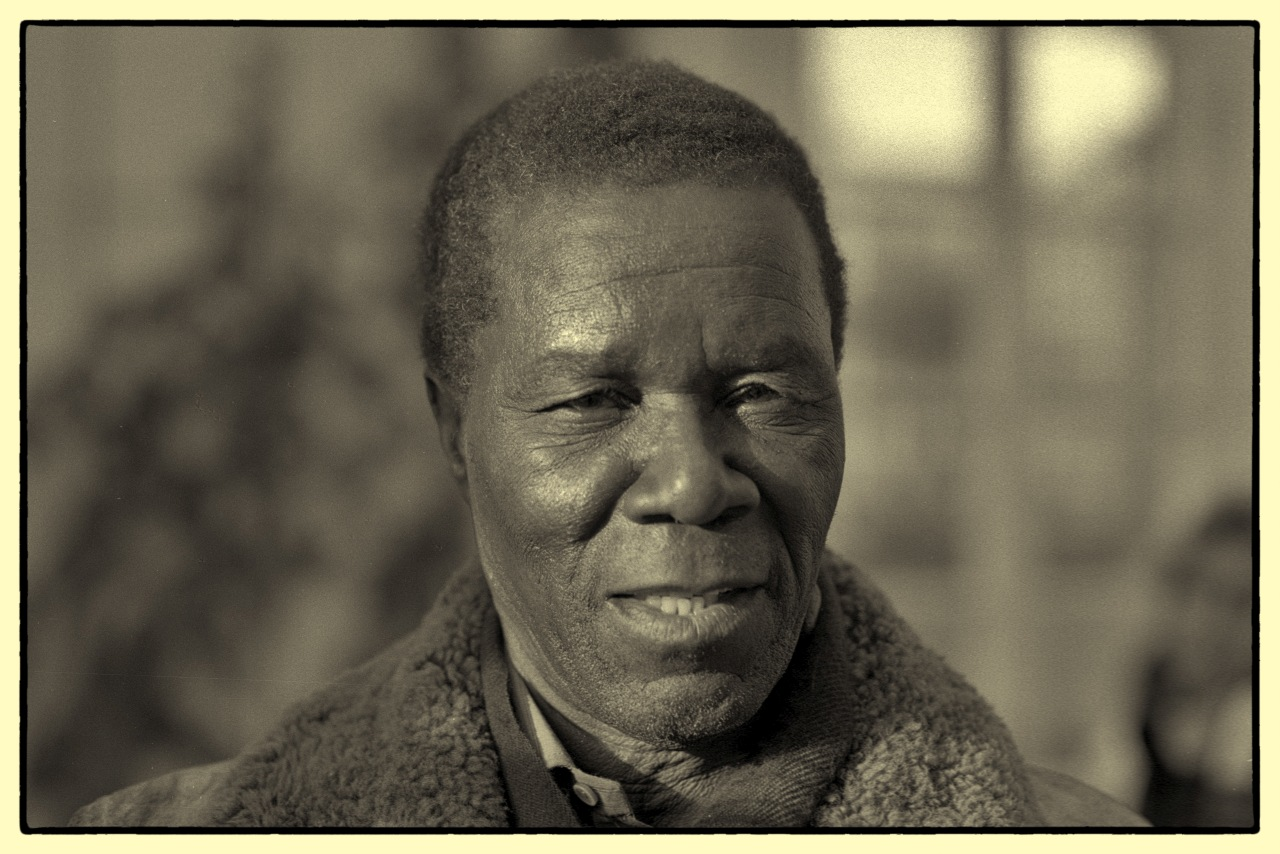
Joram Mariga,"father of stone sculpture" in Zimbabwe

Fifteen years of sanctions against Rhodesia limited the international exposure of the sculpture. Nevertheless, owing mainly to the efforts of Frank McEwen, the work was shown in several international exhibitions, some of which are listed below. This pre-independence period witnessed the honing of technical skills, the deepening of expressive power, the use of harder and different types of stones, and the creation of many outstanding works. The Shona sculpture movement was well underway and had many patrons and advocates.

- 1963 New Art from Rhodesia, Commonwealth Arts Festival, Royal Festival Hall, London
- 1968-69 New African Art: The Central African Workshop School, MOMA, New York (toured in USA)
- 1969 Contemporary African Arts, Camden Arts Centre, London
- 1970 Sculptures Contemporaine de Vukutu, Musée d’Art Moderne de la Ville de Paris
- 1971 Sculpture Contemporaine des Shonas d’Afrique, Musée Rodin, Paris
- 1971 Gallery 101, Johannesburg
- 1971 Artists Gallery, Cape Town
- 1972 Shona sculptures of Rhodesia, ICA Gallery, London
- 1972 Galerie Helliggyst, Copenhagen
- 1972 MOMA, New York
- 1979 Kunst Aus Africa, Berlin; Staatlichen Kunstalle went to Bremen and Stockholm
- 1979 Feingarten Gallery, Los Angeles

== Post-Independence ==
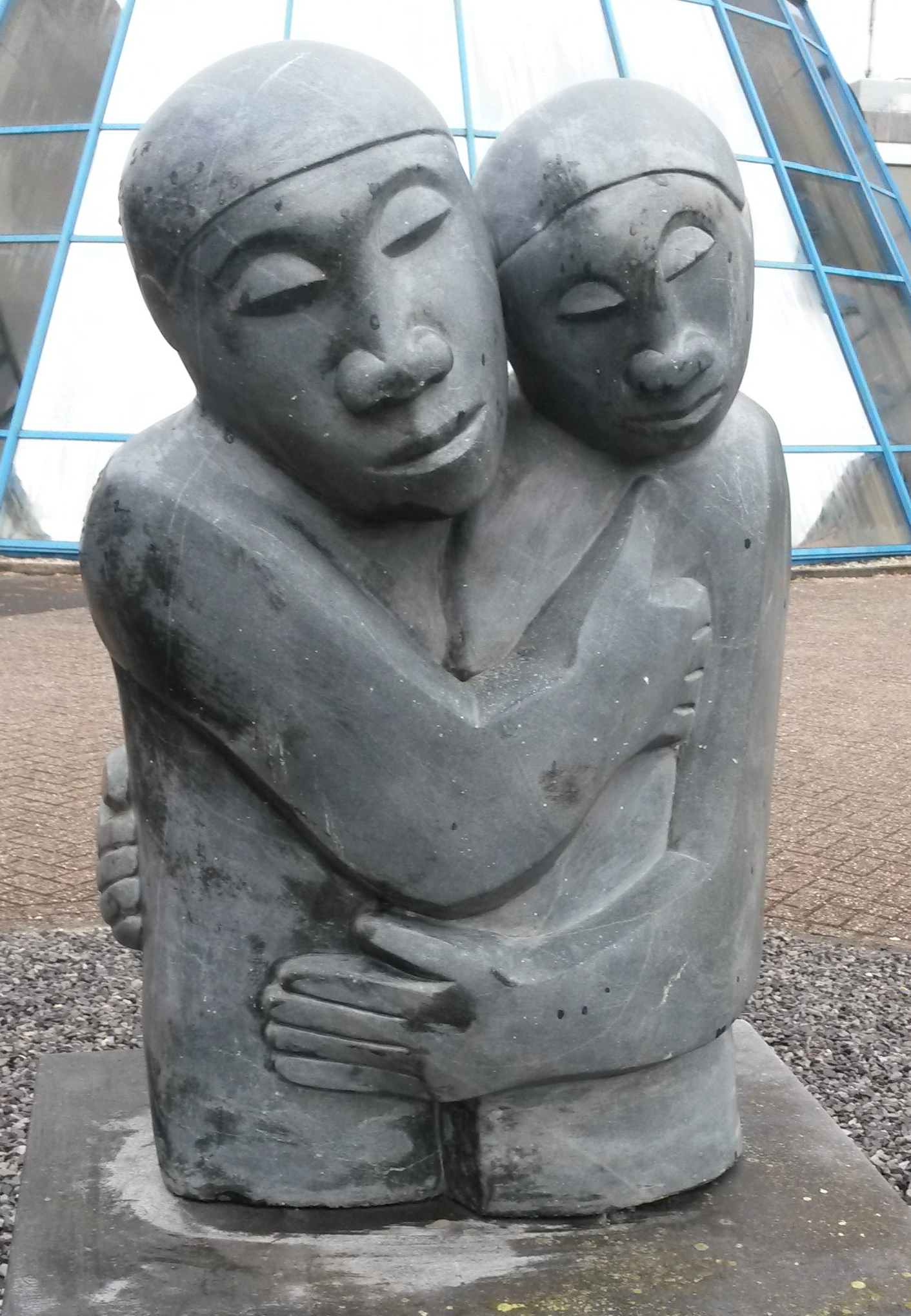
Reconciliation by Amos Supuni

Since independence in 1980, Shona sculpture has continued to be exhibited in the art capitals of the world; and great acclaim has accrued to contemporary artists such as Dominic Benhura and Tapfuma Gutsa and the art form itself.

Support and encouragement has come from many sources.

1. Sponsors of a variety of sculpture communities, of which those at Tengenenge and Chapungu have been most influential. Further communities have developed post-independence; for example, the Chitungwiza Arts Centre, which was an initiative involving the United Nations Development Programme, and the Zimbabwe Ministry of Education and Culture, which provided the land.
2. Commercial sponsors in Zimbabwe, including AVAC Arts, the Baringa Corporation, the Nedlaw Investment and Trust Corporation, Zimre Holdings Limited, BAT (who part-fund the Workshop School of the National Gallery) and Mobil (who support the Gallery's annual Zimbabwe Heritage exhibition).
3. The Zimbabwean Government, especially through its support for the National Gallery, which now has regional centres in Bulawayo and Mutare in addition to commissioning pieces of art such as a statue of Robert Mugabe.
4. Patrons who buy works or write forewords to catalogues for international exhibitions. Examples of well-known individuals in this category include Richard Attenborough, Richard E. Grant, and Joshua Nkomo.
5. Other notable contributors to the sector, including AVAC Arts, founded by Terrence T. Musiyiwa in 2003, that created one of the first websites in Zimbabwe to promote international art trade from the country and show how the Internet could be used as a tool to promote adaptation and utilisation of new technologies towards improved art-community livelihoods.
6. A group of specialist dealers who display the works in their galleries worldwide and communicate their own enthusiasm for this art form to visitors, who by viewing, purchasing, and enjoying the objects spread that enthusiasm.

Roy Guthrie quoted a 1991 article in The Sunday Telegraph in his introduction to an exhibition in South Africa to remind art lovers that:

There is a widespread assumption today that art must necessarily be international.... But against this trend one finds isolated pockets of resistance, which suggest that good art can (and perhaps must) be a local affair – the product of a particular place and culture. And one of the most remarkable in the contemporary world is the school of sculptors that has flourished among the Shona tribe of Zimbabwe in the last 30 years... placed beside the dismal stuff so beloved of the international art bureaucracy – as they were in the 1990 Biennale – these African carvings shine out in a desolate world.

In spite of increasing worldwide demand for the sculptures, little of what McEwen feared might be an "airport art" style of commercialization has occurred. As of 50 years past the first tentative steps towards a new sculptural tradition, many Zimbabwean artists make their living from full-time sculpting. The sculptures they produce often represent common human experiences or emotions, such as grief, elation, humor, anxiety, or spiritual search, and are often communicated in a simple and direct way. The artist "works" together with his stone, and believe that "nothing which exists naturally is inanimate", interpreting them as having a spirit and life of its own. They are aware of the stone's contribution in the finished sculpture and a range of stones are available to artists, such as springstone, serpentine, soapstones, limestone, verdite, and lepidolite.

Jonathan Zilberg has pointed out that there is a parallel market within Zimbabwe for what he calls flow sculptures—the subject matter of which is the family (ukama in Shona)—and which are produced throughout the country, from suburban Harare to Guruve in the northeast and Mutare in the east. These readily available and inexpensive forms of sculpture are, he believes, of more interest to local black Zimbabweans than the semi-abstract figurative sculptures of the type mainly seen in museums and exported to overseas destinations. The flow sculptures are still capable of demonstrating innovation in art and most are individually carved, in styles characteristic of the individual artists.

Another artist, Bryn Taurai Mteki, created a large sculpture titled Chippi, which was unveiled during the sixth All-Africa Games, hosted in Zimbabwe in September 1995. This sculpture also served as the games mascot. It is 2.5 metres high and is now displayed at the National Sports Stadium in Harare alongside the Games' Flame as a part of the permanent collection. In 1996 Mteki, now living in Europe, was honoured with silver medals from Oelsnitz, Auerbach, and Adorf in Germany.

Some sculptors in Zimbabwe work in media other than stone. For example, at Zimbabwe Heritage 1988, Paul Machowani won an Award of Distinction for his metal piece Ngozi and in 1992 Joseph Chanota’s metal piece Thinking of the Drought won the same award. Bulawayo has been a centre for metal sculpture, with artists such as David Ndlovu and Adam Madebele. Arthur Azevedo, who works in Harare and creates welded metal sculptures, won the President’s Award of Honour at the First Mobil Zimbabwe Heritage Biennale in 1998. Wood carving also has a long history in Zimbabwe, some of the leading exponents of which are Zephania Tshuma and Morris Tendai.

== International exhibitions ==
Joram Mariga talks to Detlef Hansen about the story of stone sculpture in Zimbabwe ( rec. 1994)

- 1982 Janet Fleischer Gallery, Philadelphia, USA
- 1984 Henry of Tengenenge, Commonwealth Institute, London
- 1985 Kunstschätze aus Afrika, Frankfurt, Germany
- 1985 Henry of Tengenenge, Feingarten Gallery, Los Angeles, USA
- 1989 Zimbabwe op de Berg, Foundation Beelden op de Berg, Wageningen, The Netherlands
- 1990 Contemporary Stone Carving from Zimbabwe, Yorkshire Sculpture Park, UK
- 1990 Zimbabwe Heritage (National Gallery of Zimbabwe), Auckland, New Zealand
- 1994 The Magic of Henry, Contemporary Fine Art Gallery Eton, Berkshire, UK
- 2000 Chapungu: Custom and Legend—A Culture in Stone, Kew Gardens, UK
- 2001 Tengenenge Art, Celia Winter-Irving, World Art Foundation, The Netherlands
- 2001 (Permanent exhibition): Zimbabwe Sculpture: a Tradition in Stone, Atlanta, USA, at Hartsfield-Jackson Atlanta International Airport. Works by Agnes Nyanhongo, Gedion Nyanhongo, Norbert Shamuyarira, Lameck Bonjisi, Edronce Rukodzi, Sylvester Mubayi, Joe Mutasa, Nicholas Mukomberanwa, Gladman Zinyeka, Tapfuma Gutsa, and Amos Supuni.
- 2004–05 Treasures from Zimbabwe: African Shona Stone Sculpture, David Barnett Gallery, Milwaukee, USA
- 2008 Spirits in Stone—Art and Animals of Africa, San Diego Natural History Museum
- 2014 Abu Dhabi, [United Arab Emirates] Exhibitions & Commissioned Art work

== Prospects ==
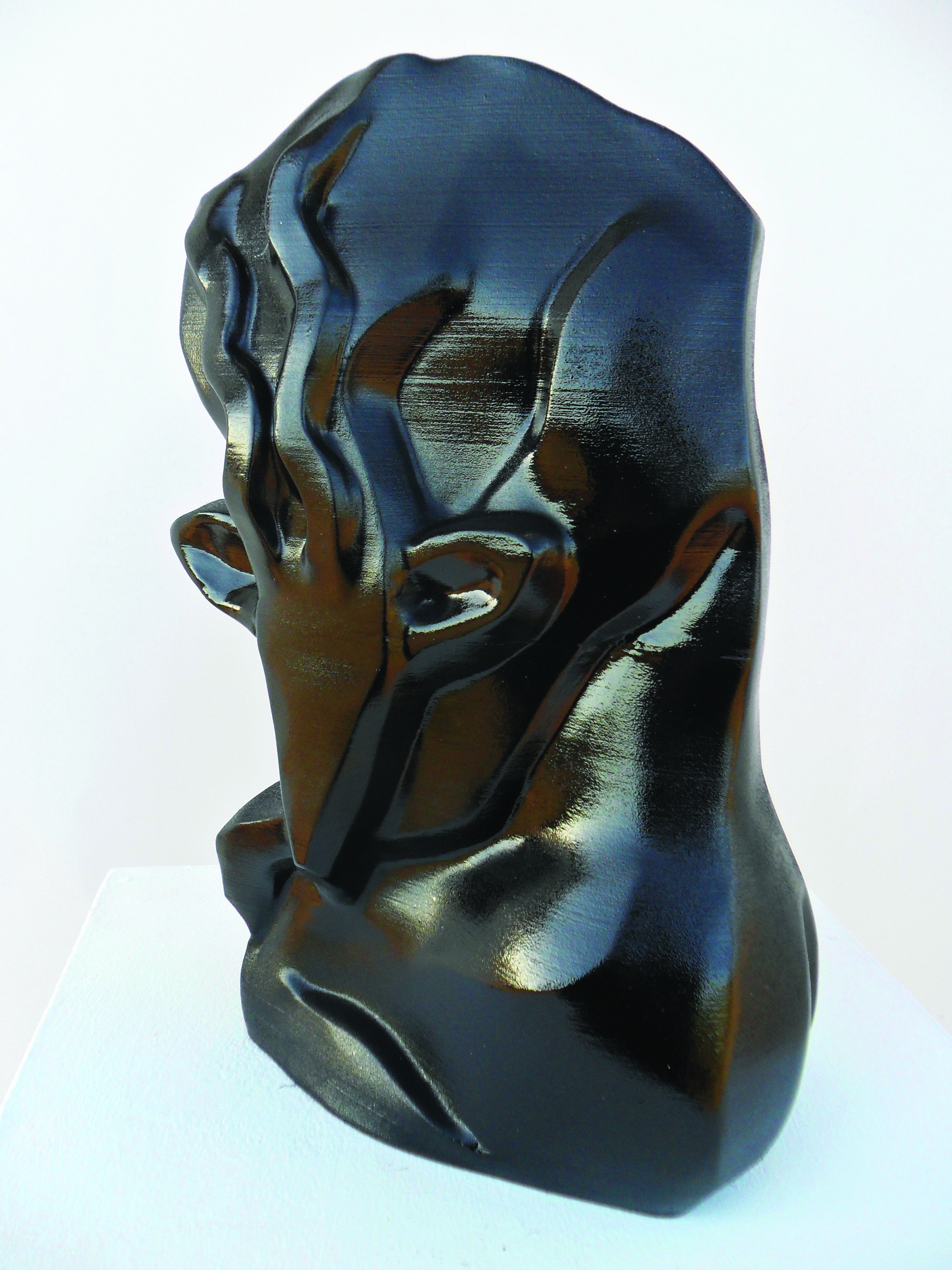
3D printed Shona Sculpture by Boarding Dzinotizei

In 2017 computerised sculpting was introduced by the visual artist Boarding Dzinotizei. His digital Shona sculptures comment on the Zimbabwean society through 3D printing. The message conveyed represents a loss in the significance of totems in Shona culture. This loss is being portrayed, in this case, through simplified forms and missing body parts.

The current poor economic conditions in Zimbabwe and recent hyper-inflation means that it is increasingly difficult for its artists to prosper and make a living from full-time sculpting.

== See also ==
- Art of Zimbabwe
- Chapungu Sculpture Park
- Tengenenge
- Category:Zimbabwean sculptors
