= Shamuyarira =

Shamuyarira is a surname. Notable people with the surname include:

- Nathan Shamuyarira (1928–2014), Zimbabwean nationalist
- Norbert Shamuyarira (born 1962), Zimbabwean sculptor
