= Gosta =

Gosta may refer to:

- Barankinya Gosta (1935–1998), prominent Zimbabwean Chewa sculptor
- Gosta Green, area in the city of Birmingham, England
- Gosta River, tributary of the Valea Padeşului River in Romania
- Predrag Gosta (born 1972), Serbian-born conductor, harpsichordist and baritone

== See also ==
- Gösta (disambiguation)
