= Fanizani Akuda =

Zimbabwean sculptor

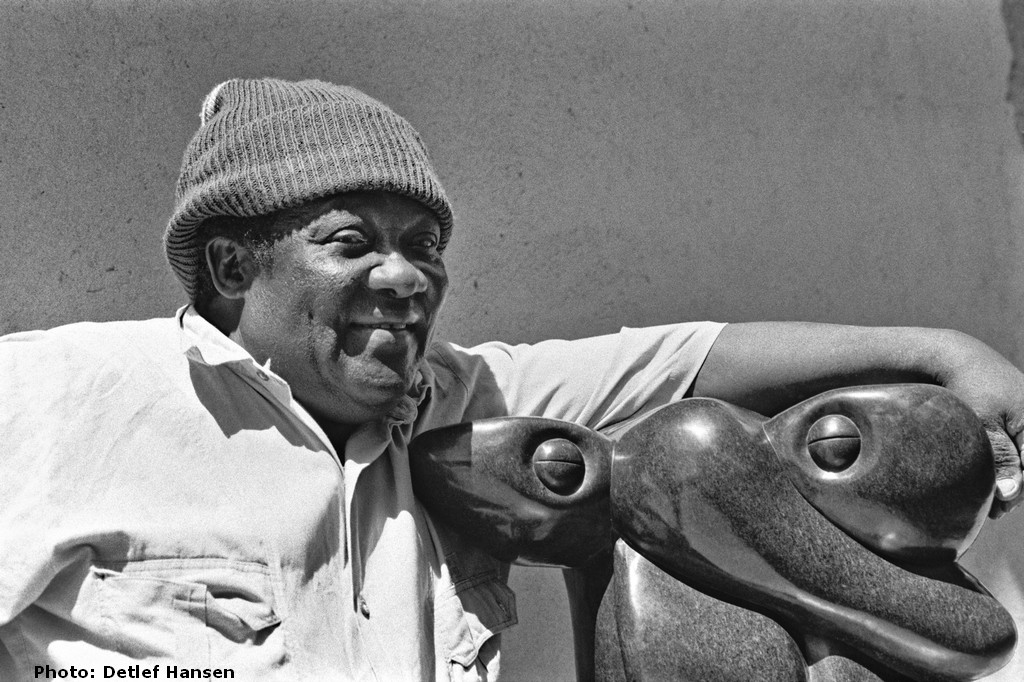
- Born: Fanizani Akuda; 11 November 1932; Mteya, Zambia
- Died: 5 February 2011 (aged 78)
- Other names: Fanizani Phiri
- Known for: Sculpture
- Movement: Shona sculpture
- Awards: Highly Commended, Zimbabwe Heritage Exhibition, 1988

Fanizani Akuda (11 November 1932 – 5 February 2011), also known as Fanizani Phiri, was a Zimbabwean sculptor. He was a member of the sculptural movement "Shona sculpture" (see Shona art), although he and some others of its recognised members were not ethnically Shona. He worked initially at the Tengenenge Sculpture Community, 150 km north of Harare near Guruve, which he joined in 1966.

== Early life and education ==
Fanizani Akuda, an ethnic Chewa, was born in 1932 in what was then Northern Rhodesia. He received no formal schooling and in 1949 he moved to Southern Rhodesia in search of work. This led to employment as a cotton picker, bricklayer, and basket weaver: by 1966 he was working as a farm manager. However, in terms of his later success as a sculptor in stone, the most significant move came in that year when he was offered work by Tom Blomefield, a white South-African-born farmer of tobacco whose farm at Tengenenge near Guruve had extensive deposits of serpentine stone suitable for carving. Fanizani was initially a quarryman but after a period living in the artists’ community he took up sculpting: finding this provided a worthwhile financial return, he became a full-time sculptor alongside other well-known figures such as Henry Munyaradzi.

== Later life and exhibitions ==
Akuda and his wife Erina had seven children. They had left Tengenenge in 1975 during the civil war, taking residence in Chitungwiza. After Zimbabwe’s independence in 1980, Tengenenge Sculpture Community re-established itself as a major sculpting centre but Fanizani did not return there. He continued to sculpt independently until his death in 2011.

In 1988, Fanizani’s sculpture Snake Man was highly commended in the Zimbabwe Heritage Exhibition, the annual exhibition of the National Gallery of Zimbabwe. Another of his 1988 works, I know you have stolen my eggs is pictured in the catalogue for the touring exhibition that visited European venues including the Yorkshire Sculpture Park in 1990

Akuda is probably best known for his ‘whistler’ figures. In these stylised heads, the prototypical face with its slit eyes is given a thin mouth line with a simple centrally placed borehole. This gives the ‘whistlers’ an acoustic trait: by tapping a thumb on the sculpture’s mouth, one can create a characteristic sound from the sculpture’s lips.

Olivier Sultan said of his work

"His characters are tender and humorous, constantly smiling, with mysterious slit eyes. They are often formed in pairs or groups. To Fanizani, family represents a poetic world, moving in its simplicity and its tenderness."

Fanizani died on 5 February 2011.

== Solo and group exhibitions ==
- 1967 to 1997: many Annual Heritage Exhibitions at the National Gallery, Harare
- 1970 Museum of Malawi, Blantyre
- 1980 "Tengenenge Stone Sculpture from Africa", Feingarten Galleries, Los Angeles, USA
- 1981 "Art from Africa", Commonwealth Institute, London, England
- 1982 Janet Fleisher Gallery, Philadelphia, USA
- 1983 Images in Stone, Earl Sherman Gallery, Camerillo, California, USA
- 1985 "Zimbabwean Stone Sculpture", Kresge Art Museum, Michigan, USA
- 1986 Irving Sculpture Gallery, Sydney, Australia
- 1989 Zimbabwe op de Berg, Foundation Beelden op de Berg, Wageningen, The Netherlands
- 1990 Contemporary Stone Carving from Zimbabwe, Yorkshire Sculpture Park, UK
- 1993 Galerie Knud Grothe, Charlottenlund, Denmark
- 1995 Ointmoetting in Hamonie, Galerie de Strang, Dodewaard, The Netherlands
- 1998 Zimbabwe stenen Getuigenissen, Royal Museum for Central Africa, Tervuren, Belgium
- 2000 Kew Gardens, London, England
- 2005 The Legend of Zimbabwe's Stone Sculpture: Fanizani Akuda, solo retrospective, National Gallery of Zimbabwe, Harare, Zimbabwe
- 2006 Master Sculptors of Zimbabwe, Group exhibition, Italy

== See also ==
- Zimbabwean art
