= Edward Chiwawa =

Zimbabwean sculptor

- Born: Edward; 9 March 1935; Guruve
- Died: October 2022 (aged 87)
- Citizenship: Zimbabwe
- Occupation: Sculptor
- Known for: art of sculpture

Edward Chiwawa (born 1935) is a Zimbabwean sculptor. Born northwest of Guruve, in 1960 he started how to sculpt by working with his cousin, Henry Munyaradzi. From 1970 he was a resident of the Tengenenge Sculpture Community, he sold his sculptures from Tengenenge, but he never moved in there. His sculptures are often heavily abstracted. Chiwawa has exhibited in Europe and Australia.
