= Henry Munyaradzi =

Zimbabwean sculptor

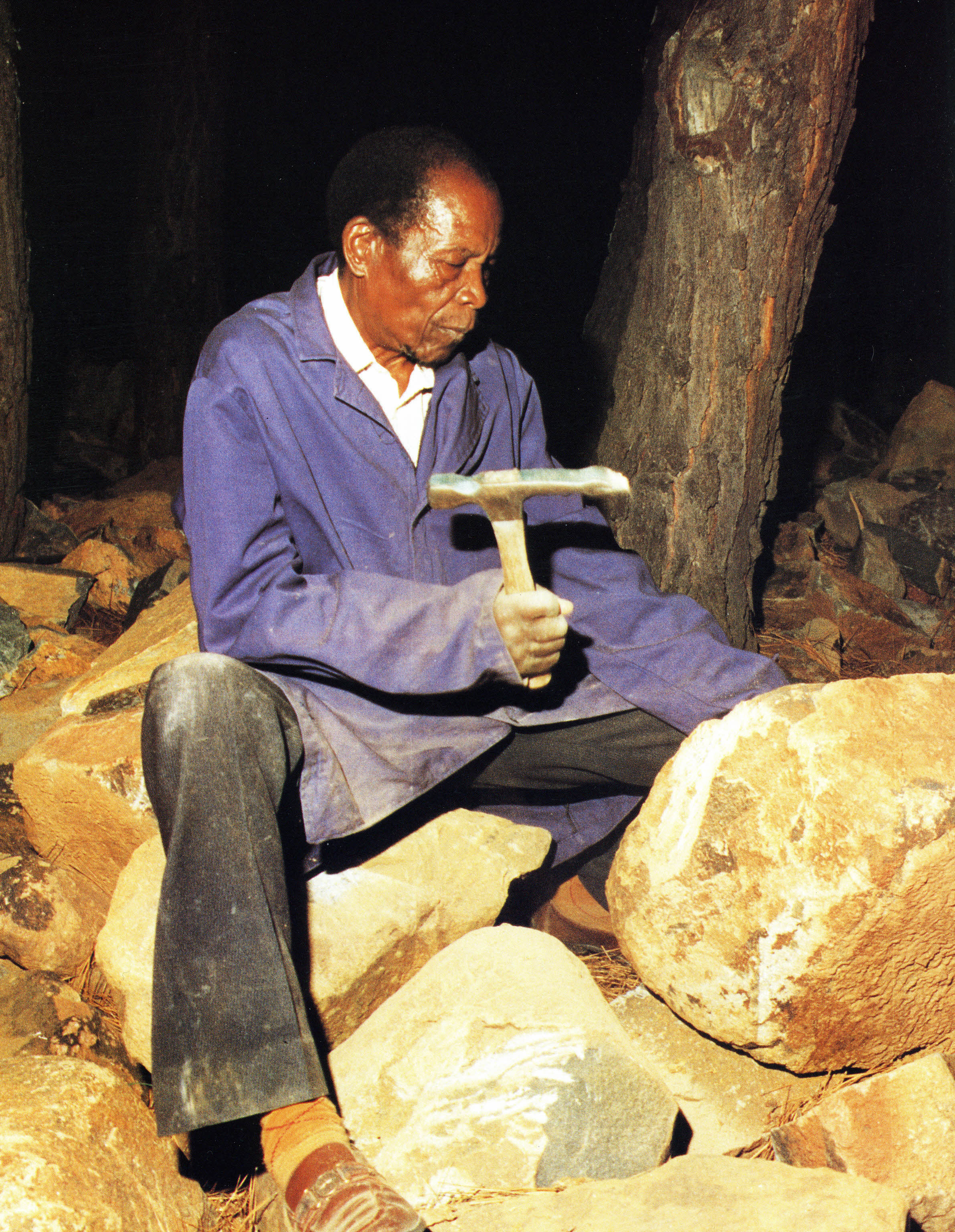
- Born: Henry Munyaradzi; 1931; Chipuriro, Zimbabwe
- Died: February 27, 1998 (aged 66–67)
- Education: Informal
- Known for: Sculpture
- Movement: Shona sculpture
- Awards: Winner, Nedlaw Sculpture Exhibition

Henry Munyaradzi, also known as Henry Munyaradzi Mudzengerere, (1931 – 27 February 1998) was a Zimbabwean sculptor. The sculptural movement of which he was part is usually referred to as "Shona sculpture" (see Shona art and Art of Zimbabwe), although some of its recognised members are not ethnically Shona. He worked initially at the Tengenenge Sculpture Community, 150 km north of Harare near Guruve, which he joined in 1967. In that Community, and ultimately in the wider world of lovers of Zimbabwean art, he was known simply as 'Henry'.

Henry Munyaradzi died in February 1998 and is buried in the Mukaera Christian village on the outskirts of Guruve.

== Early life and education ==
Munyaradzi was the son of a mhondoro, one of the traditional spiritual leaders of his community in Chipuriro (Sipolilo Tribal Trust land) about 30 km from Guruve, Mashonaland in the far north of what was, in 1931, Southern Rhodesia. He participated as a child in the traditional ceremonies such as the bira, a type of funeral procession, and in hunting. A Shona speaker, Munyaradzi never attended school, and struggled with the English language throughout his life. Henry was brought up by his uncle, Edward Chiwawa, who was a local carpenter; his education was practical and first-hand. He was influenced by a local itinerant Christian preacher, Mukaera, whose Apostolic Church he joined and he learned to read the Bible in Shona. Eventually he became the village blacksmith, and also worked as a carpenter and tobacco grader.

== Establishment as a sculptor ==
Munyaradzi had married and was seeking employment when on 10 September 1967 he was introduced to the Tengenenge Sculpture Community by Tom Blomefield, a white South-African-born farmer of tobacco whose farm had extensive deposits of serpentine stone suitable for carving. By Blomefield's account, he suggested Munyaradzi work alone rather than be influenced by the other sculptors such as Leman Moses who had already joined the community. Given his knowledge of woodwork and metal forging, Munyaradzi quickly learned the skills of a sculptor in stone, remaining largely self-taught for his entire career. His early work The Insect God was purchased by Henry McFadden and later exhibited in the Musée Rodin for many years. Munyaradzi left the Community to work on his own in 1975. He also taught other sculptors, for example his cousin Edward Chiwawa, and first exhibited his work at the Rhodes National Gallery in 1968. At that time, the sculptures had to be transported the 150 km to Salisbury, where it was appraised by Jenny Senior, the Exhibitions Officer for the sales gallery and who also helped organise the annual art exhibitions. According to Blomefield, when Henry was asked how he made such perfect shapes in his sculpture, he replied "I follow the shape of the stone. If the stone is standing there, I can see the different points which are important and I make it out of my instinct; there's a harmonious relationship between myself and the stone".

1969 was an important year for the new sculpture movement, because it was the time when McEwen took a group of works, mainly from Tengenenge, to the Museum of Modern Art in New York and elsewhere in the US, to critical acclaim. It was also the year that his wife Mary (née McFadden) established Vukutu, a sculptural farm near Inyanga, where many artists later worked. The list of names of sculptors who would become internationally well-known grew to include Bernard Matemera, Sylvester Mubayi, Henry Mukarobgwa, Thomas Mukarobgwa, Joseph Ndandarika and Bernard Takawira. All the sculptors mentioned so far, including Munyaradzi, contributed work to an exhibition called Arte de Vukutu shown in 1971 at the Musée National d'Art Moderne and in 1972 at the Musée Rodin. These were arranged by McEwen, who had lived and worked in Paris prior to his appointment in Harare.

== Later life and exhibitions ==
Munyaradzi and his wife had seven daughters and two sons. One son, Mekias (Mike), who attended Manchester University and became a commercial pilot, followed in his father's footsteps as a sculptor.

Henry soon gained worldwide recognition, with eight one-man shows at venues such as Los Angeles, Berlin and Heidelberg. Following one of these, a 1984 exhibition at the Commonwealth Institute in London, he purchased a farm in Ruwa, Zimbabwe where he lived and worked until his death.

One of Henry's works, called Wing Woman, was depicted on a Zimbabwean stamp issued to commemorate Commonwealth Day on 14 March 1983. It formed the 9c value in a set completed with works by Joseph Ndandarika, John Takawira and Nicholas Mukomberanwa. The stamp carries the name “Henry Mudzengerere”. Another, called Spirit Python was the 30c value in a set issued on 14 April 1988 to celebrate the 30th Anniversary of the opening of the National Gallery.

Munyaradzi derived his subject matter from the natural world, combining it with Christian imagery and depicting it in an unusual, deeply personal fashion. Celia Winter-Irving, in her book on Stone Sculpture (see Further Reading) wrote “Like Paul Klee, Henry takes a line for a walk but he reins it in after the first steps”. The evolution of his style and its connection to European sculpture is discussed by Jonathan Zilberg.

Munyaradzi's sculptures are in the permanent collections of the National Gallery of Zimbabwe, the Chapungu Sculpture Park, the Museum fur Völkerkunde, Frankfurt, the Indianapolis Museum of Art, the McEwen collection of the British Museum, and many others. Most include human or animal faces in which the eyes are carved as simple circles and the eyebrows and nose are cut with straight lines in a T shape. Some of his exhibition pieces, such as Saviour and Child (1989), have toured worldwide; for example to the Yorkshire Sculpture Park in 1990, where the works on display included examples from all the artists who had contributed to the 1971 Musée Rodin exhibition.

The catalogue “Chapungu: Culture and Legend – A Culture in Stone” for the exhibition at Kew Gardens in 2000 depicts Henry's sculptures Mhondoro – Great Lion Spirit (Springstone, 1986) on p. 48-59 and The Spirit Medium and the Interpreter (Springstone, 1995) on p. 84-85. Images of Munyaradzi's work are easily found on the World Wide Web, for example from the Richard Handelsman's collection where Prayer for the rain (203 cm high) is typical.

Some of Munyaradzi's early sculptures were signed by him with the name "Enri", for example for the exhibition Arte de Vukutu, but most had the name "HENRY" chiselled in capital letters and many have commanded relatively high prices on the international market. For that reason, forgeries are known to exist. He used several types of serpentine (e.g. springstone, green and red serpentine) and the rarer semi-precious stone verdite for his sculptures. As remarked by Olivier Sultan

"Known simply as 'Henry', the most widely known Zimbabwean sculptor is like a magician, a sage who knows how to find the essential and is, therefore, able to translate the essence of any being or spirit into stone. With care and tenderness, he selects the stone which he feels contains the spirit of an animal, a man, the moon or even the wind. He then relentlessly works to free the spirit, immortalizing it on the face of stele with an hypnotic gaze."

=== Selected solo or group exhibitions ===
- 1968 New African Art: The Central African Workshop School, New York, USA
- 1971 Sculpture Contemporaine des Shonas d’Afrique, Musée Rodin, Paris, France
- 1978 MOMA, New York, USA
- 1982 Janet Fleischer Gallery, Philadelphia, USA
- 1984 Henry of Tengenenge, Commonwealth Institute, London
- 1985 Kustchatze aus Africa, Frankfurt, Germany
- 1985 Henry of Tengenenge, Feingarten Gallery, Los Angeles, USA
- 1989 Zimbabwe op de Berg, Foundation Beelden op de Berg, Wageningen, The Netherlands
- 1990 Contemporary Stone Carving from Zimbabwe, Yorkshire Sculpture Park, UK
- 1994 Henry of Tengenenge, Contemporary Fine Art Gallery Eton, Berkshire, UK
- 2000 Chapungu: Custom and Legend – A Culture in Stone, Kew Gardens, UK

== See also ==
- Sculpture of Zimbabwe
