= Celia Winter-Irving =

Australian-born Zimbabwean-based artist and art critic

- Born: 1941
- Died: 26 July 2009 (aged 67–68)
- Occupation: Writer
- Spouse: Philip Thompson

Celia Winter-Irving (1941–26 July 2009), was an Australian-born, Zimbabwean-based artist and art critic who wrote extensively on Zimbabwean art, especially Shona sculpture, when she lived in Harare from 1987 to 2008 .

== Early life ==
Celia Winter-Irving was born in Melbourne, the only child of William and Audrey Winter-Irving, and grew up at their farm near Echuca, called Gundamian. She was a granddaughter of Sir Samuel Hordern, who was the director of the family company Anthony Hordern & Sons and Charlotte Hordern (née See, the daughter of Sir John See). Winter-Irving studied fine arts, especially sculpture, and became director of public relations for the John Power Foundation for Fine Arts at the University of Sydney.

As a sculptor using metal, she won the Wyong Sculpture Prize, but in later life she mainly painted. In 1981 she married Philip Thompson, a widower. They opened the Irving Sculpture Gallery in Glebe, New South Wales, the first gallery in Australia dedicated solely to sculpture. Winter-Irving wrote about sculpture and art for magazines such as Craft International, Art Network, and Arts Queensland. Philip Thompson died in 1985, following which she continued as director of the Gallery and organised successful exhibitions, particularly those that introduced the Sydney public to Shona stone sculpture.

Works were brought to Australia by Roy Guthrie, the founder of the Chapungu Sculpture Park, and he introduced Celia to Tom Blomefield, a white farmer at Tengenenge in the north of Zimbabwe who had created an artists' community of sculptors there. When in 1986 the British art journal Studio International commissioned an article on Shona sculpture, Winter-Irving visited Zimbabwe to do research and stayed at the Tengenenge Sculpture Community. She was so impressed with what she saw that she moved to live permanently in Harare and decided to write a book about the sculpture of Zimbabwe.

== Later years ==
Winter-Irving lived in Zimbabwe from 1987 to 2008. She was employed by the Chapungu Sculpture Park, as a research fellow of the Southern African Political and Economic Series (SAPES) and most importantly by the National Gallery of Zimbabwe, where she was an Honorary Research Fellow (from 1998) and later curator from 2003 to 2007. In 2007, Winter-Irving was appointed researcher and writer at the National Arts Council of Zimbabwe, where she had helped develop the annual National Merit Awards for artists in the country. She had been a jurist for these awards on three occasions.

During this whole period, she wrote extensively: as a columnist writing on Zimbabwean art and culture for The Herald and Zimbabwe Mirror, Southern Times and Air Zimbabwe's inflight magazine Sky Host. She published an anthology of many of her articles in 2004 and achieved her ambition to write books about the sculptors and their works. She also promoted the international reputation of the leading artists by writing introductions to exhibition catalogues, giving television and radio interviews and seeking funding from private and government sponsors. In doing so, she became arguably the foremost authority in the art history of the Shona sculpture movement.

Winter-Irving maintained close contact with the Tengenenge Sculpture Community near Guruve, which she often visited and taught painting to the children of the sculptors who worked there. Her own specialism was abstract art, and she had one solo show at Sandros Gallery in Harare. She also wrote a children's book, Soottie the cat at Tengenenge, the story of a cat exploring the surrealist world of art and sculpture.

Winter-Irving had the instincts of a journalist for pithy and insightful comments, combined with the dedication and patience to fully research what she wrote about. When interviewed at Chupungu in 2002, for example, she said:

The sculptor in Zimbabwe is not somebody who sits in a studio with a grant from his government or her government, making nice little excursions into the post-modern. The Zimbabwean sculptor today is often a man or a woman sculpting in their back yard in Chitungwiza, where the man next door is beating his wife and the child next door is being molested by her uncle, you know. So the artist today in Zimbabwe is in the thick of what is happening.

When ill health forced Winter-Irving to return to Sydney for treatment, she still managed to deliver a final lecture on Shona sculpture at the College of Fine Arts at the University of New South Wales on 23 April 2009, just a few months before her death from cancer. Following her wishes, her ashes were then returned to Zimbabwe and scattered over Tengenenge.

=== Major publications ===
- (1991) Stone Sculpture in Zimbabwe: Context, Content & Form, Roblaw Publishers, Harare, ISBN 0-908309-14-7 (Paperback) ISBN 0-908309-11-2 (Clothbound)
- (1996) Aufbruch: Moderne Afrikanische Kunst, die Sammlung Kleine-Gunk, Solaris
- (1997) Contemporary Stone Sculpture in Zimbabwe, Craftsman House ISBN 978-976-8097-37-8
- (2000) Lazarus Takawira (A biography)
- (2000) Anderson Mukomberanwa (A biography)
- (2001) Tengenenge Art Sculpture and Paintings, World Art Foundation, Eerbeek, The Netherlands, ISBN 90-806237-2-5
- (2001) Soottie the cat at Tengenenge, Tengenenge (Pvt) Ltd, Graniteside, Harare ISBN 0-7974-2260-9
- (2002) We Have Something to Say: Children in Zimbabwe Speak Out, Children's Consortium Zimbabwe, ISBN 0-7974-2402-4
- (2002) Agnes Nyanhongo, Sculptor, Chapungu Sculpture Park, ISBN 0-7974-2422-9
- (2003) New Visions in Stone (commissioned by art promoters Tim & Dawn Anderson with Glenn Sullivan), Harare
- (2004) Pieces of Time: An anthology of articles on Zimbabwe’s stone sculpture published in The Herald and Zimbabwe Mirror 1999–2000, Mambo Press, Zimbabwe, ISBN 0-86922-781-5
- (2004) Phillip Kotokwa: My Life in Stone Sculpture in Zimbabwe and Beyond (jointly authored with Phillip Kotokwa and published privately), ISBN 0-7974-2805-4
- (2004) Mike (Mekias) Munyaradzi: the stone's apprentice: Zimbabwean master sculptor, Friends Forever (Pvt), ISBN 0-7974-2867-4
- (2005) Paixao Africa (African Passion): Contemporary Zimbabwean Sculpture, Monte Palace Tropical Museum, Madeira.
- (2006) Following the Footsteps of Wisdom: The Sculpture of Merchers Chiwawa, Bastian Muller, Witten, Germany
- (2007) Contemporary Zimbabwean sculpture, Národní galerie, ISBN 80-7035-360-0
- (2009) Spirit of a woman—a journey through the sculpture of Lazarus Takawira, (privately published by Dr Marie Imbrova)
