= Gerald Takawira =

Zimbabwean sculptor

- Born: Gerald; 1964; Nyanga
- Died: October 2004 (aged 39–40)
- Citizenship: Zimbabwe
- Occupation: Sculptor

Gerald Takawira (1964 – October 2004) was a Zimbabwean sculptor.

Born in Nyanga, Takawira was the son of sculptor John Takawira, and had two brothers and a sister. He attended the local primary school before completing his education in Chiweshe in 1984. From the time he was 13, Takawira would assist his father in sandpapering his sculptures; the two men worked together until John's death in 1989. From then until 1998 Gerald and his brother worked together at their farm in the south of Harare. In 1998 he became an artist in residence at the Chapungu Sculpture Park.

Takawira died in 2004.
