= Guruve District =

- District
- Interactive map of Guruve District
- Coordinates: 16°20′0″S 30°35′0″E
- Country: Zimbabwe
- Province: Mashonaland Central
- District: Guruve

Area
  - Total: 2,994 km^{2} (1,156 sq mi)
- Elevation: 446 m (1,463 ft)

Population (2022 census)
  - Total: 153,606
  - Density: 51.30/km^{2} (132.9/sq mi)
- Time zone: UTC+1 (CET)
  - Summer (DST): UTC+1 (CEST)

Guruve is one of several districts in the Mashonaland Central province of Zimbabwe. The district capital is the town of Guruve. It has 2 districts which are Upper Guruve Rural District and the Lower Guruve Rural District which is locally known referred to as Mbire District. Mbire District can be traced back to the Munhumutapa Dynasty. Guruve is demarcated into 2 constituencies which are Guruve-North Constituency and Guruve-South Constituency.
