= Norbert Shamuyarira =

Zimbabwean sculptor

- Born: Norbert; 1962 (age 63–64); Chinhoyi
- Citizenship: Zimbabwe
- Occupation: Sculptor
- Years active: 1979

Norbert Shamuyarira (born 1962) is a Zimbabwean sculptor.

A native of Chinhoyi, Shamuyarira lost his mother at the age of nine; soon after her death, his father deserted the family. His brother later committed suicide. He started sculpting in 1979, working for four years with Bernard Takawira in Chitungwiza.
