= Barankinya Gosta =

Zimbabwean sculptor

- Born: 1935; Mozambique
- Died: 1998 (aged 62–63)
- Citizenship: Zimbabwe
- Occupation: Sculptor

Barankinya Gosta (1935–1998) was a prominent Zimbabwean Chewa sculptor.

A native of Mozambique, Barankinya Gosta was a resident of Zimbabwe's renowned Tengenenge Sculpture Community. He worked primarily in wood, which he painted; his style was derived from that used in traditional Chewa masks.

Barankinya Gosta's work is in the collection of the Chapungu Sculpture Park.
