= John Takawira =

Zimbabwean sculptor

- Born: John Takawira; 1938; Chegutu, Zimbabwe
- Died: 8 November 1989; Harare
- Education: Workshop School, National Gallery of Zimbabwe
- Known for: Sculpture
- Movement: Shona sculpture
- Awards: 1st prize, Nedlaw Sculpture Exhibition 1981

John Takawira (1938–8 November 1989), was a Zimbabwean sculptor. The background to the sculptural movement of which he was a leading member is given in the article on Shona art.

== Early life and education ==
Takawira was born in Chegutu, the son of a policeman, but grew up in Nyanga where he was educated at the Mount Mellersay Mission School. He was deeply influenced by his mother, Mai, who had an imposing personality and a talent for story-telling based on her knowledge of Shona myths. She was also a potter. Bernard and Lazarus (es), his younger brothers, became sculptors and John retained many elements of his traditional upbringing throughout his life.

At the age of twenty, Takawira was introduced to sculpture by his uncle, the sculptor Joram Mariga. Almost immediately he was noticed by Frank McEwen, the founding director of the new Rhodes National Gallery who invited him to become among the first members of the Workshop School at what is now the National Gallery of Zimbabwe; from 1963 his work was exhibited there. In 1969, McEwen's wife Mary (née McFadden) established Vukutu, a sculptural farm near Inyanga; when the School moved there Takawira followed, becoming one of its most important figures from 1969 until its closure in 1976. In this period pre-independence, the white Rhodesian government saw the Vukutu artists as a politically motivated group and John was at one time arrested for carrying stones, which was seen as a provocation.

John Takawira contributed his sculpture Skeletal Baboon to an exhibition called Arte de Vukutu shown in 1971 at the Musée National d'Art Moderne and in 1972 at the Musée Rodin. These were arranged by McEwen, who had lived and worked in Paris prior to his appointment in Harare. The piece was an enormous success, being called by Charles Ratton the "finest art to emerge from Africa in the twentieth century". Almost immediately Takawira's international reputation was made and he became a full-time professional sculptor.

== Later life and exhibitions ==
Takawira developed the skeleton theme that had inspired Sylvester Mubayi, with whom he had worked at Vukutu, and it is a testament to his power as an artist that he was able through these works to express his own feelings about the Shona religion and its beliefs about contact with the spirit world. Some of the pieces from this time are Skeletal Man (1969), Owl Spirit (1977) and He Has Life: Human Skeleton with Baboon Skull, the latter now in the British Museum as part of the McEwen bequest.

One of John’s works, called Hornbill Man, was depicted on a Zimbabwean stamp issued to commemorate Commonwealth Day on 14 March 1983. It formed the 30c value in a set completed with works by Henry Munyaradzi, Joseph Ndandarika and Nicholas Mukomberanwa.

Takawira was among the first Zimbabwean sculptors to combine polished areas with rougher stone on the surface of his sculptures but he avoided coloured stones, preferring springstone (a type of hard black serpentine) which he is said to have named because his chisel sprang away from it owing to its extreme hardness. His subjects included references to traditional Shona sources including Mwari (God), but women were a particular favorite which he returned to throughout his life: they were often shown with elongated necks and flowing hair. More of his works are in the permanent collection of the National Gallery of Zimbabwe than those of any other artist.

In 1988, one of John's works called Chapungu (a bateleur eagle) was presented to Pope John Paul II.

The catalogue “Chapungu: Culture and Legend – A Culture in Stone” for the exhibition at Kew Gardens in 2000 depicts John’s sculptures United Family (Springstone, 1987) on p. 24-25 and Rural Mother (Springstone, 1986) on p. 60-61. Both show elements of John's characteristic hollowed-out style that can be considered an extension of his early skeleton figures.

Takawira died suddenly in November 1989. His son Gerald Takawira also became a sculptor.

=== Selected solo and group exhibitions ===
- 1965 New Art from Rhodesia, Commonwealth Arts Festival, Royal Festival Hall, London
- 1971 Sculpture Contemporaine des Shonas d’Afrique, Musée Rodin, Paris, France
- 1972 Shona sculptures of Rhodesia, ICA Gallery, London
- 1976 John Takawira, Standard Bank Gallery, Harare
- 1983 The sculpture of John Takawira, PG Gallery, National Gallery of Zimbabwe
- 1985 Big John Takawira, The Gallery Shona Sculpture, Harare
- 1985 John Takawira, Feingarten Gallery, Los Angeles
- 1989 Zimbabwe op de Berg, Foundation Beelden op de Berg, Wageningen, The Netherlands
- 1989 Zimbabwe Heritage Exhibition, Auckland, New Zealand (toured for 9 months)
- 1990 Contemporary Stone Carving from Zimbabwe, Yorkshire Sculpture Park, UK
- 1994 Moderne Afrikanische Kunst, Palmengarten, Frankfurt am Main, Germany
- 1997 Zimbabwe Stone Sculpture, Kirstenbosch National Botanical Garden, Cape Town
- 2000 Chapungu: Custom and Legend – A Culture in Stone, Kew Gardens, UK
- 2010 Embracing the Spirit, Phyllis Court, Henley on Thames, UK
