= Kingsley Sambo =

Rhodesian painter and cartoonist

Kingsley Sambo (1936–1977) was a Rhodesian painter and cartoonist.

== Biography ==
Sambo was born in Rusape, where he lived until attending Cyrene Mission boarding school in the 1940s (his work in the exhibition The Stars Are Bright is dated 1945). He received art training there under Sam Songo and Canon Edward (Ned) Paterson. Later, he went to art school in Malawi. In 1959, he returned to Cyrene, where he taught art for a year. In 1960 he quit that job to become the cartoonist for the Daily News in Salisbury, which had a primarily African readership. Once in Salisbury he joined Frank McEwen's Workshop School, where he received further painting training. From early on in Salisbury he exhibited in annual competitions and other exhibitions organized by McEwen. Eschewing his mission background, he worked in oils and preferred to depict township scenes. As a jazz guitarist who played regularly in township shebeens, he often depicted the emerging urban party scene. These paintings moved away from straight realism, and their use of line and color was compared to Oskar Kokoschka. His job as Daily News cartoonist lasted for four years until the newspaper was banned.

In 1965 the former Cyrene headmaster, Ned Paterson, hired Sambo as an art instructor at Nyarutsetso school in Salisbury. Unfortunately, the marriage between the old-fashioned missionary and the fast-living Sambo proved short-lived. Sambo, hanging out at Job Kekana's art school in Rusape, began painting male and female nudes using the live models that were hired there. Paterson, scandalized, fired Sambo, who never had a full-time job again.

From the late 1960s on, Sambo worked out of his father's store in Rusape. After gaining a reputation with a series of risque murals painted at various drinking establishments in the Salisbury area, a stream of White buyers flocked to his father's store to buy his works. Due to suspicions caused by the ongoing Chimurenga liberation conflict, Sambo was suspected of being a sell-out. Eventually, his sports car was sabotaged in 1977 by ZANU members, leading to his untimely death.

Sambo's paintings are in the collections of the National Gallery of Zimbabwe, the exhibition The Stars Are Bright and in many private collections. Two are in the MoMA.
