= Zimbabwean art =

Zimbabwean art includes decorative esthetics applied to many aspects of life, including art objects as such, utilitarian objects, objects used in religion, warfare, in propaganda, and in many other spheres. Within this broad arena, Zimbabwe has several identifiable categories of art. It is a hallmark of African cultures in general that art touches many aspects of life, and most tribes have a vigorous and often recognisable canon of styles and a great range of art-worked objects. These can include masks, drums, textile decoration, beadwork, carving, sculpture, ceramic in various forms, housing and the person themselves. Decoration of the body in permanent ways such as scarification or tattoo or impermanently as in painting the body for a ceremony is a common feature of African cultures.

Spoken or musical art is also a prominent part of Africas generally. Various instruments including drums, lamellophones and stringed bows have been used in Zimbabwe, while oratory, poetry, fable telling, praise singing and tribal ritual chants are also prominent.

In recent decades Zimbabwe has become widely recognized internationally for its sculpture.

== History ==
There is an artistic tradition in Zimbabwe that can be traced back to pottery of the Early and Late Stone Age and rock paintings from the Late Stone Age. Many rock paintings produced by San artists between 10000 and 2000 years ago are found in cultural sites in Zimbabwe and these demonstrate a high degree of skill in drawing. Many depict recognisable animal figures and use shading and colour to enhance the visual impact. The archaeology of Zimbabwe includes numerous pottery finds, which assist in the reconstruction of linguistic and cultural groupings within what is here termed Shona. The pottery indicates that the people of the Late Iron Age were settled agriculturists and they have been categorised as forming groups such as the Harare culture and the Leopard's Kopje culture: the latter established in 980 AD in a site called K2. This group moved to Mapungubwe where they used stone walls to separate the ruling class from the rest of the population. This settlement was abandoned in the thirteenth century at around the time that a now much better-known site was developed by others who lived on the Zimbabwean plateau. This was Great Zimbabwe, which dates from about 1250–1500 AD. It is a stone-walled town (Zimbabwe means "royal residence") and shows evidence in its archaeology of skilled stone working: the walls were made of a local granite and no mortar was used in their construction. When excavated, six soapstone birds and a soapstone bowl were found in the eastern enclosure of the monument, so these Shona-speaking Gumanye people certainly produced sculpture. Each object was carved from a single piece of stone and the birds have an aesthetic quality that places them as genuine "art". In comparing them to other better-known African stone sculpture, for example from the Yoruba culture, Philip Allison, writing in 1968, stated "The stone sculptures of Rhodesia are few in number and of no great aesthetic distinction, but Zimbabwe itself has a place of peculiar importance in the study of African cultures".

=== Stone Age ===
In prehistory the area was widely settled by Kung peoples, the so-called Khoikhoi or San, Hottentot or Bushmen people, who were hunter gatherers. They often lived in caves and made various artworks, including beading from shells for personal decoration, incising designs on ostrich shells and utilitarian objects such as clay water straws and also on the cave walls themselves. These dynamic and varied cave paintings date from around 10000 BCE and depict humans hunting many kinds of animals, warfare between humans, mystical and other unidentified marks, landscape and ceremonies where the humans are obviously decorated or in costume. The colours vary from black through brown, red, ochre, yellow and white. The pigments used are unknown, though presumably contain a mix of local materials such as earth oxides, fat, vegetable juices and possibly fluids from larval insects. Certainly they have lasted for thousands of years.

Their descendants, who live mainly in Botswana and Namibia, sing a variety of uniquely structured and tuneful songs, accompanied sometimes by a plucked or struck bow. They also have a repertoire of dances, and there is no reason to suspect their ancestors did not do the same thing.

=== Iron Age ===
These Stone Age people were supplanted by Iron Age Nguni-derived pastoral and farming peoples migrating in from the east and north around 2000 years ago, who became the ancestors of the WaRozwi/Barotse people and by derivation the Amashona peoples. The art of these people can be seen in many decorated first-fired clay pots, where typically a repeated dhol-dhol (linear herringbone) motif or similar edging was applied. Other artwork is harder to source, though it can be assumed they decorated the body and had beadwork and other art styles related to typical styles of the East and Central African Nguni peoples. A recurrent motif in Shona art is the transformation of a human into an animal of some.

=== Later prehistory ===
At around the same time as the earlier incursions of these Bantu-type people (200BCE) there were sporadic expeditions by South-East coastal dwellers, probably by the Save River or over mountain passes in the Eastern Highlands, into the Zimbabwe area to obtain gold for trade with Arab traders trading as far south as the mouth of the Savi. They built stone forts extending into the interior at one day's march from each other, with the final one being the complex now known as Great Zimbabwe. To service the coastal trade a town called Sofala was established at the mouth of the Sofala river on the east coast. It had its heyday in around 700 AD/CE and served the Mwenemutapa/Monomotapa Kingdom, whose capital was Great Zimbabwe. Arabs took up residence in Sofala around 900AD/CE

=== Early sculpture ===
Archaeology at Zimbabwe has shown several distinct phases of building and styles of stonework. It is likely the original complex was rather functional - essentially a fort and trading post only, and the later and more elaborate building occurred when the complex became the central administrative and royal centre of activity for the area. Some of the architectural features are probably linked with styles of coastal Swahili architecture and some are uniquely local. Chinese pottery shards, ivory, glass objects, local gold objects, Arabic and local beads, copper ingots, iron ingots and other trade items have been found at Zimbabwe. The herringbone and other stepped linear forms of decoration in the walls are a feature of the most recent stonework. Similar stonework is seen at Khami ruins, a fort built on the way to Zimbabwe. However, the most impressive and unique feature of Zimbabwe are the huge soapstone birds, the so-called Zimbabwe birds, depicting a bird of prey perched on a zig-zag base motif. These birds are possibly based on the bateleur eagle or maybe a vulture species and might have had something to do with a religious cult or indicative of a totem animal for the ruling people at the time. Most of these sculptures are still in the country but one is in South Africa where it still adorns Groote Schuur an official residence, once the home of Cecil Rhodes. Another unexplained motif at Zimbabwe, which like the birds were mounted on the perimeter wall of the Great Enclosure, were stelae or tall narrow rectilinear pillars of rock (probably natural fracture artefacts) set at intervals round the top of the wall. The Zimbabwe bird is the most prominent motif of the current Zimbabwe flag.

=== Amandebele incursions ===
The origin of Amandebele speaking peoples in southern Zimbabwe received its main impetus from settlement around 1840 under Mzilikazi, a Khumalo chief who rebelled against Zulu rule. However, it is likely that such tribes began crossing the Limpopo sporadically from about 1800 onwards. Amandebele conflict with the Amashona drove them northwards into what was dubbed in colonial times Mashonaland. These Amandebele/Matabele peoples had several distinct art forms differing from the Amashona: in pottery styles, bead aprons and headpieces, house decoration, carving and decoration of war implements such as clubs / knobkerries and shields.

=== 19th and early 20th century ===
Art in Zimbabwe lost most of its spiritual power with the conversion of the majority of the population to Christianity in the 19th and 20th centuries. Missionaries harmed the local cultures by demanding destruction of anything they regarded as anti-Christian, in particular masks or carvings thought to have votive powers, that is, to be appealing to some god that was not the Christian one. By the second world war most art objects produced in Zimbabwe were simply that: produced for tourist and local white settler consumption. With the advent of guns, animal skins prepared and decorated with small panels of other hides also began to appear more frequently in the early 20th century, as well as 'karosses' or fur blankets influenced by BaTchwana styles from Botswana to the south.

As for travelers to the area during the Victorian period, they used art, especially painting, to depict some of what they saw there. This art of the colonial period took landscape as its main theme and many of the European artists were present as part of expeditions that aimed to inform the public in Europe about life in Africa. For example, Thomas Baines joined the Zambezi expedition led by David Livingstone in 1858 and in 1861 he was one of the first to make oil paintings of Victoria Falls. John Guille Millais spent six months of 1893 sketching and hunting in Zimbabwe.

In the 1940s a Zimbabwe philanthropist named Jairos Jiri began to teach disabled people various artistic skills and centralised their production for sale in several outlets nationwide. These proved very popular and returned money to persons otherwise excluded from normal commercial activity. Jairos Jiri centres remain an important part of the artistic output in Zimbabwe. Typical items include tiles, tiled tables and wall plaques, basketwork, beading, carvings in wood and stone, jewellery and paintings.

=== Prelude to independence ===
In the mid-1970s the nationalist guerilla incursions resulted in several atrocities against people in rural villages, including the sawing off of the upper lip of those perceived as collaborating with the government forces. The white government collated photographic images and a text list of these events into a propaganda booklet called 'Anatomy of Terror'. This was designed to show the brutality of the nationalists against innocent rural native people. Images from this publication are today to be found on YouTube (for example under 'Terrorists in the Rhodesian bush').

Other art from the white minority during the civil "Rhodesian Bush" (1968 - 1979) war consisted mainly of depictions of indigenous fauna and flora and landscapes. These subjects had always been popular and remain popular to this day among white artists. No individual white artist expressed any significant political sentiment during the civil war era. However, many film, still and sound clips celebrating the government forces' role during this time are currently available on YouTube.

=== Painting in the 20th and 21st centuries ===
While there were many well-known white artists in Rhodesia prior to independence in 1980, there were relatively few black artists of note. One of these was Kingsley Sambo (1932–1977), who started to paint at the Cyrene Mission where Canon Edward Paterson taught art. Two of Sambo's paintings are in the MoMA. Other artists, who were also leading sculptors, were Thomas Mukarobgwa and Joseph Ndandarika who had studied with John Groeber at the Serima Mission Church.

Although the Workshop School of the National Gallery supported and encouraged painters from 1957, Rhodesia had few Colleges for Fine Arts. The Bulawayo College of Fine Art and Design trained artists in fine art and graphic design for Rhodesian industry and it was not until 1963 that Alex Lambert set up the Mzilikazi Art School in Bulawayo specifically to encourage local people to take up art.

The National Gallery has, since 1986, promoted local artists by hosting an annual exhibition of contemporary visual arts called "Zimbabwe Heritage". Patronage from Zimbabwean companies – the Baringa Corporation (for paintings, graphics, textiles, ceramics and photograph) and the Nedlaw Investment and Trust Corporation (for sculpture) – initially supported the expense of having an international panel of judges come to Zimbabwe to assess the works and make Awards. Later, the sponsorship of the event grew to include international companies such as Mobil, Lever Brothers, The BOC Group and Longman. Early winners of Awards of Distinction in the painters and graphics category included Berry Bickle (1987), Bert Hemsteede (1988), Rashid Jogee (1992) and Tichaona Madzamba (1992).

Painters who have established reputations in post-independence Zimbabwe include Dumisani Ngwenya, Taylor Nkomo and Richard Jack.

In 2018, the Zeitz Museum of Contemporary Art Africa held an exhibition by 29 Zimbabwean artists examining painting as commentary to the sociopolitical. The exhibition statement says: "Painting has a long history in Zimbabwe... For decades, artists from Zimbabwe have manipulated this medium as a way of subtly articulating complex issues, speaking in intricate, allegorical codes."

=== Sculpture in the 20th and 21st centuries ===
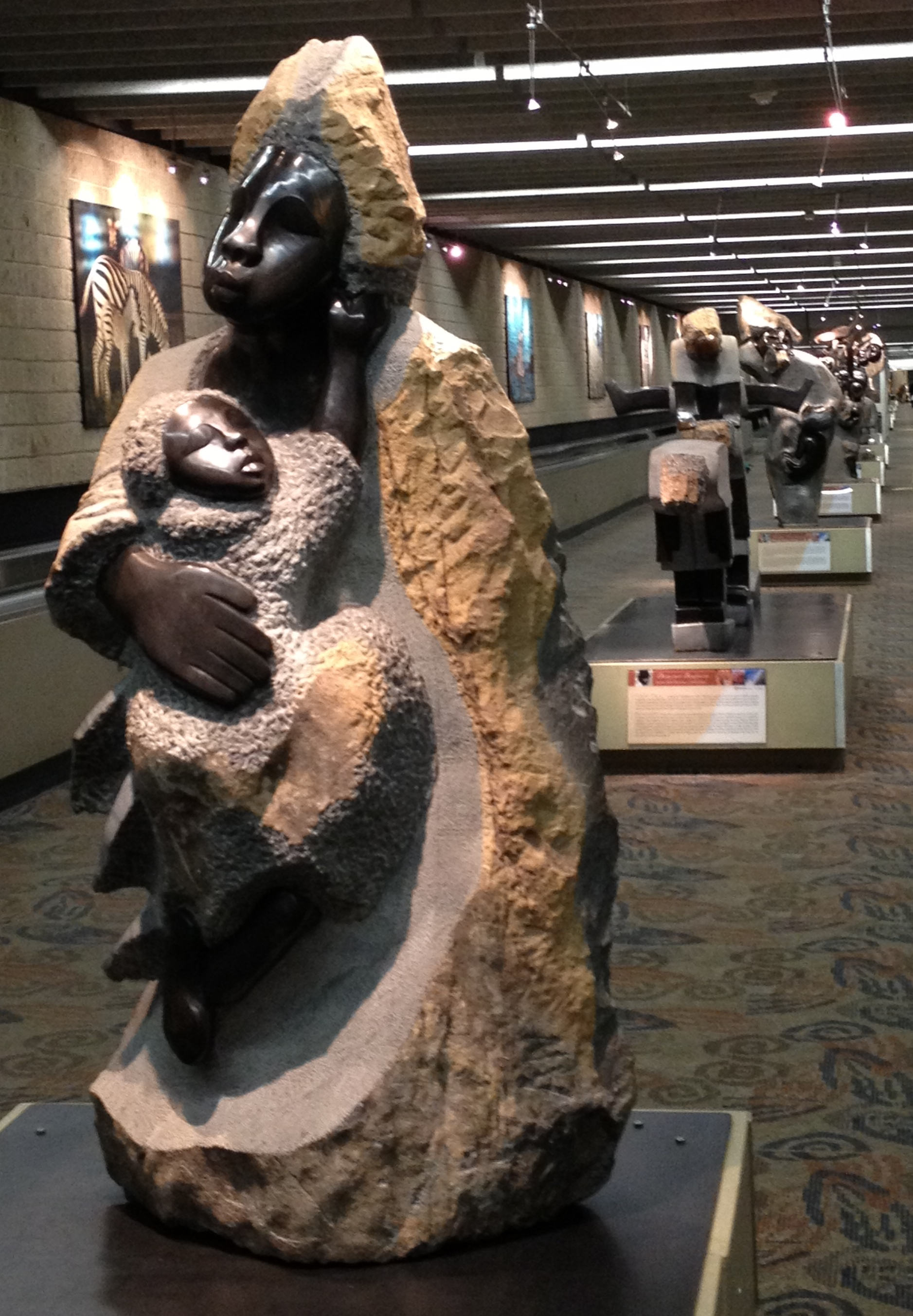
Zimbabwe Sculpture: a Tradition in Stone, Atlanta, United States, at Hartsfield-Jackson Atlanta International Airport between concourses T and A

Since antiquity local artists have been using the steatite/soapstone deposits of the eastern Zimbabwe mountain ranges to produce artworks showing, among other things, the common Shona theme of animal/human inter-morphosis. These works became much larger under the patronage of white collectors in the 1960s (though the Zimbabwe birds of antiquity are massive) and now it is common to see monumental sculptures in hard Serpentine stone both nationally and internationally.

Chapungu Sculpture Park in Harare is currently an important locality for display of (mainly) Shona sculptors and carvers. Another Chapungu Sculpture Park was created in 2007 in the United States, along with a gallery, in Loveland, Colorado. Zimbabwe Sculpture: a Tradition in Stone is on permanent display at Atlanta's airport.

Noted contemporary artists include sculptors Dominic Benhura and Tapfuma Gutsa, and painters Kingsley Sambo and Owen Maseko.

Villa Mangiacane in Tuscany hosts one of the largest modern collections of Shona Art sculptures in Europe with over 220 pieces on display across its grounds. AVAC Arts now supports the adaptation and utilization of new technologies in sculpture and runs an online portal facilitating its international trade.

== See also ==
- List of Zimbabwean artists
