= Bernard Takawira =

Zimbabwean sculptor

- Born: Bernard; 1948; Nyanga
- Died: 1997 (aged 48–49)
- Citizenship: Zimbabwe
- Occupation: Sculptor
- Relatives: John Takawira Lazarus Takawira

Bernard Takawira (1948–1997) was a Zimbabwean sculptor, the younger brother of John Takawira and older brother of Lazarus Takawira.

Takawira was born in the mountainous Nyanga district, third of six children. Their father was often absent for work, and their mother, Mai, assumed a dominant role. She was well known for her knowledge of Shona myths and stories, and would share them with her sons; these tales had a deep influence in both John and Bernard's careers as sculptors.

Bernard trained as an agricultural advisor to the government after leaving school, but was encouraged by John to try carving stone. John introduced him to Frank McEwen, who was running a workshop in Vukutu at the time. Takawira soon began spending all of his free time at the workshop, where he learned much; in 1977 he left his governmental position to begin sculpting full-time.

Stylistically, Takawira's sculptures show evidence of a great interior struggle between Christianity and Shona culture, a battle which affected the artist for much of his life. Many of his works take as their subject abstract themes such as patience, humility, and integrity.

Takawira died in 1997.
