= Guruve =

City Guruve
- Village
- Guruve in Zimbabwe Map
- Coordinates: 16°39′S 30°42′E
- Country: Zimbabwe
- Province: Mashonaland Central

Population (2012 Census)
  - Total: 5,226
- Time zone: UTC+2 (CAT)
- Climate: Cwb

Guruve is a village and centre of Guruve District, Zimbabwe.
