= 2013 Zimbabwean constitutional referendum =

- 16–17 March 2013
- The Parliamentary Select Committee (COPAC) which was spearheading the Constitution making process prepared a draft Constitution that was tabled before Parliament on the 5th day of February 2013, and duly adopted by Parliament. The draft Constitution was published in the Gazette on the 15th day of February 2013. Are you in favour of adopting that draft Constitution as the new Constitution of Zimbabwe?
- Outcome: New constitution adopted and fully in force on 22 August 2013

Results
Choice	Votes	%
Yes	3,079,966	94.49%
No	179,489	5.51%
Valid votes	3,259,455	98.29%
Invalid or blank votes	56,627	1.71%
Total votes	3,316,082	100.00%
Yes	92.88%
No	5.41%
Invalid	1.71%
- Results by constituency

The 2013 Zimbabwean constitutional referendum was held on 16–17 March 2013, where Zimbabweans voted on a draft constitution that had been endorsed by all major political parties in the country. The outcome was a resounding yes vote, with 94.5 percent of voters supporting the new document. The referendum was a key milestone in Zimbabwe's political landscape, paving the way for the 2013 Zimbabwean general election and marking the end of the Lancaster House Constitution that had governed the country since independence in 1980. The new constitution introduced significant reforms, including term limits for the president, devolution of powers, enhanced gender equality provisions, and a strengthened bill of rights.

== Background ==
Zimbabwe's post-independence constitutional history has been marked by efforts to replace the Lancaster House Constitution, which was negotiated in 1979 as part of the transition from Rhodesia to Zimbabwe. This document was seen by many as a compromise that preserved colonial-era structures and limited land reform. The first major attempt at reform came in the 2000 Zimbabwean constitutional referendum, where a government-proposed draft was rejected by 54 percent of voters amid low turnout (26 percent) and opposition from civil society and the newly formed Movement for Democratic Change (MDC). This rejection was a significant blow to President Robert Mugabe's ZANU–PF party and contributed to a period of political and economic turmoil.

The impetus for the 2013 constitution arose from the violent and disputed 2008 Zimbabwean general election, which led to a power-sharing agreement known as the Global Political Agreement (GPA) brokered by the Southern African Development Community (SADC). The GPA, signed in September 2008 by ZANU–PF, MDC–T (led by Morgan Tsvangirai), and MDC–N (led by Welshman Ncube), established a Government of National Unity (GNU) and mandated a new constitution as a prerequisite for future elections. The GNU, intended to last two to three years, extended to nearly five due to delays in the constitutional process.

== Drafting process ==
The drafting was overseen by the Parliamentary Select Committee on the New Constitution (COPAC), a 25-member body co-chaired by representatives from the three GPA parties: Douglas Mwonzora (MDC–T), Edward Mkhosi (MDC–N), and Paul Mangwana (ZANU–PF). The process, expected to take 18 months, stretched to nearly four years from 2009 to 2013 due to inter-party disputes, funding issues, and logistical challenges. It included outreach meetings across the country, but these were marred by intimidation, violence, and ZANU–PF's efforts to influence discussions on key issues like presidential powers and devolution.

Funding was a major hurdle, with the United Nations Development Programme providing $21 million, about half the budget. Stalemates arose over devolution, citizenship, diaspora voting, and the electoral system, with ZANU–PF proposing up to 200 amendments. SADC mediation helped resolve these, and a final draft was agreed upon on 31 January 2013. Only 70,000 copies were distributed for over 5 million voters, with inadequate translations and limited access in remote areas.

Women's groups, such as the Group of 20 (G-20), played a crucial role in advocating for gender provisions, supported by UN Women and UNDP.

== Key provisions ==
The new constitution retained an executive presidency but introduced two five-year term limits (not retroactive, allowing Mugabe to run again). It granted the president powers to appoint ministers, ambassadors, and security chiefs, declare war, and appoint judges, with immunity during office.

The electoral system mixed first-past-the-post for the 210-seat National Assembly and proportional representation for the 80-seat Senate, with gender alternation on party lists. Devolution transferred powers to provincial and local councils for better governance and resource sharing.

Security services were required to be neutral and non-partisan. Land provisions limited compensation to improvements on acquired land. Independent commissions, including a National Peace and Reconciliation Commission, were established. The new constitution would also reintroduce dual citizenship, which had been abolished in 1984.

Gender equality was strengthened with 60 reserved seats for women in the National Assembly and a Zimbabwe Gender Commission. The Declaration of Rights expanded to include protections from violence and torture, freedom of expression, and alignment with international human rights standards.

== Campaign ==
The campaign was low-key, with all GPA parties urging a yes vote. The National Constitutional Assembly (NCA) campaigned against it, arguing the process was flawed. Civil society and women's groups mobilized support, using social media to engage youth. State media bias favoured ZANU–PF narratives around the process, and there were reports of intimidation. The short timeframe (six weeks) limited public debate.

== Referendum process ==
Voting rules were relaxed: no voters' roll was required; a valid ID sufficed, enabling unregistered individuals, including new voters aged 18 since 2008, to participate. This contributed to high turnout but raised concerns about verification. The process was peaceful, with SADC observers deeming it credible, though Western observers were barred.

=== Issues around the voters' roll ===
The absence of a voters' roll requirement was controversial, with the NCA alleging potential rigging through ballot stuffing and coercion in rural areas. Reports emerged of block voting and party officials pre-registering names. Diaspora voting was denied, limiting participation. These issues foreshadowed problems in the subsequent general election, where the voters' roll was described as "in shambles."

== Results ==
The Zimbabwe Electoral Commission (ZEC) announced results on 19 March 2013: 3,079,966 yes (94.5%), 179,489 no (5.5%), with 56,627 spoilt ballots. Turnout was 59.8%, the highest since independence, with 3,316,082 votes cast. Turnout varied by province, highest in Harare and Mashonaland, lowest in Matabeleland and Bulawayo.

Choice	Votes	%
For	3,079,966	94.49
Against	179,489	5.51
Total	3,259,455	100.00
Valid votes	3,259,455	98.29
Invalid/blank votes	56,627	1.71
Total votes	3,316,082	100.00
Source: BBC

National referendum results (excluding invalid votes)
Yes; 3,079,966 (94.5%)
▲50%

Results by Province
Province	Yes		No		Invalid		Total votes	
Province	Votes	%	Votes	%	Votes		Total votes	
Province	Bulawayo	121,108	92.34	8,514	6.49	1,529	1.17	131,151
Harare	468,176	90.48	41,060	7.93	8,222	1.59	517,458	
Manicaland	388,397	92.97	22,586	5.41	6,802	1.63	417,785	
Mashonaland Central	340,290	95.33	9,703	2.72	6,980	1.96	356,973	
Mashonaland East	374,045	94.26	15,405	3.88	7,377	1.86	396,827	
Mashonaland West	340,597	93.67	17,662	4.86	5,365	1.48	363,624	
Masvingo	376,713	93.04	20,717	5.12	7,459	1.84	404,889	
Matabeleland North	162,236	91.52	11,663	6.58	3,378	1.91	177,277	
Matabeleland South	129,959	91.15	10,040	7.04	2,577	1.81	142,576	
Midlands	378,445	92.86	22,139	5.43	6,938	1.70	407,522	
Total	3,079,966	92.88	179,489	5.41	56,627	1.71	3,316,082	

Results by constituency
Constituency	Province	Yes		No		Invalid		Total votes		
Constituency	Province	Votes	%	Votes	%	Votes		Total votes		
Constituency	Province	Beitbridge East	MBS	12,700	89.81	1,174	8.30	267	1.89	14,141
Beitbridge West	MBS	7,883	86.70	922	10.14	287	3.16	9,092		
Bikita East	MVG	13,032	92.07	827	5.84	295	2.08	14,154		
Bikita South	MVG	12,430	93.71	634	4.78	201	1.52	13,265		
Bikita West	MVG	15,243	92.07	1,030	6.22	283	1.71	16,556		
Bindura North	MSC	27,401	95.17	1,010	3.51	381	1.32	28,792		
Bindura South	MSC	18,205	95.02	607	3.17	347	1.81	19,159		
Binga North	MBN	16,550	89.30	1,434	7.74	549	2.96	18,533		
Binga South	MBN	17,360	91.50	1,212	6.39	400	2.11	18,972		
Bubi	MBN	13,925	92.35	873	5.79	280	1.86	15,078		
Budiriro	HRE	21,731	91.00	1,798	7.53	350	1.47	23,879		
Buhera Central	MCL	16,298	93.93	750	4.32	303	1.75	17,351		
Buhera North	MCL	13,305	96.16	363	2.62	168	1.21	13,836		
Buhera South	MCL	18,707	94.57	759	3.84	316	1.60	19,782		
Buhera West	MCL	16,102	95.26	593	3.51	209	1.24	16,904		
Bulawayo Central	BYO	18,280	91.88	1,395	7.01	221	1.11	19,896		
Bulawayo East	BYO	8,886	89.48	904	9.10	141	1.42	9,931		
Bulawayo South	BYO	8,098	92.79	522	5.98	107	1.23	8,727		
Bulilima East	MBS	10,711	91.34	821	7.00	194	1.65	11,726		
Bulilima West	MBS	8,457	89.37	845	8.93	161	1.70	9,463		
Chakari	MSW	18,117	95.71	507	2.68	305	1.61	18,929		
Chegutu East	MSW	16,966	94.80	671	3.75	260	1.45	17,897		
Chegutu West	MSW	15,006	93.00	939	5.82	191	1.18	16,136		
Chikomba Central	MSE	10,205	91.60	570	5.12	366	3.29	11,141		
Chikomba East	MSE	9,100	93.90	385	3.97	206	2.13	9,691		
Chikomba West	MSE	18,591	94.18	813	4.12	335	1.70	19,739		
Chimanimani East	MCL	15,594	93.19	801	4.79	339	2.03	16,734		
Chimanimani West	MCL	15,128	94.44	658	4.11	232	1.45	16,018		
Chinhoyi	MSW	16,913	92.86	1,133	6.22	168	0.92	18,214		
Chipinge Central	MCL	18,228	91.16	1,298	6.49	469	2.35	19,995		
Chipinge East	MCL	11,512	91.61	816	6.49	238	1.89	12,566		
Chipinge South	MCL	12,788	83.15	2,199	14.30	392	2.55	15,379		
Chipinge West	MCL	11,657	92.00	786	6.20	227	1.79	12,670		
Chiredzi East	MVG	11,861	89.69	890	6.73	474	3.58	13,225		
Chiredzi North	MVG	31,101	95.21	879	2.69	684	2.09	32,664		
Chiredzi South	MVG	9,375	88.24	1,019	9.59	230	2.16	10,624		
Chiredzi West	MVG	23,347	91.39	1,756	6.87	443	1.73	25,546		
Chirumanzu	MID	11,631	92.60	679	5.41	251	2.00	12,561		
Chirumanzu-Zibagwe	MID	17,452	94.58	703	3.81	298	1.61	18,453		
Chitungwiza North	HRE	15,472	89.83	1,404	8.15	348	2.02	17,224		
Chitungwiza South	HRE	18,414	90.53	1,634	8.03	292	1.44	20,340		
Chivi Central	MVG	15,417	92.77	966	5.81	235	1.41	16,618		
Chivi North	MVG	11,714	92.79	633	5.01	277	2.19	12,624		
Chivi South	MVG	15,166	91.81	1,048	6.34	304	1.84	16,518		
Chiwundura	MID	16,779	93.20	979	5.44	245	1.36	18,003		
Dangamvura-Chikanga	MCL	17,186	92.27	1,268	6.81	172	0.92	18,626		
Dzivarasekwa	HRE	14,834	90.82	1,283	7.86	216	1.32	16,333		
Emakhandeni-Entumbane	BYO	8,599	92.74	547	5.90	126	1.36	9,272		
Epworth	HRE	33,203	90.68	2,666	7.28	746	2.04	36,615		
Glen Norah	HRE	10,746	90.94	980	8.29	91	0.77	11,817		
Glenview North	HRE	12,666	90.76	1,135	8.13	154	1.10	13,955		
Glenview South	HRE	12,178	89.64	1,190	8.76	217	1.60	13,585		
Gokwe Central	MID	13,017	90.93	1,072	7.49	226	1.58	14,315		
Gokwe Chireya	MID	17,580	92.89	892	4.71	453	2.39	18,925		
Gokwe Gumunyu	MID	13,676	94.90	486	3.37	249	1.73	14,411		
Gokwe Kabuyuni	MID	14,810	90.51	1,207	7.38	345	2.11	16,362		
Gokwe Kana	MID	12,182	91.93	876	6.61	194	1.46	13,252		
Gokwe Mapfungautsi	MID	15,403	92.64	956	5.75	267	1.61	16,626		
Gokwe Nembudziya	MID	15,280	93.71	726	4.45	299	1.83	16,305		
Gokwe Sasame	MID	13,961	91.33	922	6.03	404	2.64	15,287		
Gokwe Sengwa	MID	11,405	92.60	742	6.02	170	1.38	12,317		
Goromonzi North	MSE	15,471	93.19	861	5.19	264	1.62	16,596		
Goromonzi South	MSE	24,594	92.09	1,561	5.85	551	2.06	26,706		
Goromonzi West	MSE	17,303	92.13	1,152	6.12	328	1.75	18,783		
Guruve North	MSC	21,765	95.85	560	2.47	383	1.69	22,708		
Guruve South	MSC	19,289	95.56	613	3.04	283	1.40	20,185		
Gutu Central	MVG	11,898	93.16	675	5.29	198	1.55	12,771		
Gutu East	MVG	10,133	93.49	495	4.57	211	1.95	10,839		
Gutu North	MVG	8,935	92.52	559	5.79	163	1.69	9,657		
Gutu South	MVG	10,604	93.48	603	5.32	136	1.20	11,343		
Gutu West	MVG	14,890	95.23	559	3.58	187	1.20	15,636		
Gwanda Central	MBS	13,358	92.16	919	6.34	218	1.50	14,495		
Gwanda North	MBS	8,023	93.80	382	4.47	148	1.73	8,553		
Gwanda South	MBS	7,729	90.25	701	8.19	134	1.56	8,564		
Gweru Urban	MID	13,418	92.57	897	6.19	180	1.24	14,495		
Harare Central	HRE	19,253	90.75	1,723	8.12	240	1.13	21,216		
Harare East	HRE	21,307	91.67	1,600	6.88	335	1.44	23,242		
Harare North	HRE	17,300	90.30	1,523	7.95	336	1.75	19,159		
Harare South	HRE	26,630	91.71	1,562	5.38	845	2.91	29,037		
Harare West	HRE	14,619	89.84	1,469	9.03	185	1.14	16,273		
Hatfield	HRE	16,549	90.13	1,582	8.62	230	1.25	18,361		
Headlands	MCL	14,322	92.57	852	5.51	297	1.92	15,471		
Highfield East	HRE	14,631	89.69	1,507	9.24	174	1.07	16,312		
Highfield West	HRE	11,911	90.88	1,037	7.91	158	1.21	13,106		
Hurungwe Central	MSW	15,765	93.58	886	5.26	195	1.16	16,846		
Hurungwe East	MSW	16,643	94.28	728	4.12	282	1.60	17,653		
Hurungwe North	MSW	10,930	92.69	641	5.44	221	1.87	11,792		
Hurungwe West	MSW	10,383	92.71	647	5.78	170	1.52	11,200		
Hwange Central	MBN	13,103	91.78	934	6.54	240	1.68	14,277		
Hwange East	MBN	14,010	92.65	888	5.87	223	1.47	15,121		
Hwange West	MBN	8,824	90.39	703	7.20	235	2.41	9,762		
Insiza North	MBS	12,772	91.97	904	6.51	211	1.52	13,887		
Insiza South	MBS	7,143	93.19	374	4.88	148	1.93	7,665		
Kadoma Central	MSW	15,078	91.10	1,256	7.59	217	1.31	16,551		
Kambuzuma	HRE	10,539	91.56	845	7.34	127	1.10	11,511		
Kariba	MSW	18,226	92.72	1,120	5.70	310	1.58	19,656		
Kuwadzana East	HRE	11,851	90.56	1,132	8.65	103	0.79	13,086		
Kuwadzana	HRE	15,428	90.90	1,366	8.05	178	1.05	16,972		
Kwekwe Central	MID	10,522	92.71	716	6.31	111	0.98	11,349		
Lobengula	BYO	8,022	93.76	449	5.25	85	0.99	8,556		
Lupane East	MBN	10,064	90.81	824	7.44	194	1.75	11,082		
Lupane West	MBN	9,006	92.64	565	5.81	151	1.55	9,722		
Luveve	BYO	10,726	92.05	816	7.00	110	0.94	11,652		
Mabvuku-Tafara	HRE	14,559	91.65	1,140	7.18	187	1.18	15,886		
Magunje	MSW	10,449	91.76	728	6.39	210	1.84	11,387		
Magwegwe	BYO	6,921	92.82	457	6.13	78	1.05	7,456		
Makokoba	BYO	9,426	92.25	620	6.07	172	1.68	10,218		
Makonde	MSW	17,248	94.49	766	4.20	239	1.31	18,253		
Makoni Central	MCL	14,337	92.36	968	6.24	218	1.40	15,523		
Makoni North	MCL	12,214	94.89	658	5.11	0	0.00	12,872		
Makoni South	MCL	15,839	94.07	710	4.22	289	1.72	16,838		
Makoni West	MCL	10,941	93.75	535	4.58	195	1.67	11,671		
Mangwe	MBS	10,517	89.42	1,222	10.39	237	0.20	11,976		
Maramba Pfungwe	MSE	21,783	96.74	253	1.12	480	2.13	22,516		
Marondera Central	MSE	15,922	91.95	1,121	6.47	273	1.58	17,316		
Marondera East	MSE	17,033	94.80	616	3.43	319	1.78	17,968		
Marondera West	MSE	11,420	91.27	651	5.20	442	3.53	12,513		
Masvingo Central	MVG	11,720	93.88	553	4.43	211	1.69	12,484		
Masvingo North	MVG	13,937	93.39	704	4.72	283	1.90	14,924		
Masvingo South	MVG	12,653	92.45	761	5.56	273	1.99	13,687		
Masvingo Urban	MVG	19,943	91.88	1,540	7.09	223	1.03	21,706		
Masvingo West	MVG	12,081	93.31	609	4.70	257	1.99	12,947		
Matobo North	MBS	9,479	92.98	515	5.05	201	1.97	10,195		
Matobo South	MBS	7,311	94.56	299	3.87	122	1.58	7,732		
Mazowe Central	MSC	13,154	92.36	776	5.45	312	2.19	14,242		
Mazowe North	MSC	15,585	94.95	513	3.13	316	1.93	16,414		
Mazowe South	MSC	15,505	91.38	889	5.24	574	3.38	16,968		
Mazowe West	MSC	14,520	93.57	605	3.90	392	2.53	15,517		
Mbare	HRE	28,683	90.51	2,300	7.26	707	2.23	31,690		
Mberengwa East	MID	9,710	93.04	529	5.07	197	1.89	10,436		
Mberengwa North	MID	16,279	94.13	691	4.00	324	1.87	17,294		
Mberengwa South	MID	13,134	94.59	514	3.70	237	1.71	13,885		
Mberengwa West	MID	9,106	92.80	488	4.97	218	2.22	9,812		
Mbire	MSC	17,141	93.85	739	4.05	384	2.10	18,264		
Mbizo	MID	11,081	93.68	611	5.17	136	1.15	11,828		
Mhangura	MSW	19,704	95.91	585	2.85	255	1.24	20,544		
Mhondoro-Mubaira	MSW	13,676	91.79	964	6.47	260	1.74	14,900		
Mhondoro-Ngezi	MSW	16,564	94.92	598	3.43	288	1.65	17,450		
Mkoba	MID	12,454	93.25	752	5.63	150	1.12	13,356		
Mount Darwin East	MSC	20,677	97.20	316	1.49	270	1.32	21,263		
Mount Darwin North	MSC	17,019	96.28	335	1.90	323	1.83	17,677		
Mount Darwin South	MSC	20,426	96.58	402	1.90	322	1.52	21,150		
Mount Darwin West	MSC	21,304	96.13	472	2.13	385	1.74	22,161		
Mount Pleasant	HRE	11,969	88.90	1,362	10.12	133	0.99	13,464		
Mudzi North	MSE	17,124	94.81	624	3.45	314	1.74	18,062		
Mudzi South	MSE	15,294	95.55	414	2.59	299	1.87	16,007		
Mudzi West	MSE	13,695	96.41	208	1.46	302	2.13	14,205		
Mufakose	HRE	8,623	91.97	634	6.76	119	1.27	9,376		
Murewa North	MSE	17,160	94.97	665	3.68	238	1.35	18,063		
Murewa South	MSE	19,114	95.67	549	2.75	316	1.58	19,979		
Murewa West	MSE	16,075	92.82	838	4.84	406	2.34	17,319		
Musikavanhu	MCL	9,732	90.26	859	7.97	191	1.77	10,782		
Mutare Central	MCL	14,302	91.95	1,068	6.87	184	1.18	15,554		
Mutare North	MCL	19,954	93.47	1,059	4.96	336	1.57	21,349		
Mutare South	MCL	16,622	92.90	939	5.25	332	1.86	17,893		
Mutare West	MCL	18,917	93.63	954	4.72	332	1.64	20,203		
Mutasa Central	MCL	13,820	94.72	610	4.18	160	1.10	14,590		
Mutasa North	MCL	13,458	94.01	606	4.23	251	1.75	14,315		
Mutasa South	MCL	15,533	92.42	1,011	6.02	263	1.56	16,807		
Mutoko East	MSE	14,584	95.99	378	2.49	231	1.52	15,193		
Mutoko North	MSE	16,944	94.81	568	3.18	359	2.01	17,871		
Mutoko South	MSE	19,573	95.83	506	2.48	345	1.69	20,424		
Muzarabani North	MSC	15,068	96.49	234	1.50	314	2.01	15,616		
Muzarabani South	MSC	18,118	95.60	350	1.85	483	2.55	18,951		
Muzvezve	MSW	18,357	94.09	875	4.48	278	1.42	19,510		
Mwenezi East	MVG	19,279	94.38	738	3.61	409	2.00	20,426		
Mwenezi West	MVG	23,243	95.28	646	2.65	506	2.07	24,395		
Nkayi North	MBN	9,904	91.03	770	7.08	206	1.89	10,880		
Nkayi South	MBN	11,041	92.58	707	5.93	178	1.49	11,926		
Nketa	BYO	10,907	92.14	810	6.84	120	1.01	11,837		
Nkulumane	BYO	11,792	93.11	742	5.86	130	1.03	12,664		
Norton	MSW	17,322	92.66	1,157	6.19	216	1.16	18,695		
Nyanga North	MCL	15,062	93.97	638	3.98	329	2.05	16,029		
Nyanga South	MCL	16,839	93.41	828	4.59	360	2.00	18,027		
Pelandaba-Mpopoma	BYO	9,444	92.99	592	5.83	120	1.18	10,156		
Pumula	BYO	10,007	92.78	660	6.12	119	1.10	10,786		
Redcliff	MID	13,792	93.20	837	5.66	169	1.14	14,798		
Rushinga	MSC	23,930	96.27	350	1.41	576	2.32	24,856		
Sanyati	MSW	12,167	94.10	521	4.03	242	1.87	12,930		
Seke	MSE	18,928	91.60	1,426	6.90	309	1.50	20,663		
Shamva North	MSC	18,919	95.34	489	2.46	435	2.19	19,843		
Shamva South	MSC	22,264	95.94	443	1.91	500	2.15	23,207		
Shurugwi North	MID	13,968	93.05	856	5.70	187	1.25	15,011		
Shurugwi South	MID	11,339	94.08	576	4.78	138	1.14	12,053		
Silobela	MID	14,524	91.77	842	5.32	460	2.91	15,826		
Southerton	HRE	12,025	90.70	1,058	7.98	175	1.32	13,258		
St Mary's	HRE	15,974	87.94	1,731	9.53	459	2.53	18,164		
Sunningdale	HRE	11,509	88.52	1,114	8.57	379	2.91	13,002		
Tsholotsho North	MBN	9,160	92.10	635	6.38	151	1.52	9,946		
Tsholotsho South	MBN	9,606	89.32	967	8.99	182	1.69	10,755		
Umguza	MBN	19,683	92.74	1,151	5.42	389	1.83	21,223		
Umzingwane	MBS	13,876	91.89	962	6.37	249	1.74	15,087		
Uzumba	MSE	20,416	97.12	341	1.62	265	1.26	21,022		
Vungu	MID	10,060	93.30	579	5.37	143	1.33	10,782		
Warren Park	HRE	15,265	90.58	1,411	8.37	176	1.04	16,852		
Wedza North	MSE	14,626	94.97	510	3.31	264	1.71	15,400		
Wedza South	MSE	9,090	94.20	395	4.09	165	1.71	9,650		
Zaka Central	MVG	14,209	93.25	717	4.71	312	2.05	15,238		
Zaka East	MVG	10,573	94.57	456	4.08	151	1.35	11,180		
Zaka North	MVG	13,830	92.58	854	5.72	254	1.70	14,938		
Zaka West	MVG	10,099	92.45	566	5.18	259	2.37	10,924		
Zengeza East	HRE	15,465	89.98	1,416	8.24	307	1.79	17,188		
Zengeza West	HRE	14,842	89.65	1,458	8.81	255	1.54	16,555		
Zhombe	MID	15,481	91.71	1,018	6.03	381	2.26	16,880		
Zvimba East	MSW	14,378	92.33	949	6.09	245	1.57	15,572		
Zvimba North	MSW	16,330	94.82	614	3.57	278	1.61	17,222		
Zvimba South	MSW	16,017	94.11	722	4.24	280	1.65	17,019		
Zvimba West	MSW	14,358	94.04	655	4.29	255	1.67	15,268		
Zvishavane Ngezi	MID	16,810	91.25	1,313	7.13	299	1.62	18,422		
Zvishavane Runde	MID	13,591	93.87	680	4.70	207	1.43	14,478		
Total		3,079,966	92.88	179,489	5.41	56,627	1.71	3,316,082		
Total		Votes	%	Votes	%	Votes	%	Total votes		
Total						Invalid		Total votes		
Total		Yes		No		Invalid		Total votes		

== Aftermath ==
President Mugabe signed the constitution into law on 22 May 2013. Certain provisions of the Constitution (principally the Declaration of Rights and provisions for presidential and parliamentary elections) came into operation on 22 May 2013, when Act 1 of 2013 was published. That date was the “publication day” as defined in paragraph 1 of the Sixth Schedule to the Constitution. The provisions that came into operation then are set out in paragraph 3 of that Schedule.

The rest of the Constitution came into operation on 22 August 2013, when the President was sworn in after the first elections following the Act's assent; this date is the “effective date” as defined in paragraph 1 of the Sixth Schedule to the Constitution. Some of the new constitution's clauses, however, would not take effect for 10 years.

The 2013 elections, where ZANU–PF secured a landslide victory, were conducted in line with the new constitution. However, post-referendum arrests of opposition figures and civil society leaders raised concerns about implementation. Amnesty International noted the potential for a new human rights culture but called for repealing repressive laws and funding commissions. The constitution has since been amended multiple times, including expansions for youth representation and changes to judicial appointments.
