= Hwata (senatorial constituency) =

- Former Senatorial constituency for the Parliament of Zimbabwe
- Region: Harare
- Population: 275,928

Former constituency
- Created: 2008
- Abolished: 2013
- Seats: 1

Hwata was a senatorial constituency in the Senate of Zimbabwe. The seat was named after the Hwata Dynasty which was founded by Shayachimwe in the 19th century. It covered the following parliamentary constituencies in the National Assembly of Zimbabwe, situated in the west of Harare:

- Budiriro
- Dzivarasekwa
- Glen Norah
- Glen View North
- Glen View South
- Highfield East
- Highfield West
- Kambuzuma
- Kuwadzana
- Kuwadzana East
- Mufakose

In the 2008 election, the constituency elected MDC-T member Rorana Muchiwa as senator. He beat an MDC member Mavis Musinami, ZANU-PF member (and former Mayor of Harare) Charles Tawengwa and independent candidate Kambeve Tinei.

Under the Zimbabwe Youth Council, Hwata has also had Junior Senators in office to meet the administration of its children. In 2013 a Mufakose 1 High student by the name of Jerrial managed to ascend to the position of Hwata Jr Senator after having out done 25 other students from different schools in a public speaking campaign contest. In 2014, after his term of office, it was Allan Chawandika of Highfield 2 High who succeed him after having been outstanding as well in the juniors campaign. The junior senatorial post in 2015 was seized by Takudzwa Falanela of Mufakose 1 High School again who reigned victorious after a fierce public speaking competition in which he contested alongside 28 other prospectives.

2008 general election
Candidate	Party	Votes	%
Rorana Muchiwa	MDC-T	67,131	73.94
Charles Tawengwa	ZANU-PF	14,582	16.06
Mavis Musinami	MDC	6,719	7.40
Tinei Kambeve	Independent	2,354	2.59
Total		90,786	100.00
Registered voters/turnout		275,928	–
Source: Kubatana.net
