= Tendai Mukomberanwa =

Zimbabwean sculptor (born 1974)

- Born: Tendai Mukomberanwa; Ruwa, Zimbabwe
- Occupations: Sculptor, teacher
- Parents: Nicholas Mukomberanwa (father); Grace Mukomberanwa (mother)
- Relatives: Anderson Mukomberanwa (brother); Ennica Mukomberanwa (sister); Lawrence Mukomberanwa(brother); Nesbert Mukomberanwa (cousin); Netsai Mukomberanwa (sister); Taguma Mukomberanwa (brother)

Tendai Mukomberanwa (born 1974) is a Zimbabwean sculptor. The son of Grace Mukomberanwa and Nicholas Mukomberanwa, Tendai worked with his father from age 10 in his early childhood days. His artwork has been sold and exhibited worldwide. He continues sculpting at the family studios in Ruwa.

== Career ==
Tendai began sculpting from a young age under the training of his father, world-renowned artist, Nicholas Mukomberanwa. He then received academic training by earning a Bachelor of Fine Arts from Sonoma State University in California. He then moved to South Africa where he worked as a computer teacher. He continues to sculpt at the family studio.

He is a member of the Mukomberanwa family of sculptors. Mukomberanwa is the brother of Anderson, Tendai, Taguma, Netsai, and Ennica Mukomberanwa, and the cousin of Nesbert Mukomberanwa, all of whom are sculptors.
