= Hwata dynasty =

Term in Zimbabwean history

The Hwata dynasty ruled part of what is now Zimbabwe, beginning with Shayachimwe Mukombami, the founding father of the Hwata Mufakose people, who ruled from 1775 to 1820.

== Origin ==
Three brothers, Shayachimwe, Nyakudya, and Gutsa, who were of the Shava Dynasty and the Museyamwa totem, migrated northwards from Buhera (Va Hera) in the south of Zimbabwe in the late eighteenth century. Legend has it that Gutsa was a volatile warrior who killed some relatives for abuse of power and women, and the three brothers ran away together between 1760 and 1780. The three brothers were invited by elder brother, Chief Seke Mutema to settle in the Harava area. Later, Gutsa was introduced by Seke to Chief Mbare of the Shumba Gurundoro totem, who resided in the present-day city of Harare, as a skilled iron-monger. Chief Mbare settled the three brothers on the Barapata hill. For a while, Shayachimwe, Gutsa and Nyakudya lived under Chief Mbare, but a plot was hatched by Chief Seke, and the Va Hera brothers killed Chief Mbare and took his lands, which stretched to the south of modern-day Harare.

In due course, the three brothers moved north and defeated Chief Zumbo at Mazoe. The Zumbo people nicknamed Shayachimwe Hwata because he had long legs and walked like a hwata, the secretarybird.

These northern Va Hera did not form a single dynasty, but instead formed a confederacy of two units which reported to Seke. The Hwata Dynasty was founded by Shayachimwe Mukombami about 1760 and the Chiweshe dynasty was founded by Nyakudya's son Nyamhangambiri. The Hwata dynasty became more dominant and stretched from present day Harare, past the Mazoe Dam (then commonly known as pagomba) to modern day Glendale and to the heads of the Mazoe, Tateguru and Murowodzi valleys. Gutsa, the youngest brother, did not form a dynasty of his own. Shayachimwe and Nyamhangambiri abandoned their praise name of Museyamwa. Hwata Shayachimwe assumed the new praise name of Mufakose which means (I have lost both ways) while Chiweshe Nyangambiri assumed the praise name of Mutenhesanwa. Hwata Shayachimwe established his capital at Barapata Hill on the modern Mufakose suburb in Salisbury now called Harare, capital city of Zimbabwe.

== First Chimurenga (1896–1897) ==
The first half of the nineteenth century saw a considerable rise in the prosperity of the Va Hera who settled in the area around present day Harare between 1760 and 1780. The Hwata dynasty took control of the Shawasha gold fields and a succession of Hwata rulers, the sons of Shayachimwe, dominated trade with Portuguese from the East. This prosperity attracted attention, and the Va Hera were raided and defeated by the Ndebele from 1861 to 1864. Hwata Gwindi travelled to King Lobengula in 1864, to discuss end of hostilities so that they can face common enemy, the British South Africa Company which was occupying parts of the country and taking over their mines and lands.

On 12 September 1890, white settlers of British extraction led by a hunter, Selous, hoisted the British flag in the territory of Hwata, in present-day Harare in Mashonaland, Zimbabwe. They claimed the land as a British discovery in the name of the Queen of Great Britain. They called the country Southern Rhodesia.

Hwata Chiripanyanga who became Chief Hwata in 1892, played a leadership role in the First Chimurenga war of Southern Rhodesia in June 1896. He worked with Nehanda Nyakasina to organise resistance by the Hwata people against British settlers who had invaded their lands at PaGomba in Mazoe valley. Hwata lost the lives of 100 fighters in guerrilla type battles with British settlers. He surrendered together with Mbuya Nehanda for their participation in the war. Mbuya Nehanda is referred to as Nyanda in most early history records. Other families that have branches from Hwata Dynasty include Mhasvi, Gotora, Nyariri, Mhembere, Katambarare, Ziwange, Mabvurambudzi; Meda; Warambwa; Garwe, Kanengoni, Chivero, Mandaza, Gomera, Goredema, Muringai, Chidamba, Chiverere, Ndewere, Chakuchichi, Mandizha, Mutambirwa, Matsvetu, Ngoshi, Kaseke.

=== Battle of Mazoe (June 1896) ===
In June 1896 Chief Mashayamombe led a rebellion against white occupation in the Mhondoro-Hartely (now Chegutu) area. Hwata Chiripanyanga and Nehanda Nyakasikana Ambuya Nehanda also referred to as the witch Nyanda in British records of that period, heard this news and organised uprising against the British settlers from their lands at Mazoe. (A film in which Stella Chiweshe played the role of Ambuya Nehanda, died 1896, has been made.)

Hwata Chiripanyanga, the grandson of Shayachimwe Mukombami and son of Guvamombe, became Mambo (King) of the Hwata people in 1892. Succession of Hwata Mambos and their subjects had bought guns over the years from Portuguese traders in exchange for gold from the Mazoe and Chishawasha mines. The guns were used for hunting and protecting themselves against Ndebele invasions. When the news of the Mashayamombe rebellion reached Mazoe, Mambo Hwata summoned all his subjects and asked them to bring their guns (zvigidi). Mambo Hwata then asked the family spirit medium, Charwe Nyakasikana Known as Mbuya Nehanda to consult the ancestors. Mbuya Nehanda gave the assurance to the Hwata people that they were fighting a good cause and that the spirits of the forefathers (masvikiro), would protect them in the same way that they had led them from Buhera through many conquests.

==== War strategy ====
A British South Africa Company policeman called Mhasvi son of Gotora from one of the Hwata houses leaders named Hiya, deserted the British to join the rebellion at Mazoe. He was made commander of the army and trained the Hwata men on how to shoot with guns. Mambo Hwata gave orders to cut telephone lines and gave his men letters to take to all British families in the area, with the instruction that the men should attack and kill all British men who came out to receive the fake letters. This news reached the British families in the area and they sought refuge at Mazoe Mine. An initial army of 20 villagers attacked a British convoy of 6 British men (Faull, Cass, Dickensen, Pascoe, Fairbairn and Stoddart) who had left Mazoe mine driving a donkey cart towards Salisbury. They had left their wives at Mazoe Mine.

The villagers shot and killed Cass, followed by one Dickenson. Shortly after, the Hwata soldiers attempted to ambush the remaining four British men by pretending to be friendly Mashona. The four became suspicious of their knobkerries, and started to open fire. The donkey kart was hastily turned around, with one Pascoe and Faull scrambled in front, and a Fairbairn and Stobbart following behind. After travelling a hundred yards, the Hwata shot at Faull, and his body slumped to the ground. Fairbairn returned fire and killed a Hwata youth. There was an exchange of fire between the Hwata villagers and the remaining two British men, who fled to the mine after Fairbairn's gun jammed. Meanwhile, Blakiston, Darling, Spreckley and Hendrik who had remained at the mine decided to accompany the three women on a wagonette to Salisbury. They were attacked by fifty armed villagers, and they immediately returned unharmed to the mine. Later, Blakiston persuaded Routledge to accompany him to the grass thatched hut to send a rescue telegraph to Salisbury.

They managed to send a message that read: "We are surrounded. Dickensen, Cass, Faull killed ... for God's sake ..." and "We are surrounded, send us help, this is our only chance. Goodbye". Blakiston, standing in the doorway of the pole and dagga hut scanning the grass and bush, shouted as he saw the villagers swarming their line of retreat.

Off they set, with Routledge on the saddle and Blakiston running at his side. Bullets whistled round their heads as the natives swarmed towards their line of retreat, but they managed to cover half the journey in safety until they were in full view of their colleagues at the mine. Suddenly the horse was seen to fall and Routledge was thrown to the ground; he rose and made for cover, but was shot. Blakiston gained cover of the bush hotly pursued by the villagers; shots were heard, and Blakiston was never seen again. Six British men had been killed at Mazoe in a day. What needs to be corrected is that the Settlers tried to downplay the strength and power of the Hwata Dynasty by coming up with a false narrative that Mhasvi was a rebel policemen from Salisbury from the Harava clan and not from the Hwata clan, this is NOT true. Mhasvi was a son of the Hwata Dynasty.

==== Judson rescue party ====
On 18 June 1896, concerned about the safety of the party at Mazoe Mine, the Administrator for Harare, Judge Vincent, organised Dan Judson and four men (Honey, Godfrey King, Hendriks, Guyen and Stamford Brown) to travel from Harare to Mazoe to rescue the besieged inhabitants. Judson's party left Harare just after sunset and followed the old Mazoe road via Marlborough. They were joined by another five men at Mount Hampden, going past the Salvation Army farm where the late Cass lived. A mile later, they came under fierce gun attack from dense bush. Niebuhr was shot in the hand and his horse died. Rawson's horse was also shot dead and the two got rides from Judson and Hendrik. They rode through the bush, where horses were shot and Niebuhr was injured seriously. Three villagers were killed. The Judson party survived the hail of gunshots and arrived safely at Mazoe mine. However, the mine remained under heavy attack. Rawson acknowledged in his report that Mhasvi managed to keep up a steady fire with great accuracy. There were no further casualties at the mine on this day. However, later that evening, Charles Annesty, a prospector who was returning to the mine from Chipadze kraal riding a donkey, was shot dead by the locals. The assault on the mine resumed at dawn on 19 June 1896 with barrages of gunfire which continued until midday.

==== Nesbitt Mazoe patrol ====
Meanwhile, in Salisbury, Judge Vincent dispatched another patrol of 13 men to assist Dan Judson at Mazoe mine. They left at 10.30 pm under the command of Captain Nesbitt. Their departure was noticed by Africans who sent their traditional fire messages at hilltops that warned others of approaching danger. Captain Nesbitt's party endured gun attack from the Hwata people and suffered injury of only one man and his horse. They arrived at the mine safely at dawn on 20 June 1896. The party of 30 men and 3 women departed from Mazoe for Salisburyat midday on 20 June 1896 with a wagon of 6 horses and 12 men on foot. The Hwata people commenced attack from both sides of the road after just half a mile but with no injury. The gun attack intensified when the party reached Chomukoreka near Vesuvius Mine. Every tree or rock appeared to hide a Hwata man and they were invisible because of the tall grass.

At this spot, Troopers McGeer and Jacobs were shot dead, together with the horses belonging to Captain Nesbitt and Trooper Edmonds. Pascoe decided to sit on the roof of the wagon to look out for the enemy, and survived, except for a bullet that went through his hat. Bullets continued to hail on the sides of the wagon which was protected by metal sheets. There were about 50 Hwata men in pursuit with a wide variety of guns which included Lee-Metfords, Martini Henry's, and muzzle loaders into which they crammed nails and stones. The grass swarmed with black people, and Trooper Van Staden died after his head was blown off and Ogilvie and Burton were wounded. Another bullet ripped through the face of Burton and fell into the wagon to be tendered by the women.

Hendrikz who had split from the main party, received a bullet which passed through both cheeks, taking with it a piece of his tongue and jawbone. When the men reached the Tatagura river, they failed to quench their raging thirst as the firing never let up. When the party reached open land, just before Gwebi river the Hwata people pulled back after they received information that reinforcements with a Maxim gun (nganunu) were to be sent from Salisbury. This plan had however not been followed through and Nesbitt's party was able to proceed to Salisbury. The Hwata people celebrated their success in driving white British people from their lands. Captain Randolph Crosby Nesbitt received the Victorian Cross from the Queen of Great Britain.

=== British revenge ===
The triumph of the Hwata people was short-lived. The BSAC reorganised and returned to Mazoe with many soldiers to re-establish control. They established a base at Fort Mazoe from where they hunted down the leaders of the rebellion. They found many homes deserted. Some villagers had fled north to Chiweshe lands, while others went and hid in the Shavarunzwe caves. Those in Shavarunzwe caves were smoked out with dynamite which destroyed part of the Hwata shrine. British soldiers went from village to village where they shot and killed any males that fled, burnt several huts of the villagers and stole cattle and grain. The purge went on for three months and to save their people, Mambo Hwata, Nehanda Nyakasikana and Mhasvi came out from hiding and surrendered to the police. No evidence could be found for their participation in the rebellion which killed many British people. However, they were tried for the murder of the Mazoe Native Commissioner, Pollard and sentenced to death. Mhasvi was surprisingly pardoned for exemplary behaviour after his arrest.

When she was sentenced to death by the Southern Rhodesia colony of Great Britain, Mbuya Nehanda left her ritual authority with Mandaza. Mandaza was the grandson of Hwata Shayachimwe's fourth son, Kamuteku. Mandaza's descendants are Goredema, Muringai, Chiverere and Ndewere families.

As a consequence of this defeat, both Hwata Chiweshe lost all their lands, stretching from Harare to Mazoe and Mvurwi. Their subjects were placed under the rule of other chiefs such as Negomo and Matope. Although a large part of Mazoe District is named Chiweshe, these are, in fact, lands of the MaKorekore Negomo and Matope Dynasties, descendants of Nyatsimba Mutota founder of the Munhumutapa Empire. A small section of the Hwata family founded a dynasty at Dande in Guruve under a new Mambo Hwata Chitsinde in the Zambezi valley in 1959, but the majority of descendants of Hwata remain scattered in the Chiweshe communal lands. Some have moved away to find new homes elsewhere in Zvimba, Mhondoro Hurungwe, Chinamhora, Mrewa, Goromonzi and Guruve. A number of Mufakose families related to Nehanda, Goredema and Zumba have been making claims to be returned to the land of their ancestors since 1980. These lands have not yet been returned to the Hwata people, and instead, other people who are in the echelons of government have been given vast tracts of land seized from white farmers since the year 2000.

== Second Chimurenga (1973–1980) ==
The Hwata people endured the brunt of the Second Chimurenga, the war of liberation that finally defeated the white rulers of Southern Rhodesia. Many Hwata youths took up arms to participate in the war of liberation between 1973 and 1979 which brought independence from British rule on 18 April 1980.

However, due to lack of public records of their role (this one just being discovered thanks to Internet), Mambo Hwata and Mhasvi have not yet been recognised for their contribution to First Chimurenga by the Zimbabwe Government. Mashayamombe, another leader of First Chimurenga has not been recognised either. Their spirit mediums however, Nehanda Nyakasikana and Kaguvi respectively, have received much recognition, with a road in Harare and a maternity wing at Parirenyatwa Hospital being named after Mbuya Nehanda, while a prominent government building has been named after Kaguvi. Other less deserving contributors to the struggle against white domination like Rekayi Tangwena are buried at the country's heroes acre.

== Hwata religion ==
Nehanda Charwe also known as Mbuya Nehanda and referred to as Nyanda in other literature was a Mhondoro (svikiro) of the Hwata Zezuru people. She was the spirit medium to the higher God called Mwari. The traditional Hwata did not believe in Christianity although they acknowledge the existence of God. When Mbuya Nehanda was executed, she refused to be baptised before being killed. Her last words was a request to pass on her ritual equipment to Mandaza Goredema, a descendant of the fourth Mambo Hwata Kamuteku, and son of Goredema Mazarura, who was the Chief when died in 1890. Goredema Mazarura is the ancestor of the Goredema, Mandaza, Mazarura, Ziwange, Muringai, Kupara, Chiverere and Ndewere families. The svikiro (spirit mediums) of Mbuya Nehanda can only be appeased by the Goredema Hwata people. Mbuya Nehanda (Charwe) is a Shava Mufakose spirit medium and is different from Nehanda Nyakasikana who was Nyamhika, daughter of Nyatsimba Mutota (Korekore tribe) of the Nzou Samanyanga totem and founder of the Munhumutapa Empire in 1430. Writers confuse these two spirit mediums.

== Hwata chieftainships ==
=== History ===
Shayachimwe Mukombami was the founding father of the Hwata Mufakose people. When Hwata Shayachimwe died, his elder daughter, Tete Minge, succeeded as Queen, in trust for her young minor brother, Prince Kamuteku, son of the Vahosi (First Wife). Tete Minge was overwhelmed by the responsibilities of leadership, and she passed on the tsvimbo (crown) to her half brother, Kaviya, son of the second wife. When King Kaviya died, Prince Kamuteku then became King.

Hwata Shayachimwe had ten sons. These took turns to be Mambo (King) according to their ages. Prince Mpfeki Mukodzonge was Shayachimwe's first son. However, he did not succeed to the throne because he predeceased his father. His children did not inherit the right to the throne. In Hwata Shona tradition, when the father dies, the tsvimbo (crown) passes down to his next eldest brother from the main house (Yavahosi). The crown does not pass down the descendants of the reigning Prince as practiced in the English kingdom. Prince Pfeki Mukodzonge's children did not become Mambo. Their male line uncles (babamudiki) took turns in succession to be Mambo.

=== Mambos ===
Listed below are the Mambos recorded by the Ministry of Home Affairs, Mazoe District based at Concession, Mashonaland Central, Zimbabwe, and in the genealogy recorded by J. D. White (1986).

1. Hwata 1st Shayachimwe Mukombami (1775–1820)
2. Shayachimwe's first son, Mpfeki Mukodzonge did not ascend to the throne, and he predeceased his father.
3. Hwata 2nd Tete Minge (1820–1837), Hwata's elder daughter was Queen on behalf of her minor Brother, Kamuteku. Tete Minge gave up power to her half-brother Kaviya Zaranyika when she could not cope.
4. Hwata 3rd Kaviya Zaranyika (1837–1847), 3rd son of Shayachimwe, had sons Shutu and Mubaira
5. Hwata 4th Kamuteku (1847–1855), 1st son of Shayachimwe with first wife (Vahosi), had sons Goredema Mazarura and Mutimumwe
6. Hwata 5th Katambarare Meda (1855–1860), 5th son of Shayachimwe, had son Mavhurambudzi
7. Hwata 6th Nherera Gwindi (1860–1886), 6th son of Shayachimwe, had son Mazarura Gwindi
8. Hwata 7th Bungu (1886–1888), 7th son of Shayachimwe Mukombami, had sons Kaseke and Musemwa.
9. Hwata 8th Mazarura Goredema Gwindi (ii) (1888–1890), son of Nherera Gwindi and grandson of Shayachimwe.
10. Hwata 9th Chiripanyanga (1890–1898), grandson of Shayachimwe and son of Gubangombe (9th son of Shayachimwe). Chiripanyanga was executed together with Mbuya Nehanda by British settlers in 1898.
11. Hwata 10th Mavurambudzi (1898–1922), grandson of Shayachimwe and son of Katambarare Meda.
12. Hwata 11th Mukodzonge Chakuchichi (1936–1951), great-grandson of Mpfeki Mukodzonge, first son of Shayachimwe Mukombami.
13. Acting Chief Hwata Nyakudya, 1 December 1951 to 31 May 1959
14. Hwata 12th Gayi Henry Chitsinde (1 June 1959 to 11 November 1959 and died), grandson of Chopamba, the 10th son of Shayachimwe.
15. Acting Chiefs for two-year periods between 1959 and 1969.
16. Chief Hwata Zwidzai Thomas, 12 December 1969 to 11 December 1971
17. Hwata 13th Maxwell Dzapasi Musemwa (1972 to 21 March 2025), a descendant of Bungu, 7th son of Shayachimwe.
18. Hwata 14th Leslie Gwindi (22 March 2025 to present date), descendant of the Gwindi lineage in chieftainship.

== See also ==
- Hwata (Senatorial constituency)
