= Mukomberanwa family =

Mukomberanwa is the family name of renowned Zimbabwean sculptors. Nicholas Mukomberanwa, together with his wife, Grace Mukomberanwa were one of the first generation of Zimbabwean sculptors of Shona art sculptors. Zimbabwean sculptors are separated into "generations" based on the period that one started working with stone. They trained their relatives, including children and nephews in the same craft, who later gained a name for themselves in the industry and became a part of the second and third generations of Zimbabwe sculptors. Grace and Nicholas had six children together. The children of Nicholas, in order of birth, were Anderson Mukomberanwa, Malachia Mukomberanwa, Lawrence Mukomberanwa, Taguma Mukomberanwa, Tendai Mukomberanwa, Netsai Mukomberanwa, and the youngestEnnica Mukomberanwa.

== Artists ==
They trained the second and third generation of Zimbabwean sculptors, many of whom became famous sculptors internationally. The family members who are considered the second generation of sculptors are:

- Anderson Mukomberanwa (second generation)
- Ennica Mukomberanwa
- Lawrence Mukomberanwa (third generation)
- Nesbert Mukomberanwa
- Netsai Mukomberanwa
- Taguma Mukomberanwa
- Tendai Mukomberanwa
