= Kuwadzana (constituency) =

Constituency of the Parliament of Zimbabwe

- Former National Assembly constituency for the Parliament of Zimbabwe
- Province: Harare
- Region: Harare
- Major settlements: Kuwadzana

Former constituency
- Abolished: 2023
- Replaced by: Kuwadzana East, Kuwadzana West

Kuwadzana was a constituency represented in the National Assembly of the Parliament of Zimbabwe. The seat was dissolved for the 2023 Zimbabwean general election into Kuwadzana East and Kuwadzana West.

== Members ==
Election	Name	Party	Information
2018	Miriam Mushayi	MDC Alliance	Died 7 September 2020.
2022 by-election	Johnson Matambo	CCC	Elected 26 March 2022.

== See also ==
- List of Zimbabwean parliamentary constituencies
