= Ennica Mukomberanwa =

Zimbabwean sculptor (born 1978)

- Born: Ruwa, Rhodesia
- Occupation: Sculpture
- Parents: Nicholas Mukomberanwa (father); Grace Mukomberanwa (mother)
- Relatives: Anderson Mukomberanwa (sister); Lawrence Mukomberanwa (brother); Nesbert Mukomberanwa (cousin); Netsai Mukomberanwa(sister); Taguma Mukomberanwa (brother); Tendai Mukomberanwa (brother)

Ennica Mukomberanwa (born 1978) is a Zimbabwean sculptor. The daughter of Grace Mukomberanwa and Nicholas Mukomberanwa, she was trained by the first generation of sculptures. Her work is exhibited in private collections and at galleries around the world. She is a third generation Zimbabwean sculptor. In 2004, she was awarded a prize which allowed her to travel to Stockholm, Copenhagen, Scotland, and Canada. She is a member of the Mukomberanwa family of sculptors. She is the daughter of Grace Mukomberanwa and Nicholas Mukomberanwa, who served as her mentor. She is the sister of sculptors Anderson, Netsai, Taguma, Tendai Mukomberanwa and Lawrence Mukomberanwa, and the cousin of Nesbert Mukomberanwa.

== Career ==
Her work focuses on Shona culture and she mainly created smaller statutes although she has created a number of larger ones. She was one of the artists on featured at the International Sculpture symposium" held by the Andres Institute of Art in New Hampshire, CT in 2014 where she worked with granite stone. Her educational background college is in education and human resources.

== Exhibitions ==
- Nashua International Sculpture Symposium 2015. Mother and Child stone sculpture, Nashua, New Hampshire
- Andres Institute of Art Symposium 2014:Carving out Loud. We are One, sculpture, Brrokline New Hampshire
- Zimsculpt 2006 onwards
- African Excellence in Art Exhibit – Oslo, Norway 2004
- Charles Sumner School Museum Exhibit, Washington D.C. 2004
- In Praise of Women International Exhibit – Richmond, Canada 2004
- In Praise Of Women Intentional Exhibit – South Africa 2003
- Zolla Gallery, Heidelberg – Germany 1999
- National Gallery Harare – Zimbabwe 1994

== Awards ==
- "Comforting" - Sculpture, Women in the Arts Award Honoree, Orlando Florida 2019
- "The Fisherman" – Best Sculptor on Show, National Gallery of Art, Zimbabwe 2005
- "Woman Artist of the Year" – 2004
