= Nesbert Mukomberanwa =

Zimbabwean sculptor (born 1969)

- Born: Nesbert Mukomberanwa; Ruwa, Zimbabwe
- Occupation: Sculpture
- Relatives: Anderson Mukomberanwa (cousin); Ennica Mukomberanwa (cousin); Grace Mukomberanwa (aunt); Lawrence Mukomberanwa (cousin); Netsai Mukomberanwa (cousin); Nicholas Mukomberanwa(uncle); Taguma Mukomberanwa (cousin); Tendai Mukomberanwa (cousin)

Nesbert Mukomberanwa (born 1969) is a Zimbabwean sculptor.

== Background ==
Born in Buhera, Mukomberanwa began to study sculpture with his uncle in 1987; by 1989 he had struck out on his own, establishing a workshop in Chitungwiza. Here he worked for nearly a decade, before relocating in 1998 to the village of Dema to the south. Mukomberanwa currently serves as a teacher, providing a "Village Gallery" for young local sculptors to exhibit their work.

Mukomberanwa's work has been shown at exhibitions in the Netherlands, Switzerland, Great Britain, and the United States. The British Museum has examples of his work in its permanent collection.

Mukomberanwa is a member of the Mukomberanwa family of sculptors. He is the nephew of Nicholas Mukomberanwa and Grace Mukomberanwa who were mentors and trained him in his craft. He is the cousin of sculptors Anderson, Ennica, Taguma, Tendai Mukomberanwa, Netsai, and Lawrence Mukomberanwa.
