= Netsai Mukomberanwa =

Zimbabwean sculptor

- Born: Netsai Mukomberanwa; Ruwa, Zimbabwe
- Occupations: Sculpture and Teacher
- Parents: Nicholas Mukomberanwa (father); Grace Mukomberanwa (mother)
- Relatives: Anderson Mukomberanwa (brother); Ennica Mukomberanwa (sister); Lawrence Mukomberanwa (brother); Nesbert Mukomberanwa (cousin); Taguma Mukomberanwa (brother); Tendai Mukomberanwa (brother)

Netsai Mukomberanwa is an acclaimed Zimbabwean sculptor.

== Background ==
She is a second generation Shona art sculptor that works with stone as a medium. She spends afternoons producing her work at the family farm in Ruwa; her primary job is as a school teacher.

She is a member of the famed Mukomberanwa family of artists. She is a daughter of first generation Shona art Sculptors Nicholas Mukomberanwa and Grace Mukomberanwa. She is the sister of sculptors Anderson, Ennica, Taguma, Tendai Mukomberanwa and Lawrence Mukomberanwa, and the cousin of Nesbert Mukomberanwa.

From her early childhood on, she was exposed to the art of stone sculpting due to her father, Nicholas.

== Awards ==
- Young Women Sculpture Awards - Merit Award 2004
- Harare Visual Arts Sector steering committee Member

== See also ==
- Portia Zvavahera
- Amanda Shingirai Mushate
- Grace Nyahangare
- Shamilla Aasha
