= Darlington Dzikamai Chigumbu =

Zimbabwean politician

Darlington Dzikamai Chigumbu is a Zimbabwean politician. He has been a CCC member of the National Assembly of Zimbabwe representing the constituency of Budiriro South in Harare Province since the 2023 Zimbabwean general election.

== Political career ==
In 2023 Chigumbu was declared the CCC candidate for the newly created Budiririo South constituency for the upcoming 2023 Zimbabwean general election. He campaigned on four main issues; the creation of a constituency scholarship fund; creating a world-class sporting complex; obtaining a garbage truck to reduce dumping and; combating drugs.

Chigumbu was elected with 81.17% of the vote.
