= Budiriro (constituency) =

Constituency of the Parliament of Zimbabwe

- Former National Assembly constituency for the Parliament of Zimbabwe
- Budiriro is 13 on this map of Zimbabwe
- Province: Harare
- Region: Harare
- Major settlements: Budiriro

Former constituency
- Abolished: 2023
- Replaced by: Budiriro North; Budiriro South

Budiriro was a constituency represented in the National Assembly of the Parliament of Zimbabwe. The seat was dissolved for the 2023 Zimbabwean general election into Budiriro North and Budiriro South.

== Members ==
Election	Parliament	Name	Party	Ref.
2018	9th Parliament of Zimbabwe	Costa Machingauta	MDC Alliance	

== See also ==
- List of Zimbabwean parliamentary constituencies
