= Nyanhongo =

Nyanhongo is a surname. Notable people with the surname include:

- Agnes Nyanhongo (born 1960), Zimbabwean sculptor
- Gedion Nyanhongo (born 1967), Zimbabwean sculptor
- Hubert Nyanhongo (fl. 2008–2018), Zimbabwean politician
