= Epworth North =

Zimbabwean constituency

- National Assembly constituency for the Parliament of Zimbabwe
- District: Epworth
- Province: Harare
- Electorate: 38,244 (2023)

Current constituency
- Created: 2023
- Number of members: 1
- Party: Citizens Coalition for Change
- Member: Togarepi Zivai Mhetu
- Created from: Epworth

Epworth North is a constituency represented in the National Assembly of the Parliament of Zimbabwe. It was established through the 2023 delimitation report and was first contested at the 2023 general election. The current MP is Togarepi Zivai Mhetu of the Citizens Coalition for Change since the 2023 election.

== Members ==
Election	Name	Party
2023	Togarepi Zivai Mhetu	Citizens Coalition for Change

== See also ==
- List of Zimbabwean parliamentary constituencies
