= Nicholas Mukomberanwa =

Zimbabwean sculptor and art teacher

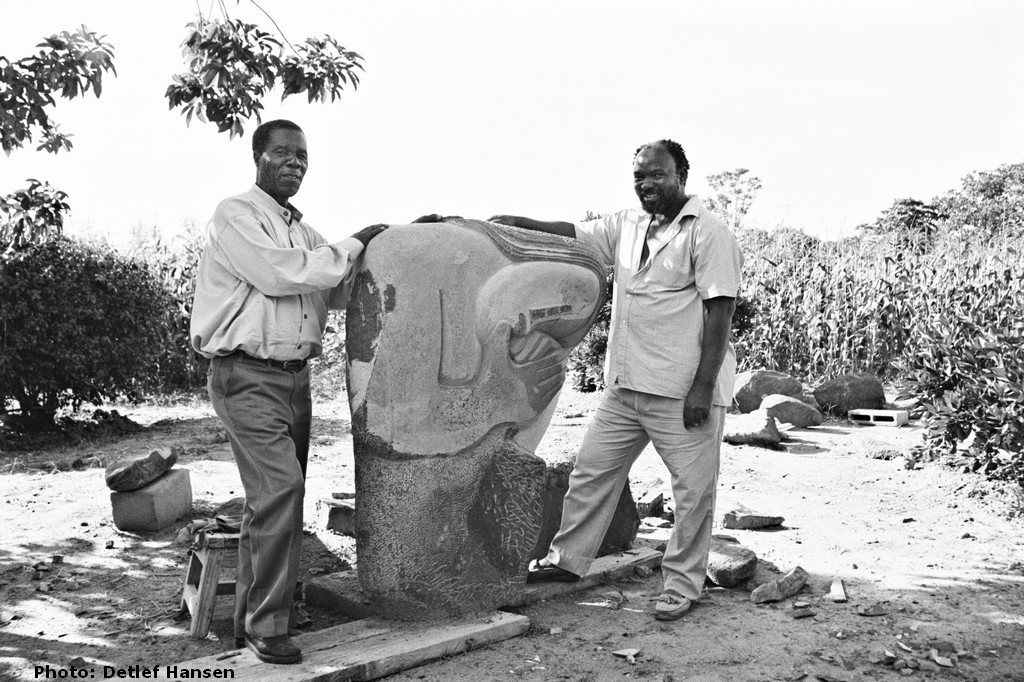
- Nicholas Mukomberanwa
- Born: Obert Matafi; 1940; Buhera District, Rhodesia (today Zimbabwe)
- Died: 12 November 2002; Harare, Zimbabwe
- Education: Serima Mission, Masvingo Province and informally
- Known for: Sculpture
- Movement: Shona sculpture
- Spouse: Grace Mukomberanwa
- Children: Anderson Mukomberanwa, Ennica Mukomberanwa, Lawrence Mukomberanwa, Netsai Mukomberanwa, Taguma Mukomberanwa, Tendai Mukomberanwa
- Relatives: Nesbert Mukomberanwa (nephew)
- Awards: Winner, Nedlaw award, 1989

Nicholas Mukomberanwa (1940–12 November 2002), was a Zimbabwean sculptor and art teacher. He was among the most famous protégés of the Workshop School at the National Gallery of Zimbabwe. He was a mentor to the Mukomberanwa Family of sculptors. Mukomberanwa married his first wife, sculptor Grace, in 1965 and they had eight children. In 1965, he decided to end his career with the police to become a sculptor full-time. He continued to hone his skills over the following decade, developing one of the most distinctive personal styles found in his generation of Zimbabwean stone sculptors. The gambit paid off, and by the late 1970s and in the 1980s his work was being shown in many venues. His work has been exhibited in galleries around the world. He also became mentor to many artists in Zimbabwe, including his children Anderson Mukomberanwa, Ennica Mukomberanwa, Lawrence Mukomberanwa, Netsai Mukomberanwa, Taguma Mukomberanwa, Tendai Mukomberanwa and nephew, Nesbert Mukomberanwa who are also sculptors. He remains one of Zimbabwe's most famous artists.

== Early life and career ==
Mukomberanwa was born in the Buhera District of the Manicaland Province in 1940. He was named Obert Matafi, first-born son of his father Marakia's second wife Chihute, who died when Obert was two years old. From then on he was brought up by Marakia's first wife Maiguru. In 1958 at the St Benedicts Mission, Obert was baptised Nicholas and took the surname Mukomberanwa in honour of an ancestor.

Nicholas attended Zvishavani Primary School while his father worked at the nearby King Asbestos Mines. Art was not taught at school but by the time he was 15 Nicholas had produced his first sculpture in clay. By the age of 17 he was accepted at St Benedicts Mission, Chiendambuya, where he was recognised as skilled in painting and drawing and so was encouraged to move to the Serima Mission, Masvingo Province. There, Father Groeber encouraged sculpting and the craft of woodcarving and Nicholas encountered a blend of traditional Christian iconography and tribal African pieces.

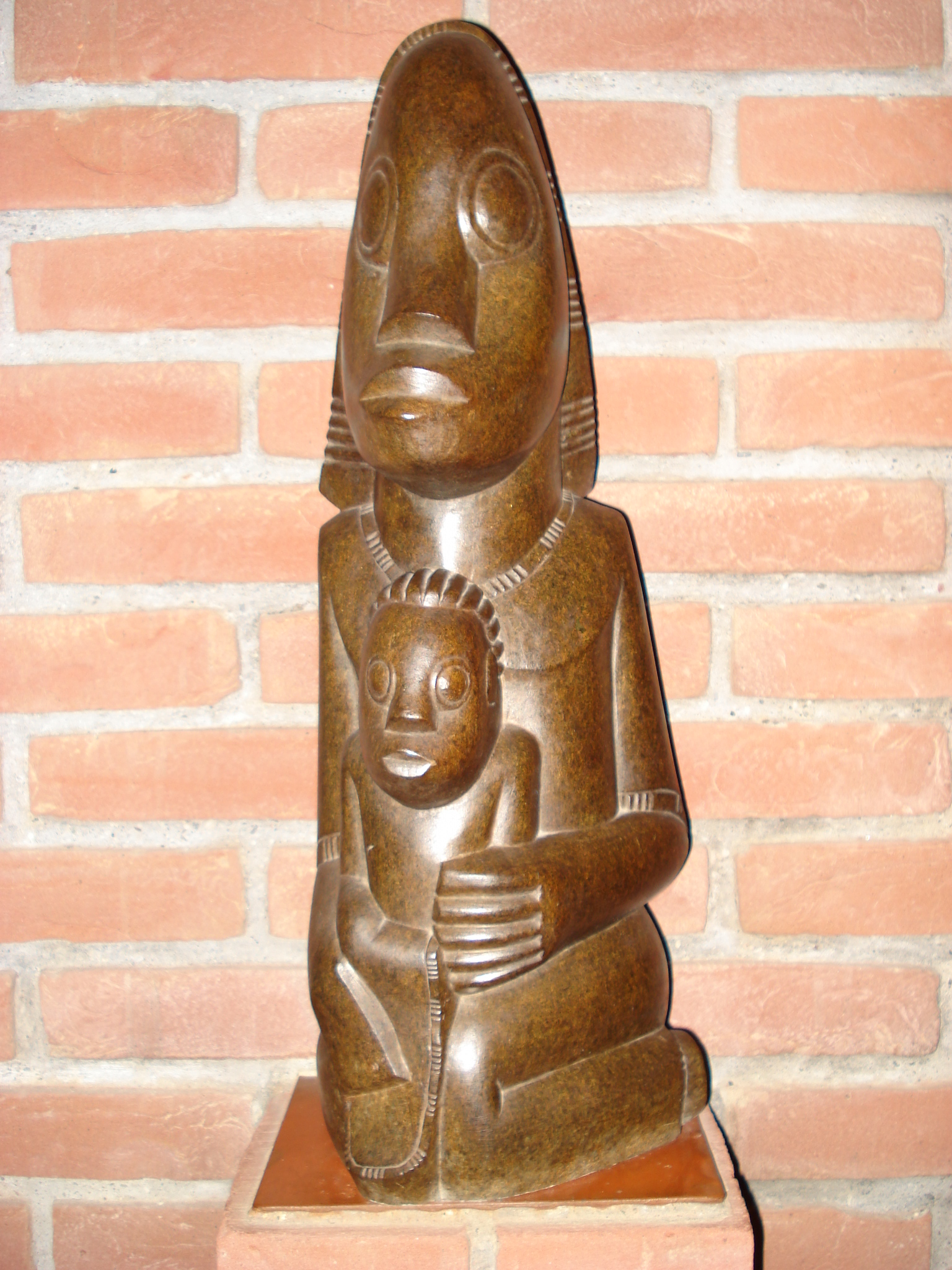
An early Mukomberanwa carving showing the architectural influence of his training at Serima

Mukomberanwa was heavily influenced by the drawing, patterning, and carving lessons he learned from Groeber and the school's art teacher Cornelius Manguma. Mukomberanwa produced his first art works while at the school, producing six carvings for the Serima church. These include four cement angels in the tower, as well as two wood angels for the chapel.

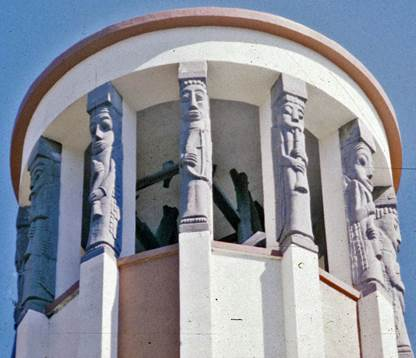
Nicholas Mukomberanwa's first carvings. Serima Mission, 1959.

However, after a productive year at Serima, Mukomberanwa was expelled and moved to Salisbury (now Harare), taking a job as an officer in the British South Africa Police, where he remained for 15 years (1962–76). Even though his year at Serima was brief, his style was decisively shaped by his experiences there. His work was typically architectural, carved on only one side. Additionally, in his later geometric phases, he relied heavily on patterning learned at Serima.

Nicholas was still drawing for recreation and in 1962 he met Frank McEwen, then director of the National Gallery of Rhodesia (today the National Gallery of Zimbabwe), who encouraged him to take up stone carving. McEwen provided materials and training in a workshop in the Gallery basement, and soon Mukomberanwa was sculpting in his free time, producing his first stone piece The Thief McEwan helped get this piece and others international exposure abroad.

In 1968, Ulli Beier wrote

"Mukomberanwa’s sculpture is full of ideas and inventions, he has a great variety of attitudes and expressions and he likes to portray whole clusters of intertwined figures. He works in many different stones, continuously using textures and colours. The mood of his sculptures is always meditative, sometimes religious, and they are of a very high quality."

In 1969, Frank McEwen's wife Mary (née McFadden) established Vukutu, a sculptural farm near Nyanga, and in 1970 McEwen arranged for Nicholas to have a sabbatical from the police and spend 6 months there working on large pieces of black Penhalonga serpentine that would form part of the Musée Rodin exhibition. He eventually quit his job in the police to become a sculpture full-time

=== Early exhibitions ===
International exhibitions, in which Nicholas's sculptures were included, up until Frank McEwen's resignation as museum director in 1973, are listed below.

- 1964 International Art Exhibition, Lusaka
- 1965 New Arts from Rhodesia, Commonwealth Arts Festival, Royal Festival Hall, London
- 1968 Rhodesian Sculpture, toured South Africa
- 1969 Contemporary African Arts, Camden Arts Centre, London.
- 1970 Sculptures Contemporaine de Vukutu, Musée d’Art Moderne de la Ville de Paris
- 1971 Sculpture Contemporaine des Shonas d’Afrique, Musée Rodin, Paris
- 1972 Shona sculptures of Rhodesia, ICA Gallery, London

=== The Shona sculpture movement ===
Mukomberanwa was a central part of the early "Shona sculpture Movement". During the early years of growth, the nascent "Shona sculpture movement" was described as an art renaissance, an art phenomenon and a miracle. Critics and collectors could not understand how an art genre had developed with such vigour, spontaneity and originality in an area of Africa which had none of the great sculptural heritage of West Africa and had previously been described in terms of the visual arts as artistically barren.

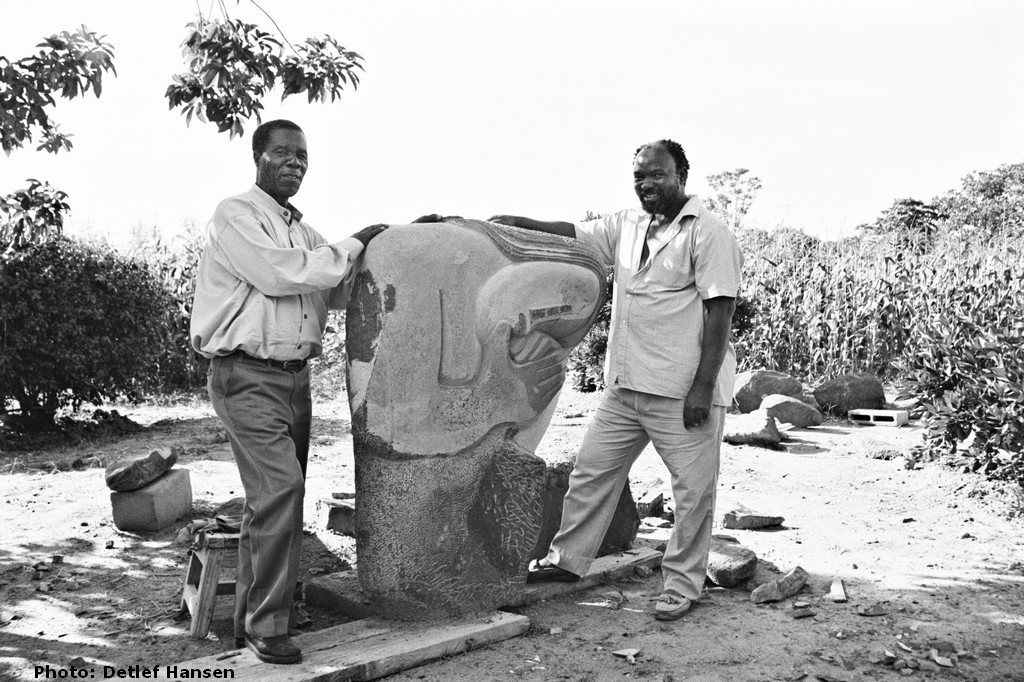
Nicholas Mukomberanwa (r) with Joram Mariga

In the period 1965–1980, Nicholas's work, together with the works from other leading members from the Workshop School such as Sylvester Mubayi, Joram Mariga and Joseph Ndandarika were an integral part of the Shona Sculpture Movement. The "first generation" of new Shona sculptors were given international exposure despite the sanctions being imposed on Southern Rhodesia thanks to McEwen. Three of the early works three by Nicholas and the works of many of the first generation artists, are now in the McEwen bequest to the British Museum.

== Later life and career ==
In 1976, Nicholas resigned from the police to become a professional sculptor and by 1977 had a sold-out show of works at the Goodman Gallery in Johannesburg. In 1978, he arranged to buy a farm near Ruwa from Roy Guthrie, founder of the Chapungu Sculpture Park, and it was there that he settled with his wives (he had married his second wife Betty in 1976) and family. Using his earnings from his works, Mukomberanwa invested in farmland and was considered by many to be one of the ablest farmers in Zimbabwe. As his agricultural holdings expanded, he increasingly relied on his family members to complete laborious sculpting tasks, such as polishing.

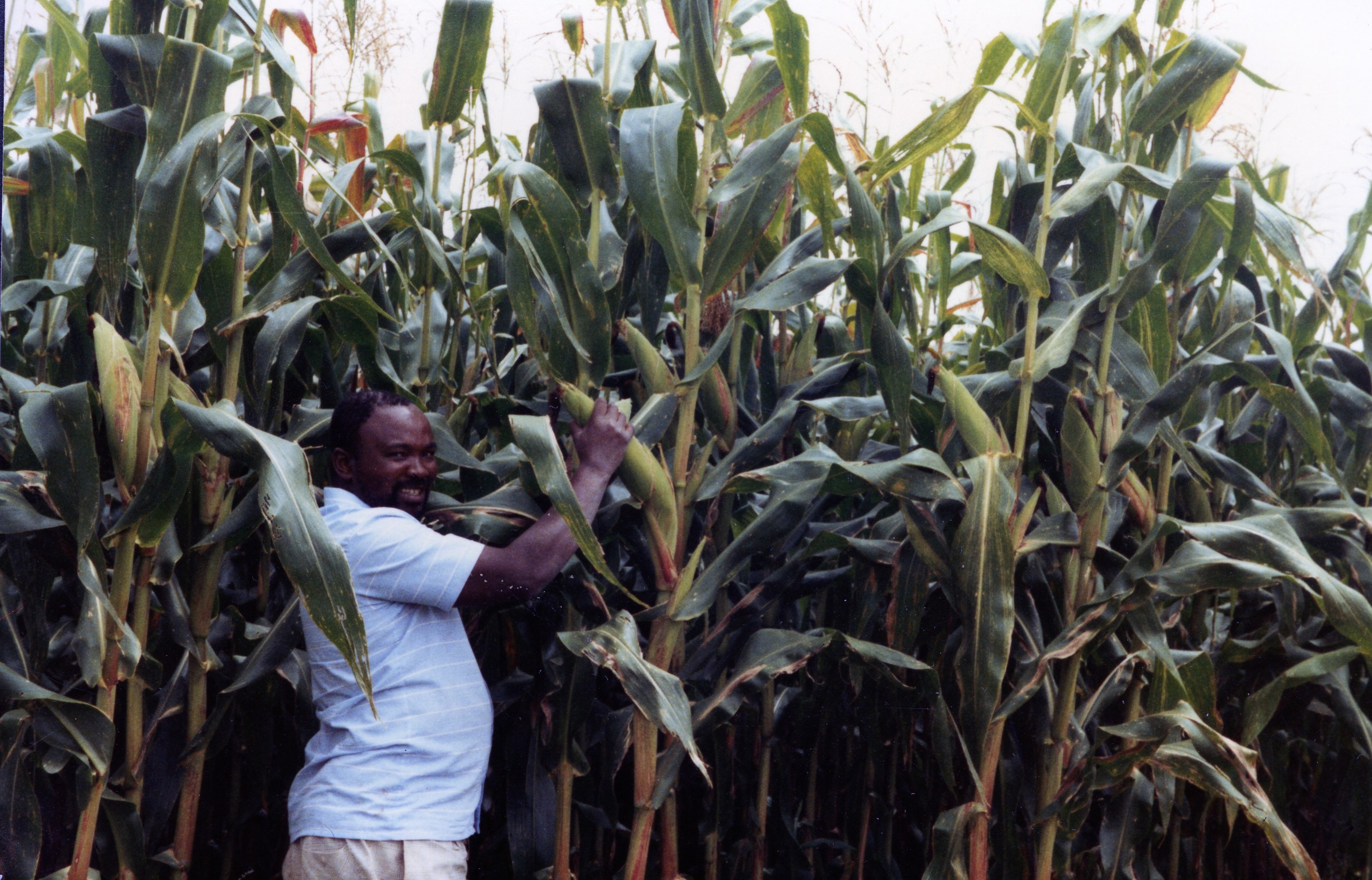
Nicholas Mukomberanwa on his farm with a typically successful maize crop

=== Style ===
Mukomberanwa's sculptures showed human forms at various levels of abstraction and sometimes depicted animals, birds or spiritual feelings; most were highly polished, although in a few cases he would contrast smooth sections with areas of great roughness. He worked primarily in hard stone, using local materials such as opal stone, cobalt stone and other serpentines, especially a local variant called springstone found at Tengenenge.

Celia Winter-Irving said of Nicholas

"Unlike many other sculptors, Mukomberanwa speaks from personal experience rather than recounting what he has heard or been told. To him beliefs must be personally held rather than customarily observed. Over the years, his work has shown a sense of the increasing spiritual support which has sustained his art."

=== Exhibitions ===
In June–July 1993, Nicholas was joined by his four sons Anderson (born 1968), Malachia (born 1970), Tendai (born 1974) and Lawrence (born 1976) in presenting an exhibition of their sculpture at the Chapungu Sculpture Park, Harare.

By the end of the millennium, Mukomberanwa's reputation was further enhanced by the many exhibitions in which his work was displayed. Some of these are listed below. Later in his career, he slowed his production of art to enjoy farming and cattle ranching on the Ruwa farm. He produced less, creating more personal sculptures and slowing down the pace of his life considerably.

- 1974 African Artist Festival, Chicago, USA
- 1978 God's Men and beasts, Goodman Gallery, Johannesburg, South Africa
- 1981 Art in Action Festival, Waterperry, UK
- 1981 Art from Africa, Commonwealth Institute, London, UK
- 1983 Stein Skulpturen aus Zimbabwe, Frankfurt, Germany
- 1984 Shona Sculpture, Pulchri Studio, The Hague, Netherlands
- 1984 Plazzotta Studio, Chelsea, London, UK
- 1985 Kunstschaetze aus Zimbabwe, Frankfurt, Germany
- 1985 Zimbabwean Stone Sculpture, Kresge Art Museum, Michigan State University, USA
- 1985 and 1987 Contemporary Stone Sculpture, Irving Sculpture Gallery, Sydney, Australia
- 1986 Africa Centre, London, London, UK
- 1986-8 Soul in Stone, Perth, Sydney, Melbourne and Canberra, Australia
- 1986 Moderne Skulpturen aus Zimbabwe, Vienna, Austria
- 1987 Contemporary Stone Sculpture from Zimbabwe, Barbican Centre, London, UK
- 1987 Zimbabwe Heritage, UNESCO, Paris, France
- 1987 African Influence Gallery, Boston, USA
- 1989 Zimbabwe op de Berg, Foundation Beelden op de Berg, Wageningen, The Netherlands
- 1989 Shona Sculpture, Robert Steele Gallery, Adelaide, Australia
- 1990 Honorable Mention, African Sculpture Exhibition, Venice Biennale, Italy
- 1990 Contemporary African Artists - Changing Tradition, Studio Museum New York City, USA
- 1990 Contemporary Stone Carving from Zimbabwe, Yorkshire Sculpture Park, UK
- 1990 One-Person Exhibition, Auckland, New Zealand
- 1990 Stone Sculpture from Zimbabwe, Millesgården Museum, Stockholm, Sweden
- 1992 Shona Sculpture International Symposium, Tokyo, Japan
- 1993 Nicholas and Family, Chapungu Sculpture Park, Harare, Zimbabwe
- 2000 Chapungu: Custom and Legend – A Culture in Stone, Kew Gardens, UK
- 2004 Retrospective, Zuva Gallery, Scottsdale, Arizona, USA

=== Exhibition pieces ===
Some of Mukomberanwa's exhibition pieces, such as The Greedy One (1985) and The Corrupting Power of Money (1985), have toured worldwide; for example to the Yorkshire Sculpture Park in 1990, where the works on display included examples from all the artists who had contributed to the 1971 Musée Rodin exhibition. The catalogue "Chapungu: Culture and Legend – A Culture in Stone" for the exhibition at Kew Gardens in 2000 depicts Nicholas's sculptures My Experience (Springstone, 1992) on p. 58-59, Man in a Trance (Springstone, 1987) on p. 92-93, Women of Wisdom (Opal stone, 1987) on p. 102-103 and The Corrupting Power of Money (Limestone, 1985) on p. 114-115.

=== International exhibitions (institutions holding Nicholas’s work) ===
Mukomberanwa's works are in the collections are at the National Gallery of Zimbabwe in Zimbabwe as well as the Museum of Modern Art, New York; the Field Museum of Natural History, Chicago, the Indianapolis Museum of Art and the British Museum. The Atlanta Airport's Zimbabwean sculpture Exhibit, "A Tradition in Stone" in Atlanta Georgia holds Nzuzu the Water Spirit (green serpentine stone).

== Accolades and awards ==
- In 1989 Nicholas was the overall winner in the annual Nedlaw / Baringa exhibition at the National Gallery of Zimbabwe for his piece "Street Beggar" and was chosen with Tapfuma Gutsa and Henry Munyaradzi to represent Zimbabwe in the New York exhibition "Contemporary African Artists - Changing Tradition".
- In 1986 Prime Minister, Robert Mugabe, bestowed on Nicholas a special award for his contribution to the visual arts in Zimbabwe.
- In 1983, Nicholas's works, called The Chief, was depicted on a Zimbabwean stamp issued to commemorate Commonwealth Day on 14 March 1983. It formed the $1 value in a set completed with works by Henry Munyaradzi, Joseph Ndandarika and John Takawira.

== Influence on other sculptors ==
In 2000, Mukomberanwa gave a filmed interview with Jonathan Zilberg in which he gave an account of his work, including his early training at the Serima mission.

Mukomberanwa died suddenly on 12 November 2002. All of his children became sculptors: his sons Anderson, Malachia, Tendai, Lawrence, and Taguma; and his daughters Netsai and Ennica. Another son, his eighth child, had tragically been drowned. Nicholas was also the uncle and teacher of Nesbert Mukomberanwa and mentor to African-American sculptor M. Scott Johnson. An appropriate quote from eldest son Anderson may serve as Nicholas's memorial

.... a sage, a sculptor, a father to me, a father-figure to many, many sculptors working in stone in Zimbabwe. Although gone, he remains with us because his wisdom guides the sculptures we make, and the actions we take.
