= Kambuzuma (constituency) =

Constituency of the Parliament of Zimbabwe

- Former National Assembly constituency for the Parliament of Zimbabwe
- Province: Harare
- Region: Harare
- Major settlements: Kambuzuma

Former constituency
- Abolished: 2023
- Replaced by: Kuwadzana East, Kuwadzana West

Kambuzuma was a constituency represented in the National Assembly of the Parliament of Zimbabwe. The seat was dissolved for the 2023 Zimbabwean general election into Kuwadzana East and Kuwadzana West.

== Members ==
Election	Name	Party
2018	Willias Madzimure	MDC Alliance
2022 by-election	Willias Madzimure	CCC

== See also ==
- List of Zimbabwean parliamentary constituencies
