= Grace Mukomberanwa =

Zimbabwean sculptor

- Born: Grace Mukomberanwa; Zimbabwe
- Occupation: Sculpture
- Spouse: Nicholas Mukomberanwa (husband)
- Relatives: Anderson Mukomberanwa (son); Ennica Mukomberanwa (daughter); Lawrence Mukomberanwa (son); Nesbert Mukomberanwa (nephew); Netsai Mukomberanwa (daughter); Taguma Mukomberanwa (son); Tendai Mukomberanwa (son)

Grace Mukomberanwa (born 1944) is a Zimbabwean sculptor.

== Background ==
Mukomberanwa is a first-generation soapstone sculptor of Shona art. She was the wife of renowned first generation artist Nicholas Mukomberanwa. They both trained in soapstone sculptor and then trained their children in the same craft. She was one of the leading female sculptors in Zimbabwe. Her work has been exhibited in galleries around the world.

She is a member of the Mukomberanwa family, who are renowned sculptors. Mukomberanwa was the wife of Nicholas Mukomberanwa. She was the mother of sons Anderson, Lawrence Mukomberanwa, Tendai, Taguma, daughters Netsai, and Ennica Mukomberanwa, and the aunt of Nesbert Mukomberanwa, all of whom are sculptors.
