= Lawrence Mukomberanwa =

Zimbabwean sculptor (born 1976)

- Born: Lawrence Mukomberanwa; Ruwa, Zimbabwe
- Occupations: Sculpture and Pilot
- Parents: Nicholas Mukomberanwa (father); Grace Mukomberanwa (mother)
- Relatives: Anderson Mukomberanwa (brother); Ennica Mukomberanwa (sister); Nesbert Mukomberanwa (cousin); Netsai Mukomberanwa (sister); Taguma Mukomberanwa (brother); Tendai Mukomberanwa (brother)

Lawrence Mukomberanwa (born 1976) is a Zimbabwean sculptor and pilot.

The son of Nicholas Mukomberanwa, Lawrence (sometimes spelled Laurence) worked with his father from his early childhood days. He continued sculpting whilst training to be a commercial pilot. He worked in the field for some years before turning to sculpture full-time. His works have been featured in a number of European exhibitions.

== Career ==
He started out his career as an airplane pilot but then quit to engage in the family craft. Lawrence Mukomberanwa, the son to sculptor Nicholas, says he has no regrets after he recently quit his professional job as a pilot to follow in the footsteps of his dad. Laurence's subject matter deals with contrasts and opposites. He is concerned with the disparity of power between poverty and wealth.

Mukomberanwa is a member of the Mukomberanwa family of sculptors. He is the son of first generation Shona art sculptors Grace Mukomberanwa and Nicholas Mukomberanwa. Mukomberanwa is the brother of Anderson, Tendai, Taguma, Netsai, and Ennica Mukomberanwa, and the cousin of Nesbert Mukomberanwa, all of whom are sculptors.

== Accolades and exhibits ==
- Resident Artist, "Master Sculptors of Zimbabwe and their Works" - Barcelona
- Group exhibition “Encompass” at the Cape Gallery - 2005
