= List of Zimbabwean provinces by population =

Harare Province, which includes the city of Harare, is the most populous of Zimbabwe's ten provinces, with over two million inhabitants in 2012. Manicaland Province and Midlands Province are the second and third most populous provinces, respectively. Seven of the ten provinces have a population larger than one million. Only three, Bulawayo, Matabeleland North and Matabeleland South are the least populous provinces. According to 2012 census data, Bulawayo is the least populous province, with around 650,000 inhabitants, though the city/provincial government disputes these statistics, arguing that they are politically motivated. Bulawayo produced its own municipal statistics showing a population 1.2 million. Depending on which data is accepted, either Bulawayo or Matabeleland South is the country's least populous province.

== List by current population ==
Rank	Province	Census population, 2012	% of the total population, 2012
1	Harare	2,123,132	16.26
2	Manicaland	1,752,698	13.42
3	Midlands	1,614,941	12.36
4	Mashonaland West	1,501,656	11.50
5	Masvingo	1,485,090	11.37
6	Mashonaland East	1,344,955	10.30
7	Mashonaland Central	1,152,520	8.82
8	Matabeleland North	749,017	5.73
9	Matabeleland South	683,893	5.24
10	Bulawayo	653,337 (or 1,200,337)	5.00 (or 9.19)
—	Zimbabwe total	13,061,239	—

== Historical population data ==
=== Since independence ===
Population history of Zimbabwean provinces
Province	2012 population	% of total population, 2012	% change, 2002–2012	2002 population	% of total population, 2002	% change, 1992–2002	1992 population	% of total population, 1992	% change, 1982–1992	1982 population	% of total population, 1982
Harare	▲2,123,132	▼16.26	+11.97	▲1,896,134	▲16.30	+28.22	1,478,810	14.21	—	—	—
Manicaland	▲1,752,698	▼13.42	+11.71	▲1,568,930	▼13.49	+2.03	▲1,537,676	▲14.78	+39.89	1,099,202	14.57
Midlands	▲1,614,941	▼12.36	+10.31	▲1,463,993	▲12.59	+12.42	▲1,302,214	▼12.52	+19.26	1,091,844	14.47
Mashonaland West	▲1,501,656	▲11.50	+22.62	▲1,224,670	▼10.53	+9.65	▲1,116,928	▼10.74	+30.03	858,962	11.38
Masvingo	▲1,485,090	▲11.37	+12.47	▲1,320,438	▼11.35	+8.07	▲1,221,845	▼11.75	+18.43	1,031,697	13.67
Mashonaland East	▲1,344,955	▲10.30	+19.30	▲1,127,413	▼9.69	+9.10	▼1,033,336	▼9.93	–30.93	1,495,984	19.82
Mashonaland Central	▲1,152,520	▲8.82	+15.78	▲995,427	▲8.56	+16.11	▲857,318	▲8.24	+52.17	563,407	7.47
Matabeleland North	▲749,017	▼5.73	+6.25	▲704,948	▼6.06	+9.98	▼640,957	▼6.17	–27.60	885,339	11.73
Matabeleland South	▲683,893	▼5.24	+4.72	▲653,054	▼5.61	+10.36	▲591,747	▼5.69	+13.88	519,606	6.89
Bulawayo	▼653,337	▼5.00	–3.45	▲676,650	▼5.82	+8.97	620,936	5.97	—	—	—
Zimbabwe total	▲13,061,239	—	+12.29	▲11,631,657	—	+11.82	▲10,401,767	—	+37.84	7,546,041	—
