= Anderson Mukomberanwa =

Zimbabwean artist and engineer

- Born: 9 February 1968; Ruwa, Zimbabwe
- Died: 2003 (aged 34–35)
- Occupations: Sculptor and engineer
- Spouse: Nyarai Gloriah
- Children: NICHOLAS TAYANANISWA(son); ABIGAIL TANAKA (daughter)
- Parents: Nicholas Mukomberanwa (father); Grace Mukomberanwa (mother)
- Relatives: Ennica Mukomberanwa (sister); Lawrence Mukomberanwa (brother); Nesbert Mukomberanwa (brother); Netsai Mukomberanwa (sister); Taguma Mukomberanwa (brother)

Anderson Mukomberanwa (9 February 1968 – 2003) was a Zimbabwean artist and engineer known primarily for his stone sculpture.

Mukomberanwa began his art career by studying with his father, working with hard stones native to the region. Later in his career, he took up printmaking, becoming interested in etching and woodblock printing. He was also a painter. He had his own style of art that incorporated humor. Anderson obtained a B.Tech degree from Harare Polytechnic College in 1993. There, he decided to go into art rather than pursue his profession as a civil engineer Anderson died from cancer on 9 March 2003.

He was a member of Zimbabwe's acclaimed Mukomberanwa family of sculptors. He is the son of Nicholas Mukomberanwa, he was the brother of second-generation sculptors Taguma, Lawrence, Ennica, and Netsai Mukomberanwa, and the cousin of Nesbert Mukomberanwa.
