= Budiriro North =

Zimbabwean constituency

- National Assembly constituency for the Parliament of Zimbabwe
- District: Harare
- Province: Harare
- Electorate: 38,340 (2023)

Current constituency
- Created: 2023
- Number of members: 1
- Party: Citizens Coalition for Change
- Member: Susan Matsunga
- Created from: Budiriro

Budiriro North is a constituency represented in the National Assembly of the Parliament of Zimbabwe. It was established through the 2023 delimitation report and first contested at the 2023 general election. Its current MP since the 2023 election is Susan Matsunga of the Citizens Coalition for Change.

== Members ==
Election	Name	Party
2023	Susan Matsunga	Citizens Coalition for Change

== Election results ==
2023 General Election: Budiriro North
Party	Candidate	Votes	%	±%
CCC	Susan Matsunga	18,135	72.2	N/A
ZANU–PF	Simbarashe Gomwe	4,760	18.9	N/A
Independent	Kennedy Bizaliel	2,020	8.0	N/A
Independent	Simbarashe Mupundu	208	0.8	N/A
Majority		13,375	53.3	N/A
CCC win (new seat)				

== See also ==
- List of Zimbabwean parliamentary constituencies
