= Zimbabwe Sculpture: a Tradition in Stone =

Sculpture exhibition at Hartsfield-Jackson Atlanta International Airport

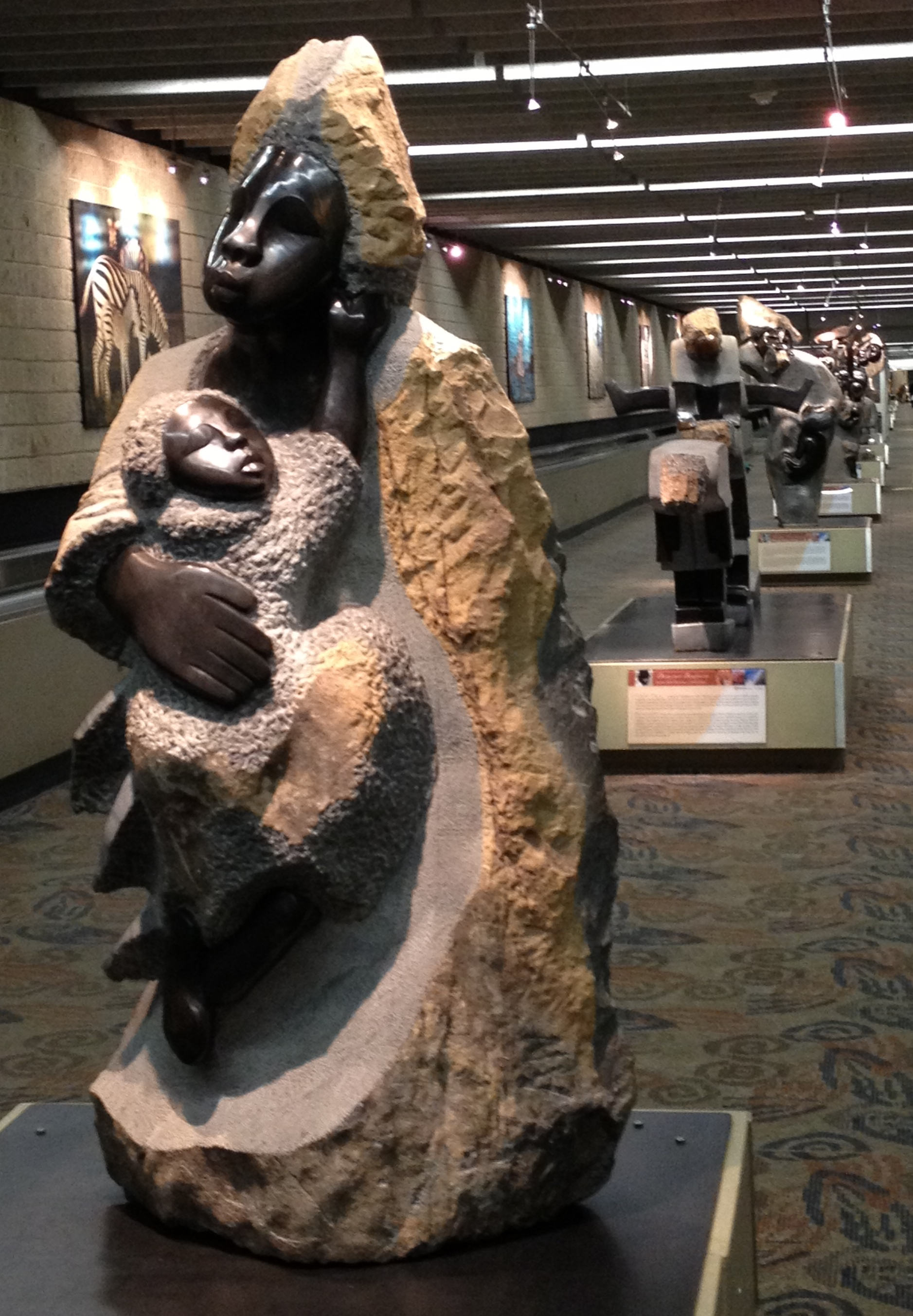
Agnes Nyanhogo - Welcome Baby. Zimbabwe sculpture: a tradition in stone at Atlanta airport between concourses T and A

Zimbabwe Sculpture: a Tradition in Stone is a permanent exhibit of sculpture at Hartsfield-Jackson Atlanta International Airport. It is sponsored by the city's Aviation Arts program. It features sculptures by some of Zimbabwe's best known sculptors such as Agnes Nyanhongo, Gedion Nyanhongo, Norbert Shamuyarira, Lameck Bonjisi, Edronce Rukodzi, Sylvester Mubayi, Joe Mutasa, Nicholas Mukomberanwa, Gladman Zinyeka, Tapfuma Gutsa, and Amos Supuni.
