= Epworth (constituency) =

Constituency of the Parliament of Zimbabwe

- Former National Assembly constituency for the Parliament of Zimbabwe
- Province: Harare
- Region: Epworth

Former constituency
- Abolished: 2023
- Replaced by: Epworth North, Epworth South

Epworth was a constituency represented in the National Assembly of the Parliament of Zimbabwe. The seat was dissolved for the 2023 Zimbabwean general election into Epworth North and Epworth South.

== Members ==
Election	Name	Party
2008	Elias Jembere	MDC–T
2013	Amos Midzi	ZANU–PF
2015 by-election	Zalerah Makari	ZANU–PF
2018	Earthrage Kureva	MDC Alliance
2022 by-election	Zalerah Makari	ZANU–PF

== Election results ==
2018 general election: Epworth
Candidate	Party	Votes	%	+/–
Earthrage Kureva	MDC Alliance	26,082	45.49	-
Kudakwashe Damson	ZANU–PF	16,149	28.17	-
Zalerah Hazvineyi Makari	Independent	10,745	18.74	-
Damian Mukanhairi	MDC-T	2,676	4.67	-
Felix Gosha	Independent	462	0.81	-
Kudzai Shekelton Charakupa	People's Rainbow Coalition	419	0.73	-
Calista Kahanda	CODE	249	0.43	-
Memory Kasvosve	National Constitutional Assembly	180	0.31	-
Christopher Kamukosi	Zimbabwe Democratic Union	151	0.26	-
Tichaona Muroyiwa	Zimbabwe Partnership for Prosperity	111	0.19	-
Lambert Mukaadira	FreeZim Congress	110	0.19	-
Total		57,334	100.00	–
Valid votes		57,334	98.44	
Invalid/blank votes		907	1.56	
Total votes		58,241	100.00	
Registered voters/turnout		72,019	80.87	
Majority		9,933	17.05	-
MDC Alliance gain from ZANU–PF				
Source: ZEC

2022 by-election: Epworth
Candidate	Party	Votes	%	+/–
Zalerah Hazvineyi Makari	ZANU–PF	10,246	51.73	+23.56
Earthrage Kureva	CCC	8,283	41.82	New
Togarepi Zivai Mhetu	MDC Alliance	745	3.76	-41.73
Innocent Hazvina	Independent	441	2.23	New
Richard Musiyadzanikwa	Labour, Economists and African Democrats	92	0.46	New
Total		19,807	100.00	–
Majority		1,963	9.91	-7.41
ZANU–PF gain from MDC Alliance				
Source: ZEC

== See also ==
- List of Zimbabwean parliamentary constituencies
