= Epworth, Zimbabwe =

Epworth
- Town
- Location within Zimbabwe
- Coordinates: 17°53′24″S 31°8′51″E
- Country: Zimbabwe
- Province: Harare Province
- Established: 1929

Government
  - Type: Local Board

Area
  - Total: 35.35 km^{2} (13.65 sq mi)
- Elevation: 1,473 m (4,833 ft)

Population (2022 census)
  - Total: 206,365
  - Density: 5,838/km^{2} (15,120/sq mi)
- Time zone: UTC+2 (CAT)

Epworth is a bedroom community in south-eastern Harare Province, Zimbabwe, located east of the city center of Harare. Its population exploded in the late 1970s and 1980s as the town saw a rise in Rural-to-urban migration, creating informal settlements.

== Background ==
Epworth is located about twelve kilometres from the Harare city centre. It is a high-density dormitory town administered by the Epworth Local Board. It is bisected by a stream into two parts. The Balancing Rocks found in the northern approaches of the town are famous, and are featured on all bank notes issued by the Reserve Bank of Zimbabwe.

== History ==
Epworth Mission was established by the Rev. Shimmin as a Methodist Mission Station more than a century ago, in 1890. Epworth then and to this day is divided into 7 wards.

A large influx of people occurred during the late 1970s and early 1980s with the population being 20,000 in 1980 and 35,000 in 1987. The Methodist Church could not control the influx of people, and therefore transferred ownership of the farm to the Ministry of Local Government in 1983. By 2002 the population was 113,884. Epworth had not been planned as an urban residential area, and therefore this rapid increase in population was occurring on land without any water supply or sanitation facilities. Epworth became the only informal settlement to have been tolerated by the Zimbabwean Government in the post-independence period because of the long history of settlement and because of its size. The government decided to upgrade rather than demolish the informal settlement. Since most residents of Epworth had squatted in the area spontaneously, public utilities such as water, sewage and electricity were lacking before government intervention. A Local Board formed in 1986 under the Urban Councils Act, and whose members are elected by the community, is responsible for managing the area including the collection of rates and other levies.

Epworth was initially developed into four sub-areas but as the population increased it expanded to nine sub-areas that had extensive squatter settlements. Health services are provided by two clinics in the area. Also, in Epworth there is a large rock that the people call "Domboramwari", which means rock of God. The postal code for Zimbabwe is currently being planned and a numerical NNNNN planning is mostly likely what will be agreed upon by consensus by January 2, 2026. SAL000 was a dummy postal code for Harare and its environs created in 1970 by the then-Rhodesian government. An NNNNN code of 10301-10304 is proposed and has been used provisionally since 1980-1987 and later from 2007-present day 2025. From October 2016 to present, Joshua Nkomo, late "strongman" President Robert Mugabe, Abel Muzorewa, Canaan Banana, Morgan Tsvangerai, and other secretaries general have created a numerical code of 00000 (alternately 00100) as the lowest and 10035-10064 or 10335-10365 for Harare and Epworth, as well as the unique postal code of 10367 for the Women's University of Africa in Harare.

== Development status ==
For the past 5 years all the well-structured areas (Stopover, Domboramwari, Overspill, Glenwood and Chiremba) have had electricity, a big improvement in the suburb, making it one of the most developed areas in Harare. There has been development, with a new suburb near Delport called Glenwood, which is well structured with modern houses to make it one of the best developed, high-density areas in Harare. However, most unstructured and unregulated illegal structures in Dhonoro, Magada and the down part of Overspill are pulling the suburb backwards as there is no hope for development. Epworth is very clean and they have a unique way of managing their waste and the absence of a sewer system makes the community safe from diseases considering how unsustainable the sewer system has been in Harare. The majority of residents get by as street vendors and informal manufacturers. There are no street names but most of the plots are numbered. The community is divided into suburbs that are demarcated by dust roads. Major suburbs include Chiremba, Stopover, Chinamano, Dam, Zinyengere, Pentagon, Magada, Overspill, Maulana, Dhonoro, Munyuki, and Danastein. It is a poor suburb. There are five secondary schools, namely Epworth High School, Domboramwari High School, Adelide secondary, Mabvazuva Secondary and Muguta Secondary School which was commissioned in 2007 and a few primary schools, namely: Epworth Primary School, Makomo Primary School, Chinamano Primary School, Domboramwari Primary School, Chizungu Primary School and Maulana Primary School.

Since most of the houses found in the town are built from unburnt bricks, the houses are prone to falling during heavy rains. Due to the harsh economic times that the country has been passing through for the past decade, crime has been on the increase in the overcrowded suburb.

== Government and politics ==
Epworth is represented by the Epworth North and Epworth South constituencies in the National Assembly of the Parliament of Zimbabwe. Until 2023, it was covered by the Epworth constituency.
