= Budiriro =

Suburb of Harare in Zimbabwe

Coordinates: 17°54′S 30°56′E

Budiriro is a high-density suburb in the southwestern parts of Harare in Zimbabwe. It is the largest suburb by population in Harare and in Zimbabwe with about 90,000 people. There are about 30,000 houses but only two clinics and five elementary schools.

== Recent Developments ==
Budiriro is the site of a housing project for low-income earners with almost 2,000 homes sold in April 2018 in CABS Budiriro 5 Area.

== History ==
In 2008, Budiriro had the highest number of cholera outbreaks. accounting for 50% of the reported cases in Zimbabwe. Another common disease in Budiriro is typhoid.

In late 2016, most of the suburb was affected by flash flooding.

== Politics ==
Budiriro is represented by two constituencies in the National Assembly of the Parliament of Zimbabwe: Budiriro North and Budiriro South.

== Notable Places and People ==
- OK Budiriro 5
- TM Budiriro 1
- Mickey Job Shops
- Current Shopping Centre
