= Mufakose =

Totem of the Zumba Shona people

Coordinates: 17°52′S 30°55′E

Mufakose is the totem of the Zumba Shona people of central Zimbabwe who settled in the Mazoe valley in the early nineteenth century. Three brothers of Mhofu, Totem Shayachimwe Mukombami, Nyakudya Chiweshe and Gutsa left their ancestral lands under Nyashanu in Buhera after domestic issues. They settled in the Harare-Mazoe area.

He took Hwata name as a nickname as he had long legs and walked like a Hwata bird (Secretary bird).

Mufakose's praise name was adopted after the brothers' children fought amongst themselves for land and women. If one won he would also have lost having killed a brother. hence Mufakose, losing either way and Mutenhesanwa (those who fight amongst themselves).

All male descendants of Hwata dynasty are called Mhofu, Hwata, Mufakose or Shava, while female descendants are called Chihera.

A suburb in Harare, Zimbabwe, called Mufakose, is named after the Hwata dynasty. It is also known as Mufombi.

Mufakose is also the name of a constituency of the Parliament of Zimbabwe and the suburb including that constituency. Modern Hwata people from Guruve became a diaspora. The Mundowa family (2011) and many others trace their lineage to Hwata Shayachimwe Mukombamwi. The Chiripanyanga clan, whose families include the Marufu family, Chikuya, Muringai and Dzengeza families are split between Guruve and Chiweshe. They trace their lineage to Bungu, son of Shayachimwe. Muringayi/Muringai clan is also found in Mhondoro under chief Nyamweda (shava mufakose).

== See also ==
- Hwata (Senatorial constituency)
