= Kuwadzana West =

Zimbabwean constituency

- National Assembly constituency for the Parliament of Zimbabwe
- District: Harare
- Province: Harare
- Electorate: 37,927 (2023)
- Major settlements: Kuwadzana

Current constituency
- Created: 2023
- Number of members: 1
- Party: Citizens Coalition for Change
- Member: Johnson Matambo
- Created from: Kuwadzana

Kuwadzana West is a constituency represented in the National Assembly of the Parliament of Zimbabwe. It was established through the 2023 delimitation report and was first contested at the 2023 general election. The current MP is Johnson Matambo of the Citizens Coalition for Change since the 2023 election.

== Members ==
Election	Name	Party
2023	Johnson Matambo	Citizens Coalition for Change

== See also ==
- List of Zimbabwean parliamentary constituencies
