= Randolph Nesbitt =

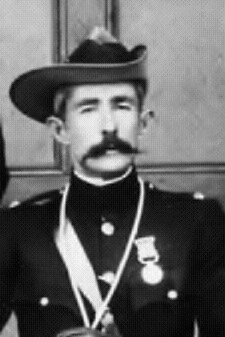
- Born: 20 September 1867
- Died: 23 July 1956 (aged 88); Cape Town, South Africa
- Military career
- Allegiance: United Kingdom
- Branch: Rhodesian Forces
- Rank: Major
- Units: Mashonaland Mounted Police
- Conflicts: Mashona Rebellion
- Awards: Victoria Cross

Randolph Cosby Nesbitt VC (20 September 1867 – 23 July 1956) was a South African-born Rhodesian recipient of the Victoria Cross, the highest British and Commonwealth award.

Nesbitt was born at Queenstown, Cape Colony, South Africa. He was a captain in the Mashonaland Mounted Police, Rhodesian Forces during the Mashona Rebellion. On 19 June 1896 near Salisbury, Rhodesia (now Zimbabwe), Captain Nesbitt led a patrol consisting of only 13 men to rescue miners at the Alice Mine in Mazoe Valley, who were surrounded by hordes of rebels. Blakiston, Nesbitt, Routledge and Pascoe were the four main leaders and instigators of the rescue. Captain Nesbitt's patrol fought their way through the enemy, rescuing the beleaguered party (including three women), transporting them back to Salisbury in spite of heavy fighting in which three of the small party were killed and five wounded.

In 1909, Nesbitt became a Native Commissioner for the British South Africa Police (a paramilitary Rhodesian force). He retired in 1928 after 40 years of service with the Rhodesian police and civil service, returning to South Africa on account of his wife's health. Nesbitt died in South Africa on 23 July 1956. His remains were cremated at Cape Town.

Nesbitt's medal was kept in the Museum in Salisbury until independence. It was loaned out, once a year, to Blakiston School, when the event of the Mazoe Patrol was commemorated.
