= Shawasha =

Shawasha was a chiefdom in Zimbabwe. It was founded by the Chinamora Dynasty, who settled there around 1744. It became a part of the British Mashonaland protectorate in 1889. Its royal line continued to 1916. It was used as a farm for many years. After independence many people have settled in the land. There 2 schools in this land which are Nesta Junior School and Wonders Christian Junior College
