= Gedion Nyanhongo =

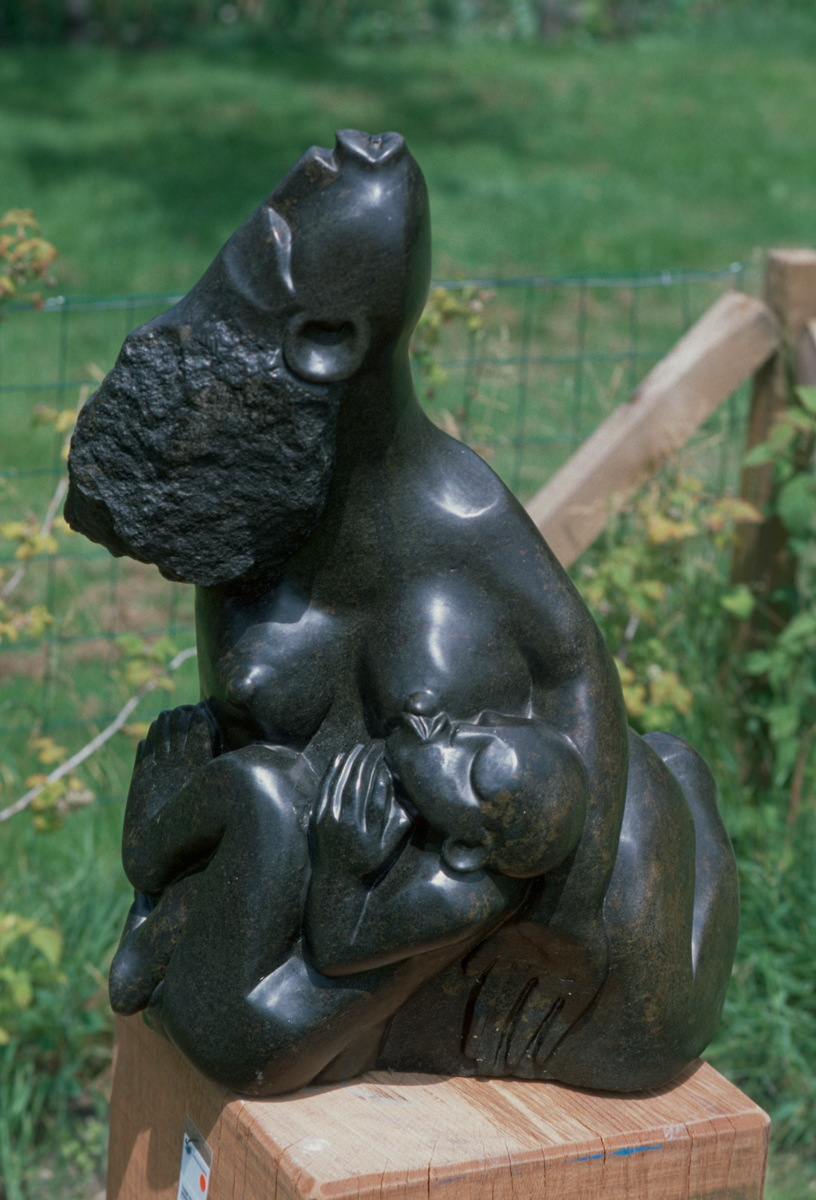
- Born: 1967 (age 57–58); Harare
- Citizenship: Zimbabwe
- Occupation: Sculptor

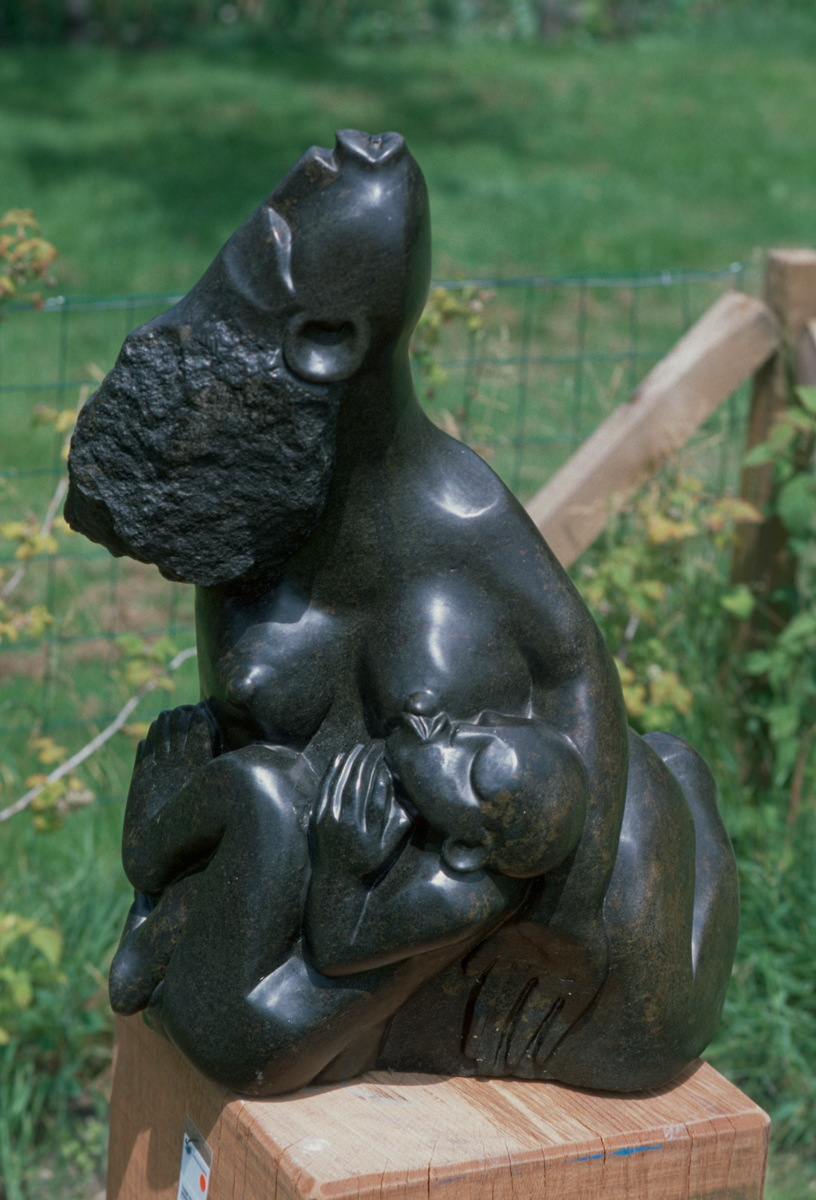
Mother and baby, sculpture by Gedion Nyanhongo, 1995

Stone sculptor Gedion Nyanhongo was born into an artistic family on 22 December 1967 in Nyanga, Zimbabwe. He was influenced from a young age by his father, Claud Nyanhongo, a prominent artist among the "first generation" sculptors (the pioneers of the Shona Sculpture movement that began in the late 1950s). "I used to watch my father sculpt when I grew up, and although I was young, I remember loving it and knowing that it was what I wanted to do." After an apprenticeship with the internationally acclaimed sculptor Joseph Ndandarika (a friend of his father), Gedion embarked on a solo career in 1988. His debut exhibition was in 1989 at the Mabwe Gallery in Harare, Zimbabwe. Gedion has since exhibited his works in solo and group exhibitions at numerous venues around the world, including: England, France, Germany, Holland, Hong Kong, South Africa, U.S.A, and Zimbabwe. Two of his works are featured in a collection on permanent display at the Hartsfield-Jackson Atlanta International Airport, and a Zebra in the Phoenix Zoo.

Nyanhongo's sister Agnes is also a sculptor.
