= Kuwadzana East =

Zimbabwean constituency

- National Assembly constituency for the Parliament of Zimbabwe
- District: Harare
- Province: Harare
- Electorate: 35,543 (2023)
- Major settlements: Kuwadzana

Current constituency
- Created: 2008
- Number of members: 1
- Party: Citizens Coalition for Change
- Member: Chalton Hwende
- Created from: Kuwadzana

Kuwadzana East is a constituency represented in the National Assembly of the Parliament of Zimbabwe. It was established in 2008 and was first contested at the 2008 general election. The current MP is Chalton Hwende of the Citizens Coalition for Change since the 2018 election.

== Members ==
Election	Name	Party
2018	Chalton Hwende	MDC Alliance
2023	Chalton Hwende	Citizens Coalition for Change

== See also ==
- List of Zimbabwean parliamentary constituencies
