= Taguma Mukomberanwa =

Zimbabwean sculptor (born 1981)

- Born: Taguma Mukomberanwa; 19 February 1981 (age 45); Ruwa, Zimbabwe
- Occupation: Sculpture
- Parent(s): Nicholas Mukomberanwa (father); Grace (mother)
- Relatives: Anderson Mukomberanwa (brother); Ennica Mukomberanwa (sister); Lawrence Mukomberanwa (brother); Nesbert Mukomberanwa (brother); Netsai Mukomberanwa (sister)

Taguma Mukomberanwa (born 1981) is a Zimbabwean sculptor. The son of Nicholas Mukomberanwa, he is the brother of sculptors Anderson, Lawrence, Ennica, and Netsai Mukomberanwa, and the cousin of Nesbert Mukomberanwa. Taguma's work was included in a 2017 exhibition exploring modern art in Africa in at Kunsthalle ConARTz in Markt Indersdorf, Germany.
