= Kuwadzana =

Residential suburb in Harare, Zimbabwe

Coordinates: 17°50′S 30°56′E

Kuwadzana is a residential suburb in Harare, Zimbabwe. It was originally known as Parkridge Fontainebleau. It lies on the city's western border, just south of the main Harare-Bulawayo road. In the 1980s, Kuwadzana was selected for slum upgrading on the site and services model. As of 2012, the population was 26,926.

== Government and politics ==
Kuwadzana is represented by the Kuwadzana East and Kuwadzana West constituencies in the National Assembly of the Parliament of Zimbabwe.
