= Ruwa =

- town
- Location within Zimbabwe
- Coordinates (17.9027°S 31.2369°E): 17.9027°S 31.2369°E
- Country: Zimbabwe
- Province: Mashonaland East Province

Area
  - Total: 40.4 km^{2} (15.6 sq mi)

Population (2022 census)
  - Total: 94,083
  - Density: 2,330/km^{2} (6,030/sq mi)
- Climate: Cwb

Ruwa is a town in Mashonaland East Province, Zimbabwe, situated 23 km south-east of the capital Harare on the main Harare-Mutare highway and railway line. Ruwa falls within the Harare metropolitan Province and was officially established as a Growth Point in 1986 in terms of the Acts, Income Tax Chapter and Sales Tax Chapter. It was granted the Local board status through a warrant in 1990.

== History ==
In the 1890s commercial farming began in the area and a small trading post Ruwa was established to serve as an administrative and trading centre for the mixed farming community. Its first local authority, the Bromley-Ruwa Rural Council (BRRC) was set up in 1950.

After Zimbabwe's Independence, the Bromley-Ruwa Rural Council (BRRC) was renamed as the Goromonzi Rural District Council. In the decades following independence, Ruwa developed rapidly becoming a popular residential area with low, medium and high density spaces for people moving out of Harare. Officially, Ruwa was established as a growth point from 1986 to 1990 in terms of the Acts, Income Tax Chapter (23:06) and Sales Tax Chapter (23:08). In 1990, it was declared an urban area under the administration of the Ruwa Local Board (RLB) which was set up in September of the same year. It officially gained town status in 2008.

== Local services ==
The Ruwa Rehabilitation Centre just outside the town was established in 1981 for the rehabilitation of disabled ex-combatants.

The Ruwa Scout Park which hosted the Central African Jamboree in 1959 is located nearby.

Ruwa falls within the Seke constituency and in the 2005 parliamentary election elected Phineas Chihota with a majority of over 6000 votes.

== Suburbs ==
- Damofalls Park
- Timire Park
- Ruwa Central
- Mabvazuva Estate
- Chipukutu Park
- Dabuka Village
- Old Windsor Park
- Boulder Estate
- Zimre Park
- Riverside Park
- Erasmus Park
- Country Club Estate
- Springvale
- Fairview
- Timire Park
- Cranbrooke
- Silverbrooke
- Rockview
- Sebassa Park
- Adelaide

== UFO sighting ==
In 1994, the Ariel School in Ruwa was reported to be the site of a sighting of a landed UFO. Some of the approximately 62 students involved in the sighting also reported that a "strange being" communicated with them. According to the students, interviewed in groups by John E. Mack and MUFON Coordinator Cynthia Hind, they were warned to take care of the environment.
