= Harare Province =

Coordinates: 17°51′S 31°03′E

Harare Metropolitan Province: Guta reHarare (Shona); Isabelo sedolobho laseHarare (Northern Ndebele)
- Province
- Location of Harare Province in Zimbabwe
- Country: Zimbabwe
- Established: 1997
- Capital: Harare
- Districts: Districts: Harare; Chitungwiza; Epworth

Government
  - Senators: Miriam Katumba (CCC); Kudakwashe Matibiri (CCC); Tambudzai Kunaka (CCC); Moses Manyengawana (CCC); Omega Sipani Hungwe (ZANU-PF)
  - Minister for Provincial Affairs and Devolution: Charles Tawengwa
  - Secretary for Provincial Affairs and Devolution: Cosmas Chiringa

Area
  - Total: 872 km^{2} (337 sq mi)
- Elevation: 1,490 m (4,890 ft)
- Highest elevation: 1,540 m (5,050 ft)

Population (2022 census)
  - Total: 2,427,209
  - Rank: 1st
  - Density: 2,780/km^{2} (7,210/sq mi)
- Time zone: UTC+2 (Central African Time)
- ISO 3166 code: ZW-HA
- HDI (2021): 0.665
- Website: harareprovince.co.zw

Harare Metropolitan Province (/həˈrɑːreɪ/) is a province in northeastern Zimbabwe that comprises Harare, the country's capital and largest city, and three other municipalities, Chitungwiza, Epworth and Ruwa. At independence in 1980, it was originally part of Mashonaland Province which in 1983 was divided into three large provinces, Mashonaland Central, Mashonaland East, and Mashonaland West - at this point, the city of Harare became part of Mashonaland East. In 1997, along with Bulawayo, it became a metropolitan province, along with the then two nearby urban settlements. Harare Metropolitan Province is divided into four local government areas - a city council, a municipality and two local boards.

Harare Province has an area of 872 square kilometres (337 mi^{2}), equal to 0.22% of the total area of Zimbabwe. It is the second-smallest in area of the country's provinces, after the city-province of Bulawayo. As of the 2022 census, the province has a population of 2,427,209, of whom 1,849,600 live in Harare proper, 371,244 in Chitungwiza, and the remaining 206,365 in Epworth. In total, Harare Province is home to 16.26% of Zimbabwe's population, making it the country's most populous province.

Historical population
Year	Pop.	±%
1992	1,485,615	—
2002	1,896,134	+27.6%
2012	2,123,132	+12.0%
2022	2,427,231	+14.3%

The province is Zimbabwe's leading political, financial, commercial, and communications centre, as well as a trade centre for tobacco, maize, cotton, and citrus fruits. Manufacturing, including textiles, steel, and chemicals, is also economically significant, as is gold mining. The province is home to several universities, a number of leading professional sports teams, and many historical sites and tourist attractions.

== Etymology ==
Harare Province is named after the city of Harare, which in turn took its name from a black township in the city now known as Mbare. Originally, the name "Harare" applied to a village near the Harare Kopje led by the Shona chief Neharawa, whose name meant "he who does not sleep." The city of Harare, previously named Salisbury, was renamed on 18 April 1982, the second anniversary of Zimbabwean independence. When Harare and two nearby towns were separated from Mashonaland East Province in 1997, the new province took the same name.

== Geography ==
Harare Province covers an area of 872 square kilometres (337 mi^{2}), making it the second-smallest province in Zimbabwe, after Bulawayo Metropolitan Province. It is situated in the northeastern part of the country, in the Mashonaland region. It is bordered to the north by Mashonaland Central Province, to the west by Mashonaland West Province, and to the east and south by Mashonaland East Province. The City of Harare proper covers most of the province's area, while Chitungwiza, Epworth and Ruwa take up smaller areas of the province, both bordering Mashonaland East.

=== Climate ===
Under the Köppen climate classification, Harare Province has a subtropical highland climate (Köppen Cwb), an oceanic climate variety.

Climate data for Harare (1961–1990, extremes 1897–present)
Month	Jan	Feb	Mar	Apr	May	Jun	Jul	Aug	Sep	Oct	Nov	Dec	Year
Record high °C (°F)	33.9 (93.0)	35.0 (95.0)	32.3 (90.1)	32.0 (89.6)	30.0 (86.0)	27.7 (81.9)	28.8 (83.8)	31.0 (87.8)	35.0 (95.0)	36.7 (98.1)	35.3 (95.5)	33.5 (92.3)	36.7 (98.1)
Mean daily maximum °C (°F)	26.2 (79.2)	26.0 (78.8)	26.2 (79.2)	25.6 (78.1)	23.8 (74.8)	21.8 (71.2)	21.6 (70.9)	24.1 (75.4)	28.4 (83.1)	28.8 (83.8)	27.6 (81.7)	26.3 (79.3)	25.5 (77.9)
Daily mean °C (°F)	21.0 (69.8)	20.7 (69.3)	20.3 (68.5)	18.8 (65.8)	16.1 (61.0)	13.7 (56.7)	13.4 (56.1)	15.5 (59.9)	18.6 (65.5)	20.8 (69.4)	21.2 (70.2)	20.9 (69.6)	18.4 (65.1)
Mean daily minimum °C (°F)	15.8 (60.4)	15.7 (60.3)	14.5 (58.1)	12.5 (54.5)	9.3 (48.7)	6.8 (44.2)	6.5 (43.7)	8.5 (47.3)	11.7 (53.1)	14.5 (58.1)	15.5 (59.9)	15.8 (60.4)	12.3 (54.1)
Record low °C (°F)	9.6 (49.3)	8.0 (46.4)	7.5 (45.5)	4.7 (40.5)	2.8 (37.0)	0.1 (32.2)	0.1 (32.2)	1.1 (34.0)	4.1 (39.4)	5.1 (41.2)	6.1 (43.0)	10.0 (50.0)	0.1 (32.2)
Average precipitation mm (inches)	190.8 (7.51)	176.3 (6.94)	99.1 (3.90)	37.2 (1.46)	7.4 (0.29)	1.8 (0.07)	2.3 (0.09)	2.9 (0.11)	6.5 (0.26)	40.4 (1.59)	93.2 (3.67)	182.7 (7.19)	840.6 (33.09)
Average precipitation days	17	14	10	5	2	1	0	1	1	5	10	16	82
Average relative humidity (%)	76	77	72	67	62	60	55	50	45	48	63	73	62
Mean monthly sunshine hours	217.0	190.4	232.5	249.0	269.7	264.0	279.0	300.7	294.0	285.2	231.0	198.4	3,010.9
Mean daily sunshine hours	7.0	6.8	7.5	8.3	8.7	8.8	9.0	9.7	9.8	9.2	7.7	6.4	8.2
Source 1: World Meteorological Organization, NOAA (sun and mean temperature, 1961–1990),
Source 2: Deutscher Wetterdienst (humidity, 1954–1975), Meteo Climat (record highs and lows)

== Government and politics ==
=== Provincial government ===
Harare Province is overseen by the Minister of State for Harare Province, a de facto governor who oversees provincial affairs and sits in the House of Assembly of the Parliament of Zimbabwe. The governor is appointed by the President of Zimbabwe and is not appointed to a set term. Historically, the governor held the title Governor of Harare, but the office has since been renamed to align with the 2013 Constitution of Zimbabwe, which does not allow for provincial governors.

=== Local government areas ===
Harare Province is divided into four local government areas: Harare City Council, Chitungwiza Municipality, Epworth Local Board and Ruwa Local Board.

=== National politics ===
Presidential election results
Year	ZANU–PF	MDC / MDC–T
2018	26.52% 204,710	71.12% 548,889
2013	38.85% 172,163	59.11% 261,925
2008	19.41% 61,215	72.01% 227,166
2002	24.38% 101,395	74.51% 309,832
1996	-	-
1990	-	-

Like each of Zimbabwe's ten provinces, Harare Province is represented in the Senate by six senators, three of whom must be women. Senators are not directly elected by voters, but are instead selected by party lists via a proportional representation system.

Harare Province is divided up into 30 constituencies, for which Members of Parliament are elected to the National Assembly, Zimbabwe's lower house of Parliament.

== See also ==
- List of Zimbabwean provinces by population
