= Derek Huggins =

Zimbabwean artist (1940–2021)

Derek Huggins (23 July 1940 – 19 July 2021) was a gallerist based in Zimbabwe. He was born in Kent, England and migrated to Rhodesia in the 1950s where he joined the police force, attaining the rank of Detective Inspector. He opened Gallery Delta in 1975 with his wife Helen Lieros for the promotion of contemporary painting. He managed the gallery up until his death in July 2021. Huggins was the founding director of the National Arts Council of Zimbabwe.

== Career ==
When Huggins and his wife started Gallery Delta, he was concurrently the chief executive of the National Arts Foundation from 1975 to 1988, and published Arts Rhodesia and Arts Zimbabwe. Between 1994 and 2002, he published Gallery, an art magazine to which he was a frequent contributor. Since the 1990s, Gallery Delta has been in the former home of the Rhodesian landscape artist Robert Paul (1906–1980). The space has been an incubator for two generations of Zimbabwean artists that include Lovemore Kambudzi, Arthur Azevedo, Luis Meque, Hilary Kashiri, George Churu, Tapfuma Gutsa, Marjorie Wallace, Gillian Resselli, Thakor Patel, Rashid Jogee, Helen Lieros, Berry Bickle, Gerry Dixon, Richard Jack, Albert Wachi, Masimba Hwati, Victor Nyakauru, Greg Shaw, Virginia Chihota, Tafadzwa Gwetai, Cosmos Shiridzinomwa, Stephen Williams, Shepherd Mahufe, Daryl Nero, Misheck Masamvu, Kate Raath, Portia Zvavahera, and Johnson Zuze.

Before Zimbabwe's independence, Huggins was the chief executive officer of Rhodesia's National Arts Foundation (1975–1985), and was instrumental in the institution's transformation into the National Arts Council of Zimbabwe through an Act of Parliament in 1985. He became the founding director of the Council until 1988, when he resigned to focus on his work at Gallery Delta.

== Writing ==
After a push from his friend, the writer Yvonne Vera, his only book of short stories, Stained Earth, was published in Harare in 2005 by Weaver Press. He also had work appear in Writing Still: New Stories from Zimbabwe (2003) and Short Writings from Bulawayo Vols I & II (2004, 2005).

== Publications ==
- Stained Earth (Weaver Press, 2005)
- Eleni Lierou/Helen Lieros Mural Paintings (2015)
