= Greenwood Park, Harare =

Park and neighbourhood in Harare, Zimbabwe

Greenwood Park is both a city park and a small urban neighbourhood located in the northeast section of Harare's central business district and is one of the early subdivisions which were created inside Harare, but which lay outside of the original, officially-planned City of Salisbury. Situated two kilometres north of Parliament, Greenwood Park overlaps with the larger and newer neighbourhood of Avenues and is usually considered to be a part of that more prominent locale. The area of Greenwood Park, and is best known for its eponymous park which covers much of the area.

== Features ==
Greenwood Park developed as a stable for the British South Africa Police, then on the edge of town, near Causeway, who would leave their horses and walk to the police headquarters. In time, the area was built out mostly between 1900 and 1940, with the Civic Centre occupying a large portion of the area and a portion of the remainder preserved as the eponymous park. Today, Greenwood Park, consists primarily of townhouses, plus a number of low- and medium-rise apartment, civic and commercial buildings. The architectureis generally typical of the early to mid twentieth century, in a variety of styles, especially mid-century and Classical Revival. Some of the apartment and flats have distinctive, well-crafted Art Deco designs. The area also contains a commercial stretch of stores on its southern side along Seventh Street. Nearby, just to the south of Greenwood Park, is the slightly older CBD and Causeway area.

The subdivision developed into a fairly busy area of businesses and services, with residents including professionals, civil servants, and new arrivals to the city. Several of the city's first flats sprang up in Greenwood Park. In the postwar era, many better off residents, left for the northern suburbs, leaving the area to be taken over by high rises and commercial interests, essentially becoming consumed within the city centre. In the segregated past, it was a white neighborhood, but by the 1980s, it had become an ethnically diverse mix of people and cultures, and, for a time, a local hub of student politics and partially a red light district as part of the larger Avenues, due to its affordable housing. Recent rising home prices and a growing affordable housing shortage, however, have made it somewhat more difficult for a number of the working class residents to remain in the area.

== Amenities ==
In the centre of town are Harare Gardens and Greenwood Park and a little further out the Botanical Gardens and Africa Unity Square. 20th century Harare was heavily influenced by the garden city movement and as a result most of the streets are lined with large and gracious trees, even in the centre of town, making for a pleasant urban environment in sharp contrast to other African cities such as, Kampala, Addis Ababa and Cairo.

== The park ==
Greenwood Park, which lends the area its name, lies on the edges of the downtown area is especially popular with young families and young professionals, especially as the area around the more well known, Harare Gardens has become less safe. The park offers rides, seat lifts, swings, play areas, kayaking and a recreation center, making it a popular family destination. Greenwood Park was started in 1964, by a group of Harare Round Table No. 1 members, and is an ongoing project which is still run by Harare 1, as both a community service and as a method of raising funds. The park is considered one of the city's best parks, due to its funding by private donors and organisations, rather than relying on the local council.

== Culture ==
The decline of the city's economy has led to a lack of investment in public services across the city, leading to congestion downtown that has led to many businesses moving to the wealthier northeast suburbs. As a result, rents have declined from their heyday in the 1990s. This has led to the partial revival of Greenwood Park and Avenues as an artistic and cultural centre led by the Delta Gallery on historic 110 Livingstone Avenue.

The birth modern contemporary painting in Harare was very slow, as there were few spaces for serious art study and appreciation and most African artists were stone sculptors, or wood carvers. Slowly, however, the established artists such as Marshall Baron, Robert Paul, Arthur Azevedo, Helen Lieros, Henry Thompson, Thakor Patel, Stephen Williams, Rashid Jogee, Simon Back, Berry Bickle, Richard Jack, Gerry Dixon and others began to be joined by a new generation of African artists at the end of the 1980s, with the encouragement of Christopher Till, the then Director of the National Gallery of Zimbabwe, the BAT workshop and Gallery Delta. They included Luis Meque, George Churu and Richard Witikani, in the 1990s they were joined by Shepherd Mahufe, Hilary Kashiri, Fasoni Sibanda, Ishmael Wilfred, James Jali, Hilary Kashiri and Lovemore Kambudzi, who emerged through the annual 'Young Artists' and group exhibitions.

The gallery's pioneering success in nurturing contemporary art, as well as the area's proximity to the National Gallery of Zimbabwe, has encouraged other alternative venues, featuring art exhibitions, theatre, poetry, literature and jazz, making it the city's leading alternative neighborhoods.

== Notable people or residents ==
Notable people from or associated with Greenwood Park/Avenues include:

- Berry Bickle – installation and conceptual artist
- Robert Paul – painter, founder of Robert Paul House
- Peter Jackson – architect
- Masimba Hwati – interdisciplinary artist
- Derek Huggins and Helen Lieros – visual artists, gallerists, art collectors and owners of Delta Gallery
- Hilary Kashiri – artist
- Shepherd Mahufe – artist and painter
- Portia Zvavahera – painter.
