= Shamilla Aasha =

Zimbabwean artist and teacher (born 1977)

- Born: 1977 (age 48–49); Hwange, Zimbabwe
- Education: Diploma in Textile Design, Bulawayo School of Art and Design
- Occupations: Artist and teacher of art and design
- Years active: 2007–present

Shamilla Aasha (born 1977) is a Zimbabwean artist and teacher of art and design. Her artworks, made with mixed media painting, textiles and found materials, address culture, traditional practice, identity, spirituality and women's social status in her community.

Since her solo exhibition in 2010, Aasha's artworks have been exhibited at the National Gallery of Zimbabwe in Bulawayo and Harare, Artissima in Turin, the Investec Cape Town Art Fair in Cape Town, and the RMB Latitudes Art Fair in Johannesburg.

== Early life and education ==
Aasha was born in 1977 in Hwange, Zimbabwe, and was raised and educated in Bulawayo. In 2000, she graduated with a Diploma in Textile Design from the Bulawayo School of Art and Design.

After many years of painting and mixed media, Aasha re-engaged with textiles in 2018 through her multi-cultural background as a Shona and Indian woman living in the Matabeleland region of Zimbabwe. She had a solo exhibition, Ties That Bind, in the same year at First Floor Gallery, where she merged traditional sari and java with new fabrics, sewing patterns, pages of old books and writing. Her artworks include weaving, tapestry, soft sculptures, found-object wall hangings and abstract embroideries.

Aasha has calls to these artworks as sacred objects where she uses sewing patterns, fabric and stitching to create new patterns from the old.

== Career ==
Aasha has been active in exhibitions locally, regionally and internationally since the late 2000s. In 2007, Aasha took part in the Woman of the Cloth and Stone exhibition at the Embassy of the United States of America in Zimbabwe, Harare. In 2009, she exhibited in Confrontation and Reconciliation at the National Gallery of Zimbabwe in Bulawayo. In 2010, she had the solo exhibition Calling of my Soul at the National Gallery of Zimbabwe in Bulawayo.

In 2018, she exhibited in the BUKA group exhibition at The Suttie Art Space in Aberdeen, the Harare Contemporary exhibition at Circle Art Gallery in Nairobi, and Ties That Bind at First Floor Gallery Harare.

In 2019, Aasha showcase in the Better Balance Women's Exhibition at the National Gallery of Zimbabwe in Harare. She also took part in the Nyika/Ilizwe/Nation Workshop, a Zimbabwe and South Africa collaborative project on the participation of women in land redistribution in Southern Africa.

== Selected exhibitions ==
Year	Exhibition	Venue / Location	Reference
2024	"To Those Who Came Before Me" (group)	First Floor Gallery Harare, Harare, Zimbabwe	
2023	"Tomorrows/Today" (solo)	Investec Cape Town Art Fair, Cape Town, South Africa	
2022	Artissima	Turin, Italy	
2021	"Breathing Time" (solo)	First Floor Gallery Harare, Victoria Falls, Zimbabwe	

== See also ==
- Portia Zvavahera
- Netsai Mukomberanwa
- Kudzanai Chiurai
- Grace Nyahangare
- Anne Zanele Mutema
