= Grace Nyahangare =

Zimbabwean contemporary visual artist

- Born: 1996; Harare, Zimbabwe
- Education: National Gallery School of Visual Arts and Design (Harare)
- Known for: Printmaking and photography
- Style: Dreamlike, surreal

Grace Nyahangare (born 1996) is a Zimbabwean painter who lives and works in Harare, Zimbabwe. Grace uses printmaking and photography in her work and mixes printer's ink with paint to create her paintings about memories, emotions and personal experience. In 2023 she became one of First Floor Gallery Harare artists after finishing her three month residency in 2022.

== Early life and education ==
Nyahangare was born in Harare, Zimbabwe in September 1996. She went to Girls High School in Harare, where she began her art career. In 2015, she joined the National Gallery School of Visual Arts and Design and studied visual Arts and developed an interest in Printmaking and Photography. In 2022 she completed a three-month residency at First Floor Gallery Harare and joined the gallery in 2023.

== Career ==
She started out her career by studying Visual Art in 2015 and later became interested in printmaking and photography, using photographs and memories to create monotype before developing them into paintings.

In 2023, Grace held her debut solo exhibition, Hatikanganwe Asi Tinopora at First Floor Gallery Harare. The exhibition was about her personal experiences of pain and growth. Follow the year 2024 she presented Methods of Flight with Amanda Shingirai Mushate at Southern Guild Los Angeles. In 2025, she had a solo presentation at the 1-54 Contemporary African Art Fair in London, presented by First Floor Gallery Harare. In the same year, 2025, Nyahangare's work was shown in Goya and Africa, a digital-first exhibition that launched during Cape Town Art Week.

== See also ==
- Amanda Shingirai Mushate
- Kudzanai Chiurai
- Netsai Mukomberanwa
- Portia Zvavahera
- Shamilla Aasha
