= Thakor Patel =

Indian-born Zimbabwean artist (b. 1932)

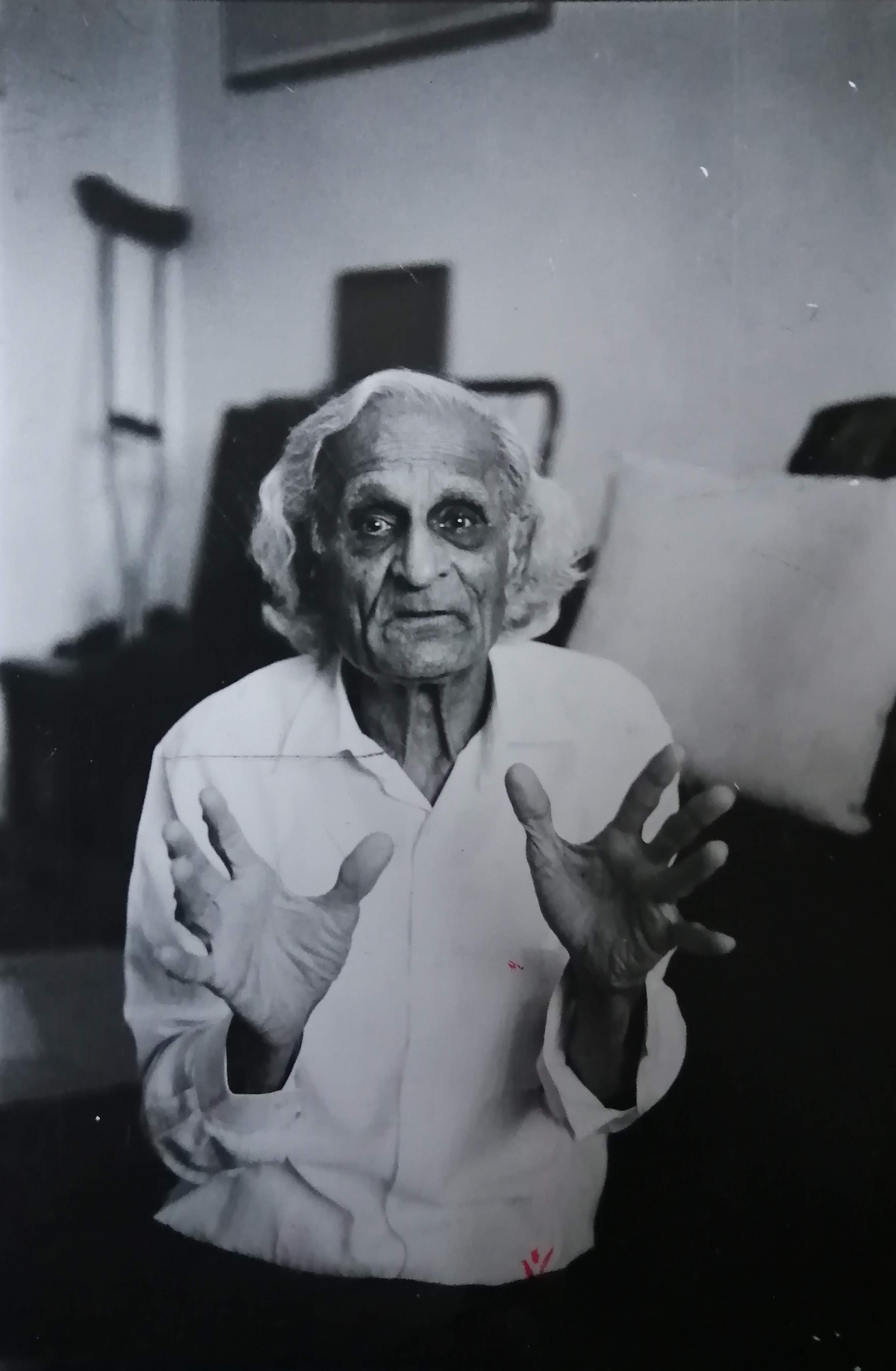
Photo of Thakor Patel, taken by Fabian Kaufmann Harare 2014

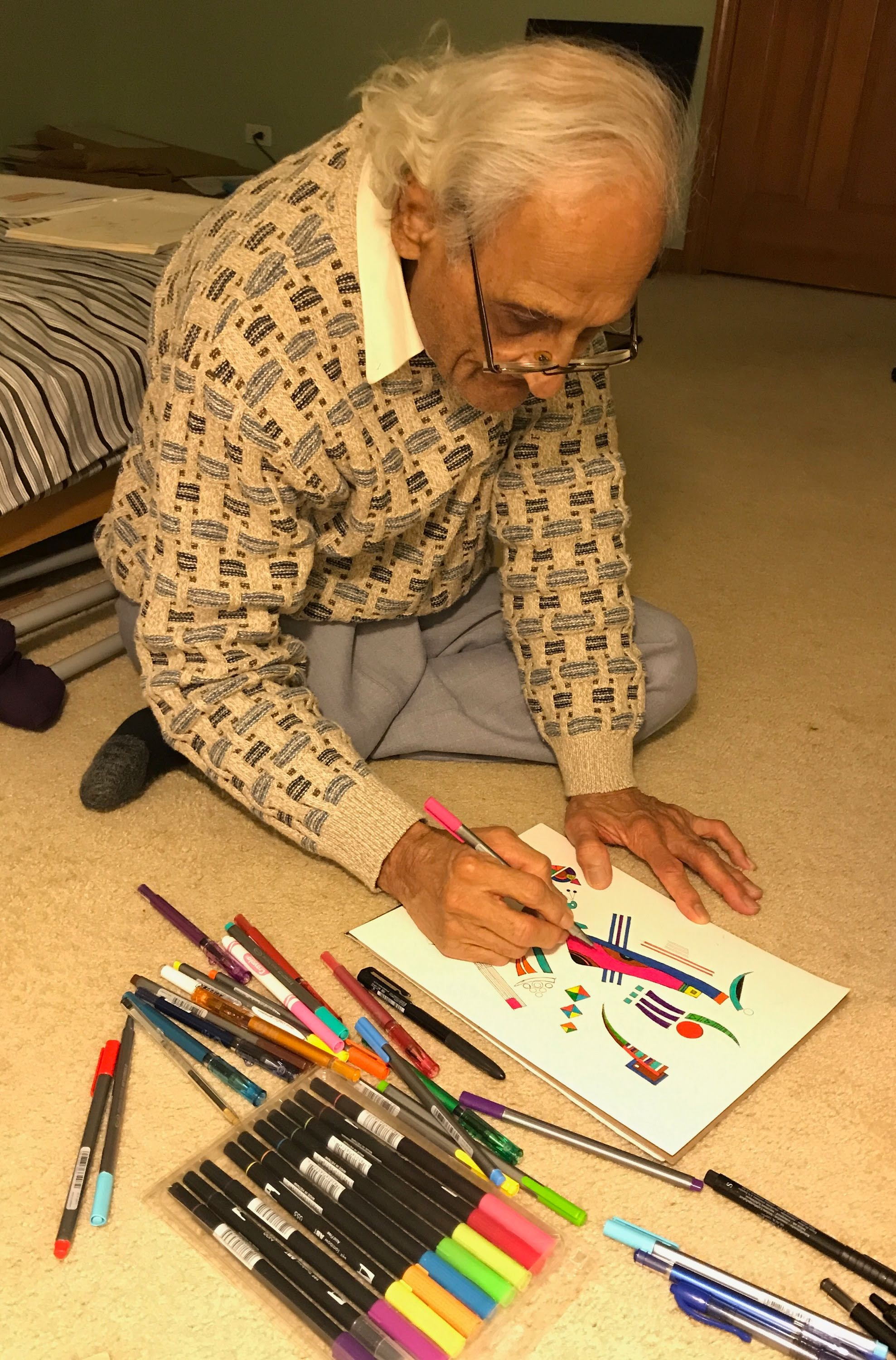
Thakor Patel drawing

Thakor Patel (born 1932) is an Indian-born Zimbabwean contemporary artist. Patel studied art in the Bombay area, at the Sir J.J School of Art, where he passed first-class and was awarded a scholarship and a fellowship whilst also gaining a first class in Commercial Art and exhibiting in a number of local shows.

He moved to Zimbabwe in 1980 to help his cousin set up a print factory in Harare, where he resided for most of his life. He exhibited work in several galleries such as Gallery Delta and the National Gallery of Zimbabwe, and more recently in the ZEITZ MOCAA Gallery in Cape Town, South Africa. Alongside these galleries, he has exhibited his work in many other countries such as Japan, U.S.A, Germany and India. He moved to the United States of America in 2017. His paintings may be found in the permanent collection of the National Gallery of Zimbabwe and in other public and private art collections all around the world.

== Early life and school ==
He was born in 1932 in Gujarat, India. Thakor went to his local school in Sojitra until the age of 12 where he then transferred to an art school in Ahmedabad. He dreamed of being a musician, but could not find any opportunities to take lessons. Eventually, he was approached by a friend, Jeram Patel, (who incidentally also became a well-known artist) who asked him if he wanted to study art. He hesitated at first, because of his disability. Even teachers would be involved in the action mentioning that because he was handicapped, he would never become an artist who could remotely succeed, never mind make a living from it. He also recalls him not being good in school in (in particular art) where he claims he was "lame" and had a lack of skill. Patel chose to ignore them and swore that he would one day become a successful painter.

One of his teachers suggested that he pursue being an art teacher, and he desperately needed money, so he tried to do so. Yet, as he was at the interview he was questioned due to him being handicapped they claimed students might laugh and it would be too difficult to work in that sort of atmosphere. He ended up becoming a teacher later on nevertheless and succeeded in doing so. Thakor's personal skills took a step up, as he began to sketch more, do more figurative work and started to draw more of nature. Thakor states "I was attached to nature because I used to play music. I was very attached to the night, to the moonlight. It speaks to me." Patel then studied for two years in Ahmedabad until his friend proclaimed that he could now go the Sir J.J School of Art in Bombay. Patel was one of the 25 people who had a chance in the admissions to have a chance in getting into the school and Thakor was chosen as one out of three. Challenges were ahead for him though as they pointed out that he would be unable to paint wall murals due to his disability. However, Thakor proclaimed that he used to play cricket and had no problem climbing a tree to paint murals that were on the wall. This persistence and dedication helped him to stay and succeed at the art school for 5 years, where he passed first-class and then he was awarded a scholarship and a fellowship as he was teaching Fine Art to 5th year diploma students. He also gained a first class in Commercial Art.

== Career ==
Working for an advertising agency was not for him as he claims there were many complications and he was not allowed to show his full creativity and colour work he wanted to do. Thakor says he was sick of being told "no, no, no." So he made his mind up and pursued Fine Art instead. He read in a newspaper that a big government department was searching for a textile designer. He applied for the job, despite the fact he knew nothing of textiles and he got the job, out of 25 other people who signed up. Questions were asked he would travel anywhere in India, and Thakor replied with a resounding "Yes, I will Madame I can travel anywhere." He was first sent to Calcutta, where for a month he worked there for, but it was not easy or practical, as Calcutta is a busy place so for Thakor travelling with a missing leg wasn't accessible. He wasn't forced though as he described his boss as being kind, and let him train in Bombay for three months instead. The daughter of Mr Mahante (his boss) was also handicapped meaning he understood the difficulties that Mr. Patel was facing, resulting in him being in Bombay for two years after.

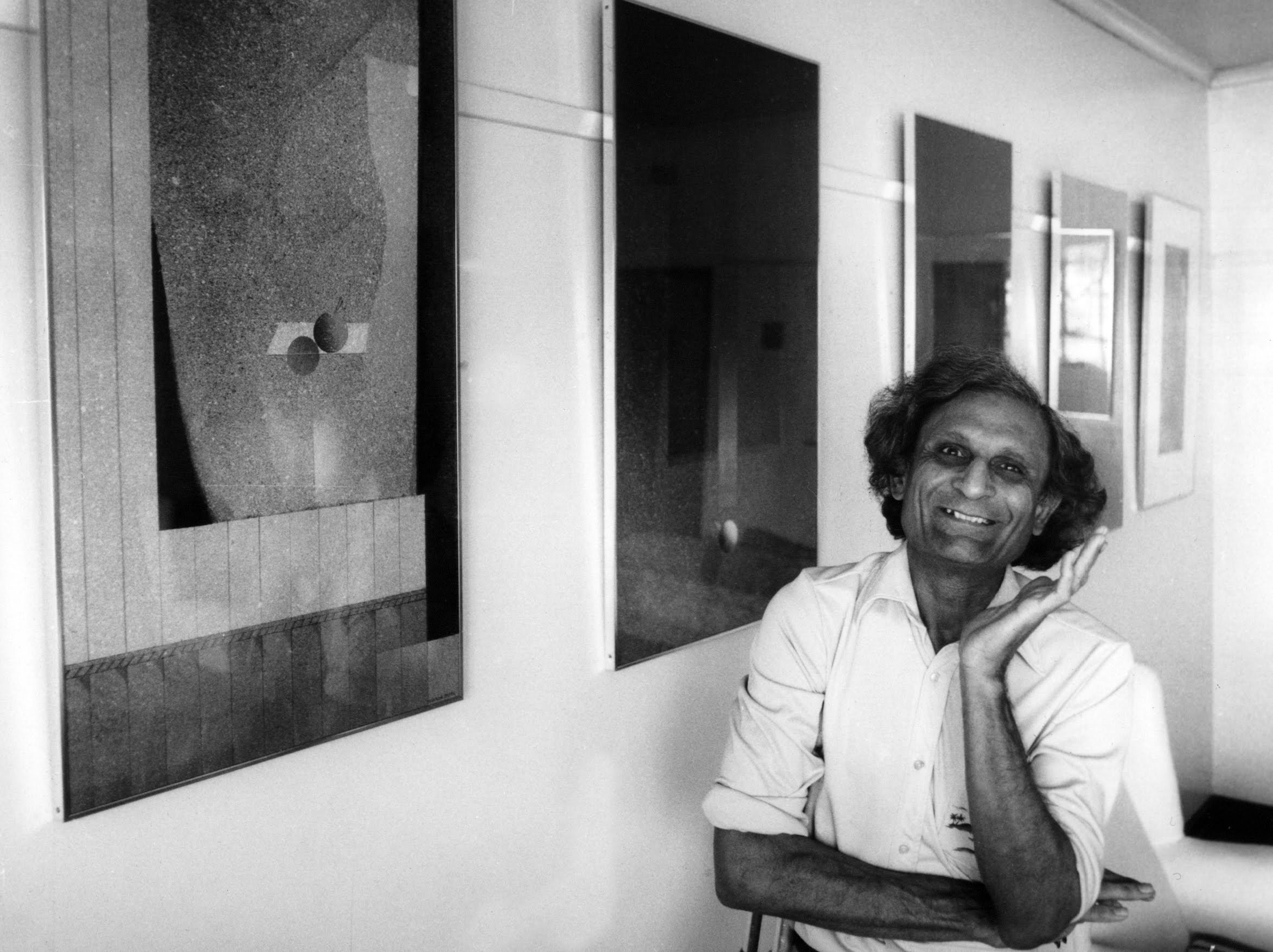

A technique that Thakor has used in many of his mixed media pieces, was pivotal to adding beautiful textures that added diversity in his paintings. His objective was to create a broken brick texture which Thakor saw after finishing class. Immediately, he started to experiment with a toothbrush to try and replicate what he saw before in the broken bricks, but with several other, more vibrant colours. It took many attempts, however he managed to perfect his technique and now it plays a meaningful part in his paintings.

Thakor now working in a textile business, would do much work where they would export products and Patel would draw alluring and appealing patterns and designs with colour, that foreigners would travel far from France, Britain, America and Japan. Thakor's routine was simple: exhibit, leave, work, and paint at home. In his personal time he was painting landscapes and his friend Jerald Jaksin who would tell him "Thakor, come on. We will go for a landscape.” It could be 2 o’clock at night and they would still go to Nullaber Hill, where they would sit and paint beautiful paintings of the Bombay moonlight.

When Thakor was exhibiting his artwork in Bangalore, a foreigner managed to find the exhibition and see the work. Patel then a few days later, got approached by him from a phone call, asking him if he could see more of his work as he was intrigued. Thakor described himself as being nervous as he couldn't speak and understand much English and interacting with an American wouldn't be easy. Also, he lived in a small house where it would've been difficult to bring an American to, so he decided to bring his paintings to his office and show his work there instead. The man adored his paintings and wanted to even purchase one, however he mentioned that he didn't have any money with him but he would pay him abroad from America. Nevertheless, Thakor replied by saying- “I did not ask you for money-if you hang the painting in your bedroom, dining room, kitchen, I will be very happy.” In fact, all Thakor ended up asking for was three tubes of oil colours - vermilion, ultramarine, and lemon yellow. The man then sent two big boxes of paint, one for Thakor and one for his neighbour, who also painted alongside him. At the time, Thakor hadn't managed to get a one-man show, he only managed to get into group shows, and after about six months after, the American man reappeared in India while Thakor was still working in textiles, he invited Thakor to America, and he sent him a ticket. Thakor then went to Austin, Texas, where exhibited much work in galleries where he sold a fair amount as well. He managed to do six shows, his first-ever one-man shows, in areas such as Dallas, Austin, and Fort Worth, Texas, in 1970.

== Zimbabwe ==
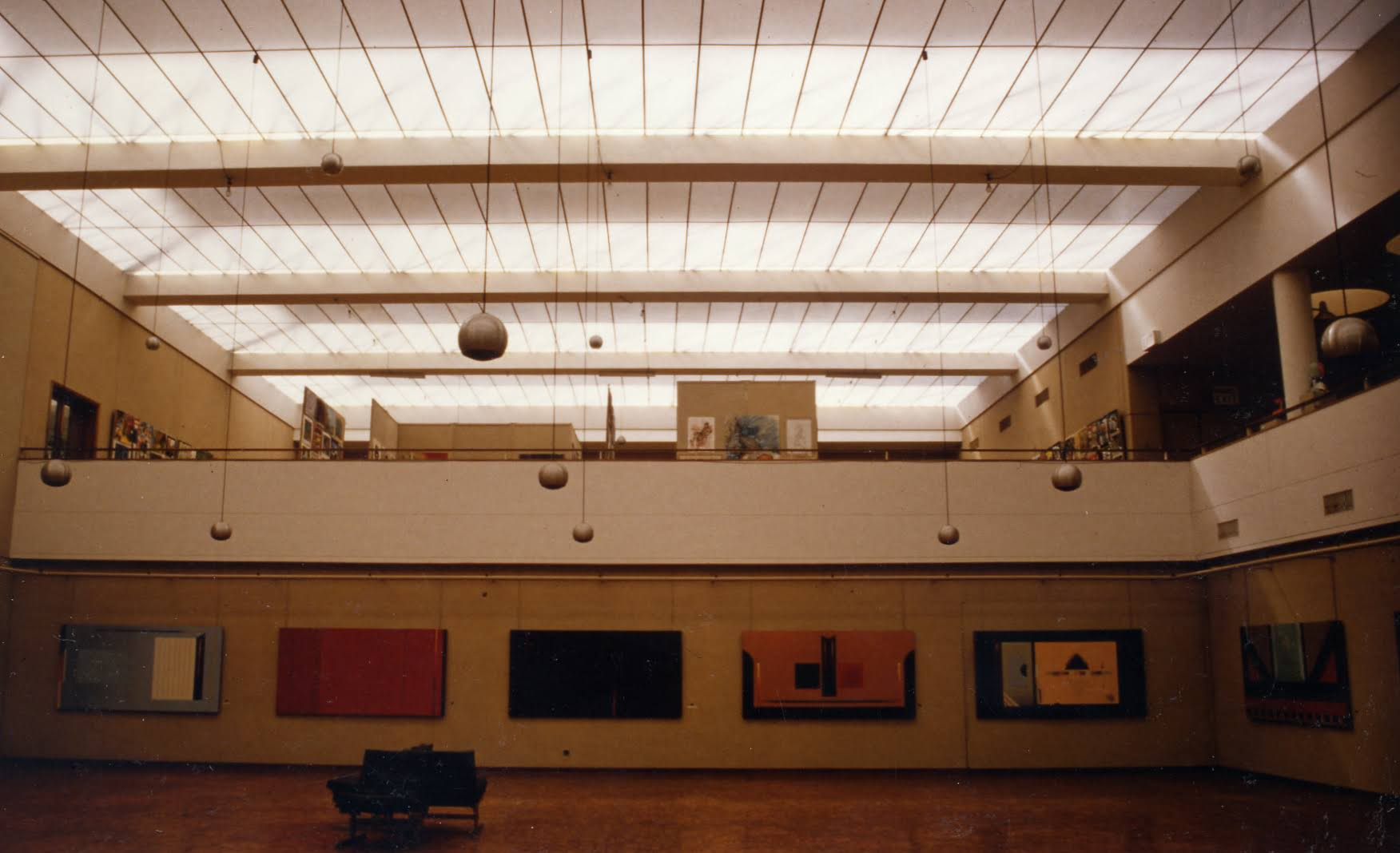
Thakor Patel exhibition (1989) at The National Gallery of Zimbabwe

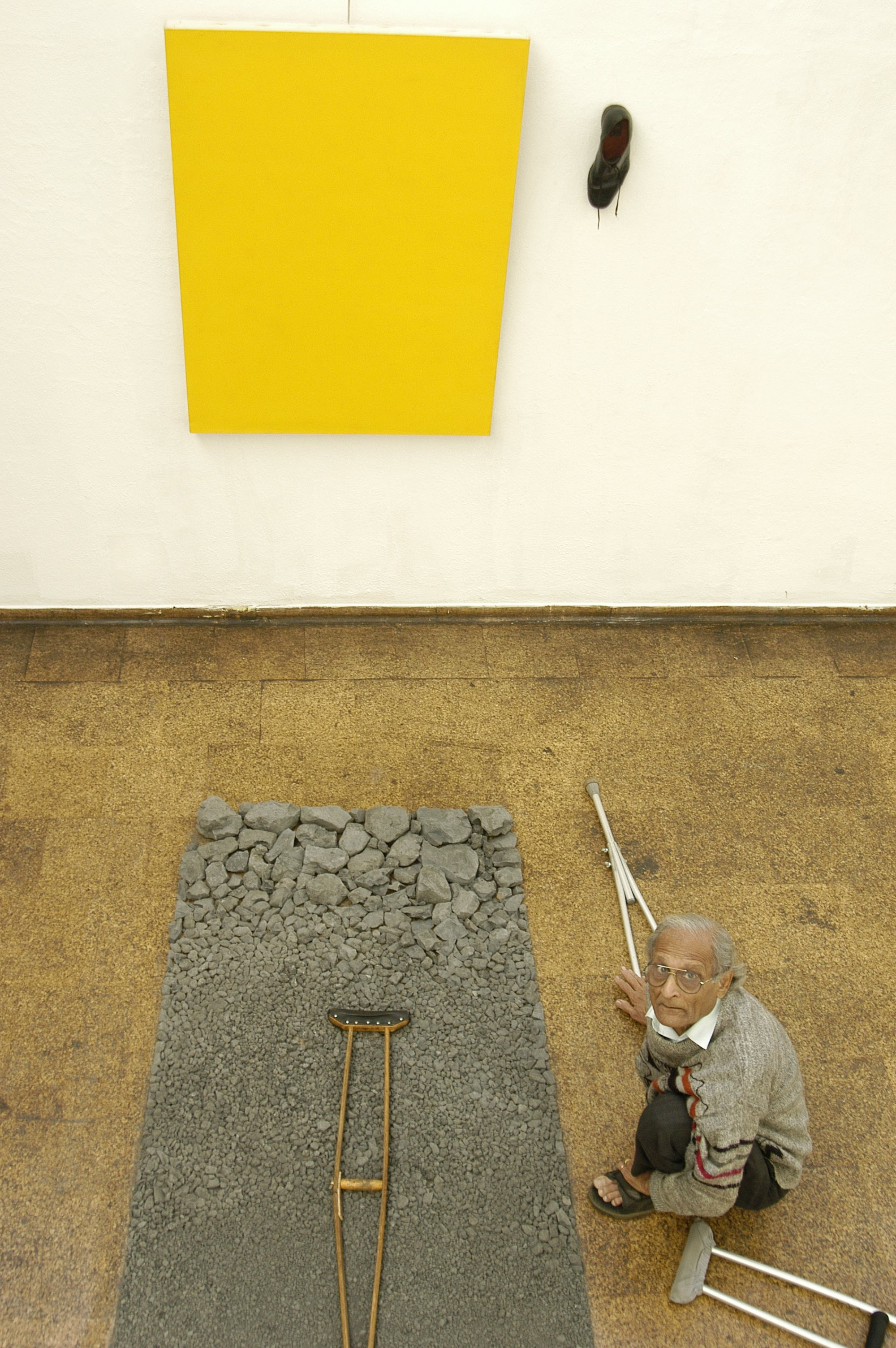
Thakor with Installation- "My last leg"

Upon returning to India and living there with his family, he was approached by a relative who pondered if he would like to help him run a print shop in Zimbabwe. He agreed and moved to Harare by himself in 1980, initially only planning on staying for a year, maybe even two, but eventually coming to the realization that he quite liked it there. This love for Africa may have been passed down to him from his father, who used to live there and regularly mentioned how much he cherished it.

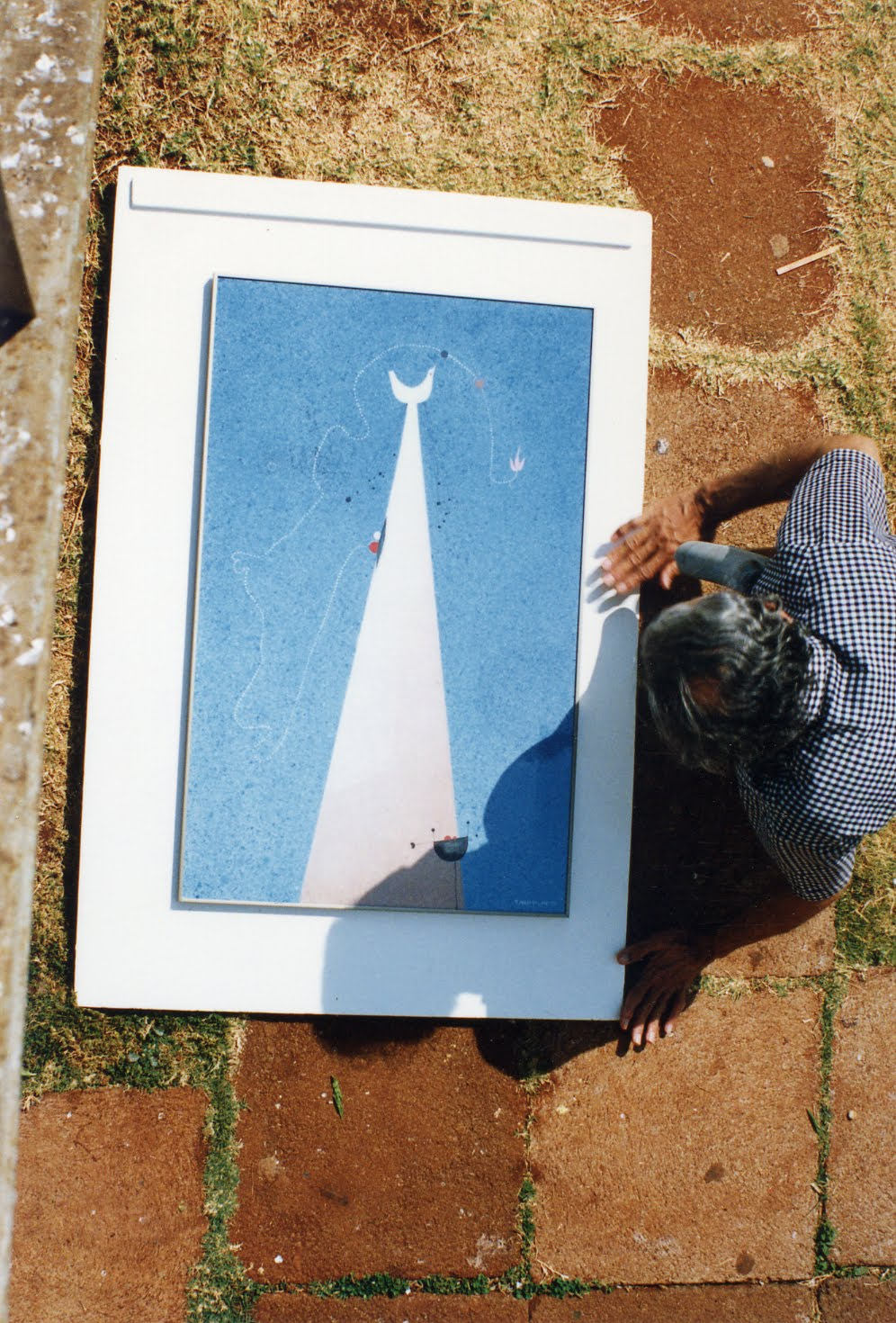

During his time in Harare he began to explore and visit art galleries, such as the notable National Gallery of Zimbabwe, where he met Carol Wales-Smith, who gave him an opportunity to display some of his work. Still, there was not much success and it wasn't a popular part of the exhibition, because his work was dark and included skulls. This was unpopular as there was a war that took place recently, and people didn't enjoy being reminded after this by looking at his work. Thakor defended this by claiming where he grew up, much violence had occurred and people were ruthless, this he had to express and not keep inside him, even though it may be negative.

Things changed for Patel though, as one day instead of walking down Moffat Road, asking small shops to sell his small drawings for 50 cents, being rejected, and seen as a beggar looking for cheap money, he walked down Manica Road and saw Gallery Delta, where he instantly felt like he belonged there. He met Helen Lieros, Babette Fitzgerald, Berry Bickle, Helen and Henry Thompson, and after getting to know the gallery and the people, he gained the interest to now stay there permanently.

His inspiration grew in Zimbabwe, the birds, trees, wildlife and the people, the culture. It all changed the perspective of Thakor and what he would paint and draw. He says he got inspiration from everything, cracks in floor tiles and he would try to implement it in his work somehow. Thakor travelled across the world visiting many museums and galleries seeing much work which inspired him to do more paintings. He doesn't know if he would have been more successful, living in other countries like America or India, but definitely says his style would be dramatically different; and he was strongly advised to stay in America.

Thakor enjoyed living in Zimbabwe for 35+ years, exhibiting and enjoying his life there, in Harare. His works varied from large oil paintings, to smaller watercolour paintings, and more recently small fine liner drawings, which are still popular with friends he has gained over the years. He and his family now currently live in Chicago, where he is still preparing for two exhibitions later this year, which have been postponed.

== Chronology ==
- 1956, traveling scholarship, Art Society of India.
- 1957–1958, annual award of the Sir J.J. School of Art, Bombay
- 1957–1958, annual award of the Bombay Art Society, Bombay
- 1959, fellowship of the Sir J.J. School of Art, Bombay
- 1966, founding member of We Four group exhibition, Bangalore
- 1969, annual prize of the Davangree Youth Cultural Association
- 1986, National Gallery of Zimbabwe Annual Zimbabwe Heritage Exhibition. Special mention in recognition of an artist who has made significant individual contribution towards pinnacles of excellence in contemporary Zimbabwean painting.
- 1989, Zimbabwe Heritage Exhibition – National Gallery of Zimbabwe. Award of Merit (oil) works selected for Zimbabwe Heritage Exhibition in Auckland, New Zealand during the Commonwealth Games in January 1990.
- 1991, Zimbabwe Heritage Exhibition, National Gallery of Zimbabwe. Awards of Merit. Commonwealth Heads of Government Meeting, Annual Exhibition of Contemporary Visual Arts.
