= Moffat Takadiwa =

Zimbabwean artist

Moffat Takadiwa (born 1983), is a Zimbabwean contemporary sculptor. He is the founder of the Mbare Art Space in the Mbare neighborhood of the city of Harare.

== Biography ==
Moffat Takadiwa was born in 1983 in Tengwe, in the north-western district of Hurungwe where he grew up. He then relocated to the city of Harare, where he is known as the 'spiritual garbage man' because of his installations and sculptures he creates from waste products. Takadiwa trained at the Harare Polytechnic where he graduated in 2008 with a BA honors in fine art.

Takadiwa also briefly lived in South Africa. It is where he has forged alliances and collaborations that increasingly inform his artistic practice. He addresses material culture, spirituality and the environment.

== Art career ==
Takadiwa started showing his work professionally in 2008, and was soon part of a group of artists that started First Floor Gallery in Harare, which is now an important independent gallery. He has since moved away from the project. Takadiwa, whose work is community oriented, now works from Mbare Art Space a repurposed beerhall. Having found a unique register to build his work, Takadiwa, is now one of the most global contemporary Zimbabwean artists. His work is shown in various venues from Los Angeles to Johannesburg; Harare to Tokyo and many places in between.

He has reformed a former community beerhall that was abandoned in recent years into a thriving art precinct in the historical township of Mbare. The space is named Mbare Art Space, here he has built his own studio, but also invites other artists to work in community with him.

One of his pieces is currently in the collection of Jay Z.

== Solo exhibitions ==
- 2018 – Framed in Colonial Lenses, Raw Spot Gallery, Rhodes University
- 2017 – Say Hello to English, Tyburn Gallery, London
- 2016 – Across Borders, Whatiftheworld, Cape Town
- 2015 – Foreign Objects, Tyburn Gallery, London
- 2012 – Africa not reachable, First Floor Gallery, Harare

== See also ==
- Kudzanai Chiurai
- Kudzanai-Violet Hwami
- Masimba Hwati
- Netsai Mukomberanwa
- Tapfuma Gutsa
- Charles Fernando
- Dominic Benhura
- Amanda Shingirai Mushate
- Gerald Machona
