= Dominic Benhura =

Zimbabwean sculptor

- Benhura during one of his exhibitions
- Born: 1968 (age 57–58); Murewa, Rhodesia
- Known for: Sculpture

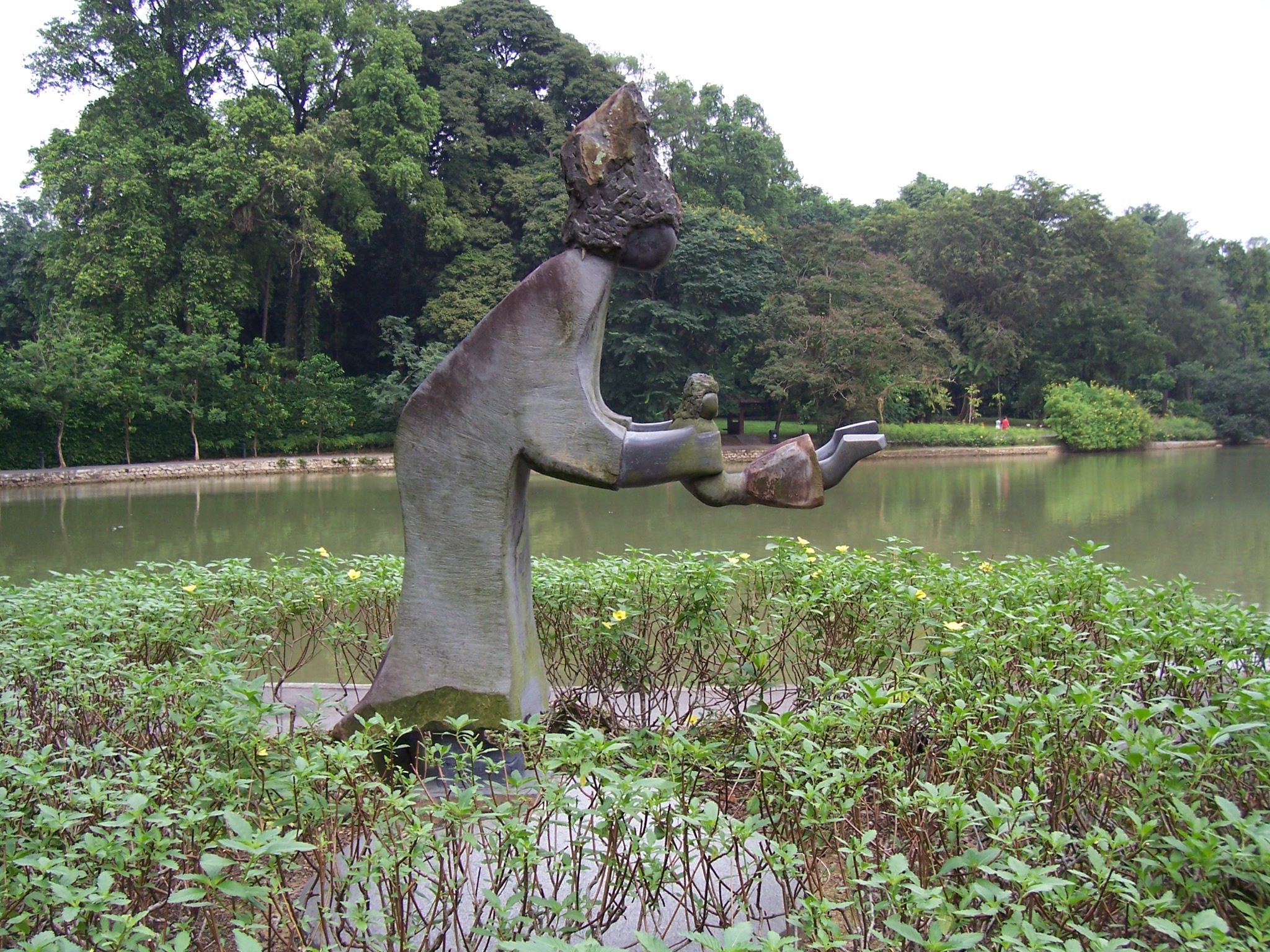
Benhura's statue Swing Me Mama (1995) in the Singapore Botanic Gardens

Dominic Benhura (born 1968) is a Zimbabwean sculptor.

== Biography ==
Benhura was born in Murewa, to the northeast of Harare. His father died before his birth, and he was raised by his mother. As he was an excellent student, it was suggested that he be sent to Salisbury for further studies. His uncle had a home in the suburb of Tafara, and Benhura went to live there at the age of 10. He lived with his cousin Tapfuma Gutsa, who was already a well-known sculptor in Zimbabwe. Benhura began polishing his cousin's sculptures, but soon began carving himself, making small offcuts before moving onto large stone. He would begin creating sculptures when he was 12 years old and even sold one of his sculptures at this age.

== Career ==
Despite having no formal training, Benhura would split up time between going to high school and making sculptures to eventually begin showcasing them in group exhibitions in his hometown. In 1986, he got his exposure to recognition by the public eye when he won first place at the National Gallery of Zimbabwe’s Annual Schools Competition. He would begin training at Chapungu Sculpture Park and eventually showing his first works there for the first time in 1987. He was also invited to the Millesgarten Sculpture Park and Museum overseas to showcase his work in their exhibitions. He joined the resident artist program there in 1990, staying until acquiring a home in Athlone, Harare, in 1995. Through the program he worked on larger pieces; he also began traveling during this period, attending workshops in Botswana, the United States, Belgium, the Netherlands, Denmark, and Germany. Benhura would go on to open his own art studio for young and upcoming sculptors in Zimbabwe to perfect their craft and benefit from the potential of journalists and visiting artists to discover their works.

=== Awards ===
Dominic Benhura has collected many awards over the years for his sculptures and collections made. These include:

- National Annual Schools Competition First prize in the 3D category National arts Gallery (1987)
- Second prize Remise Akademiet Brande (International Art Competition) Denmark (1996)
- National Gallery of Zimbabwe Award of Distinction in the Visual Arts (1997)
- Key to Delray Beach received from the honorable Mayor David Schmidt (March 2001, USA)
- Dan’s Papers Best of Best 2001, 2002 and 2003 (USA)
- NAMA (National Arts Merits Awards) Outstanding Achievement in 3D visual arts (2001)
- Franco COMESA Club Award for the best sculpture at The Franco COM ESA Club Art Exhibition (2004, Lusaka, Zambia)
- Cornell Museum of Art and History at Old School Square Cultural Arts Centre USA Certificate for outstanding commitment and accomplishments in the 2002 Mentor programme & Cornell Museum Inaugural Outdoor Sculpture Exhibit
- National Gallery of Zimbabwe Silver Jubilee Certificate recognizing outstanding sculpture made between 2004/2005
- NAMA Outstanding Achievement Award in the National Arts Council of Zimbabwe Arts personality of the year 2005
- National Gallery of Zimbabwe 1st Edition Biennale Award: December 2005
- NAMA - Award for Outstanding Achievement in the Visual Arts Category for Mixed Media Work (February 2005)
- NAMA Award for nomination in the Silver Jubilee (March 2006)
- NAMA award for outstanding achievement in arts service (February 2007)
- JCI Zimbabwe Award for being one of the Ten Outstanding Young Zimbabweans (September 2007)
- NAMA Certification of Merit for Nomination in the Outstanding Mixed Media Category (February 2010)
- NAMA People’s Choice Award in the Visual Art’s Category (February 2010)
- International Council of African a Womanism
- University of Zimbabwe Chapter recognition as a distinguished honoree (October 2010)
- University of British Columbia Certificate (UBC) for completion in the Residence Programme as part of an affiliated event for the faculty of Education’s 50th Anniversary Celebrations in Canada
- The World’s Children’s Prize for the Rights of the Child

== Works ==
Dominic Benhura has a substantial number of ideas that he uses in his work; this includes using plants, animals and the spectrum of human experience; he also uses his five children as one of the main inspirations for his many sculptures. He prioritizes using physical form to depict human emotions instead of using facial expression. He created a sculpture titled "Leap Frog" which can be found as a prominent installation in the Hartsfield International Airport in Atlanta, GA. In 2003, Benhura presented his piece "Swing Me Mama" to Nelson Mandela who added it to his collection at the Nelson Mandela Foundation in Johannesburg, South Africa. In January 2016, he sculpted a statue of Robert Mugabe, who was the president of Zimbabwe during this time that inspired him to make art. The statue is held at the Zimbabwe State House. His more recognizable sculptures around the world include "Euphorbia Tree", “Our H.I.V.” “Friend”, “The Dance of the Rainbirds”, and “Lazy Sunday”. The British Museum has an example of his work in its permanent collection.

=== Exhibitions ===
Benhura has many sculptures that can be seen in multiple different museums and botanical gardens around the world. These include:

- Millesgarten Museum: Stockholm, Sweden
- Missouri Botanical Garden: St. Louis, Missouri
- Yorkshire Sculpture Park: West Yorkshire, England
- EXPO 92: Seville, Spain
- Kyung Am Sculpture Park and Museum: South Korea
- Benson Sculpture Park: Loveland, Colorado
- Helsinki, Finland
- Krohn Conservatory: Cincinnati Ohio
- FMO Bank, Netherlands
- Kirstenbosch National Botanical Garden: Cape Town, South Africa
- Westfalen Park: Dortmund, Germany
- Shona Sol Gallery: Santa Fe, New Mexico
- Barbara Ackerman Gallery: Los Angeles, CA
- Kastel Henkenshage: St. Oedenrode, Holland
- Kastel Alden Biezen: Bilzen, Belgium
- Workshop: Ft. Canning, Singapore
- Modern African Art: Berlin, Germany
- Chapungu Sculpture Park: Harare, Zimbabwe
- Artenium Gallery: Hamburg, Germany
- Edinburgh Arts Festival: Edinburgh, Scotland
- Group Exhibit at Kew Gardens, England with Chapungu Gallery
- Group Exhibit at Artspace 2000, England
- One-man Exhibition at Kubatana Gallery: Atlanta, Georgia
- One-Man Exhibition at Expo 2000, Germany

== See also ==
- Kudzanai Chiurai
- Kudzanai-Violet Hwami
- Moffat Takadiwa
- Masimba Hwati
- Netsai Mukomberanwa
- Tapfuma Gutsa
- Charles Fernando
- Amanda Shingirai Mushate
- Gerald Machona
