= Charles Fernando =

Zimbabwean abstract painter and jazz musician

- Born: January 1, 1941
- Died: January 1, 1991 (aged 50)
- Citizenship: Zimbabwean
- Occupation: Painter

Charles Fernando (1941–1995), was a Zimbabwean abstract painter and jazz musician. His style was greatly influenced by the music he played, and showed similarities to musical symbols and notes as well. His work can be found in the National Gallery of Zimbabwe.

== History ==
Charles’ family came from Mozambique, but he grew up in Mbare a ghetto of Harare. His greatest painting ever was “Sound”, the low note “E” painted in vibrant colours in circles. Some of his friends that he grew up with were; Christopher Chabhuka who was also an artist and Jazz pianist. Christopher's was well known for his metal “Cockerel” also exhibited at the National gallery of Zimbabwe. Satcha (Tendai Silas Machakaire) was one of Charles’ closest friends. In an interview in 1965 by the Harare Broadcasting Station, Satcha said that the future cars will drive on water (Hydrogen-Fuel Cell System being used today). He solved the problem of mixing Ethanol and Diesel by mixing them as vapours in the cylinder.

== See also ==
- Kudzanai Chiurai
- Kudzanai-Violet Hwami
- Moffat Takadiwa
- Masimba Hwati
- Netsai Mukomberanwa
- Tapfuma Gutsa
- Dominic Benhura
- Amanda Shingirai Mushate
- Gerald Machona
