= Chikonzero Chazunguza =

Zimbabwean artist

- Born: 13 January 1967 (age 58); Harare, Zimbabwe
- Other names: Chiko Chazunguza
- Education: National Academy of Art
- Occupation(s): Artist, educator, activist
- Years active: 1987
- Known for: Painting, printmaking

Chikonzero "Chiko" Chazunguza (born 1967), is a Zimbabwean painter, printmaker, activist and educator. He was the head of the department of arts at Harare Polytechnic

== Life and career ==
Chazunguza was born in 1967 in Harare, the capital of Rhodesia, equivalent in territory to modern Zimbabwe.

In 1987 he won a scholarship to study in the Higher Institute of Arts "Nikolay Pavlovich" (now National Academy of Art) in Sofia, Bulgaria, where he got his master of fine arts degree. In Bulgaria, Chazunguza studied classic subjects like printmaking and painting and spent seven years in the country, witnessing the collapse of the authoritarian regime and the transition to democracy.

In 1994, he returned to Zimbabwe and began trying to combine his European education with local Zimbabwean art. He has been active in many different fields, including teaching art for more than 15 years at various universities and colleges. He was the deputy director of the Zimbabwe Institute of Visual Arts and Head of the Department of Arts at Harare Polytechnic. Chazunguza participated as an adjudicator for the National Gallery of Zimbabwe and the National Gallery of Namibia. He coordinated numerous seminars and festivals and is the art director of several short films. At the same time he was engaged in many public activities in Harare.

In 2015, Chazunguza, along with Masimba Hwati and Gareth Nyandoro, represented Zimbabwe at the 56th International Art Exhibition of the Venice Biennale.

Chazunguza has won numerous awards and has exhibited in several solo exhibitions in Africa, Europe and North America.
