= Gerald Machona =

Zimbabwean contemporary visual artist

Gerald Machona (born 1986) is a Zimbabwean contemporary visual artist. The most recognizable aspect of his work is his use of decommissioned Zimbabwean dollars. Machona works in sculpture, performance, new media, photography and film. In Machona's work, he explores issues of migration, transnationality, social interaction and xenophobia in South Africa.

== Biography ==
Machona was born in Kwekwe, Zimbabwe, in 1986. In 2006, few places in Zimbabwe offered higher education in art, so Machona left Zimbabwe to pursue a bachelor's degree in art at Michaelis School of Fine Art, University of Cape Town. He went on to get his master's degree in fine arts at Rhodes University in Makhanda. Machona is now pursuing his PhD at the University of Cape Town.

== Artist process ==
In 2006, When Machona moved to Cape Town, South Africa, he faced difficulties due to the fact that he didn't have family or friends to provide him support. The lack of financial support created a feeling of displacement, which became reflective in one of his famous work, I am an Afronaut. Machona became a witness and a victim of the conflicts between the black majority and the politically dominant white minority in South Africa. The use of decommissioned Zimbabwean currency is commonly seen in his art work to reflect on the sense of disempowerment and disconnectedness he experienced when Machona arrived in South Africa. Due to hyperinflation and economic instability in Zimbabwe, Zimbabwean dollars are measured in pennies compared to the US dollar. He uses these decommission dollars to provide commentary on the currency that was supposed to provide security, had begun to lose value and eventually became obsolete.

== Notable works ==
=== Photography ===
==== Your Silence Will Not Protect You ====
Greener Pastures is an exhibition of Machona held at the Goodman Gallery in Cape Town in 2018. The exhibition was about yearning for a better life or situation, featuring themes that hint to an Afro-Utopia. In the show, the photographic piece Your Silence Will Not Protect You (2018) was featured. In the photograph, there is a figure cloaked in Holstein skin, fully surrounded by flowers made of decommissioned dollars. The gesture in the photograph is reminiscent to the Lobola process where the women in the bride's family, gleefully hit the groom. Machona musters a feminist portrayal to expose how matriarchal voices are rising and changing patriarchal African cultural identities.

=== Sculpture ===
==== BRICS ====
BRICS (2018) was one of the Machona's floral sculptures exhibited at the Greener Pastures exhibition. The piece is made of glass, copper and decommissioned currency. In the same exhibition, the floral sculpture 7 Colonial Powers (2018) gathers the national flowers of European states that split the African continent into colonial plunder in the winter of 1884/85, while BRICS represents twenty-first-century economies that function as neocolonial powers and, in the case of China, have a sizable domestic population of African-born workers.

=== Performance ===
==== Ndiri Afronaut (I am an Afronaut) ====
Machona has several works that center around the themes of Afrofuturism. When Machona moved to Cape Town in 2006, he faced xenophobia and Afrophobia first hand. His work after living there has reflected the struggle towards what he calls Afro-Utopia. Machona engages in his sculptural space suit, Ndiri Afronaut (I am an Afronaut), that has the commonality of Zimbabwean bank notes featured in several of his works. In 2012, Machona had other collaborators wore the suit for a series of performances for film projects featured in Vabvakure (People from Far Away). Over time, the Afronaut became a form of protection against real or symbolic dangers in South Africa. At the end of the performances, it concludes on a light note with Machona and the other Afronauts shedding their protective gear, revealing they are not European but African explorers.

== Exhibitions ==
=== Solo exhibitions ===
- 2014 Vabvakure (People From Far Away), Goodman Gallery, Johannesburg, South Africa
- 2016 Art Basel 47, Basel, Switzerland

=== Group exhibitions ===
==== Notable exhibitions ====
Gerald Machona was featured in a group exhibition called, Disguise: Masks and Global African Art located in major Institution, the Brooklyn Museum. This show included other famous contemporary artist such as Nick Cave, Edson Chagas, Emeka Ogboh, Nandipha Mntambo and many others.

Machona's work was included in a major biennial show called What remains is tomorrow; the installation at the South African Pavilion at 56th Venice Biennale, 2015. Alongside Machona, the exhibition included contemporary artists such as Willem Boshoff, Angus Gibson, Jo Ractliffe, Robin Rhode and several others.

- 2007 The inchoate, idiosyncratic descent into nihilism, Michaelis Gallery, Cape Town, South Africa
- 2007 Easy Access, University of Cape Town Baxter residence, Cape Town, South Africa
- 2009 Michaelis Graduate Show 2009, Michaelis School of Arts, UCT, Cape Town, South Africa
- 2010 Mari Yebepa (Paper money), Association for Visual Arts, Cape Town, South Africa
- 2010 African Artists Showcase, Artscape, Cape Town, South Africa
- 2010 Us, Iziko South African National Gallery, Cape Town, South Africa
- 2010 Mobile Cinema, Grahamstown National Arts Festival, Grahamstown, South Africa
- 2010 Refugee day exhibition, Cape Creative Centre, Cape Town, South Africa
- 2011 The Night Show, Goodman Gallery, Cape Town, South Africa
- 2011 Geography of Somewhere, Stevenson Gallery, Johannesburg, South Africa
- 2012 Working Title, Goodman Gallery, Cape Town, South Africa
- 2012 Making Way, Grahamstown National Arts Festival, Grahamstown, South Africa
- 2013 Making Way, Standard Bank Gallery, Johannesburg, South Africa
- 2013 ‘Vabvakure’, (People from far away) (MFA show), Guy Butler Theatre, Grahamstown, South Africa
- 2013 The beautiful ones, Nolan Judin Gallery, Berlin, Germany
- 2013 Working Title, Goodman Gallery, Johannesburg, South Africa
- 2013 St Moritz Art Masters Performance, Mercedes Benz Art Lounge, St Moritz, Switzerland
- 2013 Sommerakademie Performance, Zentrum Paul Klee, Bern, Switzerland
- 2014 C16, Goodman Gallery, Cape Town, South Africa
- 2014 Pop Goes the Revolution, New Church, Cape Town, South Africa
- 2015 South African Pavilion at 56th Venice Biennale, What remains is tomorrow, South Africa
- 2015 Edge of Silence, Goodman Gallery, Cape Town, South Africa
- 2016 Kabbo Ka Muwala: Migration and Mobility in Contemporary Art in Southern and Eastern Africa, Städtische Galerie, Bremen, Germany
- 2016 Kabbo Ka Muwala: Migration and Mobility in Contemporary Art in Southern and Eastern Africa, Makerere Art Gallery, Kampala, Uganda
- 2016 Kabbo Ka Muwala: Migration and Mobility in Contemporary Art in Southern and Eastern Africa, National Gallery of Zimbabwe, Harare, Zimbabwe
- 2016 Disguise: Masks and Global African Art at the Brooklyn Museum, New York
- 2016 Biennial of Sydney, Sydney, Australia
- 2016 New Revolutions: Goodman Gallery at 50, Goodman Gallery, Cape Town, South Africa
- 2016 The Art of Disruptions, Iziko South African National Gallery, Cape Town, South Africa
- 2019 Power of Site, Nirox Sculpture Park, South Africa
- 2019 Still Here Tomorrow to High Five You Yesterday, Zeitz MOCAA, Cape Town, South Africa

== Awards and merits ==
Gerald Machona has won several awards in his solo and group artist career. Machona's work has been featured in numerous public collections, including Johannesburg Art Gallery, Goodman Gallery, Stevenson Gallery, Iziko South African National Gallery and Zeitz Museum of Contemporary Art.

- 2013 Mail & Guardian 200 Young South Africans (YSA)
- 2011 Mellon Foundation Scholarship.
- 2011 Business day & FNB Johannesburg Art Fair's top ten Young African Artists (YAA)
- 2011 Cultural Award, Drosty Hall (Rhodes University)

== See also ==
- Amanda Shingirai Mushate
- Kudzanai Chiurai
- Kudzanai-Violet Hwami
- Moffat Takadiwa
- Masimba Hwati
- Netsai Mukomberanwa
- Tapfuma Gutsa
- Charles Fernando
- Dominic Benhura
