= Greenwood Park =

Greenwood Park may refer to:

- Greenwood Park (Des Moines), Iowa
- Greenwood Park, Harare, Zimbabwe
- Greenwood Park (Tennessee), Nashville, Tennessee
- Greenwood Memorial Park (disambiguation)
- Greenwood Urban Wetlands, also known as Greenwood Park (Orlando, Florida)
