= Kudzanai-Violet Hwami =

Zimbabwean painter (born 1993)

- Born: 1993 (age 32–33); Gutu, Zimbabwe
- Education: Wimbledon College of Arts (BFA Painting, 2016); Ruskin School of Art, University of Oxford (MFA, 2021)
- Known for: Explorations of sexuality, race, and gender Collage-based painting process
- Notable work: Participation in Venice Biennale (2019); Solo exhibitions including A Making of Ghosts (2023) and When You Need Letters for Your Skin (2021)
- Style: Painting
- Movement: Contemporary art
- Awards: Apollo magazine "40 Under 40 Africa" (2020)

Kudzanai-Violet Hwami (born 1993) is a Zimbabwean painter who lives and works in London, England. Her work explores sexuality, race, and gender.

== Early life ==
She was born in Gutu, Zimbabwe, where she lived until she was nine. From age nine to seventeen, she lived in South Africa. At age 17, she moved to London, England.

== Education ==
She graduated with a Bachelor of Fine Arts with a concentration in Painting from the Wimbledon College of Arts in London in 2016 and completed her Master of Fine Arts from the Ruskin School of Art at Oxford University in 2021.

== Work ==
Hwami has had several solo and group exhibitions in various cities and galleries across the globe. She held her first solo exhibition at Marylebone’s Tyburn Gallery in London in 2016. Hwami was included in the 2019 Venice Biennale. In 2020, Hwami was included in Apollo magazine's "40 Under 40 Africa". Between 2020-2022, her work was also included in Allied with Power: African & African Diaspora Art, an exhibition at the Peréz Art Museum Miami.

Her work is included in the permanent collection of the Zeitz MOCAA museum, South Africa. Currently, she's represented by Victoria Miro.

In 2022, Hwami shared her process and inspiration for her art in an interview with Amah-Rose Abrams from Wallpaper Magazine:

Her process as an artist is meticulously planned and considered, starting with collaging images and creating the structure of a painting around them. It’s a creative approach she picked up observing and collating images on Tumblr, both creatively and in an effort to get to grips with her identity. ‘I spent a lot of time on the internet as a pre-teen and, in that socially awkward stage of my life, I found it more comfortable to escape and exist in cyberspace,’ she explains. ‘I started exploring sexuality and gender identity. I was obsessed with the idea of physically living in a different body. All my frustration and confusion was expressed through studying the queer body.’

=== Solo exhibitions ===
Hwami has had several solo exhibitions, which include:

- 2023: A Making of Ghosts, Victoria Miro, London, UK
- 2022: Kunsthaus Pasquart, Biel, Switzerland
- 2021: When You Need Letters for Your Skin, Victoria Miro, London, UK
- 2019: Gasworks, London, UK
- 2017: If You Keep Going South You’ll Meet Yourself, Tyburn Gallery, London, UK
- 2013: We Made You Nations & Tribes, Corn Exchange, Manchester, UK

== See also ==
- Kudzanai Chiurai
- Moffat Takadiwa
- Masimba Hwati
- Netsai Mukomberanwa
- Tapfuma Gutsa
- Charles Fernando
- Dominic Benhura
- Amanda Shingirai Mushate
- Gerald Machona
