= Statue of Robert Mugabe =

Statue in Harare, Zimbabwe

- Artist: Dominic Benhura
- Year: 2016
- Subject: Robert Mugabe
- Dimensions: 3.7 m (12 ft)
- Location: State House; Harare, Zimbabwe

The Statue of Robert Mugabe is a 12-foot-high (3.7 m) springstone statue of the former Zimbabwean president Robert Mugabe located at State House in Harare. Made by the Zimbabwean sculptor Dominic Benhura, it was unveiled in 2016 but was subject to criticism and mockery for its design.

== Background ==
Mugabe had been prime minister and later President of Zimbabwe since the country transitioned from Rhodesia and gained independence from the United Kingdom in 1980. In 2016, Mugabe asked for a statue to be made of himself and asked local sculptor Dominic Benhura to craft it out of springstone using chisels and sandpaper. It took Benhura six months to sculpt it. The statue consists of a 12-foot (3.7 m) figure of Mugabe with his fist in the air. It was revealed at State House in September 2016.

== Reaction ==
Upon the statue's unveiling by Mugabe, it received criticism and mockery from around the world. A number of commentators accused it of looking like "Superman taking off drunk" or characters from The Simpsons. Others viewed it as following a convention of dictators ordering the erection of statues of themselves.

The sculptor responded to the criticism by saying it was done in his style, of which Mugabe knew, and was not a mockery. Mugabe said he liked it and called for respect for the sculptor who had made it after inspecting another statue of himself that he had commissioned. This came after it was revealed Mugabe had spent $5 million on two more statues of himself made in North Korea to be erected after his death.
