= Masimba Hwati =

Zimbabwean artist

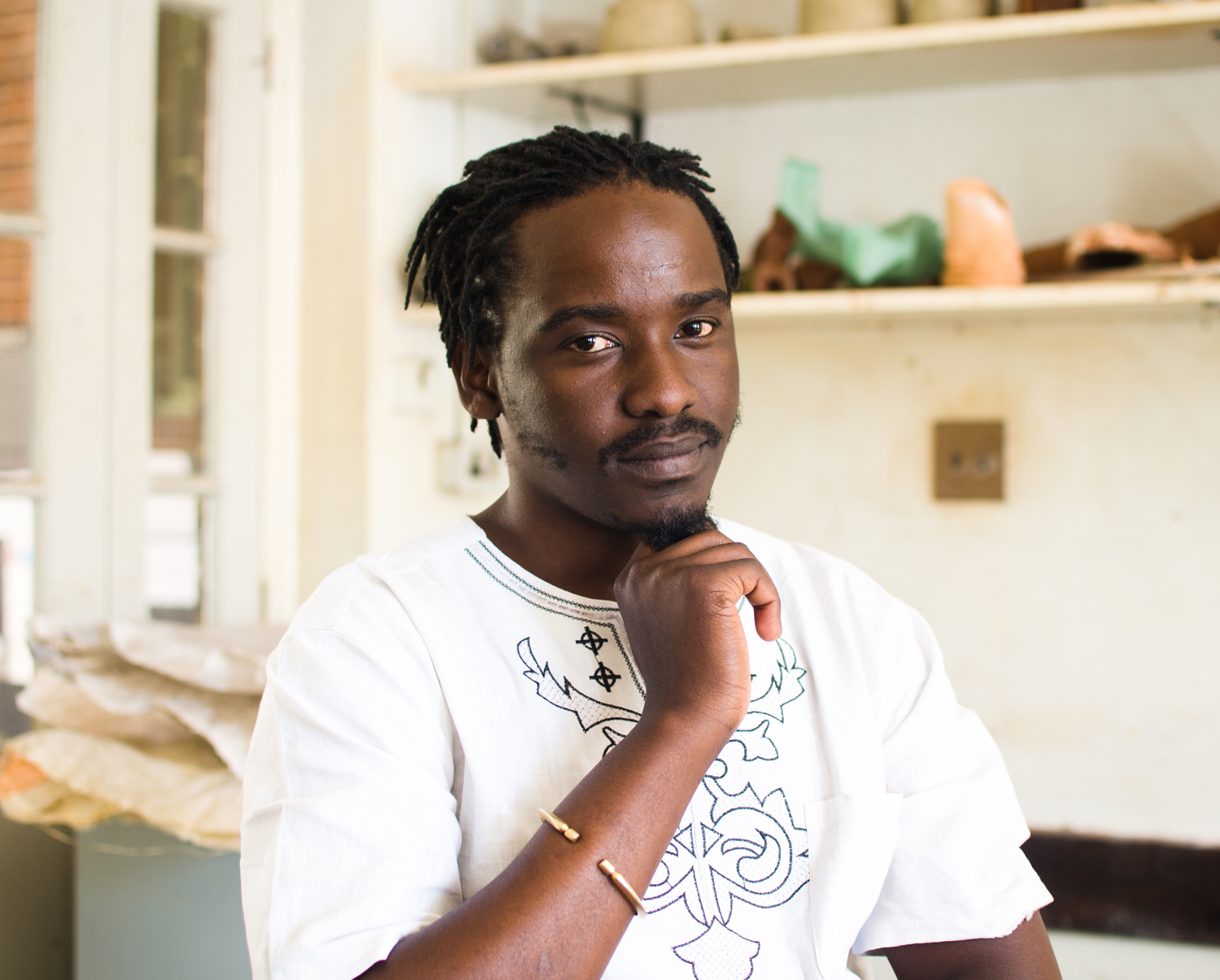
- Hwati in 2012
- Born: Masimba Hwati; Highfield, Zimbabwe
- Education: Akademie Der Bildenden Künste, Wien Österreich, Harare Polytechnic; University of Michigan
- Occupation: Multidisciplinary Artist
- Known for: Unconventional three-dimensional mixed media sculptures, Experimental sound work and research.

Masimba Hwati is an interdisciplinary artist from Zimbabwe, working internationally at the intersections of sculpture, performance, and sound, known for his unconventional three-dimensional mixed media sculptures.

== Life and career ==
Hwati graduated from Harare Polytechnic School of Art and Design in 2003 where he majored in Ceramics and Painting. Hwati taught Visual Arts and 3D Art at Harare Polytechnic School of Art and Design. He is a PhD Candidate at Akademie Der Bildenden Künste Wien, Österreich, an MFA from Penny W. Stamps School of Art and Design University of Michigan, Ann Arbor. He was most recently, included in the Montreal Museum of Fine Art's (MMFA) exhibition, Face To Face: From Yesterday to Today, Non-Western Art and Picasso.

In 2015, he was one of three artists, along with Chikonzero Chazunguza and Gareth Nyandoro, selected for Pixels Of Ubuntu/Unhu for the Zimbabwean Pavilion at the 56th Venice Biennale. He is an honorary research fellow at Rhodes University Fine Arts Department in Grahamstown, South Africa.

== Techniques and aims ==
Hwati explores the transformation and evolution of knowledge systems that are indigenous to his own background whilst experimenting with the symbolism and perceptions attached to cultural objects, expressed as an art movement known as "The Energy of Objects".

Hwati attempts to work from basics, creating his own pigments, and creating objects from basic materials. His works use contemporary and historical themes. He also works extensively with found objects, transforming existing artifacts into elements of works of art.

Hwati says that he should be able to find at least 35 variations in any given object, but says that often he cannot realize more than ten.

== Critical reception ==
Hwati was named amongst 12 "The Ones to Watch" by New African Magazine ahead of the 1-54 Contemporary Art Fair in London at Somerset House.

== Awards and honors ==
In 2006 Hwati won the National Art Merit Award, the highest individual art honour in Zimbabwe. He was one of three national representatives who had a showing at the Zimbabwean Pavilion exhibition, Pixels Of Ubuntu/Unhu, at the 56th Venice Biennale.

Year	Institution	Award
2018	Penny W. Stamps School of Art and Design (MFA First Year Exhibition)	Jean-Paul Slusser Award
2016	Cape Town Art Fair	Special Project
2015	56th Venice Biennale	Pixels Of Ubuntu/Unhu
2006	National Arts Merit Awards (NAMA)	
2014	Research Fellow the Arts of Africa and the Global South search Program Rhodes University Grahamstown South Africa	Associate Artist /Honorary

== Exhibitions ==
=== Solo exhibitions ===
- 2017 Art Brussels - Belgium (Solo booth Smac Gallery)
- 2017 Instruments of Memory Stellenbosch Cape Town
- 2016 Instruments of Memory / Simbi dzeNdangariro Smac Gallery Stellenbosch, Cape Town, South Africa
- 2016 Joburg Art fair Trek: Following Journeys 16.05.15 – 27.06.15
- 2014 Quantumlogik, Solo Exhibition, Gallery Delta Harare Zimbabwe
- 2010 Facsimiles of Energy, Solo Exhibition, Gallery Delta Harare Zimbabwe

=== Group exhibitions ===
- 2015 Venice Biennale All the Worlds’ futures Curated by Okwui Enwezor, Pixels of Ubuntu Zimbabwe pavilion, curated by Raphael Chikukwa
- 2015 London I:54 Art Fair, London, UK

== See also ==
- Kudzanai Chiurai
- Kudzanai-Violet Hwami
- Moffat Takadiwa
- Netsai Mukomberanwa
- Tapfuma Gutsa
- Charles Fernando
- Dominic Benhura
- Amanda Shingirai Mushate
- Gerald Machona
