= Helen Lieros =

Zimbabwean visual artist (1940–2021)

- Born: August 3, 1940; Gweru, Zimbabwe
- Died: July 14, 2021 (aged 80); Harare, Zimbabwe
- Known for: Painting
- Spouse: Derek Huggins

Helen Lieros (3 August 1940 – 14 July 2021), was a Zimbabwean visual artist and educator, mentoring generations of artists for over five decades. Lieros was one of Zimbabwe's most illustrious artists and had a career that spanned across six decades.

== Early life and education ==
She was born on 3 August 1940 in Gweru, Zimbabwe to Greek immigrant parents. She studied at the Ecole des Beaux-Arts and the Centre Contemporaine de la Gravure (now the Istituto statale d'arte di Firenze) in Geneva, Switzerland.

After wandering in Europe, Lieros returned to Zimbabwe (then Rhodesia) in 1964, and took up a position as a teacher at Chaplin High School, where she had been a student.

== Career ==
After teaching she moved to Harare (then Salisbury) in 1967, where she lived until her death. She established Gallery Delta in Harare with her husband Derek Huggins in 1975. The independent space has been involved in the curation, organisation, presentation and promotion of approximately five-hundred exhibitions. Besides being invested in her own practice, Lieros and her husband dedicated most of their career teaching and mentoring generations of Zimbabwean painters. These include Berry Bickle, Greg Shaw, Lovemore Kambudzi, Cosmas Shiridzinonwa, Gina Maxim, Misheck Masamvu, Admire Kamudzengerere, Richard Mudariki, and many others. In early 2021, Lieros was honored by the National Arts Council of Zimbabwe as a National Merits Awards Legend.

Lieros died in 2021, aged 81, from COVID-19 during the COVID-19 pandemic in Zimbabwe.

== Solo exhibitions ==
- 1966 Naikes’ Gallery, Bulawayo.
- 1968 Polworth's Galleries, Harare.
- 1970 Barbour's Gallery, Harare.
- 1970 Stoa Texnis Gallery, Athens.
- 1972/75 Tara Arts & Seven Arts, Harare.
- 1973 Diogenes International Galleries, Athens.
- 1979 Exhibition, Gallery Delta, Harare.
- 1983 Selected works, PG Gallery, National Gallery of Zimbabwe, Harare.
- 1985 Galerie Chausse Coqs, Geneva.
- 1991 Major Retrospective Exhibition, National Gallery of Zimbabwe, Harare.
- 1995 Diary of an Inheritance Gallery Delta, Harare.
- 1995 Antithesis, Mayfair Gallery, London.
- 1998 Logos – The Word Gallery Delta, Harare.
- 2004 Retrospective Exhibition – a selection of paintings and graphics over three decades 1974 -2004, Gallery Delta, Harare.
- 2004 Diaspora Municipal Gallery of Kallithea (Δημοτική Πινακοθήκη Καλλιθέας), Greece.
- 2005 Aeons National Gallery of Zimbabwe.
- 2007 Antithesis Municipal Gallery of Kallithea, Greece.
