= Portia Zvavahera =

Zimbabwean painter (born 1985)

- Born: 22 March 1985 (age 41); Harare, Zimbabwe
- Education: Visual Art Studios at the National Gallery of Zimbabwe; Harare Polytechnic
- Occupation: Painter
- Awards: Tollman Award for the Visual Arts; FNB Art Prize

Portia Zvavahera (born 1985) is a Zimbabwean painter.

== Early life ==
Zvavahera was born in Harare, Zimbabwe, in 1985. She studied at the BAT Visual Art Studios at the National Gallery of Zimbabwe from 2003 to 2004 and obtained a diploma in visual arts from Harare Polytechnic in 2006, where she was taught by the Zimbabwean artist and printmaker Chiko Chazunguza. Many of her paintings incorporate block-printed elements using oil-based printing ink.

== Career ==
In 2009, Zvavahera was an artist-in-residence at Greatmore Studios in Cape Town, South Africa. Zvavahera represented Zimbabwe at the 55th Venice Biennale in 2013 as part of the exhibition Dudziro: Interrogating the Visions of Religious Beliefs. She joined Stevenson, South Africa, in 2013. Previously, Zvavahera exhibited her work at the National Gallery of Zimbabwe and at Gallery Delta.

She won South Africa's Tollman Award for the Visual Arts in 2013 and South Africa's FNB (First National Bank) Art Prize in 2014. In 2017, Zvavahera participated in a three-month residency at the Gasworks in London, United Kingdom, supported by the Institute of Contemporary Art Indian Ocean (ICAIO).

Her work was included in the 2024 exhibition Making Their Mark: Works from the Shah Garg Collection at the Berkeley Art Museum and Pacific Film Archive (BAMPFA).

== Exhibitions ==
- Kettle’s Yard - Cambridge, United Kingdom (October 2024 to February 2025)
- CaixaForum - Madrid - Revered and Feared. Feminine Power in Art and Belief (2024)
- Shah Garg Foundation - New York - Making Their Mark (2023)
- Museum de Fundatie - Zwolle, Netherlands - Brave New World: 16 Painters for the 21st Century, (2023)
- Musée d’Art Moderne - Paris, France The Power of My Hands (2021)
- David Zwirner - London, United Kingdom and New York, USA (2020–21)
- Pérez Art Museum - Miami, USA - Allied with Power: African and African Diaspora Art from the Jorge M Pérez Collection (2020)
- El Espacio 23 - Miami, USA - Witness: Afro Perspectives from the Jorge M. Pérez Collection (2020)
- The Warehouse - Dallas Psychic Wounds: On Art and Trauma (2020)
- 6th Lubumbashi Biennale, Democratic Republic of Congo - Future Genealogies: Stories from the Equatorial Line (2019)
- De 11 Lijnen - Belgium - A dialogue with Gustav Klimt (2019 - 2020)
- Oaxaca - Hacer Noche/Crossing Night (2018)
- Garage Museum of Contemporary Art - Moscow - The Fabric of Felicity (2018)
- Zeitz MOCAA, Cape Town- Five Bhobh – Painting at the End of an Era (2018)
- 10th Berlin Biennale - We don't need another hero (2018)
- Minneapolis Institute of Art - The Contested Body (2017)
- Minneapolis Institute of Art - steirischer herbst festival, Graz - Body Luggage (2016)
- Institute of Contemporary Art Indian Ocean, Mauritius - I Love You Sugar Kane (2016)
- Le Brass Cultural Centre of Forest, Belgium - African Odyssey (2015)
- Foundation De 11 - Lijnen, Oudenburg - Liberated Subjects: Present Tense (2015)
- Kunsthalle Faust - Hannover, Germany - Shifting Africa - What the Future Holds, Mediations Biennale (2014)

== See also ==
- Netsai Mukomberanwa
- Amanda Shingirai Mushate
- Grace Nyahangare
- Shamilla Aasha
