= Johnson Zuze =

Zimbabwean artist (born 1985)

- Born: 1985 (age 40–41)
- Notable work: Enriching Women exhibition Animal Kingdom Exhibition (2018)
- Awards: Second place, "Enriching Women" exhibition (2008)* National Arts Merit Award, Zimbabwe (2016)

Johnson Zuze (born 1985) is a visual artist in Harare, Zimbabwe. Zuze is known for his art made out of recycled materials, which he collects from dump grounds near his home of Chitungwiza. Zuze's art includes items including plastic bottles, glass, wire snares and other non-biodegradable waste. Zuze was inspired to create art in response to the amount of trash in his neighborhood.

Entirely self taught, Zuze uses his art to convey social statements about environmental issues and recycling. Zuze's works using wire snares are used to spark discussion on animal poaching and conservation. Zuze uses snares collected in the Gonarezhou National Park and the Save Valley Conservancy in his work.

== Education ==
Johnson Zuze enrolled at the National Gallery of Zimbabwe’s School of Fine Arts in Harare in the early 2000s, studying painting and sculpture. There, he received training in traditional and contemporary art practices, deepened his knowledge of art history (with a focus on African aesthetics and colonial legacies), and refined his technical skills under the mentorship of experienced Zimbabwean artists.

He was influenced by prominent artists such as Dominic Benhura and Berry Bickle, who emphasized storytelling, cultural symbolism, and social critique. Zuze participated in exhibitions of his early works and completed a graduation project, a mixed-media installation titled “Resilience,” which combined indigenous patterns with contemporary materials.

Zuze pursued self-directed learning in African art movements, global contemporary trends, and digital media. He attended workshops, seminars, and artist residencies in Africa and Europe.

== Career ==
Zuze began his professional career during Zimbabwe's cultural renaissance amid economic challenges, focusing initially on community narratives, traditional symbolism, and experimental techniques. He participated in local exhibitions organized by the National Gallery of Zimbabwe and independent art collectives.

In 2006, he completed his first notable project, a commissioned mural titled “Voices of the Land” for a community center in Harare, which incorporated indigenous motifs to depict Zimbabwean history and resilience, earning praise from local media and critics.

Zuze collaborated with young artists and community groups, organizing workshops and participatory projects aimed at youth empowerment and cultural education. In 2008, he held his first solo exhibition, “Roots and Resilience,” at the National Gallery of Zimbabwe, showcasing paintings and sculptures exploring cultural identity, land, and memory; the show received critical acclaim and marked his emergence in contemporary Zimbabwean art.

He participated in regional art festivals and residencies supported by organizations like the African Artists Foundation and Goethe-Institut. His early works often addressed social issues including rural migration, urbanization, and economic struggles, establishing him as a socially conscious artist committed to fostering dialogue through narrative-driven art.

== Awards ==
Zuze began showcasing his works in 2008. His first exhibition, "Enriching Women" was recognized with a second place prize in the accompanying exhibition. In 2016, Zuze won the Zimbabwean National Art Merit Awards. In 2018, Zuze's "Animal Kingdom Exhibition" was exhibited at Harare's Delta Gallery and sponsored by the government of Switzerland.
