= Tapfuma Gutsa =

Zimbabwean sculptor (born 1956)

- Born: 1956 (age 69–70); Harare
- Citizenship: Zimbabwe
- Education: City and Guilds of London Art School
- Occupations: sculptor, installation artist
- Era: 1985 - 2011
- Website: http://www.tapfumagutsa.com/

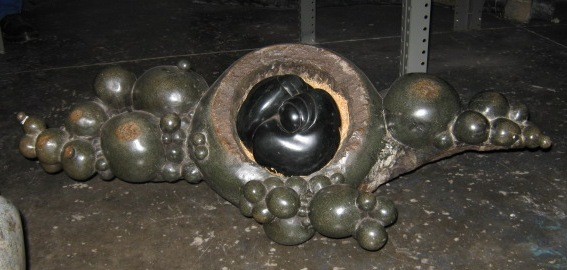
Genesis by Tapfuma Gutsa (2010)

Tapfuma Gutsa (born 1956) is a Zimbabwean stone sculptor.

== Background ==
A native of Harare, Gutsa studied sculpture with Cornelius Manguma at the Driefontein Mission School, later becoming the first Zimbabwean recipient of a British Council award. His sculptures draw on Shona cultural traditions as well as Western influences, such as Pablo Picasso. The scholarship allowed him to study in London from 1982 until 1985, where he received a diploma in sculpture from City and Guilds of London Art School.

Gutsa is unusual among Zimbabwean stone sculptors for the breadth of materials he uses in his work; his sculptures incorporate metal, paper, wood, and other foreign materials. His winning sculpture at the Nedlaw exhibition, 1987, comprised smouldering grass engulfing a wooden bird. He is the cousin of Dominic Benhura, who studied with him.

In 2007, Gutsa was one of eleven international artists commissioned by the Victoria and Albert Museum, London, to produce work for an exhibition titled 'Uncomfortable Truths: The Shadow of Slave Trading on Contemporary Art'.

== Awards ==
- 1987 Nedlaw award for sculpture, National Gallery of Zimbabwe

== See also ==
- Kudzanai Chiurai
- Kudzanai-Violet Hwami
- Moffat Takadiwa
- Masimba Hwati
- Netsai Mukomberanwa
- Charles Fernando
- Dominic Benhura
- Amanda Shingirai Mushate
- Gerald Machona
