= Anne Zanele Mutema =

Zimbabwean conceptual installation artist

- Born: 1988 (age 37–38); Harare, Zimbabwe
- Education: National Gallery Visual Art Studio; Zimbabwe Institute of Photography and Cinematography
- Known for: Installation art, Conceptual art
- Notable work: Systemic Necropolis

Zanele-Anne Mutema (born 2 November 1988) is a Zimbabwean printmaker, photographer, sculptor and videographer. She has drawn particular international attention for her interactive immersive art. These works use technology and engage multiple senses, transporting audiences into a living artwork where they become active participants. Her artworks often make use of simple everyday cast-away domestic objects, which are re-contextualized and given new bio-associative meanings.

Mutema was included in the 2025 group exhibition All About Eve at the Kristin Hjellegjerde Gallery in London. She has also exhibited internationally at the Toronto Biennial of Art in Canada in 2022, Artissima in Turin, Italy, in 2022 and 2024 and the Investec Cape Town Art Fair in South Africa in 2024.

== Early life and education ==
Zanele-Anne Mutema was born in 1988 in Harare, Zimbabwe. Her early work developed from an interest in visual art, material practice and time-based media. She later became interested in making installations that bring audiences and objects together.

Mutema studied cinematography at the Zimbabwe Institute of Photography and Cinematography in 2009. She graduated from the National Gallery Visual Art Studio in 2010. After graduating, she spent several years developing an installation approach through experimentation. Her work is based on space, memory and phenomenology and on the creation, capture and recreation of events in relation to self, culture and history.

== Exhibitions ==
Mutema has exhibited her work in Zimbabwe before exhibiting internationally. In 2013, she took part in the Afiriperforma Biennale in Harare and the group exhibition In Black and White at First Floor Gallery Harare. She also exhibited her work at Uncharted Territories – Voices in Colour in Bulawayo; the No Limits exhibition at the Harare International Festival of the Arts; the RAVY Festival at Galerie d'Art Contemporain in Cameroon; and Woman at the Top at the National Gallery of Zimbabwe in 2014.

Mutema has since exhibited her work in Zimbabwe and internationally, including at First Floor Gallery Vic Falls in Victoria Falls, Zimbabwe, for Level – Mosi-oa-tunya (2020) and Vacancy: Zanele Mutema/Miriro Mwandiambira (2021); First Floor Gallery Harare for RE: Zacharaha Magasa/Zanele Mutema (2020), Ranezuro Rangu Ngariziye (2022), Paper Weight (2023), and Soft Equinoctial (2023); the Toronto Biennial of Art in Toronto, Canada (2022); FNB Art Joburg in Johannesburg, South Africa (2022); Artissima in Turin, Italy (2022); and the Investec Cape Town Art Fair in Cape Town, South Africa (2024) and the Investec Cape Town Art Fair in Cape Town, South Africa (2024).

== See also ==
- Contemporary African art
- Installation art
