= National Arts Council of Zimbabwe =

The National Arts Council of Zimbabwe (NACZ) is the official arts council for Zimbabwe. They award the annual National Arts Merit Awards (NAMA) in recognition of outstanding achievements in the arts and culture.
