= Kudzanai Chiurai =

Zimbabwean art and activist (born 1981)

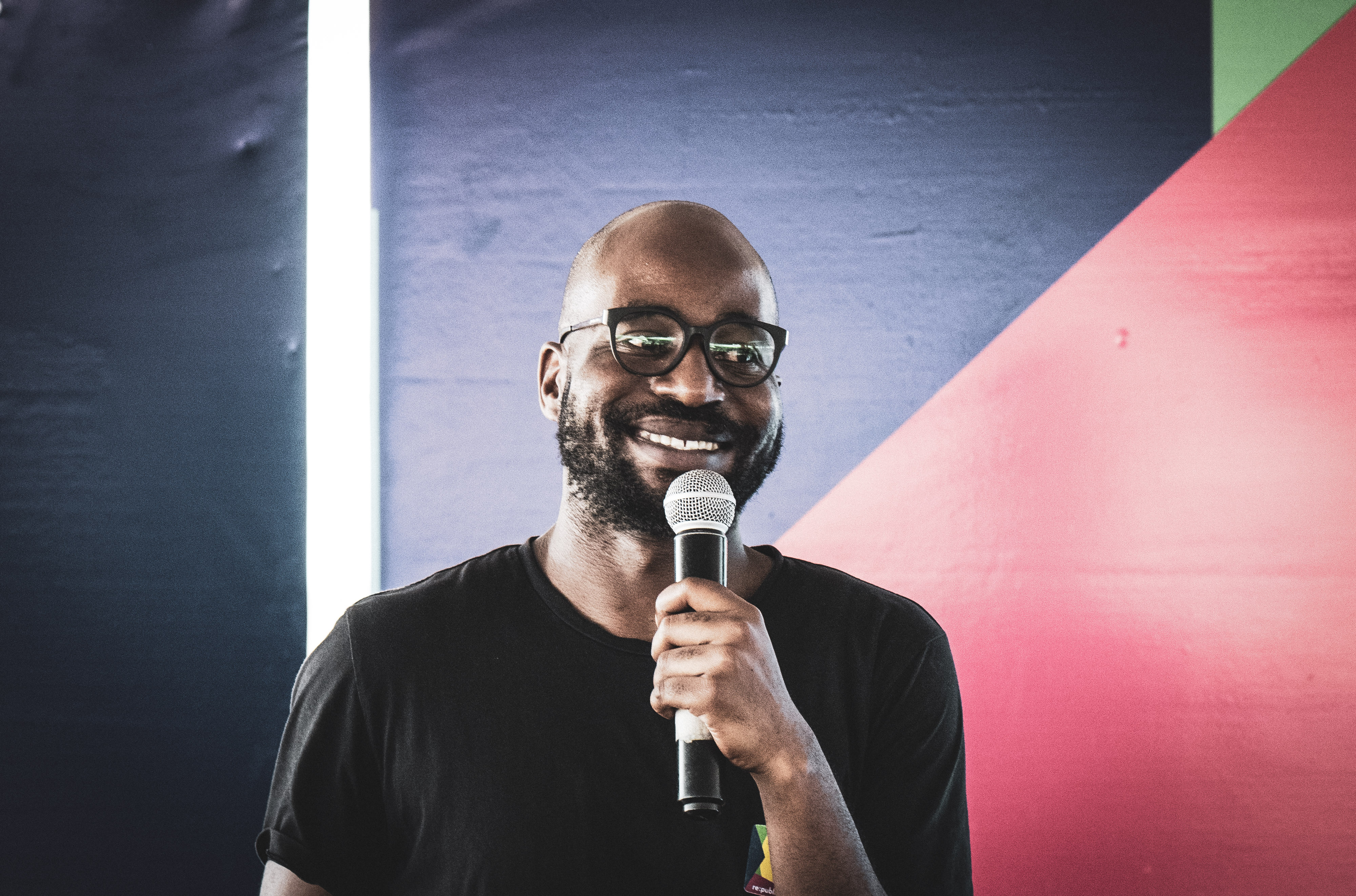
- Chiurai in 2018
- Born: 1981 (age 44–45); Harare, Zimbabwe
- Occupations: Artist and activist
- Years active: 2003 – present
- Awards: FNB Art prize

Kudzanai Chiurai (born 1981) is a Zimbabwean artist and activist. His repertoire of art combines the use of mixed media which involves the use of paintings, drawings, videos and photographs to address and tackle social, political and cultural issues in Zimbabwe.

Since his first solo exhibition in 2003, his artworks have been exhibited in the Museum of Modern Art in New York City, Museum für Moderne Kunst in Frankfurt, Victoria and Albert Museum in London, and documenta in Kassel, Germany. Forbes listed him among "Thirteen Africans To Watch In 2013". In 2015, he was named among the "15 Young African Creatives Rebranding Africa" by Forbes.

Kudzanai is not only an artist but also a poet, an activist and a cultural philosopher who addresses social and political injustices in Zimbabwe. Kudzanai is not known as a photographer, but he collaborates with other photographers to diversify the studio photography.

== Life and career ==
Chiurai was born in 1981 in Harare, Zimbabwe, but spent most of his later years in South Africa where he became the first black student to graduate with a bachelor's degree in Fine Art from the University of Pretoria. Kudzanai is also considered as part of the "born-free" generation since he was born one year after the independence of Zimbabwe.

He started his career by painting landscapes and portraits until he left his country Zimbabwe for South Africa where he developed an interest in using art as a form of activism. In 2004, Chiurai went on a self-imposed exile after he received arrest threats following his exhibition of Rau Rau and the Battle of Zimbabwe, two controversial artworks that depicted Robert Mugabe as a demonic figure during the build-up to the 2008 Zimbabwean general election.

In 2012, his short still film Iyeza was screened during the 2013 Sundance Film Festival.

Kudzanai was a winner of the FNB art prize in South Africa

== Style ==
Kudzanai uses masculinity and power as a style and framework in most of his artwork to represent the political ambiguity in South Africa. The idea of masculinity and power is also demonstrated in one of his group exhibitions entitled "The Black President", "The Minister of Enterprise" and "Dying to be men".

Kudzanai uses art to depict his surroundings such as urban shops in Johannesburg and the fact that he focuses on the city of South Africa in most of his artwork.

== Art work ==
Kudzanai created a group of posters named 'Conflict Resolution' that exhibit the topics of dispute and violence, along with the ways people solve these disputes.

He used digital photography and printing to create these posters titled "Conflict Resolution" which talks about the social and political issues in South Africa

Kudzanai's video work is displayed on the walls at the Zukerman Museum of in which the video deals with the gap between Western views of Africa and the realities of the continent of Africa.

The idea of globalization is also incorporated into his artworks.

== Exhibitions ==
=== Solo exhibitions ===
- 2003: The revolution will not be televised, Brixton Art Gallery, London
- 2013: 16SNLV, Newtown, Johannesburg, South Africa
- 2015: Selections From Revelations, Museum of Contemporary African Diaspora Arts, Brooklyn
- 2016: Kabbo Ka Muwala / The Girl’s Basket, National Gallery of Zimbabwe

=== Group exhibitions ===
- 2005: Reconciliation, University of Pretoria
- 2008: Africa Now, Round Tower, Copenhagen; Northern Norway Art Centre, Lofoten, Norway; and Tampere art museum, Finland
- 2009: Us, Johannesburg Art Gallery
- 2010: SPace, MuseuMAfricA, Johannesburg, South Africa
- 2011: Impressions from South Africa, 1965 to Now, Museum of Modern Art, New York
- 2011: über(W)unden – Art in troubled times, Goethe-Institut South Africa
- 2011: Figures & Fictions: Contemporary South African Photograph, Victoria and Albert Museum, London.
- 2011: Art Basel: Miami Beach, Miami, Florida, USA
- 2011: Ars 11 at Kiasma, Helsinki, Finland
- 2012: dOCUMENTA (13), Kassel, Germany

== See also ==
- Gerald Machona
- Kudzanai-Violet Hwami
- Moffat Takadiwa
- Masimba Hwati
- Netsai Mukomberanwa
- Tapfuma Gutsa
- Charles Fernando
- Dominic Benhura
- Amanda Shingirai Mushate

== General references ==
- Dreyer, Elfriede. "Dystopia in Kudzanai Chiruai's Representation of Globalising Johannesburg.", Representation and Spatial Practices in Urban South Africa, edited by Leona, Farber, Research Centre, Visual Identities in Art and Design, 2008, pp. 146–155.
- Klein, Melanie. "Between History, Politics and the Self: Photographic Portraiture in Contemporary Art from Africa." Listening to Africa. Anglophone African Literatures and Cultures, edited by Jana Gohrisch and Ellen Grünkemeier, Heidelberg, 2012, pp. 69– 9.
- Brown, Carol (September 2011). "Recent Acquisitions at Two South African Collections: UNISA and Durban Art Gallery". African Arts. 44 (3): 76–83. doi:10.1162/afar.2011.44.3.76. S2CID 57562985.
- The Divine Comedy: Heaven, Purgatory and Hell Revisited by Contemporary African Artists. Edited by Ambrožič Mara and Simon Njami, Kerber, 2014.
- Norman, Natasha (May 2013). "Taking the Road Less Travelled". Third Text. 27 (3): 400–406. doi:10.1080/09528822.2013.795699. S2CID 35497540.
- Mabuse, Nkepile. "Kudzanai Chiurai: The Artist Who Stood up to Mugabe." CNN, January 2015
- "Transitions: States of Being." Zuckerman Museum of Art.
- "Kudzanai Chiurai's Artwork." Digital Meets Culture, 12 March 2013.
