= Luis Meque =

Mozambican artist (1966-1988)

Luis Jose Meque Gugumise (10 April 1966 – 21 March 1998) was born in Province Tete, Mozambique, but started his art career in Zimbabwe where he moved when he was 20 years old because of civil war that was brewing in his home country. He became a major painter in Harare, but died young to AIDS.

== Awards ==
1994 – National Gallery of Zimbabwe – Award of Merit for painting, Harare, Zimbabwe

1993 – National Gallery of Zimbabwe – Overall award of distinction for painting, Harare, Zimbabwe

1992 – National Gallery of Zimbabwe – Prize for Weld Art, Harare, Zimbabwe

1989 – National Gallery of Zimbabwe – Highly commended (painting), Harare, Zimbabwe

== Workshops ==
1996 – Europe Africa Workshop, Germany

1995 – Genesis Workshop, Galerie Münsterland, Emsdetten, Germany

1991 – Pachipamwe Art Workshop, Marondera, Zimbabwe

1988–1989 – Student am B. A. T. Workshop, National Gallery of Zimbabwe

== Solo exhibitions (selected) ==
2001 – Luis Meque's Portfolio, Gallery Delta, Harare, Zimbabwe

2000 – Retrospective Exhibition II, Gallery Delta, Harare, Zimbabwe

1999 – Retrospective Exhibition I – Early, Middle and Late Works“, Gallery Delta, Harare, Zimbabwe

1998 – The Last Paintings Exhibition, Gallery Delta, Harare, Zimbabwe

1997 – The city, Gallery Delta, Harare, Zimbabwe

1996 – Life on the Line, Gallery Delta, Harare, Zimbabwe

1993 – Africa Africa, Gallery Delta, Harare, Zimbabwe

1992 – Paintings by Luis Meque & Sculpture by Christiane Stolhofer, Gallery Delta, Harare, Zimbabwe
