= First Floor Gallery Harare =

Coordinates: 17.8274°S 31.0479°E

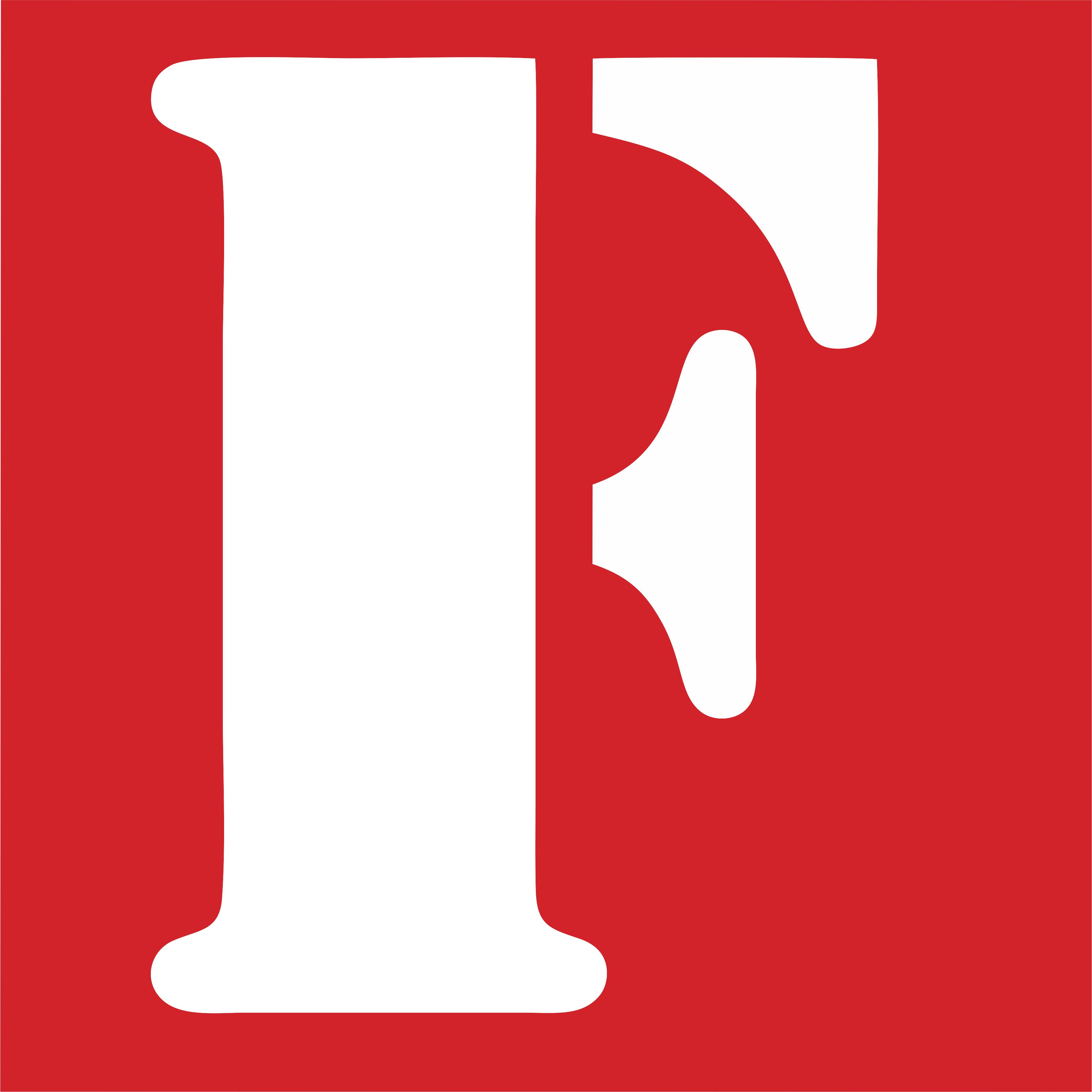
- Established: December 2009
- Location: Harare, Zimbabwe
- Type: art gallery
- Directors: Valerie Kabov and Marcus Gora
- Curator: Valerie Kabov
- Website: http://www.firstfloorgalleryharare.com/

First Floor Gallery Harare is an art gallery in Harare, Zimbabwe.

It is Harare's first artist run gallery, founded in 2009 and based in downtown Harare.

In 2021 they opened a new office and gallery in Victoria Falls, aiming to mentor and promote local artists.

== Notable artists ==
- Amanda Shingirai Mushate
