= Berry Bickle =

Zimbabwean artist (born 1959)

- Born: 1959 (age 66–67); Bulawayo, Southern Rhodesia (today Zimbabwe)
- Education: Durban Institute of Technology, Rhodes University
- Known for: installation art, Conceptual art, sculpture
- Awards: Rockefeller Foundation Creative Arts Fellow, 2010

Berry Bickle (born 1959) is a Zimbabwean artist who resides in Maputo. Born in Bulawayo, Bickle attended the Chisipite Senior School in Harare. Later, she attended the Durban Institute of Technology, where she obtained a national diploma in fine arts, and South Africa's Rhodes University, where she obtained a master's degree in fine arts. Bickle was a founding member of Bulawayo's Visual Artists' Association.

She divides her time between Zimbabwe and Mozambique, and her work explores the region's history of colonialism. In 1988, she and Tapfuma Gutsa organised the Pachipamwe workshop, the first Triangle Art Trust workshop organised in Africa. In 2010 she became a Rockefeller Foundation Creative Arts Fellow and she works at the Rockefeller Foundation Bellagio Center on the series Suite Europa.

== Work ==
Berry Bickle is a multimedia artist who works in installation, video, photography, and ceramics. Her works are generally installations, and are mixed media works which incorporate script; some include video and photography. Bickle has collaborated closely with the Zimbabwean ceramicist, Marjorie Wallace. She has collaborated with the Peruvian artist Adrian Velasquez. The exhibition and the publication Inscribing Meaning: Writing and Graphic Systems in African Art highlight the presence of texts in Bickle's work and the importance of the act of writing and of collecting words; in this frame, the artist labels her work "Re-Writes".

- "Maputo Utopias" series.
- Suite Europa, 2010. The series was produced during a residency at the Rockefeller Foundation Bellagio Center.
- Sleeping beauty, 2008
- Cyrene
- Inheritance lost library
- Wandering
- Sarungano
- Pessoa bowls series

== Exhibitions ==
Berry Bickle's work is exhibited internationally. In 2011, Bickle represented Zimbabwe at the Venice Biennale, at the time a rare appearance for an African nation. The Zimbabwean Pavilion, which was curated by Raphael Chikukwa, was titled "Seeing Ourselves".

- Zimbabwe/Tanzania: contemporary artists, Helsinki, 1993.
- 5th Havana Biennalle, Cuba, 1994.
- First Johannesburg Africus Biennale, 1995.
- On the Road, Africa95, London, England, 1995.
- MBCA-Decade of Award Winners, National Gallery, Harare, 1996.
- Artists against landmines, Franco/Mozambique Cultural Centre, Maputo, 1999.
- World Video Festival, Gates Foundation, Amsterdam, 1999.
- Artistes contemporains du Zimbabwe, Pierre Gallery, Paris, 1999.
- Women in African Art, Vienna, 1999.
- 2001 El tiempo de Africa, Centro Atlantico de Arte Moderno, Gran Canaria "Siyaphambili-2000," National Gallery, Harare, 2001.
- Art dans le Monde, Paris, 2001.
- Africas: The Artist and the City: A Journey and an Exhibition, Barcelona, Spain, 2002.
- Afrika Remix – Zeitgenössische Kunst eines Kontinents – Museum Kunst Palast, Düsseldorf, 2004.
- Visions of Zimbabwe – Manchester Art Gallery, Manchester (England), 2004.
- Africa Remix, Centre Pompidou, Paris, 2005.
- Textures – Word & Symbol in Contemporary African Art – National Museum of African Art, Washington, DC, 2005.
- Africa Remix – Contemporary Art of a Continent – Hayward Gallery, London (England), 2005.
- Body of Evidence (Selections from the Contemporary African Art Collection) – National Museum of African Art, Washington, DC, 2006.
- Africa Remix – Contemporary Art of a Continent – Mori Art Museum, Tokyo, 2006.
- 7ème Biennale de l'Art Africain contemporain – Dak'Art Biennale de l'art africain contemporain, exhibition curated by N'Goné Fall in the frame of the individual exhibitions, Dakar, 2006.
- Annual MUSART – Museu Nacional de Artes (MUSART), Maputo, 2007.
- Exit11, Limited edition Part 1 – Exit11, Grand-Leez, 2007.
- Africa Remix – Contemporary art of a continent – Johannesburg Art Gallery (JAG), Johannesburg, 2007.
- L'oeil-Écran Ou La Nouvelle Image – Casino Luxembourg – Forum d'art contemporain, Luxembourg, 2007.
- Exit11, Exhibition 02 – Collective exhibition – Exit11, Grand-Leez, 2007.
- Videozone 4 – Videozone – International Video-Art Biennial, Tel Aviv, 2008.
- Ifa-Galerie Berlin, Berlin, 2008.
- Chance encounters – Sakshi Gallery, Mumbai, 2008.
- Animais: Caracterização e Representação – Museu Nacional de Artes (MUSART), Maputo, 2008.
- Chance Encounters – Seven Contemporary Artists from Africa – Centre for Contemporary Art, Lagos (CCA, Lagos), Lagos, 2009.
- Maputo: A Tale of One City – Oslo Kunstforening, Oslo, 2009.
- Biennale di Venezia – 54th International Art Exhibition, Pavilion of Zimbabwe, exhibition Seeing Ourselves curated by Raphael Chikukwa, Venice, 2011.
- The Divine Comedy. Heaven, Purgatory and Hell Revisited by Contemporary African Artists, 2014 Museum für Moderne Kunst (MMK), Frankfurt am Main.

== See also ==
- Zimbabwean art

== Bibliography ==
- Gaël Teicher, Berry Bickle: plasticienne, Editions de l'Oeil, Paris, 2008.
- "A carta de Gaspar Vezoso I : TZR studies a painting by Berry Bickle", Zimbabwean Review 3 (2), April–June 1997: 1–2.
- A. J. Chennells, "Empire's offspring" in Gallery: the art magazine from Gallery Delta (7 March 1996): 3–6
- Peter S. Garlake, "Memory, mischief and magic in the country of my heart" in Gallery: the art magazine from Gallery Delta (17 September 1998): 22–25.
- Helen Lieros, "Earthãwaterãfire, recent works by Berry Bickle" in Gallery: the art magazine from Gallery Delta (11 March 1997): 20–21.
- Pierre-Laurent Sanner, "Berry Bickle" in Revue Noire 28 (March–April–May), 1998: 224–227.
