= Harare Polytechnic =

Polytechnic school in Zimbabwe

- Type: Government
- Established: 1 January 1919
- Founder: George Challoner
- Academic affiliations: Ministry of Higher and Tertiary Education
- Chairman: Dr Eng. T. Mudondo
- Location: P. O. Box CY 407, Causeway, Harare, Harare, Zimbabwe
- Language: English
- Colors: Blue
- Website: http://www.hrepoly.ac.zw/

Harare Polytechnic College, formerly Salisbury Polytechnic and commonly referred to as Harare Polytechnic, is a technical, public research university in Causeway, Harare. The university is known for its strength in science and engineering, and is one among a small group of technical schools or institutes of technology in Zimbabwe which are primarily devoted to the instruction of pure and applied sciences. The school was founded on the British polytechnic model offering standard and higher diplomas and undergraduate degrees, unlike European and American institutions which often offer postgraduate degrees and a strong emphasis on research. At the outset, the focus of polytechnics was on STEM subjects with a special emphasis on engineering.

== History ==
Salisbury Polytechnic was established in 1919 by George Challoner, credited as the "father" of technical education in Rhodesia, started mechanical engineering classes for a small group of young white men. Classes were held in various schools and halls until an official Polytechnic campus was established just before the Second World War on the site between Fourth and Fifth Streets in Harare, Zimbabwe.

By the time of the establishment of the Federation of Rhodesia and Nyasaland, the school expanded and though it technically allowed all students to attend following the example of the University of Zimbabwe, it was overwhelmingly dominated by white, male students due to tuition costs, discrimination and a stigma against female students in trade professions. At the time technical education in Southern Africa, lagged far behind that of Western Europe and the United States, with just three polytechnics across Rhodesia, in Salisbury, Bulawayo and Ndola and a handful of technikons in South Africa. In pre-war Rhodesia, the majority of demand for skilled technical labour, was in mining, particularly in on the Copperbelt, followed by gold, coal and chrome mining in the south. Lesser opportunities existed with Rhodesian Railways and in town planning and real estate, thus the bulk of skilled labour concentrated in the Witwatersrand and the emerging Copperbelt, putting the Southern Rhodesian economy at a distinct disadvantage.

In order to remedy this and prevent graduates from leaving for better opportunities abroad, the government began to invest in technical education. The federal government commissioned the Keir Report, the result of which led to all three governments, opening higher education to people of all races. The Garfield Todd government in turn, had recently liberalised education for African students and hoped that trade school would be an avenue of creating opportunities for Africans while also responding to the needs of an increasingly industrializing economy. The government sponsored a two-year diploma in fields as varied as engineering and town planning, with many students going on to study at institutions in the United Kingdom before returning to service the booming economy. As a result, the modern Harare Polytechnic commenced operations in 1964 at its present location after construction work, which cost 275,000 pounds. Increased funding also led to the first wave of Coloured (mixed-race), Asian and black students at the school, albeit as a small minority of the student body. Unfortunately, the election of Ian Smith led to a racist backlash that hindered African education until 1980.

== Degree offerings ==
The school offers degrees at the following levels:

- national higher certificate (2 years)
- national diploma (3 years).
  - 2 years of theoretical training, and
  - 1 year of experiential training with an industrial employer
- national higher diploma (4 years)
- bachelor's degree in technology (B-Tech: 4 years)
