= Amanda Shingirai Mushate =

Zimbabwean contemporary visual artist

- Born: 1995 (age 30–31); Bulawayo, Zimbabwe
- Education: National Gallery of Zimbabwe Visual Arts Studios
- Known for: Painting, sculpture
- Style: Abstract, contemporary

Amanda Shingirai Mushate (born 1995) is a Zimbabwean contemporary visual artist known for her abstract paintings and sculptural work. She has held solo exhibitions at institutions including the National Gallery of Zimbabwe and First Floor Gallery Harare, and participated in major international art fairs such as Art Dubai and Paris Internationale.

== Early life and education ==
Mushate was born in Bulawayo, Zimbabwe in 1995. She earned a National Certificate in Fine Art from the National Gallery of Zimbabwe Visual Arts Studios in 2016. She was mentored by Gresham Tapiwa Nyaude, which greatly influenced her vibrant abstract visual style.

== Style and themes ==
Her work features layered abstraction with looping linework and bold colours, reflecting emotional and social dynamics. Mushate cites Zimbabwean musicians James Chimombe and Paul Matavire as inspirations for the lyrical and rhythmic nature of her compositions. She often employs mixed media and sculptural interventions within her canvases to explore personal and communal memory.

== Career ==
Mushate's first solo exhibition, Hupenyu Hwangu Ndapedza Dzidzo (My Life End of Lessons) was staged in 2018 at First Floor Gallery Harare.

She has participated in several major group exhibitions, including:

- Only What Is Revealed Can Be Known, held at the National Gallery of Zimbabwe, Harare (March–May 2024), an all-female exhibition showcasing perspectives of seven Zimbabwean women artists.
- Rudo Rwunowuya Nemabasa, a joint exhibition with Tashinga Majiri at First Floor Gallery Harare (June 2023), exploring themes of love, creativity, and partnership.

In June 2025, she held her second major solo exhibition, Ingoma kaMama Wami? (A Song to My Mother), at the National Gallery of Zimbabwe. The show was described as a deeply personal tribute to motherhood, earning acclaim for its emotional resonance and visual strength.

Between 2022 and 2024, Mushate participated in prominent international exhibitions and fairs, including SCENORAMA (Pretoria), Paris Internationale (France), Investec Cape Town Art Fair, Art Dubai, FNB Art Joburg, Latitudes Art Fair, The Harare School (France), and In the Blood at Tiwani Contemporary (London).

In a 2024 article, CityLife Arts described Mushate as "establishing herself as a leading voice in contemporary Zimbabwean painting" and "an innovative young abstractionist with a growing international reputation."

NewsDay Zimbabwe also highlighted her growing appeal to international collectors, noting that her works are now housed in private collections in Cape Town, New York, Amsterdam, London and Paris.

== Reception ==
Mushate has been recognized in Zimbabwean media as an innovative young abstractionist with a growing international reputation. She is also noted as a role model for women artists balancing motherhood and professional practice within a male-dominated art sector. Her work is held in private collections across Harare, Cape Town, London, New York, Amsterdam and Paris.

== Personal life ==
Mushate is a mother and a vocal advocate for the increased visibility of female artists within Zimbabwe's contemporary art scene.

In 2023, she collaborated with fellow artist and partner Tashinga Majiri in a dual exhibition titled Rudo Rwunouya Nemabasa (Love Comes with Work) which explored themes of love, creativity and shared artistic practice within the context of their personal relationship.

== Selected exhibitions ==
Year	Exhibition	Venue / Location	Reference
2024	Only What Is Revealed Can Be Known	National Gallery of Zimbabwe, Harare	
2024	In the Blood	Tiwani Contemporary, London, UK	
2023	Rudo Rwunowuya Nemabasa (with Tashinga Majiri)	First Floor Gallery Harare, Zimbabwe	
2022	SCENORAMA	Javett Art Centre, Pretoria, South Africa	
2021	Nguve ine Muridzi (solo)	First Floor Gallery Harare, Zimbabwe	
2018	Hupenyu Hwangu Ndapedza Dzidzo (solo)	First Floor Gallery Harare, Zimbabwe	

== See also ==
- Portia Zvavahera
- Netsai Mukomberanwa
- Kudzanai Chiurai
- Grace Nyahangare
- Anne Zanele Mutema
