= List of Cameroonian artists =

The following list of Cameroonian artists (in alphabetical order by last name) includes artists of various genres, who are notable and are either born in Cameroon, of Cameroonian descent or who produce works that are primarily about Cameroon. See other articles for information on Cameroonian Culture.

== A ==
- Ateu Atsa (c. 1840–1910)

== K ==
- Pascal Kenfack (born 1950)
- Koko Komégné (born 1950)

== L ==
- Goddy Leye (1965–2011)
- Salifou Lindou (born 1965)

== M ==
- Soraya Milla (born 1989), French-born of Cameroonian descent independent filmmaker
- Joël Mpah Dooh (born 1954)

== N ==
- Ibrahim Njoya (cc. 1890–1966)
- Anne-Marie Nzié (1932–2016)

== P ==
- Petit Pays (born 1967)

== R ==
- Tracey Rose (born 1974), worked in Cameroon

== S ==
- Joseph-Francis Sumégné (born 1951)
- Sabrina

== T ==
- Pascale Marthine Tayou (born 1967)
- Sam Fan Thomas (born 1952)
- Barthélémy Toguo (born 1967)

== Y ==
- Hervé Yamguen (born 1971)

== Groups ==
- Cercle Kapsiki (Hervé Yamguen, Hervé Youmbi, Salifou Lindou, Blaise Bang, Jules Bertrand Wokam). The collective Cercle Kapsiki was created in 1998 by five artists (Blaise Bang, Salifou Lindou, Jules Wokam, Hervé Yamguen et Hervé Youmbi) with the specific aim of producing urban interventions and encouraging the debate on the role of art in the urban space. In 2003 they promoted the international workshop Scenographie Urbaine in the neighbourhood of New-Bell in collaboration with Scur&°k.
- Art days and Kobaliq, Douala. Salif Ngounga created this association to promote contemporary art in Cameroon, organize workshops for artists and curate exhibitions in collaboration with Le Carré des Artistes.
- Mbamboul'art. The association Mbamboul’art was funded in 2004 by a collective of artists, writers and dancers (among which Cédric Dibandjo, Eric Owam and Guy Rodrigue Belegue) in the neighborhood of New Deïdo, Douala. The collective organises workshops with artists and young people and encourages the debate on the development of contemporary art practices in Douala.

== Dealers ==
=== Art critics and curators ===
- Marilyn Douala Bell (born 1957)
- Simon Njami (born 1962)

=== Art centers and galleries ===
- doual'art, Douala
- Galerie MAM, Douala. Marème Malong Meslin Samb founded Galerie Mam in 1995. In 2005, Malong established a partnership with MTN Foundation. The gallery has three main programme-areas: exhibits contemporary artists in Douala and in international art platforms such as Dak’art, organizes workshops for children and encourages emerging artists through residency programmes in Bonendale, Douala. rue Tobie Kuoh, Bonanjo, Douala, B.P. 40 Douala, Cameroon.
- Atelier Viking, Douala. Artist Viking Kanganyam André founded atelier Viking in March 1976 to promote contemporary art in Cameroon. Viking taught visual arts (painting, sculpture, graphic art, drawing and serygraphy) to young artists encouraging them to explore the potentialities of all media and to transform materials found in loco. Since 2001, atelier Viking has been mostly employed for exhibitions such as Sweet Again (2002) and Yann and Co (2001). Rue Jamot face Garage Technique Auto, Bessengue, Douala.
- ArtBakery, Bonendale, Douala. Founded in 2002 by Goddy Leye in the village of Bonendale a few kilometers from Douala, it offers trainings for emerging artists (Master Class) and journalists (Art Daily) as well as residency programs for young artists (Portfolio). The program Bakery supports artists with the technical development of multimedia works of art.
- Bonapriso Art Center (BC Arts). In the last fifteen years, Annie Kadji has been active in the art scene of Douala promoting contemporary arts through workshops and art courses. The actual gallery space in Bonapriso was created in 2004.Since then, BC Arts has organised exhibitions of contemporary art (Art Convention Esprit Contemporain 2005; Signature 2006; Exposition de Fammes 2006; Signatures les péres de la peinture camerounaise), artefacts (Artisanats du monde) and objects of interior design. Most recently, BC Arts has hosted the second edition of DUTA (Douala Urban Touch of Arts 2007). Near Rue Njo-Njo, Bonapriso, B.P. 13001 Douala Cameroon.
- Art Wash. Founded in 2003 by Dou Essoukan and Koko Komégné, it functions as personal atelier, art centre and laboratory. It staged a two weeks workshop in 2001 and 2002 – Squat’art. The idea behind Squat’art was to promote young artists who did not have the possibility of exhibiting in commercial galleries. Indeed, the paucity of galleries in Douala in the 1990s prevented emerging artists from gaining visibility and experience. The first Squat’art took place in Bali in January 2001 and involved more than twenty artists. The second edition, which was a tribute to the artist Kuoh Eyango, was organised in Deïdo from 4 to 17 February. The organising committee, led by Komégné, Essoukan and Viking invited over forty artists who produced and exhibited original works. Degrando Boutique, Deïdo, Douala, Cameroon.
- Espace Créateur. It was inaugurated by Made Jong in 2005 in Akwa, Douala. This space functions as a window for the couture produced in Jong's atelier and emerging artists who wish to exhibit. Since the 1990s Made Jong has designed events to promote contemporary fashion and art with a specific sensibility to women's rights and history (Carnival, Images des Reines since 2004; L’Art dans la Rue since 2004; Reines d’Afrique 1995). 40 rue Drout, Akwa, B.P. 17 Douala, Cameroon, 40 rue Drout, Akwa.
- Galerie Keuko. It was created in 2002 by Richard Keuko to promote contemporary art from Cameroon, organising group and solo exhibitions (Etienne Maurice 2006; Koko &Co. 2006; Confluences 2005; Impulsions 2005). They are currently working to establish a training programme for young artists. B.P. 24246 Douala, Cameroon, Rue Lottin Same, Akwa, Douala.
- Le Carré des artistes. Veronique Aubry inaugurated Carré des artistes in 2004. Since then, Salif Ngounga has designed its artistic programme organising exhibitions (Couleurs et femmes 2007; Pirogue de Noël 2006; Fantasmes en bleu 2005) and atelier promoting artists in Douala. 50, rue Batibois Sortie du parking Score, Bonapriso, B.P. 15432 Douala Cameroon.
- Photo Prunet, Douala. Photo Prunet was founded in 1952 by the photographer George Prunet, who was working in Douala for international enterprises. Accordingly, his photos document the urban development of the city starting from the 1950s. The photo archive, which is not yet digitalized, includes up to 100.000 negatives and can be consulted by the public.

==== Other cultural institutions ====
- Maison des Jeunes et de la Culture (New Bell and Bonamoussadi). Cardinal Christian Tumi founded the first MJC (Maison des Jeunes et de la Culture) 18 February 1995 in the neighbourhood of Akwa as a result of the collaboration between the Archidiocèse of Douala and COE (Centro Orientamento Educativo). Throughout the years, the MJCs have become a successful meeting place for the dwellers of Douala, and specifically youths who are involved in trainings and artistic projects. Indeed, the MJC have 350 members with up to 1000 people benefiting each week. New Bell: near la Paroisse Notre Dame de Victoire, Bonamoussadi: near la Paroisse Notre Dame de l’Annonciation.
- Maison de la Culture Jevais (Bepanda Omnisport). The building is currently under construction. Françoise Colas, coordinator of the Project Jevais (Jeunesse et vie associative pour l’insertion sociale) is responsible of the project. Bepanda Omnisport, Douala, Cameroon.
- CCF – Centre Culturel français de Douala Blaise Cendrars. Directed by Mangin Benoît, the CCF promotes cultural and artistic events in the city of Douala such as: cinema, conferences, exhibitions, residency programmes, training for youth, prizes, publishing house. 61 bis Bd de la Liberté BP 01 Akwa Douala, Cameroon.

=== Cultural initiatives focussed on visual arts ===
- SUD Salon Urbain de Douala
- Bessengue City. The project Bessengue City was designed and coordinated by Goddy Leye. It took place in Bessengue, Douala in October 2002. James Beckett launched an experimental radio (Radio Bessengue City); Jesus Palomino ideated a shelter using local materials; Goddy Leye produced an art installation with portraits; and Hartanto designed the website.
- DUTA: Douala Urban Touch of Arts, Biennale des Arts Visuels. The Association Zoom launched the first edition of DUTA in 2005. It aimed at promoting artists from the African continent and its diaspora. During ten days, painting, sculpture, installations and videos are exhibited throughout the city of Douala within major institutions. DUTA recurs every two years.
- Exit Tour. In occasion of Dak’art 2006, seven artists (i.e. Ginette Daleu, Justine Gaga, Dunja Herzog, LucFosther Diop, Achilleka, Alioum Moussa, Goddy Leye) departed from Douala and reached Dakar using only public transportation. During the three-months journey, the artists visited galleries, artists and participated to workshops. This project was initiated by Art Bakery.
- Scénographies Urbaines de Douala. From 16 December 2002 to 5 January 2003, the cercle Kapsiki in collaboration with Scur&°k, invited more than twenty artists from Africa and Europe to realise installations and performances in the neighborhood of New Bell, Douala.

=== Art magazines ===
- Bakwa. An online and off-line magazine which covers cultural issues like art, photography, music, literature, fashion, cinema, and has a penchant for long-form creative nonfiction, reportage and literature. Inspired by magazines such as PalaPala and Chimurenga, Bakwa grew out of the need to fill the lacuna of cultural and literary magazines in Cameroon, and champions a new dynamic Africa (at home as well as in the diaspora), the one often ignored by Western traditional media. It was created in 2011 by Dzekashu MacViban.
- DiARTgonale. Quarterly panafrican journal dedicated to contemporary art in Africa. Directed by the artist Achillekà Komguem, it was founded in 2007 and it is distributed in Cameroon. It is published by ARTCE (Association Art pour la Conscientisation et l’Education) with the support of Lamia MEDDEB, Suisse.Yaoundé, Cameroon B.P. 513.
- PalaPala. Defunct quarterly panafrican online magazine which focused on art and culture from Africa and its diaspora. It was operational between 2008 and 2011 and was started by Cameroonian born writers, Dibussi Tande and Kangsen Feka Wakai as well as Nigerian born artist Abidemi A. Olowonira.

== See also ==
- Culture of Cameroon
