= Doual'art =

Cameroonian non-profit organization

doual'art
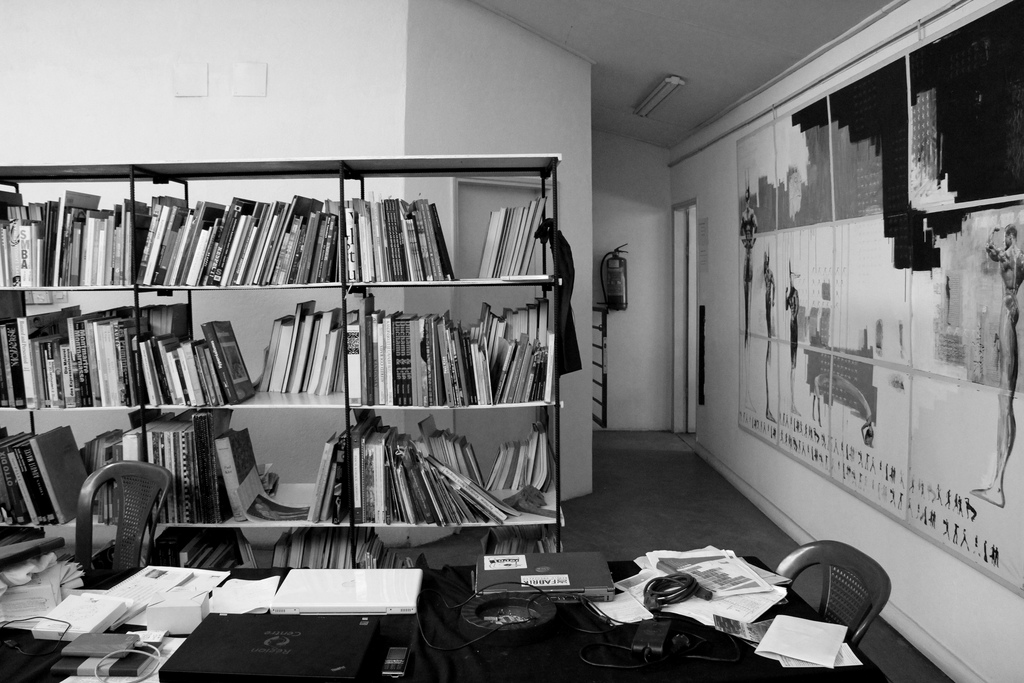
- Established: 1991
- Location: Place du Gouvernement; Bonanjo Douala, Cameroon
- Type: Contemporary Art
- Director: Marilyn Douala Bell
- Curator: Didier Schaub
- Website: doual'art

Doual'art is a non-profit cultural organisation and art centre founded in 1991 in Douala, Cameroon and focused on new urban practices of African cities.

== History ==
doual'art was registered as a non profit organization in 1992 and it was established by Marilyn Douala Bell and Didier Schaub. In 1995 they created Espace doual'art, an exhibition space and gallery in the neighbourhood of Bonanjo in Douala. In 1996 they produced La Nouvelle Liberté by Joseph-Francis Sumégné, considered a landmark in Douala. In 2005 they organized the first Ars&Urbis event, an international symposium to foster discussion and theory about the contribution of art to urban transformation. The event led to the establishment of the SUD Salon Urbain de Douala, a triennial exhibition focused on public art. In December 2007 it launched the first edition of the SUD Salon Urbain de Douala. In December 2010 the second edition of SUD Salon Urbain de Douala took place. The salon produces the itinerant exhibition Making Douala 2007-2013 which was presented in 2012 at the International Architecture Biennale Rotterdam within its official programme, at the Dakar Biennale as an off event and on Lucas Grandin's website In 2013 it participated at Art Dubai doual'art by exhibiting the artists Em’kal Eyongakpa, Boris Nzebo and Joseph-Francis Sumégné and by representing the artists Romuald Dikoumé, Justine Gaga, Haco Hankson, Aser Kash, Koko Komégné, Salifou Lindou, Hervé Yamguen and Hervé Youmbi.

== Governance ==
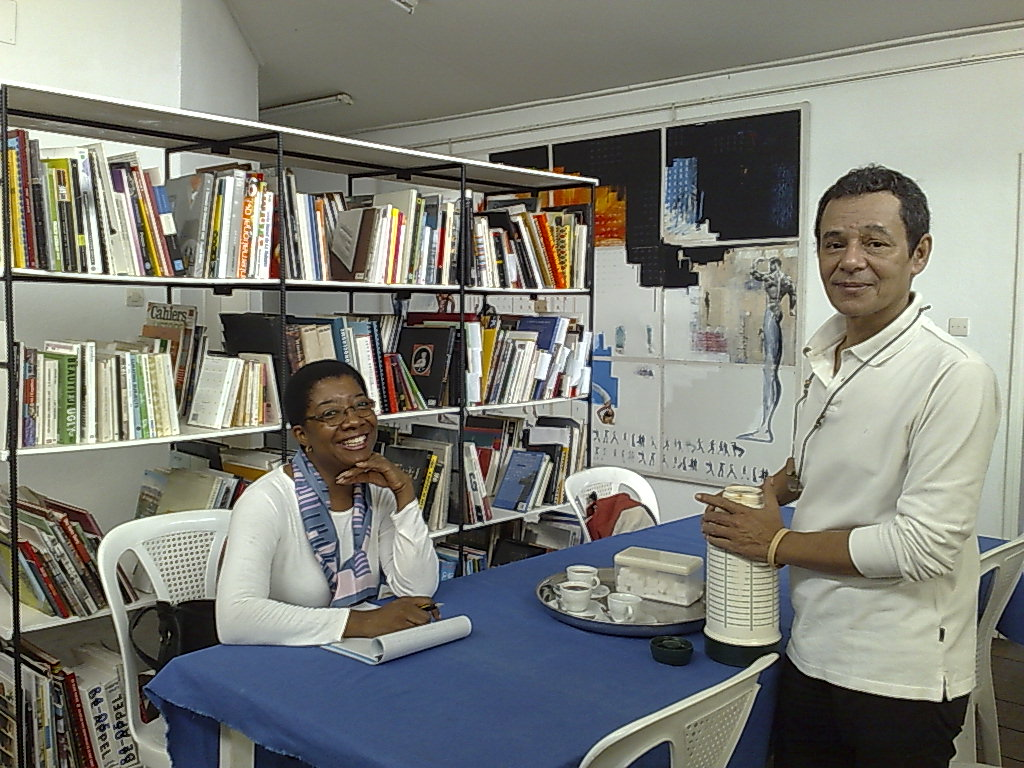
Marilyn Douala Bell and Didier Schaub.

doual'art is directed by its president Marilyn Douala Bell (and its artistic director Didier Schaub until his death in 2014). The institution is an independent non profit organization which develops its activities and projects with the support of partners, international grant-makers and sponsors.

In producing site-specific urban interventions, doual'art works as an intermediary between social and economic actors, population and local collectives. It perceives cultural and artistic initiatives as a tool for consolidating freedom of expression and social cohesion, which allow in their turn transcending and overcoming closures and cleavages. doual'art implements a participatory approach to cultural practice, negotiating with local communities, NGOs and authorities their specific needs and aspirations and involving artists as facilitators of the development processes.

The exhibition space has presented works by Pascale Marthine Tayou, Goddy Leye, Alioum Moussa, Koko Komégné, Joseph-Francis Sumégné, AchilleKà, Bili Bidjocka, Lucas Grandin, Khaled Hafez, Christian Hanussek, Aser Kash, Bill Kouelany, Frédéric Keiff, Faouzi Laatiris, Salifou Lindou, Michèle Magema, Malam, Joël Mpah Dooh, Younès Rahmoun, Tracey Rose, Kamiel Verschuren, Sue Williamson, Jules Wokam, Guy Wouete, Hervé Yamguen, Hervé Youmbi.

== Building ==
doual'art was initially established in 1991 without a fixed location, with the aim of producing site-specific artworks and projects in the different neighborhoods of Douala. In 1995 the Espace doual'art is created. The space was established in the former cinema of the Palace of Douala Kings, property of the family Douala Bell and located in Bonanjo, Place du Gouvernement. The architect Danièle Diwouta-Kotto restored the location and created offices, an exhibition space, a cafeteria and the outside garden. The Espace doual'art hosts meetings, conferences, exhibitions, projections, installations and performances. Douala is at the centre of the work of doual'art, also after the establishment of the Espace doual'art. Between 1991 and 2012 doual'art produces artworks in over 12 neighborhood of the city.

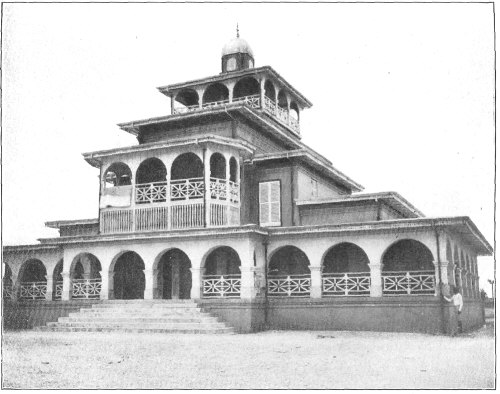
Photo Richard Harding Davis, c. 1902

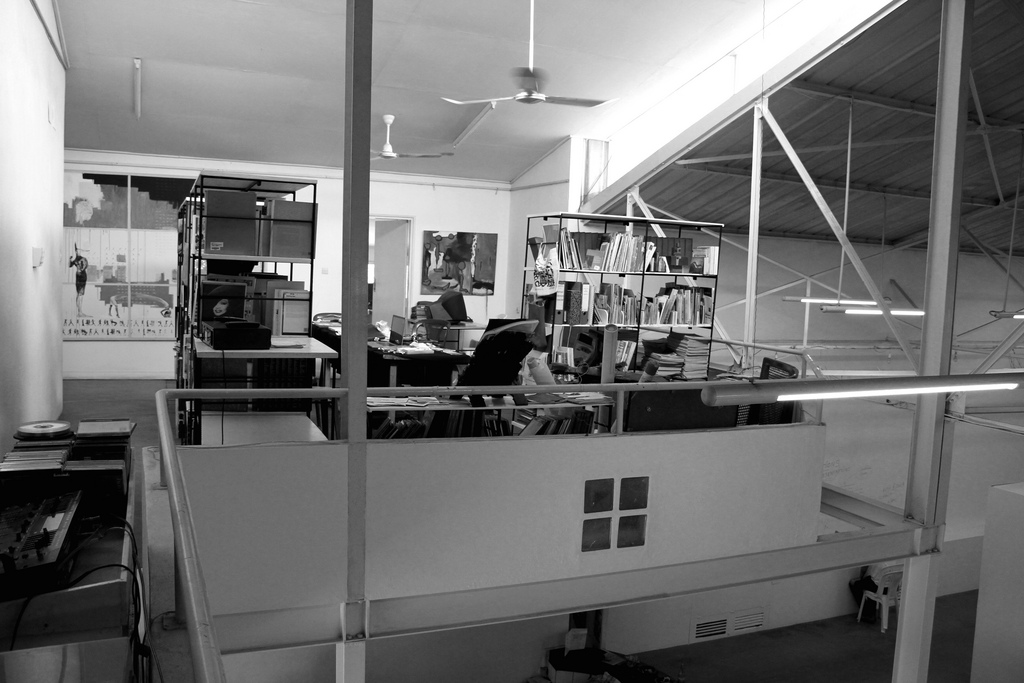

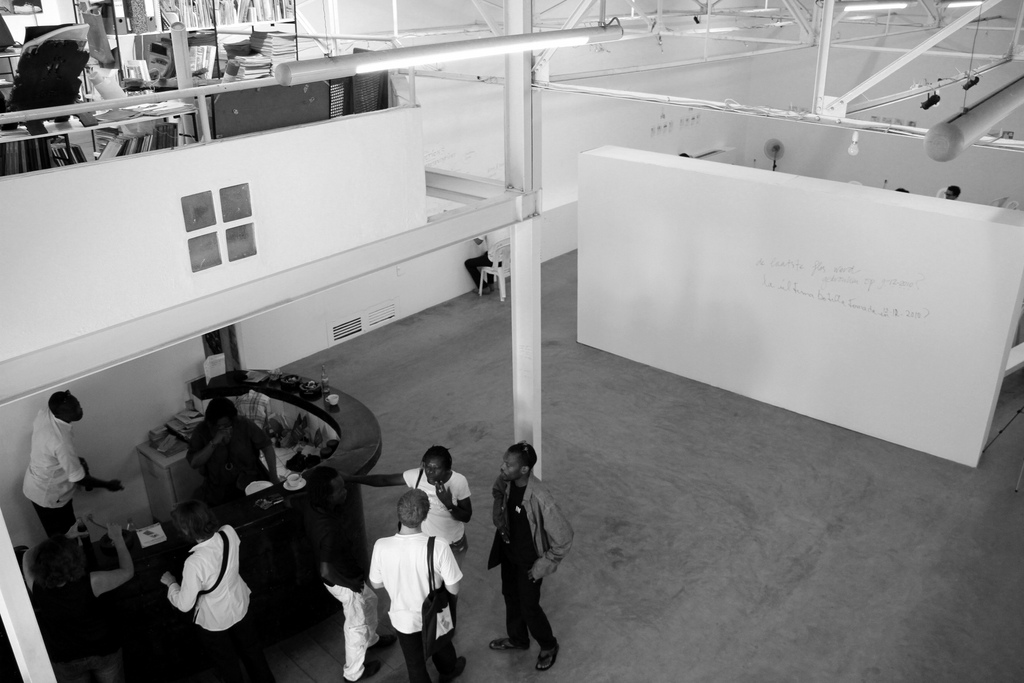

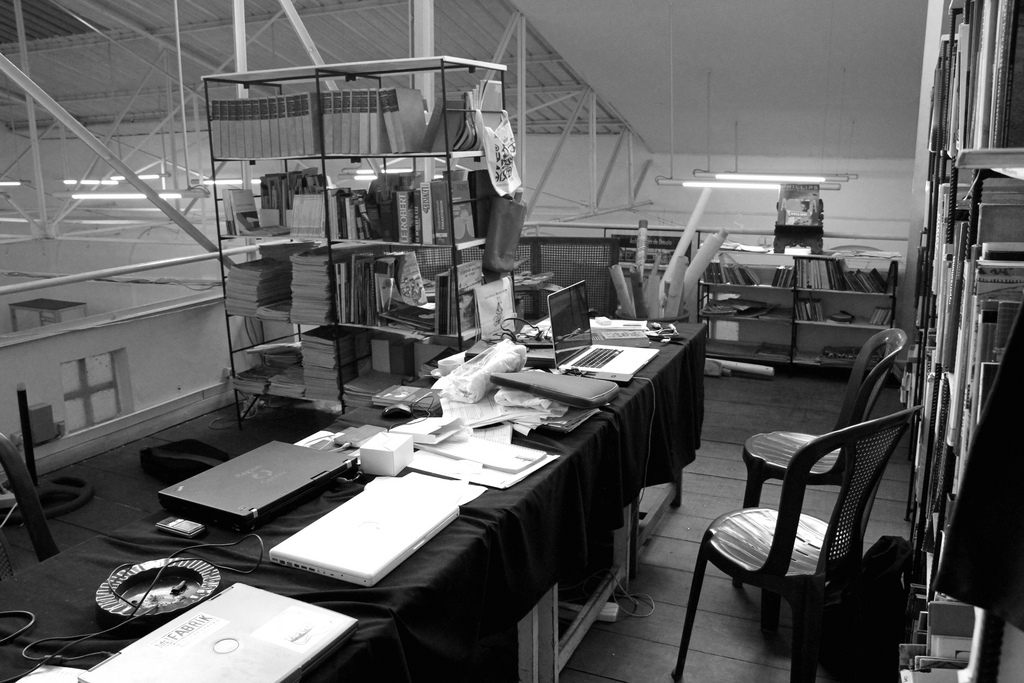

== Programme ==
The focus of doual'art is on contemporary art and urban transformations. Since 1991, the organization has exhibited and produced artworks of Cameroonian artists and it has invited contemporary artists of other nationalities to Douala in order to create a bridge between the city and contemporary art productions. The purpose of doual'art is to foster Douala's cultural and urban identity. Indeed, artistic creation is considered a trigger of change, a paradigm of development, and most crucially an effective means to fight indigence and poverty. Since 2007 doual'art organises the SUD Salon Urbain de Douala, a triennial cultural event which produces ephemeral and permanent contemporary art and public art for the city of Douala. The event takes place in December; the first edition of SUD is organized in 2007; the second in 2010; the third in 2013.

== Notability ==
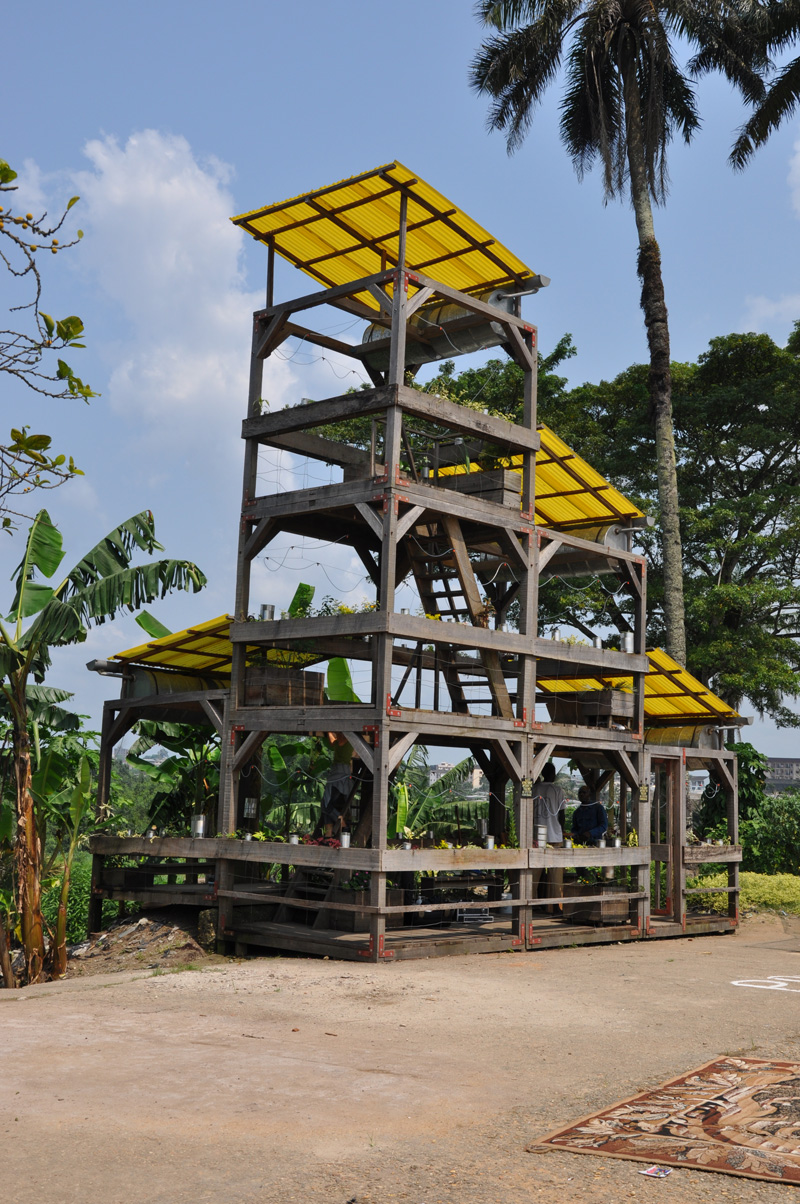
Lucas Grandin, Le jardin sonore (The sound garden), de Bonamouti, Bonamouti, Douala, 2010. Commissioned and produced by Doual'art for SUD-Salon Urbain de Douala 2010

Doual'art is described by the Prince Claus Fund as an "organisation that has revolutionized the art scene in Cameroon". Doual'art is part of several international networks including Artfactories and ArtsCollaboratory.

It is featured among the institutions of New Art Spaces Museum, The organisation and its activities have been supported among others by ICU Art Projects (since 2010), Enough Room for Space, Prince Claus Fund, Mondriaan Foundation, Hivos, ArtsCollaboratory - Doen Foundation.

== See also ==
- List of Cameroonian artists
- List of public art in Douala
