= SUD Salon Urbain de Douala =

Triennial festival of art held in Cameroon

- Genre: public art and contemporary art
- Begins: 2007
- Frequency: triennial
- Locations: Douala, Cameroon
- Years active: 2007, 2010, 2013, 2017
- Inaugurated: 2007
- Most recent: 2017
- Organiser: doual'art
- Website: http://www.salonurbaindedouala.org and http://www.doualart.org

The SUD Salon Urbain de Douala (meaning South - Urban Festival of Douala) is a triennial festival of public art and contemporary art organised in Douala, Cameroon. The festival had its first edition in 2007 and it is promoted by the art centre and cultural organisation doual'art.

== History ==
The SUD Salon Urbain de Douala was announced during the Ars&Urbis International Symposium organised in Douala in 2005 by doual'art; the Ars&Urbis focussed on the relationship between art and urban transformations and it was created as a preparatory research gathering for the SUD. At the end of 2005 is established in Rotterdam the iStrike Foundation (officially registered in 2006), which contributed to the start-up of the SUD and its first edition as a European office of doual'art. doual'art and iStrike Foundation organize together in 2007 the Ars&Urbis International Workshop, an event to produce and collect documentation about Douala and its cultural scene, which will be published in the book Douala in Translation. A View of the City and its Creative Transformative Potentials.

The first edition of the SUD Salon Urbain de Douala takes place as planned in December 2007 with the support among others of Arts Collaboratory, Mondriaan Foundation and the Prince Claus Fund. In 2008 the theme of water is chosen for the SUD Salon Urbain de Douala 2010. Meanwhile, a series of projects are developed within the frame of Liquid Projects.

In 2009 takes place the Ars&Urbis Curatorial Meeting, at the end of which Simon Njami is announced as new artistic director of the SUD 2010. In December 2010 the second edition of the SUD Salon Urbain de Douala took place in Douala.

== Organisation ==
The SUD Salon Urbain de Douala is structured into a triennial programme which produced site-specific ephemeral and permanent artworks located in different districts and neighborhoods of the city of Douala. The programme involves all the activities of doual'art and it includes a programme of artist-in-residence, exhibitions, the recurrent event Ars&Urbis, a meeting and think tank around the relationship between art and urban transformations and of course the triennial festival meant to give visibility to the public art produced and involve a wider public.

== Ars&Urbis ==
- Ars&Urbis International Symposium, organised in 2005. The symposium is the first gathering devoted to research and critical thinking around the relationship between art and urban transformations. It involves Remy Bazenguissa-Ganga, Hervé Béchy, Odile Blin, Danièle Diwouta-Kotto, N'Goné Fall, Goddy Leye, Dominique Malaquais, Philippe Mouillon, Alphaeus Mvula, Joseph Owona Ntsama, Iolanda Pensa, Oumar Sall, Abdoumaliq Simone, Béatrice Simonet, Mamadou Jean-Charles Tall, Nigel Tapela, William Wells, Sue Williamson and Águida Zanol.
- Ars&Urbis International Workshop, organized in 2007. The workshop focuses on producing and collecting documentation and interpretations of the city of Douala. It involves artists, intellectuals, journalists and researchers: Vincent Assiga, Lucia Babina, Edgar Cleijne, Sandrine Dole, Dodji Efoui, Jacques Epangue, Emiliano Gandolfi, Christian Hanusseck, AchilleKà, Abdellah Karroum, Aser Kash, Joë Kessy, Koko Komégné, Goddy Leye, Salifou Lindou, Lionel Manga, Aretha Louise Mbango, Same Mbongo, Alioum Moussa, Zayd Minty, Cheuping Njoya, Giulia Paoletti, Iolanda Pensa, Joseph Francis Sumégné, Kamiel Verschuren, Alexander Vollebregt, Jules Wokam, Hervé Yamguen and Hervé Youmbi.
- Ars&Urbis Curatorial Meeting, organized in 2009. The meeting is structured in a series of conferences, discussions and visits to the different neighborhoods of the city of Douala. It involves Martin Barlow, Adeline Chapelle, Marilyn Douala Bell, Michèle Ebongue, Martin Fouda, Eungie Joo, Kinsey Katchka, Mauro Alessandro Lugaresi, Lionel Manga, Benoît Mangin, Danièle Moudeke, Simon Njami, Iolanda Pensa, Olivier Priso, Jérôme Sans, Didier Schaub, Paulin Tchuenbou and Jean Yango.
- Ars&Urbis Meeting, organized in 2011

=== SUD2007 - Salon Urbain de Douala, first edition 2007 ===
The first edition of the SUD Salon Urbain de Douala took place in Douala between 9 and 16 December 2007, and it is promoted by doual'art in collaboration with the iStrike Foundation. The festival produces performances, installations and permanent artworks.

The performances are

- Bend Skins by Philippe Mouillon and Lionel Manga
- Le Zebu de Douala di Lucas Grandin
- Fantasia Urbaine by Pascale Marthine Tayou
- Ring by Collectif Autodafé

The public art temporary installations are

- Black Bodies Swinging by Michèle Magema
- Les Néons d'Amour by Hervé Yamguen
- Les 9 notables by Joseph Francis Sumégné

The permanent public art produced are

- L'Arbre à Palabres by Frédéric Keiff
- Sud-Obélisk by Faouzi Laatiris
- Paï by Baby Kouo Eyango
- La Nouvelle Liberté (completamento dell'opera) di Joseph Francis Sumégné
- Nje Mo Ye by Koko Komégné

==== Conferences and Documentation ====
The documentation of the event is prepared during the Ars&Urbis International Workshop and it is published in the book Douala in Translation presented at the opening of the festival. The first edition of the SUD 2007 is presented in the website of the Sawa people in an interview to Marilyn Douala Bell.

=== SUD2010 - Salon Urbain de Douala, second edition 2010 ===
Map of the public art projects presented during the SUD Salon Urbain de Douala 2010.

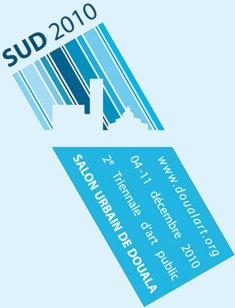

The second edition of the SUD Salon Urbain de Douala took place in Douala between 4 and 11 December 2010, and was sponsored by doual'art in collaboration with ICU art projects. The festival produced performances, installations and permanent artworks.

=== SUD2013 - Salon Urbain de Douala, 3rd edition 2013 ===
The 3rd edition from 3 to 10 December 2013, SUD2013, entitled "Douala metamorphoses", encouraged artists to transform the collective space, to work on the physical evolution of the common shared city sites and to liberate and create poles of encounters.

=== SUD2017 - Salon Urbain de Douala, 4th edition 2017 ===
The theme of the 4th edition of the SUD2017 is "The human dimension" and will take place from 5 to 10 December 2017.

In a context of dehumanization and disempowerment of youth and adults, doual'art hoped, by this 4th edition, to mark the city with artworks which interpret the Universal Declaration of the Human Rights and to start a dialog that helps to share ideas on a better way of living together.

== See also ==
- Biennale
- Douala
- Culture of Cameroon
- List of public art in Douala
