= Michèle Magema =

Congolese-French artist

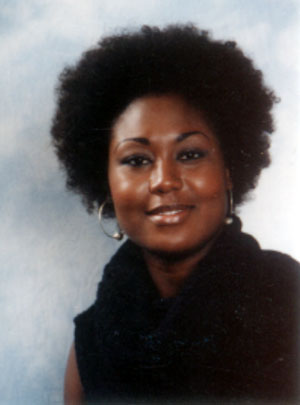
- Michèle Magema

Michèle Magema (born 1977) is a Congolese-French visual artist, known primarily for her video, performance, photography and drawing. Born in Kinshasa, DRC, she currently resides in Nevers, France. Magema's work considers memory, the multiplicity of histories, and temporality.

== Biography ==
Magema was born in Kinshasa, Zaire in 1977. She emigrated to Paris, France in 1984. Magema's father was politically active in France as a political refugee. In 2002, Michèle Magema received her MA in fine arts from l’Ecole Nationale Supérieure d’Arts de Cergy. After her graduation, she traveled to South Korea for a post-diploma residency, followed by an Ifritry residency in Morocco. In addition to being a resident artist at the Cité internationale des arts in Paris, she has participated in the Africa Remix Exhibition. Her work has been exhibited in the Global Feminisms exhibition at the Brooklyn Museum and the Hirshoron Museum and Sculpture Garden.

With a background in plastic art, Michèle Magema started her career as a painter. Then, she followed experimenting with video, performance, photography and finally mixing video with drawing and text. Currently, she is a multimedia interdisciplinary artist expressing herself mainly through video performance, where she overlaid different medias such as photography with drawing, drawing with video, and photo on lace. The art of Michèle Magema has been influenced by many disciplines and artists: in literature and poetry by Charles Baudelaire, Victor Hugo, Maya Angelou, Léopold Sédar Senghor, Edouard Glissant, and Frantz Fanon; in music by Billie Holiday; in experimental cinema by Antonioni, Fellini, Roberto Rossilini, Wim Wenders, and Ingmar Bergman, as well as from women artists like Pipilitorist, Cindy Sherman, Anna Mendieta, Eva Esse, Gina Pane, and Renée Green.

Michèle Magema's artworks are at the intermediary mental zone between individual histories, global history, and art history. She establishes a permanent dialogue between her own stories and souvenirs with the collective memory of the spectators by approaching different themes such as feminism, sociology, politics, and mythology. The presence or the absence of the body is always at the centre of her work.

Michèle Magema earned several art awards and professional achievements, among which the first prize of the Dakar Biennale in 2004 and the Yango Biennale IFAA prize in 2014. Some of her works are stored within private contemporary art collections, including Sindika Dokolo Collection in Luanda (Angola), Tervuren Contemporary Collection (Belgium) and the Artothèque Villeurbanne (France).

One of her most well-known works is Oyé Oyé, (2004) a two‐channel video installation, in which a woman (Magema) is shown marching in place on the left, while on the right historic footage of Zaire's Mobutu Sese Seko overseeing parades of Congolese cultural pride.

== Feminism ==
During Michèle Magema's time at École nationale supériere des Beaux-Arts (National School for Fine Arts) at Cergy, she was unable to find female Congolese artists from which to draw inspiration. This experience led her to decide to become a notable female Congolese artist herself. Magema's artwork contends with the notion of Afro-feminisms. She has shared that, in her conception of Afro-feminism, the matrilineal line holds significance—a value passed down from her own mother. She says that her work Mémoire Hévéa (translated from French as Rubber Tree Memory) explores this concept of feminist heritage. Magema subscribes to the idea of multiple fluid feminisms.

== Bibliography ==
- Africultures, Michèle Magema. http://www.africultures.com/php/?nav=personne&no=5261
- African digital art. The Video Artwork of Michèle Magema http://africandigitalart.com/2016/01/the-video-artwork-of-michele-magema/
- Signs journal (2005). Michèle Magema, Goodbye Rosa (2005). https://signsjournal.org/michele-magema-goodbye-rosa-2005-2005/
- Julie Crenn. Michele magema /// without echo, there is no meeting(2013). https://crennjulie.com/2013/01/11/michele-magema-without-echo-there-is-no-meeting-n-paradoxa-vol-31-2013/
- BrooklynMuseum (2010). Global Feminisms: Michele Magema. https://www.youtube.com/watch?v=O3QHF_1GVv0
- Muller, Dena (Winter 2008). "Reviewed Works: Global Feminisms by Maura Reilly, Linda Nochlin;
- Global Feminisms: New Directions in Contemporary Art by Maura Reilly, Linda Nochlin". Signs. 33 (2): 471–474. doi:10.1086/521560. JSTOR 10.1086/521560.
- Pensa, Iolanda (Ed.) 2017. Public Art in Africa. Art et transformations urbaines à Douala /// Art and Urban Transformations in Douala. Genève: Metis Presses. ISBN 978-2-94-0563-16-6

== Exhibitions ==
=== Individual ===
- 2015 : Michèle Magema CCF – 4th Lubumbashi Biennal (Lubumbashi, DRC)
- 2014 : Interstices – Galerie Saro Léon (Las Palmas, Gran Canaria)
- 2011 : Michèle Magema The Triptych – Jean-Marc Patras Galerie (Paris, France)

=== Collective ===
- Tramway Film Festival (Glasgow, Slotland)
- Opening Africa Museum, Permanent Collection (Tervuren, Belgium)
- Congo Stars, curated by Barbara Steiner – Kunsthaus Graz (Graz, Austria)
- I'm What I'm, curated by Julie Creen – Ici Gallery (Paris, France)
- SUD (Salon Urbain de Douala), curated by Cécile Bourne-Farell – Doual’art Art Space (Douala, Camerun)

=== Nordwind Festival ===
- YOUNG CONGO Nouvelle Génération d’Artistes Congolais by Kin Arts Studio – Institut Français (Kinshasa, DRC)
- AFIAC Des Artistes chez l’Habitant – FRONTIERES EFFRANGEES – FIAC (France)
- SELLING THE SHODOWS to support the subsistence, curated by Ingrid La Fleur and Ayana V. Jackson- Cgallery (Milan, Italy)
- AFRIQUES CAPITALES curated by Simon Njami, Gare Saint-Sauveur (Lille, France)
- LUCY’S EYE curated by Orlando Britto, CAAM (Las Palmas, Gran Canaria)
- SUD (Salon Urbain de Douala), curated by Cécile Bourne-Farell, Doual’art Art Space (Douala, Camerun)
- AN AGE FOR YOUR OWN MAKING, curated by Bonaventure Soh Bejeng Ndikung, (Roskilde and Copenhagen, Denmark)
- DAKAR BIENNAL « LA CITÉ DANS LE JOUR BLEU », curated by Simon Njami (Dakar, Senegal)
- 4th LUBUMBASHI BIENNAL « Réalités Filantes », curated by Toma Muteba, Museum of Lubumbashi (Lubumbashi, DRC)
- L’AFRIQUE A DU GENIE, curated by Ghitha Triki, 3rd International African Development Forum, Attijariwafa Bank Foundation (Casablanca, Morocco)
- SENTIMENTAL FINAL ACT, curated by Elise Atangana, Revue Noire Gallery (Paris, France)
- WHERE WE’ RE AT : OTHERS VOICES AND GENDER - Summer of Photography, curated by Christine Eyene, Bozar Museum (Bruxelles, Belgium)
- TOILES DE LUMIERES collection Saro Leon, curated by Orlando Britto, Casa Africa (Las Palmas, Canary Islands)
- Still Fighting Ignorance & Intellectual Perfidy Vidéo art from Africa, curated by Kisito Assangni, Pori Museum (Finland)
- 1st Casablanca Biennal (Casablanca, Marocco)
- SUREEL CONGO Kinshasa la ville des images, Art Museum of History and Culture (Dortmund, Germany)
- Still Fighting Ignorance & Intellectual Perfidy Vidéo art from Africa, curated by Kisito Assangni :
  - Contemporary Art Center (Moscow, Russia)
  - Torrance Art Museum (California, USA)
  - Lucca Museum (Italy)
  - Gallery Arena 1 (Los Angeles, California)
- COLOGNE OFF – Cologne International Video Art Festival (Cologne, Germany)
- UN CERTAIN CERCLE DE REGARD, Cité Internationale des Arts Gallery (Paris, France)
- ARCO MADRID 2010 with Arte Invisible (Madrid, Spain)
- A COLLECTIVE DIARY AN AFRICAN CONTEMPORARY JOURNEY, January to April 2010, Contemporary Art Museum of Herzliya (Herzliya, Israel)
- PANAFRICAN FESTIVAL, curated by Nadira Laggoune (Alger, Algeria)
- PARADE & PROCESSION here comes everybody, Parasol Unit (London, England)
- 16th International Art Video Festival of Casablanca (Casablanca, Morocco)
- NOTES FROM THE EMPIRE, Kunsthaus Dresden (Dresde, Germany)
- THE MESSENGER, 10/10 to 23/11, Cultur Center BRGGE (Bruge, Belgium)
- THE CINEMA EFFECT (Illusion Reality and the Moving Image), 19/06 to 07/09, Hirshhorn Museum and Sculpture Garden, (Washington, USA)
- DISTRITO LA REGENTA curated by Orlando Britto, La Regenta (Las Palmas, Canary Islands)
- ON PROCESSION, IMA (Indiannapolis, Indiana)
- FLOW, Studio Art Museum (Harlem, New York)
- SUD (Urban Salon of Douala), Space Doual’art (Douala, Cameroon)
- 7th BAMAKO AFRICAN PHOTOGRAPHY BIENNALE, curated by Simon Njami (Bamako, Mali)
- BLACK PARIS, Iwalewahaus (Bayreuth, Germany)
- AFRICA REMIX, curated by Simon Njami, June to August 2007 :
  - National Art Gallery (Johannesburg, South Africa)
  - Moderna Museet (Stockholm, Sweden)
  - Mori Museum (Tokyo, Japan)
  - Centre Georges Pompidou (Paris, France)
  - Hayward Gallery (London, England)
  - Kunst Palast Museum (Dusseldörf, Germany)
- 9th Havana Biennial, entitled « Urban Dynamic Culture » (Havana, Cuba)
- AFRICATTITUDES, 04/02- 19/03, Michèle Magema & Cheikh Niass, Maison du Livre, de l'Image et du Son (Villeurbanne, France)
- 5th BAMAKO AFRICAN PHOTOGRAPHY BIENNALE / DIFFUSION PROJECT 27/04- 04/05, - Cultural Center of Tehran (Teheran, Iran)
- BEAUTES AFRIQUES @ NANTES, Le Lieu Unique (Nantes France)
- LES AFRIQUES 31/03- 18/08, coproduction Tri Postale and Espace 251 Nord (Lille, France)
- 6th DAKAR BIENNALE, 1st Prize (Dakar, Senegal)
- 5th BAMAKO AFRICAN PHOTOGRAPHY BIENNALE (Bamako, Mali)

=== See also ===
- List of public art in Douala
