= Lionel Manga =

Cameroonian writer and cultural critic (1955–2024)

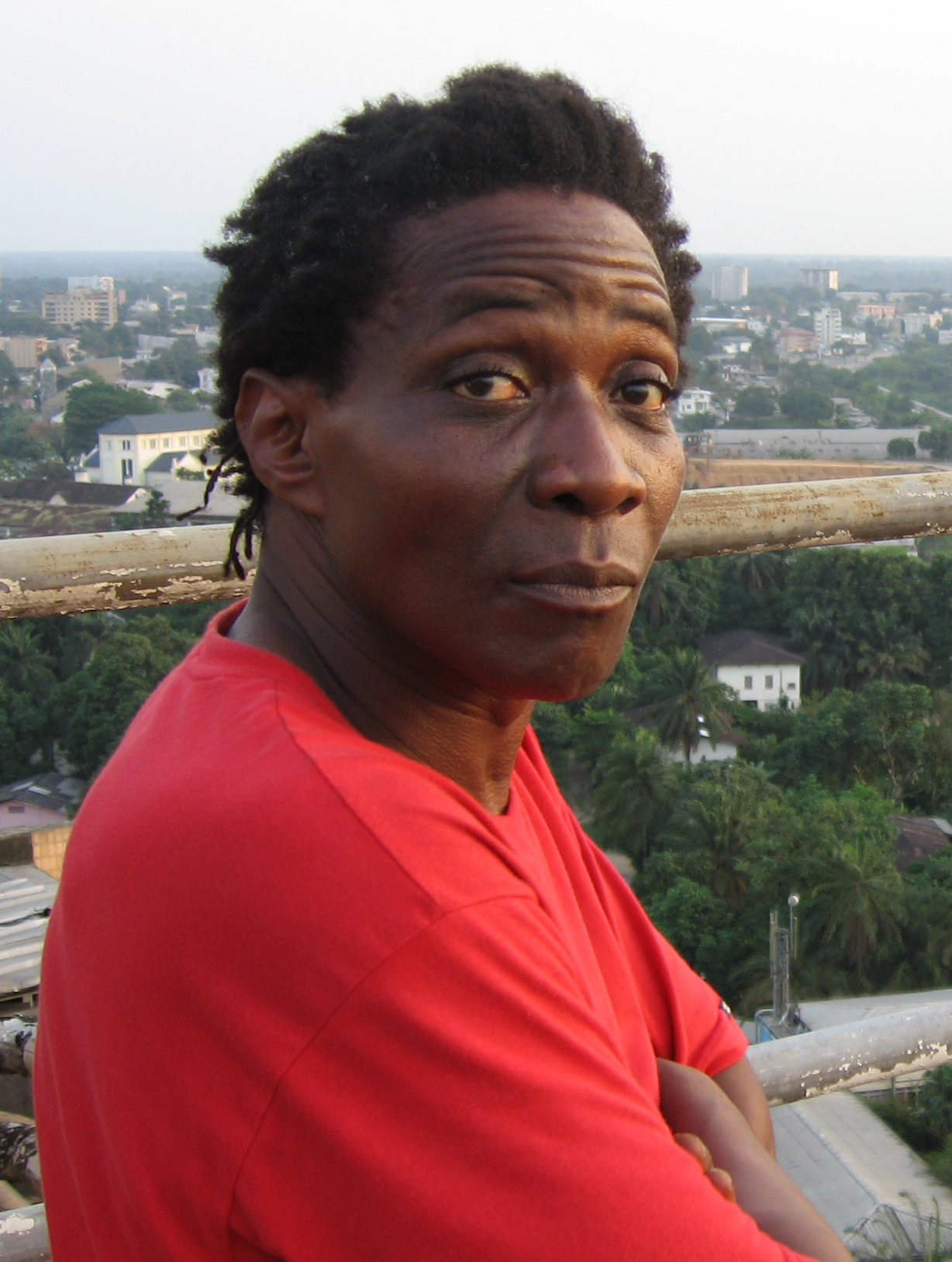
- Manga in 2007
- Born: 1 June 1955; Dschang, French Cameroons
- Died: 15 December 2024 (aged 69); Douala, Cameroon
- Occupations: Writer; cultural critic

Lionel Manga (1 June 1955 – 15 December 2024) was a Cameroonian writer and cultural critic. His 2008 book, L'Ivresse du Papillon, discusses Cameroonian visual artists such as Goddy Leye, Guy Wouété and Joseph-Francis Sumégné among others.

== Life and career ==
Manga was born on 1 June 1955. After studies in Cameroon and France, in December 2007 he collaborated with the French artist Philippe Mouillon and realized the work Bend Skins, a collection of life stories of 500 motorbike-taxi-drivers on the occasion of SUD Salon Urbain de Douala in December 2007. In 2015 he curated Presences an exhibition which focused on painting, sculpture and photography by Cameroonian artists at SCB in Douala and was featured in FACE-À-FACES, an exhibition profiling personalities from the cultural world in the salon prestige at Abidjan International Airport.

From 2005, he published in various francophone journals: Afrique et Méditerrannée, Local Contemporain, Riveneuve Continents, Politique Africaine, Douala in translation. Passionate about a transversality that he uncoils in his articles and columns for the newspapers Mutations (2001–2003), Le Messager (2006–2008), this free radical, known for his frankness and casual mischievousness, has collaborated with doual’art regarding the question of urbanity in Cameroon, for the Ars&Urbis discussion series. He was invited to speak at the Ex-tensions, créations africaines et postcolonialismes conference in Rennes in 2009. His first book is L’Ivresse du papillon.

Regard sur le Cameroun contemporain. Ombres et lucioles dans le sillage des plasticiens was published in 2008 by the publishing house Edimontagne/Artistafrica.

== Death ==
Manga died in a road collision in Douala, on 15 December 2024, at the age of 69.

== Bibliography ==
- L'Ivresse du Papillon, Broché, 2008.
- Pensa, Iolanda (Ed.) 2017. Public Art in Africa. Art et transformations urbaines à Douala /// Art and Urban Transformations in Douala. Genève: Metis Presses. ISBN 978-2-94-0563-16-6
- La sphère de Planck, Rot-Bo-Krik. 2022.

=== Essays and articles ===
- “Douala, entre mangrove et macadam”, Politique Africaine 2005/4 (N° 100), p. 65-68.
- “Whycome Kamerun be Bass Central?”, Chimurenga 16: The Chimurenga Chronic, October 2011.
- “Midway Between Silence and Speech”, The Chimurenga Chronic, August 2013.
- “Wish You Were Here”, I'm Not Your Weekend Special:Portraits on the Life, Style & Politics of Brenda Fassie, 2014.
- "Catch le mango!", In Babina and Douala Bell (Eds), Douala in Translation. A view of the city and its creative transformative potentials, 2007, pp. 28–37.
- "Aesthetic escapades", In Babina and Douala Bell (Eds), Douala in Translation. A view of the city and its creative transformative potentials, 2007, pp. 103–109.

== See also ==
- List of public art in Douala
