= Malam =

Malam is a name. Notable people with this name include:

== Surname ==
- Albert Malam (1913–1992), English football player
- Brady Malam (born 1973), New Zealand rugby league football player
- Daouda Malam Wanké (1946–2004), military and political leader in Niger
- Gaston Malam (born 1952), Cameroonian sprinter
- Halidou Malam (born 1976), Cameroonian football player
- John Malam, British historian
- Ram Singh Malam, Indian navigator, architect and craftsman

== Given name ==
- Malam Bacai Sanhá (1947–2012), Guinea-Bissau politician
- Malam Saguirou, Niger filmmaker
- Malam Wakili (born 1958), Nigerian politician
- Peter Malam Brothers (1917–2008), Royal Air Force fighter pilot and flying ace

== Other ==
- Diospyros malam or Diospyros areolata
