= Kamiel Verschuren =

Dutch conceptual artist

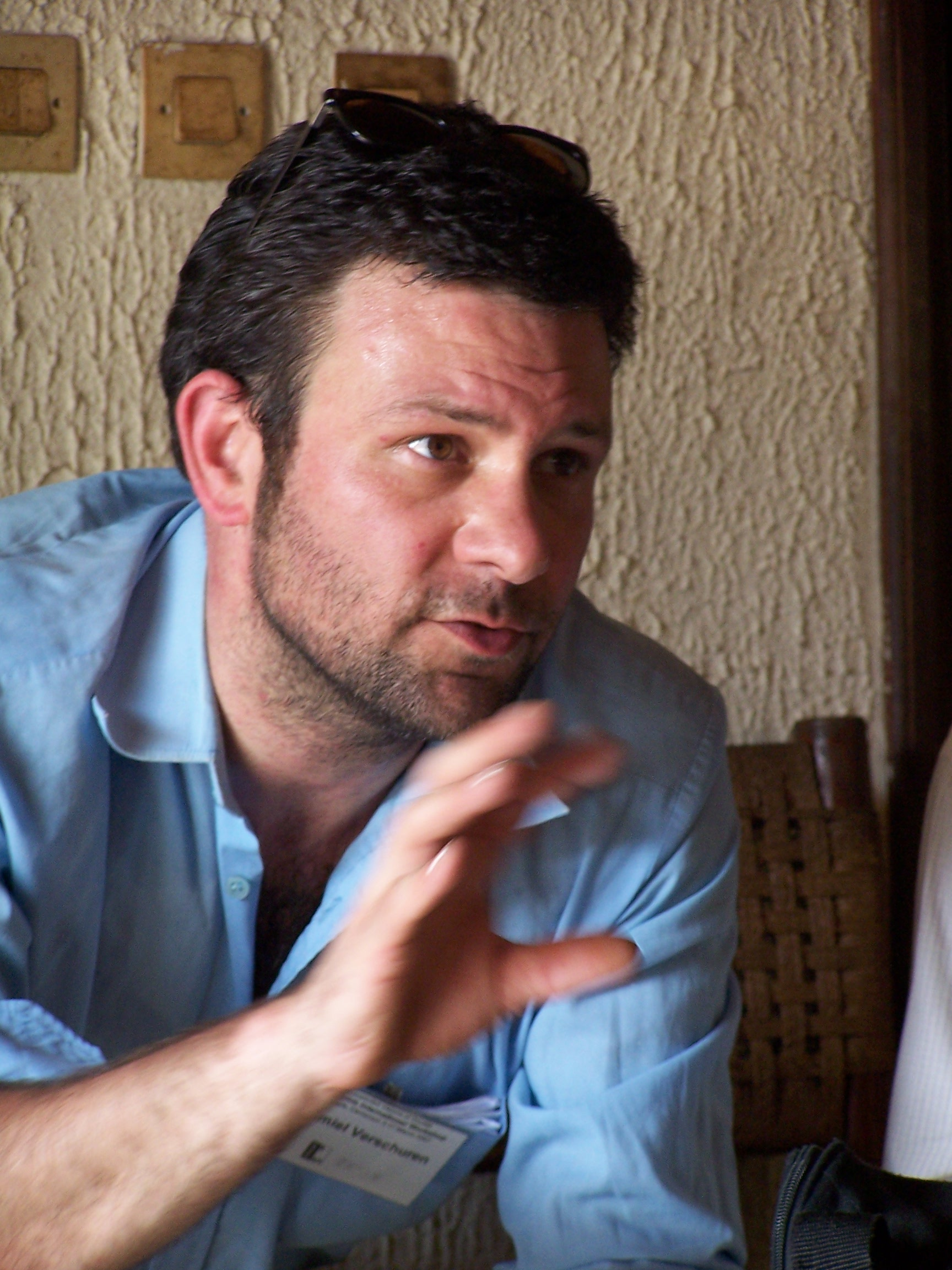
- Kamiel Verschuren
- Born: 27 September 1968 (age 57); Dordrecht
- Education: Willem de Kooning Academy
- Website: http://phk18.nl/kamiel-verschuren/

Kamiel Verschuren (born 27 September 1968 in Dordrecht) is a Dutch conceptual interdisciplinary visual artist, living and working in Rotterdam.

== Biography ==
Verschuren was born in Dordrecht as son of Kees Verschuren, an artist from The Hague and art teacher at a local school. The next year the family moved back to The Haque where he grew up and attended the Haags Montessori Lyceum.

From 1987 to 1992 Verschuren attended the Willem de Kooning Academy in Rotterdam. In those days, in 1989, he was one of the founders of the Stichting B.A.D. art collective in southern Rotterdam in Charlois with Karin Arink and others.

In the early 1990s, Verschuren came into prominence with exhibitions in Zoetermeer in 1994, and in Rotterdam in gallery Phoebus in 1995. In 1996 he took part in the artist initiative NEsTWORK with Karin Arink, Jeanne van Heeswijk, Ruud Welten and others, who participated in the first Manifesta exhibition in Rotterdam. In 2000 he held a solo exhibition in the RAM Foundation in Rotterdam.

To mainly work outside the context of the art world, museum and galleries, the activities of Verschuren resulted in collaborations with other artists, organizations and the establishment of several foundations and artist initiatives. He is active in several long-term collaborations with a.o. FSKE-Studio Galleria, S-Air (Sapporo Artists in Residence), artists’ initiative La Source du Lion in Morocco, East Street Arts in Leeds (GB), and doual’art in Cameroon.

== Work ==
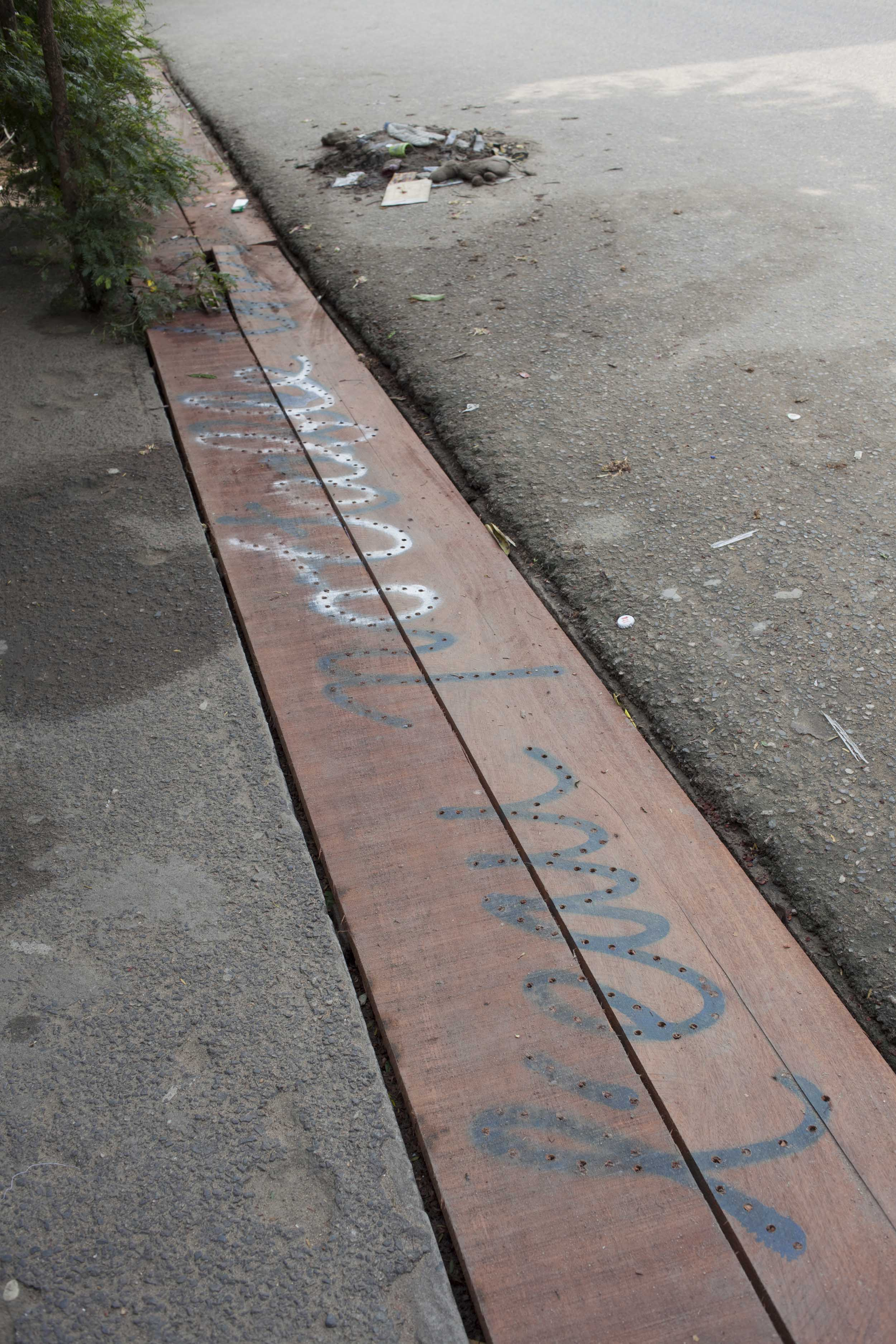
New Walks, New Ways. 2 kilometers, open-air gutters of the neighborhood New-Bell (Douala). This covering of gutter was realized with long wooden boards on which the artist wrote texts and words bound to water, which were drilled, so allowing the water to infiltrate while avoiding in the solid garbage to penetrate there.

Kamiel Verschuren is working in a broad international practice with a special interest for the public domain and the artist's position in society from different positions; as a drawer, (spatial) designer, designer of public space, organizer, initiator, social activist, observer, teacher, urban advisor, landscape artist, producer and publicist; working individually and within divers partnerships with other artists and organizations.

For Verschuren art is an open critical platform to engage with others, a global conversation, happening simultaneously at different places in which one can take part and sometimes join or even become the subject.

=== Leitmotiv in early and later work ===
Until 1998, Verschuren studied and worked on understanding and expending the concept of space and the idea of existentialism, often resulting in literary works (sound-text-video): installations, conceptual art, drawings, photo works and writings. He skilled himself to work in all media and techniques, except painting, as he believes there is no better or worse context for art.

In 1998, he decided to shift directions and started to work within realism and participation; within the context of daily life, in which art has to create its own context to be meaningful and in which artists have to re-find their role as part of society. Verschuren: "True meaning can only be found in the encounter with others through working together and by participating".

=== Larger public commissions, public art projects and manifestations ===
In 1996–2005, he completed several larger public commissions often re-setting the original assignment to realize art as public space and creating examples for policy makers to extend their practice and policies. Since 1998, he is closely involved with the urban and social development of Rotterdam South, where he works and lives.

Starting in 2000, he initialized and realized over 60 public art projects and manifestations, such as:

- Several public commissions ranging from The Shadow of the Image (1996), the MaastunnelMonument NL (2003) and the Penitentiary in Breda (2004–06) to more recently De Schouwplaats (2014).
- First four editions of the Open Studios Charlois (2001–2004)
- International art manifestations Something over Charlois (2001–2003)
- Sound installation for Poetry International (2006)
- MoreLakeCity-X (2006)
- Moving in Free Zones (2007)
- Overview exhibitions OnSouth#1 and OnSouth#2 (2010)
- Sculpture garden De Schouwplaats

In the late 2010s, with foundation Stedelinks010, Verschuren has been investing in the social and physical infrastructure of Rotterdam South, organizing an independent ferry boat to connect the south to the north of the city and a neighborhood pop-up restaurant (foundation Charlois aan het Water). The aim of these projects and initiatives is to create public life in the south area of Rotterdam, to connect and empower people, question authority and to create freedom by taking on responsibility.
