= Diospyros areolata =

Conservation status
- Least Concern (IUCN 3.1)

Scientific classification
- Kingdom: Plantae
- Clade: Tracheophytes
- Clade: Angiosperms
- Clade: Eudicots
- Clade: Asterids
- Order: Ericales
- Family: Ebenaceae
- Genus: Diospyros
- Species: D. areolata

Binomial name
- Diospyros areolata King & Gamble

Synonyms
- Diospyros bantamensis Koord. & Valeton ex Bakh.; Diospyros malam Bakh.; Diospyros pseudomalabarica Bakh.

Species of flowering plant

Diospyros areolata is a tree in the family Ebenaceae. The specific epithet areolata means 'net-like', referring to the leaf veins.

== Description ==
Diospyros areolata grows up to 30 metres (100 ft) tall. The twigs are reddish brown when young. Inflorescences usually bear three flowers. The fruits are round, up to 4 cm (1.6 in) in diameter.

== Distribution and habitat ==
Diospyros areolata is native to Vietnam, Sumatra, Peninsular Malaysia and Borneo. Its habitat is lowland mixed dipterocarp and swamp forests to elevations of 940 m (3,080 ft).

== Conservation ==
Diospyros areolata has been assessed as least concern on the IUCN Red List, due to its broad distribution. However it is threatened by a number of factors including logging for its timber; palm oil and rubber plantations; mining and urban development. The species' presence in a number of protected areas, including Malaysia's Pasoh Forest Reserve, affords it a level of protection.
