= Tracey Rose =

South African artist (born 1974)

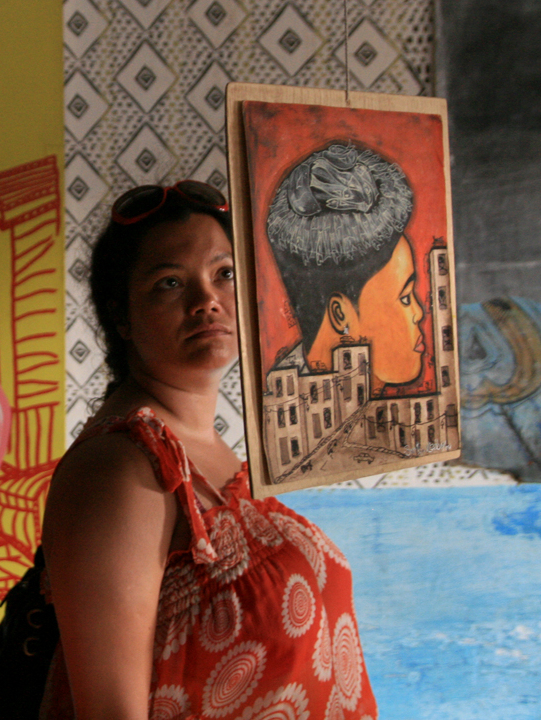
- In December 2010, at salon urbain de Douala, looking at an artwork of Boris Nzebo.
- Born: 1974 (age 51–52); Durban, South Africa
- Education: University of the Witwatersrand
- Known for: installation art, video art, performance

Tracey Rose (born 1974) is a South African artist who lives and works in Johannesburg, South Africa. Rose is best known for her performances, video installations, and photographs.

== Biography ==
Tracey Rose was born in 1974 in Durban, South Africa. She attended the University of the Witwatersrand in Johannesburg, where she obtained her B.A. degree in Fine Arts in 1996. She taught at Vaal Triangle Technikon, Vanderbijl Park, South Africa, and at the University of the Witwatersrand. In February and March 2001, she was artist-in-residence in Cape Town at the South African National Gallery, where she developed her work for the Venice Biennale 2001 curated by Harald Szeemann.

Rose is represented in the US by Christian Haye of The Project. In 2006 The Independent named Tracey Rose was named as one of the 50 best artists of Africa . Baaba Maal,Owusu Ankomah; Ian Birrell, Margaret Busby, Augustus Casely-Hayford, Thelma Holt ,Frances Harding, Gregory Maqoma and Keith Shiri comprised the panel.

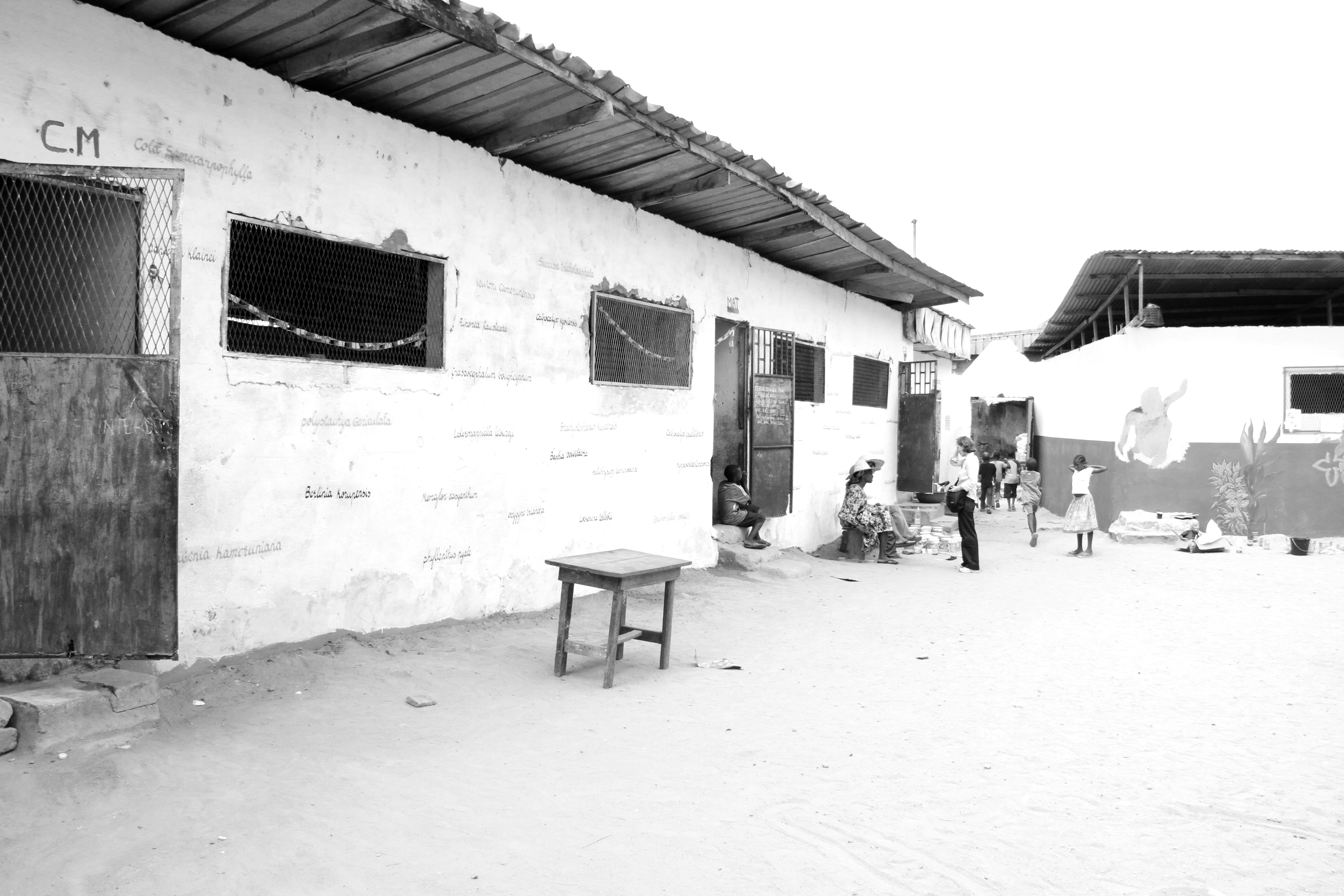
Tracey Rose, SUD-Salon Urbain de Douala 2010. Photo Roberto Paci Dalò

Rose's work responds to the limitations of dogma and the flaws in institutionalized cultural discourse. Her practice, which is known for centering on performance, also includes photography, video, and installation. Always evident in her work is the artist's insistence in confronting the politics of identity, including sexual, racial, and gender-based themes. According to Jan Avgikos, "part of Rose's appeal is her fluid referencing of '60s and '70s performance art".

- The Thinker, found object and text, 1996. reproduction of the sculpture The Thinker by Auguste Rodin.
- Span I and Span II, 1997. The work was presented at the second Johannesburg Biennale in the show Graft curated by Colin Richards, 1997. The work was also presented at the Dakar Biennale in 2000.,
- Ongetiteld (Untitled). A video made with surveillance cameras in which she shaves off all of her body hair. The work was presented in Democracy's Images, Bildmuseet in Umeå in Sweden, 1998.
- TKO, 2000.
- Ciao Bella, 2001. The work was produced for the Venice Biennale 2001.
- Lolita, 2001, lambda photograph, 120 x 120 cm.
- The Kiss, 2001, lambda photograph.
- Venus Baartman, 2001, lambda photograph, 120 x 120 cm.
- Half A, 2003, digital print, 55 x 37.5 cm.
- Lucie's Fur Version 1:1:1 – La Messie, 2003, lambda photograph, 148 x 102 cm.
- The Prelude The Gardenpath, 2006, DVD.

== Exhibitions ==
According to Sue Williamson, "Tracey Rose is not a practitioner who jumps at every curatorial opportunity offered her, and has been known to withdraw from more than one exhibition if the circumstances have not seemed right." Rose's work has been widely exhibited in Africa, Europe and the United States. Recent solo exhibitions include The Cockpit at MC, Los Angeles, California, Plantation Lullabies at the Goodman Gallery, Johannesburg, South Africa, both in 2008.

Recent group exhibitions include El mirall sud-africà at the Centre De Cultura Contemporània De Barcelona, Spain, Mouth Open, Teeth Showing: Major Works from the True Collection at the Henry Art Gallery in Seattle, Memories of Modernity in Malmo, Sweden, Check List: Luanda Pop at the African Pavilion in the 52nd Venice Biennale, Italy, Heterotopias at the Thessaloniki Biennale in Greece, and Global Feminisms at The Elizabeth A. Sackler Center for Feminist Art in Brooklyn, New York (all in 2007), and the 11th Lyon Biennale A terrible beauty is born in 2011.

Caryatid & BinneKant Die Wit Does and Imperfect Performance: A tale in Two States are among her most recent live performances, seen at the Düsseldorf Art Fair in Germany, and the Moderna Museet in Stockholm, Sweden, respectively. In 2001. Rose was also included in Plateau de l'humanite in the 49th Venice Biennale curated by Harald Szeemann.

=== Solo exhibitions ===
- The Project, New York, 1999
- The Goodman Gallery, Johannesburg, 2000
- The Project, New York, 2000
- Ciao Bella, The Goodman Gallery, Johannesburg, 2002
- The Project, New York, 2002
- The Project, New York City, 2004
- The Thieveing Fuck and the Intagalactic Lay, The Goodman Gallery, Johannesburg, 2004
- The Project, New York City, NY, 2007
- Plantation Lullabies, The Goodman Gallery, Johannesburg, 2008
- The Cockpit, MC Kunst, Los Angeles, 2008
- Raison d'être, Espace doual'art, Douala, 2009
- Shooting down Babylon, ZEITZ MOCAA, 2021

=== Group exhibitions ===
- Scramble, Civic Theatre Gallery, Johannesburg, South Africa, 1996
- Hitch-hiker, Generator Art Space, Johannesburg, South Africa, 1996
- Graft-Trade Routes History and Geography, (catalogue) 2nd Johannesburg Biennale, South African National Gallery, Cape Town, South Africa, 1997
- 50 Stories (co-curator), "Top of Africa" Carlton Centre, Johannesburg, South Africa, 1997
- Cross/ings, (catalogue) Museum of Contemporary Art, Tampa, USA, 1997
- FNB Vita Awards, (catalogue) Sandton Art Gallery, Johannesburg, 1997
- Purity and Danger, Gertrude Posel Gallery, Johannesburg, South Africa, 1997
- 7th Triennale der Klienplastik, (catalogue) Europe Africa, SudwestLB Forum, Stuttgart, Germany, 1998
- Guagrene Arte 98, Fondazione Sandretto Re Rebaudengo per l'arte, Turino, Italy, 1998
- Democracy's Images, (catalogue) Photography and Visual Art After Apartheid, Bildmuseet, Umea, Sweden, 1998
- Dark Continent, Klein Karoo Nasionale Kunstefees, Oudtshoorn, South Africa, 1998
- Art of the World 1998, (catalogue) Passage de Retz, Paris, France, 1998
- Video Cult/ures ZKM, Museum fur Neue Kunst, Karlsruhe, Germany, 1999
- Channel, South African National Gallery, Cape Town, South Africa, 1999
- Dialog: Vice Verses, (catalogue) Europe Africa, SudwestLB Forum, Stuttgart, Germany, 1999
- 2000 ArtPace, San Antonio (residency)
- documenta 14 exhibition, Athens, Greece and Kassel, Germany, 2017
- Performa 07 biennial, New York, United States, 2017
- “May You Live In Interesting Times”, 58th Venice Biennale, Italy, 2019.

== Interviews and press ==
- Nkgopoleng Moloi. 2018. Through the language of performance Tracey Rose creates art that refuses to settle. Bubblegum Club.
- Zaza Hlalethwa. 2019. "More than one layer to the art and life of Tracey Rose". Mail & Guardian.
- Carli Collison. 2022. "The calling of Tracey Rose". Mail & Guardian.
- Sindi-Leigh McBride. 2022. "The courage and catharsis of Tracey Rose". News24.

== Scholarly influence ==
- Boulle, C., & Pather, J. 2019. Acts of Transgression. WITS Press: Johannesburg

== Bibliography ==
- Sue Williamson, "A feature on an artist in the public eye: Tracey Rose" in Artthrob, no. 43, March 2001.
- Tracey Rose: Fresh, edited by Kellie Jones and Emma Bedford, South African National Gallery, 2003.
- Emma Bedford, "Tracey Rose" in 10 years 100 artists: art in a democratic South Africa, ed. Sophie Perryer, Struik, 2004.
- Tracey Murinik, "Tracey Rose: plasticienne", Les Carnets de la création, Paris: Afrique du sud, Éditions de l'Oeil, 2005.
- Pensa, Iolanda (ed.), 2017. Public Art in Africa. Art et transformations urbaines à Douala /// Art and Urban Transformations in Douala. Genève: Metis Presses. ISBN 978-2-94-0563-16-6
