= International Africa Development Forum =

International Africa Development Forum or (Forum International Afrique développement, FIAD) is an annual event launched by Attijariwafa Bank, under the patronage of King Mohammed VI. The Fiad was put in place in 2010 by businessmen Mounir Majidi to raise a deep reflection around the development of the African continent.

Held in Casablanca, Morocco, this forum aims at encouraging the interactions between African countries to create investment opportunities in different fields such as agriculture, electrification, access to housing, infrastructure and urbanisation. Since its inception, the event gathered more than 5 500 economical and institutional operators from 36 countries among which 24 are Africans.

== History ==
=== First edition ===
The first forum was held on April 19–20, 2010 under the theme “What are the opportunities of development and investment in Africa in a context of crisis resolution ?” The first edition of the International Development Forum was chaired by the Moroccan Minister of Foreign Affairs Taieb Fassi Fihri and Attijariwafa bank’s CEO Mohamed El-Kettani. The event gathered more than 500 economic operators from Morocco, West and central Africa.

=== The 2012 edition ===
Held on November 7–8, 2012, the second edition of the International Africa Development Forum welcomed more than 1300 of policy makers and economic actors from 12 African countries. The 2012 edition focused on the following themes : transportation in the context of the lack of quality road infrastructures and the ailing rail infrastructures, the protection of investment and its regulatory framework as well as the methods to finance investment and commercial transactions.

=== The 2015 edition ===
In 2015, Attijariwafa Bank partnered with Maroc Export to organize the third edition of the International Africa Development Forum in order to consolidate Morocco’s image as a driving force for African development. The 2015 meeting was carried under the theme “Time to Invest”. The Young entrepreneur Prize was awarded for the first time during this edition.

=== The 2016 edition ===
The 4th edition of the International Africa Development Forum was carried in February under the theme “Agriculture and Electrification : Mobilizing energies”, since 60% of the African population are lacking access to electricity. This edition marked the implementation of the investment market prize to honour seven counties and provide them with visibility for their national development plans as well as their Bank.

=== The 2017 edition ===
The 2017 edition of the International Africa Development Forum was held in March, in the context of Morocco’s reintegration into the African Union and its application for membership of the Economic Community of West African States (ECOWAS). The Forum was attended by more than 1 500 economical and institutional operators from 20 countries.

== Activities ==
A jury is set at every annual gathering to decide the winners of the following awards :

- Investment Market: It pays tribute to countries on the sidelines of the forum. In 2017, this award was attributed to Burkina Faso, Madagascar, Rwanda, the Republic of Congo, Tunisia, Egypt, Ivory Coast and Senegal. Each of these countries is invited to present their national development plans and the investment projects of their banks.
- South South Cooperation Trophees : destined to leading and pioneering companies in the economic integration in Africa. Several prizes are awarded, during the event, such as the 1st prize “ Platinum trophy”, the second prize “ Gold trophy” and the third prize “Silver trophy”. There is also the Jury prize and the Honor Prize. In 2017, Tunisian company Lilas was the winner of the 1st prize, the gold trophy went to Moroccan company HPS and the Silver trophy was attributed to Ivorian company, Sania. The honorary prize was awarded to Burkina Faso’s president, Roch Marc Christian Kaboré.
- Young Entrepreneur Award : Awarded since 2015, to young entrepreneurs in the categories of innovation, social entrepreneurship. The 2017 laureate is Francis Yapobi (Ivory Coast), designer of “Airshop Systèmes”, a platform for planes.
- Stand up for African Women Entrepreneurs: it will be launched in 2018 par Attijariwafa bank to support African women entrepreneurship.

== Africa Development Club ==
In 2016, Attijariwafa bank created the Africa development Club in order to set a business community in Africa that supports economic operators and communities working with banks in its network.

The club aims at connecting these communities to help them discover new markets, and respond to tenders. With 400 members from 12 African countries, the Club includes six branches spread in Abidjan, dakar, Douala, Libreville, Pointe Noire and Tunis. The first Africa Development Club’s meeting was organized in partnership with the Ivorian Ministry of Tourism and the SIB, under the theme “Investment opportunities in Tourism”. The meeting was held on April 20, 2017, in Abidjan.
