= Joseph-Francis Sumégné =

Cameroonian painter and sculptor

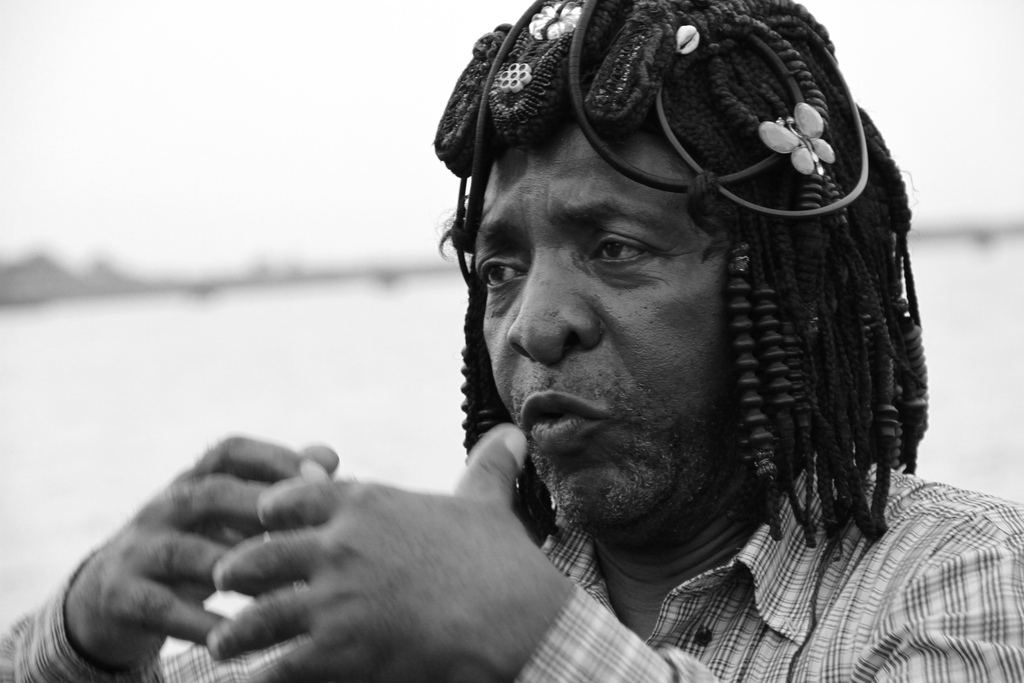
- Joseph-Francis Sumégné
- Born: 30 July 1951 (age 75); Bamendjou (Cameroon)
- Notable work: La Nouvelle Liberté
- Style: Painting, sculpture
- Patrons: doual'art

Joseph-Francis Sumégné was born on 30 July 1951 in Bamenjou, Cameroon. Painter and sculptor since 1976, he is a self-taught artist. He lives and works in Yaoundé (Cameroon).

== Biography ==
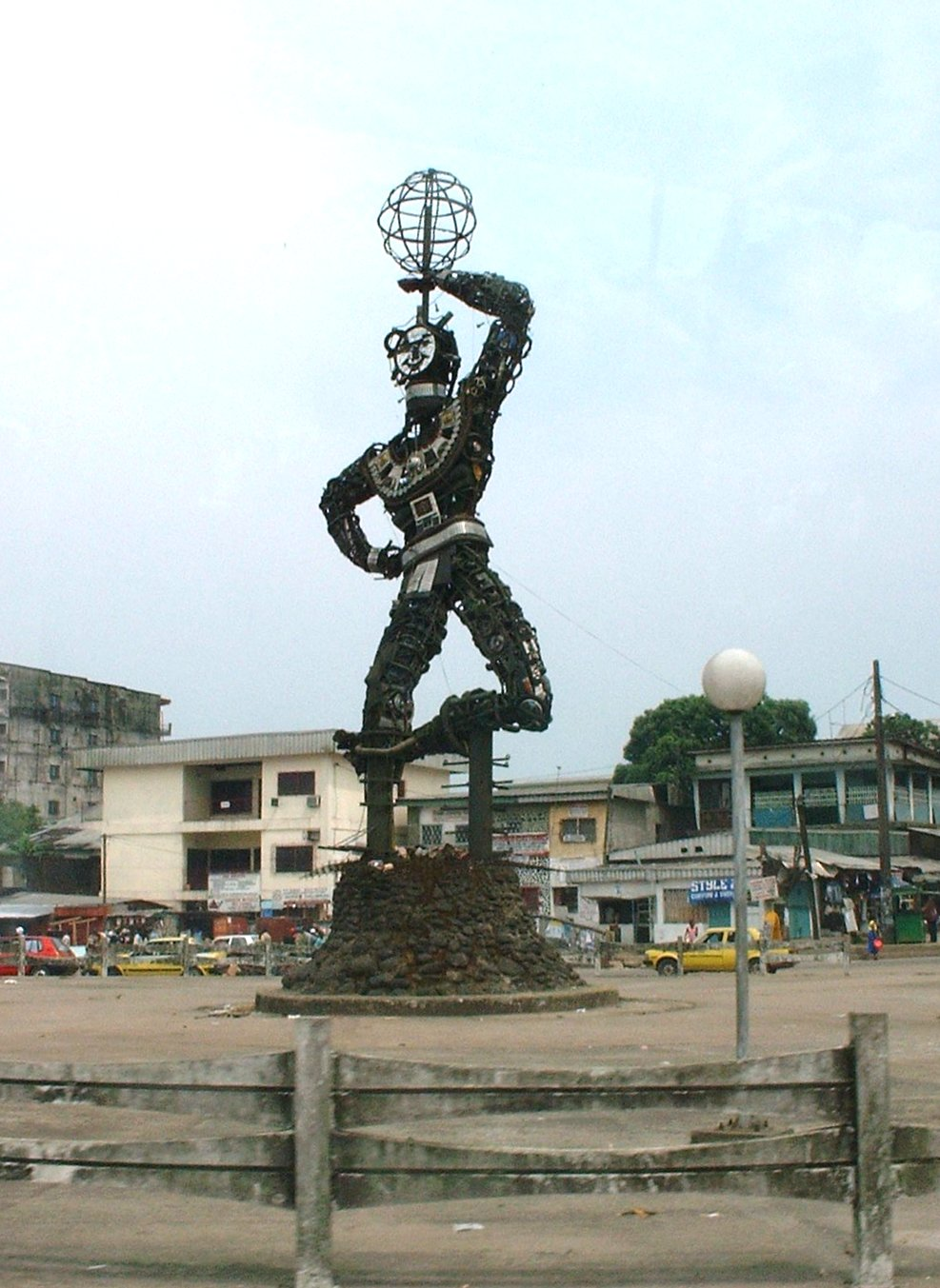
Joseph Francis Sumégné, La Nouvelle Liberté, 1996

Influenced by the engravings and the tattoos that he observed on his grandmother's body and pillars of the royal houses to the west of Cameroon, he drew a lot during his childhood in the village. He then got introduced to different types of artistic practices (sculpture, colorization, jewelry, basketry and weaving), the combination of which will characterize his future work. His works are marked by the influences of traditional sculpture in his home region. The fusion of found objects linked with copper wire and stitches that he invents, confront the challenge of the free volume. Concretizing his desires, pains, passions, indignations and dreams through his sculptures, Sumégné invents his philosophy and his technique of JALA'A to manifest and magnify self-transcendence. The topics addressed by Sumégné are multiple: masks and characters of traditional powers, men and women on the move (dancers, pushed-pushers), scenes out of his daily environment.

Invited to a do a residency in Douala by doual'art for three years, from 1993 to 1996, Sumégné made his La Nouvelle Liberté, a monumental sculpture of 12 meters in height. He has been invited to create outdoor works in Gabon, France and Germany. His latest urban creation was Le monument pour la Paix for the contemporary art biennale of Bangui, in the Central African Republic. He has exhibited in several countries, including Japan for the triennial of Osaka (1998) and the Netherlands for the triennial of Arnhem (2008). In 2004, he participated in the biennale of Dakar (Senegal), in a one-man show in the official selection, where he presented his series of sculptures Les neufs notables to an international audience for the first time. His latest big public presentation took place in 2014 at ArtFair London, in the United Kingdom. In 2015, he reunited with painting.

== Expositions ==
=== Individual ===
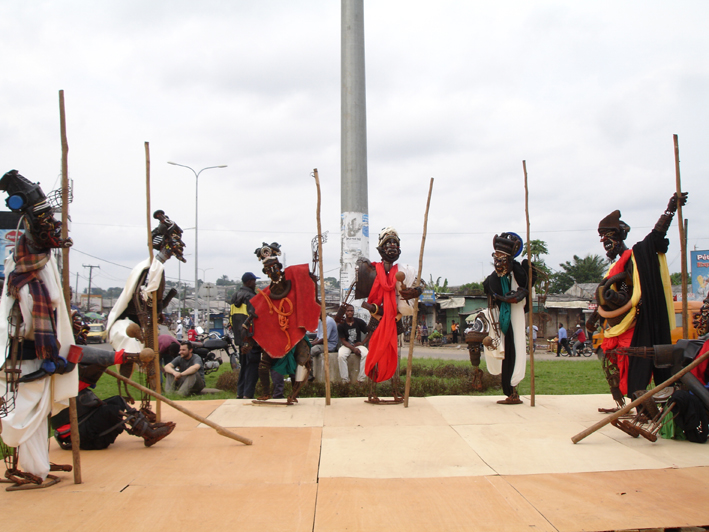
Artistic representation by Joseph-Francis Sumégné of neuf notables Bamiléké

- 2008
  - Mouvements de poussière-Espace doual'art, Douala
- 2005
  - Les neuf Notables-Espace doual'art, Douala
- 2003
  - Exposition sans titre de Joseph-Francis Sumégné-Espace doual'art, Douala
- 2002
  - Exposition de sculptures de Joseph-Francis Sumégné-Espace doual'art, Douala

=== Collective ===
- 2010
  - Cameroonian Touch.2, Espace doual'art, Douala
- 2008
  - Sonsbeek 2008: grandeur, Sonsbeek International Sculpture Exhibition, Arnhem
- 2007
  - Africa Remix -Contemporary art of a continent, Johannesburg Art Gallery (JAG), Johannesburg
- 2006
  - Africa Remix -Contemporary Art of a Continent, Mori Art Museum, Tokyo
  - Guerre contre la Pauvreté, Espace doual'art, Douala
- 2005
  - Africa Remix -l'art contemporain d'un continent, Centre Pompidou – Musée National d'Art Moderne, Paris
  - Africa Remix -Contemporary Art of a Continent, Hayward Gallery, Londres
- 2004
  - Africa Remix -Zeitgenössische Kunst eines Kontinents, Museum Kunst Palast, Düsseldorf
  - 6e Biennale de l'Art africain contemporain, Dak'Art Biennale de Dakar, Dakar
- 1998
  - Dak'Art 1998, Biennale de l'Art africain contemporain, Dak'Art Biennale de Dakar, Dakar

== Bibliography ==
- Marie-Laure Bernadac et Simon Njami (dir.), Africa Remix : l'art contemporain d'un continent (exposition présentée au Centre Pompidou, Galerie 1, du 25 mai au 8 août 2005), Éditions du Centre Pompidou, Paris, 2005, p. 158-159; 326 ISBN 2-84426-280-5
- Dominique Malaquais, Une nouvelle liberté ? Art et politique urbaine à Douala (Cameroun) in Afrique & histoire, Dossier : Villes d'Afrique : circulations et expressions culturelles, 2006/1 (vol. 5), p. 111-134.
- Joseph Francis Sumégné in Africultures.
- Dominique Malaquais, Quelle Liberté : Art, Beauty and the Grammars of Resistance in Douala in Beautiful/Ugly : African and diaspora aesthetics, (dir.) Sarah Nuttall, Duke University Press Library & Prince Claus Fund, Durham & The Hague, 2006, p. 122-163. ISBN 0795701861, 9780795701863
- Christian Hanussek, La Nouvelle Liberté-Le Nju-Nju du Rond-Point in Douala in Translation, (dir.) Marilyn Douala Bell, Episode Publishers, Rotterdam, 2007, p. 209-223.
- Batchou, W. F. (2014): Cameroun- Art plastiques: L’escale sculpturale de Joseph Francis Sumegne. Cemerpost.
- Christel, A. (2015). Impressionnisme et expressionnisme sculptural dans l'oeuvre de Joseph Francis Sumegne. Artkmermouth.
- Hanussek, C. (2001). Cameroon: An Emerging Art Scene. Nka: Journal of Contemporary African Art, 2001(13–14), pp. 100–105.
- Lequeux, E. (2012). A Douala, la princesse qui veut éveiller les consciences. Culture.
- Linge, I. (2010). Joseph Francis Sumegne ou l'art de la nouvelle liberté. Journal du Cameron
- N'Goné, F., Loup, P. J. (2001). Anthologie de l'art africain du XXe siècle. Paris: Revue Noire Editions, Paris, pp. 268
- Nehdi, D. (2012): Sumegne Joseph Francis : c’est la quête du chef-d’œuvre qui détermine un artiste. Culturebene.
- Noubissi, V. (2016): La Nouvelle liberté séduit Douala. Agricdev.
- Osaka Triennale 1998. (1998). 1st ed. Osaka: Osaka Prefectural Government: Osaka Foundation of Culture, p. 62.
- Raphael, D. Hommage à Joseph Francis Sumegne: Fils de Bamendjou et créateur de la statue de la nouvelle liberté à Douala-Cameroun.
- Pensa, Iolanda (Ed.) 2017. Public Art in Africa. Art et transformations urbaines à Douala /// Art and Urban Transformations in Douala. Genève: Metis Presses. ISBN 978-2-94-0563-16-6

=== See also ===
- List of public art in Douala
- Contemporary African art
- African art
