= Joël Mpah Dooh =

Cameroonian artist

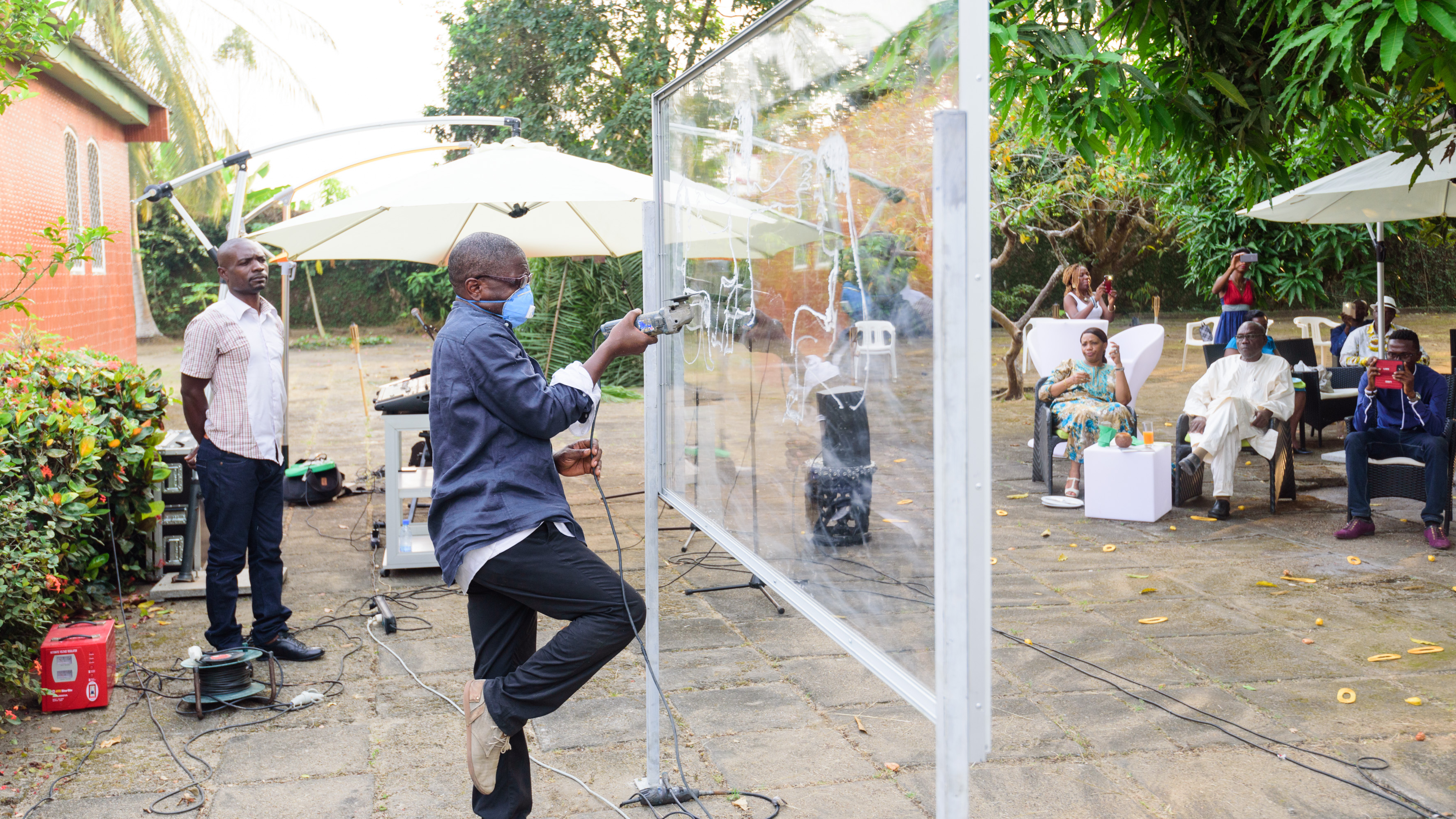
- Joël Mpah Dooh
- Born: 1956; Cameroon
- Style: sculpture
- Patron(s): doual’art, Fondation Blachère

Joël Claude Mpah Dooh, born in Nkongsamba (Cameroon) in 1956, is a visual artist who lives and works in Douala.

== Biography ==
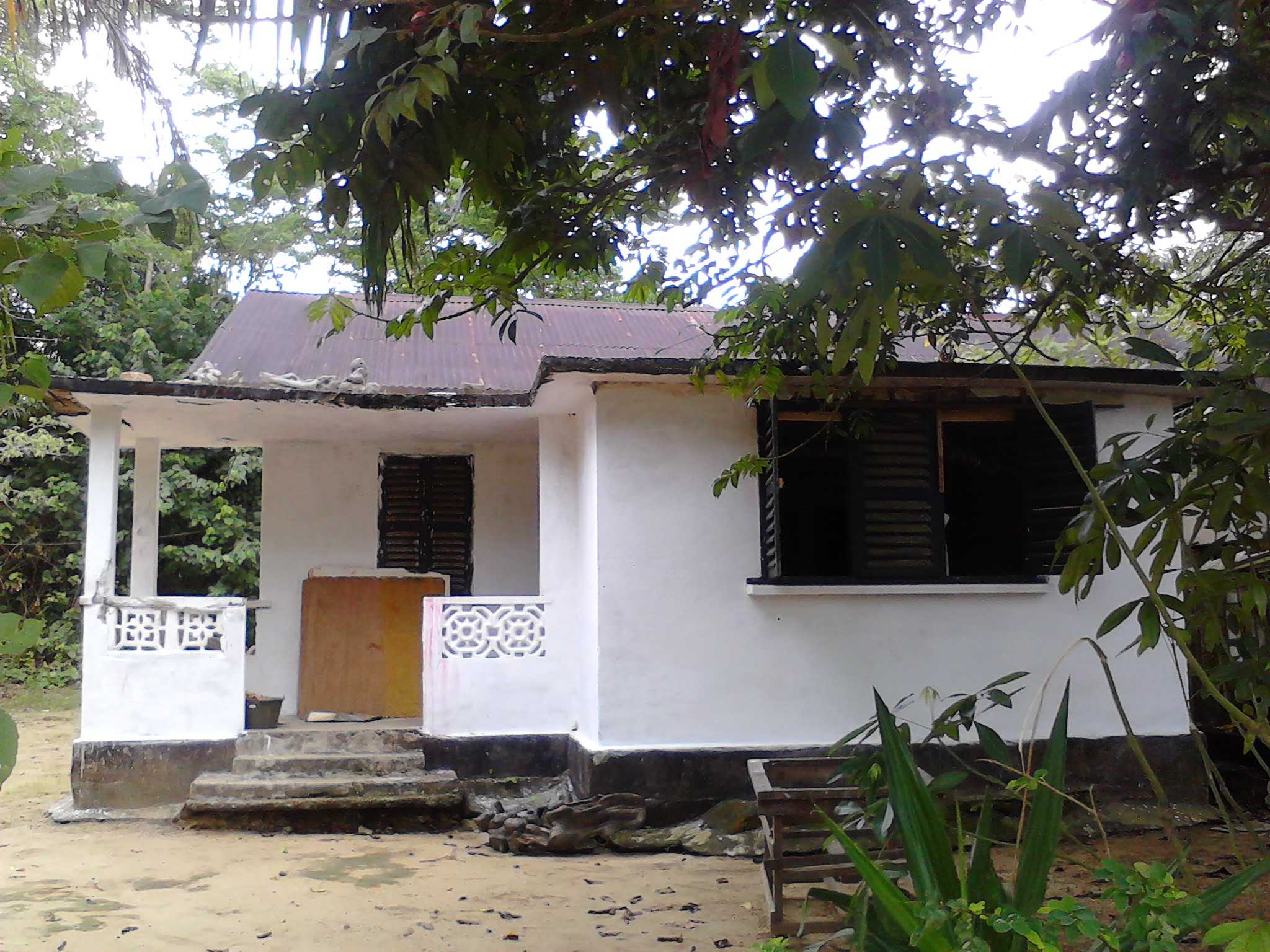
Atelier de l'artiste (2013).

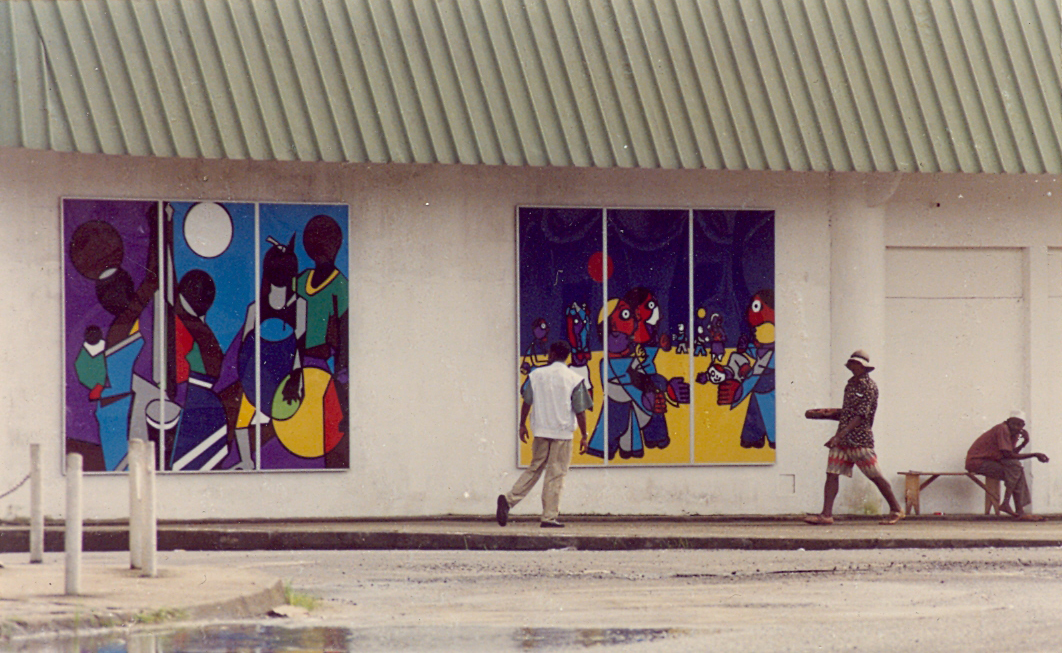
Les triptyques Artventure de Etienne Delacroix et Joël Mpah Dooh réalisés en 1992. Ces panneaux triptyques de plexiglas sont les premières œuvres d’art public offertes par l’association doual’art à la ville en 1993 produits avec les soutiens du Centre culturel français de Douala et de Graphics System. Ils sont le résultat d’un atelier de création plastique assistée par ordinateur.

Joël Claude Mpah Dooh is a graduate of the Conservatoire Municipal des Beaux-Arts of Amiens (France).

His first works on canvas offer filiform characters in postures expressing pain and seeking deliverance. His later works became very urban writings, similar to graffiti. His experiments led him to work in three dimensions, volume representing the characters of his first paintings, interpreting the poverty of amorphous people left to themselves. He works with other materials such as aluminum foil, which he paints and scratches, or Plexiglas sheets, also scratched up, which with light creates games of shadows.

In terms of public art, he is the author of one of the four works outside of the series Art’venture, offered by doual’art to the city of Douala in 1992. During this workshop with computer-aided graphic design, he met the “dean” of Cameroonian artists Koko Komégné, whom he befriended and cofounded the collective Kheops Club in 1994. Joel Mpah Dooh was also one of the artists invited to Scénographies Urbaines de Douala in 2002. He has participated in several collective and individual exhibitions, which brought him to Nigeria, South Africa, Senegal, the United States, Cuba, Lebanon and France. In 2007, he was invited by the Fondation Blachère à Apt (France) to inaugurate the residency series Art et entreprise.

== Expositions ==
2008

- After taste, solo exhibition, Afronova Gallery, Johannesburg (Sudafrica)
- Joburg scene, thee-man show, Bag Factory, Johannesburg
- As you like it, group show, Johannesburg Art Fair, Sandton Convention Center, Johannesburg

2007

- Eclipse, solo exhibition, Maisons Follies, Maubeuge (Francia)
- Eclipse, solo exhibition, Fondation Jean Paul Blachère, Apt (Francia)
- Ba Mama, two man show with Goddy Leye, Bonendale, Douala
- Pistes africaines, solo exhibition, Les Chantiers de la Lune, La Seyne sur Mer (Francia)

2006

- Just to say hello..., solo exhibition, Afronova Gallery, Johannesburg
- Rendez-vous, solo exhibition, Mam Gallery, Douala
- Reves croisees, group show, Ateliers des Tanneurs, Brussels (Belgio)

2005

- Sans Titre, solo exhibition, Théâtre de la ville en bois, La Rochelle (Francia)
- Les galeries plastiques itinérantes, Ouagadougou, Bamako, Lome, Niamey, Accra, Dakar
- Group show, Intemporel Gallery, Parigi
- National Black Fine Art Show, solo exhibition, Noël Gallery, New York

2004

- Sans Titre, solo exhibition, Noël Gallery, Charlotte (U.S.A.)
- Moi est un autre, solo exhibition, Mam Gallery, Douala
- Group show, McColl Center for Visual Art, Charlotte
- Group show, Dakar Biennale, Atiss Gallery, Dakar
- Animismes, group show, Da Vinci Gallery, Nice

2003

- Sans Titre, solo exhibition, Maison Française de Nairobi
- Recto-Verso, solo exhibition, Mam Gallery, Douala
- Scénographie Urbaine, group show, Mam Gallery, Douala

2002

- Djé Mo-Yé, solo exhibition, Mam Gallery, Douala, Group show, Dakar Biennale, Atiss Gallery, Dakar

2001

- Voyage a travers le rêve et la mémoire, solo exhibition, National Museum, Yaoundé
- Lines of Connection, group show, Mam Gallery, Douala

2000

- Group show, 7th Havana Biennale, Havana
- L'Afrique a Jour, Ten years of Dakar Biennale, group show, Lille (Francia)

1999

- Sans Titre, solo exhibition, Mam Gallery, Douala

1998

- Couleurs du Cameroun, solo exhibition, Le Nautilus, Nantes
- Nanga Def, solo exhibition, Musée d'Art Africain de l'IFAN, Dakar

1997

- Les couleurs de la différence, two-man show, Mam Gallery, Douala

== Bibliography ==
- Gallery Momo. Joël Mpah Dooh.
- Africa 24. LE MAG - Joël MPAH DOOH – Cameroun.
- Manga, L. (2008). L'ivresse du papillon. 1st ed. Servoz: Edimontagne, pp. 86–99.
- Pensa, Iolanda (Ed.) 2017. Public Art in Africa. Art et transformations urbaines à Douala /// Art and Urban Transformations in Douala. Genève: Metis Presses. ISBN 978-2-94-0563-16-6

== See also ==
- List of public art in Douala
- Contemporary African art
- African art
