= Culture of Cameroon =

Cameroon has a rich and diverse culture made up of a mix of about 250 indigenous populations and just as many languages and customs. The country is nicknamed "Little Africa" as geographically, Cameroon consists of coastline, mountains, grass plains, forest, rainforest and desert, all of the geographical regions in Africa in one country. This also contributes to its cultural diversity as ways of life and traditional food dishes and traditions vary from geographical region to geographical region.

== Holidays ==
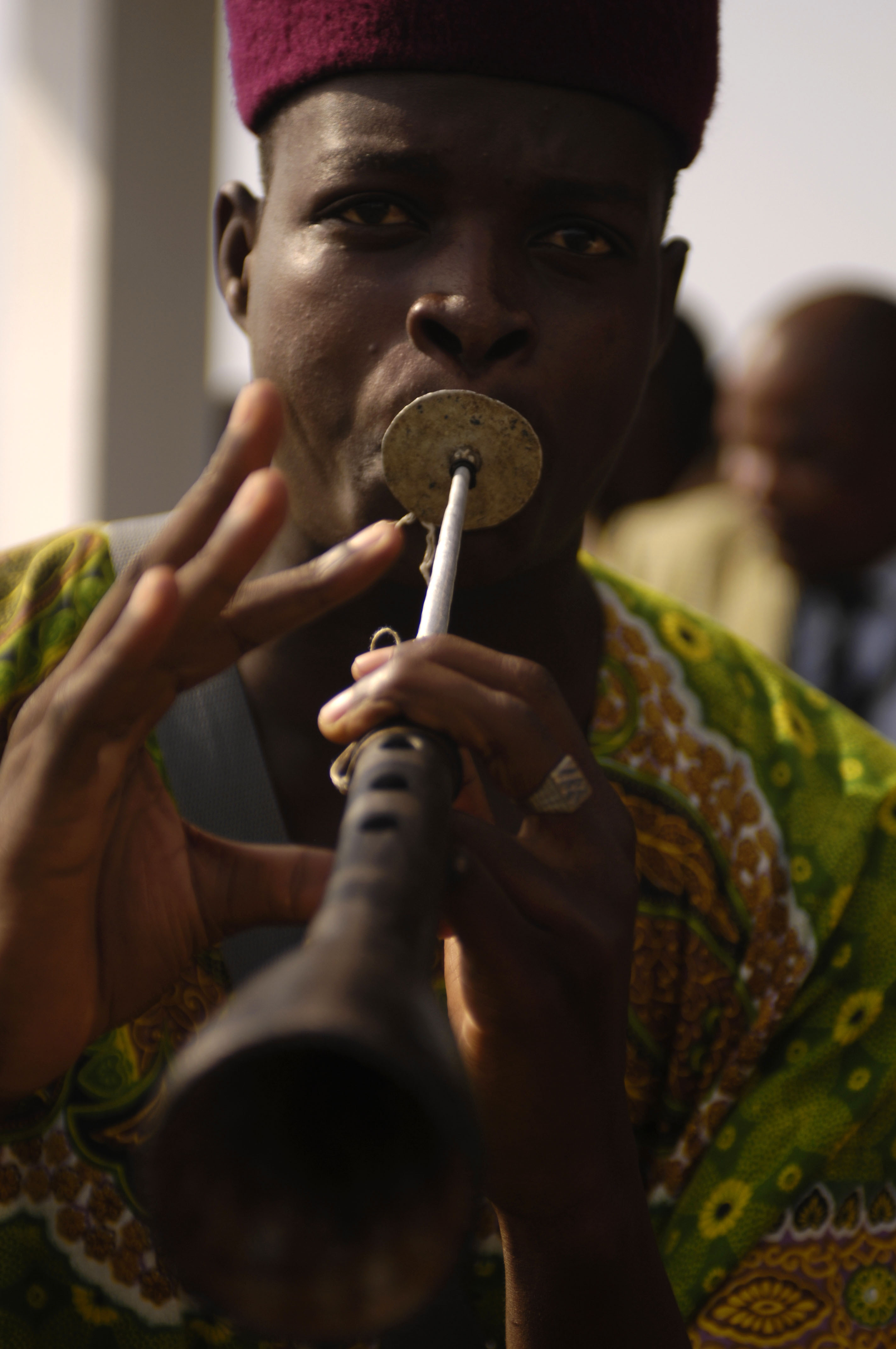
A musician plays traditional African music during the closing ceremony of French RECAMP-concept (reinforcement of African peacekeeping capacities) in Douala, November 23, 2006

Religious holidays in Cameroon include:

- Christian: Good Friday, Easter Sunday, Easter Monday, Pentecost, Ascension Thursday and Palm Sunday
- Muslim: Eid ul-Fitr, Eid ul-Adha and Ramadan

== Politics ==
Since an amendment was added to the Cameroon Constitution in 1992, Cameroon has been a multi-party state, which means there are multiple parties that have the potential to gain power over the government. Cameroon's first president, Ahmadou Ahidjo, was in power from 1960 to 1982. The president holds executive power for seven years, for a maximum of two terms. The president and his cabinet hold the main power at the national level, while at the local level, the prefet and sous-prefet hold the most power. Getting a government position can happen several different ways: Regional background, ethical background, party loyalty, and who you know. The national and local levels have been known to work together, even though they have to deal with their own separate issues from each other.

== Religion ==
Cameroon culture consists of numerous religions including Christianity (about 70%), Islam (about 30%), and many other indigenous religions. The citizens of Cameroon are entitled to freedom of religion, as it is stated within their constitution. Therefore, citizens are free to practice any religion they choose, without harassment or forceful conversion. The northern part of Cameroon is heavily occupied by the Fulani people (Fula: Fulɓe; French: Peul or Peulh; also known Mbororo, though this has sometimes been seen as pejorative). The Fulani are mainly Muslims, because Islam is the dominant religion in the northern region. The western region is home of the Bamum people, an ethnic group that also practices the Islamic religion. The French-speaking people are often inhabitants of the southern and western regions and the majority of them are Catholic, while English-speaking citizens more to the west tend to be Protestants.

== Fashion ==
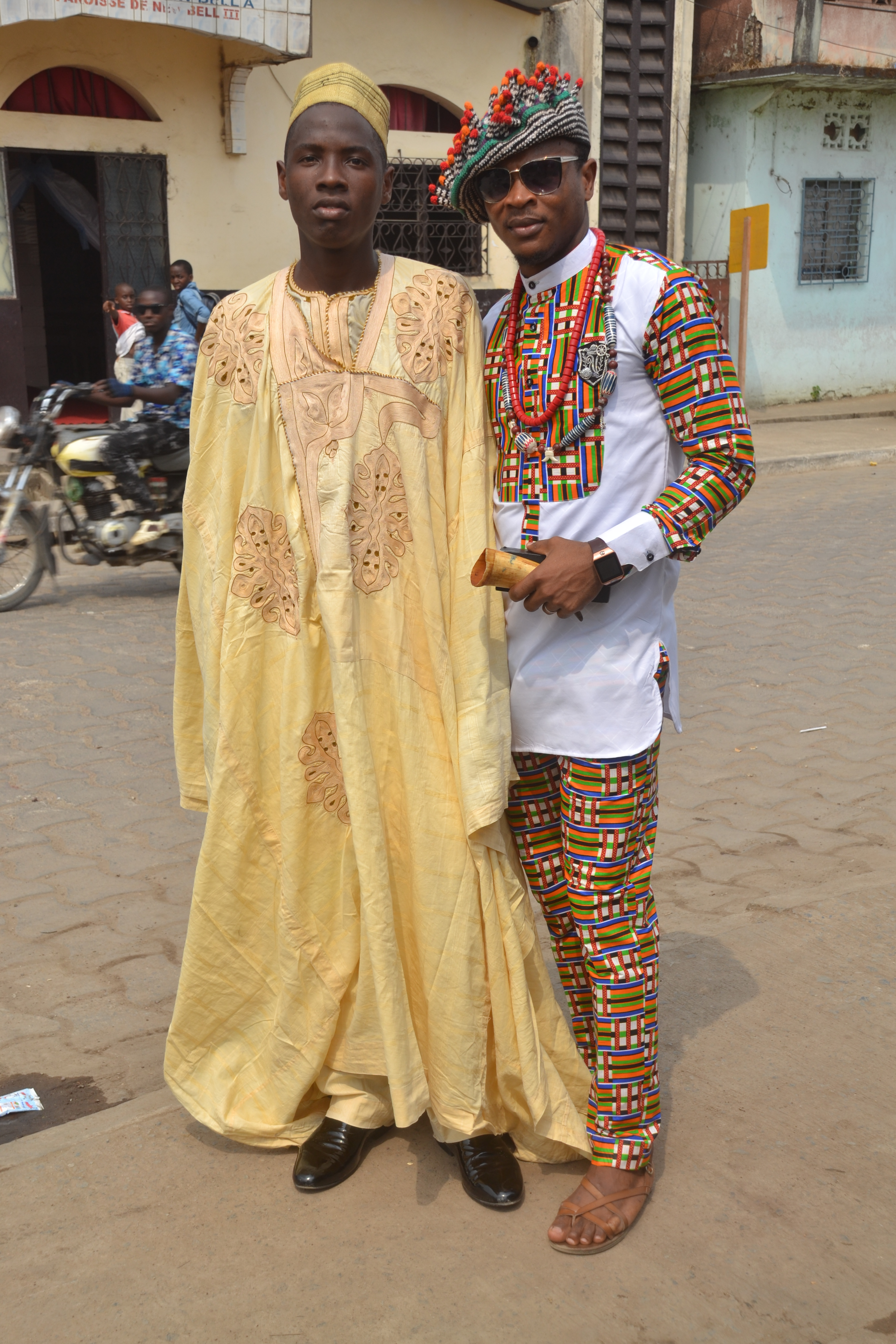
Cameroonian fashion is varied and often mixes modern and traditional elements. Note the wearing of sun glasses, Monk shoes, sandals, and a Smartwatch.

Cameroon's relatively large and diverse population is also diverse with respect to its contemporary fashion. Climate, religious, ethnic and cultural belief systems as well as influences from colonialism, imperialism and globalization are all reflected in the clothes worn by modern Cameroonians.

Notable Cameroonian articles of clothing include: Pagnes, a sarongs worn by Cameroon women, Chechia, a traditional hat, Kwa, a male handbag and Gandura, male custom attire. Wrappers and loincloths are used extensively by both women and men but their use varies by region with influences from Fulani styles more present in the north and Igbo and Yoruba styles in the south and west.

Imane Ayissi is one of Cameroon's top fashion designers and has received international recognition.

== Culture and traditions ==
Cameroon has 250-300 distinct groups and an estimated 300+ languages. These languages include the Akoose language, the Gbaya languages, the Fula language, the Gyele language, the Koonzime language, the Mundang language, the Ngiemboon language, and the Vengo language. Others include Ewondo, Bassa, Bamileke, Duala and Arabic in the North and Far-North regions.

Cameroon is divided into several provinces, which are dominated by specific ethnic or religious groups. Ethnic divisions often correspond to geography, which is also widely varied. Religious differences often correspond to colonial or other historical influence.

Partly through the influence of colonialism, there is a national culture, and two distinct regional cultures: the Anglophone and Francophone regions, which primarily speak English and French and use different legal systems. The national culture is established through public institutions such as school, the multiparty political system, shared history of colonialism and a national love of football.

Theatre of Cameroon is also another important aspect of local culture.

== Visual arts ==
Among the traditional sculptures of the country's cultural heritage, Bangwa ritual sculptures made by Ateu Atsa (c. 1840–1910) and anonymous wood carvers since the late 19th century, have been collected and exhibited in major Western museums.

== See also ==
- Cameroon
- Cuisine of Cameroon
- Languages of Cameroon
- Music of Cameroon
- List of writers from Cameroon
