= Marilyn Douala Bell =

Cameroonian economist

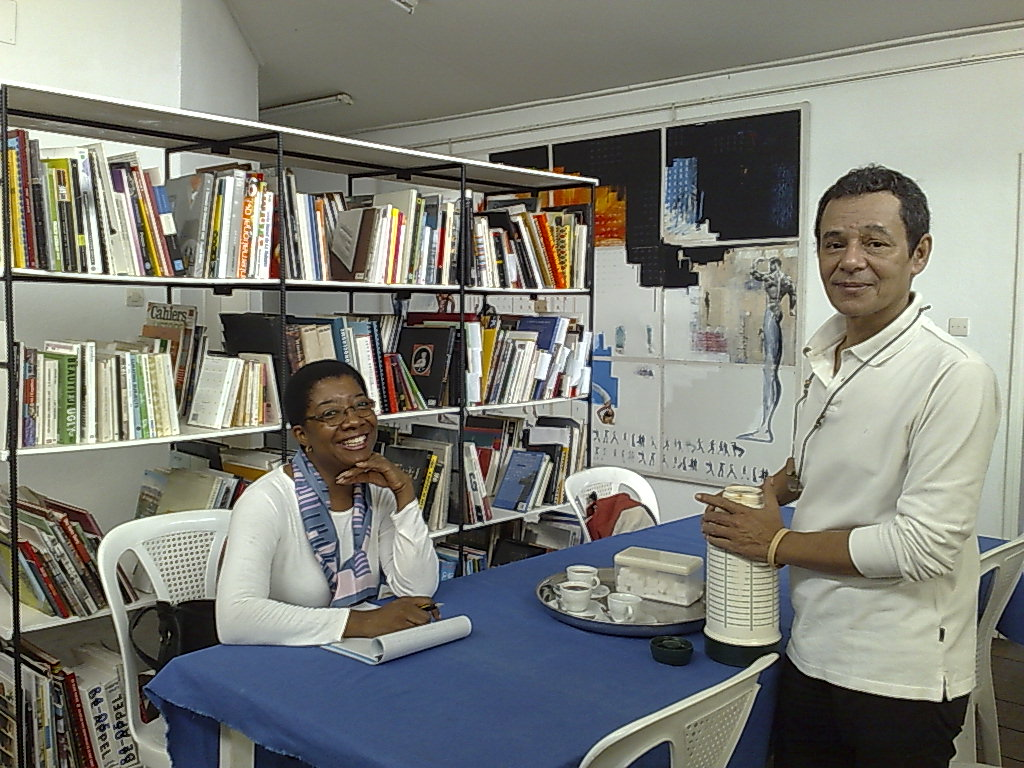
- Bell with her husband Dider Schaub in the office of doual'art.
- Born: 1957 (age 68–69); Douala, Cameroon
- Spouse: Didier Schaub

Marilyn Douala Bell is a socio-economist and current president of the cultural organisation doual'art based in Douala, Cameroon.

== Life ==
Marilyn Douala-Bell was born in Cameroon in 1957. She attended college in Paris, France where she completed a master's degree in development economics and met her husband, art historian, Didier Schaub. After getting married in 1986, they moved back to her hometown of Douala.

== Career ==
Starting in 1988, and lasting until 1993, she was a delegate and executive manager for the Central African region of the Association pour la Promotion des Initiatives Communautaires Africaines, or APICA, a pan-African Non-governmental organization based in Douala. From 1990 to 1991 she documented and analyzed negotiations between the local population, founders and public operators for urban development in cooperation with the APICA, the Association Française de Volontaire du Progrès and the Groupe de Recherches et d'Echanges Technologiques.

Since 1994 she has been collaborating as an international expert in urban and rural development with the Swiss cooperation DDC, the World Bank, the European Commission and with the German sustainable development and resource management cooperation Deutsche Gesellschaft für Internationale Zusammenarbeit. As of 2000, and continuing to present, she is in charge of urban participatory development policies for the decentralized cooperation of the French Alsace Region.

=== Cultural work ===
She co-founded the cultural organisation and contemporary art center doual'art in 1991. In 2007, she and her husband, created the Salon Urbain de Douala, a triennial festival on public art. She has contributed to numerous conferences, particularly on independent cultural institutions and on art and urban transformations, including the 2010 Kenya Workshop organised by the Mondriaan Foundation, and Curating in Africa Symposium at the Tate Modern in London.

== Awards ==
- Goethe Medal, 2021

== Publications ==
- M. Douala Bell and L. Babina (eds.), Douala in Translation. A view of the city and its creative transformative potentials, episode publishers, Rotterdam 2007.
- Lexique du dévéloppement à la base, Editions APICA, 1997.
- La crise structurelle des économies minières africaines: les enseignements des années 70, University of Sussex. Institute of Development Studies, 1984.
