= Simon Njami =

Cameroonian art curator (born 1962)

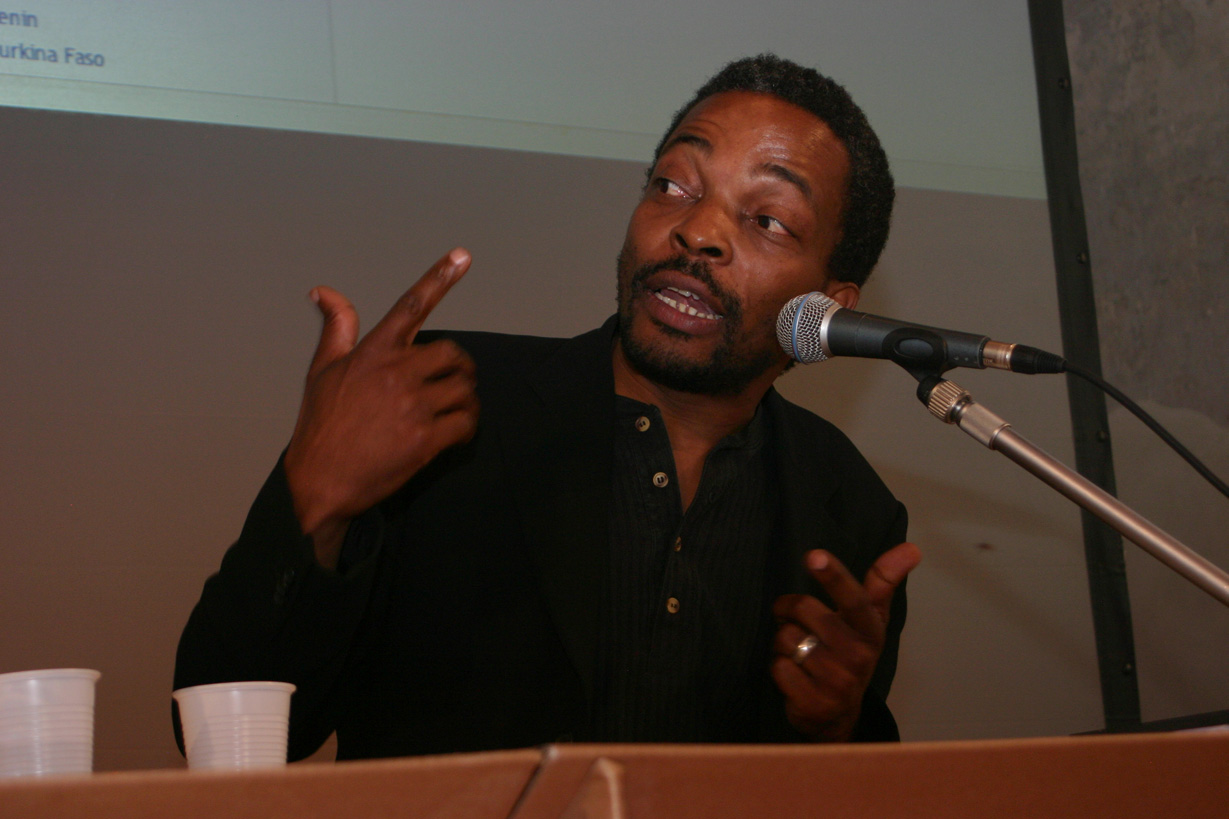
- Njami in 2007
- Born: 1962 (age 63–64); Lausanne, Switzerland
- Occupation: Art curator

Simon Njami (born 1962 in Lausanne) is a writer and an independent curator, lecturer, art critic and essayist.

== Career ==
=== Writing ===
Njami published his first novel, Cercueil et Cie, in 1985, followed by Les Enfants de la Cité in 1987, and Les Clandestins and African Gigolo in 1989. He has written biographies of James Baldwin and Léopold Sédar Senghor, several short texts, scripts for cinema, and documentary films.

Njami is the co-founder of Revue Noire, a journal of contemporary African and extra-occidental art, and he was visiting professor at the University of California, San Diego.

=== Curator ===
After conceiving the Ethnicolor Festival in Paris in 1987, Njami curated many international exhibitions being among the first ones to think and show African contemporary artists work on international stages. He has served as artistic director of Bamako Encounters, the African Photography Biennale, from 2001 to 2007. Njami is the curator of Africa Remix, shown in Düsseldorf (Museum Kunstpalast), London (Hayward Gallery), Paris (Centre Pompidou), Tokyo (Mori Museum), Stockholm (Moderna Museet) and Johannesburg (Johannesburg Art Gallery), from 2004 to 2007. He co-curated the first African Pavilion at the 52nd Venice Biennale. He curated the first African Art Fair, held in Johannesburg in 2008, and was the artistic director of Luanda Triennale (2010), Picha (Lubumbashi Biennale – 2010), SUD (Douala Triennale – 2010), among others exhibitions and international art events.

Njami's exhibition The Divine Comedy – Heaven, Hell, Purgatory by Contemporary African Artists was shown at MMK (Museum für Moderne Kunst, Frankfurt am Main) in 2014, SCAD Museum of Art in 2015 and at the Smithsonian Institution/National Museum of African Art, Washington, DC, in 2015.

Njami was the artistic director of the Edition 12 of Dak'art, the Dakar Biennale, in Senegal in 2016 and the Edition 13 of the Dakar Biennale in 2017. He curated Afriques Capitales in La Villette (Paris) and Gare Saint-Sauveur (Lille), in France, in 2017.

Njami is currently directing AtWork, an itinerant and digital project with Lettera27 Foundation, in partnership with Moleskine, as well as the Pan African Master Classes in Photography, a project that he conceived with the Goethe Institute.

Njami is the Art Adviser of the Sindika Dokolo Foundation (Luanda) and the artistic director of the Donwahi Foundation (Abidjan) and member of the scientific boards of numerous museums.

== Jury work ==
After having been invited to be part of numerous art and photography juries, such as the World Press Photo contest, Njami served on the judging panels that chose Lawrence Abu Hamdan for the Edvard Munch Art Award in 2019 and Ashfika Rahman for the Future Generation Art Prize in 2023. In 2023, he was briefly part of the six-person search committee for an artistic director of Documenta’s 2027 edition but resigned shortly after.

== Publications by Njami ==
- Cercueil et Cie, novel, Paris: Lieu Commun, 1985
- Les Enfants de la Cité, novel, Paris: Gallimard, Folio Junior, 1987
- African Gigolo, novel, Paris: Seghers, 1989
- Les Clandestins, novel, Paris: Gallimard, Folio Junior, 1989
- James Baldwin ou le devoir de violence, biography, Paris: Seghers, 1991
- C'était Senghor, biography, Paris: Fayard, 2006
- La Mécanique des souvenirs, Paris: JC Lattès, 2024

== Exhibitions (selected) ==
- "I've been abducted hundreds of times", a solo show by Gosha Ostretsov, curated by Simon Njami, Venice Biennale, Palazzo Nani Bernardo, May–June, 2017.
- Afriques Capitales, La Villette, Paris, and Gare Saint-Sauveur, Lille, France, March - September, 2017.
- The City in the Blue Daylight, Dak'art, The Dakar Biennale, 2 May - 3 June 2016
- Santu Mofokeng, Mets Solo, Fondazione Fotografia Modena, March 2016
- Something Else, Off Biennale Cairo, 2015
- Après Eden, Maison Rouge, Paris, 2015
- Xenopolis, Deutsche Bank KunstHalle, Berlin, 2015
- The Divine Comedy: Heaven, Purgatory and Hell Revisited by Contemporary African Artists, MMK (Museum für Moderne Kunst), Frankfurt am Main, 2014 - SCAD Museum, Savannah, USA, 2014-2015 - Smithsonian Institution/ African Art Museum, Washington, 2015
- WIR SIND ALLE BERLINER: 1884–2014, SAVVY Contemporary, Berlin, Germany, 15 November 2014 – 28 February 2015
- Portrait of Marrakech, Magnum Photos and Marrakech Museum for Photography and Visual Art (MMP+), 2013
- Art at Work, co-produced by the Palais des Beaux-Arts, Brussels, co-curator with David Adjaye, Kampala, Ouganda, 2012.
- Dokolo/Revue Noire Collection, Bamako encounters, 2011
- Moataz Nasr, Chain reaction, Chateau de Blandy, France, 2011
- Art at Work, co-produced by the Palais des Beaux-Arts, Brussels, co-curator with David Adjaye, Ouagadougou, Addis Ababa, 2010
- A Collective Diary, Herzilya Museum, Israel, 2010
- Fiction#3, Bili Bidjocka, Abbaye de Maubuisson, France, May 2010
- A useful dream, Palais des Beaux-Arts, Brussels, June 2010
- As you like it (First African contemporary art fair), Johannesburg, March 2008
- Artistic director of the Luanda Triennale, sept/dec 2010
- Artistic Director of Picha (Lubumbabshi biennale), Oct 2010
- Artistic director of SUD (Douala triennale), dec 2010
- Ordinary pain, Noorderlicht festival Groningen, September 2009
- Made in Africa, The Dokolo Collection, National Museum, Nairobi, 2009
- Beyond the Desert, Darb 1718, Cairo, 2009
- Co-curator of the First African Pavilion at the 52e Venice Biennale, 2007
- The Invention of memory, Réunion Island, September 2007
- Chief curator of the VIIe Rencontres de Bamako, November 2007
- L'image révélée, Tunis, 2006
- Cities scape, ARCO 2006
- Chief curator of les Rencontres africaines de la Photographie, Bamako, 2005
- Africa Remix, Düsseldorf, Londres, Paris, Tokyo, Stockholm, Johannesburg, 2004/2007
- Un prisme lucide – photographies, Biennale de São Paulo, São Paulo, 2004
- Chief curator of les Rencontres africaines de la Photographie, Bamako, 2003
- Up and Coming, ARCO, Madrid, 2003
- Co-commissaire de Next Flag, Bruxelles, Zürich, 2002
- Chief curator of les Rencontres africaines de la Photographie, Bamako, 2001
- Le temps de l'Afrique, Las Palmas, 2000, Madrid, 2001
- Biennale d'Art contemporain de Dakar (co-curator), Dakar, mai 2000
- L'Afrique par elle-même, photographies (co-curator), Paris, São Paulo, Londres, Bamako, Washington, Berlin, Cape Town, 1998/1999
- Traces of Identity, photographies, Toronto, 1997
- Suites Africaines (co-curator), Couvent des Cordeliers, Paris, 1997
- Die Andere Reise, Vienne, 1996
- Otro Pais, Las Palmas, Palma de Majorque, Barcelone, 1995
- Paris Connection, Paris/San Francisco, 1991
- Ethnicolor, Paris, 1987

== Texts and co-editions (selection) ==
- Ethnicolor, edited with Bruno Tilliette, Autrement, Paris, 1987
- "El Anatsui, un artiste sur le fil de l'histoire", in El Anatsui, A Sculpted History of Africa, October Gallery, Saffron Books, London, 1998
- Remembrance of things Past, Ten years of debate about African Contemporary Art, Tobu Museum of Art, 1998
- Co-editor and co-author of Rotimi Fani-Kayodé et Alex Hirst, Photographs, Revue Noire/Autograph, Paris/Londres, 1996
- Co-editor of Pierre Verger, Le Messager, photographies, Revue Noire, Paris 1993, DAP, New York, 1996
- Co-editor and co-author of the Anthology of African Photography, Revue Noire, Paris, 1997, DAP, New York, 1999
- "L'invention de la vie", in Peut-on être vivant en Afrique, Presses Universitaires de France, 2000
- "Der Kurator als Nackter König, Kontextualisierung und Dekontextualisierung", in the catalogue South meets West, Kunsthalle Bern, 2000
- "Les Spores de l'étamine", in the catalogue of the exhibition Afriques, Barcelona, 2001
- "Chroniques d'un millénaire / Chronicles of a Millennium", introduction au catalogue des IVè Rencontres de la Photographie Africaine de Bamako, Eric Koehler, Paris, 2001
- Pascale Marthine Tayou, Between himself and the Other, with Pierre-Olivier Rollin, text for the documenta 11, published by the Communauté Wallonie-Bruxelles, 2002
- Das doppelte glück der sanftmut und der bitterkeit, in the catalogue of Africa Apart, NGBK, Berlin, 2002
- A certain View of Mankind, for the exhibition Portraits of Pride, Samuel Fosso, Seydou Keita, Malick Sidibé, Moderna Museet Stockholm, Raster Forlag, 2002
- Cronicas del hijo de un siglo, Espacio C, Camargo, 2002
- El Corazon de las luces, in Planeta Kurtz, Random House Mondadori, Barcelona, 2002
- Jane Alexander, A Turbulent Silence, introduction to the catalogue of Daimler Chrysler Award, Hatje Cantz, 2002
- Co-curator and co-author of BLINK, photographies, Phaidon Press, London, 2002
- Co-editor and co-author of the Antholoy of XXth Century African Art, Revue Noire, Paris, 2001, DAP, New York, 2002
- Lettre à une jeune fille, in Babylon Babies – Marie-Jo Lafontaine, Hatje Cantz, 2003
- Memory in the Skin, Looking both Ways catalogue, Museum for African Art, New York, Snoeck, Gent, 2003
- Mozart and Me, Fernando Alvim – the Psychoanalysis of the World, Ingrid Mwangi, 2003
- The End of the Empire, catalogue de l'exposition Happiness, Mori Art Museum, Tankosha Publishing Co, Kyoto/Tokyo, 2003
- Le mystère révélé/ The Mystery revealed, introduction au catalogue des V^{e} Rencontres de la Photographie Africaine de Bamako, Eric Koehler, Paris, 2003
- Zineb Sedira, An Assumed Autobiography, Corner House, London, 2004
- A Young Woman in Quest, the work of Loulou Cherinet, catalogue Biennale de Sydney, 2004
- Chaos et Métamorphose, introduction à l’exposition Africa Remix, Hatje Cantz, 2004
- Claude Rosticher : la poésie à l’œuvre, Monaco, 2004
- Editor of L’Afrique en regards, une brève histoire de la photographie, Filigranes, Paris, 2005
- Amal Kenawy, catalogue de la Biennale de Sydney, 2005
- L'image révélée, catalogue of exhibition, 2006
- Introduction to Youssef Nabil's works (catalogue), 2007
- Introduction to Ghada Amer's works, 2007
- Introduction to Moataz Nasr's works (catalogue), 2008
- Introduction de Andrew Tshabangu's works (monograph), 2008
- Introduction to Ingrid Mwangi's works (catalogue), 2008
- The constant Gardner, an introduction to Mechac Gaba's work, 2009
- Un mystère à conserver (on the French photographer Laurence Leblanc.), 2009
- Une illusion sophistiquée (on the Ethiopian photographer Aida Muluneh), 2009
- Street Urchin, works by Kiluanji Kia Henda, Steidl, Germany, 2010
- Dorian Gray in Bangui, works by Samuel Fosso, La Fabrica/Revue Noire Publishers, France, Spain, 2010
- Me and Ms A., Exhibition book of Jane Alexander's works, 2010
- Yinka Shonibare, MBE : le masque transparent, Exhibition book of Yinka Shonibare's Works, Nouveau Musée National de Monaco, 5 Continents, 2010
- Editor of the artist's book, Moataz Nasr, The other Side of the Mirror, Gliori publishers, 2010
- Samuel Fosso, a dandy in Bangui, Revue Noire/La Fabrica, 2011
- The Impudence of the Stars, in Light Years, an exhibition of the Spanish artist Eugènia Balcells, Edicions de l'Eixample, Barcelona, 2012
- The Re-enchantment of the World, an introduction to the work of the Congolese artist Pume, Revue Noire, Paris, 2012
- Stabat Mater, an introduction to the work of the Haitian artist Mario Benjamin, Revue Noire, Paris, 2012
- Fictional Faculties, IUAV, University of Venice, Venice, 2012
- Invisibility, Fondazione di Venezia, Venice, 2012
- Sam Nhlengethwa, Variations on a thème, 2012
- Ananias Léki, Fragments, Goethe-Institut Nairobi, 2012
- Allons enfants !, in Intense Proximité, Une anthologie du Proche et du Lointain, La Triennale, 2012
- Of Curating and Audiences/ Art at Work, 2012
- Zwelethu Mthethwa, a contemporary myth, Revue Noire/La Fabrica, 2012
- Issa Samb (The stranger), Word ! Word ? Word !, edited by Koyo Kouoh, Office for Contemporary Art Norway (OCA) and Raw Material Company, 2013
- Imagined Communities, in Condition Report, Symposium on Building Art Institutions in Africa, edited by Koyo Kouoh, Hatje Cantz and Raw Material Company, Dakar, 2013
- The Burst of Silence, in Deutscher Pavilion 2013, 55th International Art Exhibition, edited by Susanne Gaensheimer, Gestalten, 2013
- "Heaven can wait", introduction to the catalogue of the photographer Thabiso Sekgala, 2014
- Le cœur absolu, on the V12 Laraki by Eric Van Hove, monograph, Marrakech, 2014
- Le prince à la tour abolie, Thierry Fontaine, L'invention d'une île, 2014
- Untranquil Serenity, in Mehdi-Georges Lahlou. Confused Memory. Paris: Éditions Lord Byron, 2023

== Cinema and documentary films ==
- Balck Micmac (collaboration), a film by Thomas Gilou, 1986
- Black Power, Black Music: a documentary film in a thematic evening written and directed with Jean-François Bizot, Arte, 1994
- Le complot d'Aristote (screenplay), a film by Jean Pierre Bekolo, 1996
- Lhoooby, documentary on African Contemporary Art, co-directed and written with Pascale Marthine Tayou and Jean-Loup Pivin, Arte, 1997
- Le Président, a film by Jean Pierre Bekolo, 2013
