= Salifou Lindou =

Self-taught artist (born 1965)

- Born: 1965 (age 60–61); Foumban, Cameroon
- Education: Self‑taught; one year at École des Arts Décoratifs, Strasbourg
- Known for: Painting; Sculpture; Installation art

Salifou Lindou (born in 1965 in Foumban, Cameroon) is a self-taught artist who lives and works in Douala.

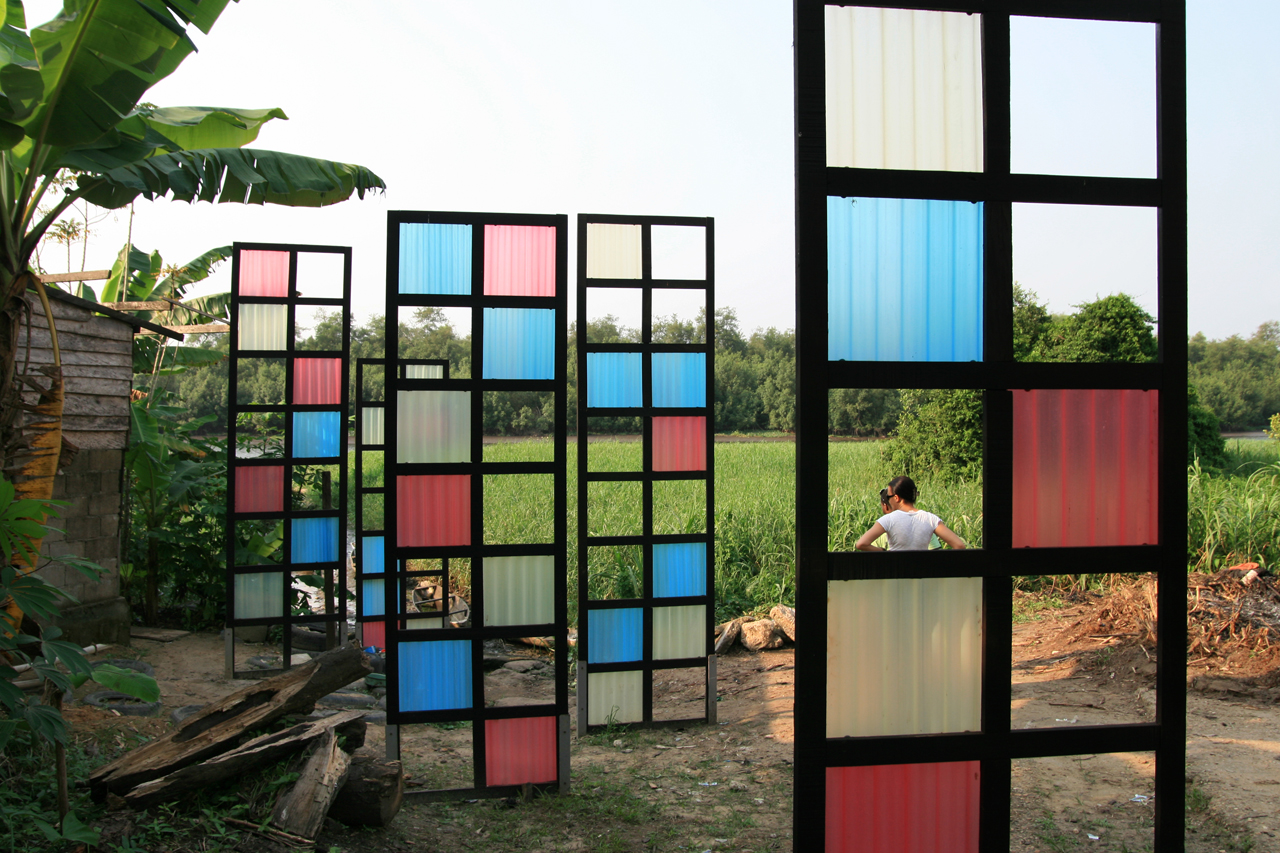
Face à l’eau is a public artwork created by Salifou Lindou, located in Douala, Cameroun.

== Bibliography ==
- Africanh (2014). Salifou Lindou.
- Contemporary African Art Fair. Salifou Lindou
- Enough Room for Space. Salifou Lindou
- Africultures. Salifou Lindou
- Salifou Lindou
- L'ivresse du Papillon, p. 40 à 53, Lionnel Manga, édition Artistafrica
- Pensa, Iolanda (Ed.) 2017. Public Art in Africa. Art et transformations urbaines à Douala /// Art and Urban Transformations in Douala. Genève: Metis Presses. ISBN 978-2-94-0563-16-6
