= Les Mots écrits de New Bell =

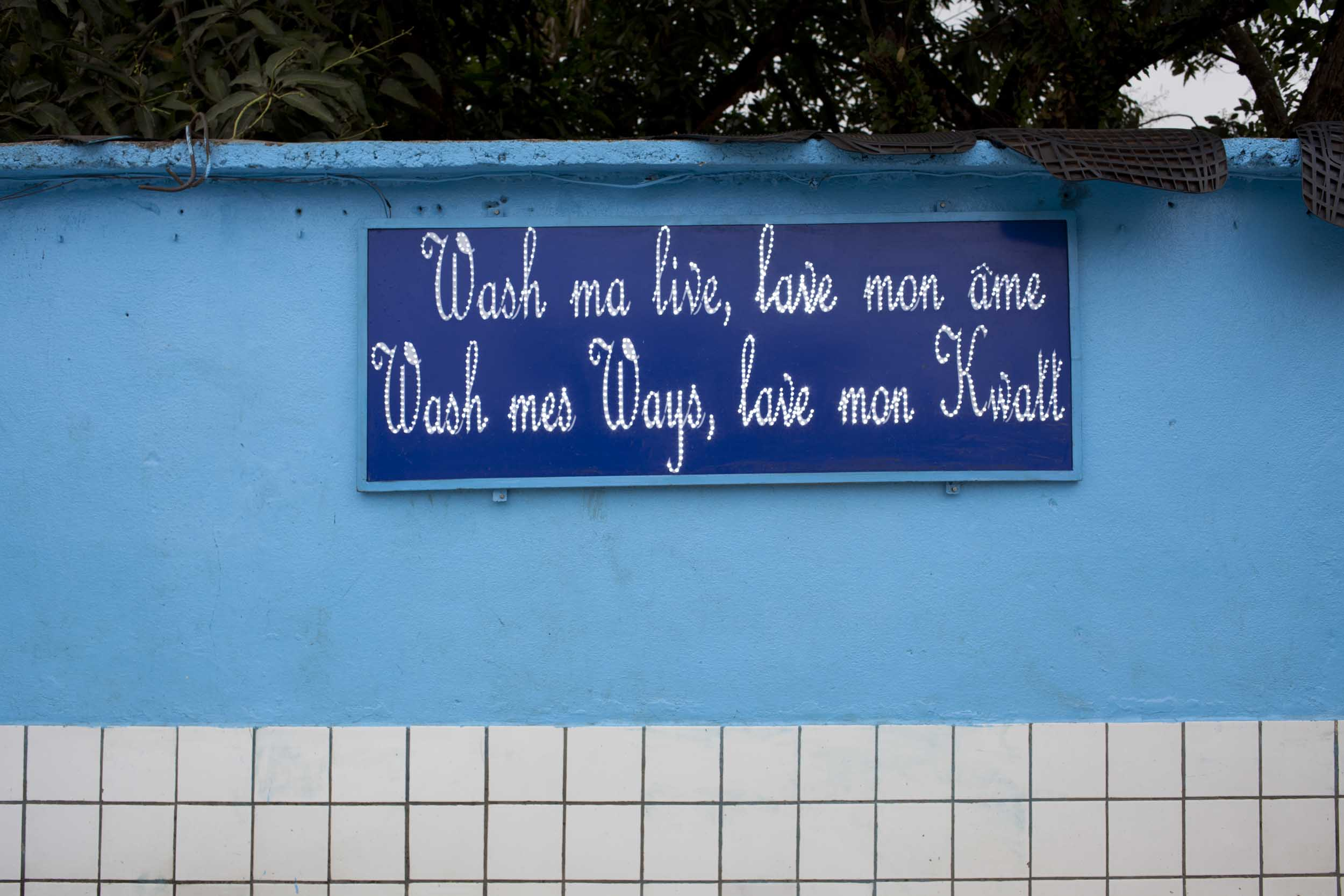
- Artist: Hervé Yamguen
- Year: 2008-2010
- Type: Wall paintings
- Location: New Bell Ngangué, Douala, Cameroon; 4.0204°N 9.738°E
- Owner: Municipality of Douala

Les Mots écrits de New Bell is a set of six mural installations created by Hervé Yamguen and located in Douala (Cameroon).

== The artwork ==
Les Mots Écrits de New Bell is a set of six mural installations by Hervé Yamguen. It is part of "Liquid projects", a program of SUD2010 that financed the production of permanent artworks dedicated to the theme of water in the neighborhoods of residence of four local artists. In New Bell, Yamguen worked in collaboration with two local rappers, Picsou and Moctomoflar, engaging them in the recording (and releasing) of a four songs album about water. During the production process the artist also introduced young people and local residents to the project through night performances and discussion meetings. From the lyrics of rappers, Yamguen extracted text fragments, reproducing them on six façades of Ngangue's neighborhood that were spontaneously offered by locals.

Les Mots Écrits de New Bell were produced on different supports: neon lights, tile mosaics, mirrors, iron rods, and painting. The text fragments selected by Yamguen clearly depict the reality of hardship and hope of New Bell's inhabitants.

Here the texts:

1. Après le temps mort vient le temps vif comme un coup de foudre. Ne pleure pas maman, tous les yeux de la ville pleuvent sur moi. Tranquille papa on ne panique pas;
2. La vie saine, la joie de se sentir bien, l’envie de vivre de bonheur;
3. Se sentir bien;
4. La nuit le bonheur c’est dans les moustiquaires;
5. Wash ma life, Lave mon âme; Wash mes ways, Lave mon kwatt;
6. Dans les eaux sales du quartier, dans ma ruelle, ma jeunesse rebelle.

However, two of these installations were removed: the first one – “Wash ma life, Lave mon âme, Wash mes ways, Lave mon kwatt” – for degradation, due to its position on the wall of a car washer; the second one – “Dans les eaux sales du quartier, dans ma ruelle, ma jeunesse rebelle” – was vandalized by the owner of the wall due to hard discussions with the rapper who wrote the sentence.

The inauguration of the artwork took place during SUD - Salon Urbain de Douala 2010.

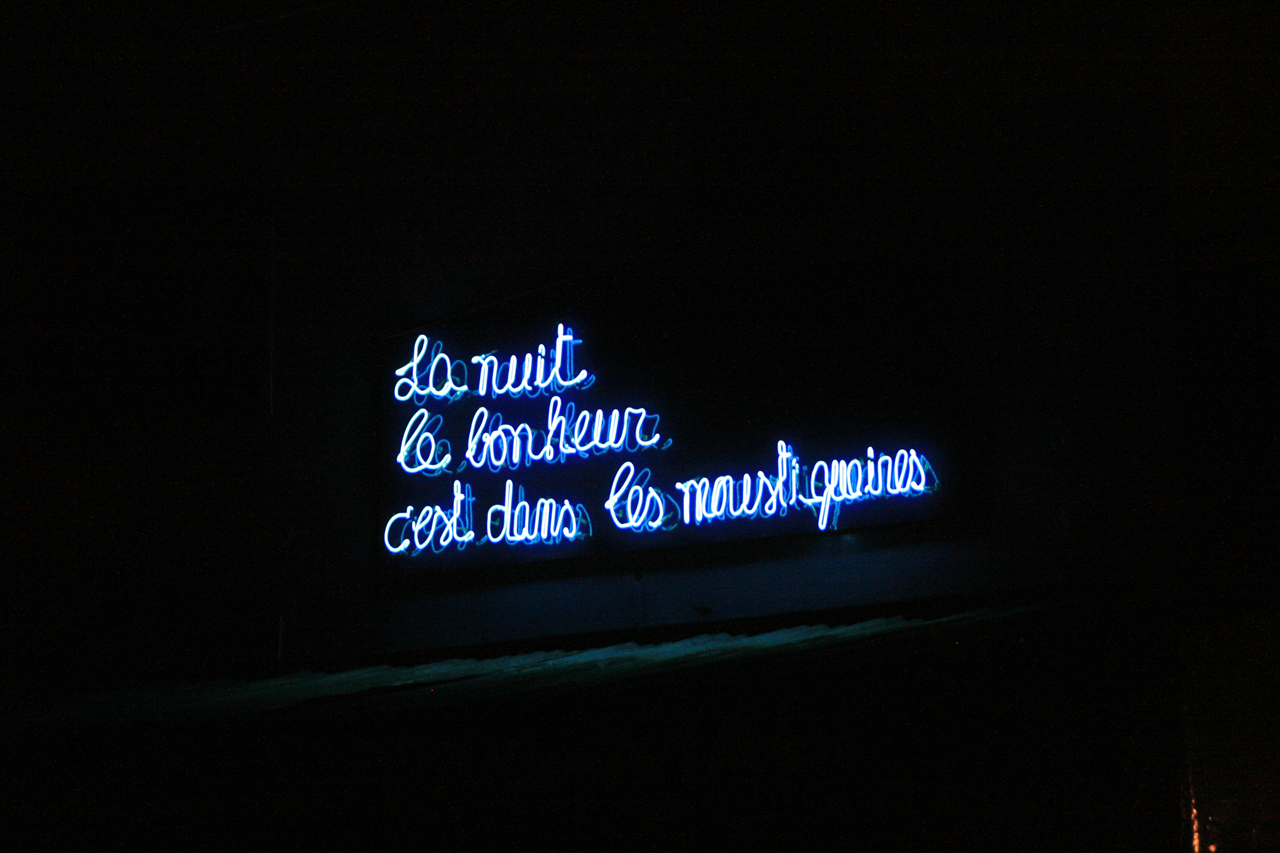

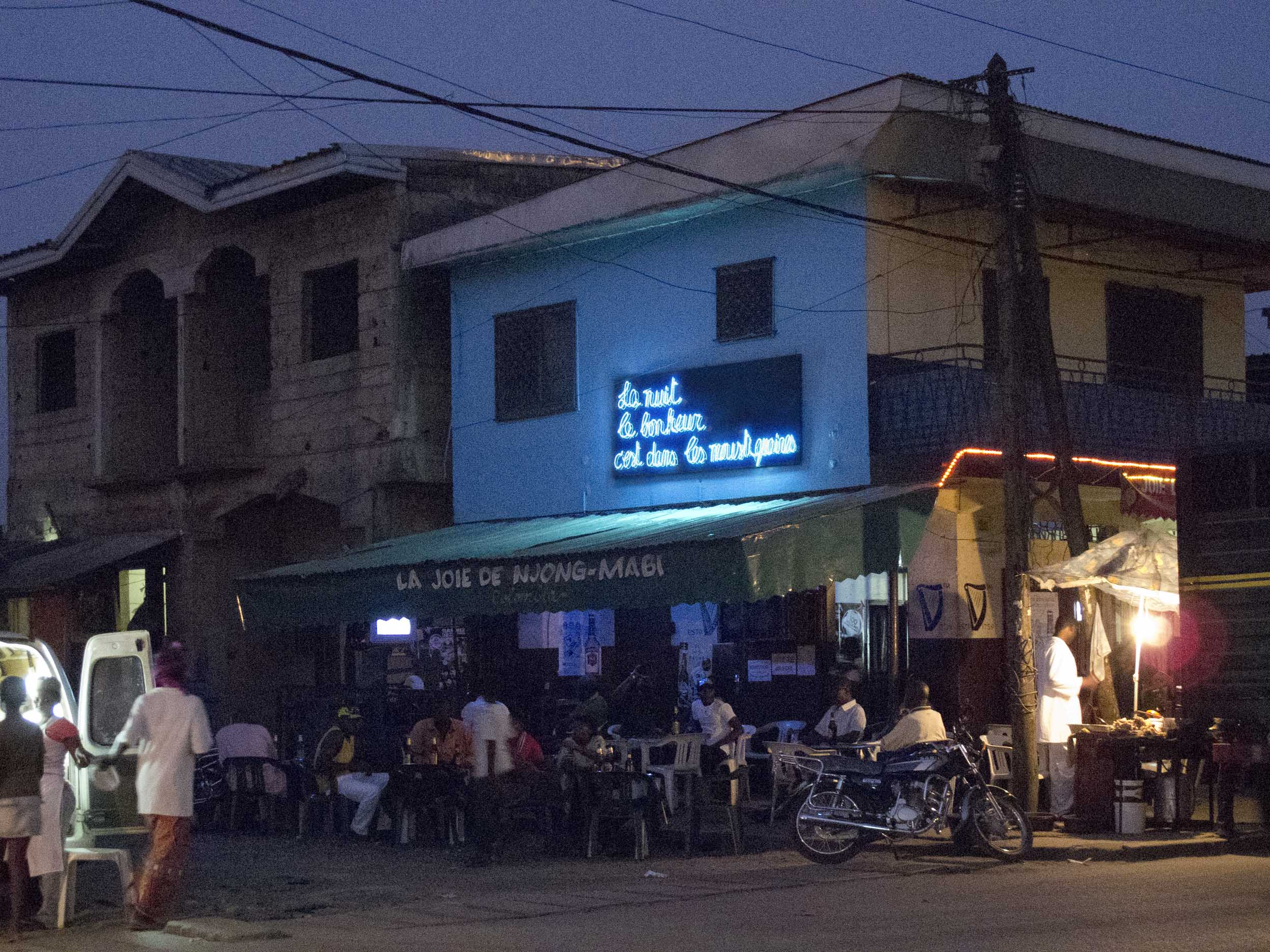

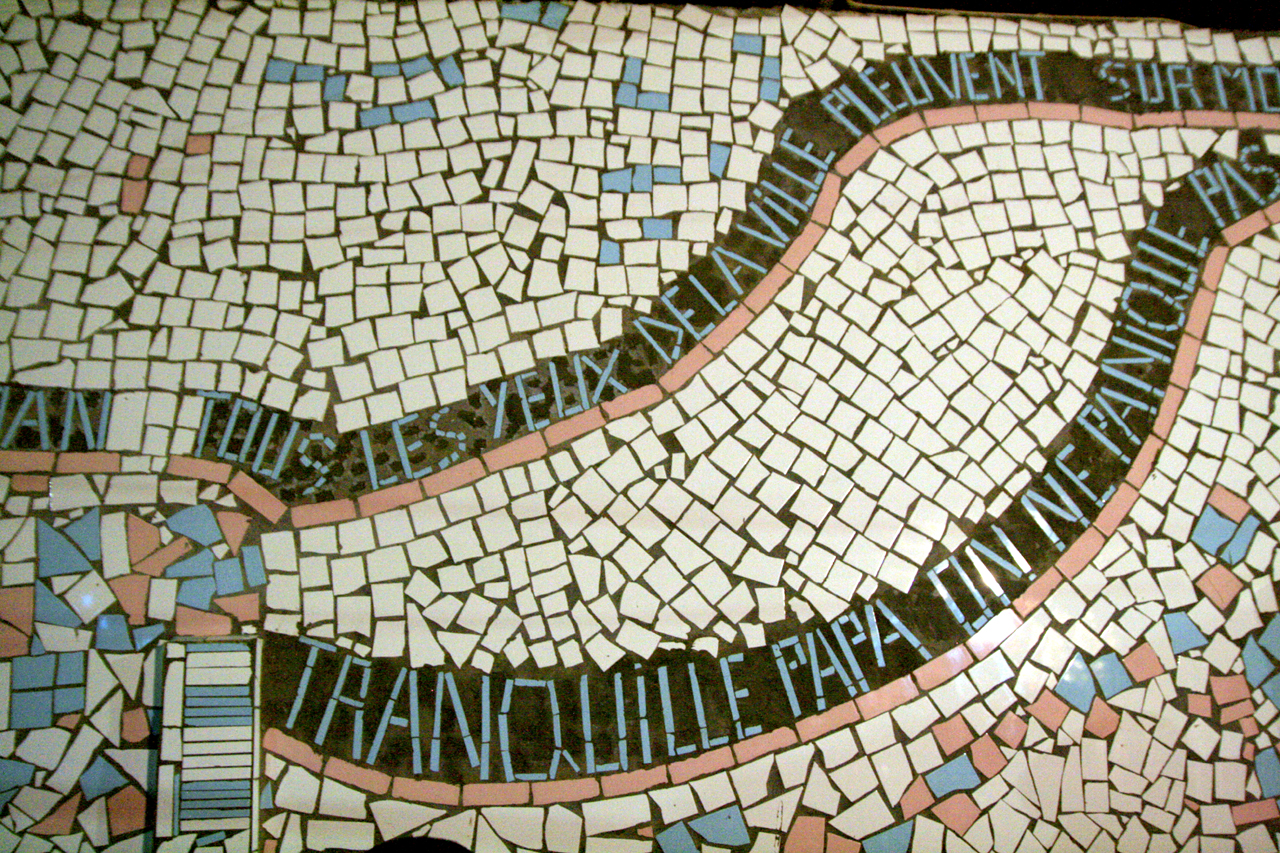

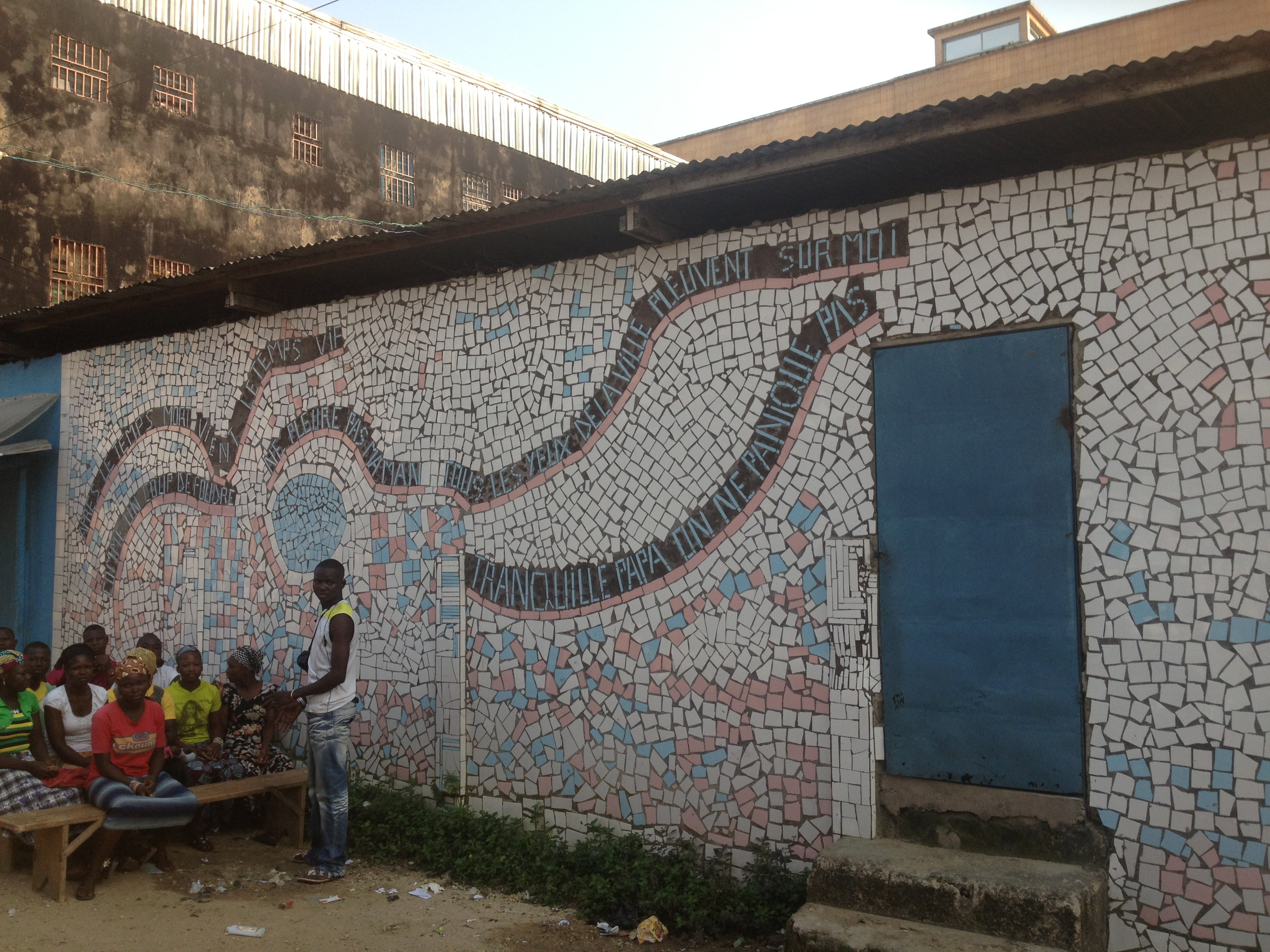

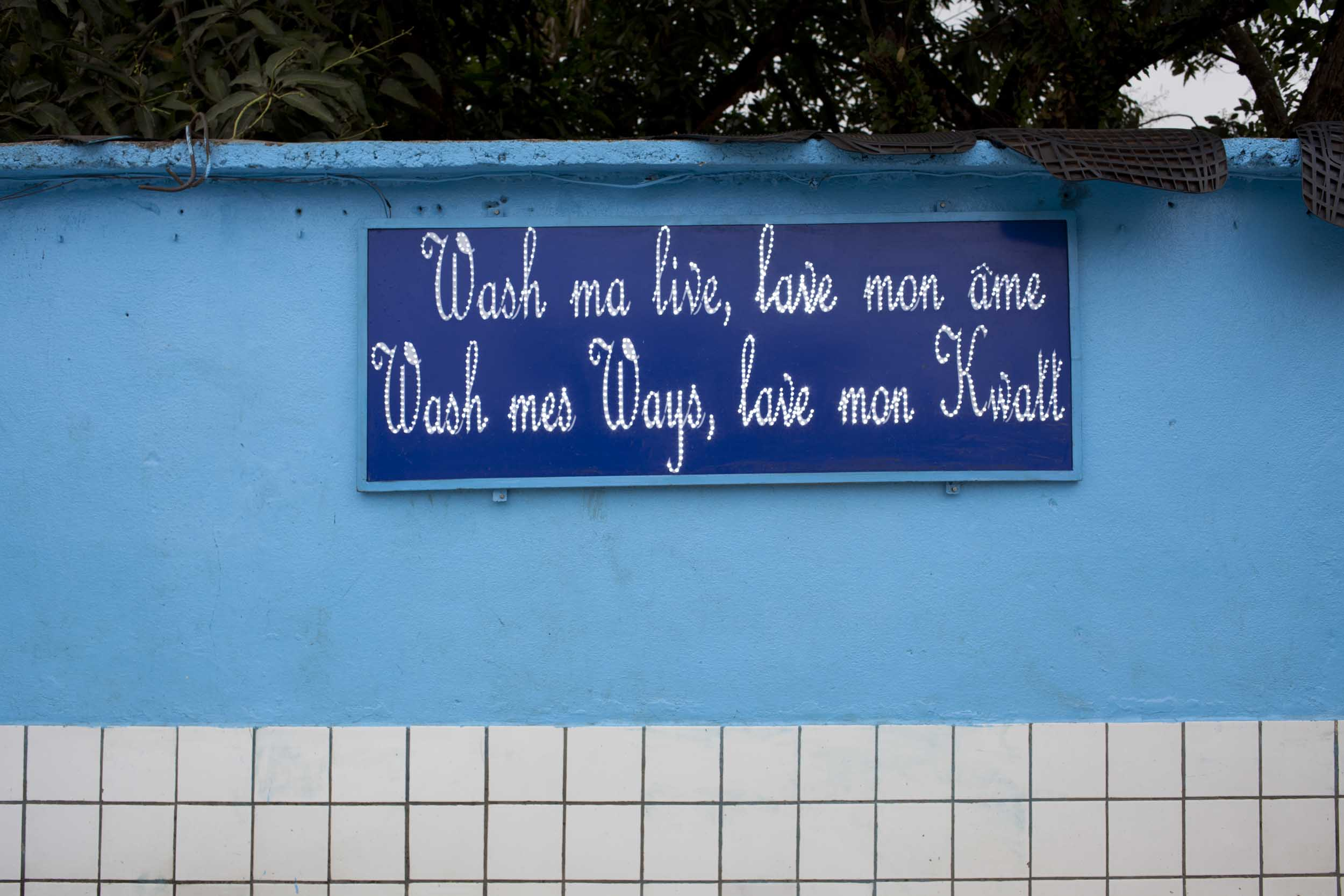

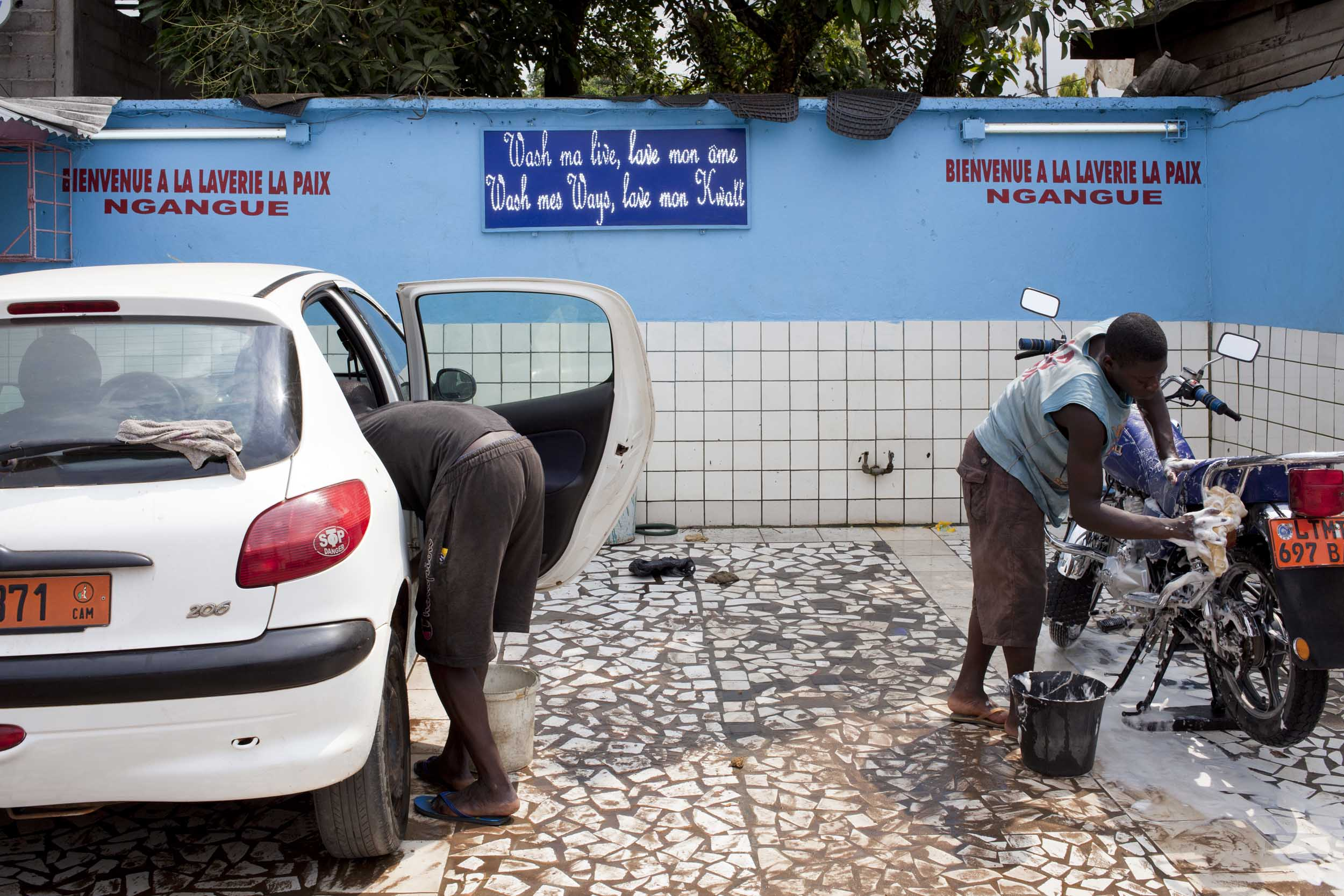

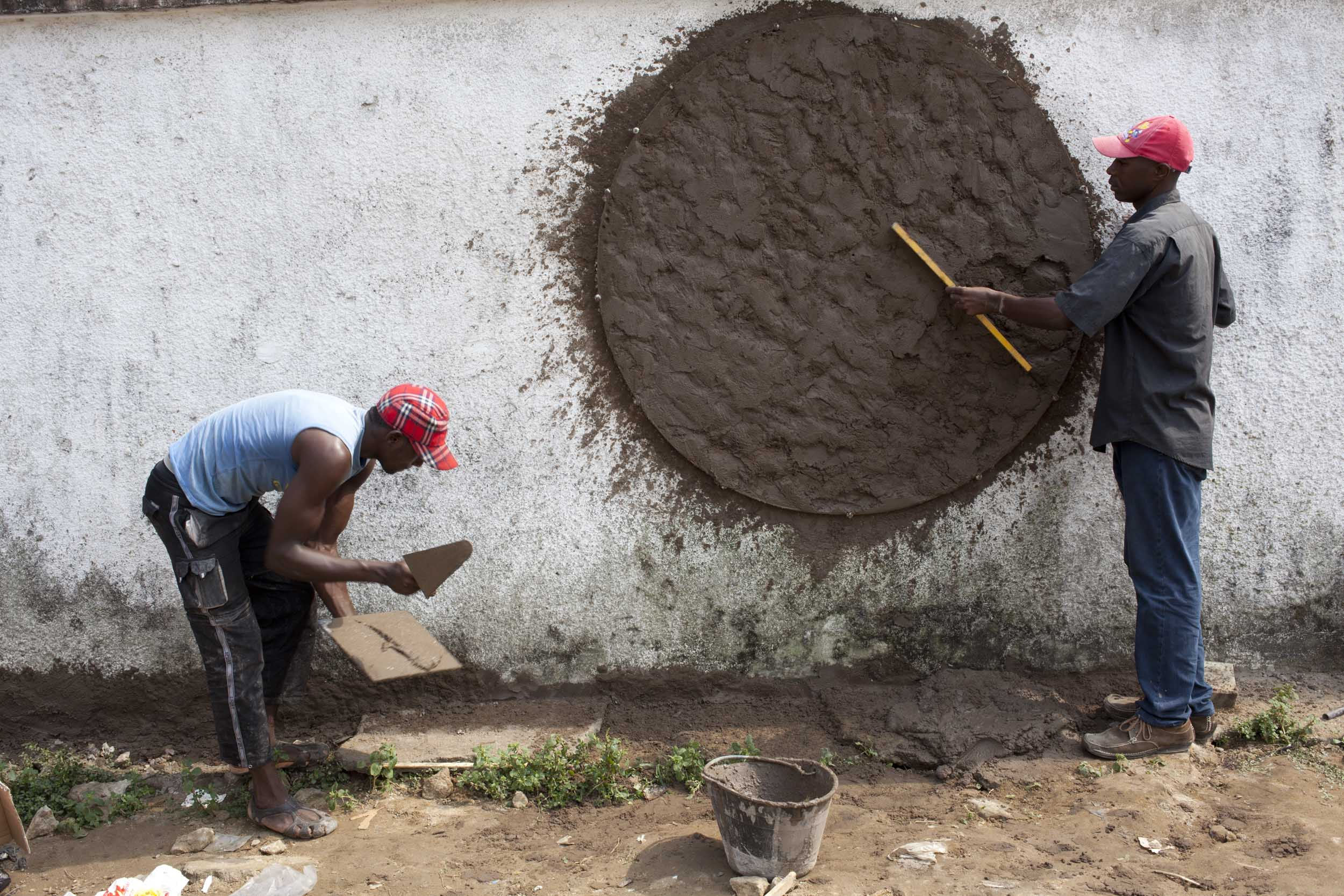

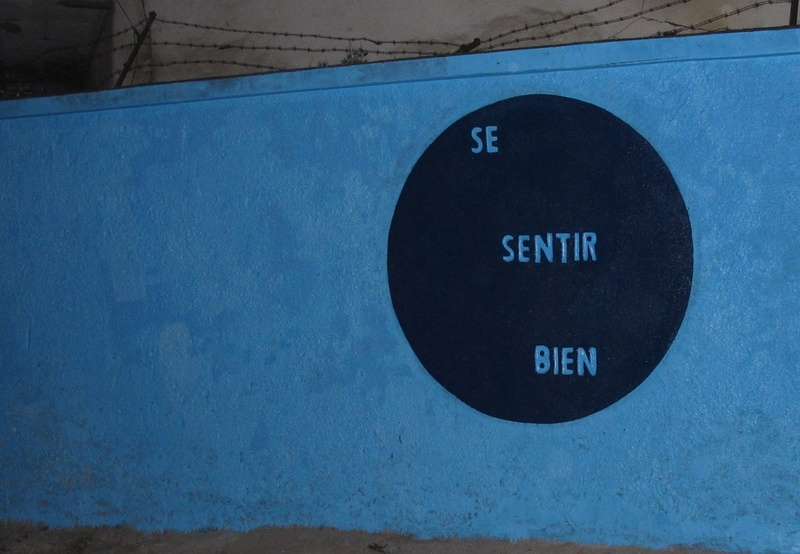

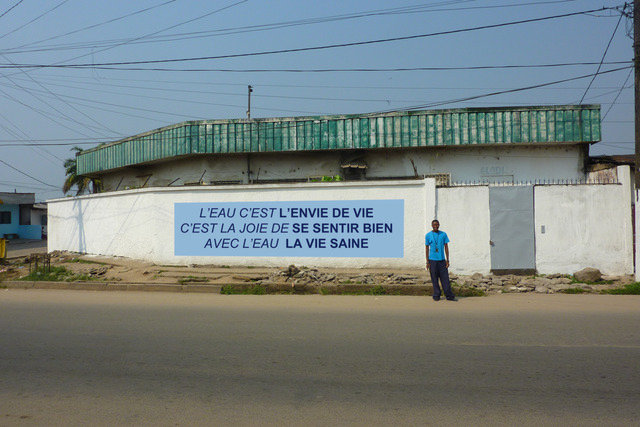

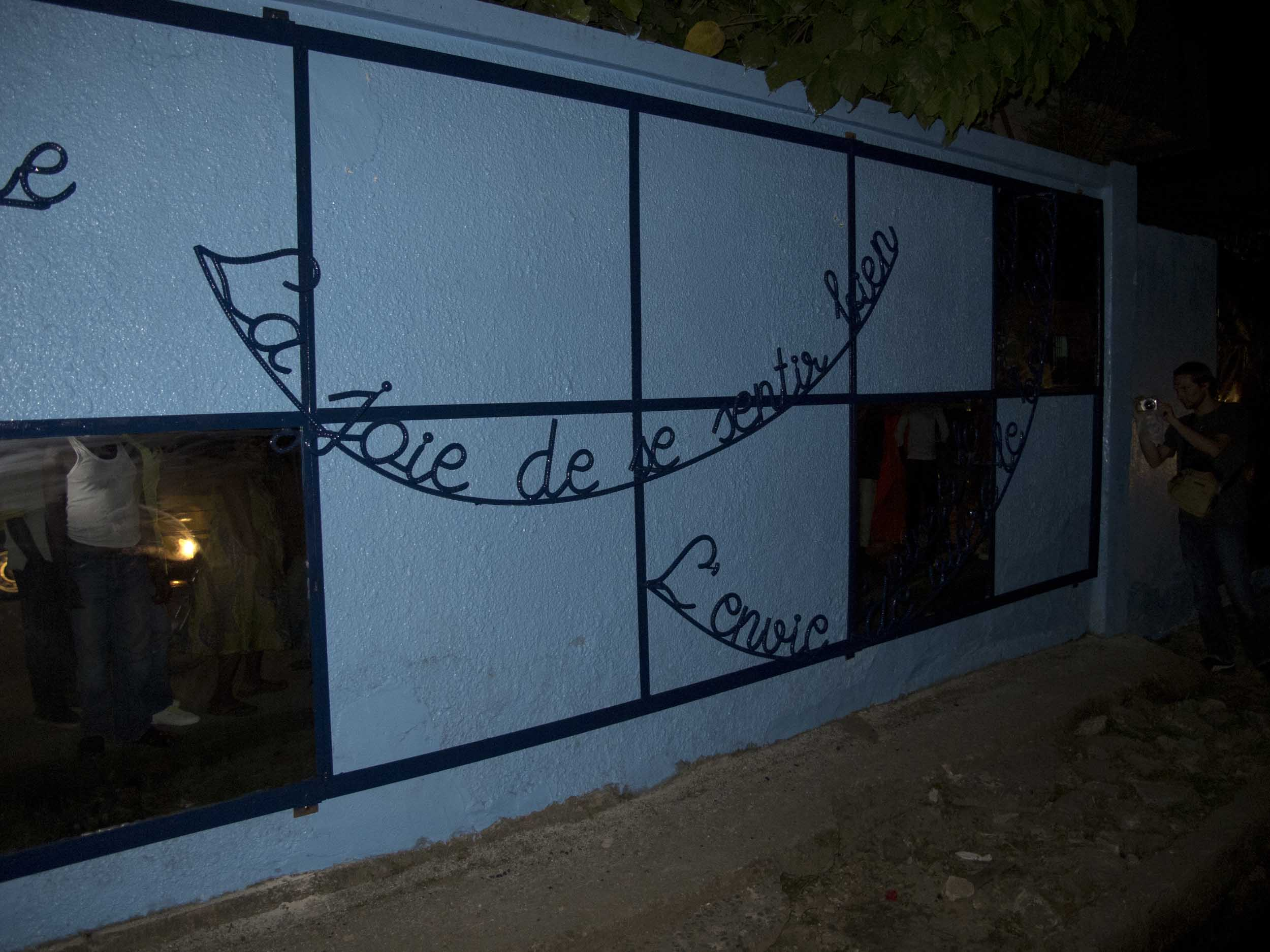

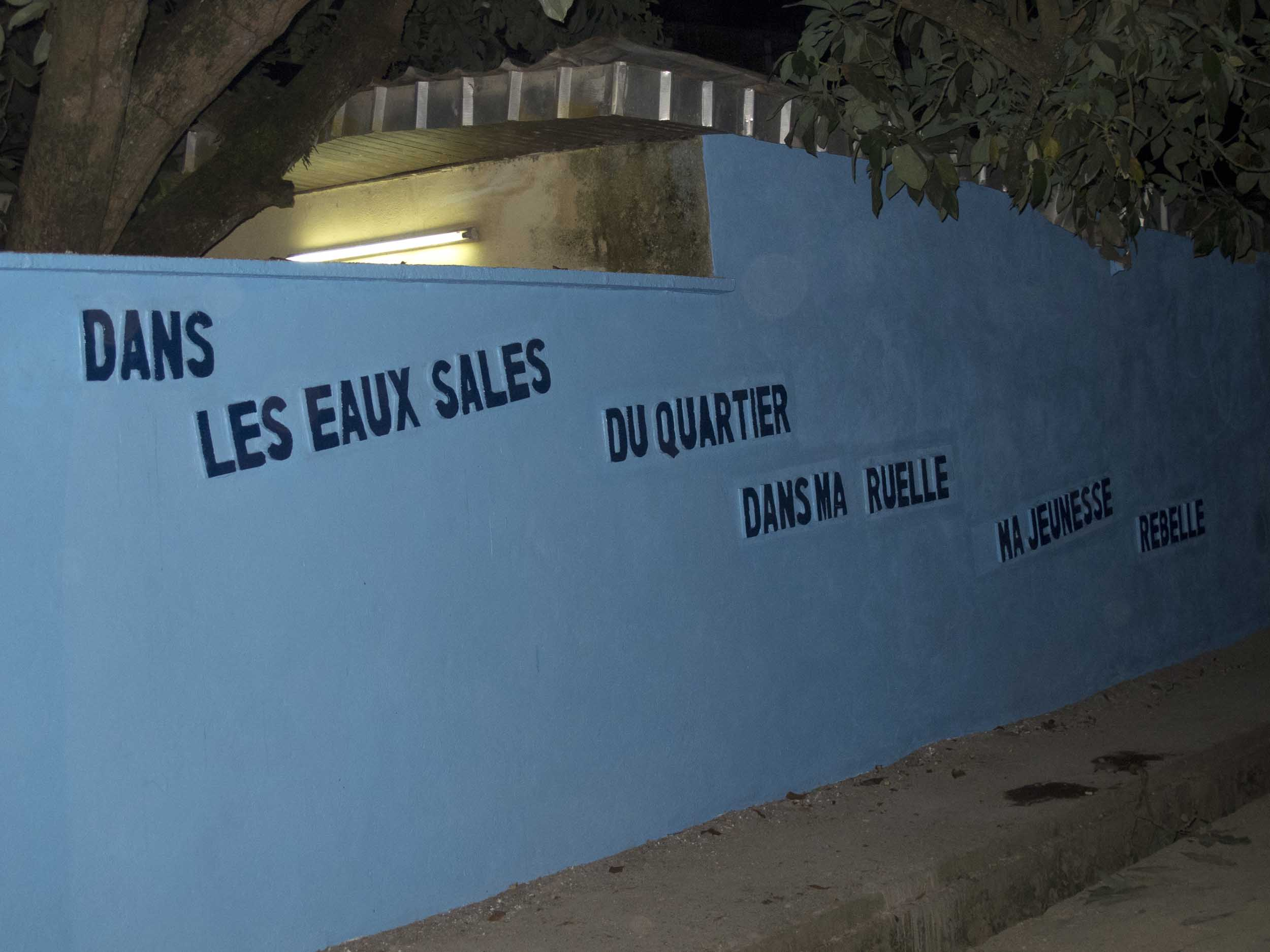

== See also ==
=== Bibliography ===
- Pensa, Iolanda (Ed.) 2017. Public Art in Africa. Art et transformations urbaines à Douala /// Art and Urban Transformations in Douala. Genève: Metis Presses. ISBN 978-2-94-0563-16-6
- Verschuren, K., X. Nibbeling and L. Grandin. (2012): Making Douala 2007–2103, Rotterdam, ICU art project
- Pucciarelli, M. (2015). «Culture and Safety in Douala: The Cases of New Bell and Bessengue », in Bonini Lessing, E. (ed.), Urban Safety and Security, Franco Angeli, pp- 69–79.
- Pucciarelli, M. and Cantoni, L. (2017). A Journey through Public Art in Douala: Framing the Identity of New Bell Neighbourhood. In Skinner, J. and Jolliffe, L. (eds.), Murals and Tourism: Heritage, Politics and Identity, pp. 147–164, Routledge
- Kouomou, A. and Youdjou, C. (2009): «Les mots écrits de New-Bell». In Liquid, No. 01, [janvier - Fevrier - Mars 2009]
- Kaze, R. and Tchakam, S. (2009): «Les artistes et l'état d'avancement des Liquid Projects». In Liquid No. 02, [avril - Mai - Juin 2009]
- Kaze, R. and Tchakam, S. (2009): «Les mots écrits de New Bell de Hervé Yamguen». In Liquid No. 03, [juillet - Août - Septembre 2009].
- Kaze, R. and Tchakam, S. (2009): «Avancement des liquid projects». In Liquid No. 04, [octobre - Novembre - Décembre]
- Kaze, R. and Tchakam, S. (2010): «Avancement des liquid projects. Les mots écrits de New Bell d'Hervé Yamguen». In Liquid No. 05, [janvier - Fevrier - Mars 2010]
- Van Der Lan, B. and Jenkins R.S. (eds) (2011). Douala: Intertwined Architectures, The Netherland: ArchiAfrica
- Van der Lans, B. (2013): «Best practices in culture-based urban development». In David Adjaye and Simon Njami (Eds) Visionary Africa: Art & architecture at work (III Ed.). Brussels, European Commission and Centre for Fine Arts (bozar).
- Schemmel, A. (2011) « Main discourses of the 2nd Salon Urbain de Douala (SUD) in Cameroon seen by an Indian runner duck». In Andrea Heister, Bonaventure Soh Bejeng Ndikung, (Re-) Mapping the field: a bird's eye view on discourses. Berlin Germany, Savvy. Art, Contemporary, Africa.
- Van der Lans, B. (2010): «Salon Urbaine de Douala 2010». In Architecture plus, [30 December 2010).
- Gourmelon, I. (2011): «Doual’Art 2010: Les parrains, les artistes et les autres…» In Les Instantanés Décales, (2 janvier 2011)
- Lettera 27, (2013): «Trasformazioni urbane: l’edizione 2013 di SUD, a Douala» In Lettera 27. (29 novembre 2013)
- Marta Pucciarelli (2014) Final Report. University of Applied Sciences and Arts of Southern Switzerland, Laboratory of visual culture.

=== Related articles ===
- List of public art in Douala
- Contemporary African art
