= Arbre à palabres (Bonambappe) =

Sculpture in Douala, Cameroon

L'arbre à palabres de Bonambappe
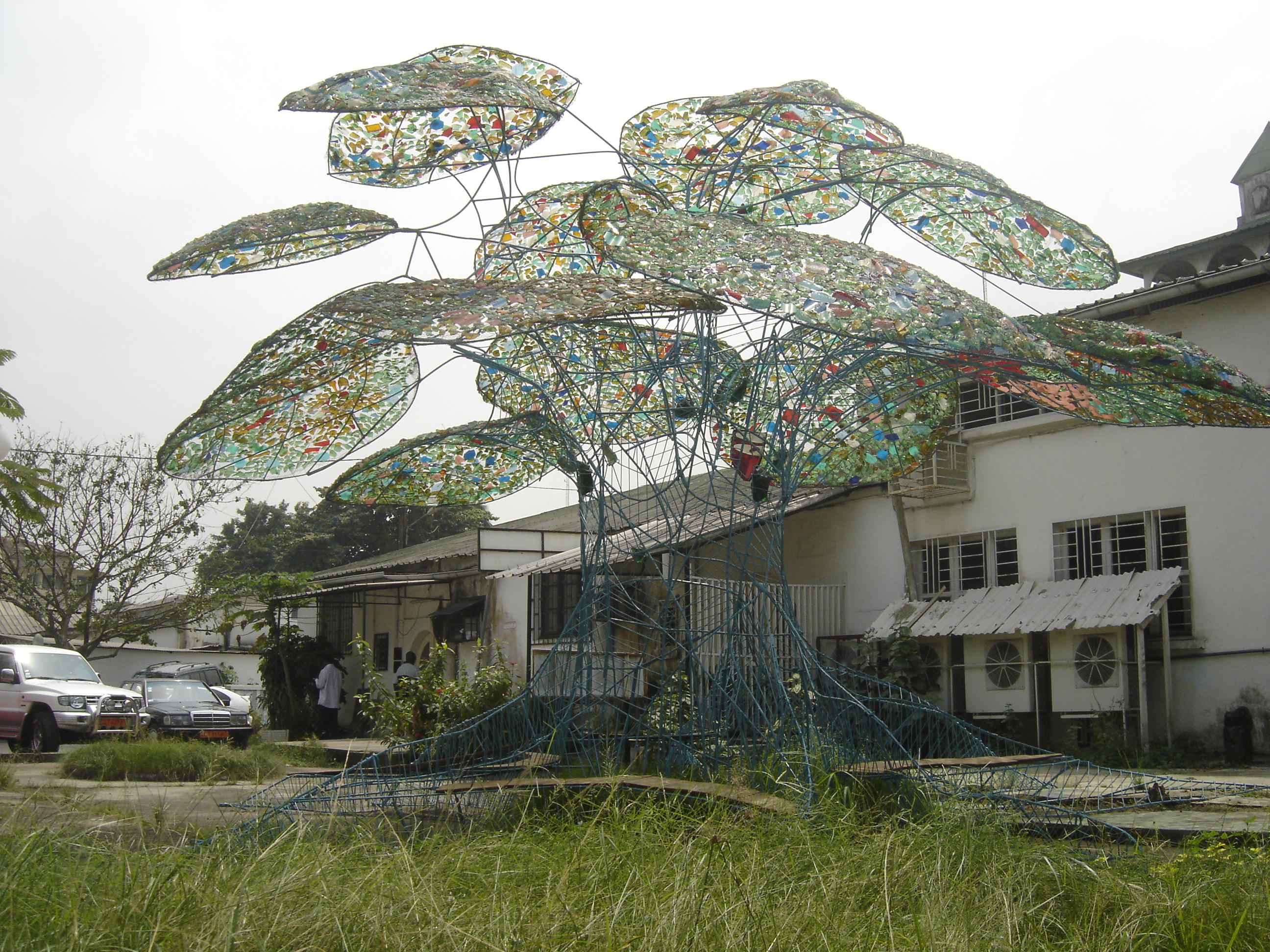
- Artist: Frédéric Keiff
- Year: 2007
- Type: Sculpture
- Dimensions: 5 m (200 in)
- Location: Jardin du tombeau des Rois Bell, Bonanjo Douala, Cameroon; 4.043768°N 9.687152°E
- Owner: Municipality of Douala

L'arbre à palabres is a permanent sculpture located in Douala (Cameroon). Created by the architecte Frédéric Keiff in 2007, it looks like a palaver tree, whose trunk and branches are made of painted iron rods, while attached fragments of colored glass represent leaves.

== The artwork ==
The Arbre à Palabre by Frédéric Keiff is a palaver tree whose trunk and branches are made of painted iron rods, while attached fragments of colored glass represent leaves. The installation is more than 5 meters tall with a canopy circumference of 7 meters, and it is equipped with wooden slabs embedded in the trunk, serving as benches. It is a passageway installation.

Initially conceived to substitute the former palaver tree of Douala, a huge baobab located in the district of Bonaberi, which fell down in 1993, the symbolic meaning of the installation forced some changes in the process. Traditionally, around the palaver tree, the chief of the village and the council members (the so-called notables) meet and seat in order to take the most important political and social decisions concerning the community, and it is there that tradition values were orally transmitted through generations.

This artwork became the subject of a long discussion between the chief of the village and the notables, who finally decided to forbid a foreign artist to place his artwork next to the rest of the former palaver tree. However, it was important that Keiff’s installation was positioned in a public space, easily accessible to inhabitants in order to guarantee that the contemporary palaver tree would keep on holding its symbolic function as a meeting, discussion, and sharing point. The superior chief of Douala, the Prince René Duala Manga Bell, offered one of his properties in Bonanjo for repositioning the Arbre à Palabre that was inaugurated for SUD 2007 and officially donated to the city of Douala.

The park where the Arbre à Palabre is located belongs to the Bell family, even if the installation itself is in the public domain. This area is surrounded by three historical monuments of Douala: to the North, the Vault of kings Bell, where today the same René Douala Manga Bell lies; to the South, the Espace doual'art (funding agency of the project) from which one can clearly see the Palace of the Kings Bell, commonly known as “La Pagode”, built in 1905 by German colonizers for the king Auguste Manga Ndoumbe; and, finally, to the West, the Old law court building.

== See also ==
=== Bibliography ===
- Pensa, Iolanda (Ed.) 2017. Public Art in Africa. Art et transformations urbaines à Douala /// Art and Urban Transformations in Douala. Genève: Metis Presses. ISBN 978-2-94-0563-16-6
- Verschuren, K., X. Nibbeling and L. Grandin. (2012): Making Douala 2007-2103, Rotterdam, ICU art project
- Keiff, F. (2007): Résidence à Douala. L’arbre à palabre. https://fredkeiff.blogspot.it (17 Oct - 20 Dec 2007)
- Lettera 27, (2013): «Trasformazioni urbane: l’edizione 2013 di SUD, a Douala» In Lettera 27. (29 Novembre 2013)
- Marta Pucciarelli (2014) Final Report. University of Applied Sciences and Arts of Southern Switzerland, Laboratory of visual culture.

=== Related articles ===
- List of public art in Douala
- Contemporary African art
