= Trinity Session =

Contemporary art production team

for the Cowboy Junkies 1988 album, see The Trinity Session.

The Trinity Session is a contemporary art production team directed by Stephen Hobbs and Marcus Neustetter.

The Trinity Session is defined by exchanges with their home-city Johannesburg (South Africa, in relation to Africa and similar developed / developing contexts. Key activities include temporary interventions and performances, in addition to producing and curating large scale public art programmes. Concerned with context specific technology applications and site-specific social practices, the artistic output of Hobbs/Neustetter, guided by issues of urban decay, xenophobia and public access, results in live actions and video documentation works.

Stephen Hobbs and Marcus Neustetter

Some of the most recent works of The Trinity Session include: Temporary But Permanent Projects a Survey exhibition at Museum of African Design, Johannesburg (2015) and at The Athenaeum in Port Elizabeth (South Africa, 2014); Renaming the City, commissioned artwork for the Ars Electronica Festival in Linz (Austria, 2015); Exquisite Corpse, a video performance presented at the Subtle Tech festival in Toronto (Canada, 2014); Platform 1, a public intervention with the Swallows Foundation, GIFT Festival in Gateshead (United Kingdom, 2013); Bessengue B’etoukoa a public intervention in Douala commissioned for Across the board: Public Space/ Public Sphere curated by Elvira Dyangani Ose (Tate Modern, London), for the SUD – Salon Urbain de Douala 2013 (Cameroon); ATAYA, a public performance France/South Africa Cultural Seasons in St Ouen and Paris (France, 2013); Fluid Stop, a site-specific installation and public projection at Greenhouse, St Etienne (France).

== Bibliography ==
- Andrew Lamprecht, The Trinity Session in Sophie Perryer, 10 years 100 artists: art in a democratic South Africa, Struik, 2004, p. 374
- Penny Siopis, The Space Between in "Art South Africa", vol 1, n. 3, Autumn 2003.
- Mary Stuart, Bursting with Ideas for Arc in "The Sunday Independent, 04/07/2004.
- Njami, Simon. Africa Remix: Contemporary Art of a Continent. Jacana Media, 2007, p. 247.
- Cremona, Vicki Ann, Rikard Hoogland, Gay Morris, and Willmar Sauter. Playing Culture:
- Conventions and Extensions of Performance. Rodopi, 2014, p. 101.
- The South African Art Information Directory: The SAAID Art Directory. Global Art Information, 2010, p. 15
- Hopkins, D., and K. Solga. Performance and the Global City. Springer, 2013.
- Lossau, Julia, and Quentin Stevens. The Uses of Art in Public Space. Routledge, 2014. P. 118
- Pensa, Iolanda (Ed.) 2017. Public Art in Africa. Art et transformations urbaines à Douala /// Art and Urban Transformations in Douala. Genève: Metis Presses. ISBN 978-2-94-0563-16-6

=== Related articles ===
- List of public art in Douala
