= Former palace of Justice of Douala =

Palace of Justice of Douala
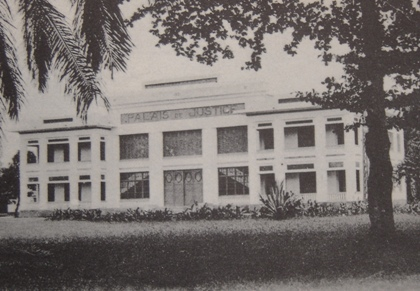
- Interactive map of the Palace of Justice of Douala area

General information
- Type: Palace of justice, law court
- Location: Douala, Cameroon
- Coordinates: 4.04335°N 9.68648°E
- Current tenants: Court of Appeal of the Littoral
- Construction started: 1930
- Completed: 1931
- Renovated: 2000
- Owner: Department of Justice, government of Cameroon

The former Palace of Justice of Douala situated in Douala is a building originally constructed between 1930-31 under the French Mandate.

In 2000 the building was extended with two additional wings in a project initiated by the Department of Justice.

== History ==
Under the German administration (1884-1914), three judiciary bodies were created: a landlords’ court, a tribes’ court and an arbitration court. The Douala landlords were subjected to a patent in order to exercise as customary judges, and gained some income from it. Their competence to fine and jail was restricted to 100 marks and six months. Beyond these figures and up to the death penalty, only the German civil laws had force of law. In parallel, a council of notables collaborated with the German governor on the questions of social organization.

During the Franco-British condominium (1916-1919), and until the granting of the Mandate by the Company of the Nations (1922), the French administration works within the legal framework left by the Germans and preserves the same indigenous jurisdictions.

Under the French Mandate, as of the construction of the law courts, in 1930, these jurisdictions are replaced by courts of 1st and 2nd degree. This reorganization removes the consequent material advantages that the Douala landlords’ possessed. This displeases them immensely. They made their dissatisfaction heard, maintaining clandestine courts, and even restore the pre-colonial traditional authorities.

Until 1941, the French administration will preserve the Council of notable, while applying the code of the indigénat, heir to the Code Noir established by Louis XIV at the beginning of the 18th century. This legal situation will end in Cameroon only after the French Liberation and the Conference of Brazzaville in 1944.

Today this building shelters the Court of Appeal of the Littoral.

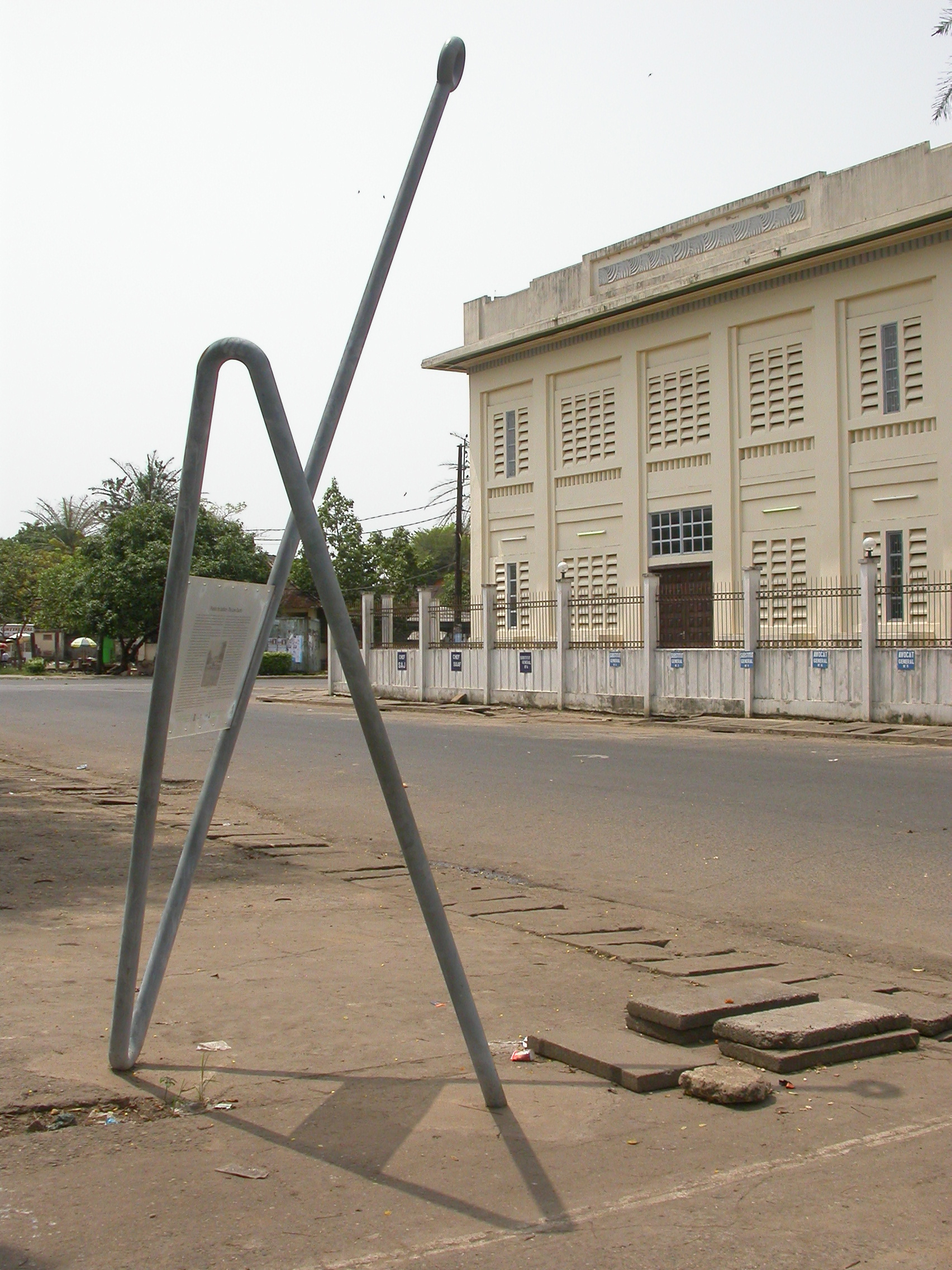
The Former Palace of Justice with the urban sign Douala Ville d'art et d'histoire

In 2006 the building is highlighted by an urban sign produced by doual'art and designed by Sandrine Dole; the sign presents an historical image of the building and a description of its history.

== Related articles ==
- List of public art in Douala
