= Hervé Yamguen =

Cameroonian painter and sculptor (born 1971)

Hervé Yanguem
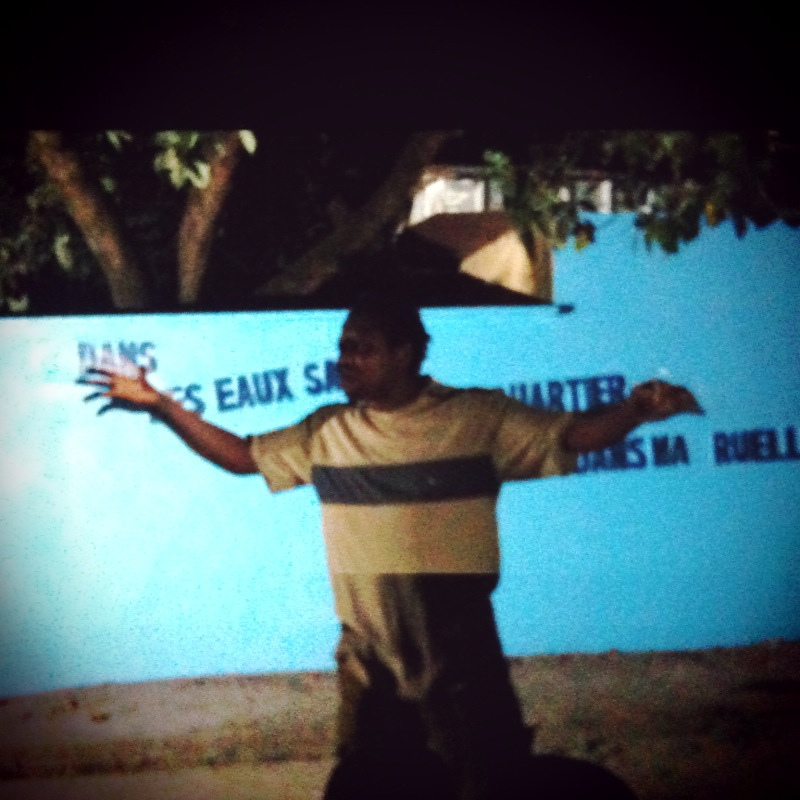
- Hervé Yanguen during a performance, Douala, 2010
- Born: June 17, 1971 (51); Douala, Cameroon
- Education: Ecole Superiore des Arts Decoratifs in Strasburg
- Known for: Painting, Sculpture
- Notable work: Le temps de la saison verte (1998),

Hervé Yamguen (born 1971 in Douala) is a Cameroonian painter and sculptor working in New Bell. A self-taught artist, he launched himself in painting, sculpture and he discovered a passion for the writing which enables him to wonder about its daily live. He currently works on plays.

== Works ==
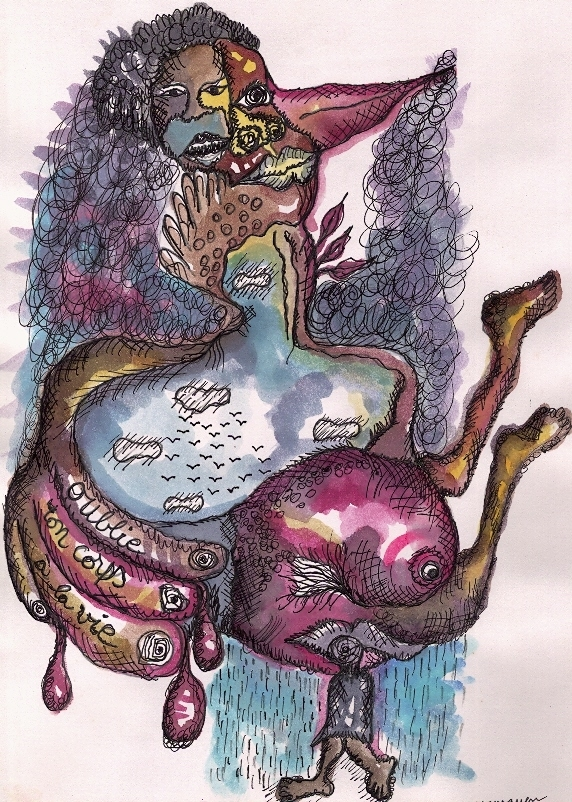
Hervé Yamguen,oublie ton corps à la vie, 2007

Yamguen was born into a family that valued tradition, and they initially refused to accept his choice to become an artist. From childhood, he was attracted to the way in which artists interpreted their own realities in their works, and has said that "being an artist is a way of existing in the world and is closely associated with spirituality". He started painting at the age of 17 and became a professional artist by the late 1980s after refusing to enter the monastery. Afterwards, his family supported his artistic pursuits. Self-taught, he refined his techniques by reading about art history, which led him to develop his singular vision of art. Subsequently, he received a year of training (2000-2001) at École des Arts Décoratifs (ESAD) in Strasbourg, France. He has done many study and production residencies in Cameroon and abroad.

Yamguen is also known for his writings about the visual arts (drawing, painting, sculpture), as well as his poetry. He has made a few forays into photography, performance, installation and has regularly done stage designs for the theater. The themes present in his work are eroticism, the questioning of the human-plant-animal and bird. Through these themes, he tells the story of humans and invites one to look at life with wonder; the small details of daily life that represent the beauty of the world and make life more pleasurable. Yamguen is inspired by the work (technical, power of the work, style) of several writers and artists who work on wonder, whimsy and imagination: Matisse, Picasso, Henri Michaux, and the Surrealist poets. The artist wants to invite the public to reflect on his humanity in order to become better. According to him, the reception of his work is not enthusiastic: either it is too risqué or inaccessible.

Hervé Yamguen is one of the members of the Cercle Kapsiki, a collective consisting of Yamguen and several other Cameroonian artists. As a member of the Cercle, he took part in Scénographies Urbaines, (Urban Scenographies) in January 2003, an event and artist residency organized by the collective. The project was based out of the New Bell neighborhood of Douala where Yanguen resides, and aimed to help artists express themselves and engage in an exchange with the inhabitants of the district. The workshop also involved Cercle Kapsiki (Hervé Youmbi, Hervé Yamguen, Blaise Bang, Salifou Lindou, Jules Wokam) collaborating with the Scur' k collective (J-C Lanquetin, François Duconseille) inviting other artists from Cameroon, France, Democratic Republic of the Congo and Lebanon, to come together and share details of their lives with the district's population.

In 2003, Yamguen exhibited work at the Galerie Mam Art Contemporain within the framework of the project Pièce Unique, initiated by the French Cultural Center of Douala. He also published a long poem Le temps de la saison verte (The time of the green season), in 1998. A new book is published by the French Cultural Center of Douala.

Recently, he was inducted as a dignitary in the village of his father (Bandja-Balassie in the upper Nkam), where he reconnects with the codes of the rituals and customs while maintaining his posture of contemporary artist.

His work has been shown in various countries around the world. In France and Germany repeatedly and recently in Côte d'Ivoire and Senegal between 2015 and 2016. Beside his work as a creative, Yamguen has served other functions in the art world. In 2005 and 2006, he taught fine arts in Douala at the secondary level. He was the artistic director of the three editions (2011, 2012 and 2013) of the Marché des Arts Plastiques de Bali.

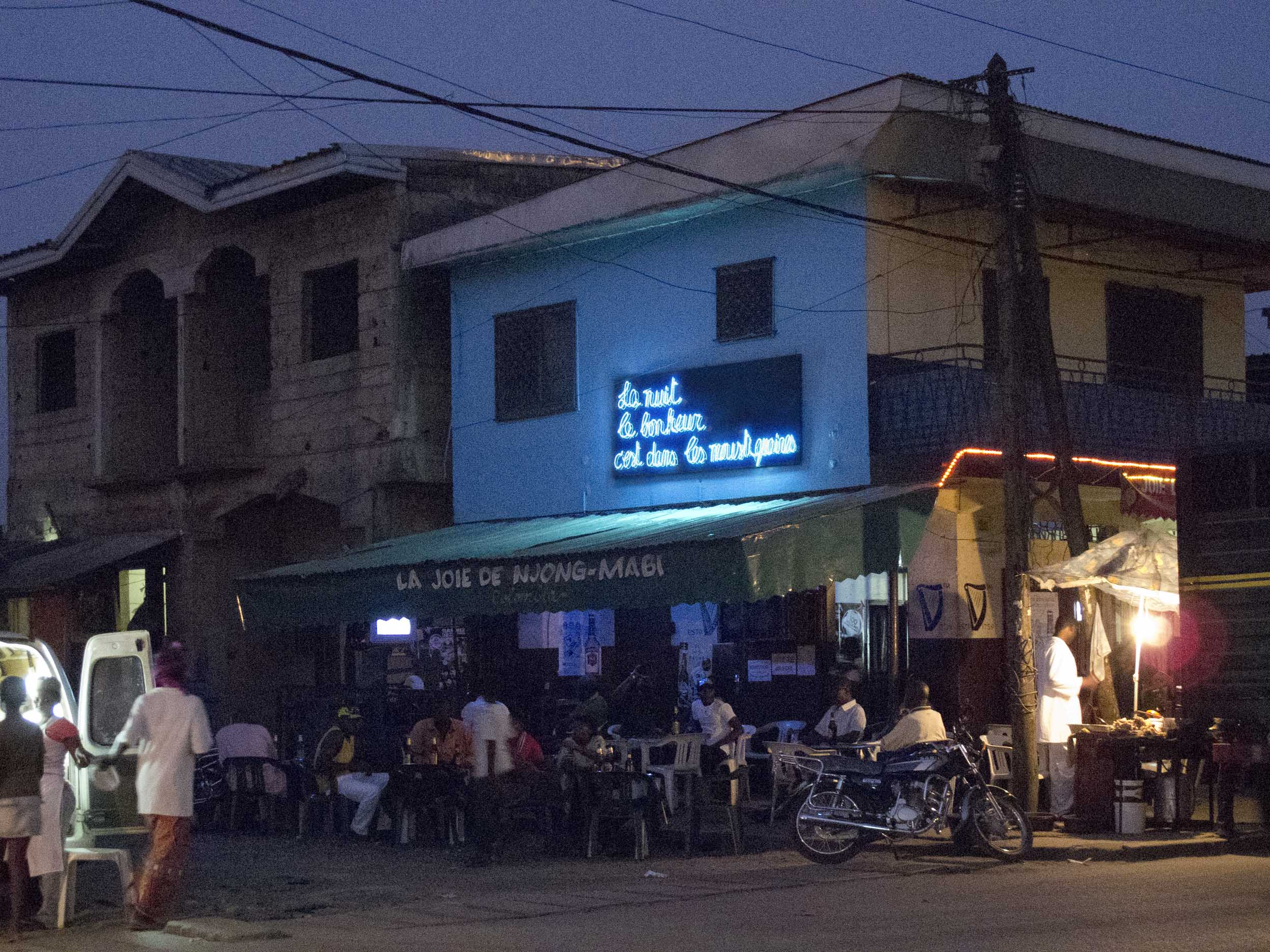
Néons d’Amour, 2007

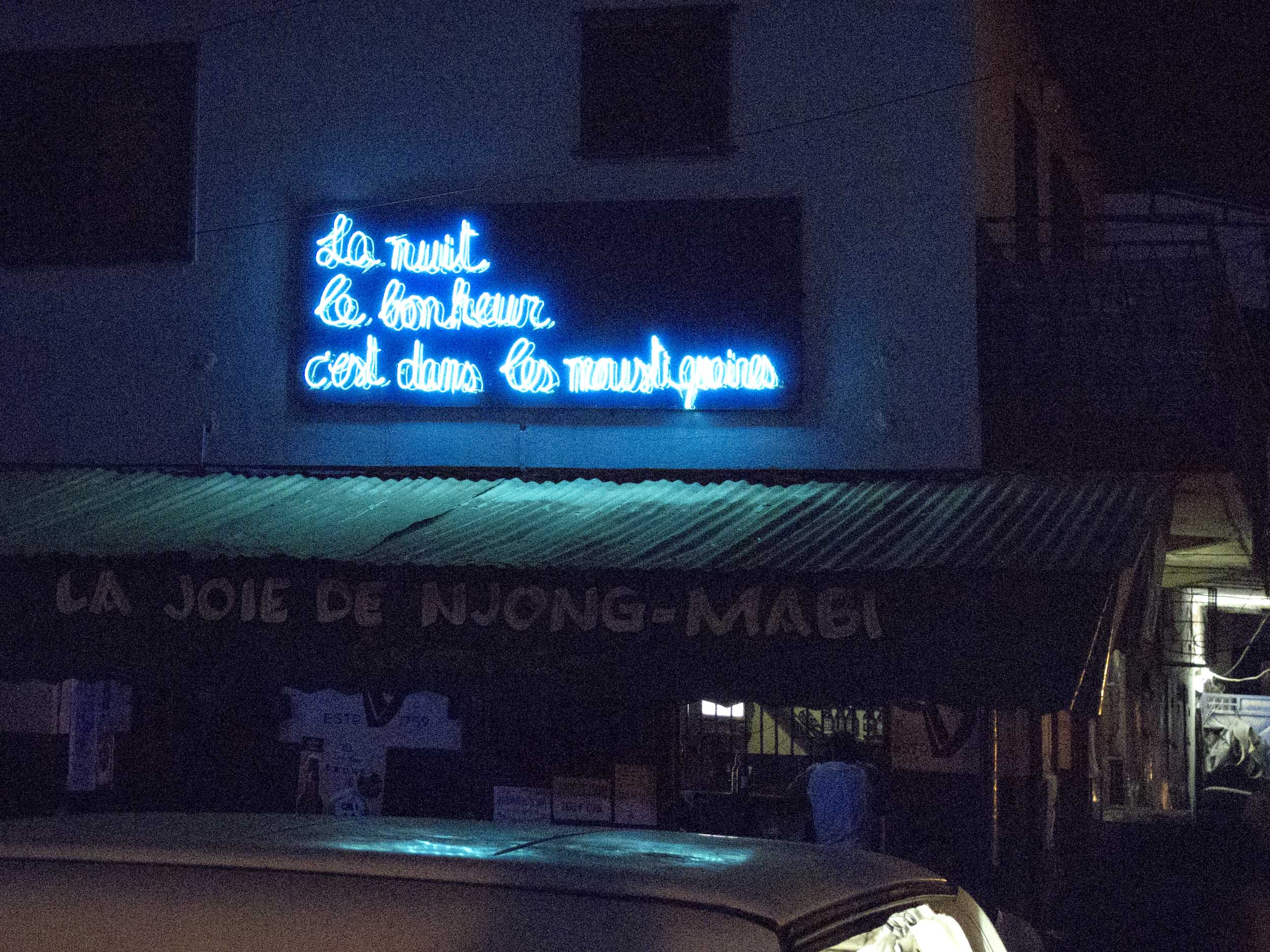

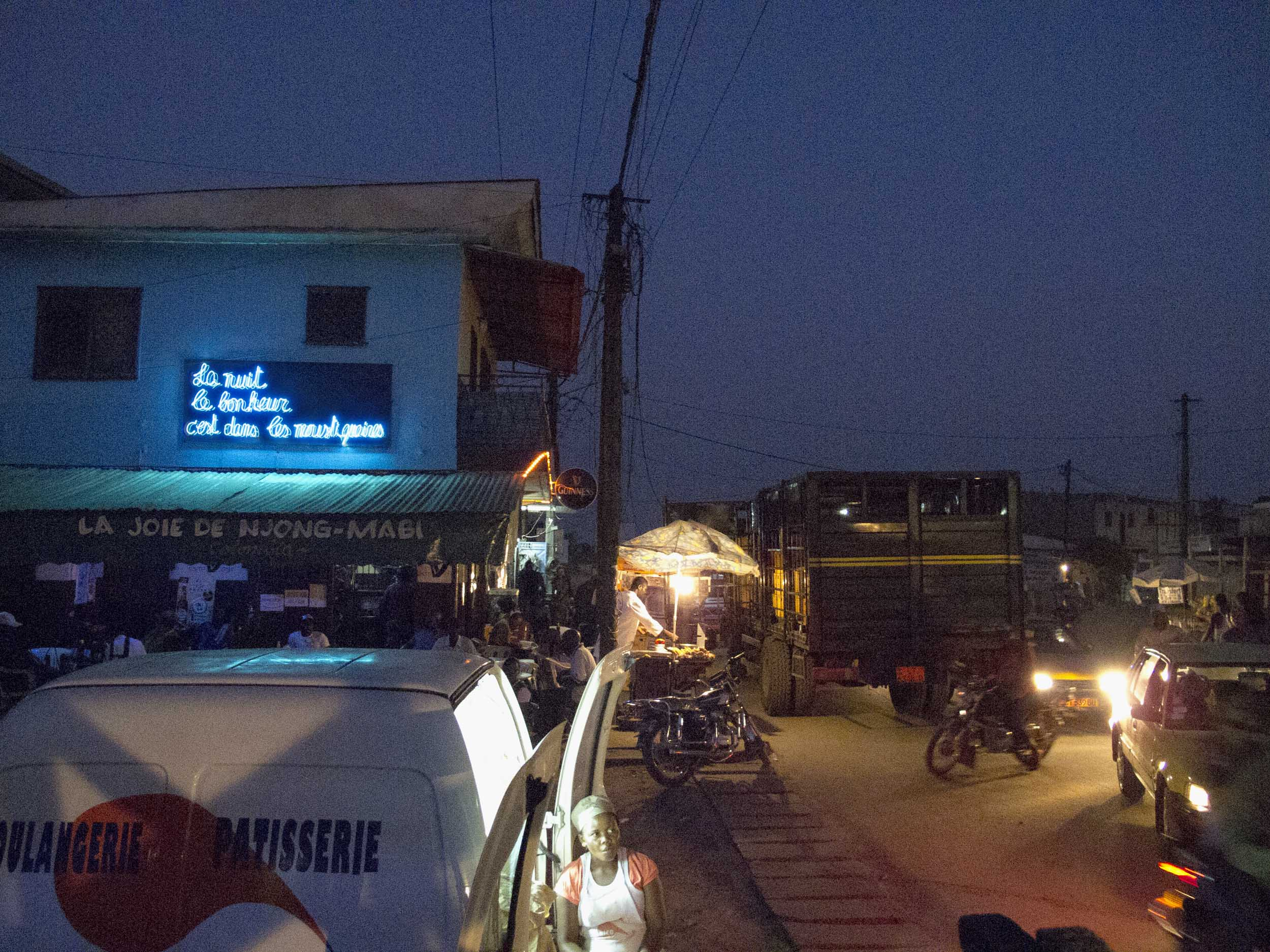

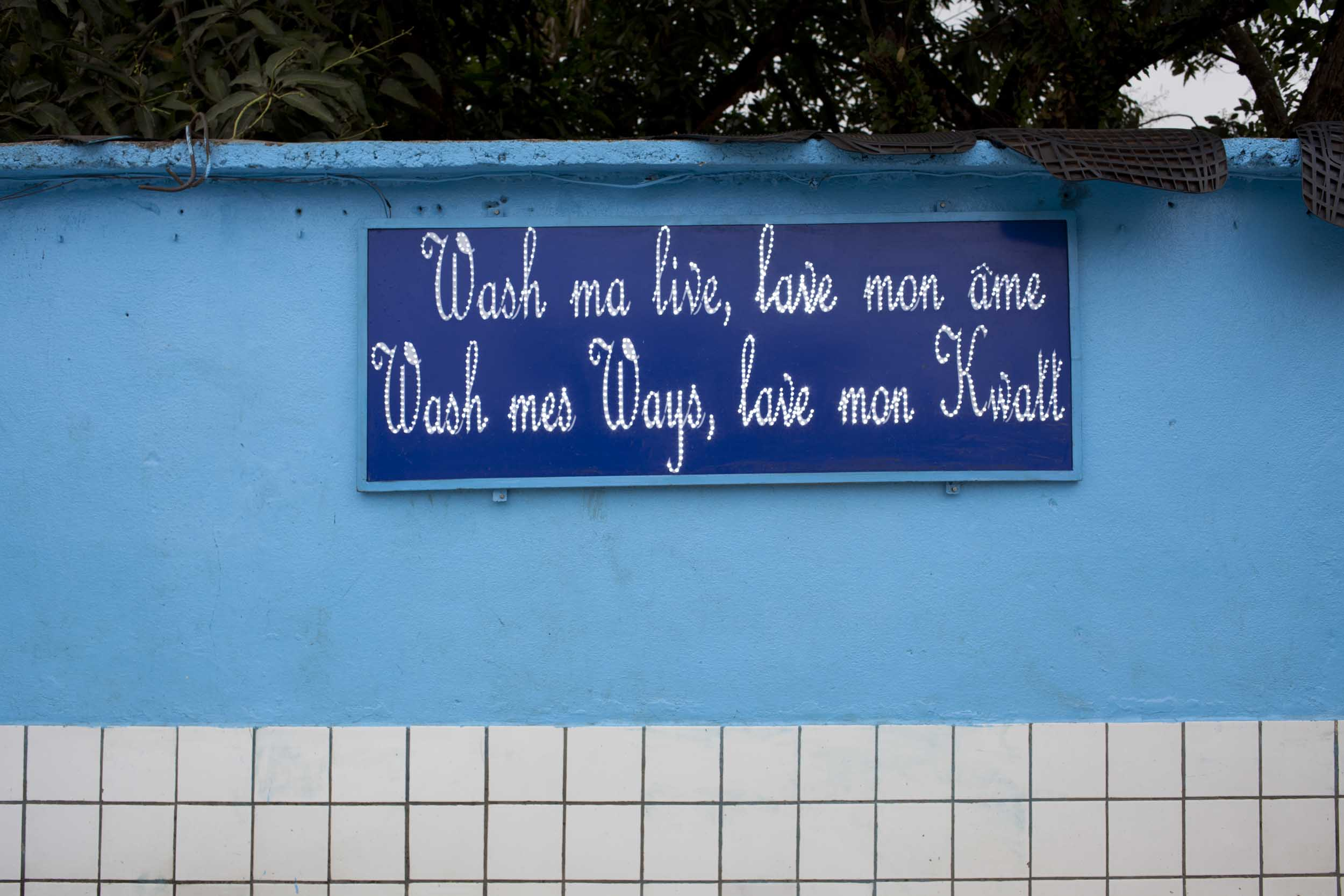
Les mots écrits de New-Bell, 2010

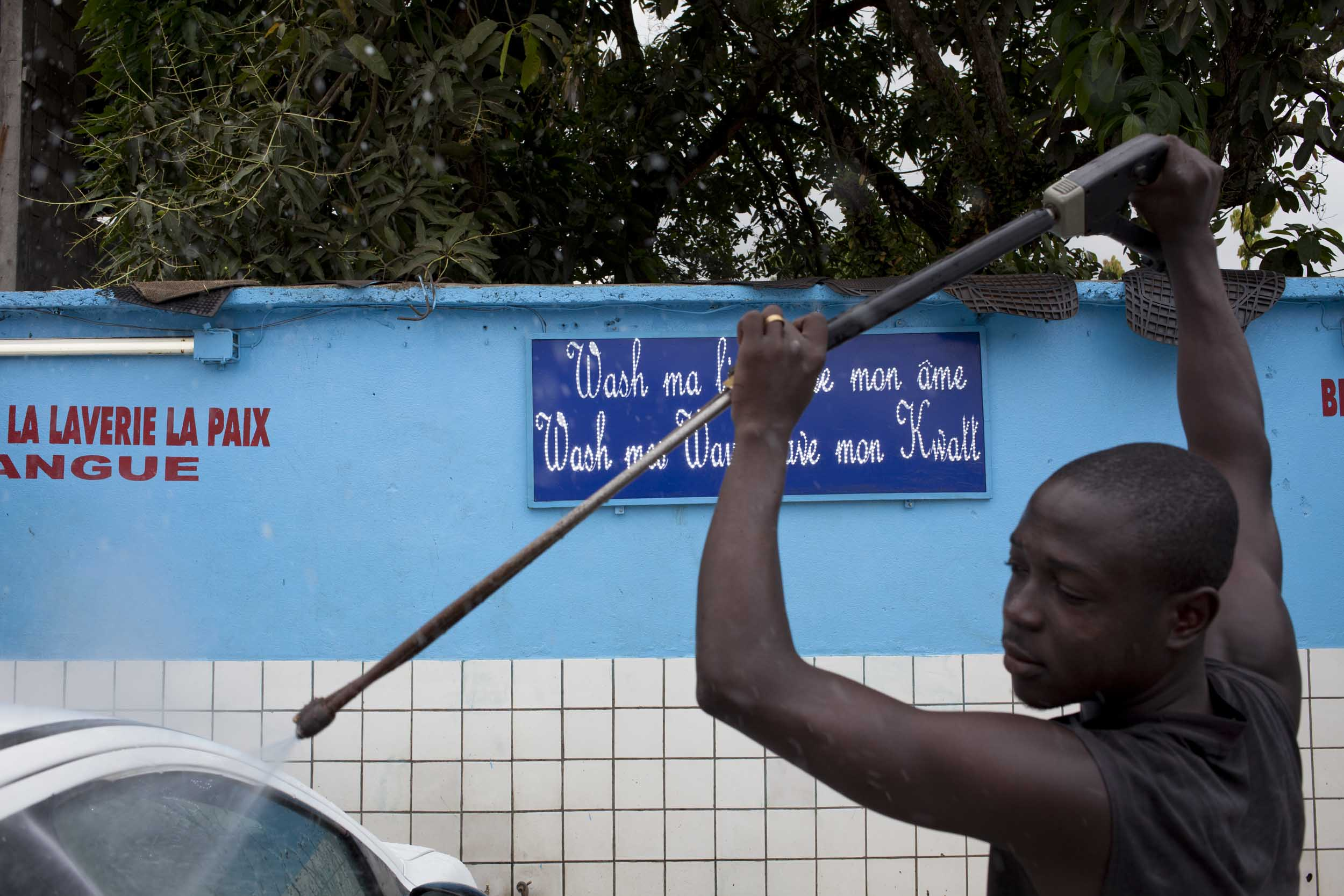

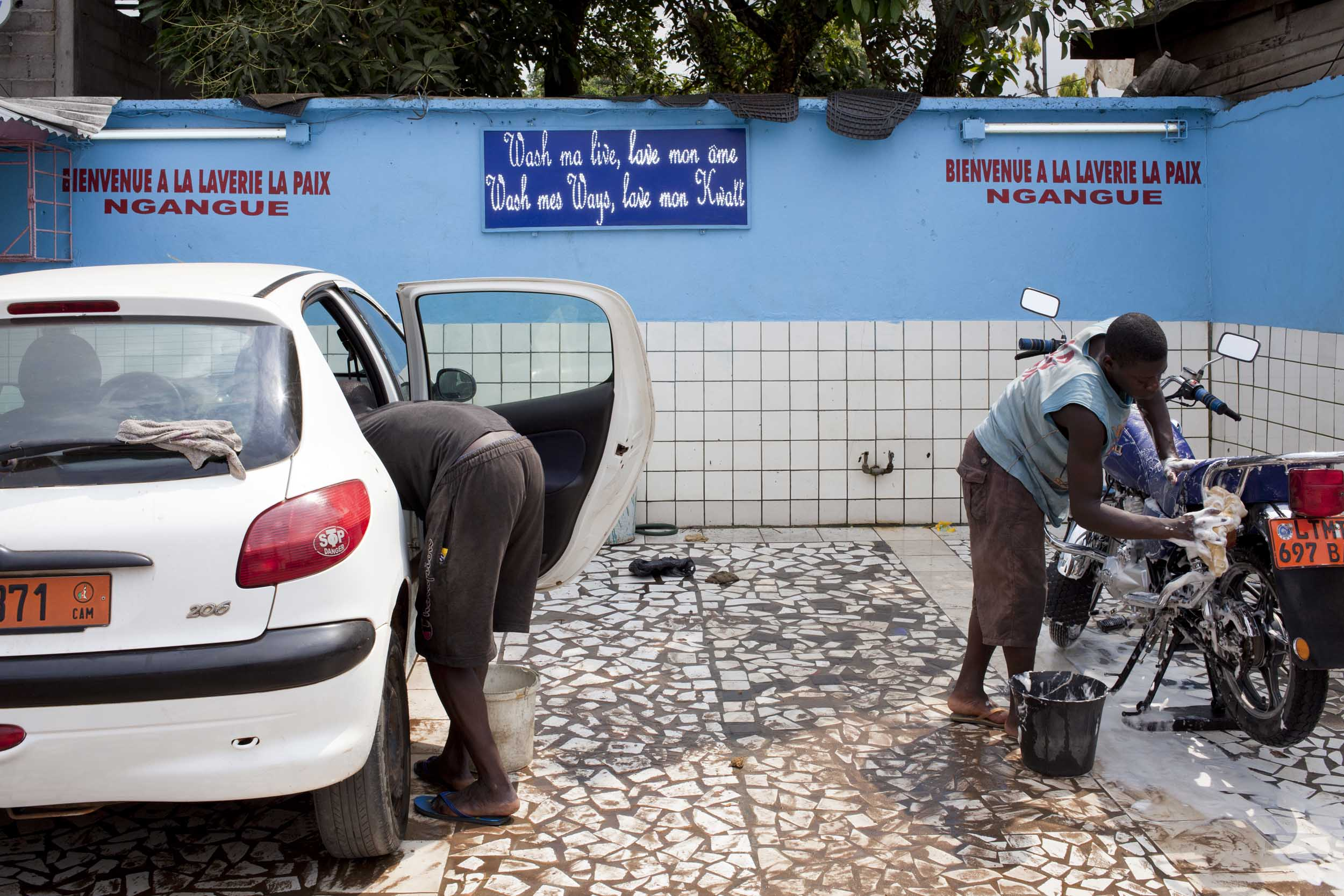

== Publications ==
- Le Temps de la saison verte, poetry, Les Solitaires intempestifs, 1998
- La Nuit cristalline, livre objet, 12 copies, poetry, 2000
- Entre brune et cratère, livre objet, 10 copies with sérigraphies, poetry, 2000
- Le déluge en soi n'est jamais trop loin, poetry, drawings, CCF Blaise Cendrars, Cameroon, March 2005
- Sous les airs du Wouri, Pas de quartier- Brigade d'intervention poétique, édition du CCF Blaise Cendrars, 2006
- Respiration in "Interdit de laver sa mobylette", poetry, collaborative work, illustrations by Hervé Yamguen, éditions Opoto, 2007
- Hervé Yameguen in carnet de la création, éditions de l’œil, 2011
- Les oiseaux, dessins et sculptures, doual’art, 2015

== See also ==
- List of public art in Douala
