= Frédéric Keiff =

French architect and artist

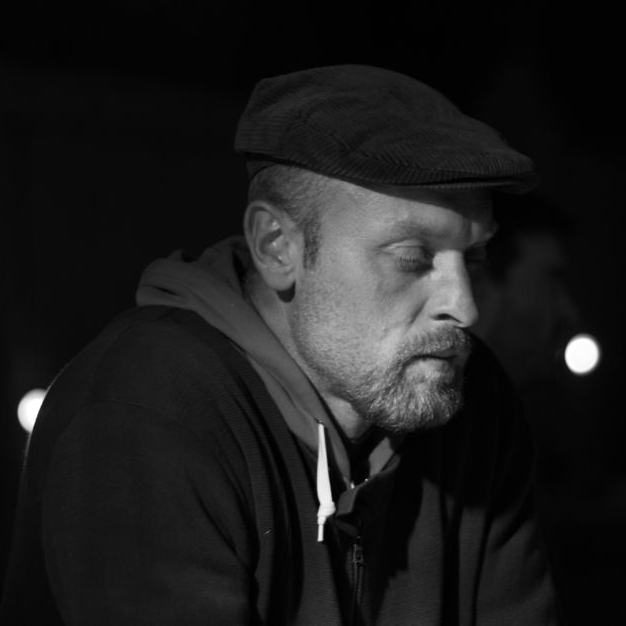
- Frédéric Keiff in 2014
- Born: 1973 (age 52–53); Metz, France

Frédéric Keiff (born 1973) is a French architect and artist. He lives and works in Strasbourg, France.

== Biography ==
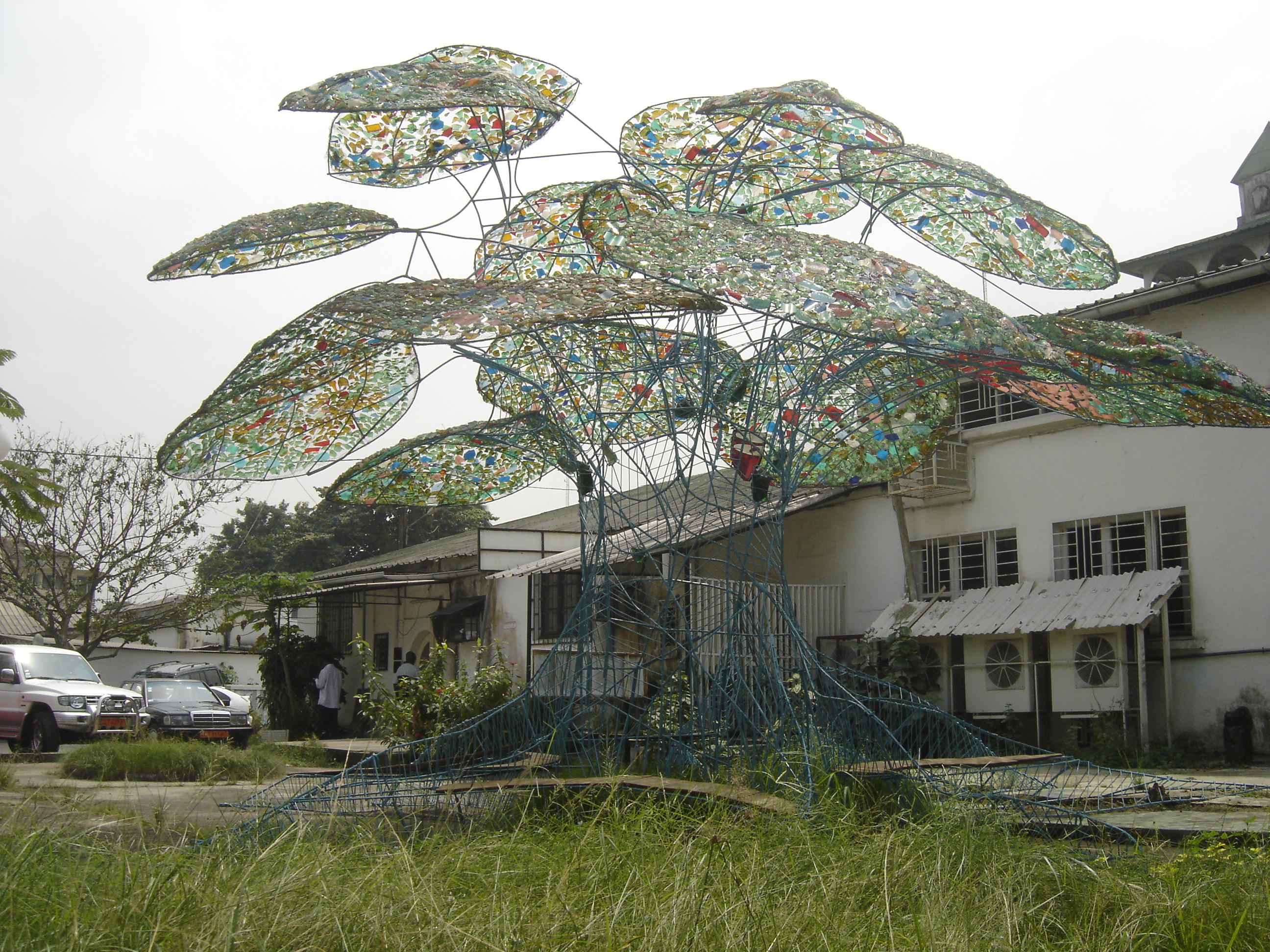
L'Arbre à palabres in Douala, Cameroon

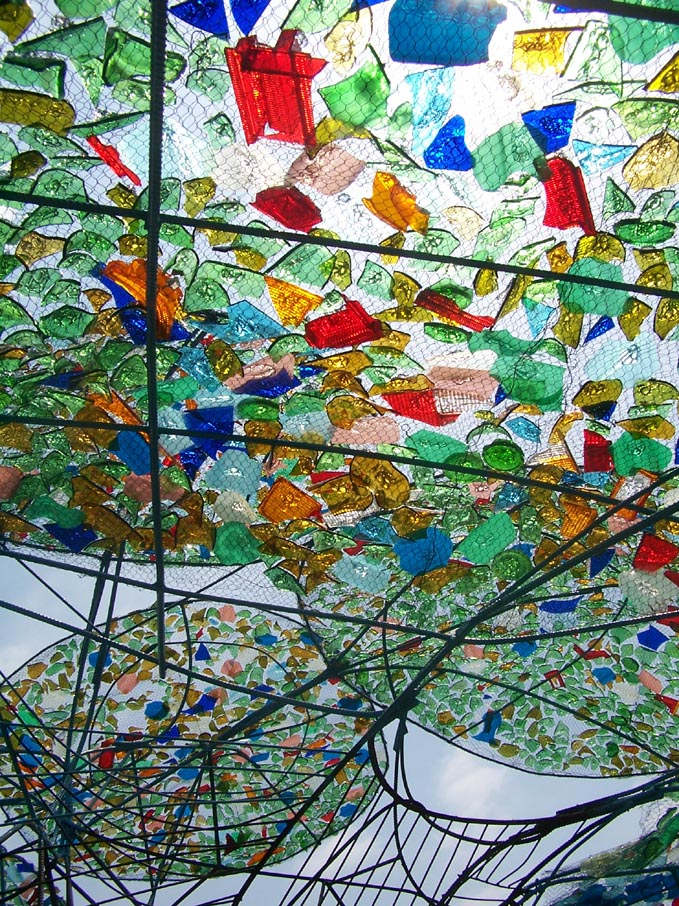
L'Arbre à palabres, detail

Frédéric Keiff was born in 1973 in Metz. He is a postgraduate at the Faculty of Arts of Strasbourg in 2000, graduated in architecture at the ENSAS of Strasbourg in 2001. Since then, he devoted himself to ar(t)chitectural research, in-between urban self-built collective experiments, and personal plastic research. In 2001 he founded the collective 3RS Charles Altorffer in Strasbourg. He is an active member of the first hour in the EXYZT group formed in 2003 in Paris.

After graduation in 2001, he started a reflection on the human body as a unit of architecture, referring to Vitruvius, Leonardo da Vinci, Le Corbusier, to determine the archetype to place at the heart of contemporary architecture. But rather than marrying an ideal, a perfect modular, his quest is more about the definition of a variable geometry model, incorporating therein the particulars and deformities of all. He questions the differences that make humanity what it is, i.e. a set of non-interchangeable singularities. In recent years, light has taken a special place in his artistic production with the construction of special windows, such as recovering debris of glass and assembling them on flexible silicone structures.

In 2006, he worked on Vitraux Vivo at Mozet, Belgium. In 2007, in residence in Douala, he offers the city the work Arbre à palabres (Palaver Tree). In 2011 he participated in the group exhibition A view of urbanity organized by the General Council of 67 in Strasbourg (France). In 2013 he did the performance the Surviving Pablo at La Semencerie in Strasbourg (France) and, in the same year, he offered the city of Le Havre (France) the work Arbōat, a monumental sculpture created in collaboration with Coal. Recently, he worked on The Feasting Mouth (2014), a monumental sculpture project carried out with the Tate Modern of London, United Kingdom, as well as the collective exhibition Ateliers Nomades, Depo2015 in the Cultural Capital of 2015, Plzeň (Czech Republic).

== Artworks ==
- OOT (One of Them), 2009
- L'Arbre à palabres, Douala, 2007
- Vitraux in Vivo, Mozet, Belgique 2006

== Expositions ==
- Le Forum, Nuit Blanche de l'Art Contemporain de Metz avec le collectif 3rs, 2008
- Southwark Lido, Biennale d'architecture de Londres avec le collectif exyzt, 2008
- Hotel Ephémère des Trinitaires, rencontres de la FRAAP à Metz avec le collectif 3rs, mai 2008
- L'Arbres à Palabres, dans le cadre du Salon Urbain de Douala (SUD) organisé par Doual'art, 2007
- Participation au projet Labichampi : construction d'une structure pour une reconversion économique et sociale d'une ruine en exploitation en Lettonie, 2007
- Biennale de Venise, Projet collectif EXYZT, pavillon français, 2006
- Exposition aux Ateliers Ouverts à Strasbourg, 2006
- Exposition de sculpture et vitraux au salon de Printemps à Strasbourg, 2006

== Bibliography ==
- At Work (2007). L'arbre à palabres. http://www.at-work.org/fr/carnet/frederic-keiff-carnet/
- Pensa, Iolanda (Ed.) 2017. Public Art in Africa. Art et transformations urbaines à Douala /// Art and Urban Transformations in Douala. Genève: Metis Presses. ISBN 978-2-94-0563-16-6

== See also ==
- List of public art in Douala
