= List of public art in Douala =

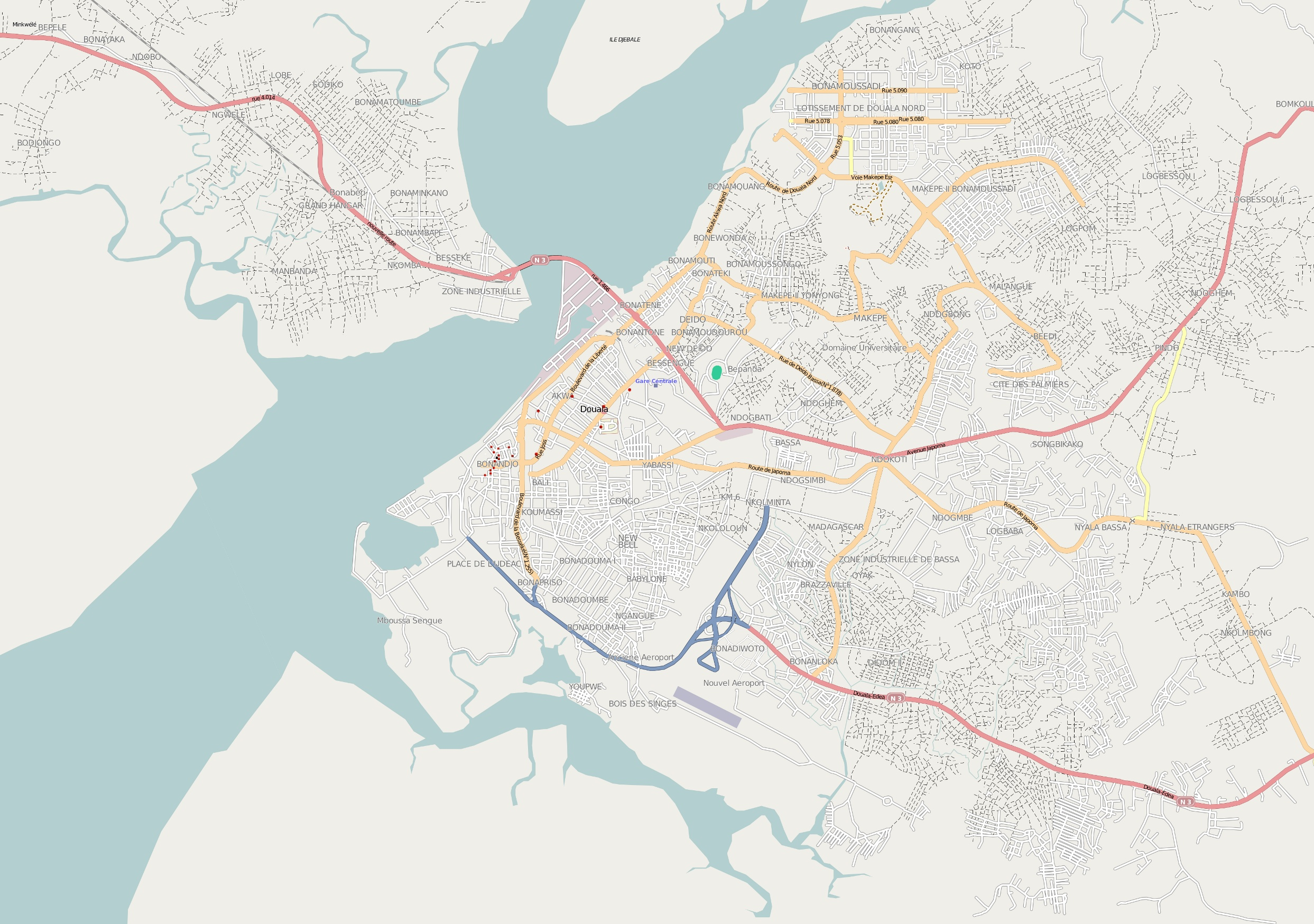
Public art in Douala.

This is a list of public art in Douala (second largest city in Cameroon ), within the city and its adjacent municipalities, including statues, sculptures, murals and other significant artworks located outside in public view.

== Sites ==
=== Permanent artwork ===
Image	Title / subject	Location and coordinates	Date	Artist / designer	Type	Material	Dimensions	Designation	Owner / administrator	Notes
	Art venture triptych	Bonanjo 4.043537°N 9.687509°E	1992	Joël Mpah Dooh et Etienne Delacroix	Permanent murals.	Wall painting.	2,5 meters	Three plexiglass panels triptychs	Public art work Sponsored by doual'art and donated to the Communauté Urbaine de Douala (owner).	These plexiglass panels triptychs are the first public artworks offered to the city by the association doual'art in 1993, and produced with the support of the French Cultural Centre in Douala and Graphics System, Douala. They are the result of the creative digital workshop "Artventure, l’art et l’informatique s’affichent en ville", run by the Belgian artist Etienne Delacroix in Douala in 1992. The young Mony, and the artists Komégné Koko and Joel Mpah Dooh had benefited from this creative workshop, which produced a total of four plexiglass panels triptychs. Two triptychs, those by Mony and Koko Komégné, that were installed at the 4th Rond point (roundabout) in Akwa, have been degraded by advertisers and have now disappeared. The other panels are still visible rue du Tribunal, in Bonanjo.
	La Nouvelle Liberté	Deïdo 4.064222°N 9.706936°E	1996	Joseph-Francis Sumégné	Permanent monumental sculpture.	Recycled material	High: 12m; wingspan: 5m	Monumental sculpture for a main roundabout in Douala	Sponsored by doual'art and donated to the Communauté Urbaine de Douala (owner).	The work was restored in 2007 and presented during the SUD Salon Urbain de Douala 2007. The sculpture is considered an icon on the city.
	La Borne Fontaine	Bessengue Akwa 4.054601°N 9.707102°E	2003	Danièle Diwouta-Kotto	Public art and infrastructure		3x4x6 meters	A permanent fountain designed as a development/architectural project	Sponsored by doual'art and donated to the Communauté Urbaine de Douala (owner).	The work was presented during the SUD Salon Urbain de Douala 2007.
	AIDS prevention	Bonabéri De 4.084159°N 9.667257°E à 4.081976°N 9.668652°E	2005	Dodji Efoui, Hervé Youmbi and students of the bilingual school of Bonaberie.	Permanent murals.	Wall paint.			owner = Sponsored by Doual'art and donated to the Communauté Urbaine de Douala (owner).	
	La Passerelle	Bessengue Akwa 4.05532°N 9.707129°E	2005	Alioum Moussa	Permanent public art and infrastructure	wood and iron	1,26 × 4,92 × meters	A permanent bridge designed as a development/architectural project	Sponsored by doual'art[1] and donated to the Communauté Urbaine de Douala (owner). Development Community of Bessengué (administrator)	The work was presented during the SUD Salon Urbain de Douala 2007.
	Les Arches du Temps – Douala Ville d'Art et d'Histoire	Nearby 18 historical monuments in Bonanjo and Akwa	2006	Sandrine Dole	urban design			Permanent – urban design associated to cultural and historical landmark/monument.	Communauté Urbaine de Douala.	Inauguration: SUD Salon Urbain de Douala 2010
	Sud Obelisk	Bonanjo 4.043187°N 9.687281°E	2007	Faouzi Laatiris	Permanent pyramidal sculpture	Materials of the structure: reinforced concrete; surface Materials: black marble; lettering: engraving and gilding with fine gold; pyramidion: gold brass.	height: 875 cm; base dimensions: 100 x 100 cm; dimensions at the top: 20 x 20 cm.	Commemorative monument commissioned in the frame of SUD Salon Urbain de Douala.	Sponsored by Doual'art and donated to the Communauté Urbaine de Douala (owner).	The work was presented during the SUD Salon Urbain de Douala 2007.
	Njé Mo Yé	Nkololoun 4.037905°N 9.720447°E	2007	Koko Komégné	Permanent sculpture	Red painted iron tubes.	High: 5 m; wingspan: 2,5 m; iron tubes diameter 12 cm.	Njé Mo Yé, which means "c’est quoi, çà?" in douala language,	Doual'art	Public artwork commissioned in the frame of SUD Salon Urbain de Douala.
	Arbre à palabres	Bonanjo 4.043768°N 9.687152°E	2007	Frédéric Keiff	Permanent pyramidal sculpture	Painted iron rebars, broken glasses, plastic bonded silicone.	height: 5,1 m; wingspan: 7m.	A palaver tree whose trunk and branches are made of painted iron rods, while attached fragments of colored glass represent leaves.	doual'art	Public artwork commissioned in the frame of SUD Salon Urbain de Douala. The work was presented during the SUD Salon Urbain de Douala 2007.
	Face à l’eau	Bonamouti-Deido 4.072072°N 9.710385°E	2008–2010	Salifou Lindou	Permanent pyramidal sculpture	wood, metal and colored plastic sheets	5 panels 5 m high.	Face à l’eau consists of five vertical panels made of wood, metal, and colored plastic sheets on the banks of the river Wouri in Bonamouti.	Artwork commissioned in the frame of SUD Salon Urbain de Douala and produced within the Liquid Projects. Donated to the Communauté Urbaine de Douala (owner).	The five single shutters, the highest of which measures 3.7 meters, are installed in such a way that at a certain distance they give the impression of a single screen. The installation is meant to protect the boatmen and fishermen from the view of the passers-by when they wash at the end of their day's work. Restoration: 2013, replacement of broken plastic sheets and dislocation on a higher position. The work was presented during the SUD Salon Urbain de Douala 2010.
	Les Globe-Trotters	Stairs of Boulevard de la République, Bali 4.041009°N 9.69286°E	2009	Philippine Barbou	Permanent artwork	Painted iron rebars.	2.85 meters high on 3 meters large with a 90 cm depth	Globe-Trotters is an installation made of yellow painted iron rebars that graphically represent two travellers.	Public artwork produced by doual'art and donated to the Communauté Urbaine de Douala (owner).	Les Globe-Trotters is an installation offered by the artist Philippine Barbou to doual'art. The artist wanted to pay tribute to the city not as a touristic destination itself, but as a fundamental step, where all travellers converge to rest before leaving for outside the country.
	Corps d'eau	Cité Sic 4.048822°N 9.735882°E	2010	Aser Kash	Permanent sculpture		wingspan 0.80 meters, max height 3.75	5 sculptures	Sponsored by Doual'art[4] and donated to the Communauté Urbaine de Douala (owner).	After a residence of one year in his district in Douala, Aser Kash created Corps d’eau, five sculptures that together represent an important contribution to the urban plan of the site. The project is positioned along the road, in front of a very popular well in Cité Sic, the very first city built in Douala by SIC (Cameroon Building Society) in the great village of Bassa. The buildings are now very old, but since the creation of the University of Douala the area has become one of the most popular of the city. Artwork produced produced within the Liquid Projects. The work was presented during the SUD Salon Urbain de Douala 2010.
	Les Mots écrits de New Bell	New Bell 4.025429°N 9.710484°E	2010	Hervé Yamguen	Permanent public artwork, series of 5 murals.	Painted iron rebars, broken glasses, plastic bonded silicone.		a set of six mural installations. Artwork produced within the Liquid Projects.	Sponsored by Doual'art and donated to the Communauté Urbaine de Douala (owner).	The work was presented during the SUD Salon Urbain de Douala 2010.
	New Walk New Ways	New Bell Ngangue De 4.024356°N 9.709336°E à 4.02121°N 9.709421°E	2010	Kamiel Verschuren	Permanent artwork and infrastructure	Wood	2 km	Open-air gutters of the neighborhood New-Bell, realized with long wooden boards on which the artist wrote texts and words bound to water,	Public artwork commissioned in the frame of SUD Salon Urbain de Douala 2010.	With the project, Verschuren covered approximately 2 kilometers, open-air gutters of the neighborhood New-Bell. This covering of gutter was realized with long wooden boards on which the artist wrote texts and words bound to water, which were drilled, so allowing the water to infiltrate while avoiding in the solid garbage to penetrate there. New Walk Ways New Bell was realized in association with the local residents. According to the artist, "the project opens for the inhabitants the possibility of mastering and of improving their city dwellers’ conditions and invites them to lead spontaneous collective activities as functional as meaningful and beautiful. As the project addresses the issue of collectivity, placing the New Walk Ways is as important and meaningful as the fact of them being absent. Conservation: few traces still remain often at private entrances. most of wooden planks have been deteriorated by water, taken by inhabitants to be reused, or substituted with other wooden planks.
	Pont Source	Ndogpassi III 4.012065°N 9.761014°E	2010	Ties Ten Bosh	Architectural and infrastructural artwork.	Wood	Height 2.3 meters	Architectural and infrastructural artwork commissioned in the frame of SUD Salon Urbain de Douala.	Sponsored by doual'art[30] and donated to the Communauté Urbaine de Douala (owner).	The work was presented during the SUD Salon Urbain de Douala 2010.
	Le puits	New Bell Ngangue, in front of Yamguen house 4.025012°N 9.709996°E		Loris Cecchini	Permanent artwork and infrastructure	Reinforced concrete.	Height 110 cm, diameter 140 cm.	Pit transformed in ornamental sculpture	Public artwork and infrastructure commissioned in the frame of SUD Salon Urbain de Douala.	The work was presented during the SUD Salon Urbain de Douala 2010. The Italian artist Loris Cecchini decided to cover the rim of a pit used in the district of New Bell Ngangue with moulding cans of different shapes used to collect and keep water from wells or other sources. Le Puits has become an ornamental sculpture in the very deteriorated urban environment of the district (an alternative design was realized by Kamiel Verschuren, Lucas Grandin and Kaleb de Groot).
	Le Jardin sonore	Bonamouti, Deïdo 4.072029°N 9.71053°E	2010	Lucas Grandin	Permanent architectural artwork and botanical garden	Wood, irrigational system, metal cans, botanical garden		Public architectural artwork and infrastructure commissioned in the frame of SUD Salon Urbain de Douala.	Sponsored by doual'art and donated to the Communauté Urbaine de Douala (owner).	The work was presented during the SUD Salon Urbain de Douala 2010.
	La Colonne Pascale	New Bell 4.026144°N 9.706345°E	2010	Pascale Marthine Tayou	Permanent monumental artwork (totem).	a sculpture made of pots in Vitreous enamel		Public monumental sculpture commissioned in the frame of SUD Salon Urbain de Douala.	Sponsored by doual'art and donated to the Communauté Urbaine de Douala (owner).	The work was presented during the SUD Salon Urbain de Douala 2010.
	Pavilion Urbain de Douala PUB	Bonanjo, Espace doual'art 4.043757°N 9.68702°E	2010	RAW/2012 Architects, ICU art projects	Permanent pavilion, architectural artwork			Architectural artwork	doual'art	The work was conceived for the SUD Salon Urbain de Douala 2010.
	Oasis	New Bell 4.024469°N 9.709097°E	2010	Tracey Rose	Permanent murals.	Wall painting.	Two walls of a school court in New Bell Ngangue	Murals of 8 meters long each	Murals commissioned in the frame of SUD Salon Urbain de Douala. Sponsored by doual'art and owned by the Ecole CBC Babylon in New Bell.	The work was presented during the SUD Salon Urbain de Douala 2010. The artist Tracey Rose came for her first residence to Douala in November 2009. She created a performance in which a video was projected during the exhibition Raison d’être in the space doual’art on the theme of Mamy Wata. Oasis is a mural realized in the school playground of New Bell Ngangue in Douala, the CBC Babylon School. The artist stigmatizes the disrespect of the environment which provokes, in the fragile ecosystem of the mangrove swamp of the Cameroonian coast, a dramatic pollution of waters of the estuary of the river Wouri at the bottom of which is situated the city of Douala. The CBC Babylon School is a private Baptist educational institution of New Bell Ngangué, including a kindergarten and a primary school. Beside its educational offer, the school has become nowadays a famous landmark of New Bell for public art and cultural activities. On the external wall it is possible to see one of the installations Les Mots Écrits de New Bell by Hervé Yamguen reproduced as a mosaic of tiles. The courtyard of the school, instead, was used as an open-air space for movie projections organized at night in the frame of the cultural program "Cinema du Kwatt" by the Group Kapsiki in 2010.
	Pirogue Céleste	Place de l'esplanade at former airport, Bonapriso 4.016586°N 9.706752°E	2009–2011	Hervé Youmbi	Permanent public artwork.	Forged metal	base of the canoe: length 5 meters, height 0.80 cm; prue: length 5 meters; total height of 3.20 cm	Artwork commissioned in the frame of SUD Salon Urbain de Douala and produced within the Liquid Projects.	Sponsored by Doual'art and donated to the Communauté Urbaine de Douala (owner).	The work was presented during the SUD Salon Urbain de Douala 2010.La Pirogue Céleste by Hervé Youmbi is a representation of a dugout endowed with a figurehead worked in the ancient way, but realized in cut metal instead of traditionally carved in wood. This figurehead, drawn in close collaboration with some young people of the neighborhood of Bonapriso, consists of signs which assert the contemporary identity of the city of Douala. The work is an interrogation on the complexity of the relation between tradition, memory and contemporaneity in this 21st century. La Pirogue Céleste, which attractiveness was improved thank to benches and flowers, was installed on the esplanade of the Former Airport… and is now one of the rare green public gardens of the city with a public equipment.
	Dear Goddy	Bonendale 4.07086°N 9.39392°E	2012	Sandrine Dole	Permanent artwork	Wood, iron and steel.		Commemorative stone dedicated to Goddy Leye.	ArtBakery	
	Mural on the Bilingual Lyceum of Deïdo	Lycée bilingue de Deïdo De 4.065923°N 9.715281°E à 4.064896°N 9.714884°E			Permanent murals.	Wall paint.			Communauté Urbaine de Douala.	
	Mural on the Bilingual Lyceum of Akwa	Lycée bilingue d'Akwa De 4.051251°N 9.703029°E à 4.052418°N 9.703973°E			Permanent murals.	Wall paint.			Communauté Urbaine de Douala.	
	Tête de Rêves	Thomas Fashion façade, Vallée Bessengue, Bessengué-Akwa	2013	Boris Nzebo	Permanent murals and metal	Wall	Height 2 meters, length 3 meters, depth 6 cm	Wall painting on the external walls of a hair salon		Tête de rêves is the artwork produced by the Gabonese artist Boris Nzebo for SUD 2013. The artist, known for his research approach that relates the traditional and contemporary culture of African hairstyles with urban environment, worked on the external walls of the shop "Thomas fashion", a hair salon located at the heart of the Vallée Bessengue. Tête de rêves occupies the two most visible sides of the hair salon. The main façade shows a bright wall painting, representing the profiles of mannequins for hairdressers and geometrical shapes. This façade was produced in collaboration with Joe Kessy, an artist living and working in the neighborhood. On the front side of the salon, the artist has hanged a 3 meters long metal plate on which he has applied three giant portraits of mannequins for hairdressers, with more elaborated and contemporary hairstyle. Commissioned in the frame of SUD Salon Urbain de Douala. The work was presented during the SUD Salon Urbain de Douala 2013.
	Espace de jeux	Vallée Bessengue, Bessengue-Akwa	2013	Raumlabor	Infrastructural work.	wood	Undefined surface. Max height : 3,5 m	Prototype of a playground		Espace de jeux is the prototype installation of a playground produced by Raumlabor, a group of architects from Berlin, for SUD 2013. The installation is a wooden structure, in form of a prolongation of the trunk of the only tree positioned on the border of the Mbopi River. Espace de jeux is built on many levels that reach the first branches of the tree. It offers scaffolds of different areas and heights for people to sit and rest in the shadow. Espace de jeux provides a new conviviality space in the area, primarily dedicated to children. Conservation: bad conditions due to the utilization of the inhabitants and the deterioration of the woodInfrastructure commissioned in the frame of SUD Salon Urbain de Douala. The work was presented during the SUD Salon Urbain de Douala 2013.
	Madiba square	Block 1 Bessengue-Akwa	2013	Pascale Marthine Tayou	Infrastructural work.	concrete	3 set ups of different sizes. surface 2 meters X 1 meter and max height 3,5 meters	3 set ups		Madiba square is a set of three installations conceptualized by Pascale Martine Tayou for SUD 2013. Each set is composed of a group of three concrete columns, each one placed on a circular base, large enough to sit down. At the upper end of each column there is a reversed basin or bucket of common use, made of plastic and of different colors. Each group of columns forms an area on its own, within which a rectangular block of concrete serves as a bench. The idea of the artist was to strengthen the recreational activities in the areas of transition of the neighborhood by providing footholds and conviviality points in the proximity of houses, where it is possible to stop, to lean against, and to rest. Infrastructural artwork commissioned in the frame of SUD Salon Urbain de Douala. The work was presented during the SUD Salon Urbain de Douala 2013.
	Theatre Source	Ndogpassi III	2010–2013	Philip Aguirre	Proximity artwork	Béton	Width 20 m, length 30 m, height 23 m	an artistic creation that reinforces the aspect of an amphitheatre of the site of a natural spring in Ndogpassi 3		After his residence in Douala in January 2010, Philip Aguirre decided to carry out the Theatre Source, an artistic creation that reinforces the aspect of an amphitheatre of the site of a natural spring in Ndogpassi 3, an area of Douala. Le théâtre source is an amphitheater made of concrete, designed by the Belgian artist Philip Aguirre for SUD 2013, and built with the help of architect Mauro Lugaresi. According to the theme of SUD 2013, the artist decided to metamorphose the natural shape of the area surrounding the water source of Ndogpassi III with a structure typical to ancient Rome. Le théâtre source presents six different levels, each one of about twenty meters of length, and three scenic plateaus, accessible from three flights of stairs (two laterals and one central-positioned). The installation allows accommodating nearly one thousand people. The production process of Le théâtre source lasted three years, requiring a long mediation with local community. Ndogpassi III is an isolated and marginalized informal settlement out of Douala, inhabited by immigrant population since the last ten years. The area inspiring Philippe Aguirre's work was a multi-level depression ground of mud over the only source of water of Ndogpassi III. The natural water is located at the ground level of Le théâtre source in a central position, and it remains an important landmark for locals, especially women and children, who used to meet there for chatting and playing football. The lateral stairs of the installation facilitate the passage between two dirty roads, which were disconnected earlier. Artwork commissioned in the frame of SUD Salon Urbain de Douala. The work was presented during the SUD Salon Urbain de Douala 2013.
	C.A.I.R.E.	Bonamouti-Deido	2013	Kamiel Verschuren, Lucas Grandin et Amandine Braud	proximity artwork			A development work of the domestic area in exchange of the authorization to use a façade of their house for producing an artistic intervention.		C.A.I.R.E., an acronym standing for Collective Artistic/Architectural Interventions that are Responsible and Ethical, is a large and ambitious project conceived by a group of three international artists, Kamiel Verschuren (NL), Lucas Grandin (FR) and Amandine Braud (FR), who have "metamorphosed" the neighborhood of Bonamouti-Deido for SUD 2013. The art process and the final results are perfectly interwoven, producing what can be considered as relational art. The C.A.I.R.E. group negotiated a sort of "barter" with dwellers: a development work of the domestic area in exchange of the authorization to use a façade of their house for producing an artistic intervention. A process embedded in the local context, with the aim to be involved in families’ stories, to understand their priorities, and to select the group of inhabitants with whom exchange art for development. A stairway over the mud for a disable woman, outdoor curtains for protecting from the hot sun, doors, terraces, amenities, and a commercial start-up are all the development projects produced by C.A.I.R.E. For the production of artworks, C.A.I.R.E. further opened the boundaries of the neighborhood, inviting a group of national and international artists, including Salifou Lindou (living and working in Bonamouti-Deido), Romuald Dikoumé (CM), Aser Kash (CM), Leah Touitou (FR) and Malala Andrialavidrazana (MG), to enter locals’ private spaces, involving them in the art process. Featured artists proposed graffiti, stamps, poetries, and innovative photographic techniques to reshape and give value to the entire neighborhood. Artwork produced within the artist group C.A.I.R.E. and commissioned in the frame of SUD Salon Urbain de Douala. The work was presented during the SUD Salon Urbain de Douala 2013.
	Floating Quai	Deïdo Plage, Bonamouti-Deïdo	2013–2014	Juan Fernando Herran	proximity artwork			a wooden scaffolding on the bank of the Wouri river made of several pontoons recalling the shape of traditional canoes.		Floating Quai is a work by the Colombian artist Juan Fernando Herran, started for SUD 2013, and continued in January 2014 by the architect Mauro Lugaresi. However today the work is not finished yet, according to the initial project. It is a wooden scaffolding on the bank of the Wouri river made of several pontoons recalling the shape of traditional canoes. With this work the artist wanted to pay homage to the fluvial tradition of Bonamouti dwellers, a population of fishermen who still today make use of dugouts (traditional canoes carved into the wood) to run their business. The floating dock offers a foothold and shelter for canoes, allowing fishermen to land on the shore regardless of the tide. Artwork commissioned in the frame of SUD Salon Urbain de Douala. The work was presented during the SUD Salon Urbain de Douala 2013.
	Cameroonian Heroes	jardin de doual’art, Place du Gouvernment, Bonanjo	2013	Hervé Youmbi	Passageway installation			Portraits of five Cameroonian politicians who, in different historical periods, fought and died for the independence.		Cameroonian Heroes represents the portraits of five Cameroonian politicians who, in different historical periods, fought and died for the independence: Ernest Ouandi, Ruben Um Nyobe, John Ngu Foncha, Felix Moumie, and Rudolf Douala Manga Bell. Despite their popularity, the current political establishment refuses to honor them. Youmbi decided to pay homage to these heroes of the resistance, symbolically dedicating them the names of streets, as reported by the metal plates below each portrait. Each plaque depicts, in addition to the politician's name and his date of birth and death, two flags. The first one is the Cameroonian flag, to indicate the home country of each personality. The second flag, instead, belongs to the nation that has caused the death of the portrayed politician. Another correlation is evident in the different shapes of the metal plates: each of them was chosen according to the typical plaque of streets that is possible to find in the country deemed guilty of the death of each politician. With this symbolic gesture, the artist intends to dedicate to Cameroonian heroes the streets of Paris, Berlin, and Yaounde. -->Inauguration: SUD Salon Urbain de Douala 2013
	Caravane d’images	Ndogpassi III	2013	Léah Touitou	Passageway installation			a permanent visual pathway into Ndogpassi III		Caravane d’images is an itinerant art project by the French artist Léah Touitou presented for SUD 2013. Touitou, in collaboration with the local artist Edwige Ndjeng directed a series of open-air ateliers of painting and production of murals. The project was an opportunity for children and mothers to learn the basic techniques of painting, and to exhibit their drawings (around 40 pieces) during SUD 2013. At the same time, the artists directly involved a group of local young people in the conceptualization and production of murals, presenting textual, graphic and figurative signs. Caravane d’images created a permanent visual pathway into Ndogpassi III, leading from the house of the neighborhood's chief to Le théâtre source, the amphitheater near the water source, produced by Philippe Aguirre. Inauguration: SUD Salon Urbain de Douala 2013

=== Temporary or disappeared artworks ===
Image	Title / subject	Location and coordinates	Date	Artist / designer	Type	Material	Dimensions	Designation	Owner / administrator	Notes
	doual'art pop'93	Madagascar suburb	1993	Koko Komégné, Kouo Eyango, Joël Mpah Dooh, Aimé Tallo, René Tchebetchou	mural.	Wall paint	152 meters	Wall paint of 150 meters.	Sponsored by doual'art and donated to the Communauté Urbaine de Douala	The artistic director of the project, Koko Komegne, brought together four masters of art in Cameroon. Each artist (including Koko Komegné himself) worked with a group of three young painters of the district. In total 20 people expressed themselves on hoardings of 150 m long . Didier Schaub, the curator of the project, defined the general theme of the fresco to be developed by artists which has to suggest to the public "the key for understanding the neighborhood". The work took place during five afternoons. It was located in front of the new market in the district of Madagascar. This painting is completely deteriorated, no longer existing.
	BendSkins	Douala streets and roads	2007	Philippe Mouillon and Lionel Manga	Public event	Fabric		100 words / phrases that synthesizes the personal history of 200 motorcycle taxis drivers (the bend-skins), and 200 T-shirts-uniform.		The work was presented during the SUD Salon Urbain de Douala 2007.
	Les Néons d'Amour	New Bell Ngangué	2007	Hervé Yamguen	temporary exhibition	Néon		Neon Light plays		Night falls over New Bell — During the week of SUD, Hervé Yamguen made Neon of Love gleam by installing it on facades of unfinished buildings in New Bell. Drawings became neon, radiating soft light upon everyday life, and illuminating the buzzy night life. A child of New Bell, Hervé Yamguen brought a week of poetic ambience to his neighbours. The work was presented during the SUD Salon Urbain de Douala 2007
	Black Bodies Swinging	abandoned house of Prince Alexandre Ndoumbé	2007	Michèle Magema	temporary exhibition			Black objects picturing bodies, swinging.		The work was presented during the SUD Salon Urbain de Douala 2007
	Les Neuf Notables	Madagascar suburb	2007	Joseph-Francis Sumégné	temporary exhibition			nine models of notables (Representatives of the traditional political power in villages).		The work was presented during the SUD Salon Urbain de Douala 2007
	Fantasia Urbaine	Streets in city center, Bonanjo et Akwa.	2007	Pascale Marthine Tayou	public performance			Demonstration of about 200 street vendors		The work was presented during the SUD Salon Urbain de Douala 2007
	Responsabilité, l’habilité à répondre	Rues et boulevard du centre ville, Bonanjo et Akwa.	2007	Kamiel Verschuren	public event			Questioning and understanding public life in the city.		Inauguration: International workshop Ars&Urbis 2007
	Le Zébu De Douala	Bonanjo	2007	Lucas Grandin	public event			a zebu, a carriage and a dj se		The work was presented during the SUD Salon Urbain de Douala 2007
	Ring, another kind of picture show	Bonendale	2007	The Collective Autodafe – Art Bakery/Goddy Leye/Cercle Kapsiki/Dominique Malaquais/Aretha Louise Mbango	Public performance					The work was presented during the SUD Salon Urbain de Douala 2007
	Flag'art	Espace doual’art, Place du Gouvernement, Bonanjo	2007	Multiples artists	temporary exhibition		Flags hoisted and varnished on a matt peak at 8 meters above doual'art		Doual’art	Flag art is a concept launched by doual'art in January 2009 as part of its temporary public art program. Flag's art is a conceptual platform that offers artists to make visual statements on the consequence of a flag. Artists are invited to submit their proposals for artistic flags on an open theme. The flags have been hoisted and varnished on a matt peak at 8 meters above doual'art.
	Paï	Avenue de General De Gaulle/Rue des Hydrocarbures, Bonanjo 4.026743°N 9.690573°E	2008	Kouo Eyango	Permanent sculpture	thirty six paddles in circle.	3 size categories (2,95m, 3,65m and 3,98m), arranged in four (4) columns of nine (9).	Sculpture with paddles	Sponsored by doual'art and donated to the Communauté Urbaine de Douala	Temporarily installed on the Place of the Recipe of finances during SUD2007, this work was definitively implanted in Bonanjo in March 2009. Paï is a ‘forest of paddles’ – to use the expression of its author – realized in wood and metal; a tribute to the traditional fishermen of the past.
	Diving in Deep – Pont Source	Ndogpassi III	2010	Ties Ten Bosch	temporary exhibition			Ephemeral and proximity installations.		Art public commissionné dans le cadre du SUD Salon Urbain de Douala. After his first residence to Douala in June 2010, Ties Ten Bosch decided to settle down as a resident for 2 months (in October–December 2010) in Ndogpassi 3, to lead the project Diving in Deep, a series of artistic interventions and to create a laboratory opened for the inhabitants to exchange ideas and thoughts with them on the realities of the neighborhood. His project turns around a creative process, where the residents are encouraged to find their own solutions. He left a car wooden bridge in Ndogpassi, the Pont Source, which he realized in association with neighbors.: 1. Where the streets have no name : To create more identity in the area, names were given to the streets, because they only had a number.; 2. Journal de l’eau : Everyday a bottle of water from the source and one from the river to symbolize the duration of the project in Ndogpassi III; 3. Le Plongeoir : A laboratory that functions as a growing presentation for all interventions during the stay in Ndogpassi III; 4. La Piscine : pixel-art sur la recidence auto-créé en Ndogpassi III.
	Ghorfa_7	Mangrove sur les rives du Wouri 4.001854°N 9.67455°E	2010	Younès Rahmoun	Œuvre d'art architecturale	Wood	inside : 214 x 236 x 185 cm	Proximity artwork	Sponsored by doual'art and donated to the Communauté Urbaine de Douala	In December 2010, a seventh Ghorfa takes root in the Mangrove swamp surrounding the city of Douala. The mangrove is one of the most productive ecosystems in biomass of our planet, an effective stabilizer for the fragile coastal zones. During his residence in May 2010 in Douala, Younès Rahmoun chose the mangrove as a hosted site of his entitled project Ghorfa #7. "Ghorfa" is a replica of the room, which he occupied in the family house in Tétouan (Morocco). With this installation, the artist invites us to experience what symbolizes or embodies a space of work and meditation. This space of meditation takes all its sense in an environment so fragile as the mangrove.Ghorfa #7 was made in local materials. The work is no longer existing due to the deterioration of the wood
	United Sources of Douala	Pont du Wouri bridge	2010	Bili Bidjocka	temporary exhibition/event			160 flags (80 each side)		After his residence in October 2010, Bili Bidjocka produced United Sources of Douala. This multimedia project consisted of an installation of flags on the bridge of the Wouri and throughout the city, close to natural water sources reported on a city map. It also included a performance in which water supplies were offered to the citizens, and the documentation of certain water points gathered from the inhabitants and made accessible on the Internet.
	Parcours liquide	House of Bell family, next to l’Espace doual’art, Bonanjo	2010	Christina Kubisch	temporary exhibition			Parcours liquide is a sound installation using the technique of electromagnetic induction based on the interaction of magnetic fields arising from electrical wires in which the prerecorded sounds of water circulated. Headphones developed by the artist allow the viewers/listeners to vary and mix the sounds and become composers themselves.		In July 2010, with her assistant Eckie Güther, Christina Kubisch made a workshop on sound recording at the art center of doual’art. She recorded old and new water wells, local washing places, hidden areas at the river Wouri, voices of children and the Douala symphonic choir with songs about the river Wouri and, of course, the unceasing rain in July.The work was presented during the SUD Salon Urbain de Douala 2010.
	Bessengue B’Etoukoa	Vallée Bessengue, Bessengue-Akwa	2013	Trinity Session	public event	Head and hair		public event (video installation, performance, hairstyles show		The urban fabric shaping ‘Vallée Bessengue’, with its small businesses and social spaces, appears as a hub of concentrated human activity. Furthermore, the dynamic presence of ‘Thomas Fashion’ within the location (Thomas, a coiffure born and raised in Douala) offered an iconic site for social and creative production. Thomas as person and stylist is central to the continuity of social life in the area because he provides intense creative energy inside and outside of his hairdressing salon. A location between a bridge and a water pump in front of Thomas Salon was identified as a site for the project. This circular public space extend in a linear way along the river into the valley, providing a sense of ‘spatialisation’ for a performative spectacle, in varied staged events. Thomas’ sustained connection to the landscape and his myriad creative talents enabled the idea of a performative collaboration and event. The intervention took place over a period of six days, where a selected group of participants (chosen by Thomas for their particular life journeys) inspired a varied range of hair and fashion styles. The Event did not have conventional control mechanisms for positioning the audience in relation to the performance. However, the neighborhood mushroomed in and around the event site, blocking the pathways and preventing cars and motorbikes from crossing the bridge. Up to 3.000 stop frame stills per participant were accumulated. The lens captured the emotional and psychological transformation of the person being styled and evolution of the form of the hair. The head served as a base landscape and the layers of braiding as a foundation for Thomas’ sculpture. The work was presented during the SUD Salon Urbain de Douala 2013.
	Les introuvables	Bessengue-Akwa	2013	Ginette Daleu	temporary exhibition	Sheet metal	55X65cm	8 phose impressed on sheet		The work was presented during the SUD Salon Urbain de Douala 2013

== Bibliography ==
- Pensa, Iolanda (Ed.) 2017. Public Art in Africa. Art et transformations urbaines à Douala /// Art and Urban Transformations in Douala. Genève: Metis Presses. ISBN 978-2-94-0563-16-6
- Marta Pucciarelli (2014) Final Report. University of Applied Sciences and Arts of Southern Switzerland, Laboratory of visual culture.
