= Hervé Youmbi =

Cameroonian artist

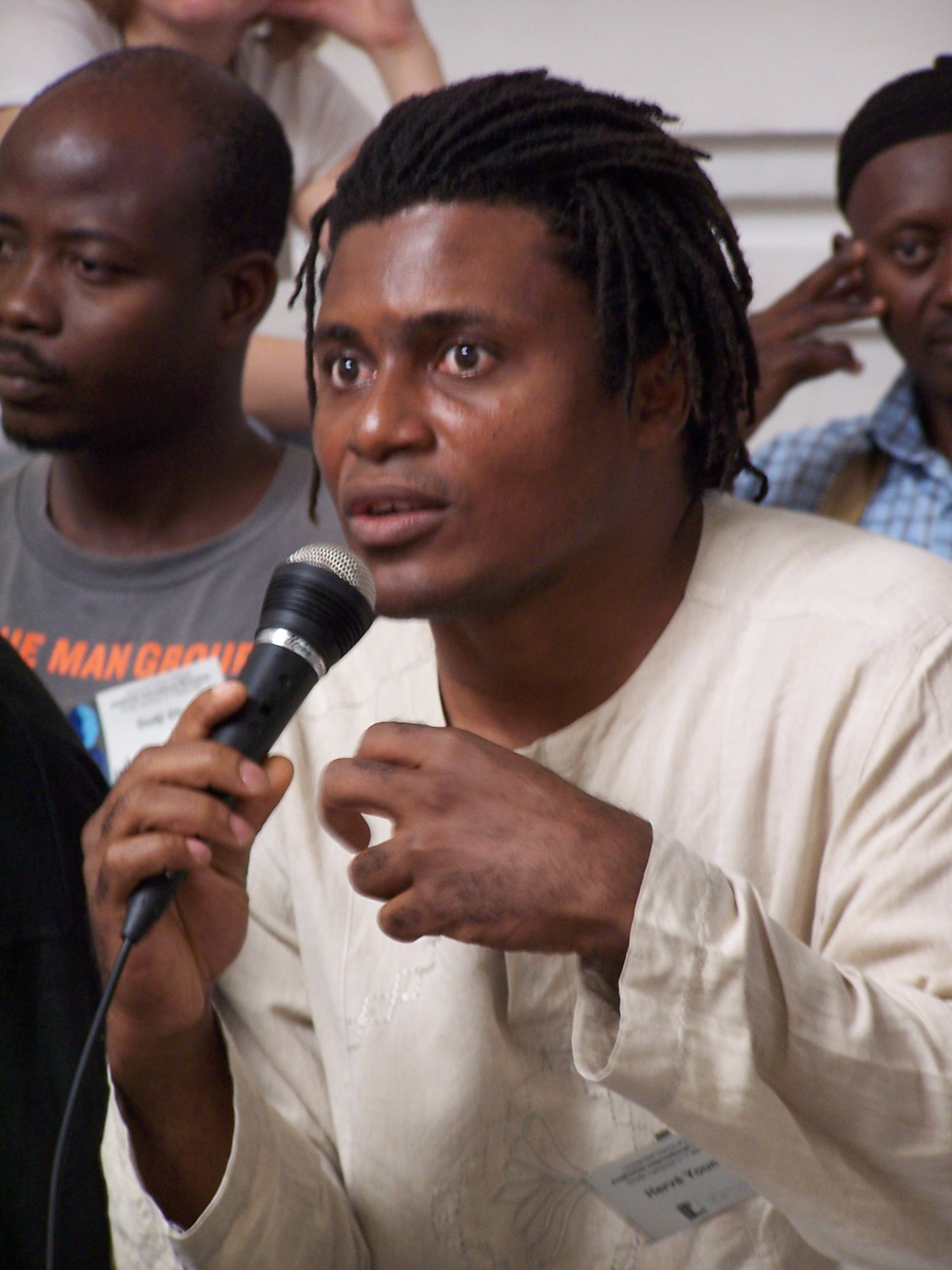
- Hervé Youmbi
- Born: March 25, 1973 (49); Bangui, Central African Republic
- Education: Institut de Formation Artistique (IFA), Mbalmayo (1993 – 1996)
- Alma mater: Ecole Supérieure des Arts Décoratifs (ESAD) Strasbourg (2000 – 2001)
- Known for: Sculpture, installation art, mixed media, screenprinting

Hervé Gabriel Ngamago Youmbi is a Cameroonian artist who lives and works in Douala. He is a founding member of the Cercle Kapsiki, a collective of five Cameroonian artists, founded in 1998.

== Biography ==
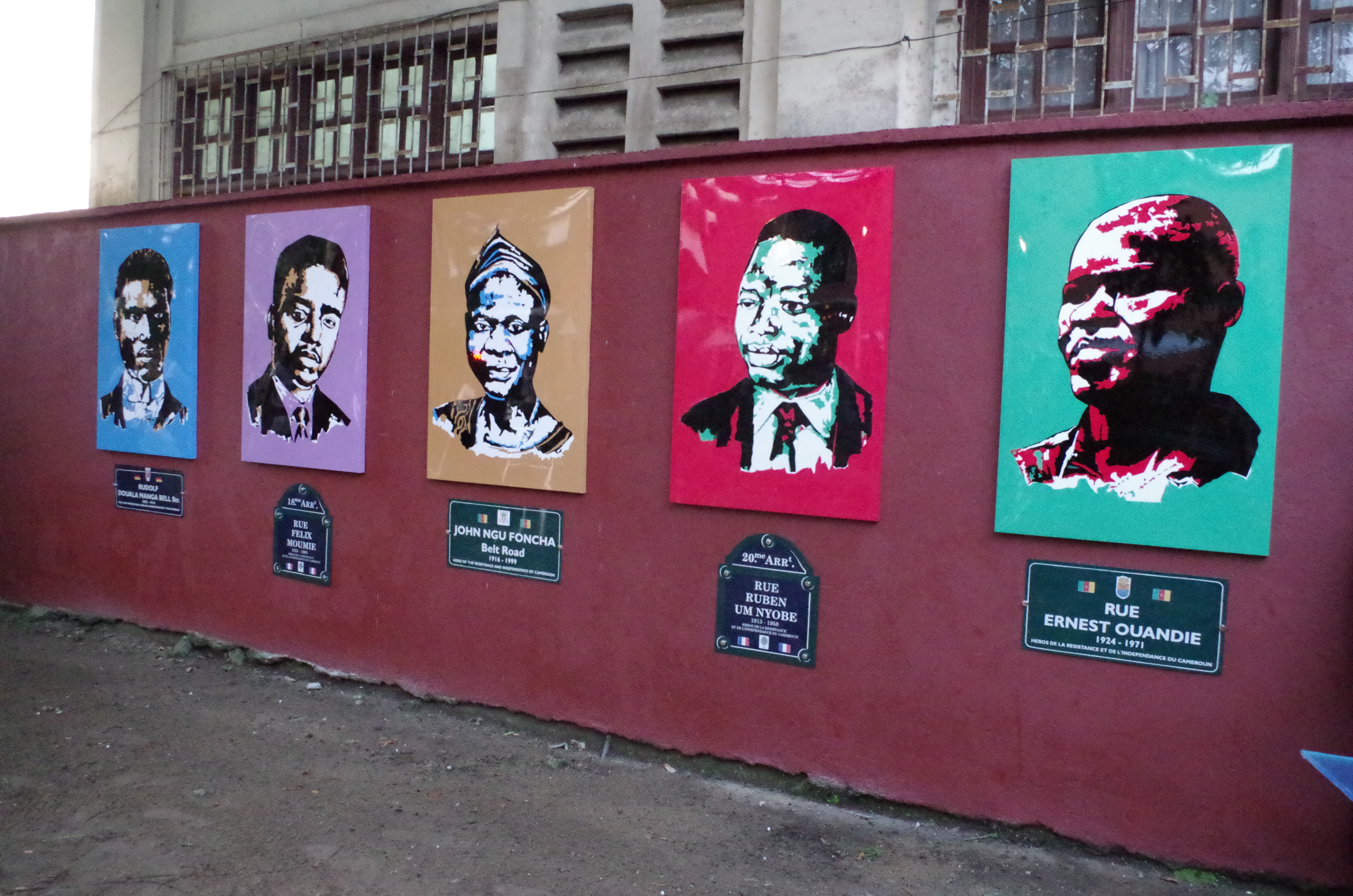
Portraits of five Cameroonian politicians who, in different historical periods, fought and died for independence

Hervé Youmbi was born in Bangui, Central African Republic on March 25, 1973. He earned a diploma from the Institut de Formation Artistique (IFA) in Mbalmayo, Cameroon, and later studied at the École Supérieure des Arts Décoratifs de Strasbourg (France) from October 2000 to June 2001. He teaches art in several towns in Cameroon, at the art institutes of Nkongsamba and Foumban, and in the art academies and universities of Douala and Dschang.

== Work ==
Portraiture forms the foundation of Youmbi’s artistic practice. By closely examining the human body within urban environments, he reflects on the cities he inhabits, the places he has traveled through, and those he aspires to understand more deeply. These themes evoke respect for his engagement with African history and politics, encouraging viewers to connect with his exploration of societal issues. In 2010, Youmbi addressed the effects of global capitalism on contemporary African art through the multimedia installation Ces totems qui hantent la mémoire des fils de Mamadou (These Totems That Haunt the Memory of the Sons of Mamadou). His 2012 photographic triptych, Au nom du père, du fils et de la sainte monarchie constitutionnelle (In the Name of the Father, the Son, and the Holy Constitutional Monarchy), explores violence and popular uprisings against dictatorial regimes in Africa. The installation Visages de Masques, presented at Bandjoun Station in Cameroon, examines how colonization and globalization have influenced the production of ritual masks. Historical inquiry remains central to his practice, as seen in works such as Cameroonian Heroes, presented at SUD 2007 in Douala, which honors early resistance to German colonization.

=== Listed works ===
- Visages de Masques (2015–Present).
- Totems to Haunt our Dreams (2010).

== Awards and recognitions ==
Hervé Youmbi received the Culturesfrance scholarship awarding him an artist visa in 2009, and the Smithsonian Artist Research Fellowship 2012 from the Smithsonian in Washington DC, USA. His works are in some leading collections, such as the World Bank and the Smithsonian National Museum of African Art in Washington. In 2020, one of his pieces was acquired by the Royal Ontario Museum in Canada.

== Bibliography ==
- Lumières d'Afriques. Hervé Youmbi.
- Africultures.
- Urbanscénos. Hervé Youmbi.
- " Masks on the move " article de Silvia Forni (p. 38-53) dans African Arts summer 2016, Vol 49, number 2, Californie/ USA, 2016
- " Lumières d'Afriques " Catalogue d'exposition Fondation AAD, Paris/ France, 2015
- " Stories tellers " Catalogue d'exposition Bandjoun station, Bandjoun/ Cameroun. 2015
- Arts et cultures d'Afrique. Vers une anthropologie solidaire. Sous la direction de Myrian-Odile Blin. Édition Presses Universitaires de Rouen et du Havre (PURH), Rouen/ France. 2014
- " CAMEROUN Une vision contemporaine 4 " World bank; Yaoundé/ Cameroun. 2014
- " Hervé Youmbi " Première monographie Texte de Dominique Malaquais pour Les carnets de la création, éditions de l'œil, Paris France. 2011
- " Public Culture " Institute for public knowledge Volume 23 By Duke university press, Durham, NC/USA 2011
- " Africultures n° 83 " Indépendances africaines: chroniques d’une relation, une interview de Virginie andriamirado, éditions l’Harmattan Paris/ France. 2011
- « Anthologie de L'Art african du XX siècle », édition Revue noire, Paris, France.
- Pensa, Iolanda (Ed.) 2017. Public Art in Africa. Art et transformations urbaines à Douala /// Art and Urban Transformations in Douala. Genève: Metis Presses. ISBN 978-2-94-0563-16-6

=== See also ===
- List of public art in Douala
- African art
