= Koung-Khi =

Department of West Province, Cameroon

- Department
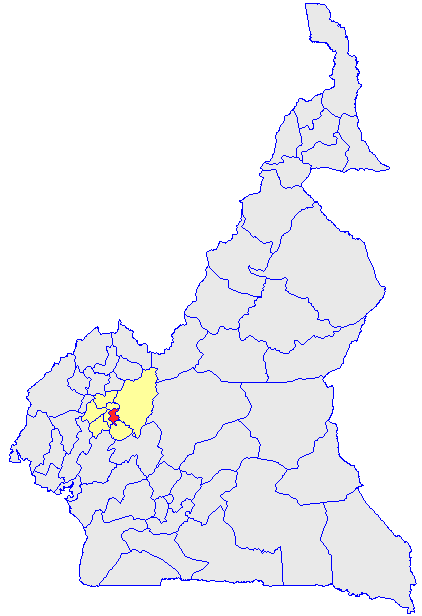
- Department location in Cameroon

- Location within Cameroon Location within Africa
- Country: Cameroon
- Province: West Province
- Capital: Bandjoun

Area
  - Total: 136 sq mi (353 km^{2})

Population (2019)
  - Total: 70,600
- Time zone: UTC+1 (WAT)

Koung-Khi is a department of West Province in Cameroon. The department covers an area of 353 km^{2} and as of 2005 had a total population of 65,021. The capital of the department is Bandjoun. The department was created in 1995 when the Mifi department was split up.

== Subdivisions ==
The department is divided administratively into 3 communes and in turn into villages.

=== Communes ===
- Bayangam
- Bandjoun
- Demding (or Demdeng)

=== Towns or villages ===
- Bandrefam
- Batoufam
