= Lazare Kaptué =

Cameroonian academic (1939–2021)

- Born: 1939; Mbanga, French Cameroon
- Died: 12 April 2021 (aged 81–82); Yaoundé, Cameroon
- Occupation: Academic

Lazare Kaptué (1939 – 12 April 2021) was a Cameroonian academic. He was active as a virologist and carried out much research on HIV/AIDS.

== Biography ==
Born in Mbanga in 1939, Kaptué served as Mayor of Demding in the west of Cameroon. He was also a professor at the Université des Montagnes, of which he was a founding member. His laboratory was known for discovering Group O of HIV-1. In addition to his academic career, he owned a clinic in Bastos Yaoundé.

Lazare Kaptué died in Yaoundé on 12 April 2021 at the age of 82.
