= Batoufam =

Batoufam Tswefap
- Commune and town
- Location in Cameroon
- Coordinates: 5°16′N 10°28′E
- Country: Cameroon
- Region: West Region
- Department: Koung-Khi

Area
  - Total: 66 sq mi (172 km^{2})

Population (172)
  - Total: 12,000
- Time zone: UTC+1 (WAT)

Batoufam (local language: Tswefap) is a town and commune in the department of Koung-Khi, Cameroon. It has an estimated population of 27,000. Batoufam is also a language and is part of the Bantu group of languages.

== History ==
The founder of Batoufam was named Nankap. He was a hunter and a member of Bleble, a Tikar people that moved from the Adamawa Plateau to Bali. During the migration to Bali, Nankam deserted the Bleble, and served the Bangwa Chief. He was very similar to the Bangwa Chief because of his hunting skills and service attitude. For this, he was give the title of "Fodoum" (translation: "Chancellor"). After Kankam fell in love with Princess Melo, the Bangwa Chief decided to kill Kankam. But when Nankap learned of the plot, he fled to Bandrefam. Eventually, the Chief of Bandrefam gave Nankap a plot (Tou-fam; translation: "above Fam") to build his home. After he moved from Bandrefam, he made a home in Batoufam (translation: "village of Tou-fam").

Nankap's grandson, Chief Lekouelieu, was the third leader of the dynasty. He bought and freed slaves. He also made alliances with neighbouring villages, and attracted new friends. After conquering another chief, Lelouelieu made the palace of the conquered chief into the Batoufam Chief's palace. The first eleven chiefs of the dynasty fought for Batoufam's autonomy and independence against Bandjoun, Bayangam, and Bangwa. The Chiefs Tchantchouang, Pokam, Metang, and Fotso expanded Batoufam territories. The tenth chief, Chief Pokam, introduced the pseudo bamboo, Raffia palm, Raphia farinifera, to Batoufam which energized the economy. Parts of the plant were used for home construction, furniture, and granaries. Other parts were extracted and made into a drink. Under Chief Pokan, farm instruments were introduced, as well as war armament, jewellery, drums and statues.

The twelfth chief, Chief Fotso, was known to be open-minded and eloquent. At the request by the Sultan of Bamoun who wanted people to occupy empty lands in his kingdom, Fotso established two sub-chieftaincies: Famla, headed by Foh-joueh, and Foumbot, headed by Fogue. When Fotso died in 1954, he had 60 wives and 123 children. In 1989, at the age of 22, Chief Nayang Toukam Innocent became the fourteenth Chief, succeeding his father, Chief Toukam Fotso Elie Roger. He is known for rallying Batoufam people in Cameroon and abroad. Nayang has travelled to France to manage the French association of Batoufam and has been instrumental in the creation of FABUSA, the Batoufam association in the United States. In November 2006, he negotiated for the return of Batoufam's Armouries of the Chieftaincy, symbols of the traditional power of the Chief.

Batoufam had a history violent reactions against the colonial regimes and it was not uncommon for whole families to commit suicide by hanging in Batoufan as a sacrifice for the cause of their peoples.

In 1947, there were proposals to cut down a sacred forest in Batoufam which created objections from all across Cameroon, so in the end the proposals were dropped.

== Geography ==
Batoufam is located in the West Region in the department of Koung-Khi. It is situated on the N4 highway, 291 km from Douala, 288 km from Yaoundé and 25 km south of Bafoussam. The commune, with an area of 172 km^{2}, contains villages such as Bayangam, Bandrefam, Bandjoun, Bangoua, Bangang-Fokam, Bangwa and Bangang-Fondji. Batoufam contains the quartiers of Tsengui, Chila, Mbé, Ndeptse, Toula, Kaptchié, Tsep, Nkamke, Nkasse, Nguigang Nkaniè.

The altitude of the commune ranges between 1400 and 1700 metres above sea level. There is an estimated 12,000 in Bafoufam, but about 50% of the natives live outside of the village in the major urban cities of Cameroon and abroad. The residents of the commune occupy an area of about 27 km^{2}, for a density of 218 persons/km^{2} as of 1976. In 2003, the Batoufam created the FABUSA (Famille Batoufam des USA). agreement with the United States.

== Economy ==
The people of the commune of Batoufam are mainly employed in agriculture and livestock. However, there is also a small increase in business; Batoufam has a local community bank, MC2.

== Education ==
Batoufam has several primary schools, both public and private. These include:

- Chefferie Kindergarten to Batoufam chiefdom
- Kindergarten to Batoufam marha (Kaptchié)
- Kindergarten to kagnis-Batoufam
- Public School Batoufam Market (kaptchié)
- Public School Batoufam Chefferie (Tula)
- Public-School kagnis Batoufam
- Public School Famla
- Catholic School Batoufam (Mbe)
- School of CEBEC Batoufam (Chila)

General secondary school education includes:

- Lyceum Batoufam
- SAR kagnis SM

== Communication ==
A monthly newspaper, La Tribune Batoufam, is produced each month for the village. It is based in Douala, produced by the painting company, Compagnie Equatoriale des Peintures (CEP) and is run by a team of volunteers. Dr. Armand Nghemkap writes a column for La Tribune Batoufam, providing public health prevention tips.

== Culture ==
The large, square house of the Bamileke chief is located in the village and it has a courtyard. It is the largest building in the village.

== List of village rulers ==
The Batoufam ruler's title is Fô. The rulers have been:

1. Nankam
2. ...
3. Lekouelieu
4. Nankap
5. Djipnang
6. Toukap
7. Nanche
8. Tchatchouang
9. Pwokap (Megaptche)
10. Metang
11. (−1927) Pokam
12. (1927–1954) Fotso David
13. (1954–1989) Toukam Fotso Elie Roger
14. (1989–present) Nayang Toukam Innocente

== See also ==
- Communes of Cameroon
