= Koko Komégné =

Cameroonian artist (1950–2025)

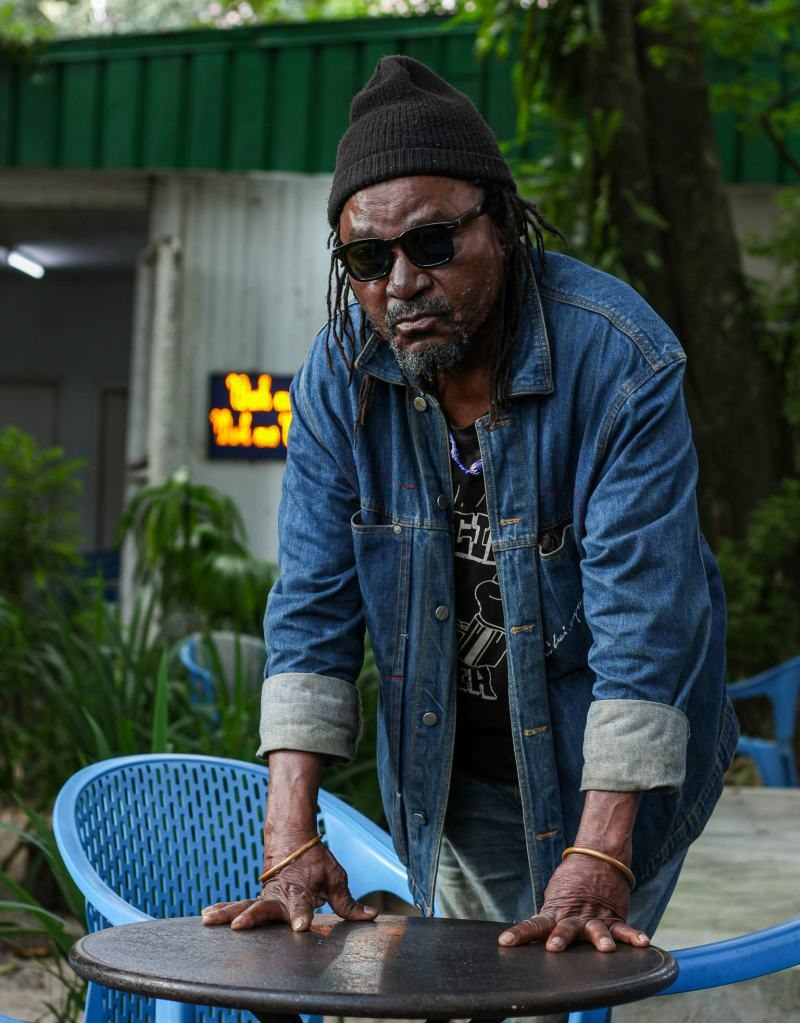
- Komégné in 2007
- Born: 1950; Batoufam, Southern Cameroons, British Cameroons
- Died: 28 October 2025 (aged 75); Douala, Cameroon
- Known for: Painting, sculpture, music

Koko Komégné (2 October 1950 – 28 October 2025) was a Cameroonian visual artist based in Douala and a promoter of the contemporary art scene in Cameroon.

== Life and career ==
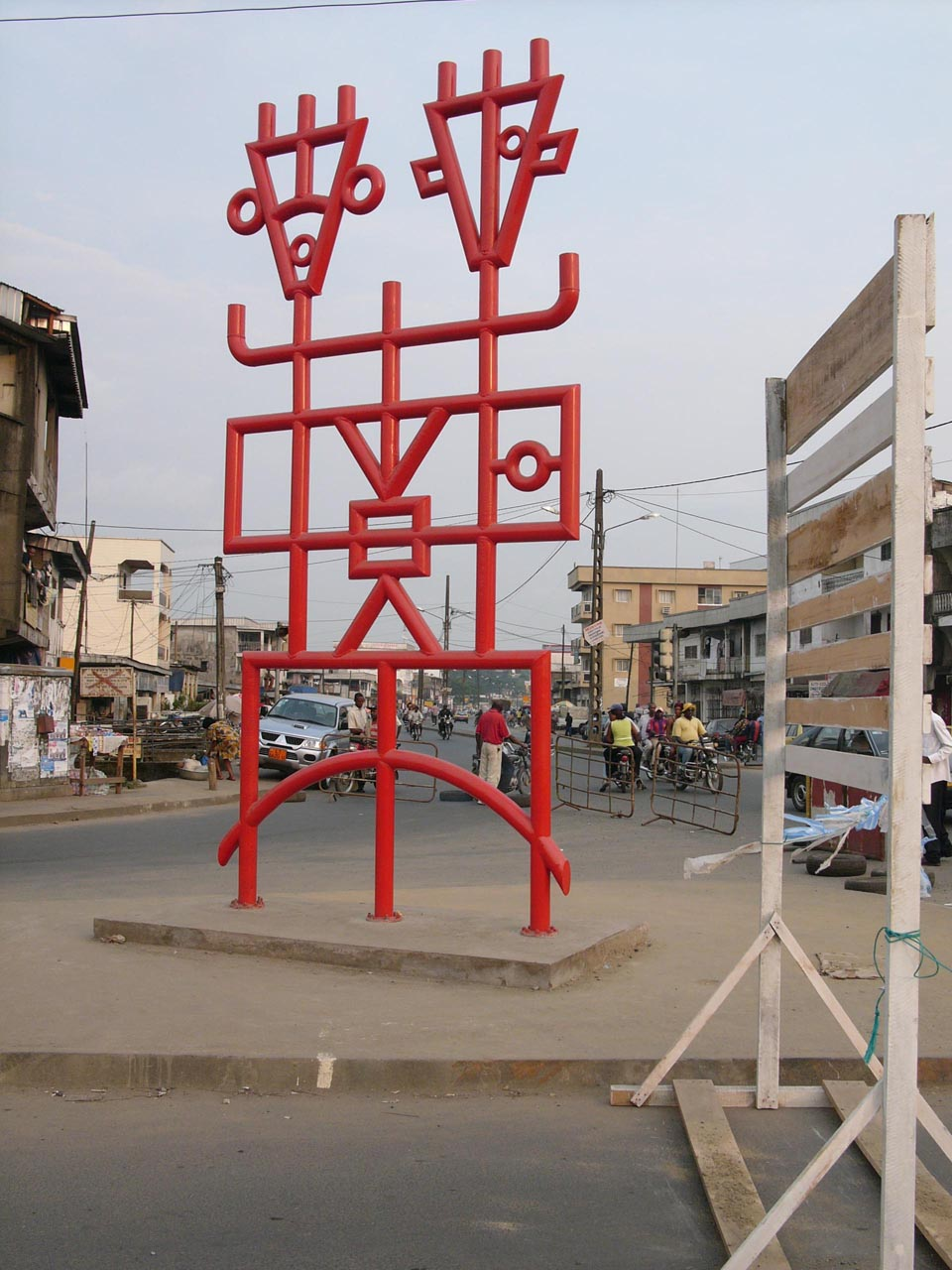
Njé Mo Yé, Douala, 2007

Koko Komégné was born in Batoufam in 1950. In 1956 he moved to Yaoundé where he attended school and he started drawing and listening to all sorts of music. In 1960–62 he produced his first sculpture, Le Boxeur. In 1965 he moved to Douala where he met Jean Sabatier who inspired him to paint. In 1966, Komégné opened his first atelier and began reproducing art works by major painters including Van Gogh and Picasso, and earned money by making advertising billboards. In 1968 he won the drawing competition Biscuits Berlin and worked for one year on a little boat which navigated the coasts of Central Africa. In 1971 he participated in his first group show organised in Douala by the Association Française pour la Formation des Cadres. In 1972 he opened a bar next to his house where he invited musicians and where he performed as percussionist and singer, and soon became the singer of the music group Black Power. In 1986 he decided to concentrate on painting, and moved to a quieter neighbourhood and he got married. In 1990 he married for the second time and he has a daughter to whom he later dedicates the 2008 Espace Doual'art exhibition Evanescence. He had four children in his third marriage. In 1997 he suffered an accident and was hospitalised for four months. In 2000, Komégné had to leave his atelier in the neighbourhood of Bonadibong in Douala and moved to the neighbourhood CCC.

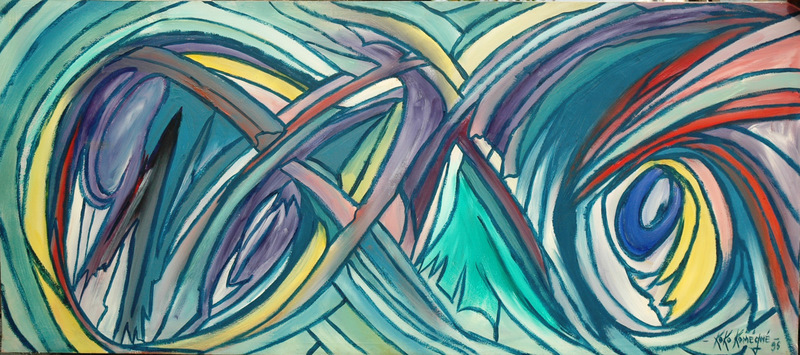
Koko Komégné, Labyrinthe, 1995

After signing his paintings "Komégné Gaston", "Koko Décor", "Gaston Komé", Komégné chose to sign with the name Koko Komégné, a combination of his father's name (Kouamo) and his own name. In his personal work, he concentrated on music, dance, prostitutes, poverty, nightlife and masks. In 1974 he produced the scene painting of the film Pousse Pousse by Daniel Kamga, the first Cameroonian film, and in 1976 he has his first solo show at Quartier Latin, a restaurant club in Douala. In 1979 he participated in the first competition for young Cameroonian painters. In 2005 DUTA, the first edition of the Biennale of Douala, devoted a tribute to Komégné and in 2006 Doual'art organised the wide solo shop Koko Komégné: 40 ans de peinture curated by Didier Schaub.

In 1985 he decorated the club Black et White in Limbe and the Hotel Arcade in Douala; in 1986 the Cabaret le Vieux Négre in Douala and in 1987 the Mountain Hotel in Buéa and the University Centre in Dschang; in 1989 the Hotel Hilton in Yaoundé decorated his rooms with lithographs by Koko Komégné; in 1993 he decorated the Phaco Club International and the Restaurant Parfait Garden in Douala; in 1994 the Central Hotel in Yaoundé; in 1995 the Hotel Méridien in Douala commissioned him a series of 11 frescos which will be distracted after the hotel changes management. In 2002 he makes frescos for the new building of the assurance company La Citoyenne in Douala and in 2003 the Hotel Sofitel Mont Fébé in Yaoundé decorated his 90 rooms with lithographs by Komégné.

In 1992 he participated in Art Venture, a workshop organised by the cultural organisation Doual'art which produced a fresco: a triptych 4.5 metres (15 ft) long by 1.5 metres (4 ft 11 in) high in plexiglas installed in Dakar Square in Douala. In 1993 he was the artistic director of Doual'art Pop '93, a workshop organised by Doual'art in the neighbourhood of Madagascar in Douala in which 25 artists produced frescos on stockades of a building yard; in the same year he participated in Cadavres exquis at the Mbappé Leppé Stadium in Douala and was a committee member of the Festival National des Arts et de la Culture. In 1997 he participated in Le Kwatt, a workshop organised by Doual'art in the neighbourhood Makepe Petit-Pays in Douala and in 1998 in Entr'Artistes curated by Mariela Borello at Doual'art. In March 2007 he participated in the Ars et Urbis International Workshop and in December in the SUD-Salon Urbain de Douala.

In 1994 he exhibited in Kwanza Holiday Black Expo in New York and in 1995 in the Ottakringer Museum in Austria. In 1997 he participated in the Daro Daro workshop in Abidjan, Ivory Coast and in 2003 in the group show Cameroon Connexion, curated by Yann Quennec in the gallery Pravda in Paris.

Komégné promoted art and artists in Cameroon; he participated in over 500 radio programmes, 100 TV programmes and 500 interviews on newspapers and magazines. In 1979 he created the first association of artists of Cameroon, Cercle Maduta ("meduta" means "images" in the Douala language) with the artists Viking Kanganyam, Jean-Guy Atakoua and Samuel Abélé. Cercle Maduta closed in 1983, and Komégné and other artists founded the Cercle des Artistes Plasticiens du Littoral (CAPLIT). In 1980 he exhibited in Menuiserie ETD MUCAM Meubles, a furniture shop; in 1981 he had his first retrospective show (1976–1982) at the American Cultural Centre and in 1982 at the French Cultural Centre in Yaoundé.

In 1994 Komégné was a founding member of the cultural association Kheops Club, which brought together ten Cameroonian artists with the aim of promoting visual arts in Cameroon. In 1995 he was the artistic director of the workshop UPEMBA. In 1995 he presented the young artists Joël Mpah Dooh, Blaise Bang, Salifou Lindou, Hervé Youmbi and Hervé Yamguen inside the exhibition "Tele Miso" at the MAM Gallery in Douala. In 2001 he curated the group show Yann & Co at the Atelier Viking and of Squatt'art, a one-week workshop and show with 22 artists open air in the neighbourhood Bali in Douala. In 2002 he participated in Squatt'art II in the neighbourhood Deïdo in Douala. Komégné was also a founding member of the artist-run art space Art Wash.

Komégné died on 28 October 2025, at the age of 75.
