= Atelier Viking =

Artist-run initiative in Douala, Cameroon

Atelier Viking is a studio and an artist-run initiative based in Douala, Cameroon.

Artist Viking Kanganyam André founded atelier Viking in March 1976 to promote contemporary art in Cameroon. The paucity of art galleries in Douala encouraged Kanganyam to create a space where artists could be trained and exhibited. Viking taught visual arts (painting, sculpture, graphic art, drawing and serygraphy) to small groups of students. Viking encouraged his students to explore the potentialities of all media and specifically the possibility of transforming and re-using materials found in loco. Concurrently to their activity of visual artists, they worked in advertising. Since 2001, Viking decided to devote his space mostly to exhibitions.

Atelier Viking is located in the neighbourhood of Bessengue, Rue Jamot face Garage Technique Auto, 100mt from Mobil Bonakouamuang. It collaborates with Art Wash.

== Exhibitions and Events Organised by Atelier Viking ==
- God Is A Butcher And I'm A Beautiful Piece of Meat, Raimo D. Nagel (14 December 2024 - 26 January 2025);
- Squat'art, Patrice Kemplo (2003) in collaboration with Art Wash;
- Sweet Again, Koko Komégné (18 December 2002 - 4 January 2003);
- Musoula Mo, Guy Wouete and Daniel Seppo exhibiting 26 paintings and installations (2002);
- Round table on selected themes: conviviality, solidarity and fraternity (2002);
- Lecture Café with Alioum Moussa, reading and debate on the art magazines and literature (March 2002);
- Yann and Co: Yanne Queinnec, Koko Komégné, Kanganyam Viking, Kouo Eyango, Nyah Delord, Massong Victor, Bernarnd Baïfang, Alium Moussa (May 2001).

== Bibliography ==
- Essombe Mouangué, L'Atelier Viking de Douala: un espace ouvert à toutes les sensibilités artistiques in "Africultures", 2002
- Essombe Mouangué, Expositions à Douala: Koko Komégné, Kouoh Eyango, Martin Njombè II in "Africultures", 2003
- Giulia Paoletti, Cultural and artistic initiatives in Douala in Douala in Translation. A view of the city and its creative transformative potentials, edited by Doual'art and iStrike Foundation, Episode Publishers, Rotterdam, 2007, pp. 243-247.
