= Bandrefam =

Bandrefam Ndiògfap
- Commune and town
- Location in Cameroon
- Coordinates: 5°13′N 10°29′E
- Country: Cameroon
- Region: West Region
- Department: Koung-Khi

Area
  - Total: 6.6 sq mi (17 km^{2})

Population
  - Total: 5,000
- Time zone: UTC+1 (WAT)

The Bandefram-Cameroon Chiefdom. Pronounced Ndiògfap in local language, this name means farmers of old vineyards. Although Bandrefam is the official name, the population of this chiefdom call themselves Kouo'shi, which means:emerging from the ground.

This name will take the form of Fab'gwe around 1921, then of Ndiògfap around 1928. Finally, the German colonists will call it Bandrefam, as it is known today.

The Kouo'shi are Bamiléké people (Semi-Bantu) who are descended from several generations of migrants from North Cameroon ’ time.
Bandrefam is located about 300 km from Douala the commercial capital of Cameroon, about 300 km of Yaounde the political capital and 25 km from Bafoussam, the regional capital.

At the administrative level, it is part of the Bayangam commune, in the Department of Koung-Khi in the West province of Cameroon. Since 2018, the Kingdom has been ruled by His Majesty Georges Jiejip Tchomgang, son of His Majesty Jiejip Pouokap who died in january 14, 2018 after an extensive illness. Georges Jiejip is the 105th King of a long dynasty founded by Fo Kaputse several centuries ago.Georges Jiejip was officially enthroned during a popular ceremony in November 30th 2024 after an extended stay in "Laah Nkam' a sort of traditional transition into power. The king is assisted in the exercise of his functions by Notables who sit in secret societies and neighborhood leaders.

== History ==
Bandrefam is a several-century-old kingdom. It was founded between the 12th and 13th century. It is one of the oldest kingdoms in the Bamiléké region. Because of inheritance quarrels between sons, this kingdom split up, leading to the creation of the chiefdoms Bangoua, Batoufam and Babouantou.
During the previous centuries, Bandrefam suffered from numerous attacks from its neighbors. The most recent one is the nine-year war against the Bangoua chiefdom. This fratricidal war ended with the signing of a peace treaty (Pact of reconciliation and forgiveness) between the two chiefdoms on September 30, 2006.

During the years of war, before and after the independence of Cameroon, Bandrefam got annihilated, like many other Bamiléké chiefdoms, by Ahidjo’s repressive regime, backed by the French army.(see Bamiléké genocide). This repressive violence contributed to a significant destruction of the population by tens of thousands. The majority of the survivors were forced to go into exile. Most of them never came back.

== Geography ==
Bordered on the West and South-West by Bangoua, on the North by Batoufam and on the East by Bagang-Fokam, Bandrefam covers an area of about 17 square km divided in six districts: Ngouonkouong, Nka’ala, Pou’guieu, Tchieu, Toula et Ntchi.
Its relief is formed by plateaus (Lô’oshitô, Tchî, Sinkouô) and mountains (Kouofiog, Kouomenang) interspersed with fertile valleys rich in fine sand.
Panchêh and Wooze are the main rivers running through the village.

The climate is tropical, characterized by a long dry season and a short rainy season.

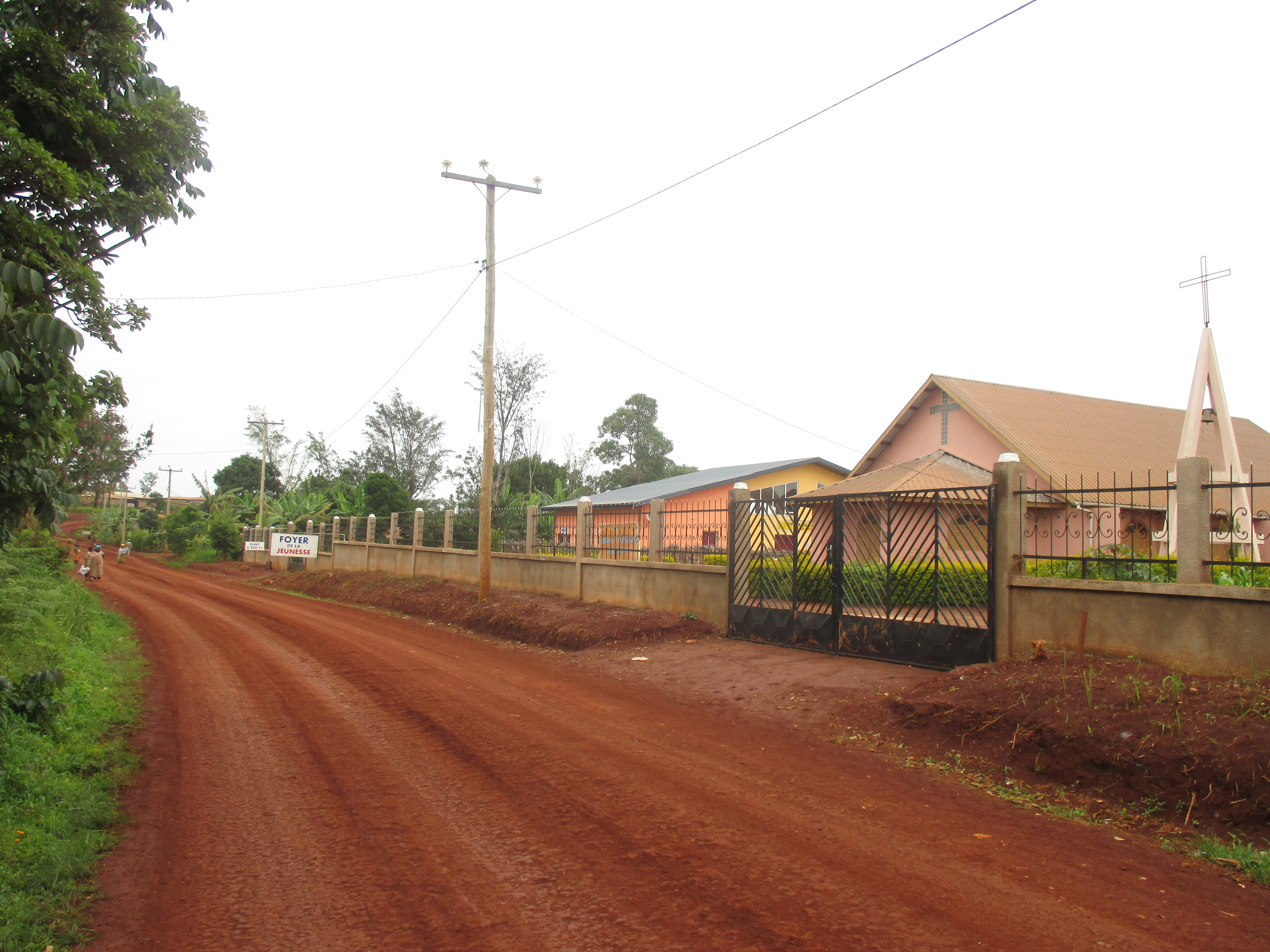
Regional Route(D63) crossing Bandrefam

== Population ==
The population of Bandrefam, relatively consistent, is estimated today at about five thousand (5000) inhabitants living in the kingdom’s area.
But in the late 1960s, there was a wave of nomadic Mbororo pastoralists from Northern Cameroon in search of pasture for their cattle. Also noted, since the outbreak of the civil war in 2017 in the two English-speaking provinces, a migratory flow of civilians who have come to settle in the village, in search of refuge and land to cultivate.

During harvesting time and funerals the population can increase substantially, because of relatives visiting temporarily from outside the kingdom.

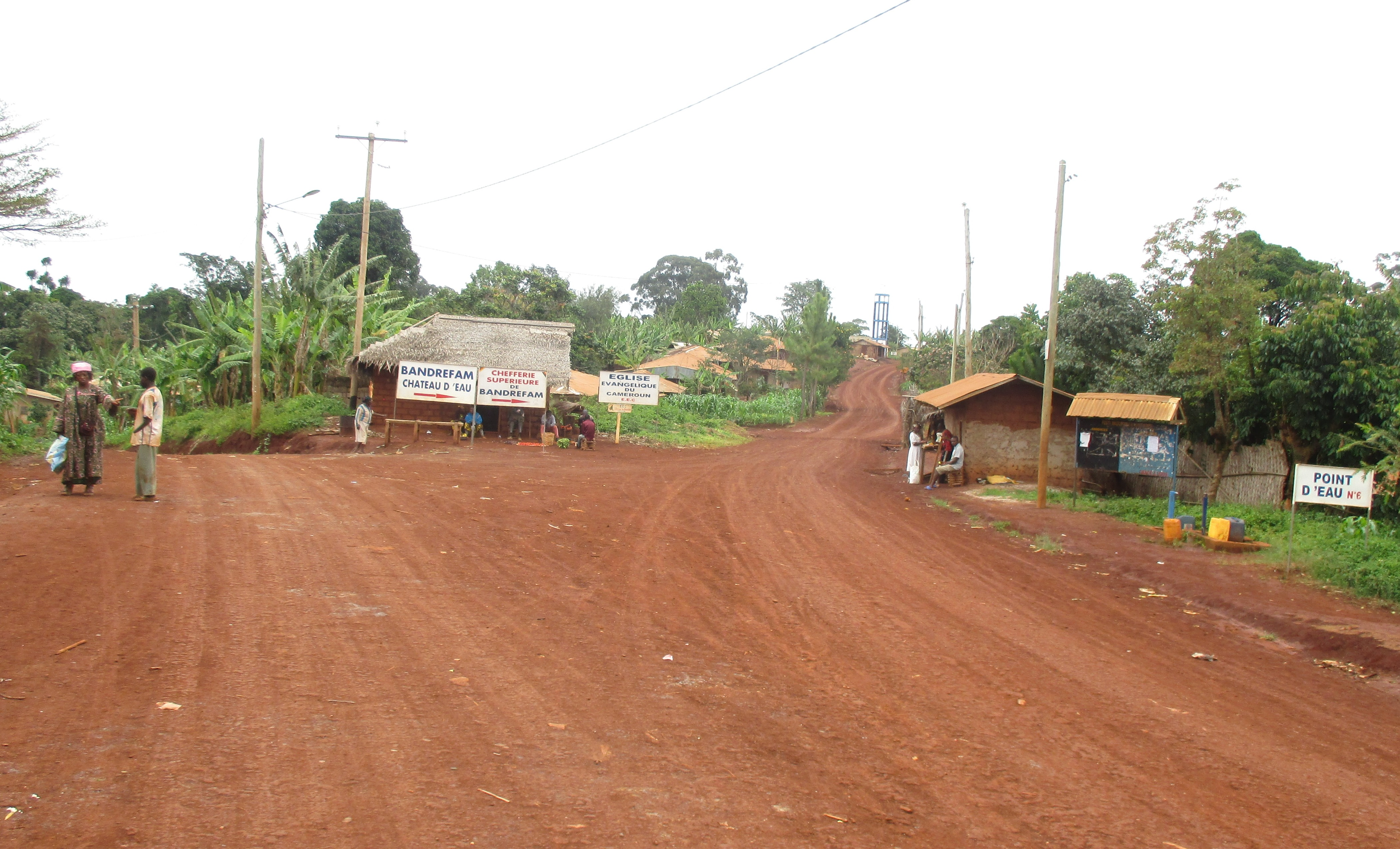
Downtown Bandrefam

== Language ==
Bandrefam is also a language and is part of the Bantu languages group, which in turn is part of the gigantic Niger–Congo languages family.

== Religion ==
Kouo'shi people are usually attached to ancestral practices: the cult of the dead. The sacred place or ancestral place of worship is called Koupmbâ, place where the "Shi" (God) is evoked and worshiped. "Shi Koupmbâ" (God of Koupmbâ or God of the sacred place) is the expression commonly used to invoke his presence in case of misfortune, happiness or simply during a meeting between individuals. It is not uncommon to hear the following expressions:“Shi Koupmba Tchop N’zog Mo.” Translation: God of Koupmba, have mercy on us. Or, “Shi Koupmba loo N’ji. "Translation: May the God of Koupmba accompany you.

A minority is either Christian or animist.Some churches got built, the main ones being the chapel of the Catholic Church and the parish of the Evangelistic Church of Cameroon.

== Economy ==
Subsistence farming, small livestock farming and handicraft are the main sources of income of the population. They generally grow peanuts, corn, potatoes, yam, manioc, plantain bananas but also small exploitations of substinence crops such as tomatoes, cabbage, watermelons, etc.

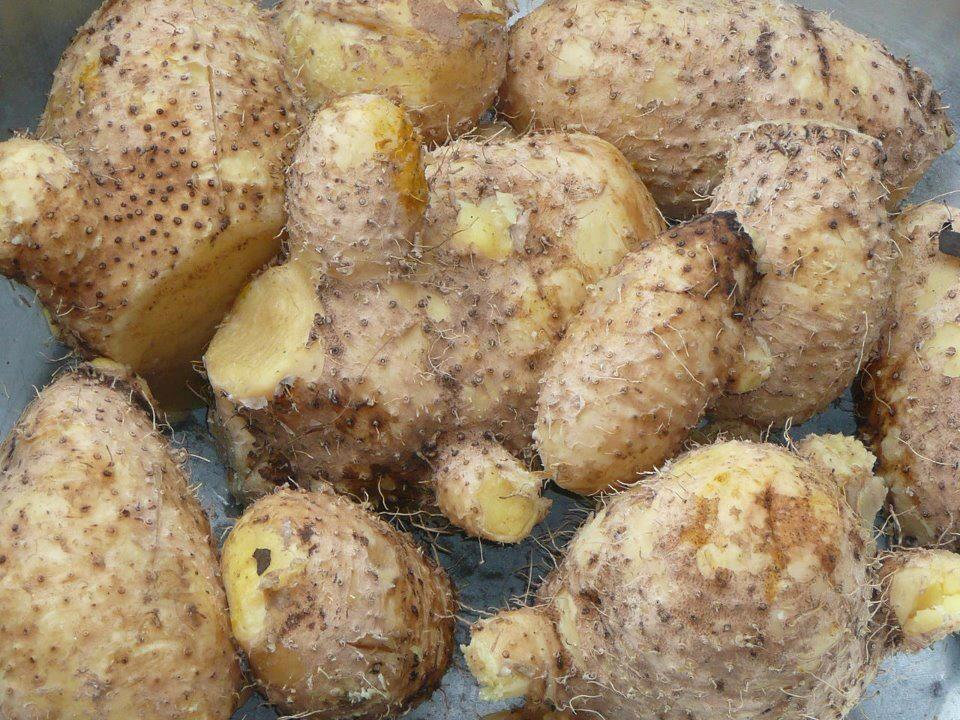
Yam-Bandrefam-Cameroon

They breed goats, sheep, and poultry for commercial purposes.
Farming Arabica coffee is also part of the agricultural activities.
Funerals is another significant commercial activity that create temporary jobs for unemployed people.
Bandrefam has a local market where villagers go to sell their products.

Since 2017, the international sustainable development network (Global Ecovillage Network), locally called “KOUO'SHI NDAMNZÙ” - which means “Kouo'shi of the future” or “Bandrefam of the future” - settled in the village in the Nka'ala neighborhood. Ecovillage locally processes the products of its plantations and resells them on the local and international market.

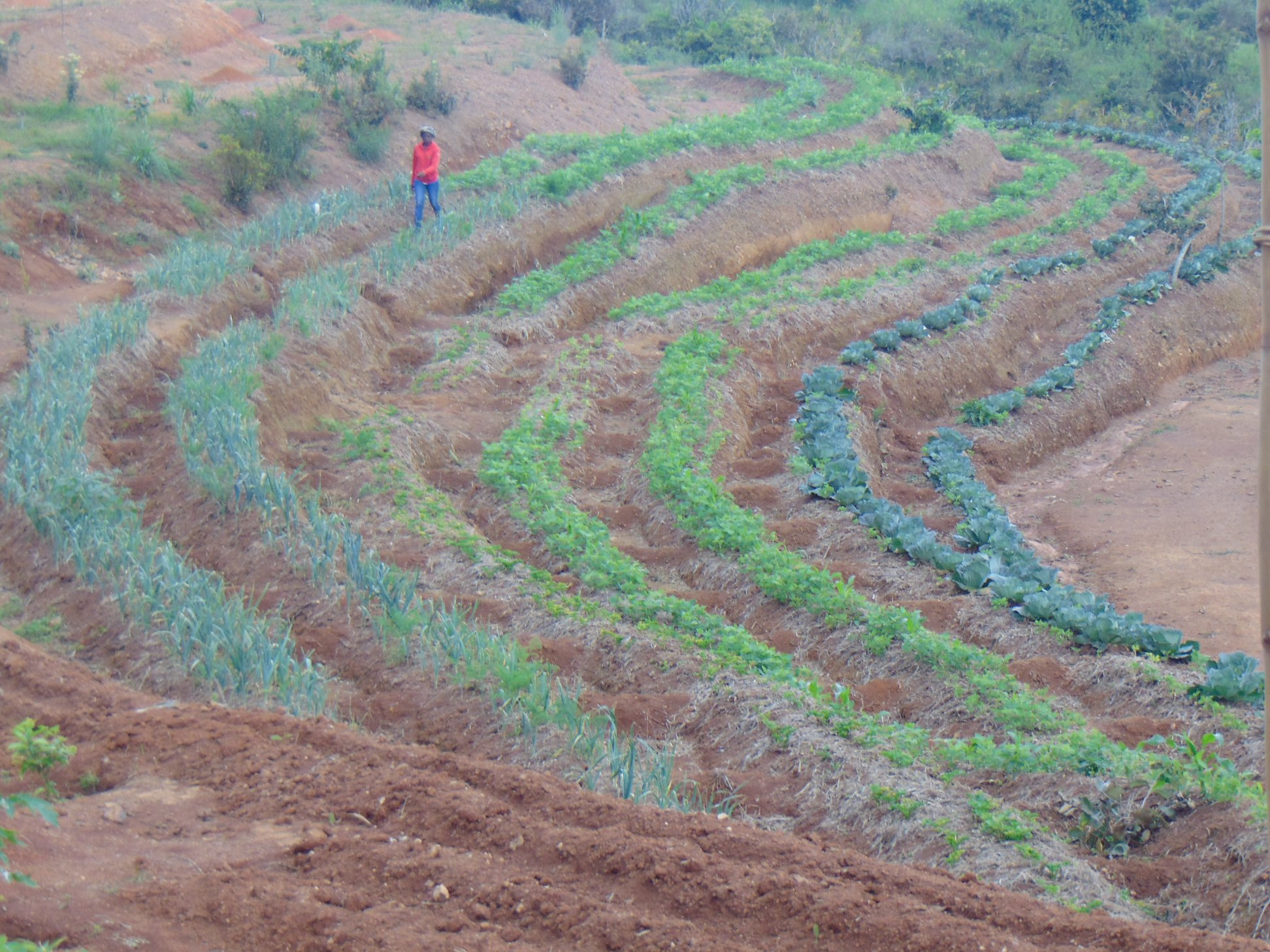
The Permaculture's Landscape-Bandrefam

This organization contributes significantly to improving the way of life of the inhabitants of the village. In addition to offering jobs to young graduates, it offers villagers training in sustainable agriculture and the use of computer tools for the youngest.

== Education ==
The school system of Bandrefam is completely public and depends on the Ministry of Education, regional commission of the West.It has: a nursery school, two primary schools and a technical and commercial education college (CETIC). For students wishing to pursue general education studies, they can go to either Kamna (about two kilometers North of the village in Bangoua) or Bangang Fokam (about one kilometer East of the village) where there is a secondary school for General Education.

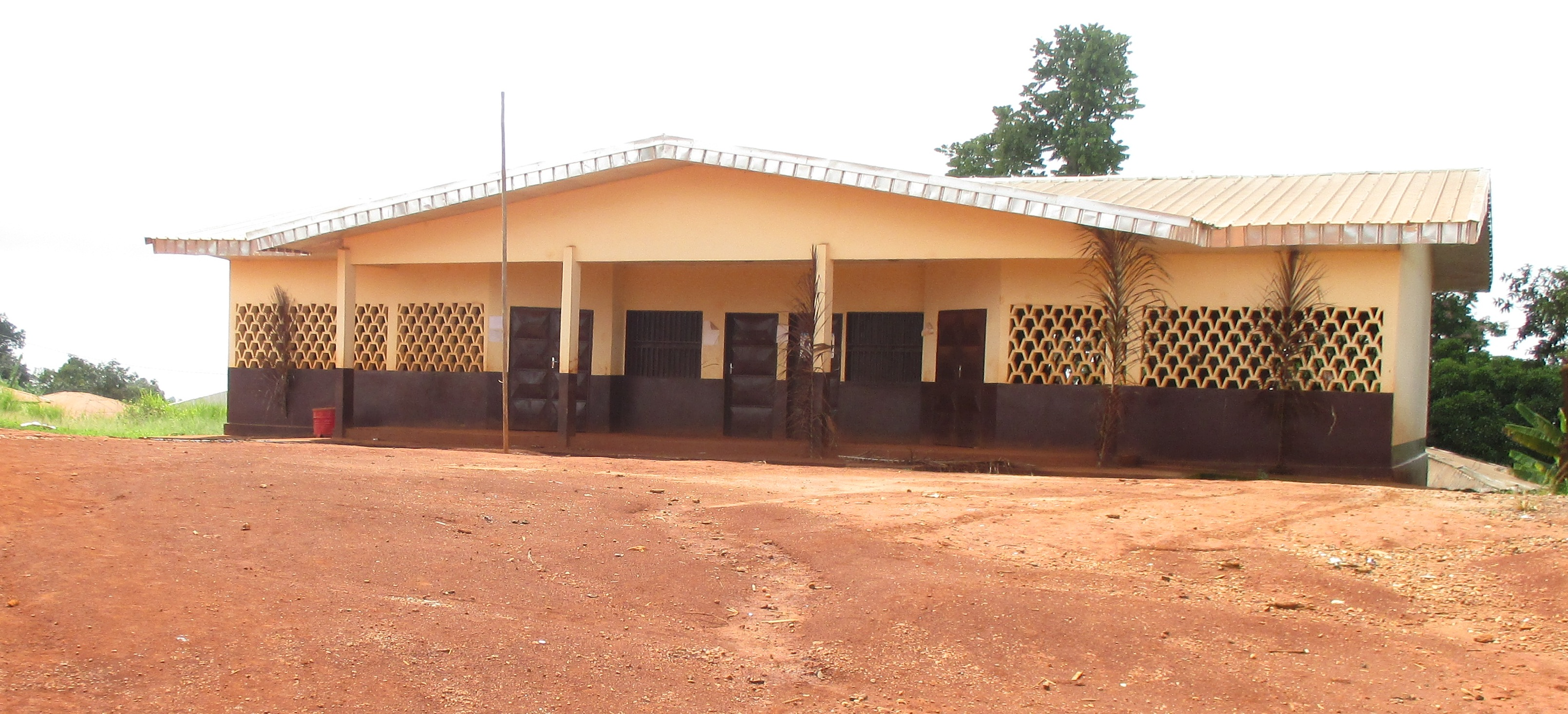
Nursery School in Bandrefam

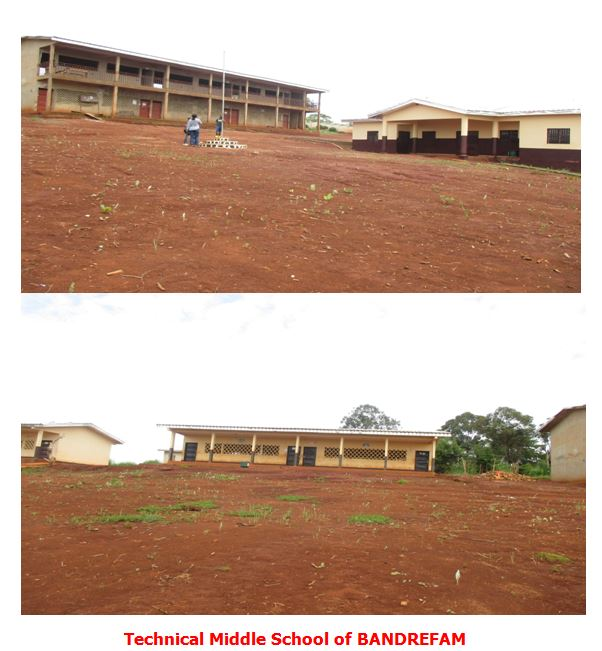
Technical school in Bandrefam

== Health ==
Bandrefam has an integrated health center where patients can receive first-aid. More serious cases are transferred to the Bafoussam regional hospital.

== Tourism and points of attraction ==
Visitors coming from Douala and entering from the South (through Kamna market) can see, from Lô’oshitô hill, a view of the green valley, including the full-size Bandrefam, with its scattered houses made of soil bricks and conical straw roofs.
Visible in the distance is the pasture land of Serkouò, interspersed with small cavernous rocky mountains, located about 3km from the chiefdom.
The archeological site of Kùog fiòg is located about 2km away from the chiefdom. It is built from granite blocks, carved several centuries ago. There sits the last remains of the Bana-Foumban road built by the Germans.

Before the fire of May 29, 1961 caused by the Ahidjo regime after independence and the looting that followed, the Bandrefam chiefdom was a very attractive cultural and tourist site teeming with a large number of sculptural objects. Nowadays, there are still some vestiges of these preserved art objects on display in front of the reception hall of the palace.

The work of bamboo, and the weaving of straw and reed are also attractions which will not escape the curiosity of the visitor.

== Infrastructure ==
The Bandrefam chiefdom is accessible by land. It is located not very far (about 4 km) from the national road number 4, connecting Yaoundé, the political capital of Cameroon and Bafoussam, the regional capital of the West.
It is crossed, from East to West, by the secondary road (D63) that connects Batié to Bagang- Fokam, via Bandenkop and Bangou. Some sections of this road are sealed but the stretch between national road 4 and Bandrefam has been chip sealed in 2023.
From Kamna market or from the Bayangam toll (on national road 4), visitors can take a cab or a motorbike taxi until the village.

== Cuisine ==
Koki with poyo banana, corn couscous with Nkùir, bean fritter with manioc stick, pistachio or peanut dish with manioc stick, plantain mixed with goat or beef meat (the dish is called Nkòndrè), taro with yellow sauce, crushed potatoes and black beans, form a typical popular menu. All this can be served with a palm or raffia wine.

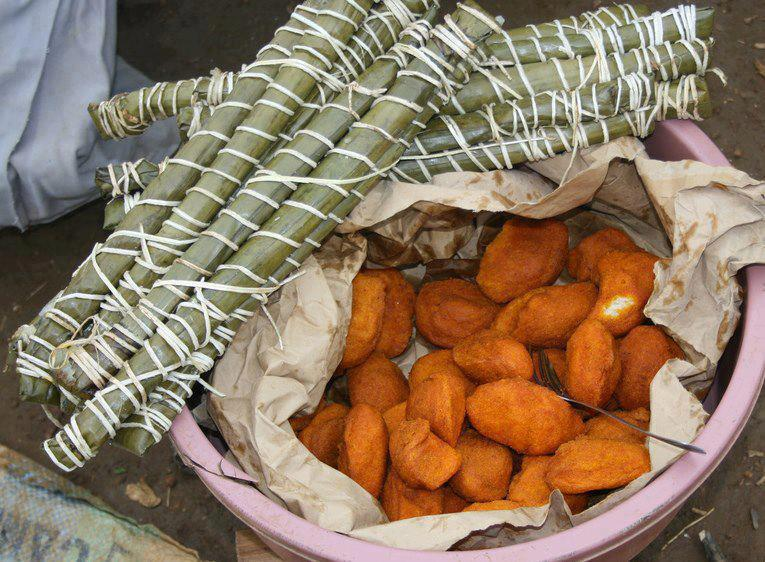
Miodo and fritters

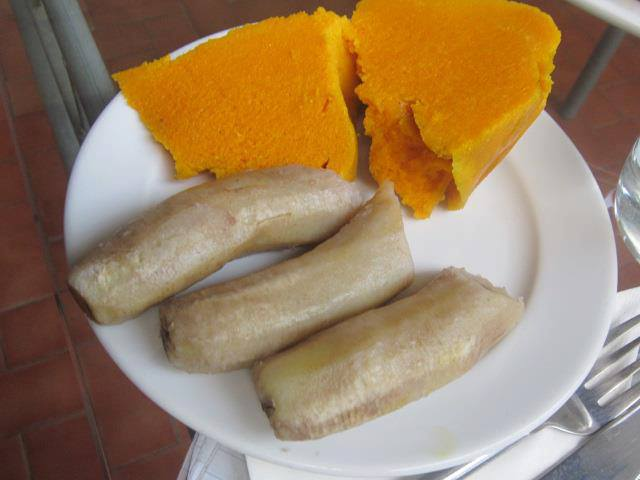
Koki banana poyo

== Dance and music ==
Méndoù and Methièu are the main dances usually performed during big ceremonies. Méndoù is a men’s dance, performed in a circle in the center of which the drum rolls and the balafon cadenced by the dancers’ songs make up the main symphony. It is usually a languid and sorrowful rhythm, probably as a reminder of the sad and painful memories from the past centuries. The white gandoura and the chéchia make up the dance uniform that offers an exuberant spectacle.

Methièu is a women’s dance, also performed in a circle in the center of which the lead singer gives the rhythm with her voice and her dance steps. All the other dancers join in unison. The dancers wear flowery loincloths and a small jingle bell around the ankle, the only musical instrument of the dance. With coordinated steps, these jingle bells make a harmonious tinkling sound, making the choreography very pleasant to watch. Here, the rhythm is more lively and cheerful. The songs are usually in honor of the dignitaries, children and benefactors of the kingdom. Women also sing the love of their fellows and peace between people.

The Nzouh or the royal dance which is practiced during the release of the new King from Laakam and the warrior dance Lali which is invariably practiced in times of war or peace (during funeral ceremonies for example) are other types of dances performed. in the kingdom, generally, by men.

== Life and Society ==
Sons and daughters native of Bandrefam but living outside the Kingdom gather in associations to join their efforts in order to help the development of their locality. Association for the Development of Bandrefam (ADEBA) and the association AGIR are two examples.

== Media and Communication ==
The kingdom receives TV and radio signals from the surrounding area.
CRTV and Canal 2 international are the main TV channels. Some homes also receive foreign channels thanks to satellite dishes.
FM 94, CRTV national radio, CRTV West region, Radio Venus, and Radio Batcham are broadcast in Bandrefam.
Cameroon Tribune, Ouest Echos, Le Messager, Mutations, Nouvelle Expression and Le Jour are the main newspapers from Bafoussam.

Telephone/Internet
Bandrefam is covered by mobile phone networks such as NEXTEL, MTN and Orange.
Internet is only available on mobile phones or portable WiFi through a modem. Visitors must go to Bafoussam (25 km away) to browse the web in a cyber-café.

== Notable people from Bandrefam ==
Mr Charles Tchoungang, Lawyer former President of the Cameroon bar association.
Elvis Kemayo, Musician and former Cameroon Radio-Television celebrity. Samuel Tchagoum, a business owner, CEO of Aston and Serena Hotels Marcelin Gansop, Award winning Journalist at Equinox TV Guillaume Piendjio Tchoupo, journalist at BTS/BTM/STV Martin Koums, Musical artist

Gallery

== Gallery ==
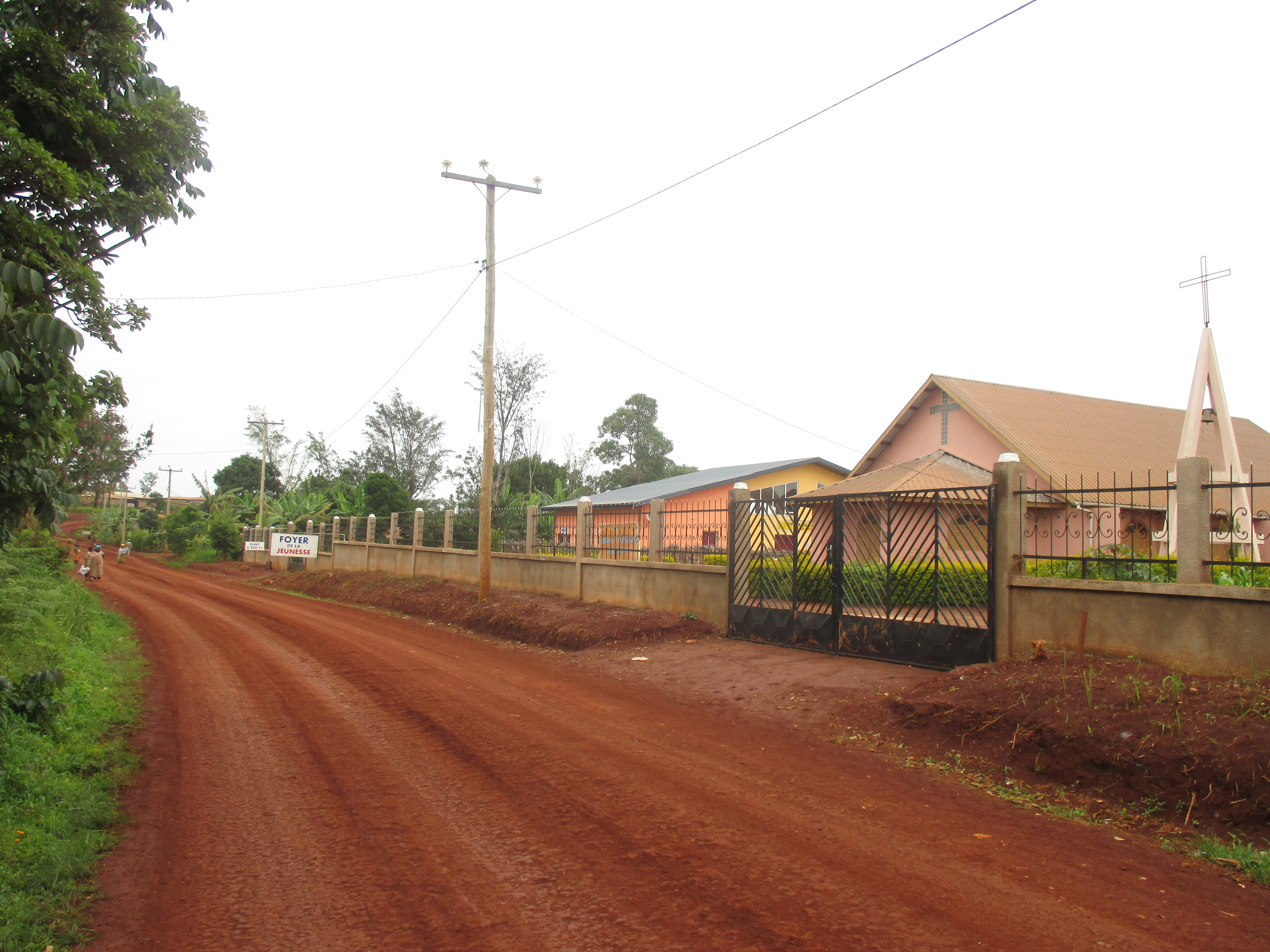
The regional route (D63) as a dirt road in 2015.

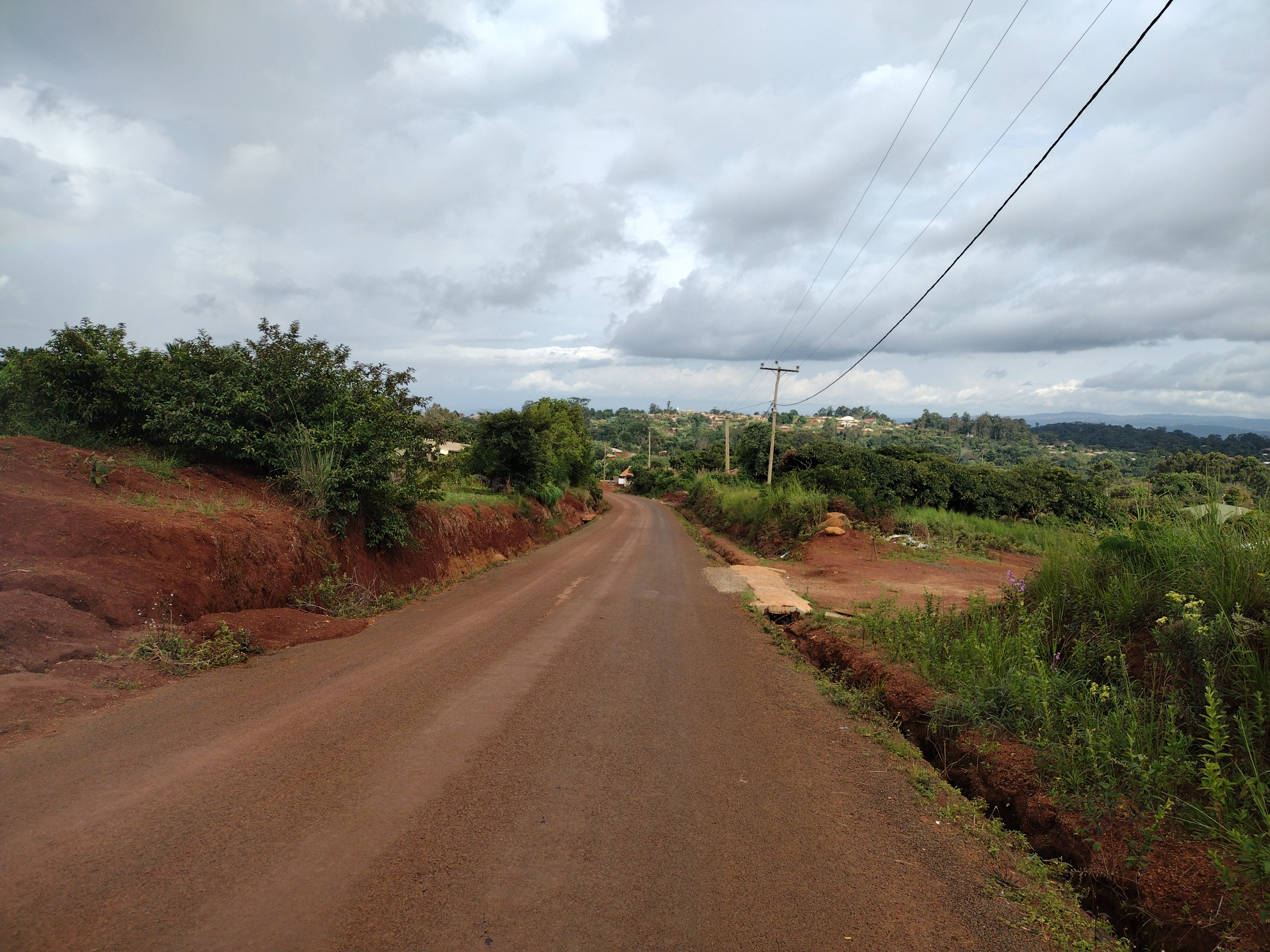
The same stretch of road after being graveled (2026).

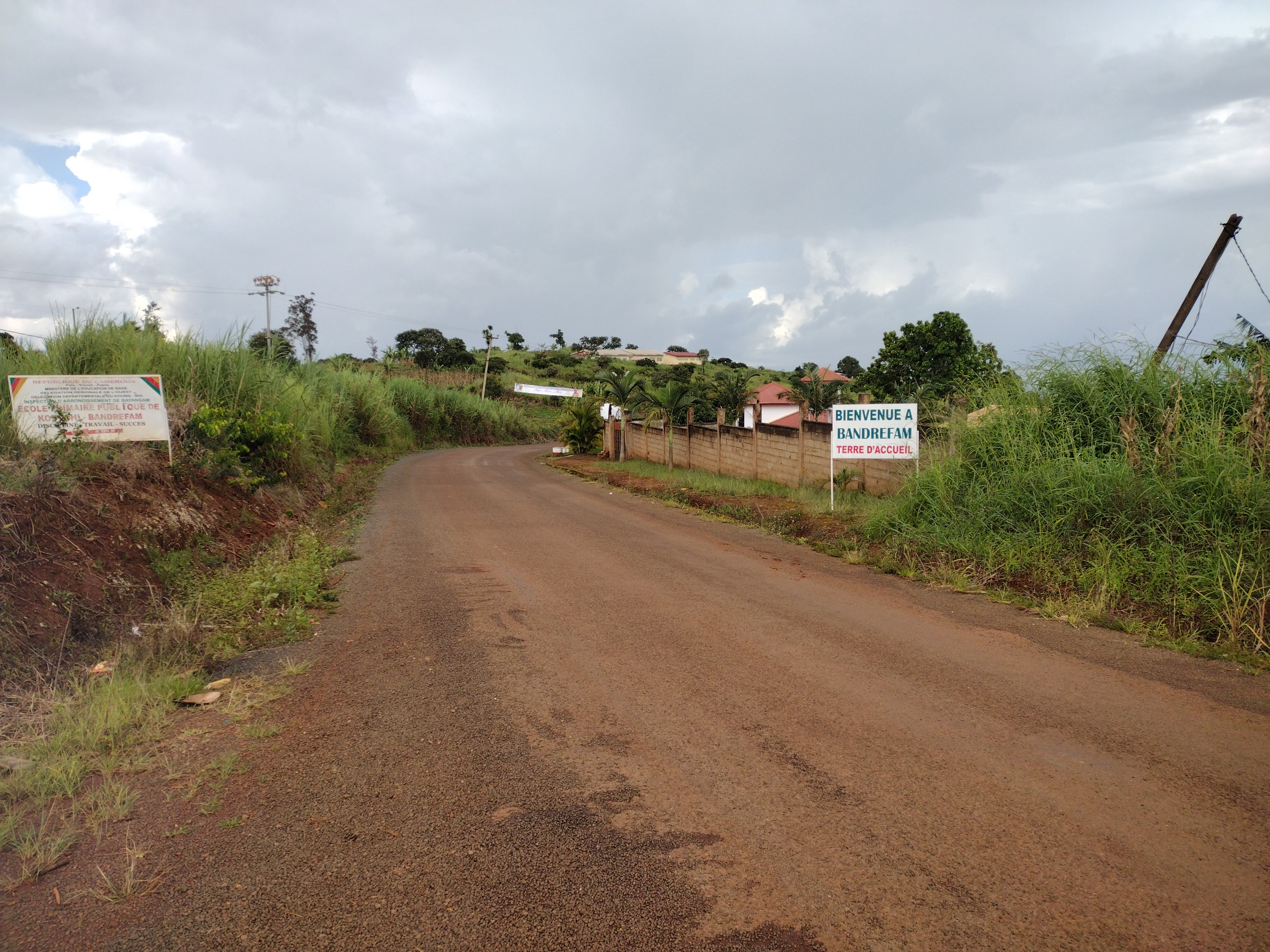
The main entrance to the village.

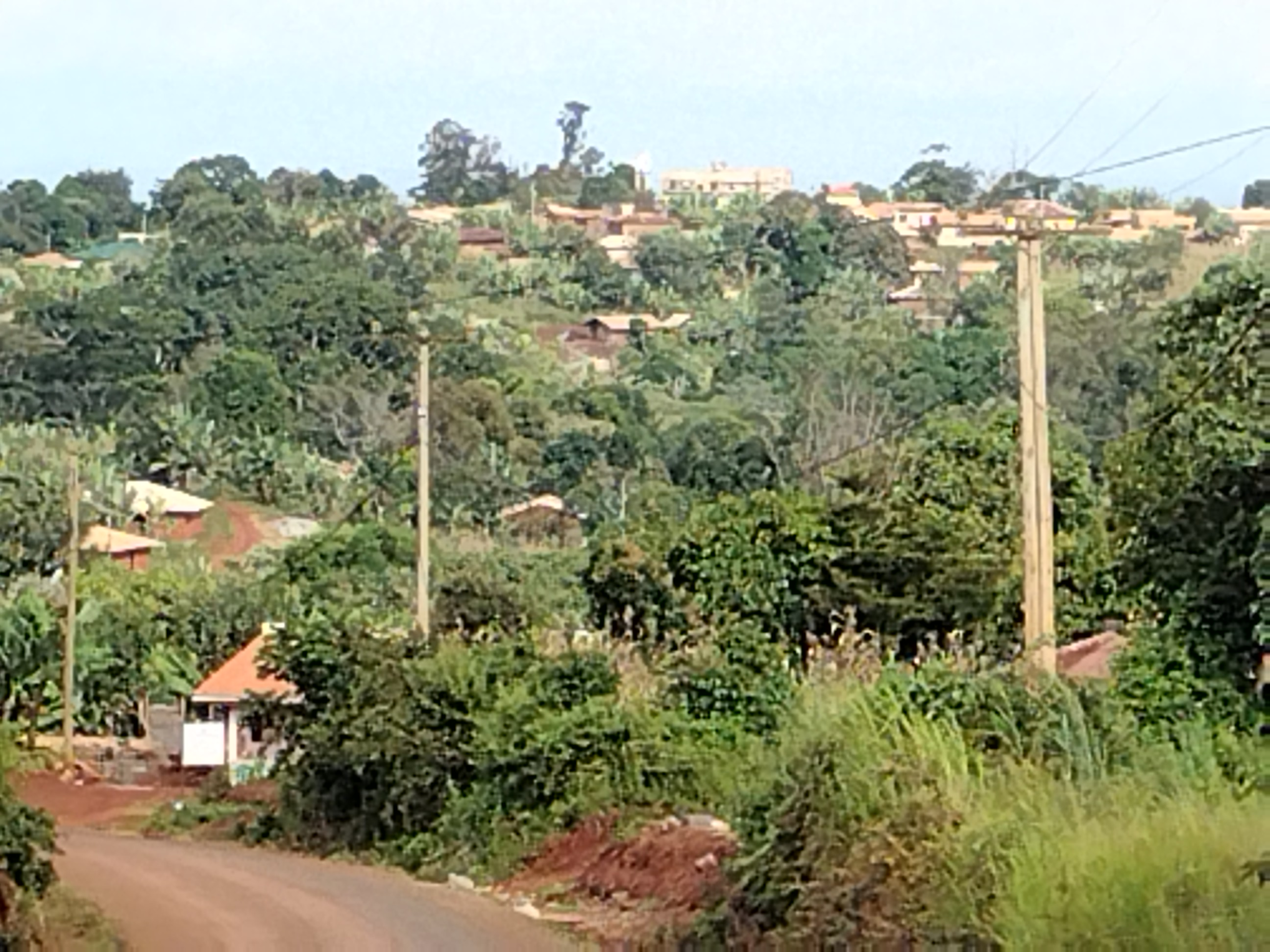
Panoramic view of the village from Lorshitoo hill.

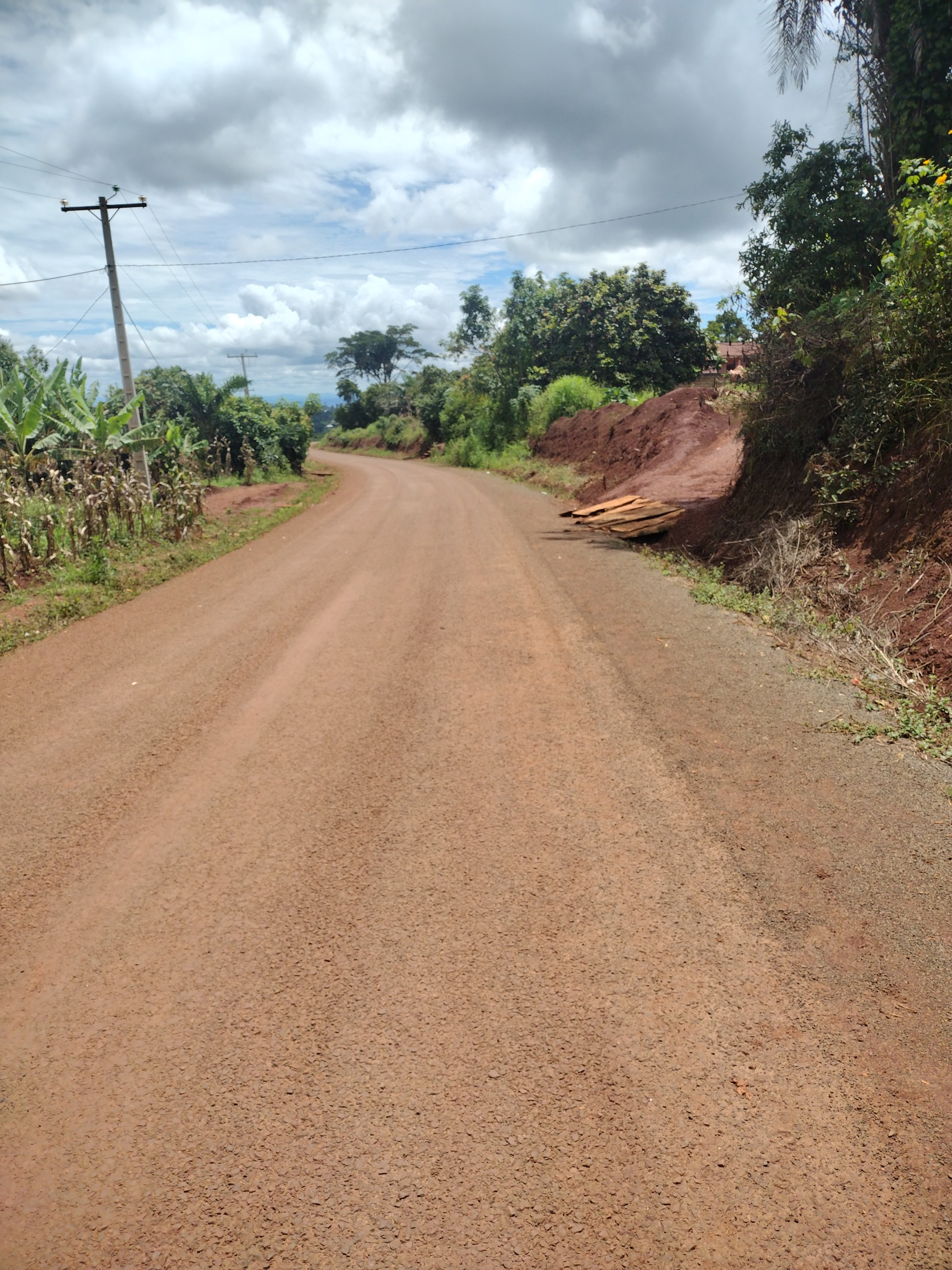
The D63 route heading towards Bangang Fokam.

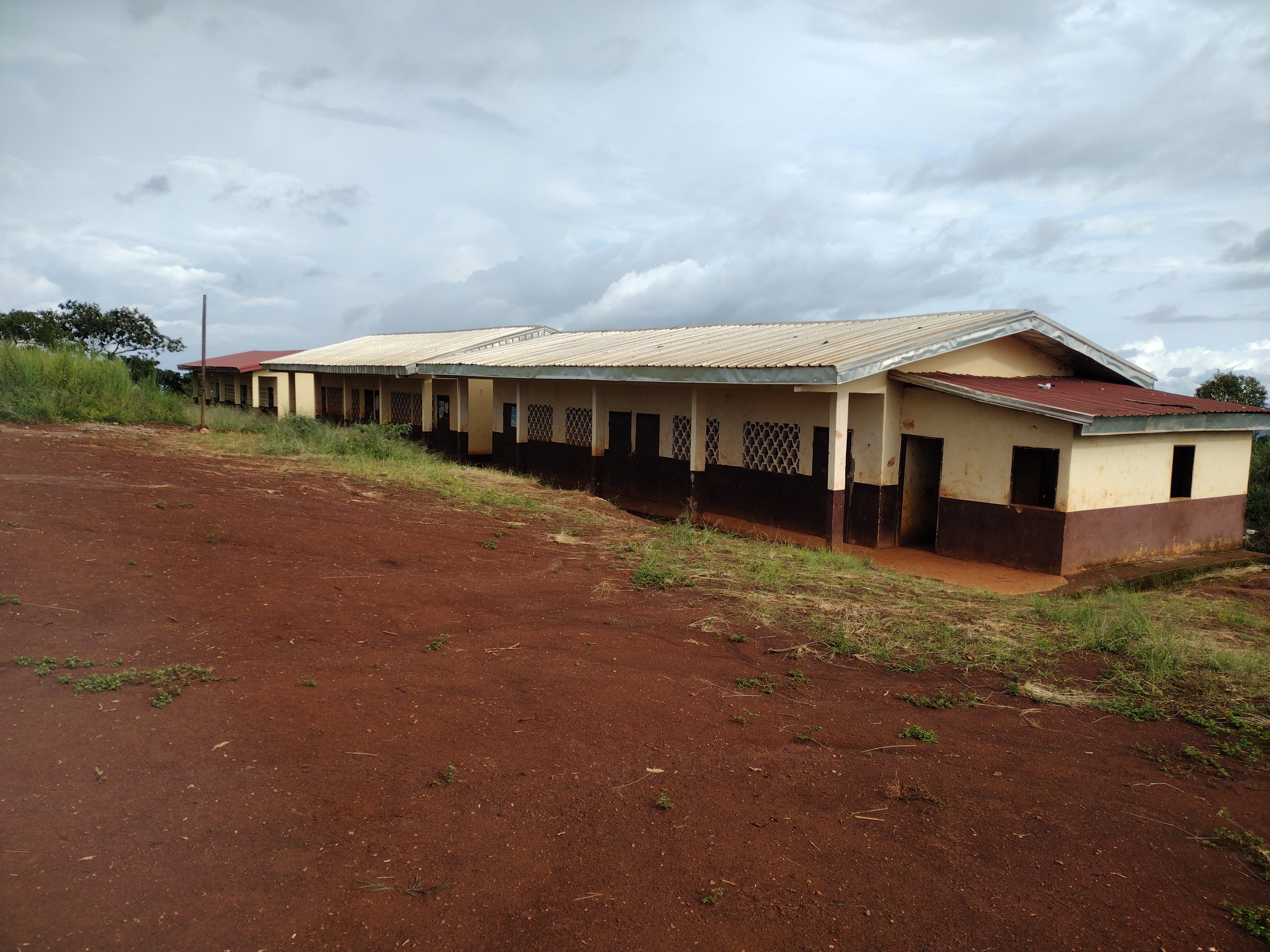
Public school infrastructure in Bandrefam.
