= Njé Mo Yé =

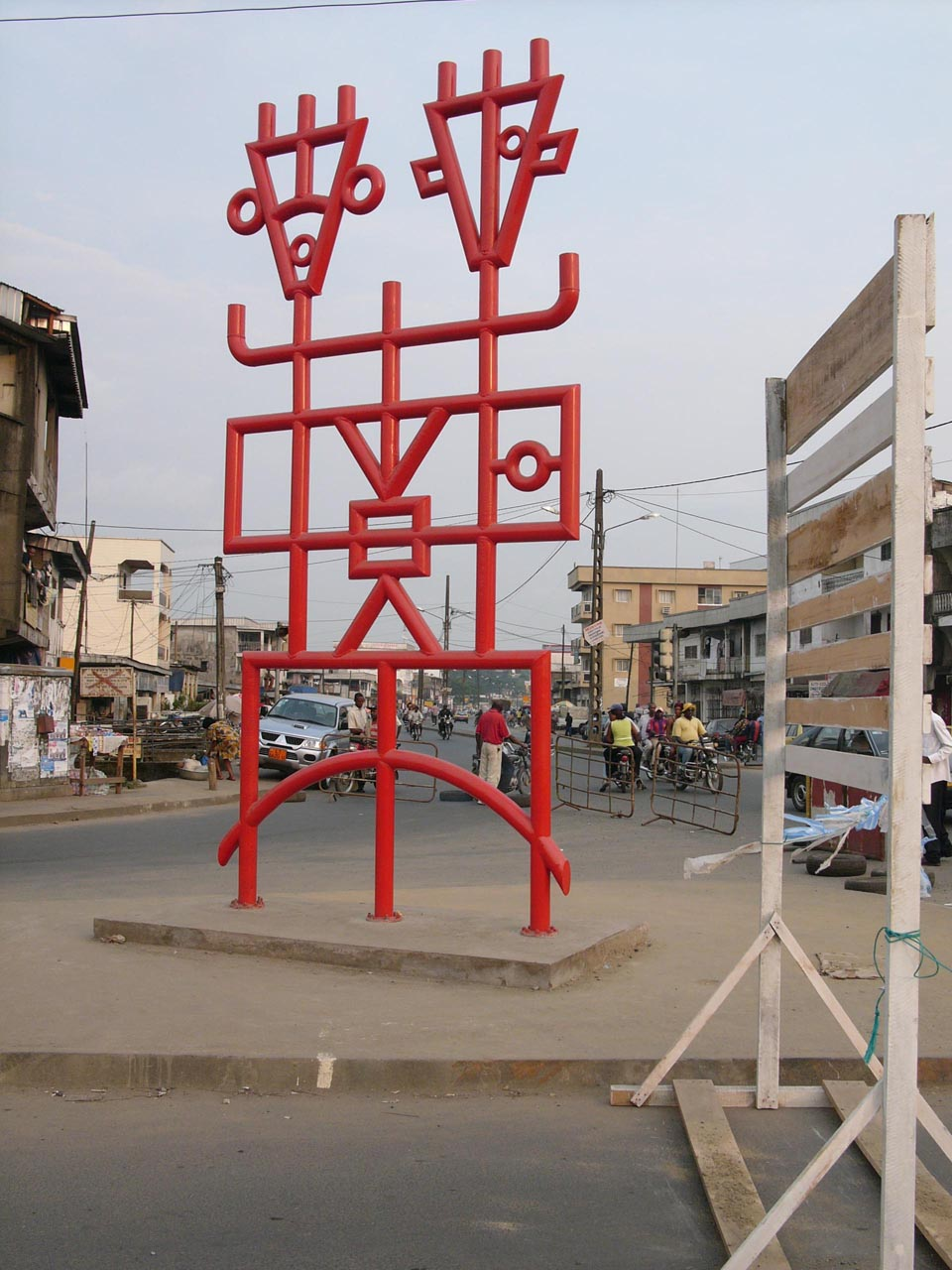
- Artist: Koko Komégné
- Year: 2005
- Dimensions: 5 m × 2,5 m (200 in × 980 in)
- Location: Dernier poteau, New Bell Douala, Cameroon; 4.0329°N 9.748°E

Njé Mo Yé, Which means “what's that?” in Douala language, is a permanent sculpture located in Douala (Cameroon). It was created by Koko Komégné and inaugurated in 2007.

== The artwork ==
Realized in tubes of painted iron 12 centimeters in diameter, Njé Mo Yé, which means what’s that? in the language of Douala, is a sculpture that represents and glorifies the couple.

The artist, Koko Komégné, who lived in the neighborhood of Dernier Poteau in Nkololoun from 1966 until 1984, remembers that at that time, this place marked an extremity of the city. He wished to testify his childhood gratitude by offering the sculpture on this site.

The sculpture is 5 meters high for a wingspan of 2,5 meters. It was inaugurated during the Salon Urbain de Douala SUD 2007.

in 2013 the Municipality of Douala, after a car accident that damaged the artwork, financed the restoration and repainting.

== See also ==
=== Bibliography ===
- Pensa, Iolanda (Ed.) 2017. Public Art in Africa. Art et transformations urbaines à Douala /// Art and Urban Transformations in Douala. Genève: Metis Presses. ISBN 978-2-94-0563-16-6
- Babina, L., and Douala Bell, M. (eds.). (2007): Douala in Translation. A View of the City and Its Creative Transformative Potentials, Rotterdam, Episode Publishers.
- Fokoua, S. O. (2012): «Doual’art. L’art dans la cité », Inter: Art actuel, n°111, p. 61-61.
- Verschuren, K., X. Nibbeling and L. Grandin. (2012): Making Douala 2007-2103, Rotterdam, ICU art project.
- Pensa, I. (2012): «Public Art and Urban Change in Douala». In Domus, [7 April 2012). http://www.domusweb.it/en/art/2012/04/09/public-art-and-urban-change-in-douala.html
- Marta Pucciarelli (2014) Final Report. University of Applied Sciences and Arts of Southern Switzerland, Laboratory of visual culture.

=== Related articles ===
- List of public art in Douala
- Contemporary African art
