= Bandjoun =

- Commune
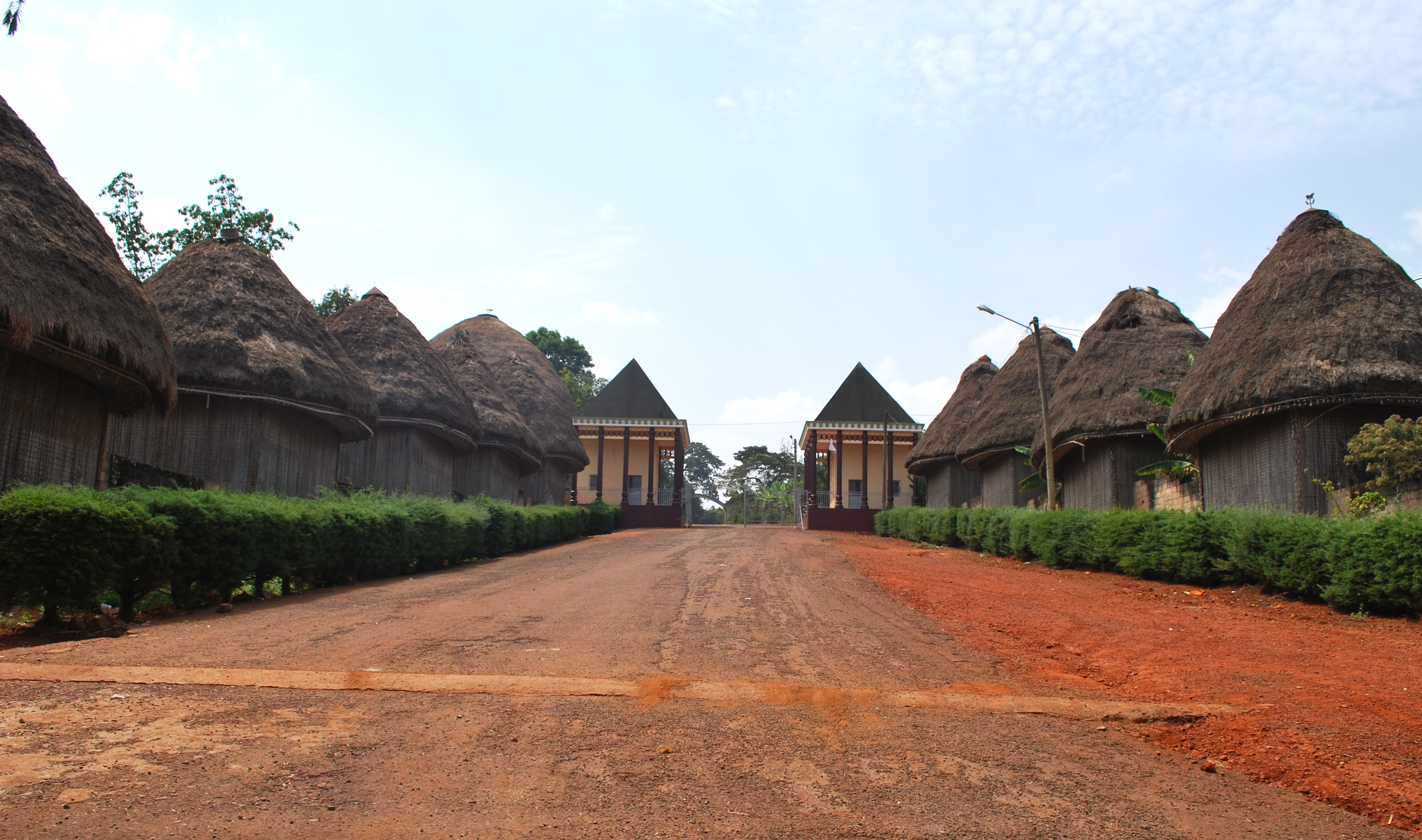

- Location in Cameroon
- Coordinates: 5°21′N 10°24′E
- Country: Cameroon
- Region: West Region
- Department: Koung-Khi
- Foundation: 1570

Government
  - Mayor: Fotso Victor (Fo Niapjouong)

Area
  - Total: 106 sq mi (274 km^{2})
- Elevation: 5,020 ft (1,530 m)

Population (2012)
  - Total: 6,872
- Time zone: UTC1 (Africa/Douala)

Bandjoun (La 'Djo in local language) is a town and commune in the Koung-Khi Department in the West Region of Cameroon. Bandjoun is also the capital of the Koung-Khi department and one of the largest traditional chefferie (chiefdom) in Bamiléké country. The chief dwells in Hialah, and has many wives.

Its inhabitants speak Ghomala' or Bandjoun which is one of the Bamiléké family of languages.

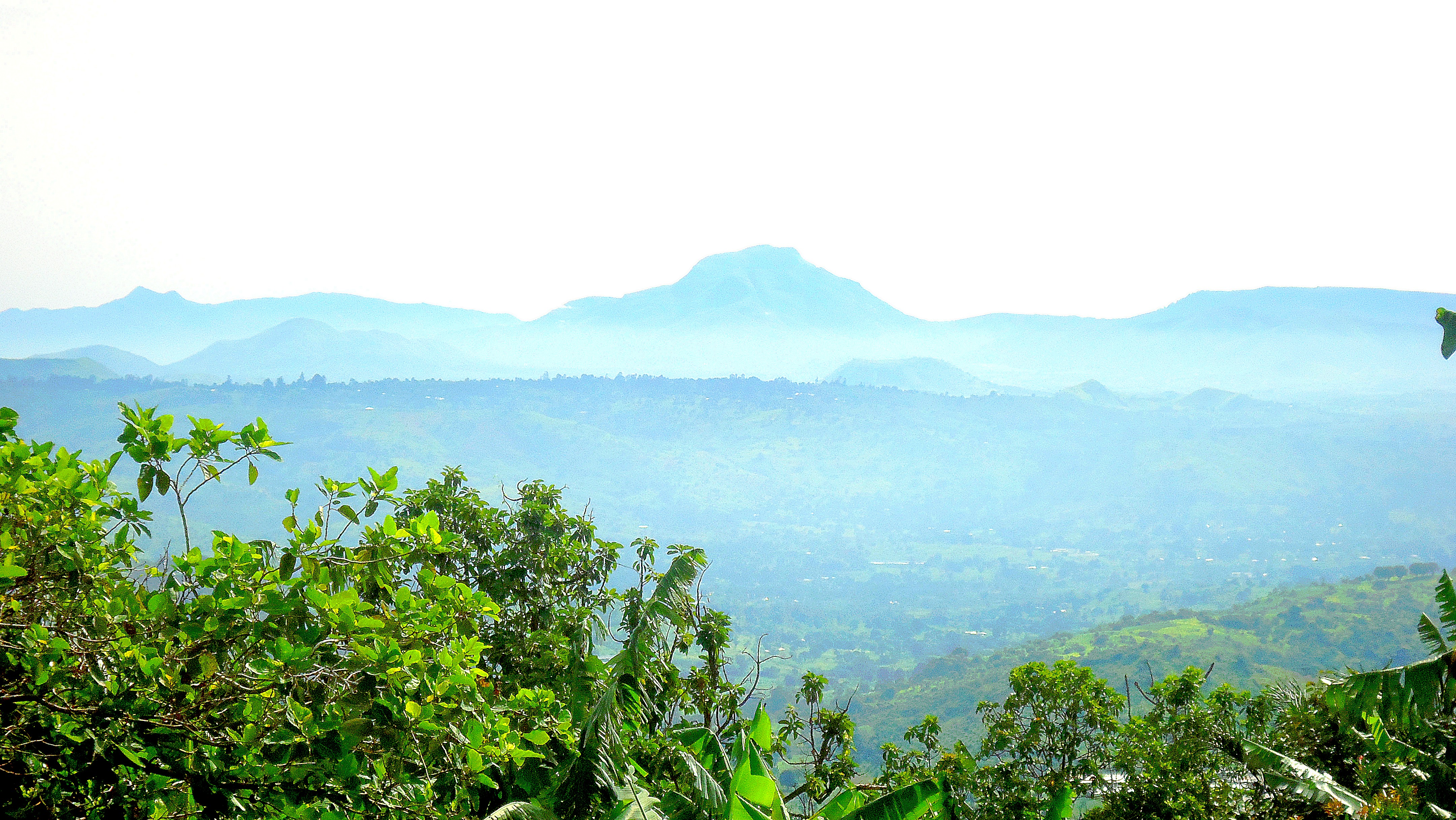
Bandjoun Landscape

== Geography ==
Bandjoun is located some 10 km south of Bafoussam and some 230 km north-east of Douala. Access to the municipality is by the N4 road from Bafoussam, which passes through the municipality and then goes south-east to Bayangam. The N5 road branches from the N4 in the municipality and goes south-west to Batié. The Route Bangou also branches from the N4 in the municipality and goes south through the town to Bangou.

== History ==
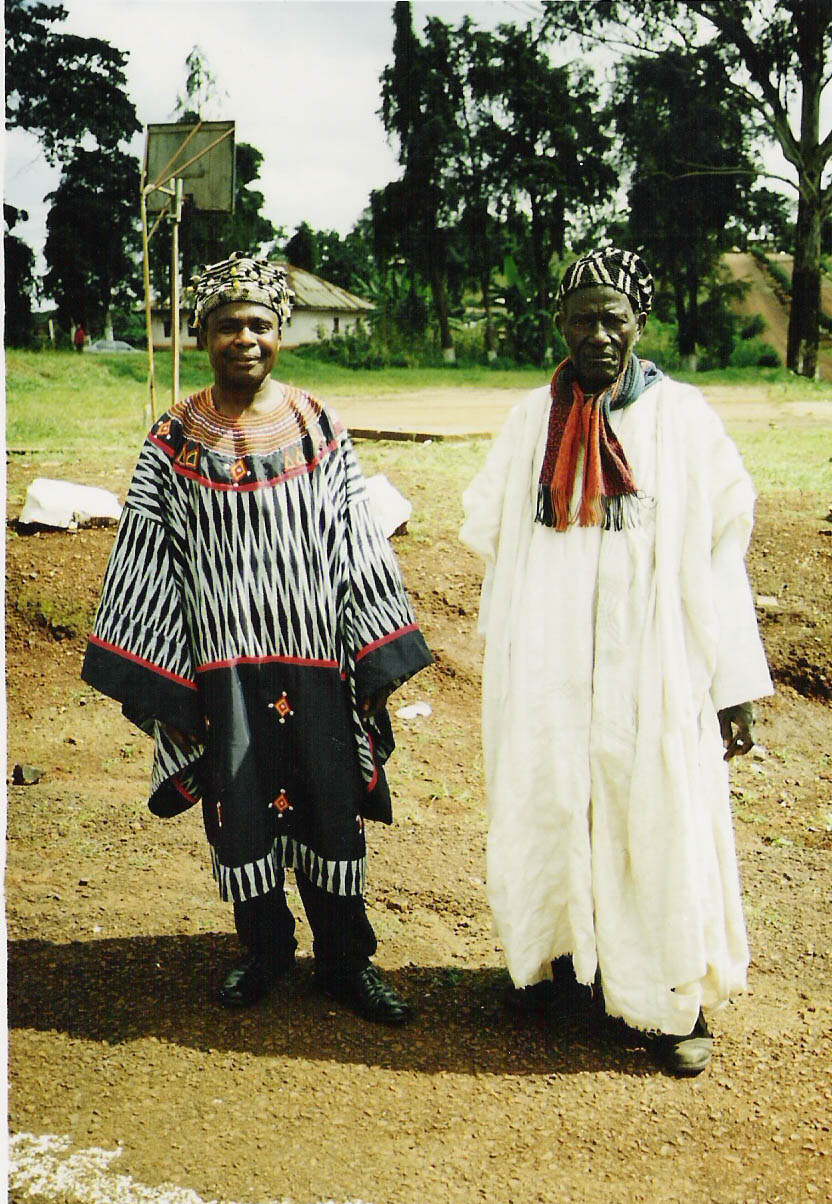
Bandjoun locals

A house in Bandjoun

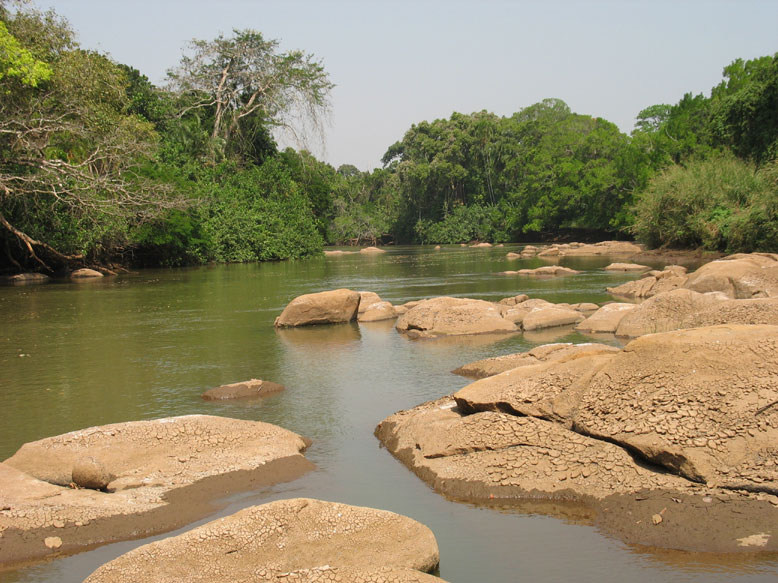
The Noun River

The recent history of the Bandjoun people is relatively well-known today. Recent history, however, covers only the last two centuries. Further research on the prehistory of the village Bandjoun is needed. Some existing chronologies cite the foundation of Bandjoun village in the 14th and 15th centuries under the Royal Magistracy of Notchwegom (1525 according to some sources but probably in 1570).

It is now established that King Foudoup was the first King of Baleng who reigned between 1545 and 1573. King Fodoup had difficulty in reconciling his first two sons Tchoungafo and Notchwegom about who would succeed him at his death. He openly expressed a preference for Tchoungafo to which Notchwegom took great umbrage and decided to leave the village of his father to found his own village below in the Noun Valley. Taking care to avoid irritating small chiefdoms that existed in the area, he moved to the edge of the last village where he could finally find free land. It was at the current location of Famleng.

After installing the first encampment at Bandjoun, Notchwegom quickly disappeared. His first wife, with whom he had already had a young son barely a teenager (11 years old according to some), sought the protection of his stepfather until her son, Du'gnechom, would be old enough to succeed his father. King Foudoup used this opportunity to reconcile posthumously with his son by fully supporting his wife and introducing her little son to the art of building royal power.

Du'gnechom in turn, once he was a young adult, became leader of the camp set up by his father at Famleng and quickly developed the qualities of a great hunter and leader. He then married a young woman his mother had prepared for him who quickly gave him a son who he named Notouom. Having taken steps to expand his military to develop his hegemonic pretensions, he instructed his son on his intentions and introduced him to war strategies. Du'gnechom died probably in 1589 when his son Notouom was only 19. Notouom was the first real first level king of Bandjoun and he worked to achieve his father's objectives and expand the village of Bandjoun.

King Foudoup was succeeded by his son Tchoungafo who, in turn, reigned from 1573 to 1628. Tchoungafo installed and inducted Notouom I in 1589 to the Bandjoun throne. He was assured of that office as the successor to his father who was the founder of Bandjoun.

During the long reign of Notouom, which lasted until 1641, he worked to increase the population of Bandjoun by buying all that he could acquire (cattle, food, valuables, and slaves whom he freed to integrate them into his kingdom). It was under his royal magistracy that the name Bandjoun originated with the term Pa Djo meaning "those who buy". Very expansionary, he made all the smaller heads of villages vassals and modernised his kingdom administratively and militarily. He created administrative districts called Djie.

After transferring the seat of the Kingdom of Famleng to Hiala, he stood at the head of the seven districts which were similar to Duchies with a kind of non-feudal Duke called Kemdjie whose sole mission was to monitor the Duchy and pass information collected to the Minister of the Interior called Nwalah Kah. These divisions are still in force today with Famleng, for example, in the district of Djiesse.

There was also a Prime Minister called Nwalah Sissi. He handled all the affairs of the Kingdom and its diplomatic ties.

The Grand venerator exhibited remarkable piety towards God that materialised through the "Si Notouom", a shrine located at Famleng.

The above version of history of Bandjoun was composed based on a comparative historical methodology. Theories that place the founding of Bandjoun before the 16th century are not credible. Research undertaken by historians about the history of the village of Baleng allow the placement of the origins of the village of Bandjoun with less uncertainty.

Notouom I was succeeded by his son Notouom II who consolidated the achievements of the kingdom of his father and strengthened the prestige of Bandjoun in the region. His reign was also long, as well as that of his successor Notouom III.

Since 1589 the enthronement ceremony of the King of Bandjoun is conducted under the patronage of the powerful King of Baleng. The enthronement of the King of Baleng is also conducted under the high magistracy of King Bandjoun. For example, the last enthronement of the new King of Baleng in 2013 was under the powerful patronage of His Majesty Djomo, King of Bandjoun, at the village of Baleng.

In the 18th century an attempt at invasion of Banfjoun was made by the armies of the Sultan of Bamun but it ended in a complete military debacle for Bamun and the Sultan was pursued and besieged at Foumban by King Kamga I who forced him to sign an armistice treaty.

== The Chefferie or Chiefdom of Bandjoun ==
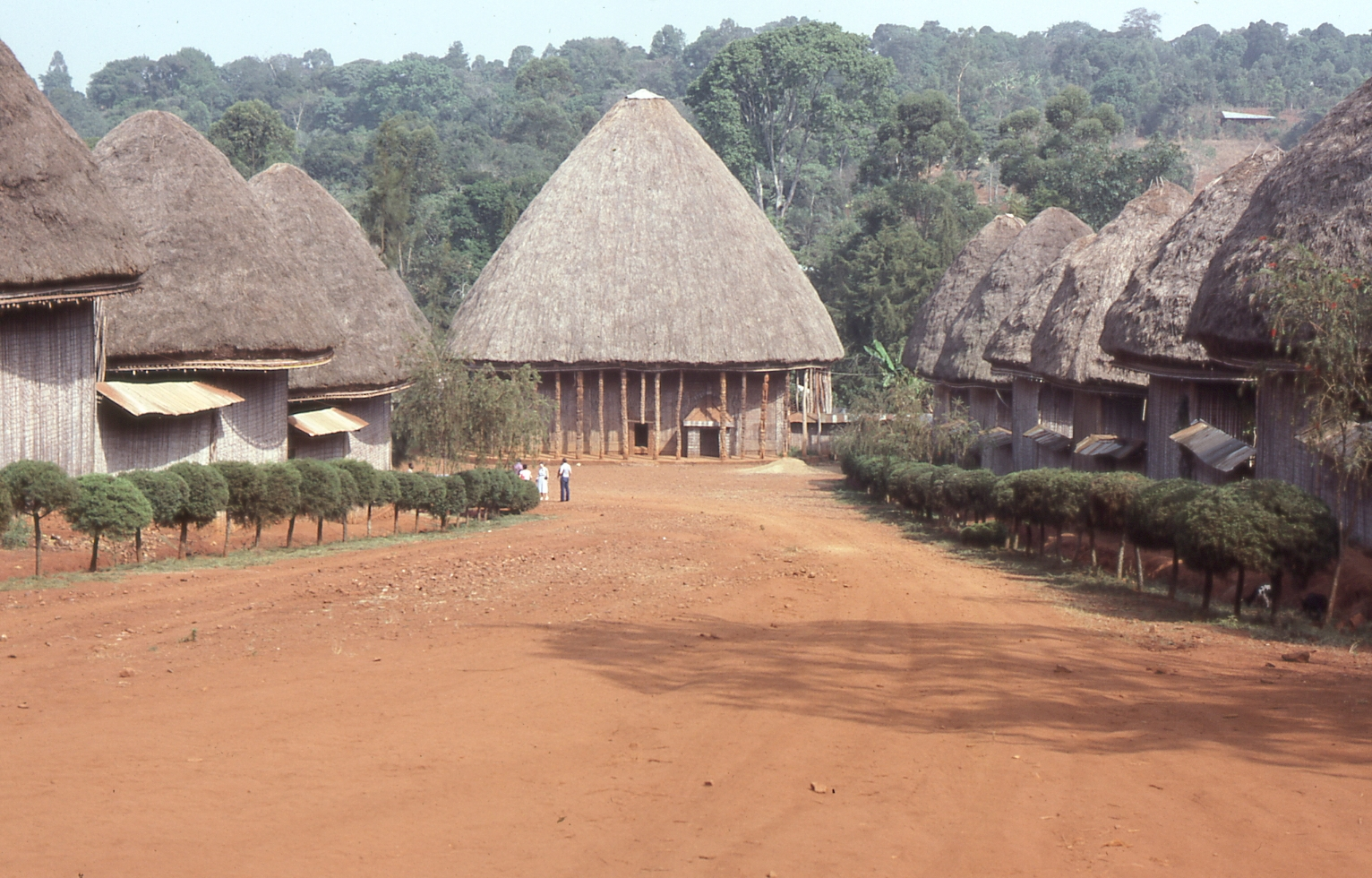
The Bandjoun Chefferie

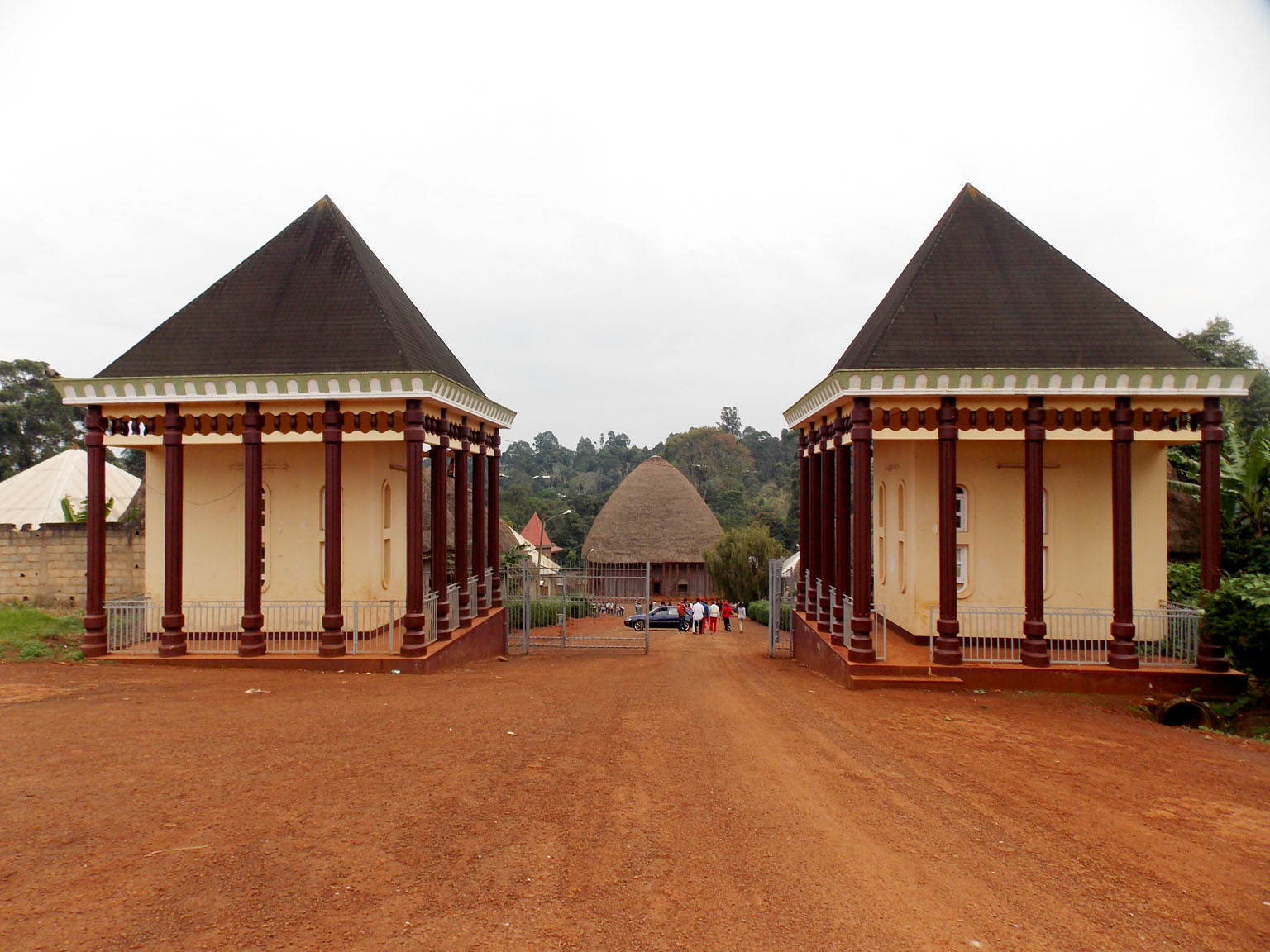
The main entrance to the Chefferie

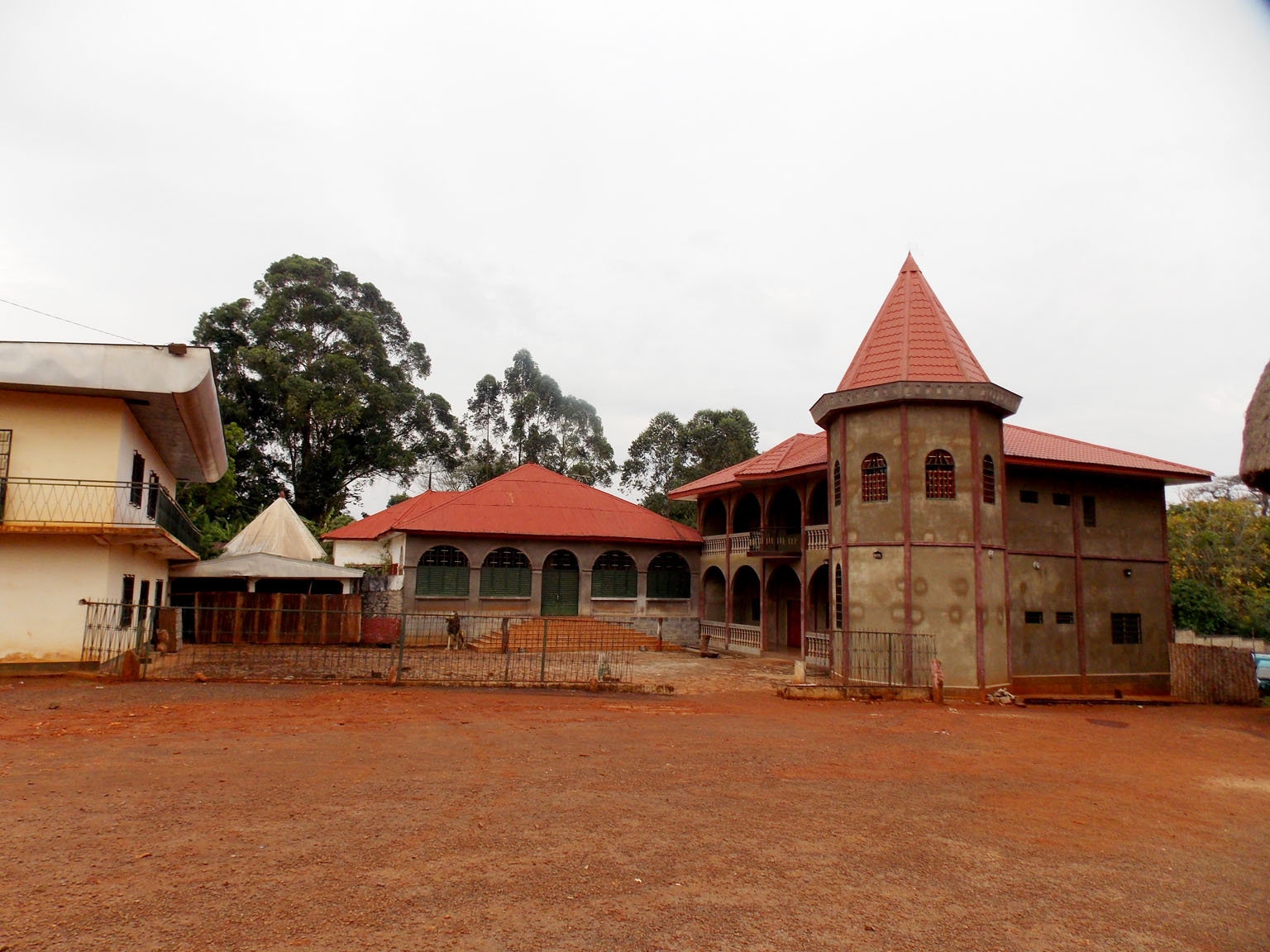
The Residence of King Kamga

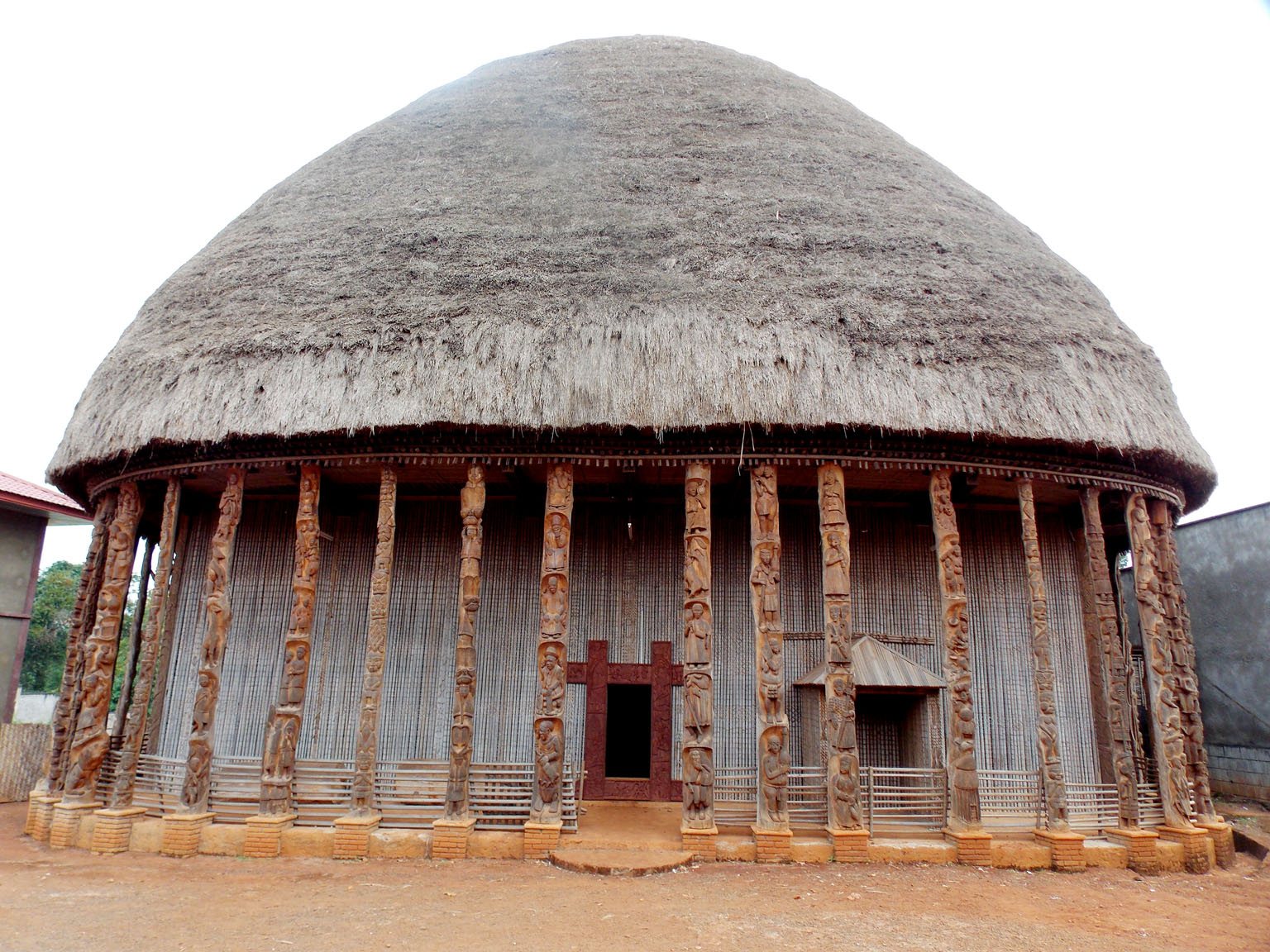
Main Symbol of Bandjoun

20 km south-east of Bafoussam on the N4 road to Bagangté is the Chefferie (Chiefdom headquarters) of Bandjoun. There are winding paths bordered by fences enclosing banana trees leading to a succession of traditional huts aligned with and supported by carved wooden pillars and colonnades surrounding the habitat.

The large hut measures 17 metres high and was once the residence of the Chief. It was built by King Notouom I about four centuries ago. Since then it has been regularly restored. Its attic is used as a granary for reserves of wood, peanuts and corn as with other huts. The hut contains 3 rooms and a meeting room decorated with lion skins - symbol of the Chief, panther skins - symbol of great nobles, and doors with engravings of lizards - symbol of lower notables. The hut is supported by carved pillars with those in the middle the oldest, having survived three fires that occurred in the chiefdom.

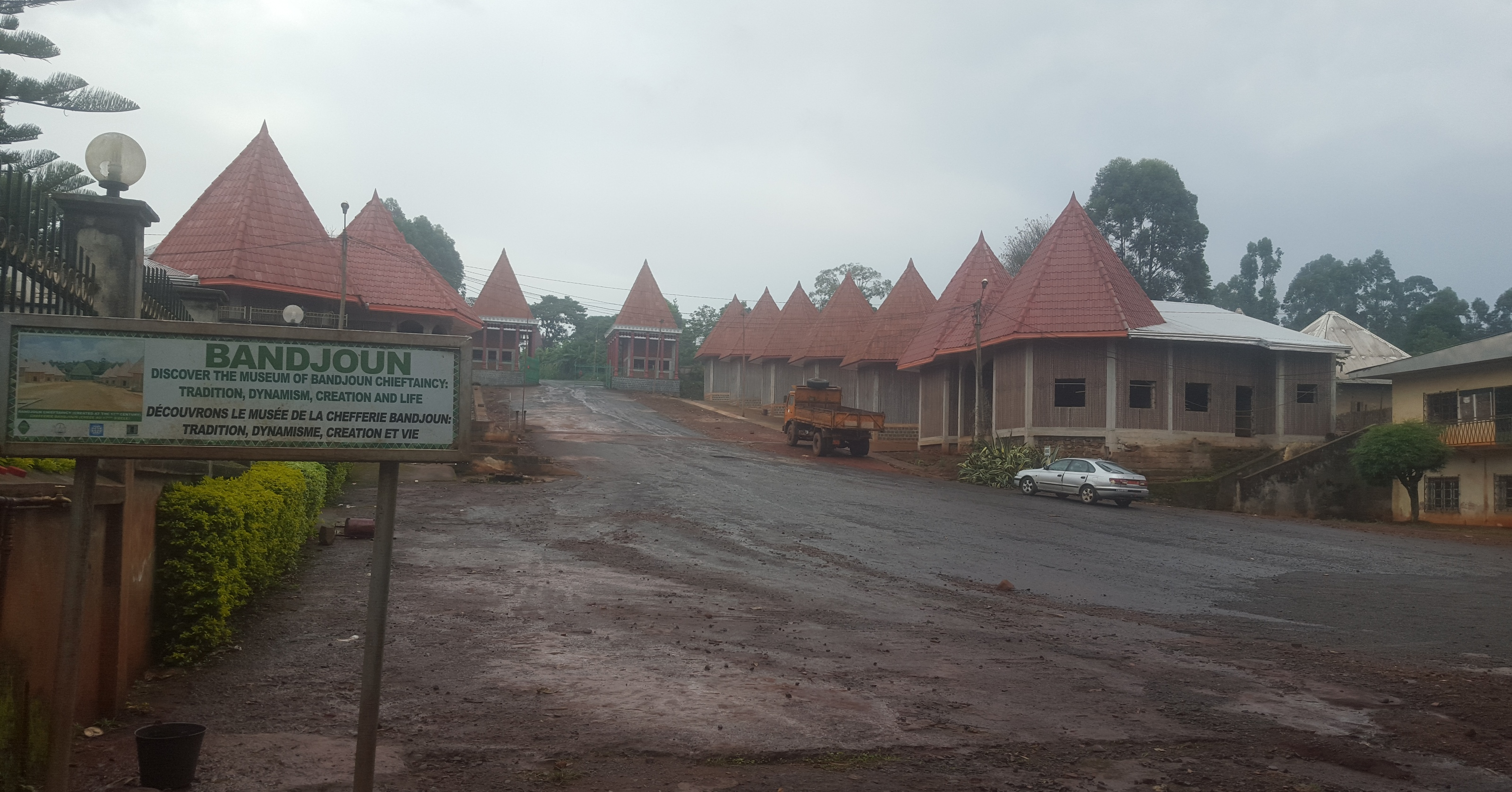
Bandjoun Palace

The structure of the chiefdom resembles to the huts of the nobles with a peaked roof and number of points depending on the hierarchy. The main entrance leads to the large hut and the women's huts are located on both sides of the path. Women on one side are led by the first wife, who is also called "Nkoung", and those on the other side by "Djuikam", the wife of the King's predecessor who he takes during initiation.

The facades are made of bamboo interwoven with plant fibres with some featuring geometric patterns. The doors are framed with carved panels are elevated 50 cm above the ground so that runoff and animals can not enter. The whole is surmounted by a conical roof which is heavy and thick enough to not let raindrops filter through.

The outside of the hut has been changed despite the desire of some Bamiléké notables who wish to keep the old local architecture. The thatched roof has been replaced by a corrugated iron roof and the walls are not covered with bamboo curtains. In the inside of the huts, however, everything remains the same. The fireplace is at the centre of the main room; three stones are enough to support the pots. All the furniture is made of bamboo such as the ladder to climb to the attic as well as the shelves for household utensils, beds, and stools.

Initiation concessions surround the chiefdomrun by influential leaders. An example of the different initiation concessions of the Chief or "Fam" is the concession for royal bracelet and the concession of "Taptouom-Kwamou", one of the two initiators of "Todjom", an initiatory remedy administered to all Bandjoun babies regardless of where they live.

The chiefdom forest is very important. The part just behind the large hut includes the "Fam" or place of burial of the Chief. It is only accessible by initiates. Another forest is near the market place of "Dzemto" and all along the foreigners' hill called "mghue". It is the resting place of the totems of initiates.

The chiefdom is the focal point for the different provinces or "Dje" which are traditional administrative units each with special features. For example, German missionaries lived at "Djiomghue" just after the foreigners' river. "Dje Njiomghue" specialises in magic or "Nkou" led by "Tatuene" and "Tatuebou". The fight against evil spirits to cancel the rain during important ceremonies or to find the spirit of a deceased initiate is their domain. "Dje Djesse" specialises in "Dje" or sacrifices to bless the Chief and ask for rain from God. When it is too hot "Dzudie Teyo", "Dzudie Tambou" and 5 others make a trip to Baleng and their return is hailed the first rain before seeding.

Unlike the Chief, who is buried by initiates at "Fam", wives and princes are buried in other concessions out of the chiefdom.

The chiefdom also contains a museum where there are accessories of the old chiefs and the heritage of the family. It is a large modern building that also serves as a festival hall, meeting room, and community hall. There are a large number of art objects that belonged to his ancestors:

- gourds and statues ornamented with pearls
- jewelry and ivory statuettes
- masks
- dancing hats: the largest is worn only by the Chief during the annual festival and weighs 25 kg. He wears it throughout most of the exhibition dancing or "Tso" or roughly two laps around the Dzemto market. He is helped by the servants who also wear their ponytails, while other notables are aided in transporting their hats by a son.
- paintings, furniture (including thrones)
- hunting trophies

== The Fô'A-Djo ==
The King of Bandjoun, also called Fô'A-Djo, is the central person in the Kingdom. He is installed as a Demiurge through the powerful rituals of enthronement as Grand Master of the Goung'Ha-Djo (Kingdom of Bandjoun). As a descendant of the founding ancestors he has a primal political power subservient to the sacredness of his royal ancestry. Supernatural powers are transmitted to him at the complex initiation ritual that accompanies his enthronement. The King becomes the master of magic and sacred occult powers called "Kêh". These mystic attributes enhance the person of the King and provide great stature to the Venerable High Priest whose power rises above those of the sorcerers of the kingdom.

The Fô'A-Djo is:

- the holder of magical-religious power because he is considered as a superior being with a charismatic power. It is the primary intermediary between the dead and the living.
- the holder of economic power. He is the sole owner of the territory constituting his state. It is he who gives the right to use the land, a right which can be removed for unworthiness. By this he is all powerful since land is an indispensable benefit. The land can not be sold because it is the property of the gods who give it, through the Chief, for use only by the inhabitants of the chiefdom.
- the judge and referee: it is he who appoints the members of the central court under his presidency, settles disputes, and makes final judgments on cases referred by the district court. He delegates to district chiefs the power to judge small cases in the territory under their jurisdiction.
- the holder of political and administrative power: he divides the territory into districts and appoints district chiefs to whom he delegates some of his powers. The population pays him taxes through work and in-kind whose frequency and amount are not fixed but depend on the needs of the Chief and the competitive spirit of the taxpayers. The Chief is assisted in his government by influential people from society grouped in customary secret societies.

=== The Chief's wives ===
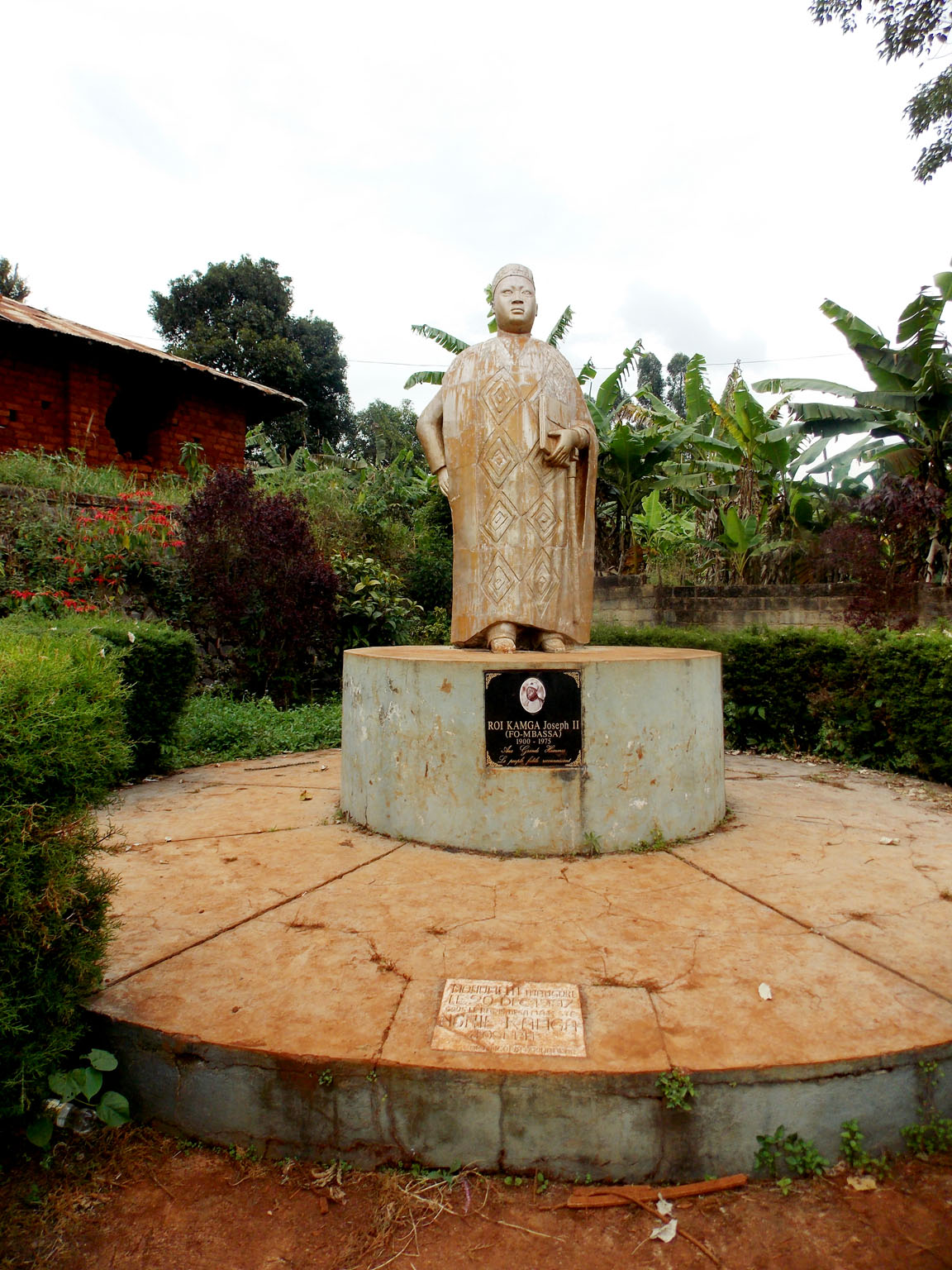
Statue of King Kamga II

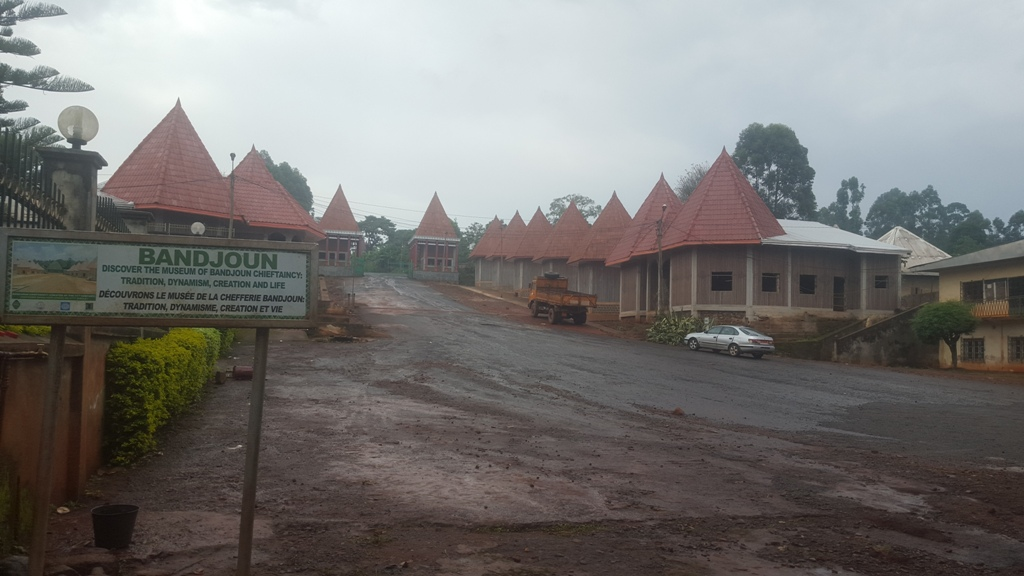
Modern Bandjoun Palace in West Cameroon

The Chief's family is very large.

One of the great chiefs of Bandjoun, King Kamga II, had several dozen wives and nearly 250 children. Since his death in 1975 his succession was ensured in turn by his sons:

- Fotué Kamga (an agriculture technician who built the museum and the modern palace) died in a car accident near his kingdom after marrying 30 young wives;
- Ngnié Kamga (civil administrator and finally dancer, he initiated the annual Pride Week "Msem" of Bandjouns) had 60 wives including the widows of his brother Fotué Kamga;
- Djomo Honoré Kamga (polymer engineer) is rebuilding heritage destroyed by a fire just after his accession to the throne. In addition to new wives he has the responsibility to take the young widows of his predecessors as a sign of continuity.

=== Structure of the traditional government ===
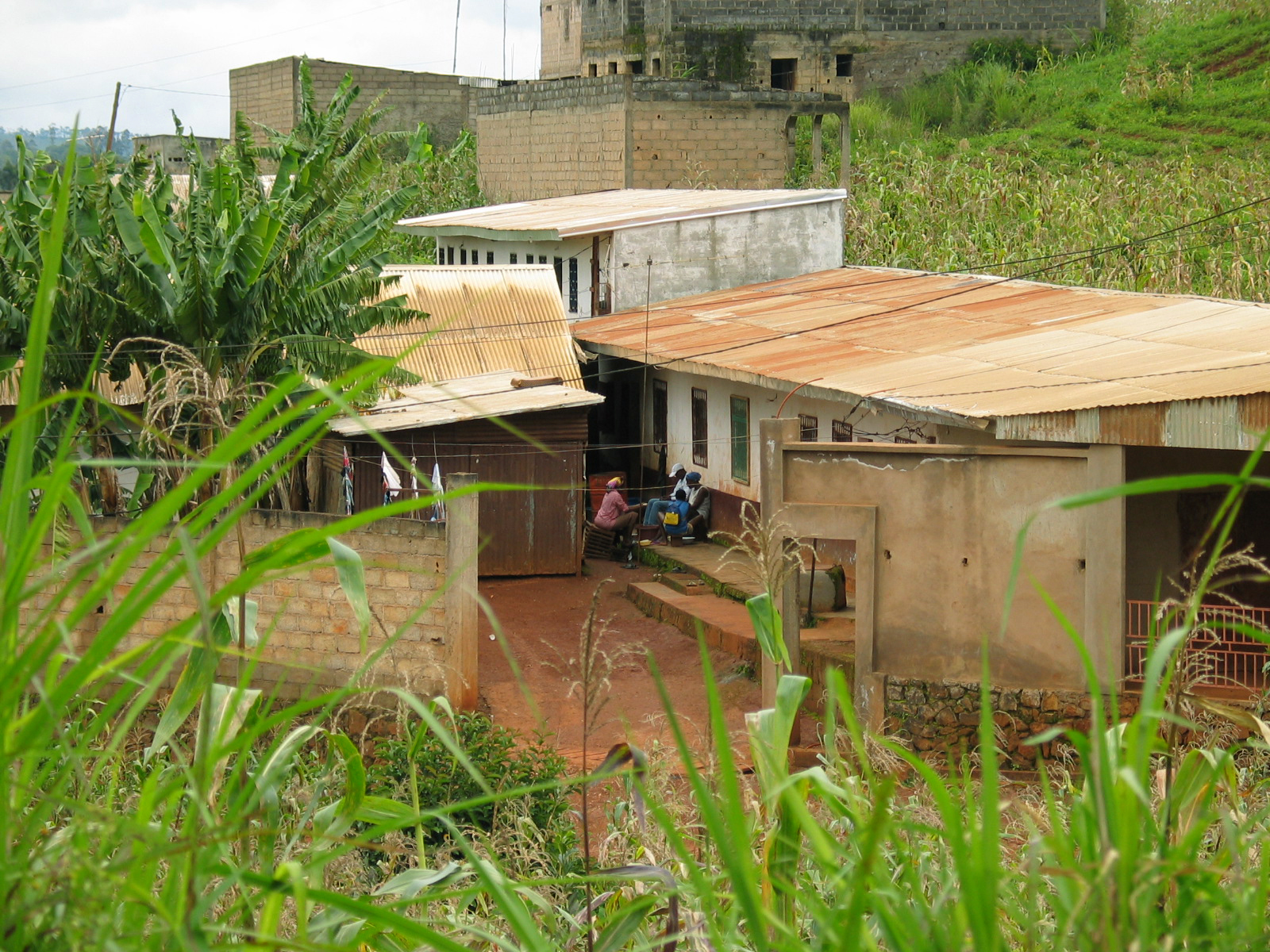
A Bamileke Compound in Bandjoun

The Fô'A-Djo is surrounded by some personalities who ensure a magical-religious and mystical Royal magistracy as well as other administrative and political support functions. There is in the primary function the "Kwi-Pou" and in secondary functions the Circle of Nine Notables. In administrative functions are the Circle of Seven Commissioners of Duchies and in political functions are the Royal Government and the Grand Dukes of the Kingdom.

- 1) The Kwi-Pou is the second person after the King. He is made Viceroy shortly after the appointment of the King. The corresponding ritual is the same as that used to initiate the King. His role is to assist the King. He is appointed from among the king's brothers who do not have the same mother. The Kwi-Pou's mother is one of the wives of the late King and co-wife of the "Ma Mefo" or mother of the King. So he creates an equilibrium between the sovereign and his half-brother. The destinies of these two people, however, are related because if the King should disappear, his Kwi-Pou loses his functions. So it is difficult for the Viceroy to plot against the King. The Kwi-Pou assists the King and forms a robust duo with him against the "Mkam-Bvuh". His influence is counterbalanced, however, as seen below by that of another son of the late King called the "Wafo" who has the distinction of being the full brother of the king - i.e. another son of the "Ma Mefo".
- 2) The Circle of Nine Notables is made up of personalities who have magical-religious powers and who have served the Magistracy for centuries. These notables are called "Mkam Bvuh'" which literally means "9 Notables". Designated from father to son according to the mystical traditions attached to the theocratic foundations of the Kingdom they work in the most absolute secrecy and should not in principle reveal their identity to anyone. At their death their colleagues hold the funeral rituals in a sacred covered atmosphere performed by the King himself. Their succession is then structured around one of their sons according to highly sacred rules. The Nine Notables sit in Council under the chairmanship of the King. They inform and assist him in all important legislative decisions. The room where a Council of Mkam Vuh convenes is called "Lah'kam" and is a kind of Council of State composed of thirty members of whom the Nine Notables are most prominent with voting. The Chief Doyen of the Nine Notables is the "Tekomghê". Almost all laws passed by the Chief are initiated by the Mkam. The council limits and tempers the authority of the Chief thus avoiding the abuse of power and a potential slide into dictatorship.
- 3) The Circle of Seven Commissioners of Duchies are administrative people who may or may not have aristocratic ancestry. They are among the servants of the King called "Mtchoh'-Fo". Once appointed as Commissioner of a Duchy a person is called the "Mkem-Djie". Their mission is to ensure the administrative supervision of the Seven Duchies called the "Djie" (Juo Mhuo, Djie-Se, Djie-Leng, Djie-Theguem, Djie-Kouoh, Djie-SEH, and Djie-Bem). These duchies were established by King Notouom who structured the Kingdom in the early 17th century. They collect information on the Duchy through a network of royal police agents called "Kouh'-Gué". Together with the village administration agents, they are responsible for maintaining peace, order, and internal security. District Chiefs who are at the head of a district of the village each act within their sphere of competence.
- 4) The Royal Government is formed by the servants of the King or "Mtchoh-Fo". They are divided between the Internal Service sponsored by the "Tadiye" and the administration of "Fam" sponsored by a special assistant called "Ngwalah".
- 5) The Dukes of the Kingdom are a group of aristocratic dignitaries having regard for the affairs of the Kingdom affairs and who guarantee external security for the Chief analogous to the power of the "Mkam Bvuh'" and the "Kwi-Pou". The most important personality of this aristocratic group is the "Wafo" or "NgWafo". This is the third person of the Kingdom with the rank of Crown Prince in the King's lineage. This is the most influential brother of the king, a son of the late King who had the same legitimate claim to the throne but was not made king. As a full brother of the King he is under the protection of the Queen-mother or "Ma Mefo". He watches over the safety of the King but from the outside of the chiefdom. The "Wafo" is like a duke invested with personal territory in the Duchy that was assigned to him by the late King during his lifetime when the Wafo was a Prince. The most prestigious Wafo who left a lasting mark on the history of the Kingdom was His Princely Highness Foualeng Georges, the youngest son of King Fotso II and the Great Queen Mother Ma Manewa. His elder brother King Fo Kamga II had one of the most prestigious and longest reigns in the history of the Kingdom of Bandjoun. Known as "Ta Wafo Foualeng Georges", he deployed his Princely Magistracy in one of the most iconic area of the Kingdom: Famleng. This county is located in the heart of the Duchy of Djie-Se. It is the historic seat when the Kingdom was founded in the 16th century by King Notchwegom. Ta Wafo Foualeng had almost as many wives and children as his brother King Kamga II. Highly influential and feared by the Notables and by all the nobility of the kingdom he was, like any good Wafo, the external security for the King. He shone in his decisions and trade-offs and was the most reliable means of communication between the King and his subjects in the Kingdom and also with neighbouring kingdoms because he could intercede effectively without the shackles which notables had in control of a party. In some important cases some notables came to meet the Wafo to convince him of their view because they were well aware that the king would consult him before making his decision.

== The Fô'A-Djo Dynasty ==
1. NOTAM CHWEGOM or NOTCHWEGOM born around 1527. Reign : 1552–1569 (17 years)
2. DU’GNECHOM KAPCHIE born around 1553. Reign : 1569–1589 (20 years)
3. NOTOUOM CHIEBOU or NOTOUOM I born around 1570. Reign : 1589–1641 (52 years)
4. NOTOUOM MEYABDIEBO ou NOTOUOM II born around 1610. Reign : 1641–1679 (38 years)
5. NOTOUOM NGNOTIO or NOTOUOM III born around 1645. Reign : 1679–1721 (42 years)
6. BADHEPA MEDJUIFO born around 1680. Reign : 1721–1765 (44 years)
7. KAPTO TOHEM born around 1731. Reign : 1765–1765 (9 months)
8. KAPTUE METUEBOU born around 1740. Reign : 1765–1820 (55 years, second longest)
9. KAMGA NKUNG or KAMGA I born around 1792. Reign : 1820–1885 (65 years, longest)
10. FOTSO MOGOUNG or FOTSO I born around 1855. Reign : 1886–1900 (14 years)
11. FOTSO MESSUDOM or FOTSO II born around 1860. Reign : 1900–1925 (25 years)
12. KAMGA MANEWA or KAMGA II born 1902. Reign : 1925–1975 (50 years)
13. FOTUE KAMGA GAMGNE, Son of KAMGA MANEWA, born in 1936. Reign : 1975–1984 (9 years)
14. NGNIE KAMGA, Son of KAMGA MANEWA, born in 1934. Reign : 1984-2003 (19 years)
15. Dr DJOMO KAMGA, Son of KAMGA MANEWA, born in 1953. Reign : since 2004.

== Bandjoun Station ==
Barthelemy Toguo is a Cameroonian multidisciplinary artist who constructed the Bandjoun Station between the cities of Bandjoun and Bafoussam in Western Cameroon. The station was built over the course of two years, starting in 2005 and opening in 2007. It includes an exhibition space, a library, an artist residency, and an organic farm. It was made to foster contemporary art and culture within the local community. The station is composed of two distinct buildings divided into different centers that are used for multiple purposes. The main building is designed with five armed concrete pillars and topped with a ten meter high gable; this sloped roof respects the traditional architecture or the area. The exterior of the buildings are covered in bright colorful patterns and mosaics that are derived from Toguo's own artwork. Being that the station is in this particular location it is able to welcome all sorts of traditions. People are invited to appropriate this space, to organize festivals for or related to their culture such as burials, births, and even weddings. It is all done in hopes to create social cohesion within the community.

== See also ==
- Communes of Cameroon
- Departments of Cameroon
