= Mifi (department) =

- Department
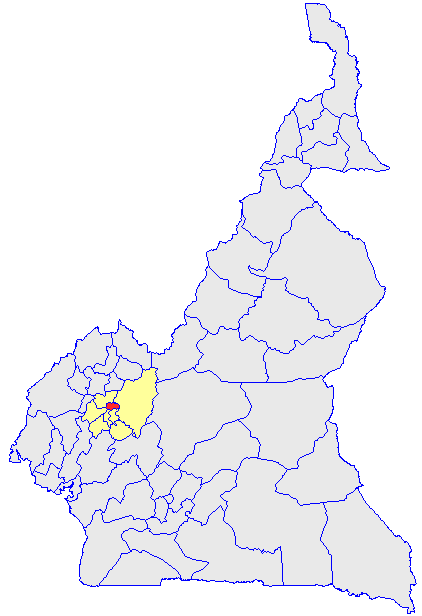
- Department location in Cameroon

- Location within Cameroon Location within Africa
- Country: Cameroon
- Province: West Province
- Capital: Bafoussam

Area
  - Total: 155 sq mi (402 km^{2})

Population (2019)
  - Total: 80,400
- Time zone: UTC+1 (WAT)

Mifi is a department of West Province in Cameroon. The department covers an area of 402 km^{2} and as of 2005 had a total population of 301,456. The capital of the department lies at Bafoussam.

== Subdivisions ==
The department is divided administratively into 4 communes and in turn into villages.

=== Communes ===
- Bafoussam (Urban)
- Bafoussam (Rural)
- Bamougoum
- Lafé-Baleng
