= Demding =

Demdeng
- Commune and town
- Interactive map of Demdeng
- Coordinates: 5°19′46″N 10°27′52″E
- Country: Cameroon
- Time zone: UTC+1 (WAT)

Demdeng (or Demding) is a town and commune in Cameroon.

== See also ==
- Communes of Cameroon
