= Bayangam =

Coordinates: 5°18′N 10°27′E

- Commune and town
- Interactive map of Bayangam
- Country: Cameroon
- Time zone: UTC+1 (WAT)

Bayangam is a town and commune in Cameroon.

== See also ==
- Communes of Cameroon
