= La Nouvelle Liberté =

Public artwork in Douala, Cameroon

La Nouvelle liberté
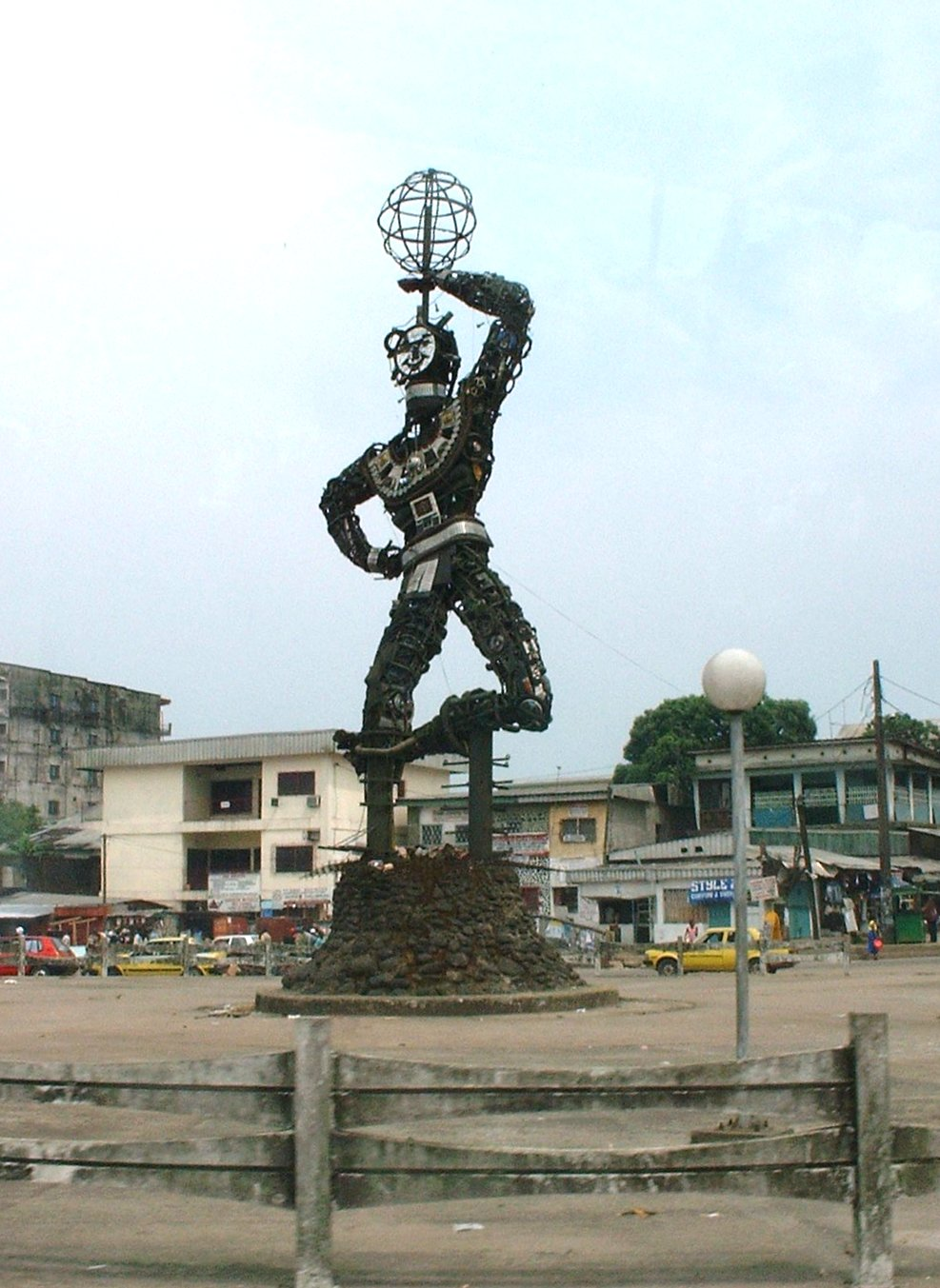
- Artist: Joseph-Francis Sumégné
- Year: 1996
- Type: recycled material
- Medium: Sculpture
- Dimensions: 12 m (470 in); 5 m diameter (200 in)
- Location: Rond-Point Deïdo Douala, Cameroon; 4.0593°N 9.7344°E
- Owner: Municipality of Douala

La Nouvelle Liberté is a public artwork in the Deido suburb of Douala, Cameroon.

== The Artwork ==
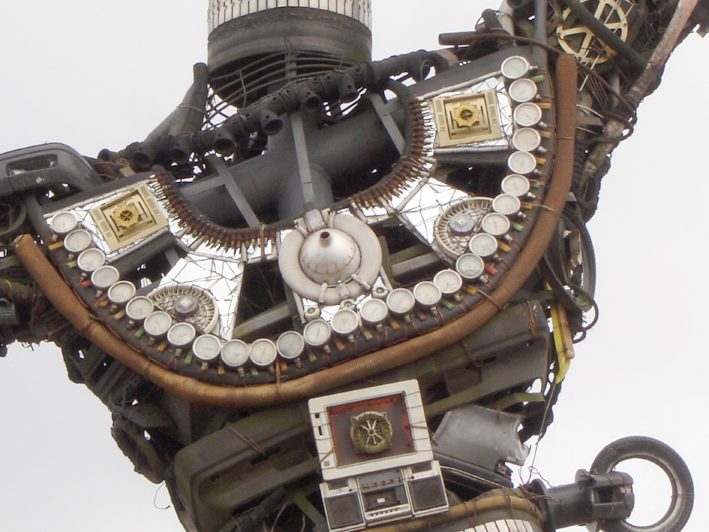

La Nouvelle Liberté is the most famous and emblematic artwork of Douala, which today has become a symbol of the city.

Produced by Joseph-Francis Sumégné in 1996, the Nouvelle Liberté is a majestic 12 meters tall sculpture made of scrap metals, erected in the middle of the busiest roundabouts of Douala, the Rond Point Deido. It features a 5 meters wingspan, and a mass of 8 tons.

This artwork pays tribute to the contemporary culture of the city: the culture of recycling, of the assembly and disassembly of objects, of the ability of citizens in “se débrouiller” (getting by) in many complex situations. Despite the fact La Nouvelle Liberté has become an icon of the city, this sculpture is still often nicknamed the Njo Njo of Deido (meaning the evil, the monster of Deido).

This negative designation is based on the strong protests carried on by local media and native populations against La Nouvelle Liberté. The first polemics mainly concerned the aesthetical features of the sculpture, made of recycled metallic pieces. Also, a violent controversy was raised by media on the origins of the artist (coming from the West Region of Cameroun) taking the fold of an ethnic struggle between the native and not native population of Douala. These diatribes led to subsequent attacks and vandalism of the work.

For these reasons, La Nouvelle Liberté was officially inaugurated eleven years later during SUD2007. The artwork was sponsored by doual'art and donated to the Municipality of Douala (owner). This latter funded the pedestal on which the sculpture stands today. The crossroad where La Nouvelle Liberté was installed is considered the gateway of the city, the most important traffic hub from which the main boulevards of the city bring towards the center (through Akwa district), the Eastern popular districts, and out of Douala (through the Wouri Bridge and Bonaberi district).

After the installation and donation of La Nouvelle Liberté to the Municipality of Douala, this latter has considerably invested on the urbanization of the Rond Point Deido, in particular through the eviction of informal markets surrounding the area, through the installation of street lights, new flooring works, and through the care of the garden of the roundabout.

== Gallery ==
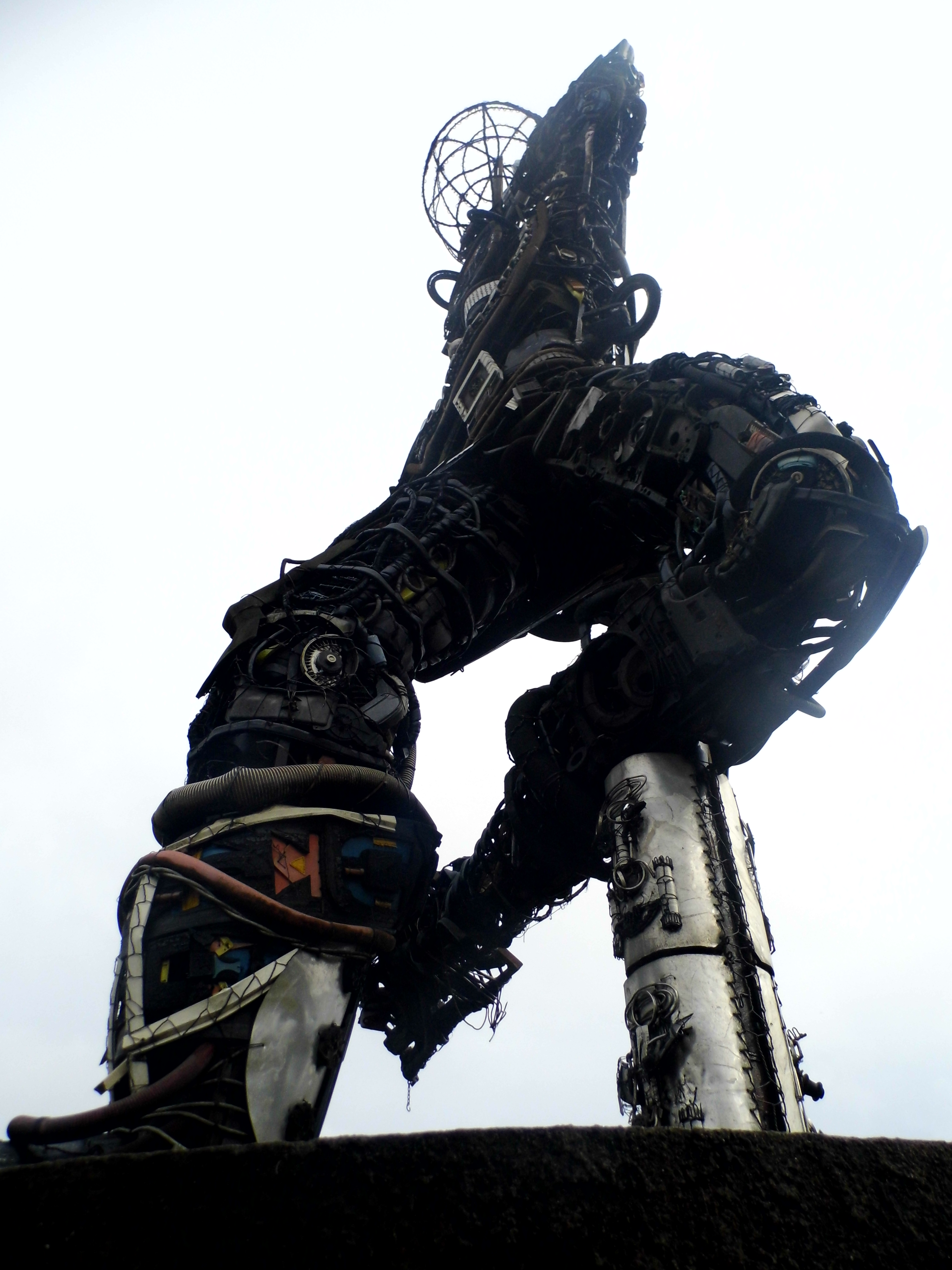

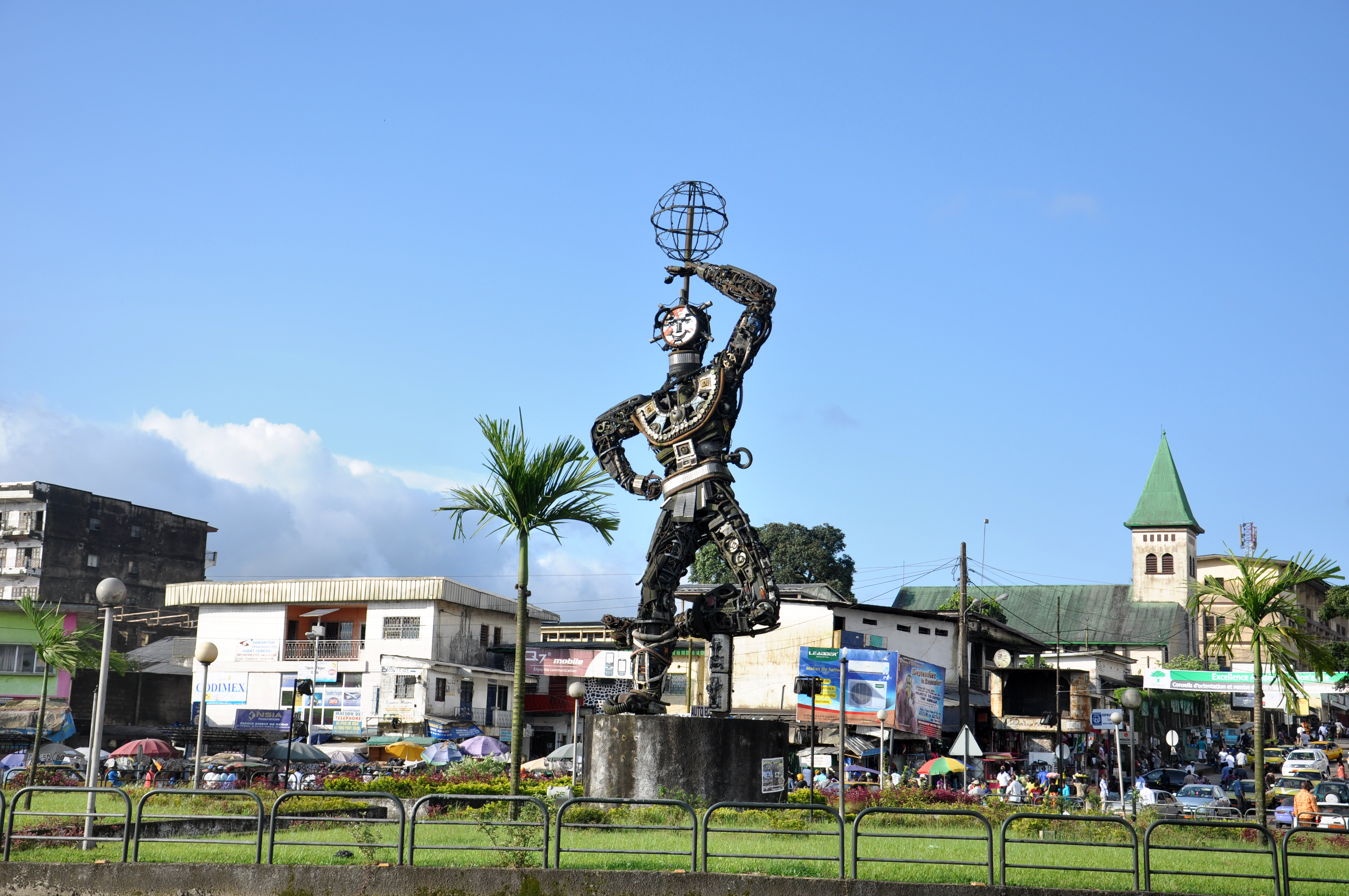

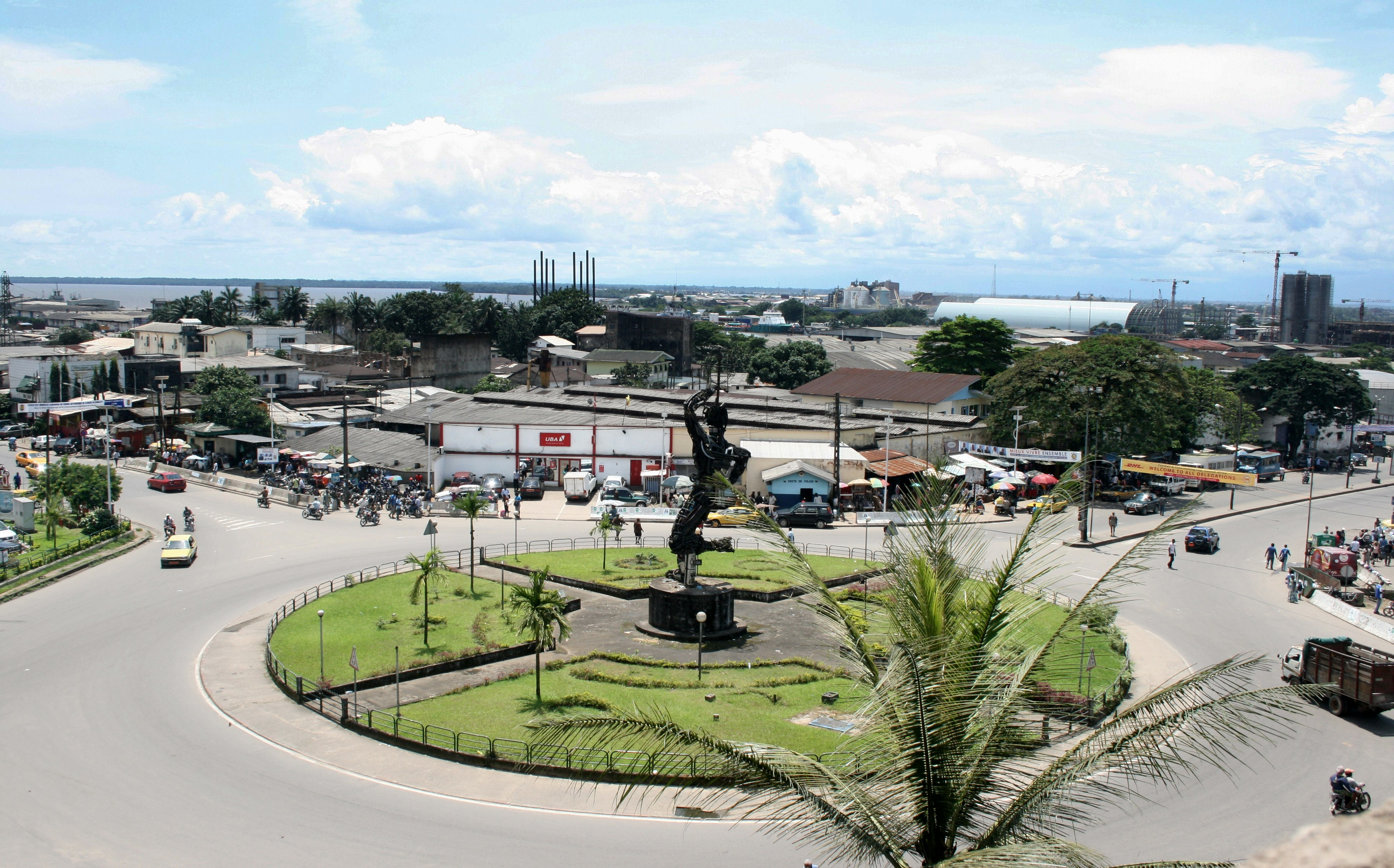

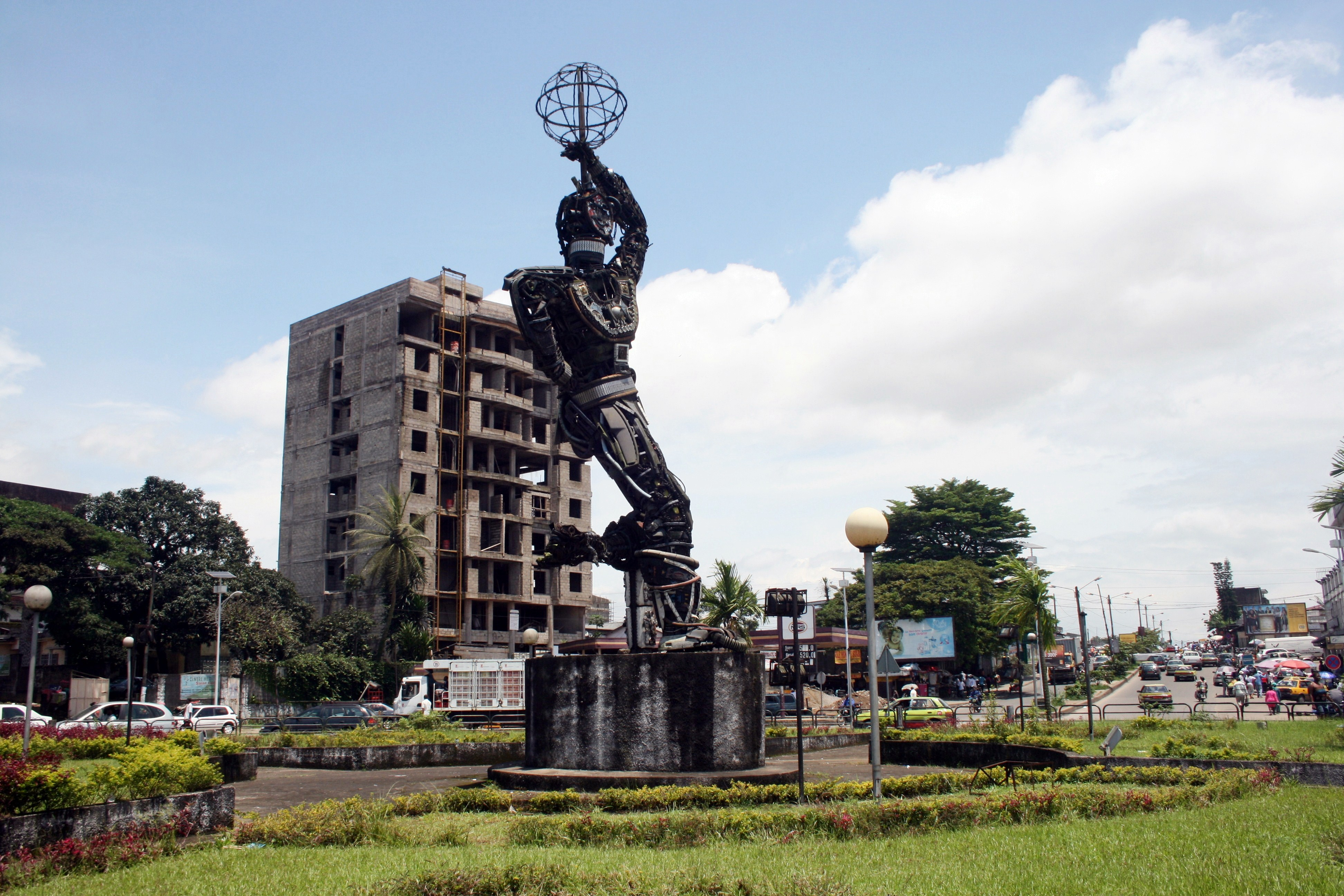

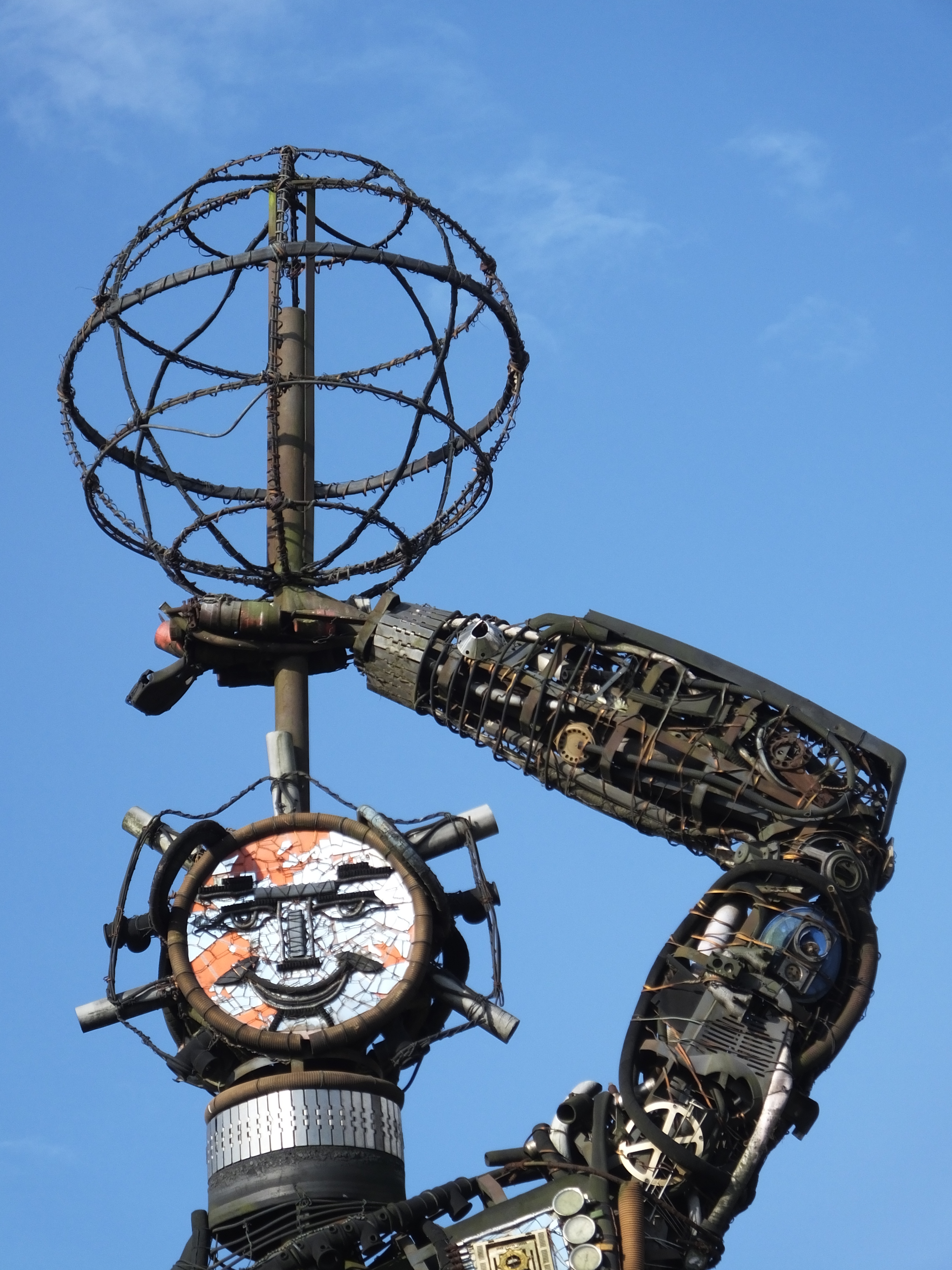

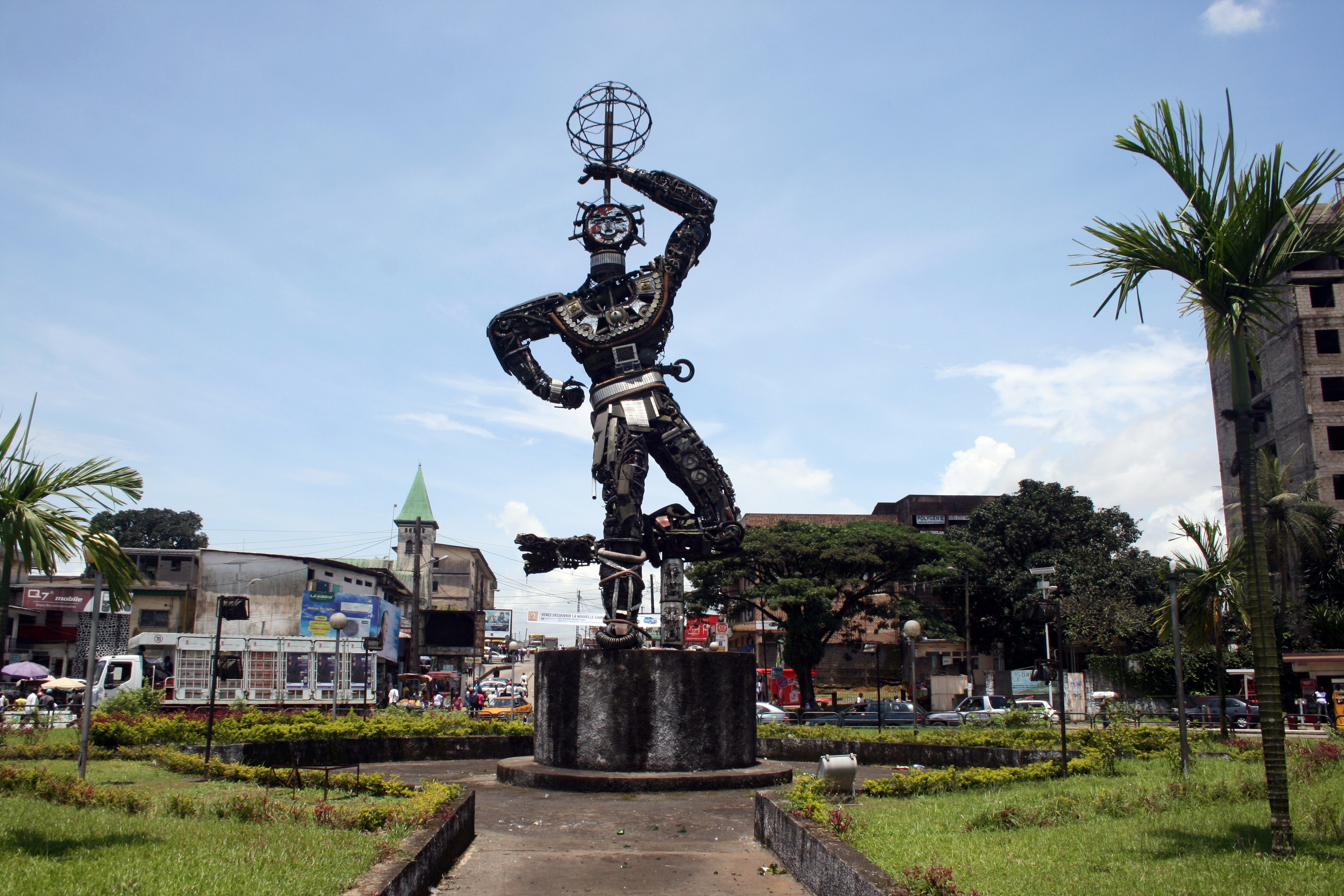

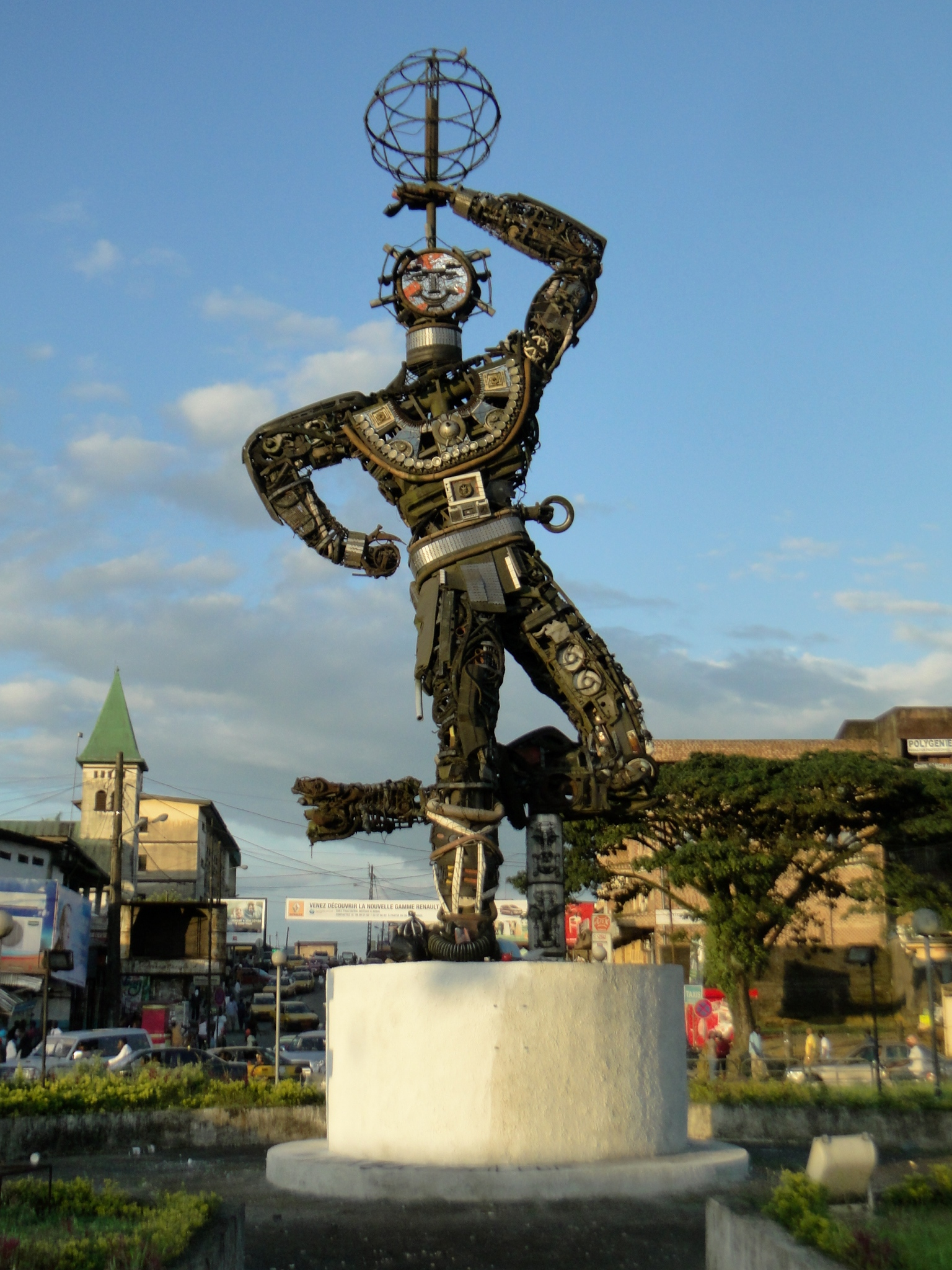

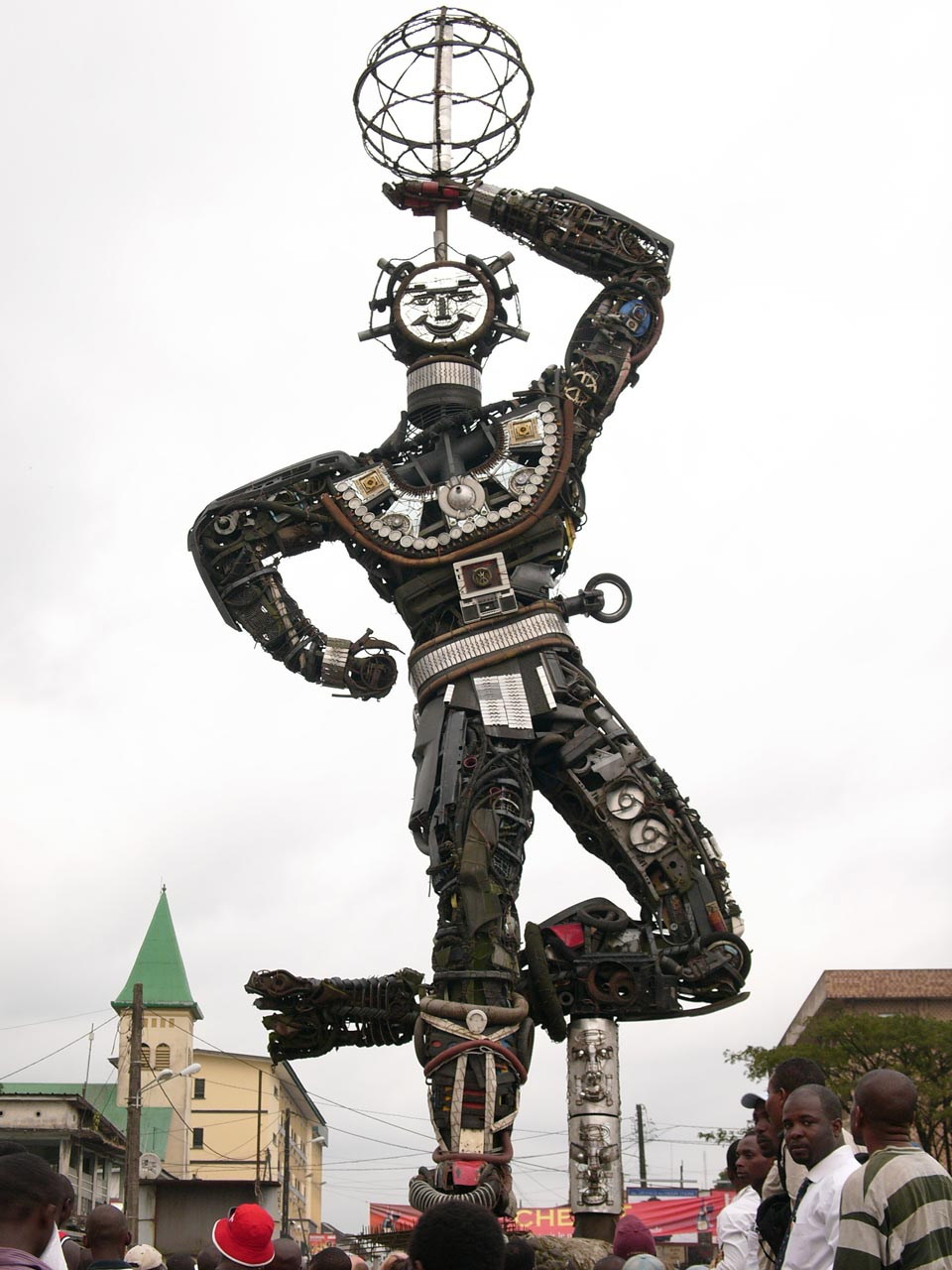

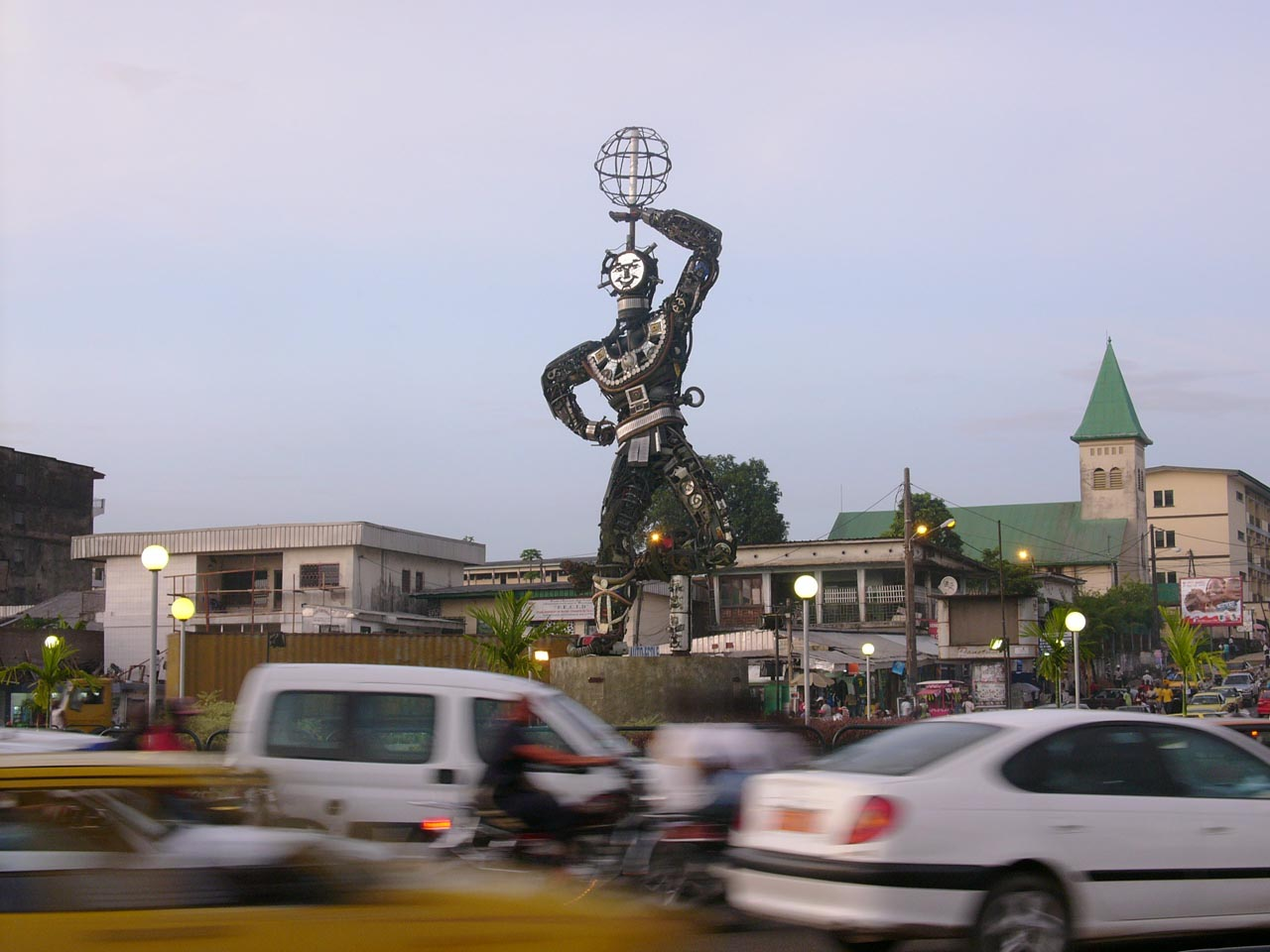

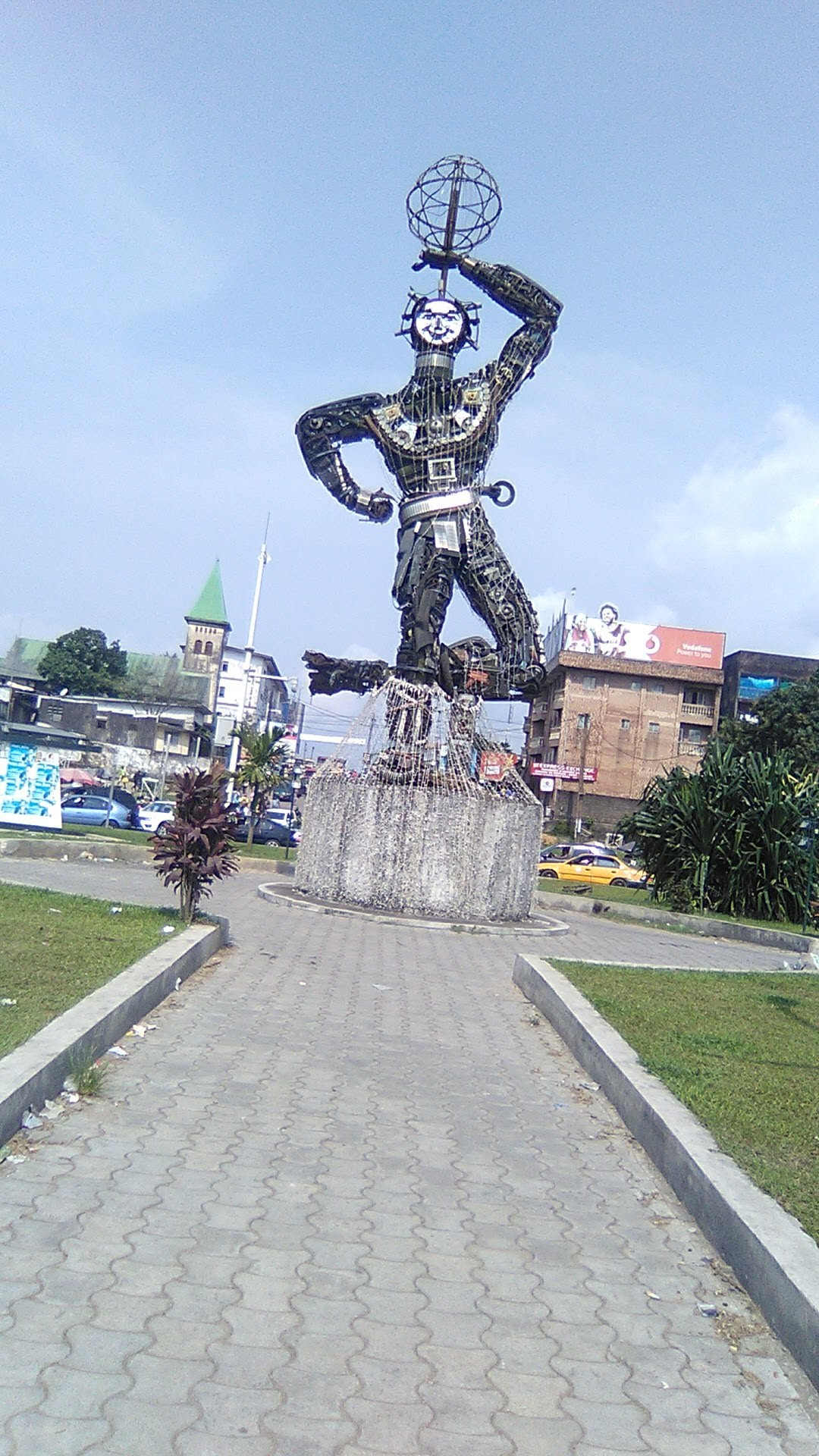

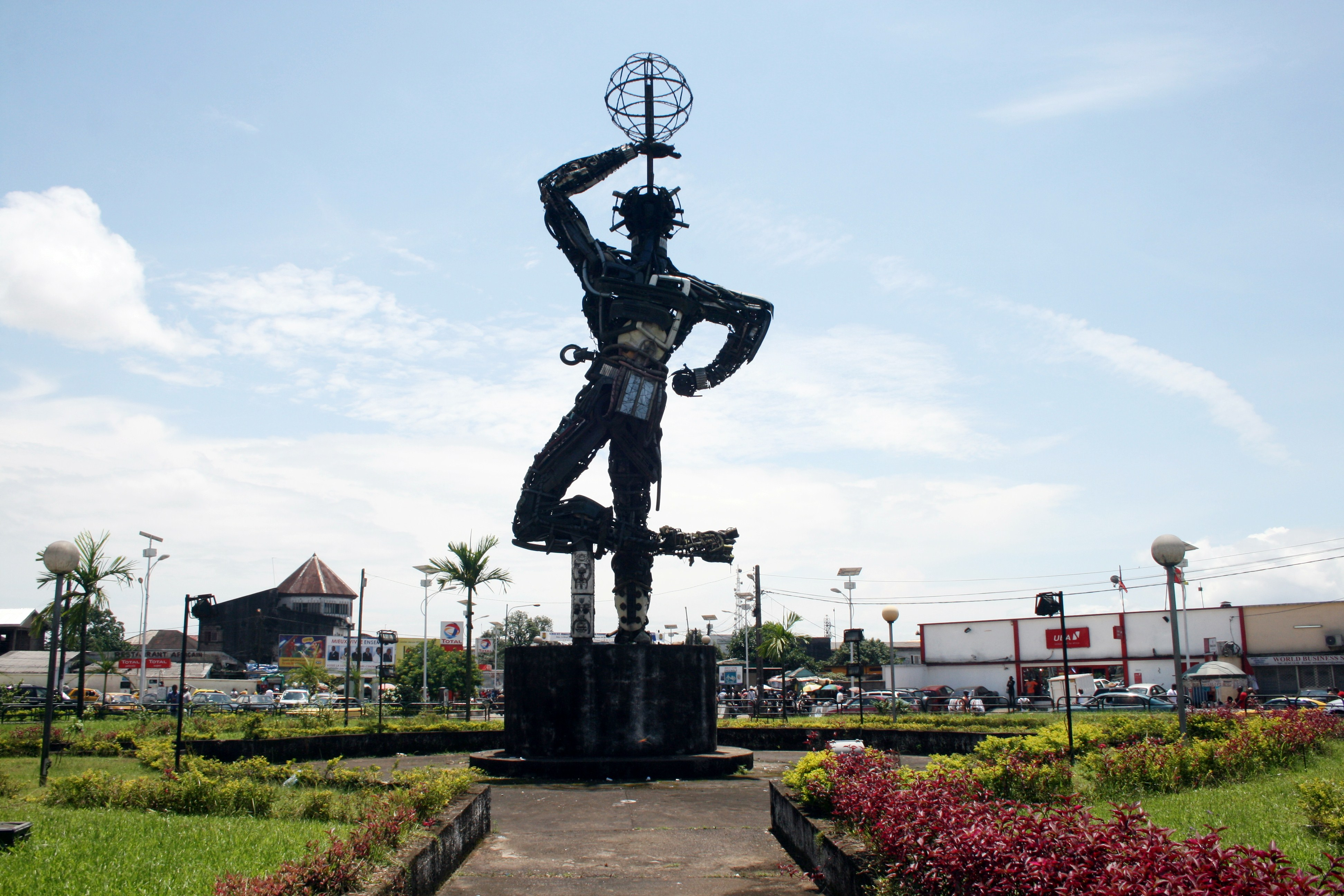

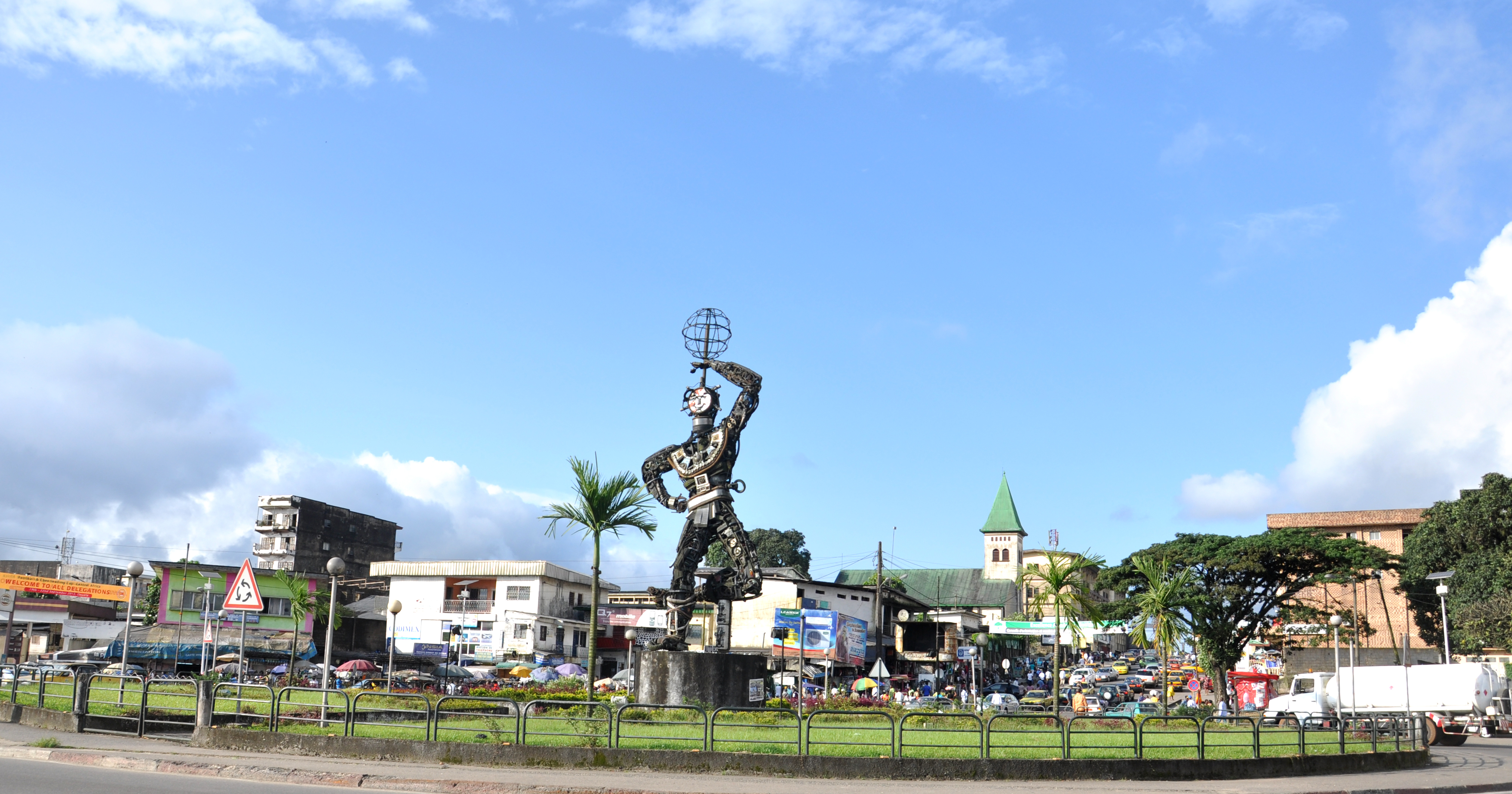

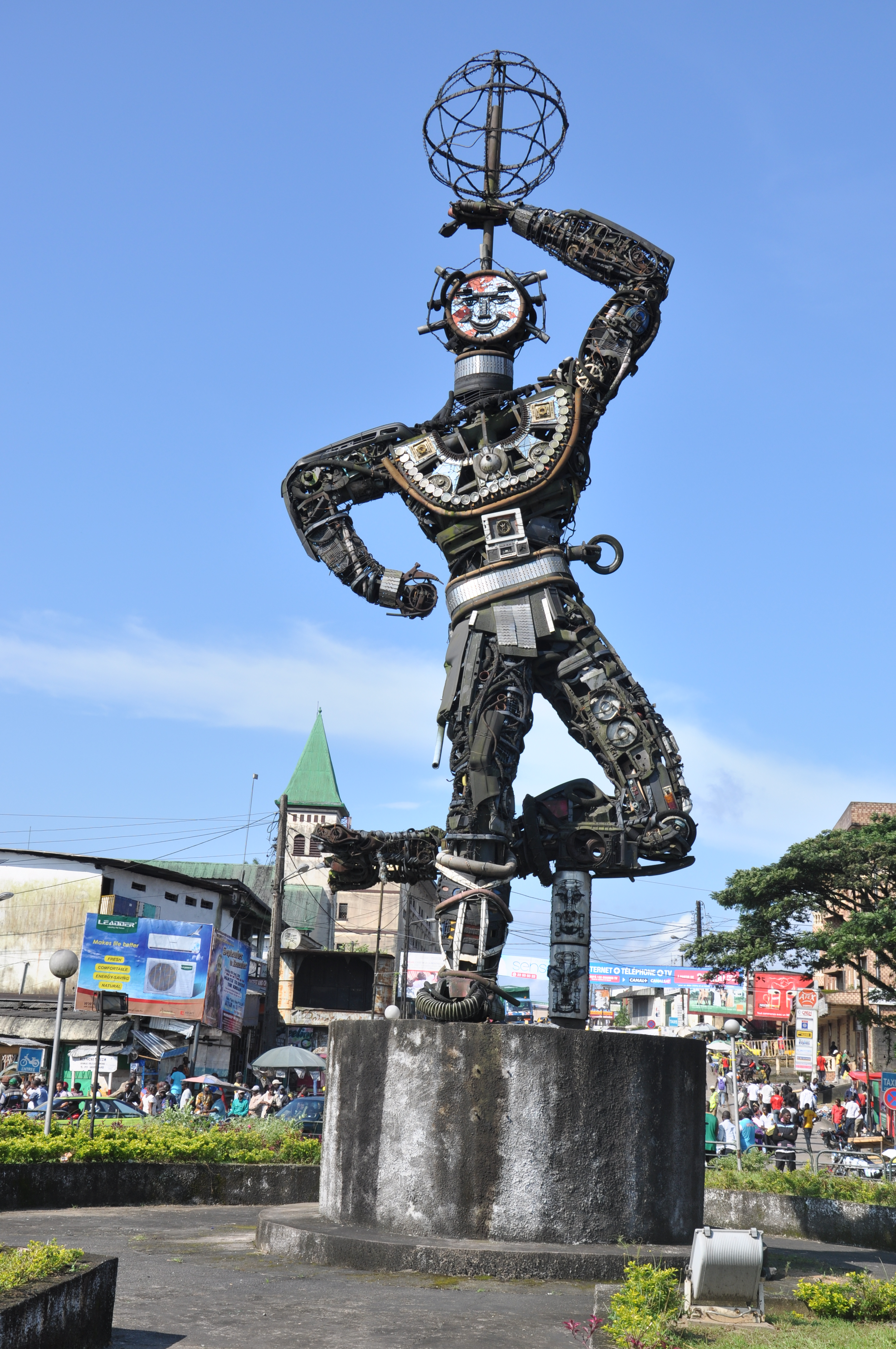

== See also ==
=== Bibliography ===
- Pensa, Iolanda (Ed.) 2017. Public Art in Africa. Art et transformations urbaines à Douala /// Art and Urban Transformations in Douala. Genève: Metis Presses. ISBN 978-2-94-0563-16-6
- Babina, L., and Douala Bell, M. (eds.). (2007): Douala in Translation. A View of the City and Its Creative Transformative Potentials, Rotterdam, Episode Publishers.
- Fokoua, S. O. (2012): «Doual’art. L’art dans la cité », Inter: Art actuel, n°111, p. 61-61.
- Malaquais, D. (2006): «Une nouvelle liberté? Art et politique urbaine à Douala (Cameroun)», Afrique & histoire, n. 5.1, p. 111-134.
- Mouange, E. (2004): «Les arts plastiques au Cameroun, pour un espace d'expression viable», Africultures, n°3, p. 84-93.
- Tcheuyap, A., and Eboussi-Boulaga, F. (2014). Autoritarisme, presse et violence au Cameroun. Paris, KARTHALA Editions.
- Hanussek, C. (2007): La Nouvelle Liberté, or Le Nju-Nju du Rond-Point. A field study on art in public space in Africa. Wien, Springerin
- Verschuren, K., X. Nibbeling and L. Grandin. (2012): Making Douala 2007-2103, Rotterdam, ICU art project.
- Pensa, I. (2012): «Public Art and Urban Change in Douala». In Domus, (7 April 2012).
- Van Der Lan, B. and Jenkins R.S. (eds) (2011). Douala: Intertwined Architectures, The Netherland: ArchiAfrica
- Nzewi, Ugochukwu-Smooth C. (2015): «Art and the public space – doual’art since 1991. A conversation between Ugoc hukwo-Smooth C. Nzewi and Marylin Douala Bell» . In Pinther, K., Fischer, B. and Nzewi, Ugochukwu-Smooth C. (eds) New Spaces for Negotiating Art (and) Histories in Africa, Berlin: Lit Verlag. p. 114-127
- Van der Lans, B. (2010): «Salon Urbaine de Douala 2010». In Architecture plus, (30 December 2010).
- Greenberg, K. (2012): «La ville en tant que site: création d’un public pour l’art contemporain en Afrique». In Carson Chan, Nadim Samman (Eds.) Higher Atlas / Au-delà de l’Atlas – The Marrakech Biennale in Context. Sternberg Press
- Schemmel, A. (2016): Visual Arts in Cameroon: A Genealogy of Non-formal Training, 1976-2014, Bamenda, Langaa Research & Publishing Common Initiative Group
- Marta Pucciarelli (2014) Final Report. University of Applied Sciences and Arts of Southern Switzerland, Laboratory of visual culture.

=== Related articles ===
- List of public art in Douala
- Contemporary African art
