= Face à l'eau =

Public artwork in Douala, Cameroon

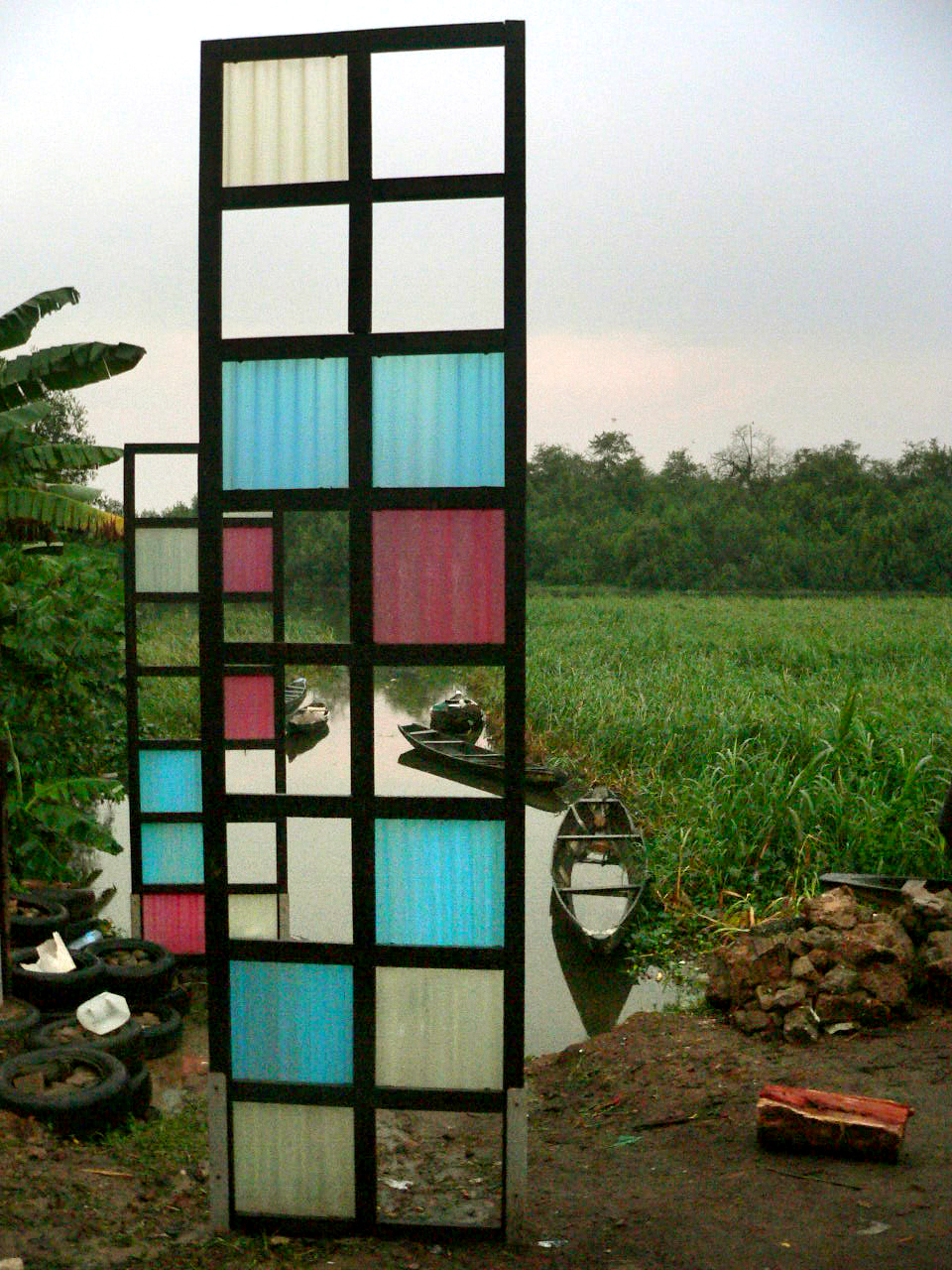
- Artist: Salifou Lindou
- Year: 2008-2010
- Type: Sculpture
- Dimensions: 3.70 m (146 in)
- Location: Bonamouti-Deido, Douala, Cameroon; 4.0672°N 9.7378°E
- Owner: Municipality of Douala

Face à l’eau is a public artwork made by the artist Salifou Lindou between 2008 and 2010. It is made of five panels, each 3.70 metres (12.1 ft) high, in wood, metal, and colored plastic sheets on the banks of the river Wouri in Bonamouti, Douala, Cameroon.

== The artwork ==
Face à l’eau is a passageways installation. It consists of five vertical panels made of wood, metal, and colored plastic sheets on the banks of the river Wouri in Bonamouti. The five single shutters, the highest of which measures 3.7 meters, are installed in such a way that at a certain distance they give the impression of a single screen. The installation is meant to protect the boatmen and fishermen from the view of the passers-by when they wash at the end of their day's work.

The inauguration took place during SUD Salon Urbain de Douala 2010. In 2013, it was restored, with the replacement of broken plastic sheets and dislocation on a higher position.

Face à l’eau is located in the suburb Bonamouti-Deido.

== Gallery ==
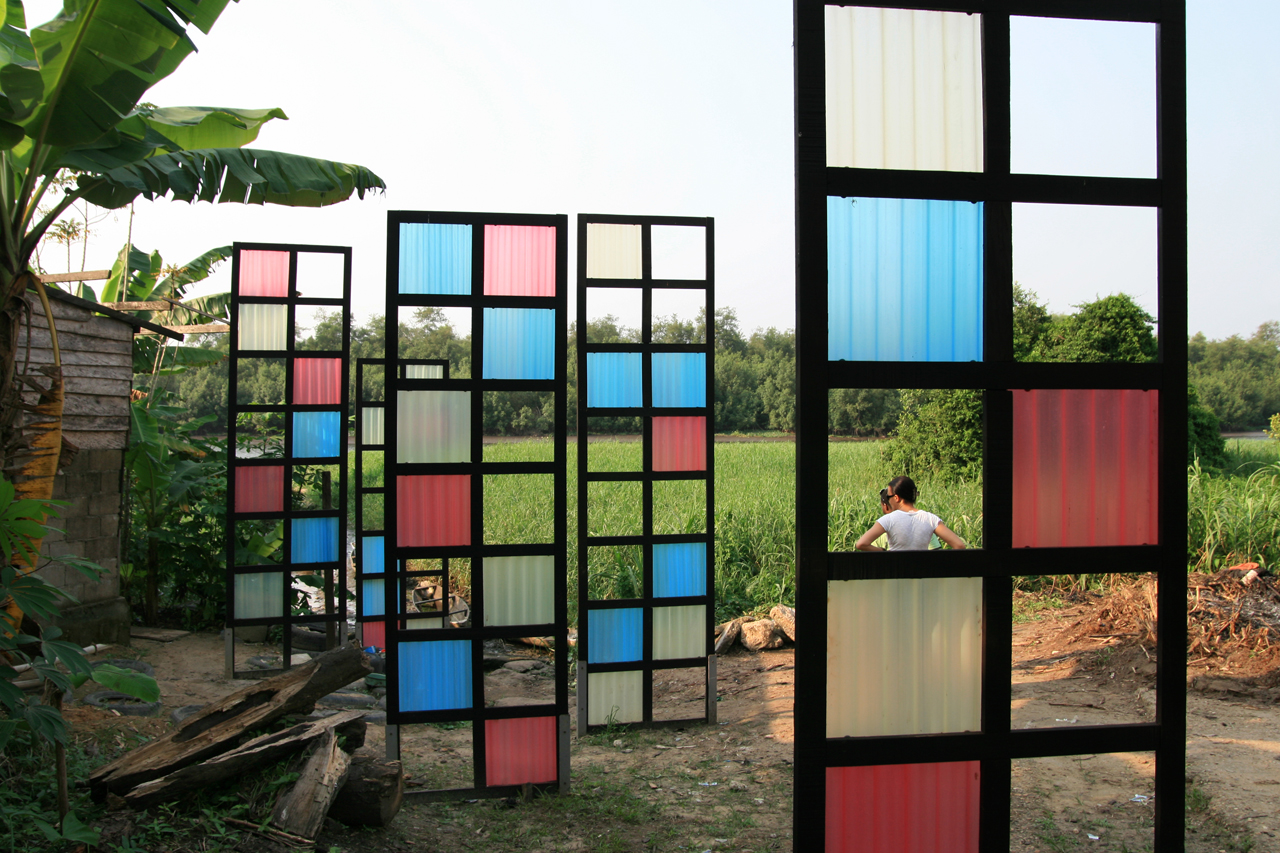

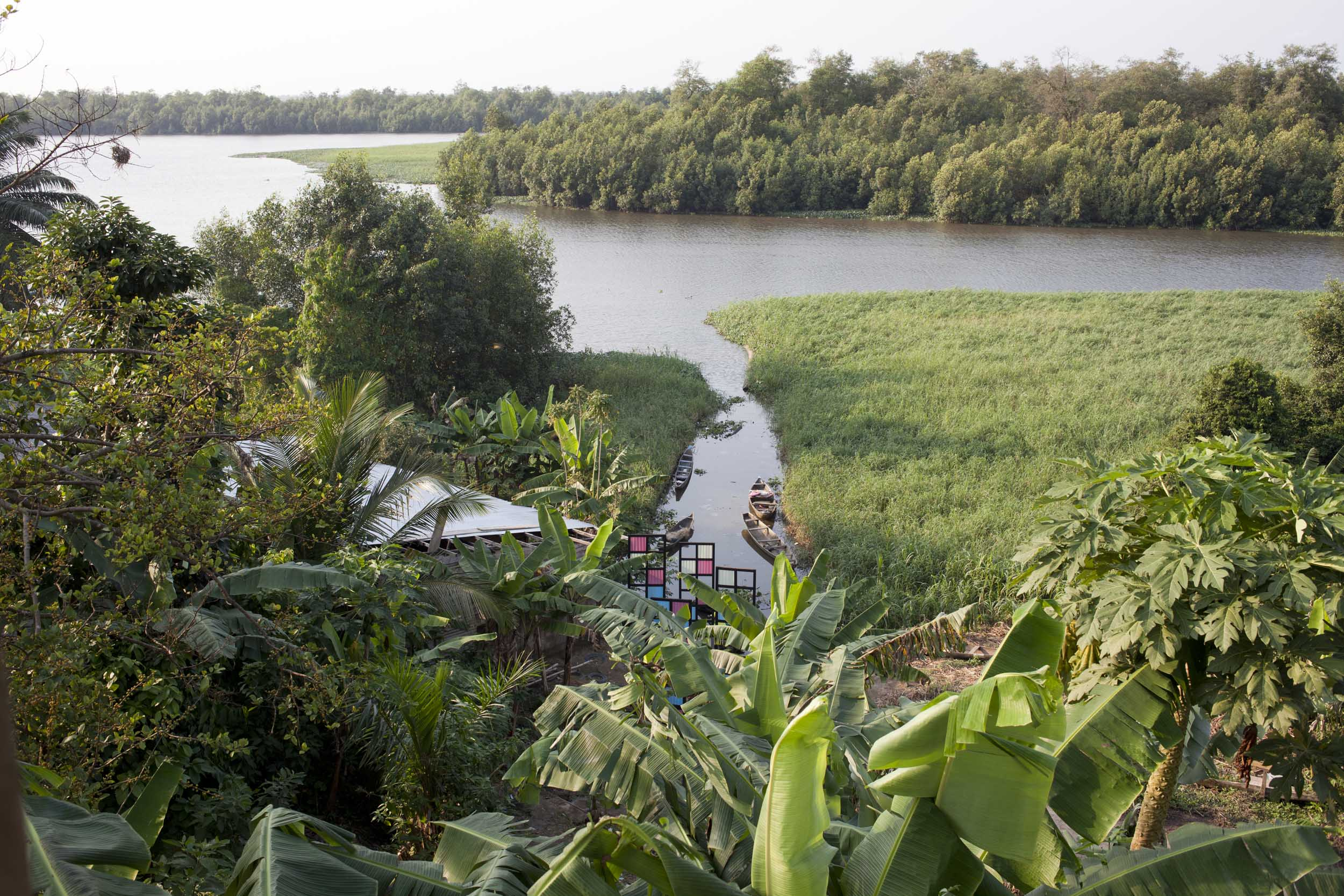

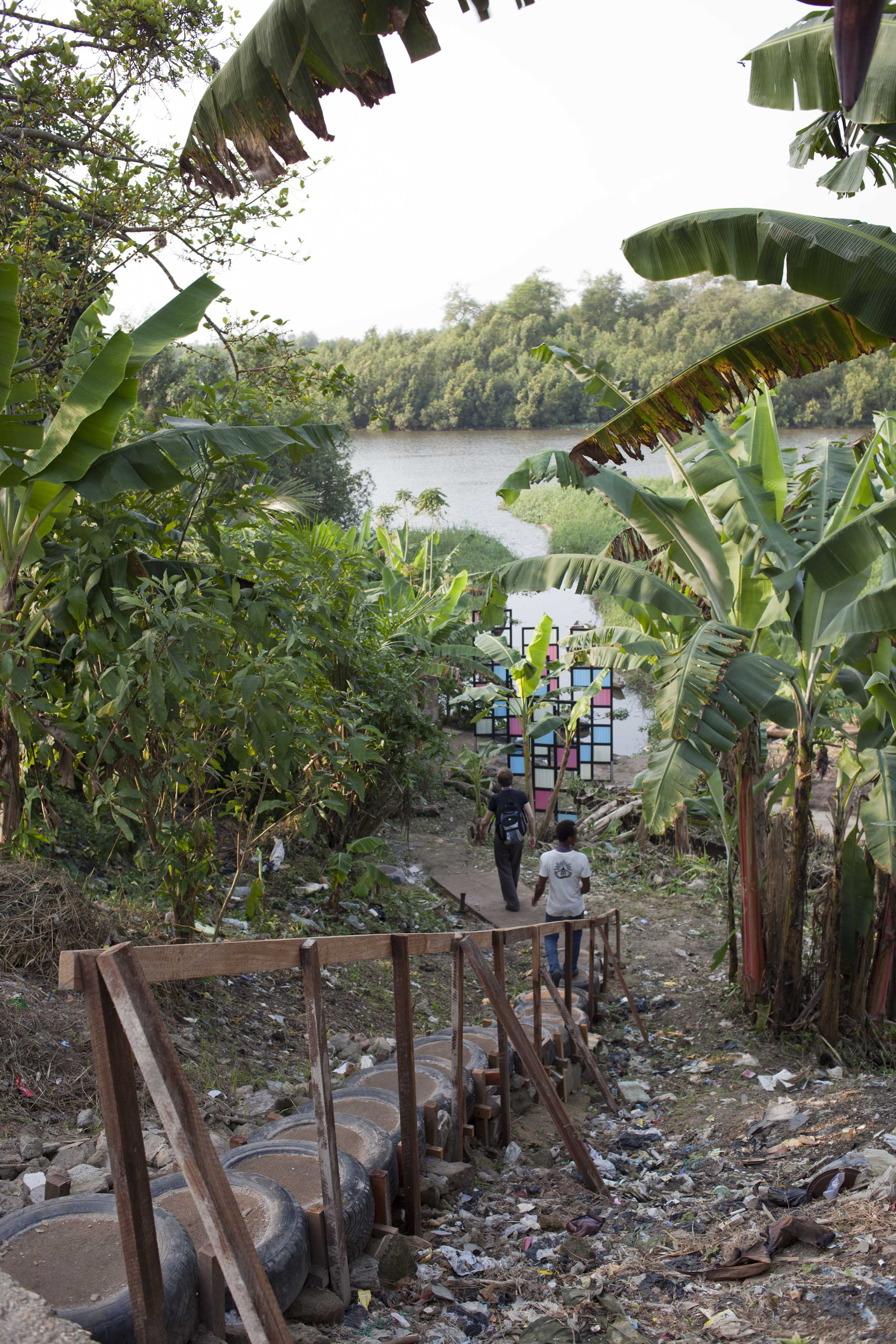

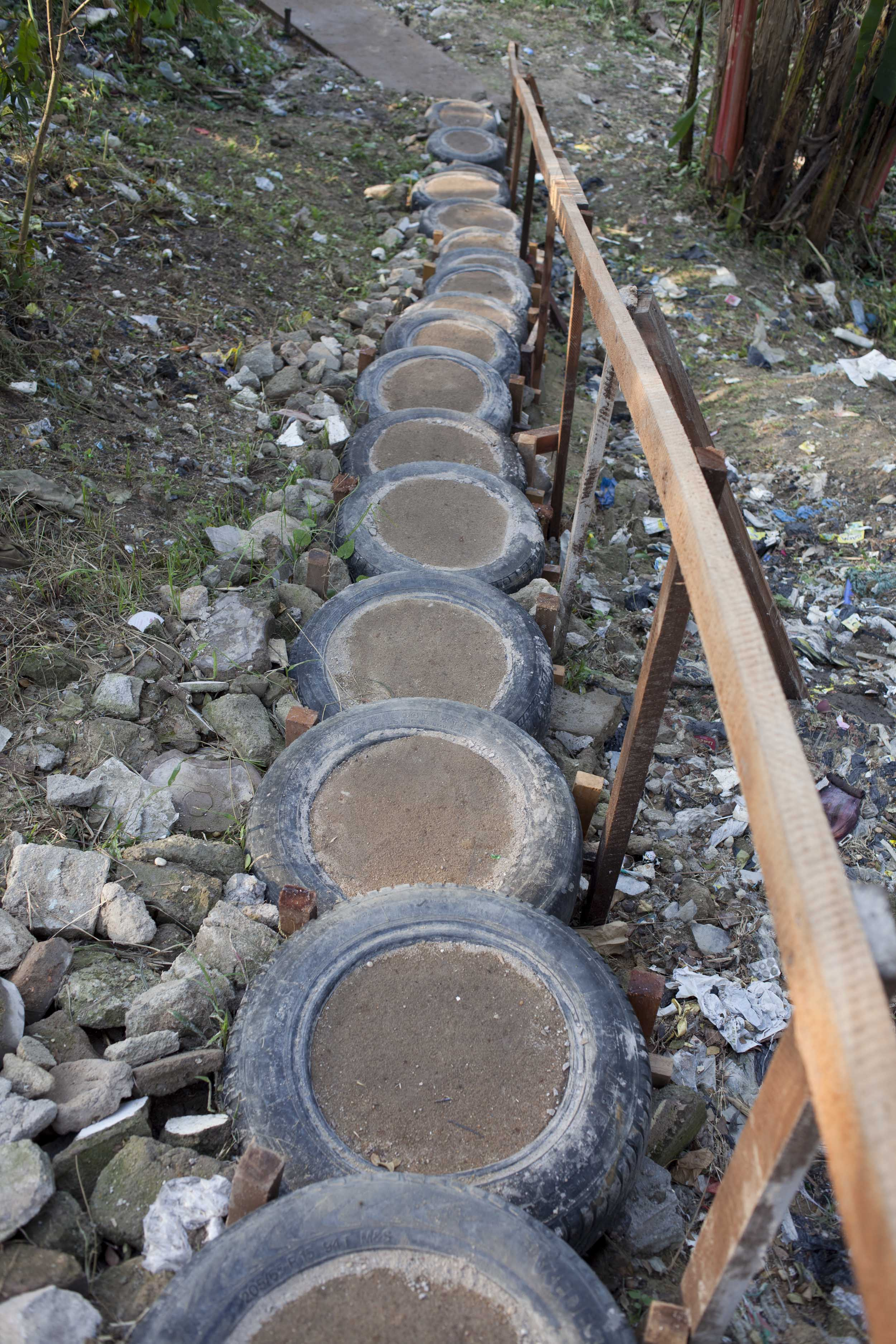

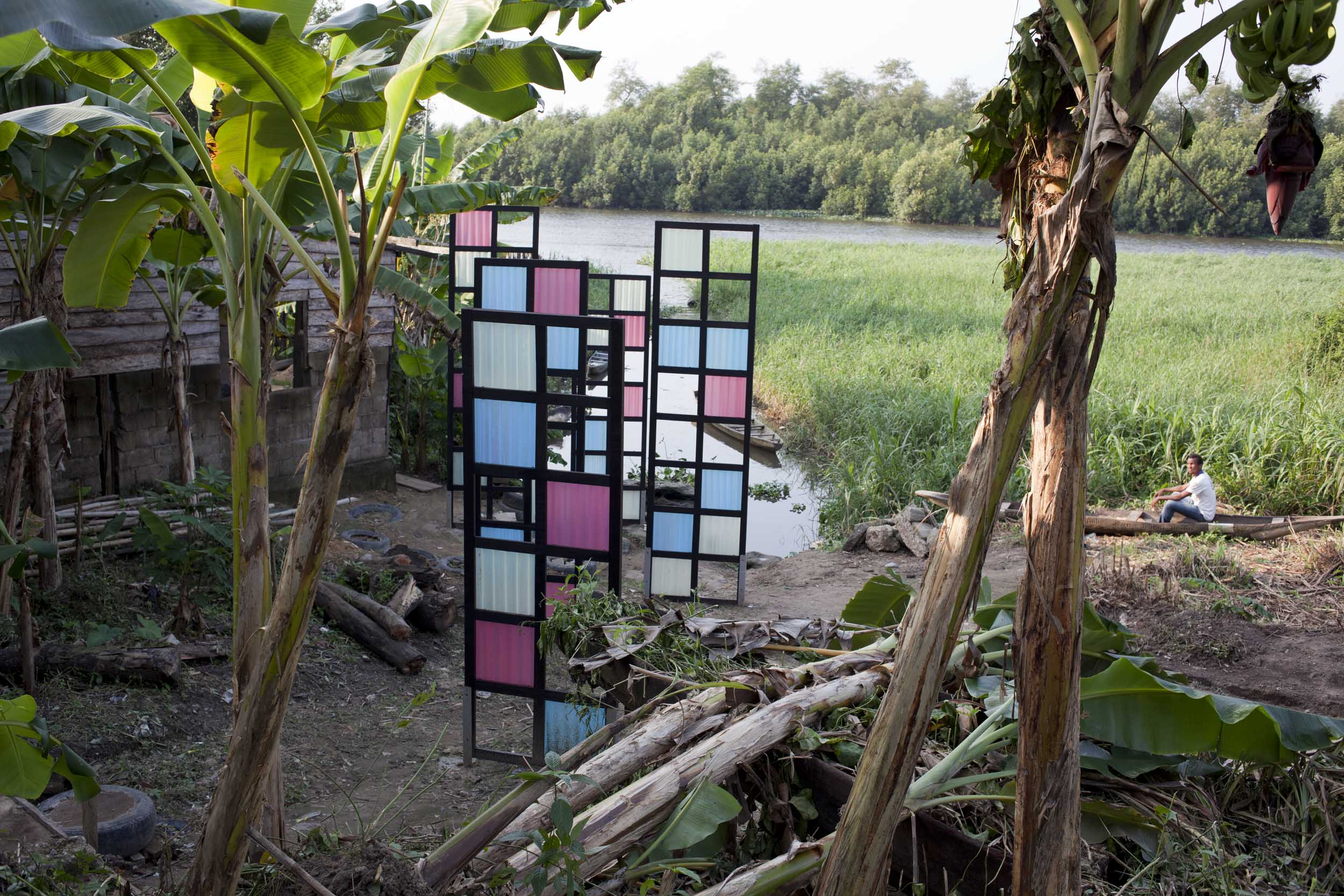

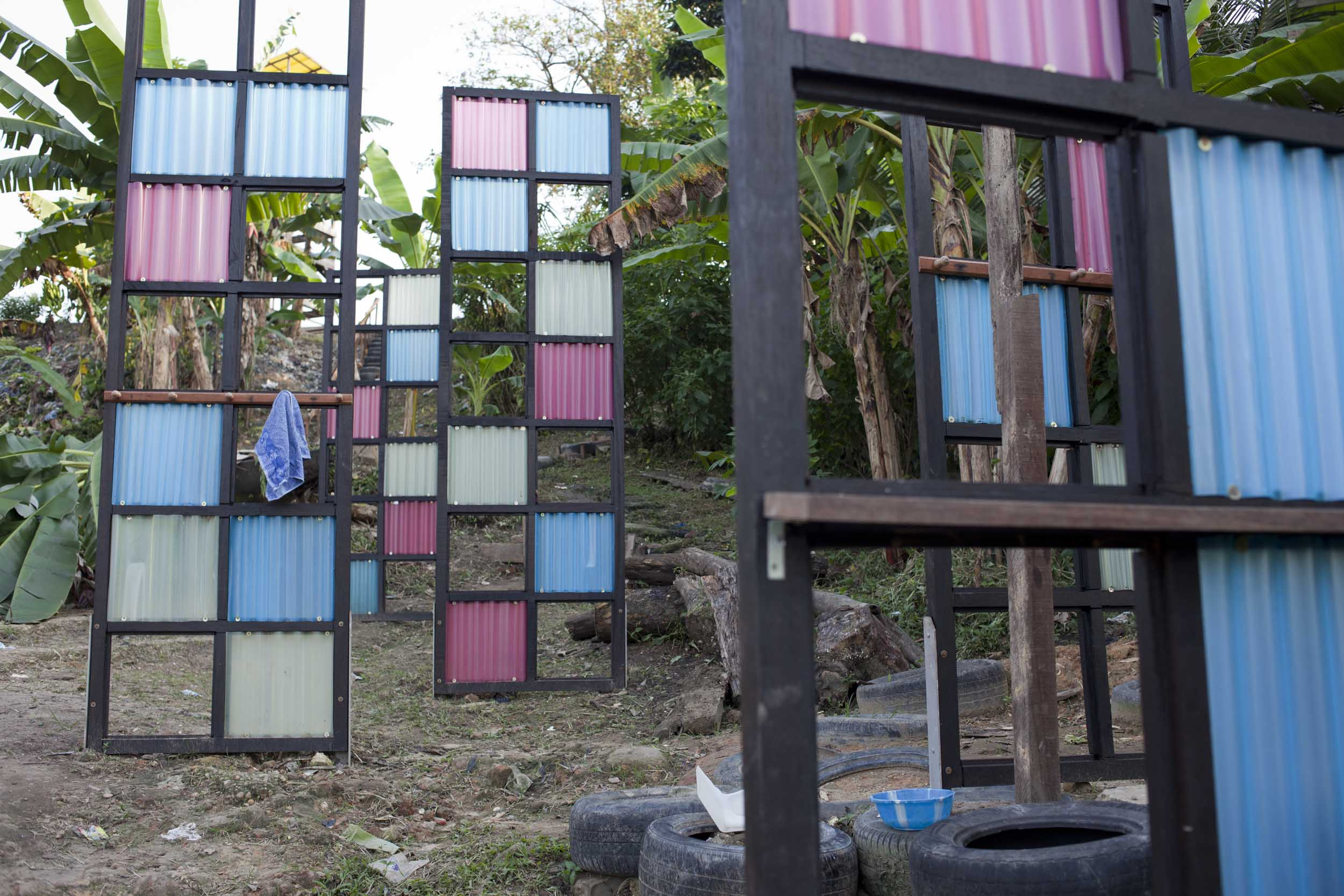

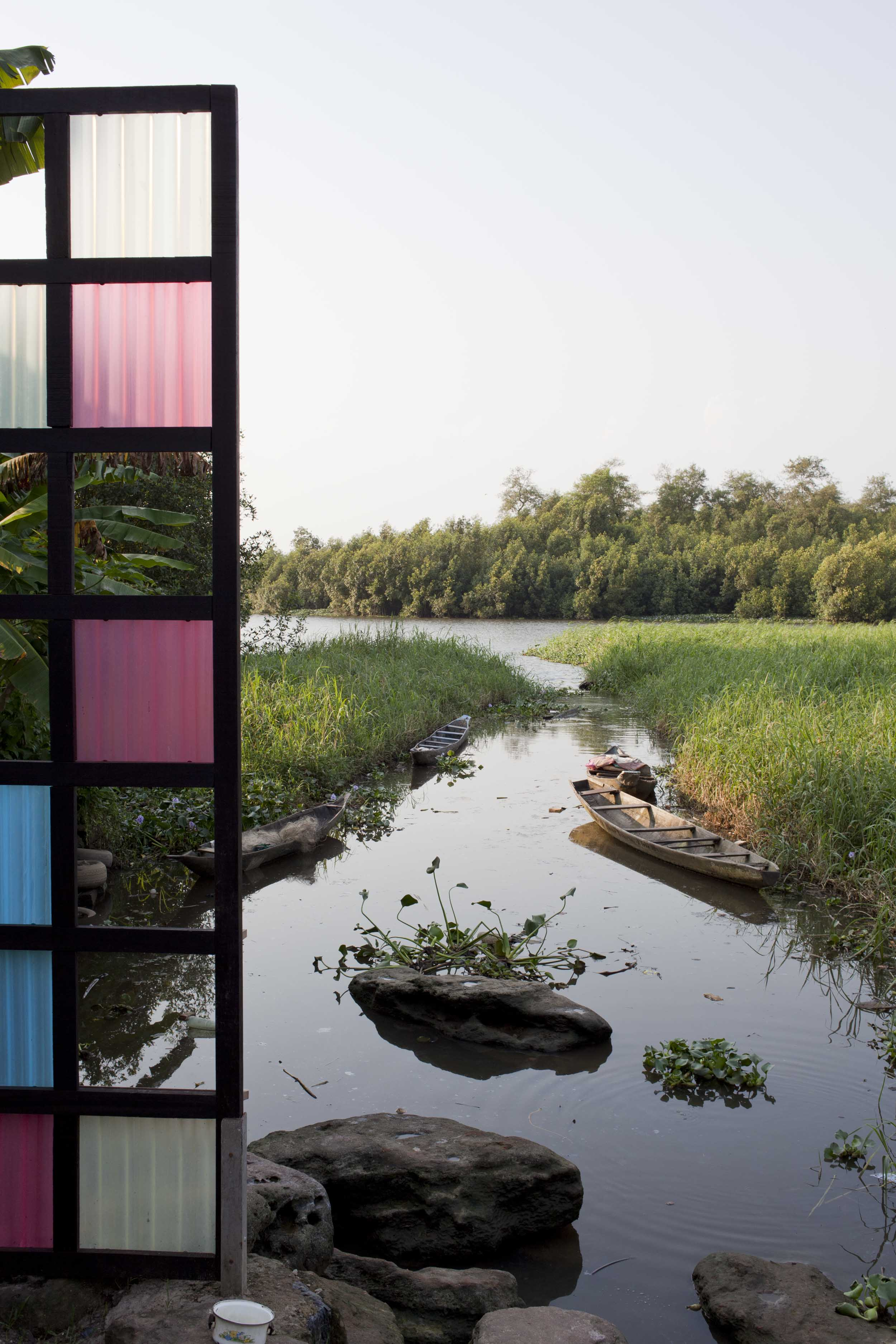

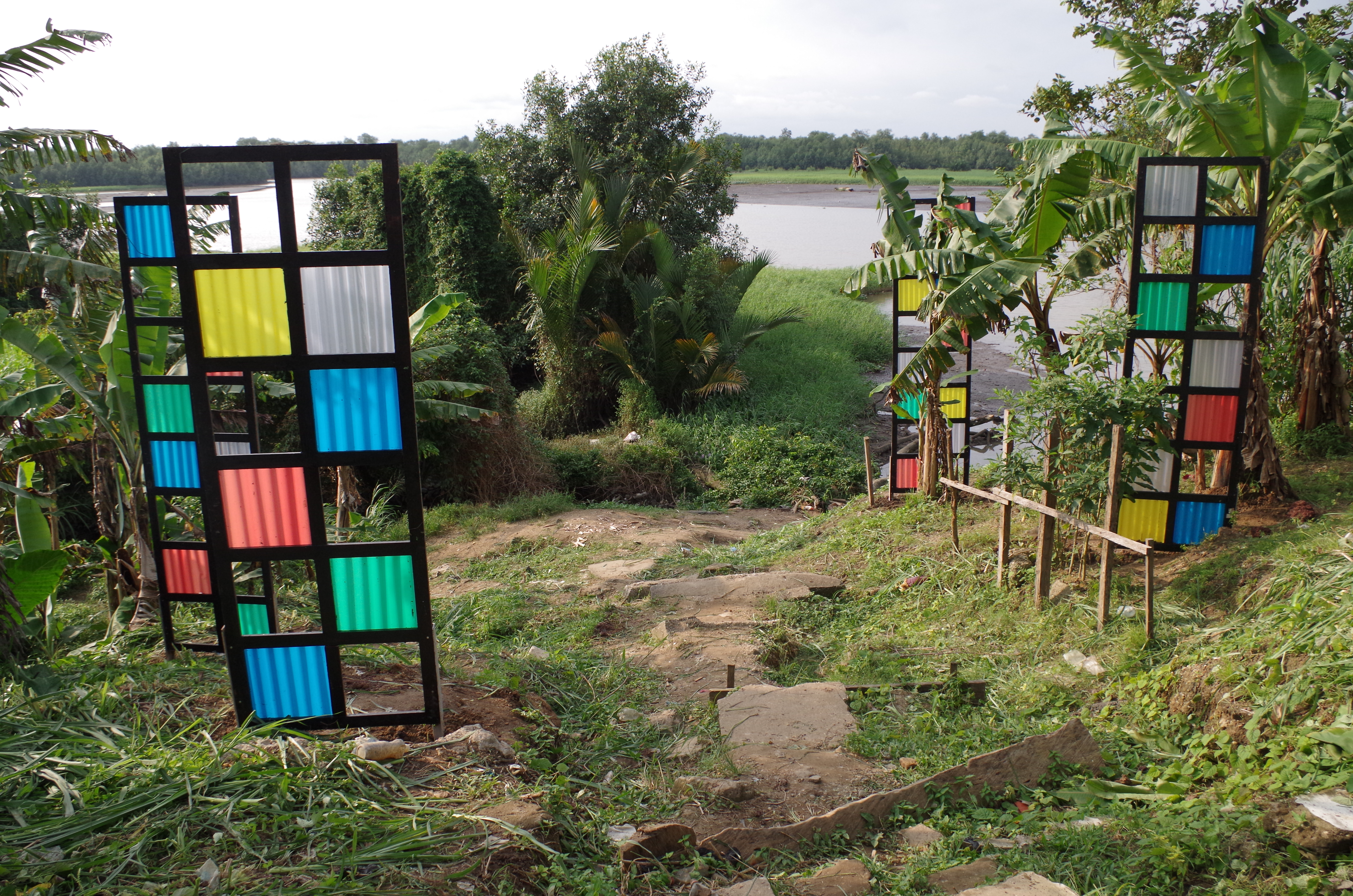

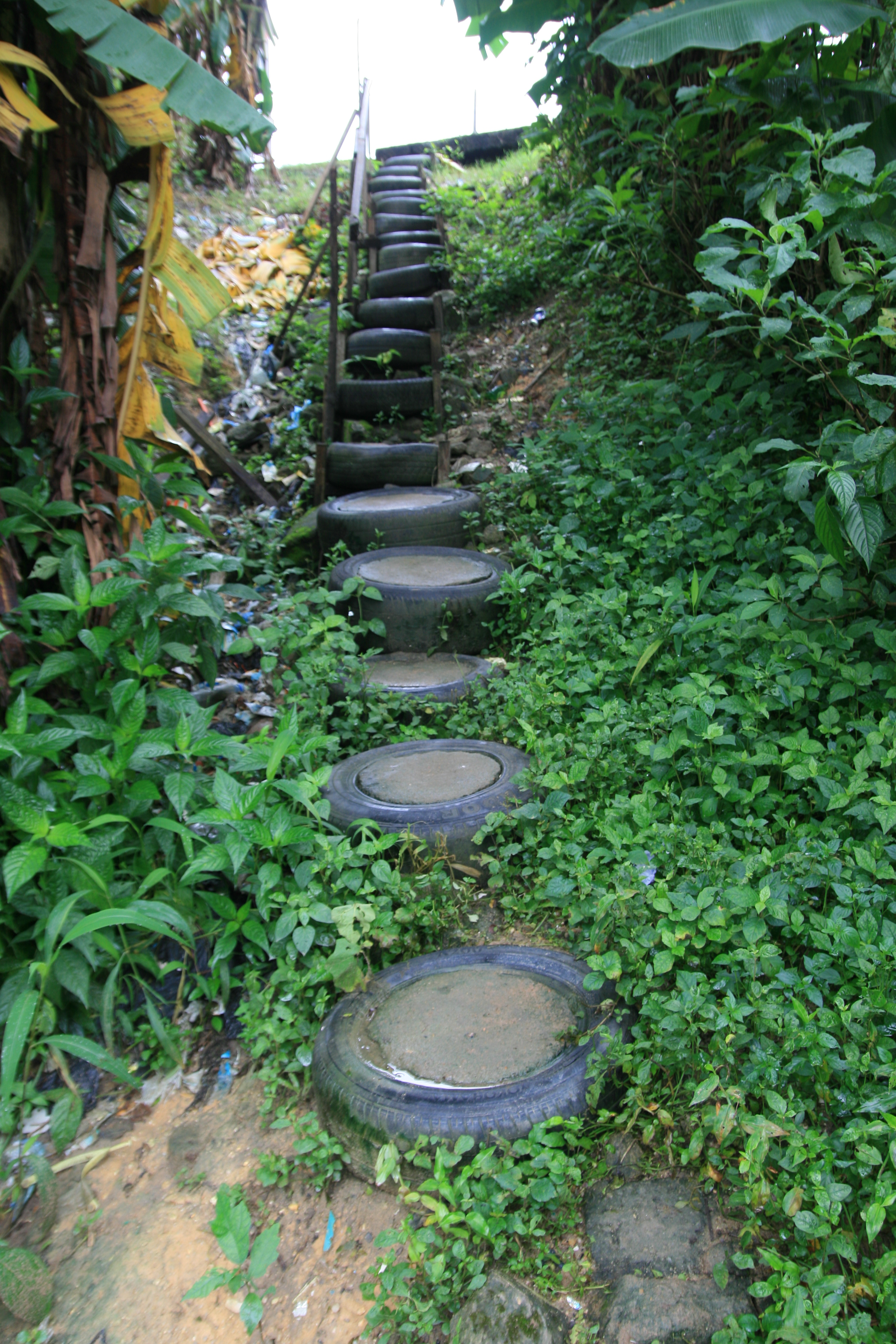

== See also ==
=== Bibliography ===
- Pensa, Iolanda (Ed.) 2017. Public Art in Africa. Art et transformations urbaines à Douala /// Art and Urban Transformations in Douala. Genève: Metis Presses. ISBN 978-2-94-0563-16-6
- Verschuren, K., X. Nibbeling and L. Grandin. (2012): Making Douala 2007–2103, Rotterdam, ICU art project
- Kouomou, A. and Youdjou, C. (2009): « Cap Sud 2010». In Liquid, n° 01, (Janvier - Fevrier - Mars 2009)
- Kaze, R. and Tchakam, S. (2009): «Les artistes et l'état d'avancement des Liquid Projects». In Liquid n°02, (Avril - Mai - Juin 2009)
- Kaze, R. and Tchakam, S. (2009): «Face à l'eau de Salifou Lindou». In Liquid n°03, (Juillet - Août - Septembre 2009).
- Kaze, R. and Tchakam, S. (2009): «Avancement des liquid projects». In Liquid n°04, (Octobre - Novembre - Décembre)
- Kaze, R. and Tchakam, S. (2010): «Avancement des liquid projects. Face à l'eau de Salifou Lindou». In Liquid n°05, (Janvier - Fevrier - Mars 2010)
- De La Chapelle, M. (2014). «On dirait le SUD......». In Africultures (January 23, 2014).
- Pensa, I. (2012): «Public Art and Urban Change in Douala». In Domus, (7 April 2012).
- Van Der Lan, B. and Jenkins R.S. (eds) (2011). Douala: Intertwined Architectures, The Netherland: ArchiAfrica
- Van der Lans, B. (2010): «Salon Urbaine de Douala 2010». In Architecture plus, (30 December 2010).
- Greenberg, K. (2012): «La ville en tant que site: création d’un public pour l’art contemporain en Afrique». In Carson Chan, Nadim Samman (Eds.) Higher Atlas / Au-delà de l’Atlas – The Marrakech Biennale (4) in Context. Sternberg Press
- Schemmel, A. (2011) « Main discourses of the 2nd Salon Urbain de Douala (SUD) in Cameroon seen by an Indian runner duck». In Andrea Heister, Bonaventure Soh Bejeng Ndikung, (Re-) Mapping the field: a bird's eye view on discourses. Berlin Germany, Savvy. Art, Contemporary, Africa.
- Schemmel, A. (2016): Visual Arts in Cameroon: A Genealogy of Non-formal Training, 1976–2014, Bamenda: Langaa Research & Publishing Common Initiative Group
- Lettera 27, (2013): «Trasformazioni urbane: l’edizione 2013 di SUD, a Douala» In Lettera 27. (29 Novembre 2013)
- Marta Pucciarelli (2014) Final Report. University of Applied Sciences and Arts of Southern Switzerland, Laboratory of visual culture.

=== Related articles ===
- List of public art in Douala
- Contemporary African art
