= Culture of Morocco =

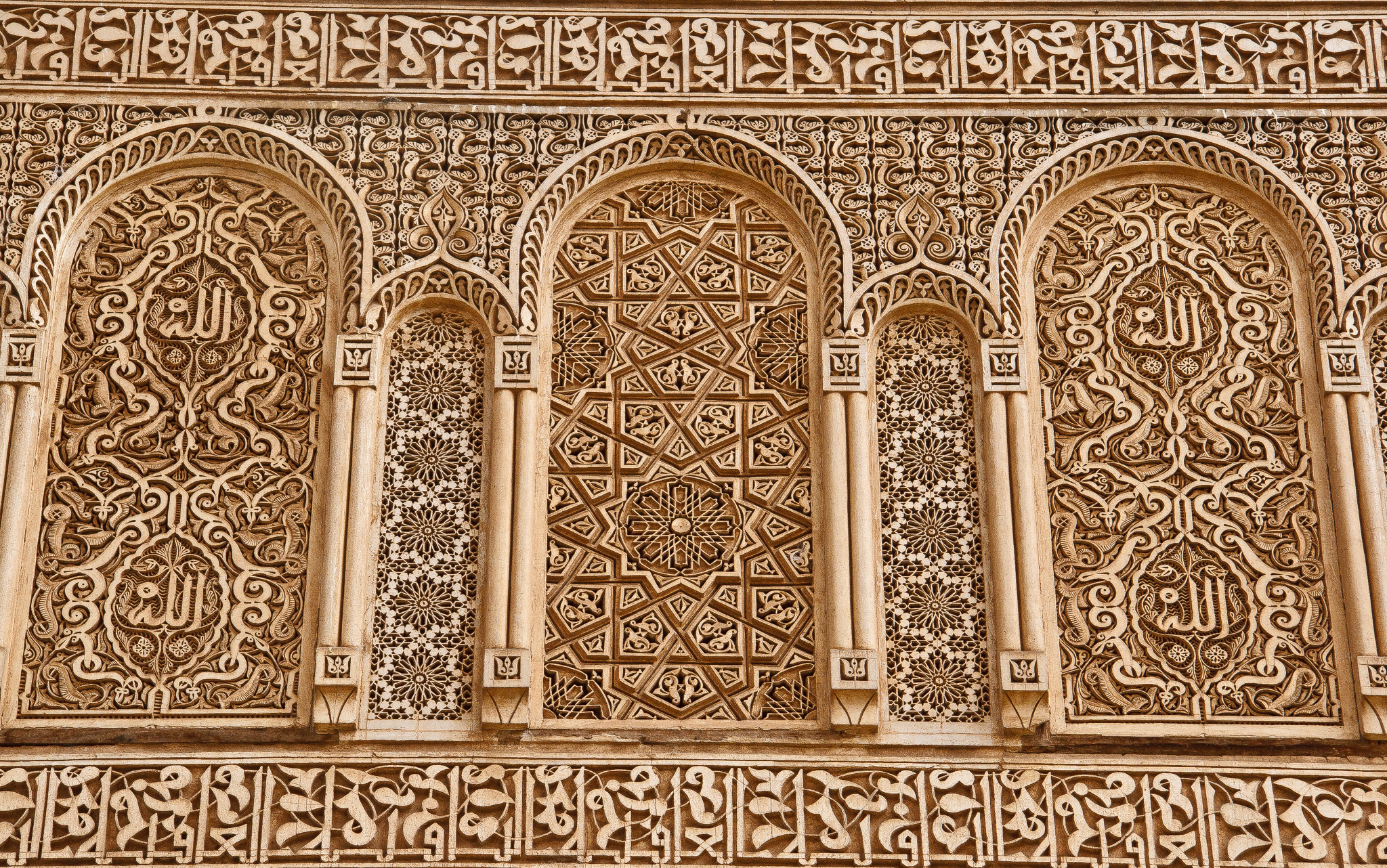
Stucco decoration in the Saadian Tombs of Marrakesh (16th century)

The culture of Morocco is primarily a blend of Arab and Berber cultures, with Andalusi, Mediterranean and Hebraic influences. It represents and is shaped by a convergence of influences throughout history. This sphere may include, among others, the fields of personal or collective behaviors, language, customs, knowledge, beliefs, arts, legislation, gastronomy, music, poetry, architecture, etc. While Morocco started to be stably predominantly Sunni Muslim starting from 9th–10th century AD, during the Almoravid period, a very significant Andalusi culture was imported, contributing to the shaping of Moroccan culture. Another major influx of Andalusi culture was brought by Andalusis with them following their expulsion from Al-Andalus to North Africa after the Reconquista. In antiquity, starting from the second century A.D and up to the seventh, a rural Donatist Christianity was present, along an urban still-in-the-making Roman Catholicism. All of the cultural super strata tend to rely on a multi-millennial aboriginal Berber substratum still present and dating back to prehistoric times.

The linguistic landscape of Morocco is complex. It generally tends to be horizontally diverse and vertically stratified. It is though possible to broadly classify it into two main components: Arab and Berber. It is hardly possible to speculate about the origin of the Berber language, as it is traced back to low antiquity and prehistoric times. The Semitic influence, on the contrary, can be fairly documented by archaeological evidence. It came in two waves: Canaanite, in its Punic, Carthaginian and Hebrew historic varieties, from the ninth century B.C and up to high antiquity, and Arabic, during the low Middle Ages, starting from the seventh century A.D. The two Semitic languages being close, both in syntax and vocabulary it is hard to tell them apart as to who influenced more the structure of the modern Moroccan Arabic dialect. The Arab conquerors having certainly encountered large romanized urban Punic population as they advanced. In any case, the linguistic and cultural identity of Morocco, just as its geography would predict, is the result of the encounter of three main circles: Arab, Berber, and Western Mediterranean European.

The two official languages of Morocco are Modern Standard Arabic and Standard Moroccan Berber. According to the 2024 general census, 92.7% of Moroccans speak Moroccan Arabic, while 24.8% speak a Berber language, in its Tarifit (3.2%), Central Atlas Tamazight (7.4%), or Tashelhit (14.2%) varieties. The census also indicated that 80.6% of Moroccans consider Arabic to be their native language, while 18.9% regard any of the various Berber languages as their mother tongue.

== History ==
=== Prehistoric ===
The remains of early Homo sapiens were found at Jebel Irhoud in 1991. Using modern dating techniques in 2017, they were found to be at least 300,000 years old, making them the oldest known examples of Homo sapiens discovered anywhere in the world.

=== Classical antiquity ===
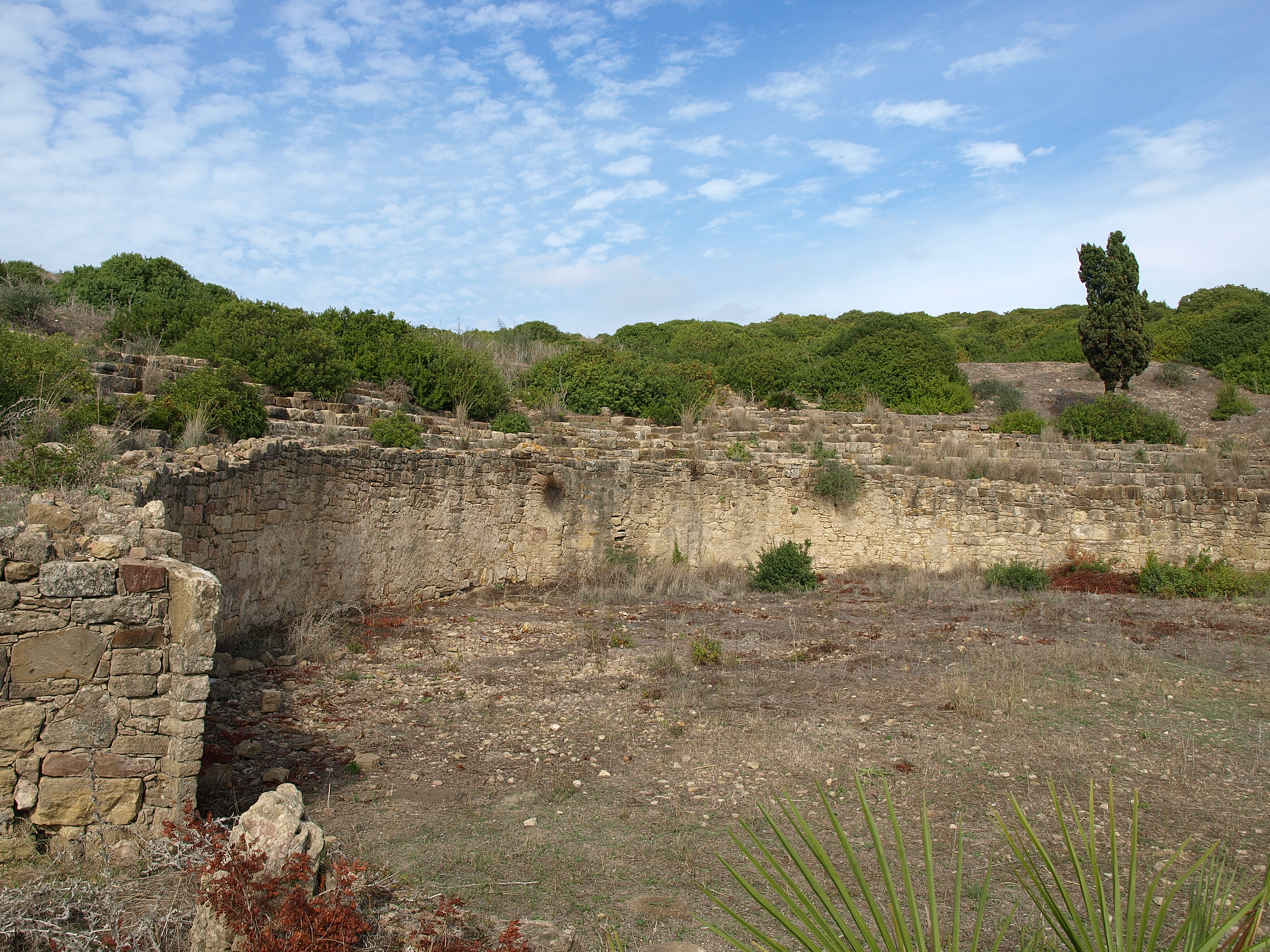
Ruins of the Roman theatre at Lixus near Larache

Major early settlements of the Phoenicians and Carthaginians included those at Chellah, Lixus and Mogador along the Atlantic coast by the 8th century BC. A temple to Melqart found in the vicinity of Lixus points to some presence of the Canaanite religion.

Some events and figures in the traditions of Greco-Roman mythology are associated with the territory that is now Morocco. Atlas is associated with the Atlas Mountains and is said to have been the first king of Mauretania, and Hercules was given the 12 impossible tasks including stealing "golden apples" from the garden of the Hesperides, purported to have been in or around Lixus.

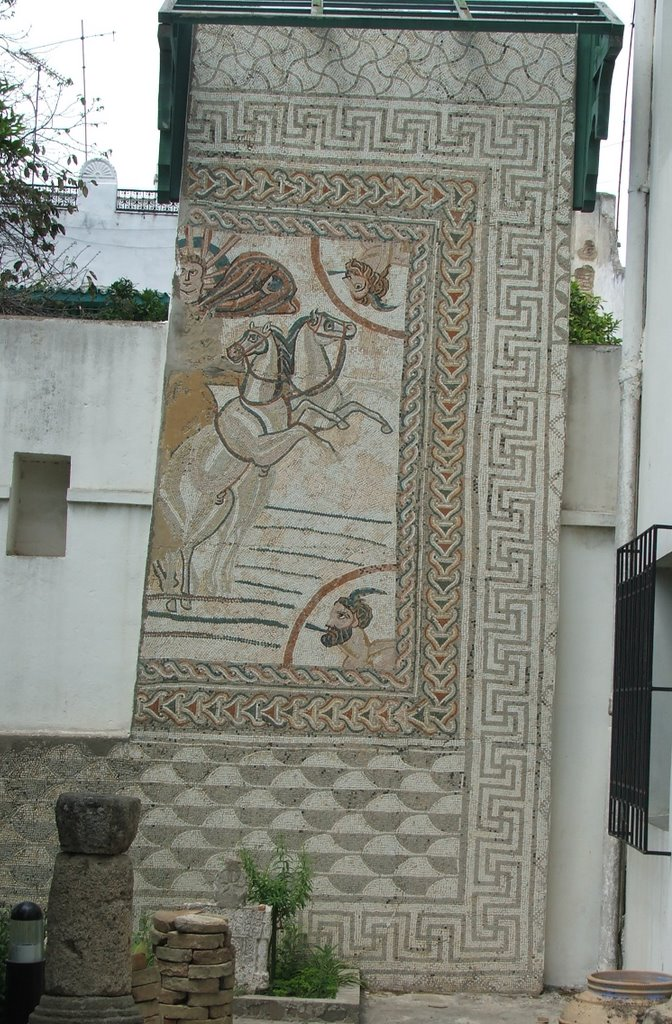
Roman mosaic of Tetuan (ancient Tamuda), we can see a Maurii with an ostrich feather in his hair and a curly beard

Ancient Morocco; Kingdom of Mauretania (IVth century B.C to 40 A.D)

During the pre-Roman era in Morocco (the Kingdom of Mauretania), numerous tribes inhabited the region. Strabo provides details about one of the major confederations known as the Mauri (or Maurusians). These people were nomadic, with each tribe led by a clan chief. They maintained distinct aesthetic customs, such as wearing elaborate adornments, gold jewelry, and ostrich feathers. They wore their hair braided and beaded, and kept their beards tightly curled. Like their neighbors in the Numidian kingdoms (the Masaesyli and Massyli), they were skilled warriors who wielded the machaera (a short sword) and the javelin, and were adept horsemen. Cavalry has always played a vital role in the culture of North African lands.

Berber leaders of and especially the kings of Mauretania (and Numidia) like Bocchus I practiced polygamy, maintaining large numbers of wives and fathering dozens of children, depending on their resources.

=== Muslim conquest of the Maghreb ===
In the period after the Muslim conquest of the Maghreb, the territory experienced Berber rebellion, which created smaller independent principalities independent of the Umayyad Caliphate, such as the Barghawata. This period was also the beginning of Arab migrations and gradual process of Arabization.

== Language ==
Modern Standard Arabic and Standard Moroccan Berber are the official languages of Morocco, while Moroccan Arabic is the national vernacular dialect; Berber languages are spoken in some mountain areas, such as Tarifit, spoken by 3.2%, Central Atlas Tamazight, spoken by 7.4%, and Tashelhit, spoken by 14.2%. Berber is a prominent element of the Moroccan cultural heritage. According to the 2024 census, 99.2%, or almost the entire literate population of Morocco, could read and write in Arabic, whereas only 1.5% of the population could read and write in Berber. Varieties of Judeo-Arabic have also traditionally been spoken in Morocco. Foreign languages, particularly French, English, and Spanish, are also spoken in urban centers such as Tangier or Casablanca. With all of these languages, code-switching is an omnipresent phenomenon in Moroccan speech and media.

=== Arabic ===
Classical Arabic, a formal rather than natural language, is used primarily in formal, academic, and religious settings. Moroccan Arabic, in its various regional and contextual forms, is used more often in casual situations, at home, and on the street. Hassaniya is another dialect of Arabic spoken in the south of Morocco.

=== Berber languages ===
There are three main varieties of Berber languages spoken in Morocco. Tashelhit (also known locally as Soussia) is spoken in southwest Morocco, including the High Atlas and the Sous valley. Central Atlas Tamazight is spoken in the Middle Atlas and southeast Morocco; for example, around Khenifra and Midelt. Tarifit is spoken in the Rif area of northern Morocco in towns like Nador, Al Hoceima, and Ajdir.

== Literature ==
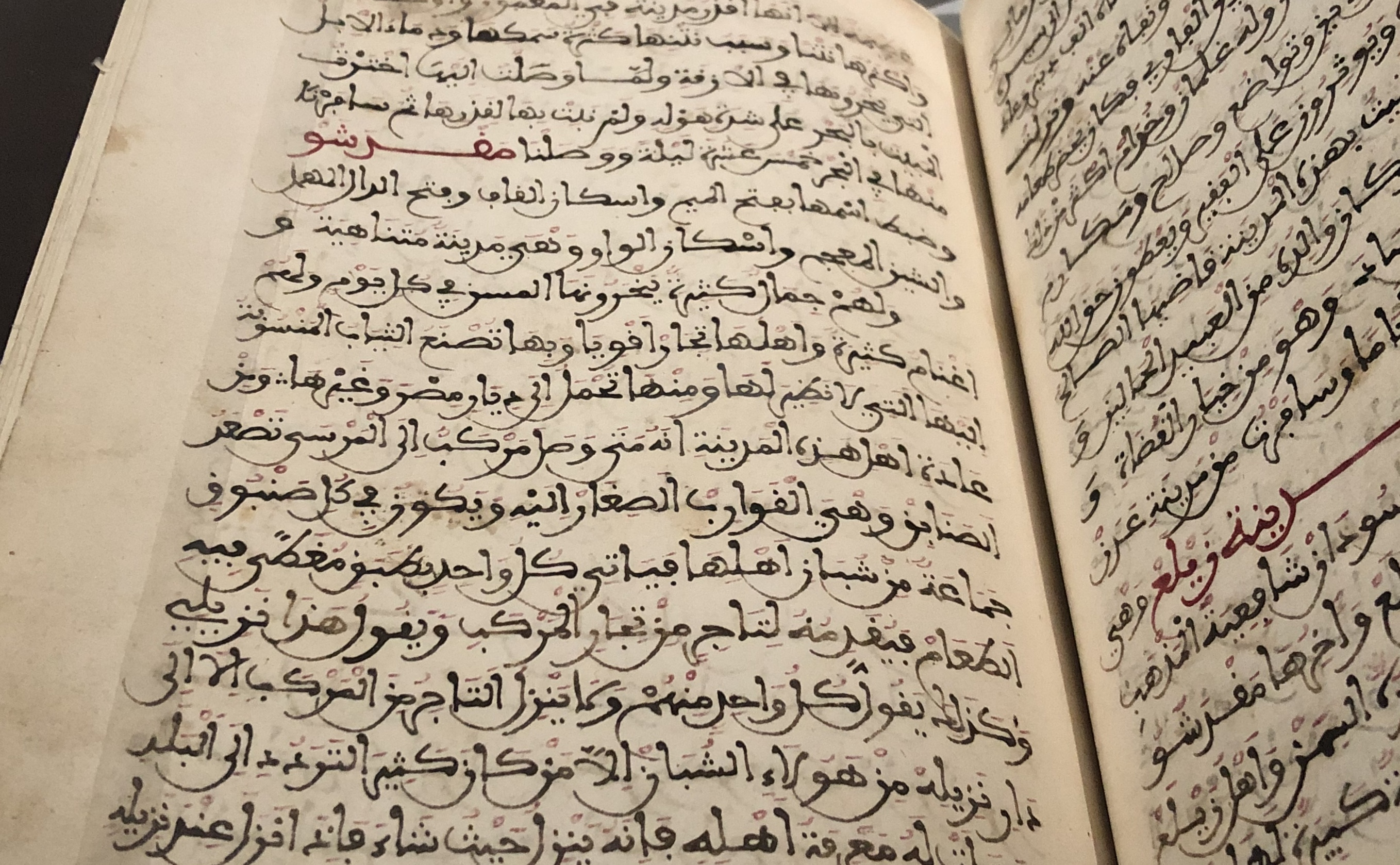
A 1484 manuscript copy of The Travels of Ibn Battuta, a work of rihla literature

Moroccan literature is the literature produced by people who lived in or were culturally connected to Morocco and the historical states that have existed partially or entirely within the geographical area that is now Morocco. Most of what is known as Moroccan literature was created since the arrival of Islam in the 8th century. Moroccan literature was historically and mainly written in Arabic.

== Music ==
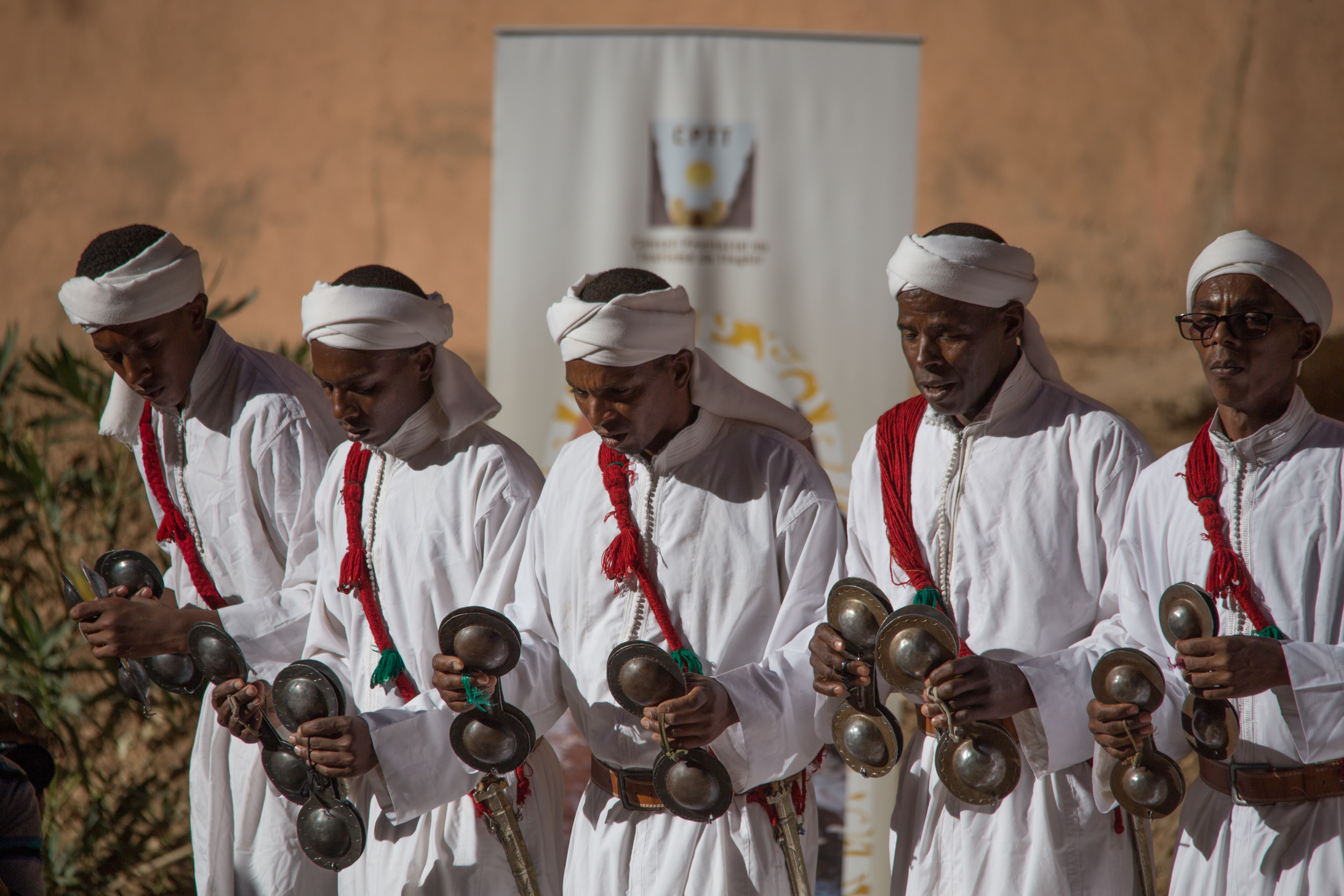
A group of Gnawa musicians performing in Zagora, southeastern Morocco

Moroccan music is characterized by its great diversity from one region to another. It includes Arabic music genres, such as chaabi and aita in the Atlantic plains (Doukkala-Abda, Chaouia-Ouardigha, Rehamna), melhoun in the cities associated with al-Andalus (Meknes, Fez, Salé, Tétouan, Oujda...), and Hassani in the Moroccan Sahara. There is also Berber music such as the Rif reggada, the ahidus of the Middle Atlas and the Souss ahwash. In the South there is also deqqa Marrakshia and gnawa. In addition, young people synthesize the Moroccan spirit with influences from around the world (blues, rock, metal, reggae, Moroccan rap, etc.).

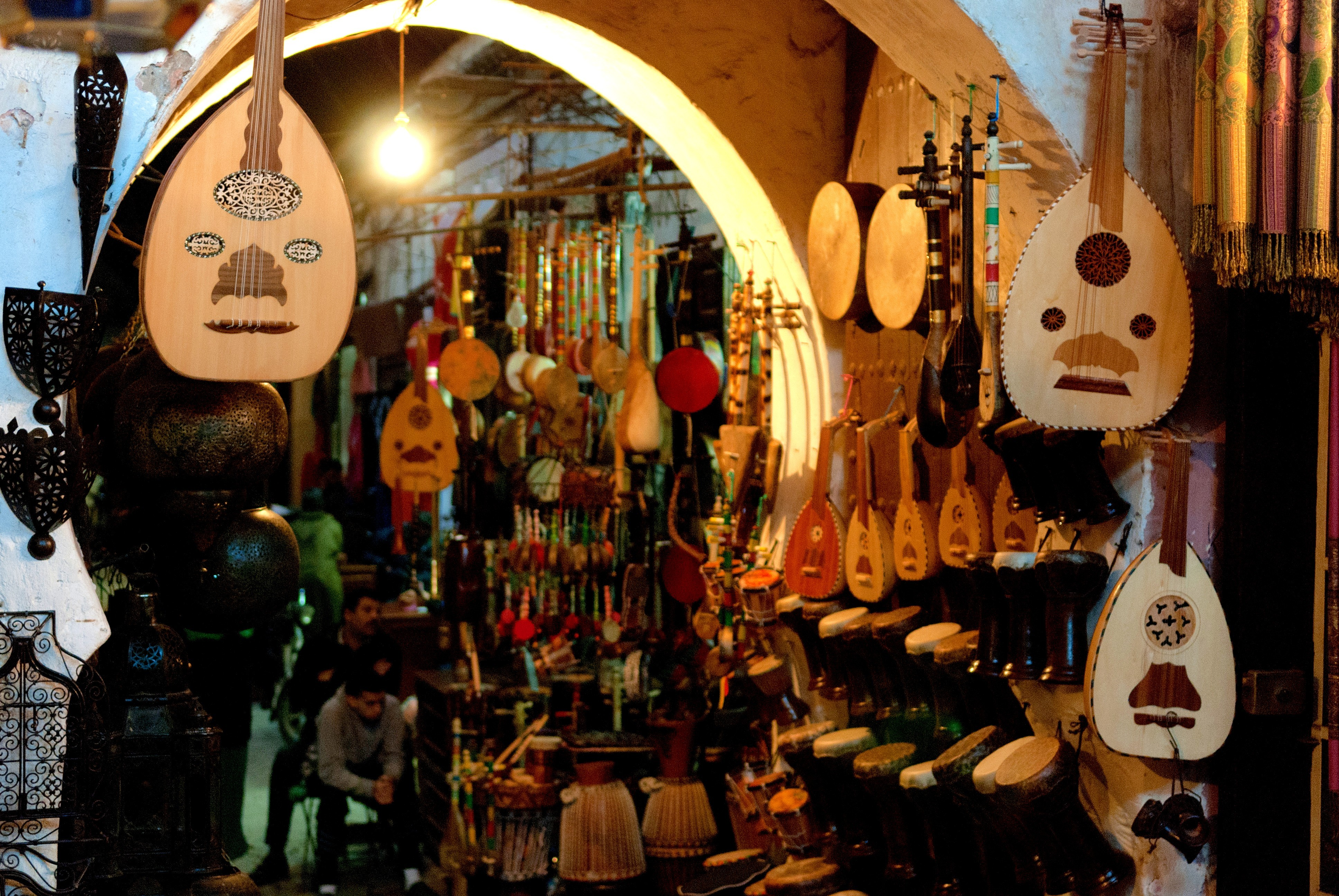
Ouds in a shop in Marrakesh

Tarab al-āla (طرب الآلة lit. "joy of the instrument") is a celebrated musical style in Morocco, a result of a large migration of Muslims from Valencia to Moroccan cities and especially Fez. The Fessi āla style uses the Moroccan forms of the Andalusi nubah melodical arrangements. While this musical style is sometimes popularly referred to as Andalusi music, specialists prefer the name āla (آلة "instrument") to differentiate it from the Sufi tradition of samā', which is purely vocal, and to deëmphasize its relationship with Europe. Mohammed al-Haik's 18th century songbook Kunnash al-Haik, is a seminal text of the āla tradition. Traditional songs such as Shams al-'Ashiya are still played at celebrations and formal events. Dar ul-Aala in Casablanca is a museum and conservatory dedicated to this musical heritage. Another style of music derived from the musical traditions of al-Andalus is Gharnati music.

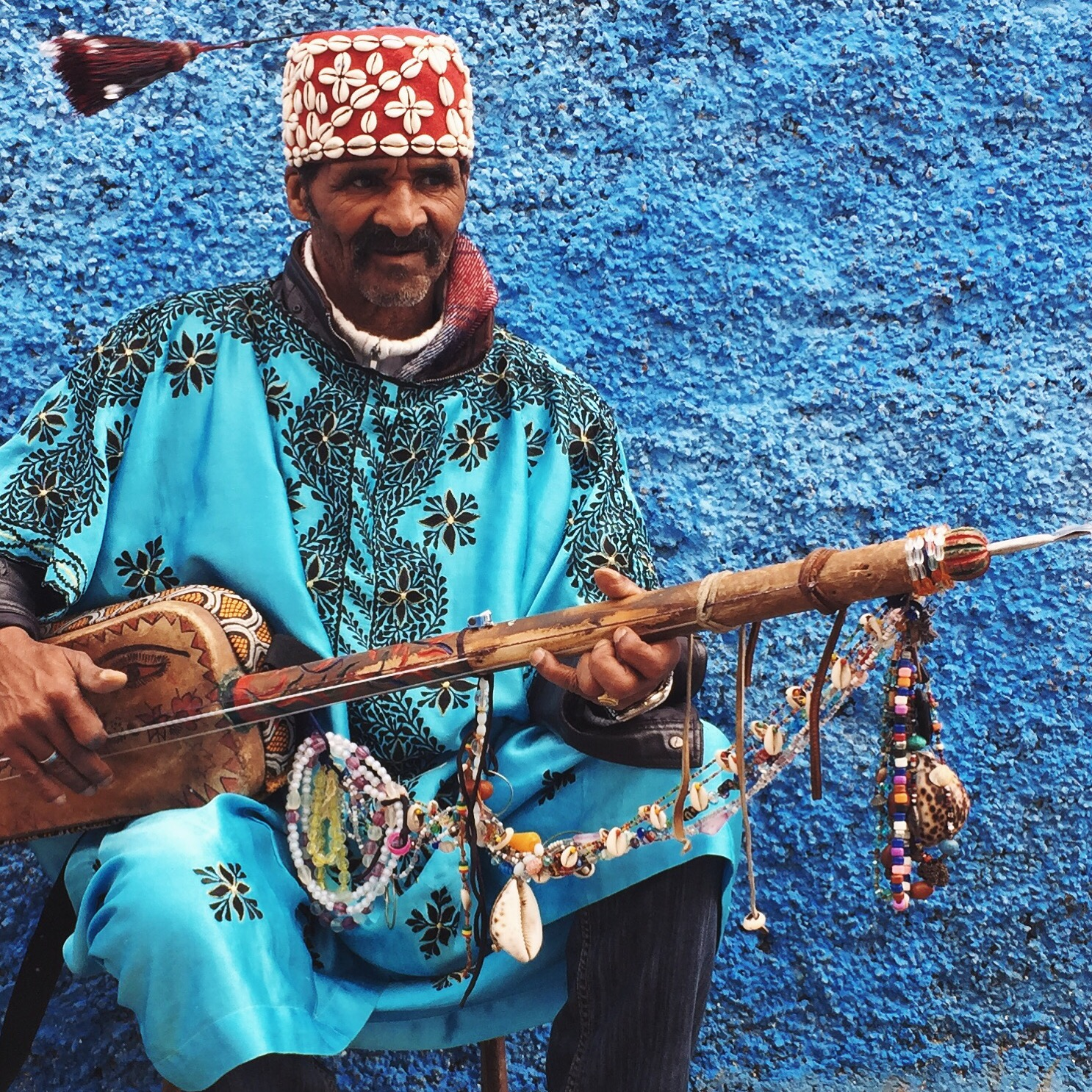
A Gnawa street performer wearing traditional Gnawi clothing in Rabat's Qasbat al-Widaya.

A genre known as Contemporary Andalusian Music and art is the brainchild of Morisco visual artist/composer/oudist Tarik Banzi, founder of the Al-Andalus Ensemble.

Chaabi ("popular") is a music consisting of numerous varieties which are descended from the multifarious forms of Moroccan folk music. Chaabi was originally performed in markets, but is now found at any celebration or meeting.

Popular Western forms of music are becoming increasingly popular in Morocco, such as fusion, rock, country, metal and, in particular, hip hop.

Morocco participated in the 1980 Eurovision Song Contest, where it finished in the penultimate position.

== Visual arts ==
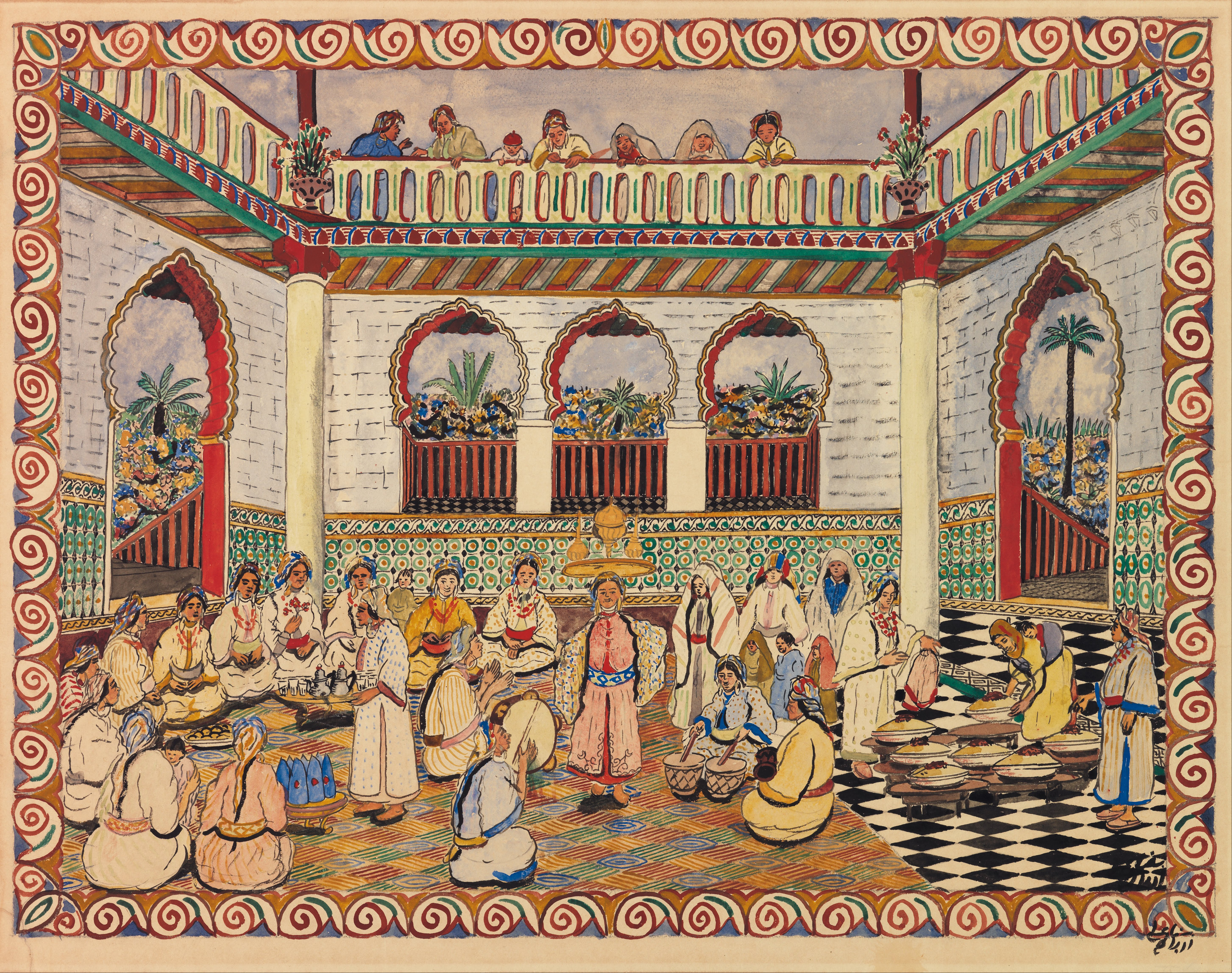
Festival Scene: a watercolor by Muhammad Ben Ali Rabati, one of Morocco's first painters

A 19th century copy of Muhammad al-Jazuli's Dala'il al-Khayrat copied by the master calligrapher Muhammad Bin Al-Qasim al-Qundusi in his improvised Maghrebi script.

The decorative arts have a long and important history in Morocco. One of the traditional elements of artistic expression in Morocco is Maghrebi-Andalusian art and architecture. Carved plaster Arabesques, zellige tilework, carved wood, and other expressions of Islamic geometric patterns are typical features of this style. Maghrebi Arabic script is an important feature of the history of visual art in Morocco. While some aspects of Maghrebi script are codified and prescribed, there have also been innovations, such as those by the 19th century calligrapher Muhammad al-Qandusi. Muhammad Ben Ali Rabati was one of the first Moroccans to paint in a European style.

=== Modern art ===
Hamid Irbouh identifies three groups within Moroccan modernism: the Populists, the Nativists, and the Bipictorialists. Among the Populists—usually self-trained artists who received support from French and American patrons and depicted everyday vernacular life—were artists such as Ahmed Louardighi, Hassan El Glaoui, Ahmed Drissi, and Fatima Hassan El Farouj. The Nativists—active in the 1960s and led by Farid Belkahia and other members of the Casablanca School, such as Mohamed Melehi and Mohamed Chabâa—sought to break entirely with the West in general and with France in particular. The Bipictorialists, including Ahmed Cherkaoui and Jilali Gharbaoui, entered in dialog with Moroccan, French, and Western influences, working toward a reconciliation of the various dimensions of postcolonial Moroccan identity.

=== Contemporary art ===
Contemporary art in Morocco is still developing. with considerable potential for growth. Since the 1990s–2000s Moroccan cities have welcomed institutions that contribute to the diffusion of contemporary art and the visual arts: L'appartement 22 and Radio Apartment 22 in Rabat, the Cinémathèque de Tanger in Tangier, La Source du Lion in Casablanca, Dar Al-Ma'mûn residency and center, the Marrakech Art Fair, and the Marrakech Biennale, all in Marrakesh.

Local art galleries such as Galerie Villa Delaporte, Atelier 21, Galerie Matisse and Galerie FJ are also platforms showing contemporary artwork and contributing to its development.

The global art market also influences the development and visibility of contemporary art in Morocco; international exhibitions such as "Africa Remix" (2004) and "Uneven Geographies" (2010) featured contemporary artists from North Africa, including Moroccan ones. Regional events such as the Dakar Biennale (or Dak'Art – Biennale de l'Art Africain Contemporain), a major contemporary African art exhibition, gives greater visibility to artists from the African continent.

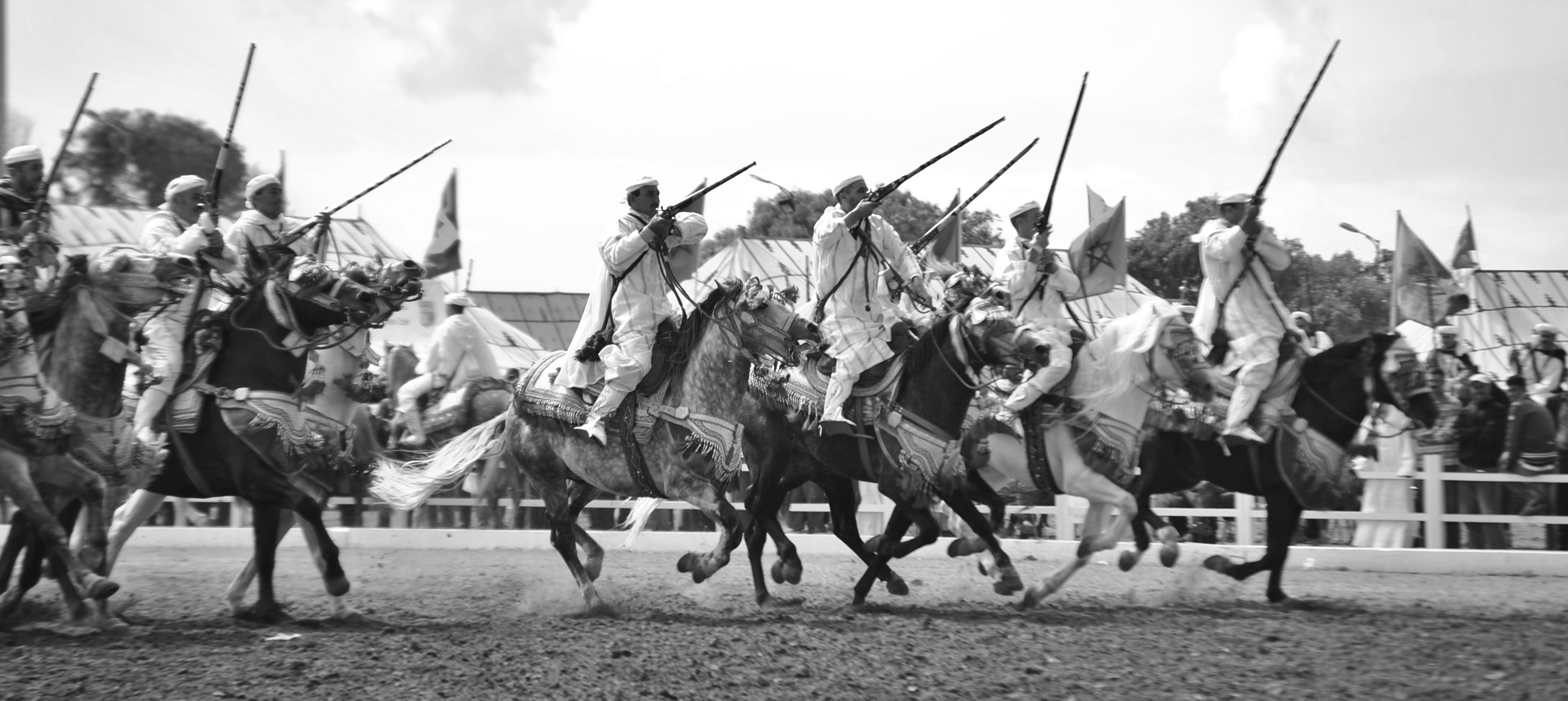
Taburida, a traditional Arab exhibition of horsemanship performed during festivals

==== Moroccan artists and their initiatives ====
Artists born in Morocco or with Moroccan origins include Mounir Fatmi, Latifa Echackhch, Mohamed El Baz, Bouchra Khalili, Majida Khattari, Mehdi-Georges Lahlou, and Younes Baba-Ali.

Moroccan artists have devised several initiatives to help develop a contemporary art market in the country. For example, Hassan Darsi created La Source du Lion in 1995, an art studio that welcomes artists-in-residence, and Bouchra Khalili and Yto Barrada founded the Cinémathèque de Tanger in 2003, which is dedicated to promoting Moroccan cinematographic culture. A group of seven Moroccan artists, among them Amina Benbouchta, Hassan Echair, Jamila Lamrani, Safâa Erruas and Younès Rahmoun, formed "Collectif 212" to exhibit their work at Le Cube, an independent art room. Their first major show was in 2006 at the exhibition Un Siècle de peinture au Maroc [A century of painting in Morocco] when the new premises of the French Institute of Rabat (L'Institut Français de Rabat) were officially opened. They committed to creating artistic experiences in the context of Moroccan culture, as well as collaborating with other artists such as Hicham Benohoud.

The young local artists Batoul Shim and Karim Rafi participated in the "Working for Change" project, which aims to create art expressive of Moroccan culture, during the 2011 Venice Biennale.

==== Art market ====
There is a market for modern & contemporary art. The art movement began over 50 years ago at the center of Marrakesh, in the market place of Jemaa el-Fnaa, when a group of abstract artists got together and exhibited their work. The exhibit lasted for 10 days and is considered the beginning of a movement in modern and contemporary art. It has gained recognition throughout the African continent and globally.

Marrakesh has emerged as the "art capital" of Morocco. It houses numerous art museums including the Farid Belkahia Museum, named after one of the leading Jemaa el-Fna artists who died in 2014. Marrakesh is home to the Yves Saint Laurent Museum and hosts the annual Marrakech International Film Festival.

Tangier is another center for art, producing renowned artists like Ahmed Yacoubi and Abdellatif Zine and Mohamed Hamri whose works are displayed around the world.

=== Tattooing ===
Tattooing was once a popular tradition in the Maghreb, particularly among rural Berber populations.

== Cuisine ==
Couscous is traditionally enjoyed on Friday, the holy day in Islam. Garnished with vegetables and chickpeas, it is served communally.

Moroccan cuisine is generally a mix of Arab, Andalusi, Berber and Mediterranean cuisines with slight European and sub-Saharan influences. Berbers had food staples such as figs, olives and dates and prepared lamb and poultry dishes frequently. This has heavily influenced Moroccan cuisine as all of these are used in abundance. Morocco is known for dishes such as couscous, tajine, and pastilla. Moroccan cuisine uses many herbs, including cilantro, parsley, and mint; spices such as cinnamon, turmeric, ginger, cumin, and saffron; and produce such as tomatoes, onions, garlic, zucchini, bell peppers, and eggplant. One of the defining features of Moroccan cuisine is the interplay between sweet and savory flavors, as exemplified by tfaya, a mix of caramelized onions, butter, cinnamon, sugar, and raisins often served with meat.

Historically, couscous has been the staple of the Moroccan diet. On special occasions, more complex meals like the traditional Moroccan pastilla and some special pastries such as gazelle ankles and briwates are served for guests. Mint tea, called atay in Morocco, is commonly regarded as the national beverages. Coffee is also universally enjoyed from espresso to cappuccinos.

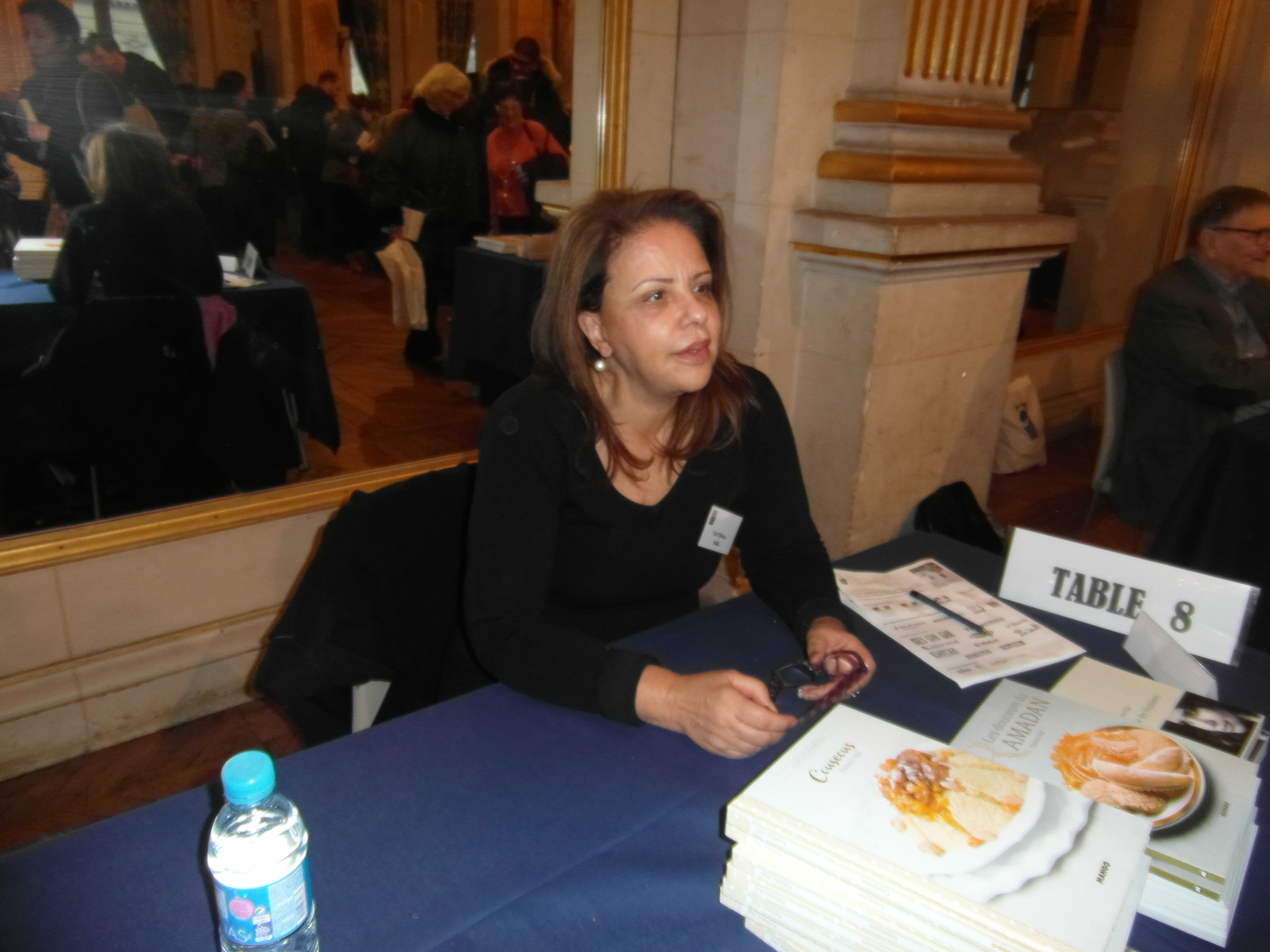
Fatema Hal

Introduced to Morocco in the 18th century, the Moroccan mint tea has become a national institution. Consumed at any time of day in traditional colorful glasses, it is more than just a beverage; it fosters social interaction and conviviality, whether in the intimacy of the family living room, at grand celebrations, or even out on the street.

Moroccan cuisine is world-renowned and highly acclaimed, particularly in France, where it was introduced by the Moroccan diaspora. Prominent figures have emerged, such as the Moroccan chef and ethnologist Fatéma Hal, who runs the famous Royal Mansour restaurant in Paris. She explains that Moroccan cuisine is a true art form—kept alive by women for centuries—that engages all the senses: sight, smell, and touch.

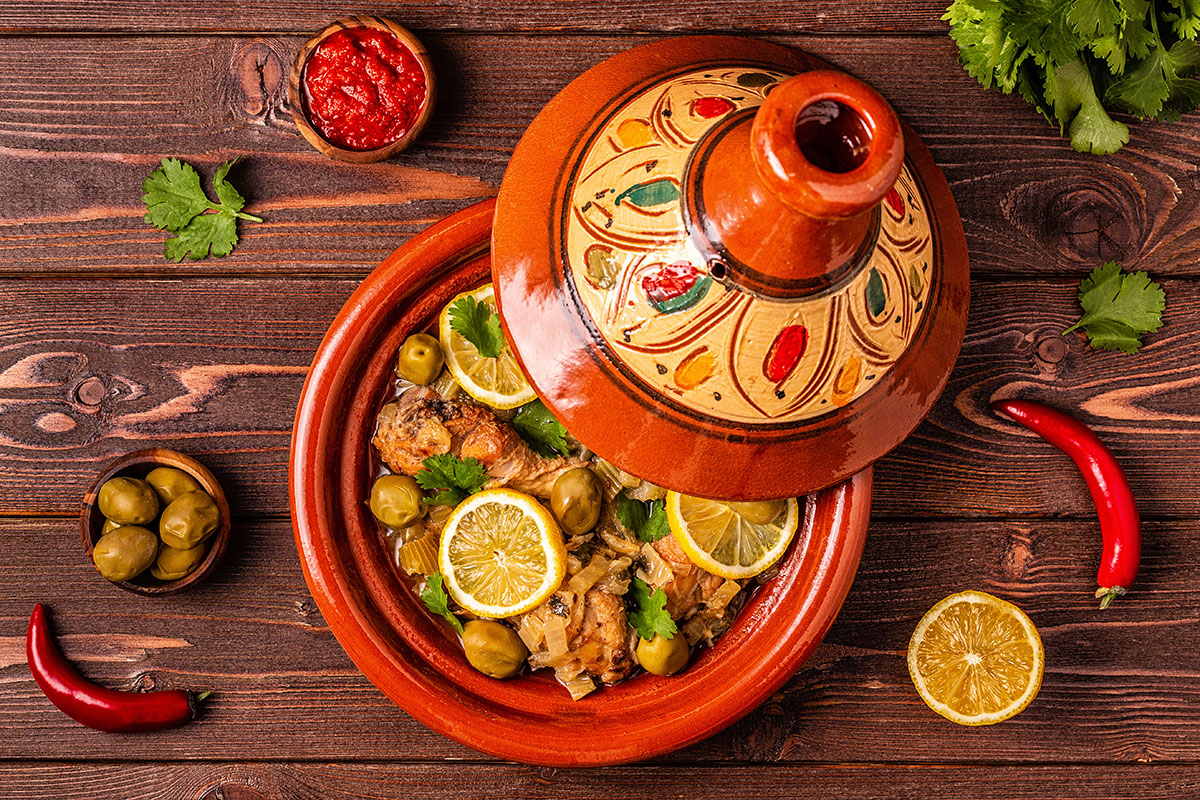
Tajine Djaj Zitoune; one of the numerous Moroccan Tajine and the most well known. It is made of chicken, olives and candied lemon

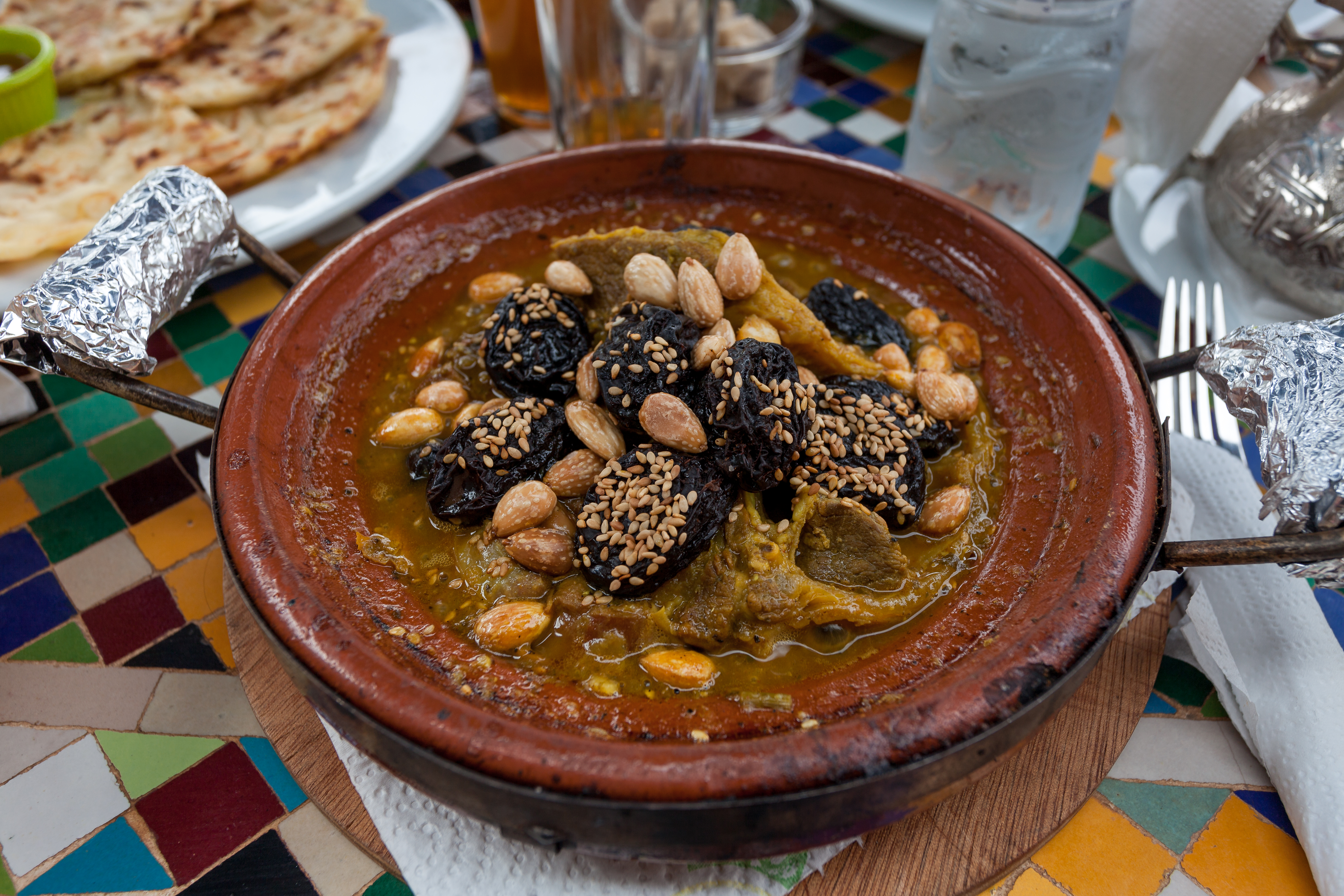
The sweet and savory luxurious Tajine Lham Bel Berkouk, made with lamb, prunes, apricots and almonds. It is a consumed during Moroccan weddings

Moroccan Couscous

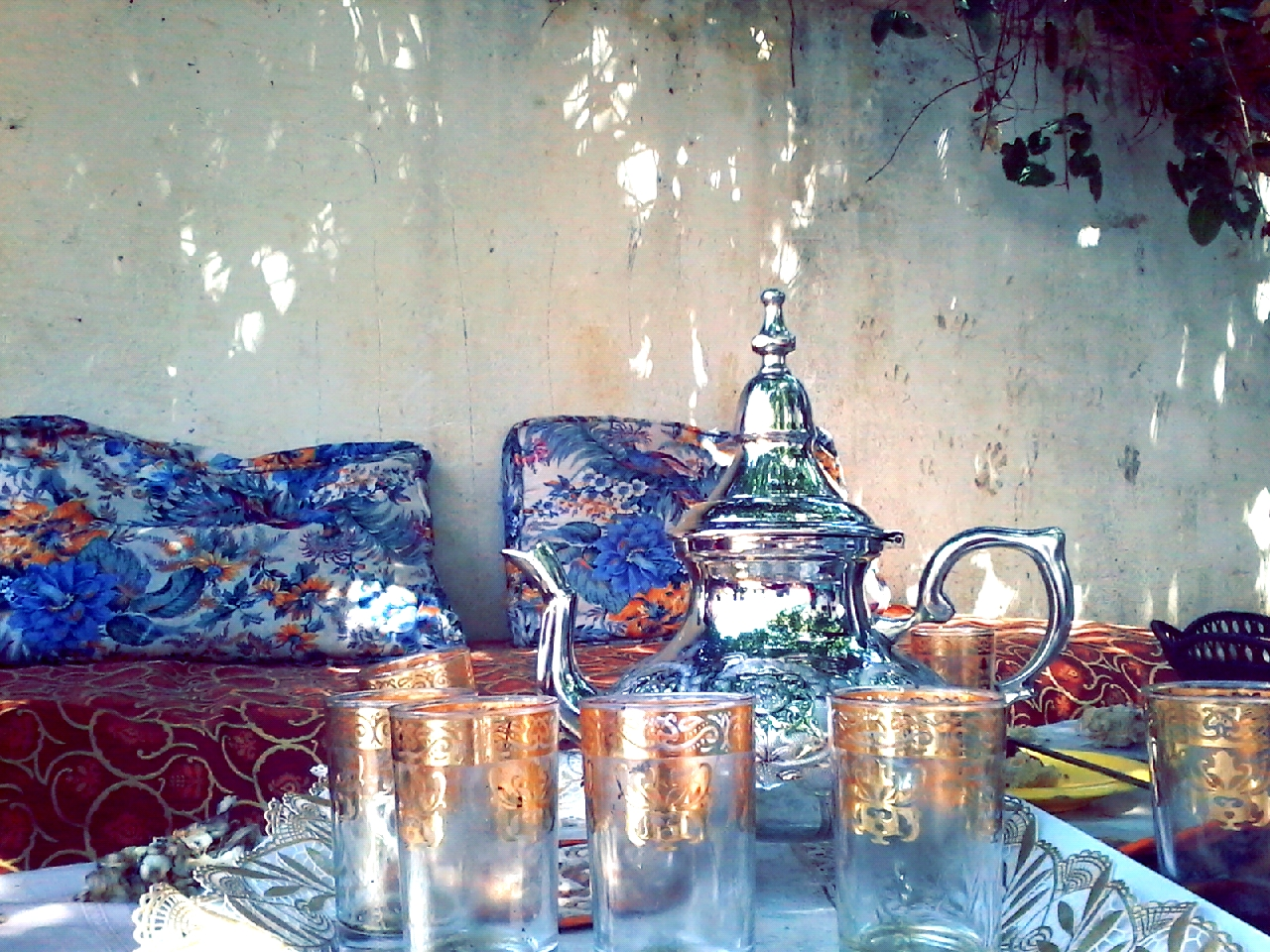
The Moroccan mint tea

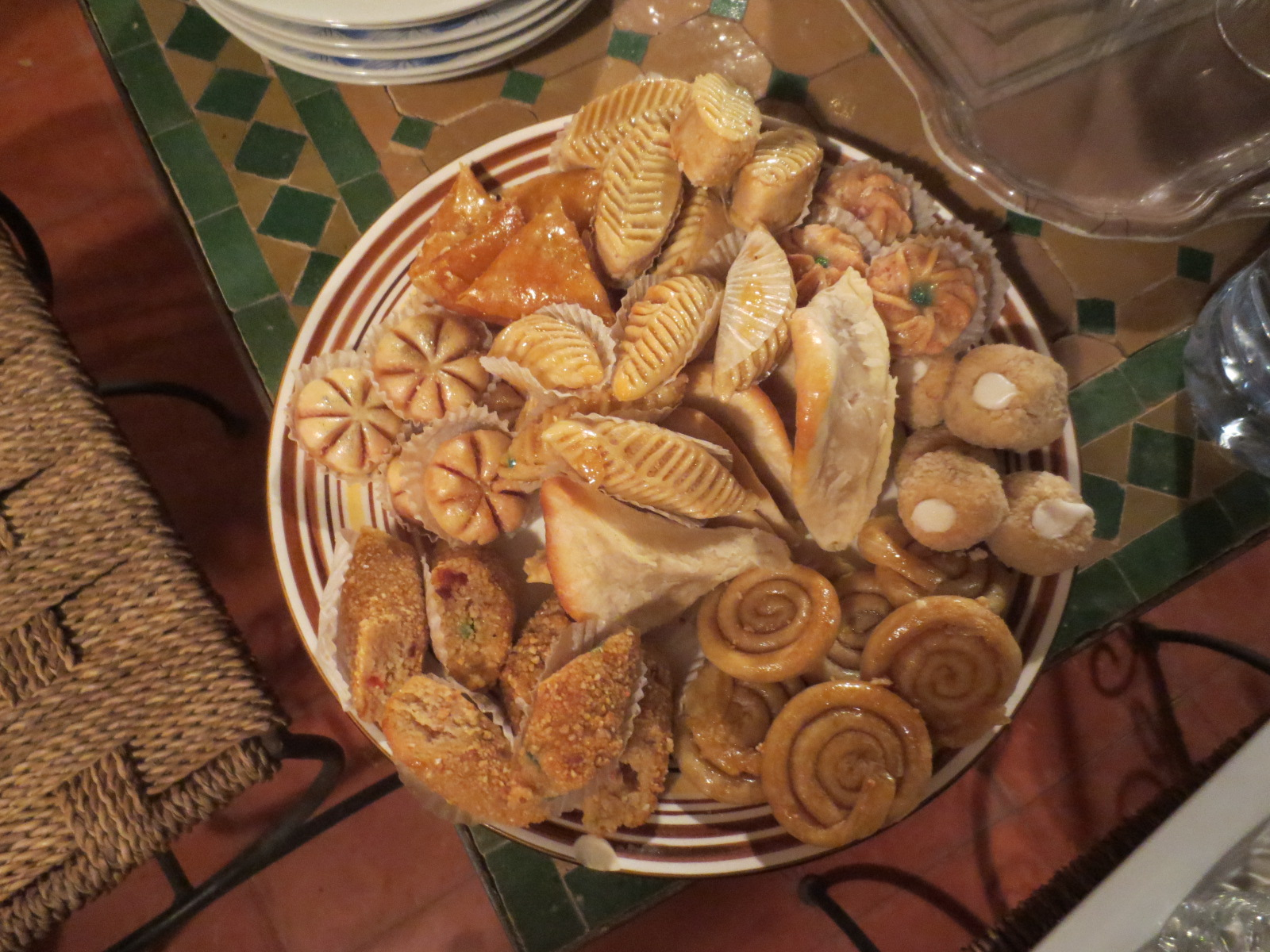
A plate of Moroccan pastries. Almonds, sugar, honey are the sesame seeds and orange blossoms are the main ingredients for the preparations of sweets, cakes, pastries in Morocco

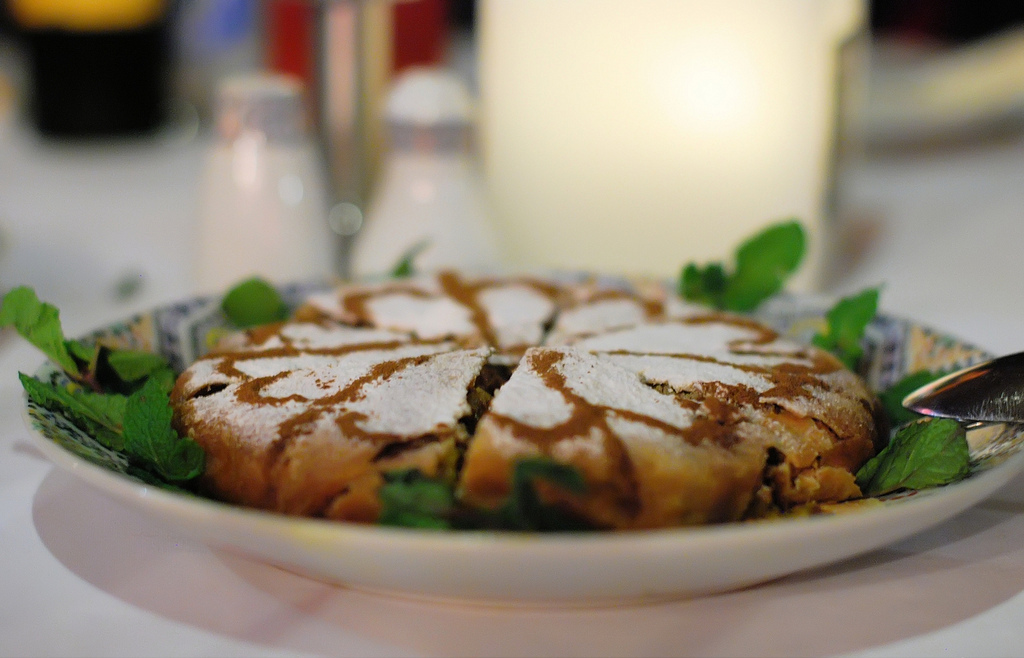
Pastilla/Bstlla is an other dish that can be either salty or sweet and savory. A regal dish from the city of Fez; it is a pie dusted with sugar and filled with beef (or pigeon, following the medieval recipe). A version with seafood, lemon, and vermicelli also exists.

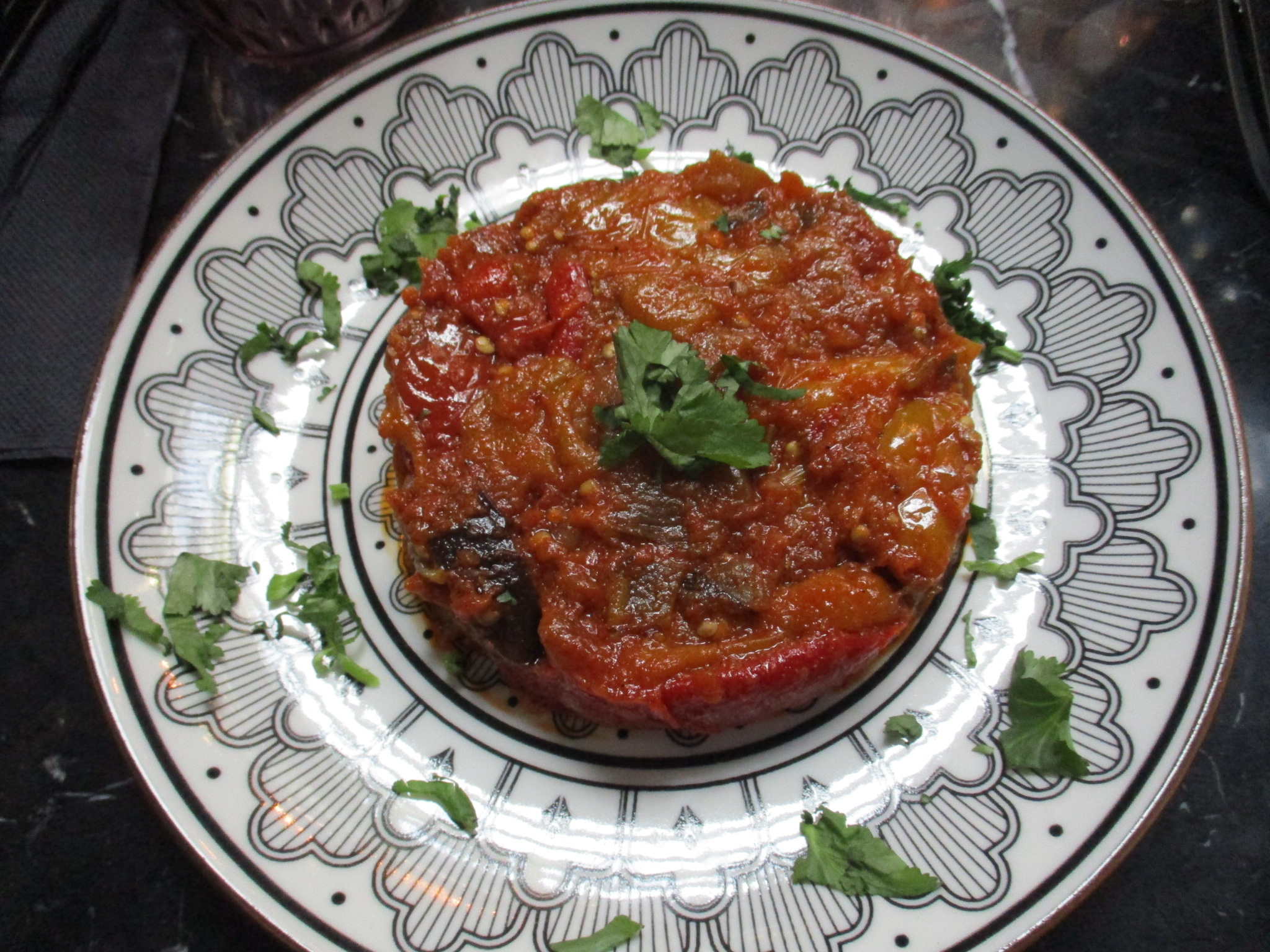
Zaalouk is an eggplant dip served as a cold appetizer; made with eggplant, tomatoes, and aromatic herbs, and drizzled with olive oil, it is enjoyed throughout Morocco and across other Mediterranean cultures.

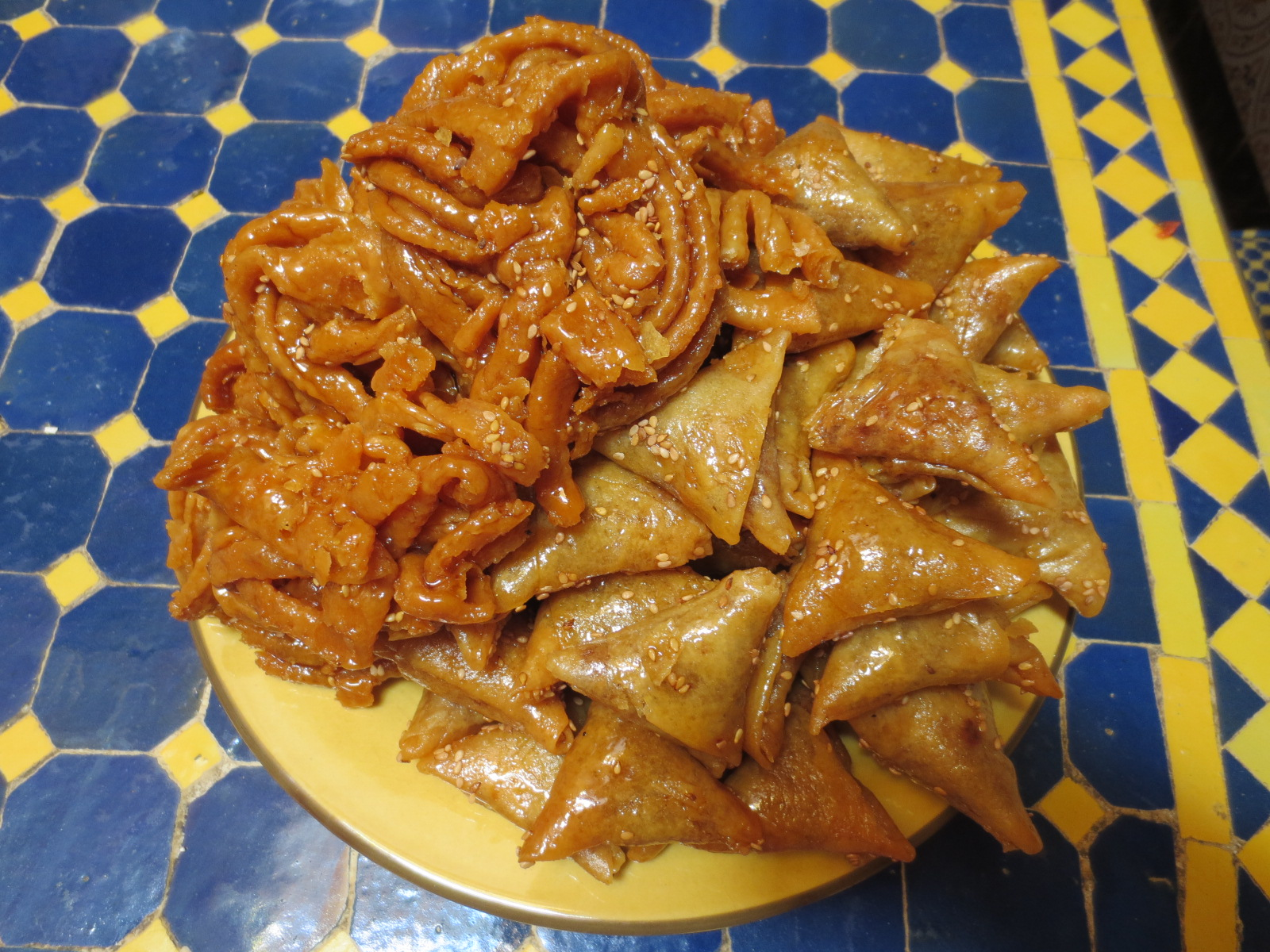
Two famous moroccan pastries: Chebakia (on the left) and the triangular Briouates. Chebakia are eaten dipped in the Harira Soup and Briouates both exist in a sweet version (the one we see on this picture) and salty (as an appetizer baked with brick puff pasty sheet with meat)

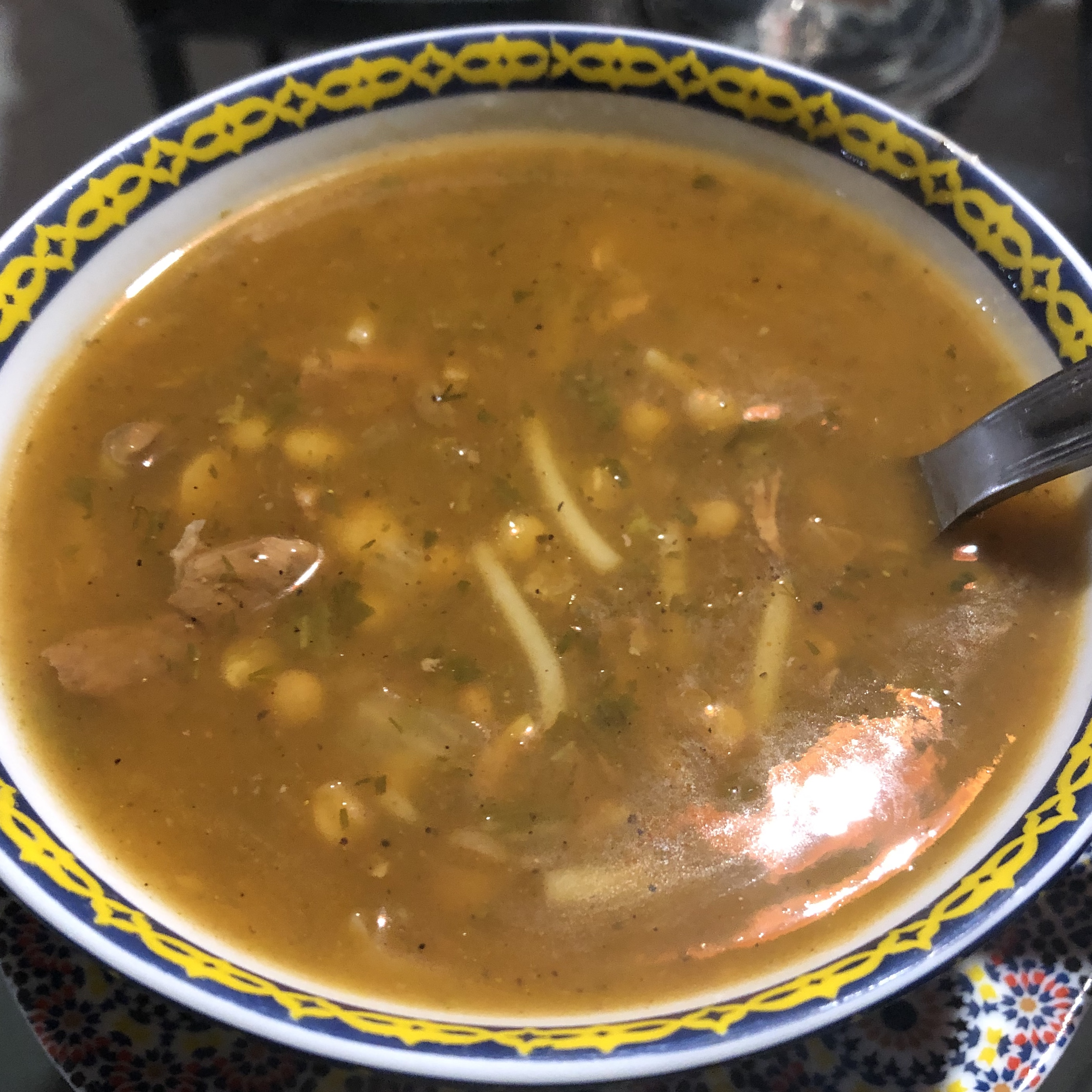
Harira, the Moroccan traditional tomato-based soup

Tajine kefta eggs

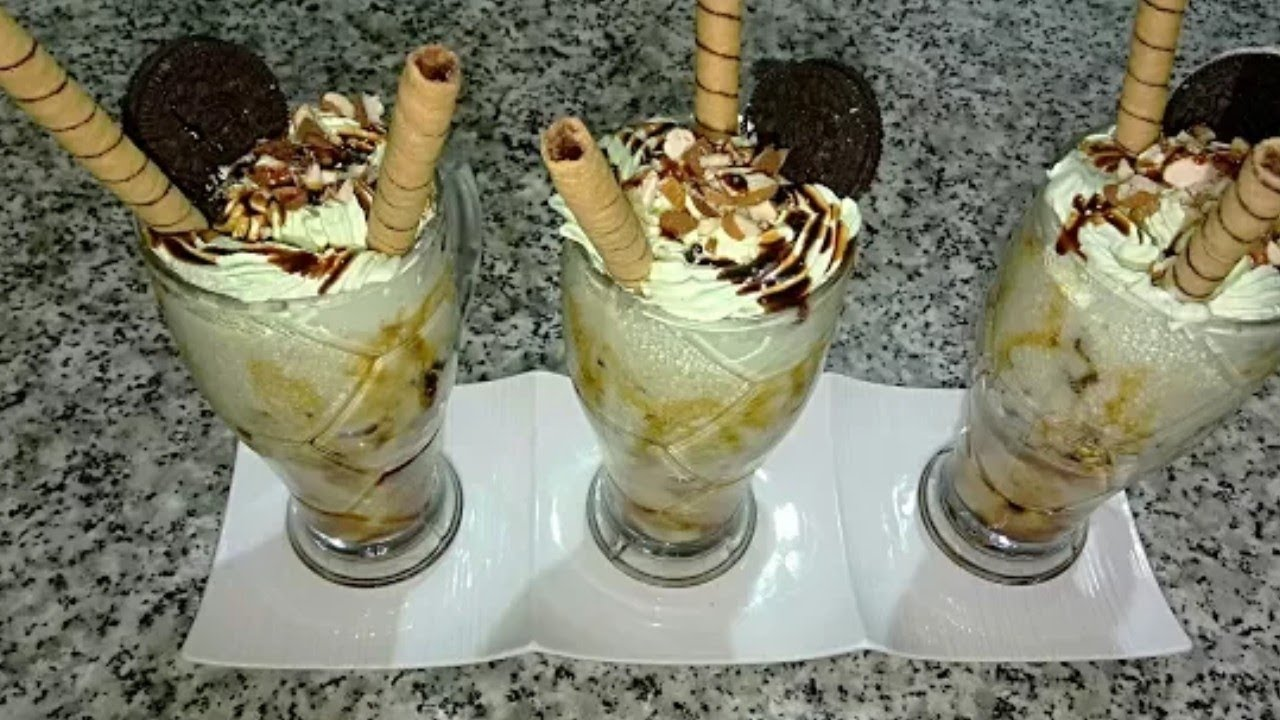
Zaazaa the traditional Moroccan avocado smoothie, it can be found in the street food stalls and restaurants in the city of Fes

Sweet Savory Pastilla filled with chicken

Loubia

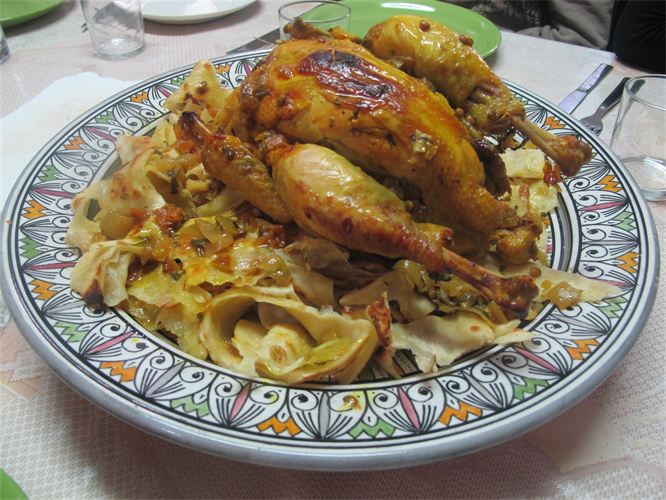
Rfissa

== Celebrations and holidays ==
=== Religious holidays ===
==== Islamic holidays ====
Morocco' official religion is Islam. The rhythm of life for Moroccans is dictated by religious celebrations throughout the year, such as Ramadan and Eid Al Adha. During these celebrations, most of them being public holidays, Moroccans focus on praying and spending time with their family. Moroccans also celebrate al-Mawlid al-Nabawi, the birthday of Muhammad, and the Islamic New Year.

Other religious celebrations include the Friday weekly prayer where most Moroccans go to the mosque for the Friday mid-day prayer.

==== Jewish holidays ====
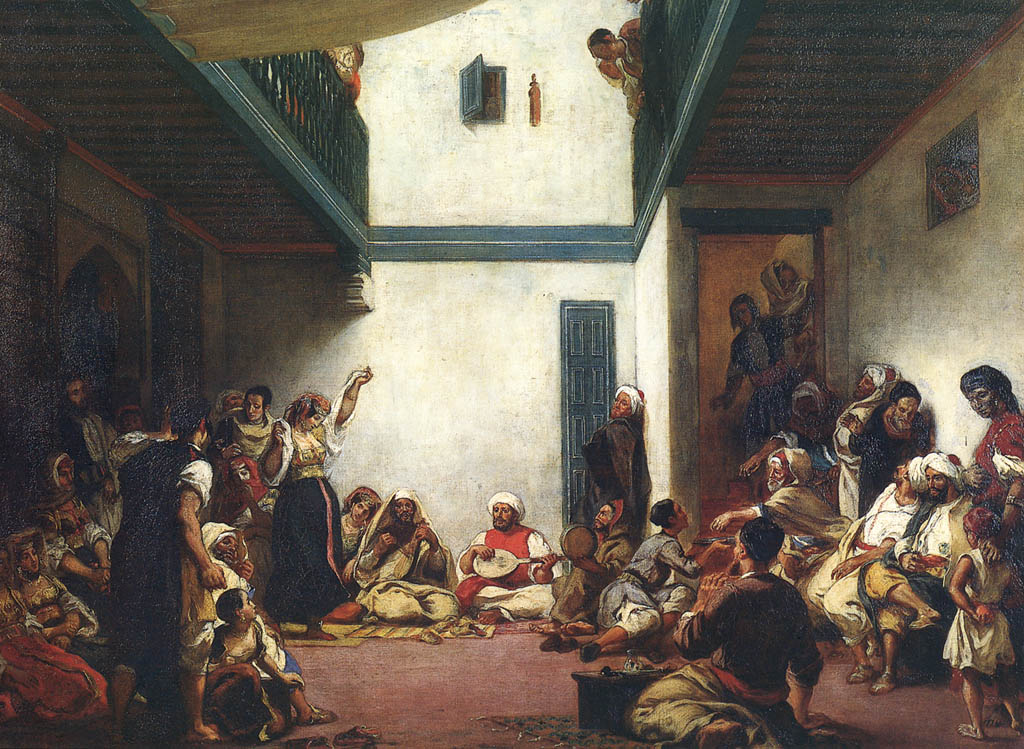
Jewish Wedding in Morocco by Eugène Delacroix, Louvre, Paris

Morocco has long had a significant Jewish population, distinguished by traditions particular to Moroccan Jews. For example, Mimouna is a characteristically Maghrebi holiday celebrated the day after Passover. Mahia is traditionally associated with Moroccan Purim celebrations.

=== Other religious observations ===
Saint veneration has been a practice in Morocco among Muslims and Jews. The former might visit a walī at a marabout, while the latter might partake in a hillula visitation for a tzadik.

=== Folk celebrations ===
Yennayer, the Amazigh new year, has been celebrated from January 12 to January 13, the beginning of the Julian calendar, since antiquity. Yennayer marks the New Year of the Amazigh people (the indigenous population of North Africa). This celebration is deeply connected to the cycle of the seasons and agricultural practices. It is a time of transition that celebrates renewal, fertility, the earth's abundance, and family unity. It is celebrated across the North African countries from Morocco to Libya

The Berber calendar is more than nine hundred years ahead of the Gregorian calendar. Specifically, the year 950 BCE roughly marks the ascension to the Egyptian throne of the Amazigh (Meshwesh) Pharaoh Sheshonq I, signaling the beginning of the 22nd Dynasty. This date serves as the starting point for the Yennayer Berber calendar, an agricultural calendar. In Morocco, Yennayer is celebrated on January 14, a date established by the Royal Institute of Amazigh Culture.

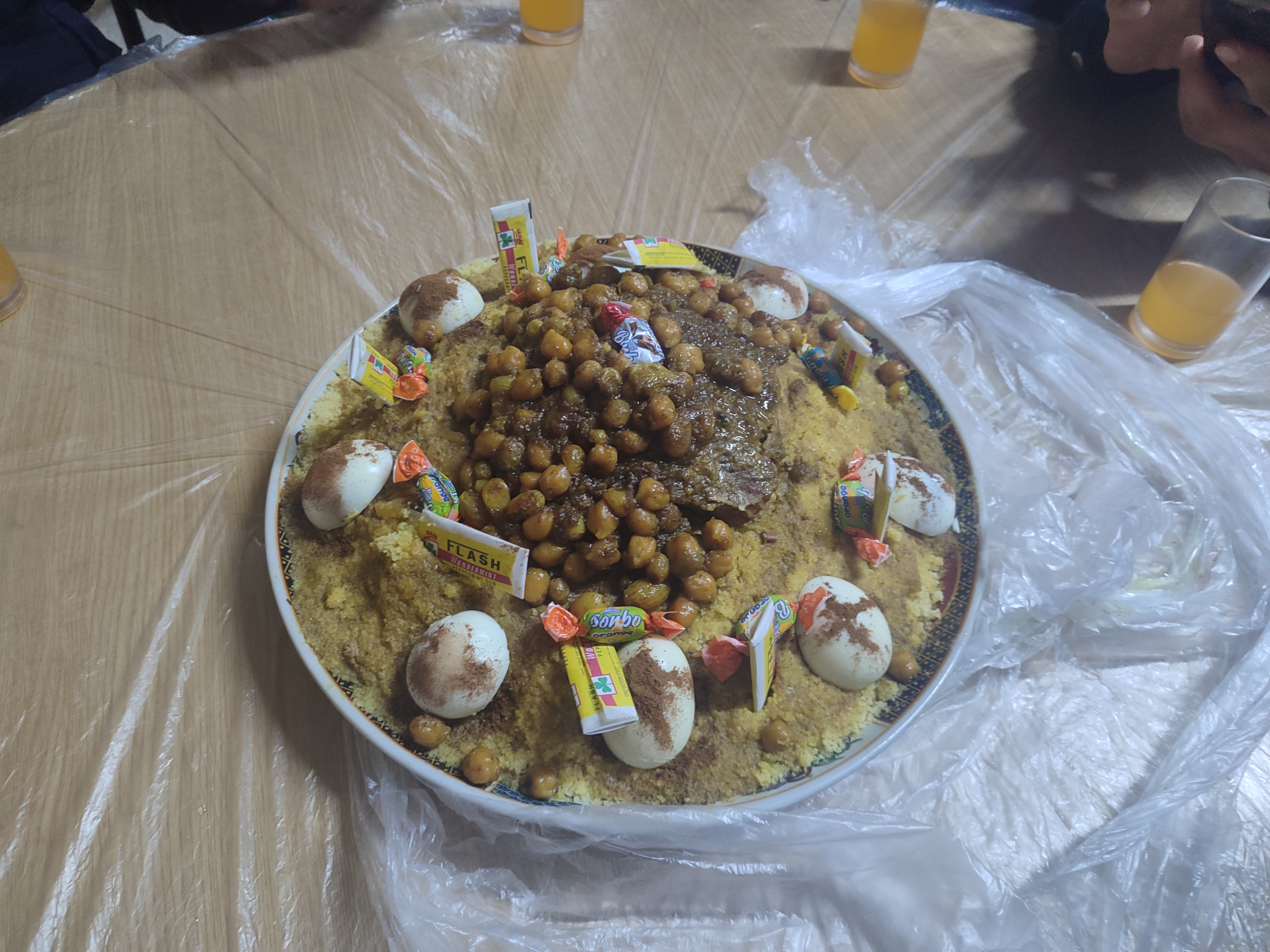
Couscous of Yennayer

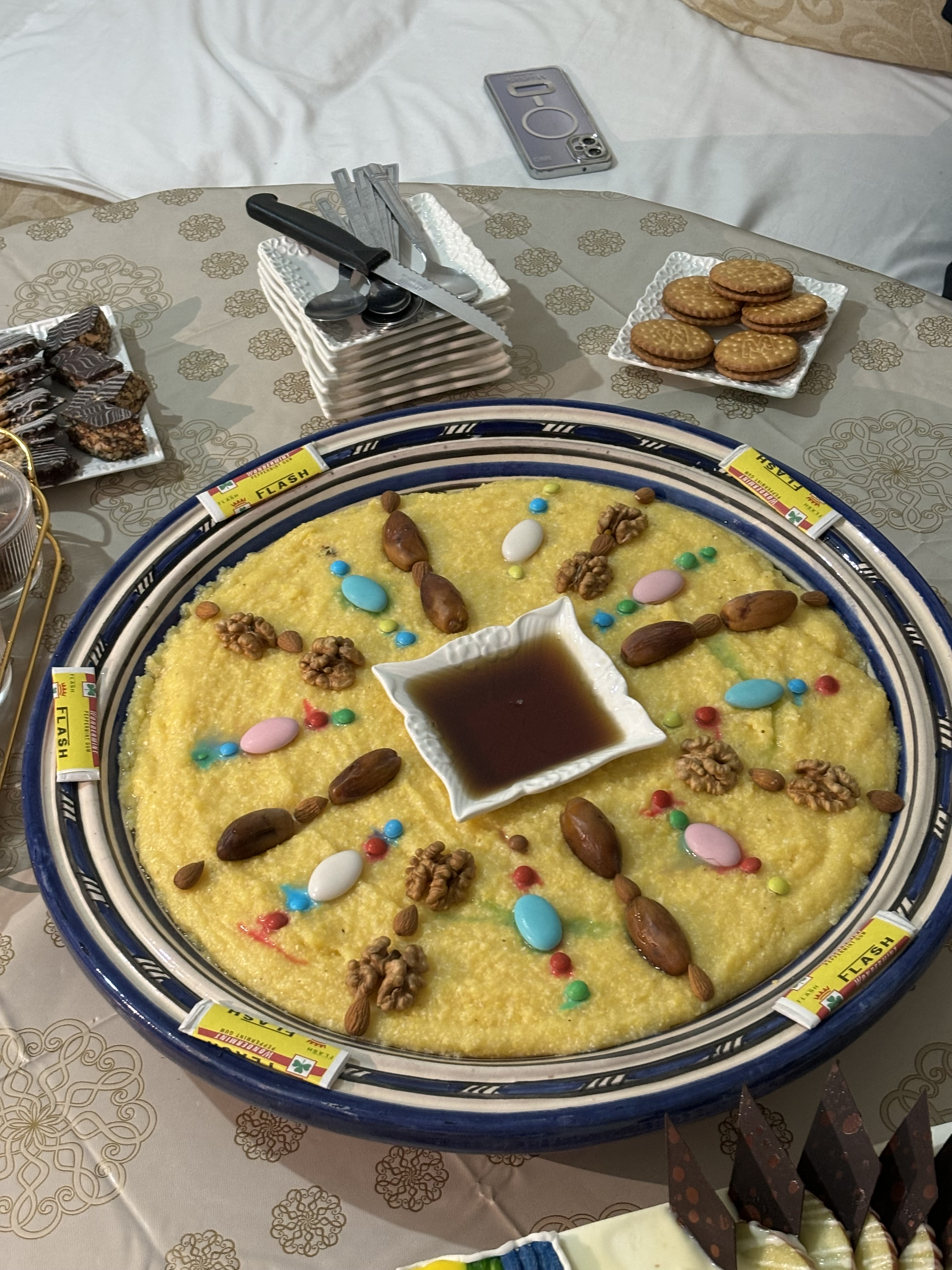
Tagoula

In Morocco, Yennayer is celebrated with songs and dances from Berber-speaking regions, such as the Ahidous. Dishes featuring local grains are served in a communal central dish; examples include Tagoula (a porridge made from barley flour), traditional couscous, or vegetable tagine. A lucky charm is hidden within the dish, and the person who finds it is considered lucky for the coming year. People wish each other a happy Yennayer by saying the Berber phrase: Assegas Ameggaz (literally "Happy New Year").

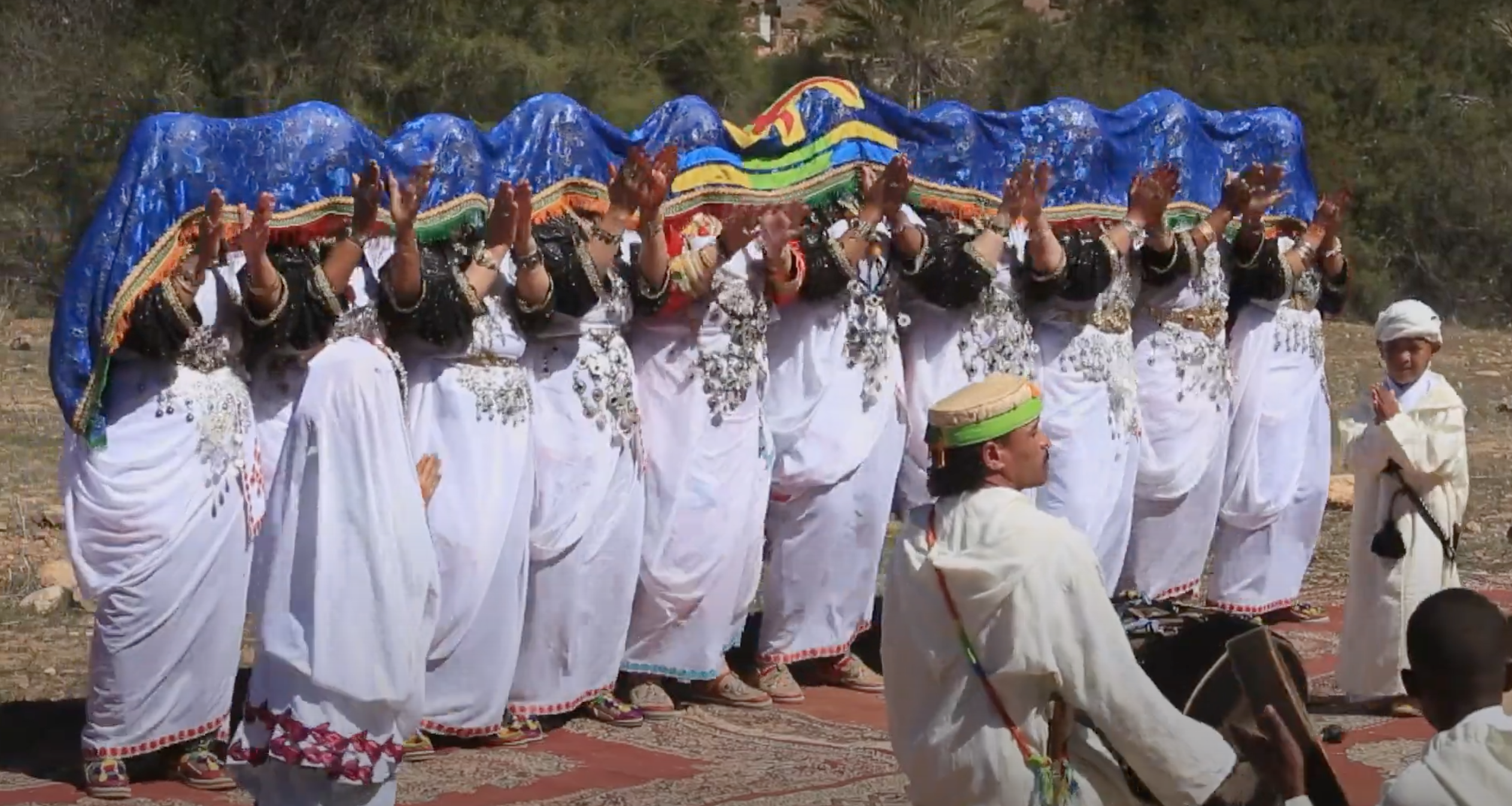
Ahwach a traditional dance performed during Yennayer and symbolizing unity. The women all dance under the same long veil

Amazigh/Berber flag

Other celebrations include Ashura, the tenth day of the Islamic year, and Bujlood, a folk carnival celebrated after Eid al-Adha.

Boujloud or Bilmawen/Boudmawen (literally "skin-stealer" in Berber) is another pagan Moroccan celebration likely of pre-Islamic origin (dating back to the kingdoms of Mauretania and Gaetulia). The rite evolved to fit into the Islamic calendar and is celebrated alongside Eid. It takes place in the country's southwest, particularly in Agadir, Imintanoute, and Inezgane within the Souss-Massa region. Men clad in sheepskins take to the streets—transforming them into open-air stages—to the rhythm of Berber percussion; they chase children in a festive atmosphere while also performing dances such as Ahwach. A similar rite can be observed in El Hierro in the Canary Islands (also a Berber land). It is a celebration marked by creativity and community spirit.

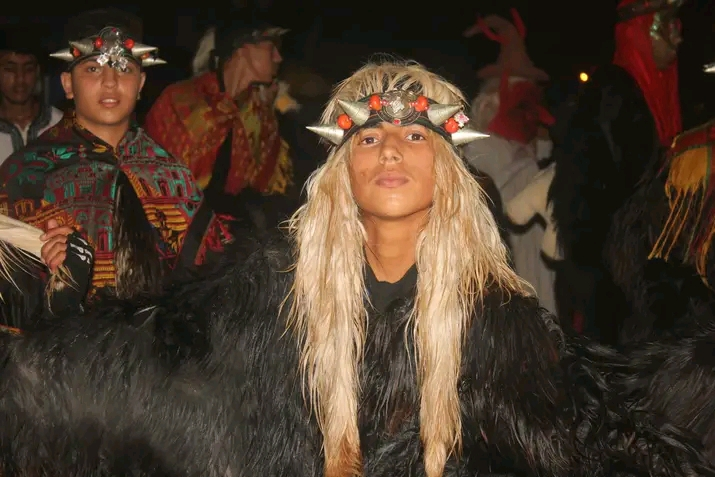

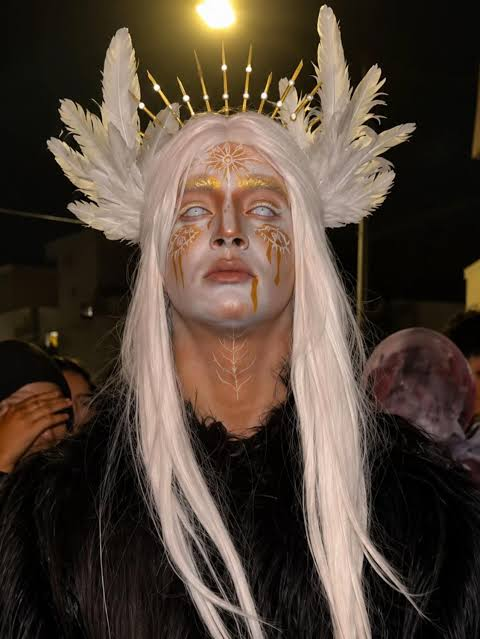
Clothing for the Bilmawen festival in Agadir. Goat skin is the central element, there are also references to Amazigh traditions such as facial tattoos.

==== Festivals ====
Taburida, or mawsam or fantasia, is a traditional exhibition of horsemanship in the Maghreb performed during cultural festivals and for Maghrebi wedding celebrations. There are also several annual festivals that take place in Morocco, such as the Betrothal Festival in Imilshil, the rose festival in Qalaat Megouna, or the saffron festival in Taliween.

== Carpets, dress and jewellery ==
=== Carpet weaving ===
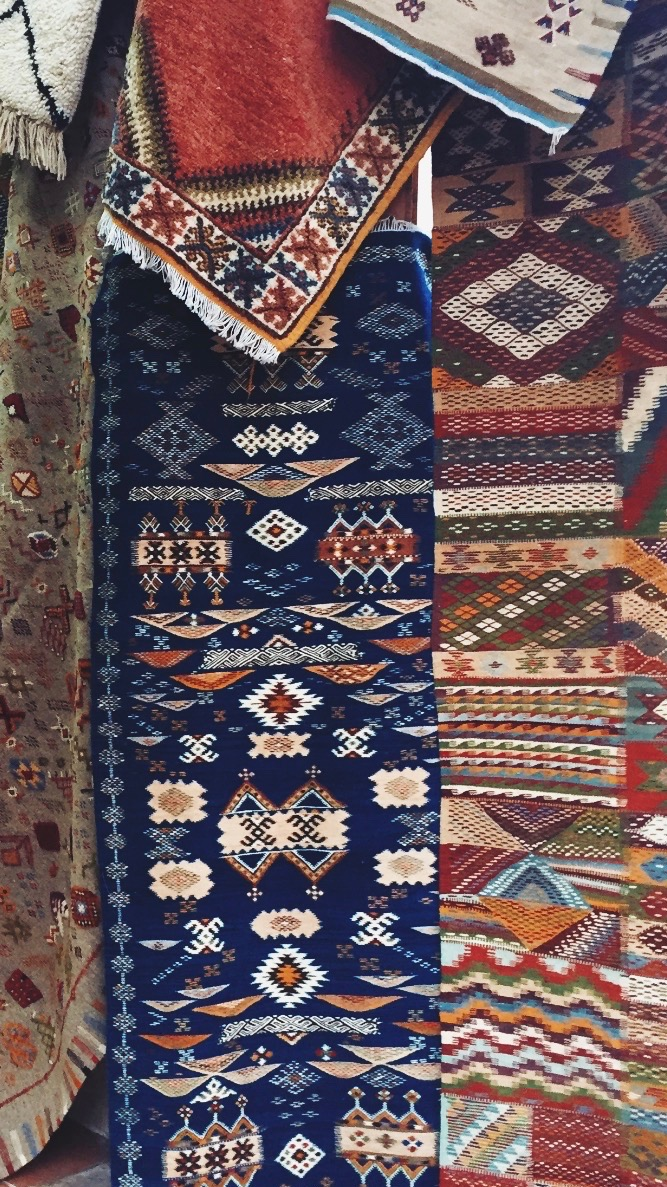
Moroccan carpets for sale at a shop on the Street of the Consulates in Rabat

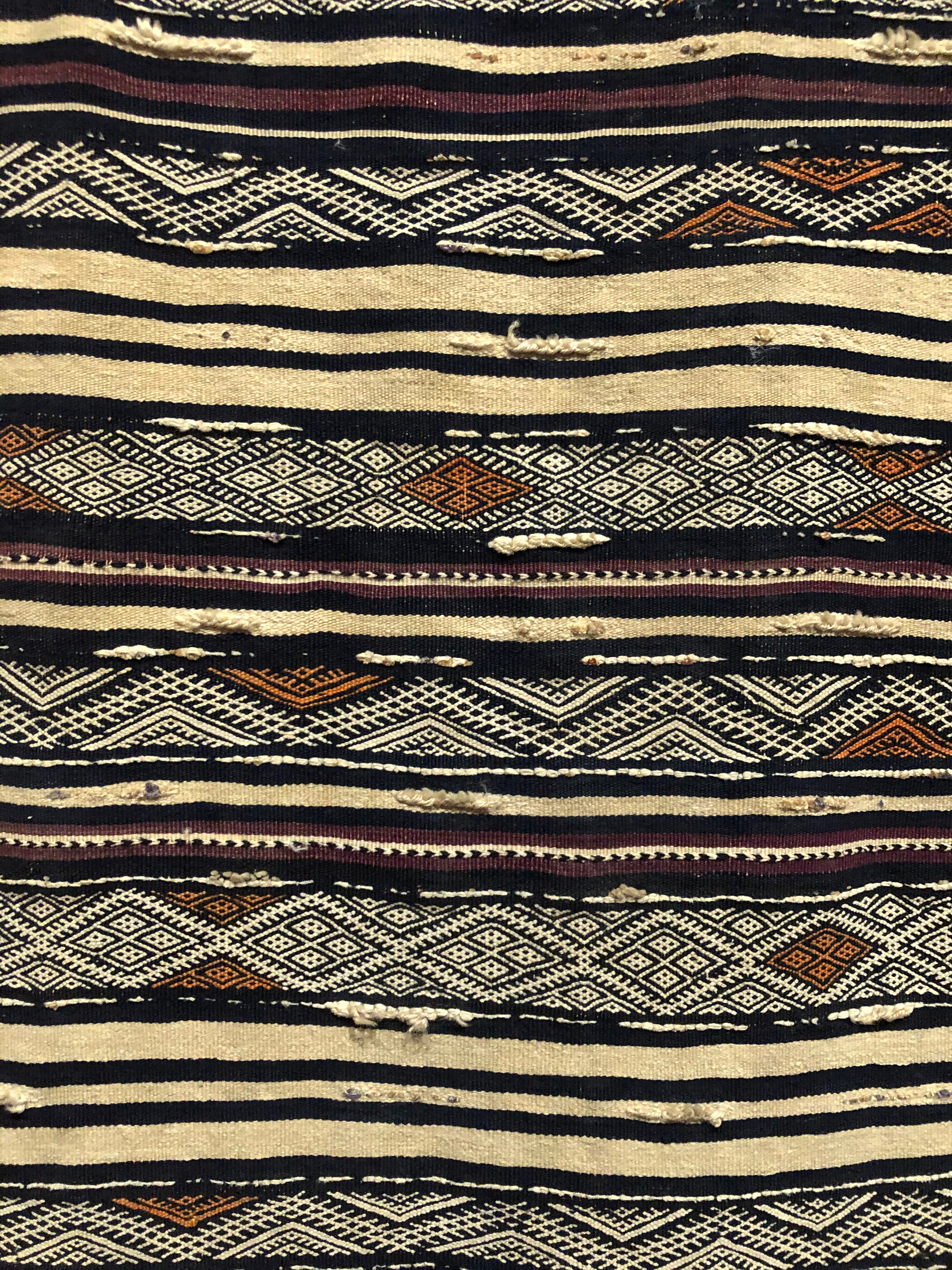
A woman's hendira, woven out of wool in the early 20th century

Carpet weaving is a traditional craft in Morocco. Styles vary dramatically from region to region and from tribe to tribe. Among the more popular varieties there are:

- Azilal, High Atlas
- Bujad, near Khenifra
- Beni Warain, Middle Atlas
- Beni M'guild, Middle Atlas
- Bousherwiit
- Kilim
- Marmusha
- Zanafi
- Zemmour

Some Atlas tribes, such as the Beni Ouarain, also weave hendiras, which are ornate woven cloaks for use in the winter. When it is snowing, they can be overturned and the loose loops of wool help snow fall off to keep the cloak dry.

== Traditional clothing in Morocco ==
=== Jellaba, Gandoura, Jabador and Burnous ===
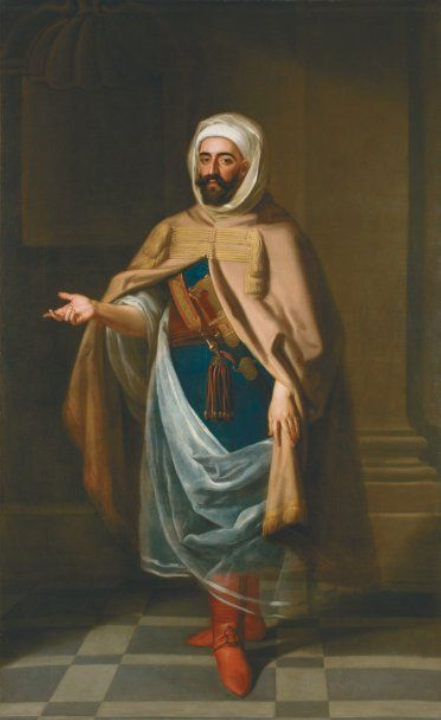
Portrait of his excellency Mohamed Ben Ali abgali with Al sulham, ambassador of the King of Morocco to the court of Saint James. August 1725. He wears a traditional Moroccan Burnous.

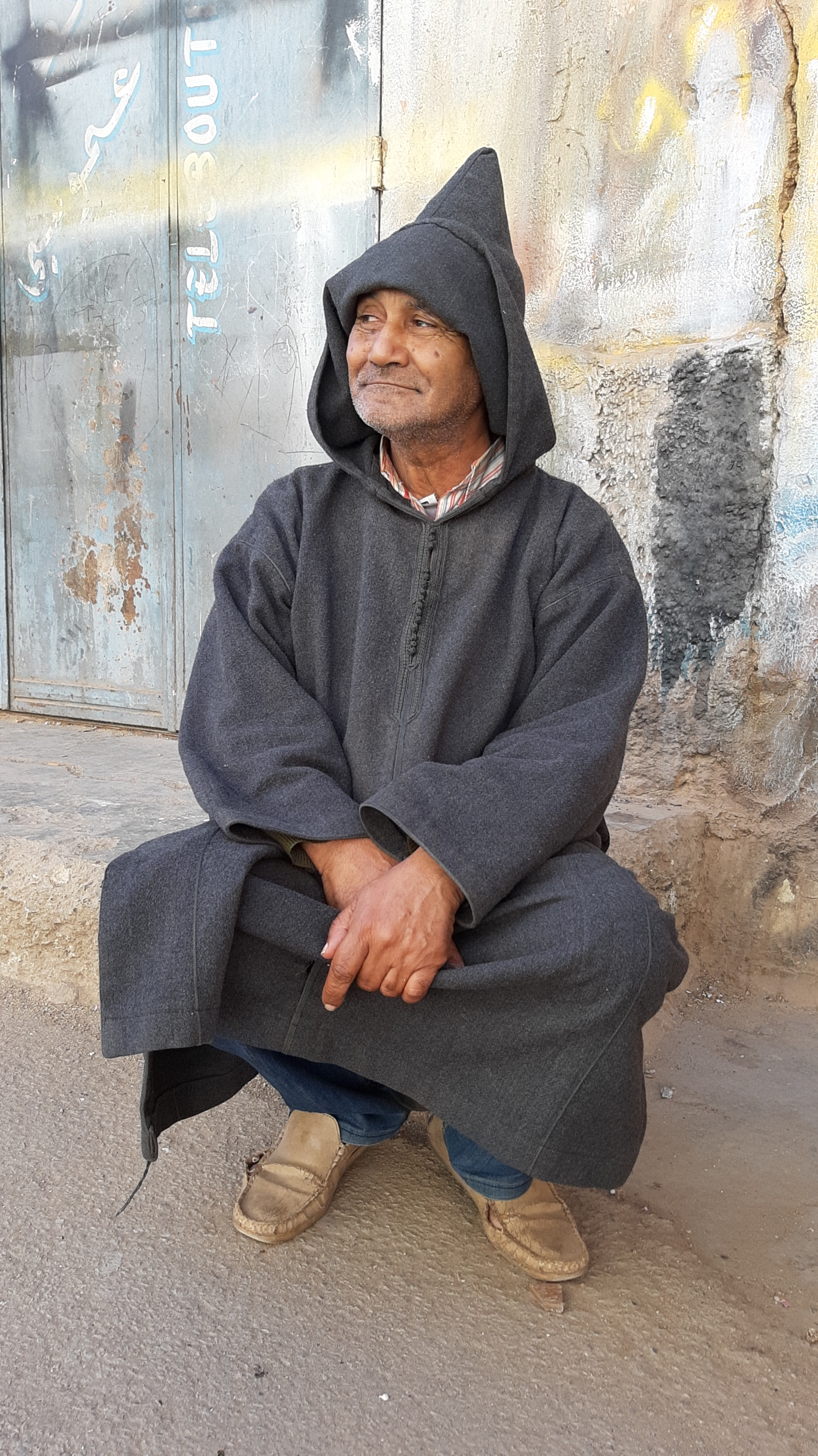
Jellaba Kheidoussa

The traditional dress for men and women is called Jellaba (جلابة); a long, loose, hooded garment with full sleeves. The djellaba has a hood that comes to a point called a qob. The qob protects the wearer from the sun or in colder climates, like the mountains, the qob keeps in body heat and protects the face from falling snow. For special occasions, men also wear a red cap called a bernousse, more commonly referred to as a Fez. Women wear Jellaba (قفطان) decorated with ornaments. Nearly all men, and most women, wear balgha (بلغة) —- soft leather slippers with no heel, often dyed yellow. Women also wear high-heeled sandals, often with silver or gold tinsel.

The distinction between a Jellaba and a Gandoura is the hood on the Jellaba, which a Gandoura lacks. Most women's Jellabas are brightly colored and have ornate patterns, stitching, or beading, while men's Jellabas are usually plainer and colored neutrally.

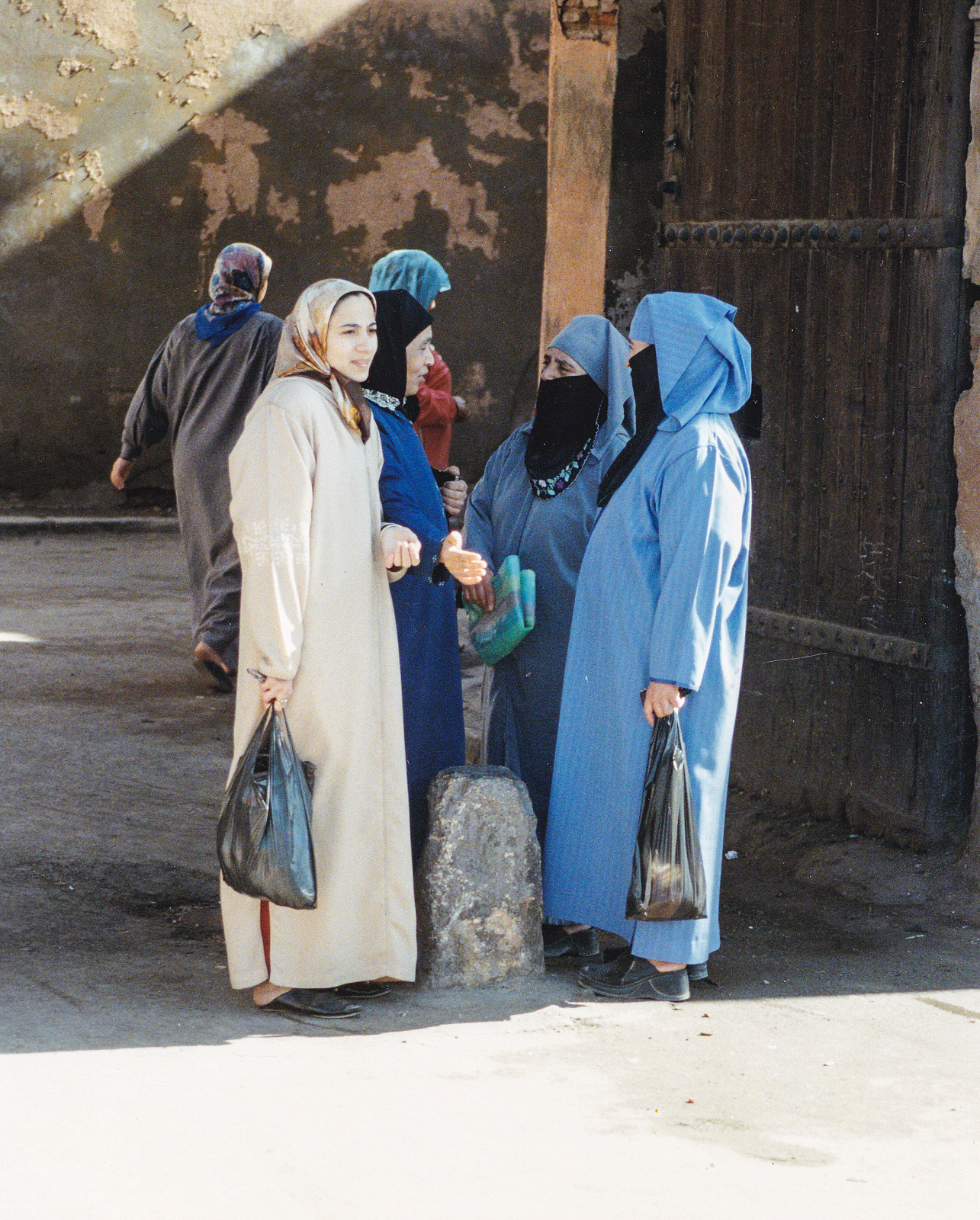
Group of Moroccan women; some of them wear a Gandoura and others Jellabas. The Gandoura doesn't have a hood

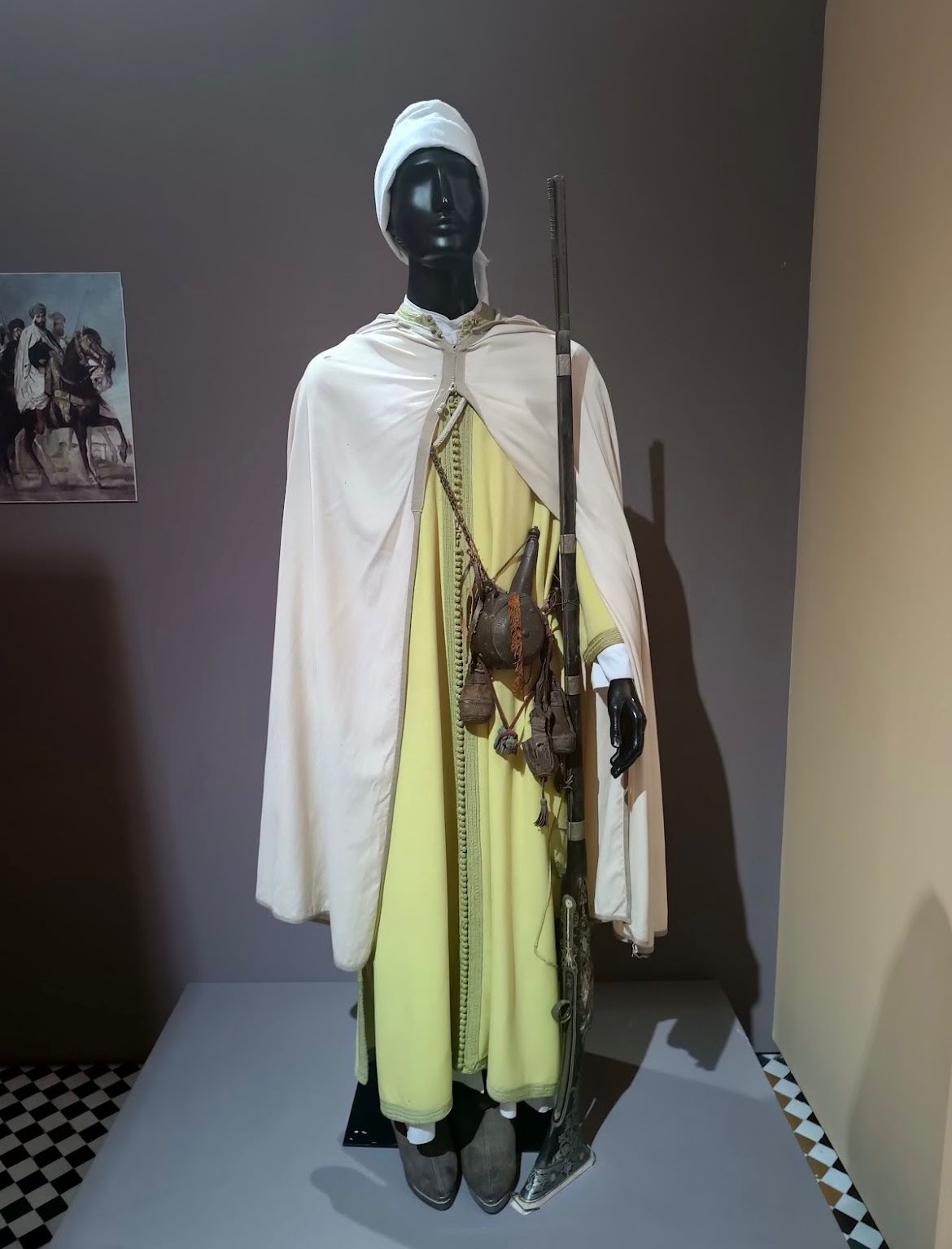
Burnous

The Burnous whose etymology may be linked to the Latin Burrus is one of North Africa's oldest garments; it is a large, hooded cape draped over the shoulders. A Berber garment predating the arrival of the Roman Empire in the Maghreb, it was presented to the rulers of the kingdoms of Mauretania (ancient Morocco) and Numidia (ancient Algeria), according to the ancient Byzantine historian Procopius. The Moroccan Jellaba is undoubtedly its modern evolution. The burnous is worn in urban settings by wealthy and prominent sultans just as it is by men in Berber-speaking regions; however, while the garment is typically made of sheep's wool in the latter context, it is crafted from silk when worn by the kings of Morocco.

Jabador is a two or three piece traditional costume for Men. It is composed The two-piece Jabador is originally composed of a vest made of red velvet (Ba'dia), embroidered with gold thread (Sqalli), fastened with gold buttons (Aakad) and paired with the Tarboush the traditional hat from Fez. The most important element of the outfit is the Saroual (baggy, loose-fitting pants in North African and Arab/Middle Eastern cultures ). A modern three-piece version includes a long-sleeved jacket.

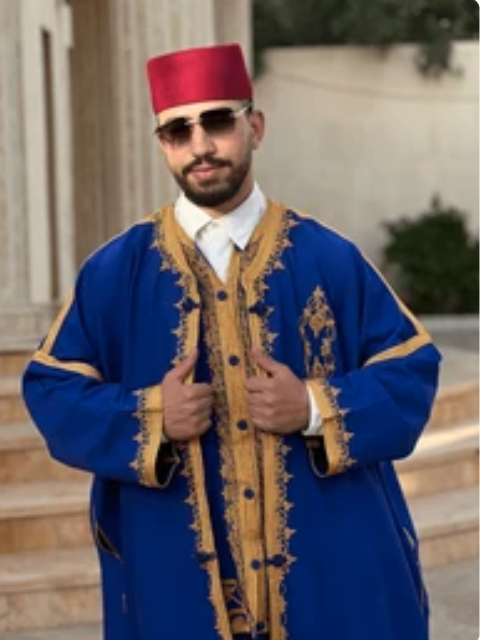
Moroccan man wearing a Jabador

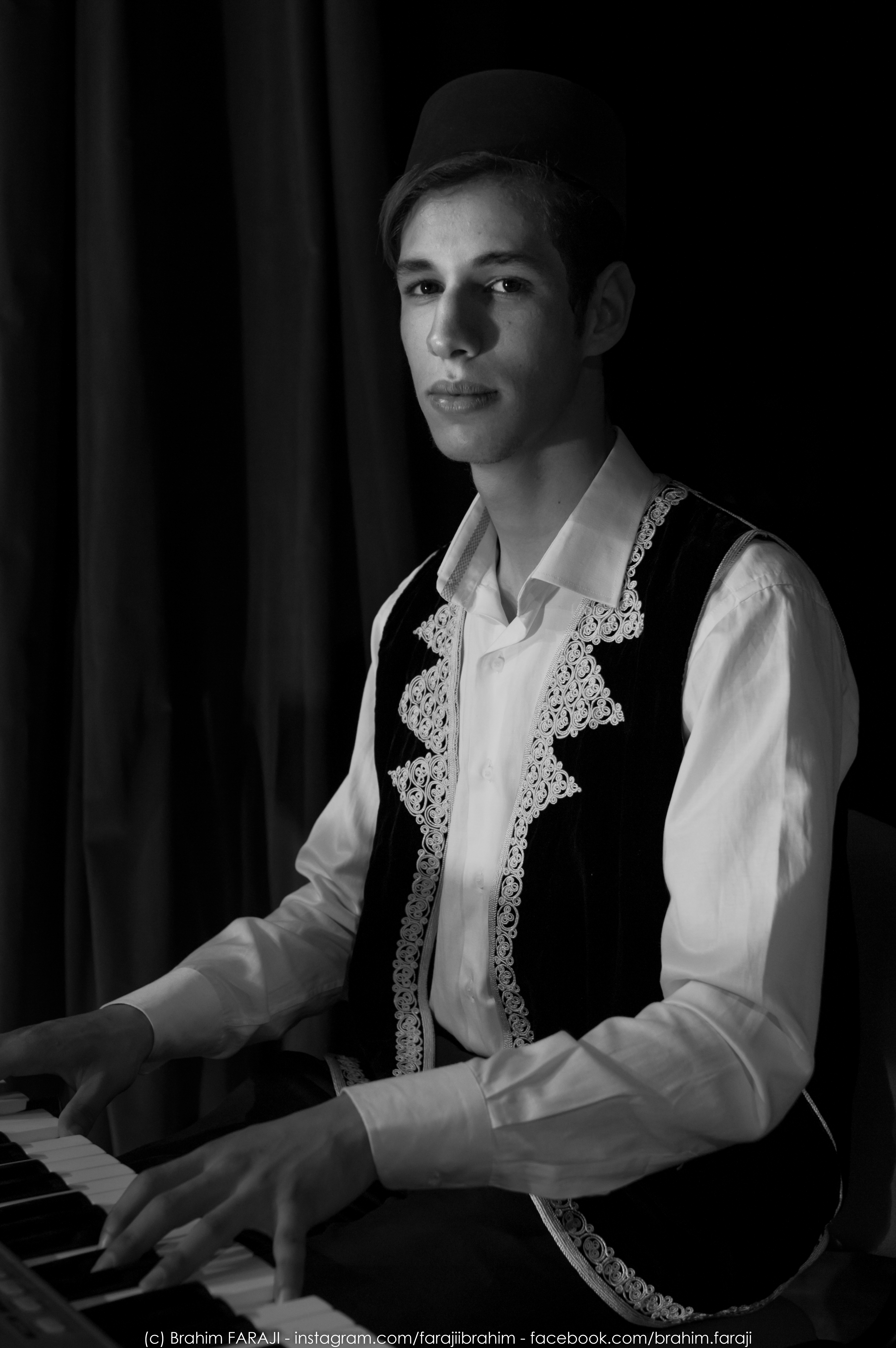
Man in Oujda wearing the traditional two-pieced Jabador

Jabadour embroidered with golden threads

=== Moroccan Caftan and its variations ===
The caftan is the most prestigious garment in Moroccan culture. It was likely introduced to Morocco in the 16th century, during the Saadian dynasty, by the Ottoman Empire. Initially reserved for sultans and prominent members of the court, the garment signified the wearer's high social status and wealth. Over time, the caftan became deeply rooted in the clothing traditions of Moroccan women, serving as a symbol of prestige and luxury. Today, it is worn on numerous occasions, such as weddings, christenings, and celebrations of all kinds.

In Morocco, Caftan comes in various regional styles and fabrics. However, it features recurring characteristic elements such as: as central opening (called Sfifa), Aakad (golden buttons), a hzam (Fabric or massive gold belt), and a rich hand-crafted embellishments including: embroidery, beads, sequins and gold threads. These decorations may vary according to the specific model and regional style, often incorporating, floral, animal (peacocks) or geometric motifs. Master artisans, known as maalems, pass down the knowledge of crafting this garment from generation to generation, whether through formal training or within the family. They are experts in weaving and fabric production (using materials like velvet, silk, and brocade) as well as in the creation of buttons, embroidery, and decorative braids. These artisanal practices have gained recognition, and the Moroccan caftan has been inscribed on the list of World Heritage.

With the rise of the haute couture sector in the 20th century, the Moroccan caftan quickly found its place in that world; Yves Saint Laurent notably showcased it in his fashion shows as early as the 1970s.

There are numerous regional variations of the Moroccan caftan. The Takchita (also known as the Mansouria, likely created during the reign of the Saadian Sultan Ahmed Al-Mansour) differs in that it consists of two pieces: the *tahtya* is the under-caftan—the base layer beneath a second, visible caftan—which is slit at the bottom to reveal the layer underneath.

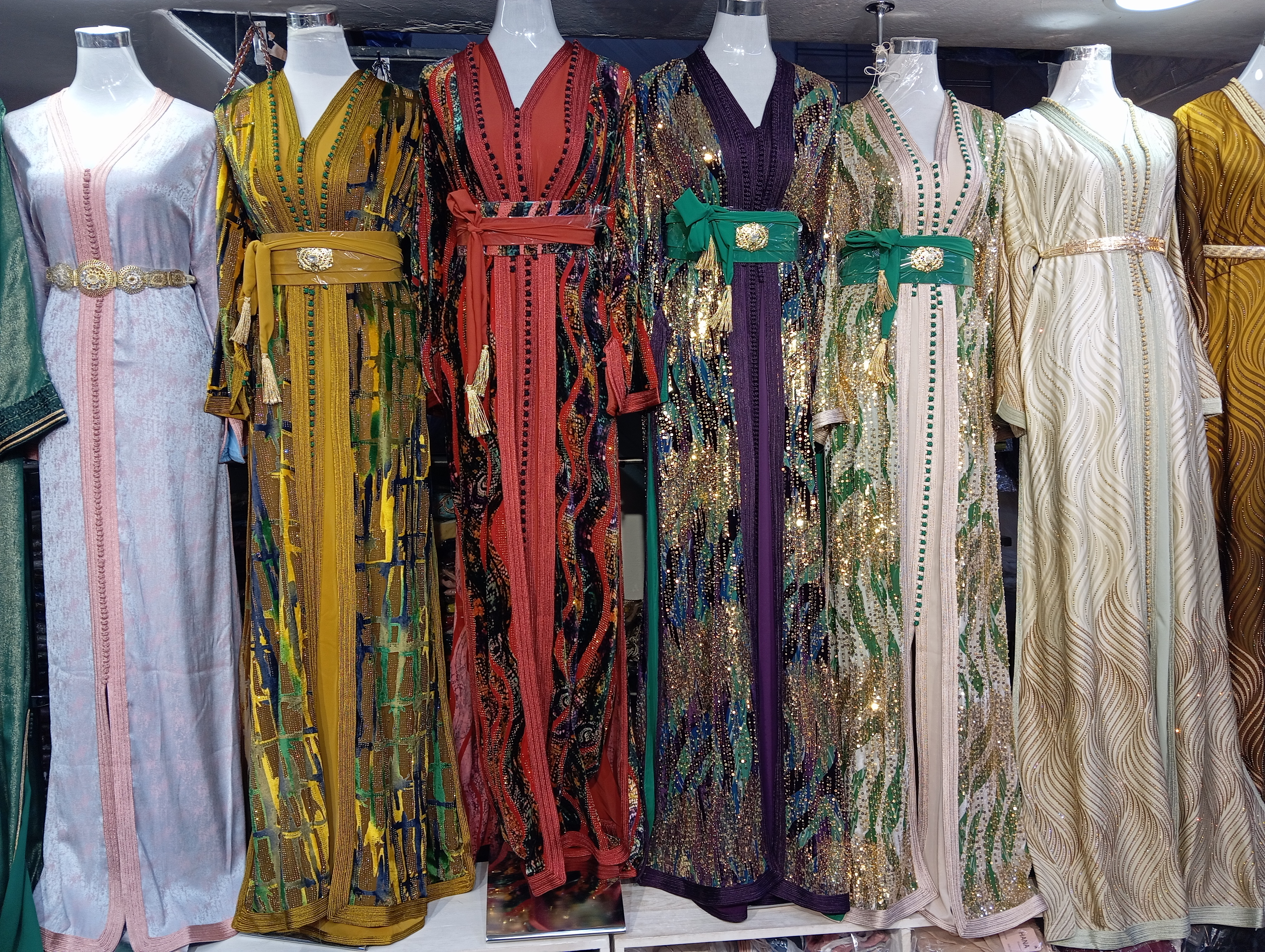
Takchitas in a traditional dress shop

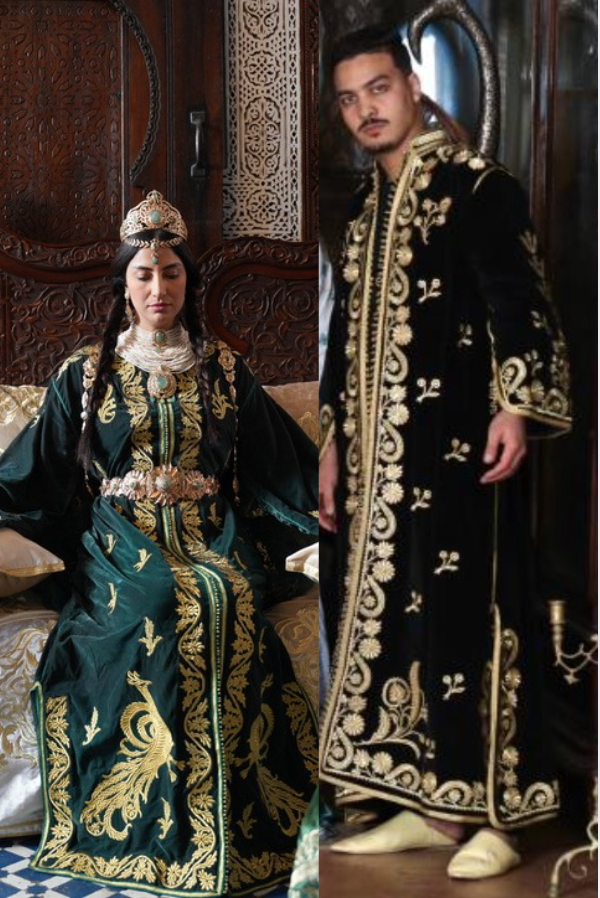
Caftan Ntâa of Fes

The Fes Ntâa Caftan is longer and wider; it is crafted entirely from velvet (emerald green or garnet red) and features botanical and peacock motifs embroidered with gold thread (Squilla) along the hem. Jews expelled from the Iberian Peninsula in the 15th century who sought refuge in Morocco became master artisans in gold-thread embroidery. This same gold-thread embroidery appears in many elements of Moroccan craftsmanship, including leather armchairs, babouches (traditional slippers), cushions, and wall hangings.

The Khrib Caftan stands out from other brocades due to its citrus-colored fabrics (yellow or orange), floral patterns (often red roses), and gold-thread detailing; it is a luxurious garment.

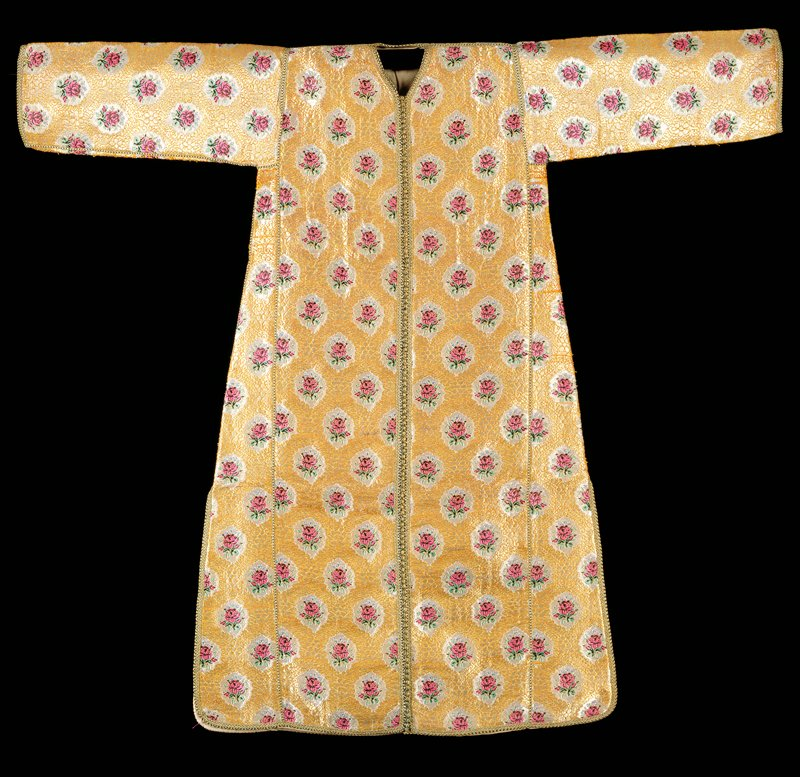
Caftan Khrib, 20th century

Finally, the Keswa Kbira is the traditional wedding dress worn by women of the Jewish community in northern Morocco (the Rif region) and forms part of the dowry. It is made of red velvet, features a decorative chest panel, and has lace sleeves. A silk sash cinches the waist. The lower section consists of a long, wide skirt with a gold-thread embroidered hem, featuring twenty-two gold-thread circles that form the letters of the Hebrew alphabet. This dress was very well documented by the French ethnographer and painter Jean Besancenot. He traveled to meet the Berber-speaking populations of Morocco and compiled sketches of their attire in 1942 in his book Costumes du Maroc.

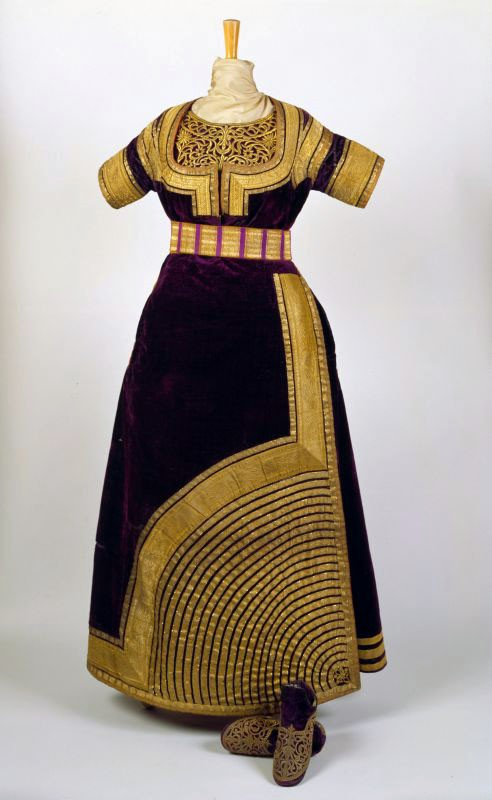
Keswa lKbira

==== Moroccan Chedda ====
The Moroccan Chedda is the traditional bridal costume of northern Morocco Chedda Chamaliya (Second photo from the top and first in the bottom row) and the northeast Chedda Oujdia (Second photo in the Middle row).

It consists of a "Caftan" which is the outfit's centerpiece, along with an array of jewelry and ornaments that vary by region. In the Rif region, the Chedda Chamaliya comprises a Caftan paired with a fitted Mdamma belt, a large lace or striped silk veil known as a "Sebniya de Sqalli" (adorned with a gold floral-patterned crown), and, finally, a large pendant necklace .

In the city of Oujda (Chedda Oujdia), the dress is recognizable by the gold cone worn by the bride as well as the long gold necklaces, big pearl earrings and chains adorning the Caftan. The Oujda Caftan itself is made of velvet, often in a garnet shade. Two other traditional dresses from the Eastern part of Morocco can be used as the centerpiece of the wedding dress in Oujdia, the Oujdi Blousa (Blousa Oujdia) or the Moroccan Haïk.

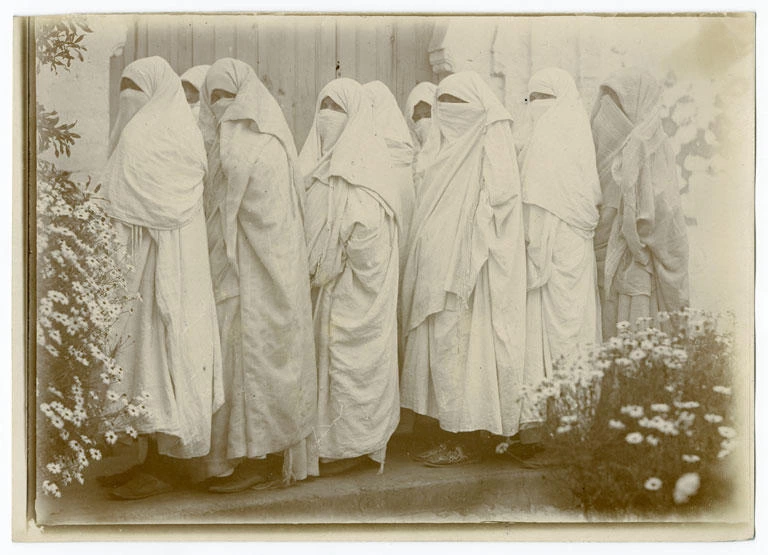
Group of Moroccan women wearing the Haïk

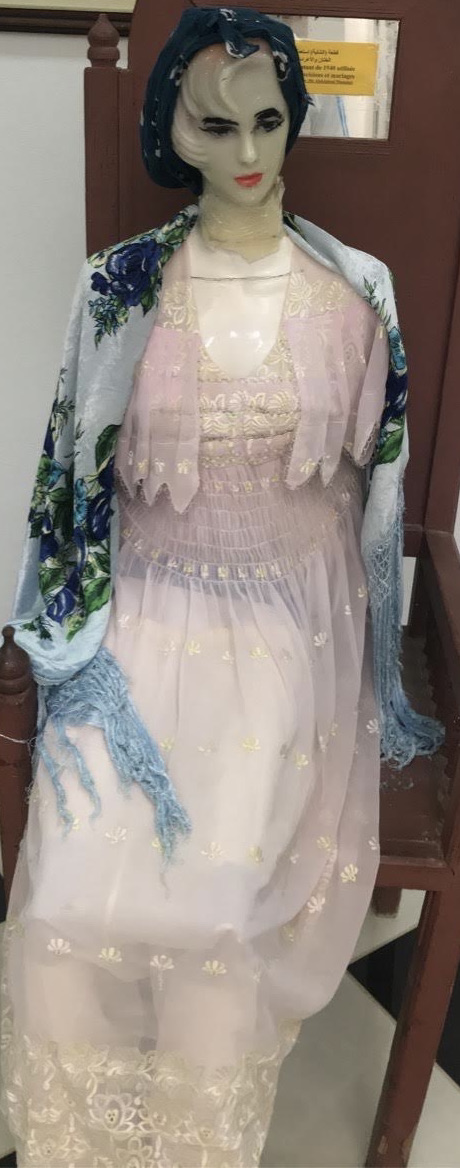
Blousa Oujdia (city of Taza)

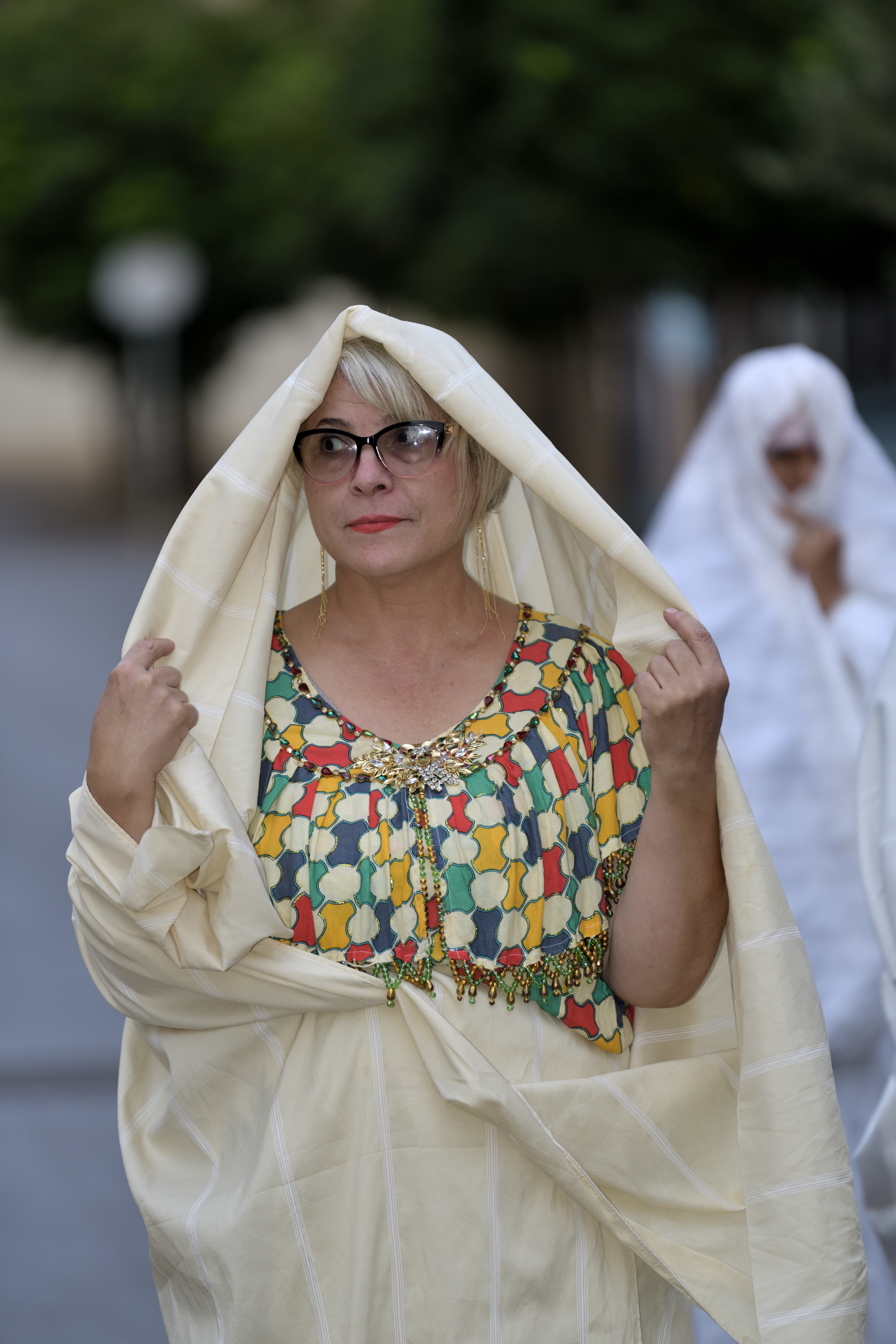
Latifa Mentbeh, Moroccan Blousa creator and artisan wearing an Oujda Haïk with a Blousa Oujdia.

Chedda of Tetouan (Chedda Tetouania)

Chedda of Oujda (Chedda Oujdia)

Chedda of Chefchaouen (Chedda Chefchaouenia)

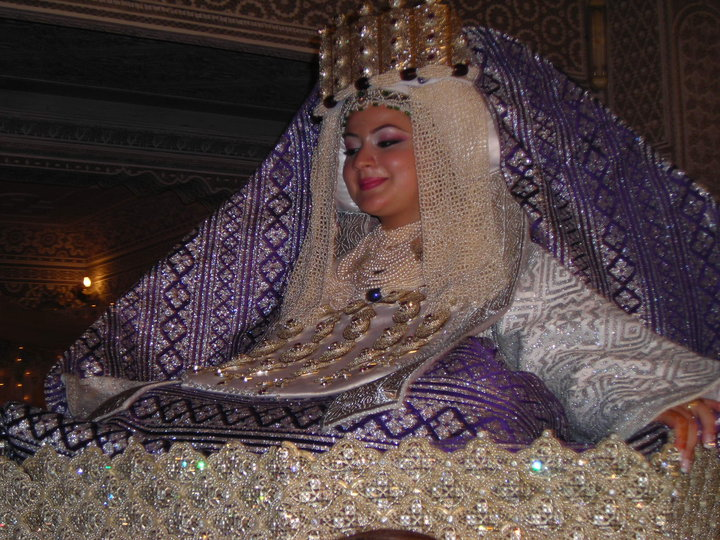
Chedda of Fes (Chedda Fassia)

Chedda of Rabat (Chedda Rbatia)

Finally, the Chedda Fassia or Lebsa Fassia is the traditional wedding attire of the city of Fez. It is the most instantly recognizable style due to its imposing appearance, which makes movement difficult for the bride; consequently, she sits on a traditional throne known as an "Amariya". The "Kaftan Khrib" (a citrus-colored caftan adorned with rose motifs) serves as the centerpiece, featuring a large, jewel-encrusted breastplate. The ensemble also includes the necklace characteristic of other Chedda styles, as well as a crown and a silk veil both of which are far more elaborate in the Chedda Fassia's version. For makeup, the bride from Fez wears white khol applied as dots beneath her eyes.

===== Clothing in the Moroccan Sahara =====
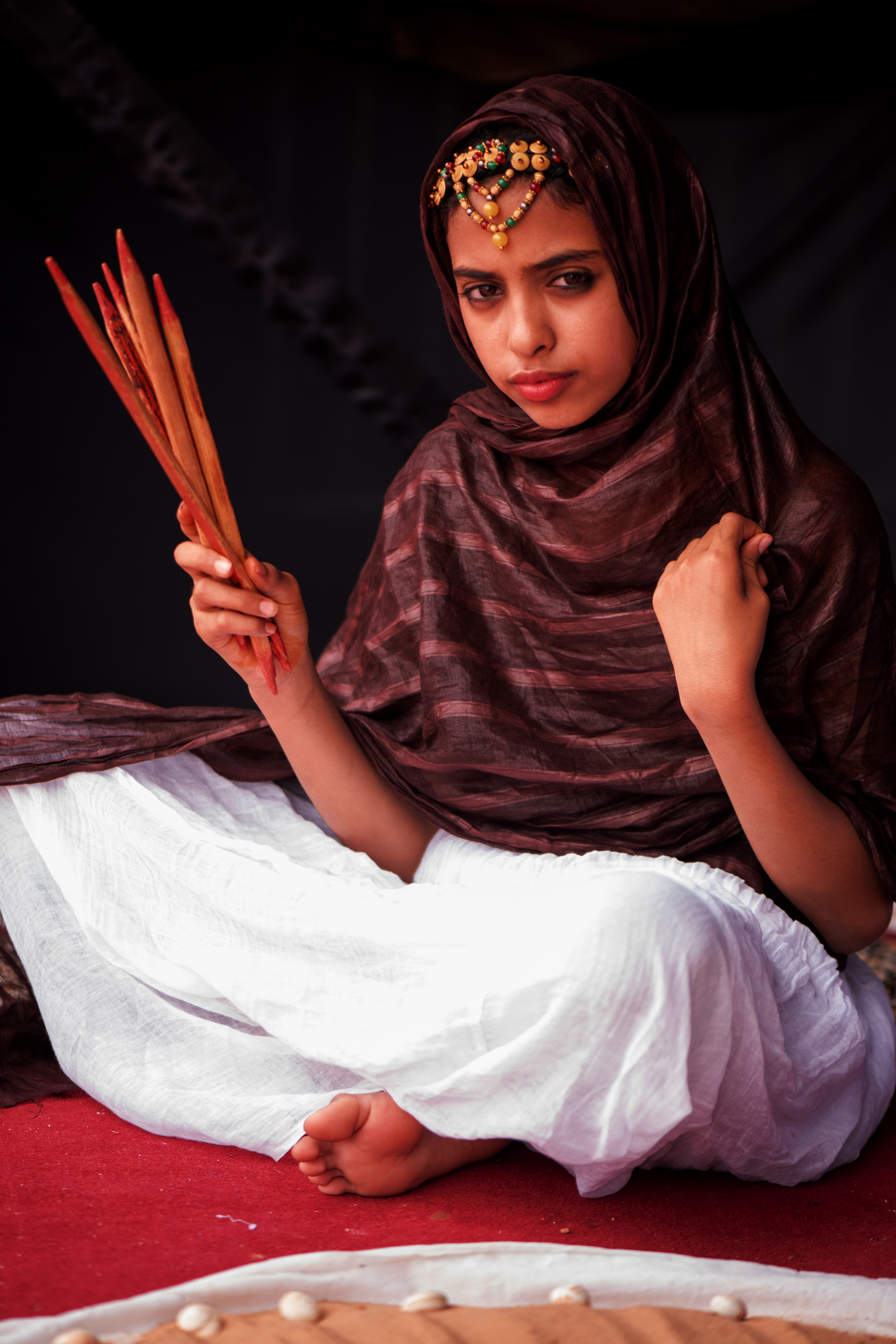
Teenager wearing a Melhfa in the city of Tan-Tan

Derâa Sahraouia

Traditional clothing in the Moroccan Sahara serves a practical purpose, allowing Sahrawi men and women to protect themselves from the sun's rays. Loose-fitting garments that cover the skin and head have long been favored, though they have evolved and become more stylized, much like other Moroccan attire. The Melhfa is the primary garment worn by Sahrawi women in Morocco; it consists of a draped cloth (similar to the *Haïk*) that wraps around the body and covers the hair. It is worn in urban areas (such as Laayoune and Dakhla) as well as by nomads. This garment is not exclusive to the Moroccan Sahara; it represents a shared cross-border heritage with other desert regions in North and Northwest Africa (including northern Mali/Azawad, Mauritania, and Sudan). As for Sahrawi men, they wear an outfit called the Derâa. It is a loose-fitting *gandoura* (square-shaped) in blue—the color of desert men—that covers the entire body. It is worn in Morocco and Mauritania.

===== Gallery of some Moroccan traditional clothes =====
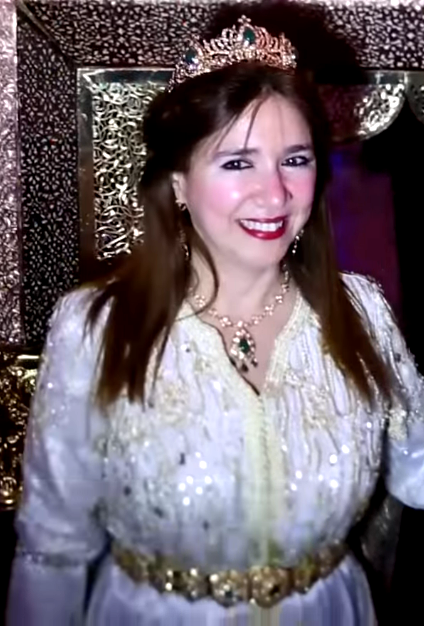
Moroccan Caftan in its classic form

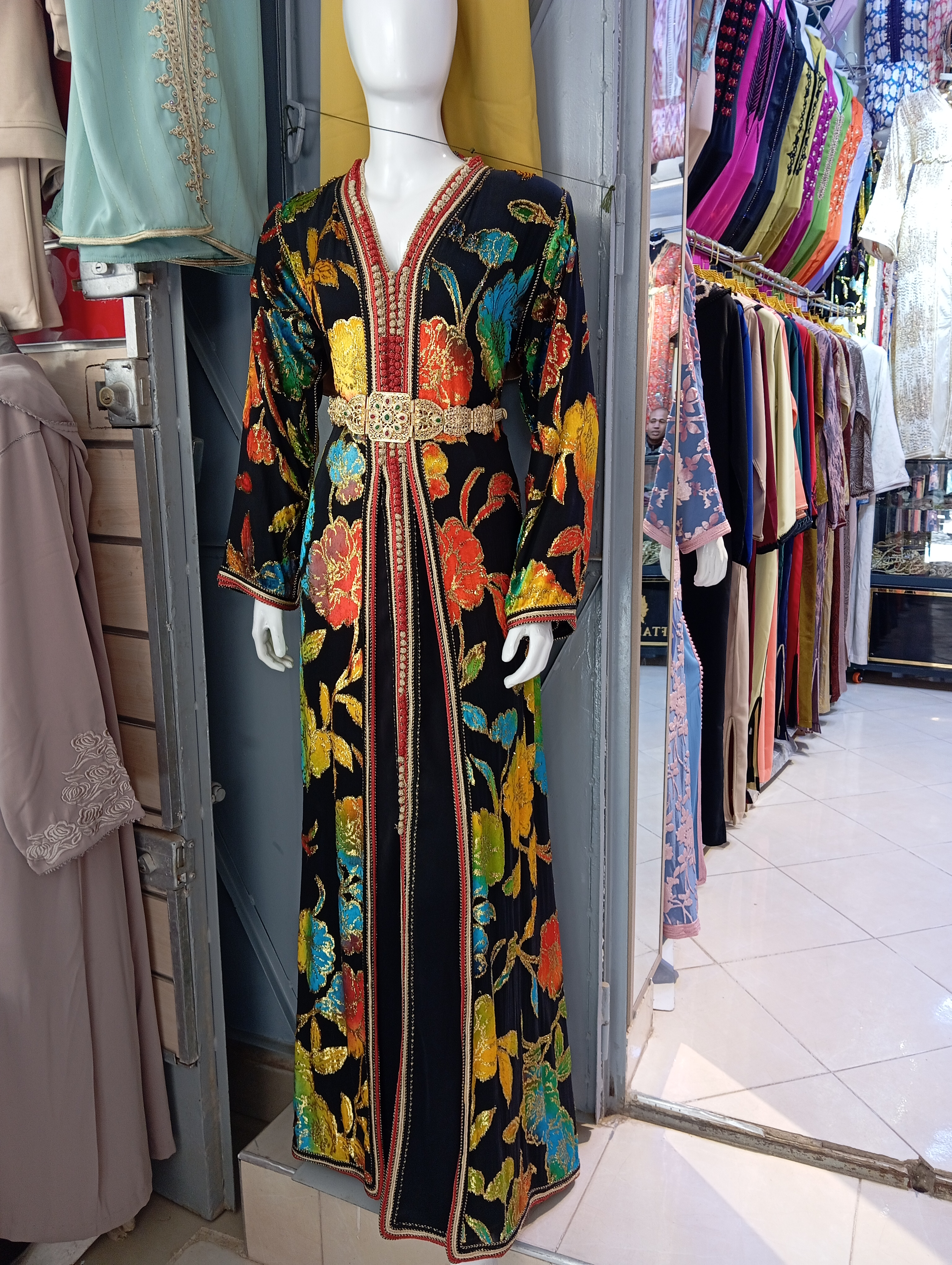
Takchita

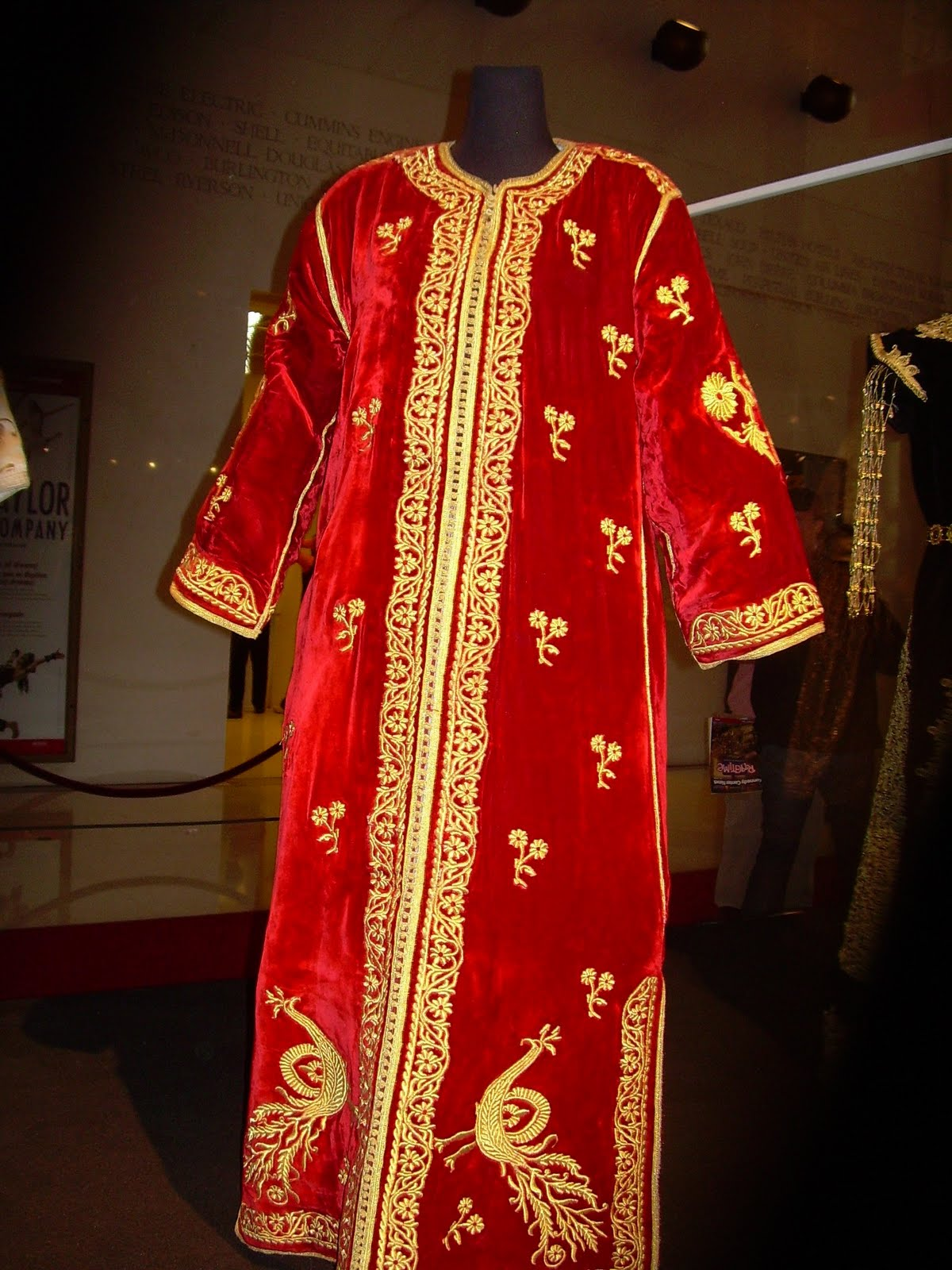
Caftan Ntaa

Caftan Bahja (with the flower patterns)

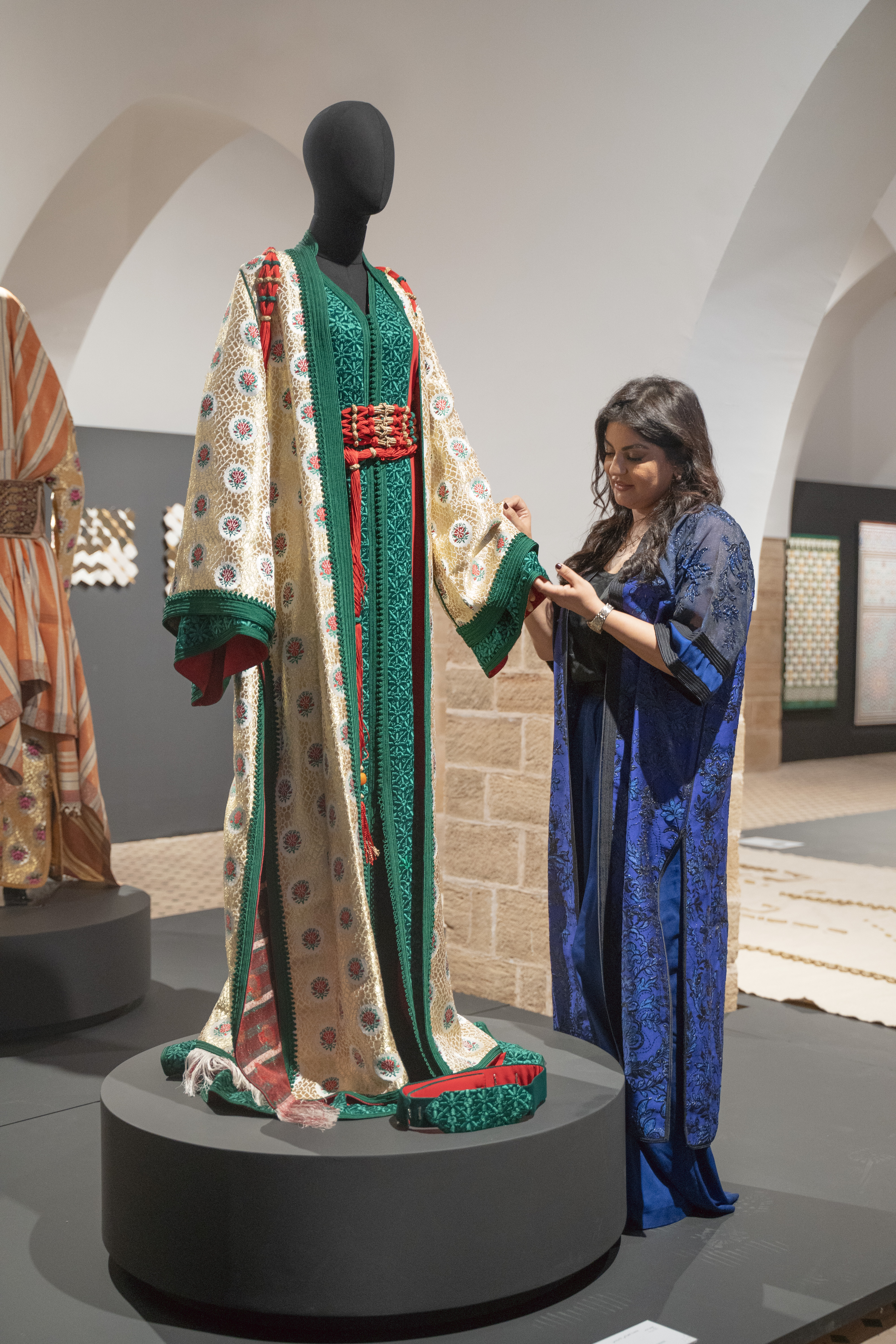
Caftan Khrib

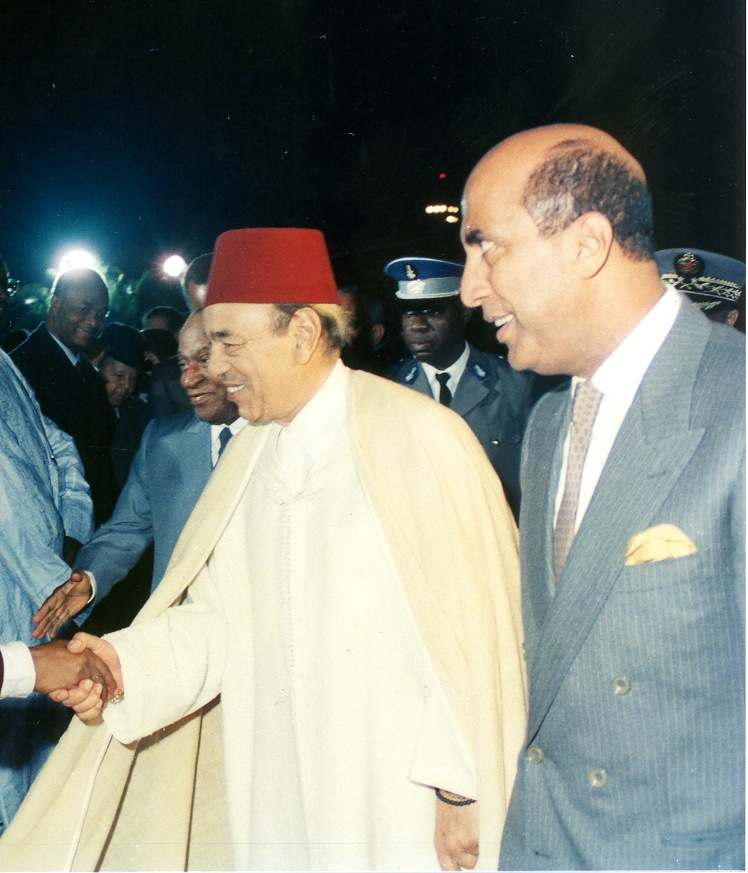
White Burnous

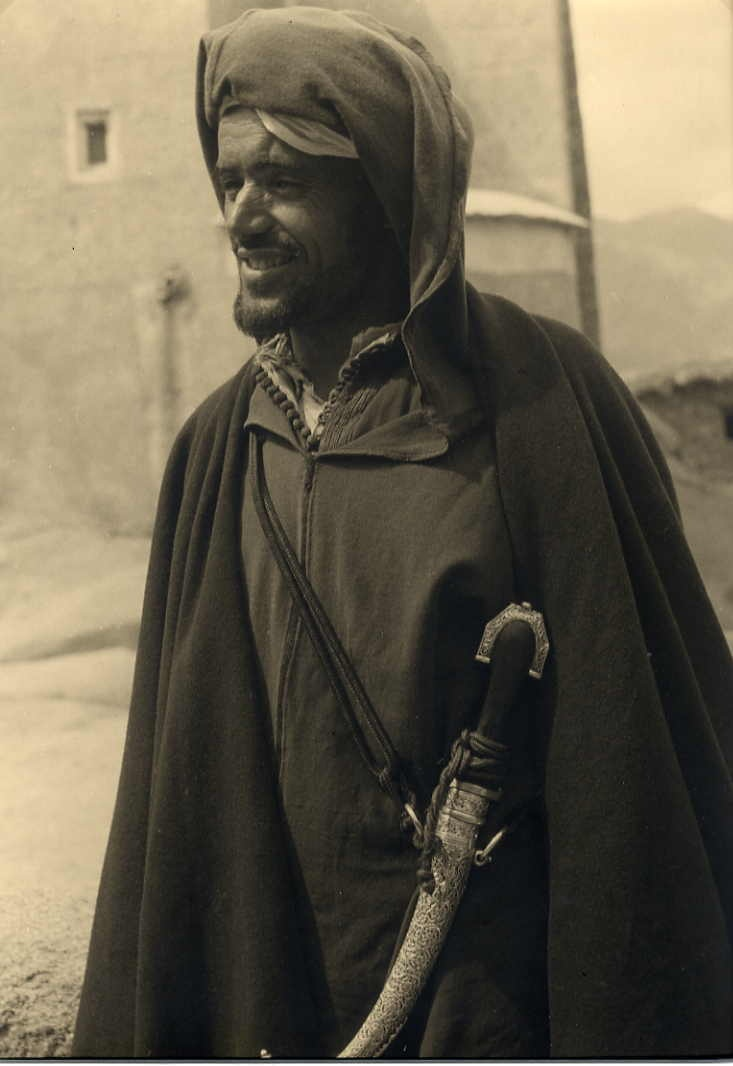
Traditional Moroccan Burnous (man of the Ait Atta)

Lebsa Aït Baamrane; (Agadir)

Tamlhaft; (Tafraout)

Tchamir; (Tafilalt)

=== Berber jewellery and clothing ===
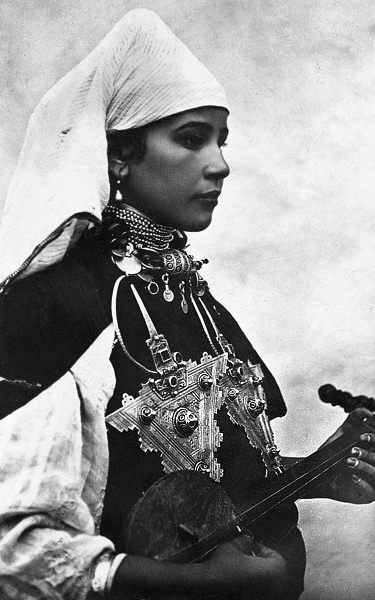
A Berber musician wearing two large triangular brooches in southern Morocco (early 20th century photo)

Among other cultural and artistic traditions, jewellery of the Berber cultures worn by Berber women and made of silver, beads and other applications was a common trait of Berber identities in large areas of the Maghreb up to the second half of the 20th century.

Traditional women clothing from the Rif region

The attire of women in Berber-speaking regions (Middle Atlas, High Atlas, Anti-Atlas, Souss-Massa) differed from urban clothing in that it met both aesthetic standards and practical needs; the garments themselves were often quite simple compared to the elaborate ornamentation. The textiles used likely depended on the herds and resources available to the Amazigh tribes. Berber women have a strong affinity for finery; their ornaments, headdresses, woven fabrics, patterns, and jewelry served as markers of identity and social status within a highly codified system. Jewelry, tazerzit (fibulae), and tattoos, the latter featuring symbolic geometric shapes—served as the primary tribal identifiers. The Berber fibula is a circular or triangular pin—large or small—fastened by a movable pin that slides within an open or closed ring. A centerpiece of the dowry, it embodies the feminine in its most fundamental aspects.

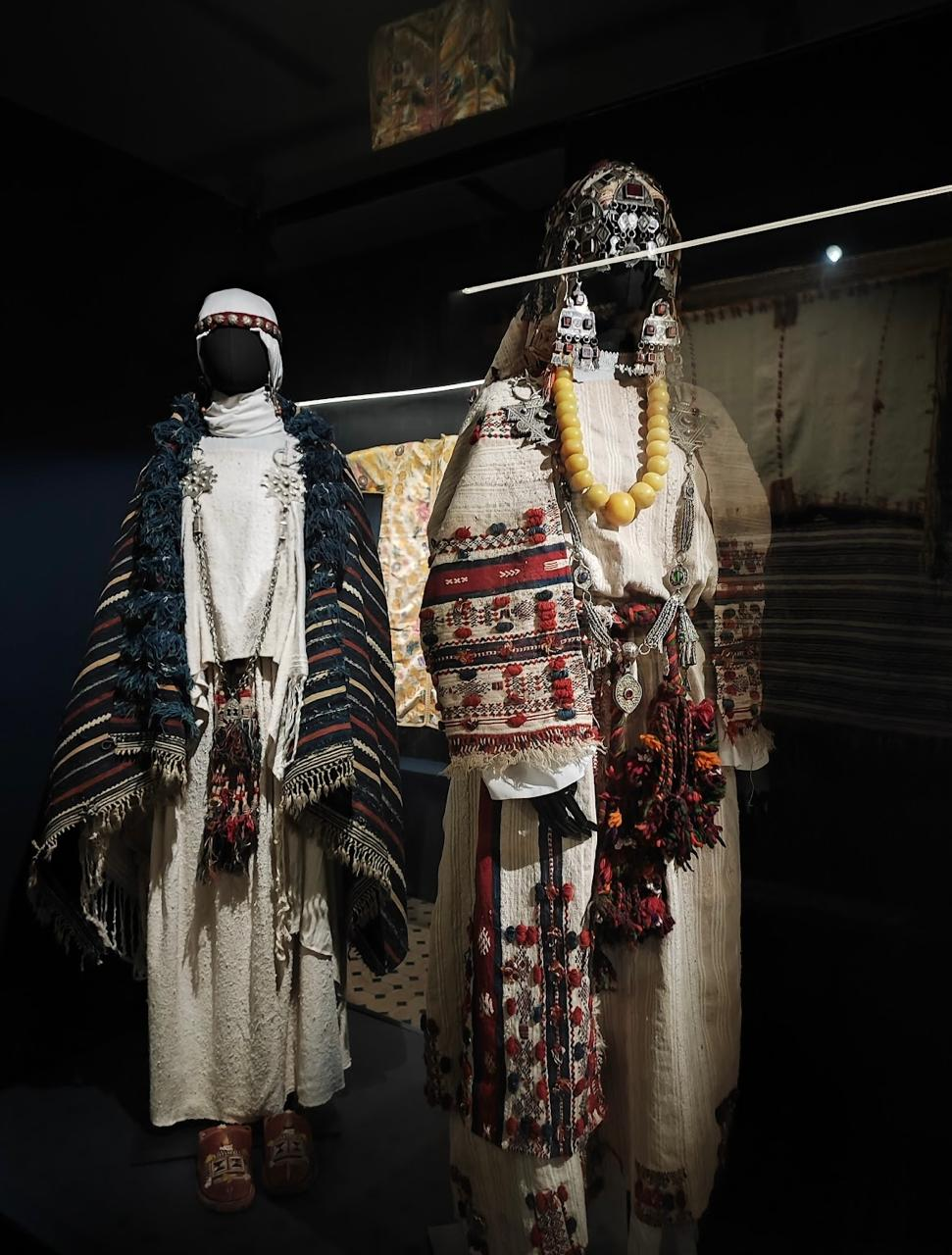
Traditional clothing of the women from the Zayane tribe

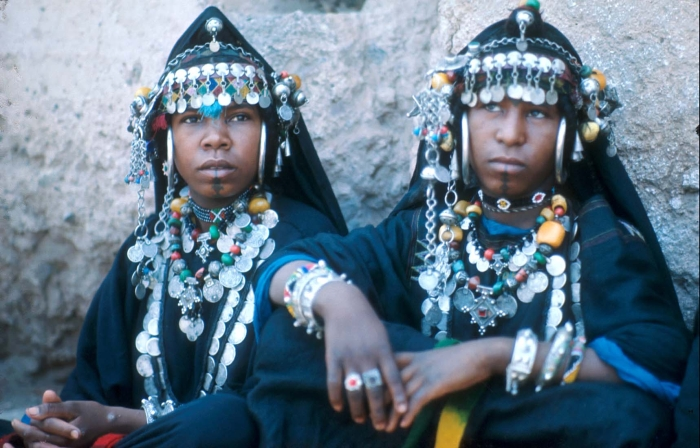
Traditional dress of Akka

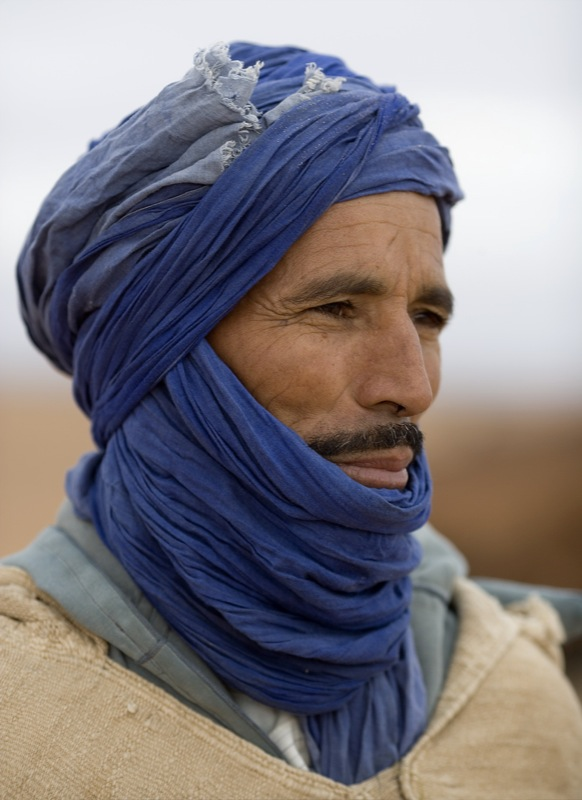
Amazigh man in the South of Morocco wearing the traditional blue veil

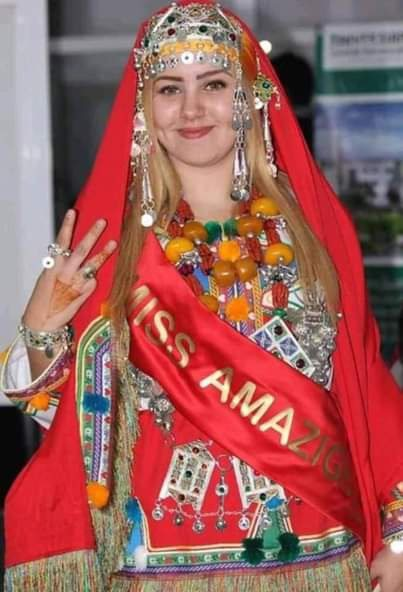
Lubna Al-Shammak, Miss Amazigh 2016 wearing a Tamlhaft

Regarding clothing, women in the regions south of the Atlas (Souss-Massa) wear a local variant of the urban haïk known as the tamlhaft (also called lizar or tafaout). This is a black or white cloth draped around the body, sometimes accessorized with a veil or distinctive horn-shaped headdresses (specific to the Aït Baamrane tribe).

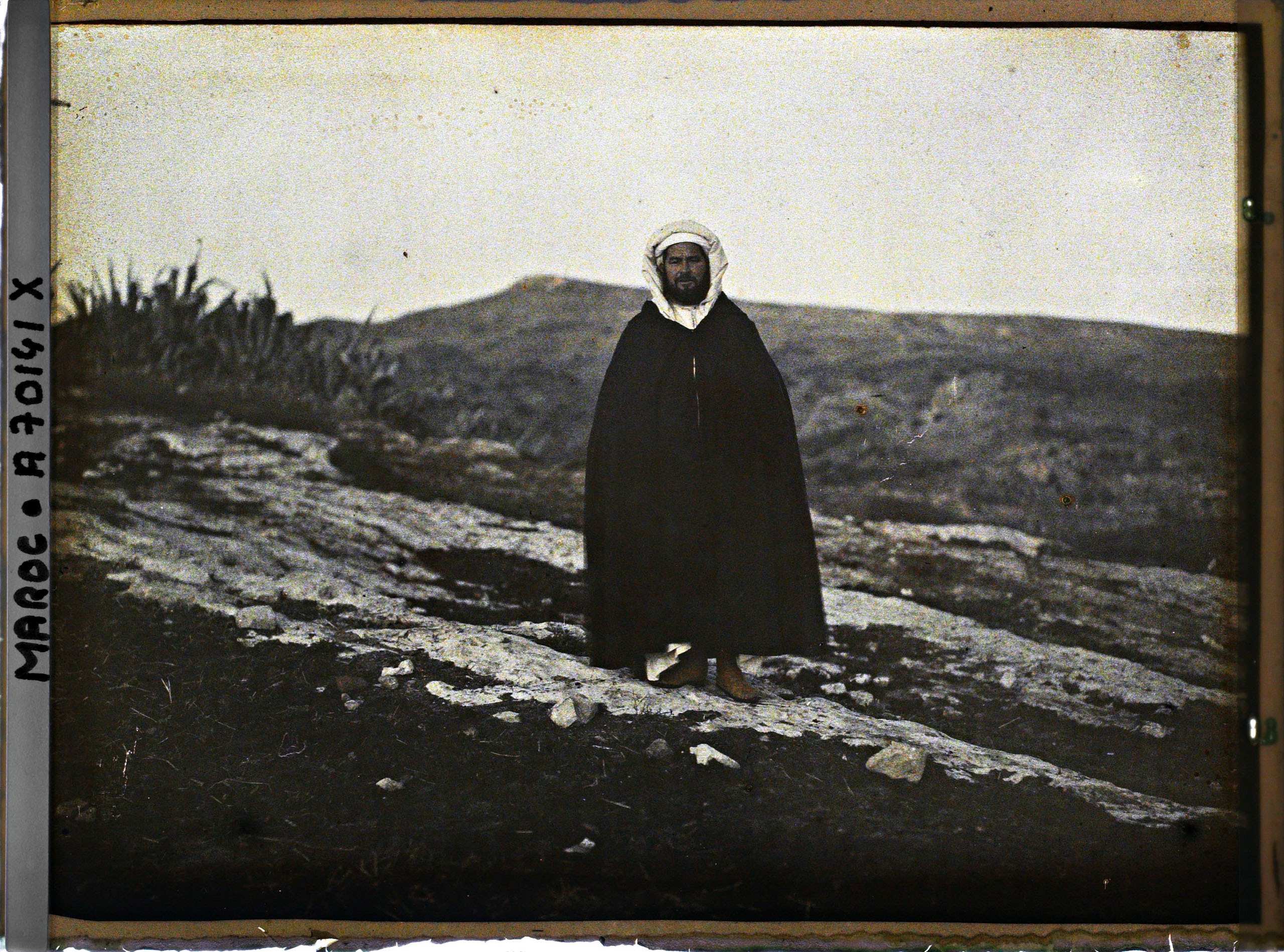
Man wearing a black woolen Burnous/ Akhniff in the Middle Atlas

Men from the Atlas Mountains wear a rural version of the burnous, made of black wool and goat hairknown as the akhniff, often accompanied by a silver dagger koumiya worn at the waist.

Their outfit may also consist of two layered, richly embroidered skirts known as takshabt.The traditional footwear of the Souss-Massa region is the idoukane a red leather slipper richly decorated with tassels and embroidered with gold threads.

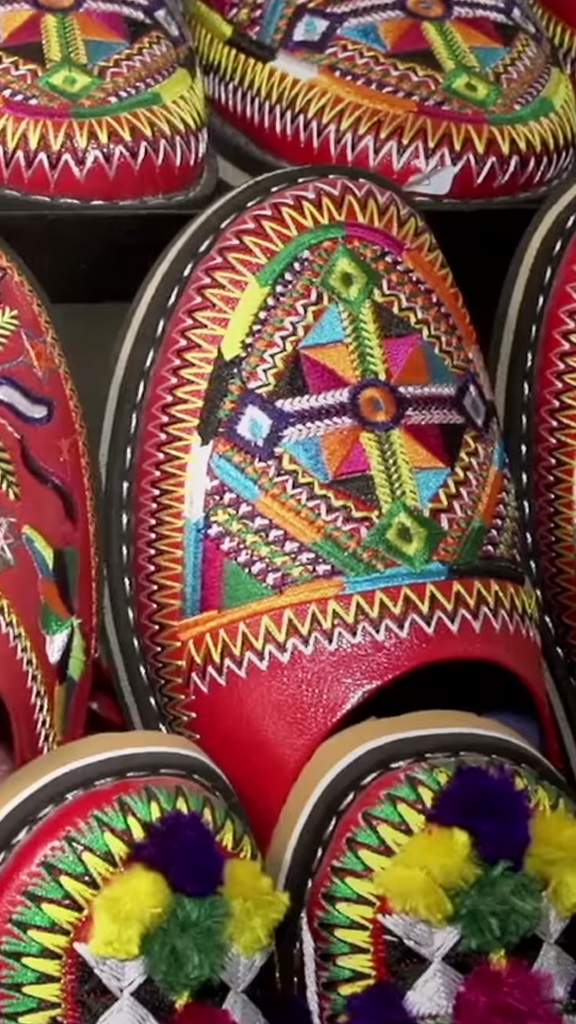
Idoukane (Soussi version of the traditional Moroccan babouches)

In the Middle Atlas, the Aït Yaazaa (a faction of the large Aït Atta tribe) have preserved the tradition of collective weddings. Women are veiled beneath a red silk headscarf (Tasbinyete) and wear traditional henna (which has largely replaced facial tattooing), a large amber necklace (Louban), and a headdress adorned with sequins and ribbon garlands.

Women from the Aït Hadidou tribe with their traditional costumes (Imilchil - 1950s to 1980s)

In the High Atlas, Aït Haddidou women from Imilchil wear the Handira a black-and-white striped wool cape during the Moussem festival. At the Rose Festival, women from Kelaat M'Gouna wear imposing headdresses featuring ribbons, sequins, colorful pom-poms, and even roses; their draped garments may also be pink, in keeping with the festive theme.

Finally, regarding hairstyles, children in the Atlas region wore the Tamzurt until the 20th century; this style involved shaving the head completely, leaving only a single braided lock. This hairstyle may be ancient, as it appears on depictions of Mashwesh Berber men on the tomb of the Egyptian King Seti. Women's hairstyles serve aesthetic and social functions similar to those of jewelry and fibulae, varying according to the specific confederation or tribe.

== Media ==
=== Photography ===
Joseph Bouhsira, active in Fes, was one of the first Moroccan photographers.

=== Cinema ===
In the first half of the 20th century, Casablanca had many movie theaters, such as Cinema Rialto, Cinema Lynx and Cinema Vox—the largest in Africa at the time it was built.

The 1942 American film Casablanca is supposedly set in Casablanca and has had a lasting impact on the city's image, though it was filmed entirely in California and doesn't feature a single Moroccan character with a speaking role. Salut Casa! was a propaganda film brandishing France's purported colonial triumph in its civilizing mission in the city.

Mostafa Derkaoui's 1973 film About Some Meaningless Events (Arabic: أحداث بلا دلالة) was screened twice in Morocco before it was banned under Hassan II.

Love in Casablanca (1991), starring Abdelkarim Derqaoui and Muna Fettou, was one of the first Moroccan films to deal with Morocco's complex realities and depict life in Casablanca with verisimilitude. Bouchra Ijork's 2007 made-for-TV film Bitter Orange achieved wide support among Moroccan viewers. Nour-Eddine Lakhmari's Casanegra (2008) depicts the harsh realities of Casablanca's working classes. The films Ali Zaoua (2000), Horses of God (2012), Much Loved (2015), and Ghazzia (2017) of Nabil Ayouch—a French director of Moroccan heritage—deal with street crime, terrorism, and social issues in Casablanca, respectively. The events in Meryem Benm'Barek-Aloïsi's 2018 film Sofia revolve around an illegitimate pregnancy in Casablanca. Hicham Lasri and Said Naciri also from Casablanca.

Atlas Studios in Warzazat is a large movie studio.

==== Movies in Morocco ====
- 1944: Establishment of the "Moroccan Cinematographic Center" (CCM/the governing body). Studios were open in Rabat.
- 1958: Mohammed Ousfour creates the first Moroccan movie "Le fils maudit".
- 1982: The first national festival of cinema – Rabat.
- 1968: The first Mediterranean Film Festival was held in Tangier. The Mediterranean Film Festival in its new version is held in Tétouan.
- 2001: The first International Film Festival of Marrakech was held in Marrakesh.

Some directors have set films in Morocco. In 1952 Orson Welles chose Essaouira as the setting for several scenes in his adaptation of Shakespeare's "Othello", which had won the Grand Prix du Festival International du Film at that year's Cannes Film Festival. In 1955, Alfred Hitchcock directed The Man Who Knew Too Much and in 1962, David Lean shot the Tafas Massacre scene of Lawrence of Arabia in the city of "Ouarzazate", which houses Atlas Studios. Aït Benhaddou has been the setting of many films. The film Hideous Kinky was filmed in Marrakesh.

== Architecture ==
=== Qsur ===
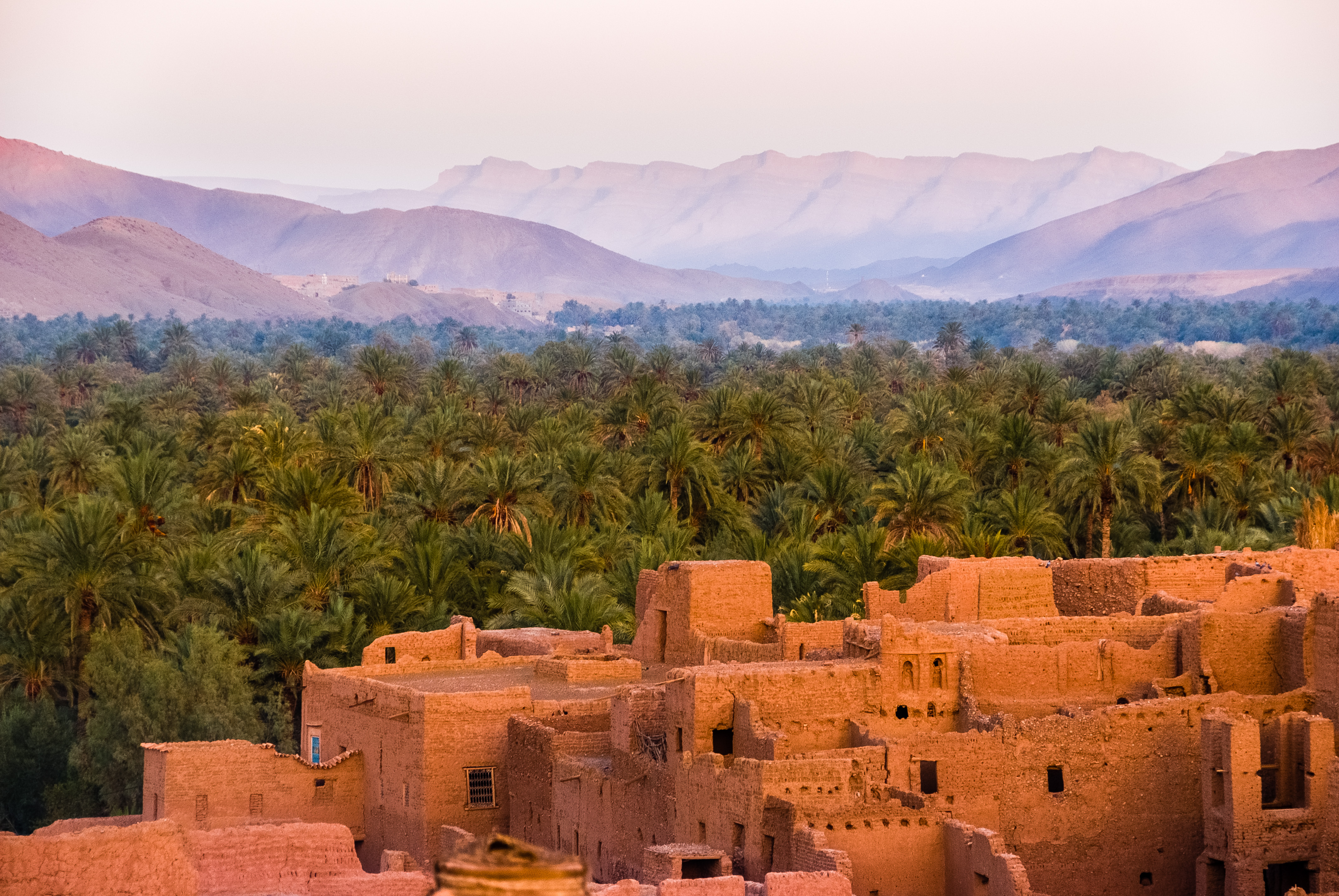
Qsar Tamnugalt, a qsar near Agdz in the Draa Valley

A qsar (Arabic: قصر), (p. qsur) is a North African fortified village. There are over 300 qsur and qasbas the Draa Valley, particularly in the area between Agdz and Zagora.

=== Agadirs ===
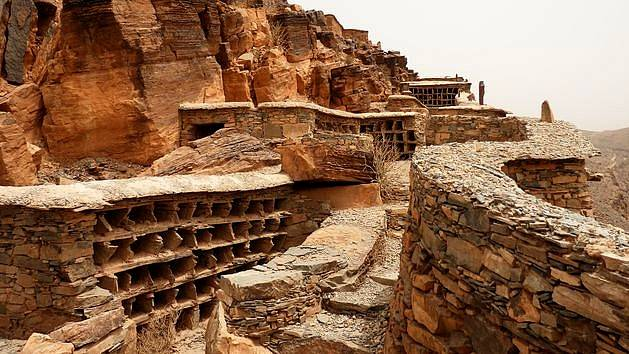
The Id Aissa Agadir near Amtoudi in the Anti-Atlas region

An agadir, not to be confused with the city Agadir, is a communal granary traditionally found in Shilha communities in southern Morocco.

=== Gardens ===
Andalusi gardens, inherited from Morisco refugees who settled in Morocco, are a prominent feature of Moroccan architecture. These have been used in building palaces such as the Bahia Palace in Marrakesh. The Andalusi garden, which usually features a burbling fountain, has an important role in cooling riads: the evaporation of water is an endothermic chemical reaction, which absorbs heat from the area garden and surrounding rooms.

Morocco has many notable gardens, including the Majorelle Garden in Marrakesh and the Andalusian Garden in the Kasbah of the Udayas in Rabat.

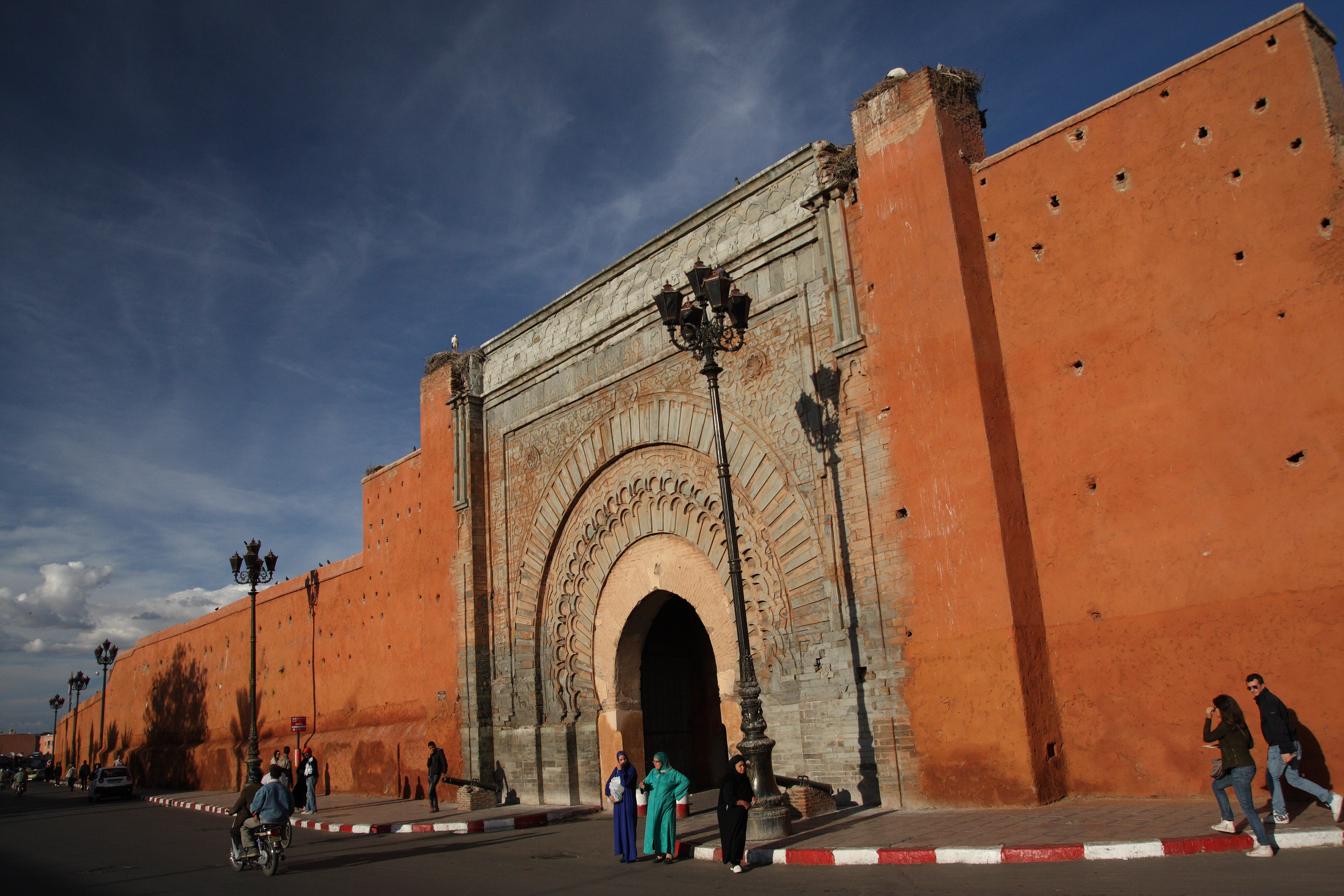
The gates of Marrakesh

=== Domestic architecture ===
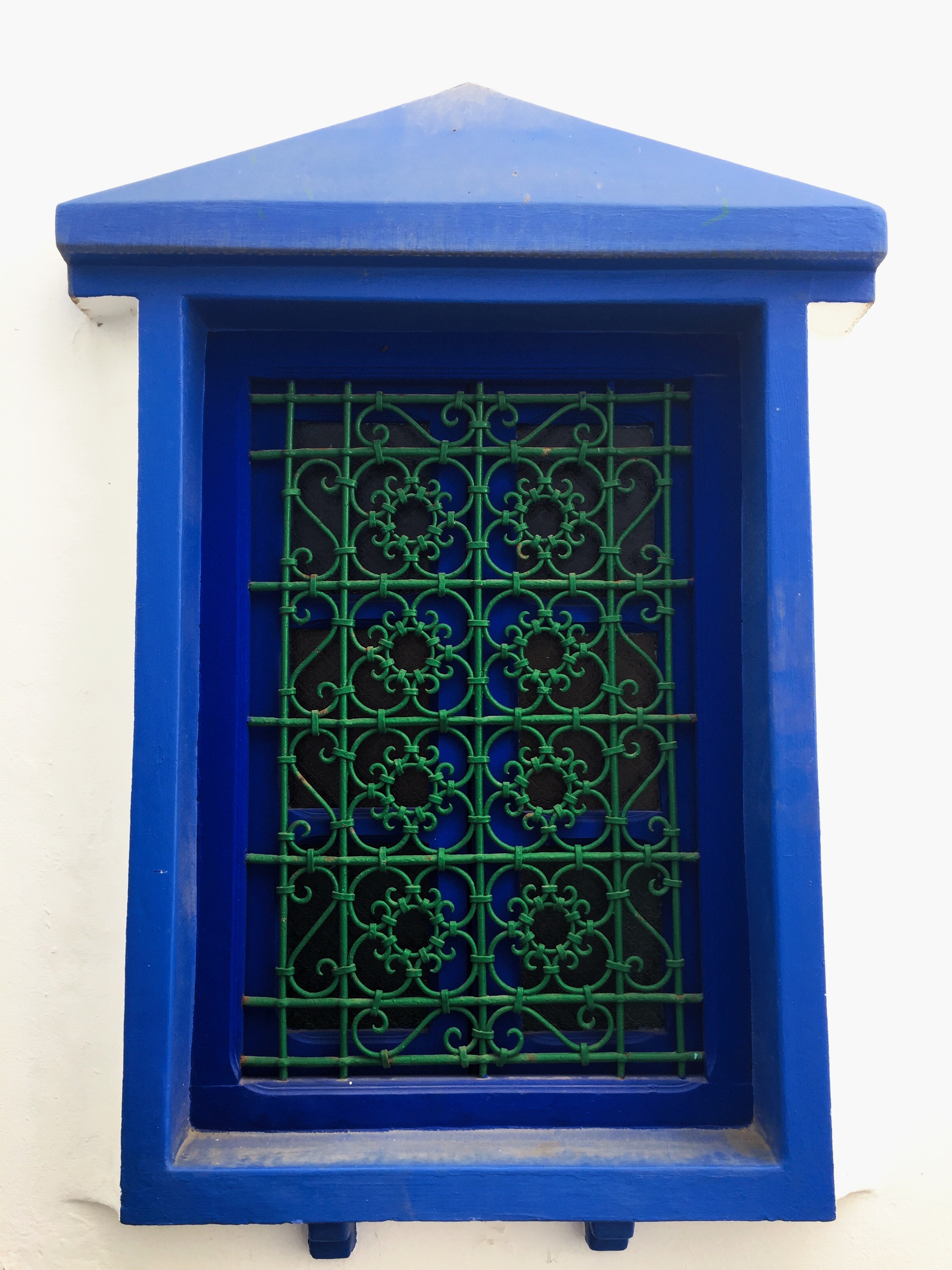
A window displaying a wrought iron window grill in Asila. The knots are tied with bent metal in the traditional way, rather than soldered.

Dar (Arabic: دار), the name given to one of the most common types of domestic structures in Morocco, is a home found in a medina, or walled urban area of a city. Most Moroccan homes traditionally adhere to the Dar al-Islam, a series of tenets on Islamic domestic life. Dar exteriors are typically devoid of ornamentation and windows, except occasional small openings in secondary quarters, such as stairways and service areas. These piercings provide light and ventilation. Dars are typically composed of thick, high walls that protect inhabitants from thievery, animals, and other such hazards; however, they have a much more symbolic value from an Arabic perspective. In this culture the exterior represents a place of work, while the interior represents a place of refuge. Thus, Moroccan interiors are often very lavish in decoration and craft.

Consistent with most Islamic architecture, dars are based around small open-air patios, surrounded by very tall thick walls, to block direct light and minimize heat. Intermediary triple-arched porticos lead to usually two to four symmetrically located rooms. These rooms have to be long and narrow, creating very vertical spaces, because the regional resources and construction technology typically only allow for joists that are usually less than thirteen feet.

Upon entering a dar, guests move through a zigzagging passageway that hides the central courtyard. The passageway opens to a staircase leading to an upstairs reception area called a dormiria, which often is the most lavish room in the home adorned with decorative tilework, painted furniture, and piles of embroidered pillows and Moroccan rugs. More affluent families also have greenhouses and a second dormiria, accessible from a street-level staircase. Service quarters and stairways were always at the corners of the structures.

==== Ziliij ====
Ziliij (Arabic: الزليج), colorful geometric mosaic tile work, is a decorative art and architectural element commonly found in Moroccan mosques, mausolea, homes, and palaces. These probably evolved from Greco-Roman mosaics, which have been found in cities such as Volubilis and Lixus.

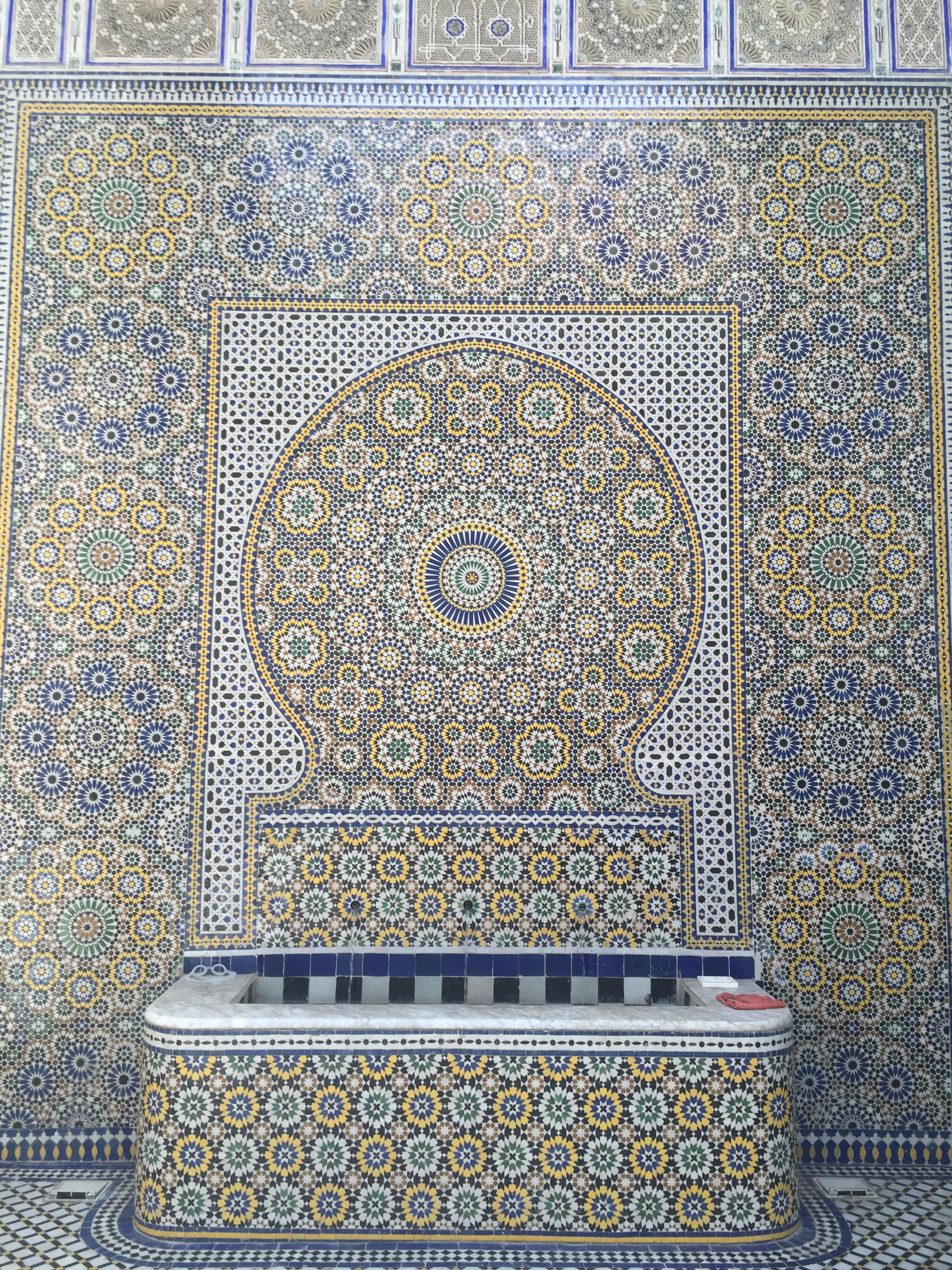

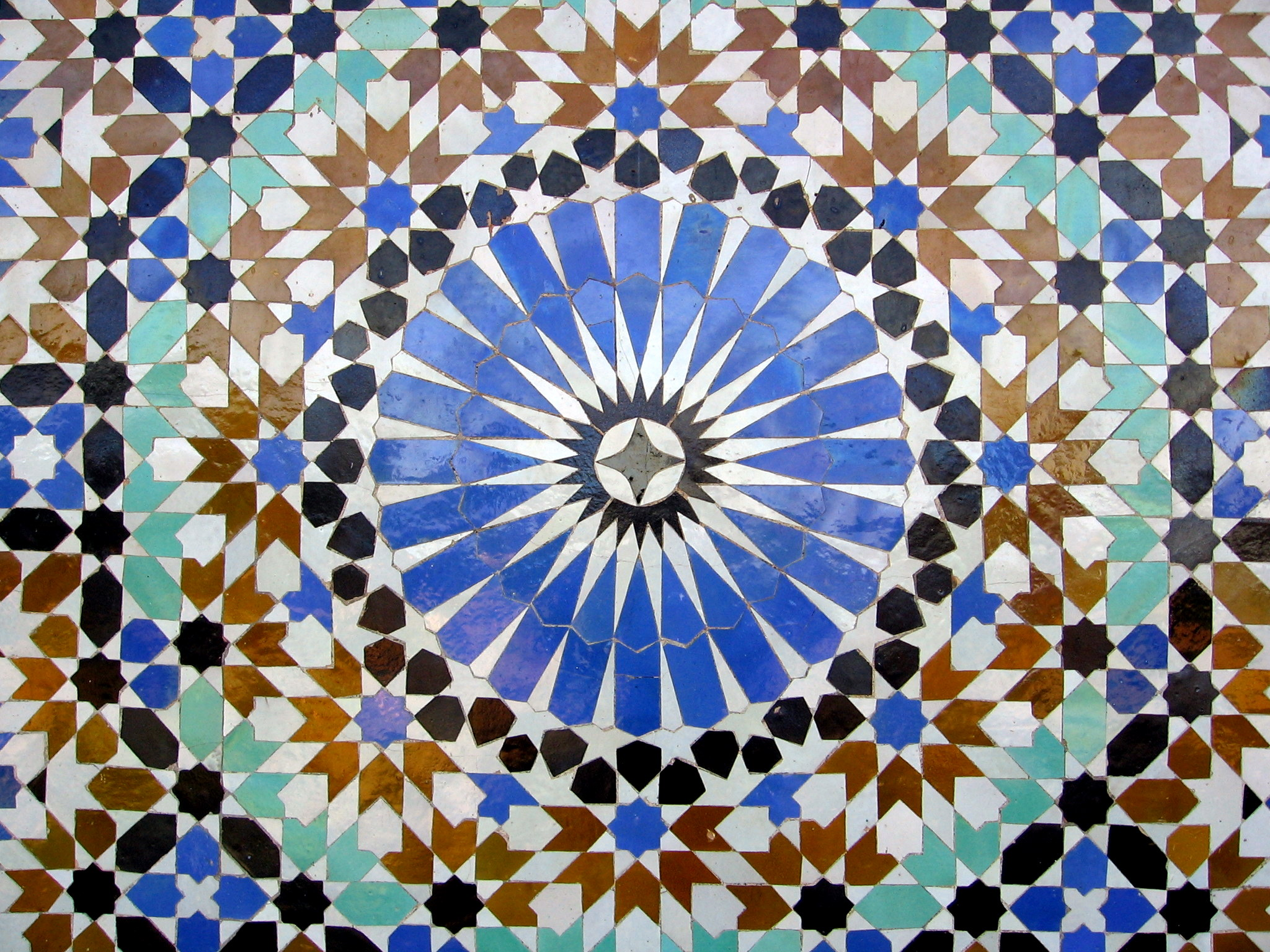

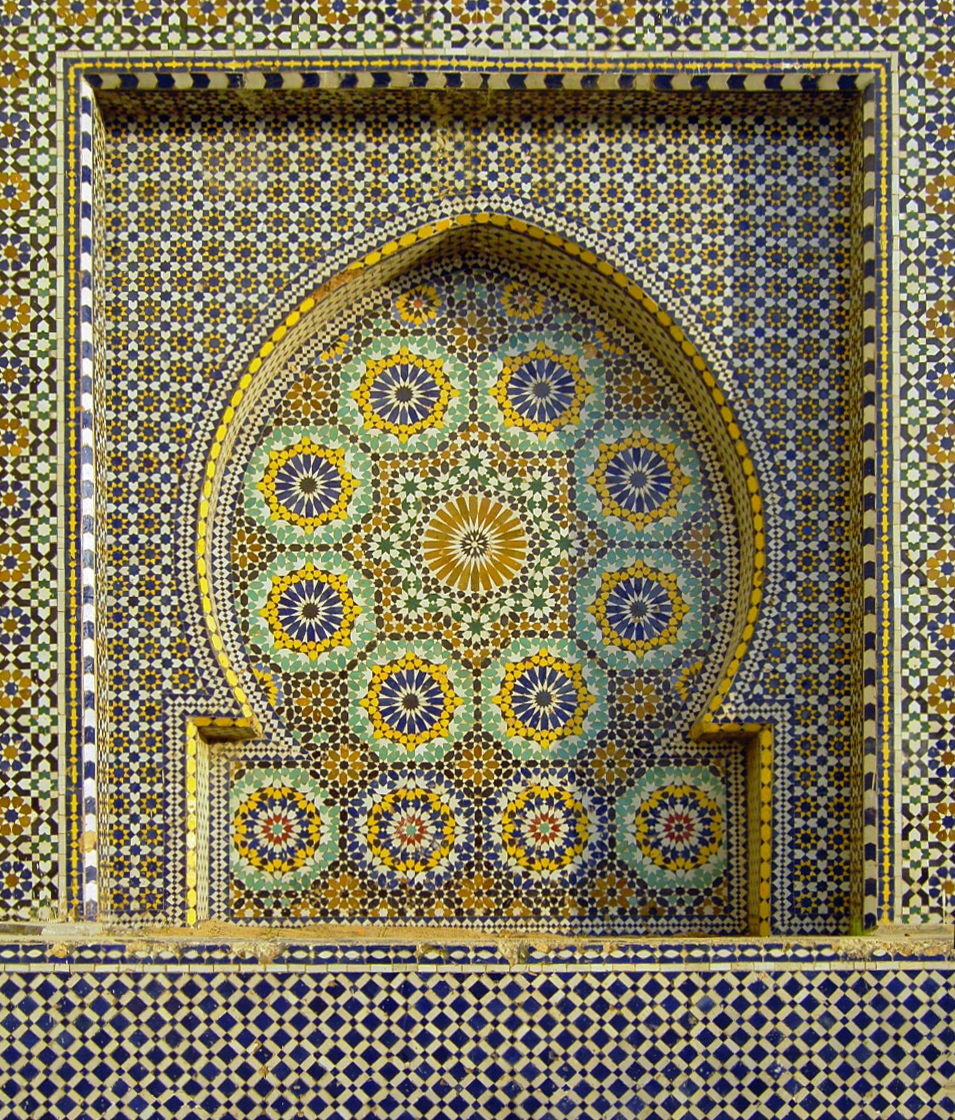

=== Modernist architecture ===
In the mid to late 20th century, architects such as Elie Azagury, Jean-François Zevaco, Abdeslam Faraoui, Patrice de Mazières, and Mourad Ben Embarek marked the architecture of Casablanca and other parts of Morocco with significant works of modernist and brutalist architecture.

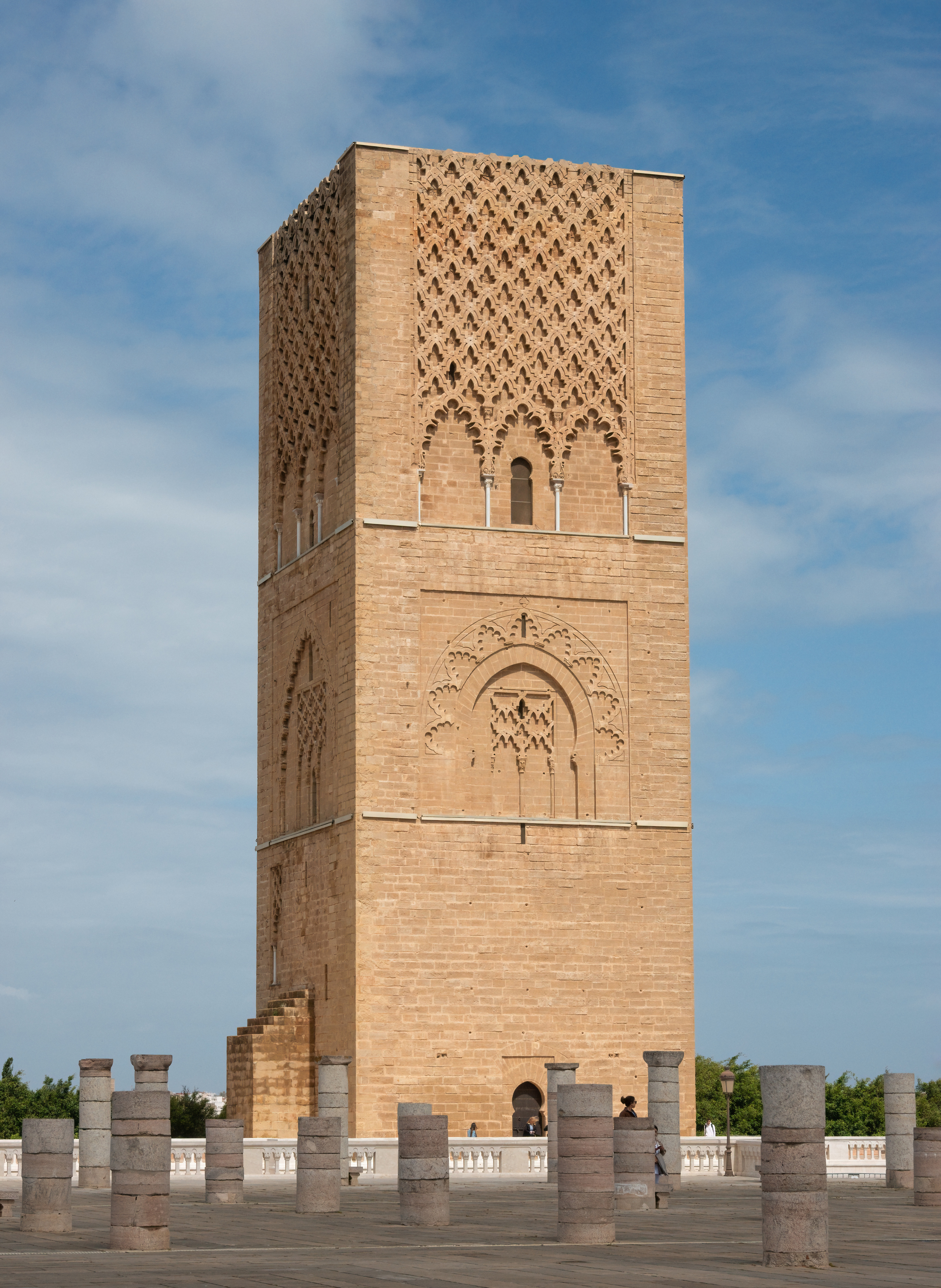
Hassan Tower; (Rabat)

Roman city of Volubilis

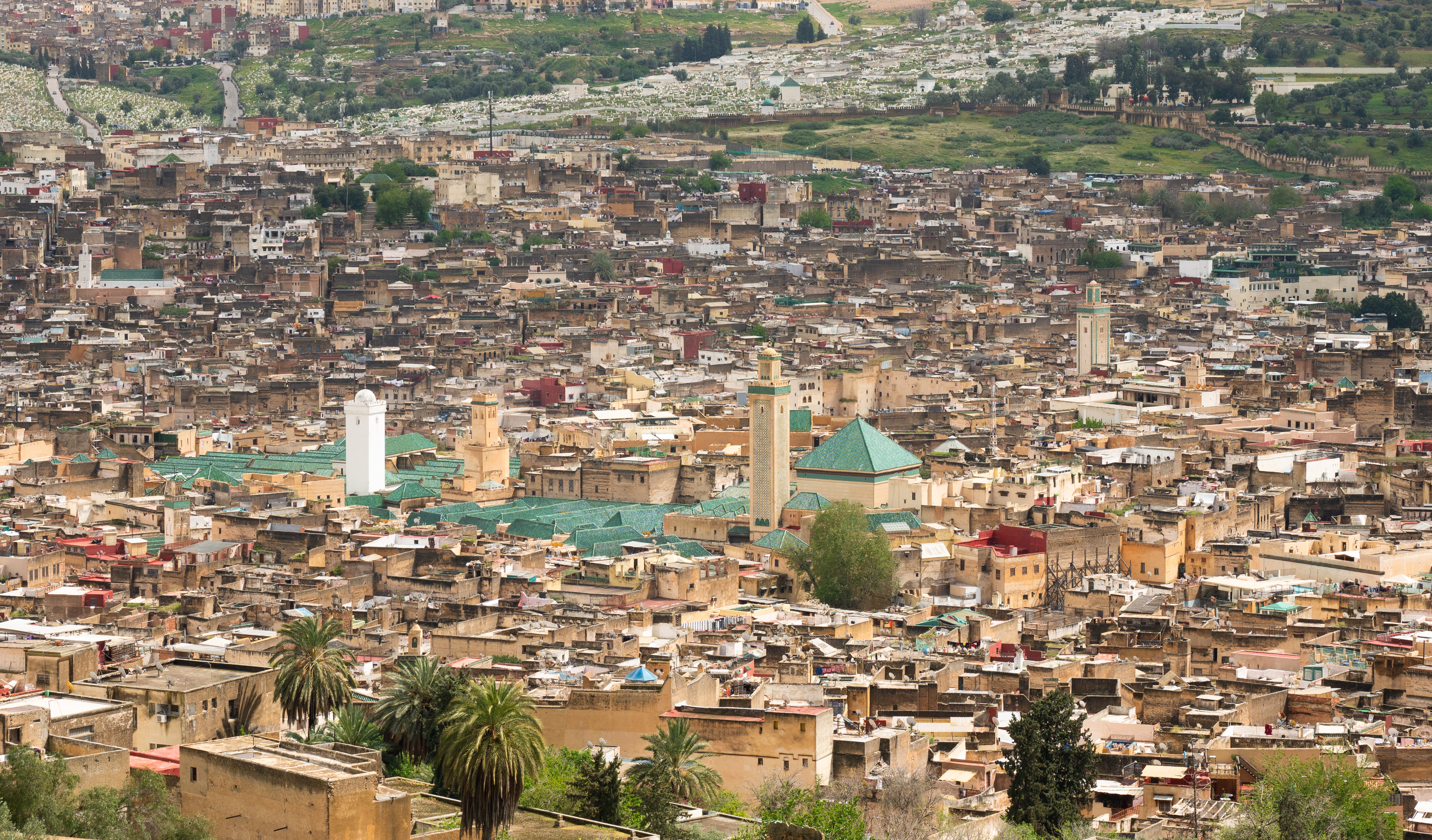
Medina of Fes

Ruins of the ancient city of Lixus

Medersa el-Attarine

El Badi Castle; Marrakesh

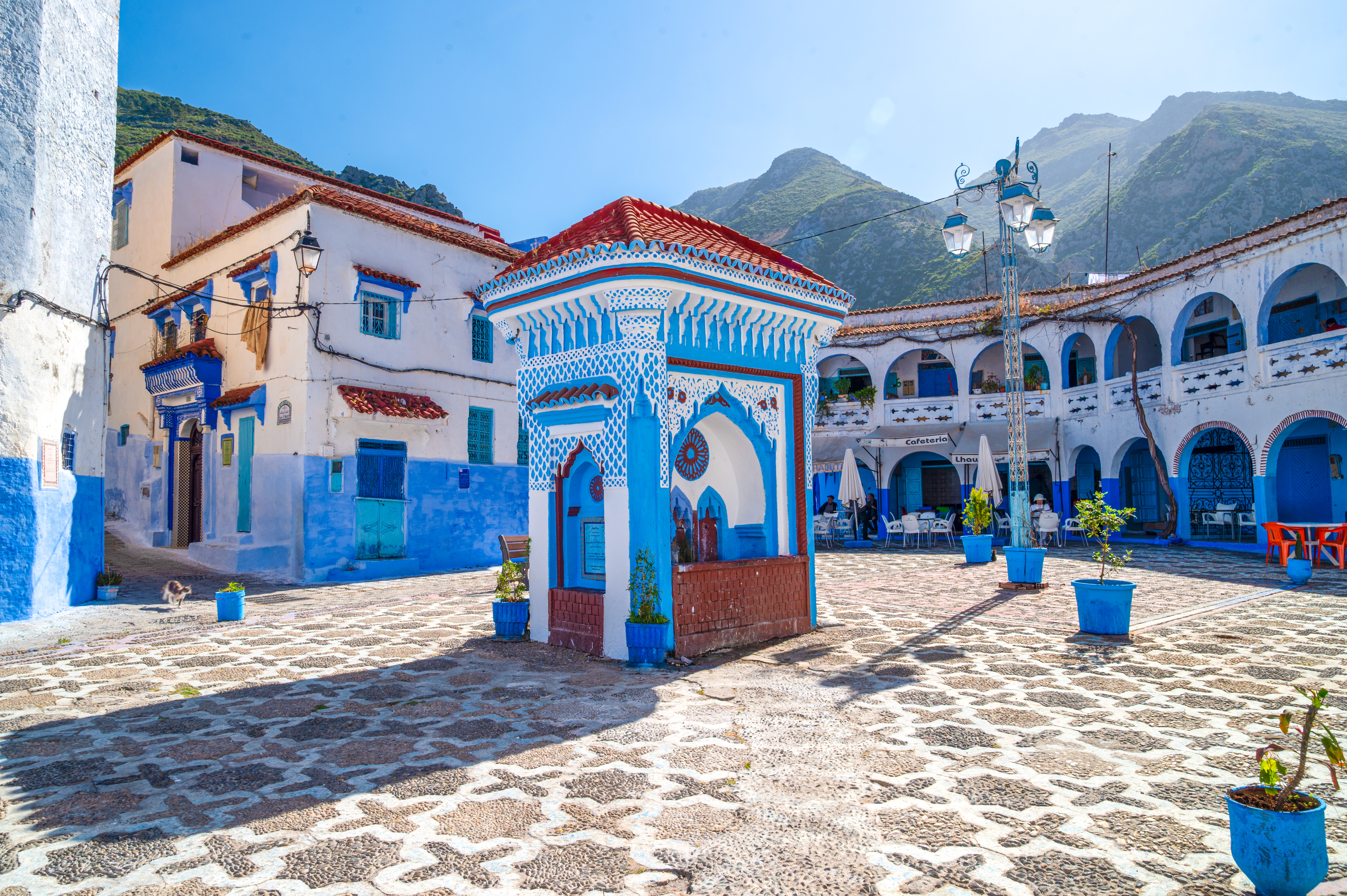
The blue city of Chefchaouen

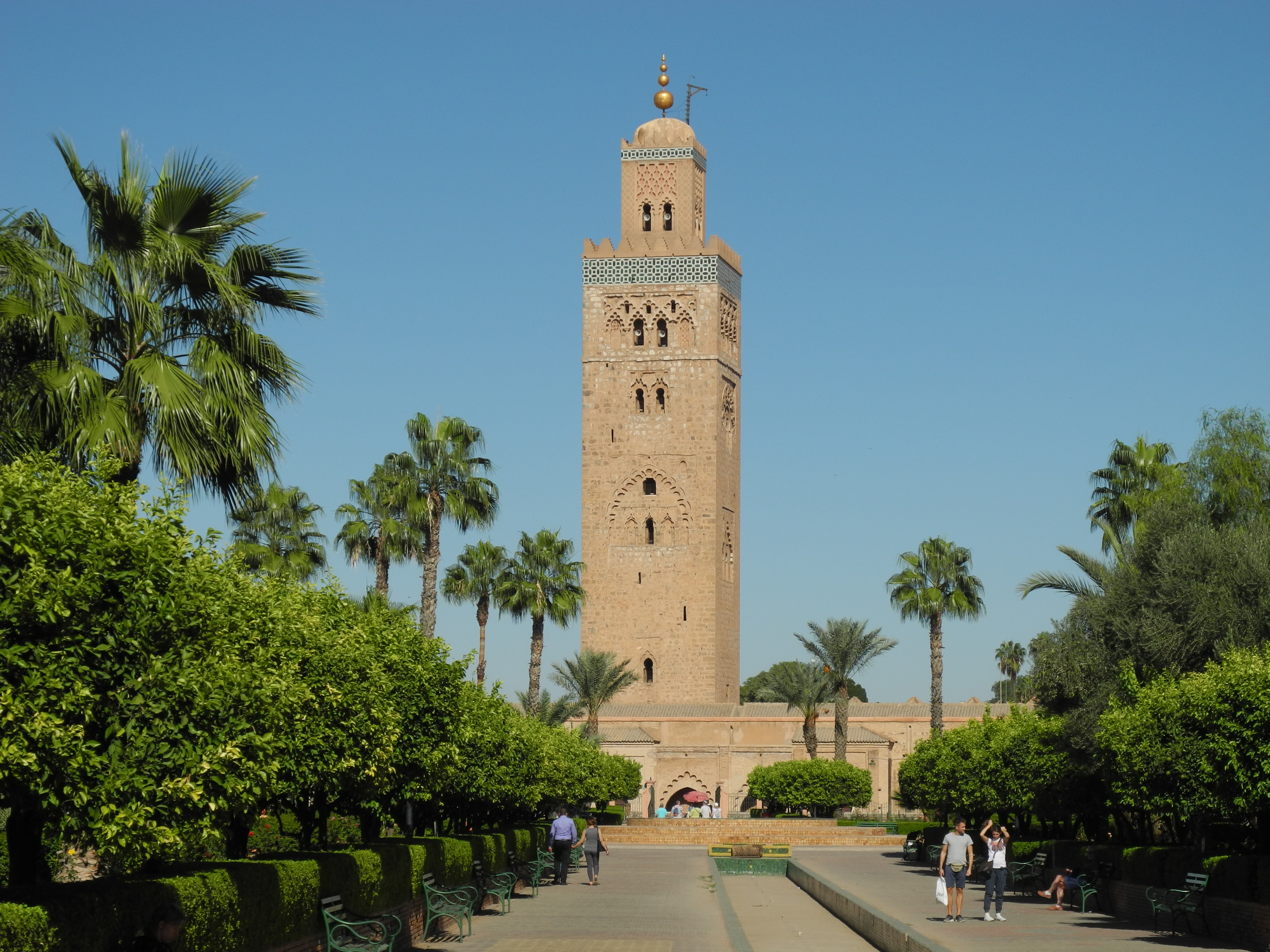
Koutoubia

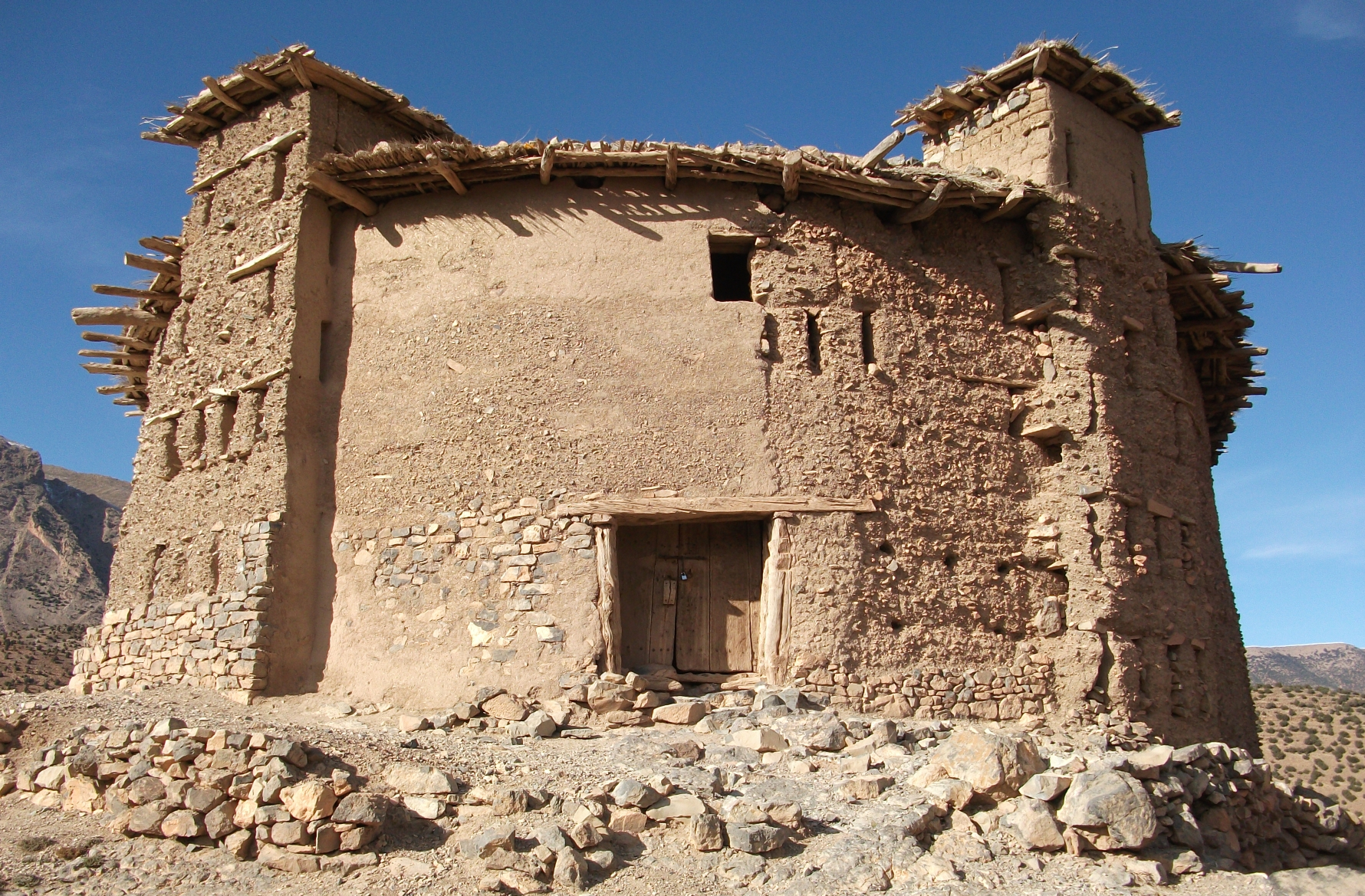
Amazigh traditional Attic (Igoudar);

Hassan II mosque

Essaouira

== See also ==
- Negafa - Traditional dresser for Moroccan weddings
- Berber culture
- Arab culture
- List of botanical gardens
- List of museums in Morocco
- Moroccan American League
- Sport in Morocco
- Horses in Morocco

== Bibliography ==
- Verner, Corince. (2004). The villas and riads of Morocco. New York: Harry N. Abrams, Inc., Publishers
