= List of Intangible Cultural Heritage elements in Morocco =

Location of Morocco

The United Nations Educational, Scientific and Cultural Organization (UNESCO) defines intangible cultural heritage (Arabic: التراث الثقافي اللامادي)elements as non-physical traditions and practices performed by a people. As part of a country's cultural heritage, they include celebrations, festivals, performances, oral traditions, music, and the making of handicrafts. The term intangible cultural heritage is formally established by the Convention for the Safeguarding of the Intangible Cultural Heritage, which was drafted in 2003 and took effect in 2006. The inscription of new heritage elements on UNESCO's Intangible Cultural Heritage Lists for protection and safeguarding is determined by the Intergovernmental Committee for the Safeguarding of Intangible Cultural Heritage, an organization established by the Convention. Morocco ratified the Convention on 6 July 2006. It has served on the Intangible Cultural Heritage Committee from 2010 to 2014 and from 2020 to 2024.

Morocco registered the first two elements on the UNESCO lists (the Cultural space of Jemaa el-Fna Square and Moussem of Tan-Tan) in 2008. As of 2025, Morocco has registered sixteen elements on the UNESCO lists, one of which, Taskiwin martial dance, is on the List of Intangible Cultural Heritage in Need of Urgent Safeguarding. National lists are required by the Convention for the further nomination of elements to the UNESCO lists.

== Historical overview ==
Perceiving the threat by city development plans to the historical square Jemaa el-Fnaa in Marrakesh, many residents of the city mobilized to protect it, and its millennial cultural heritage. This inspired the creation of UNESCO's list of intangible cultural heritage, in which several countries became involved.

== Intangible Cultural Heritage of Humanity ==
+ Transnational element

=== Representative List ===
Intangible Cultural Heritage elements recognized by UNESCO
Name	Media	Year	No.	Description
Moussem of Tan-Tan		2008	00168	It was classified under Masterpieces of the Oral and Intangible Heritage of Humanity, and is an annual festival that preserves the folklore of the region. It is characterized by its multitude of aspects, such as music, dance, rituals, mythology, practices related to nature and the universe, and skills relevant to traditional crafts and various other areas of culture.
Cultural space of Jemaa el-Fnaa		2008	00014	The origins of Jamaa El-Fnaa square hail back from the very inception of Marrakesh around 1070-1071 AD, under the Almoravids, who established it as a market. It became more popular once Koutoubia mosque was built around a century later. The square is considered a symbol of the city, and one of its most attractive cultural areas, where a variety of traditional performances are on display.
Cherry festival in Sefrou		2012	00641	Morocco is an important producer of cherries (locally called حب الملوك, the kings' grain) with around 7,000 tons annually. The harvest is usually between the end of May and the beginning of July. The cherry festival of Sefrou was started in 1920, and is attended by, locals, Moroccans from other cities and foreigners alike. The celebrations take place yearly in June, over three days, at the end of the harvest period. The festival involves the choosing of a Miss Beauty, and used to be a symbol of religious co-existence, due to the participation of Muslim, Jewish and Christian girls. After the Moroccan independence from France, the French population left, soon followed by the Moroccan Jewish community, and the participants now are exclusively from the local Muslim population.
Mediterranean diet + (Note: Shared with Croatia, Cyprus, Greece, Italy, Spain, and Portugal.)		2013	00884	The Mediterranean diet characterizes the traditional cuisines of several Mediterranean countries from Morocco to Greece, including southern Italy and Spain. The basis of this diet is the consumption of large quantities of olive oil, legumes, whole grains, unprocessed grains, fruits, vegetables, and an average to high quantity of fish. Moroccan cuisine is considered among the oldest and most diverse in the world. It has a mix of influences from Amazigh, Middle Eastern, Mediterranean and African cuisines. According to some experts, it is considered the best in the Arab world and in Africa, and the third best in the world.
Argan, practices and know-how concerning the argan tree		2014	00955	Table argan oil is obtained manually through the efforts of women specialized in this process, who transmit this know-how from mother to daughter. They break the solid core of the argan fruit, remove its crust, and cook it on fire. Then they manually grind it using a millstone made specifically for argan. The resulting dough is squeezed by hand to extract the oil. To obtain argan oil used for cosmetics, the grains are not heated, but ground raw to extract the oil. It's worth noting that to obtain 1 L of argan oil for cosmetics, 70 argan grains are required. Argan oil is often given as a wedding gift, and is widely used to prepare various festive dishes such as Amlu, a staple in Moroccan cuisine that mixes argan oil with almond and honey. Amlu is mainly consumed at breakfast with bread and Moroccan tea.
Date palm, knowledge, skills, traditions and practices + (Note: Shared with Bahrain, Egypt, Iraq, Jordan, Kuwait, Mauritania, Oman, Palestine, Saudi Arabia, Sudan, Tunisia, United Arab Emirates, and Yemen. In 2022, Qatar was added to the list.)		2019, 2022	01509, 01902	Date palm and practices around it have strong cultural and historical significance in the Middle East and North Africa. For centuries, the date palm has been a source of nutrition, as well as a key component of numerous crafts, professions, and social and cultural traditions. The tree is typically found in dry, temperate climates, and its roots penetrate deeply into the earth in search of humidity. The cultural relevance of the date palm is evident in the commitment of local communities to sustain it through collective participation in multiple date-palm related activities and numerous festive rituals, traditions, and customs. In 2019, the element was inscribed on UNESCO's Representative List of the Intangible Cultural Heritage of Humanity, recognizing the pivotal role of the date palm in strengthening the connection between people and the land in the Arab region.
Gnawa		2019	01170	Gnawa music is a centuries-old Moroccan practice rooted in African music and rituals, and Sufi traditions. It is a set of musical events, performances, fraternal practices, and rituals, believed to have therapeutic power, mixing the secular with the sacred. Gnawa is primarily a Sufi brotherhood music combining lyrics with a generally religious content, that invokes ancestors and spiritual themes. Going back to at least the 16th century, Gnawa is considered an important element within Moroccan culture. It is performed at a "lila", communal nights of celebration dedicated to prayer and healing guided by the Gnawa maalem, or master musician.
Knowledge, know-how and practices pertaining to the production and consumption of couscous + (Note: Shared with Algeria, Mauritania, and Tunisia.)		2020	01602	Couscous is a Berber dish that is beloved across northern Africa's Maghreb region and beyond. The knowledge, know-how, and practices related to the production and consumption of couscous have been recognized for their cultural value. Preparing couscous is a ceremonial process that involves several different operations, beginning with growing the cereal. The grains are then hand-rolled and steamed in a special pot called a couscoussier. The dish is often served with vegetables, meat, or fish, and is a staple food in many North African countries, including Morocco. The inscription of couscous traditions on UNESCO's list is a testament to the cultural significance of this dish and the communities that have preserved its preparation and consumption practices for generations.
Arabic calligraphy: knowledge, skills and practices + (Note: Shared with Algeria, Bahrain, Egypt, Iraq, Jordan, Kuwait, Lebanon, Mauritania, Oman, Palestine, Saudi Arabia, Sudan, Tunisia, United Arab Emirates, and Yemen.)		2021	01718	Arabic calligraphy is the practice of transforming and stretching the letters of the Arabic alphabet to convey numerous motifs. It was originally developed to make writing easily understandable and gradually came to be included in marble and wood carving, embroidery, and metal etching, among other art forms. Traditionally the writing instrument, known as the Qalam, is made from bamboo stems and reeds. The ink is created using honey, black soot, and saffron. The handmade paper is treated with starch, egg white and alum. More modern forms use markers, synthetic paint, and spray paint. It is passed down both informally and formally, through schools and apprenticeships.
Tbourida		2021	01483	Tbourida is a traditional Moroccan equestrian performance that dates back to the 16th century. It is also known as "fantasia" and is a simulation of a succession of military parades, reconstructed according to ancestral Arab-Amazigh conventions and rituals. Each parade of Tbourida is performed by a troop, called "Sorba", consisting of an odd number of riders and horses, usually between 15 and 25. Tbourida is an equestrian art that requires a high level of skill, coordination, and discipline. The riders and horses must be in perfect harmony to perform the synchronized movements and create the sound of gunpowder that characterizes Tbourida. Tbourida is not only a performance but also a social event that brings together families, friends, and communities. It is an occasion to celebrate, to share, and to strengthen bonds, and is associated with moussems, agricultuiral festivals, and a variety of other celebrations, familial and national.
Falconry + (Note: Austria, Belgium, Croatia, Czechia, France, Germany, Hungary, Ireland, Italy, Kazakhstan, Republic of Korea, Kyrgyzstan, Mongolia, Netherlands, Pakistan, Poland, Portugal, Qatar, Saudi Arabia, Slovakia, Spain, Syria, and United Arab Emirates.)		2021	01708	Falconry is considered a traditional recreational activity in Morocco, which was practiced by several Moroccan tribes.
Arts, skills and practices associated with engraving on metals (gold, silver and copper) + (Note: Shared with Algeria, Egypt, Iraq, Mauritania, Palestine, Saudi Arabia, Sudan, Tunisia, and Yemen.)		01951	2023	Metals such as gold, silver and copper have been engraved for centuries. Using various tools, symbols, names, Quran verses, prayers and geometric patterns are cut into the metals. The meanings and uses of the engraved metals will vary by community. However, they can be used for jewelry, household objects, wedding gifts, traditional medicine, and in religious ceremonies. The engraving techniques are taught by family members, although they can also be passed down through formal means—such as universities, workshops, organizations and organizations—as well as informal ones like cultural events, publications, and social media.
Malhun, a popular poetic and musical art		2023	01592	Malhun is a kind of urban, sung poetry that comes from the exclusively masculine working-class milieu of craftsmen's guilds.
Henna, rituals, aesthetic and social practices + (Note: Shared with Algeria, Saudi Arabia, Bahrain, Egypt, United Arab Emirates, Iraq, Jordan, Kuwait, Palestine, Mauritania, Oman, Qatar, Sudan, Tunisia, and Yemen.)		2024	02116	Derived from a deciduous tree, henna is a paste used for temporary adornments on the body, usually the hands and feet. The tree is considered sacred in North African and Middle Eastern communities, sometimes being used in traditional medicine. the leaves are harvested twice a year and processed to create a paste. Songs, proverbs, poems, and other practices are tied with the tradition of using henna.
Moroccan Caftan: art, traditions and skills		2025	02077	

=== Elements in Need of Urgent Safeguarding ===
This list covers elements that are endangered and thus require appropriate safeguarding.

Endangered elements recognized by UNESCO
Name	Media	Year	No.	Description
Taskiwin, martial dance of the western High Atlas		01256	2017	Taskiwin is a martial dance that originated in the western High Atlas mountain range in Central Morocco. The dance involves shaking one's shoulders to the rhythm of tambourines and flutes while carrying a decorated horn called the Tiskt. It is considered a means of socialization for young people and a way to foster social cohesion and harmony, but due to denigration of traditions by young people today, it is in danger of extinction, with only a few villages still practicing it.

== See also ==
- List of World Heritage Sites in Morocco
