= Ouarzazate International University Film Festival =

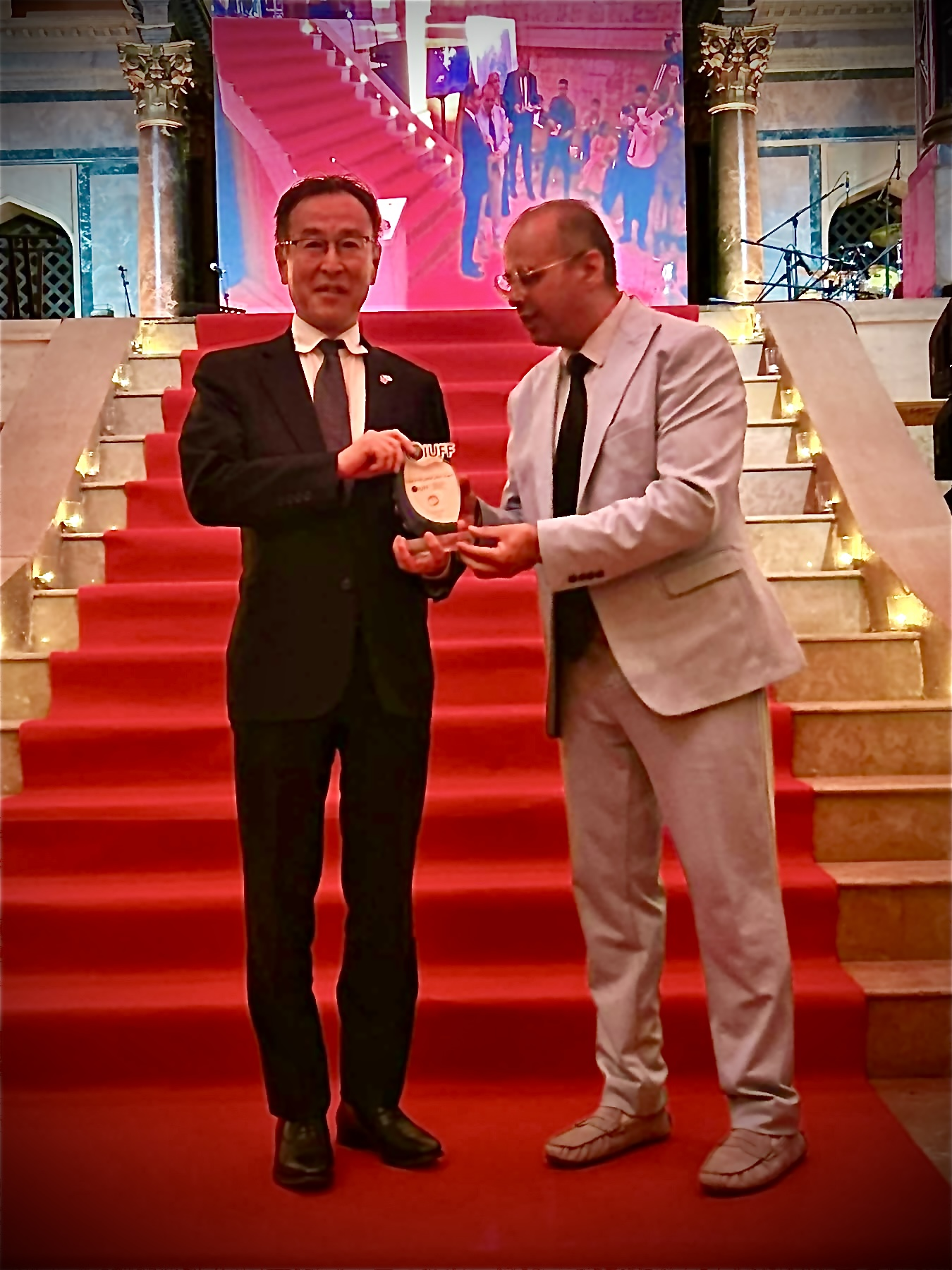
Rabii el-Jawhari, director and founder of the festival, presents the OIUFF Trophy to His Excellency Masahiro Nakata, Ambassador of Japan to Morocco and Guest of Honor at the festival.

The Ouarzazate International University Film Festival (OIUFF) is a film festival in Ouarzazate, Morocco. It was first held April 28–30, 2026. The theme of the first year was a celebration of 70 years of diplomatic relations between Japan and Morocco. The festival also examined the role of artificial intelligence in the creative process. The heart of the event is an international student film competition, supplemented with academic panels, screenings, and workshops.

== Film competition ==
The 2026 international film competition included twelve student-directed films. The jury was chaired by Nora Skalli and also included James Callanan and Sofia Nevakivi. The international Grand Prize went to the film "Cats" (2025) by Danilo Stanimirovic, who is Serbian.

== Screenings ==
The festival included a screening of the experimental film "Floods" by directors Roderick Coover and Vidikis Adams. The partially AI-generated film was presented on three screens and accompanied by live musical performance. Other screenings included the Japanese film Godzilla Minus One.

== Workshops and educational activities ==
OIUFF offers workshops designed for cinema students. Sessions reported for the first edition include:

- Desktop cinema workshop led by Alberto Angellini (Albert Figurt) (MIT)
- Transition from idea to documentary workshop, led by Youssef Afifi (Moroccan director)
- Reflection on philosophy of editing workshop, led by Rabii El Jawhari (Center of Excellence for Cinema and Audiovisual in Ouarzazate)
- Immersive Cinema, led by Ali Hossaini (King's College, London)

== Opening and closing ceremonies ==
OIUFF blends regional, national and international musical styles on stage In 2026, the musical centerpiece was orchestrated by Dr. Montassir Hmala, who served as maestro of the accompanying ensemble, thereby embodying the festival's ethos of cultural fusion of Ahwash, an Amazigh style with international idioms. It also presents renewed film scores shot in Ouarzazate.

== Honorary tributes ==
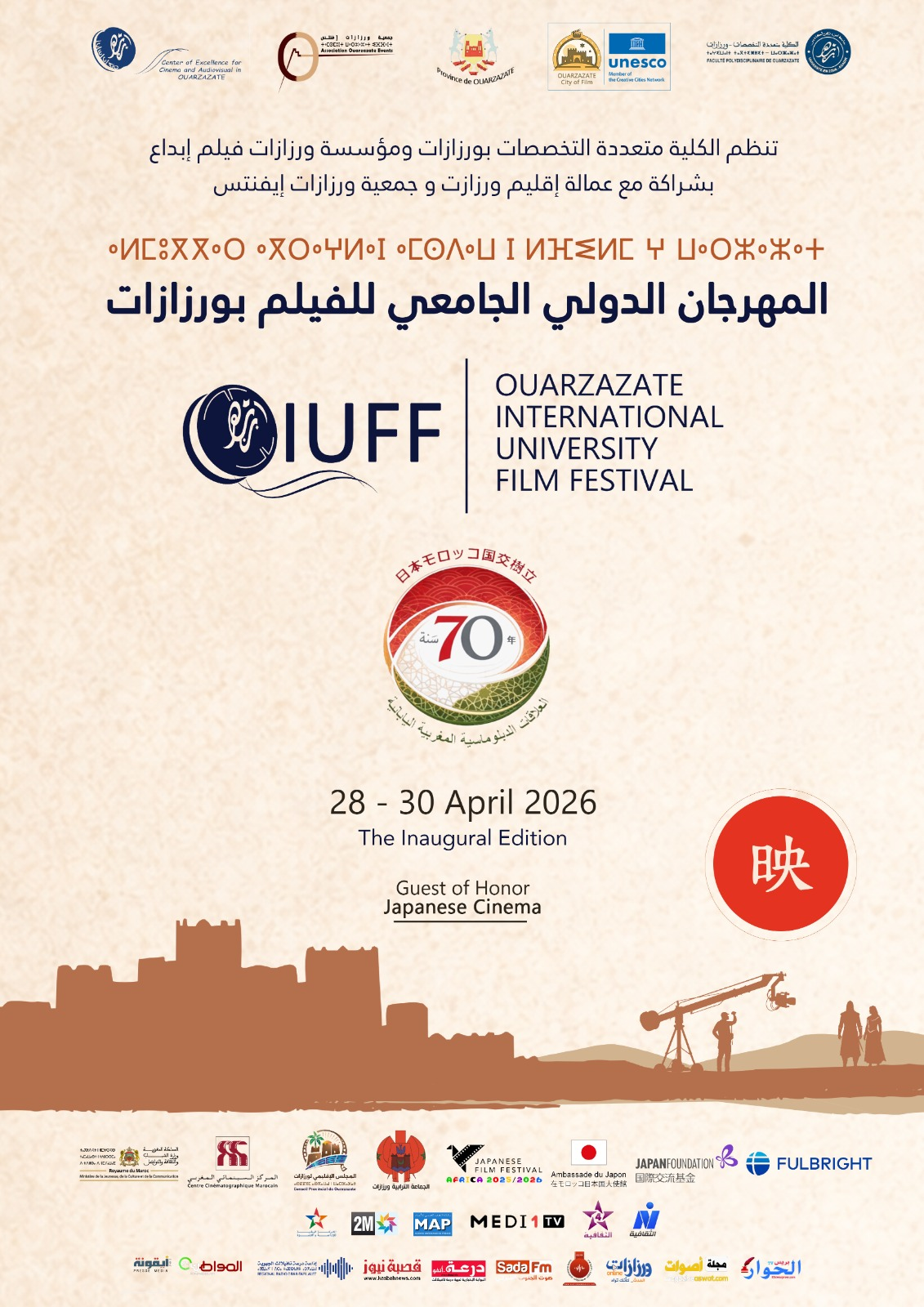
OIUFF 1st Edition Poster.

OIUFF pays tributes to figures who have contributed to cinema across the national and international world. Among those celebrated are Moroccan actor Driss Roukhe and Moroccan actress Salima Benmoumen, acknowledged for their enduring impact on performance, Dr. Nick Montfort of MIT, honored for his contributions to computational media and digital culture, Egyptian actors Ryad el-Kholy and Enas Mekki, for their influential performances within the industry, and Egyptian filmmaker Sherine Adil, recognized for her innovative narrative craftsmanship and contribution to cinema. The OIUFF also paid tribute to two Ouarzazi crew members, Brahim Choukri and Noureddine Aberdene, whose behind-the-scenes work has been instrumental to not only regional film productions but also international ones.
