= Jemaa el-Fnaa =

Moroccan cultural heritage site

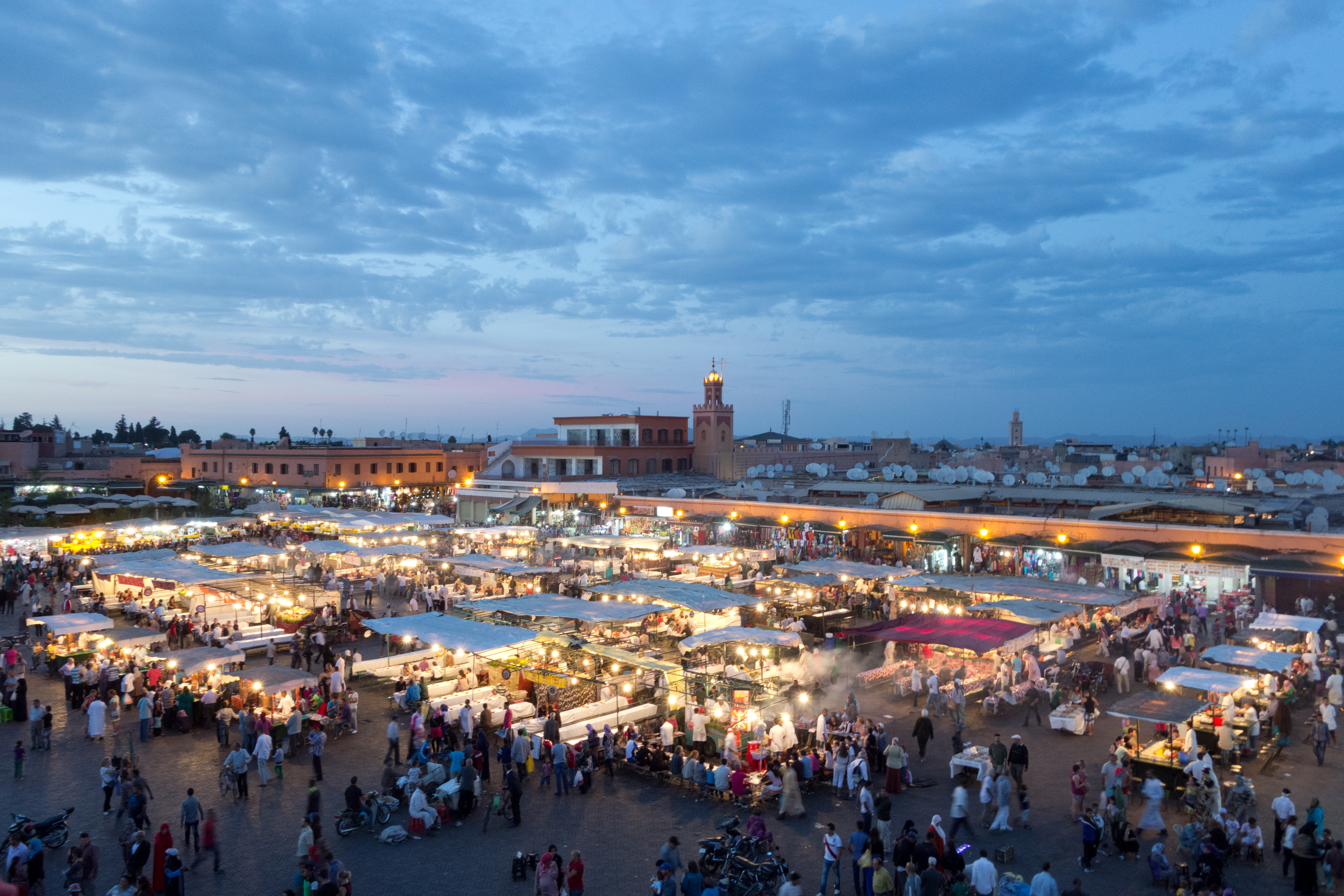
- Jemaa el-Fnaa in the evening
- Interactive map of Jemaa el-Fnaa
- Native name: جامع الفناء (Arabic); ⵊⴰⵎⵄ ⵍⴼⵏⴰ (Standard Moroccan Tamazight)
- Location: Marrakesh
- Coordinates: 31°37′33″N 7°59′22″W

Jemaa el-Fnaa (Arabic: ساحة جامع الفناء, romanized: Sāḥat Jāmiʿ al-Fanāʾ; Standard Moroccan Tamazight: ⵊⴰⵎⵄ ⵍⴼⵏⴰ, romanized: Jamɛ Lfna), also Jemaa el-Fna, Djema el-Fna or Djemaa el-Fnaa, is a square and market place in the medina quarter (old city) of Marrakesh, Morocco. It remains the main square of Marrakesh, used by locals and tourists.

== Name ==
The origin of its name is unclear: jāmiʿ means "congregation" or "mosque" in Arabic, probably referring to a destroyed mosque on the site. Fanāʾ can mean "death/extinction" or "a courtyard, space in front of a building". Fināʾ in Arabic commonly means "open area"; a straight translation would be "the gathering/congregation area". Meanings could thus be "The Assembly of Death/the Dead", referring to public executions on the plaza around 1050 CE; "The Mosque at the End of the World"; or a reference to a mosque with a distinctive courtyard or square in front of it.

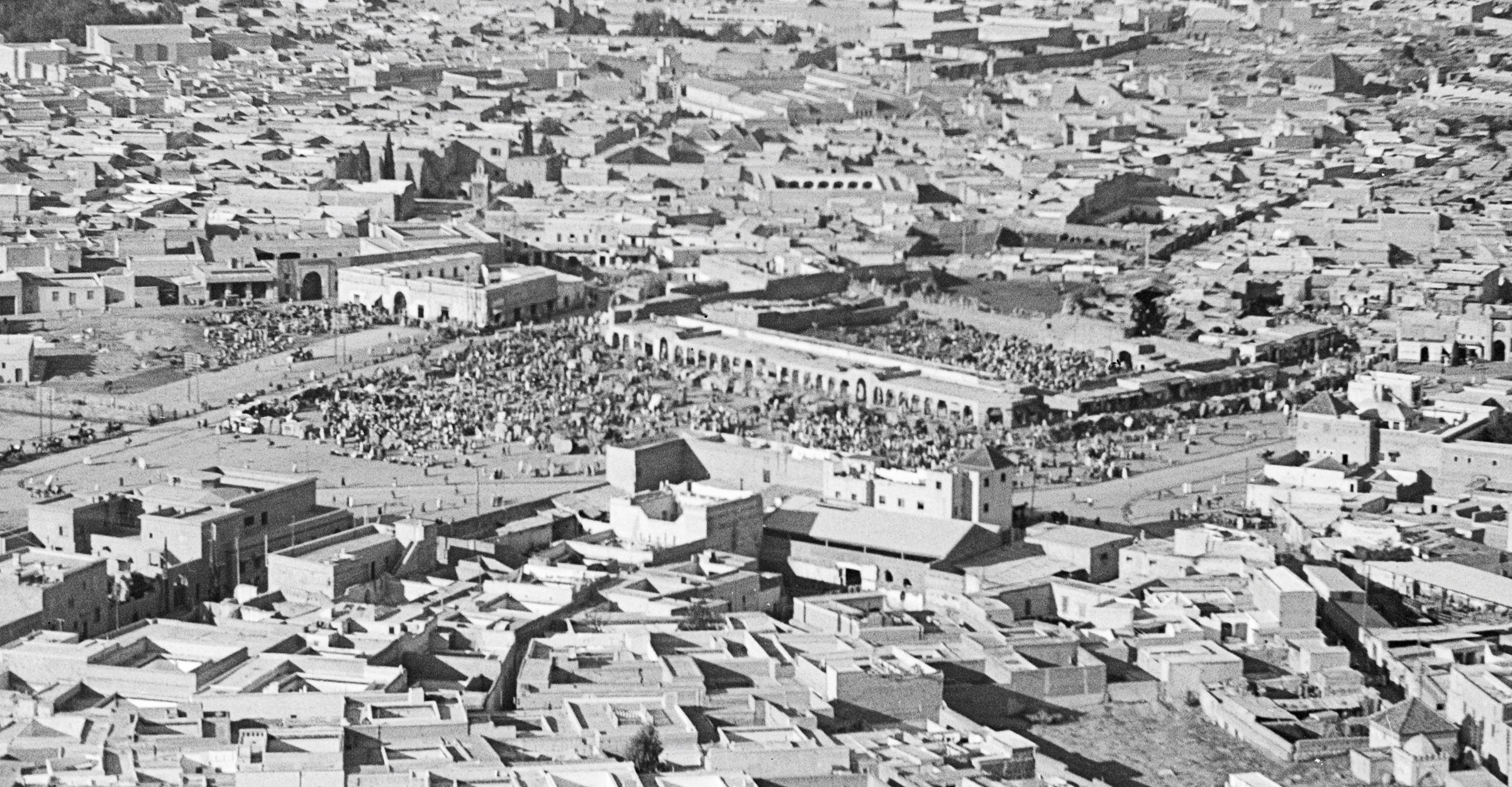
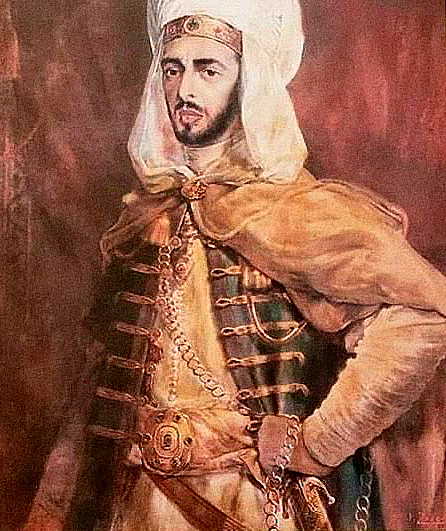
Aerial view of the Jemaa el-Fnaa in 1930–1931 (left); the large rectangular enclosure visible in the center right may be the ruins of the unfinished mosque instituted by Saadian Sultan Ahmad al-Mansur (right), which gave the square its present name

One specific explanation endorsed by historians comes from historical reports that the powerful Saadian sultan Ahmad al-Mansur (ruled 1578–1603) had embarked on the construction of a monumental Friday mosque in the middle of the square. However, due to a downturn in fortunes (probably outbreaks of the plague) the sultan was forced to abandon the project part-way through. The mosque thus remained unfinished and fell into ruins. The ruined outline of its walls was apparently still visible in the 19th century and corresponded roughly to the current site of the "Souk Jdid" (the "new souk" just north of the food-stalls). In this way, jāmiʿ al-fanāʾ ostensibly refers to the place of the "ruined mosque". The name Jāmiʿ al-Fanāʾ appears in historical records for the first time in the 17th-century chronicle of the West African historian Abderrahman as-Sa'idi. As-Sa'idi claimed that the intended name of al-Mansur's unfinished mosque was jamaa al-hna, meaning "Mosque of Tranquility", but that after its abandonment it came to be known, by popular irony, as the "Mosque of ruination/annihilation", or jāmiʿ al-fanāʾ (the word fanāʾ' in this case meaning a state of being extinguished or totally ruined).

== History ==
=== Early history: Almoravid and Almohad periods ===
Marrakesh was founded by the Almoravid dynasty in 1070 by Abu Bakr ibn Umar and subsequently developed by his successors. Initially, the city's two main monuments and focal points were the fortress known as Ksar el-Hajjar ("fortress of stone") and the city's first Friday mosque (the site of the future Ben Youssef Mosque). The Ksar el-Hajjar was located directly north of today's Kutubiyya Mosque. The major souk (market) streets of the city thus developed along the roads linking these two important sites and still correspond to the main axis of souks today. At one end of this axis, next to the Ksar el-Hajjar, a large open space existed for temporary and weekly markets. This space was initially known as Rahbat al-Ksar ("the place of the fortress"). Other historical records refer to it as as-Saha al-Kubra ("the grand square"), or simply as as-Saha or ar-Rahba.

The Almoravid emir Ali ibn Yusuf (ruled 1106–1143) soon afterwards constructed a palace directly south of and adjacent to the Ksar el-Hajjar, on the actual site of the later Kutubiyya Mosque. One part of this palace was a monumental stone gate on its east side which faced towards the Rahbat al-Ksar. The gate likely played a symbolic role: it was the entrance to the palace for those seeking an audience with the sovereign, and it's possible the ruler himself would sit, enthroned, before the gate and publicly dispense justice on a weekly basis (a tradition which existed among other Moroccan and Andalusian ruling dynasties). The importance of the great public square in front of the royal palace thus led it to become the place for public executions, military parades, festivals, and other public events until long afterwards.

After a destructive struggle, Marrakech fell to the Almohads in 1147, who undertook many construction projects throughout the city. This included construction of the nearby Kutubiyya Mosque, begun in 1147, which was meant to replace the Almoravid-built Ben Youssef Mosque as the city's main mosque. Notably, a new royal kasbah (citadel) was erected further south by Ya'qub al-Mansur after 1184. As the Almohad rulers moved to the new kasbah, the old Almoravid palace and fortress fell out of use and was eventually torn down (in part to make way for the new Kutubiyya Mosque). Subsequently, with the fortunes of the city, the Jemaa el-Fna saw periods of decline and also renewal.

=== Later history: Saadian period to modern times ===
Despite the encroachment of new constructions on the edge of the square over time, it never disappeared due to its role as an open market area and as the site of public events. One attempt to fill a large part of the square is reported to have been made by the Saadian sultan Ahmad al-Mansur who attempted to build a monumental mosque in the square. The mosque would have likely followed the same model as the Bab Doukkala and Mouassine Mosques, being deliberately built in the midst of major traffic routes in the city, and would have been accompanied by a number of attendant civic and religious buildings. The mosque was never finished, however, possibly due to disasters like the plague epidemics during al-Mansur's reign. Construction was abandoned part-way through and what had been built fell into ruin and was taken over by market stalls and other occupants. (It is probably also the site of a modern shop complex, Souk Jdid, just north of the food-stalls today, whose outline has the same compass orientation as the mosques of al-Mansur's time.) This ruined mosque may have given the square its current name, Jemaa el-Fna ("Mosque of Ruins").

On January 24, 1864, a massive explosion took place in the area of the square, reportedly caused by the criminal negligence of certain officials trying to avoid a government inspection. A fire in a funduq (commercial warehouse) ignited 500 quintals of gunpowder which were dangerously stored there. The explosion damaged houses and shops in a wide radius and resulted in some 300 deaths.

The square continued to serve as a meeting place at the heart of the city despite having no formal architectural delineation. In addition to its old role as a place of public executions, it was also the site of a traditional Friday market, a stage for the performance of fantasias, and the setting of public entertainment in the evenings (much as today). In 1922 the government (under French administration at the time), passed the first laws aimed at protecting and preserving the square's cultural space and heritage. In 2001 the square was proclaimed an Intangible Cultural Heritage by UNESCO, and in 2008 it was included in UNESCO's List of Intangible Cultural Heritage of Humanity.

Beginning in May 2025, the square underwent a major renovation program scheduled for completion by the end of the year. With a budget of 160 million dirhams (approximately US$17.7 million), the project was designed to upgrade infrastructure, enhance accessibility, and reorganize public and commercial spaces while safeguarding the square’'s historic and cultural significance.

== The Square ==
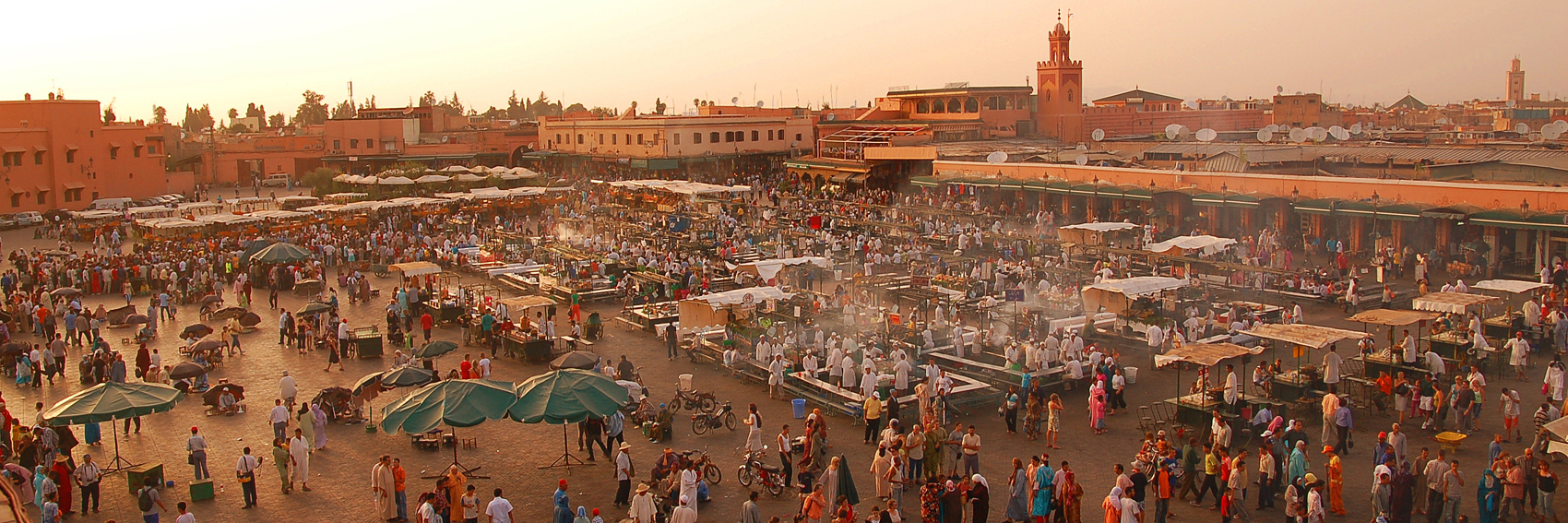
Panoramic view of Jemaa el-Fnaa

During the day it is predominantly occupied by orange juice stalls, water sellers with traditional leather water-bags and brass cups, youths with chained macaques and snake charmers despite the protected status of these species under Moroccan law.

As the day progresses, the entertainment on offer changes: the snake charmers depart, and late in the day the square becomes more crowded, with dancing-boys (it would be against custom for girls to provide such entertainment), story-tellers (telling their tales to an audience of locals), magicians, and peddlers of traditional medicines. As darkness falls, the square fills with dozens of food-stalls as the number of people on the square peaks.

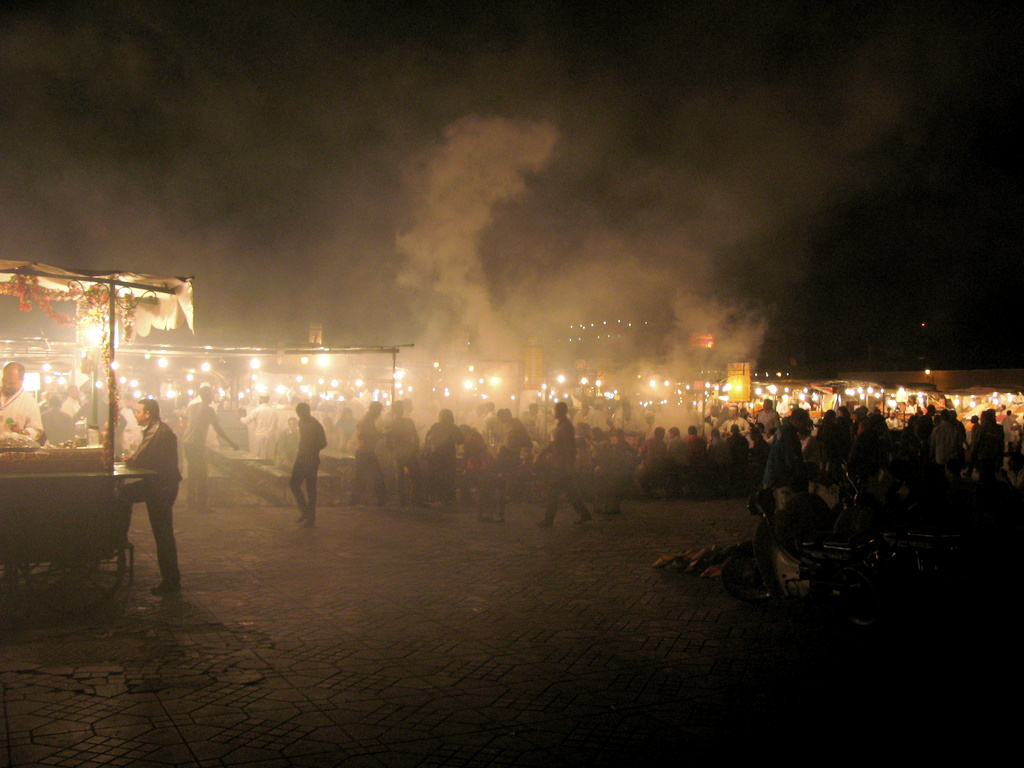
Smoke rising from food stalls

The square is edged along one side by the Marrakesh souk, a traditional Maghreb market catering both for the common daily needs of the locals, and for the tourist trade. On other sides are hotels and gardens and café terraces, and narrow streets lead into the alleys of the medina quarter.

The square fulfills an important function for storytellers, and those cultural expressions have drawn worldwide attention. German filmmaker Thomas Ladenburger made a 90-minute documentary on the storytellers, and its importance for tourism received academic attention as well.

== UNESCO Masterpiece of the Oral and Intangible Heritage of Humanity ==
The idea of the UNESCO project Masterpieces of the Oral and Intangible Heritage of Humanity came from people concerned about the Jamaa el Fna. The place is known for its active concentration of traditional activities by storytellers, musicians and performers, but it was threatened by economic development pressures. In fighting for the protection of traditions, the residents called for action on an international level to recognize the need for the protection of such places — termed "cultural spaces" — and other popular and traditional forms of cultural expression.

UNESCO encourages communities to identify, document, protect, promote and revitalize such heritage. The UNESCO label aims to raise awareness about the importance of oral and intangible heritage as an essential component of cultural diversity.

The spectacle of Jamaa el Fna is repeated daily and each day it is different. Everything changes — voices, sounds, gestures, the public which sees, listens, smells, tastes, touches. The oral tradition is framed by one much vaster — that we can call intangible. The Square, as a physical space, shelters a rich oral and intangible tradition.

— Juan Goytisolo, in a speech delivered at the opening meeting for the First Proclamation, 15 May 2001

== 2011 bombing ==
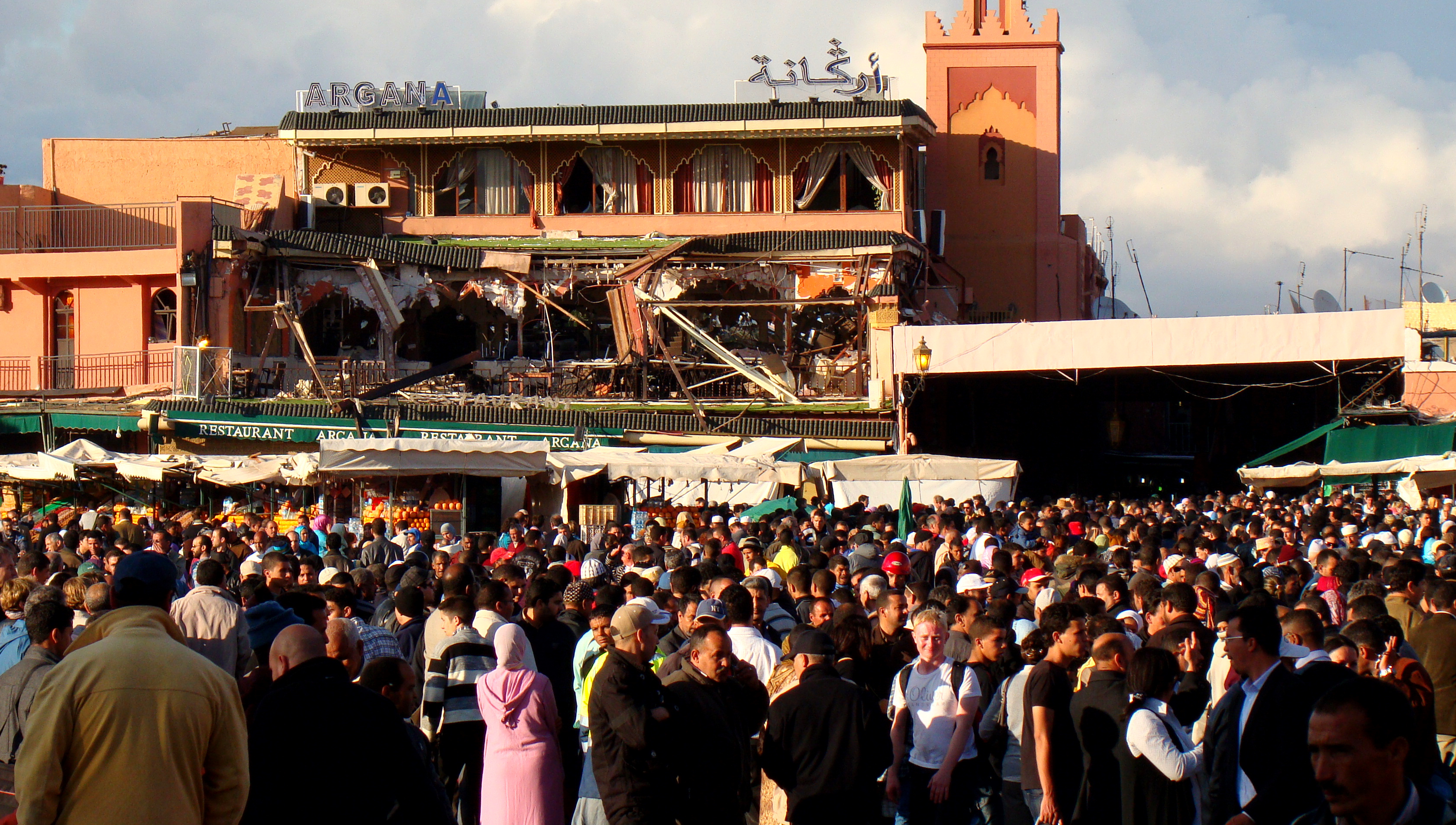
Café Argana the day after bombing

Shortly before noon on April 28, 2011, a blast originating in a café in the square killed 17 people and injured another 25. Initial reports blamed an accidental gas explosion, but officials later blamed "criminals" and "terrorists".

== 2023 earthquake ==
An earthquake with a 6.8 magnitude that struck Morocco in the evening of Friday the 8th of September 2023 highly damaged the Kharbouch Mosque and collapsed its minaret, which overlooked the square. In the days after the earthquake, local residents took to sleeping outside in the square to avoid the potential impact of aftershocks causing more buildings to collapse.
