= Tan-Tan Moussem =

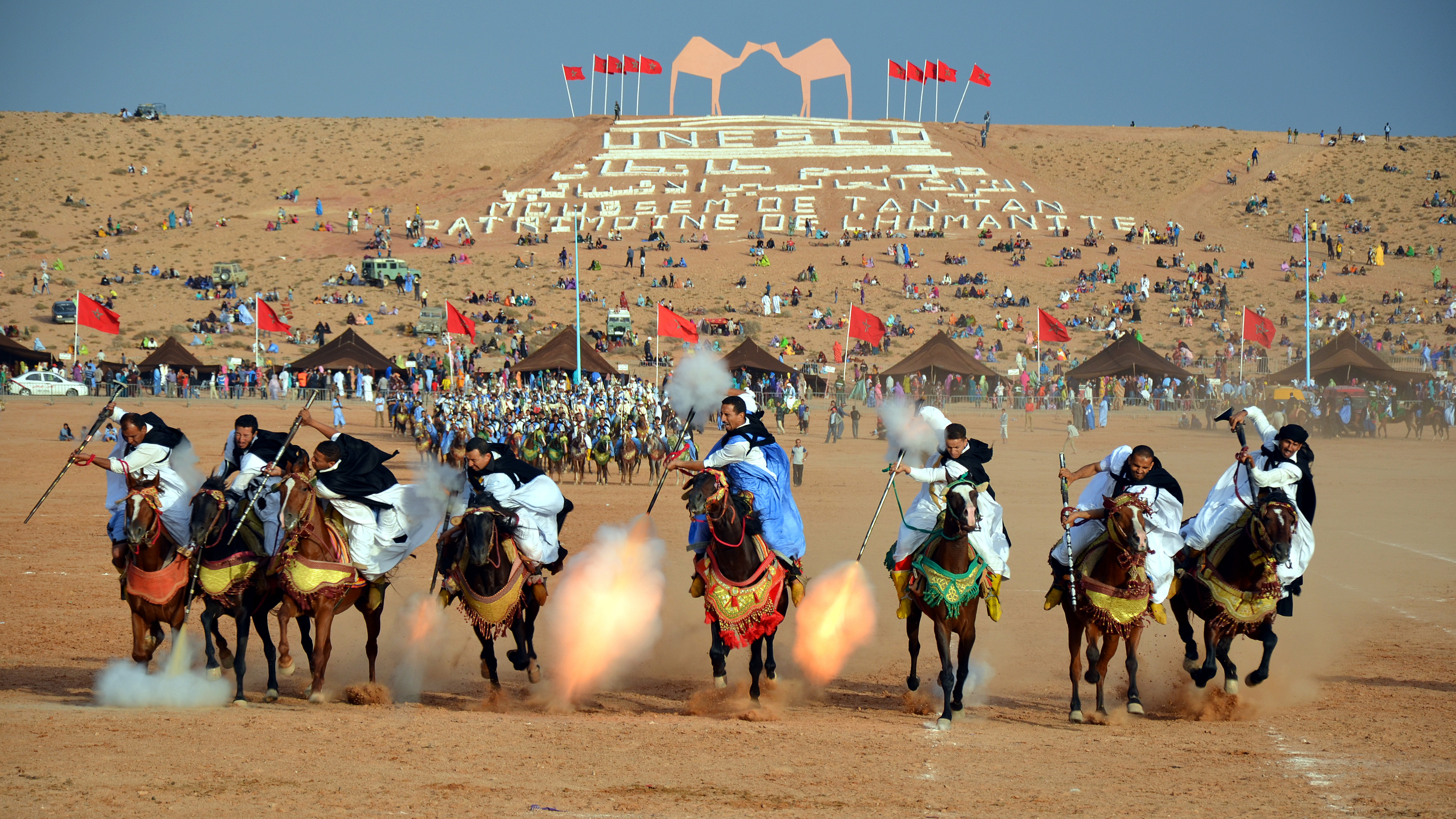
- Sahrawi tribal men performing fantasia (2013)
- Genre: Fair
- Frequency: Annual
- Locations: Tan-Tan, Morocco
- Inaugurated: 1963

Moussem of Tan-Tan
- UNESCO Intangible Cultural Heritage
- Country: Morocco
- Reference: 00168
- Region: Arab States

Inscription history
- Inscription: 2008 (3rd session)
- List: Representative

The Tan-Tan Moussem is an annual gathering held since 1963 by more than thirty tribes from southern Morocco and other parts of Northwest Africa in Tan-Tan, a town in south-western Morocco. In traditional Berber culture, a moussem is "a type of annual fair with economic, cultural and social functions."

This particular gathering was first held in 1963 to "promote local traditions and provide a place for exchange, meeting and celebration". It is said to have been associated with Mohamed Laghdaf, a Saharan leader who fought the French and Spanish colonizers for decades, died in 1960, and was buried near Tan-Tan. The gathering was banned by the authorities in 1979 due to security concerns, but was revived again in 2004 with the help of UNESCO and the Moroccan Ministry of Tourism. Originally it was held in May, but is currently held every December. In 2008, it was included in the list of intangible cultural heritage in Morocco as a Masterpieces of the Oral and Intangible Heritage of Humanity.

Nomadic tribes travel to the moussem from all over the Sahara, making it the largest gathering of nomadic tribes in northern Africa. Around 800 tents are set up to accommodate them, with some used for special exhibits on traditional Berber tribal life.

A wide variety of activities happen at the gathering. It is "an opportunity for tribes to socialize with song and dance, swap stories, share herbal remedy knowledge, compete in horse races and engage in some serious camel trading" and "buy, sell and exchange foodstuffs and other products, organize camel and horse-breeding competitions, celebrate weddings." Further, the festival includes "a range of cultural expressions such as musical performances, popular chanting, games, poetry contests and other Hassanie oral traditions." This moussem also includes the fantasia, a choreographed reenactment of a cavalry charge by Berber tribesmen who raise their rifles to the air and issue a warcry.
