= Ahidus =

Berber style of collective performance in Morocco

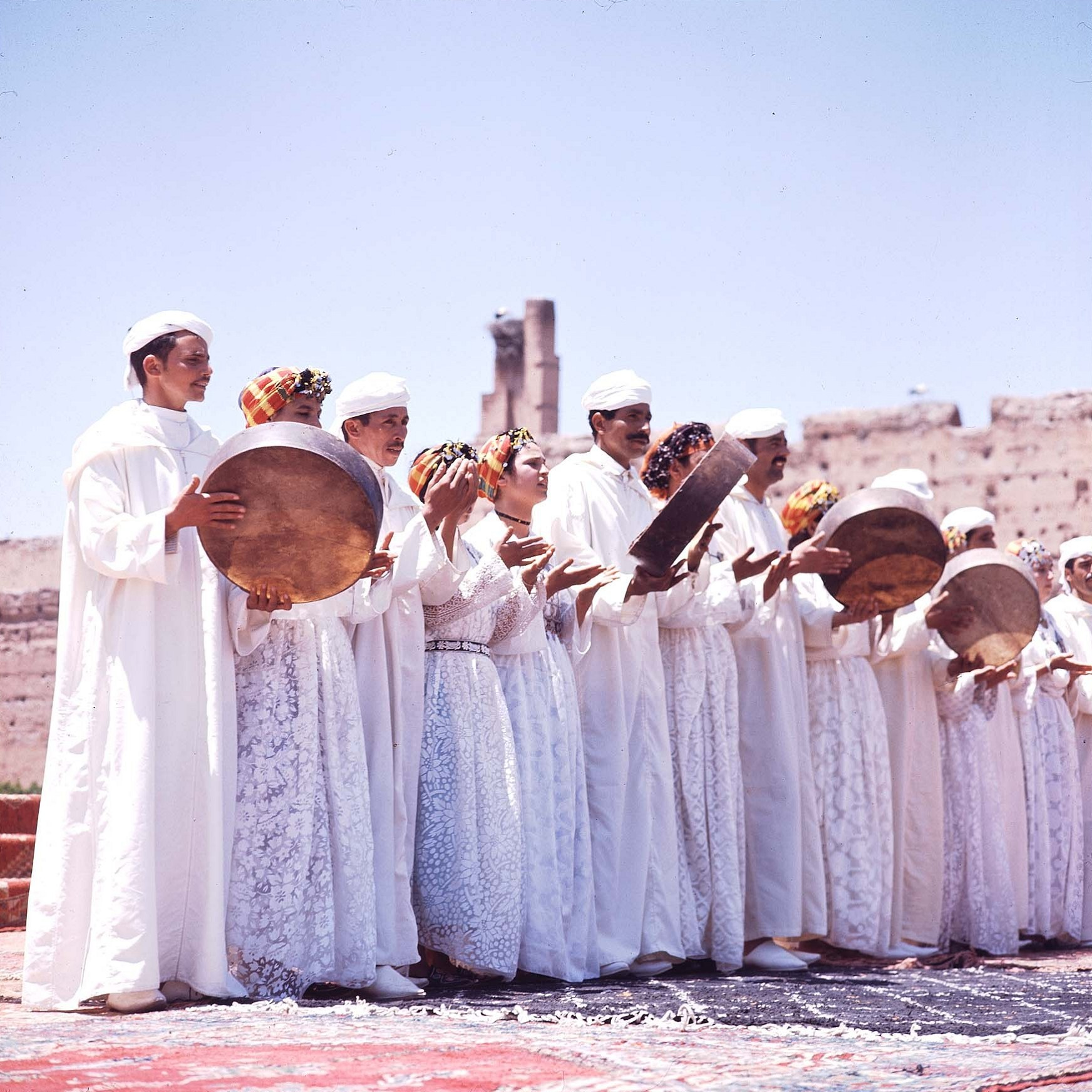
- Native name: Central Atlas Tamazight: ⴰⵃⵉⴷⵓⵙ
- Stylistic origins: Berber music
- Cultural origins: Central Morocco
- Typical instruments: Drums

Regional scenes
- Middle and Eastern High Atlas

Ahidus group performing during Wikicamp 2023 in Ifrane, Morocco.

Ahidus (Central Atlas Tamazight: ⴰⵃⵉⴷⵓⵙ, romanized: aḥidous), also sometimes called ahidous, haidous, tahidoust or hidoussi, is a Berber style of collective performance in central Morocco. It is the traditional dance in many Berber tribes and is known to be the favorite entertainment of these tribes.

The southern counterpart is known as Ahwash, while the northern counterpart is Aarfa.

== Description ==
The traditional Ahidus performance includes songs, dances and impromptu poetry performed by a group of performers standing shoulder to shoulder along with other men and women. They all form either a large circle or two facing lines. The man who accompanies and directs the dancer, called the leader of the dance or Ammehreb in Berber, stands in the center of the formation and adjust the rhythm.

== Origins and characteristics ==
The origins of Ahidus are not very known because of the lack of extensive research studies and investigations. However, Ahidus is believed to find its origin in the Berber tribe of Zenata.

The initial formation of the dance was done by making a closed circle which indicated the unity between the performers in particular and the inhabitants of the tribe in general. The leader of the dance would stand in the middle and lead the group.

An important aspect of Ahidus which did not change through the years is the traditional uniform. For men, it mostly is a white djellaba and a turban as symbols of peace. As for women, they were free to wear either white or colourful kaftans coupled with silver jewellery.

Ahidus dances are considered an expression of victory after a conflict or war.

== Gallery ==
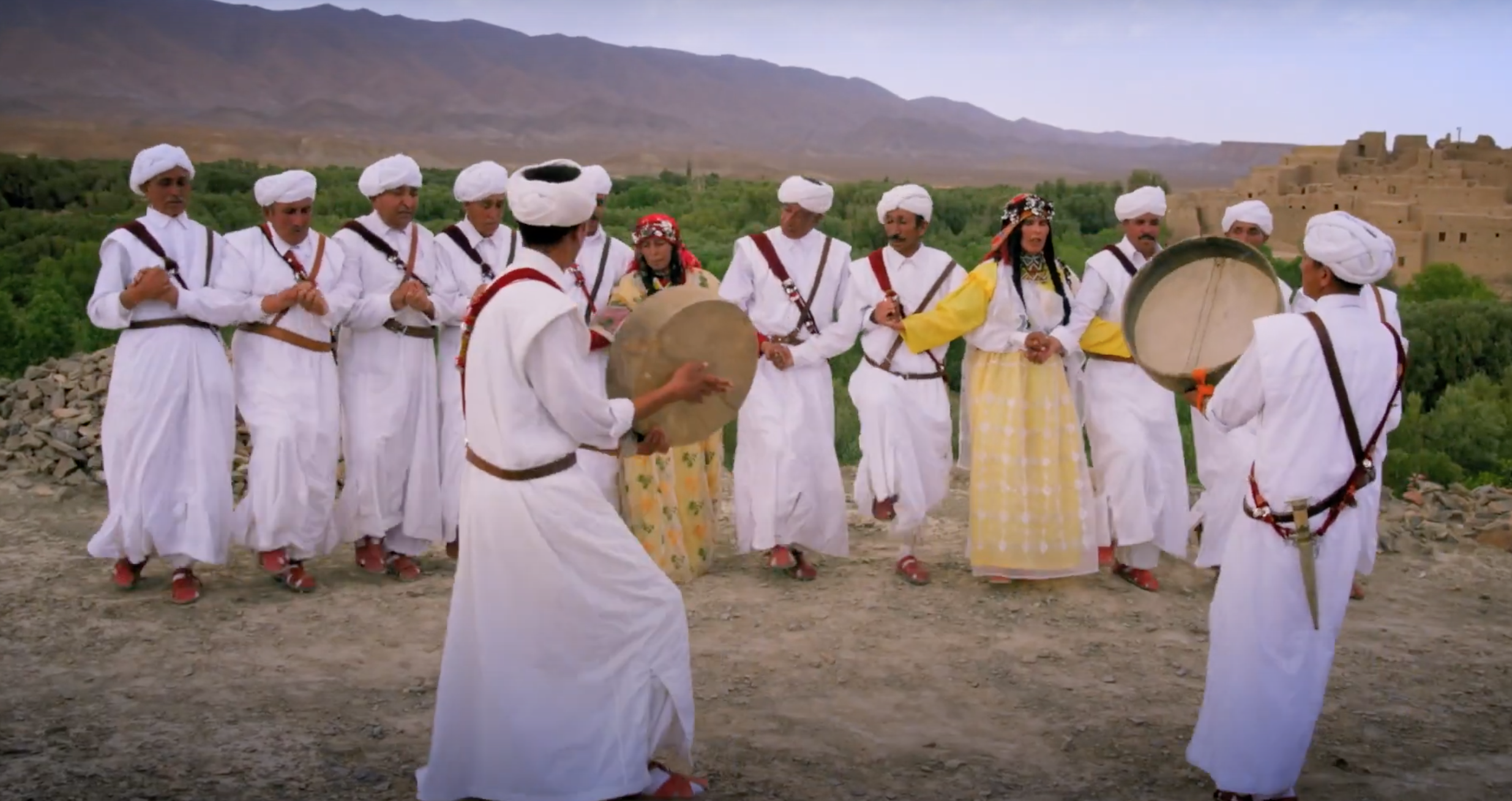
From Talsint

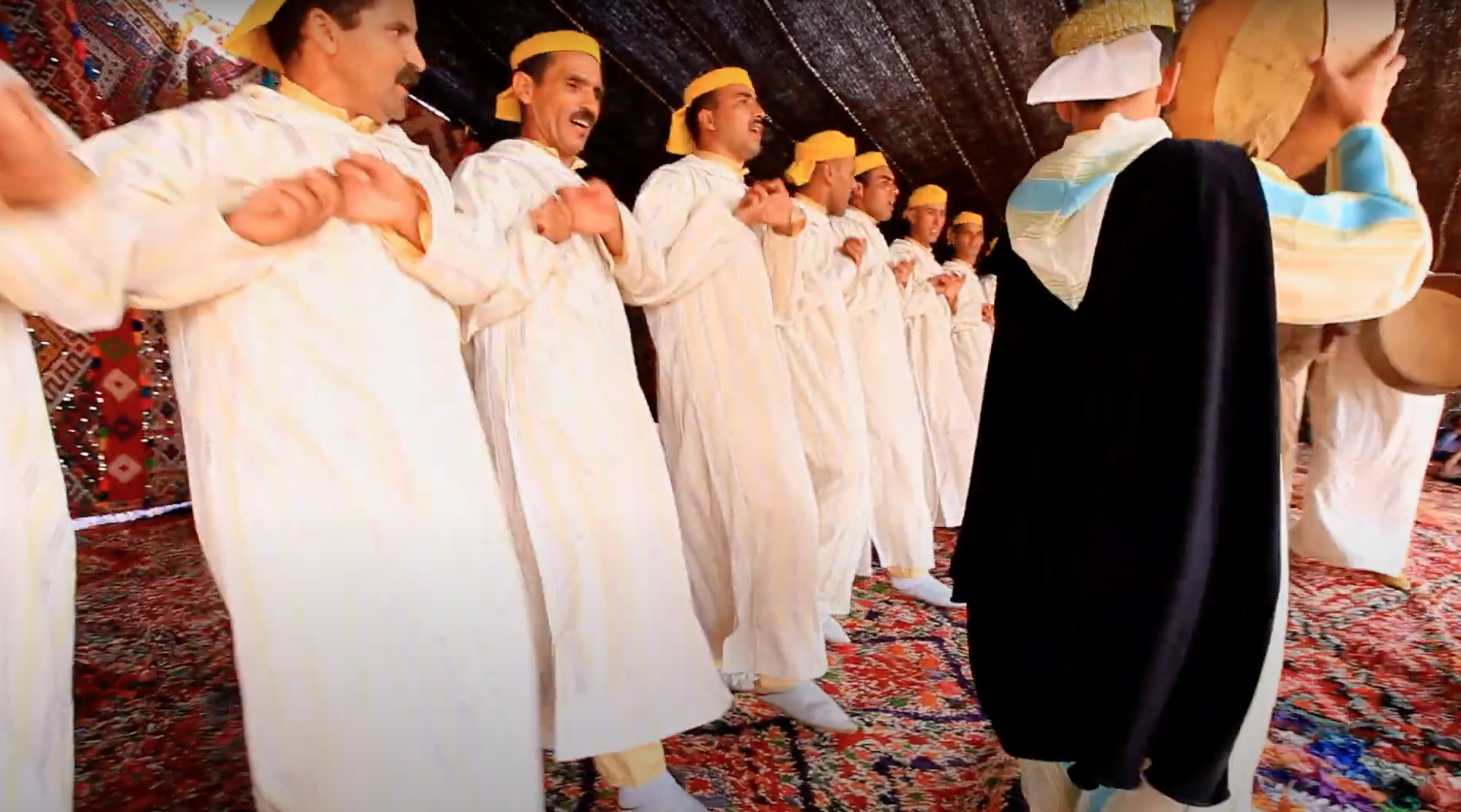
From Sefrou

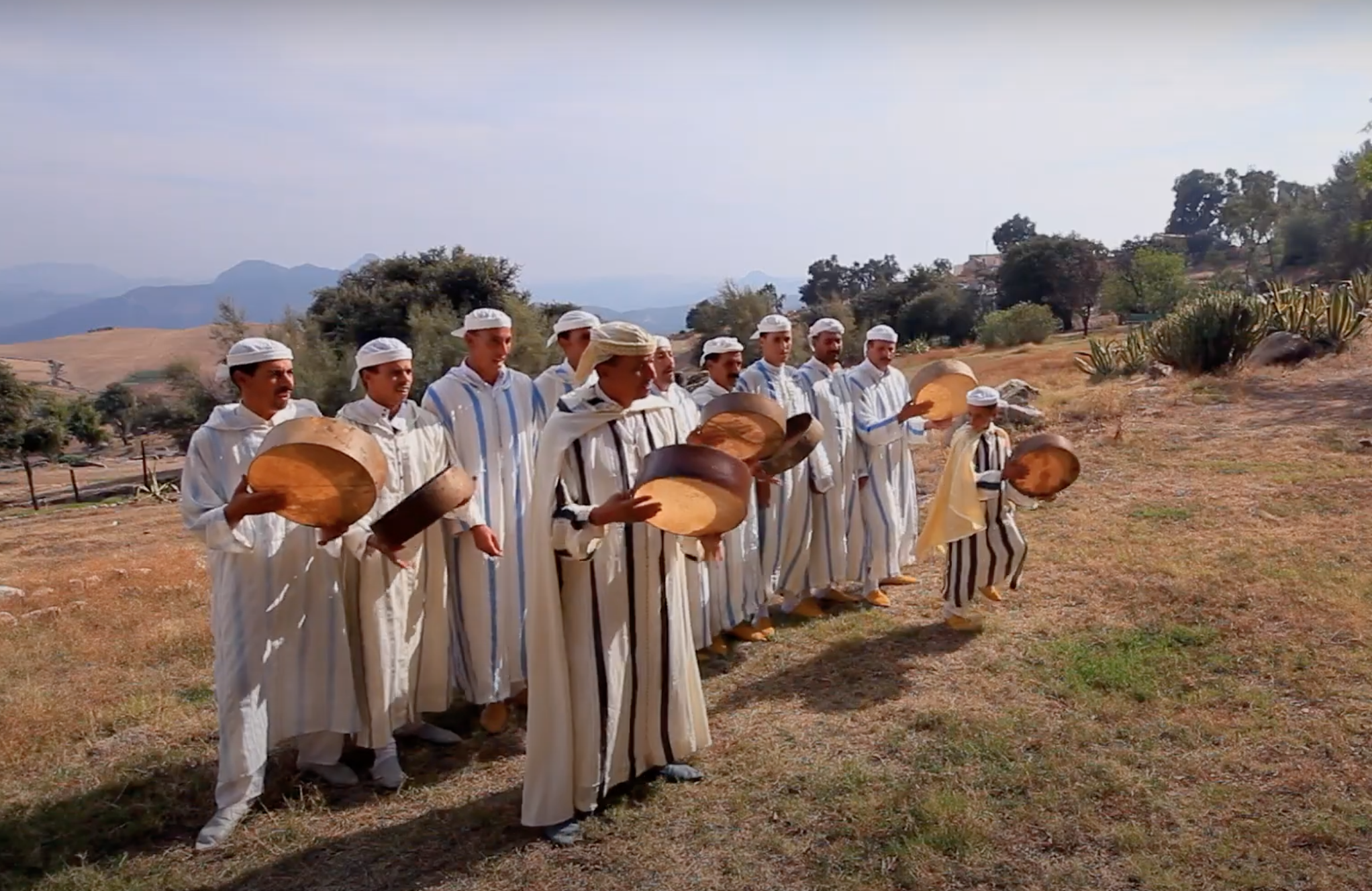
From Oulmes

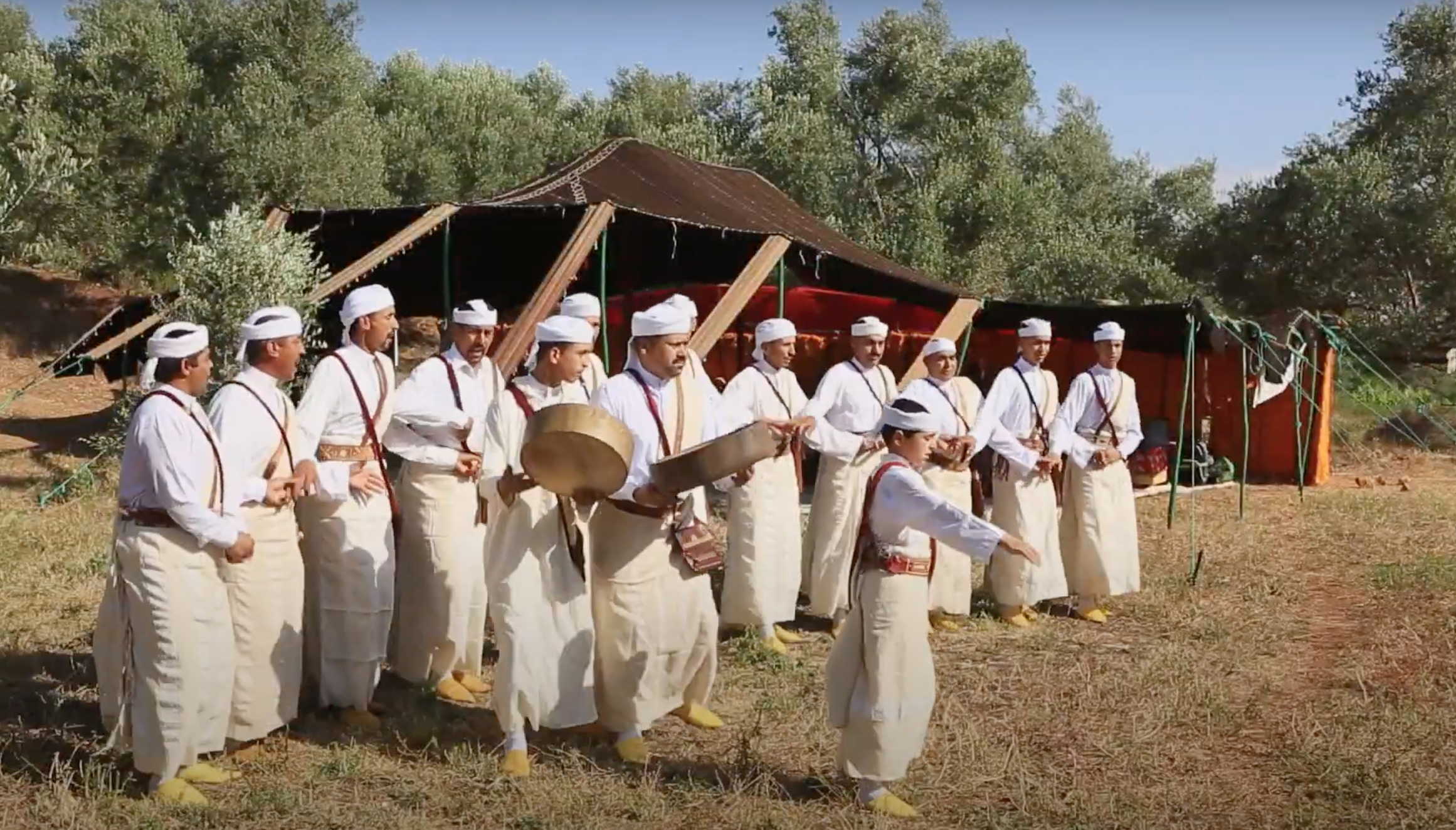
From Ain Fendel

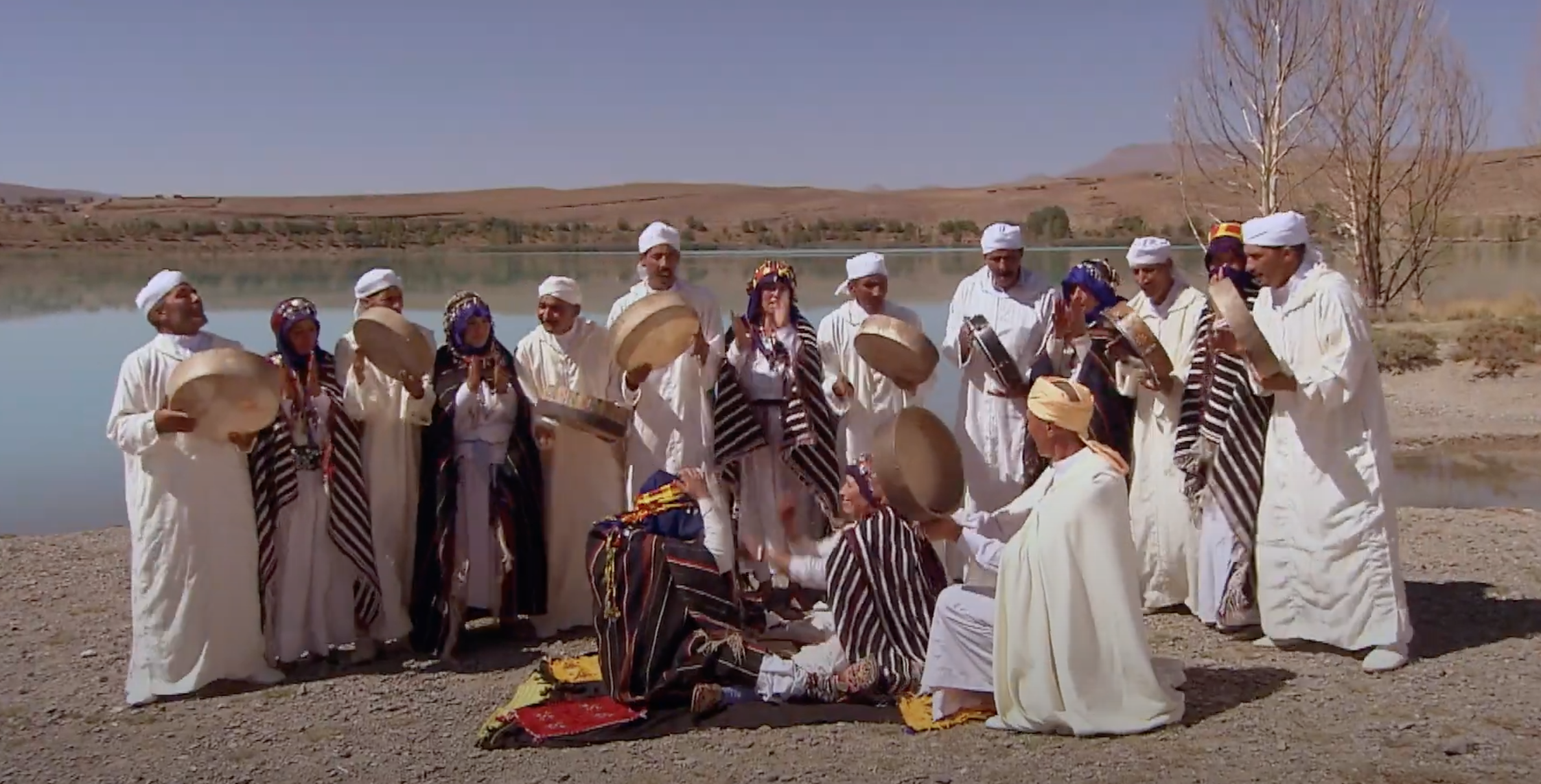
From Ait Hdidou in Imlchil

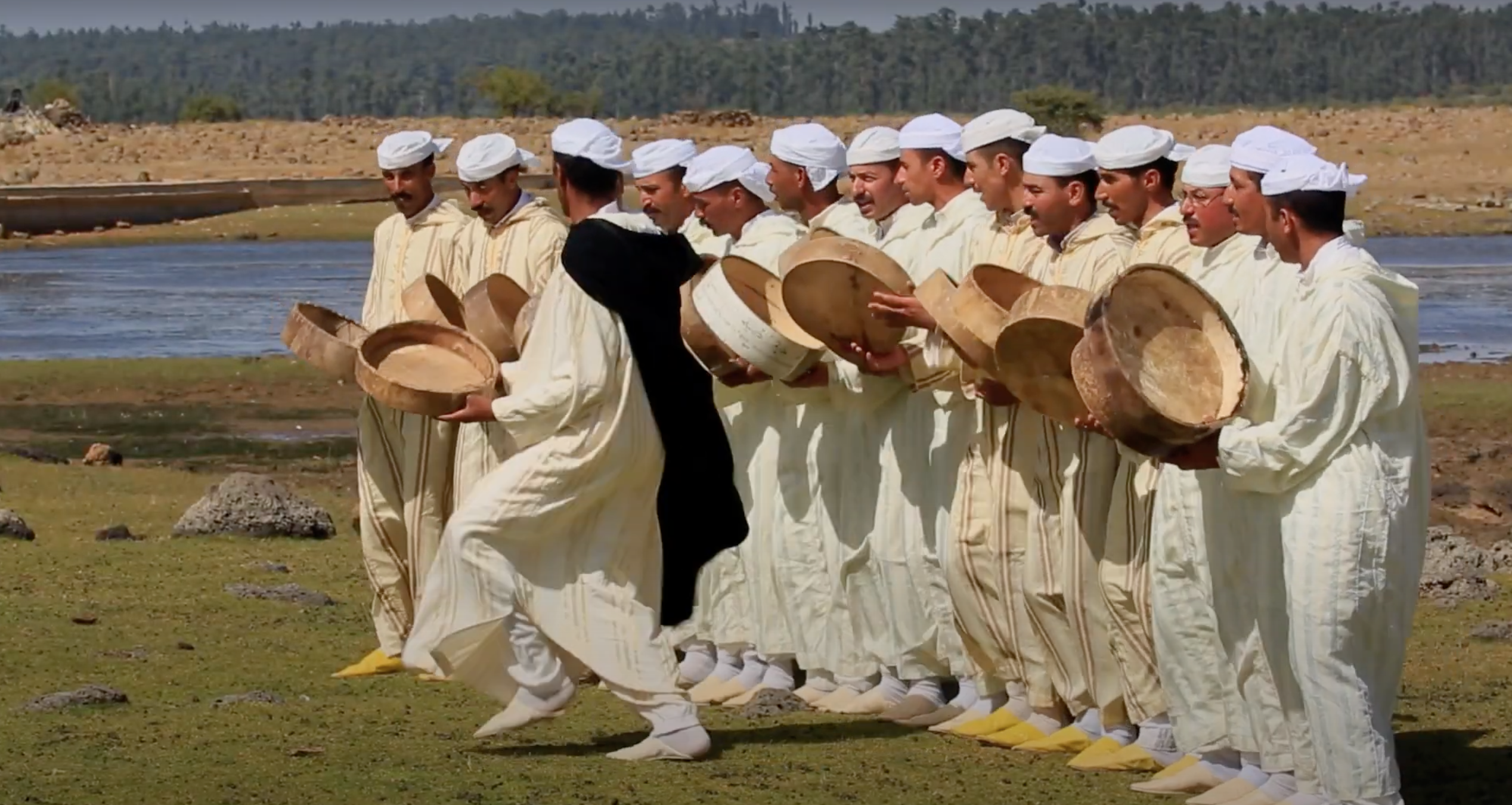
From Ain Leuh

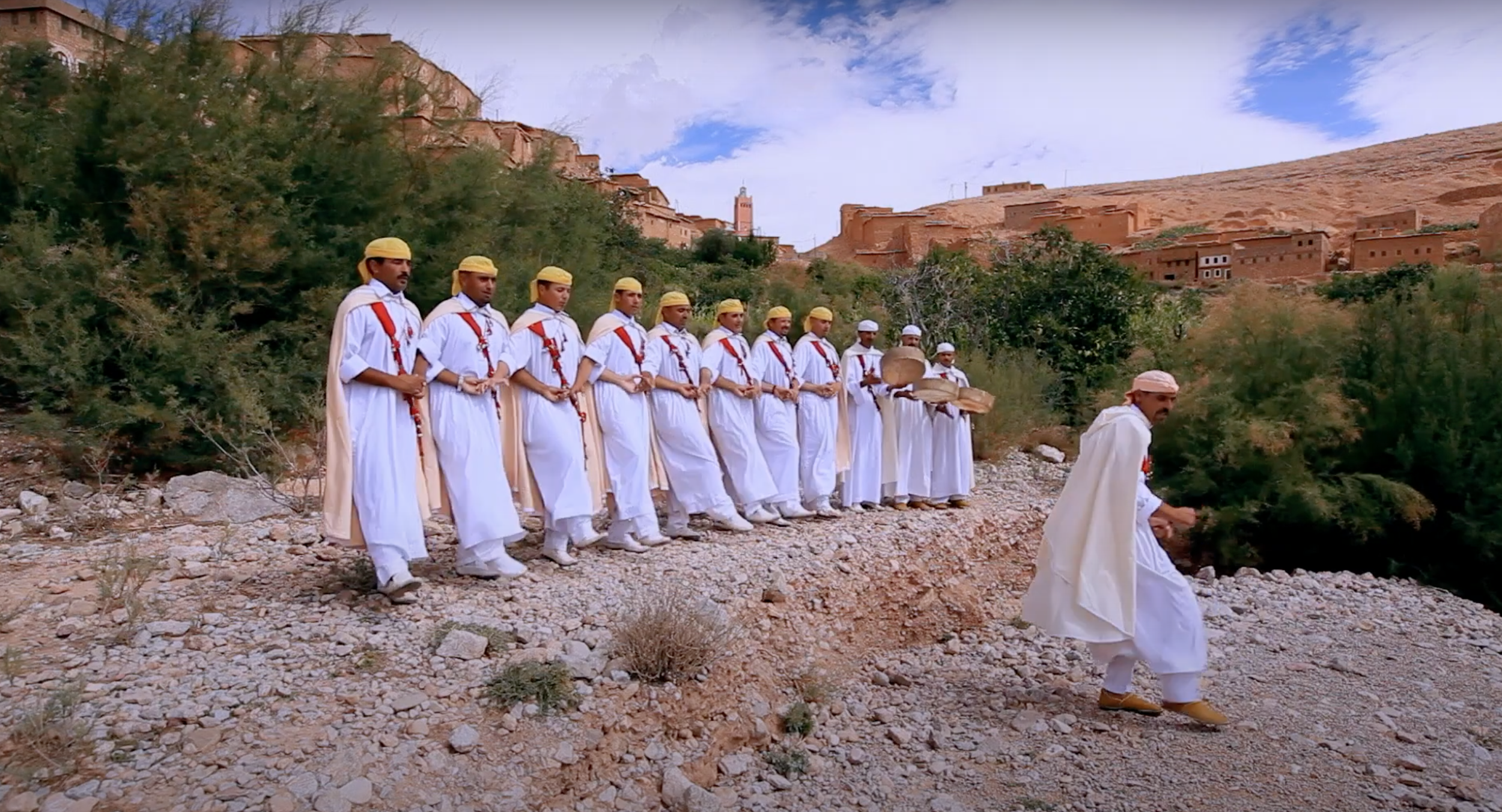
From Tsiwant

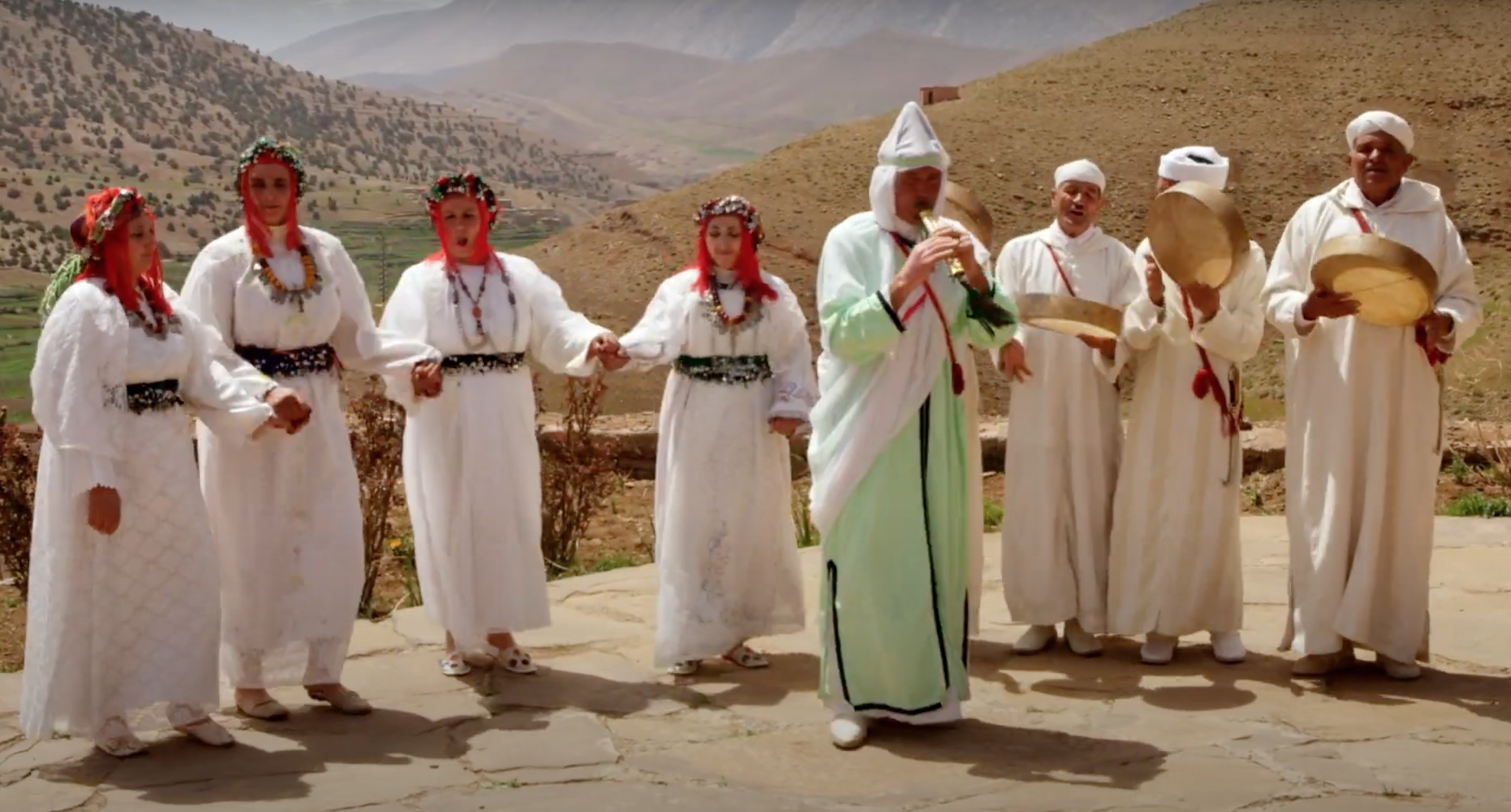
From Ait Bouguemez

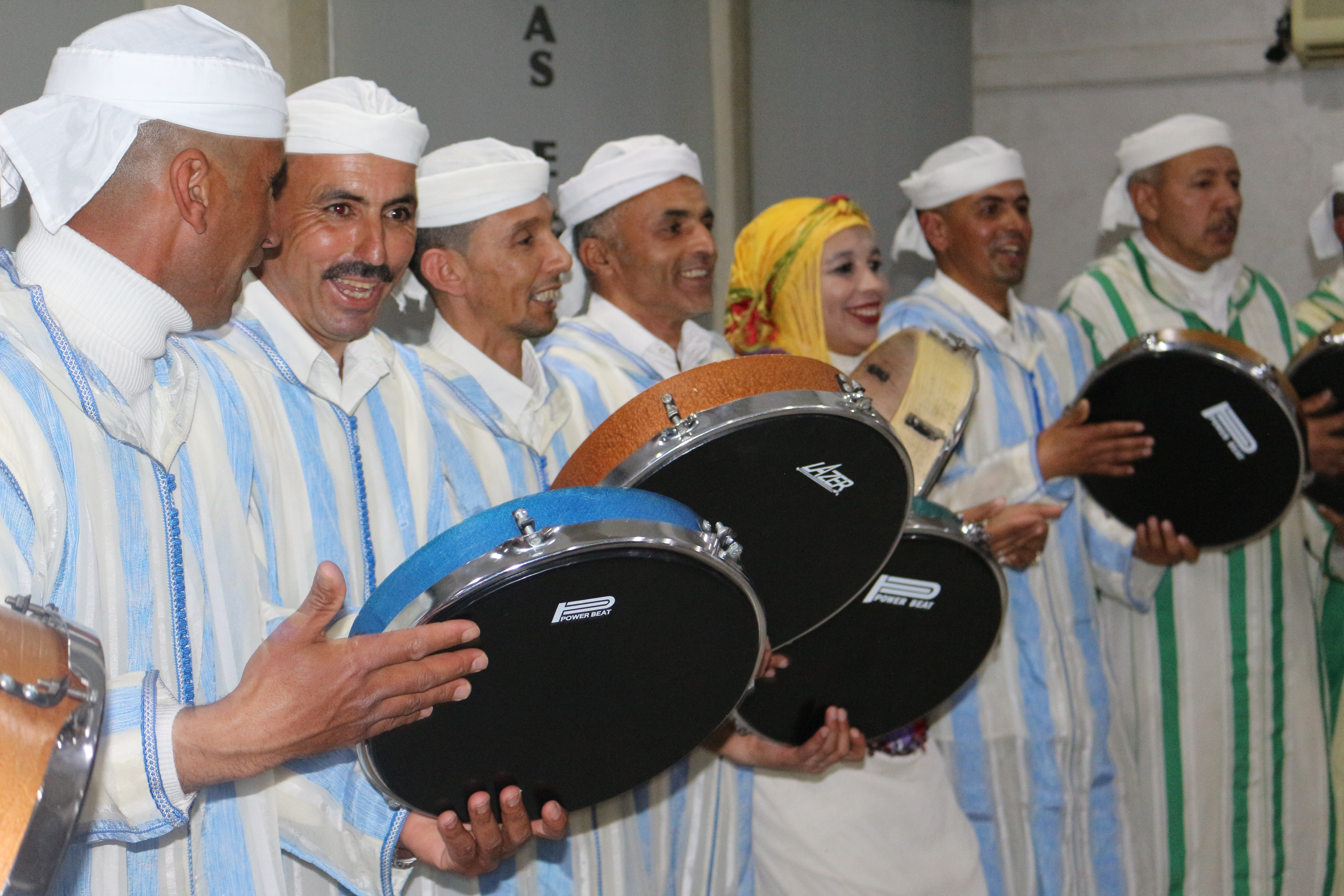
From Ifrane
