= Taskiwin =

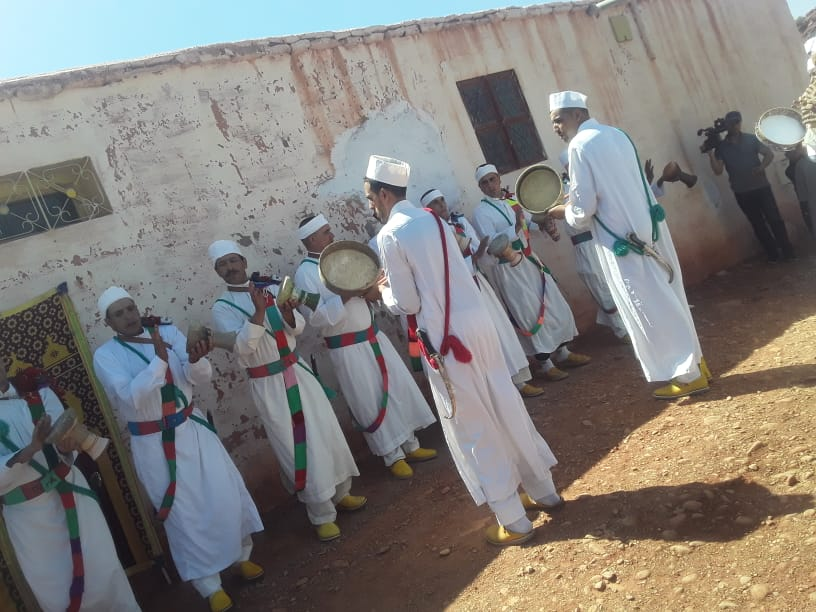
- Taskiwin dancers in Irohalen village
- Native name: ⵜⴰⵙⴽⵉⵡⵉⵏ / تاسكيوين
- Genre: Folk dance
- Origin: High Atlas, Morocco

Taskiwin, martial dance of the western High Atlas
- UNESCO Intangible Cultural Heritage
- Country: Morocco
- Reference: 01256
- Region: Arab States

Inscription history
- Inscription: 2017 (12th session)
- List: Need of Urgent Safeguarding

Taskiwin (Berber languages: ⵜⴰⵙⴽⵉⵡⵉⵏ, Arabic: تاسكيوين) is a traditional dance of Morocco that is recognized by UNESCO as Intangible Cultural Heritage. It is a martial dance that is specific to the western High Atlas mountain range in central Morocco. The dance gets its name from the richly decorated horn each dancer carries, known as the Tiskt. The dance involves the art of shaking one's shoulders to the rhythm of tambourines and flutes, and stomping the feet. The practice is said to foster social cohesion and harmony and provide a sense of identity and continuity for the communities that perform it.

Taskiwin is one among many traditional group dance styles of Morocco. It's also considered a subgenre of Ahwash.

== History and Origin ==
It is believed to have originated in the High Atlas Mountains, where it was performed by the Amazigh people, also known as the Berbers. The dance was traditionally performed by men, who would carry a decorated horn called the Tiskt while dancing. The Tiskt is an important part of the dance, as it is used to create a rhythmic beat that accompanies the movements of the dancers. The dance was originally performed as a martial art, and was used by the Amazigh people as a way to train for battle, as well as to celebrate victories in battle.

== Instruments ==
Taskiwin involves several musical instruments such as:

- Agwal: a small clay barrel or goblet-shaped drum
- Tal'wwatt: a flute
- Tallunt: a frame drum
- Tiskt: a powderhorn, after which the dance was named, with a small bell attached to it. The term "tiskt" in Berber language simply means "horn", and its plural form is "taskiwin".

== Current status ==
Due to denigration of traditions by young people today, Taskiwin is in danger of extinction, with only a few villages still practicing it, and practitioners often not finding aspiring successors. Since 1993, several local associations were created in an attempt to preserve this tradition.
