= Ahwash =

Shilha style of collective performance

Aḥwash
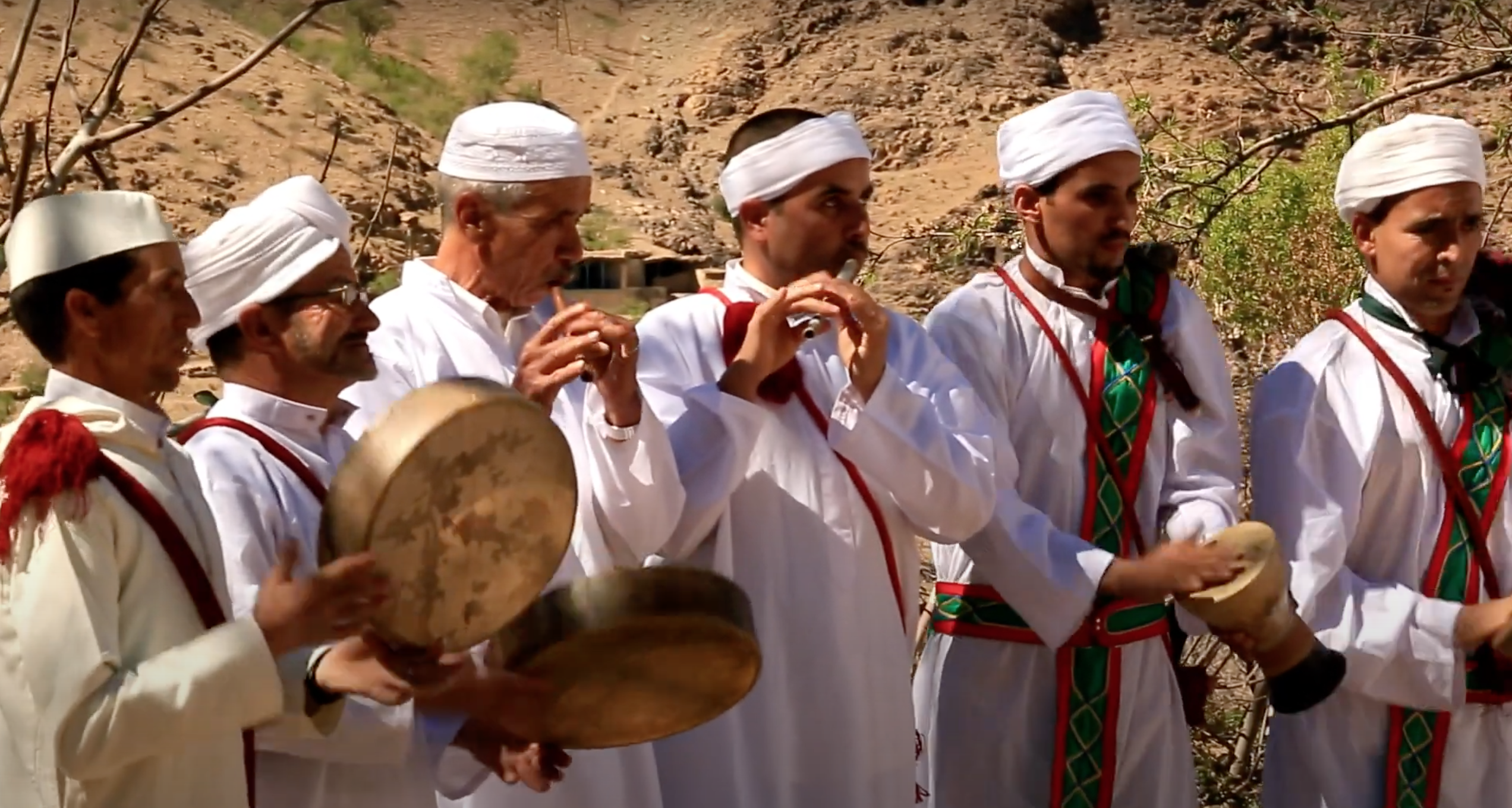
- Musicians playing ahwash in Tajelt
- Native name: Tachelhit: ⴰⵃⵡⴰⵛ
- Stylistic origins: Berber music
- Cultural origins: Southern Morocco
- Typical instruments: drums

Subgenres
- Taskiwin, Ahwash n tferkhin, Leammt

Regional scenes
- Morocco - Ouarzazate - Sous - High Atlas

Aḥwash (Tachelhit: ⴰⵃⵡⴰⵛ, IPA /æħwæʃ/, also Romanized as ahwach or ahouach), is a Shilha style of collective performance, including dance, singing, poetry and percussion, from southern Morocco. The ahwash is performed on the occasion of local festivals as a celebration of the community.

The central atlas counterpart is known as Ahidus, while the northern counterpart is Aarfa.

== Description ==
The ahwash is usually performed by two large groups of people, typically men and women on opposite sides, who alternate their performances of song, dance, poetry, and drumming on frame drums. The ahwash is rarely performed outside of individual villages, because of the difficulty of transporting the large number of participants (often more than twenty, and sometimes 150 or more). As a result, the ahwash has developed somewhat independently among different villages, and the details of the performances differ.

== Etymology ==
- Ahwach is one of the Amazigh arts of singing and collective performance dance in Morocco.
- The word "Haouch" in Tachelhit means singing, and the term "Ahwach" is used to refer to all forms of collective dance among the Amazigh tribes in the Atlas Mountains regions

== Cultural Significance ==
Ahwach is a fundamental element of Amazigh identity and plays a crucial role in preserving Amazigh culture and traditions. This tradition is transmitted orally and through practice, from generation to generation.

It can celebrate important events such as weddings, births, and harvests, or serve as a means of communication and social expression. The trance and ecstasy experienced during the dance allow participants to connect with their spirituality and community.

In a purely oral Amazigh culture, Ahwach represents a way of expressing and transmitting the experiences of both the individual and the tribe as a whole. Rich in connotations specific to its culture, this artistic tradition brings to life the ancient times of Amazigh communities.

== History ==
Ahwash may have come from Telouet, though historians have struggled to conclusively determine its origins, because of the lack of written history. Some believe the dance migrated along with the tribes and villages in the area. The dance is now found throughout the High Atlas and Sous regions.

== Religion and spirituality ==
The ahwash is recognized by many Moroccans to involve some pre-Islamic components of traditional Berber religion. While the poetry may make reference to Islamic traditions, the communal form of dancing and singing, involving members of the community of both sexes, stands in contrast to conservative Islamic views. In most places, an ahwash is performed in front of a saint's tomb during religious holidays, called moussem. In some instances, it is disallowed for fear of offending the saint, or for fear of the combination of the saint's power and the power of the ahwash. Very religious Moroccans may choose not to take part in the ahwash, because they believe the devil is a part of the performance.

The celebration of an ahwash is both an important communal and spiritual practice, sometimes leading to a supernatural experience; there are many stories from southern Moroccan villages of performers who are clairvoyant.

== Gallery ==
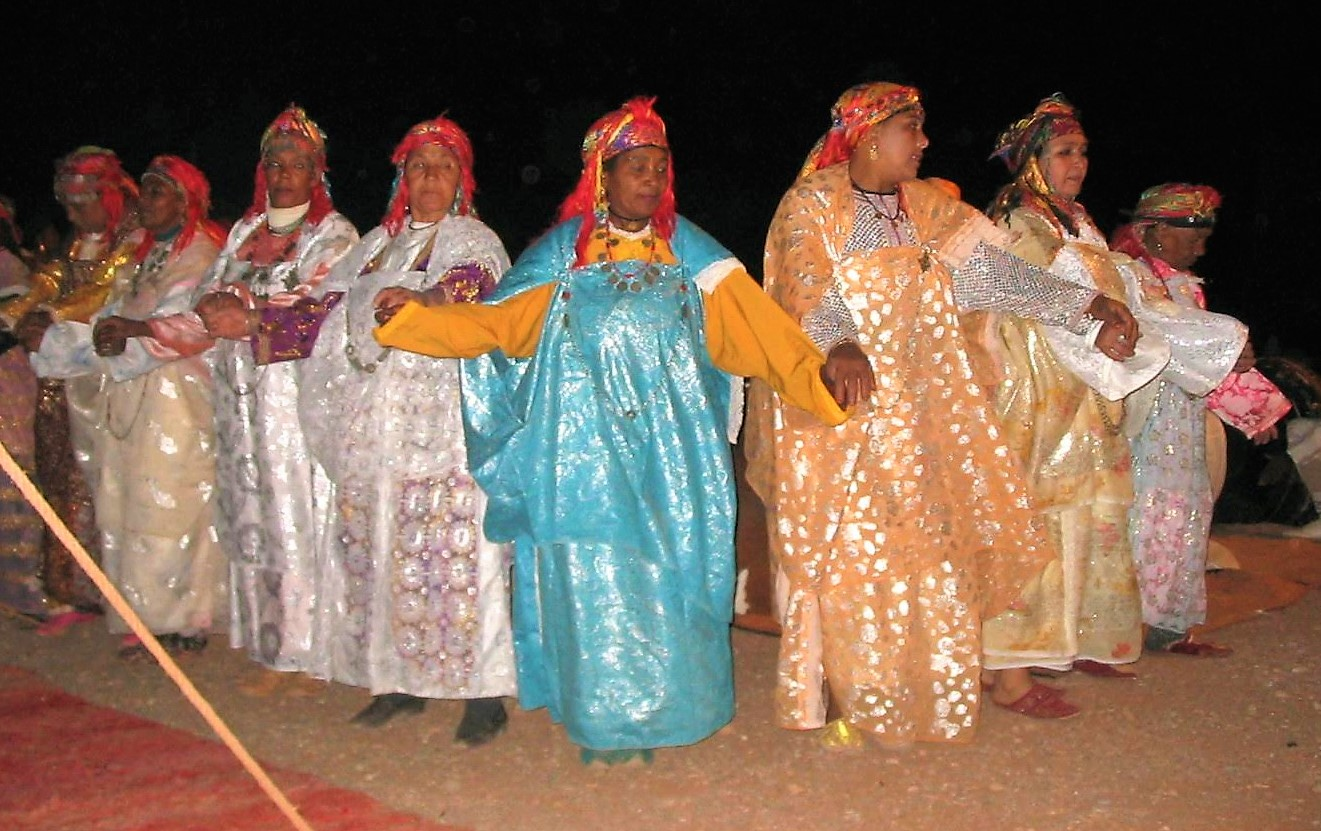
From Telouet

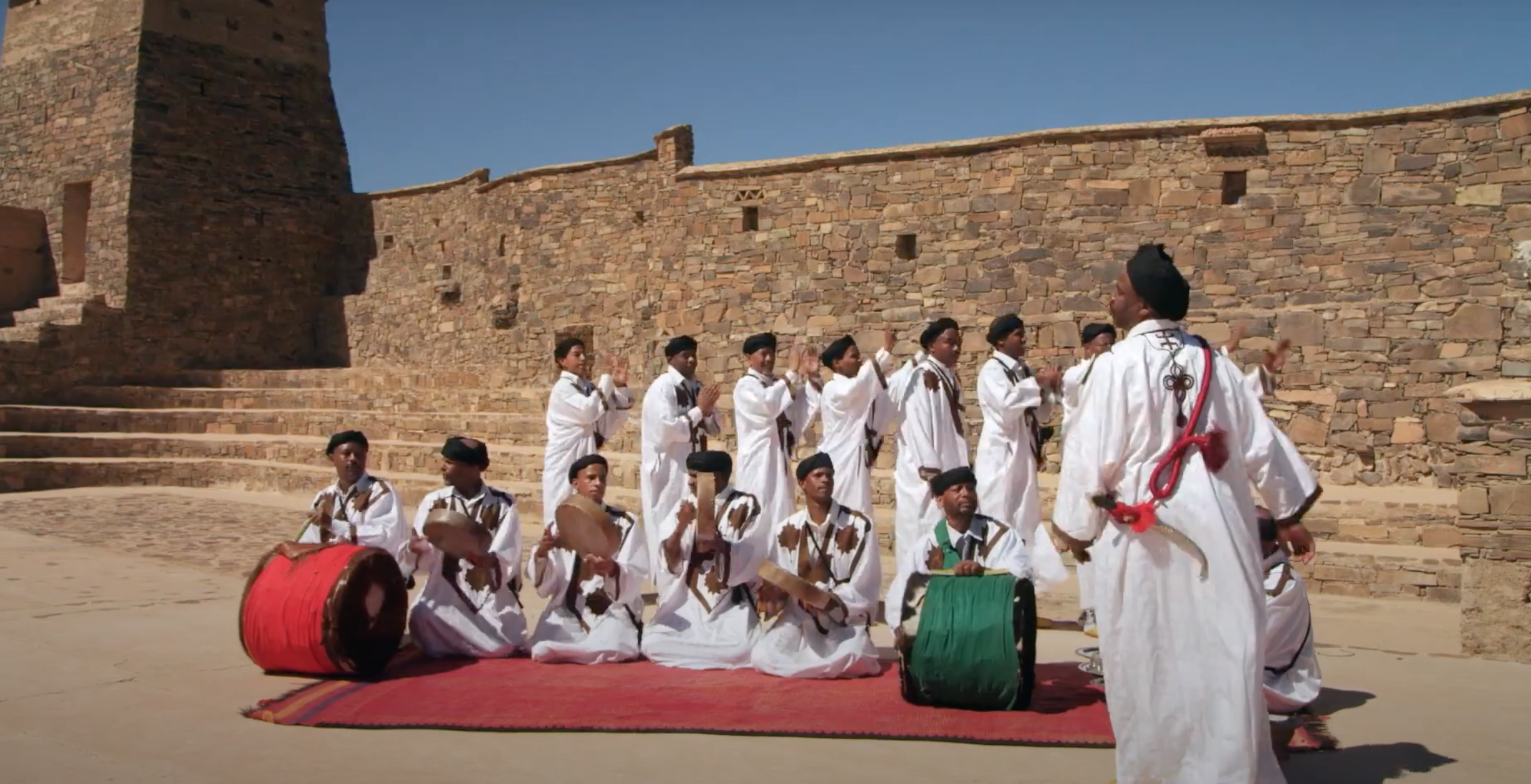
From Assa.

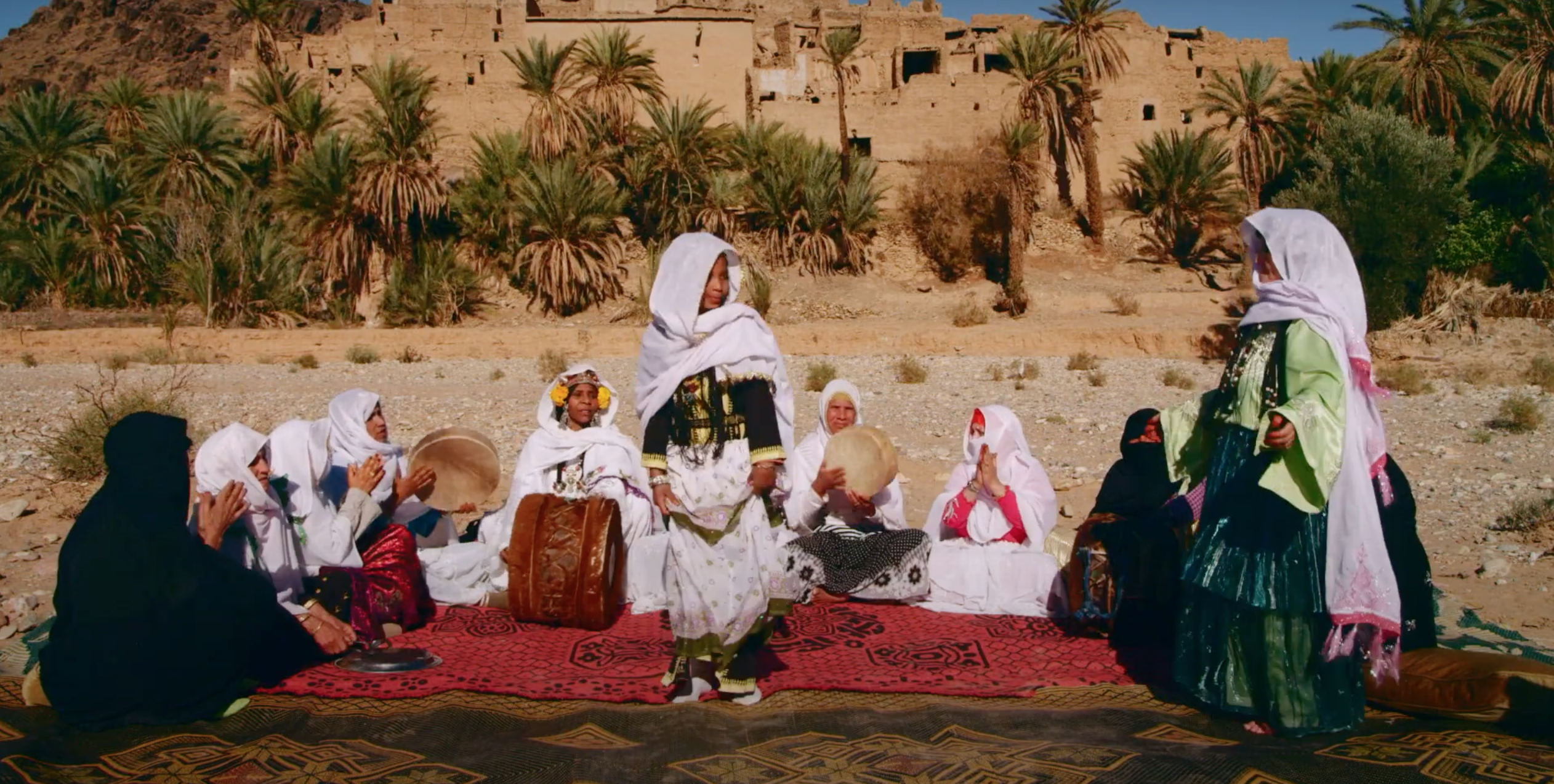
From Tamanaret

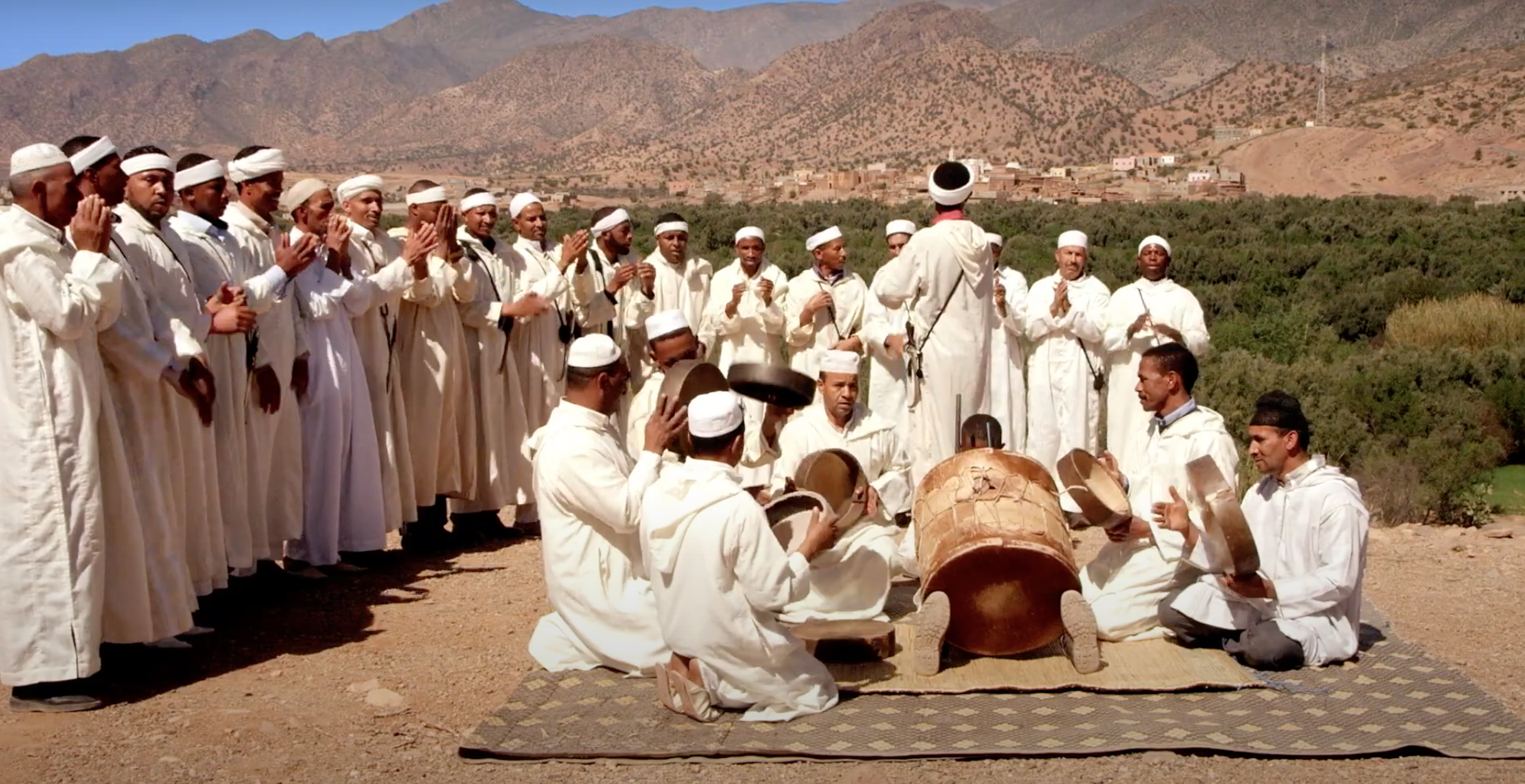
From Aoulouz.

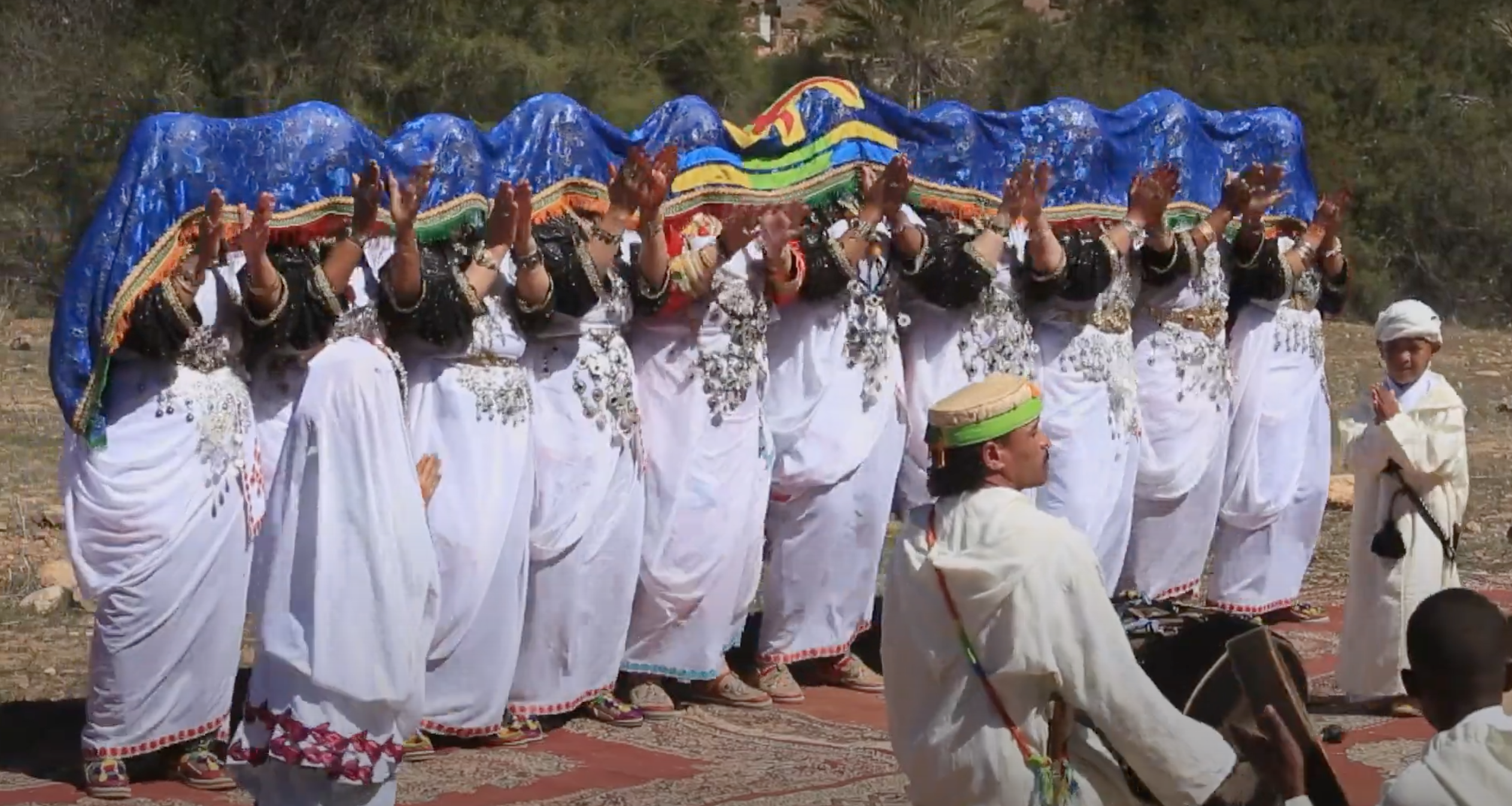
From Tafraout.

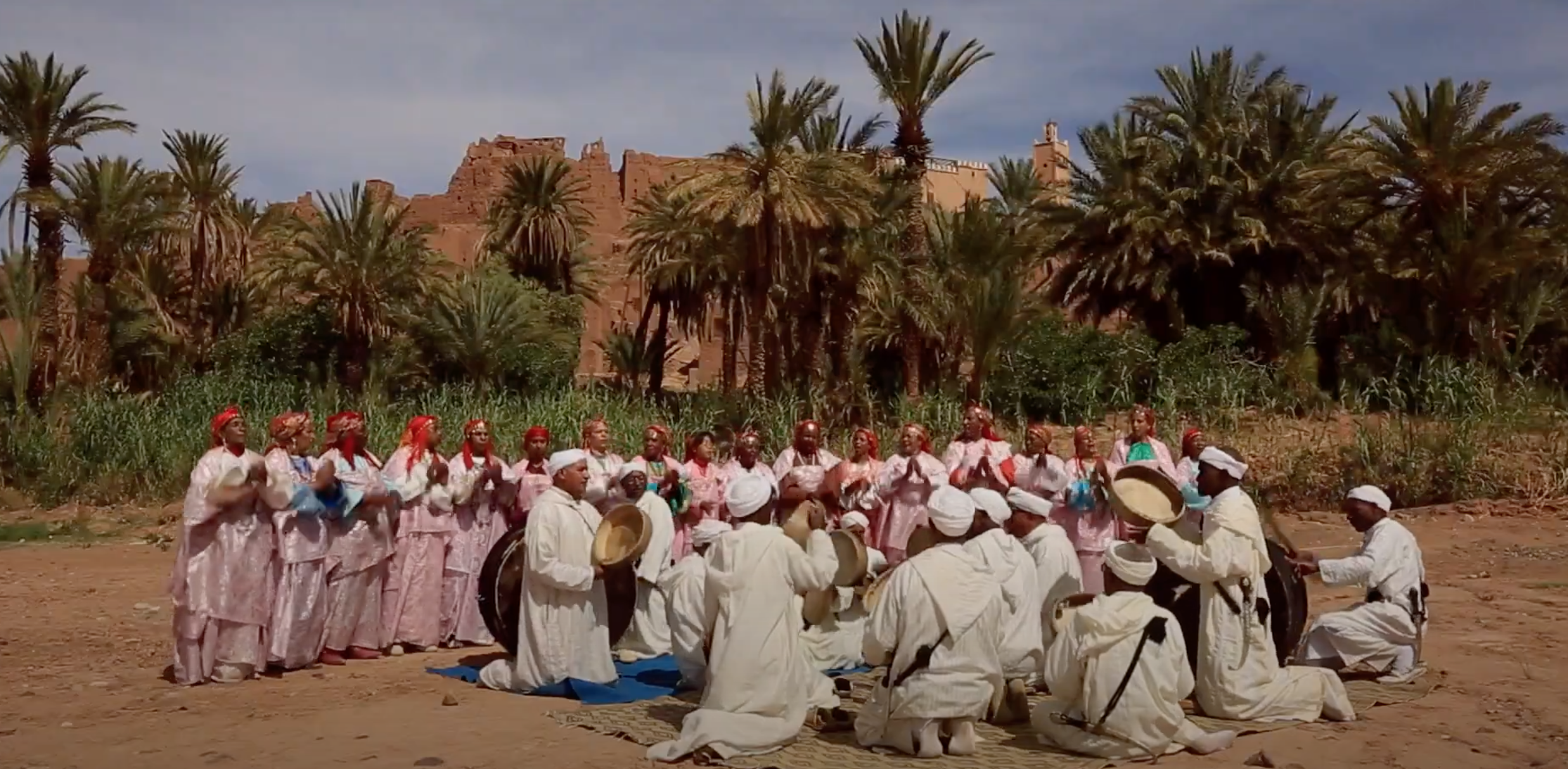
From Ouarzazate.

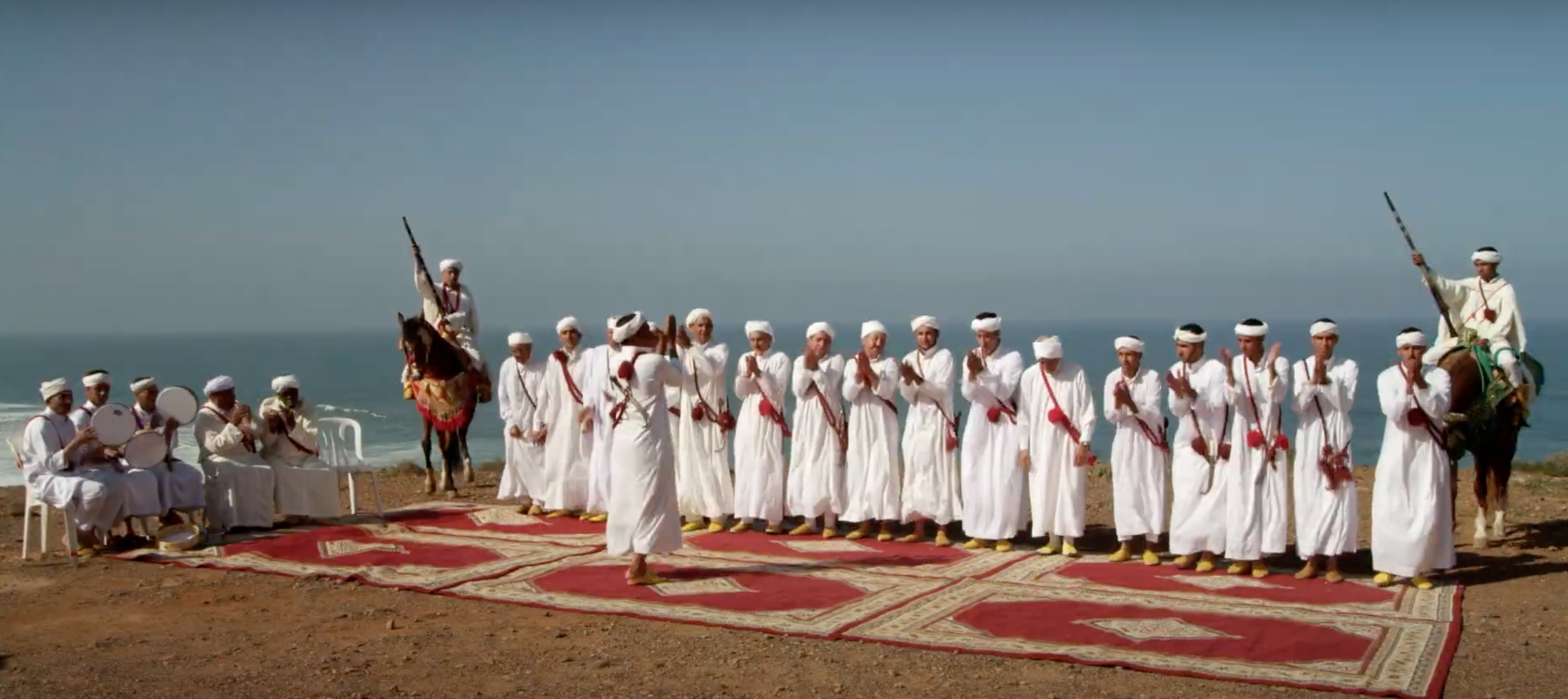
From Mirleft

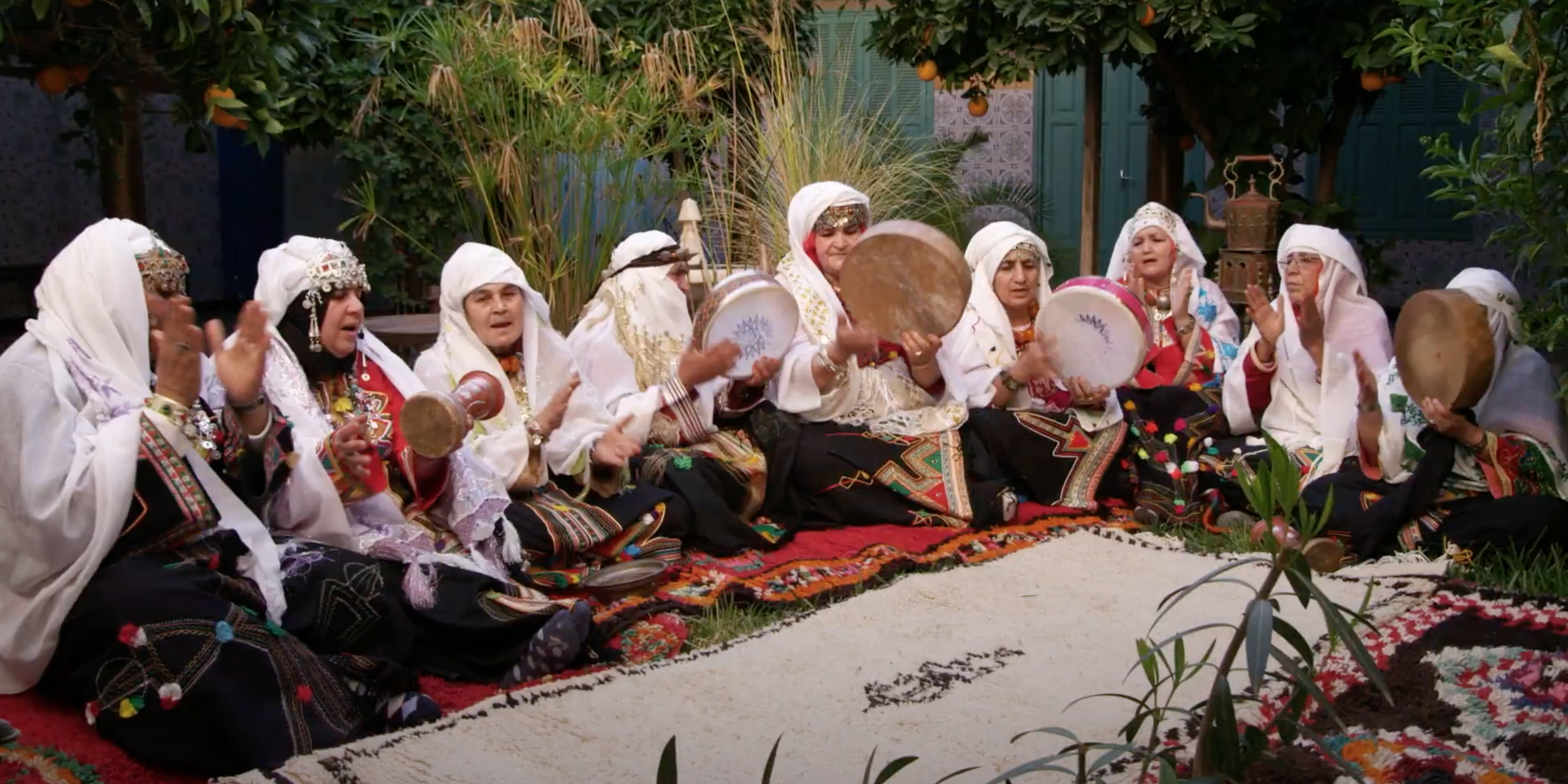
From Tiznit.

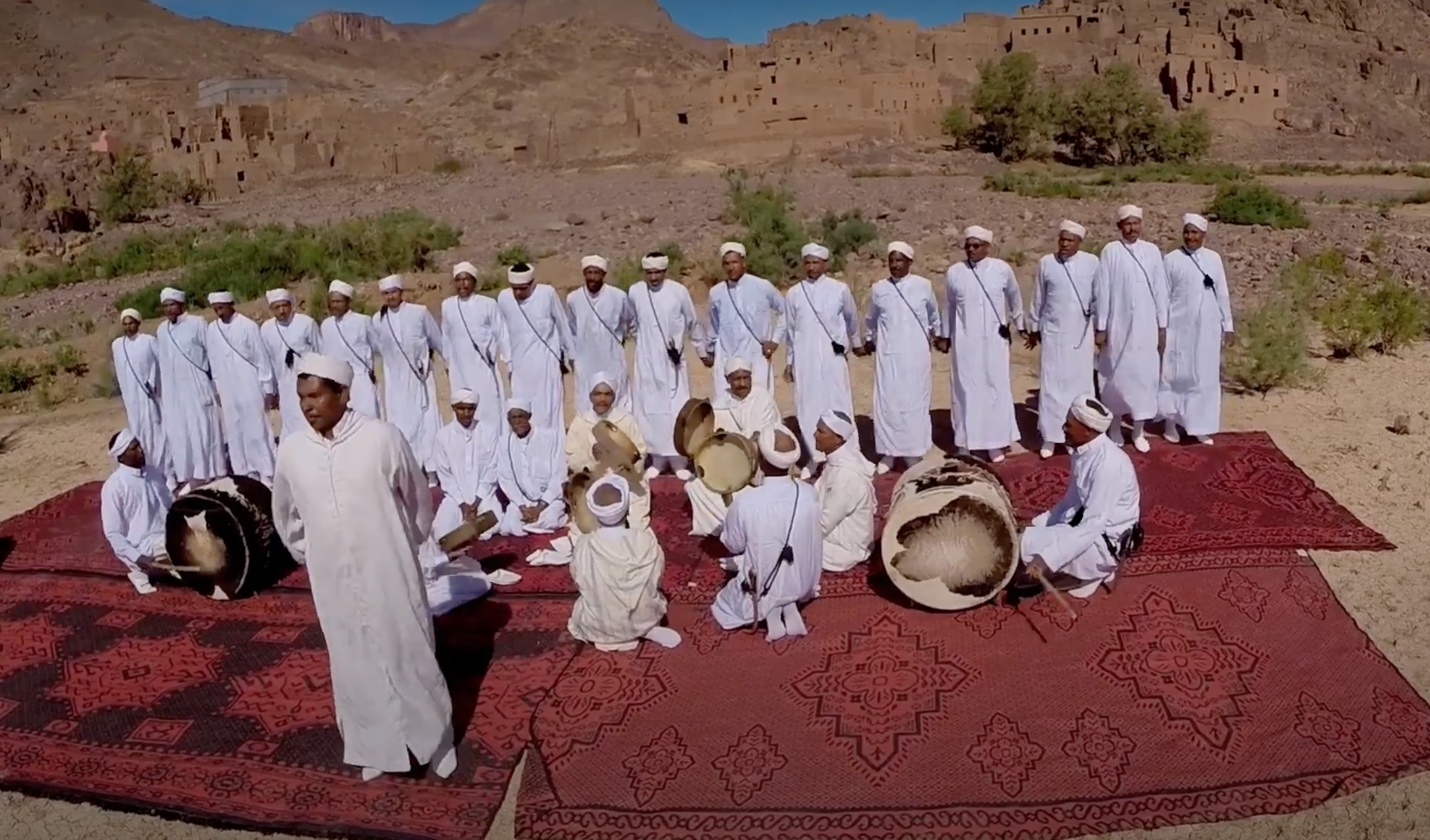
From Agdez.

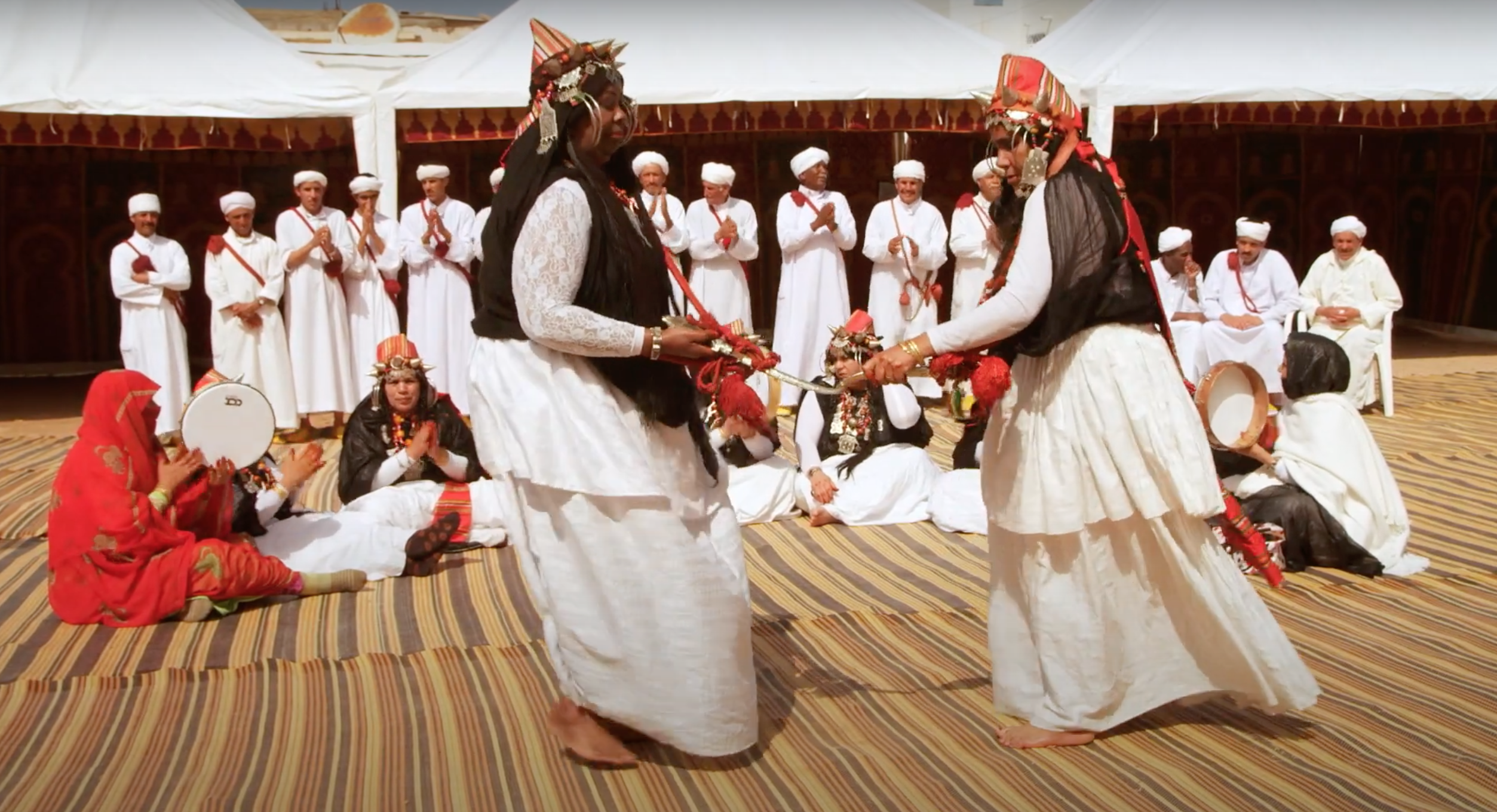
From Ait Baamrane.

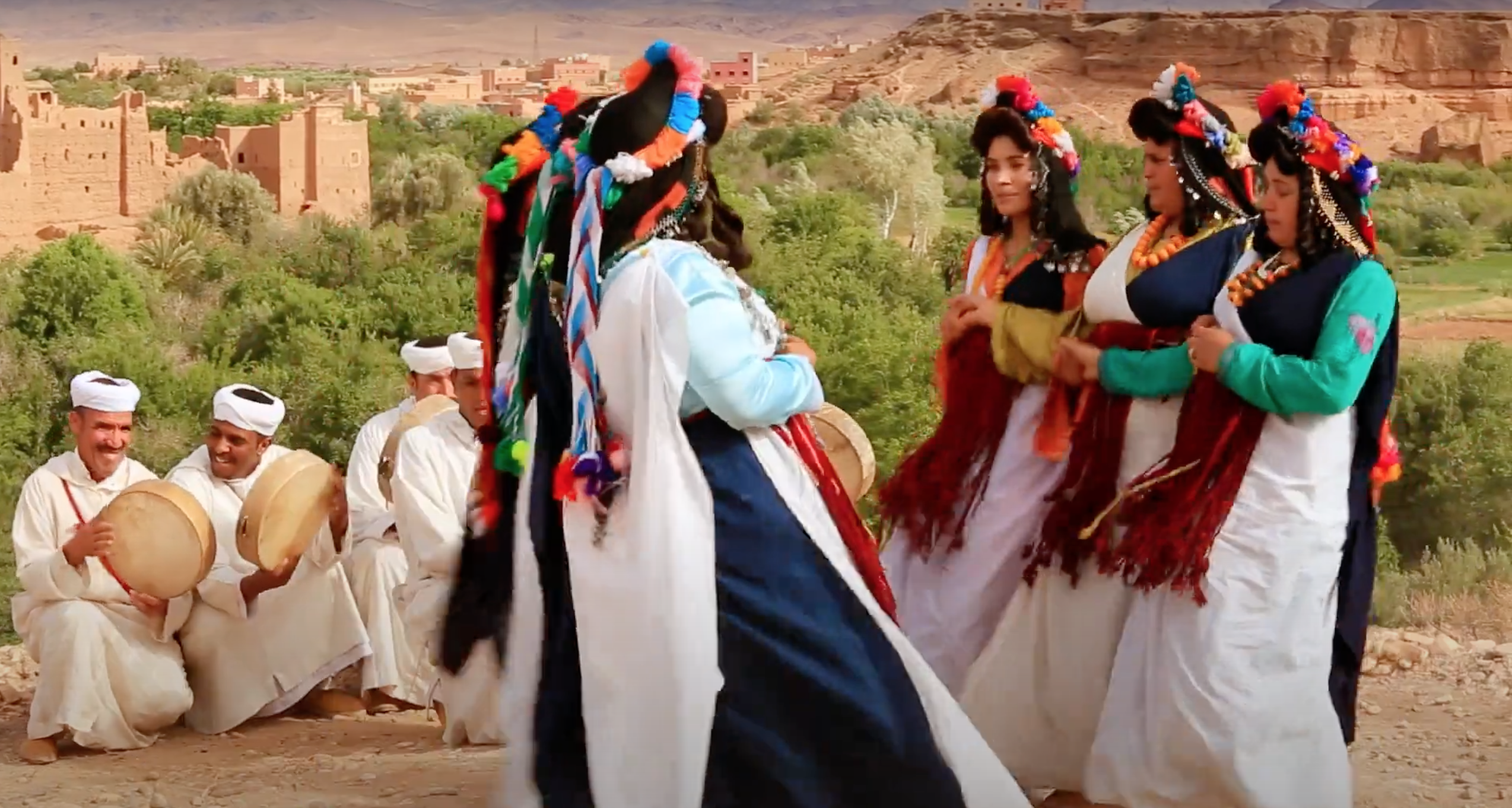
From Kelaat Mgouna.

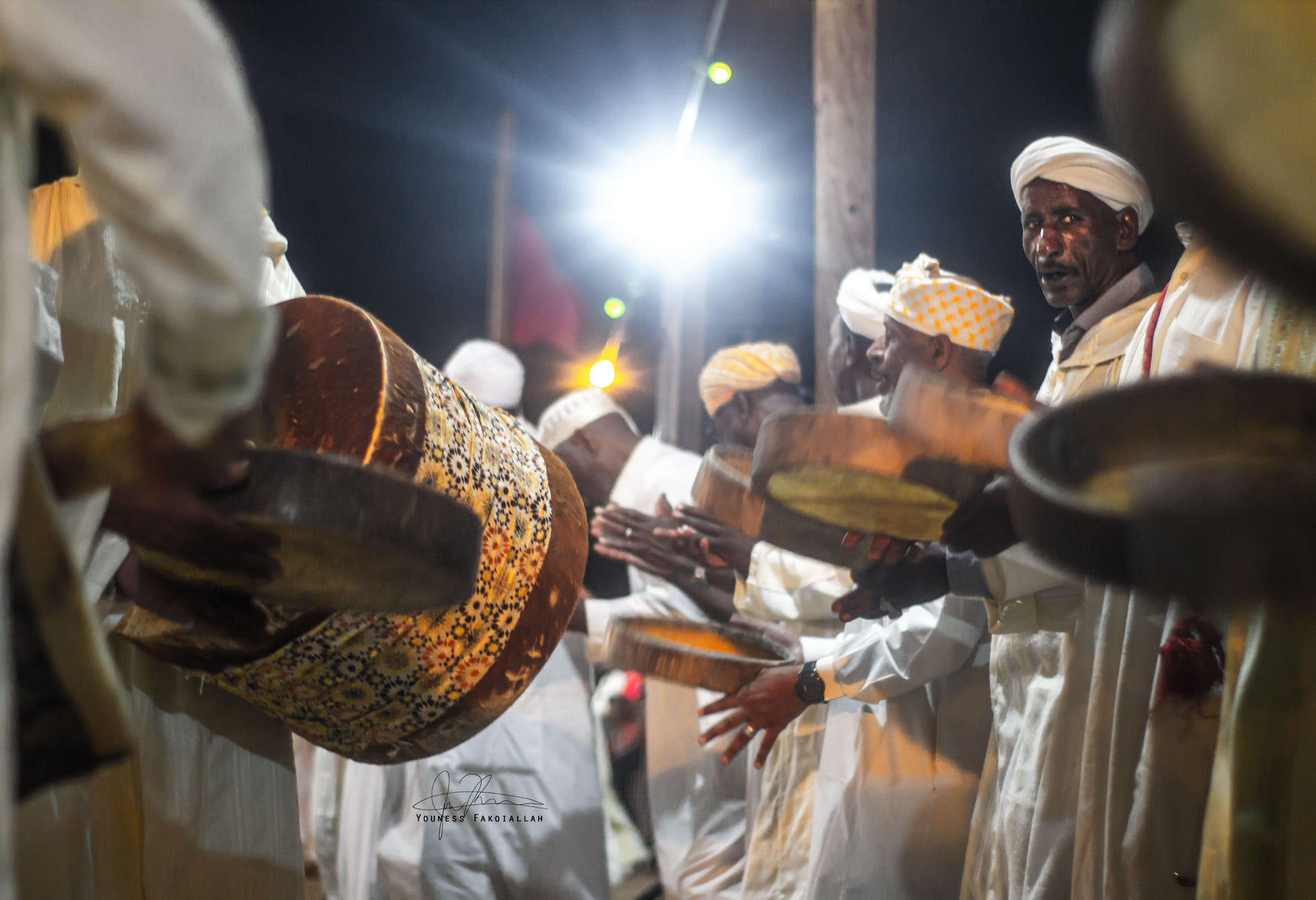
From Agred Tamanaret (berberized Haratin ethnical group called issuqin)
