= Tamnougalt =

- Town
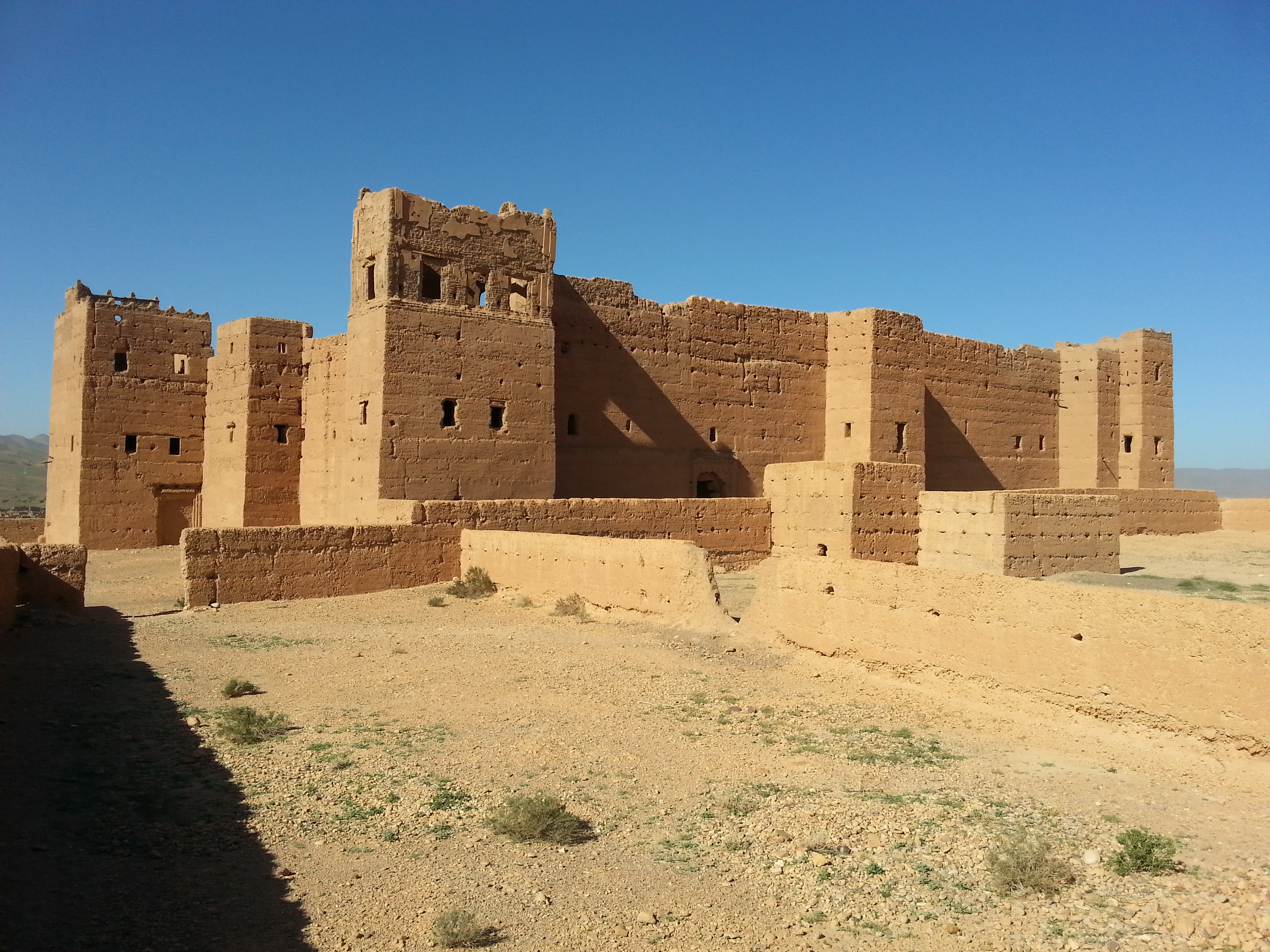
- Kasbah of Tamnougalt
- Interactive map of Tamnougalt
- Coordinates: 30°40′48″N 6°23′17″W
- Country: Morocco
- Region: Drâa-Tafilalet
- Province: Zagora Province
- Time zone: UTC+0 (GMT)

Tamnougalt is a kasbah and date palm oasis in the Atlas Mountains, and located in the Draa River valley in Morocco, some 75 kilometers south of Ouarzazate. The village is close to Agdz and has a famous kasbah. The Jbel Kissane rises to the north dominating the landscape. It is the former capital of the Mezguita region and residence of former caïds. Its name means 'meeting point' in Tachelhit. Each year, in the first week of October the Moussem Ellama is held, a cultural and religious festival for all villages in the neighbourhood.
