= Jbel Kissane =

Mountain in Morocco

Jbel Kissane جبل كيسان ⴰⴷⵔⴰⵔ ⵏ ⴽⵉⵙⴰⵏ
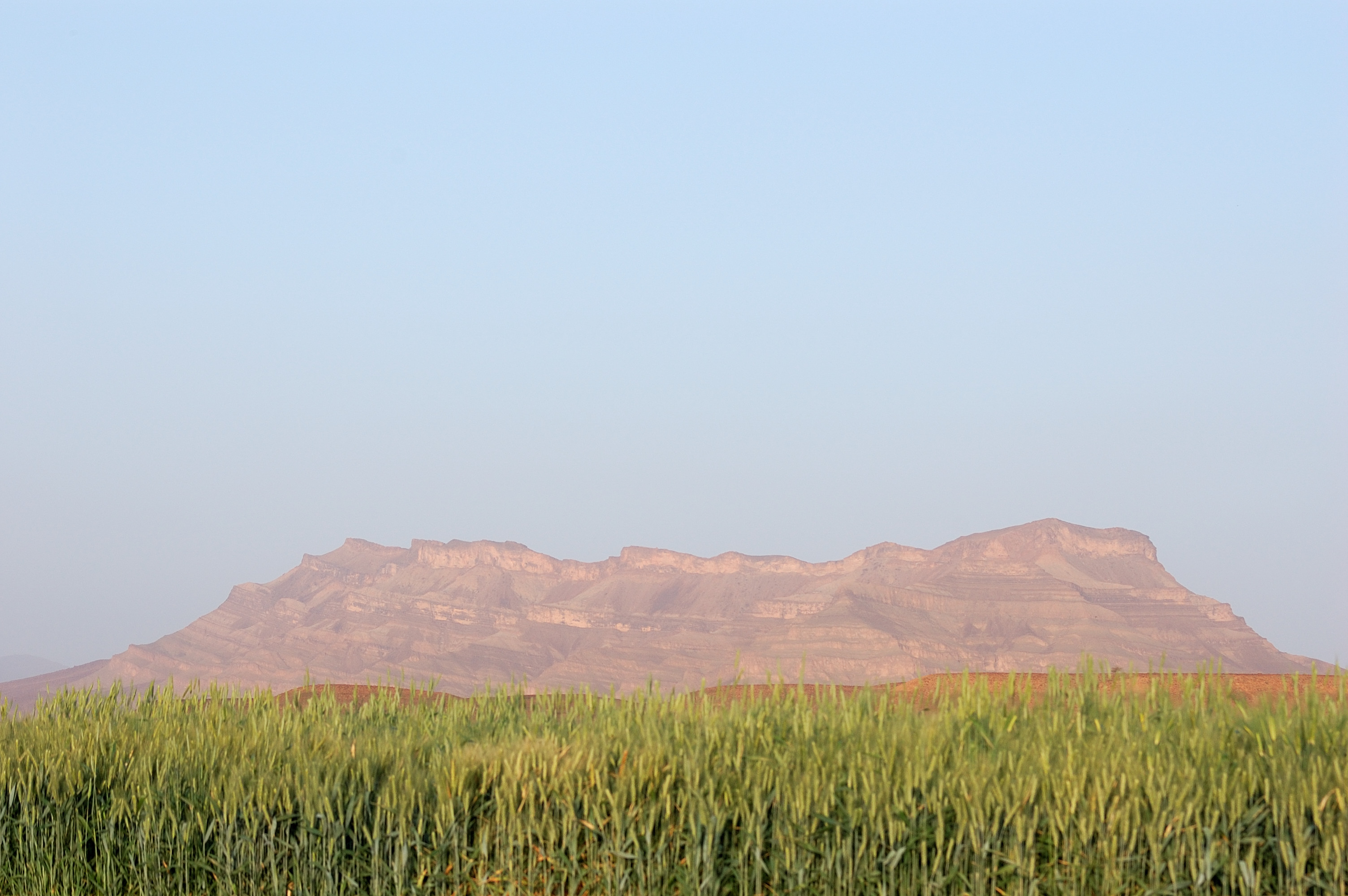
- View of Jbel Kissane

Highest point
- Elevation: 1,485 m (4,872 ft)
- Coordinates: 30°42′10″N 06°19′41″W

Geography
- Location within Morocco
- Location: Morocco
- Parent range: Anti-Atlas

Climbing
- First ascent: Unknown
- Easiest route: From Agdz

Mount Kissane (Jbel Kissane) is a mountain in southeastern Morocco, in the region of Drâa-Tafilalet. It is a distinctive mountain located in the Anti-Atlas range along the valley of the Draa River.

== Toponymy ==
The word Kissane كيسان means "glasses" in Arabic and the mountain is so named because it is deemed to look like the glasses of tea behind a tea pot in the Moroccan style of serving tea.

== Geography ==
Mount Kissane is a small rocky mountain range with a synclinal pattern. It has a length of 14 km and a maximum width of about 1.8 km. On the top of the mountain there are two ridges cut by a ravine in the middle. There are several peaks; the highest summit is located at the western end of the range, reaching 1485 m.

=== Importance in the region ===
The Jbel Kissane is a characteristic mountain whose shape dominates the eastern landscape of the town of Agdz. Its bare rock takes a variety of pastel hues such as pink, salmon and violet, depending on the angle of the sunlight and the time of the day. It is as well a dominant feature of the panoramic views from nearby villages such as Ouliz, Taliouine, Ait Ali, Tinfoula, Aremd, Tisserghate, Ait el Kharj, Igamodene, Tamnougalt, Talate, Talamzit, Timiderte, Ighrghr and Afra.

== Features ==
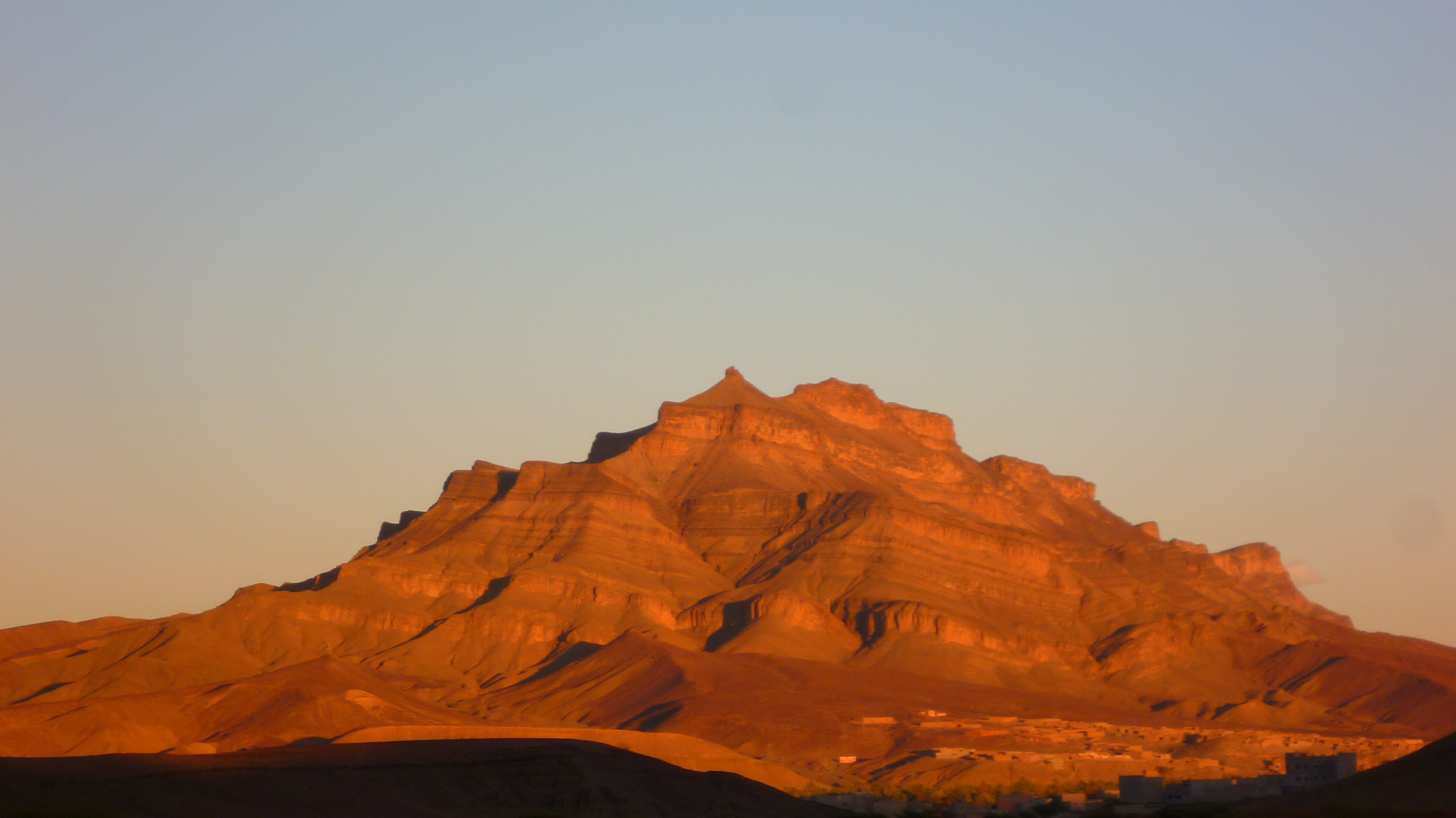
Looking east at Jbel Kissane from Agdz at sunset

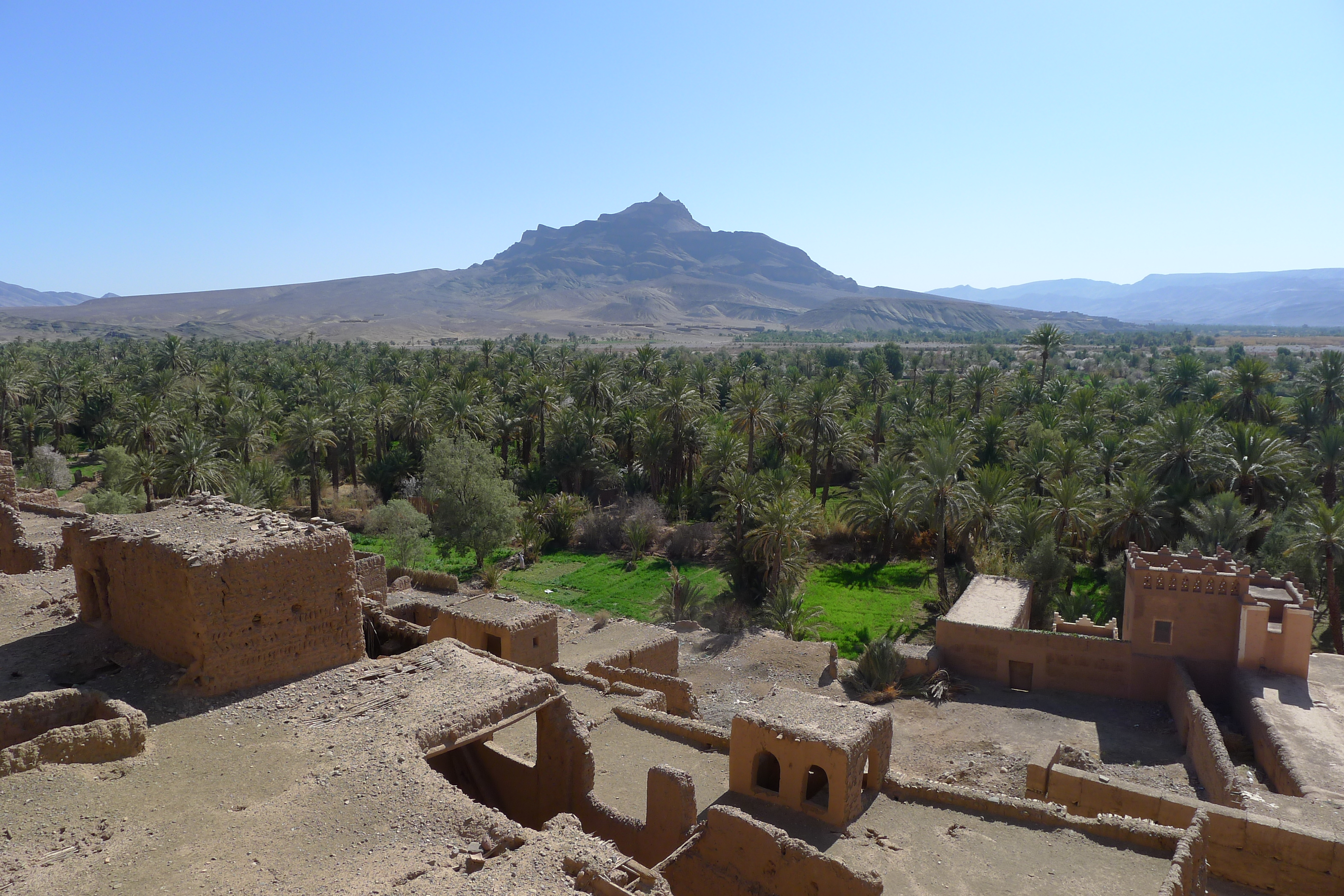
Landscape with the Jbel Kissane in the background

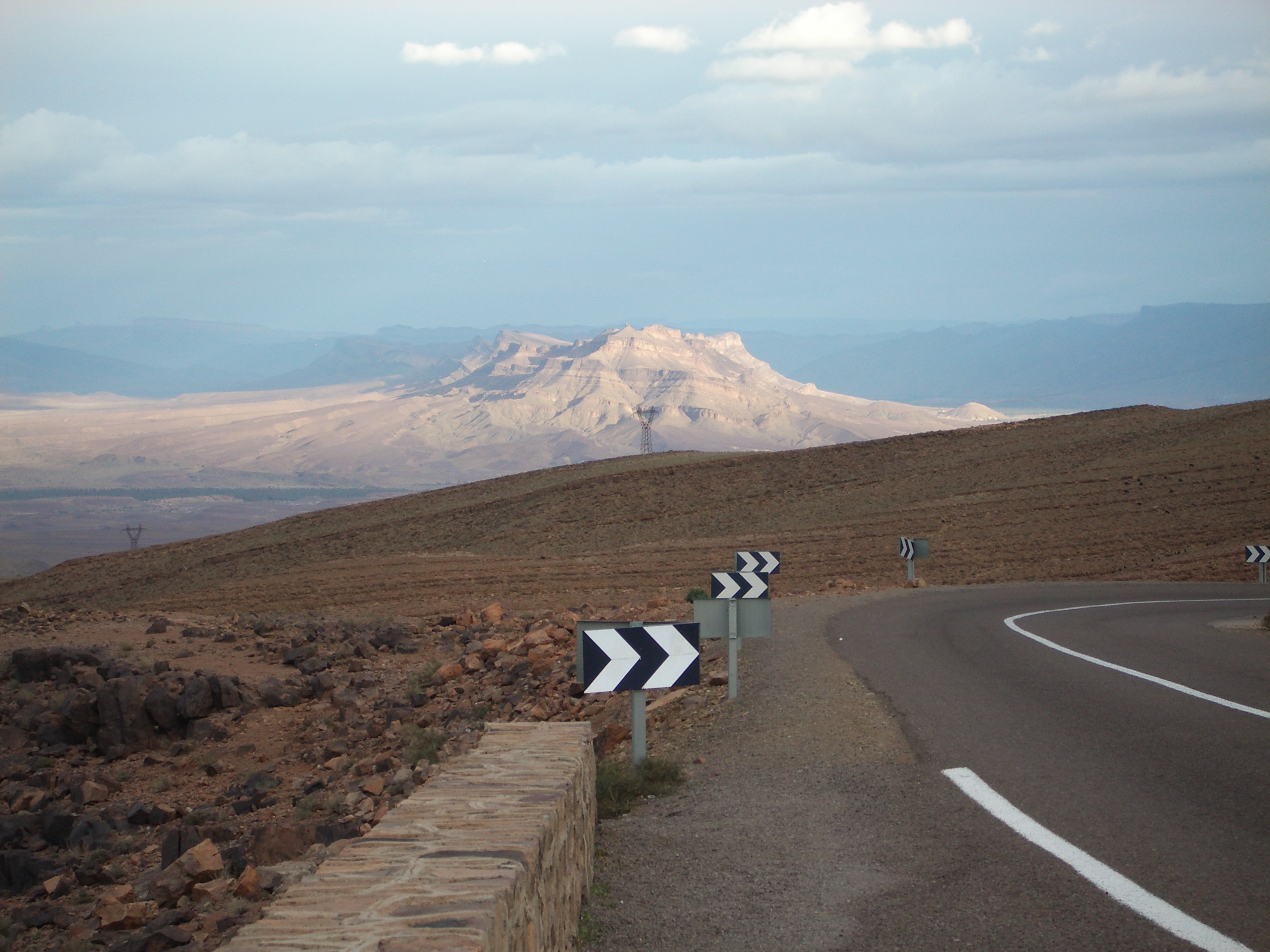
View of Jebel Kissane from the road
