= El Mansour Eddahbi Reservoir =

Reservoir in Morocco

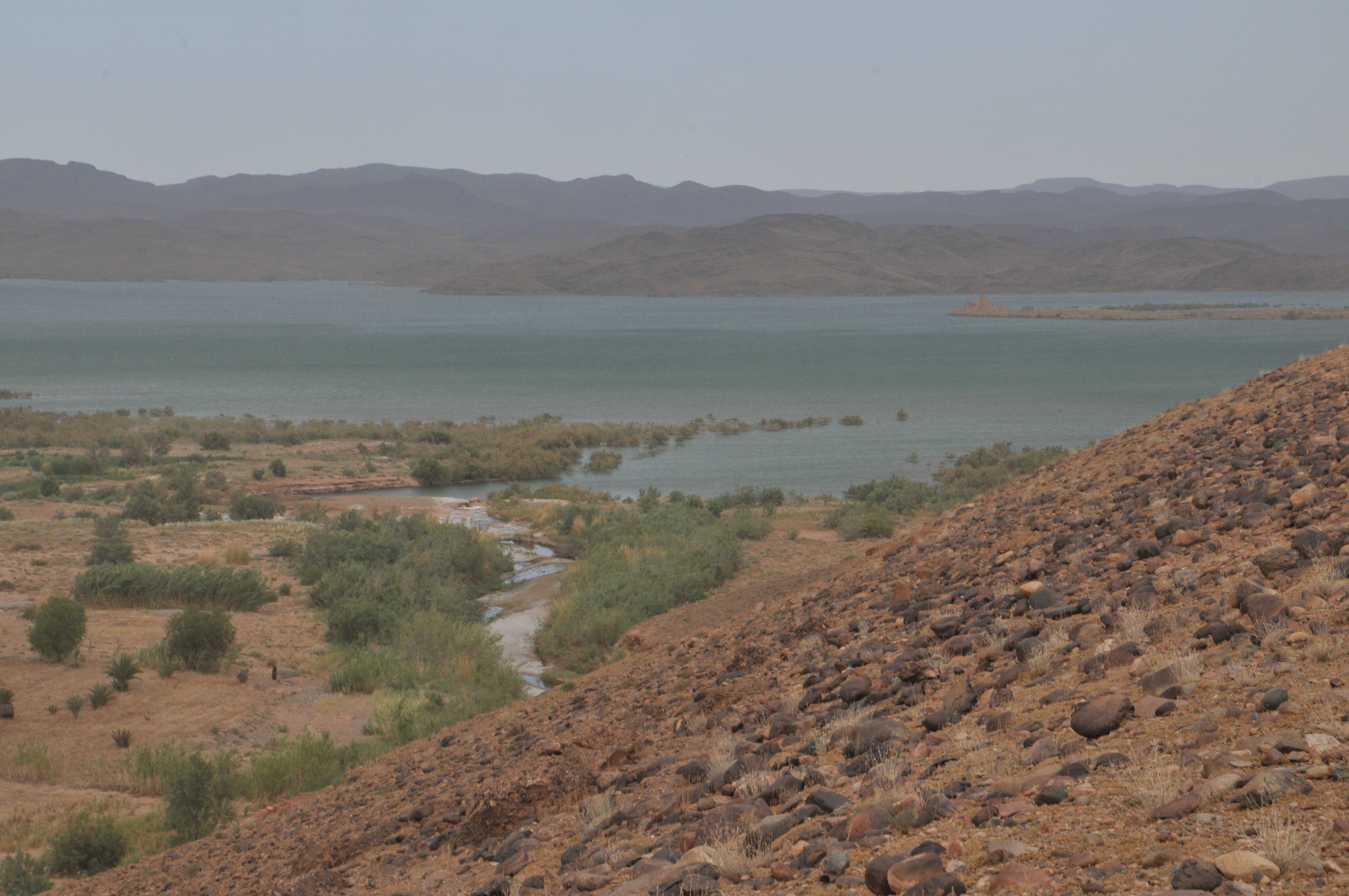
May 2015

The El Mansour Eddahbi Reservoir, sometimes also known as the El Mansour Ad Dahbi Reservoir, is located east of the city of Ouarzazate in the south of the High Atlas in Morocco. The lake surface is divided into two parts—the significantly larger eastern lake is mainly fed by the Draa River; the smaller western part, on the other hand, by the Ouarzazate River (Assif n’Tidili) and several smaller streams, which, however, only carry water in winter and early spring.

== Name ==
The name derives from the Saadian sultan Ahmed el-Mansour ed-Dahbi (or similar transliterations), where "ed-Dahbi" / "Eddahbi" reflects a more French-influenced Romanization common in Morocco, while "Ad Dahbi" is a closer direct transliteration from Arabic.

== Function ==
The approximately 16 km long and maximum 5 km wide reservoir primarily serves to regulate the Draa, which flows out in a southeastern direction, whose discharge volume at Agdz or at Zagora fluctuated between almost 0 m³ and 5,600 m³ per second depending on the season before the reservoir's completion. Up to Zagora, and sometimes as far as Mhamid, a fairly uniform water supply can now be achieved, on which the approximately 25,000 hectares of date palm groves and fields in the oasis villages along the river depend; furthermore, a uniform flow velocity protects the riparian zones and thus the agriculturally used areas from excessive erosion. Since the completion of the reservoir, numerous wealthy Moroccans have built representative villas on its rugged shores, whose lawn areas are irrigated with the lake water. Fishing is permitted; however, motorboats are prohibited.

== Hydroelectricity ==
The hydroelectric power plant has an installed capacity of 10 MW. The average annual generation fluctuates with the water flow of the Draa, in 2008 it was 18.4 million kWh and in 2009 35.7 million kWh.

== Fauna and Flora ==
The lake, which is on average about 30 meters deep, has become the home of several fish species, which, like frogs, lizards, etc., are hunted by all kinds of herons. In addition, migratory birds such as ducks and grebes occasionally arrive, which in turn are the preferred prey of birds of prey and foxes. Only in a few areas of the riparian zones do smaller trees, shrubs, and reeds grow, so that no breeding areas have yet been established.

== Siltation ==
Since there is no sediment outflow, the volume of the reservoir has shrunk by 50% due to siltation/sedimentation.
