= Anmugar Amadal N Zafran =

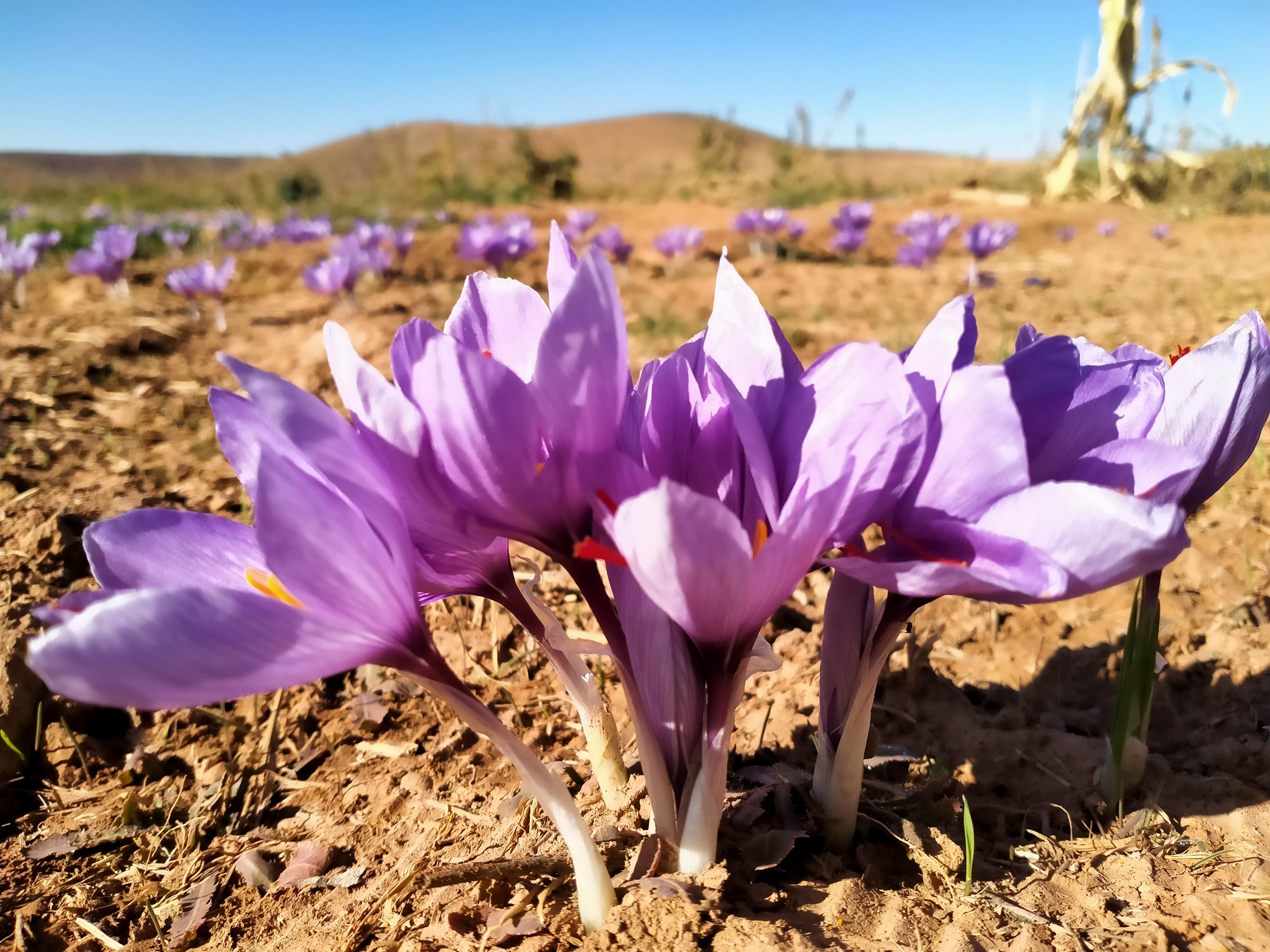
Saffron field in Taliouine

Anmugar Amadal N Zafran (Berber) is an annual saffron festival hosted in Taliouine, Morocco in late October/early November. The festival aims to celebrate the saffron harvest and encourage the best practices of saffron cultivation and sale.

Taliouine is famous for its saffron production, with Morocco being one of the main exporters of the spice worldwide.

The festival is organized by the International Saffron Festival association in partnership with the Belgian Development Agency (CTB).
