= Taliouine =

Taliouine ⵜⴰⵍⵉⵡⵉⵏ تاليوين
- Town
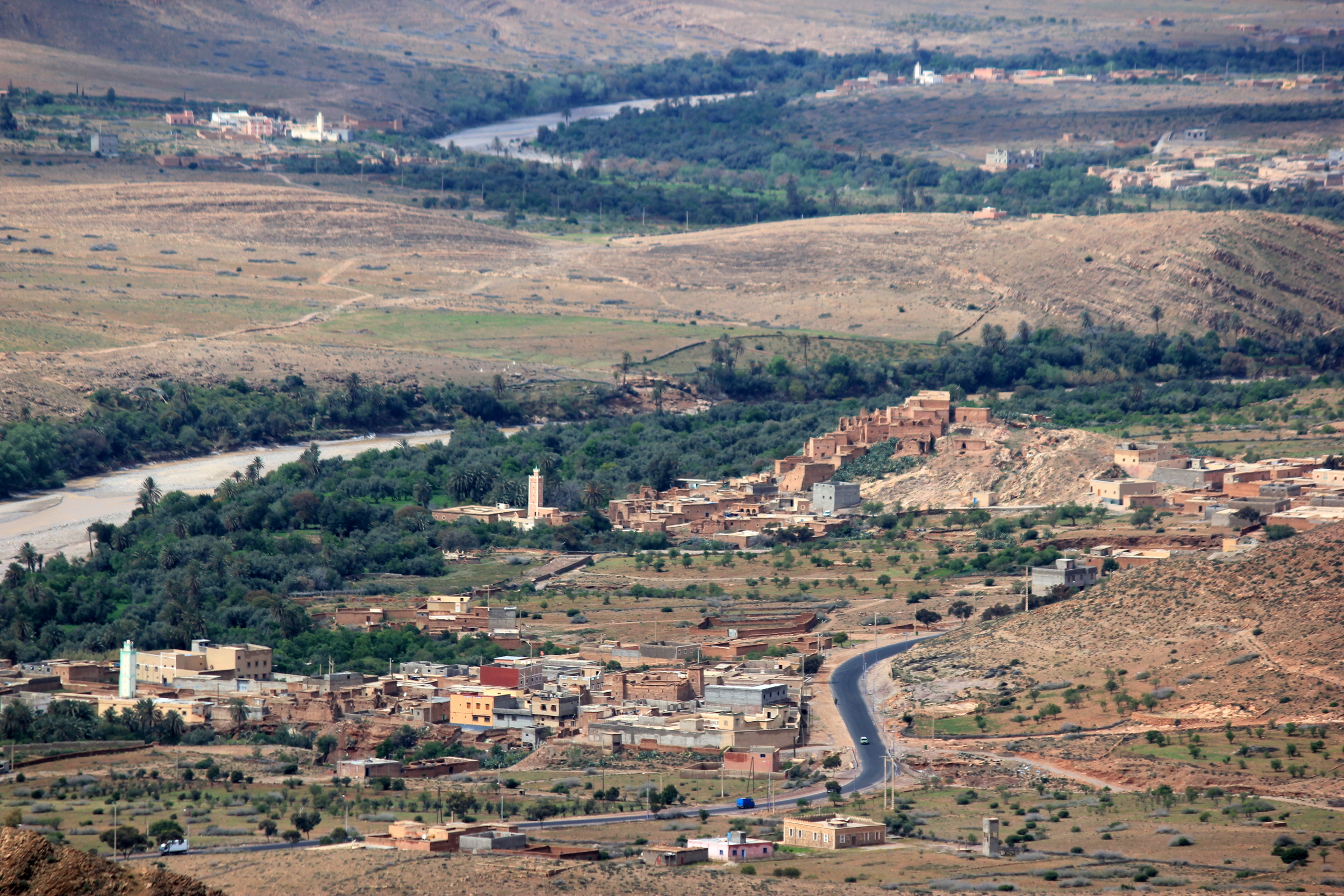
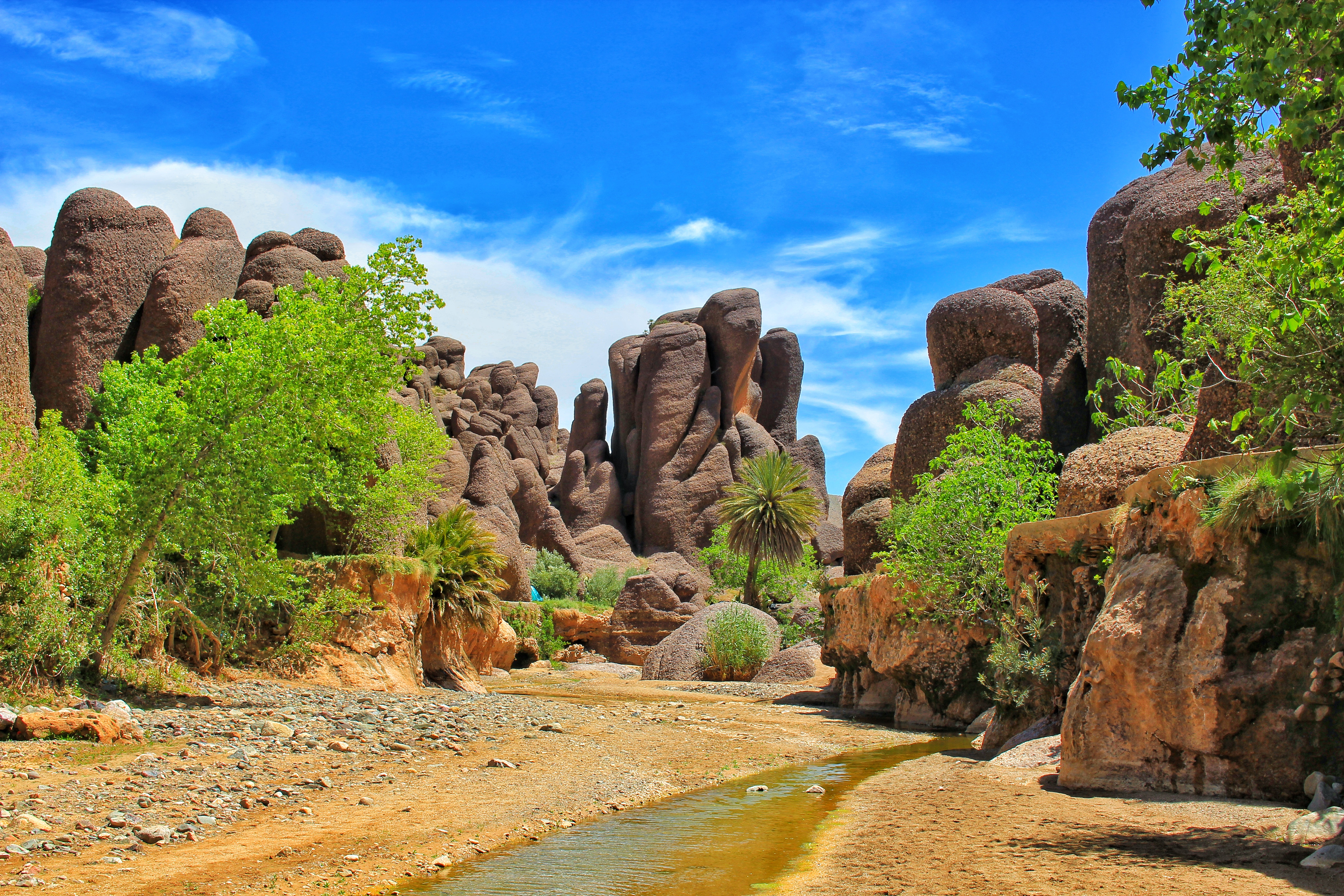
- Interactive map of Taliouine
- Coordinates: 30°31′58″N 7°55′32″W
- Region: Souss-Massa
- Province: Taroudant

Population (2004)
  - Total: 5,844
- Time zone: UTC+0 (GMT)
- Postal code: 83500

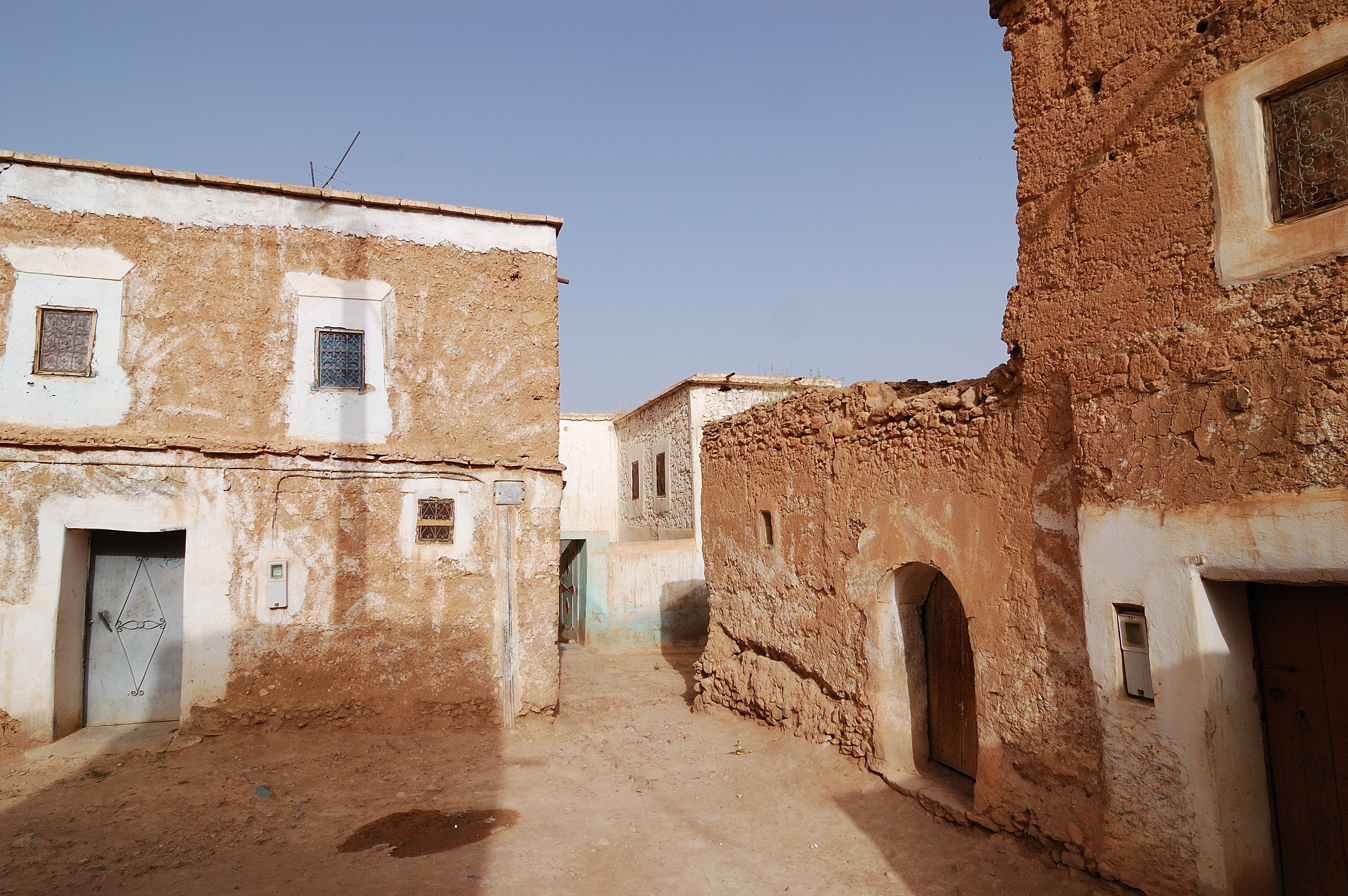
A street in Taliouine c. 2009

Taliouine (Standard Moroccan Tamazight: ⵜⴰⵍⵉⵡⵉⵏ) (Arabic: تاليوين) is a town in Taroudant Province, Souss-Massa, Morocco. According to the 2004 census it has a population of 5,844.

Taliouine is famous for its production of saffron and is one of the main exporters of this spice worldwide. The town celebrates Anmugar Amadal N Zafran, Le Festival International de Safran every year in winter (usually November), the season in which the saffron flower germinates.
