= Draa River =

Coordinates: 28.6817°N 11.1203°W

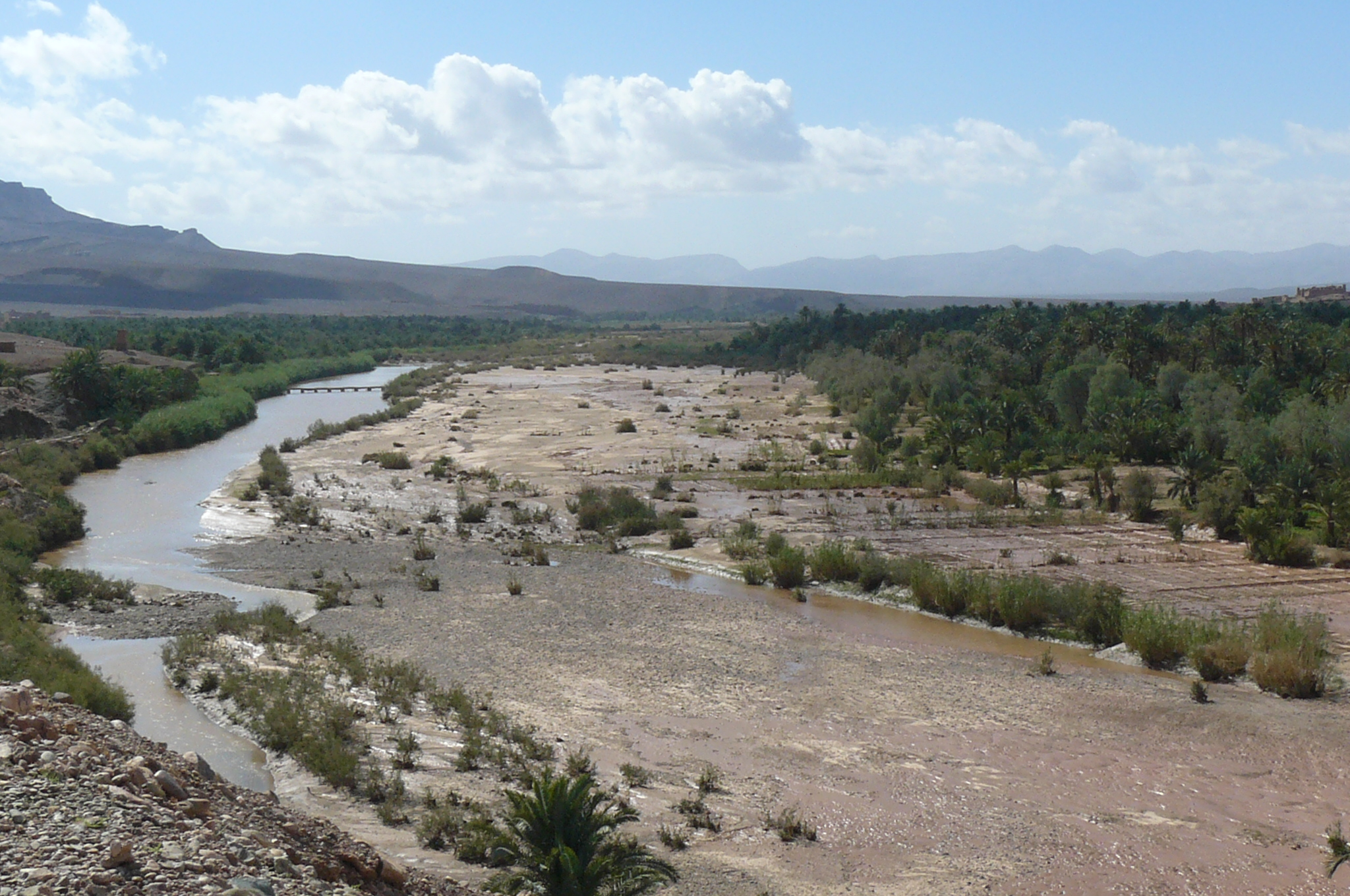

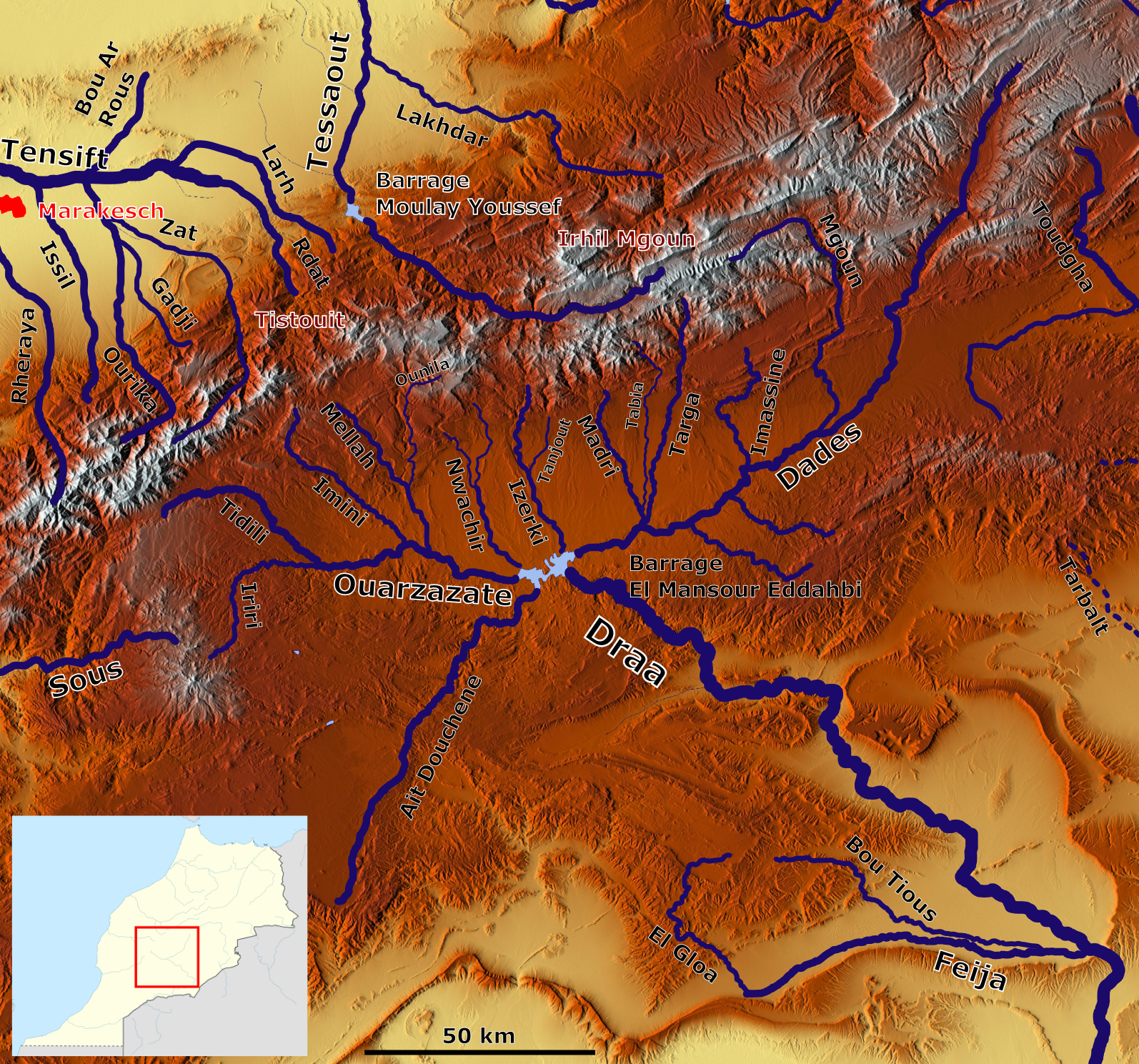
- the Upper Draa and its tributaries
- Native name: ⴰⵙⵉⴼ ⵏ ⴷⵔⴰ (Standard Moroccan Tamazight); وادي درعة (Arabic)

Location
- Countries: Morocco

Physical characteristics
- Source: Dadès River
- 2nd source: Imini River
- Mouth: Atlantic
- Length: 1,100 km (680 mi)

Basin features
- Progression: Southeast

Ramsar Wetland
- Official name: Embouchure de l'oued Dr'a
- Designated: 15 January 2005
- Reference no.: 1477

Ramsar Wetland
- Official name: Moyenne Dr'a
- Designated: 15 January 2005
- Reference no.: 1482

The Draa (Arabic: وادي درعة, romanized: wādī dar'a; Standard Moroccan Tamazight: ⴰⵙⵉⴼ ⵏ ⴷⵔⴰ, romanized: asif n dra); also spelled Dra or Drâa, in older sources mostly Darha or Dara is Morocco's longest river, at 1,100 kilometres (680 mi). It is formed by the confluence of the Dadès River and Imini River. It flows from the High Atlas mountains, initially south-eastward to Tagounite, and from Tagounite mostly westwards to its mouth in the Atlantic Ocean somewhat north of Tan-Tan.

In 1971, the (El) Mansour Eddahabi dam was constructed to service the regional capital of Ouarzazate and to regulate the flow of the Draa. Most of the year the part of the Draa after Tagounite falls dry. In the first half of the 20th century, the lowest course of the Draa marked the boundary between the French protectorate of Morocco and the area under Spanish rule.

The valley contains the Fezouata formations, which are Burgess shale-type deposits dating to the Lower Ordovician, filling an important preservational window between the common Cambrian lagerstätten and the Late Ordovician Soom shale. In the fossilized fauna were numerous organisms previously thought to have died out after the mid-Cambrian.

== History ==
=== Prehistory ===
Human occupation in the Draa valley and adjacent mountains dates at least to the Lower Paleolithic, as attested by Oldowan and Acheulean tools found near Tamegroute. Middle Paleolithic sites are widespread.

Neolithic-era rock art can be found throughout the Draa valley, depicting hunting scenes as well as domesticated cattle. The chronology of these sites is uncertain, but the earliest may date to the 3rd millennium BCE.

=== Before 1054 ===
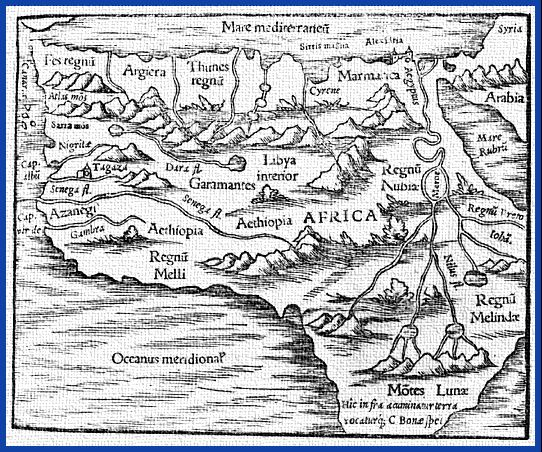
Ptolemy's map of Africa. The River Draa, Dara fl. is in the center of the map, just south of the mountain range, above the word Garamantes. fl. is an abbreviation for flumen, Latin river.

The Draa River was also well known to the ancient Romans. It figures on the first world map in history made by Ptolemy (90–168 AD). (There is no "first world map" made by Ptolemy, nor are there any other known surviving manuscript maps by Ptolemy. Printed "Ptolemaic" maps, first appearing in the latter part of the 15th Century, were based on Ptolemy's geographical data, an example of which would be recorded latitude and longitude of various locations; such maps were not based on any surviving map by Ptolemy.)

=== Wattasids ===
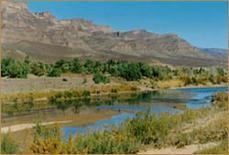
The Draa river

During the reign of the Wattasid Abu al-Abbas Ahmad ibn Muhammad, Askia Ishaq I of the Songhai Empire sent Tuareg raiders into the Draa valley to avenge a diplomatic insult where Morocco had demanded the cession of the valuable Taghaza salt mine.

=== Alaouites ===
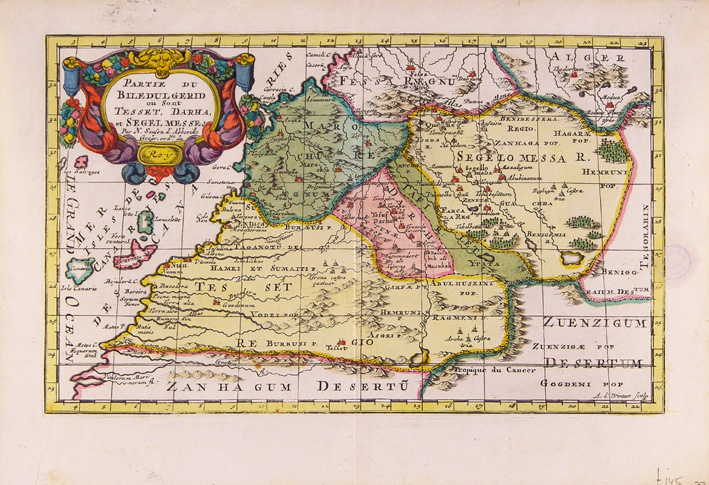
Map of Southern Morocco, 1705, by Nicolaas Sanson (Province of Darha/Draa with pink borders in the middle of the map)

Four of the sons of Ismail Ibn Sharif have been khalifa of the Draa:

- Mulay Muhammad as-Sharif bin Ismail as-Samin (s/o full-brother of Muhammad al-Alam). Khalifa of the Draa 1703.
- Mulay 'Abdu'l-Malik bin Ismail as-Samin. b. ca. 1677. Khalifa of the Draa. He was k. for plotting against his father, 1696.
- Mulay Nasir bin Ismail as-Samin. Khalifa of Draa 1702–1703, and of Tafilalt. Rebelled in 1711–1712. He was k. 1714.
- H.M. Sultan 'Abu Marwan Mulay 'Abdu'l Malik, Sultan of Morocco, etc. b. at Meknes, after 1696, son of H.M. Sultan 'Abul Nasir Mulay Ismail as-Samin bin Sharif, Sultan of Morocco, educ. privately. Khalifa of the Draa 1701–1703, and of Sus 1717–1718. Proclaimed Sultan on the deposition of his elder half-brother 13 March 1728. Deposed at Meknes 18 July 1728. Fled to Fez and arrested there 23 December 1728. He was k. (executed) at Meknes, 2 March 1729 (bur. there at the Mulay Ismail Mausoleum).

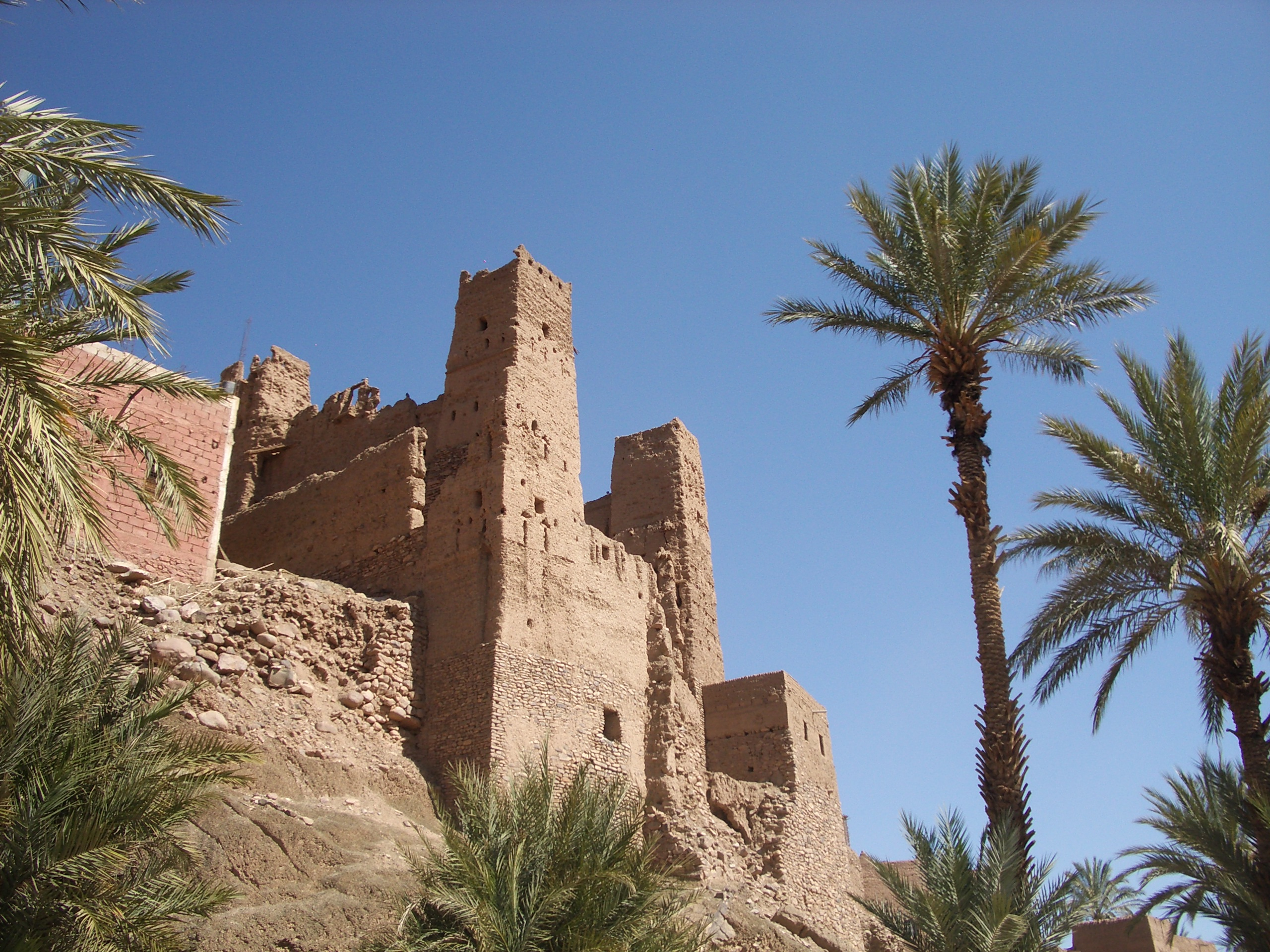
Kashbah in the Draa valley

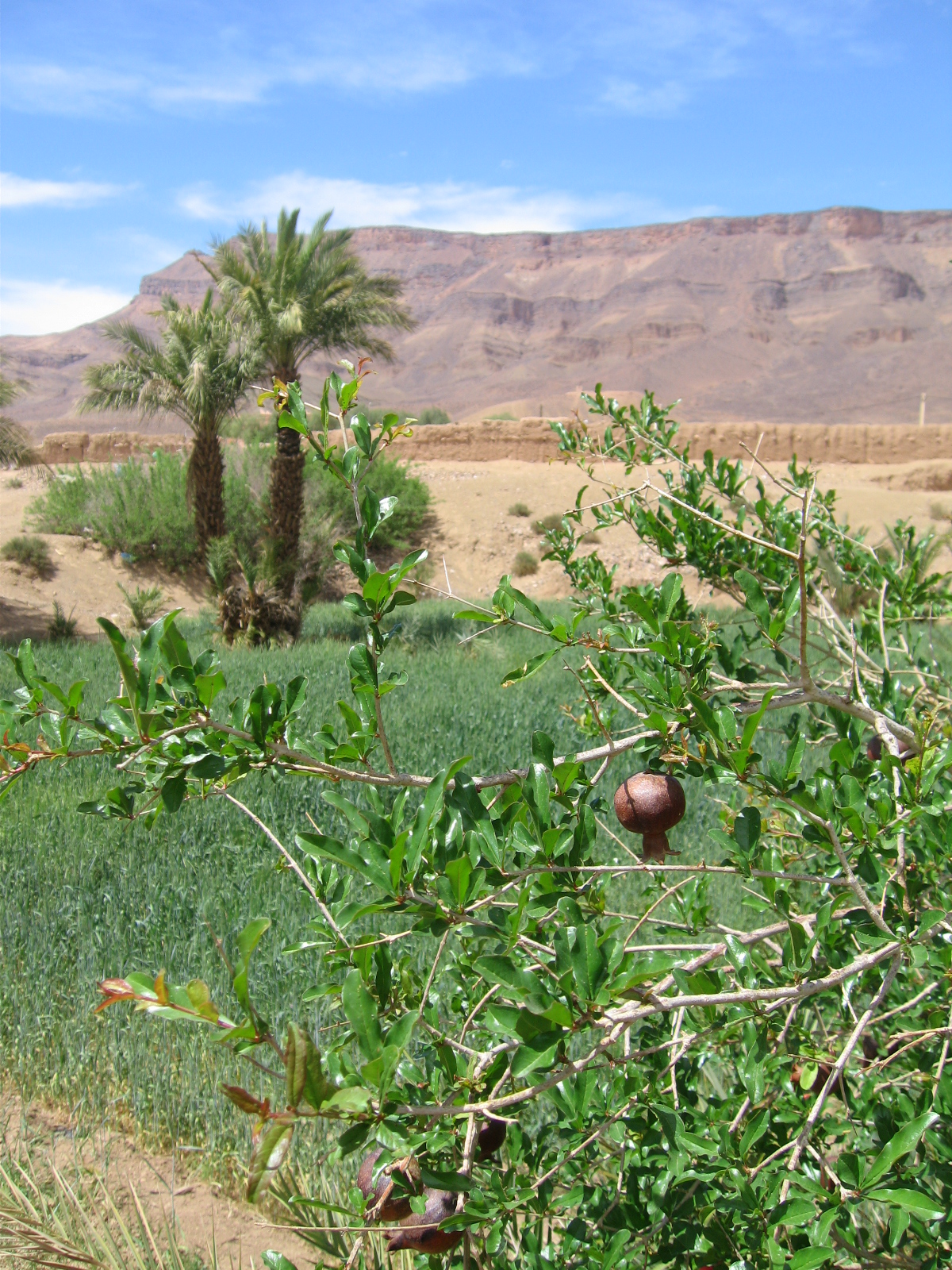
The Draa river supports light agriculture, including the cultivation of pomegranates and dates.

== Language ==
Two languages are spoken in the area: a local variety of Colloquial Arabic which is closely related to Hassaniya, and Shilha or Tashelhiyt, a Berber language.

== Oases ==
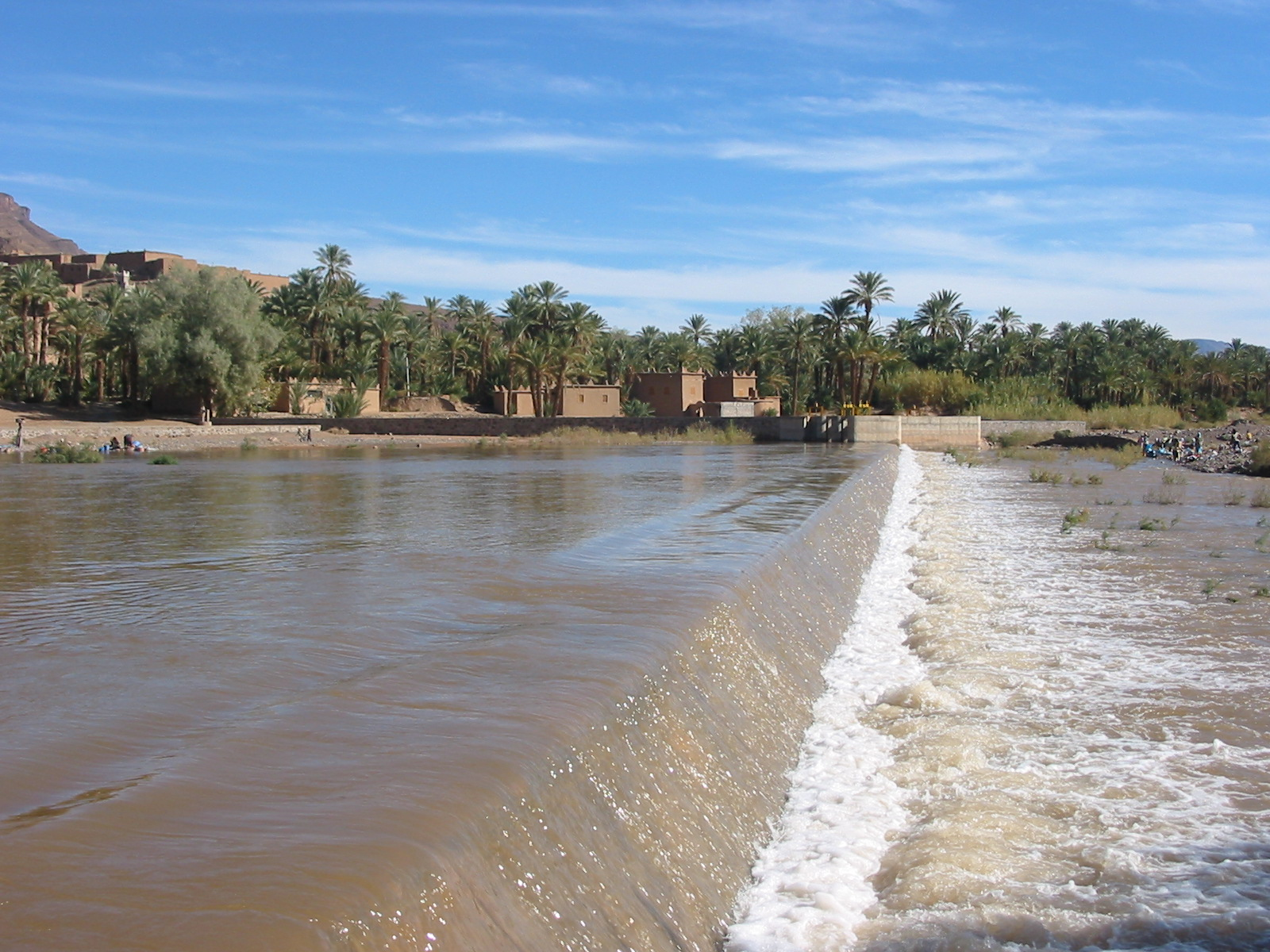
Draa river in Agdz

The Upper Draa River valley, about 200 kilometres (120 mi) long, consists of six stretches of oases/palm groves from north to south:

- The Mezguita oasis, with the Agdz and Auriz and south of it the Tamsikht dam
- The oasis of Tinzouline, with Ouled Lagraier, Tinzouline, Ouled Yaoub and a dam south of it
- The Ternata oasis with Zagora
- The Fezouata oasis with Tamegroute and south of it the Azagha dam
- The Ktaoua oasis (English Ktawa) with Tagounite, Blida, Tiraf and the Bounou dam south of it
- The oasis of Mhamid el Ghuzlan with Mhamid el Ghuzlan

=== Ksour ===
==== in the Mezguita ====
- Ait Abdalah
- Ait Hammou Ou Said*
- Ait Lahcen
- Ait Ouahi
- El Hart
- Irherrhar
- Tamkasselt
- Tiguit
- Zaouit Boulhassane
- Asselim
- Rbat
- Tarmast
- Zaouit n Griourirane
- Aboussas
- Ait Ali
- Ait El Caid El Mir
- Aouriz
- Asselim Izdar
- El Hara
- Ikherazen
- Irhrem Azougarth
- Tafergalt
- Takatert
- Talat
- Talemzit
- Tamnougalt*
- Taourirt Caid Ali
- Zaouit n Sidi Bou Mediane
- Zaouit n Souk
- Ait El Kharj Jdid
- Ait El Kharj Lkdim
- Aramd
- El Borj
- Igamoudene
- Roudat
- Tassoukt

==== in Tinzouline ====
- Akhellouf
- Ez Zourgane
- Bounana
- Ed Dwairat
- Oulad El Megddam
- Oulad Moussa
- Timasla
- Zaouit Timaslas
- Ighrem Tansikht
- Zaouit Ikhf n Ouzrou

==== in Ternata ====
- Beni Khlil*
- Mansouria
- Tiguit Nait Boulman
- Tissergat*
- Amezrou

==== in the Fezouata ====
- Agni
- Agrour
- Ait Aissa ou Brahim
- Ait Beloualid
- Ait Bou Lkhlad
- Arhla ou Drar
- Asrir Nignaoune
- Kasbah Il Mechane
- Izkhnnioun

==== in the Ktaoua/Ktwawa ====
This is the southern stretch of the valley between the Azagha and the Bounou dam near Tagounite. There are 55 villages, mostly consisting of ksour (plural of ksar):

- Centre Tagounite
- Bani Sbih
- Zaouia Sidi Salah
- Nesrate
- Kser Tiraf
- Ait Gazzou
- Bani Hayoune
- Ouled Amer
- Knazta
- Tabourite
- Bani Mhamed
- Khassouane
- Adouafil
- Zaouia Jdid Zrahna
- Ait Rbaa
- Gourguir
- Kasbat Aamamou
- Bani Semguine
- Ksar Hammad Tahr
- Ouled Youssef Drawa
- Loughlade
- Ouled Ali
- Regba
- Bani Hnit
- Zaouia Moulay Chrif Tahtania
- Blida centre
- Ksebt Ramla
- Takchourte
- Ksar Bani Mhammed
- Ksar Lakbir
- Ksar Jdid Zrahna
- Ksar Jdid Ignaoun
- Bani Skouken
- Zte. Sidi Yahya
- Ait Ali Ignaoun
- Zaouia Moulay Chrif Foukania
- Zaouia Koudia
- Taarchate
- Ait Boutbratine
- Zaouia Lansar
- Zaouia Dakhlania Zhahna
- Ait Zemrou
- Ksebat Nani
- Ksar Aarib
- Ouled Youssef Ait Isfoul
- Zaouia Sidi Madani
- Zaouia Dakhlania
- Ait Talaarifte
- Ait Aissa Obrahim
- Najia
- Ksar Ait Rardi
- Ait Boumhamed
- Ikddarne
- Tahramet
- Bnou Khettal

Source : Recensement général du Maroc, 1994 (Recensement général de la population et de l'habitat (RGPH, Haut-Commissariat au Plan du Royaume du Maroc (HCP), septembre 1994)).

== Exploration ==
The Draa has attracted the attention of a number of notable explorers including Frenchman Charles de Foucauld who travelled throughout Morocco disguised as a Jewish merchant in the 1800s, and Jeffrey Tayler who wrote a book about his experiences.

== Bibliography ==
- Bahani, A., La nouba d'eau et son évolution dans les palmeraies du Draa Moyen du Maroc: CERES. Les oasis du Maghreb, Tunis: pp. 107–126, 1994
- Philip Curtin (ed.), African History, London: Longman, 1988
- M. Elfasi (ed.), General History of Africa III, Africa from the Seventh to the 11th century, UNESCO, 1988
- Charles de Foucauld, Reconnaissance au Maroc, 1888, 1 vol. in -4 and atlas
- Hammoudi, A., Substance and Relation: Water Rights and Water Distribution in the Dra Valley. In: Mayer, A.E. (Ed.), Property, Social Structure, and law in the Modern Middle East. New York: pp. 27–57, 1985
- Marmol Caravajal, Africa, 1667 3 vol. in 4
- Thomas Pellow; Josephine Grieder, The History of the long captivity and adventures of Thomas Pellow, in South-Barbary : [written by himself], 1973 (repr.of the 1739 edition with a new introd. for the Garland ed. by Josephine Grieder) ISBN 0-8240-0583-X
- W.D. Seiwert (ed.), Maurische Chronik, München: Trickster Verlag, 1988
- Jacques-Meunié, D., Le Maroc Saharien, des origines à 1670. Thèse d'État. 2 tomes, Librairie Klincksieck, Paris, 1982
- G. Spillmann, Villes et Tribus du Maroc vol. IX, Tribus Berbères Tome II, Districts et Tribus de la Haute Vallée du Dra, Paris, 1931
- Jeffrey Tayler, Valley of the Casbahs, 2004
- Ahmed Zainabi, La Vallée du Dra: Développement Alternatif et Action Communautaire, 2001 (Background paper WDR 2003)
