= Jeffrey Tayler =

American author and journalist

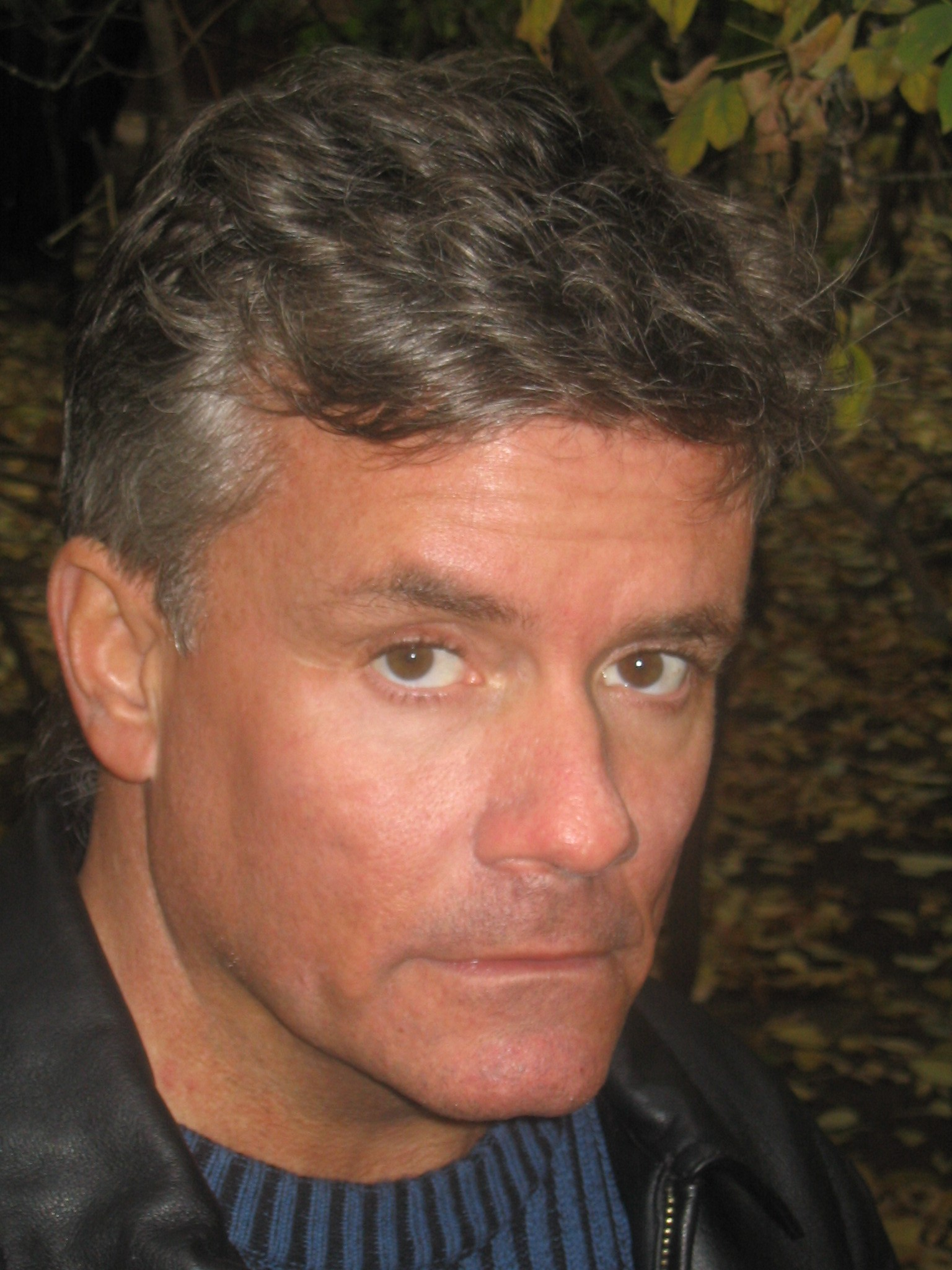
- Occupation: Journalist
- Writing career
- Language: English

Jeffrey Tayler is a U.S.-born author and journalist. He is the Russia correspondent for the Atlantic Monthly and a contributor to several other magazines as well as to NPR's All Things Considered. He has written several non-fiction books about different regions of the world which include Facing the Congo, Siberian Dawn, Glory in a Camel's Eye, and Angry Wind, the latter being a portrait of a journey through the Muslim portion of black Africa. River of no Reprieve is about a challenging raft trip down Russia's Lena River. Tayler holds both a Bachelor of Arts degree from Syracuse University, and a Master of Arts degree from the University of Virginia.

Tayler is an accomplished polyglot; in addition to his native English, he is fluent in Russian, Arabic, French, and modern Greek, and has a functioning knowledge of Spanish and Turkish.

He served as a Peace Corps volunteer in Morocco from 1988 to 1990.

Since the summer of 1993, he has lived in Moscow.

== Bibliography ==
- Siberian Dawn: A Journey Across the New Russia (2000)
- Facing the Congo: A Modern-Day Journey into the Heart of Darkness (2000)
- Valley of the Casbahs: A Journey Across the Moroccan Sahara (2003)
- Glory in a Camel's Eye: A Perilous Trek Through the Greatest African Desert (2003)
- Angry Wind: Through Muslim Black Africa by Truck, Bus, Boat, and Camel (2005) (also published as The Lost Kingdoms of Africa)
- River of White Nights: A Siberian Odyssey (2006)
- River of No Reprieve: Descending Siberia's Waterway of Exile, Death, and Destiny (2006)
- Murderers in Mausoleums: Riding the Back Roads of Empire Between Moscow and Beijing (2009) (also published as In The Bloody Footsteps Of Ghengis Khan: An Epic Journey Across the Steppes, Mountains and Deserts from Red Square to Tiananmen Square)
- Topless Jihadis: Inside Femen, the World’s Most Provocative Activist Group (2013)
- In Putin's Footsteps: Searching for the Soul of an Empire Across Russia's Eleven Time Zones (2019), with Nina Khrushcheva
