= Agdz =

Agdz / Agdez ⴰⴳⴷⵣ / أگدز
- City
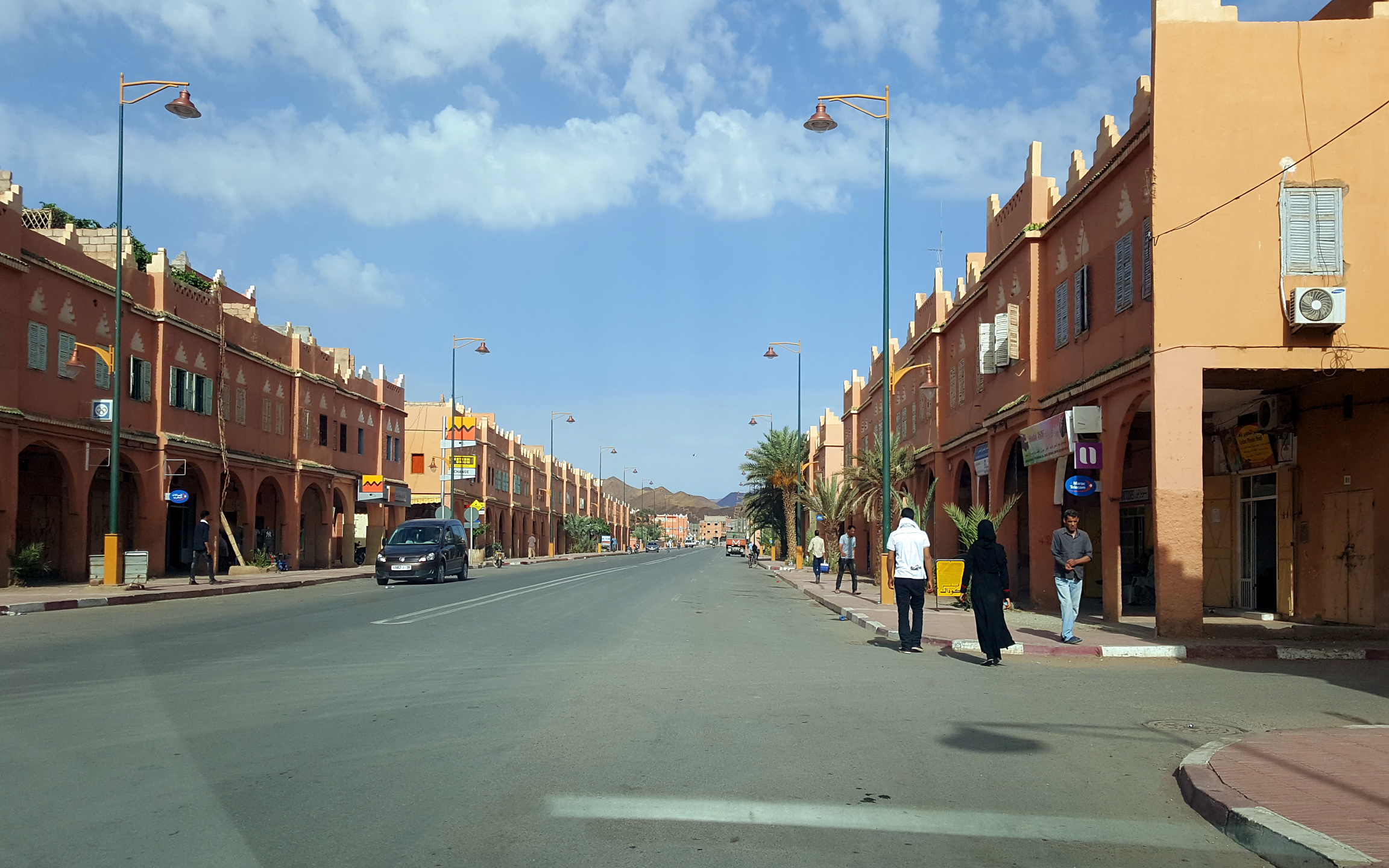
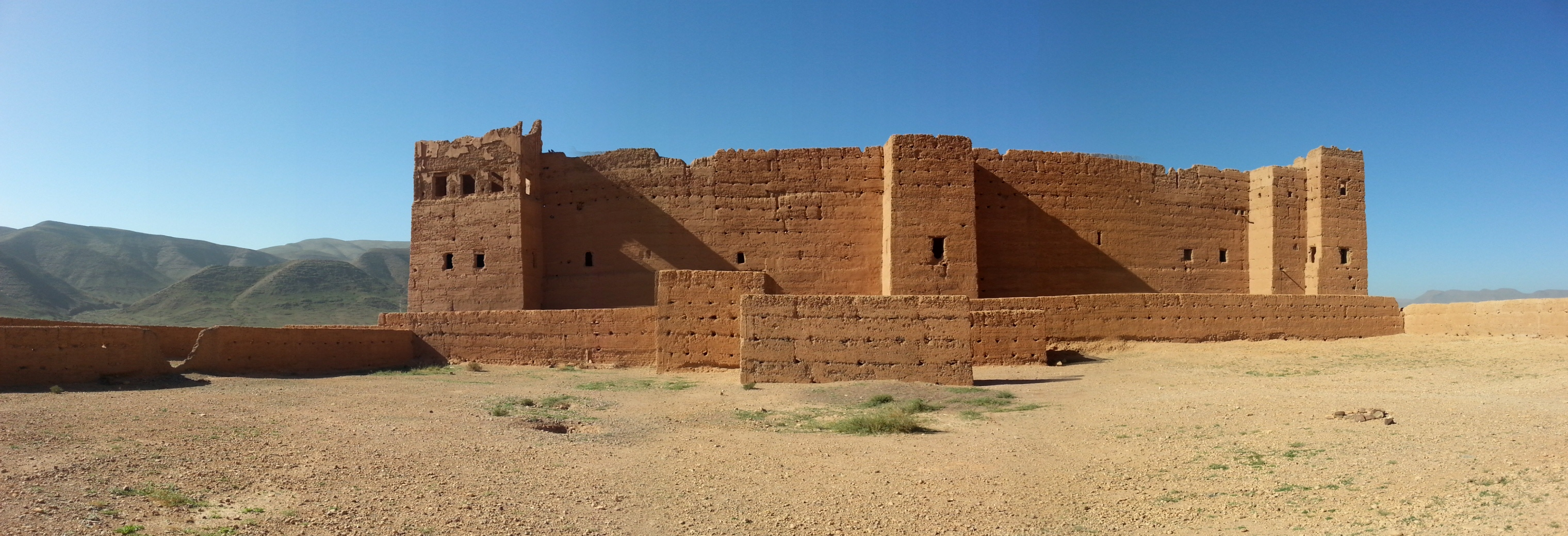
- Interactive map of Agdz / Agdez
- Coordinates: 30°41′52″N 6°26′59″W
- Country: Morocco
- Region: Drâa-Tafilalet
- Province: Zagora

Agdz, also spelled Agdez (Tachelhit: ⴰⴳⴷⵣ, Arabic: أگدز) is a Moroccan town in Zagora Province with a population of about 10,000. Agdz lies at the feet of Djebel Kissane and along the shores of the Draa River.

== Etymology ==
The name means market in Tamazight, typically referring to a weekly rural market.

== Geography ==
Agdz is located about 65 kilometres (40 mi) south of Ouarzazate and 92 km (57 mi) north of Zagora. Agdz is located along the old caravan route linking Marrakesh to Timbuktu, and played an important role in the exchange of goods across the Sahara.

In geographic terms, the most predominant feature of Agdz is Jebel Kissane which is in the middle of the Draa Valley to the east of Agdz. Kissane means 'glasses' in Arabic and the jebel is so named because it looks like glasses of tea behind a tea pot.

== History ==
The years of 1970 and 1980 were hard on the agricultural sector due to droughts.

== Features ==
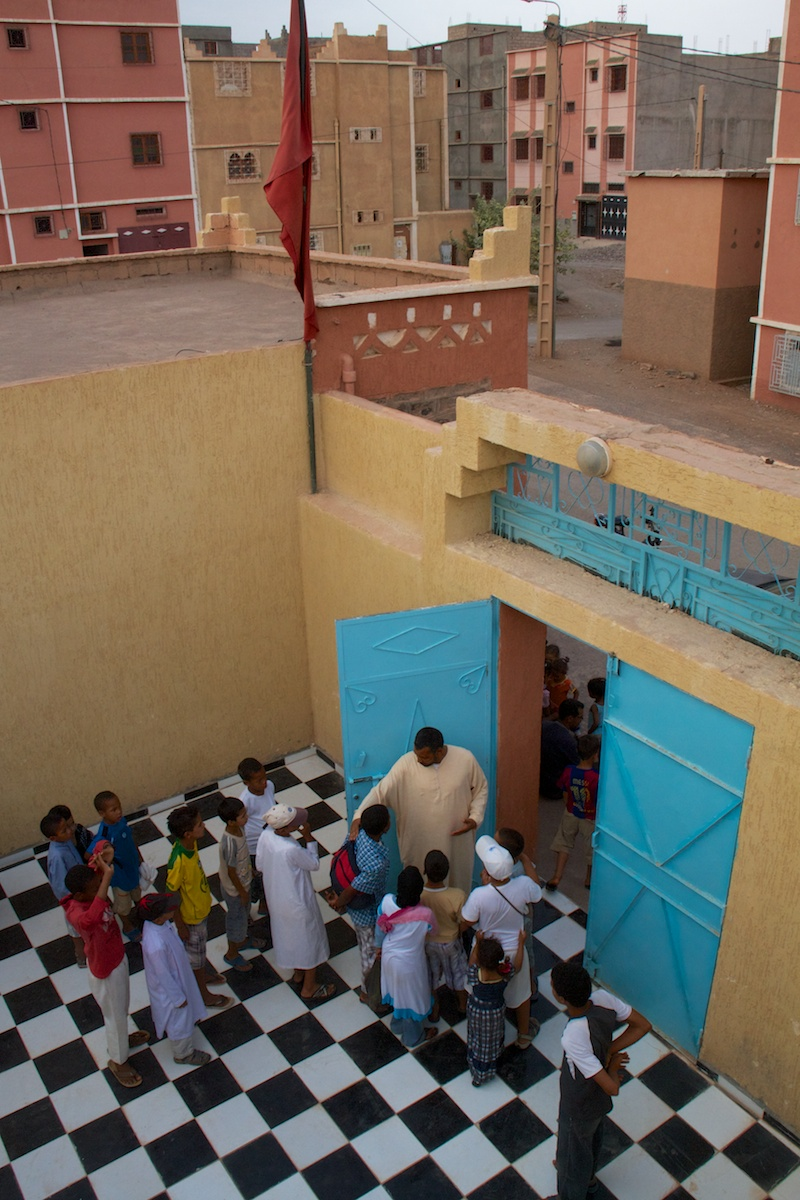
Dar Chebab Mohamed Ezzarktouni in Agdz

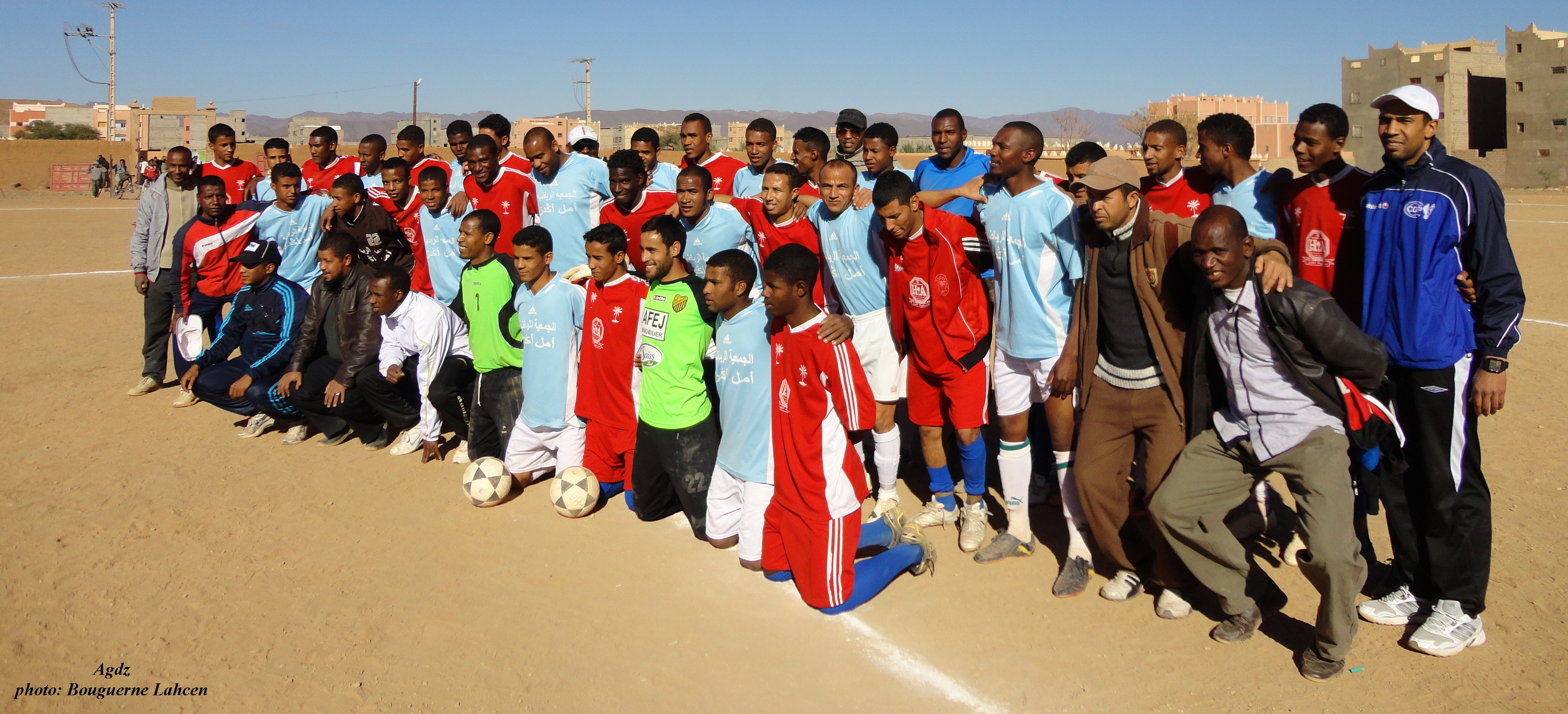
Agdz has two football (soccer) clubs

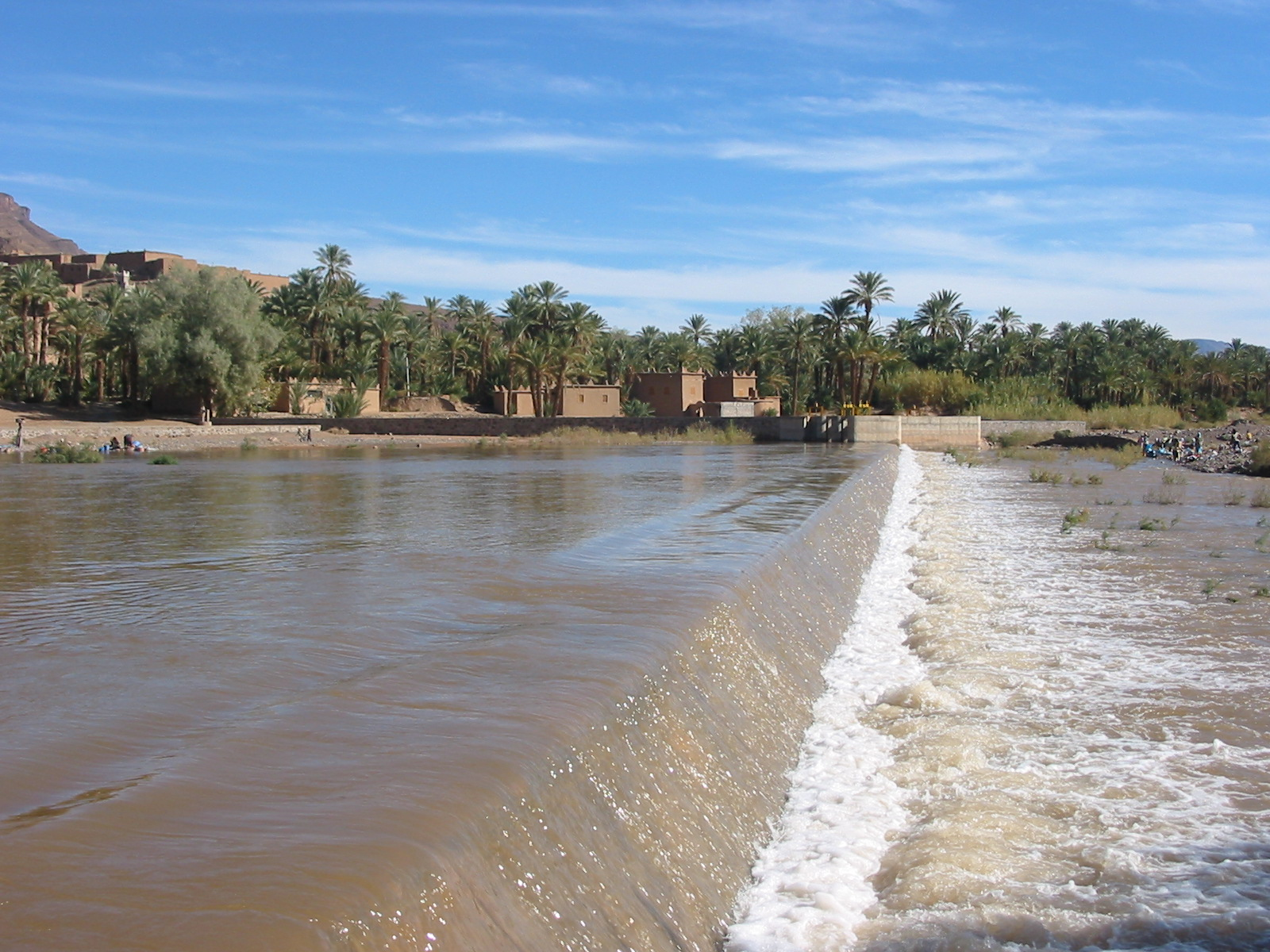
Draa River in Agdz

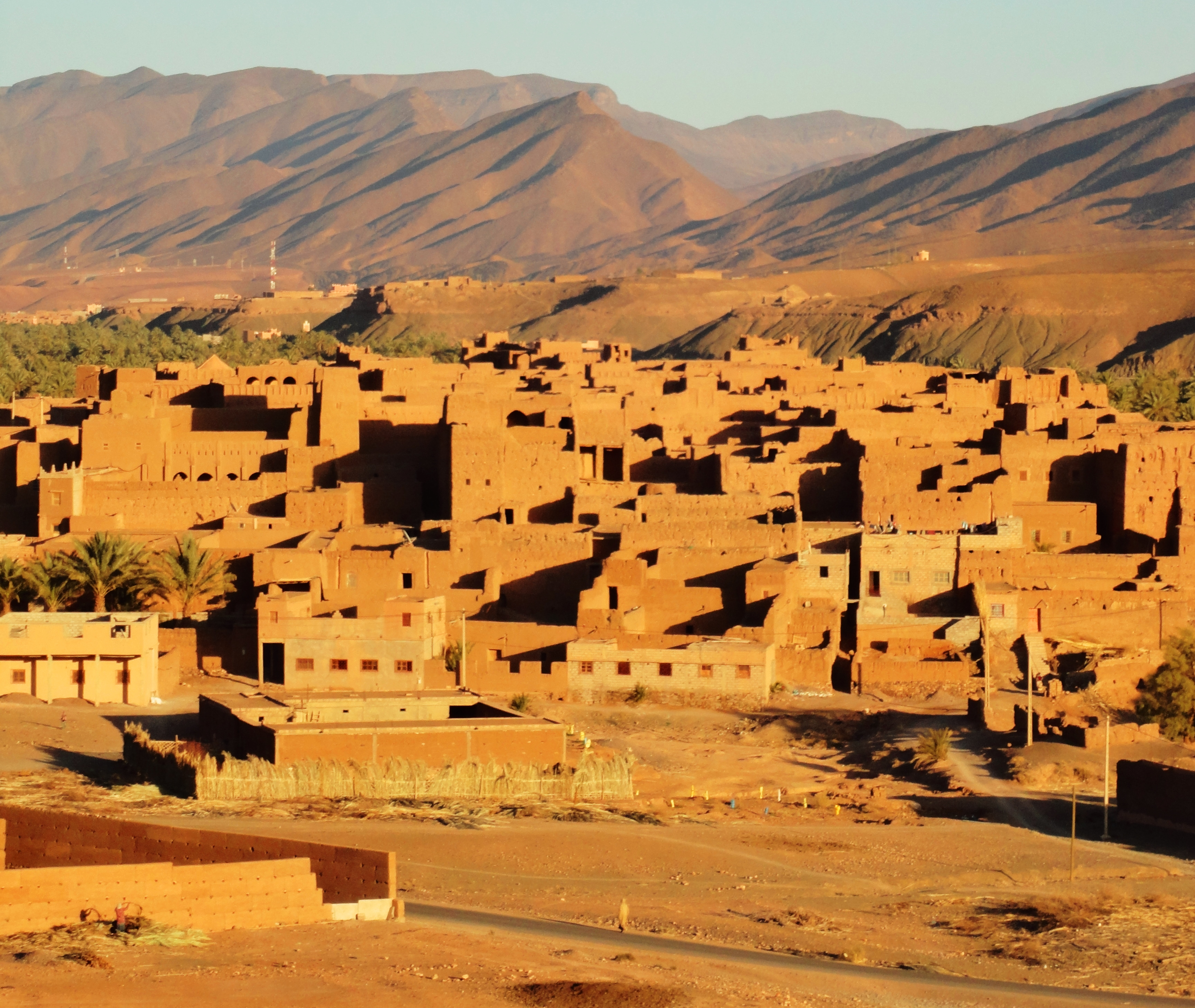
Ksar of Tamnougalte

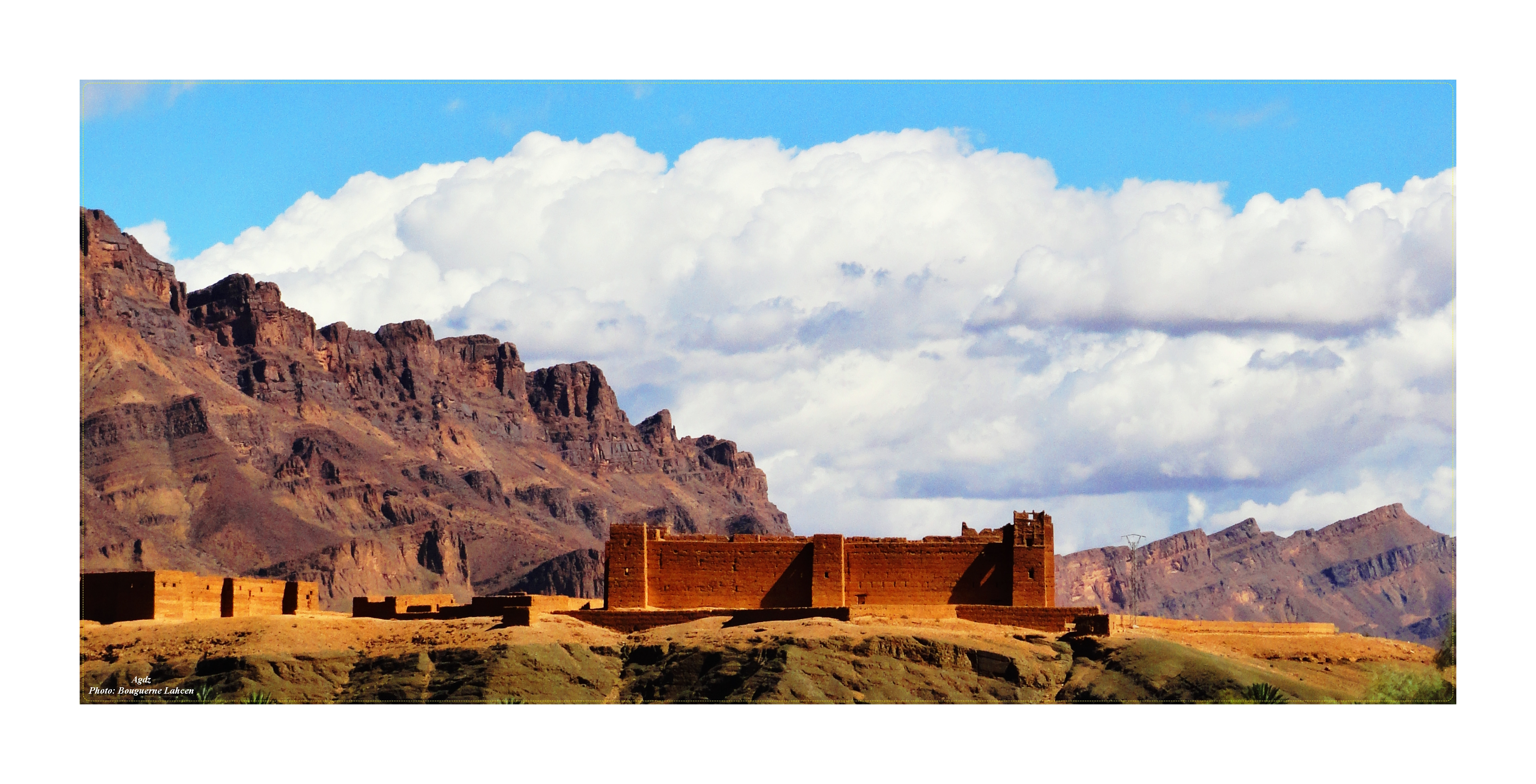
Casbah of Tamnougalte

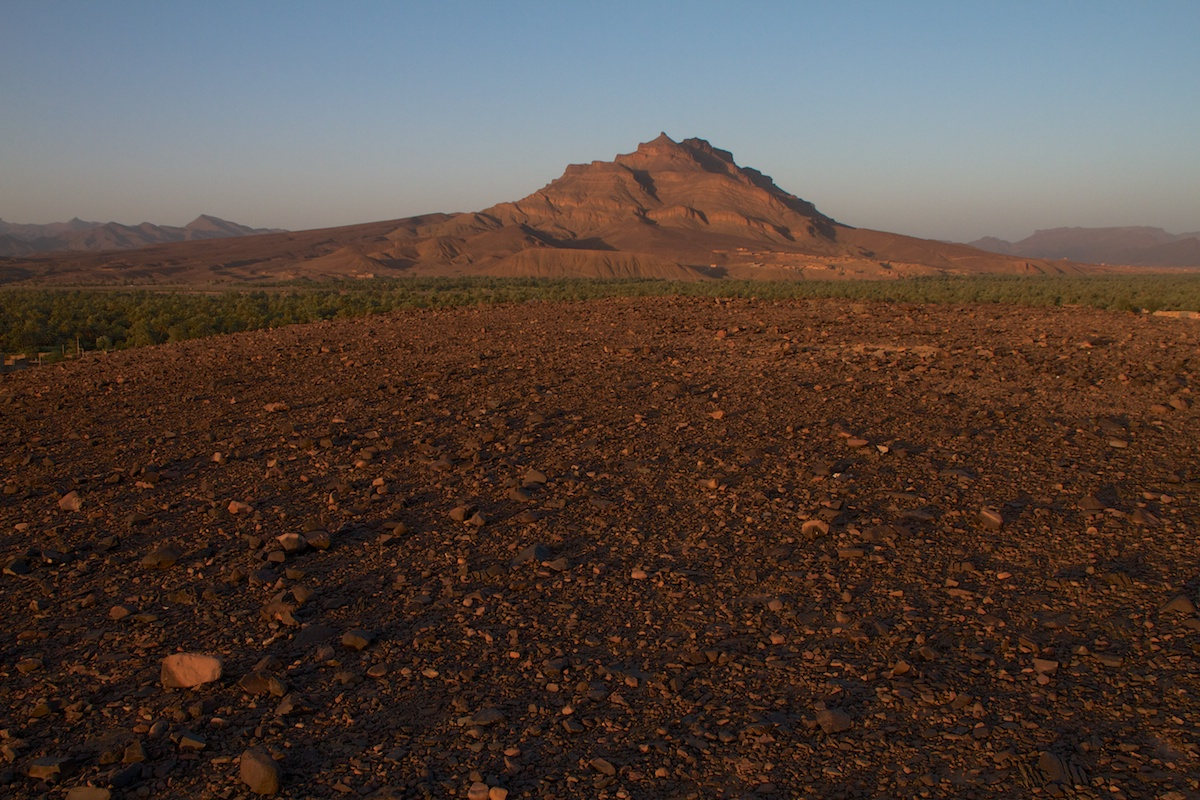
Summer solstice 20 June 2012 looking east at Jebel Kissane in Agdz

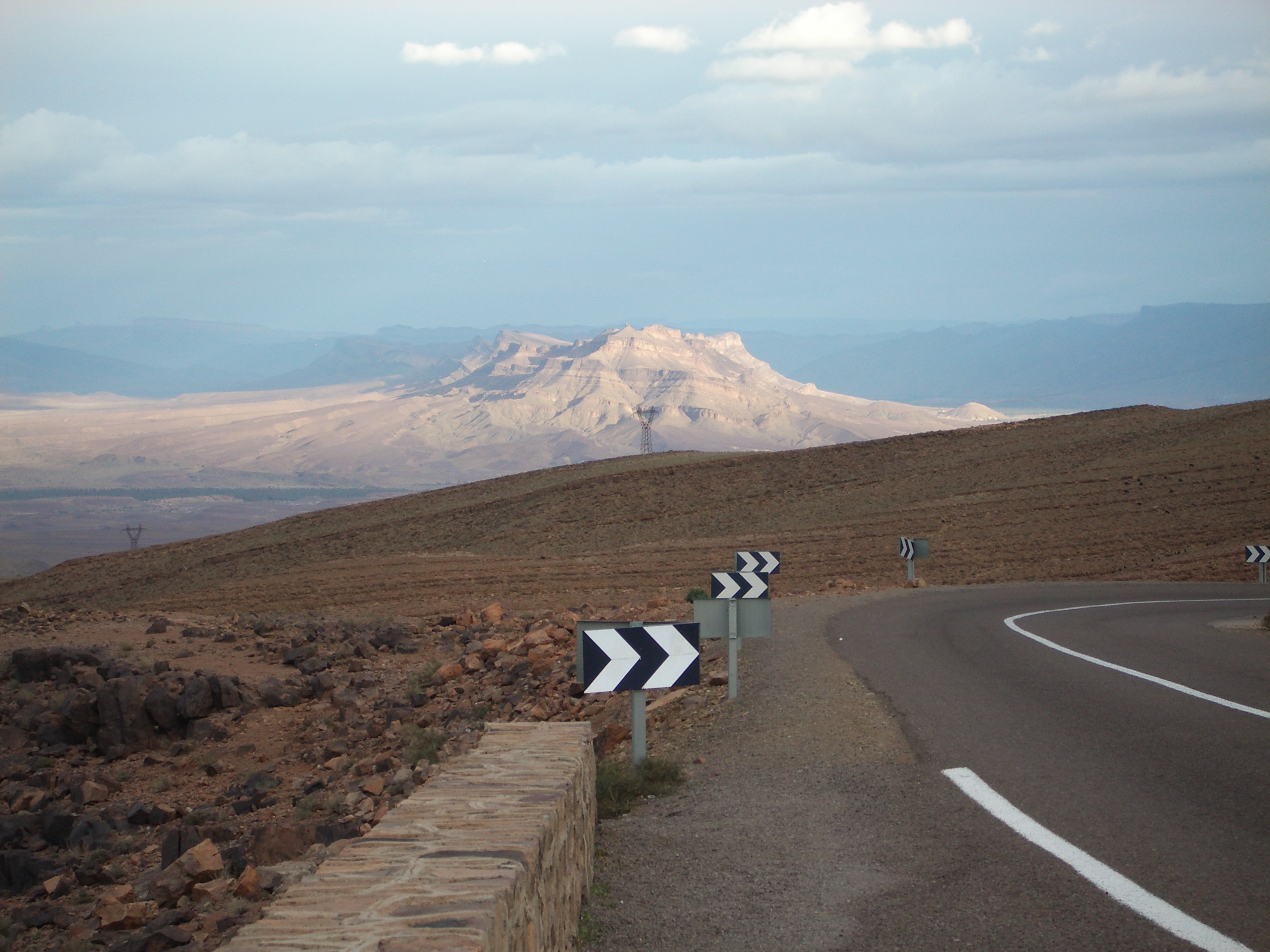
View of Jebel Kissane

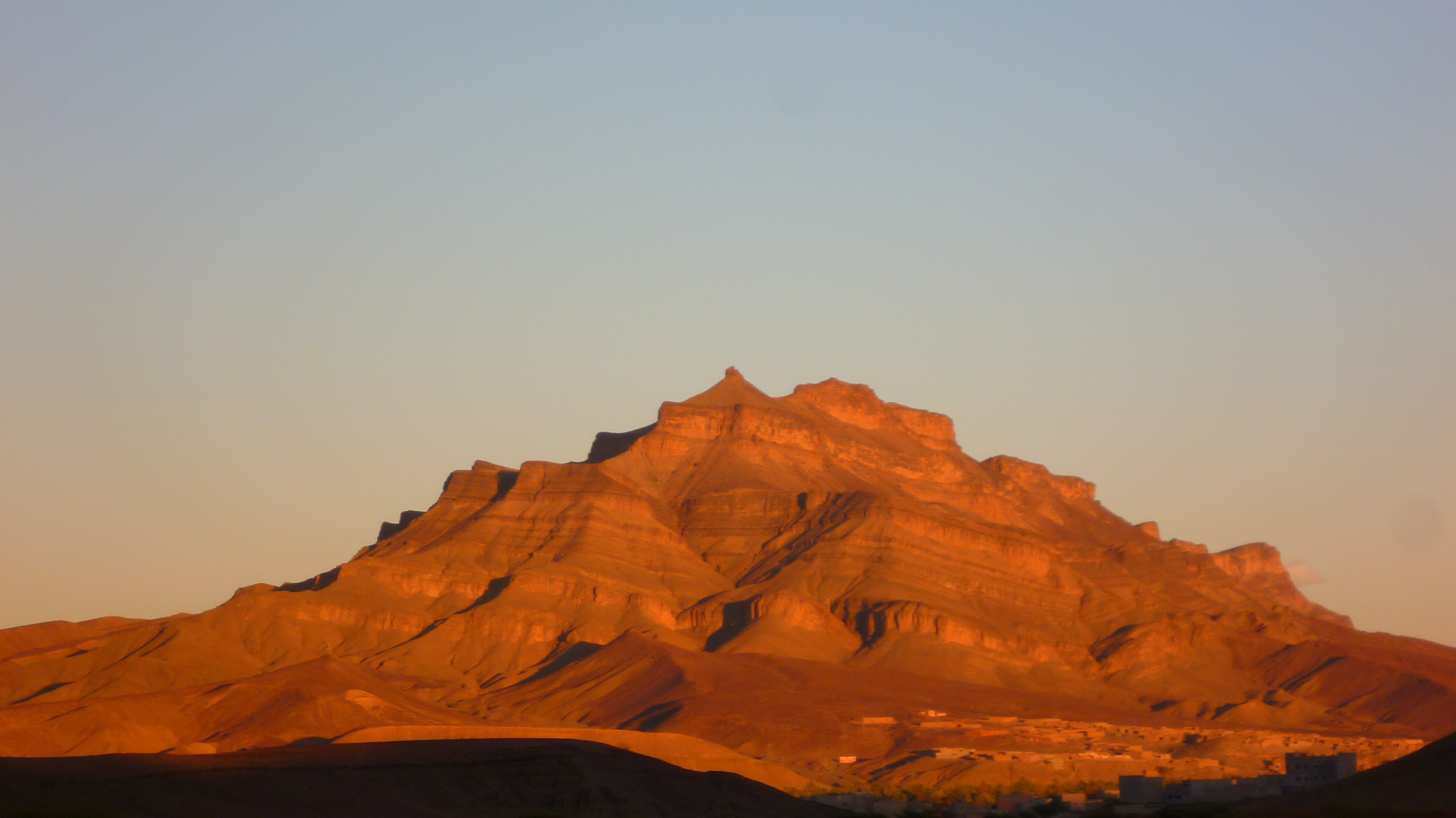
View of Jebel Kissane
