= Moroccan American League =

The Moroccan American League is a Moroccan cultural association in America.

== See also ==
- Moroccan American Chamber of Commerce
