= Heraclius (disambiguation) =

Heraclius (c. 575–641) was the Byzantine emperor from 610 to 641.

Heraclius may also refer to:

- Antipope Heraclius (fl. 309–310), antipope to Pope Eusebius
- Heraclius the Cynic (fl. 360s), Roman philosopher
- Heraclius (primicerius sacri cubiculi) (died 455), courtier of Emperor Valentinian III
- Heraclius of Edessa (d. 474), Byzantine general
- Heraclius, Bishop of Angoulême (d. 580)
- Heraclius the Elder (fl. 580s–610s), Armenian-born Byzantine general and exarch of Africa
- Heraclius Constantine (612–641), or Constantine III, Byzantine emperor in 641
- Heraclius, better known as Heraclonas (626–642), Byzantine emperor in 641
- Heraclius Constantine, better known as Constans II (630–668), Byzantine emperor from 641 to 668
- Heraclius (son of Constans II), Byzantine co-emperor from 659 to 681
- Heraclius (son of Constantine IV), Byzantine prince
- Heraclius (brother of Tiberius III) (fl. 698–705), Byzantine general
- Heraclius of Jerusalem (c. 1128–1190/1191), religious leader
- Heraclius I of Kakheti (1642–1709), Georgian king
- Heraclius II of Georgia (1720/1721–1798), Georgian king
- Heraclius Djabadary (1891 – 1937), Georgian classical composer

== See also ==
- Heraclitus (disambiguation)
