= Diocese of Angoulême =

Catholic diocese in France

Diocese of Angoulême Dioecesis Engolismensis Diocèse d'Angoulême

Catholic
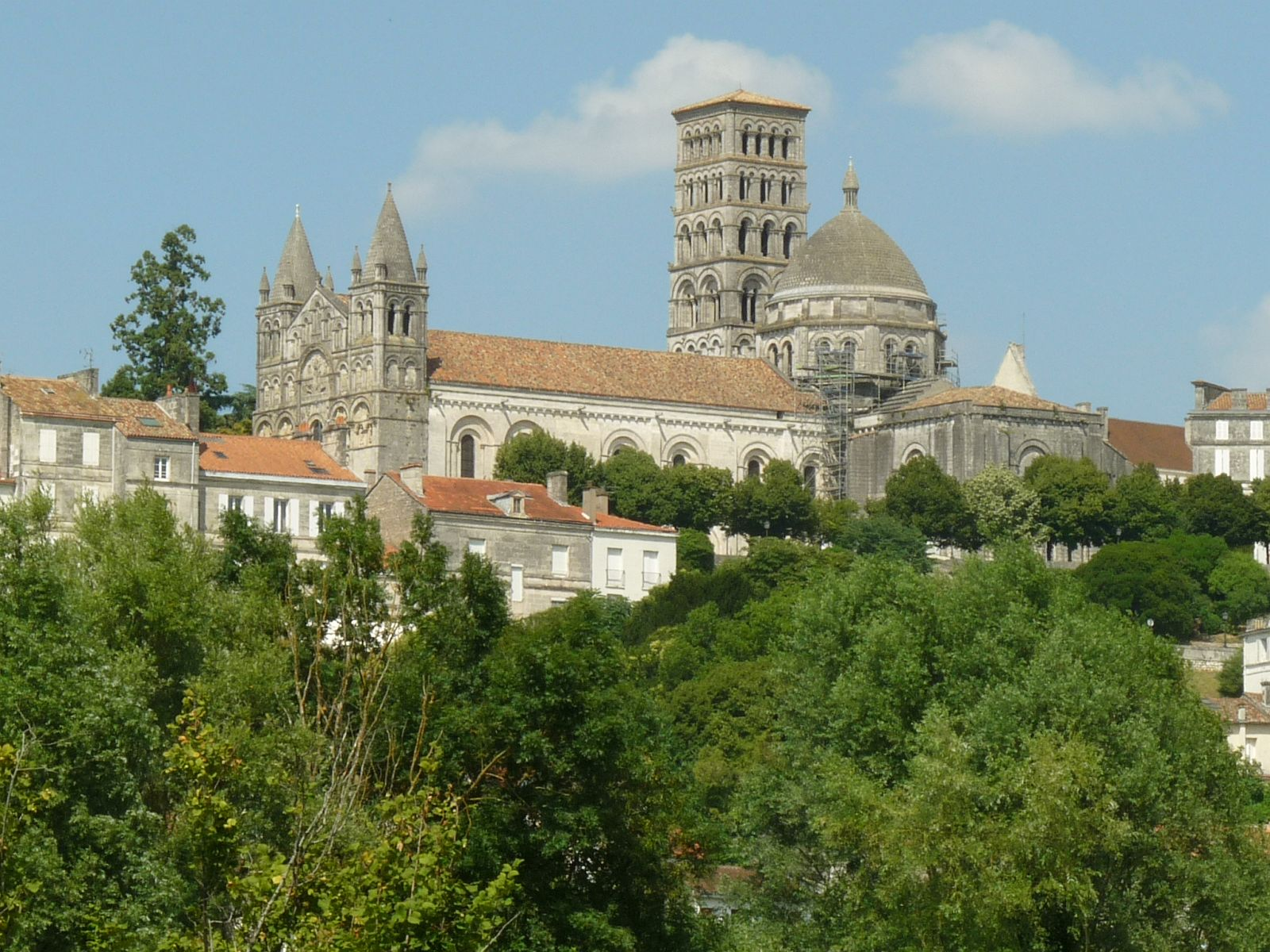
- Angoulême Cathedral

Location
- Country: France
- Ecclesiastical province: Poitiers
- Metropolitan: Archdiocese of Poitiers
- Coordinates: 45.65°N 0.15°E

Statistics
- Area: 5,972 km^{2} (2,306 sq mi)
- Population: Total; Catholics: (as of 2022); 352,015 (est.); 269,000 (est.) (76.4%)
- Parishes: 29

Information
- Denomination: Roman Catholic
- Sui iuris church: Latin Church
- Rite: Roman Rite
- Established: 3rd Century
- Cathedral: Cathedral of St. Peter in Angoulême
- Patron saint: Saint Ausonius of Angoulême; Saint Cybard
- Secular priests: 46 (Diocesan); 8 (Religious Orders); 13 Permanent Deacons

Current leadership
- Pope: Leo XIV
- Bishop: Hervé Gosselin
- Metropolitan Archbishop: Jérôme Daniel Beau
- Bishops emeritus: Claude Dagens

Map

Website
- Website of the Diocese

The Diocese of Angoulême (Latin: Dioecesis Engolismensis; French: Diocèse d'Angoulême) is a Latin diocese of the Catholic Church in France. Originally erected in the 3rd century, the episcopal see is the Angoulême Cathedral. Comprising the département of the Charente, the diocese had traditionally been suffragan to the Archbishopric of Bordeaux, under the old régime as well as under the Concordat, but since 2002 is suffragan to the Archdiocese of Poitiers.

In 2022, in the Diocese of Angoulême there was one priest for every 4,981 Catholics.

== History ==
Its first bishop was Ausonius, a disciple, it is said, of Saint Martial. According to Gregory of Tours Martial preached the gospel in Limoges about the year 250; the Limousin traditions, as set down by the chronicler Adhémar de Chabannes, maintain that Martial was the immediate disciple of Saint Peter. According to the latter opinion St. Ausonius was a bishop of the first century; according to the former, of the third century. At least one modern historian believes it likely that Ausonius lived even later, in the 4th century. His cult, however, does not appear until the end of the tenth century.

The Gallia Christiana lists St. Salvius, honoured as a martyr at Valenciennes, as a Bishop of Angoulême. The 1913 Catholic Encyclopedia, however, considers him to have been only a missionary bishop of the eighth century. In the list of the Bishops of Angoulême is found the name of the poet Octavien de St. Gelais (1494–1502).

The religious monuments of the province of Angoumois are remarkable for their admirable Romano-Byzantine façades. The most beautiful of them is St. Peter's Cathedral at Angoulême. The original cathedral was dedicated to Saint Saturninus, but it was destroyed by the Arian Visigoths. After the defeat of Alaric II in 507, King Clovis had his chaplain Aptonius made bishop and had the cathedral rebuilt and named in honor of Saint Peter. It was consecrated around 570, according to tradition by Saint Germain, Bishop of Paris. The cathedral was ravaged again, this time by the Normans, in the middle of the ninth century. It was rebuilt by Bishop Grimoard and dedicated in 1017. The present edifice is the work of Bishop Gérard II de Blaye, the Papal Legate, ca. 1109–1120. The cathedral was administered by a Chapter, composed of a Dean, the Archdeacon, the Treasurer, and twenty-one Canons. There were also a Cantor and Scholasticus, but they did not have a vote in Chapter unless they were also Canons.

The memory of a wealthy and famous Augustinian abbey, founded in 1122, is kept alive by its ruins at Couronne, near Angoulême.

In 1236, the Jewish community of Angouleme, along with those in Anjou, Poitou, and Bordeaux, was attacked by crusaders. 500 Jews from these communities chose conversion and over 3000 were massacred. Pope Gregory IX, who originally had called the crusade, was outraged about this brutality and criticized the clergy of the diocese of Angoulême for not preventing it.

== Bishops of Angoulême ==
=== to 1000 ===
- Ausonius (4th century)
- Dynamius (before 431–451 or later)
- Lupicinus (511 or before – 541 or later)
- Aptonius (542–566)
- Maracharius or Mererius (567–573)
- Frontonius (573–574)
- Heraclius (c. 574–c. 580)
- Nicasius (before 584–c. 590 or after)
- Bassolus (614)
- Namatius (626/627–637)
- Ebargehenus (mid 7th century)
- Tomanius (662/675–677)
- Ardoin (late 7th century – early 8th)
- Sidranius (first half of the 9th century)
- Fredebert (835)
- Launus (848 – January 25, 861 or 862)
- Helias Scotigena (862–c. 875)
- Oliba (c. 875 – September 3, 892)
- Anatolius (892 – March or April 895)
- Gombaud (March 2, 897 – March 23, 940)
- Fulk (January 938 – February 951)
- Eblo (April 2, 951 – January 18, 964)
- Ramnulf (February or April 963 – January 973)
- Hugh of Jarnac (973–990)
- Grimoard of Mussidan (September 22, 991 – January 28, 1018)

=== 1000 to 1300 ===
- Roho of Montaigu (c. 1020 – March 12 between 1032 and 1036)
- Gerald Malart (1037 or before – June 15, 1043)
- William Taillefer (1043 – September 20, 1075 or 1076)
- Adémar Taillefer (May 15, 1075 – September 4, 1101)
- Gerard (1101 or 1102 – March 1, 1136)
- Lambert (May 24, 1136 – June 13, 1149)
- Hugh Tison of La Rochefoucauld (June 11, 1149 – August 12, 1159)
- Peter Titmond (1159–1182)
- John of Saint-Val (1181–March 7, 1204)
- William Testaud (1206–1227)
- John Guillot (1228–c. 1238)
- Radulfus (c. 1240–1247)
- Peter (1247–1252)
- Robert of Montbron (1252–1268)
- sede vacante (1268–1272)
- Peter Raymond (1272–1273)
- William of Blaye (October 12, 1273 – 1307)

=== 1300 to 1500 ===
- Fulques de la Rochefoucauld (1308–1313)
- Olivier (1313–1315)
- John III (1315–1317)
- Galhardus of Fougères (1318–1328)
- Ayquelin of Blaye (1328–1363)
- Helias of Pons (1363–1381)
- Joannes Bertetus, O.P. (20 June 1380 – 1384) (Avignon Obedience)
- Galhardus (25 October 1384 – 1391) (Avignon Obedience)
- Guillelmus, O.S.B. (5 April 1391 – 1412) (Avignon Obedience)
- Joannes Floridus (Fleury), O.Cist. (31 August 1412 – 13 July 1431)
- Robertus de Montebruno (8 August 1431 – 24 July 1465)
- Geoffroy de Pompadour (24 July 1465 – 6 July 1470)
- Radulfus du Faou (6 July 1470 – 22 November 1479)
- Robert de Luxembourg (15 November 1479 – 1493)
- Octavien de St. Gelais (18 October 1493 appointed – 1502 died)

=== 1500 to 1800 ===
- Hugues de Bauza (11 January 1503 – 1505)
- Antoine d’Estaing (September 16, 1506 appointed – February 28, 1523 died)
- Antoine de La Barre (January 14, 1524 appointed – 16 March 1528)
- Jacques Babou (16 March 1528 – 26 November 1532)
- Philibert Babou de La Bourdaisière (13 January 1533 – 4 June 1567 resigned)
- Charles de Bony (4 June 1567 appointed— 14 December 1603 died)
- Antoine de la Rochefoucauld (13 August 1607 – 1635)
- Jacques Le Noël du Perron (28 January 1636 – 24 August 1646)
- François de Péricard (18 February 1647 – September 29, 1689 died)
- Cyprien-Gabriel Bénard de Résay (March 10, 1692 confirmed – January 5, 1737 died)
- François du Verdier (December 16, 1737 appointed – September 21, 1753 died)
- Joseph-Amédée de Broglie (February 11, 1754 appointed – 1784 died)
- Philippe-François d’Albignac de Castelnau (June 25, 1784 appointed – 1806 died)
  - Pierre-Mathieu Joubert (6 March 1791 elected – 26 December 1792 resigned) (Constitutional Bishop)

=== since 1802 ===
- Dominique Lacombe (April 11, 1802 appointed – April 7, 1823 died)
- Jean-Joseph-Pierre Guigou (September 10, 1823 appointed – May 21, 1842 died)
- René-François Régnier (June 15, 1842 appointed – May 16, 1850 appointed Archbishop of Cambrai)
- Antoine-Charles Cousseau (June 17, 1850 appointed – August 12, 1872 resigned)
- Alexandre-Léopold Sebaux (December 16, 1872 appointed – May 17, 1891 died)
- Jean-Baptiste Frérot (April 2, 1892 appointed – September 6, 1899 died)
- Jean Louis Mando (December 7, 1899 appointed – July 24, 1900 died)
- Joseph-François-Ernest Ricard (April 7, 1901 appointed – April 15, 1907 appointed Archbishop of Auch)
- Henri-Marie Arlet (August 7, 1907 appointed – May 15, 1933 died)
- Jean-Baptiste Mégnin (December 7, 1933 appointed – May 9, 1965 died)
- René-Noël-Joseph Kérautret (May 9, 1965 succeeded – July 1, 1975 resigned)
- Georges Rol (July 1, 1975 succeeded – Dec 22, 1993 resigned)
- Claude Jean Pierre Dagens (December 22, 1993 succeeded – November 9, 2015) (fr)
- Herve Gosselin (November 9, 2015 - )

== See also ==
- Catholic Church in France
- List of Catholic dioceses in France

== Sources ==
- Cheney, David M., Catholic-Hierarchy.org, "Diocese of Angoulême: Past and Present Ordinaries." Accessed May 26, 2014. http://www.catholic-hierarchy.org/diocese/dango.html ^{[self-published]}
- Debord, André. La société laïque dans les pays de la Charente, Xe-XIIe s. Paris: Picard, 1984.
- Eubel, Conradus, ed. (1913). Hierarchia catholica, Tomus 1 (second ed.). Münster: Libreria Regensbergiana. (in Latin)
- Eubel, Conradus, ed. (1914). Hierarchia catholica, Tomus 2 (second ed.). Münster: Libreria Regensbergiana. (in Latin)
- Gulik, Guilelmus (1923). Eubel, Conradus (ed.). Hierarchia catholica, Tomus 3 (second ed.). Münster: Libreria Regensbergiana.
- Favreau, Robert. "Évêques d’Angoulême et Saintes avant 1200." Revue historique du Centre-Ouest 9, no. 1 (2010): 7–142.
- Gauchat, Patritius (Patrice) (1935). Hierarchia catholica IV (1592-1667). Münster: Libraria Regensbergiana.
- Ritzler, Remigius; Sefrin, Pirminus (1952). Hierarchia catholica medii et recentis aevi V (1667-1730). Patavii: Messagero di S. Antonio.
- Ritzler, Remigius; Sefrin, Pirminus (1958). Hierarchia catholica medii et recentis aevi VI (1730-1799). Patavii: Messagero di S. Antonio.
- Ritzler, Remigius; Sefrin, Pirminus (1968). Hierarchia Catholica medii et recentioris aevi sive summorum pontificum, S. R. E. cardinalium, ecclesiarum antistitum series... A pontificatu Pii PP. VII (1800) usque ad pontificatum Gregorii PP. XVI (1846) (in Latin). Vol. VII. Monasterii: Libr. Regensburgiana.
- Remigius Ritzler; Pirminus Sefrin (1978). Hierarchia catholica Medii et recentioris aevi... A Pontificatu PII PP. IX (1846) usque ad Pontificatum Leonis PP. XIII (1903) (in Latin). Vol. VIII. Il Messaggero di S. Antonio.
- Pięta, Zenon (2002). Hierarchia catholica medii et recentioris aevi... A pontificatu Pii PP. X (1903) usque ad pontificatum Benedictii PP. XV (1922) (in Latin). Vol. IX. Padua: Messagero di San Antonio. ISBN 978-88-250-1000-8.
- Pertz, Georgius Henricus, ed. "Annales Engolismenses." In Monumenta Germaniae Historica Scriptorum t.4, 5. Hannover: Impensis Bibliopolii Hahniani, 1841.
- Pertz, Georgius Henricus, ed. "Annales Engolismenses." In Monumenta Germaniae Historica Scriptorum t.16, 485–87. Hannover: Impensis Bibliopolii Hahniani, 1859.
- Piveteau, Cécile. "Les évêques d'Angoulême aux XIIIe et XIVe siècles." Bulletins et mémoires de la Société archéologique et historique de la Charente (1983): 119–39.
- Puybaudet, Guy de. "Une liste épiscopale d'Angoulême." Mélanges d'archéologie et d'histoire 17 (1897): 279–84.
- Sainte-Marthe, Denis de (1720). Gallia Christiana: In Provincias Ecclesiasticas Distributa... Provinciae Burdigalensis, Bituricensis (in Latin). Vol. Tomus secundus. Paris: Typographia Regia. pp. 978–1052, Instrumenta, pp. 443–456.
- Société bibliographique (France) (1907). L'épiscopat français depuis le Concordat jusqu'à la Séparation (1802-1905). Paris: Librairie des Saints-Pères.

=== External links ===
- (in French) Centre national des Archives de l'Église de France, L’Épiscopat francais depuis 1919, retrieved: 2016-12-24.
