= Pieces of Africa =

Studio album by Kronos Quartet
- Released: February 1992
- Genre: Contemporary classical
- Label: Nonesuch (#79275)

Kronos Quartet chronology
Henryk Mikolaj Górecki: Already It Is Dusk / "Lerchenmusik" (1991)	Pieces of Africa (1992)	Short Stories (1993)

Pieces of Africa is a 1992 studio album by the Kronos Quartet, containing works commissioned by the quartet, written by seven African composers.

== Track listing ==
No.	Title	Writer(s)	Length
1.	"Mai Nozipo" ("Mother Nozipo")	Dumisani Maraire (Shona, Zimbabwe)	6:58
2.	"Saade" ("I'm Happy")	Hassan Hakmoun (Moroccan)	3:23
3.	"Tilliboyo" ("Sunset")	Foday Musa Suso (Mandinka, Gambia)	4:23
4.	"Ekitundu ekisooka" ("First Movement")	Justinian Tamusuza (Uganda)	5:41
5.	"Escalay" ("Waterwheel")	Hamza El Din (Nubia, Egypt)	12:20
6.	"Wawshishijay" ("Our Beginning")	Obo Addy (Ghana)	4:56
7.	"White Man Sleeps, Mvt. I" (original, unrevised)	Kevin Volans (South Africa)	4:02
8.	"White Man Sleeps, Mvt. II"		5:05
9.	"White Man Sleeps, Mvt. III"		3:24
10.	"White Man Sleeps, Mvt. IV"		6:17
11.	"White Man Sleeps, Mvt. V"		3:22
12.	"Kutambarara" ("Spreading")	Dumisani Maraire	7:09

== Reception and legacy ==
According to AllMusic, the Quartet avoids cultural imperialism or appropriation and, "Pieces of Africa teems with beguiling melodies, making it one of this quartet's more accessible projects and also one of its best." A review in Gramophone argues that only Escalay and White Man Sleeps are successful compositions for string quartet.

It was inducted into the National Recording Registry on April 16, 2024 for being "culturally, historically, or aesthetically significant" by the Library of Congress.

== Personnel ==
=== Musicians ===
- David Harrington – violin, akete
- John Sherba – violin, akete
- Hank Dutt – viola, akete
- Joan Jeanrenaud – cello, akete
- Oakland Interfaith Gospel Choir, Terrence Kelly – conductor
- Hassan Hakmoun, Said Hakmoun, Radouane Laktib, Dumisani Maraire – voice
- Obo Addy – drums
- Hamza El Din – tar
- Radouane Laktib – oud
- Foday Musa Suso – kora
- Said Hakmoun – bendir
- Ephat Mujuru – mbira
- Dan Pauli – hosho

=== Production ===
- Bob Edwards, Judith Sherman, Paul Zinman – Engineers
- Judith Sherman – Producer

== See also ==
- List of 1992 albums
- World music

== Sales ==
Region	Certification	Certified units/sales
United States	—	85,000
Summaries
Worldwide	—	300,000
