= Mujuru =

Mujuru is a surname. Notable people with the surname include:

- Bonaparte Mujuru (born 1987), Zimbabwean cricketer
- Joice Mujuru (born 1955), Zimbabwe politician
- Solomon Mujuru (1945–2011), Zimbabwe guerrilla
- Ephat Mujuru (1950–2001), Zimbabwe musician
