= Justinian Tamusuza =

Ugandan composer

- Born: 1951 (age 74–75); Kibisi, Uganda
- Genres: Contemporary classical music, African classical fusion
- Occupations: Composer, Music Educator
- Label: International Opus

Justinian Tamusuza (born 1951) is a Ugandan composer of contemporary classical music. His music combines elements of traditional Ugandan music and Western music. He is best known for his first string quartet, which was included by the Kronos Quartet on their 1992 CD Pieces of Africa, which contains music by seven African composers. His music has also been performed by the Imani Winds.

== Early life and education ==
Tamusuza was born in Kibisi, a village in rural Uganda, where he was immersed in traditional Kiganda music from a young age. He learned as a child from the local traditional musicians, who played instruments such as the endingidi (tube-fiddle) and drums and sang at his parents' home. He notes that he still considers himself a student of this "school of traditional musicians". His early training was in Baganda traditional music, and his earliest instructors included the Reverend Anthony Okelo.

Tamusuza's formal schooling combined his background in Uganda's traditional music with Western influences. He attended Catholic seminaries, including Nswanjere and Kisubi Seminaries, and later St. Mary's College Kisubi and King's College Budo. In these schools, he served as the accompanist for the chapel choirs, which exposed him to Western hymns and musical structures. Tamusuza went on to study music in Europe and the United States. He trained at Queen's University Belfast in Northern Ireland, where he studied with Kevin Volans, and he earned a doctorate from Northwestern University in Evanston, Illinois, where he studied with Alan Stout.

== Career ==
Tamusuza has taught at Makerere University in Kampala, Uganda, where he served as a Professor of Music (Composition) in the Department of Performing Arts and Film, teaching composition, musicology, theory, and performance. He also served as the Head of the Department of Music, Dance, and Drama at Makerere.

Tamusuza held a professorship and taught at the School of Music at Northwestern University, where he had earned his doctorate.

=== Composition career ===
Pieces of Africa. The first movement of his string quartet Mu Kkubo Ery'Omusaalaba ("On the Way of the Cross") was included on the Kronos Quartet's groundbreaking album of 1992. The album reached number one on both the Billboard Classical and World Music charts, bringing his name to world attention.

Commissions. The success of the album led to numerous commissions from major ensembles and organizations, including a second commission from the Kronos Quartet for another string quartet, Twadaagana Ku Lw'Omwana (1992). Other commissions came from The International Society of Contemporary Music (ISCM), The Munich Chamber Orchestra, and Ensemble Jahrhundeert XX of Vienna.

Leadership Roles. He has served on the juries of international music bodies and was the Artistic Director of the africa95 African Composers Workshop in the United Kingdom.

Publications. His music is published internationally by International Opus and African Composers Edition, and his works are featured on more than twenty international publications and CDs.

== Honors ==
His educational pursuits earned him several honors, including:

- The British Council Fellowship for his MA in Twentieth Century Music at Queen's University Belfast.
- The Gwendolen M. Carter Scholarship for his Doctorate in Music Composition at Northwestern University.
- A Fulbright Senior Award for a Visiting Professorship at Northwestern University.
- A visiting fellowship at the Stellenbosch Institute for Advanced Studies (STIAS) in 2019.

== Personal life ==
Tamusuza is married to Sylvia Nannyonga-Tamusuza, an African ethnomusicologist and Associate Professor at Makerere University in Uganda. They have several children and reside in Uganda. Justinian and Sylvia are a "husband-wife team" who often collaborate professionally, notably during a cross-continental residency hosted by Orchestra 2001 in 2023-2024.

A 2009 article mentioned that the couple had three children at the time, all sharing a cramped apartment and sleeping in a triple-decker bunk bed, before they took in another child, Oliva, as her legal guardians. Sylvia was later noted to have two more children.

== See also ==
- Robert Nathaniel Dett
- Rauf Dhomi
- Rocco Di Pietro
- Eduardo Diazmuñoz
- Rudi Martinus van Dijk
- Limoz Dizdari
- Heraclius Djabadary
- Đỗ Nhuận
- Victor Dolidze (composer)
- Kui Dong
- Árpád Doppler
