= Giovanni Battista Adriani =

Italian historian (1511 or 1513–1579)

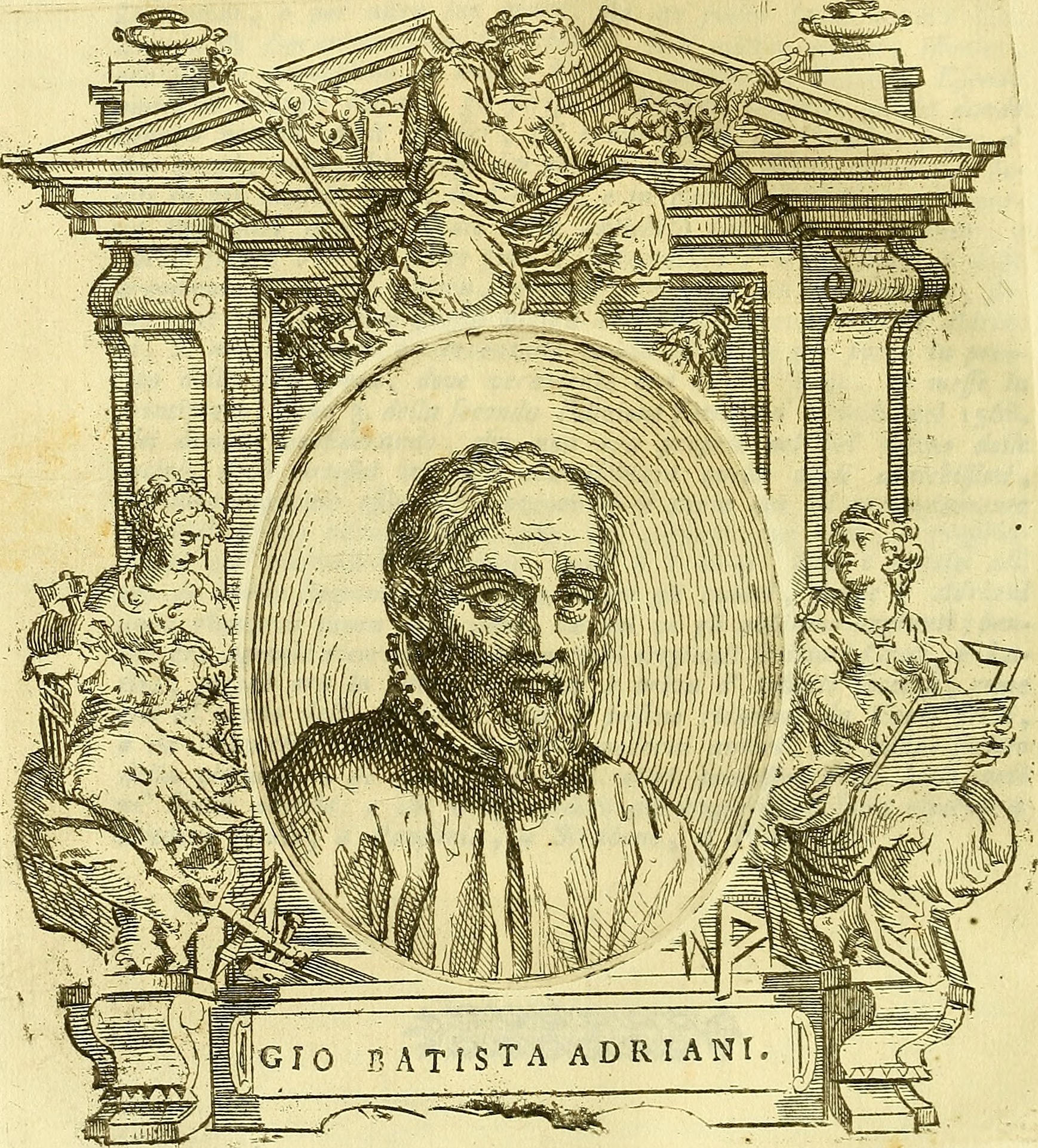
Giovanni Battista Adriani

Giovanni Battista Adriani (1511 or 1513 – 1579) was an Italian historian.

== Life ==
He was born in 1511 or 1513, in Cherasco, into a patrician Florentine family. His father, Marcello Virgilio Adriani (died 27 November 1521), was a professor of literature, and served as the chancellor of the Republic. In 1538, he joined the Order of Clerics Regular of Somasca and soon became a teacher of philosophy and theology. From 1546 to 1553, he was a professor of history and geography at Collegio-Convitto di Casale.

Giovanni Battista was secretary to the Republic of Florence. He was among the defenders of the city during the siege of 1530, but subsequently joined the Medici party and was appointed professor of rhetoric at the university.

At the instance of Cosimo I he wrote in Italian a contemporary history, spanning from 1536 to 1574, which is generally considered a continuation of Guicciardini chronicles, although the historian Brunet finds this notion erroneous. This Istoria dei suoi tempi was published in Florence in 1583; a new edition appeared also in Florence in 1872. De Thou acknowledges himself greatly indebted to this history, praising it especially for its accuracy.

Adriani also composed funeral orations in Latin on the emperor Charles V and other noble personages, and was the author of a long letter on ancient painters and sculptors prefixed to the first volume of Vasari.

Giovanni Battista's son, named Marcello, born 1533 became a professor of rhetoric at the Accademia Fiorentina. He edited and translated a number of classic texts, including the Trattato dell'elocuzione by Demetrius of Phalerum.

== Works ==
- Giovan Battista Adriani: Istoria de’ svoi tempi ... Divisa in libri ventidue. Di Nuovo Mandata In Luce. Con li sommarii, e tavola delle cose più notabili. 2 vols. Giunti, Florence, 1583.
- Adolfo Bartoli (ed.): Scritti vari editi ed inediti di G.B. Adriani e di Marcello suo figliuolo. Gaetano Romagnoli, Bologna, 1871.

== Sources ==
- This cites G. M. Mazzucchelli, Gli Scrittori d' Italia, i. p. 151 (Brescia, 1753).
- De Gubernatis, Angelo (1879). Dizionario biografico degli scrittori contemporanei diretto da Angelo De Gubernatis (in Italian). Successori Le Monnier.
- Mazzucchelli, Giammaria (1822). Notizie intorno alla vita di Giovanbatista Adriani. pp. 13–20.
