= Claude Dagens =

French prelate of the Catholic Church

Claude Jean Pierre Dagens
- Bishop Emeritus of Angoulême
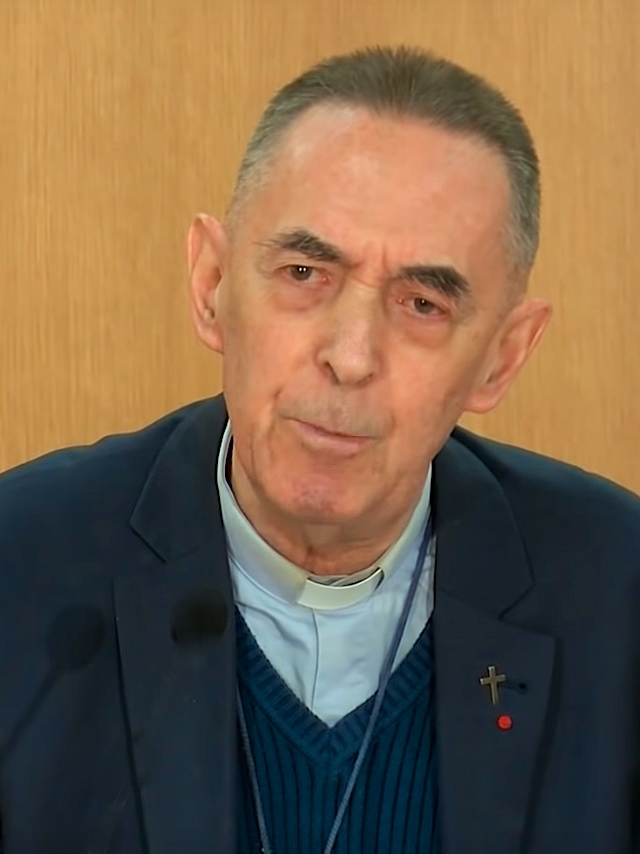
- Claude Dagens in 2018
- Church: Catholic Church
- Diocese: Diocese of Angoulême
- In office: 22 December 1993 – 9 November 2015
- Predecessor: Georges Rol
- Successor: Hervé Gosselin
- Previous posts: Coadjutor Bishop of Angoulême (1993); Titular Bishop of Vulturaria (1987-1993); Auxiliary Bishop of Poitiers (1987-1993)

Orders
- Ordination: 4 October 1970
- Consecration: 20 September 1987 by Marius Maziers

Personal details
- Born: 20 May 1940 (age 86) Caudéran (in present-day Bordeaux), Gironde, France

Claude Jean Pierre Dagens French pronunciation: [klod ʒɑ̃ pjɛʁ daʒɑ̃s]; born 20 May 1940 in Caudéran (now part of Bordeaux) is a French prelate of the Catholic Church and member of the Académie française, occupying seat 1 since 2008. He served as bishop of Angoulême from 1993 to 2015.

== Biography ==
Despite his mother's opposition, Dagens was ordained as a Catholic priest on 4 October 1970 after completing his agrégation at the École normale supérieure. In 1975, he received his doctor of arts with the publication of a thesis on pope Gregory I, completed at the University Paris IV under the direction of Henri-Irénée Marrou, whom he considered his maître à penser.

He was named the auxiliary bishop of the Diocese of Poitiers by pope Jean-Paul II on 3 July 1987 and held the position until 1993. He was coadjutor bishop of the Diocese of Angoulême from 15 June 1993, before becoming Bishop of Angoulême on 22 December 1993. He retired on 9 November 2015 and was made Bishop Emeritus of Angoulême. He named Hervé Gosselin as his successor.

He is a specialist theologian, and was elected in the first round to be the twentieth member to occupy seat 1 of the Académie française on 17 April 2008, succeeding René Rémond. He has written abundantly about the role of the Church in French society and its relationship with secularism.

Because of his ecumenism and dialogue with members of Freemasonry, he has provoked the irritation of some Traditionalist Catholics (see Catholicism and Freemasonry).
