= Alan Stout (composer) =

American composer (1932–2018)

Alan Burrage Stout Jr (November 26, 1932 – February 1, 2018) was an American composer of contemporary classical music.

Born in Baltimore, Maryland, Stout studied at Johns Hopkins University (B.S., 1954) and at the Peabody Conservatory. His instructors included Henry Cowell, Wallingford Riegger, John Verrall, and Vagn Holmboe, the latter at the University of Copenhagen in Denmark for a year. He then studied at the University of Washington, obtaining a M.A. in 1959.

Stout taught at Northwestern University beginning in 1962. His notable students include Joseph Schwantner, Augusta Read Thomas, Jay Kawarsky, Marlyce Polk Reed, Jared Spears, Marilyn Shrude, Maggi Payne, Michael Twomey, Justinian Tamusuza, Frank Ferko and Michael Pisaro. See: List of music students by teacher: R to S#Alan Stout.

Stout's style was modernist, incorporating elements of 12-tone music as well as experimental styles. His music has been performed by the Chicago Symphony Orchestra, Philadelphia Orchestra, and Baltimore Symphony Orchestra.

Stout lived in Evanston, Illinois.
