= Jérôme Daniel Beau =

French Catholic bishop (born 1957)

The Most Reverend Monsignor Jérôme Daniel Beau
- Metropolitan Archbishop of Poitiers
- Church: Catholic Church
- Archdiocese: Poitiers
- Diocese: Poitiers
- Appointed: 14 January 2025
- Installed: 2 March 2025
- Predecessor: Pascal Wintzer

Orders
- Ordination: 23 June 1984 by Jean-Marie Lustiger
- Consecration: 8 September 2006 by André Vingt-Trois

Personal details
- Born: Jérôme Daniel Beau; December 24, 1957 (age 68) Paris, France
- Denomination: Catholic Church
- Occupation: Bishop
- Education: L'Institut catholique de Paris
- Motto: Pro Spe Mundi
- Coat of arms

Styles of Jérôme Daniel Beau
- Reference style: His Excellency; The Most Reverend
- Spoken style: Your Excellency
- Religious style: Monsignor

Jérôme Daniel Beau (born 24 December 1957) is a French Catholic bishop. He previously served as the Archbishop of Bourges From 2018 to 2025. He also served as the Auxiliary Bishop of Paris from 2006 to 2018. On 14 January 2025, he was appointed as the Metropolitan Archbishop of Poitiers, succeeding Pascal Wintzer.

== Life and career ==
Jérôme Daniel Beau was born in Paris, France, on 24 December 1957. He attended the Saint Sulpice Interdiocesan Seminary in Issy-les-Moulineaux and carried out his studies in philosophy and theology at l'Institut catholique de Paris, where he was awarded a bachelor's degree and a master's degree in theology. He was ordained a priest on 23 June 1984 in Paris and incardinated there. After his priestly ordination, he received his assignment as parish vicar at Notre-Dame de Lorette Church, Paris (1984–1989), parish vicar at Saint-Denis du Saint-Sacrement Church, Paris (1989–1993), and formator of the major seminary in Paris (1989–2001), diocesan chaplain at the Youth Eucharistic Movement (MEG; 1990–1993), parish priest of Saint-Séverin in Paris and head of the Saint Séverin House of the Seminary of Paris (1993–2001), rector of the Seminary of Paris and diocesan delegate for seminarians (2001–2006), director of the Work for Vocations (2003–2006), and vicar general of Paris (2006–2018). On 1 June 2006 he was appointed auxiliary bishop of Paris, and on 25 July 2018, he was transferred to the archepiscopal see of Bourges; then, on 14 January 2025, to the metropolitan see of Poitiers. Within the French Episcopal Conference, he is a member of the Ressources et Moyens Board. On 2 March 2025, his installation was held in Poitiers Cathedral Basilica.
