= Jared Spears =

American composer and music teacher (born 1936)

- Born: Jared Tozier Spears; August 15, 1936 (age 90); Chicago, Illinois, United States
- Died: 09-18-2025
- Genre: Wind band music
- Occupations: Composer and music teacher
- Website: www.kendormusic.com/composer/spears.htm

Jared Tozier Spears (born August 15, 1936) is an American composer and music teacher.

== Biography ==
Spears was born in Chicago, Illinois.

Spears attended the Northern Illinois University in DeKalb, Illinois and earned his Bachelor of Science in education, business technology (BSE). He also studied percussion and composition from the Cosmopolitan School of Music in Chicago, where he received his bachelor's and master's degrees in music. He then studied at the Northwestern University in Chicago and received his Ph.D. in composition. Among his teachers were Blyth Own, Alan Stout and Anthony Donato.

Spears taught music theory, music history, composition and percussion in both high schools and in universities. By 1999 he had worked 32 years in education before retirement. He is a professor emeritus of the Arkansas State University (ASU) in Jonesboro, Arkansas.

As a composer he wrote more than 300 works for concert band, choir, orchestra and ensembles. As a conductor he was a popular guest in the United States, Canada and Europe at festivals, youth camps and clinics. He received numerous awards and honors such as the Faricy Award for creative music from Northwestern University School of Music, the "Award of Merit" from the board of the Arkansas department of the National Federation of Music Clubs and the American Society of Composers, Authors and Publishers (ASCAP).

== Compositions ==
=== Works for orchestra ===
- Dance Diabolique, for string orchestra
- Hill Point Fantasy - Overture for Orchestra

=== Compositions for band ===
- 1969 Kimberly Overture
- 1970 Dramatic Episode
- 1970 Neologue
- 1971 Chatham Overture
- 1972 Third Set
- 1972 Prologue and Pageant, suite
- 1973 Chronolog
- 1974 A Wind River Portrait
- 1974 Meditation and Festiva
- 1974 Triolog
- 1976 Premiere Passacaglia
- 1976 Wilderness Overture
- 1977 Momentations
- 1978 Novelette
- 1979 Alleluias
- 1979 Forest Park Overture
- 1980 At a Dixieland Jazz Funeral (for Concert Band with Dixieland Jazz Combo)
- 1981 Cantique and Festival
- 1981 Day of the Shofar
- 1981 Ritual and Capriccio
- 1981 Scenario
- 1982 Canticles
- 1982 Crestview
- 1982 Thunder Mountain Overture
- 1983 Prayer and Proclamation
- 1984 New Century Overture
- 1985 Westward Trails - General Words and Music
- 1985 March of the Martian Chickens
- 1986 Axon
- 1986 Jubilations
- 1986 Lament and Caprice
- 1986 Praeludium - based on chorale "Praise ye the Lord", the Almighty
- 1987 Colorama Overture
- 1987 Cannon Beach Overture
- 1987 Mission Creek
- 1987 New River Suite
- 1987 Roaring Mountain Overture
- 1987 Sentinel Overture
- 1989 Images and Faces from a World
- 1990 Castles of Llyr
- 1992 Spiritual
- 1993 The Water of the Myth
- 1996 Bravo!
- 1996 A Gathering of Angels
- 1997 Jubilation Overture
- 1998 The Adventurers
- 2000 Joyous Alleluias
- 2002 Mountain View Portrait
- 2005 Of Times Medieval - based on chorale "Veni Creator Spiritus"
- 2006 Return to Wind River
- A Furious Fable
- A Maverick Overture
- A Sacred Set
- Affirmation
- Cahokia
- Cantilena
- Collocation for Winds and Percussion
- Colorado Blue
- Country Cameos, suite
- Cyber Quest
- Dawn Seeker
- Deo Gratias
- Fiesta Nueva
- From a Schumann Album
- Heartland Sketches
- Heritage Hill
- Images Diabolique
- Legacy - Concerto, for three solo percussionists and band
- March for Moderns
- Northstar Overture
- Novena
- Of Honor, Joy and Celebration
- Of Land and Sea
- On Eagles' Wings
- Ozark Folk Suite
- Ritual and Celebration
- Sansketch
- Spirit Canyon March
- Star Gazer
- Star March
- Stormy Point Overture
- Suite Romantique
- Sun Island Overture
- The Brass Ring
- The Dream Chasers
- The Drums of Blackhawk
- The Freedom Chronicles
- The River Red
- Wabash County Saga
- Westwood Portrait
- Where Legends Live
- Wind River Overture

=== Chamber music ===
- 1997 A Kensington Portrait, for trombone quartet
- Colossus, for trombone quartet
- Divertimento for Tuba Ensemble
  1. Invention
  2. Melodrama
  3. Dance
  4. Chorale
  5. Toccata
- Stratford Point, for trombone quartet

=== Works for percussion ===
- Allegro Fantastica, for percussion quartet
- A Time For Jazz
- Bayport Sketch
- Caccia Caper
- Cameo Suite
  1. March For Mopeds
  2. Dreamscape
  3. Caper
- Ceremonium
- Collidescope
- Collisions
- Country Variations
- Dynamo
- Incantation And Festal Dance, for percussion octet
- Malletrix
- Mosaics
- Proclamations
- Ragtime Renegade
- Run, for percussion sextet
- Scamper
- Spiritus!, for percussion quintet
- Two Episodes
- Two Frescos
- Windstone Suite
  1. Windstone
  2. Drone Dance
  3. Distant Songs & Incantations
  4. Visions & Jubilations
- Woodworks

== Bibliography ==
- Wolfgang Suppan, Armin Suppan: Das Neue Lexikon des Blasmusikwesens, 4. Auflage, Freiburg-Tiengen, Blasmusikverlag Schulz GmbH, 1994, ISBN 3-923058-07-1
- Paul E. Bierley, William H. Rehrig: The heritage encyclopedia of band music : composers and their music, Westerville, Ohio: Integrity Press, 1991, ISBN 0-918048-08-7
- Jean-Marie Londeix: Musique pour saxophone, volume II : répertoire général des oeuvres et des ouvrages d' enseignement pour le saxophone, Cherry Hill: Roncorp Publications, 1985.
- E. Ruth Anderson: Contemporary American composers - A biographical dictionary, Second edition, Boston: G. K. Hall, 1982, 578 p., ISBN 978-0-816-18223-7
- James R. Pebworth: A directory of 132 Arkansas composers, Fayetteville, Arkansas: University Library, University of Arkansas, 1979, 89 p.
