= Music of the World =

World music record label

Music of the World is a world music record label that was active from 1982 to 2000. The company produced over 100 CDs and cassettes of traditional and contemporary artists from around the world. Nomad and Latitudes were imprint labels.

Music of the World was formed in New York in the early 1980s by Bob Haddad, an amateur ethnomusicologist, teacher and professional musician, who began to record demo tapes for traditional musicians in his apartment. Word began to spread among world music artists who needed recordings to sell at their gigs, and soon, world-class musicians began contacting Bob to ask for his help in producing recordings.

During these early years, and before a commercial consciousness of “world music” had developed, Music of the World was the only world music cassette music label in the West. Its catalog rapidly expanded to include artists from Africa, India, Asia, and Latin America, and in addition to opening accounts with major retailers across the US, the company began to export its recordings for overseas distribution. In 1989, Haddad and his partner, Martha Lorantos, moved from Brooklyn, NY to Chapel Hill, North Carolina. It was here where the label would see unprecedented growth. In that same year, the first two CDs were released, and over the next ten years, over 90 additional CD titles were produced. The label was distributed in over twenty countries worldwide.

The mid-1990s were peak years for the label, and were marked by the commercial success of several recordings, including the award-winning Vintage Beausoleil (Michael Doucet and Beausoleil); The Grammy-nominated Raga Aberi (with L. Shankar, Zakir Hussain and Vikku Vinayakram); and one of the label’s best selling recordings, Talking Spirits, featuring various Native American artists. In addition to the premier Music of the World (MOW) label, two label imprints were born during this period of growth. Nomad Records featured modern world music and world jazz, and Latitudes was a mid-price label featuring single-artist releases and compilations of traditional world music. The label received many awards from independent recording organizations such as NAIRD (AFIM) and NARAS (Grammys). Unlike other world music labels that licensed music tracks and entire recordings from other labels for re-release, Music of the World created almost all its own recordings. Bob Haddad worked closely with artists and distributors, and produced the great majority of the albums released on the labels. Other remarkable recordings and artists include Glen Velez, the father of modern frame drumming (Handdance; Ramana - USA); Dumisani Maraire (Chaminuka; Shona Spirit [with Ephat Mujuru] - Zimbabwe); Hassan Hakmoun (The Fire Within - Morocco); Badal Roy (Yantra; One in the Pocket - Bangladesh/USA); Tarun Bhattacharya and Bikram Ghosh (Sargam; Kirvani - India); Jalal Zolfonun (Kord Bayat; Mystic Journey - Iran), and many others.

In 2000, shortly after the emergence of Napster and during a time of great difficulty for independent record labels, Music of the World was acquired by emusic.com, one of the earliest digital download websites. In 2005, the label was acquired by The Orchard, a leading digital audio distributor. Today, entire albums and individual tracks from the catalog are available for download through major online streaming platforms. Physical copies of some of the Music of the World, Nomad and Latitudes CDs may still be purchased on major internet suppliers.

== Artists ==
- BeauSoleil
- Dumisani Maraire
- Ephat Mujuru
- Bikram Ghosh
- Trichy Sankaran
- Jalal Zolfonun
- Steve Gorn
- Tarun Bhattacharya
- Dagar Brothers
- Glen Velez
- Mike Richmond
- Badal Roy
- Hassan Hakmoun
- I.K. Dairo
- L. Shankar
- Necdet Yaşar
- James Makubuya
- Imrat Khan
- Zakir Hussain
- Talip Ozkan
