= Joseph Rozier =

French bishop

Joseph Rozier was bishop of Poitiers from 1975 to 1994. Near the end of his episcopate he published a statement in the Nouvelle République du Centre-Ouest outlining incompatibility between National Front membership and acceptance as a Christian catechumen. He died in 1994.
