= Oakland Interfaith Gospel Choir =

The Oakland Interfaith Gospel Choir (OIGC) is located in Oakland, California, US. It was founded in 1986 as an outgrowth of a gospel music workshop, and became an independent organization in 1991. The choir has since toured globally, produced multiple CDs and appeared in films and on television. The choir's repertoire is diverse, and OIGC has collaborated with a variety of pop artists from different genres, including gospel, jazz, and hip-hop.

Founded in 1986, the Oakland Interfaith Gospel Choir was born out of a gospel music workshop led by Terrance Kelly at Living Jazz’s Jazz Camp West. It became an independent nonprofit organization in 1991. Since then, the Choir’s harmonies and gospel repertoire have led to performances with a variety of groups, such as Joshua Nelson, the Prince of Kosher Gospel; the Five Blind Boys of Alabama; and the Duke Ellington Orchestra. The Choir also appears on albums by Linda Ronstadt, MC Hammer, Tramaine Hawkins, and others.

OIGC supports a youth gospel choir: Started in 1997, they perform at a wide variety of local and other events. The choir provides musical, educational, and social opportunities for Bay Area youth, as well as the chance for mentoring and scholarships.

The Community Choir was established in 2013. In less than two years, this choir grew to over 70 members, and peaked 200 singers in 2019. A non-auditioned choir, OICC meets once a month and performs several times throughout the year, including their own summer gospel concert.

In 2022, OIGC acquired the Oakland Youth Chorus. The acquisition added artistic director La Nell Martin to the team, expanding youth offerings and bringing the organization to a total of 8 ensembles.

Oakland Interfaith Gospel Choir Oakland Interfaith Community Choir Oakland Interfaith Youth Choir Oakland Interfaith Kids Choir Oakland Youth Chorus: Miracles Oakland Youth Chorus: Concert Chorus Oakland Youth Chorus: Chamber Chorus

== See also ==
The choir has inspired the formation other choirs, such as the Arcata Interfaith Gospel Choir , Portland Interfaith Gospel Choir, and others.

A documentary film was made about the choir in 2018, called "One Voice: The Story of the Oakland Interfaith Gospel Choir". It premiered at the Mill Valley Film Festival and was featured on KQED's "Truly CA" series in 2020. One Voice was directed by Spencer Wilkinson of Endangered Ideas.

== Recordings ==
Self-Produced
The Oakland Interfaith Gospel Choir—Live!, Oakland Interfaith Gospel Choir, 1991.
We’ve Come a Mighty Long Way, Oakland Interfaith Gospel Choir, 1995.
Rejoice! Christmas with the Oakland Interfaith Gospel Choir, Oakland Interfaith Gospel Choir, 1999.
Great Day: A Cappella Negro Spirituals, Oakland Interfaith Gospel Choir, 2003.
Hear My Prayer, Oakland Interfaith Gospel Choir, 2011.

Appears on:
Kronos Quartet, Pieces of Africa, Nonesuch, 1992
Hammer, Too Legit To Quit, Emd/Capitol, 1991.
Tramaine Hawkins, Tramaine—Live, Sparrow Records, 1990.
Linda Ronstadt, Cry Like a Rainstorm, Howl Like the Wind, Wea/Elektra Entertainment, 1989.
