= Archdiocese of Poitiers =

Catholic archdiocese in France

Coordinates: 46.579701°N 0.349421°E

Metropolitan Archdiocese of Poitiers Archidioecesis Metropolitae Pictaviensis Archidiocèse Métropolitain de Poitiers

Catholic
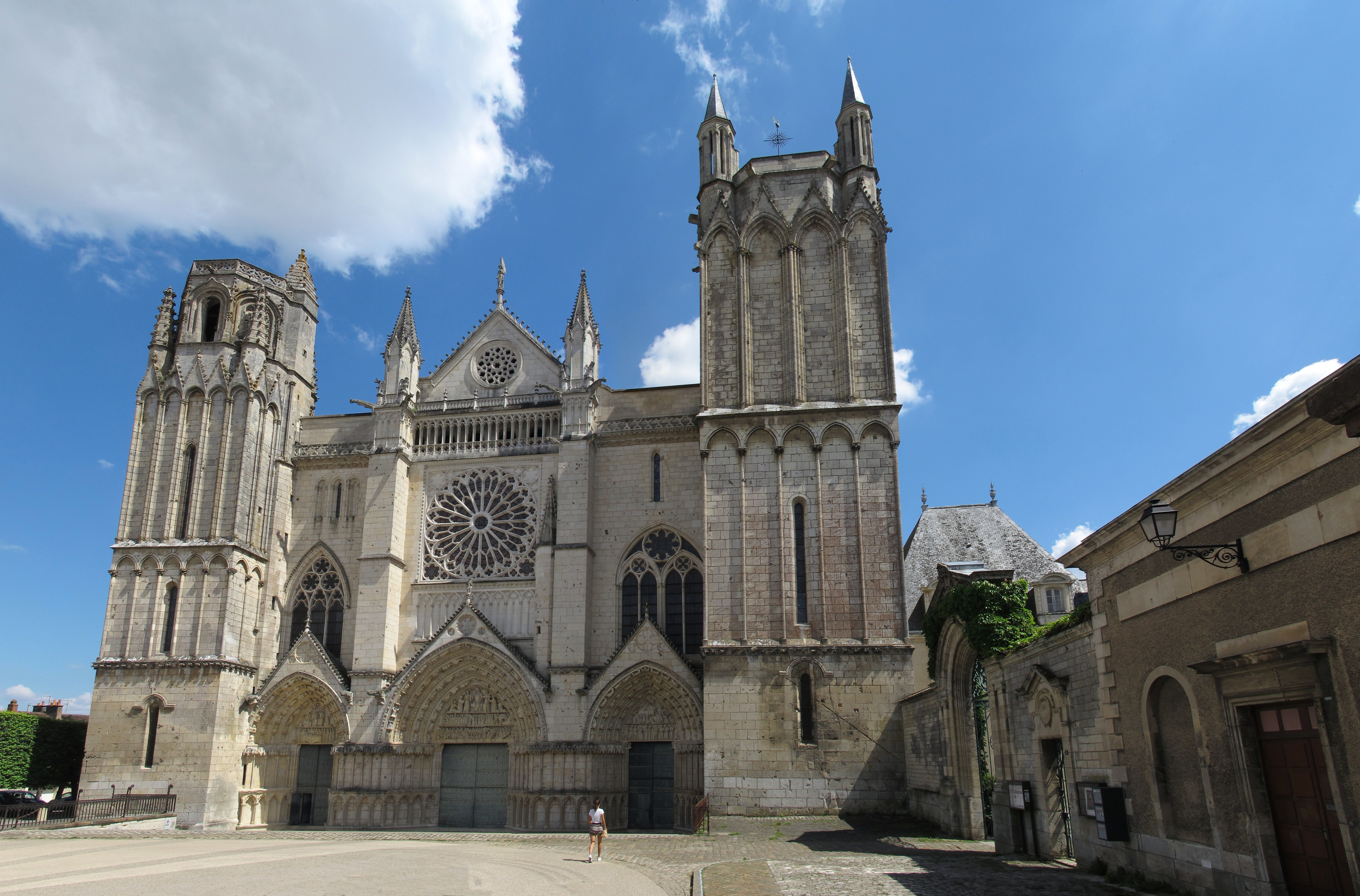
- Poitiers Cathedral

Location
- Country: France
- Ecclesiastical province: Poitiers

Statistics
- Area: 13,098 km^{2} (5,057 sq mi)
- Population: Total; Catholics: (as of 2021); 812,900 (est.); 661,000 (est.) (81.3%)
- Parishes: 28

Information
- Denomination: Roman Catholic
- Sui iuris church: Latin Church
- Rite: Roman Rite
- Established: 3rd Century (as Diocese); 8 December 2002 (as Archdiocese)
- Cathedral: Cathedral Basilica of St. Peter in Poitiers
- Patron saint: St. Hilary of Poitiers
- Secular priests: 150 (Diocesan); 5 (Religious Orders); 44 Permanent Deacons

Current leadership
- Pope: Leo XIV
- Metropolitan Archbishop: Jérôme Daniel Beau
- Suffragans: Angoulême; La Rochelle and Saintes; Limoges; Tulle
- Bishops emeritus: Albert Rouet Archbishop (2002–2011)

Map

Website
- Website of the Archdiocese (French)

Ecclesiastical province of Poitiers

The Metropolitan Archdiocese of Poitiers (Latin: Archidioecesis Metropolitae Pictaviensis; French: Archidiocèse Métropolitain de Poitiers) is a Latin archdiocese of the Catholic Church in France. The archepiscopal see is in the city of Poitiers. The Diocese of Poitiers includes the two Departments of Vienne and Deux-Sèvres. The Concordat of 1802 added to the see besides the ancient Diocese of Poitiers a part of the Diocese of La Rochelle and Saintes.

The diocese was erected according to an unsteady tradition in the third century, as a suffragan of the Archdiocese of Bordeaux. On 13 August 1317, the diocese was subdivided by Pope John XXII, and two new dioceses, Luçon and Maillezais, were created. The diocese was elevated to the rank of an archdiocese in 2002. The archdiocese is the metropolitan of the Diocese of Angoulême, the Diocese of La Rochelle, the Diocese of Limoges, and the Diocese of Tulle.

The Cathedral Church of Saint-Pierre had a chapter composed of the bishop and twenty-four canons. The officers of the chapter were: the dean, the cantor, the provost, the sub-dean, the sub-cantor, and the three archdeacons (who are not prebends). The abbé of Nôtre-Dame-le-Grand was also a member of the chapter ex officio.

Before the Revolution, the diocese had three archdeacons: the archdeacon of Poitiers, the archdeacon of Briançay (or Brioux), and the archdeacon of Thouars.

The current metropolitan archbishop is Jérôme Beau, who has yet to be installed and was appointed 14 January 2025. Since 2010 there have been three priestly ordinations in the diocese, and four ordinations of permanent deacons.

== History ==
Louis Duchesne holds that its earliest episcopal catalogue represents the ecclesiastical tradition of Poitiers in the twelfth century. The catalogue reckons twelve predecessors of Hilary of Poitiers, among them Nectarius, Liberius, and Agon, and among his successors Sts. Quintianus and Maxentius. Duchesne does not doubt the existence of the cults of these saints, but he questions whether they were bishops of Poitiers. In his opinion, Hilary (350 – 367 or 368) is the first bishop of whom we have historical evidence. In this he concurs with the Benedictine editors of Gallia Christiana.

=== Notable bishops ===
Among his successors were Arnauld d'Aux (1306–1312), made cardinal in 1312; Guy de Malsec (1371–1375), who became cardinal in 1375; Simon de Cramaud (1385–1391), indefatigable opponent of the antipope Benedict XIII, who became cardinal in 1413; Louis de Bar (1394–95), cardinal in 1397 who administered the diocese (1413–1423); Jean de la Trémouille (1505–07), cardinal in 1507; Gabriel de Gramont (1532–1534), cardinal in 1507; Claude de Longwy de Givry (1538–1552), became cardinal in 1533; Antonio Barberini (1652–1657), cardinal in 1627; Abbé de Pradt (1805–1809), Chaplain of Consul Napoleon Bonaparte and afterwards Archbishop of Mechlin, Louis Pie (1849–1880), cardinal in 1879.

St. Emmeram was a native of Poitiers, but according to the Bollandists and Duchesne the documents which make him Bishop of Poitiers (c. 650) are not trustworthy. On the other hand, Bernard Sepp, while admitting that there is no evidence (at vero in catalogo episcoporum huius dioecesis nomen Emmerammi non occurrit...), nonetheless points out that there is space after the death of Dido and the accession of Ansoaldus for Emmeramus, that is, between 674 and 696. Dom François Chamard, Abbot of Solesmes, claims that he did hold the see, and succeeded Didon, bishop about 666 or 668.

=== Education at Poitiers ===
As early as 312 the bishop of Poitiers established a school near his cathedral; among its scholars were Hilary, St. Maxentius, Maximus, Bishop of Trier, and his two brothers St. Maximinus of Chinon and St. John of Marne, Paulinus, Bishop of Trier, and the poet Ausonius. In the sixth century Fortunatus taught there, and in the twelfth century students chose to study at Poitiers with Gilbert de la Porrée.

Bishop Gilbert de la Porrée attended the concilium generale which began at Reims on 21 March 1148 and continued for the rest of the month, under the presidency of Pope Eugenius III. After the conclusion of the council, he was attacked in a papal consistory by Bernard of Clairvaux, always searching for heretics, schismatics and other deviants from his strict view of orthodoxy, for various heterodox theological opinions. Gilbert demanded that he be judged on the basis of what he had written, not on what people believed that he had said, and he was able to argue each charge successfully against Bernard. Pope Eugene ruled in Gilbert's favor, with the full agreement of the cardinals in attendance, and sent the bishop back to his diocese with his powers undiminished and in full honor.

==== The University ====
Charles VII of France erected a university at Poitiers, which was his temporary capital, since he had been driven from Paris, in 1431. The new foundation stood in opposition to Paris, where the city was in the hands of the English and the majority of the faculty had accepted Henry VI of England. With a Bull of 28 May 1431, on the petition of Charles VII, Pope Eugene IV approved the new university and awarded it privileges similar to those of the University of Toulouse. In the reign of Louis XII there were in Poitiers no less than four thousand students – French, Italians, Flemings, Scots, and Germans. There were ten colleges attached to the university. In 1540, at the Collège Ste. Marthe, the famous Classicist Marc Antoine Muret had a chair; Gregory XIII called him to Rome to work on his edition of the Septuagint, pronouncing him the torch and the pillar of the Roman School. The famous Jesuit Juan Maldonado and five of his confrères went in 1570 to Poitiers to establish a Jesuit college at the request of some of the inhabitants. After two unsuccessful attempts, the Jesuits were given the Collège Ste. Marthe in 1605. François Garasse was professor at Poitiers (1607–08), and had as a pupil Guez de Balzac. Garasse was well known for his violent polemics. He died of the plague at Poitiers in 1637. Among other students at Poitiers were Achille de Harlay, President de Thou, the poet Joachim du Bellay, the chronicler Brantome Descartes, François Viète the mathematician, and Francis Bacon. In the seventeenth century the Jesuits sought affiliation with the university and in spite of the opposition of the faculties of theology and arts their request was granted. Jesuit ascendancy grew; they united to Ste. Marthe the Collège du Puygareau. Friction between them and the university was continuous, and in 1762 the general laws against them throughout France led to the Society being expelled from Poitiers and from France. Moreover, from 1674 the Jesuits had conducted at Poitiers a college for clerical students from Ireland.

In 1806 the State reopened the school of law at Poitiers and later the faculties of literature and science. These faculties were raised to the rank of a university in 1896. From 1872 to 1875 Cardinal Pie was engaged in re-establishing the faculty of theology. As a provisional effort he called to teach in his Grand Séminaire three professors from the Collegio Romano, among them Fr. Clement Schrader, S.J., formerly a professor at Vienna and the commentator of the Syllabus, who died at Poitiers in 1875. The effort does not appear to have borne fruit, a casualty of the 1905 Law of the Separation of Church and State.

== Bishops ==
=== To 1000 ===
- [? Agon]
- Hilary of Poitiers (349–367)
- [Pascentius]
- [Quintianus]
- [Gelasius]
- [Anthemius]
- [Maigentius]
- Adelfius of Poitiers (533)
- Daniel of Poitiers (attested 541)
- Pientius 555 or 557–561
- Pescentius 561
- Maroveus (573–594)
- Plato (594–599)
- Venantius Fortunatus 599–610
- Caregisile (before 614)
- Ennoald (614–616)
- Johannes (John) I (attested 627)
- Dido (Desiderius) (c. 629–c. 669)
- Ansoald (c. 677 – after 697)
- Eparchius
- Maximinus
- Gaubert
- Godon de Rochechouart (c. 757)
- Magnibert
- Bertauld
- Benedict (Benoit)
- Johannes (John) (c. 800)
- Bertrand I
- Sigebrand (c. 818)
- Friedebert (attested 834)
- Ebroin (attested 838, 844, 848)
- Engenold (860, 862, 871)
- Frotier I (expelled)
- Hecfroi (attested 878 – 900)
- Frotier II (c. 900 – 936)
- Alboin c. 937
- Peter I (963–975)
- Gislebert (c. 975 – after 1018)

=== 1000 to 1300 ===
- Isembert I (c. 1021, 1028) (nephew of Bishop Gislebert)
- Isembert II c. 1047 – 1086 (nephew of Bishop Isembert)
- Peter II 22 February 1087 – 1117
- Guillaume I Gilbert 1117–1124
- Guillaume II Adelelme (1 June 1124 – 6 October 1140)
- Grimoard (1140 – 1142)
- Gilbert de La Porrée (1142 – 4 September 1154)
- Calo (attested 1155, 1157)
- Laurent (26 March 1159 – 27/28 March 1161)
- Jean aux Belles Mains 1162
- Guillaume Tempier (1184–1197)
- Ademar du Peirat (1198)
- Maurice de Blaron (1198 – 6 March 1214)
- Guillaume Prévost (April 1214 – 1224)
- Philippe Balleos (1224 – 8 February 1234)
- Jean de Melun (1235 – 11 November 1257)
- Hugo de Châteauroux (1259– 14 October 1271)
- Gauthier de Bruges (4 December 1279 – 1306)

=== 1300 to 1500 ===
- Arnaud d'Aux (4 November 1306 – December 1312)
- Fort d'Aux (29 March 1314 – 8 March 1357)
- Jean de Lieux (27 November 1357 – August 1362)
- Aimery de Mons (4 June 1363 – 3 March 1370)
- Guy de Malsec (Gui de Maillesec) (9 April 1371 – 1375)
- Bertrand de Maumont (9 January 1376 – 12 August 1385)
- Simon de Cramaud (24 November 1385 – 17 March 1391) (Avignon Obedience)
- Louis de Bar (1391–1395) (Avignon Obedience)
- Ythier de Mareuil (2 April 1395 – 1403) (Avignon Obedience)
- Gérard de Montaigu (27 September 1403 – 24 July 1409) (Avignon Obedience)
- Pierre Trousseau (11 September 1409 – 2 May 1413)
- Cardinal Louis de Bar (3 March 1423 – 1424) (Administrator)
- Hugo de Combarel (14 February 1424 – 1440)
- Guillaume Gouge de Charpaignes (15 December 1441 – 1448)
- Jacques Juvénal des Ursins (3 March 1449 – 12 March 1457)
- Léon Guérinet (1457 – 29 March 1462)
- Jean VI du Bellay (15 April 1462 – 3 September 1479)
- Guillaume VI de Cluny (26 October 1479 – 1481)
- Pierre d'Amboise (21 November 1481 – 1 September 1505)

=== 1500 to 1800 ===
- Cardinal Jean-François de la Trémoille (5 December 1505 – July 1507) (Administrator)
- Claude de Husson (1510–1521)
- Louis de Husson (1521–1532)
- Cardinal Gabriel de Gramont (Administrator) (13 January 1532 – 26 March 1534)
- Cardinal Claude de Longwy de Givry (29 April 1534 – 15xx ?) (Administrator)
- Jean d'Amoncourt (30 January 1551 – 1558)
- Charles de Pérusse des Cars (13 March 1560 – 19 December 1569)
- Jean du Fay, O.S.B. (3 March 1572 – died 5 November 1578)
- Geoffroy de Saint-Belin (27 March 1578 – 21 November 1611)
- Henri-Louis Chasteigner de La Roche-Posay (19 March 1612 – 30 July 1651)
- Antonio Barberini (1652 – 1657)
- Gilbert Clérembault de Palluau (1 April 1658 – 3 January 1680)
- Hardouin Fortin de La Hoguette (15 July 1680 – 21 January 1692)
- François-Ignace de Baglion de Saillant (23 November 1693 – 26 January 1698)
- Antoine-Girard de La Bournat (15 September 1698 – 8 March 1702)
- Jean-Claude de La Poype de Vertrieu (25 September 1702 – 3 February 1732)
- Jean-Louis de Foudras de Courcenay (3 February 1732 – 13 August 1748)
- Jean-Louis de La Marthonie de Caussade (21 April 1749 – 12 March 1759)
- Martial-Louis de Beaupoil de Saint-Aulaire (9 April 1759 – 1798)

=== From 1800 ===
- Jean-Baptiste-Luc Bailly (1802–1804)
- Dominique-Georges-Frédéric Dufour de Pradt (1804–1808)
- Jean-Baptiste de Bouillé (1817–1842)
- Joseph-Aimé Guitton (1842–1849)
- Louis-François-Désiré-Edouard Pie (1849–1880)
- Jacques-Edmé-Henri Philadelphe Bellot des Minières (1880 – 15 March 1888)
- Augustin-Hubert Juteau (1889–1893)
- Henri Pelgé (1894–1911)
- Louis Humbrecht (1 September 1911 – 14 September 1918)
- Olivier de Durfort de Civrac (1918 – 1932)
- Edouard Mesguen 1933–1956
- Henri Vion 1956–1975
- Joseph Rozier 1975–1994
- Albert Rouet (first archbishop) 1994–2011
- Pascal Wintzer 2012-6 October 2024
- Jérôme Daniel Beau (Appointed 14 January 2025)

== Bibliography ==
=== Reference works ===
- Gams, Pius Bonifatius (1873). Series episcoporum Ecclesiae catholicae: quotquot innotuerunt a beato Petro apostolo. Ratisbon: Typis et Sumptibus Georgii Josephi Manz. (Use with caution; obsolete)
- Eubel, Conradus, ed. (1913). Hierarchia catholica, Tomus 1 (second ed.). Münster: Libreria Regensbergiana. (in Latin)
- Eubel, Conradus, ed. (1914). Hierarchia catholica, Tomus 2 (second ed.). Münster: Libreria Regensbergiana. (in Latin)
- Gulik, Guilelmus (1923). Eubel, Conradus (ed.). Hierarchia catholica, Tomus 3 (second ed.). Münster: Libreria Regensbergiana.
- Gauchat, Patritius (Patrice) (1935). Hierarchia catholica IV (1592-1667). Münster: Libraria Regensbergiana.
- Ritzler, Remigius; Sefrin, Pirminus (1952). Hierarchia catholica medii et recentis aevi V (1667-1730). Patavii: Messagero di S. Antonio.
- Ritzler, Remigius; Sefrin, Pirminus (1958). Hierarchia catholica medii et recentis aevi VI (1730-1799). Patavii: Messagero di S. Antonio.
- Ritzler, Remigius; Sefrin, Pirminus (1968). Hierarchia Catholica medii et recentioris aevi sive summorum pontificum, S. R. E. cardinalium, ecclesiarum antistitum series... A pontificatu Pii PP. VII (1800) usque ad pontificatum Gregorii PP. XVI (1846) (in Latin). Vol. VII. Monasterii: Libr. Regensburgiana.
- Remigius Ritzler; Pirminus Sefrin (1978). Hierarchia catholica Medii et recentioris aevi... A Pontificatu PII PP. IX (1846) usque ad Pontificatum Leonis PP. XIII (1903) (in Latin). Vol. VIII. Il Messaggero di S. Antonio.
- Pięta, Zenon (2002). Hierarchia catholica medii et recentioris aevi... A pontificatu Pii PP. X (1903) usque ad pontificatum Benedictii PP. XV (1922) (in Latin). Vol. IX. Padua: Messagero di San Antonio. ISBN 978-88-250-1000-8.

=== Studies ===
- Jean, Armand (1891). Les évêques et les archevêques de France depuis 1682 jusqu'à 1801 (in French). Paris: A. Picard.
- Auber, Charles Auguste (1849). Histoire de la cathédrale de Poitiers (in French). Vol. Tome I. Poitiers: Derache.
- Auber, Charles Auguste (1849). Histoire de la Cathédrale de Poitiers (in French). Vol. Tome II. Poitiers: Derache.
- Baunard, Louis (Mgr.) (1886). Histoire du Cardinal Pie, Évêque de Poitiers (in French). Vol. II (deuxième ed.). Poitiers: H. Oudin.
- Beauchet-Filleau, Henri (1868). Pouillé du diocèse de Poitiers (in French). Niort: L. Clouzot.
- Béduchaud, J. M. U. (1906). Le clergé du diocèse de Poitiers depuis le Concordat de 1801 jusqu'à nos jours: les évêques et les prêtres morts depuis le Concordat jusqu'au 31 décembre 1905 (in French). Poitiers: Société française d'imprimerie et de librairie.
- Delfour, Joseph (1902). Les jésuites à Poitiers (1604-1762) (in French). Paris: Hachette & Cie.
- Duchesne, Louis (1910). Fastes épiscopaux de l'ancienne Gaule: II. L'Aquitaine et les Lyonaises. Paris: Fontemoing. second edition (in French)
- Favreau, Robert; Pon, Georges (1988). Le Diocèse de Poitiers (in French). Poitiers: Editions Beauchesne. ISBN 978-2-7010-1170-7. [A list of bishops at pp. 341–342]
- Foucart, Émile-Victor (1841). Poitiers et ses monuments (in French). Poitiers: A. Pichot.
- Fournier, Marcel; Charles Engel (1892). Les statuts et privilèges des universités françaises depuis leur fondation jusqu'en 1789: ouvrage publié sous les auspices du Ministère de l'instruction publique et du Conseil général des facultés de Caen. Paris: L. Larose et Forcel. pp. 283–336.
- Galtier, Paul, SJ (1960). Saint Hilaire de Poitiers, Le premier Docteur de l'eglise latine (in French). Paris: Editions Beauchesne. GGKEY:PZZ3WGK4Q1G.
- Haring, Nicholas M. (1951). The Case of Gilbert de la Porrée, Bishop of Poitiers, 1142-1154.
- Kaminsky, Howard (1983). Simon De Cramaud and the Great Schism. New Brunswick, N.J. USA: Rutgers University Press. ISBN 978-0-8135-0949-5.
- Rennie, Kriston R. (2007), "The Council of Poitiers (1078) and Some Legal Considerations," Bulletin of Medieval Canon Law, Vol. 27 (n.s. 1) pp. 1–20.
- Sainte-Marthe, Denis de (1720). Gallia Christiana: In Provincias Ecclesiasticas Distributa... Provinciae Burdigalensis, Bituricensis (in Latin). Vol. Tomus secundus. Paris: Typographia Regia. pp. 1136–1363.
- Tableau des évêques constitutionnels de France, de 1791 a 1801 (in French). Paris: chez Méquignon-Havard. 1827. p. 32.
- Vallière, Laurent (ed.) (2008): Fasti Ecclesiae Gallicanae. Répertoire prosopographique des évêques, dignitaires et chanoines des diocèses de France de 1200 à 1500. X. Diocèse de Poitiers. Turnhout, Brepols. (in French) [A convenient summary list of the bishops is given at p. 429.]
