= Louis-Édouard-François-Desiré Pie =

French Catholic bishop and cardinal (1815–1880)

His Eminence Louis-Édouard-François-Desiré Pie
- Bishop of Poitiers
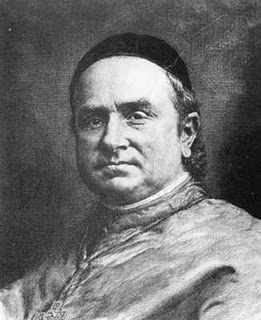
- Church: Roman Catholic Church
- Diocese: Poitiers
- See: Poitiers
- Appointed: 28 September 1849
- Term ended: 18 May 1880
- Predecessor: André-Joseph Guitton
- Successor: Jacques-Edne-Henri-Philadelphe Bellot des Minières
- Other post: Cardinal-Priest of Santa Maria della Vittoria (1879–80)

Orders
- Ordination: 25 May 1839 by Claude-Hippolyte Clausel de Montals
- Consecration: 25 November 1849 by Claude-Hippolyte Clausel de Montals
- Created cardinal: 12 May 1879 by Pope Leo XIII
- Rank: Cardinal-Priest

Personal details
- Born: Louis-Édouard-François-Desiré Pie; 26 September 1815 Pontgouin, Chartres, France
- Died: 18 May 1880 (aged 64) Angoulême, France
- Motto: Ego Tuus sum
- Coat of arms

Louis-Édouard-François-Desiré Pie (26 September 1815 – 18 May 1880), also referred to as Cardinal Pie, was a French Catholic bishop of Poitiers and cardinal, known for his ultramontanism and defence of the social reign of Christ the King.

== Early life and seminary ==
Pie was born in Pontgouin in the diocese of Chartres on 26 September 1815, just after the Napoleonic Wars, between the Battle of Waterloo (18 June 1815) and the Treaty of Paris (20 November 1815). In 1835, Pie entered the seminary of St. Sulpice, where he remained for four years. He then continued his theological studies.

While developing a reputation for arguing the ultramontane cause against Gallican professors, the young priest developed a friendship with Abbé Lecomte, pastor of the Cathedral of Chartres. Abbé Lecomte, who had repeatedly refused episcopal appointment, was an ultramontane defender of papal infallibility, and a great admirer of the thought of Joseph de Maistre. Increasingly taking on the role of protector and spiritual father to Pie, Lecomte's death – which occurred on 31 December 1850 – was a very painful episode for Pie, who had risen at his relatively young age to occupancy of the see of Poitiers. He wrote the same day the brother of his deceased friend, Gabriel Lecomte: "I have no words, sir, and worthy friend, to express my excessive pain (...) I loved as a father, as a brother, as a unique friend, he for whom death came knocking. I can not stop the course of my tears, and yet still they are insufficient to unload my heart." Another man who played a leading role in the life of Abbé Pie was his bishop, Clausel Montale, who knew him as a seminarian and later as a young priest and vicar of Chartres. Bishop Montale had been the chaplain of Madame la Dauphine, Duchesse d'Angoulême, before being named bishop of Chartres.

Pie received the four minor orders in 1837 and was ordained deacon 9 June 1838.

== Clerical career ==
Pie was ordained priest on 25 May 1839. In 1843, on 4 January, Bishop Montale appointed Pie his Vicar General. Pope Pius IX appointed Pie to the episcopate on 28 September 1849, and he was consecrated on 25 November by Claude-Hippolyte Clausel Montale.

At the First Vatican Council on 1869, Pie was the leading figure among the French for the definition of papal infallibility.

On 29 January 1879, Cardinal Nina, the Vatican Secretary of State, officially notified Pie of his elevation to the dignity of cardinal. He was created cardinal by Pope Leo XIII in the consistory of 12 May 1879 with the title of Cardinal Priest of St. Mary of Victories. He chose as his groomsmen to accompany him to Rome at the presentation of his cardinal's hat Charles Veillard, Charles Clémot, Gonzague de la Rochebrochard and Henry Savatier.

Pie died a year later in his sixty-fifth year, on 18 May 1880 at Angoulême, where he had come to preach. He was buried in the crypt of Notre-Dame la Grande de Poitiers.

== Politics and philosophy ==
Pie preached against Liberalism as exemplified by the French Revolution and Louis Philippe I, giving sermons on this topic in 1844 and 1846. On 12 July 1846, he wrote to M. de Estoile: "The neo-liberal Catholic party is a child of the Revolution and the Revolution is satanic in its essence."

Another common theme in Pie's letters and sermons was the need to return to Christianity as a cornerstone of society. In his first pastoral letter as bishop, he wrote: "Everything has to be redone to create a Christian people: this will not happen by miracle or by a series of miracles especially, it will be through the priestly ministry, or it will not happen at all, and then society will perish." Pie returned to this theme in his Works, writing: "We will not change the essence of things; Jesus Christ is the cornerstone of the whole social order. Without him, everything collapses, everything becomes divided and perishes."

== Legacy ==
Pie's major biographer was Louis Baunard (in his Histoire du cardinal Pie : évêque de Poitiers, H. Oudin, Poitiers, 1886) He would, years after his death, be favourably cited by Pope Pius X, who knew his writings well. His "Works" (pastoral letters, sermons, homilies, speeches, etc.) fill twelve volumes, and his social teaching has in recent years been enthusiastically promoted by members of the Society of St. Pius X.

== Quotations ==
Jesus Christ has been constituted the King of kings. Yes - and the true glory, the true nobility of kings, ever since the preaching of the Gospel, has consisted in being the lieutenants of Jesus Christ on earth. Has the greatness of kings been diminished by the crosses glittering atop their diadems? Have their thrones been less renowned or less secure on account of their kingship being recognised as an emanation of, and participation in, the kingship of Jesus Christ? Jesus Christ is King, and the true dignity, the true liberty, the true emancipation of modern nations lies in their right to be governed in a Christian manner. Have such nations fallen short of their glory? Has their fate been less noble, less happy on account of their ruling sceptres being bound to submit to the sceptre of Jesus? Let it be repeated, brethren: Christianity does not reach its full development, its full maturity, where it does not take on a social character. Such is what Bossuet expressed in this way: 'Christ does not reign if his Church is not mistress, if the peoples cease to pay to Jesus Christ, to his doctrine, to his law, a national homage.' When the Christianity of a country is reduced to the bare proportions of the domestic life, when Christianity is no longer the soul of public life, of public power, of public institutions, then Jesus Christ deals with this country in the manner he is there dealt with. He continues to give his grace and his blessings to the individuals who serve him, but he abandons the institutions, the powers which do not serve him; and the institutions, the kings, the nations become like shifting sand in the desert, they fall away like the autumn leaves which are gone with the wind. (Cardinal Pie, Works, vol. II, pp. 259–60)

The main error, the capital crime of this century is the pretension of withdrawing public society from the government and the law of God... The principle laid at the basis of the whole modern social structure is atheism of the law and of the institutions. Let it be disguised under the names of abstention, neutrality, incompetence or even equal protection, let us even go to the length of denying it by some legislative dispositions for details or by accidental and secondary acts: the principle of the emancipation of the human society from the religious order remains at the bottom of things; it is the essence of what is called the new era. (Cardinal Pie, Pastoral Works, vol. VII, pp. 3, 100)

The time has not come for Jesus Christ to reign? Well, then the time has not come for governments to last. (Cardinal Pie, meeting with Emperor Napoleon III)
