= Angoulême Cathedral =

Romanesque Roman Catholic cathedral in France

Cathedral of Saint Peter of Angoulême Cathédrale Saint-Pierre d'Angoulême
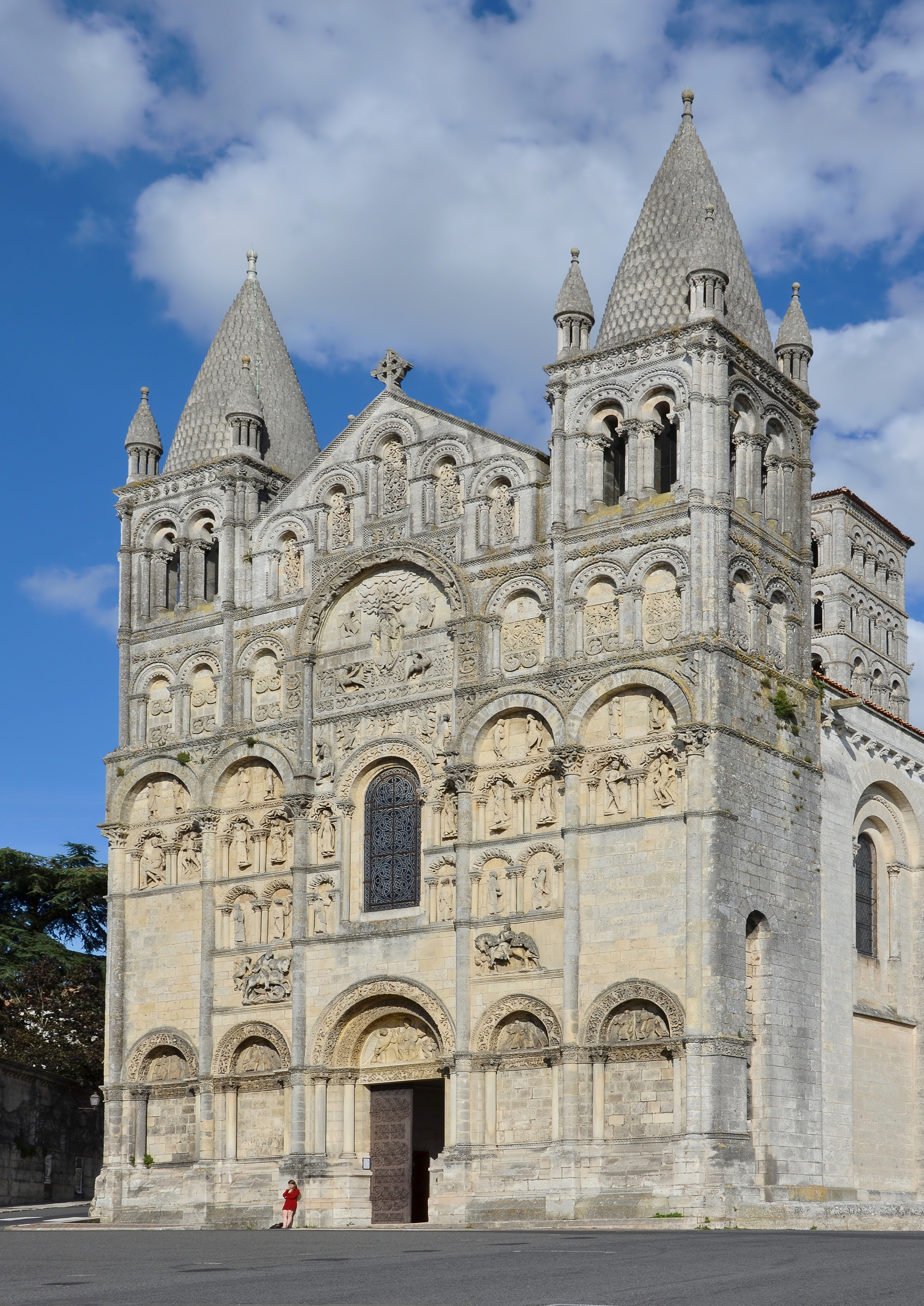
- Façade of the Cathedral

Religion
- Affiliation: Roman Catholic Church
- Diocese: Diocese of Angoulême
- Rite: Roman
- Ecclesiastical or organisational status: Cathedral

Location
- Location: Angoulême, Charente, Nouvelle-Aquitaine, France
- Interactive map of Cathedral of Saint Peter of Angoulême; Cathédrale Saint-Pierre d'Angoulême
- Coordinates: 45°38′56″N 0°9′6″E

Architecture
- Type: church
- Style: Romanesque

Angoulême Cathedral (French: Cathédrale Saint-Pierre d'Angoulême) is a Roman Catholic church in Angoulême, Charente, France. The cathedral is in the Romanesque architectural and sculptural tradition, and is the seat of the Bishop of Angoulême.

== Architecture and art ==
The façade is decorated by more than 70 sculptures, organized into two decorative themes, the Ascension and the Last Judgement, which are cleverly intermingled. Christ is portrayed within mandorlas, while two tall angels address the apostles to show them the celestial vision. All their faces, as well as those of the other faithful under the arches, look toward the Redeemer; vice versa, the damned, pushed back in the side arches and turned into Satan's victims, suffer their punishment.

Apart from these two main subjects, the sculptors portrayed scenes of everyday life, such as hunting, not avoiding to underline hardships and painstaking labour.

The interior of the nave is covered with three domes, a transept of great length with lofty towers over the north and south ends, and an apsidal choir with four chevet chapels. At the crossing with the transept, is a larger dome over pendentives, which has replaced the original one destroyed in the Protestant siege of 1568. Once lighted by two lantern towers, the transept has maintained only the northern one (Abadie also modified it, and moved the medieval sculptures to other locations), characterized by several orders of mullioned windows.

The semicircular choir is flanked by small apses and covered by a half dome.

== See also ==
- High medieval domes
