= Draze =

Zimbabwean-American hip hop artist

Draze is a Zimbabwean-American hip hop artist, songwriter, producer and social justice activist. He is known for blending traditional African sounds, marimba, and mbira with hip hop music. He won an Emmy Award in 2022.

== Background ==
Born Abraham Dumisani Maraire Jr., Draze was born in Seattle, Washington, United States. He is the son of Zimbabwean traditional music icon Dumisani Maraire and Lora Sukutai Chiorah-Dye, and the younger brother to Chiwoniso Maraire and Tendai Maraire.

== Career ==
Draze started his early career performing in his mother's Marimba band Sukutai and occasionally performed with his father's Marimba band Dumi & Minanzi Marimba Ensemble. As a child performer he travelled the United States opening for icons like Miles Davis, Janet Jackson and Jimmy Buffett. In 2016, Draze rose to prominence in response to his video release The Hood Ain't the Same, which targeted the issue of gentrification in the Central District of Seattle, WA (USA). The song became the lead single off the 50 Next compilation to commemorate the 50th anniversary of the Space Needle.

His music has featured on several TV shows, advertisements, and film including "The Main Thing" became the theme song for Angela Rye's show on Tidal, "Children of the Light" was also the theme song for the podcast "On One" with Angela Rye and other placements on Speedo, The Masked Singer, All American, The Last O.G., Ballers, Empire, Love and Hip Hop, ESPN SportsCenter, PlayStation, NFL Network, Absentia, NBA TV, The Rap Game, NFL Total Access and Black Ink Crew.

In 2020 Juneteenth, Draze launched a live Black Business Market show in partnership with Laila Ali and political analyst Angela Rye where Draze sat down with business owners and representatives of Black owned businesses to discuss their stories, products, and services. The show partnered with the Seattle Seahawks. He then released an economic anthem titled "Building Black Wealth," in which he spotlights 18 African American businesses.

Draze's "Through the Eyes of Art" partnership with the Museum of Pop Culture is one of the premier annual Black History Month celebrations in Seattle. He has been recognized by the Seattle chapters NAACP and Urban League as an emerging leader in the region.

In 2022, Draze along with Converge Media won an Emmy Award from the National Academy of Television Arts and Sciences for writing the theme song for their Morning Show. Draze's songs have been nominated for Best Hip-Hop Urban Track by MCPF Production Music Awards and 2016 Zim Hip Hop Awards Best Diaspora category.

== Discography ==
- Seattle Sweeties 2015
- Hood Ain’t The Same 2016
- Nice To Meet You 2016
- Seattle's Own 2016
- Born To Win 2021
- Ain’t Nobody Talking About No Real Shit
- Building Black Wealth feat. Owuor
- The Main Thing 2021
- Irony On 23rd 2021
