= Simon of Cramaud =

Catholic Patriarch of Alexandria and cardinal (d. 1423)

- Cardinal-Priest of San Lorenzo in Lucina
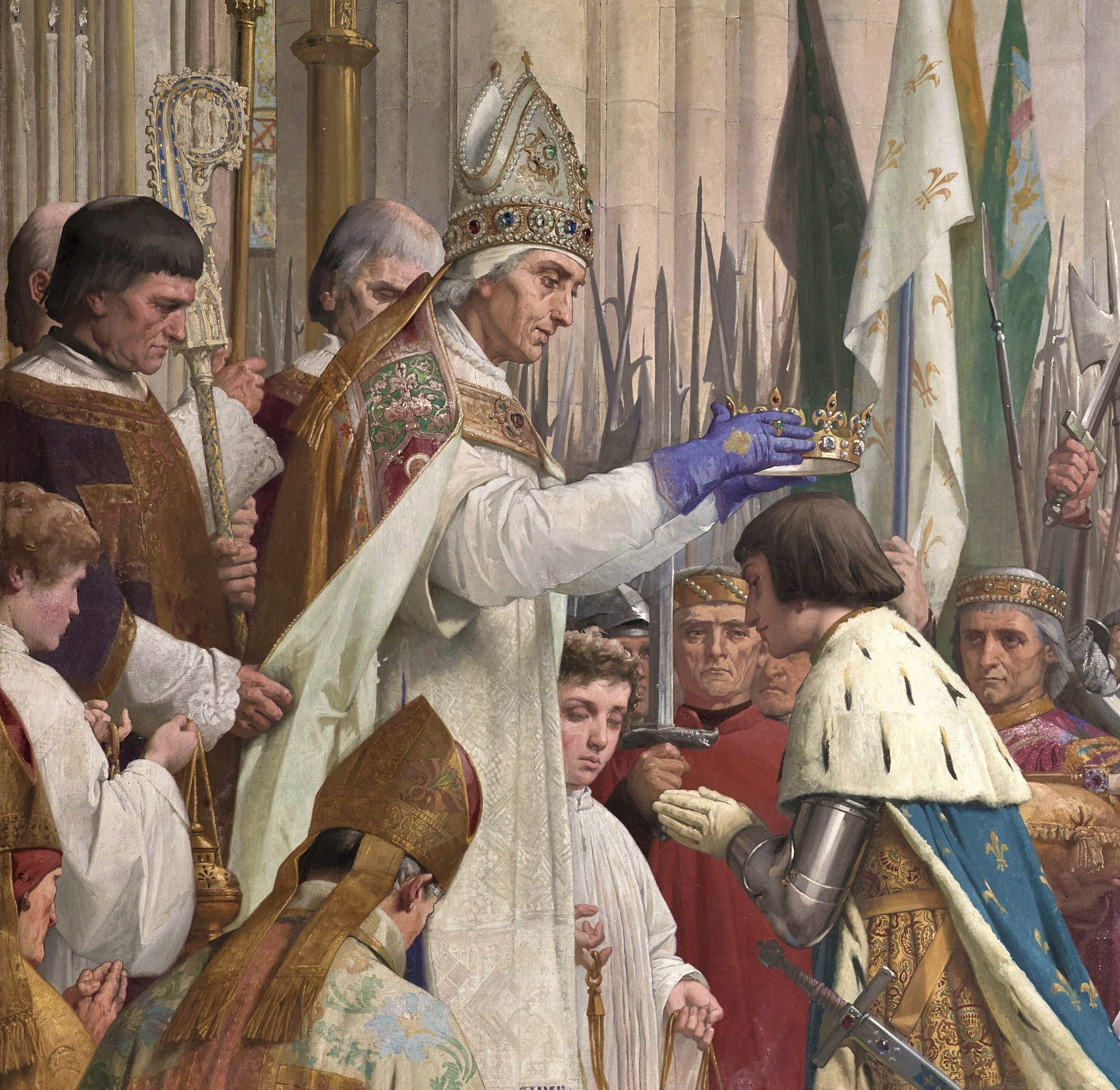
- The cardinal, crowning Charles VII of France; painting by Jules-Eugène Lenepveu
- Native name: Simon de Cramaud
- Church: Catholic Church
- See: San Lorenzo in Lucina
- In office: 12 May 1413 – c. 1423
- Predecessor: Luca Manzoli
- Successor: Jean de La Rochetaillée
- Other posts: Administrator of Poitiers (1413-c. 1423)
- Previous posts: Archbishop of Reims (1409-1413); Administrator of Carcassonne (1391-1409); Titular Patriarch of Alexandria (1391-1409); Administrator of Avignon (1391); Bishop of Poitiers (1385-1391); Bishop of Béziers (1383-1385); Bishop of Agen (1382-1383)

Orders
- Created cardinal: 13 April 1413 by Pope Gregory XII

Personal details
- Born: c. 1345 near Rochechouart, Duchy of Aquitaine, Kingdom of France
- Died: 19 January 1423 (aged 77–78) Poitiers, Duchy of Aquitaine, Kingdom of France

Simon de Cramaud (c. 1345 – 19 January 1423, in Poitiers) was a Catholic bishop, titular Latin Patriarch of Alexandria, and cardinal during the Great Western Schism of the fourteenth and fifteenth centuries.

== Biography ==
Simon was born before 1360 near Rochechouart, Haute-Vienne, a younger son in a family of minor nobles. He studied law at Orléans and became a well-known canonist. Simon taught canon law at the University of Paris, attracting the attention of John, Duke of Berry, one of the uncles of King Charles VI of France. As a counselor of the duke, Simon performed both administrative and diplomatic tasks. In 1382, he was appointed Bishop of Agen, but was transferred to Béziers in 1383, and finally to Poitiers in 1385. He was also appointed to Sens in 1390, but never occupied the see – instead he became the titular Latin Patriarch of Alexandria and Administrator of the Diocese of Avignon the following year. In 1409, he was made Archbishop of Reims and subsequently a cardinal in 1413. From then until his death, he served as the administrator of the Diocese of Poitiers.

Cramaud was a prominent figure in the struggles of the fourteenth-century church, and a partisan of the Avignon Papacy. He championed Avignon Pope Clement VII, but fought Clement's successor, Benedict XIII, any way he could. He presided at the Council of Pisa in 1409, and proclaimed the deposition of both Gregory XII and Benedict XIII, thus securing the election of Alexander V. At the Council of Constance, he was largely responsible for the success of its election method, which granted a vote to certain national delegates along with the cardinals. He is considered by some to be a precursor to both theological and political Gallicanism. Simon died on 19 January 1423. He was buried at the Poitiers Cathedral.

== Works ==
His treatise De substraccione obediencie (1397), offering multiple lines of reasoning for bringing the Schism to an end, was edited by Howard Kaminsky in 1984. Simon argued that Benedict's followers could withdraw obedience to compel him to seek a solution to the Schism.
