= Frank Ferko =

American composer

Frank Ferko (born June 18, 1950) is an American composer.

Born in Barberton, Ohio, Ferko played piano from childhood, and worked as an organist and conductor in his teens. His first compositions were primarily liturgical in nature, with Lutheran composer Richard Wienhorst being an early influence. He attended Valparaiso University as an undergraduate, where he studied composition and counterpoint under Wienhorst and organ under Philip Gehring. Ferko took particular interest in early music and the compositional and theoretical output of Olivier Messiaen.

He received a bachelor's from Valparaiso in 1972 in piano and organ performance, and then took his master's at Syracuse University in music theory. There he studied theory under Howard Boatright and organ under Will Headlee, and wrote his thesis on one of the extended piano works of Messiaen. Following this, Ferko served as Director of Music at various midwestern churches before entering Northwestern University. At Northwestern he first pursued a Ph.D. in music theory but shifted his attention to music composition which he studied under Alan Stout. During his time at Northwestern he worked as a teaching assistant in the School of Music and also continued his work as a church musician. In 1982 he began working as a music librarian and continues to work as both a librarian and an archivist. He currently works at the music library at the University of California, Berkeley.

As a composer, Ferko began receiving critical acclaim and commissions in the 1980s, including the Holtkamp Award from the American Guild of Organists in 1990 for the song cycle A Practical Program for Monks. In 1990-91 he composed a ten-movement cycle for organ based upon the visions of Hildegard von Bingen. It would be the first of several large-scale projects inspired by Hildegard, followed by The Hildegard Motets and Hildegard Triptych. Ferko premiered Stabat Mater in 1999, commissioned by His Majestie's Clerkes. He has also worked as composer-in-residence with the Dale Warland Singers. The European premiere of his choral works took place in April 2003 with a performance of his Stabat Mater by the VU-Kamerkoor, Amsterdam, on the occasion of which Ferko joined in rehearsals and held a public introduction to the piece. In 2004 the VU-Kamerkoor commissioned "La remontée des cendres," an extended work for chorus, soloists and an ensemble of eight instruments, based on texts by Tahar Ben Jelloun. The work received its premiere in The Netherlands, performed by the VU-Kamerkoor, conducted by Boudewijn Jansen in May 2005.

The music of Frank Ferko has been heard through public performance or radio broadcast in 30 countries on six continents.

== Recordings ==
- The Hildegard Organ Cycle (Arsis Audio, 1995)
- Motets (Arsis Audio, 1995)
- Stabat Mater (Cedille Records, 2000)
- Hildegard Triptych (Hyperion Records, 2011)
- Organ Music by Frank Ferko and Leo Sowerby (Cedille Records, 2021)
- Night: Music for Choir and Cello (includes Motet for Passion Sunday and Lord, Let At Last Thine Angels Come) (Herald, 2007)
- I Loved Lucy (includes Constellations for Flute/Alto Flute and Guitar) (Gasparo, 2000)
