= Georges Rol =

French Roman Catholic bishop

- Bishop of Angoulême
- Church: Catholic Church
- Diocese: Diocese of Angoulême
- In office: 1 July 1975 – 22 December 1993
- Predecessor: René-Noël-Joseph Kérautret
- Successor: Claude Dagens
- Previous posts: Titular Bishop of Gabii (1973-1975); Coadjutor Bishop of Angoulême (1973-1975)

Orders
- Ordination: 28 February 1953
- Consecration: 1 May 1973 by Jean-Baptiste Brunon

Personal details
- Born: 22 May 1926 Thiviers, Dordogne, France
- Died: 13 April 2017 (aged 90) L'Isle-d'Espagnac, Nouvelle-Aquitaine, France

Georges Rol (22 May 1926 – 13 April 2017) was a Roman Catholic bishop.

== Career ==
Ordained to the priesthood in 1953, Rol served as coadjutor bishop of the Roman Catholic Diocese of Angoulême, France, from 1973 to 1975. He then served as bishop on the diocese from 1975 to 1993.
