= Tarun Bhattacharya =

Indian classical musician

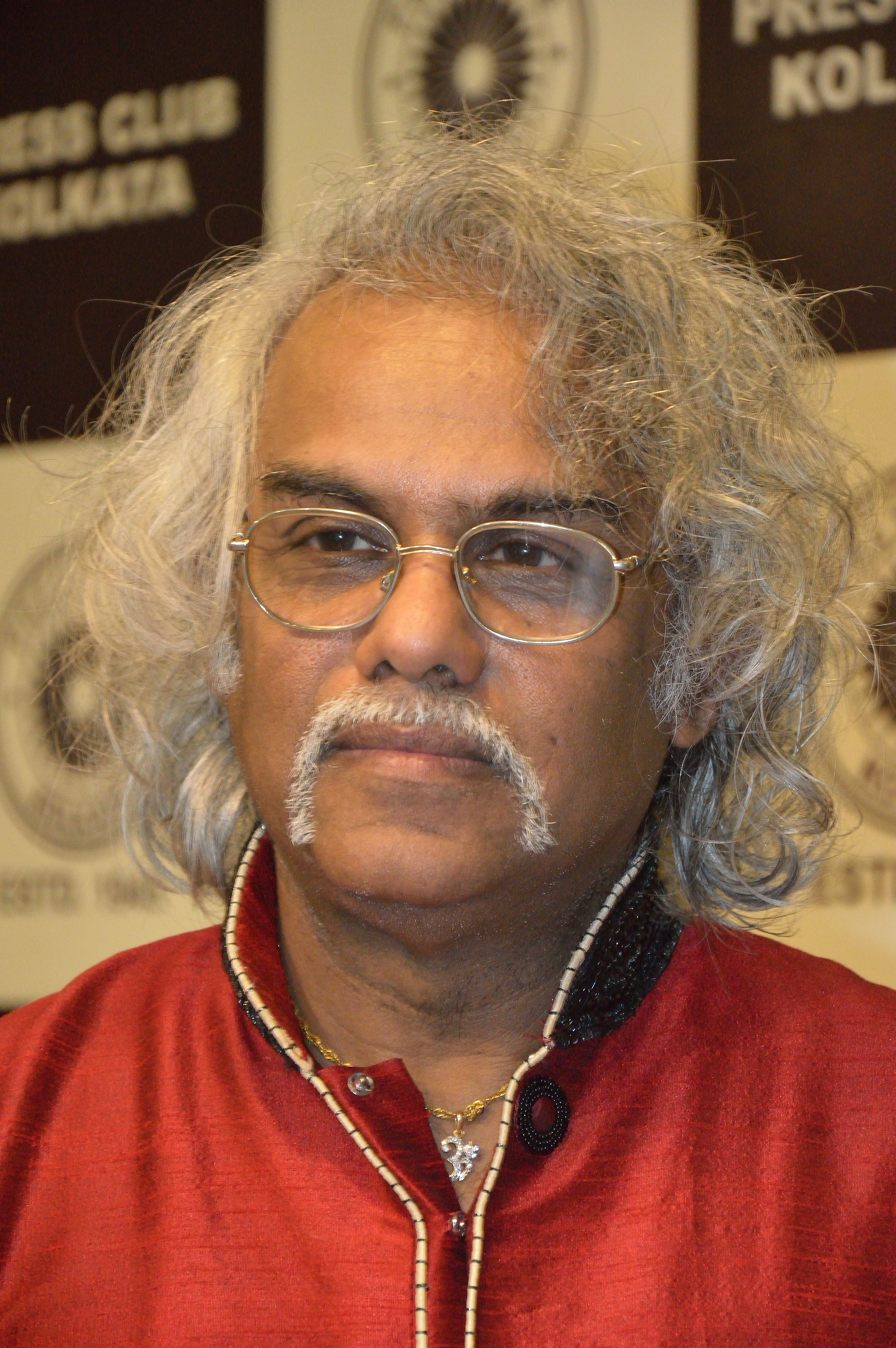
- Pt. Tarun Bhattacharya

Background information
- Genre: Indian classical music
- Instrument: santoor

Pandit Tarun Bhattacharya (born 23 December 1957) is an Indian classical musician who plays the santoor, a type of hammered dulcimer. He studied with Ravi Shankar. He was awarded the Sangeet Natak Akademi Award for 2018. He received the Padma Shri in arts in 2026.

== Early life ==
Tarun Bhattacharya was born on 23 December 1957 in Howrah (the twin city of Calcutta), India. He was a commerce graduate from one of the most reputed colleges of Calcutta, and after a few brief years of professional life he started learning music from his father, Rabi Bhattacharya. He later honed his skills under Dulal Roy and finally began learning under Ravi Shankar.

== Career ==
Bhattacharya is the inventor of "mankas" or fine tuners that help in quick tuning of the santoor. His technique of playing the santoor facilitates the playing of "Krintans, Ekharatans, Boltans" broadening the use of santoor in various traditional art forms. His improvisations on the shape and string arrangements have resulted in a deeper and more classical sound for the santoor.

He has endorsed the End Polio Now campaign of Rotary International as its ambassador. He has been recognized by the Indian National Polio Plus Committee both at the India Habitat Centre and the Calcutta Press Club for his role in promoting the cause.

An audio CD with a raga created by Tarun was released by the singer Girija Devi at the ITC Sangeet Research Academy in September 2017.

== Awards and citations ==
| 1 | Sangeet Mahasamman | Govt. of West Bengal |
| 2 | Best Critic Award | Germany |
| 3 | Grammy finalist 1997, "Kirvani", Music of the World | USA |
| 4 | 'Excellence in World Music', Music of the World | USA |
| 5 | Mahakal Samman | Madhya Pradesh, India |
| 6 | Surender Paul Award | Kolkata, India |
| 7 | Bhakti Kala Khetra Award | ISKON, India |
| 8 | Jadu Bhatt Award | Kolkata, India |
| 9 | Pt. Monmohan Bhatt Special Achievement Award | New Delhi, India |
| 10 | Vishnu Pad Alankaran Samman | Gaya, India |
| 11 | Rotary Vocational Excellence Award | District 3291, India |
| 12 | Rotary Peace & Goodwill Ambassador | Kolkata, India |
| 13 | Padma Shri | India |

== Discography ==
- Song of Nature, Flame of the Forest (1992) with Vishwa Mohan Bhatt on mohan veena and Ronu Majumdar on bansuri
- Essence of Jugalbandi (1993) with Ronu Majumdar
- Sargam (1995) (Music of the World)
- Kirvani (1996), featuring an original raga and three shorter pieces (Music of the World)
- Mental Bliss (1998), Bikram Ghosh, tabla
- Nomad Christmas (1997), various artists (Music of the World)
- Santoor (2000)
- Hypnotic Santoor (2001)
- Transcendence (2005)
- Aahir Bhairav & Gurjari Todi (2009) – Label: Questz World
- The Exotic Santoor (Reissued 2010)- Label: Aimrec – Available from Amazon.com
