= Marlyce Polk Reed =

Marlyce Rae Polk Reed (b 14 January 1955) is an American clarinetist and composer.

Reed earned a B. Mus. from the University of Wisconsin and a M. Mus from Northwestern University. Her teachers included Edward Brunner, Gloria Coates and Alan Stout. She married Stanley A. Reed in 1979.

Reed’s music is published by Seesaw Music Corp. and Shawnee Press.

== Works ==
Her works include:

=== Chamber music ===
- Brass Quartet
- Chromasia (alto sax and percussion)
- Clarinet Rhapsody No. 1
- Obtude (oboe)
- Sounds (oboe)
- String Quartet
- Three Short Dialogues (clarinet trio)
- Two Autumn Moods (tuba)
- Woodwind Quintet No. 1

=== Orchestral music ===
- Saxophone Concerto
- Shir Kadosh (boys choir and orchestra)

=== Vocal music ===
- A Dedication to My Father
- Art Song
- Love Come Take My Hand (mezzo soprano and flute)
- Piper’s Song (mezzo soprano; text by William Blake)
- Wedding Carillon (mezzo soprano and flute)
