= Pascal Wintzer =

French prelate of the Catholic Church (born 1959)

The Most Reverend Pascal Jean Marcel Wintzer
- Archbishop of Sens
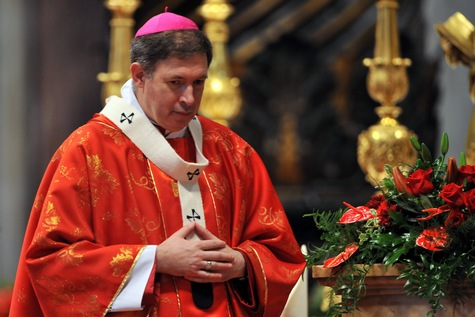
- Church: Catholic Church
- Archdiocese: Sens
- Appointed: 6 August 2024
- Installed: 6 October 2024
- Predecessor: Hervé Giraud

Orders
- Ordination: 27 June 1987 by Joseph Duval
- Consecration: 19 May 2007 by Albert Rouet

Personal details
- Born: 18 December 1959 (age 66)
- Denomination: Catholic
- Coat of arms

Pascal Jean Marcel Wintzer (born 18 December 1959) is a French prelate of the Catholic Church who has been archbishop of Sens since 2024. He was the archbishop of Poitiers from 2012 to 2024, after serving as apostolic administrator there for a year and as an auxiliary bishop from 2007 to 2011.

He was, at the time he took each rank, the youngest bishop and the youngest archbishop in France.

== Biography ==
Wintzer was born on 18 December 1959 in Rouen. After elementary and classical studies at the Saint-Évode Choir School attached to Rouen Cathedral and at the Jean-Baptiste de la Salle Institute, he studied for a year at the Faculty of Law of the University of Rouen-Mont-Saint-Aignan. Beginning in 1979 he studied at the seminary of Paray-le-Monial and the Saint-Sulpice Seminary of Issy-les-Moulineaux. He earned his licentiate in theology from the Faculty of Theology of the Institut Catholique de Paris. He was ordained a priest in Rouen on 27 June 1987 by Archbishop Joseph Duval.

He was deputy parish priest at Le Mesnil-Esnard (1987-1989); parish priest of Saint-André in Mont-Saint-Aignan and chaplain of the public high schools of Rouen (1989-1996); and spiritual director and teacher of theology at the Saint Sulpice Seminary of Issy-les-Moulineaux (1996-1999), while also teaching in 1998–99 in the Institute of Religious Studies at the Catholic Institute of Paris. He was then vicar general of Rouen and archdeacon of the Rouen Nord area (1999-2004); episcopal vicar for Rouen and Elbeuf, and parish priest of Rouen Cathedral. He was responsible for the diocesan Vocations Service from 1996 to 2005. From April 2006 to April 2007 he was vicar general again. He has been a member of the Academy of Sciences, Letters and Arts of Rouen since 2004.

Pope Benedict XVI appointed him auxiliary bishop of Poitiers and titular bishop of Rusadir on 2 April 2007. He received his episcopal consecration on 19 May 2007 from Albert Rouet, Archbishop of Poitiers. The co-consecrators were the archbishop of Rouen Jean-Charles Descubes and Archbishop Emeritus Joseph Duval of Rouen. Within the French Episcopal Conference he became president of the Faith and Culture Observatory, a position he continues to hold in 2024.

When Descubes retired on 12 February 2011, Wintzer was appointed the apostolic administrator of Poitiers. He was appointed the archbishop of Poitiers on 13 January 2012.

In March 2019, he became the first from the French Catholic hierarchy to support the idea of ordaining married men. Wintzer explained that ordaining married men would help the clergy to bring them back to "ordinary humanity", and saw it as a helpful tool in combating sexual abuse that exists among the parts of the Catholic clergy.

On 6 August 2024, Pope Francis transferred him to the Archdiocese of Sens. He was installed there on 6 October.
