= Heraclius (bishop of Angoulême) =

6th century Christian bishop in France

Heraclius (bishop c. 574–c. 580) was Bishop of Angoulême. The main source about his life is the Historia Francorum of Gregory of Tours.

== Bishop-elect of Saintes ==
Nothing is known of the early life of Heraclius. Gregory briefly mentions his service as a diplomat under Childebert I, King of Franks (reigned 511–558) He is first mentioned c. 562 as a priest in Bordeaux, involved in a religious dispute. Leontius II, Bishop of Bordeaux ordered the deposition of Emerius, Bishop of Saintes. Emerius had been appointed by charter of Chlothar I (reigned 511–561). Leontius argued that the appointment violated canon law and was thus void. He then summoned a local Synod to elect a new Bishop of Saintes. Heraclius was elected in the position and was sent to announce the decision to Charibert I (reigned 561–567). Heraclius' election was part of a wider agenda. During the 6th century the Merovingian kings and their representatives sought to appoint favourites to high-ranking positions in the Church. Meanwhile, the Bishops "held it to be a duty to oppose the King when he sought to meddle with Episcopal appointments". On several occasion electing their own candidates to office.

Heraclius first visited Eufronius, Bishop of Tours, attempting to gain his support. Eufronius simply refused. Heraclius got an even colder reception from Charibert himself. He took the decision as an insult to the memory of his father. Heraclius was the first to pay for this insult, punished severely. He was placed in a wagon covered with thorns and transported to exile. Leontius had to pay a fine of 1000 gold pieces, while the other participants in the synod paid fines determined by their level of wealth. Charibert took care to restore Emerius to his position. The scene has been seen at times as a show of filial loyalty. With Charibert honoring the decisions of deceased Clothar. Gary Johnson, however, pointed than on other occasions Charibert didn't hesitate to overturn such decisions. More likely than not, Charibert was acting to avenge an insult to royal authority itself. Emerius had been appointed by a king and deposed by a council. Said council had never bothered to consult Charibert before electing a new bishop. Instead they simply announced their decision to Charibert and expected him to acknowledge it. Had he done so, Charibert would have effectively resigned his authority over the Church. His actions confirmed that the final decision over appointments still rested with the reigning king.

== Bishop of Angoulême ==
The location and length of Heraclius' exile is unknown. He is next mentioned c. 580 when elected Bishop of Angoulême. His term was short and apparently troubled. His troubles directly related to the fates of his two immediate predecessors. The first of them was Marachar, former Count of Angoulême. Marachar had resigned his position to join the clergy. He served as Bishop of Angoulême for seven years. He is positively assessed by Gregory who mentions this Bishop building and furnishing several churches. He died poisoned. Frontonius, "who had planned and carried out this murder", immediately succeeded his victim as bishop. Only to die himself a year later. Heraclius succeeded him and before long had to contend with the new Count of Angoulême: Nantinus, nephew of Marachar.

Once appointed to his position, Nantinus started accusing Heraclius of harboring the murderers of his uncle. He placed the blame for the murder on the clergy serving under the Bishops. He proceeded to seize by force the estates which Marachar had left to the Church. His logic being that he could not allow the murderers to benefit from their crime. The quarrel between the Bishop and the Count turned violent, resulting at first in the deaths of "a number of laymen". The conflict escalated when Nantinus captured an unnamed priest and tortured him, trying to get him to confess the murder of Marachar. The victim died from loss of blood. Heraclius retaliated by excommunicating his enemy.

Their dispute was brought to a local synod at Saintes. Nantinus called for reconciliation, offering to do penance and restore Marachar's estates to the Church. Heraclius was reluctant to accept and had to be convinced by his fellow bishops. Heraclius' distrust of his enemy was justified. Nantinus proceeded to loot and demolish the various estates, only intending to cede their remains to Heraclius. The furious Heraclius had him excommunicated again. This was to be the last deed of Heraclius. He suddenly died with no stated reason. Nantinus soon was able to receive communion again, having convinced various bishops by means of flattery and bribe.

== Aftermath ==
Gregory completes the story with the death of Nantinus. The Count died a few months following his enemy, apparently of dysentery. At the height of his fever, Nantinus kept shouting that Heraclius was the one torturing him. He confessed to having wronged Heraclius before dying. Gregory uses this as a cautionary tale. The moral of the tale being that "all should take care not to offend their bishops, for the Lord will avenge His servants."

Gregory of Tours arguably vilifies Nantinus and his campaign of vengeance. Painting Heraclius as a hero. Charles De Paolo points that the story could be understood the other way around. With Heraclius as a corrupt bishop, harboring the murderers of his predecessor. Even profiting from the murder by claiming Marachar's estates. But Gregory views epidemic disease as evidence of devine dissatisfaction. In this case, Nantinus had transgressed against the Church. So Gregory sees his death from infectious disease as divine retribution. He similarly attributes the death of Frontonius to divine judgment. In a way, Gregory evaluates dysentery as evidence of moral corruption.

But a better look at the historical context of these events may shed a different light to this series of sudden deaths. In 580, there was a "plague outbreak" in Auvergne. The epidemic seems to have spread throughout Gaul. While varying symptoms are reported, this could be a dysentery epidemic.

== Sources ==
- Crabb, George (1833), Universal historical dictionary: or explanation of the names of persons and places in the departments of biblical, political and ecclesiastical history, mythology, heraldry, biography, bibliography, geography, and numismatics, Baldwin and Cradock
- De Paolo, Charles (2006), Epidemic disease and human understanding: a historical analysis of scientific and other writings, McFarland, ISBN 978-0-7864-2506-8
- Favreau, Robert. "Évêques d’Angoulême et Saintes avant 1200." Revue historique du Centre-Ouest 9, no. 1 (2010): 7–142.
- Martindale, John R.; Jones, A.H.M.; Morris, John (1992), The Prosopography of the Later Roman Empire - Volume III, AD 527–641, Cambridge University Press, ISBN 0-521-20160-8
- Rosmini, Antonio (1883), Of the Five Wounds of the Holy Church, Reed Books, ISBN 978-1-4086-1041-1
- Thorpe, Lewis; Gregory, Bishop of Tours (1974), The history of the Franks, Penguin Classics, ISBN 978-0-14-044295-3
