= Dumisani Maraire =

Zimbabwean musician

- Also known as: Dumi
- Born: Abraham Dumisani Maraire; 27 December 1944; Mutare, Rhodesia
- Died: 25 November 1999 (aged 54) Zimbabwe
- Occupations: Musician, singer-songwriter, producer
- Instruments: Vocals, mbira, marimba

Abraham Dumisani Maraire (27 December 1944 – 25 November 1999), known to friends as "Dumi", was a Zimbabwean musician. He was a master performer of the mbira, a traditional instrument of the Shona people of Zimbabwe. He specialized in the form of mbira called nyunga nyunga, as well as the Zimbabwean marimba. He introduced Zimbabwean music to North America, initiating a flourishing of Zimbabwean music in the Pacific Northwest that continues into the 21st century.

Maraire is credited for his famous 1–15 number notation used on the nyunga nyunga mbira and for notating the song "Chemutengure" on the nyunga nyunga mbira. The song "Chemutengure" is used to teach mbira learners the technique of playing the instrument.

== Biography ==
Maraire was born in Mutare, Rhodesia (now Zimbabwe). He began learning music from family members, and later at the college of music in Bulawayo. Maraire taught from 1968 through 1972 at the University of Washington in Seattle. He remained in Washington state until 1982, teaching at Evergreen State College in Olympia, Washington, giving private music lessons, and performing in cities of the Pacific Northwest and in British Columbia with several marimba groups he founded.

Maraire returned to Zimbabwe with his family in 1982 to develop an ethnomusicology program at the University of Zimbabwe in Harare. Four years later, he was back in Seattle, teaching and earning his own doctorate in ethnomusicology at the University of Washington, after which he returned again to teach at the University of Zimbabwe. He died of a stroke on 25 November 1999 in Zimbabwe.

== Legacy and children ==
Maraire has been credited with having "inspired thousands of Americans to explore Shona culture by building and performing on mbiras and marimbas, providing a vivid example with his own family". Some of his North American students created a Zimbabwean music festival (now called "Zimfest") which has taken place annually since 1991. Several of his children have also had successful musical careers. The late Chiwoniso Maraire was described as the "Zimbabwe mbira queen" and "a true ambassador of the Zimbabwean culture". Dumisani Maraire, Jr. performs under the stage name Draze; Tendai Maraire is part of hip hop duos Shabazz Palaces and Chimurenga Renaissance; and Zhiyanai Maraire performs as ZNi International.

== Discography ==
- Mbira Music of Rhodesia, performed by Abram Dumisani Maraire (1972). Seattle: University of Washington Press, Ethnic Music Series. Garfias, R. (ed.). 1 LP disc. 33 1/3 rpm. mono. 12 in. UWP-1001. This disc features Maraire exclusively on Nyunga Nyunga mbira. A 12-page booklet by Maraire is included, describing the background, composition, and performance of nyunga-nyunga mbira music.
- Dumi and the Marire Marimba Ensemble (1978-1979). Chiwoniso Music of Zimbabwe. OXO Studios, Seattle, WA..
- Chaminuka (1989). Dumi's first commercial recording on CD. Music of the World.
- Shona Spirit (1995). Dumisani Maraire & Ephat Mujuru. Music of the World. ASIN: B000003IT0. Amazon.com
- Pieces of Africa (1992). Kronos Quartet. Nonesuch UPC 075597927528 ASIN: B000005J15. Amazon.com
- Masters of the African Mbira (2000). Ephat Mujuru & Dumisani Maraire. A licensed compilation of various tracks from (Music of the World) recordings. Arc Music, ASIN: B00003ZL43. Amazon.com

== Publications ==
- Adzenyah, A. K., Tucker, J. C., & Maraire, D. (1997). Let Your Voice Be Heard! Songs from Ghana and Zimbabwe. World Music Press, ISBN 0-937203-75-0. Amazon.com
