= Heraclius Djabadary =

Georgian composer

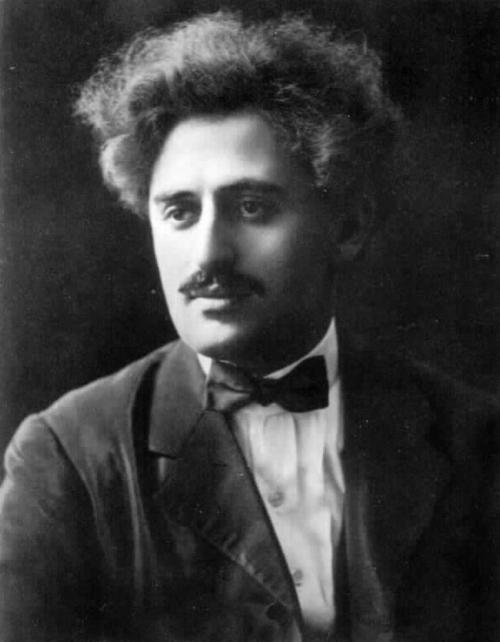
Heraclius Djabadary

Heraclius Alexandres dze Djabadary (French: Héraclius Djabadary, Georgian: ერეკლე ალექსანდრეს ძე ჯაბადარი, pseud. Amiran d'Alasany; 17 October 1891 – 18 August 1937) was a Georgian composer and pianist who was active throughout Europe up until the 1930s.

Djabadary was largely unknown in his homeland during his lifetime and was first discovered by Georgian audiences in the 1940s. His music is noted for its fusion of Western classical traditions with folk themes from Georgia, along with the eclectic sounds of the surrounding Caucasus region.

== Early life and education ==
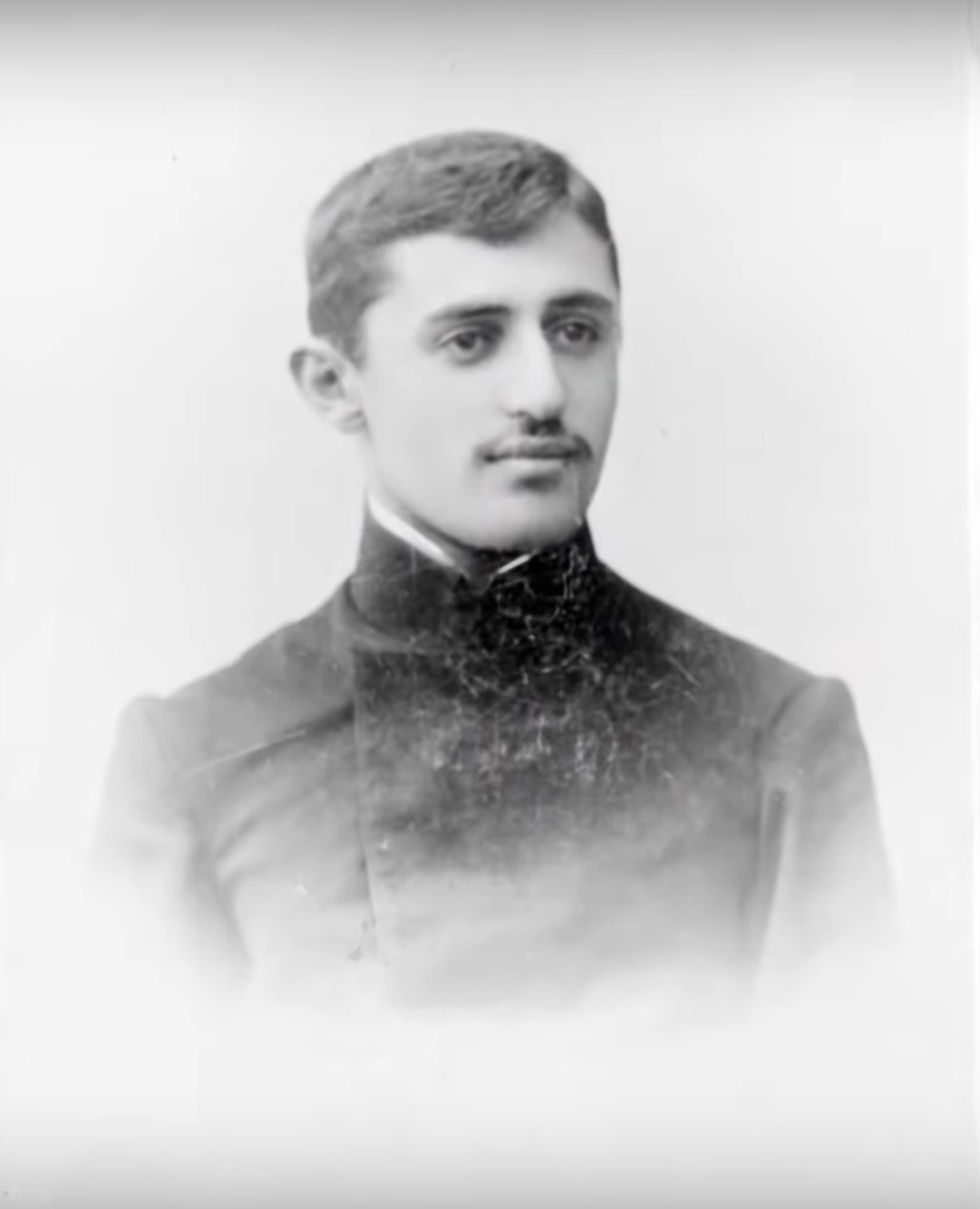
Heraclius in his youth

Djabadary was born on 17 October 1891 in Tiflis, the capital city of Georgia, then part of the Russian Empire. In 1905 he entered the Royal Conservatory of Brussels, where he studied under Arthur De Greef and François-Auguste Gevaert.

In 1909 he went to Vienna to study composition under the direction of Richard Heuberger and piano under Juliusz Wolfsohn. In 1913, he made his debut in Vienna as a concert pianist with the Tonkünstler Orchestra under the baton of Oskar Nedbal, performing the "Georgian Rhapsody" that Djabadary had composed, which was well received.

Later in 1913, he returned to Georgia and tried to make a musical career for himself there. However, after the Tsarist authorities decided to draft him into the Imperial Russian Army, which he despised, Djabadary had to leave the country again in 1915. After some time in France, Austria, and Switzerland, he settled in Paris in 1923, where gave a number of concerts, but after 1930 completely left the concert activity.

In 1936, under the pseudonym Amiran d'Alsany, Djabadary was part of ASCAP and SACEM.

Djabadary's significant works include the "Georgian Rhapsody for Piano and Orchestra", Piano Concerto in A major, Op. 10 (1921), "Song of the Serpent" (French: La Melopée du Serpent) for flute and orchestra Op. 19, "Tiflisiana" for oboe and orchestra Op. 26. He also authored an opera Gulnara (1919, based on Alexander Kazbegi), as well as a number of smaller compositions, such as the Nocturne in C minor and Variations on a Hungarian Chant for piano and cello.

== Personal life ==
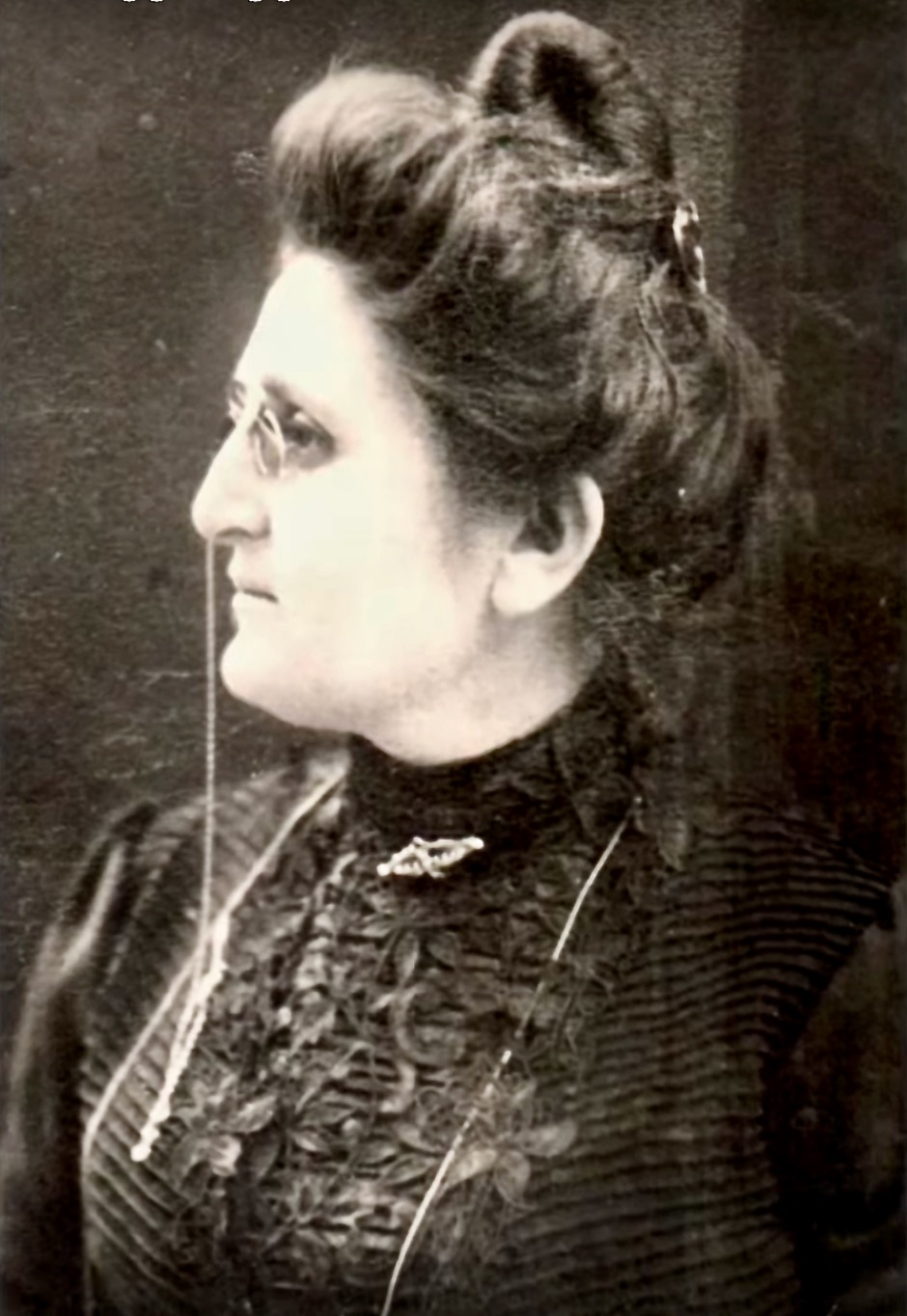
Composer's mother, Manana, a Georgian folk singer.

Djabadary was married to Margit Antonia Bárczy (1877-1934), a Hungarian aristocrat. Djabadary's Georgian Rhapsody was dedicated to her.

=== Death and legacy ===
Djabadary died of tuberculosis in Nice, France. After the composer's death, his brother Shota Djabadary promoted his music, publishing and performing orchestral arrangements of his piano pieces as a conductor. The revival of interest in the work of Djabadary is due to the pianist Henri Goraïeb, who recorded the Georgian Rhapsody and Piano Concerto together with the Luxembourg Philharmonic Orchestra conducted by Louis de Froment.

In 1967, 30 years after his death, Djabadary's remains were transferred from France back to his native Tbilisi and interred at the Didube Pantheon.

== Recordings and criticism ==
The American Record Guide has noted that Djabadary's Georgian Rhapsody "abounds in Oriental colour. Listening to this music we are literally transported back in time to the Georgia long ago." Described as the "most engaging" of Djabadary's works, the Georgian Rhapsody was favorably compared to the composer's lengthier Piano Concerto in A, which was less well received by some and has been characterized as "half-an-hour of filmish stuff". However, Djabadary's piano concerto has also received some praise, being described as "energetic" and "quite enjoyable, raising Djabadary to the level of a second-rate Saint-Saëns". Alongside Debussy's Soirée dans Grenade and Gershwin's An American in Paris, Djabadary's "Tiflisiana" has been cited as a vivid example of how history, geography, and local sounds inspire music.

In 1962, Aprelevka Record Plant released an LP (as Апрелевский Завод – 33Д—10477 and 10478) containing Meri Davitashvili's Fantasy-Concerto in B minor for piano and orchestra (with pianist Gulnara Kavtaradze) and Djabadary's Georgian Rhapsody with pianist Tinatin Gogolashvili, both were conducted by Zakhari Khurodze with the State Symphony Orchestra Of Georgia.

In 1980, Djabadary's Rhapsodie Géorgienne Pour Piano Et Orchestre Op. 2 (Georgian Rhapsody), La Mélopée Du Serpent Op. 19 (The Serpent's Melody), Tiflisiana Op. 26 (Tbilissiana), and 3rd Piano Concerto in A major Op. 10 were recorded by Louis de Froment conducting the Orchestre Symphonique de RTL with pianist Henri Goraieb, and released under Voxigrave (as Voxigrave V/30/ST 7240) in 1981, Qualiton by 1988, and Quantum (as Quantum QM 6915) in 1991.

In 1984, cellist Pierre Strauch and pianist Gérard Nougarol recorded for the Heraclius Djabadary Society pieces for cello and piano, this included:

- Lied in E (Op. 3, No. 1)
- Caprice in B-flat minor (Op. 3, No. 3)
- "Les moments vécus":
  - Guiguitte/Caprice in E (Op. 6, No. 2)
  - Réminiscences in G minor (Op. 6, No. 1)
  - A.E.K Enigma in F minor (Op. 22)
  - Caprice for the Right Hand alone in B-flat minor (Op. 19-bis)
  - Nocturne in C minor (Op. 14)
- Sur la tombe de Margit Antonia Bárczy in E minor (Op. 30)
- Regrets in F minor (Op. 24)
- Variations sur un chant Hongrois in G minor (Op. 23)

This recording was released by Qualiton under ST 7421.

== See also ==
- Music of Georgia (country)
- Victor Dolidze
