= Albert Rouet =

French Catholic bishop (born 1936)

Albert Jean-Marie Rouet (born 28 January 1936) was the Bishop of Poitiers since 1994 and archbishop of the same episcopal see since 2002. According to the Vatican Information Service (VIS), he resigned for reasons of age on Saturday, February 12, 2011, having reached the age limit of 75 at which all bishops are invited to submit their letter of resignation to the Pope.

He served earlier as Vicar General for Paris. He is considered to be a leader in the liberal wing of the French bishops.
