= Ephat Mujuru =

Mbira player of Shona Zimbabwean music

Ephat Mujuru (1950–2001), was a Zimbabwean musician, one of the 20th century's finest players of the mbira, a traditional instrument of the Shona ethnic group of Zimbabwe.

== Biography ==
Although Mujuru played all of Zimbabwe's five types of mbira, he specialty was the mbira dzavadzimu.

Ephat Mujuru was raised in a small village called Dewedzo, in Manicaland, near the Mozambican border, and was taught to play the mbira by his grandfather, Muchatera Mujuru. Muchatera was a medium for one of the most important ancestor spirits in Shona cosmology, Chaminuka. Showing clear talent for the rigours of mbira training, Ephat advanced quickly, playing his first possession ceremony when he was just ten. At his Rhodesian-run Catholic school, young Mujuru's teachers told him that to play mbira was a "sin against God." This irritated Muchatera so much that he withdrew his grandson and sent him to school in an African township outside the capital, Salisbury, present day Harare.

In the big city, Mujuru hesitated before committing himself to the life of a musician. He recalled in a 1994 interview, "I worked in an accounting office. But the people there were very colonial. They had so much hate on. They didn't respect African people." Amid excuses, the office ultimately fired Mujuru. "It was sad," he said, "Because I thought life was beginning, and then I had no job. I was eighteen and very confused."

All along, Mujuru says that there was a "silent voice" telling him that his hope lay in mbira music. Following that voice, Mujuru began spending time in the village of Bandambira, where he studied with a great old mbira player of the same name. In the highland corn fields near Mhondoro, beneath Zimbabwe's big skies full of large birds, battleship clouds, and horsetail sunsets, Mujuru reaffirmed his ties to the mbira. Soon, he went to live and apprentice with another master player, Simon Mashoko.

Soon, Mujuru's path became clear—to follow in the footsteps of Muchatera Mujuru, Mubayiwa Bandambira, and Simon Mashoka. "They had respect," said Mujuru emphatically. "They were not as rich as those accounting people, but they were much happier."

In 1972, Mujuru formed his first group, Chaminuka, the group he performed with throughout the brutal decade of the independence war. In this period, Mujuru managed to get national radio play for a slyly political song. "How can I cross the river?" asked the song "Guruswa," which means ancient Africa in Shona. Perhaps Rhodesian radio programmers heard only quaint nostalgia in the song, but future Zimbabweans got the message. "It was talking about our struggle to free ourselves." explained Mujuru. "We wanted the place to be like it was before colonization."

In the context of war, the mbira became political. Thomas Mapfumo transposed mbira music onto electric instruments to create chimurenga music, named for the chimurenga guerillas. Mujuru says, "When we played mbira, people would come and dance with a special feeling. `Hey, we are going to be independent!'" Sadly, by the time the war was won, Mujuru's grandfather Muchatera, had become one of its victims. He was executed by guerillas who thought his bira ceremonies were directed at achieving peace, rather than victory.

Mujuru played all of Zimbabwe's five types of mbira, but his specialty is the popular mbira dzavadzimu. Where mbira can have from fifteen to fifty iron prongs, the mbira dzavadzimu has twenty-two, arranged in three register banks that Mujuru characterizes as "voice of the children, voice of the adults, and voice of the elders." The prongs, often made from flattened bed springs, get clamped tightly onto a laminated slab of hard Mubvamaropa wood. Mbira makers often attach shells or bottle caps to the mbira's tin shield to produce a resonating buzz that complements the chiming character of the notes. For amplification, players use sticks to jam the instrument into a large, halved calabash that serves as a resonating chamber.

Like any serious mbira player, Mujuru had mastered a large repertoire of traditional songs. But he was also a prolific composer, with many original titles and unique interpretations of traditional songs to his credit. Apart from his musical prowess, Mujuru was an inspirational story teller. Over the years, he transformed the venerable art of telling allegorical tales for children into a personalized narrative and musical form that conveyed both wisdom and delightful humor to adults and children alike. In one story, a hyena confronted with a dead cow and a dead goat cannot decide which to eat first, and dies of starvation while pacing greedily back and forth between the two prizes.

After Zimbabweans ultimately gained independence on April 18, 1980, the work of building a new nation began. Renaming his group Spirit of the People, Mujuru recorded his first album in 1981, using only mbira, hand drums, hosho, and singers. He sang about brotherhood and healing, crucial themes during a time when the nation's dominant ethnic groups, the Shona and Ndebele, struggled to work out their differences.

Independence and a measure of commercial success brought new possibilities for Mujuru. He helped to found the National Dance Company and became the first African music teacher to teach ethnomusicology at the top western classical tradition Zimbabwe College of Music. In 1982, Mujuru came to the US for the first time to study and, eventually, lecture and teach mbira at the University of Washington in Seattle. Throughout the 1980s, Mujuru traveled widely, returning to Zimbabwe to record two more traditional albums. In the United States, he released an album of traditional hand drumming, Rhythms of Life (Lyrichord), recorded in Boston in 1989, with a few mbira tracks added from an earlier vinyl release on Lyrichord.

During the 1990s, Mujuru continued to travel and perform, and in the United States, he recorded two albums for Music of the World. Ancient Wisdom is a solo recording, and Shona Spirit is a collaboration with another of Shona music's great international ambassadors, Dumisani Maraire. Mujuru also recorded an ambitious, multi-track album he called Journey of the Spirit, which has yet to be released. Back in Zimbabwe, he also released successful pop albums with a revamped, electric version of Spirit of the People. In 1992, Mujuru's first electric album Hapana Mutorwa made its way to the top of the local charts, edging out Zimbabwe sungura kings Leonard Dembo and John Chibadura. But as conditions worsened in Zimbabwe, Mujuru traveled and recorded less. When Afropop Worldwide last interviewed him in March, 2001, he had just finished two new recordings, one acoustic, traditional session, and one with a new band, members of a Zimbabwe rumba outfit called Eden Boys. In early September, the electric album, Musiyano, was released and got a very positive review in The Daily News in Zimbabwe, under the heading, "Mujuru back with a bang." Mujuru seemed poised for a genuine comeback. But less than a month later, on October 5, he died in London, while traveling with his cousins Fradreck and Sam. He was on his way to begin a residency at Grinnell College in Iowa. Sadly, Ephat Mujuru suffered a massive heart attack that day in Gatwick Airport and died on his way to a hospital.

Several of Mujuru's children are professional musicians, most notably mbira master James Mujuru, who is continuing his father's musical legacy. Currently based in Harare, he has lived and work extensively in North America.

== Discography ==
- Mbavaira" 1983 Gramma Records ZML 1013
- Rhythms Of Life (Lyrichord)
- Shona Spirit: Mbira Masters From Zimbabwe (Music of the World)
- Ancient Wisdom: Songs And Fables From Zimbabwe
- Masters Of The African Mbira
- Journey of the Spirit (Alula Records)

During the late 90s, Mujuru was part of facilitators at the National Indigenous Music Festivals hosted by Mambo Arts Commune in Botswana. His last visit to Botswana was in August 2001 at Shoshong Senior Secondary School.
