= Henri Goraïeb =

Lebanese musician (1935–2021)

Henri Goraieb
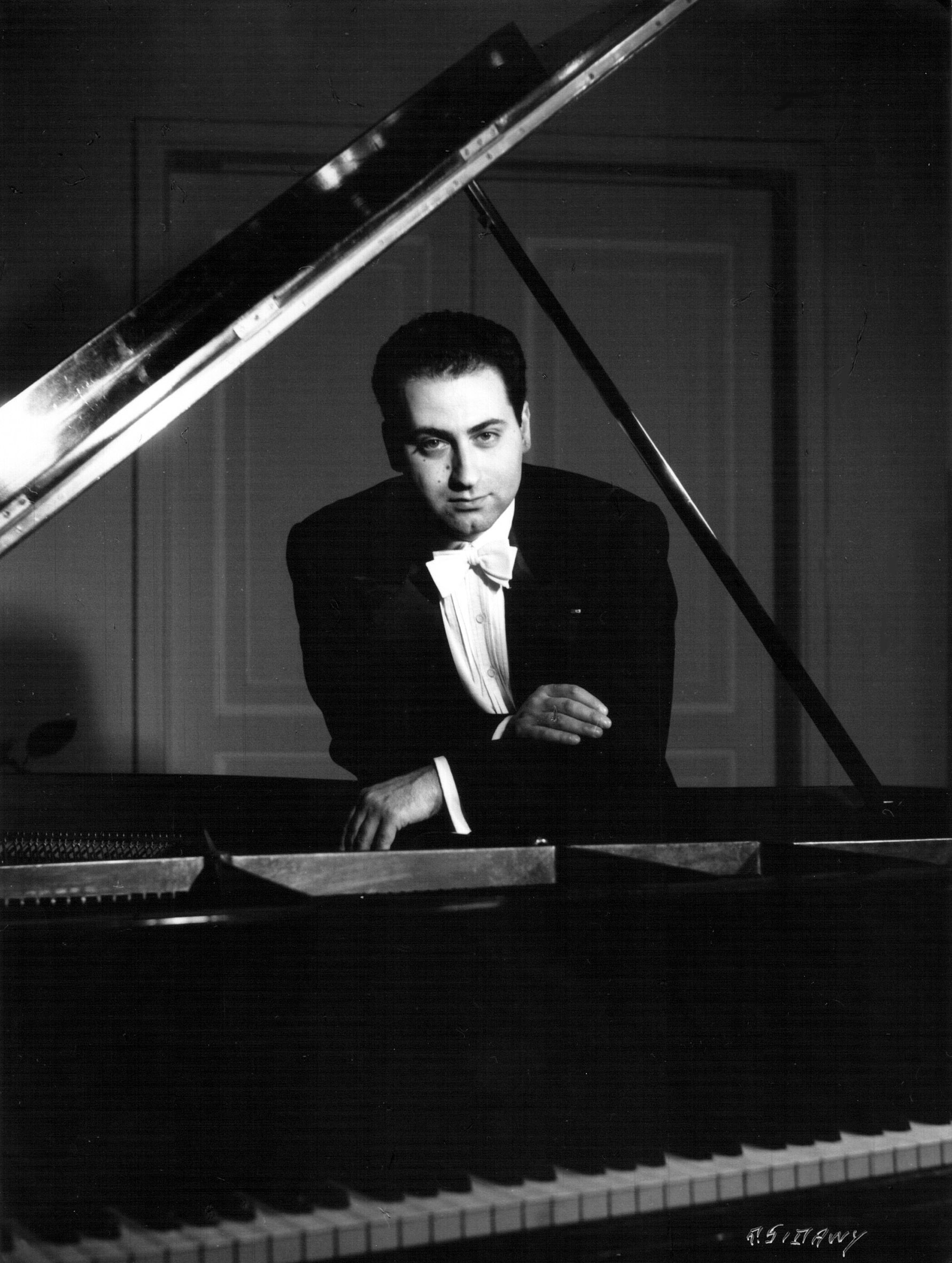
- Born: 9 May 1935; Deir al-Qamar, Mandate for Syria and the Lebanon
- Died: 13 January 2021 (aged 85)
- Occupation: Musician

Henri Goraieb (9 May 1935 – 13 January 2021) was a Lebanese pianist, musician, and radio host.

== Biography ==
Goraieb was born on 9 May 1935, in Deir al-Qamar, a small Christian village in Lebanon, to a French mother and Lebanese father. He started practicing music at the age of six, and first performed onstage in Tripoli when he was 13. In the 1950s, he studied at the Conservatoire de Paris under the tutelage of Marguerite Long and Germaine Mounier. Lebanese President Camille Chamoun was present at his first concert in Beirut in 1955. Subsequently, he pursued a concert career throughout Europe, from Rome to Moscow. He performed with groups such as the Luxembourg Philharmonic Orchestra, the Orchestre National de France, the George Enescu Philharmonic Orchestra, and the Jean-Francois Paillard Chamber Orchestra.

Goraieb was the first Lebanese artist to be invited to the Théâtre des Champs-Élysées as a soloist as part of the Mardis de la RTF program. In the early 1980, he became a radio host on the France Musique program Les Archives lyriques. After he suffered a stroke in the early 2000s, he returned to the piano in 2005. His final public concert took place in Beirut on 11 November 2018 with a performance of Mozart's Piano Concerto No. 13.

Henri Goraieb died on 13 January 2021, at the age of 85.
