= De Thou =

De Thou may refer to:

- Jacques Auguste de Thou (1553–1617), French historian, book collector and president of the Parlement de Paris
- François Auguste de Thou (1607–1642), French magistrate, a councillor to the parliament of Paris in 1626, a conseiller d'État shortly afterwards, eldest son of Jacques-Auguste de Thou
