= Kouxian =

General Chinese term for any variety of jaw harp

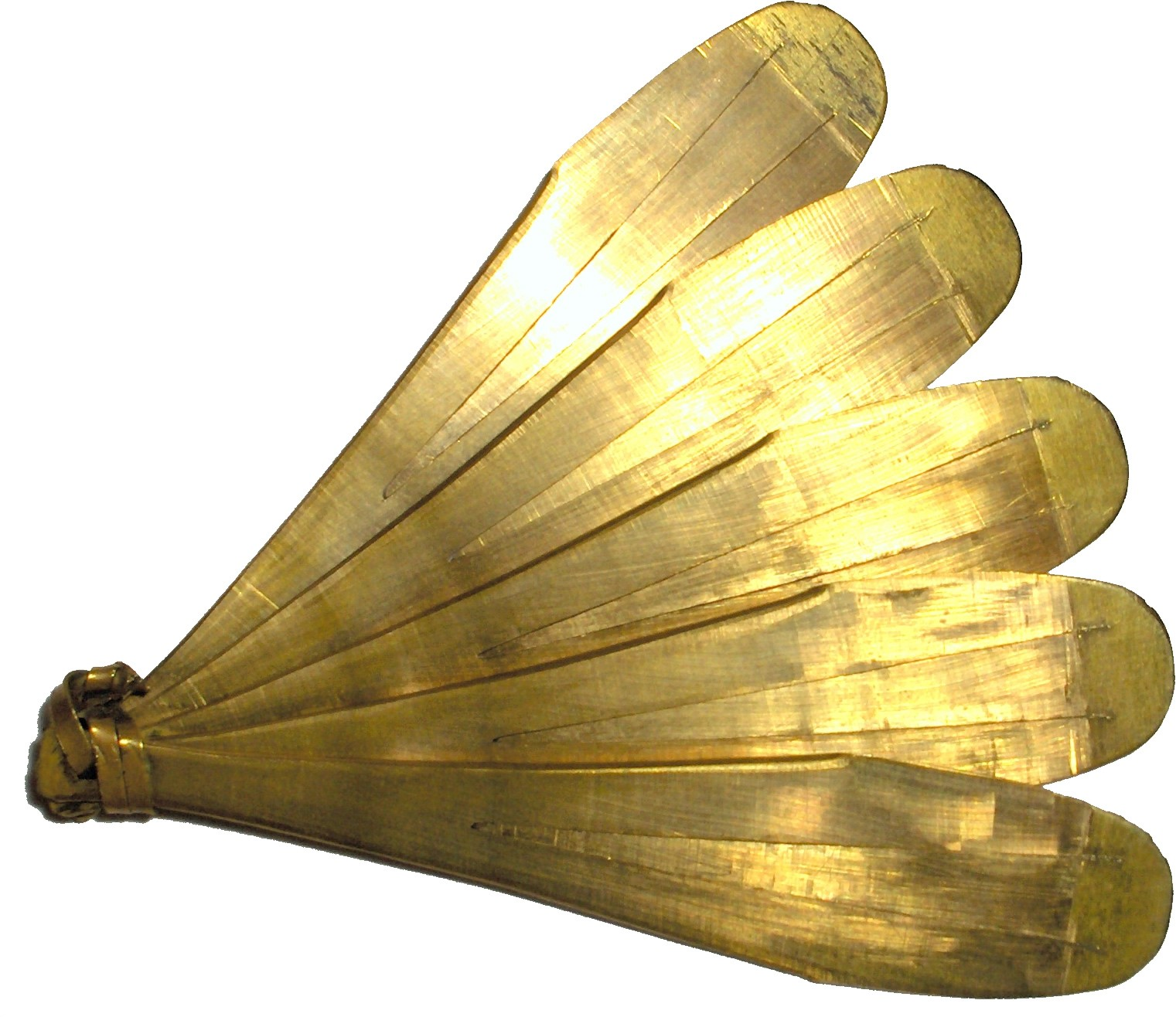
- A five-leaf kouxian
- Classification: Lamellaphone; plucked idiophone
- Hornbostel–Sachs classification: 121.2 (A plucked idiophone in which the lamella is mounted in a small frame; the player's mouth serves as a resonance chamber.)

Related instruments
- Đàn môi, gogona, kubing, morsing

Kouxian (Chinese: 口弦; pinyin: kǒuxián; lit. 'mouth string') is a general Chinese term for any variety of jaw harp. The jaw harp is a plucked idiophone in which the lamella is mounted in a small frame, and the player's open mouth serves as a resonance chamber.

Chinese jaw harps may comprise multiple idiophones that are lashed together at one end and spread in a fan formation. They may be made from bamboo or a metal alloy, such as brass. Modern kouxian with three or more idiophones might be tuned to the first few tones of the minor pentatonic scale.

The jaw harp likely originated in Asia. The oldest jaw harps are dated to 4000 BCE, and are from the Neolithic sites at Shimao.Although played throughout China, it is particularly popular among the non-Han ethnic groups of Southwest China, such as those in Yunnan, Guangxi, and Guizhou. The varieties of Chinese have numerous vernacular names for the instrument; one such name is hoho.
