= Gogona =

Assamese jaw harp

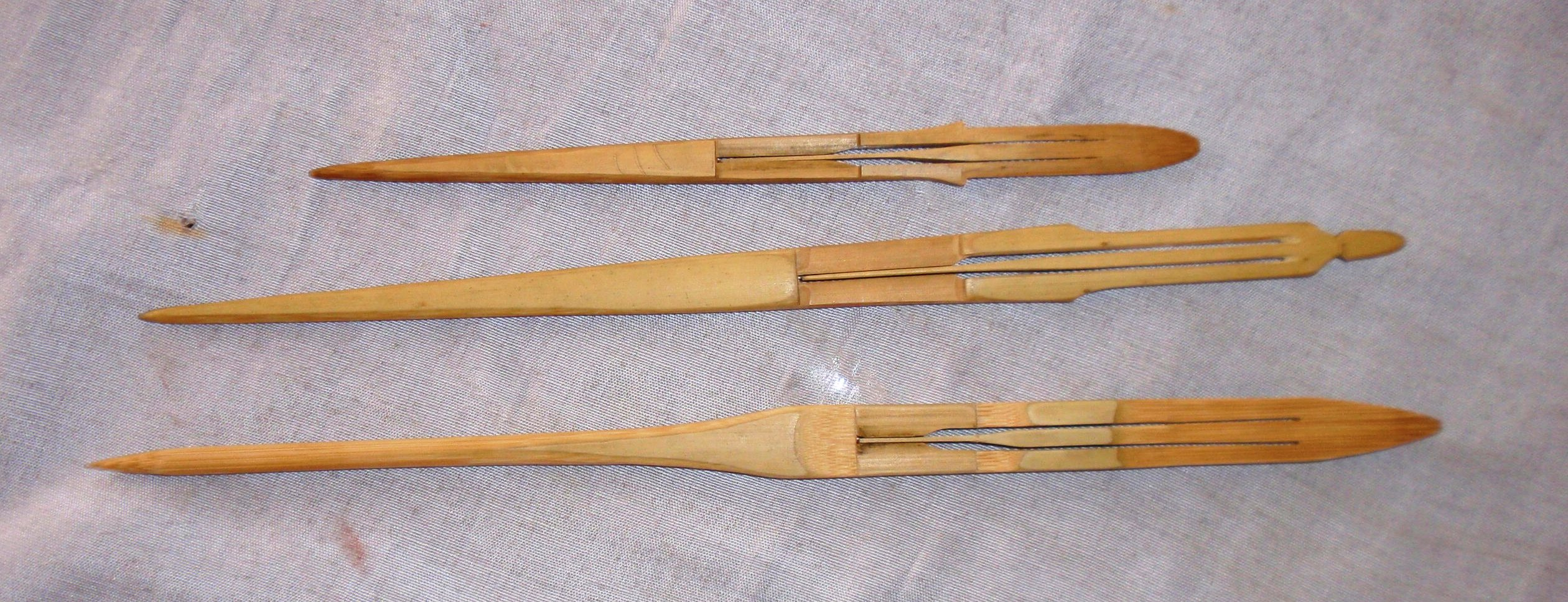

Related instruments
- Đàn môi (Vietnam); Kouxian (China); Angkouch (Cambodia); Binayo (Nepal)

The gogona is a jaw harp, a vibrating reed instrument that is used primarily in the traditional Bihu music in Assam, India. In Boro language, it is known as Gongina.. It is made of a piece of bamboo/horn that has a bifurcation on one end. The solid end is gripped with the teeth and the free ends are then struck repeatedly with the fingers to emit the distinctive sound of the gogona.

There are two main types of gogona:

- Ramdhan Gogona : This type is played by men. It is designed to be shorter, wider, and slightly heavier to fit properly in a man's hand. Traditionally, it is often tucked into a tongali (waist tie) or a gamusa (head cloth) while performing.
- Lahori Gogona : Crafted to fit a woman's hand, the Lahori Gogona is slightly slimmer and longer than the Ramdhan Gogona. Women typically tuck it into their hair knot while dancing Bihu. During Bihu celebrations, women are often seen adorning the Lahori Gogona as a hairpin, especially in the initial stages of the festivities when they dance to the rhythms of the dhol and pepa drums.

== See also ==
- Angkuoch (Khmer: អង្គួច), Cambodia
- Bihu
- Dhol
- Jew's harp
- Lamellophones
- Music of Assam
- Pepa
- Taal
