= Hugu (instrument) =

Insect used as a musical instrument

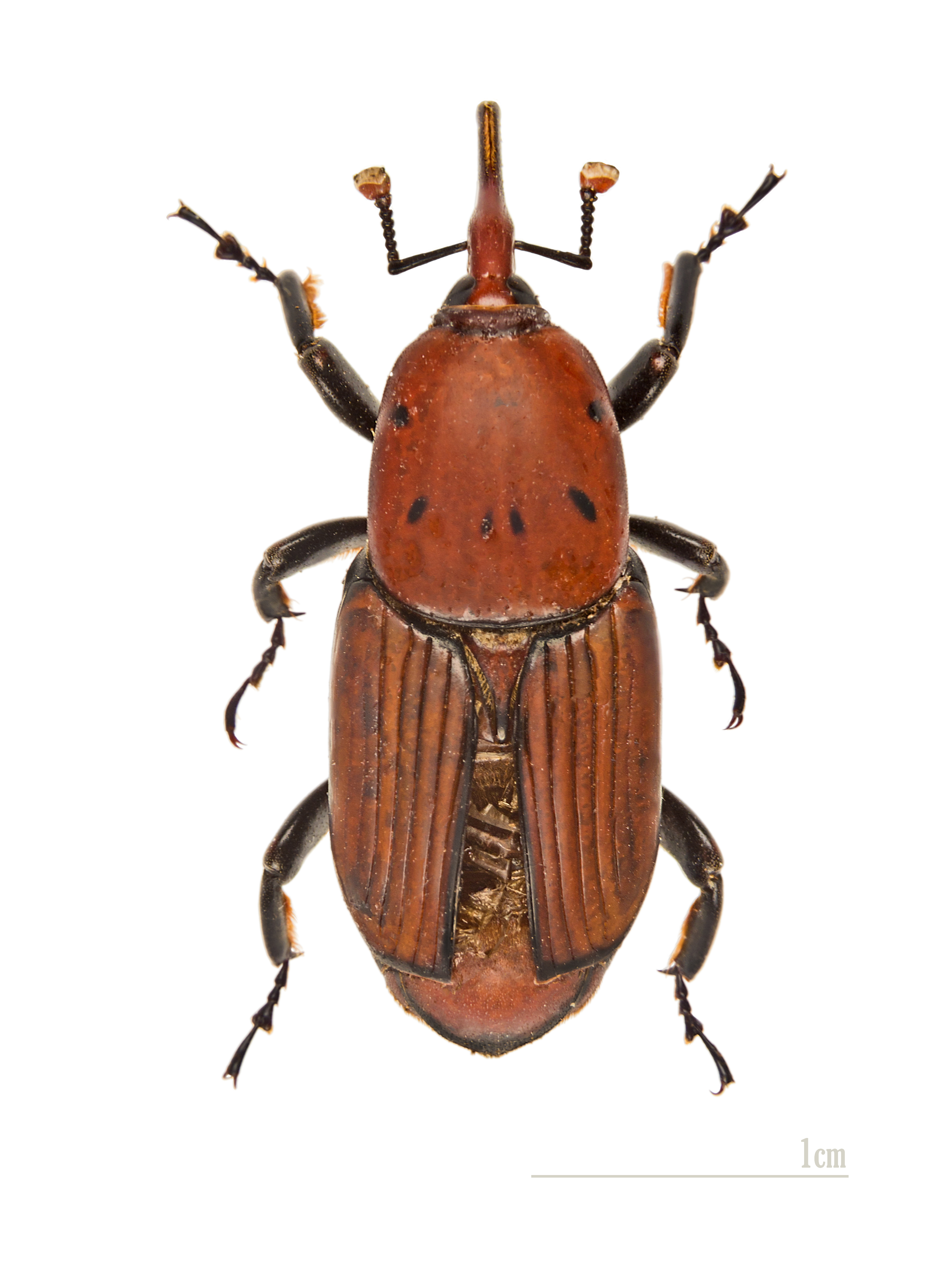

Other instrument
- Developed: as a local custom, among Onabasulu people of southern highlands of Papua New Guinea, and the Telefomin area

A hugu is a sago-palm weevil (Rhynchophorus ferrugineus) in Papua New Guinea that has been used by men of the Onabasulu people as a musical instrument. The musicians pin the beetle onto a sharpened stick and hold the beetle up to their mouths, spinning the stick and beetle. If they do this during daylight, the beetle will beat its wings and provide a buzzing sound. The musicians' mouths act as a variable resonance chamber, in the same way as it does for a musician playing a Jew's harp or musical bow. By opening and closing their mouths and changing the shape, musicians can raise and lower the pitch, and make the music louder or softer.

This technique has been documented and made available by ethnomusicologists.
