= Angkuoch =

Cambodian jaw harp

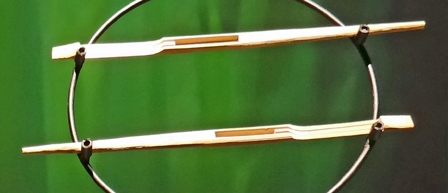
- Two examples of an angkuoch made from bamboo
- Classification: Lamellophone

The angkuoch (Khmer: អង្គួច) is a Cambodian jaw harp (sometimes known as mouth harp or Jew's harp). It is a folk instrument made of bamboo or iron.

The bamboo version is carved into a long, flat shape with a hole in the center and a tongue of bamboo across the hole. The bamboo tongue is not removable, which makes the instrument an idioglot. The metal variety is more round or tree-leaf shaped. It may also have metal bells attached.

The angkuoch is, in a sense, both a wind instrument and percussion instrument. As a wind instrument, it is played by placing it against the mouth; percussively, it is played by plucking the reed. These two actions happen simultaneously in playing. The hand holding the instrument holds it with the thumb and forefinger facing each other, holding it firmly. This adds mass to the instrument and makes it louder. The mouth acts as a resonator and as a tool to alter the sound.

Although mainly a folk instrument, some angkuoch (the plural form) are better crafted than is considered common for folk instruments.

== Social context ==
The instrument was thought to be the invention of children herding cattle, and is often used in private contexts for the entertainment and enjoyment of its player. It is also sometimes used in public performance, to accompany Mahori music in public dancing.

Social and cultural shifts in Cambodia over the last half-century, including the consequences of the Khmer Rouge genocide in the 1970s, mean that very few people still know how to make and play the instrument. In 2020, there was believed to potentially be only one remaining proficient maker of the rarer iron angkuoch: a man in his 70s called Bin Song, living in Siem Reap Province.

== Documentation ==
In 2020, the angkuoch was the subject of an international documentation project funded by the Endangered Material Knowledge Programme of the British Museum. Led by Australian music researcher Catherine Grant in collaboration with a Cambodian team, the project documented the making of the bamboo and iron angkuoch as practised in Siem Riep province, Cambodia.

Outcomes included several hours of video documentation, hundreds of photographs, interview transcripts, and a 20-minute video documentary. All project assets are freely available on the project webpage of the British Museum's digital repository.

== Museum holdings ==
Until 2020, the British Museum had one angkuoch in its collection, a bamboo instrument made in the 1960s.

During the British Museum project, the project team purchased two angkuoch directly from their makers in Siem Reap province, using project funds. These instruments were sent to the Endangered Material Knowledge Programme, which gave the objects to the British Museum's Asia Department to add to its holdings.

== See also ==
- Gogona, instrument of nearby Assam, with a very similar appearance
- Jew's harp, the generic instrument group to which angkuoch belongs
- International Jew's Harp Society
