= Srirangam Kannan =

Indian musician and artist (1952–2024)

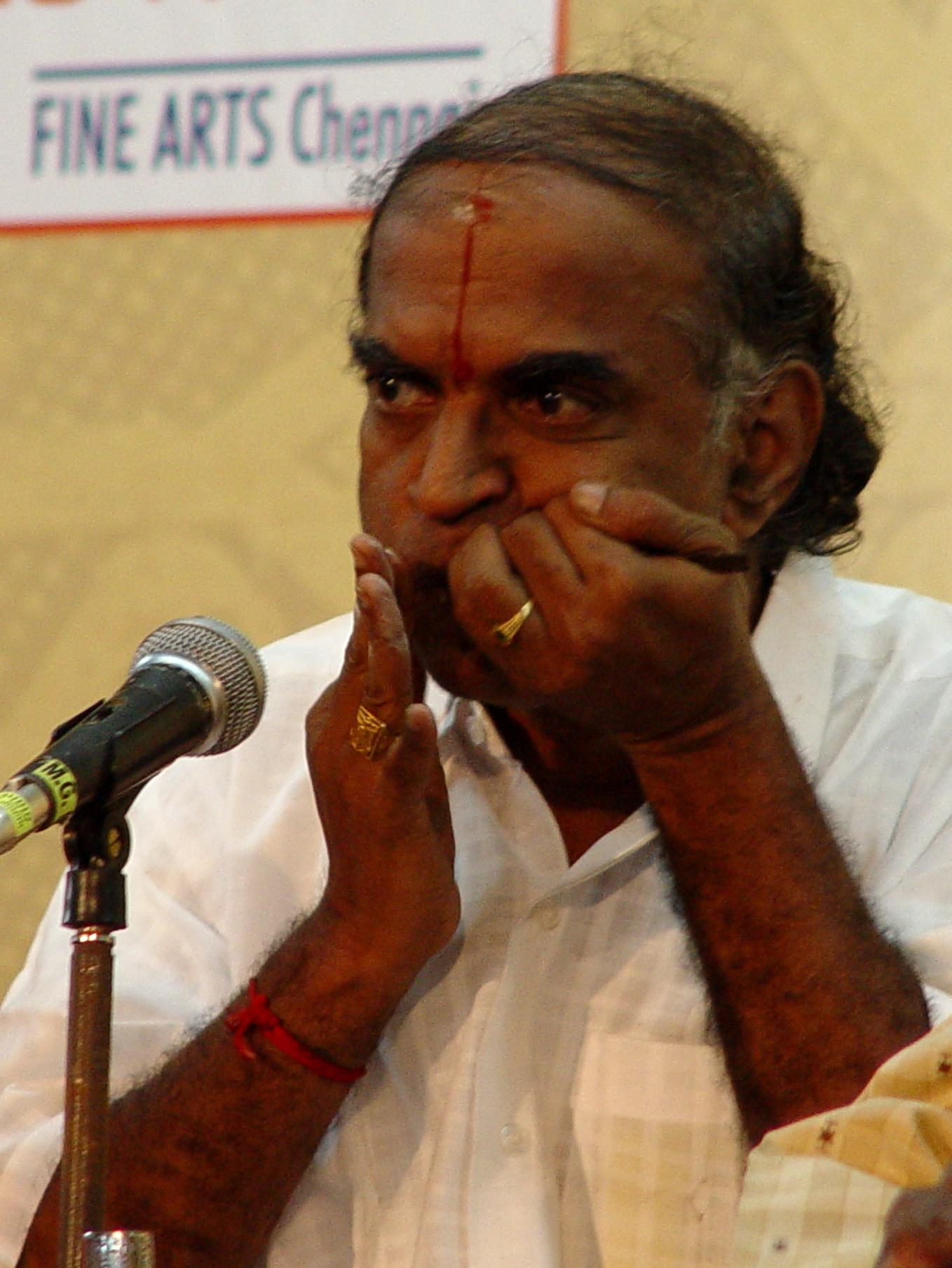
- Kannan in 2007

Background information
- Born: 5 May 1952; Srirangam, Tiruchirappalli district, Madras State (now Tamil Nadu), India
- Died: 20 September 2024 (aged 72) Chennai, Tamil Nadu, India
- Genres: Indian classical music; parody
- Instrument: Morsing
- Years active: 1968–2024

Srirangam Kannan (5 May 1952 – 20 September 2024) was an Indian musician and artist, known for playing the morsing.

== Life and career ==
Vidwan Srirangam S. Kannan was born on 5 May 1952 in Srirangam to K. Sathyamurthy and Kamalam. Growing up, he had little experience with Carnatic music.

When he was 19 years old he heard a concert where Sri Pudukkotai S. Mahadevan played the morsing. Shortly afterwards, he became Mahadevan's disciple. He also learned more about laya (tempo) from Kanadukathan Rajaraman, a kanjeera and mridangam artist and a friend of Mahadevan. By age 23, Srirangam Kannan had started his career as a full-fledged morsing artist.

After graduating from university with a degree in mathematics, he joined Indian Bank, where he worked for 30 years before retiring in 2000 after having become manager.

He continued to play in concerts across India. He also performed regularly for AIR Chennai.

Kannan died on 20 September 2024, at the age of 72.

== Awards and honours ==
Srirangam Kannan was the recipient of many awards and recognitions, listed here.

- Awarded Mannargudi Natesa Pillai Award, instituted by Sri Raagam Fine Arts, Chennai, presented by Dr. M Balamuralikrishna in 1996.
- Kalaimamani Award by the Government of Tamil Nadu in 1998
- Best Upapakkavadhyam Award from the Music Academy, instituted by Dr. Ramamurthy, in 1998 & 2001.
- Honoured as the Asthana Vidwan of Sri Kanchi Kamakoti Peetam in the year 2000.
- Best Upapakkavadhyam Award from Narada Gana Sabha, instituted by Obul Reddy, in 2003.
- Lifetime Achievement Award in the field of Carnatic Music from the Kanchi Kamakoti Peetam in 2003.
- A Top Graded artiste in All India Radio
- Meritorious Award for achievement in Carnatic Music, instituted by the Maharajapuram Santhanam Foundation, Chennai in 2005.
- Vani Kala Sudhakara award for the most proficient morsing vidwan, instituted by Sri Thyaga Bhrama Gana Sabha, Chennai in 2005.
- Lifetime Achievement Award in the field of Carnatic Music from Sri Sachidananda Swamy of Datta Peetam, Mysore in 2006
- Nada Vidya Bhupathi, instituted by Nada Dweepam Trust, Chennai in 2009.

== Tours and concerts ==
Listed here are Srirangam Kannan's tours and concerts.

- 1988: Festival of India in USSR with Shri. Karaikudi R Mani and Dr. N Ramani
- 1990: Tala Vaadya Concerts in France, Italy, Belgium and the UK.
- 1990: Participated in the Collegium Instrumentale Halle, Chamber Orchestra in Germany, presented by Dr. L Subramaniam
- 1991: Tala Vaadya ensemble conducted by Zakir Hussain in Malaysia.
- 1992: Tala Vaadya ensemble organized by Indian Council for Cultural Relations in Hungary, Germany, and the UK.
- 1997: Indian Independence Golden Jubilee Celebration at New Delhi, Tala Vaadya ensemble with Umayalpuram Sivaraman and Pt Kishan Maharaj.
- 1998: Participated in the International Music Festival, held at Helsinki, Finland
- 1998: Participated in the Telstra Adelaide Music Festival, Australia.
- 2000: Participated in the Jazz Festival, Copenhagen, Denmark.
- 2000: Participated in the World Expo, Hannover, Germany.
- 2000: Participated in the Czech Republic Day Festival, Prague, Czech Republic.
- 2001: Participated in the Fusion Music Concert by Australian Art Orchestra with Shri. Karaikudi R Mani held at the Opera House, Sydney, Australia.
- 2001: Tala Vaadya ensemble presented and conducted by Percussive Arts Society at SAMI, Sweden.
- 2001: Participated in the Queensland Biennial Festival of Music in Australia with 'Sruthi Laya' of Shri Karaikudi R Mani.
- 2002: Tala Vaadya ensemble conducted by 'Sangeetham' at Sadlers Wells UK.
- 2003: Participated in the Music Festival organized by 'Sangeetha Swaram', Malaysia.
- 2006: Participated in the Indian Council for Cultural Relations sponsored concert in Fiji Islands and Australia

== Sources ==
- "Interview". The Hindu. 16 May 2008. Archived from the original on 20 May 2008.
- Interview in Chennaionline
