= Kandiah Anandanadesan =

Sri Lankan-British mridangam teacher

Kandiah Anandanadesan (1961 –16 April 2020) was a Sri Lankan-British mridangam teacher.

Kandiah was born in 1961 in the Northern Province of Sri Lanka at Thellipalai, Jaffna. He attended Union College and Mahajana college. He learnt to play mridangam under Guru K P Sinnarajah. His father served as a teacher at Union College, while his mother was a school teacher having worked at the Mahajana College. He played with a Carnatic music background. He moved to London in the 1980s. In addition to mridangam, he also taught other prominent traditional Carnatic percussion instruments including ghatam, kanjira, morsing and thavil for his students. He died on 16 April 2020 at the age of 58 in London due to COVID-19 pandemic.
