= Likembe =

Lamellophone instrument

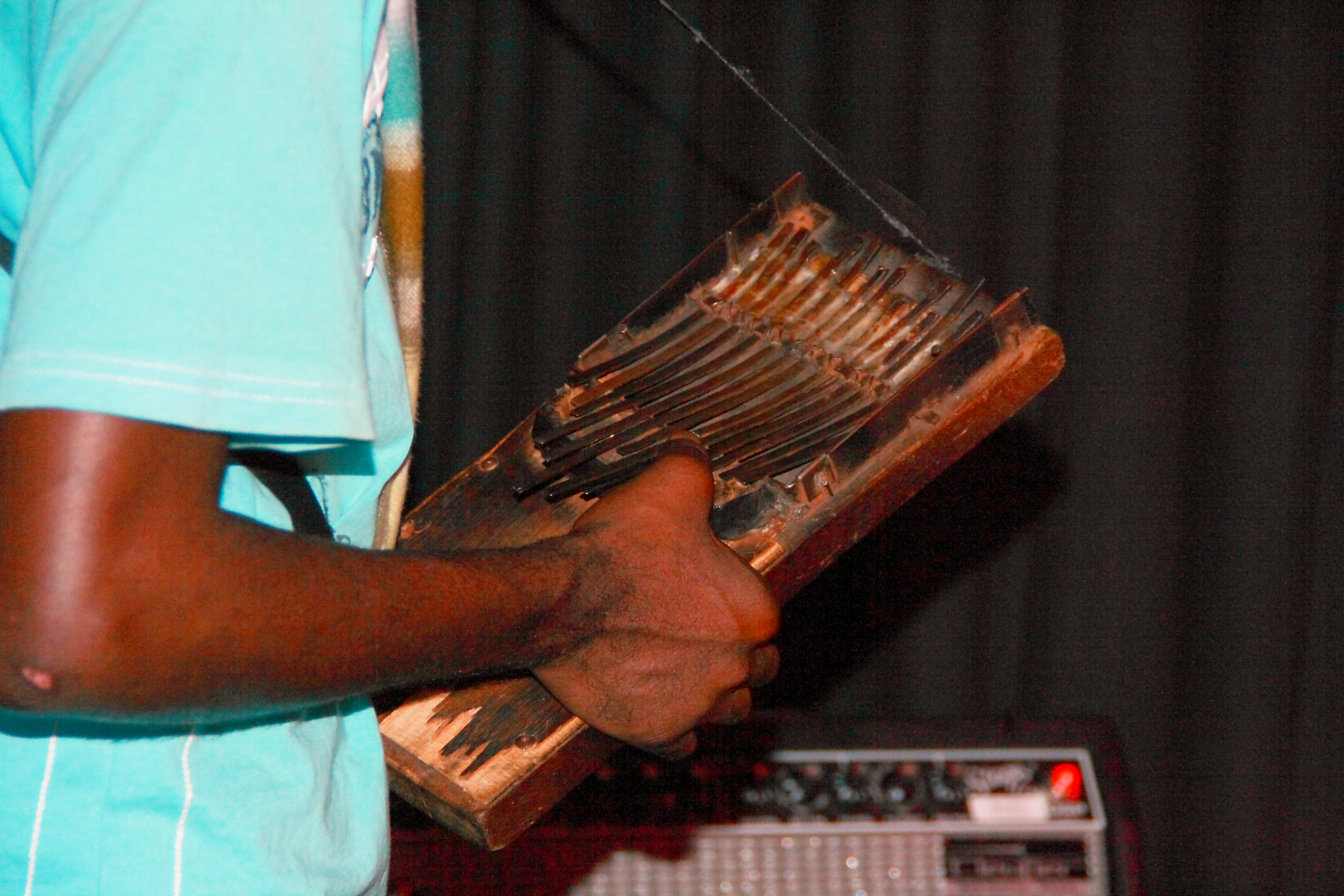
A member of the Kinshasa-based band Konono Nº1 playing the likembe

The likembe (also known as dikembe, ikembe, lukeme, esanji, chisanji, or kisanji) is a traditional African lamellophone (thumb piano) originating among the ethnic groups of western, southern, and northern parts of the Democratic Republic of the Congo. Its sound is produced by plucking flexible metal tongues attached to a wooden resonator. According to ethnomusicologist Gerhard Kubik, the term likembe may be used generically to describe a distinctive group of lamellaphones characterized by a box-shaped resonator, a U-shaped iron bridge, eight to twelve lamellae arranged in a V- or VI-pattern, a cut-out section on the reverse for securing the pressure bar, one or more rear soundholes for producing a "wow" effect, and metal rattle rings mounted around some of the lamellae.

The likembe has traditionally been regarded as a personal instrument. As described by the Grinnell College Musical Instruments Collection at Grinnell College, "in general, a likembe is made by the person who plays it for their own pleasure; it is not a professional or ensemble instrument, but well suited to being played during long walks or idle moments". The instrument was typically made by its own player rather than by specialist craftsmen.

== Etymology and terminology ==
The term likembe or sanza are one of many regional terms used for Congolese lamellaphones. Among Congolese ethnic groups, the instruments is known by a variety of vernacular names, including tshisanji (or chisanji) tsha nzadi (Tshiluba), sambi or ndara (Kikongo), kisanji (Teke), and esanzo (Nkundo).

Gerhard Kubik uses the Lingala designation likembe as a typological rather than strictly ethnolinguistic term, applying it to instruments possessing six defining characteristics:

- a box-shaped wooden resonator;
- a U-shaped iron bridge;
- between eight and twelve lamellae arranged in a V- or VI-formation;
- a cut-out section on the reverse facilitating the attachment of the pressure bar;
- one or more soundholes on the back used to create a "wow" effect; and
- metal rattle rings attached around some of the lamellae between the bridge and pressure bar.

Although regional instruments may differ substantially in ornamentation and appearance, they may still belong to the same organological type if they share these structural characteristics.

== Classification and construction ==
The likembe is classified as a lamellaphone, whose sound is produced by plucked flexible tongues fixed to a resonating body. The vibrating tongues, known as lamellae, are plucked with the thumbs while the resonating chamber amplifies their sound.

The instrument is typically carved from a single block of hardwood. Craftsmen hollow out one side of the wood to create an internal resonating chamber before sealing the opening with a strip of wood and wax. One or two soundholes are then burned into the back of the instrument. Additional wood is removed from the reverse side above the resonating chamber, leaving a thin board with partial sidewalls. A series of holes is burned across this section for attaching the keyboard mechanism. The lamellae are fashioned from narrow strips of flattened scrap iron. Each strip passes over two supporting elements on the front of the instrument:

- a U-shaped iron bridge; and
- a rectangular wooden backrest.

A metal pressure bar is placed perpendicular to the lamellae. Copper wire is threaded through the holes, wrapped over the pressure bar, and tightened to secure the lamellae against both the bridge and the backrest. Only the portion of each lamella extending beyond the bridge vibrates; the sounding length determines its pitch. Longer vibrating lengths produce lower pitches, while shorter lengths produce higher pitches. Most likembe have between eight and twelve keys. Examples in the Grinnell College collection include instruments with eight and ten lamellae, although one surviving instrument had lost several original tongues.

== Ornamentation and playing technique ==
Likembe exhibit a wide range of decorative styles. Some examples feature modest geometric designs carved into the soundboard, while others feature elaborate sculptural figures. Decorative motifs can help identify an instrument's cultural origin. An example from the Luba people features a carved crouching female figure that extends to about half the instrument's height. According to the Grinnell College Musical Instruments Collection, "objects with sculptural elements often served as signs of their owner's social status". The female figure has an elaborate hairstyle and scarification patterns, both symbols of elevated status within matrilineal Luba society. The collection suggests that the instrument was probably inspired by traditional Luba prestige objects but was "made for sale in the African art market".

The performer holds the instrument between both palms with the keyboard facing upward. The thumbs pluck the projecting ends of the metal lamellae, which then produce the instrument's characteristic bell-like tones. The keys are typically arranged in a V-shape. A distinctive acoustic effect is produced by manipulating the rear soundhole. The musician may rapidly cover and uncover the hole using one or both middle fingers, creating a resonant pulsing sound commonly described as a "wow" effect. This modulation enriches the instrument's sound without altering the tuning of the lamellae.

== History ==
Although archaeologists and ethnomusicologists propose that African lamellaphones with plant-fiber tongues may date back as far as two thousand years, the modern metal-keyed likembe appears to be much more recent. Kubik argues that the likembe design characterized by a wooden box resonator, iron bridge, and metal lamellae originated during the nineteenth century in the southern Congo region. Its spread beyond the Congo coincided with economic and social changes under colonial rule. Kubik attributes its rapid spread to labor migration, explaining that colonial mining, plantation agriculture, and industrial employment brought together members of different ethnic groups, which facilitated the exchange of musical traditions and instrument-making techniques.

According to the Royal Museum for Central Africa, the instrument was introduced to Burundi, where it is known as ikembe, at the "beginning of the twentieth century", having been imported from the Belgian Congo. The museum also notes that the Rwandan form belongs to the "fluvial" type because it "originates from the region of the great rivers in the Congo", and that its spread was ensured by the Kongo and Bangala peoples, who used it to accompany solo songs. In Burundi, the ikembe is produced by the Twa people and is played primarily by the Twa and Hutu.
