= Malimbe =

Type of xylophone

The malimbe is a type of xylophone from the Congo which is described as having both male and female counterparts; the former has 15 wooden bars, the latter has nine. "Malimbe" also refers to a lamellaphone or mbira type instrument amongst the Nyamwezi of Tanzania.
