= Đàn môi =

Traditional Vietnamese mouth harp

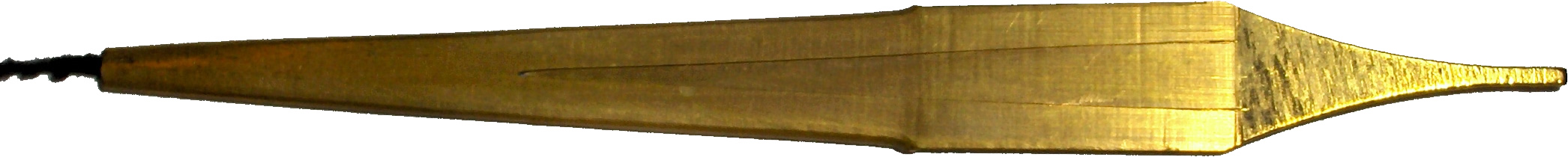
- Bass Đàn môi

Đàn môi (lit. 'lip lute') is the Vietnamese name of a traditional musical instrument widely used by the minority ethnic groups of Vietnam (including the Jrai "Rang Leh"). It was derived from the mouth harp of the Hmong people.

An inward-oriented lamellophone, the đàn môi is a noncomposite brass mouth harp. Unlike the jaw harp, which is held against the teeth while being played, the đàn môi is held against the lips while the lamella is plucked. This gives much more flexibility to the player, leaving them freer to shape their oral cavity as a resonance chamber to amplify the instrument. It is often enclosed in a wooden or bamboo box when stored.

== See also ==
- Jaw harp
- Kouxian
