= Kisanji =

Lamellophone instrument

Kisanji being played.

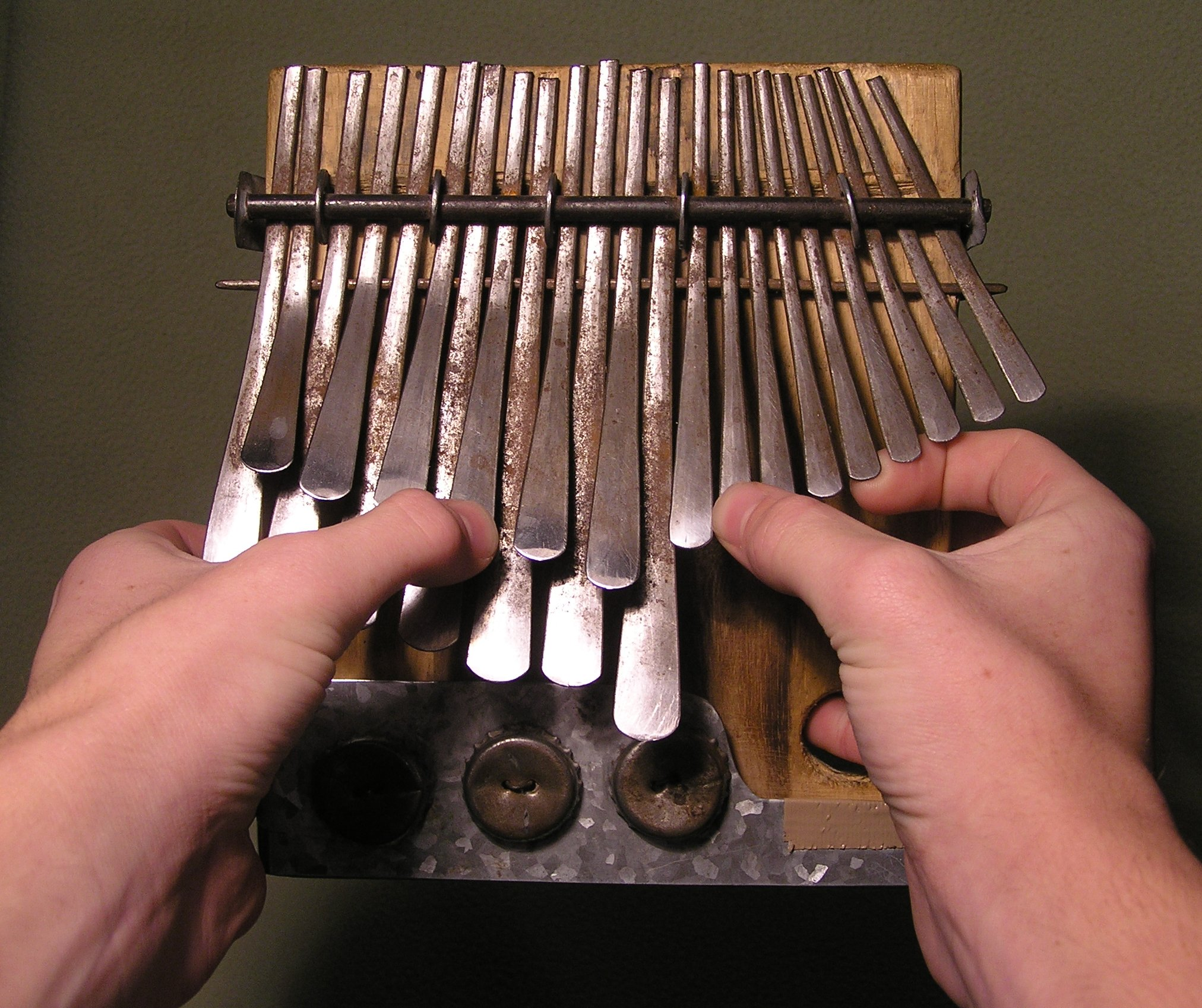
how to hold an Mbira Dzavadzimu

Kisanji is the name given to the lamellaphone of the Ngala-speaking people of western DR Congo and eastern Congo Republic. It is also known as Ikembe, Chisanji, Eleke or sanza, and is played by holding the instrument in both hands and plucking the keys with the thumbs. The pitch of each metal key is determined by the width of the key. Most often the placement of the keys is symmetrical, with the lowest keys in the middle and the higher keys on each end of the instrument. The most common tuning is the pentatonic scale without semitones, for example do re mi sol la, which varies by region. The music played on the sanza is polyrhythmic with overlapping rhythms. The instrument is often used to accompany the voice, to great effect. The keys are attached to a sounding board by metal strips or wires and placed over a gourd or clay resonator of varying sizes. The number of keys varies by region, as well. Within each region the instrument can take on a variety of shapes. The sanza in the accompanying photo has a resonator made from a turtle shell that has been attached to the sounding board with natural fibers.

== See also ==
- Mbira
