= Kubing =

Musical instrument

Sound of Kubing, 20-second sample

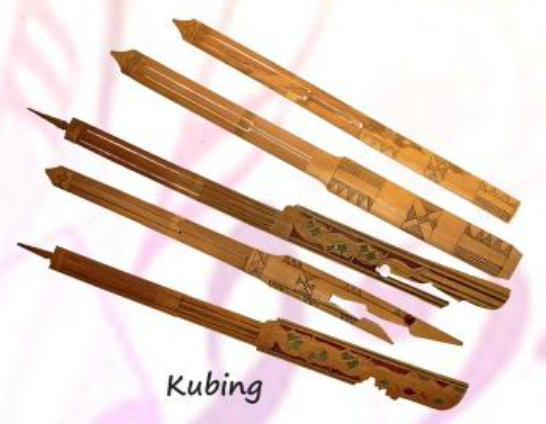
A variety of kubing harps

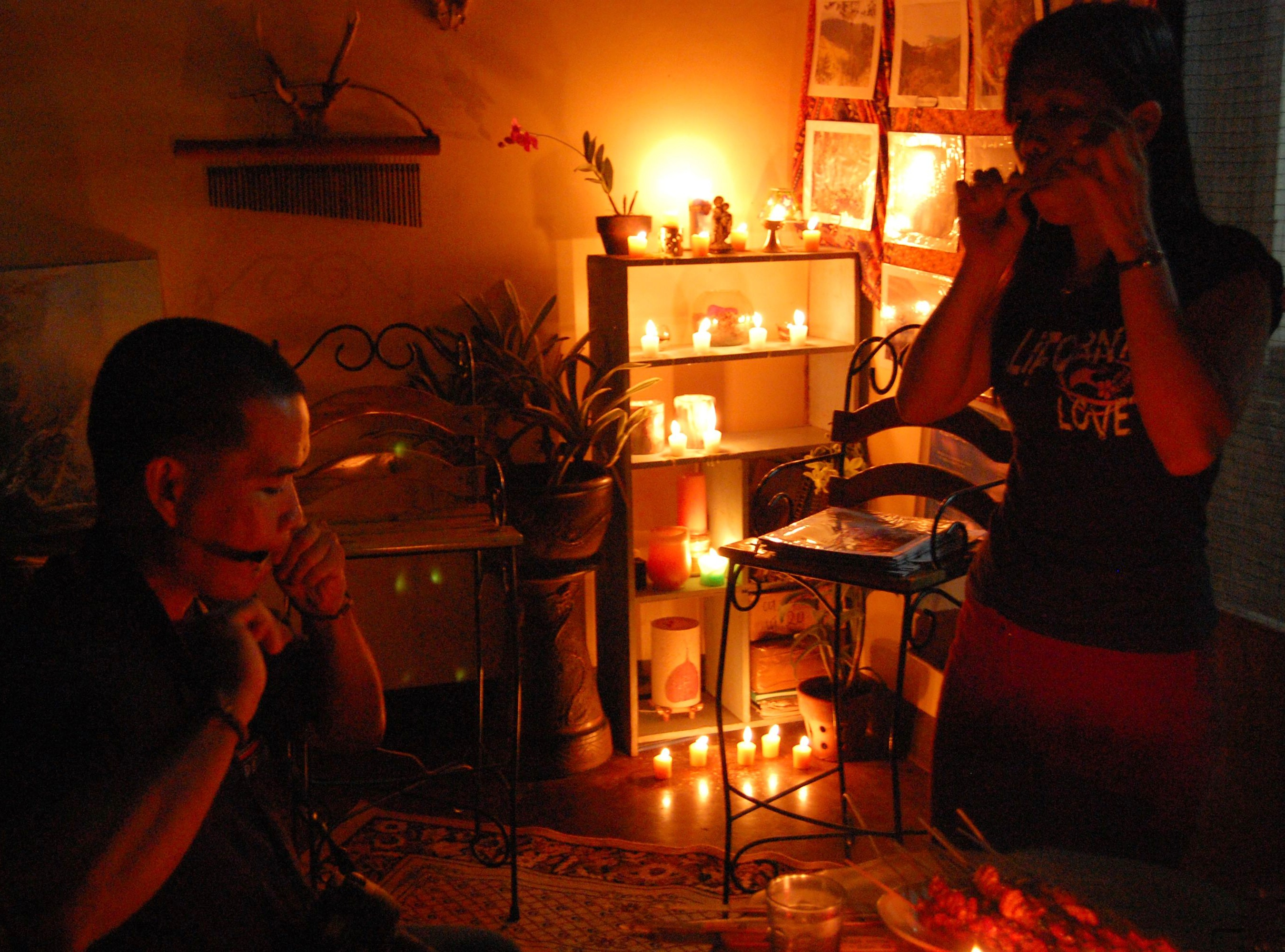
Playing the kubing

The kubing is a type of Philippine jaw harp from bamboo found among the Maguindanaon and other Muslim and non-Muslim tribes in the Philippines and Indonesia. It is also called kobing (Maranao), kolibau (Tingguian), aru-ding (Tagbanwa), kuribaw (Ibanag and Itawes), aribao (Isneg), aroding (Palawan), kulaing (Yakan), ulibaw (Kalinga), karombi (Toraja), yori (Kailinese) or Kulibaw. Ones made of sugar palm-leaf are called karinta (Munanese), ore-ore mbondu or ore Ngkale (Butonese).

The kubing is traditionally considered an intimate instrument, usually used as communication between family or a loved one in close quarters. Both genders can use the instrument, the women more infrequently than men who use it for short distance courtship.

== See also ==
- Jaw harp
- Lamellophone
