= Ikembe =

Type of musical instrument, lamellophone

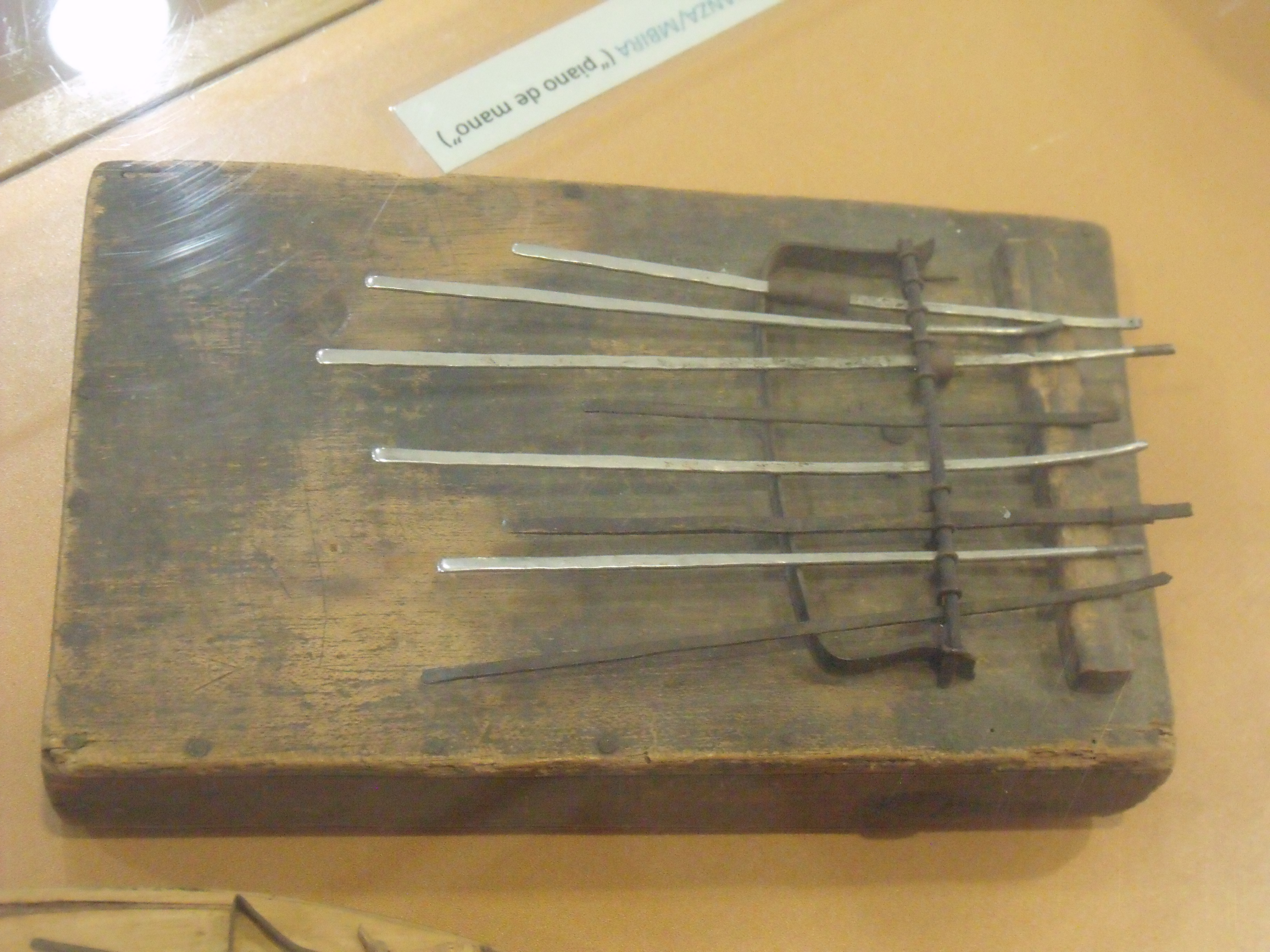

Ikembe, is a type of musical instrument of the lamellaphone group, common amongst the people of Rwanda, Burundi and the Congo. The instrument consists of several iron lamellae, fixed to a rectangular wooden soundbox.

In Swahili the word imba means song. Kuimba means to sing, as in the phrase "nitakwenda kuimba" (I go to sing). Swahili, as in many languages, uses a type of binomial nomenclature to create new words to describe unfamiliar or new objects, occurrences or people, based on existing words or concepts. By combining part of the word for mother = ma with the word for song = imba using r as a connector we come up with the word marimba = mother of song. We can then extrapolate from the research of A.M. Jones, quoted by Osborne that ka = small combined with the word imba = song should mean little mother of song.

Osborne cites examples of various names for these mbira from all over the continent, which have the Swahili word for song as their root. Admittedly, Swahili, like English, is not a virgin language, but rather a combination of a variety of languages making it useful for trading purposes. However, at the root it's still based on the Bantu languages of the peoples of Central and East Africa, which again is why it is so useful as a language of trade. A cursory examination of the root of these words gives us these common variations: imba, imbe and embe.

The following variations are used: likimbe, likembe (Amba of Uganda and the Tabura of the Congo Basin), lulimba (Yao of Malawi, Tanzania and Mozambique), lukembe (Alur and Acholi of Uganda), irimba and kajimba (Makonde of Tanzania and Mozambique), itshilimba (Bemba of Zambia), karimba (Zimbabwe), kalimba and ikembe Bahutu of Rwanda and Burundi. There are many other names for this instrument, but the predominance of names with this root is undeniable. The spelling is not as important as the sound that is made in vocalizing the names.

== Journal articles ==
- Tracey, Hugh, 'A Case for the Name Mbira' in the African Music Society Journal, no. 3 (1964)
