= Jew's harp =

Lamellophone instrument

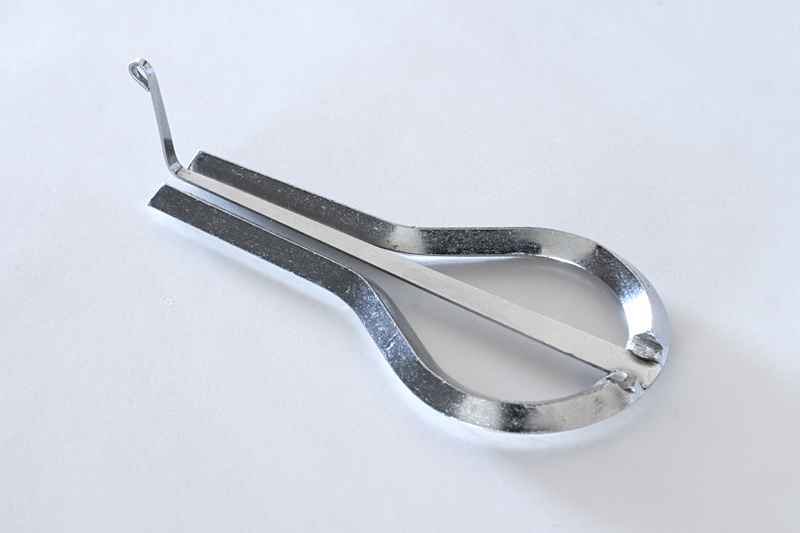
- A novelty Jew's harp sold in the U.S.
- Other names: Jew's harp, jaw harp, mouth harp, Ozark harp, juice harp, morchang, murchunga, guimbarde, mungiga, vargan, vargāns, dambrelis, parmupill, trompe, isitolotolo
- Classification: Lamellophone
- Hornbostel–Sachs classification: 121.22 (Heteroglot guimbarde (the lamella is attached to the frame))

Related instruments
- đàn môi; kubing; kouxian; morsing

Sound sample
- Munniharppu, Finnish instrument Kamus, instrument of the Altai people Juan Mari Beltran playing a Basque tronpa or musugitarra.

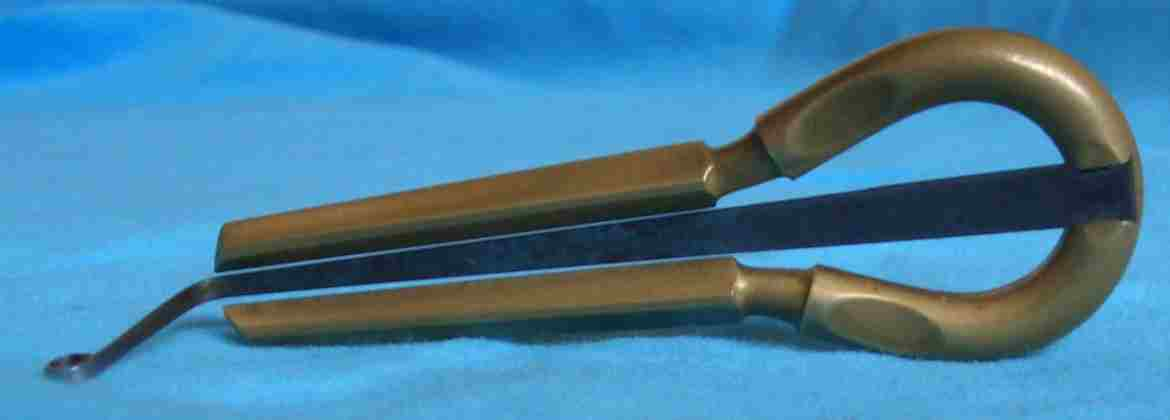
Altai khomus/kamus

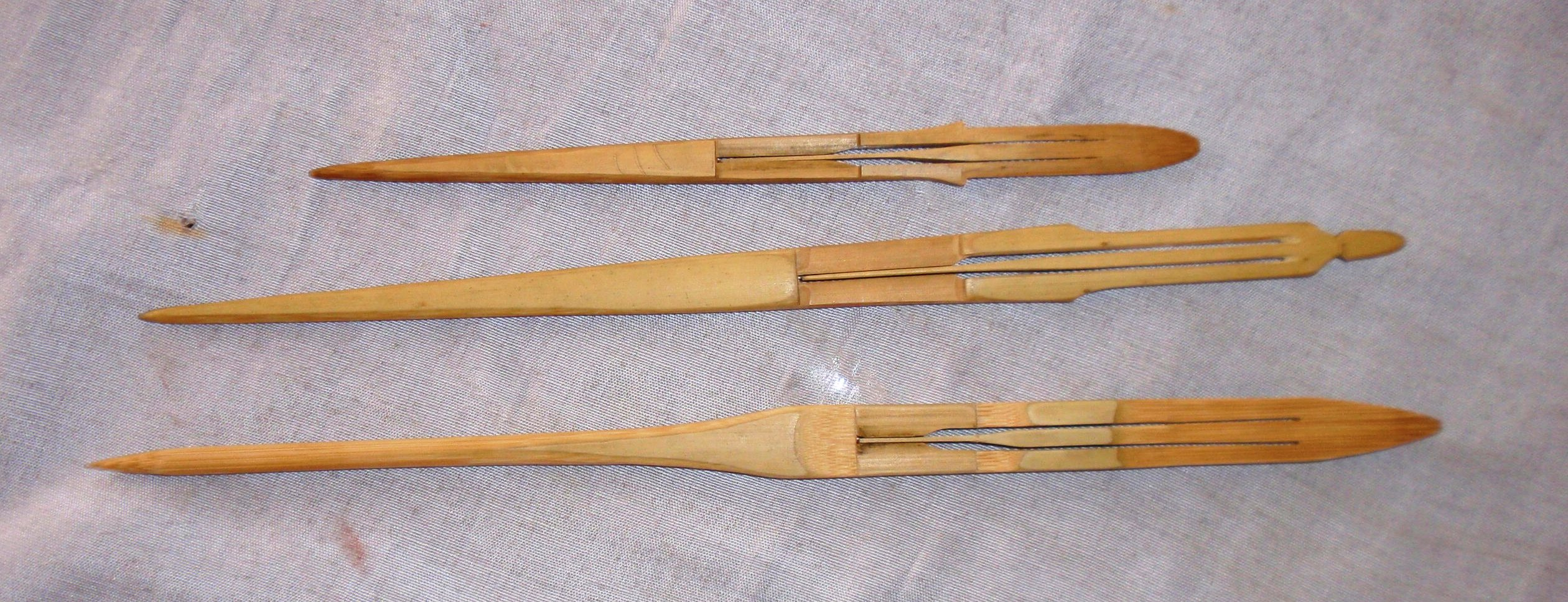
Gogona

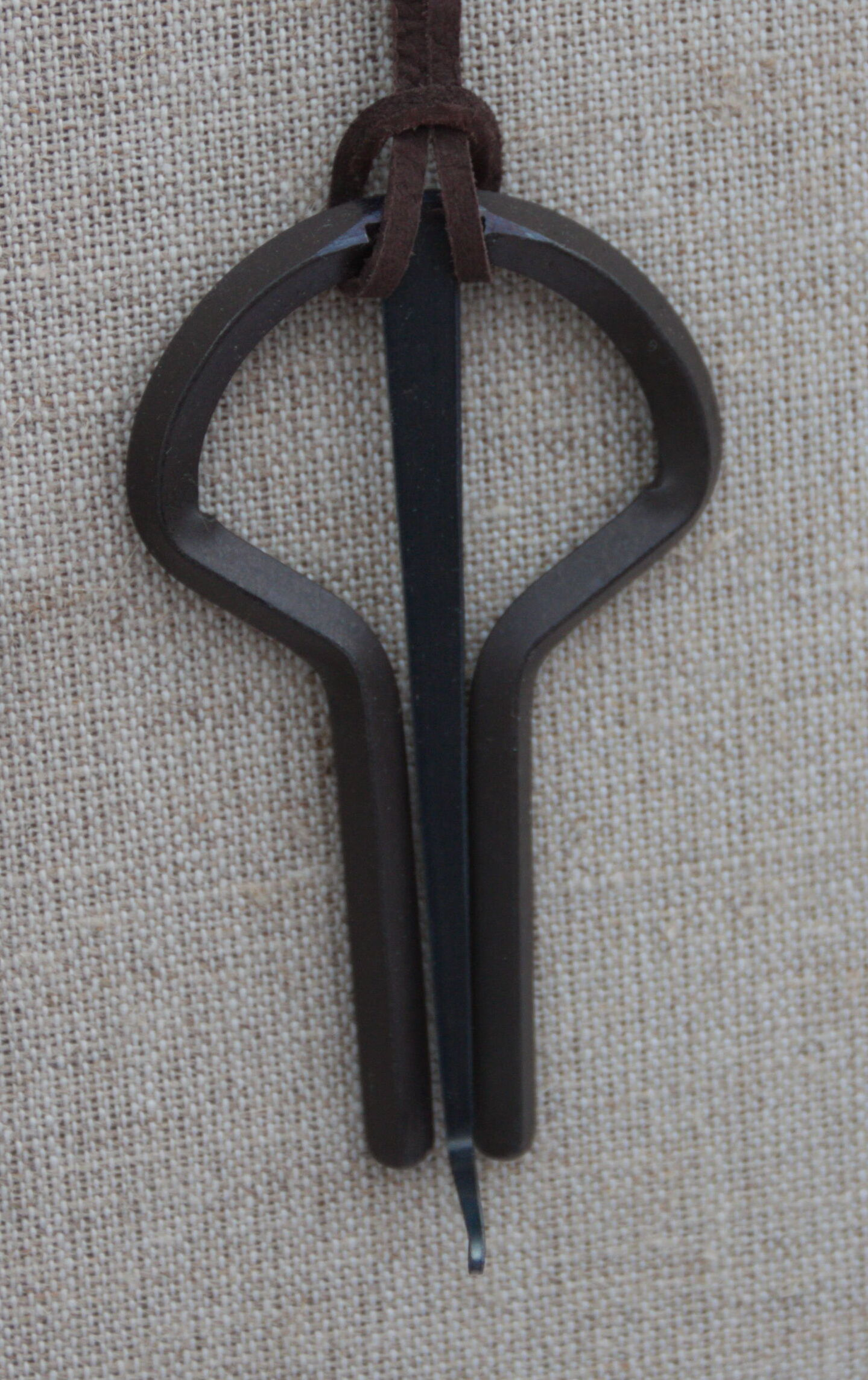
Slovak "drumbľa"

The Jew's harp, also known as jaw harp, juice harp, or mouth harp, (Note: Other names for the instrument include ağız kopuzu (Turkey), angkuoch (Cambodia), brumle (Czech), vargāns (Latvian), dambrelis (Lithuanian), changu (Sindh), đàn môi (Vietnam), doromb (Hungary), drumla (Poland), drymba (Ukraine), gewgaw, guimbard (France), guimbarda (Catalan), gogona (Assam), karinding (Sundanese, Indonesia), khomus (Siberia), kǒuxián (China), kubing (Philippines), marranzano (Sicily, Italy), Maultrommel (Austria and Germany), mondharp/munnharpe (Norway), morchang (Rajasthan in North India), morsing (South India), mukkuri (Japan), mungiga (Sweden), murchunga/binayo (Nepal), 'Ozark harp' (United States), parmupill (Estonia), 'trump' (Scotland), berimbau de boca (Portuguese), and vargan (Russia).) is a lamellophone instrument, consisting of a flexible metal or bamboo tongue or reed attached to a frame. Despite the colloquial name, the Jew's harp most likely originated in China, with the earliest known Jew's harps dating to 4,000 years ago from Shaanxi. It has no relation to the Jewish people.

Jew's harps may be categorized as idioglot or heteroglot (whether or not the frame and the tine are one piece); by the shape of the frame (rod or plaque); by the number of tines, and whether the tines are plucked, joint-tapped, or string-pulled.

== Characteristics ==
The frame is held firmly against the performer's parted teeth or lips (depending on the type), using the mouth (plus the throat and lungs when breathing freely) as a resonator, greatly increasing the volume of the instrument. The teeth must be parted sufficiently for the reed to vibrate freely, and the fleshy parts of the mouth should not come into contact with the reed to prevent damping of the vibrations and possible pain. The note or tone thus produced is constant in pitch, though by changing the shape of the mouth, and the amount of air contained in it (and in some traditions closing the glottis), the performer can cause different overtones to sound and thus create melodies.

According to the Encyclopædia Britannica Eleventh Edition, "The vibrations of the steel tongue produce a compound sound composed of a fundamental and its harmonics. By using the cavity of the mouth as a resonator, each harmonic in succession can be isolated and reinforced, giving the instrument the compass shown."

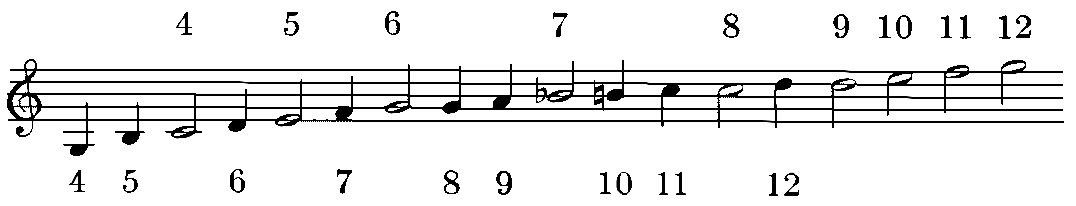
The range of a tenor Jew's harp

"The lower harmonics of the series cannot be obtained, owing to the limited capacity of the resonating cavity. The black notes on the stave show the scale which may be produced by using two harps, one tuned a fourth above the other. The player on the Jew's harp, in order to isolate the harmonics, frames their mouth as though intending to pronounce the various vowels."Schlesinger, Kathleen (1911). "Jew's Harp" . In Chisholm, Hugh (ed.). Encyclopædia Britannica. Vol. 15 (11th ed.). Cambridge University Press. p. 411. See Bugle scale.

== History ==
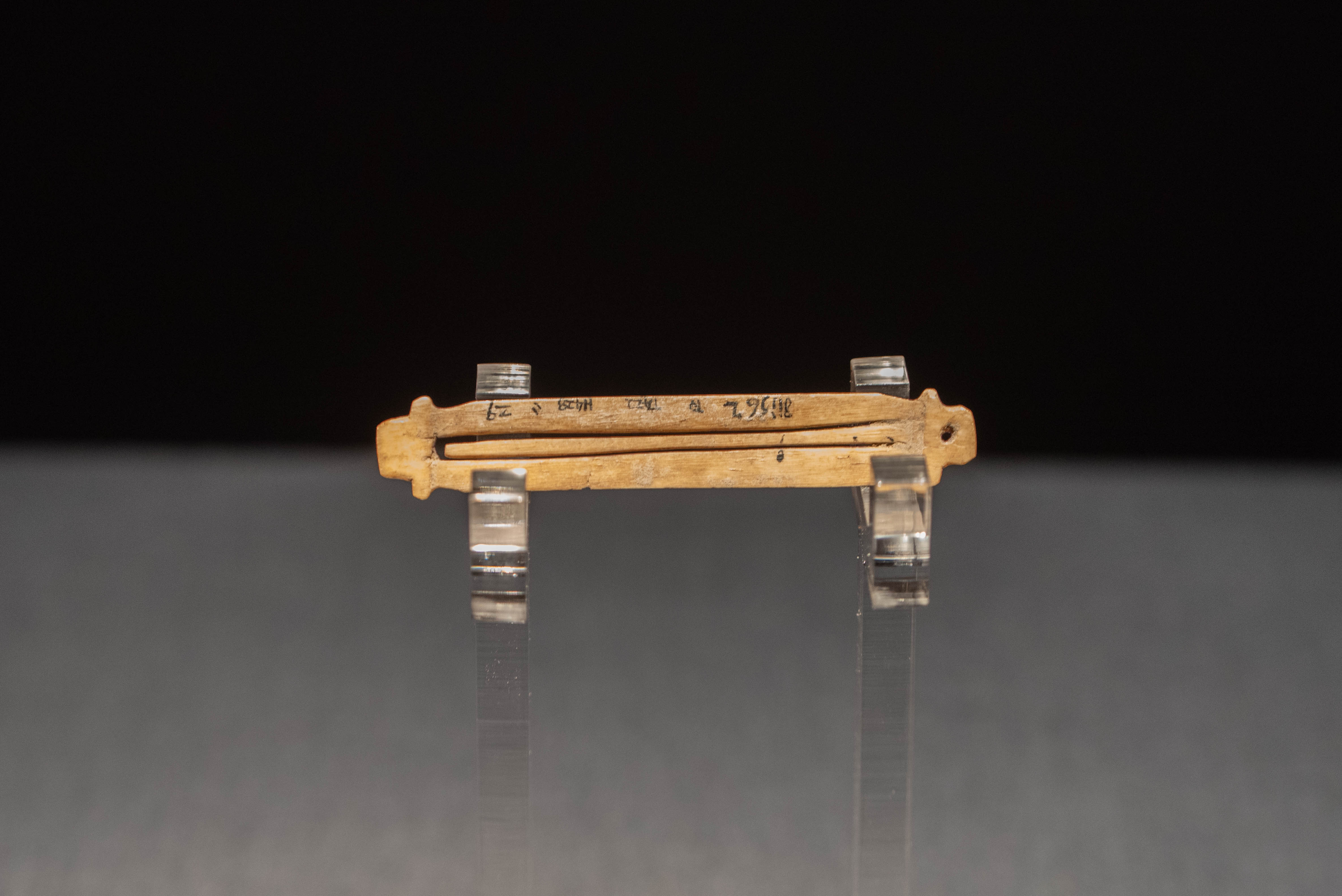
Jew's harp (kouxian) from the Taosi site in Shanxi, China, dated to around 2000 BCE

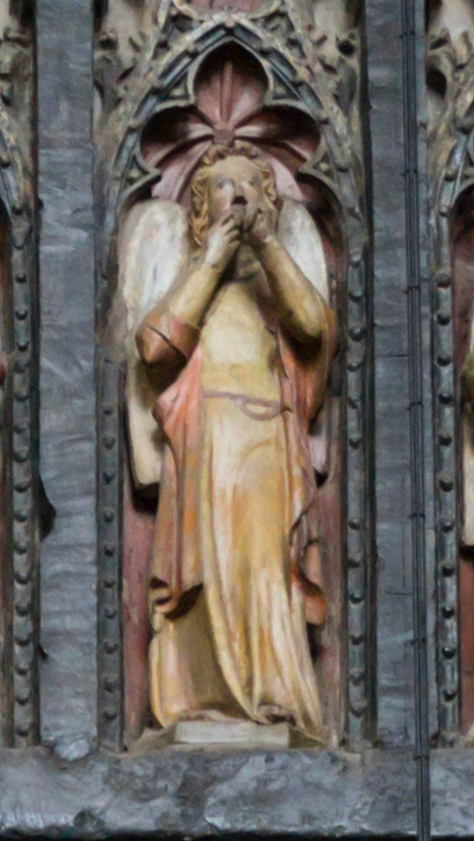
Angel playing a Jew's harp at the Minstrels' Gallery at Exeter Cathedral, 13th/14th century

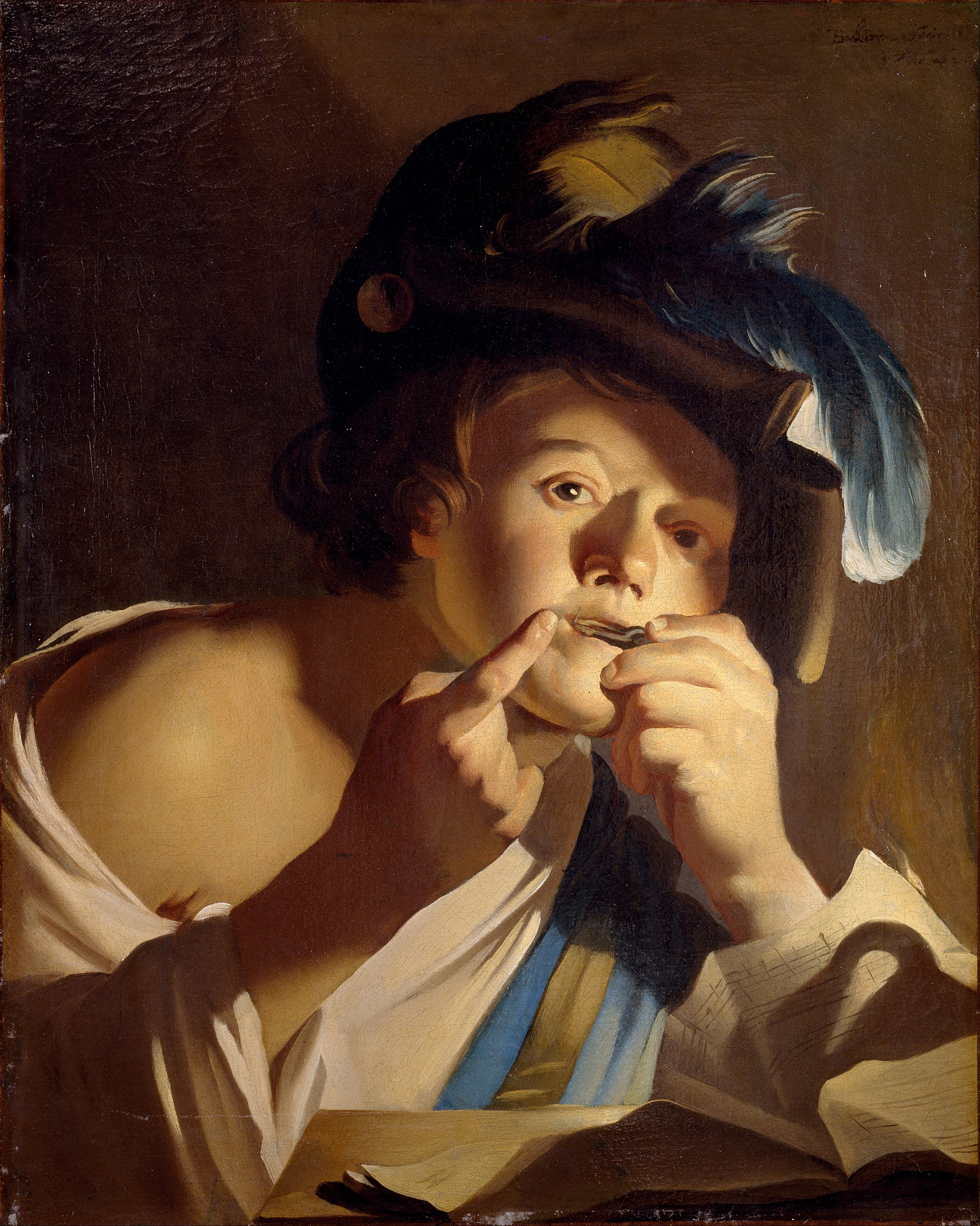
Young Man with joodse harp by Dirck van Baburen, 1621

The oldest Jew's harps were discovered in Shaanxi, China, dating back about 4,000 years ago. They were from the Neolithic site of Shimao, an important political and religious center during the Longshan culture. The earliest depiction of somebody playing what seems to be a Jew's harp is a Chinese drawing from the 3rd century BCE. Archaeological finds of surviving examples in Europe have been claimed to be almost as old, but those dates have been challenged both on the grounds of excavation techniques, and the lack of contemporary writing or pictures mentioning the instrument.

Although this instrument is used by lackeys and people of the lower class, this does not mean it is not worthy of consideration by better minds ... The trump is grasped while its extremity is placed between the teeth in order to play it and make it sound ... Now one may strike the tongue with the index finger in two ways, i.e., by lifting it or lowering it: but it is easier to strike it by raising it, which is why the extremity, C, is slightly curved, so that the finger is not injured ... Many people play this instrument. When the tongue is made to vibrate, a buzzing is heard which imitates that of bees, wasps, and flies ... [if one uses] several Jew's harps of various sizes, a curious harmony is produced.

— Marin Mersenne, Harmonie Universelle (1636)

== Etymology ==
There are many theories for the origin of the name jew's harp. The apparent reference to Jewish people is especially misleading since it "has nothing to do with the Jewish people; neither does it look like a harp in its structure and appearance". In Sicilian it is translated as marranzanu or mariolu; both of which are derogatory terms for Jewish people also found in Italian and Spanish. In German, it is known as Maultrommel, which translates directly to 'mouth drum'. The name "Jew's Harp" first appears in 1481 in a customs account book under the name "Jue harpes". The "jaw" variant is attested at least as early as 1774 and 1809, the "juice" variant appearing only in the late 19th and 20th centuries.

It has also been suggested that the name derives from the French jeu-trompe meaning 'toy trumpet'. The current French word for the instrument is guimbarde. English etymologist Hensleigh Wedgwood wrote in 1855 that the derivation from jeu harpe opposes the French idiom, where "if two substantives are joined together, the qualifying noun is invariably the last". He refers to the jeu harpe derivation, but not to the jeu tromp derivation.

Both theories—that the name is a corruption of jaws or jeu—are described by the Oxford English Dictionary as "lacking any supporting evidence." The OED says that, "more or less satisfactory reasons may be conjectured: e.g., that the instrument was actually made, sold, or imported to England by Jewish people, or purported to be so; or that it was attributed to Jewish people, suggesting the trumps and harps mentioned in the Bible, and hence considered a good commercial name." Although the OED states that "the association of the instrument with Jewish people occurs, so far as is known, only in English", the term jødeharpe is also used in Danish.

== Use ==
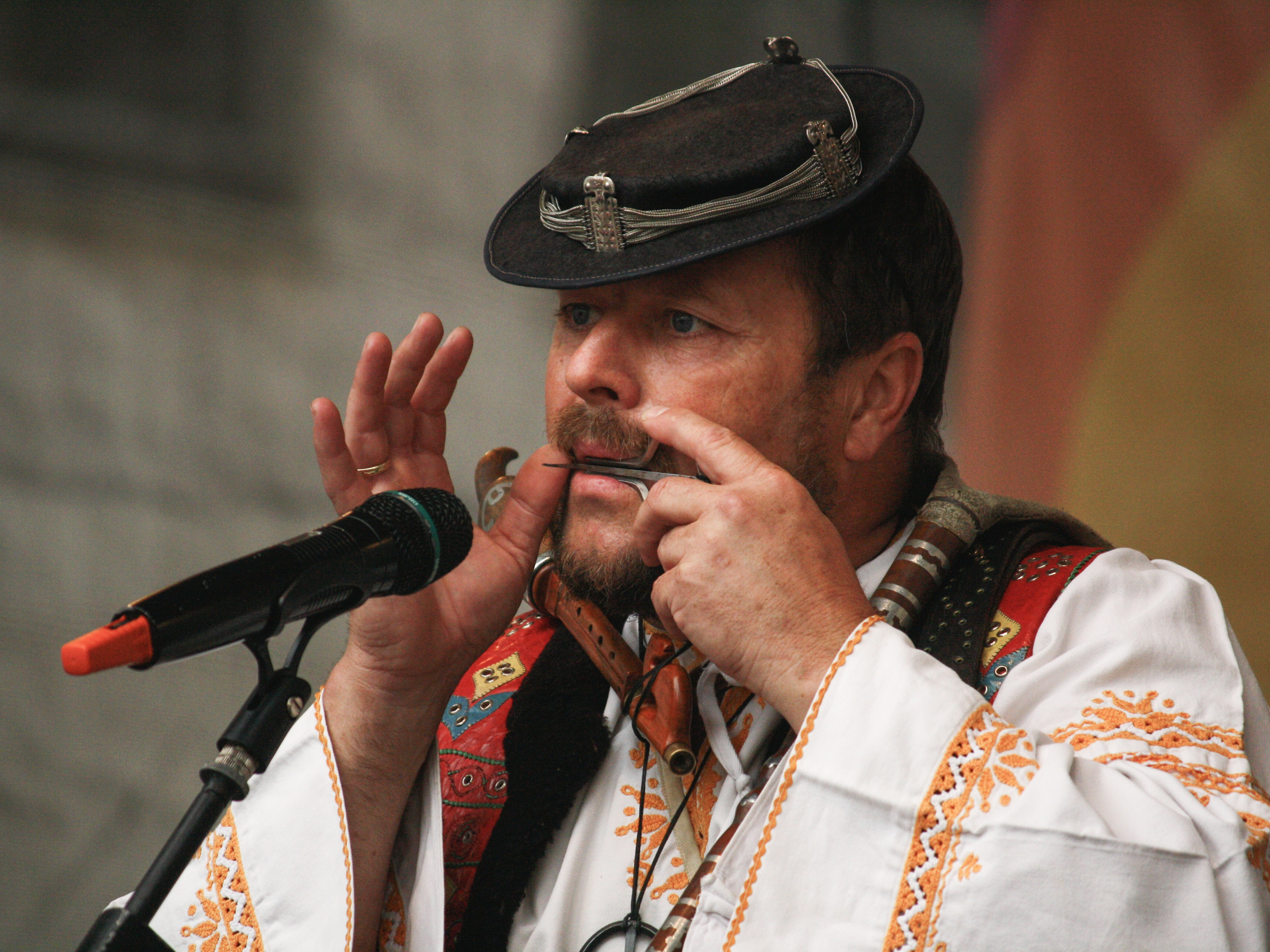
Man playing the Slovak drumbľa

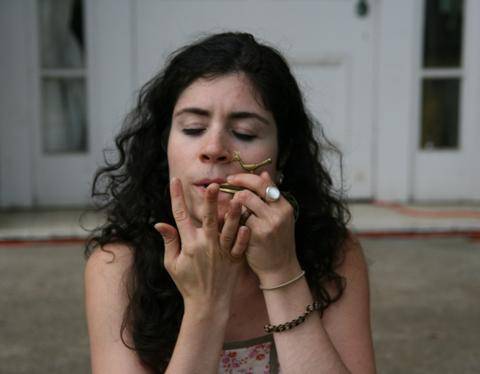
Woman playing the Rajasthani morchang

=== Cambodian music ===
The angkuoch (Khmer: អង្គួច) is a Cambodian Jew's harp. It is a folk instrument made of bamboo and carved into a long, flat shape with a hole in the center and the tongue across the hole. There is also a metal variety, more round or tree-leaf shaped. It may also have metal bells attached. The instrument is both a wind instrument and percussion instrument. As a wind instrument, it is placed against the mouth, which acts as a resonator and tool to alter the sound. Although mainly a folk instrument, better-made examples exist. While the instrument was thought to be the invention of children herding cattle, it is sometimes used in public performance, to accompany the Mahori music in public dancing.

=== Indian music ===
The instrument is used as part of the rhythm section in various styles of Indian folk and classical music. Most notably the morsing in the Carnatic music of South India, or the morchang (Rajasthani and Hindi: मोरचंग, मोरचङ्ग) in the folk music of Rajasthan in North India.

==== Manufacture of Indian morchang ====
Indian morchangs are made in many metals but mainly in brass, iron, copper and silver.

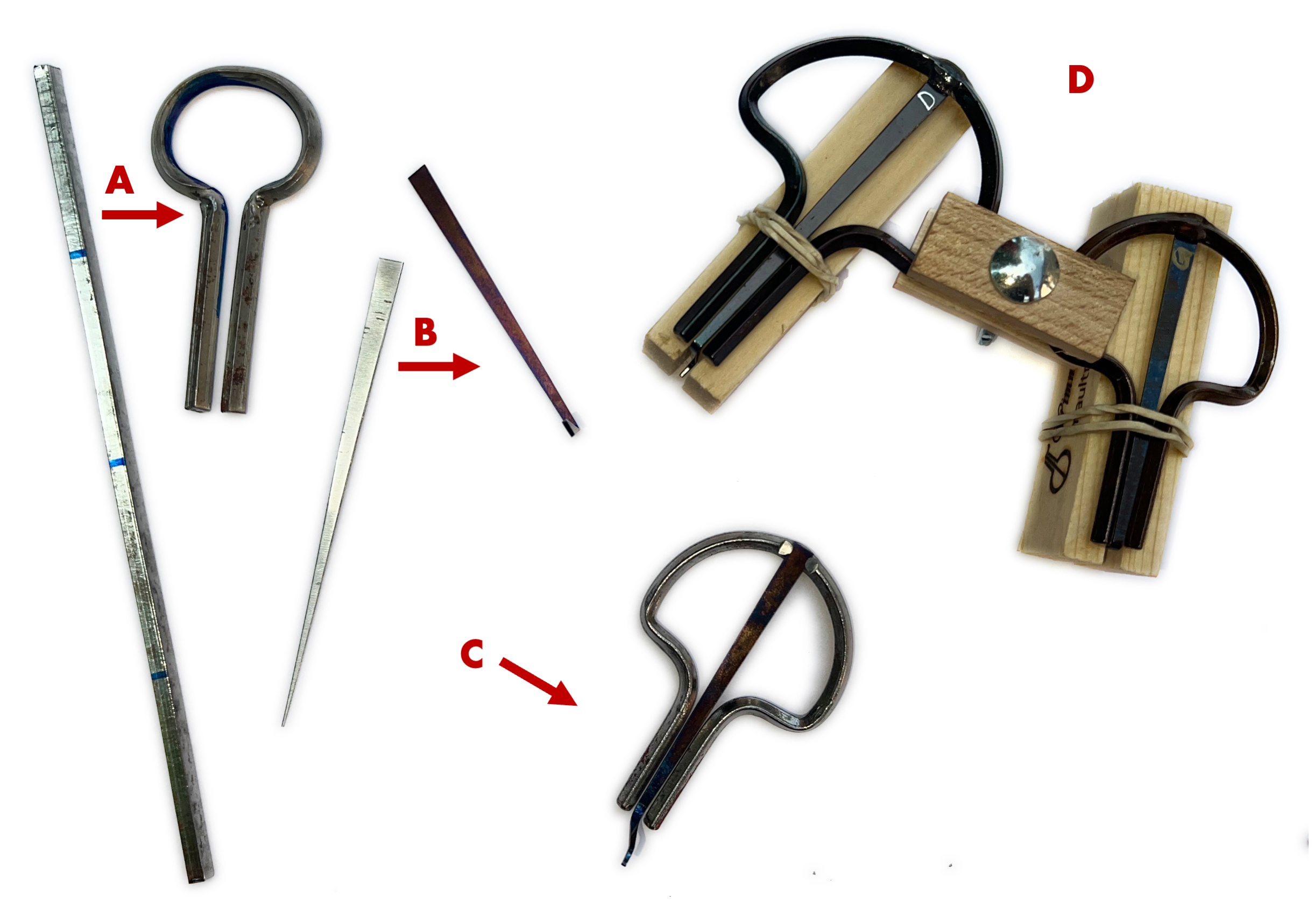
Production of Mollner Jew's harps. Work steps: (A) Bending the square metal wire, (B) cutting, hammering and hardening the vibrating tongue, (C) hammering the parts together with the dengel hammer, (D) assembling the Jew's harps according to pitch

==== Brass ====
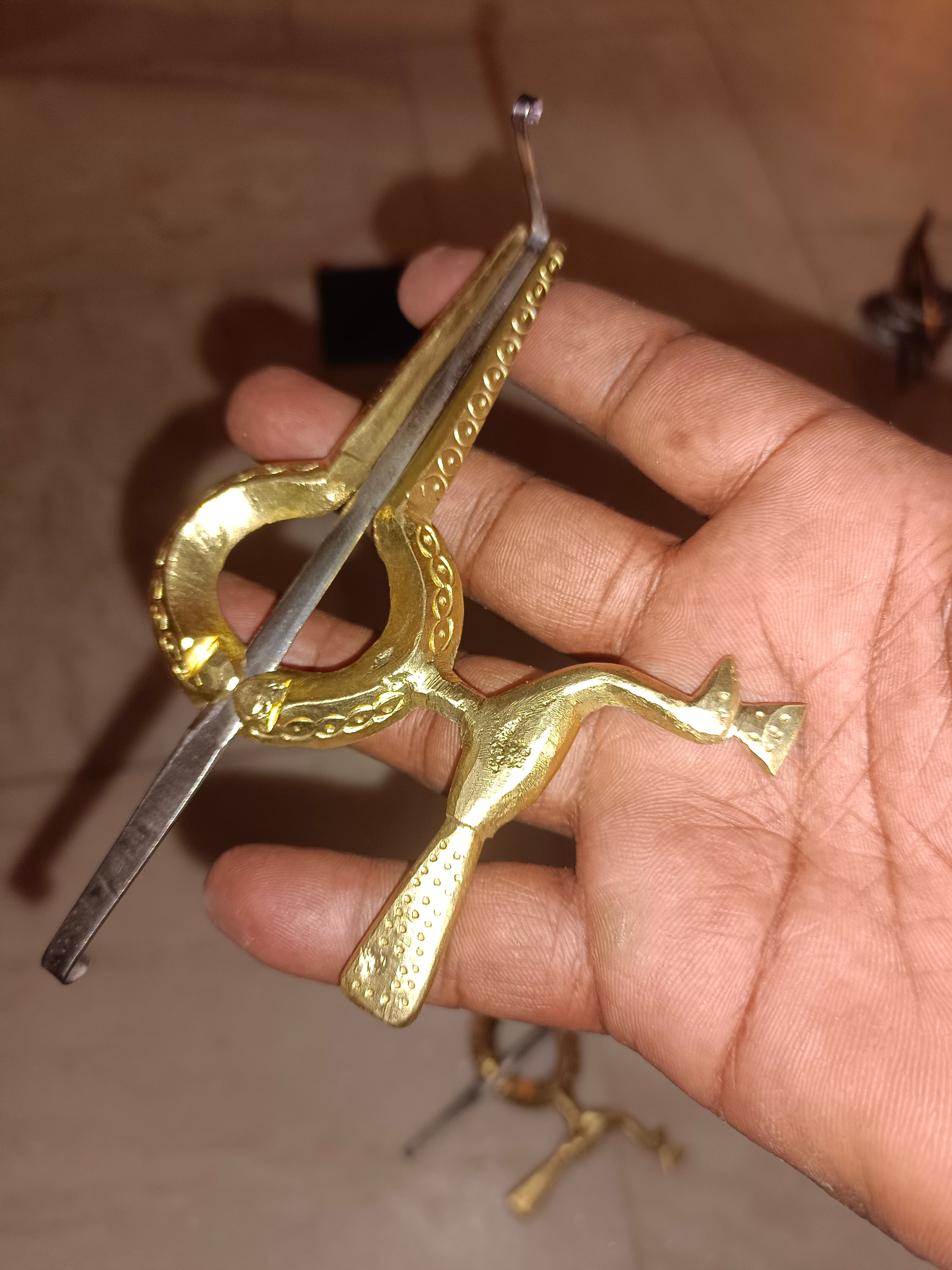
Brass murchangs

Brass murchangs are manufactured from ancient Indian manufacturing style brass metal casting. Brass molding is a process of shaping brass, into desired shapes using a mold. The brass is heated to a molten state and then poured or forced into the mold, where it cools and solidifies into the desired shape. Brass molding is often used to create intricate or complex shapes.

=== Russian music ===
In Russia, the instrument has its own brand called vargan. A Jew's harp was excavated in a 9th-century burial mound in Idelbayev, Bashkortostan.

The Jew's harp was banned in the USSR during the regime of Joseph Stalin due to its closeness to Shamanism. Nonetheless, older generations have continued to play it up until this day.

=== Nepali tradition ===
==== Murchunga ====
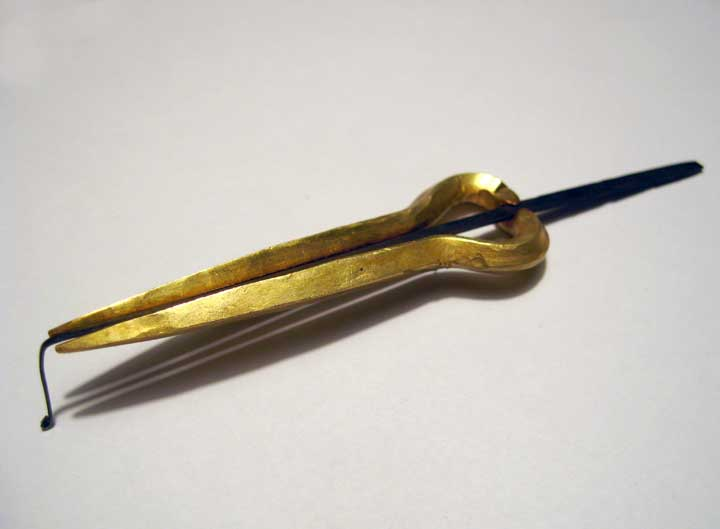
Brass murchunga, unknown maker. Length: 11 cm (4 1/4 inches)

In Nepal, one type of Jew's harp is named the murchunga (Nepali: मुर्चुङ्गा). It is very similar to an Indian morsing or morchang in that the tongue (or twanger) extends beyond the frame, thus giving the instrument more sustain.

==== Binayo ====
The binayo (Nepali: बिनायो बाजा) is a bamboo Jew's harp, in the Kiranti musical tradition from Malingo. It is popular in the Eastern Himalayan region of Nepal, Sikkim, Darjeeling, and Bhutan. It is a wind instrument played by blowing the air without tuning the node with fingers. The binayo is six inches long and one inch in width.

=== Taiwanese Indigenous music ===
Taiwanese indigenous peoples groups like the Atayal, Amis, and other populations make use of bamboo Jew's harps. Although construction methods vary greatly amongst the different indigenous groups, Taiwanese indigenous peoples typically take thin strips of bamboo, cut long grooves into the bamboo, and thread strings through the grooves.

==== Amis music ====
The Amis Jaw Harp, also known as tiw tiw, fijiq, and most commonly datok (pronounced "Sha-du"), can be traced back to the mid-20th century. The Amis Jaw Harp is unique from other Taiwan indigenous jaw harps due to the body and resonator system being connected by a string or cord rather than built as one entity. The Amis jaw harp has been recorded as being constructed as both an idioglot and a heteroglot. The instrument is traditionally double-reeded although, there are written records to point to the existence of a triple-reed jaw harp.

The traditional Amis jaw harp, or datok, is made primarily from bamboo, copper and hemp cord. Its reed can be made from either bamboo or copper, and a thin hemp cord attached to the instrument is pulled to make the reed vibrate. The body and protective case of the datok are traditionally made from arrow bamboo and are considered inseparable parts of the instrument. Some instruments also feature a protective case made from woven rattan.

Playing the instrument is slightly different from other Jew’s harps because it has a string that you pull while blowing through the frame that allows it to vibrate.

The Amis jaw's harp, has been documented in Taiwan for at least two to three centuries, according to one Taiwanese archive's reading of the Qing-era Fanshe caifeng tu kao and the Japanese-era Banzoku kanshū chōsa hōkokusho, and a Japanese colonial survey report of 1913 recorded both a jaw's harp (datok) and a musical bow (cifucul ay datok) among the Amis of Falangaw (Malan), whose similar names have been taken as evidence that the two instruments are closely related. In 1943 the Japanese ethnomusicologist Kurosawa Takatomo recorded only the musical bow, then called datok, and the jaw's harp declined during the late Japanese colonial period: in Sun Chun-Yen's interviews, Falangaw elders born before 1920 still knew the jaw's harp, those born after 1920 had used only the bow, and younger people knew neither, a decline Sun attributes possibly to social change, Japanese colonial policy, and the instruments' structure, construction and acoustic capability. In 1960–61, Ling Man-li (凌曼立) of the Institute of Ethnology, Academia Sinica, collected a bamboo jaw's harp and conducted fieldwork in the Matai'an (Mataian) community in Hualien, concluding that Amis music had the greatest variety of songs and instruments among Taiwan's Indigenous peoples. A 1995 album of jaw's harp playing by Lifok of the Amis community of Yiwan, where the instrument is called Datok, is preserved in the Crystal Index Sound Database, and scholars note that across Taiwan's Indigenous peoples the jaw's harp's traditional roles of conveying messages and speech have largely disappeared, leaving it mainly a concert and recorded instrument.

The datok was originally used by men as a serenading tool. The men would play it outside the woman's window at night and the woman would choose the tune it suited best. If the woman didn't like any of the tunes she hears, she would simply ignore the serenade. This made the instrument act as more of a telephone than an instrument between two lovers since the tunes were unique to the self-experimentation of the Amis youth.Besides courtship, the datok was also part of the everyday lives of unmarried Amis men. Traditionally, Amis society had a male age-grade system, in which young men took part in communal activities and learned to take on responsibilities within their communities.The datok was also associated with young men's social identity. Learning to make and play the instrument was an important skill, and those who made many well-crafted datoks could receive praise from elders and gain respect from other young men.Unmarried Amis men spent their nights together in communal houses until they got married.After evening group activities, they could play the datok to relax or for entertainment.Since the instrument had a soft sound, playing it would not disturb others.They could also play it while sitting, lying down, or even walking.

==== Atayal music ====
The Atayal jaw harp, or lubuw in the Atayal language, is the traditional multi-reeded, string-pulled Jew's harp of the Atayal people. In traditional Atayal society, the jaw harp also functioned as a form of intimate communication for lovers during courtship and also for playing songs during joyous occasions. Its use, however, is forbidden during funerals. Learning how to play the lubuw is traditionally considered a rite of passage for young Atayal. In modern times, like many other traditional practices, its use has gradually declined and is now more commonly seen in cultural performances rather than in everyday life.

Materials for the lubuw are gendered as well. For men, the entire mouth Jew's harp is generally made out of bamboo. While for women, the reed is often made with bronze which produces more resonance and can be more emotive. Moreover, only higher status Atayal such as chiefs and shamans are traditionally allowed to use mouth harps with multiple reeds.

The use of the lubuw faced sharp decline as a result of persecution during the Japanese colonial era. Fearing that the mouth harp could be used to pass secret signals along, the Japanese banned the use of the mouth harp, with violators facing the amputation of their fingers. This along with lubuws typically being mortuary objects meant that the cultural legacy and physical presence of the lubuw began to disappear.

However, to this day, preservation efforts of the lubuw continue to this day especially with the assistance of Atayal elders. For example, Payas Temu, one of these elders, was designated by the Taichung City government as a preserver of lubuw culture and recordings of his playing serve as key documents of the lubuw musical tradition.

=== Turkic traditional music ===
==== Sakha (Yakut) music ====
The Jew's harp is called the khomus in the Sakha Republic. The instrument is widely regarded to be a versatile tool for expressing emotion, imitating sounds of nature, and accompanying lyrical narration. The "talking vargan" method is used by some lyrical storytellers, who are able to pronounce words while playing the khomus.

==== Kyrgyz music ====
The temir komuz is made of iron, usually with a length of 100–200 mm and with a width of approximately 2–7 mm. The range of the instrument varies with the size of the instrument but generally hovers around an octave span. The Kyrgyz people are exceptionally proficient on the instrument and it is quite popular among children, although some adults continue to play the instrument. Temir komuz pieces were notated by Aleksandr Zataevich in two or three parts. An octave drone is possible, or even an ostinato alternating the fifth step of a scale with an octave.

==== Turkish music ====
In Turkish, the Jew's harp is called ağız kopuzu. The Jew's harp traditionally used in Turkish folk songs from Anatolia has fallen out of use with time. Modern renditions of Turkish folk songs with the Jew's harp have been done by artists such as Senem Diyici in the song 'Dolama Dolamayı' and Ravan Yuzkhan.

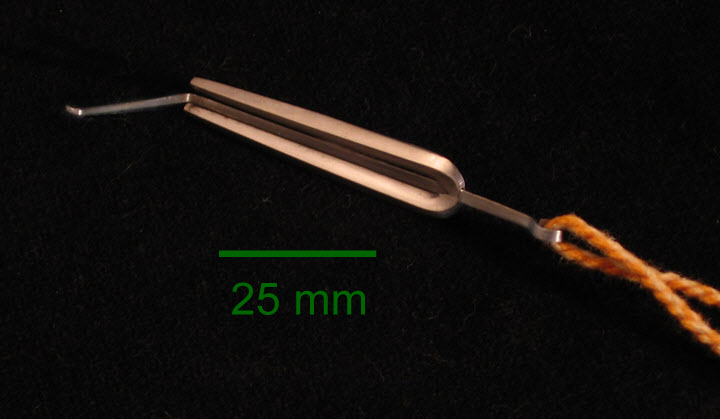
Demir-khomus from Tuva

=== Sindhi music ===
In Sindhi music, the Jew's harp is called caṅgu (Sindhi: Khudabadi: 𑋀𑋟𑊼𑋣/𑋀𑊿𑋪𑊼𑋣, Khojki 𑈎𑈴𑈊𑈯/𑈎𑈍𑈵𑈊𑈯, Devanagari: चंगु/चङ्गु, Perso-Arabic: چنگُ). In Sindhi music, it can be an accompaniment or the main instrument. One of the most famous players is Amir Bux Ruunjho.

=== South Tyrol music ===
The South Tyrol Jew's harp is very close to the Austrian Jew's harp.

=== Friulan music ===
The Friulan Jew's harp is called scacciapensieri. Friulan Jew's harp music uses typical Western harmony. It is sometimes used in folk music of Veneto but in the north of the region.

=== Sicilian music ===
In the traditional music of Sicily, the Jew's harp is commonly known in Sicilian language as marranzanu. Other names for the instrument include angalarruni, calarruni, gangalarruni, ganghilarruni, mariolu, mariolu di fera, marranzana, and ngannalarruni.

=== Austrian Jew's harp playing ===
Austrian Jew's harp music uses typical Western harmony. The UNESCO has included Austrian Jew's harp playing in its Intangible Cultural Heritage list.

In Austria, the instrument is known as Maultrommel (the literal translation is 'mouth drum').

=== Western classical music ===
Early representations of Jew's harps have appeared in Western churches since the fourteenth century.

The Austrian composer Johann Albrechtsberger—chiefly known today as a teacher of Beethoven—wrote seven concerti for Jew's harp, mandora, and orchestra between 1769 and 1771. Four of them have survived, in the keys of F major, E-flat major, E major, and D major. They are based on the special use of the Jew's harp in Austrian folk music.

In the experimental period at the end of the 18th and beginning of the 19th century there were very virtuoso instrumentalists on the mouth harp. Thus, for example, Johann Heinrich Scheibler was able to mount up to ten mouth harps on a support disc. He called the instrument "Aura". Each mouth harp was tuned to different basic tones, which made even chromatic sequences possible.

— Walter Maurer, translated from German

Well-known performer Franz Koch (1761–1831), discovered by Frederick the Great, could play two Jew's harps at once, while the also well-known performer Karl Eulenstein (1802–1890) "invented a system of playing four at once, connecting them by silken strings in such a way that he could clasp all four with the lips, and strike all the four springs at the same time".

The American composer Charles Ives wrote a part for Jew's harp in the Washington's Birthday movement of A Symphony: New England Holidays.

=== Western popular music ===
Sound demonstration and spectrum of the Mollner Jew's harp (Austria) – alternating technique on the notes C, D, G

The Jew's harp has been used occasionally in rock and country music. For example:

- Canned Heat's multi-part piece "Parthenogenesis", from their 1968 studio album, Living the Blues.
- Black Sabbath – "Sleeping Village"
- The Who – "Join Together"
- George Harrison – "I Don't Care Anymore"

Outside of rock and country music, the Jew's harp has also been used. For example:

- Kosmos - "Vindo"

== See also ==
- Music of Central Asia
- Musical bow, a one-string harp that is played with mouth resonance
- Piperheugh, a village in which trumps were once made
- Isitolotolo, Xhosa name for Jew's harp
