= Binayo =

Musical instrument

Binayo is a kind of traditional Kiranti musical instrument made from Malingo (a variety of Bamboo). It is played by plucking its metal wire reed with fore finger being gripped between the teeth. Binayo is popular in the Eastern Himalayan Region of Sikkim, Darjeeling Nepal, Bhutan. It is a wind instrument played by blowing the air without tuning the node with fingers. The Binayo is being played by from the air deposited in the lungs of the player and blown with balance, this instrument is 6 inches long and 1 inch in width.
