= Lamellophone =

Class of musical instruments

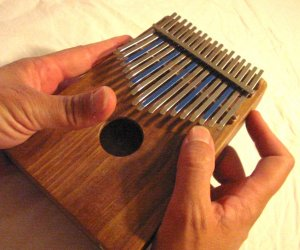
A Hugh Tracey treble kalimba

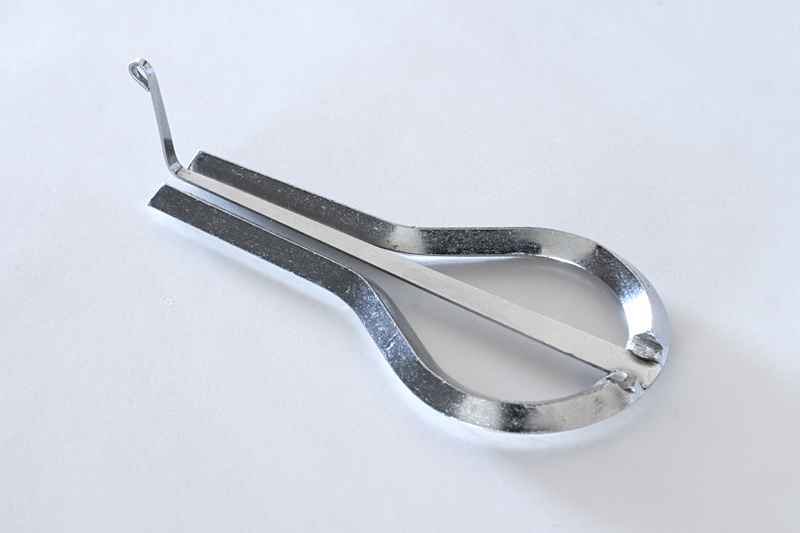
A Jaw harp

A lamellophone (also lamellaphone or linguaphone) is a member of the family of musical instruments that makes its sound by a thin vibrating plate called a lamella or tongue, which is fixed at one end and has the other end free. When the musician depresses the free end of a plate with a finger or fingernail, and then allows the finger to slip off, the released plate vibrates. An instrument may have a single tongue (such as a Jew's harp) or a series of multiple tongues (such as a mbira thumb piano).

Linguaphone comes from the Latin root lingua meaning 'tongue', (i.e., a long thin plate that is fixed only at one end). Lamellophone comes from the Latin word lamella for 'small metal plate', and the Greek word φωνή phonē for 'sound, voice'.

The lamellophones constitute category 12 in the Hornbostel–Sachs system for classifying musical instruments, plucked idiophones. There are two main categories of plucked idiophones, those that are in the form of a frame (121) and those that are in the form of a comb (122).

According to Sachs,

The most usual [of plucked idiophones] is a flexible lamella or tongue attached to a frame, plucked by a finger and resonated by a small box.

== African lamellophones ==
A large number of lamellophones originate in Africa, where they are known under different names including mbira, kisanji, likembe, kalimba, kongoma, and sanza. They play a role in southeast African Music. They were reported as early as the 16th century, but there is no doubt they have a much longer history. The Caribbean marímbula is also of this family. The marímbula can be seen as a bass variant of the mbira and is sometimes used in hip hop music.

In most cases the tongues are divided in two playing halves with the lowest notes in the centre; from there to the left and to the right each tongue is tuned higher than the previous one. The tongues may also be arranged in a linear arrangement in the manner of a piano. Tongues may be made small enough to play with individual fingers, hence the colloquial name "thumb piano". (Although some instruments, like the Mbira, have an additional rows of tongues, in which case not just the thumbs are used for plucking.)

Some conjecture that African lamellophones were derived from xylophones and marimbas. However, similar instruments have been found elsewhere; for example, the indigenous peoples of Siberia play wooden and metallic lamellophones with a single tongue.

Lamellophones may be made with or without resonators. There are also electric lamellophones with an additional pickup.

== Electric lamellophones ==
Electric lamellophones have been electrified with an electro-magnetic pickup (like on electric guitars) or contact piezo pickup.

=== Piezo pickup lamellophones ===
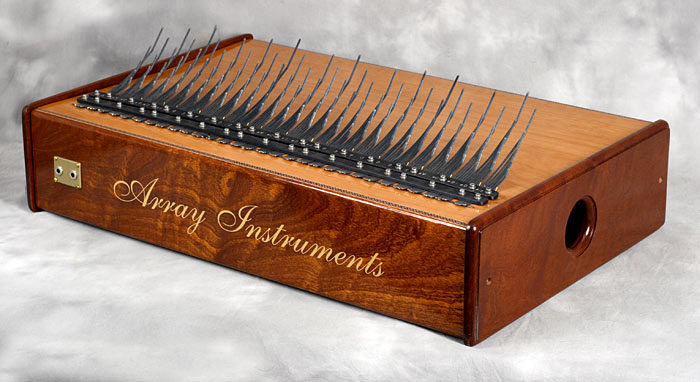
The electric Array mbira

There is a distinct difference between the piezo and the electro-magnetic pickup. Most electric lamellophones feature piezo pickups. The piezo sound contains more treble and has more problems with feedback when amplified (distorted) heavily. Lucinda Ellison produces a wide range of her Embiras, which are solid body electric mbiras with piezo pickups — a design first conceived in 1981 and finalised in 1996. David Bellinger has been making ekalimbas - kalimbas with piezo pickups - for 20 years.

The Array Mbira is a lamellophone with an alternate tine configuration. It is electrified by the addition of a 2-channel stereo piezo cable pickup system. A special solid-body Array mbira exists.

=== Electro-magnetic lamellophones ===
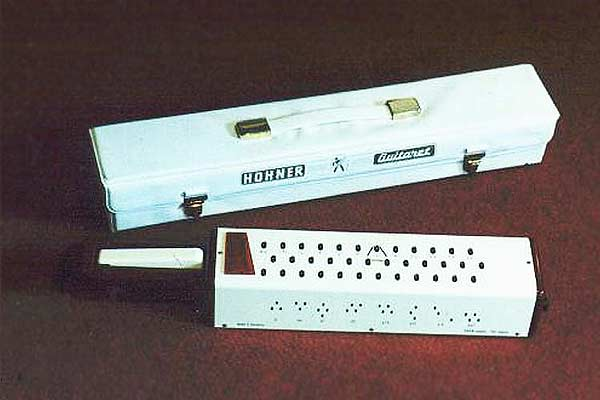
The guitaret

Ernst Zacharias created a series of electric lamellophones created in the 1960s for Hohner. These instruments were based on the reeds made by Hohner (already employed in accordions, concertinas, melodicas and harmonicas). These instruments were the Pianet (plucked by a foam pad), the Cembalet (plucked by a rubber pad) and the Guitaret (plucked by fingers). The idea of a struck reed tongue had been pioneered by the Alexandre brothers in their "Orgues expressifs" (harmoniums) in the 19th century, where they were called percussion stops.

The Space Harp, or Frankiphone (designed, built and played by Phil Cohran), is a famous instance of an electric lamellophone.

A range of other mbiras and kalimbas have been created by contemporary instrument makers. The African band Konono No.1 uses custom-built electric kalimbas with electro-magnetic pickups. Neptune's Jason Sanford makes electric thumb pianos from scrap in a similar tradition and Yuri Landman has made 12-TET bass kalimbas and metal tongue drums.

== Schaeffner's classification ==
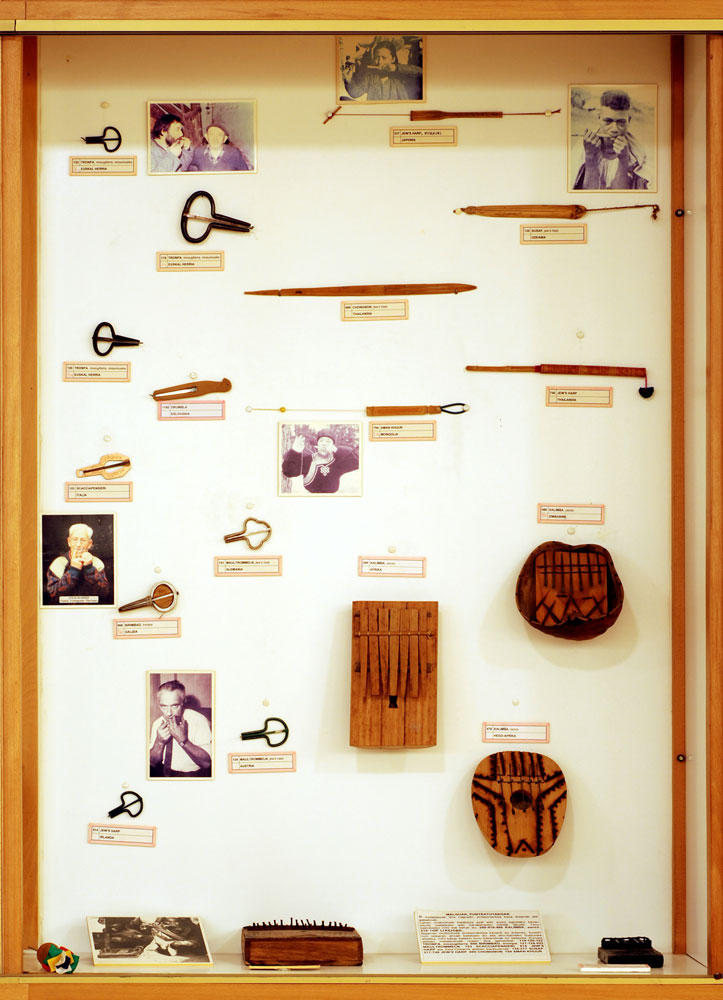
Plucked/flexible idiophones

Schaeffner's musical instrument classification scheme has a post-prominent place for the linguaphones (lamellophones) at the second highest level of classification.

In 1932, Andre Schaeffner developed a new classification scheme that was "exhaustive, potentially covering all real and conceivable instruments" [Kartomi, p. 176]. Schaeffner's system has only two top-level categories denoted by Roman numerals (Schaeffner, A.: Origine des instruments de musique, pp. 371–377.):

- I: instruments that make sound from vibrating solids;
  - IA Solids not susceptibles of tension (equivalent to a big part of Hornbostel & Sachs idiophones);
  - IB Flexible solids (equivalent to mainly linguaphones);
  - IC Tensionable solids (equivalent to both membranophones and chordophones);
- II: instruments that make sound from vibrating air (aerophones).

== List of lamellophones ==
=== In the form of a frame (121) ===
The lamellae vibrate within a frame or hoop

121.1 Clack idiophones or Cricri - The lamella is carved in the surface of a fruit shell, which serves as resonator. Also known as galip nut snapper.

121.2 Guimbardes and jaw harps - The lamella is mounted in a rod- or plaque-shaped frame and depends on the player's mouth cavity for resonance.

121.21 Idioglot guimbardes - The lamella is of one substance with the frame of the instrument.

- Đàn môi

121.22 Heteroglot guimbardes - The lamella is attached to the frame.

121.221 Individual heteroglot guimbardes.

- Jew's harp
- Morsing

121.222 Sets of heteroglot guimbardes.

- Kouxian

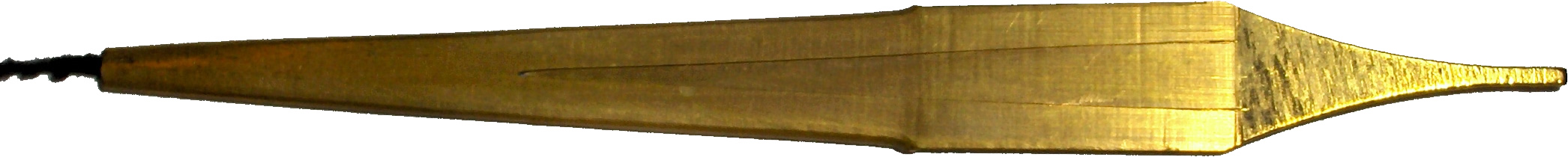
(121.21) Đàn môi, Vietnam. Instrument carved from a single piece of bamboo.

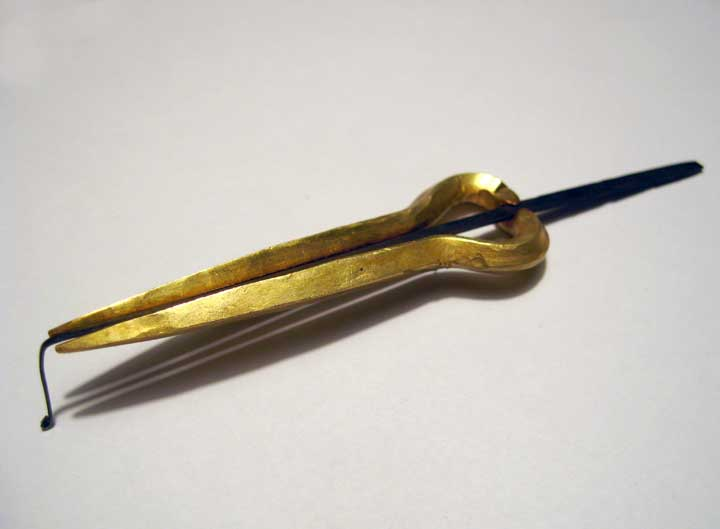
(121.221) Murchunga, Nepal

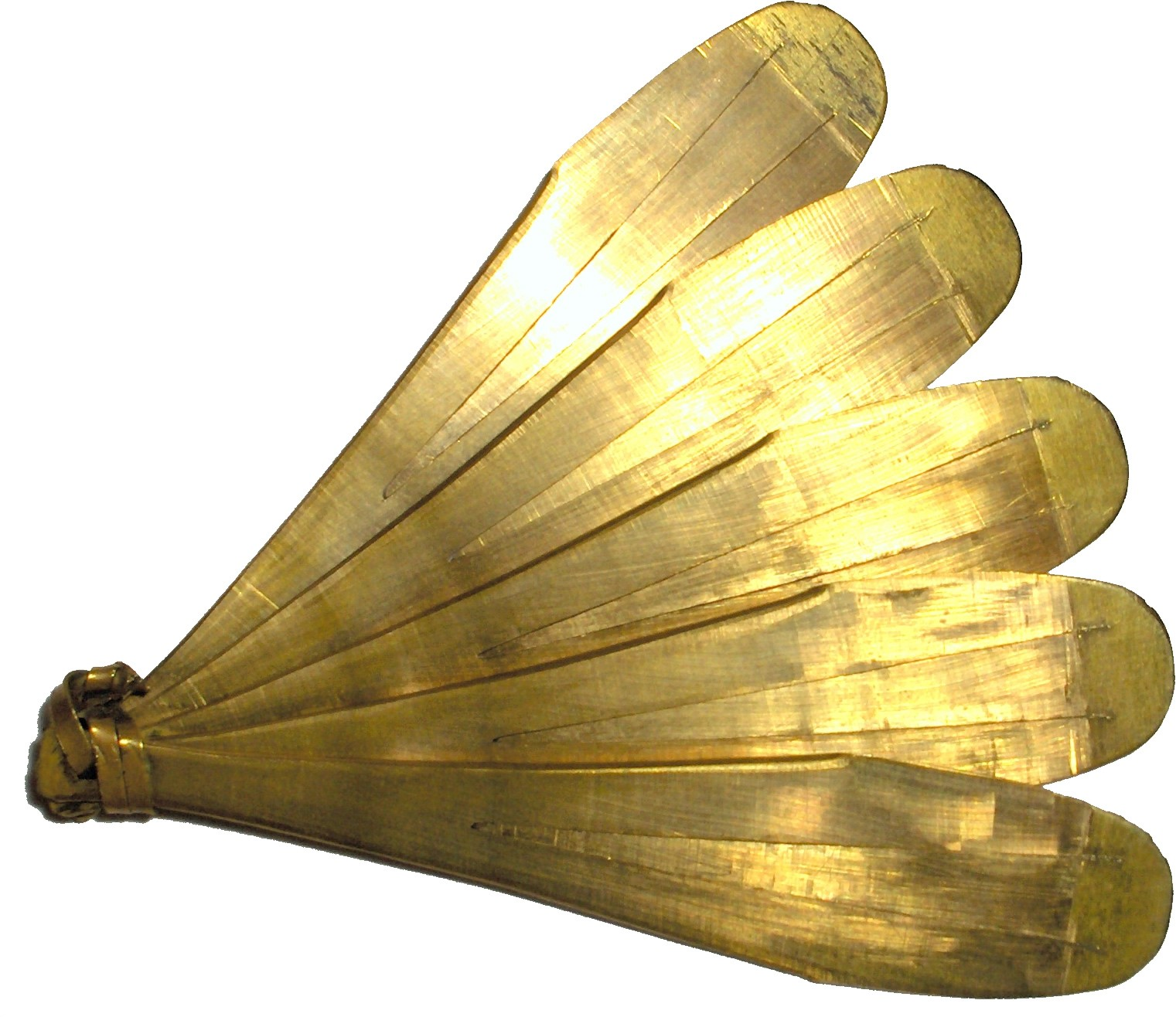
(121.222) A Kouxian, played by plucking the ends in front of the oral cavity. The lamellae resonate to produce sound.

=== In the form of a comb (122) ===
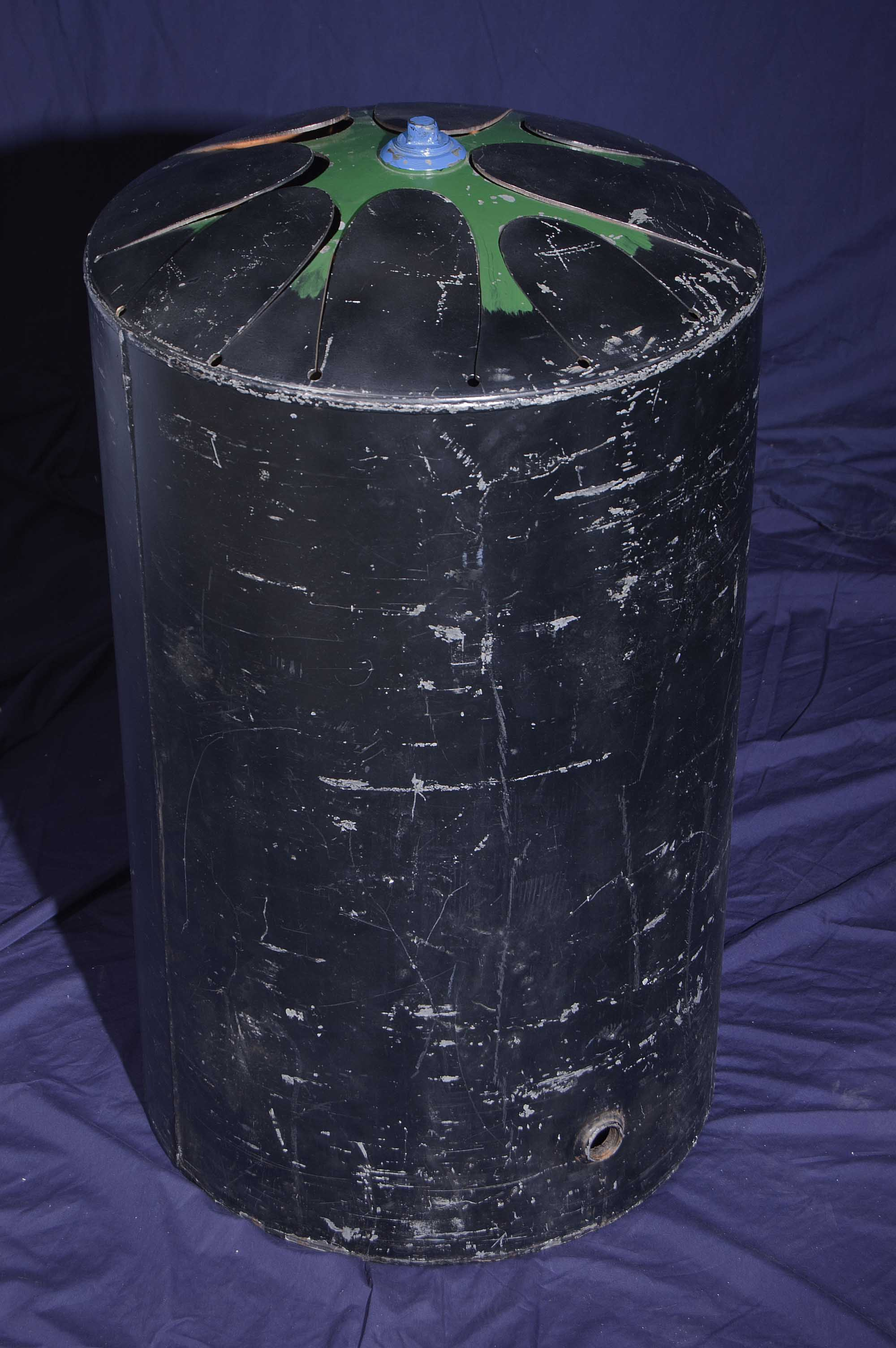
Whale Drum with 8 tongues (from Emil Richards Collection)

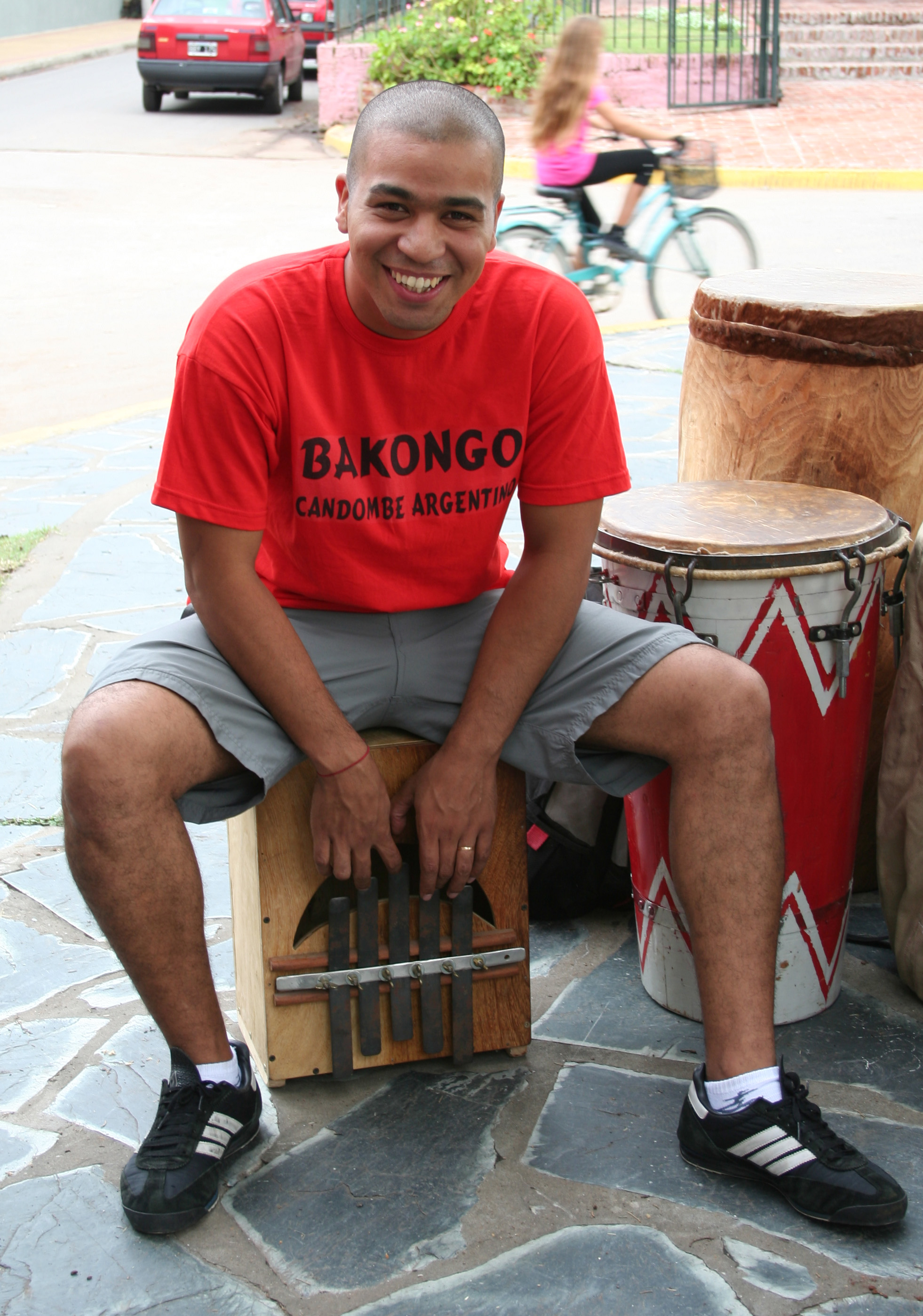
Argentinian quisanche made of wood, has five tempered steel reeds, which are dotted to mark a melodic bass in the Buenos Aires candombe.

The lamellae are tied to a board or cut out from a board like the teeth of a comb.

122.1 With laced on lamellae.

- Array mbira
- Agidigbo (Nigeria)
- Eleke
- Ikembe
- Insimbi
- Kalimba
- Kasayi
- Kisanji
- Likembe
- Lukembe (Congo and Tanganyika)
- Maduimba
- Malimbe
- Marímbula - Caribbean thumb piano
- Mbira
  - Chisanza mbira (Elisabethville)
  - Kalimba mbira (Southern Rhodesia)
  - Njara mbira (Southern Rhodesia)
  - Shona mbira (Southern Rhodesia)
- Oopoochawa
- Prempensua (Ghana)
- Thumb piano
- Tom (Ethiopia)
- Sanza/Sansa (Equatorial Africa and West Africa)
- Space Harp
- Whale Drum
- Zimbabwean Marimba

122.11 Without resonator.

122.12 With resonator.

122.2 With cut-out lamellae

- Comb
- Mechanical music box
- Slit drum
- Steel tongue drum
- Teponaztli

== See also ==
- Music of Africa
- Gravikord
