= Resonance chamber =

Cavity which amplifies sound waves

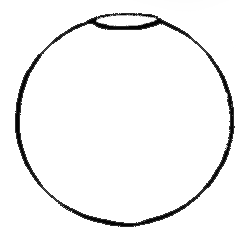
For a spherical cavity, the Helmholtz resonance frequency formula for a sphere with a sound hole, the surface of the sphere acts as a flange, so $f = \frac{v}{\pi}\sqrt{\frac{3d}{8(0.85)D^3} }$ In dry air at 20 °C, with d and D in metres, f in Hertz, this becomes $f = 72.6\sqrt{\frac{d}{D^3} }$ where: D = diameter of sphere d = diameter of sound hole

In acoustics, a resonance chamber is a cavity which enhances the transfer of energy from a sound source (e.g. a vibrating string) to the air via resonance. The chamber has interior surfaces which reflect an acoustic wave. When a wave enters the chamber, it bounces back and forth within the chamber with low loss (see standing wave). As more wave energy enters the chamber, it combines with and reinforces the standing wave, increasing its intensity.

Since the resonance chamber is an enclosed space that has an opening where the sound wave enters and exits after bouncing off of the internal walls producing resonance, commonly acoustic resonance as in many musical instruments (see Sound board (music)), the material of the chamber, particularly that of the actual internal walls, its shape and the position of the opening, as well as the finish (porosity) of the internal walls are contributing factors for the final resulting sound produced.

== See also ==
- Cavity resonator (electrical version)
- Resonance
- Sounding box
- Waveguide
- Helmholtz resonance
