= Morsing =

Instrument played with the help of mouth and hand

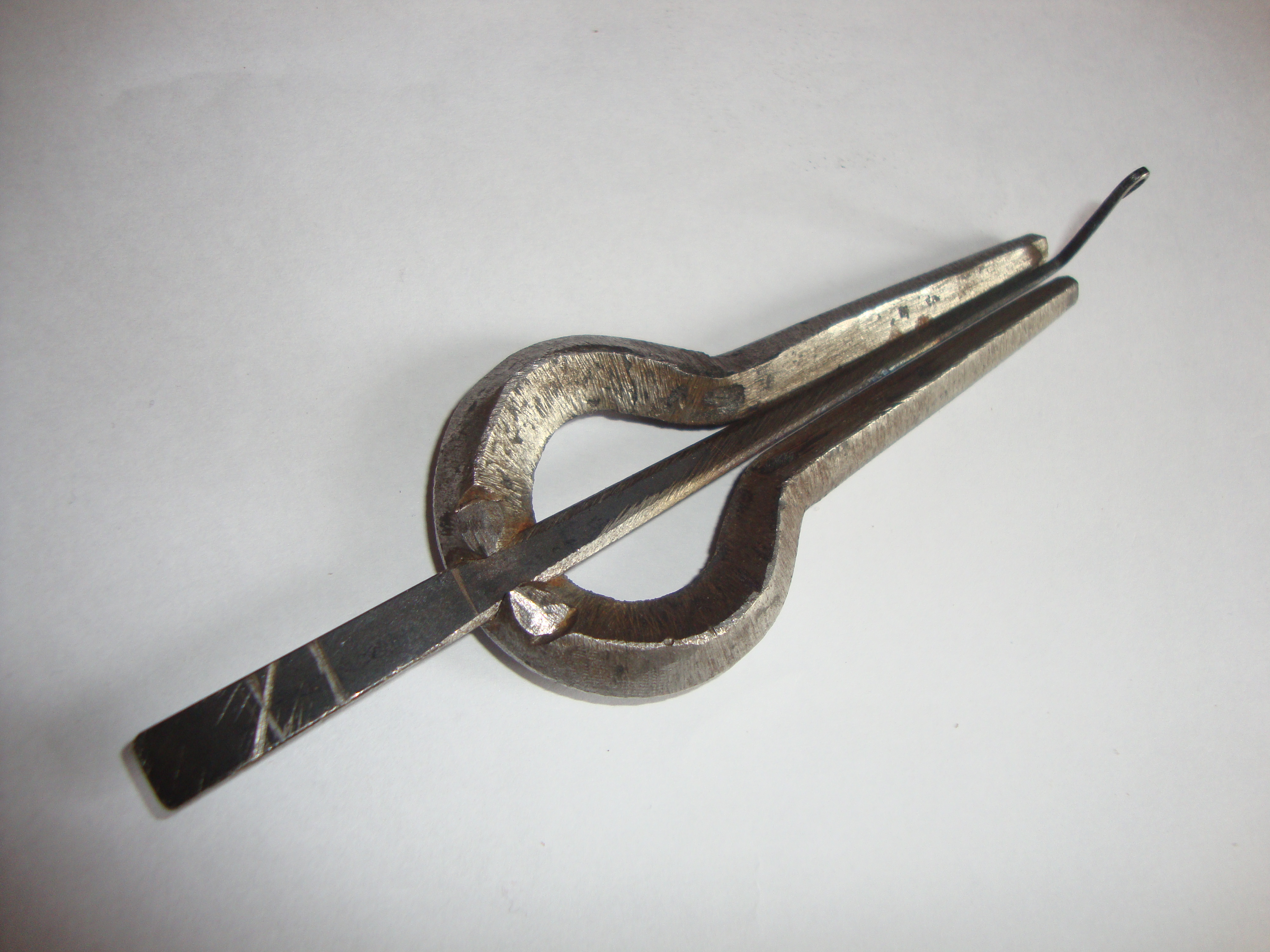
- Classification: hand percussion
- Hornbostel–Sachs classification: 121.2

Playing range
- struck using the other hand to produce sound.

The morsing (also mukharshanku, mourching, murchunga, morching or morchang, changu; lit. 'Jew's harp') (Note: Sanskrit: दन्तवाद्यन्तरात्मसत्रस्य Rajasthani and Hindi: मोरचंग, मोरचङ्ग Nepali: मुर्चुङ्गा Sindhi: Khudabadi: 𑋀𑋟𑊼𑋣/𑋀𑊿𑋪𑊼𑋣, Khojki 𑈎𑈴𑈊𑈯/𑈎𑈍𑈵𑈊𑈯, Devanagari: चंगु/चङ्गु, Perso-Arabic: چنگُ Telugu: మోర్సింగ్ Kannada: ಮೋರ್ಸಿಂಗ್ Tamil: நாமுழவு அல்லது முகச்சங்கு, commonly மோர்சிங் Malayalam: മുഖർശംഖ്) is an instrument similar to the Jew's harp, mainly used in Rajasthan of North India, in the Carnatic music of South India, in Nepal, and in Sindh, Pakistan. It can be categorized under lamellophones, which is a sub-category of plucked idiophones. The instrument consists of a metal ring in the shape of a horseshoe with two parallel forks that form the frame, and a metal tongue in the middle, between the forks, fixed to the ring at one end and free to vibrate at the other. The metal tongue, also called the trigger, is bent at the free end in a plane perpendicular to the circular ring so that it can be struck and made to vibrate.

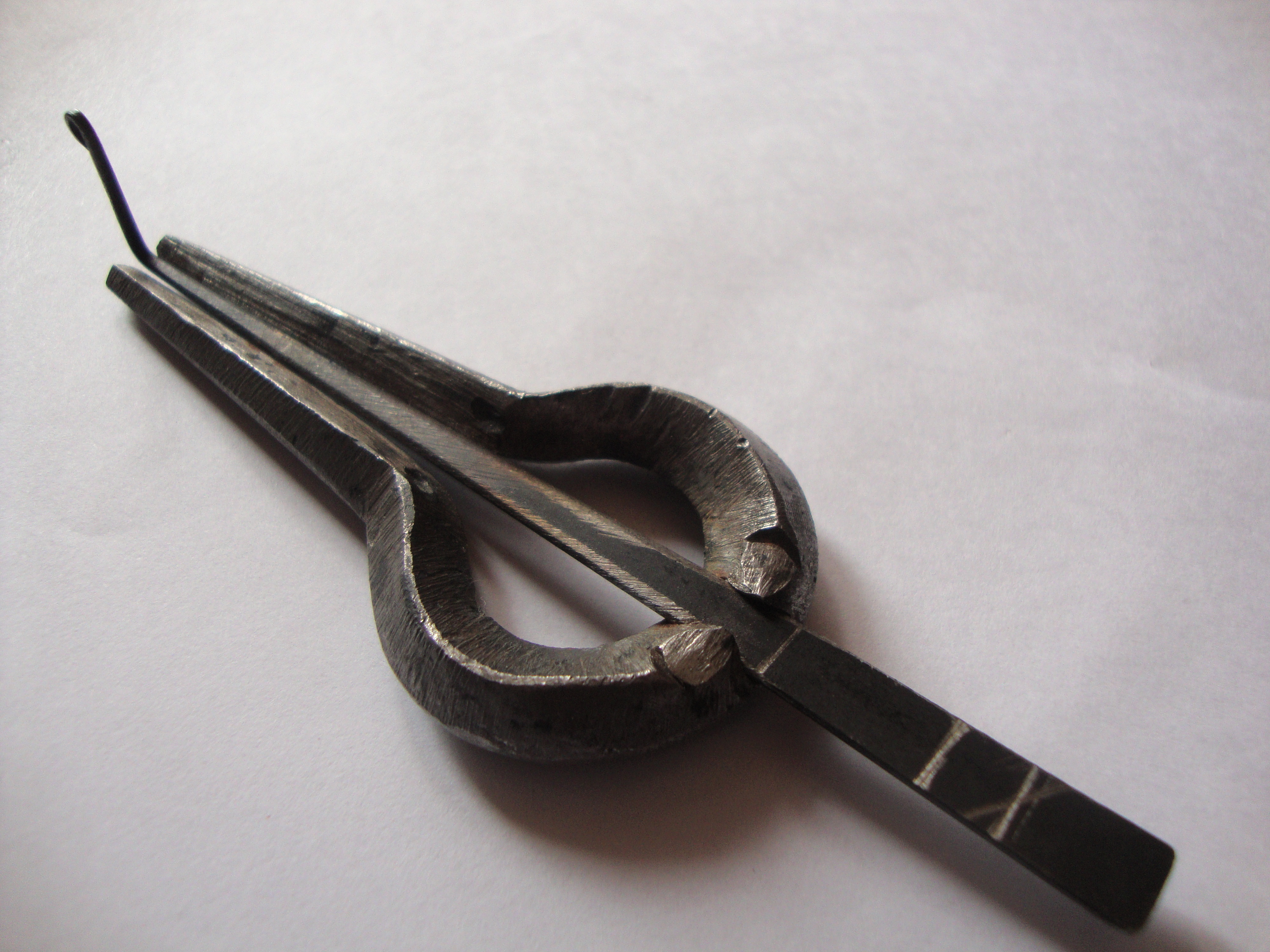
Morsing (Jaw Harp)

The morsing can be traced back over 1,500 years. Its exact origin in the Indian subcontinent is not well documented, with most ancient accounts being derived from folk tales. It is found mainly in South India, Rajasthan, and some parts of Assam. In Bengali and Assamese folk music, it is sometimes played with a Rabindra Sangeet, while in South India, it features in Carnatic concerts and percussion ensembles. In Rajasthan it is known as morchang and is used as a percussion instrument in lok geet (folk music). It was often used in Hindi cinema by music directors like R.D. Burman and S.D. Burman, and has resurfaced in the twentieth century, with street performers like Varun Zinje playing it in a renewed style. It is said to be the precursor to subsequent instruments such as the harmonica and the harmonium.

== Playing technique ==
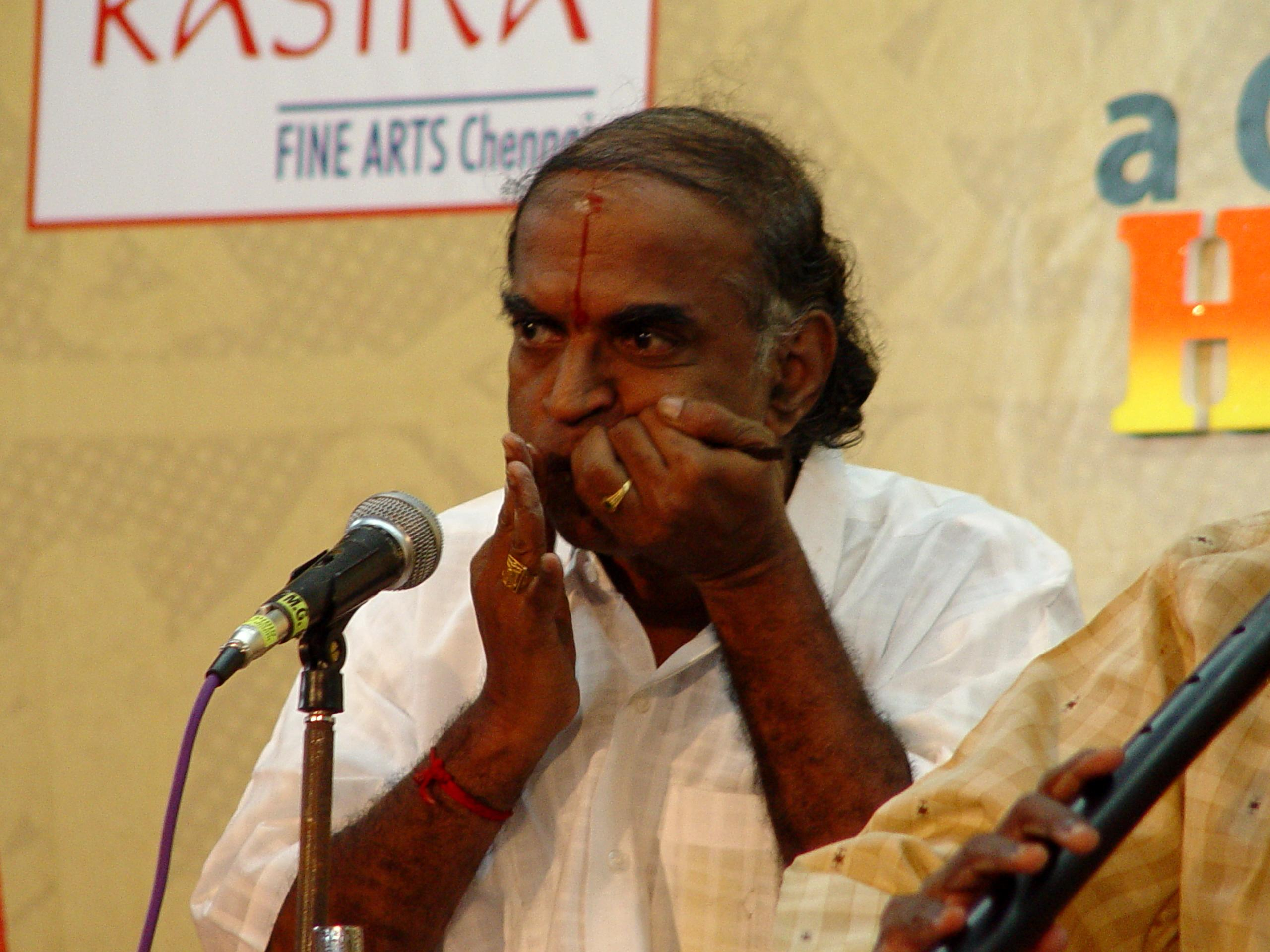
Morsing by Srirangam Kannan

Morsing

The morsing is placed on the front teeth, with slightly pouted lips and held firmly in the hand. It is struck using the index finger of the other hand to produce sound. Movement of the player's tongue while making nasal sounds is used to change the pitch. This can be achieved when the syllable /ŋg/ or a variant thereof, is sounded through the nose while air is pushed out or pulled in through the mouth. This aids the meditation process and thus some players use it as a form of practising pranayama. Others speak into the instruments while playing, thus giving it the effect of a light haunting echo.

The morsing is firmly held in the hand, the frame or the ring between the palm and the fingers usually in the left hand. Care should be taken to see that the middle part or the metal tongue is not being touched when held idle. Then the upper of the two parallel forks is firmly pressed against the front upper teeth; the lower fork, against the front lower teeth with the lips helping to keep the contact, so that the metal tongue will not contact the teeth when it moves. The trigger is plucked with the tip of the index finger. Sound is produced due to the vibration of the metal tongue that is transferred through the teeth and sounds in mouth and nasal cavity. Movement of the player's tongue with constant plucking can produce very fast patterns of sound. By constricting the space in the mouth the nostrils can produce sounds in different phases, similar to phasers in electronic music.

While traditionally made of iron, variants can be made from brass, wood, bone, and even plastic and credit cards.

== Tuning ==
The basic pitch of the instrument can be varied very little. Significantly, the pitch of the instrument can only be reduced and not increased. To reduce the pitch a little, beeswax can be applied on the plucking end. To increase the pitch, it can be filed, although this may damage the instrument.

== Advanced playing and the art of accompaniment ==
In Carnatic music, the morsing is usually played along with the mridangam or dhol, so it is necessary to know the syllables or aural interpretation of what is played on mridangam. It is important to know the aural representation of the ferns (pattern of syllables played on percussion instruments) played on mridangam as it is being silently recited while playing the morsing. This vocal art of reciting the syllables played on the mridangam is called konnakol. But while playing on morsing you don't actually make sound of reciting the syllable but just move your tongue that way so that the air passages gets blocked and cleared in a pattern so as to produce the sound of the ferns. It is essential to follow the mridangam and play the same ferns as far as possible, though it is difficult owing to the limitations of the instrument.

Glimpses of uniqueness and versatility of the morsing can be shown when accompanying singly for the song or during neraval or swara prastara (stages of song rendition in Carnatic music). The morsing is played as a shadow of the mridangam throughout the concert and the instrument's capabilities should be exhibited when playing or accompanying alone or during Thani (percussion round in a concert) or talavadyas (percussion ensembles).

Though working on completely different principles, the music of the Morchang sounds similar to that emanating from the Australian didgeridoo.

== Variants around the world ==
The Morchang exists, in nearly the same form and design all over the world, and is called by different names (estimated to be around 900) in different languages. For example: Morchang/Morsing (India and Bangladesh), Changu (Pakistan), Murchunga (Nepal), Kou-Xian (China), Vargan (Russia), Munnharpe (Norway), Zanboorak (Iran), Maultrommel (Germany), Guimbarde (France), Marranzano (Italy), Doromb (Hungary), Dambrelis (Lithuania) and Drymba (Ukraine). It may have spread and been shared between countries through the ancient trade routes between Asia and Europe, including the Silk route. There is a theory according to which the popular name Jew's harp is a corruption of the name jaw harp. This theory is described by the Oxford English Dictionary (OED) as "baseless and inept". The OED says that, "More or less satisfactory reasons may be conjectured: e.g. that the instrument was actually made, sold, or imported to England by Jews, or purported to be so; or that it was attributed to them, as a good commercial name, suggesting the trumps and harps mentioned in the Bible."

== Notable players ==
Players of the instrument are sometimes called Morsingists. Current day players include Bhagyalakshmi M. Krishna, Sundar N., Minjur M. Yagnaraman, Bejjanki V. Ravi Kiran, Ortal Pelleg, Valentinas, Viaceslavas, the Barmer Boys, T. S. Nandakumar and a number of Rajasthani folk music players from the traditional entertainer tribe of Laggas. Morsingists from earlier eras include Abraham Lincoln, the Russian Tsar Peter the Great and Mannargudi Natesa Pillai, Hariharasharma (father of Vikku Vinayagaram), Pudukkottai Mahadevan, Srirangam Kannan and Kalaimamani A. S. Krishnan, Mysore M. Gururaj, Bharadwaj R. Sathavalli and the great late L. Bhimachar from South India.
