= Deze =

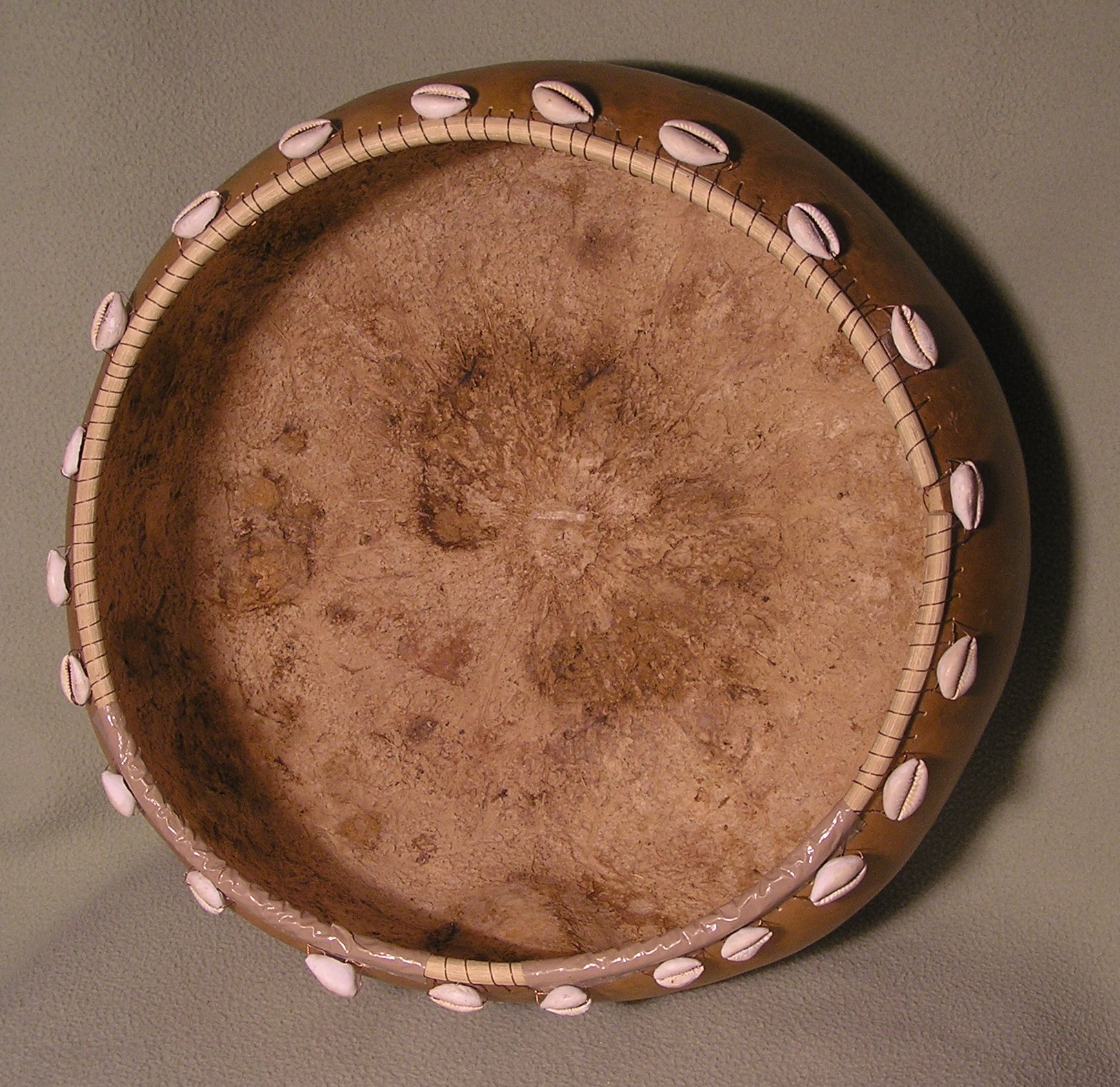
A deze

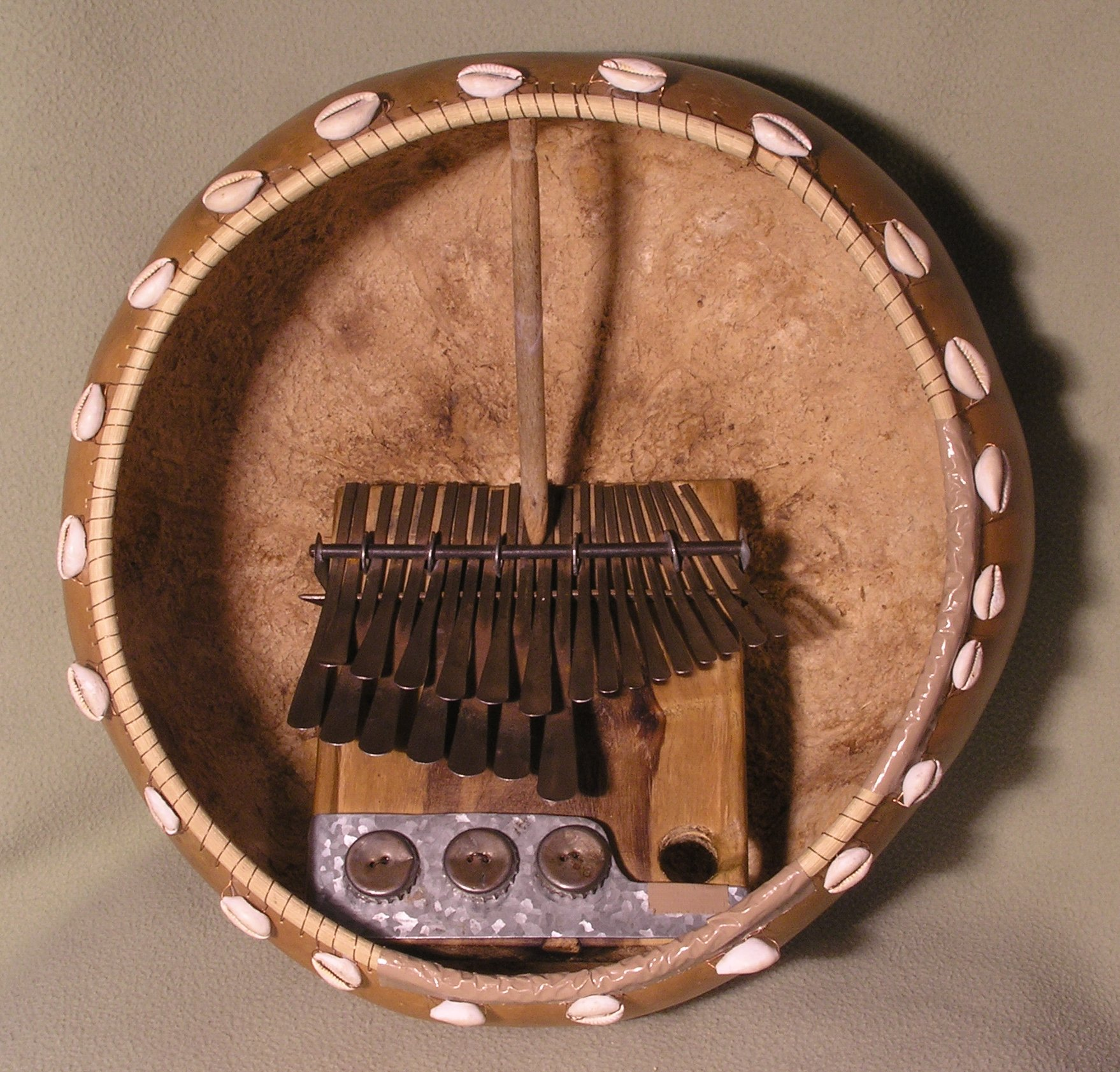
Deze with an mbira Dzavadzimu in the typical configuration

In Zimbabwean Shona music, a deze is a halved calabash gourd that an mbira is placed into to amplify its sound. It is typically round and has bottle caps, shells or other objects strung around its perimeter to vibrate with the mbira, creating a buzzing sound. Cracked deze frequently are repaired by wire stitching. Because of the size of the deze, audience members cannot see the mbira players' hands. Because of this, it is not uncommon for those who want to learn the mbira to play the hosho first, so that they can stand behind the players (in a traditional band) to see into deze and learn by observation. Modern deze are often constructed out of fiberglass and epoxy for increased durability. However, some mbira players, like Chartwell Dutiro, critique the use of fiberglass dezes in live performance. Dutiro says it compromises the resonance of the mbira and thus hinders communication with dza vadzimu (ancestral spirits).

== See also ==
- Hosho (instrument)
- Shona music
- Music of Africa
- Music of Zimbabwe

=== Further reading ===
- Berliner, Paul. (1978). The Soul of Mbira: music and traditions of the Shona people of Zimbabwe. Berkeley : University of California Press.
- Tracey, Andrew. (1970). How to play the mbira (dza vadzimu). Roodepoort, Transvaal, South Africa: International Library of African Music.
- Tracey, Hugh. (1969). The Mbira class of African Instruments in Rhodesia (1932). African Music Society Journal, 4:3, 78-95.
