= List of scholars of African music =

The following people are known for their scholarly contributions to the ethnomusicology of the music of Africa:

- V. Kofi Agawu (born 1956), professor of music and African and African-American studies at Harvard; studied music of the Ewe people of Ghana
- Paul Berliner (born 1946), won ASCAP Deems Taylor Award for his ethnomusicology book on the Zimbabwean mbira
- John Blacking (1928–1990), earned doctorate at University of the Witwatersrand for his work on Venda children's songs
- Akin Euba (born 1935), composer and ethnomusicologist of West African music, founded the theory of African pianism
- Arthur Morris Jones (1889–1980), early 20th century missionary who published two-volume Studies in African Music
- Gerhard Kubik (born 1934), author of books on the theory of African music and on the African roots of American music
- Alan P. Merriam (1923-1980), author of African Music in Perspective
- Joseph Hanson Kwabena Nketia (born 1921)
- Andrew Tracey (born 1936)
- Hugh Tracey (1903–1977), founding director of the International Library of African Music
- Colin Turnbull (1924–1994)
