= Forward Kwenda =

Zimbabwean mbira performer

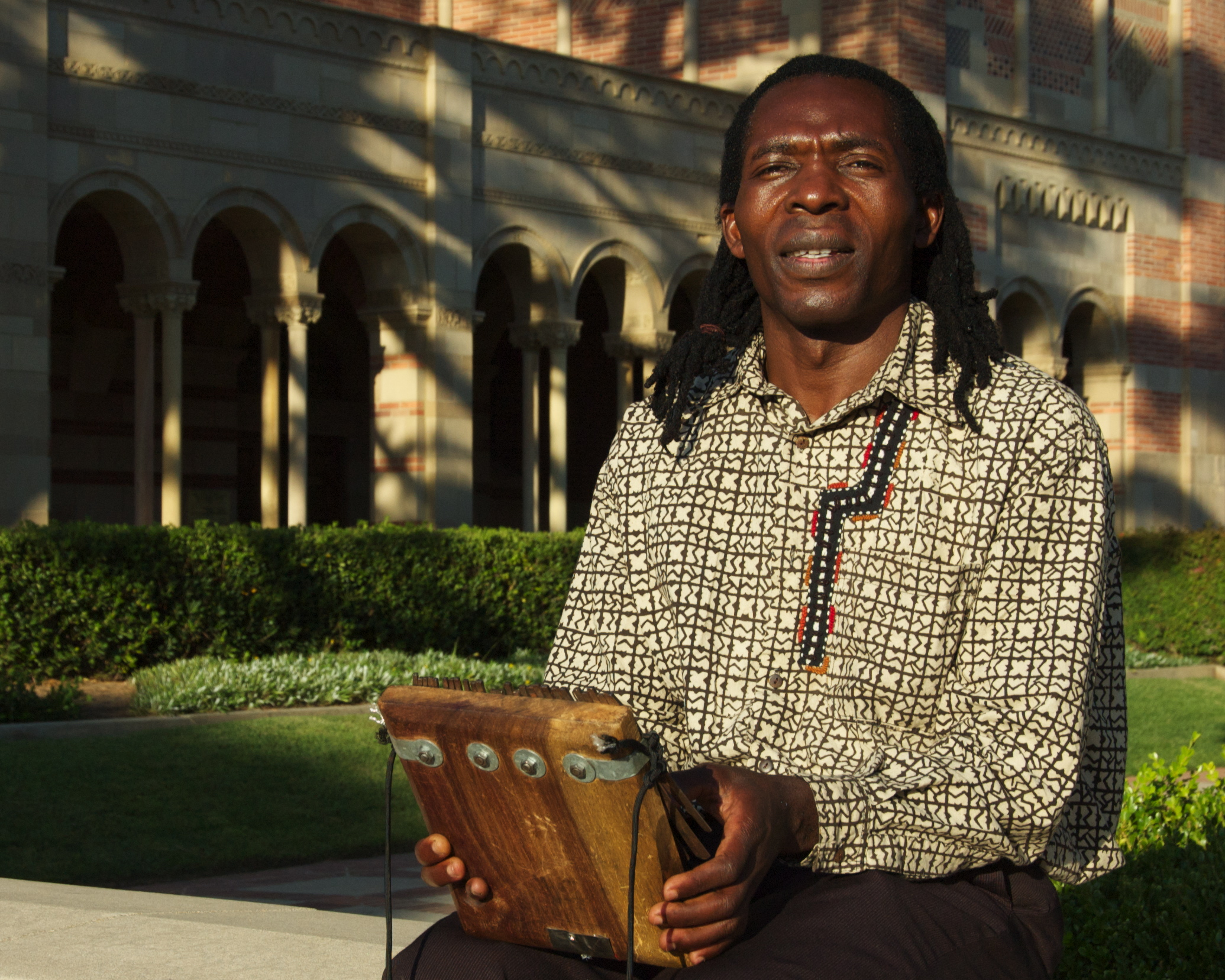
Forward Kwenda playing mbira near Royce Hall on the campus of UCLA, October 10, 2011

Forward Kwenda is a mbira performer from Zimbabwe. He was given the name "Forward" due to his involvement in many activities, including his performances for guerrilla forces during the Rhodesian Bush War.

== Early life ==
He was born in the rural Buhera area of Manicaland. As a young boy, Forward was interested in traditional dance and the recitation of ancient poetry. At the age of 10, he began to play ngoma (drums) and hosho (gourd rattles) for his mother's "gombwe (rain-making) spirit" . At an early age, Forward borrowed a mbira and self-taught with the occasional radio programs

== Career ==
In 1984, Kwenda moved to Zimbabwe's capital city of Harare and began to play mbira with other musicians. Within a year, he had formed his own mbira group and was making records and performing on national radio, as well as performing constantly at mapira ceremonies. During this period, he claimed that he was informed by powerful rain-making spirits that he was to devote his life to playing mbira for their ceremonies. He was known for bringing the "desired spirits" to a ceremony by the end of the first ceremony song.

In 1985, Forward began playing in a style considered in Shona culture to be "more ancient because spirits prefer it." This style was first recorded in 1985 and 1986 by his American friend Glenn Makuna, who dubbed Kwenda "the Coltrane of mbira". The makombwe, believed to be the ancestors of all mankind, supposedly prefer Kwenda's ancient style and come to earth as soon as he begins playing his mbira. Kwenda claimed, "It's not me, my spirits just play through me."

Asked about his experience playing mbira, Forward responded:

When I pick up my mbira, I don't know what is going to happen. The music just goes by itself, taking me higher and higher until I can end up crying because the music is so much greater than a human being can understand... I just have to get out of the way so spirits can make my mbira play—it isn't me—I'm just amazed.

In 1997, Kwenda toured the United States with Erica Azim, and recorded the Shanachie CD Svikiro: Meditations of an Mbira Master. In February 2000, Kwenda performed at the Kennedy Center in Washington, DC, with Erica Azim and toured North America with her during 2000, 2001 and 2002.

In 2019, Kwenda coauthored the book Learn to Play Mbira : Traditional Songs and Improvisation with the author Andy Fowler. On January 1, 2020, they launched the mbira master video and tablature archiving project mbira.online, within which Forward is the predominant tutor and performer. Forward and Andy now work together at Mbira Magic with the goal of promoting mbira music and creating employment for Zimbabwean musicians.

== See also ==
- Mbira
- Shona music
- Zimbabwe
