= Kushaura =

In Shona music, the kushaura is the leading part. Compare with the kutsinhira part.

The kushaura can be thought of being the first part, with the kutsinhira usually being a beat behind, within a cycle of 12 beats. However, this is not always the case. Furthermore, certain parts are both kushaura and kutsinhira parts, depending on where they are played. Typically a kushaura of this type is played a beat behind to make a kutsinhira.

In the most standard form, both kushaura and kutsinhira parts can be conceptualized as a repetition of a sequence of four cycles in a western 12/8 meter with all notes falling exactly on one of the twelve eighth-note subdivisions. However the beginning of the cycle is not standardized, and may be different for different regions, players, and musical parts. In general the primary beat of the hosho falls on every three subdivisions, which can result in a 4/4-like sound. However the kushaura or kutsinhira parts also come in varieties that typically sound as a 3/4 part to most westerners. In this case, the two parts, nominally 4/4 and 3/4, combine in a polyrhythm encompassed by the conceptualization of the piece as 12/8, and sync at every 12 eighth notes. Some kushaura parts may sound like they begin with an upbeat to the western ear, whereas the first note actually lands on the beat itself.

Both kushaura and kutsinhira parts typically have high lines played by the right hand (on the right manual of the mbira dzavadzimu), and these lines tend to be composed of notes that alternate on every other eighth note. The other defining feature of the kushaura in contrast with the kustinhira is that these high line notes are in alternating opposition to the notes of the kutsinhira, forming an interlocked high line composed of the right hand notes of both players. In many transcriptions, the first right hand note of the kushaura will fall on the eighth note immediately after the first hosho beat, whereas the kutsinhira's will fall directly on this beat—however since the beginning of a given cycle is somewhat arbitrary, this description is context-specific to these standard conceptualizations of the beginnings. Viewing a single line, especially in the left hand (lower) part, changing the perceived beginning of the cycle will often change the perceptual modal structure of the line.

Example from Nhemamusasa (using western approximation of notes)

- version 1: CCEEAA CCFFAA DDFFAA CCEEGG
- version 2: FFAADD FFAACC EEGGCC EEAACC (same notes, different cycle divisions)

Typically the player playing the kushaura part leads the performance in choosing variations to play, whereas the kutsinhira player will attempt to follow that lead with complementary parts. Variations exist for both the right hand, and left hand. Some variations of the left hand are almost exclusively played on the upper left manual, entirely avoiding the bottom left one.

Typical to the right hand part are repeating notes, as well as descending, but not ascending, lines, for example:

1. GGGGFEDD GGFEDDBB DDCCBBAA (Taireva, separated into three descending lines)
2. FFEEDDCCBAGG EEDDCCBBAAGG (Nhemamusasa, separated into two descending lines)

In the right hand, the most common chord is the octave composed of the far-left key played with the thumb, and the fourth key, played with the index finger. In the left hand, consecutive octaves and fifths are common, whereas thirds of chords are generally avoided, and chords entirely within the left hand are not played on most typical instruments, because only a single digit, the thumb, is used.

== Kutsinhira ==
This section refers to the Shona musical part. For the Cultural Arts Center located in Eugene, OR, see Kutsinhira Cultural Arts Center.

In Shona music, the kutsinhira is the following part. The kutsinhira is often a beat behind the kushaura part. More generally, the kutsinhira is the part that is more, or mostly off the beat when compared to the kushaura.

Usually the kushaura player begins to lead the direction of the improvisation, and the kutsinhira player follows or otherwise responds, especially with regard to particular registers, low or high. Emergent high and low lines are then composed of the interlocking of the kutsinhira part with the kushaura, rather than the lines of any one player alone.

== See also ==
- Mbira

=== Further reading ===
- Berliner, Paul. (1978). The Soul of Mbira: music and traditions of the Shona people of Zimbabwe. Berkeley : University of California Press.
