= African Music (journal) =

- Discipline: Ethnomusicology
- Language: English
- Edited by: Lee Watkins

Publication details
- Former name: African Music Society Newsletter
- History: 1948-current
- Publisher: International Library of African Music
- Frequency: Annual
- Open access: Delayed, two-years

Standard abbreviations
- ISO 4: Afr. Music

Indexing
- ISSN: 0065-4019 (print); 2524-2741 (web)
- LCCN: 60045755
- JSTOR: 00654019
- OCLC no.: 1036109

Links
- Journal homepage; Online access; Online archive

African Music is an annual peer-reviewed academic journal published by the International Library of African Music. It covers contextualized studies of African music and related arts. Articles are made freely accessible after a two-year embargo period.

== History ==
The journal was originally established as the African Music Society Newsletter in 1948, and renamed itself African Music in 1954, in the same year as the International Library of African Music. Tracey was the first editor-in-chief until his death in 1977. Publication was interrupted from 2000 until 2007. Since it was re-launched in 2007, the journal includes a collection of music performances and audio examples relating to articles published within the respective issues.

=== Editors-in-chief ===
The following persons are or have been editor-in-chief of the journal:

- 1948-1953: ?
- 1954–1977: Hugh Tracey
- 1977–1999: Andrew Tracey
- 2007–2016: Diane Thram
- 2017–current: Lee Watkins

== Abstracting and indexing ==
The journal is abstracted and indexed in:

- Academic Search Premier
- International Bibliography of the Social Sciences
- Modern Language Association Database
- Music Index
- Répertoire International de Littérature Musicale
