= Chemirocha =

1950s ethnomusicology recordings from Kenya

"Chemirocha" is a series of three field recordings made in 1950 by ethnomusicologist Hugh Tracey during his visit to the Kipsigis people of the Great Rift Valley of Kenya. The tribe had previously heard the recordings of American country singer Jimmie Rodgers, which they integrated to their musical culture.

In 2014, the International Library of African Music returned to Kapkatet, the town where the songs were recorded, to present the digitized version of them to the locals.

== Recording ==
During World War II, English Christian missionaries visited the Kipsigis tribe of the Great Rift Valley of Kenya. The missionaries took with them a wind-up gramophone and recordings of American singer Jimmie Rodgers. In 1950, ethnomusicologist Hugh Tracey moved to the region as he continued to help his brother working on a tobacco farm. On the side, Tracey travelled with a reel-to-reel device and he made field recordings of traditional African songs.

"Chemirocha III"
Throughout the song, the performers call Rodgers "Chemirocha"

In the town of Kapkatet, district chief Arapsang organized the singers for Tracey to record three different songs that he would later entitle "Chemirocha I", "Chemirocha II" and "Chemirocha III". "Chemirocha III" was sung by young girls with high-pitched voices as they danced, and it was accompanied by a stringed instrument called a kibugandet. "Chemirocha" was the pronunciation that the tribe used to refer to Jimmie Rodgers, who they considered to be a half man, half antelope faun. The lyrics described that the songs performed by the being caused a level of happiness on the villagers that would "make their clothes fall off". The song was credited to "Chemutoi Ketienya with Kipsigis girls". Meanwhile, "Chemirocha I" and "Chemirocha II" were sung by men and they expressed the Kipsigis' love for their locale and their lament for it being taken by colonization. The term "Chemirocha" was, among other things, used to describe something strange and new. Tracey misinterpreted the meaning of Rodgers' music to the Kipsigis as a cargo cult, as he described Rodgers as "the spirit to whom young Kipsigi maidens appeal as they sing their song, Chemirocha, and seductively invite him to dance with them".

== Release ==
In 1954, Tracey created the International Library of African Music to preserve the 40,000 recordings he made during his trips to several tribes. "Chemirocha III" was released by Tracey on his 1972 album The Music of Africa: Musical Instruments 1: Strings. After Tracey's death in 1977, his son Andrew Tracey took over the role of president until 2005. Diane Thram then succeeded Tracey's son as the curator of the collection. Thram started a project to digitize the recordings, and she turned to the label Ketebul Music to take the results to the villages in which they had been recorded. In 2015, the team was able to find Cheriyot Arap Kuri, an original singer in "Chemirocha I", who declared that at the time he did not know what Tracey was doing while recording and that the tribe sang to entertain him. Interpretations offered by the villagers of the word "Chemirocha" included it being "slow, nice music", as well as "Jimmie" being used to refer to a "tough guy". As for the mention of Rodgers as a faun, the son of chief Arapsang, Josiah, offered as an explanation that the mistreatment of the Kipsigis by the colonial government made the tribe consider them "man-eaters".
