= Matepe =

Type of lamellophone played in North-Eastern Zimbabwe

A Zimbabwean matepe

The matepe is a type of lamellophone played in North-Eastern Zimbabwe. It is primarily played by the Sena Tonga and the Kore-Kore peoples which are subgroups of the Shona people.

It is one of the five main types of mbira played in Zimbabwe. The matepe is an umbrella term for many mbira-style instruments such as hera, matepe, and madhebhe.

The matepe, according to Sekuru Chigamba, has soundboards that are made of wood from mutiti (Erythrina abyssinica) or mupepe (Commiphora marlothii) trees.

The matepe has a different playing style than other mbira in that it uses both thumbs and both index fingers. The keys are also thinner and longer compared to the mbira. Four or five independent melodies are played simultaneously in traditional matepe music. The traditional music is used for spirit possession ceremonies, known in Zimbabwe as a bira ceremony.

The music is constituted by interlocking musical parts, creating rhythmic lines of great polyrhythmic intricacy and variety. The harmonic sequences upon which the music is based can be understood in fractal mathematical terms.
