= International Library of African Music =

- 33°18′39″S 26°31′08″E
- Location: Grahamstown, Eastern Cape, South Africa
- Scope: African music
- Established: 1954

Other information
- Director: Dr Lee Watkins
- Website: www.ru.ac.za/ilam/

The International Library of African Music (ILAM) is an organization dedicated to the preservation and study of African music. Seated in Grahamstown, South Africa, ILAM is attached to the Music Department at Rhodes University and coordinates its Ethnomusicology Programme which offers undergraduate and post-graduate degrees in Ethnomusicology that include training in performance of African music. ILAM, as the largest repository of indigenous African music, is particularly known for its study of the lamellophone mbira of Zimbabwe and Mozambique, as well as the Chopi people's Timbila, a variant of the marimba from southern Mozambique.

Some of the instruments inside ILAM.

The akadinda (large xylophone), kalimbas on the wall, and a photo of Hugh Tracey.

== Publications and recordings ==
- Journal of the International Library of African Music albums are available for digital download at Smithsonian Folkways Recordings' website.
- As part of the Rhodes University's support for Open Access to research output and primary research materials, the journal African Music in being made accessible freely online, with a two-year embargo on the latest issues.

== History ==
ILAM was founded by ethnomusicologist Hugh Tracey in 1954, made possible through grants received from the Nuffield Foundation and the South African Department of Education.

ILAM published the African Music Society Journal, now known as the African Music. ILAM was initially located in Msaho (near Roodepoort, Gauteng). When Hugh Tracey died in 1977, his son Andrew took over as director. Private funding had dried up, but Rhodes University agreed to host ILAM, and both ILAM and AMI moved to Grahamstown in 1978. Andrew Tracey served as director until 2005, after which Diane Thram served as the director. The current director is Dr. Lee Watkins.

== Notable collections ==
The following collections are available online:

- Hugh Tracey Audio Collections
- Jaco Kruger Collections

== See also ==
- Music of Africa
- Music of Zimbabwe
- Music of Mozambique
- Hugh Tracey
- Andrew Tracey
- Paul Berliner
- Mbira
- Kalimba
- Zimbabwean Marimba
- Ethnomusicology
- Rhodes University
