= Shona music =

Overview of music traditions of the Shona

Shona music is the music of the Shona people of Zimbabwe. There are several different types of traditional Shona music including mbira, singing, hosho and drumming. Very often, this music will be accompanied by dancing, and participation by the audience. In the Shona style of music, there is little distinction between the performer and the audience. Both are often actively involved in the music-making and both are important in the Shona religious ceremonies.

== Mbira ==
The mbira is a traditional instrument of the Shona people often used in religious ceremonies. There are several different varieties of mbira including the mbira dzavadzimu and mbira nyunga nyunga.

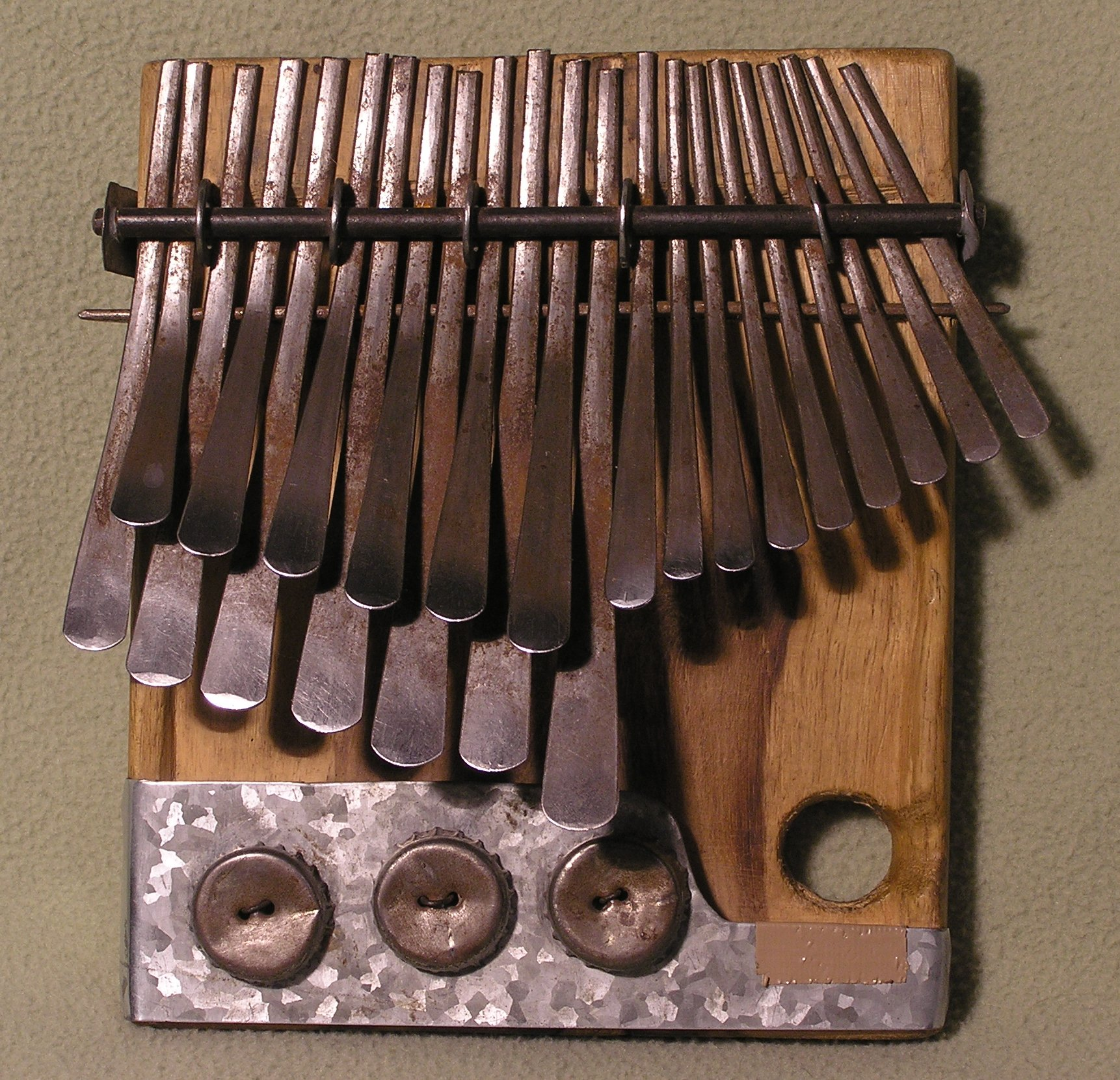
An Mbira dzavadzimu

Shona music is well known as representative of mbira ("thumb piano") music. The performer of the "kushaura" (lead mbira part) often acts also as the lead vocalist, selecting a known melody or mbira pattern to accompany selected lyrics, usually a phrase or a few lines of text which are then commented upon improvisationally. The performer of the "kutsinira" (second mbira part) plays a pattern which interlocks with the "kushaura" in a way that creates the repeated notes which identify mbira music. The "kutsinira" part is sometimes the same part as the "kushaura", but following the kushaura one pulse behind. The mbira players are accompanied by another less active singer who plays the hosho (a rattle) and responds to the improvised lyrics of the singer and, most importantly, embellishes and complements the lead vocal melody. (Garfias 1971)

== Drumming ==
Drums are always associated with dance and can be used for various dances.

=== Mhande drums ===
1. Shauro- used for the lead rhythm
2. Tsinhiro- used for the response rhythm

=== 4Dinhe drums ===
1. Mhito – used for the lead rhythm
2. Mitumba miviri- used for the response rhythm

=== Chokoto drums ===
(these are two headed)

1. Chimudumbana – small, for lead rhythm
2. Chigubha – big, for response rhythm

== Hosho ==
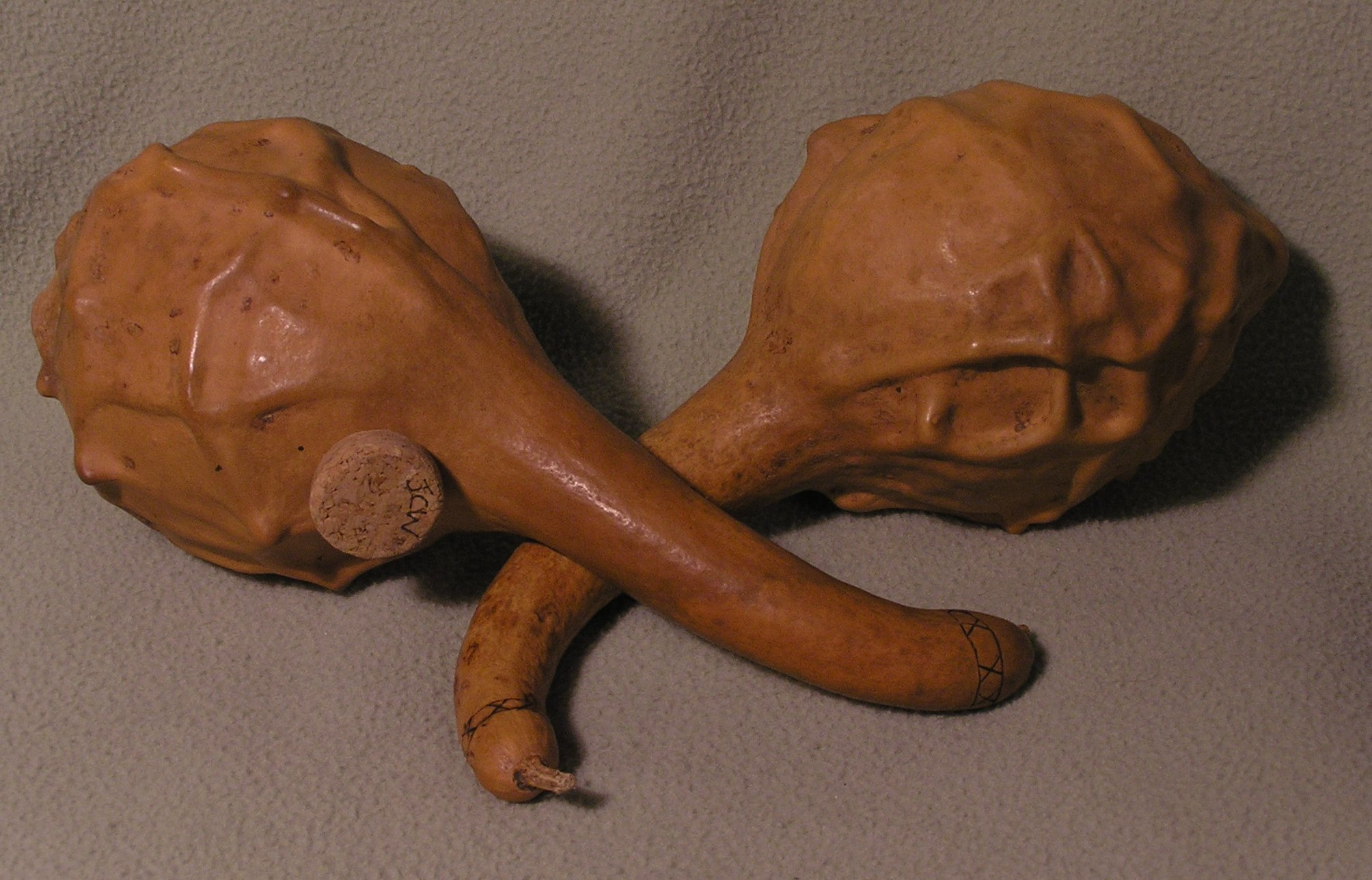
A pair of hosho

Shona music is often accompanied by the hosho, a hollowed-out maranka gourd containing hota seeds or other objects that is shaken to generate a sound.

== Ancient Shona music ==
Traditional ancient Shona musics consist of mbira dzavadzimu played by multiple players, hosho and ngoma drums. Ancient shona music is mainly played at spiritual ceremonies called bira.

== Modern ==
Traditional Shona music has been adapted to modern instruments such as electric guitars and western drumsets, for example by musicians such as Thomas Mapfumo, Stella Chiweshe, and Oliver Mtukudzi. This music is also associated with the Chimurenga movement.

== Shona music in the West ==
Shona music has become popular in the West and even in the East such as Japan. Shona mbira has been taught in British and American Universities in musicology classes. Transcriptions carried out as part of fieldwork. In the United States, Shona music has become popular in Colorado, California, the Pacific Northwest and in some places of Argentina, largely due to the seeding influence of musicians including Dumisani Maraire, Ephat Mujuru, Thomas Mapfumo and Erica Azim.

=== Shona music on marimba ===
Shona marimbas are diatonic and are made with F#s and without. They are different from other marimbas through their larger keys and resonators beneath the keys (to produce a buzzing sound). There are four kinds of marimba played in a band, namely bass, baritone, tenor and soprano. Bass has the largest keys and resonators and the shortest range, requiring large sticks to play. Baritone is the next in size, with one octave more than the bass. It also has large resonators and large sticks, although not as large as bass. Tenor and soprano use the same sticks. Tenor has two octaves, with the higher octave being the same as the lower octave of soprano. Soprano plays the lead part, with tenor providing rhythm. Bass and baritone play similar parts, forming the backbone of the song. Marimba is very popular in schools in Zimbabwe, with most schools having at least one band.

== Musicians ==
- Chartwell Dutiro
- Chiwoniso Maraire
- Chris Berry
- Cosmas Magaya
- Dumisani Maraire
- Ephat Mujuru
- Erica Azim
- Forward Kwenda
- Fabio Chivhanda
- Herbert Schwamborn
- James Chimombe
- Oliver Mtukudzi
- Stella Chiweshe
- Tendayi Gahamadze
- Hope Masike
- Thomas Mapfumo
- Jah Prayzah
- Leonard Dembo

== See also ==
- Chimurenga
- Ngororombe
- Marimba (Zimbabwean)
- Music of Africa
- Music of Zimbabwe
- Shona language
- Shona people
- Bantu language
- Zimbabwe
- List of Zimbabwean musicians

== Recordings ==
- Nonesuch Explorer Series 79703-2, Zimbabwe: The African Mbira: Music of the Shona People (2002). Liner notes by Robert Garfias (1971).
- Nonesuch Explorer Series 79704 Zimbabwe: The Soul of Mbira: Traditions of the Shona People (1973). Produced by Paul Berliner
- Musical instruments 2: (LP) Reeds (Mbira). (1972) The Music of Africa series. 1 LP disc. 33 1/3 rpm. mono. 12 in. Recorded by Hugh Tracey. Kaleidophone, KMA 2.
- Mbira Music of Rhodesia, Performed by Abram Dumisani Maraire. (1972). Seattle: University of Washington Press, Ethnic Music Series. Garfias, R. (Ed.). 1 LP disc. 33 1/3 rpm. mono. 12 in. UWP-1001. This disc features Maraire exclusively on Nyunga Nyunga mbira. A 12-page booklet by Maraire is included, describing the background, composition, and performance of nyunga-nyunga mbira music.
