= Albert Chimedza =

Albert Chimedza (born 1955) is a Zimbabwean poet and founder of the Mbira Centre. His only collection of poetry, Counterpoint was published in 1984, together with Hopewell Seyaseya. Over the years, Chimedza has focused his energy on promoting the mbira, a unique traditional instrument that has been played for more than 1,000 years. The mbira is integral to the traditions and cultural identity of the Shona people of Zimbabwe.

== Career ==
Though Chimedza is an all round creative who has dabbled in film, poetry and other creative arts in Zimbabwe, he is famous for his work in promoting the mbira. For Chimedza, the mbira is part of Zimbabwe's cultural heritage. At the Mbira Centre, a workshop he runs from Harare, Chimedza and a group of skilled craftsmen, spend days and weeks, making these little musical instruments. In February 2014, the centre started a 'Mbira in the Schools' campaign in partnership with the Culture Fund of Zimbabwe and the European Union Programme for Arts and Culture Development.

== Bibliography ==
Counterpoint (written with Hopewell Seyaseya), College Press, 1984.
