= Bira ceremony =

Bira is an all-night ritual, celebrated by Shona people from Zimbabwe in which members of an extended family call on ancestral spirits for guidance and intercession. Shona people believe that the only ones who can communicate with both the living and God are the ancestral spirits, or dzavadzimu. These spirits are summoned during the Bira ceremonies through the use of music and ritual dance. Bira ceremonies are also held to welcome back the spirit of an ancestor into the home where a family member is a svikiro who is occasionally possessed by one or more ancestors.

The attendees at a ceremony participate in singing, dancing and hand clapping. The two mbira players are joined by a player on a pair of gourd shakers (hosho), which emphasize the underlying triplet beat. The mbira playing and singing are all improvised off the familiar basic patterns, resulting in a constantly changing polyphonic texture.

In this ceremony, music that was favored by the ancestors when they were alive is used to summon the spirits to possess living mediums; thus the religious belief system helps to preserve older musical practices.
