= Erica Azim =

Zimbabwean musician

Erica Kundidzora Azim is a musician who has worked in Zimbabwe and Berkeley, California, she is known for her expertise with Shona mbira music. She collaborates with Fradreck Mujuru who also makes traditional instruments. The two of them have played together in 2016 in America.

== Recordings ==
Mbira - Healing Music of Zimbabwe The Relaxation Company CD, 2000

Mbira Dreams The Relaxation Company CD 3261 and cassette, 1996

"Nyama musango" on Belief: A Collection of World Sacred Music Beliefnet CD 1001, 2000

"Mwanangu" on Mama’s Lullaby and Mother Earth Lullaby Ellipsis Arts CDs 4291 and 4293, March 2001 and 2002

"Nyama musango" (background for Peter Matthiesen reading from "Sand Rivers") on The Naturalists Audio Literature, 1997

with Forward Kwenda: Forward Kwenda - Svikiro: Meditations of an Mbira Master Shanachie CD 64095, 1997 (extensive liner notes by Erica Azim)
