= Mwali =

Mwali may refer to:

- Mohéli, an island that is part of the Union of the Comoros
- Mwari, the Shona high god
