= Stella Chiweshe =

Zimbabwean musician (1946–2023)

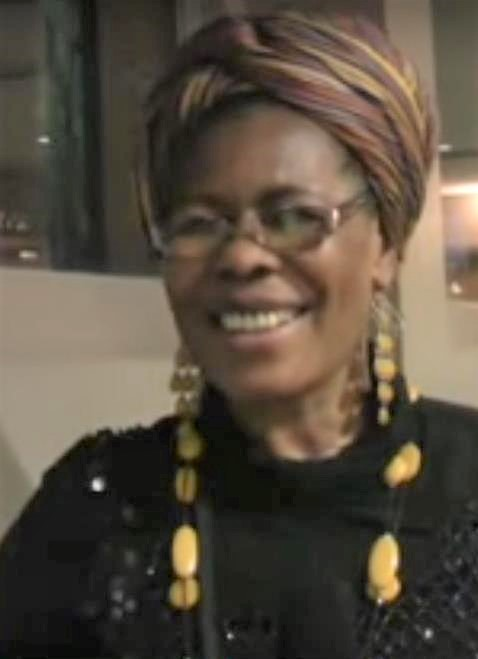
- Chiweshe in 2012
- Born: Stella Rambisai Chiweshe; 8 July 1946; Mhondoro, Southern Rhodesia
- Died: 20 January 2023 (aged 76); Harare, Zimbabwe
- Spouse: Peter Reich
- Children: Virginia Mukwesha Charity Mapuranga nee Mkwesha
- Website: www.stellachiweshe.com

Stella Chiweshe (also Stella Rambisai Chiweshe, Stella Rambisai Chiweshe Nekati, Mbuya Stella Chiweshe, or Stella Nekati Chiweshe; 8 July 1946 – 20 January 2023) was a Zimbabwean musician. She was known internationally for her singing and playing of the mbira dzavadzimu, a traditional instrument of the Shona people of Zimbabwe. She was one of few female players, and learned to play from 1966 to 1969, when other women did not.

== Biography ==
Chiweshe was born on 8 July 1946 in Mujumi Village in Mhondoro. She learned to play the mbira from 1966 to 1969, at a time when there were social taboos against women playing the instrument, as well as colonial British prohibitions on cultural activities. She was taught by her great-uncle, after being refused by many teachers. During this period Chiweshe also performed forbidden Shona spiritual ceremonies.

During the 1970s her music supported nationalist and women's rights causes. Her career as a recording artist began in 1974 with the release of the single 'Kasahwa' (Teal Records). In 1981 she joined the National Dance Company of Zimbabwe, playing the mbira, and toured with them internationally. During the 1980s, to continue a revitalisation of mbira music, Chiweshe amplified her mbira and introduced electric instruments to her supporting band. In 1985 she formed her first band The Earthquake. In 1988 Chiweshe recorded two black liberationist songs, 'Chimurenga' and 'NeHondo'. She also helped to form the Zimbabwe Musicians Union. During this period she also played the titular role in the film Ambuya Nehanda, which portrayed the life of Mbuya Nehanda, an anti-colonial resistance leader.

Chiweshe performed numerous times in Germany and also participated in the WOMAD festival (1994 in the United States, 1995 in Australia, and 2006 in Spain). In 2004 she toured England with her daughter. She was known for her spiritual presence on stage, and for often taking snuff while performing.

Chiweshe died of brain cancer on 20 January 2023, at the age of 76. Her husband was Peter Reich, a German citizen. She also lived in Germany for several years. Her daughter is the mbira player Virginia Mukwesha, whom Chiweshe trained from a young age.

On 21 January 2023 the government of Zimbabwe offered financial support for her funeral.

== Awards ==
- Billboard Music Award (1993)
- Zimbabwe Music Silver Jubilee Awards – Female Most Outstanding Contribution to the Music Industry of the Past 25 Years (2005)
- Zimbabwe Music Silver Jubilee Awards – Best Mbira Artiste of the Past 25 Years (2005)
- National Arts Merit Award (2006)
- National Arts Merit Award Lifetime Achievement Award (2020)
- National Arts Merit Award Legends Awards (2021)

== Legacy ==
Chiweshe is considered a ground-breaking Zimbabwean musician, not just for her skills, but for the path for women mbira-players that she forged. She was also admired for the humanism in her music.

During her career Chiweshe was criticised by some for combining sacred and commercial music. Her work was sampled by many artists, including The New Vets, a Zimbabwean activist rap group, who campaigned for land reform using a track Chiweshe sang on.

Chiweshe featured in Panashe Chigumadzi's 2018 work These Bones Will Rise Again.

== Discography ==
- Ambuya? (1987, reissued 2021)
- Ndizvozvo (Piranha, 1988)
- Chisi (1989)
- Kumusha (1990)
- Shungu (1994)
- Healing Tree: Best of Stella Chiweshe (1998)
- Talking Mbira: Spirits of Liberation (2002)
- Double Check (2006)
- Ndondopetera (2007)
- Chakandiwana – Stella Chiweshe & Michele Longo" (2014)
- Kasahwa: Early Singles (2018)

Contributing artist

- The Rough Guide to the Music of Zimbabwe (World Music Network, 1996)

== See also ==
- Mbira
- Music of Zimbabwe
