= Joseph H. Howard =

Joseph Hannibal Howard II (July 17, 1912–December 16, 1994), a dentist by profession, gathered what is arguably the "largest collection" of drums in the Americas. Dr. Howard and his wife Bootsie travelled around the world over a period of 40 years amassing this collection of 800 drums, representing the drums and other musical instruments of cultures from Alaska to Argentina and from California to the Pacific islands, as well as Africa and Asia. The importance of his collection has been noted by experts on folk instruments at the Smithsonian Institution and were part of a major touring exhibit with artifacts collected by Fernando Ortiz the Cuban ethnographer who defined Afro-Cuban culture and wrote 30 books on the subject.

== Biography ==
Howard was born in Holly Springs, Mississippi and raised in Chicago, Illinois. Howard was an oral surgeon by profession who collected drums from around the world in his spare time after finding out his father was Kenyan. Over the years he amassed the largest collection of authentic drums in the Americas. Recently, his collection has been featured, along with elements of the Fernando Ortiz estate in a touring exhibit Ritmos de Identidad by the Smithsonian Institution.

Growing up in Chicago, Howard was fascinated with rhythm and drumming. Before he owned even one drum he would make improvised instruments out of whatever was around him. He received a bachelor degree in 1935 from Fisk University, and his bachelor of science in dentistry in 1944 and his doctorate of dental surgery, both from the University of Illinois Chicago College of Dentistry. He also received a Masters of Arts in Education University of Illinois, where he was on the track team. He played basketball professionally for the Harlem Globetrotters from 1935 to 1937.

After marrying Tommye Berry in 1946 they relocated to Los Angeles in 1952, where Howard was exposed to a rich Latin drumming tradition. Berry had served in the United States Army with the 6888th Central Postal Directory Battalion during World War World War II and became a Master Sergeant. Howard's own mixed heritage, being of African, European and East Indian descent, was a constant backdrop to his musical interests. His daughter Victoria describes her father's passion as a "pursuit of identity through the eye of the drum." He often described his family as "the fruit of the cross of cultures."

== Collecting ==
Howard and his wife were passionate collectors. She preferred African art, while his primary interest was in all things musical, for he not only collected the drums of many nations. He also collected stamps, books, photos, instrument making techniques and instruments to accompany the drums. He had a particular interest in the musical heritage of the Djuka people of Suriname and not only collected their instruments, but also acquired elaborately hand-carved furniture, including the double doors to his home. At first glance many of these items could easily be confused with African artifacts, but stylistically African instruments have become more utilitarian over the years. As Dr. Howard pointed out, to this researcher, during a visit to his home the Djuka people had maintained their culture in stasis due to the isolated nature of their existence.

Because of the nature of his profession, Dr. Howard was able to arrange his schedule to accommodate yearly excursions abroad looking for folk instruments, which he defined as being those instruments that the folk actually used. In all of his collecting he always looked to purchase the instruments of the musicians themselves, as opposed to acquiring tourist versions of the instruments.

== Drums of the Americas ==
Over the years his research led him to write several books and articles including the classic book Drums in the Americas and a catalog of the instruments in his collection which was meticulously cross-referenced and indexed. Dr. Howard understood drums to be sources of cultural history and pride, as evidenced by their place of honor in his home.

The complete collection amounts to nearly 800 drums and other musical instruments from throughout the world. This ensemble represents musical traditions in Asia, the Pacific region, Europe, Africa and the Americas.

== Legacy ==
Following his death in 1994, Victoria Howard sought to keep the memory of her father alive by contracting with The Craft and Folk Art Museum to put on an exhibit of her father's instruments. The event was so successful that other museums, including the Smithsonian, created their own traveling exhibits using a selection of instruments from the collection and the estate of Fernando Ortiz.

Ritmos de Identidad: Fernando Ortíz's Legacy and the Howard Collection of Percussion Instruments features more than 80 rare musical instruments from Howard's collection. Included are hand-painted sacred and secular drums, rattles and other percussion instruments from the Caribbean, South America and West Africa. The exhibit includes a variety of instruments made from "found objects", such as - a hoe blade and jaw bone, right alongside artifacts employing complex strung heads and tuning mechanisms. The collection is on loan from Howard's daughter.

== Bibliography ==
- Howard, Joseph H. Drums in the Americas: the history and development of drums in the New World from the pre-Columbian era to modern times. New York: Oak Archives, 1967. ISBN 9780825601804
- Howard, Joseph H. Drums: From the Tropics to the Arctic Circle. Howard's Drum Collection Committee, 1982.

== Related Recordings ==
- Oyin Momo Ado by Babatunde Olatunji
- Raices Latinas: Smithsonian Folkways Latino Roots Collection
- Afro Roots by Mongo Santamaria
