= Shona people =

Bantu ethnic group native to Southern Africa

Shona
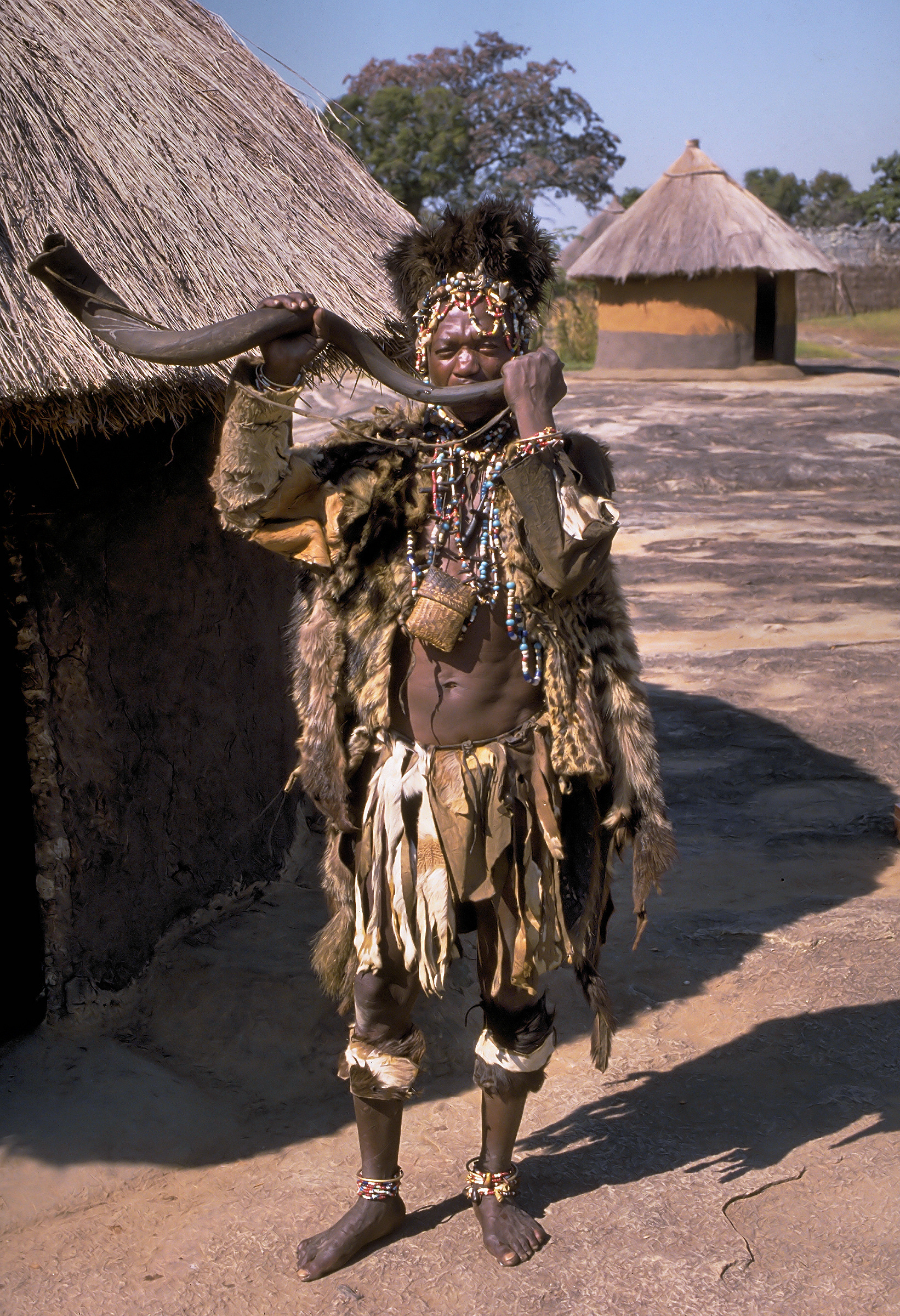

Total population
- c. 15.6 million

Regions with significant populations
- Zimbabwe: 13 million (2019)
- Mozambique: 2.3 million
- South Africa: 1–2 million (2020)
- Zambia: 30,200
- United Kingdom: 200,000 (2011)

Languages
- Native; Shona languages (mainly Shona); Also; English (in Zimbabwe, South Africa, and Zambia) • Portuguese (in Mozambique)

Religion
- Christianity, Shona traditional religion (Chivanhu) (Mwari), Islam (minority)

Related ethnic groups
- Kalanga; Venda; Nambya; Tsonga

- Person: MuShona
- People: Mashona
- Language: chiShona
- Country: Mashonaland

The Shona people (/ˈʃoʊnə/), sometimes historically referred to as the Karanga, (Note: The term Karanga began as an exonym of the Shona used by outsiders, however in the modern day it refers to a dialect of Shona in south-central Zimbabwe.) are a Bantu ethnic group native to Southern Africa, primarily living in Zimbabwe where they form the majority of the population, as well as Mozambique, South Africa, and worldwide diaspora. There are six major Shona language/dialect clusters: Manyika, Karanga, Zezuru, Korekore, Kalanga, and Ndau. The Shona make up at least 70% of Zimbabwe's population, with the Ndebele forming the largest minority (20%). They speak the Shona language, called chiShona. They migrated from the Congo River basin towards the end of the first millennium and settled in the present day Zimbabwe, where they established a civilization.

== Classification ==
The Shona people are an ethnic group comprising several related language and dialect groups. Their estimated population is 22.6 million:

- Korekore (northern region of Zimbabwe)
- Zezuru (central Zimbabwe)
- Manyika (eastern Zimbabwe around Mutare, Buhera, Nyanga and into Mozambique)
- Ndau (southeast Zimbabwe around Mutare, Chimanimani, Chipinge and into Mozambique)
- Karanga (south-central Zimbabwe around Masvingo)
- Kalanga (southwest Zimbabwe, interspersed with the Ndebele)

== History ==
During the 11th century, the Karanga people formed kingdoms on the Zimbabwe plateau. Construction, then, began on Great Zimbabwe; the capital of the kingdom of Zimbabwe. The Torwa dynasty ruled the kingdom of Butua, and the kingdom of Mutapa preceded the Rozvi Empire (which lasted into the 19th century).

Brother succeeded brother in the dynasties, leading to civil wars which were exploited by the Portuguese during the 16th century. The kings ruled several chiefs, sub-chiefs and headmen.

The kingdoms were replaced by new groups who moved onto the plateau. The Ndebele destroyed the weakened Rozvi Empire during the 1830s; the Portuguese gradually encroached on the kingdom of Mutapa, which extended to the Mozambique coast after it provided valued exports (particularly gold) for Swahili, Arab and East Asian traders. The Pioneer Column of the British South Africa Company established the colony of Rhodesia, sparking the First Matabele War which led to the complete annexation of Mashonaland; the Portuguese colonial government in Mozambique fought the remnants of the kingdom of Mutapa until 1911. The Shona people were also a part of the Bantu migration where they are one of the largest Bantu ethnic groups in Sub-Saharan Africa.

In the 1960s, a large number of Shona people migrated to Kenya as missionaries. In 2021, their descendants have been recognized as one of Kenya's official ethnic tribes.

== Economics ==
=== Agriculture ===
The Shona have traditionally practiced subsistence agriculture. They grew sorghum, beans, African groundnuts, and after the Columbian Exchange, pumpkins. Sorghum was largely replaced by maize after the crop's introduction. The Shona also keep cattle and goats, since livestock are an important food reserve during droughts.

=== Mining ===
Precolonial Shona states derived substantial revenue from the export of mining products, particularly gold and copper.

== Culture ==
=== Clothing ===
Traditional clothing was usually animal skins that covered the front and the back, and was called 'Mhapa' and 'Shashiko'. These later evolved when the Shona people started trading for cloth with other groups, such as the Tsonga, and native cloths began to be manufactured.

=== Music ===
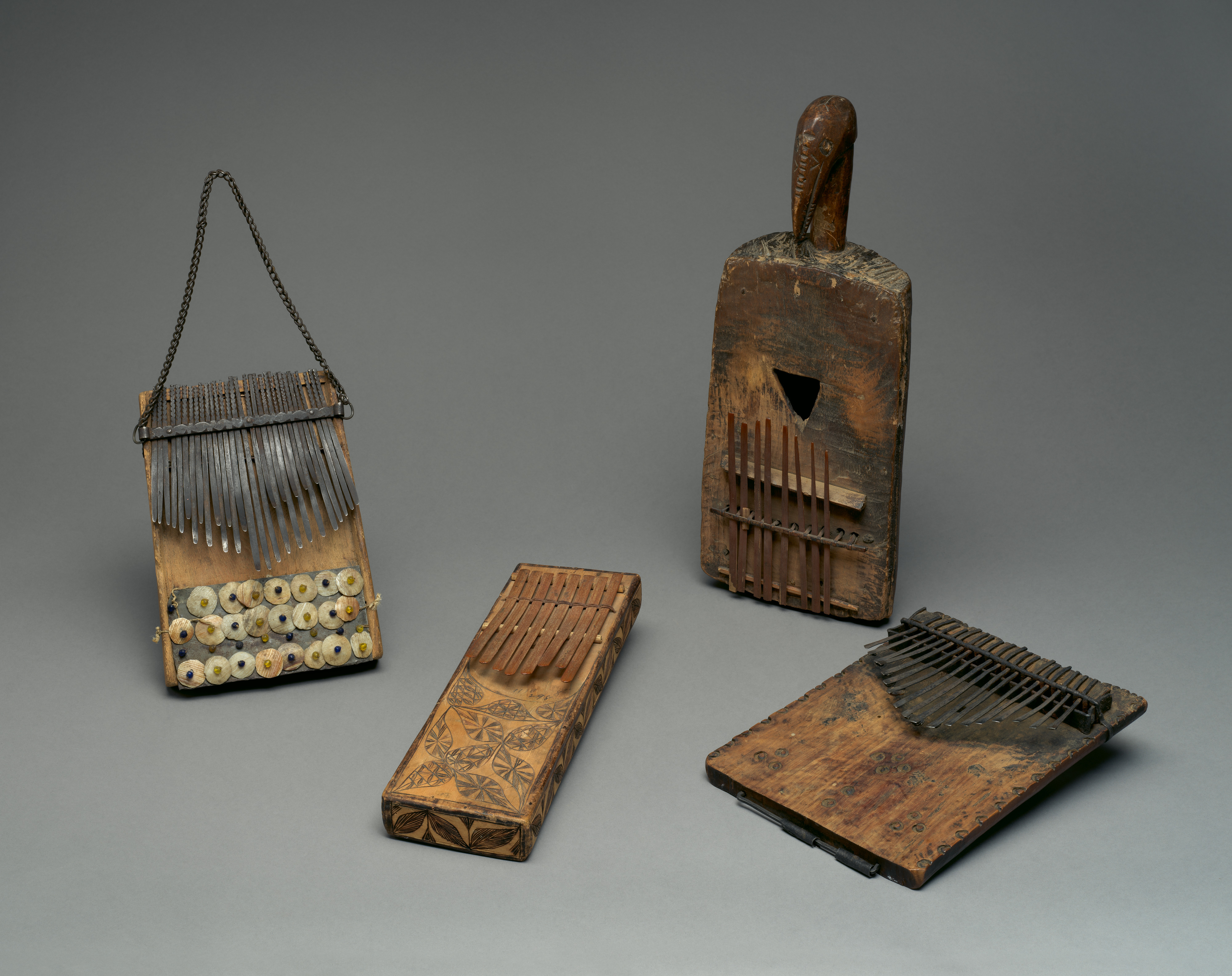
Mbiras

Shona traditional music's most important instruments are Ngoma drums and the Mbira. The drums vary in size and shape, depending on the type of music they are accompanying. How they are played also depends on drum size and music type. Large drums are typically played with sticks, and smaller drums with an open palm; the small drum used for the Amabhiza dance is played with a hand and a stick. The stick rubs, or scratches, the drum to produce a screeching sound.

The mbira has become a national instrument of sorts in Zimbabwe. It has several variants, including the Nhare, Mbira Dzavadzimu, the Mbira Nyunga Nyunga, Njari Mbira, and Matepe. The Mbira is played at religious and secular gatherings, and different Mbiras have different purposes. The 22–24-key Mbira Dzavadzimu is used to summon spirits, and the 15-key Mbira Nyunga Nyunga is taught from primary school to university. Shona music also uses percussion instruments such as the Marimba (similar to a Xylophone), shakers ('Hosho'), leg rattles, wooden clappers ('Makwa'), and the 'Chikorodzi,' a notched stick played with another stick.

=== Arts ===
Both historically and in contemporary art, the Shona are known for their work in stone sculpture, which re-emerged during the 1940s. Shona sculpture developed during the eleventh century and peaked in the thirteenth and fourteenth centuries, before beginning a slow decline until their mid-20th-century rediscovery. Most of the sculptures are made from sedimentary stone (such as Soapstone) and depict birds or humans; though some are made with harder stone such as serpentinite. During the 1950s, Zimbabwean artists began carving stone sculptures for sale to European art collectors; these sculptures quickly became popular and were bought and exhibited at art museums around the world. Many of the sculptures depict the transformation of spirits into animals or vice versa, and some are more abstract. Many Zimbabwean artists carve wood and stone to sell to tourists.

Pottery is also a traditionally practiced craft, with the storage and serving pots being the most decorative, contrasted with those used for cooking. In Shona clay earthenware pots are known as Hari.

=== Architecture ===
Traditional Shona housing (Musha) are round huts arranged around a cleared yard (Ruvanze). Each hut has a specific function, such as acting as a kitchen or a lounge. Also, Shona architecture consists of drystone walling that goes back to the ancestors of modern-day Shona people and also Kalanga and Venda peoples. This drystone walling consists of drystone walls, drystone walled stairs on hilltops and free-standing drystone walls known as great Zimbabwe-type drystone walling (examples: Great Zimbabwe, Chisvingo). Then there are additional types of drystone walling that the Shona people did in Rozvi state that is platform terraces drystone walling. In the eastern province of Zimbabwe there is ziwa-type drystone walling with cattle crawls for an indigenous African species of cattle that still exists today and underground homes with drystone walled verandas.

=== Cuisine ===
Sorghum and maize are used to prepare the staple dish, a thickened porridge (Sadza), and the traditional beer known as Hwahwa. Beef is a staple in Shona people's diet due to cattle rearing being very prominent in Zimbabwe. Historically, the wealthy royals would be able to eat beef on a regular (more than three times a week), usually dried; and commoners would eat beef at least once a week, also dried. Cattle was a prized resource, normally reserved for other products like milk. Preserved milk was consumed with Sadza, at the time made by Sorghum. At present, beef is consumed normally mixed with greens, Kale being the most commonly used.

=== Religion ===
==== Shona religion ====
The traditional religion of the Shona people is centred on Mwari (God), also known as Musikavanhu (Creator of man/people) or Nyadenga (one who lives high up). God communicates with his people on earth directly or through chosen family members in each family believed to be holy. At times God uses natural phenomena and the environment to communicate with his people. Some of the chosen people have powers to prophesy, heal and bless. People can also communicate with God directly through prayer. Deaths are not losses but a promotion to the stage where they can represent the living through the clan spirits. When someone dies, according to the Shona religion, they join the spiritual world. In the spiritual world, they can enjoy their afterlife or become bad spirits. No one wants to be a bad spirit, so during life, people are guided by a culture of Unhu so that when they die, they enjoy their afterlife. The Bira ceremony, which often lasts all night, summons spirits for guidance and intercession. Shona religion teaches that the only ones who can communicate with both the living and God are the ancestral spirits or Dzavadzimu.

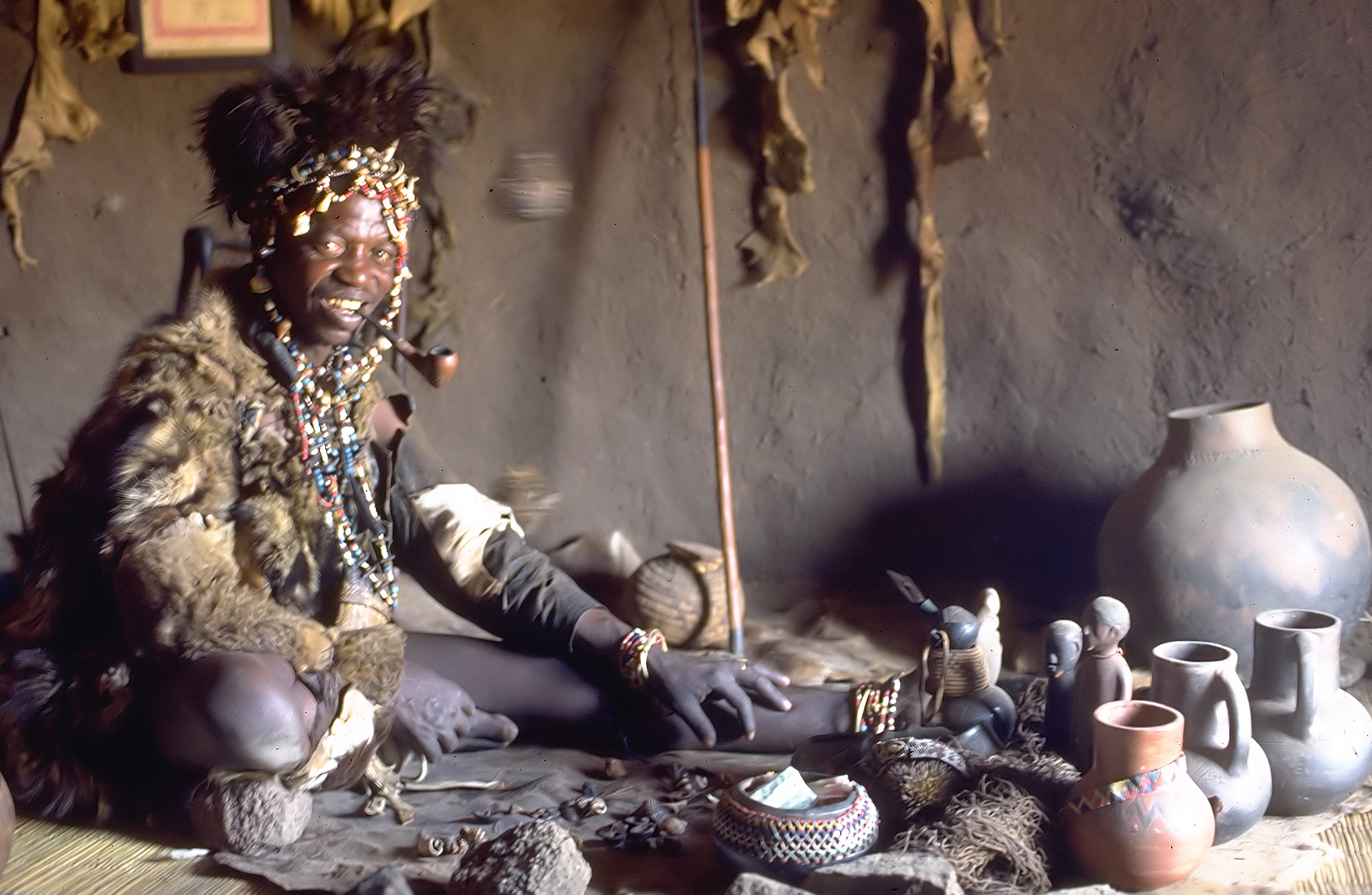
A n'anga, close to Great Zimbabwe

During the colonial period, some colonial administrators and anthropologists promoted Christianity among the Shona population. Initially, they stated that Shona did not have a God. They denigrated the way the Shona had communicated with their God Mwari, the Shona way of worship, and chosen people among the Shona. The chosen people were treated as unholy and Shona prayer was labelled as pagan. When compared with Christianity, the Shona religious perspective of afterlife, holiness, worship and rules of life (unhu) are similar.

==== Religious affiliation of Shona peoples ====
Although sixty to eighty percent of the Shona people follow Christianity, Shona traditional religious beliefs are still present across the country. A small number of the population practice the Muslim faith, often brought about by immigrants from predominantly Malawi who practice Islam. There is also a small population of Jews.

=== Mitupo identity emblems ===
In Zimbabwe, the Mitupo (translated as totems by colonial missionaries and anthropologists, a term which neglects the organizational system) is a system of identifying clans and sub-clans, which are named after and signified by emblems, commonly Indigenous animals or animal body parts. Mitupo (the plural of Mutupo singular) has been used by the Shona people since the Shona culture developed. They have provided a function in avoiding incest, and also build solidarity and identity. They could be compared to heraldry in European culture. There are more than 25 Mitupo in Zimbabwe. In marriage, Mitupo helps create a strong identity for children but it serves another function of ensuring that people marry someone they know. In Shona, this is explained by the proverb Rooranai Vematongo which means 'marry or have a relationship with someone that you know'. However, as a result of colonisation, urban areas and migration resulted in people mixing and others having relationships of convenience with people they do not know. This results in unwanted pregnancies and also unwanted babies some of whom are dumped or abandoned. This may end up with children without Mutupo. This phenomenon has resulted in numerous challenges for communities but also for the children who lack part of their identity. It is, however, possible for a child to be adopted and receive a mutupo.

=== Sexuality ===
In precolonial Shona culture, homosexual people were left alone, because people feared that the ngozi, avenging spirit, of the person would go after them if the homosexual was punished.

== Notable Shona people ==
- Alick Macheso
- Benjani Mwaruwari
- Ovidy Karuru
- Nehanda Charwe Nyakasikana
- Robert Mugabe
- Herbert Chitepo
- Constantino Chiwenga
- Stella Chiweshe
- Chartwell Dutiro
- Tonderai Kasu
- Thomas Mapfumo
- Malachi Napa
- Strive Masiyiwa
- Paul Tangi Mhova Mkondo
- Emmerson Mnangagwa
- Tendai Mtawarira
- Oliver Mtukudzi
- Grace Mugabe
- Joice Mujuru
- Solomon Mujuru
- Knowledge Musona
- Solomon Mutswairo
- Jah Prayzah
- George Tawengwa
- Rekayi Tangwena
- Tendayi Darikwa
- Morgan Tsvangirai
- Vitalis Zvinavashe
- Kotaro Matsushima
- Andy Rinomhota
- Dambudzo Marechera
- Talbert Shumba
- Shingai Shoniwa
- Leslie Borerwe
