= Mbira =

African musical instrument of the lamellophone family

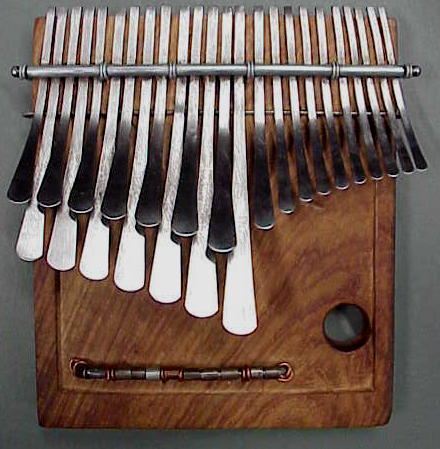
- Mbira Dza Vadzimu ("Voice of the Ancestors")

Other instrument
- Other names: finger harp, gourd piano, ikembe, kalimba, kilembe, likembe, likimba, marimbula, mbla, sansa, sansu, sanza, thumb piano, timbrh, zanzu, finger piano
- Classification: Lamellophone, Plucked Idiophone
- Hornbostel–Sachs classification: 122.1 (Plucked idiophone)
- Timbre: clear, percussive, chimelike
- Volume: low
- Attack: fast
- Decay: moderate

Playing range
- Varies, see Tuning low to medium

Art of crafting and playing Mbira/Sansi, the finger-plucking traditional musical instrument in Malawi and Zimbabwe
- UNESCO Intangible Cultural Heritage
- Country: Malawi and Zimbabwe
- Reference: 01541
- Region: Africa

Inscription history
- Inscription: 2020 (15th session)
- List: Representative

Mbira (/əmˈbɪərə/ əm-BEER-ə; Shona pronunciation: [ᵐbira]), also known as kalimba and zanza (or variant spellings), are a family of musical instruments, traditional to the Shona people of Zimbabwe.

The instruments consist of a wooden board (often fitted with a resonator) with attached staggered metal tines, played by holding the instrument in the hands and plucking the tines with the thumbs and/or fingers. Musicologists classify it as a lamellaphone, part of the plucked idiophone family of musical instruments.

In Eastern and Southern Africa, there are many kinds of mbira, often accompanied by the hosho, a percussion instrument. It is often an important instrument played at religious ceremonies, weddings, and other social gatherings. The "Art of crafting and playing Mbira/Sansi, the finger-plucking traditional musical instrument in Malawi and Zimbabwe" was added to the UNESCO Representative List of the Intangible Cultural Heritage of Humanity in 2020.

The kalimba was commercially produced and exported by the ethnomusicologist Hugh Tracey in the late 1950s, popularizing similar instruments outside of Africa. Tracey's design was modelled after the mbira nyunga nyunga and named kalimba after an ancient predecessor of the mbira family of instruments. It was popularized in the 1960s and early 1970s largely by such musicians as Maurice White of the band Earth, Wind and Fire and Thomas Mapfumo. These musicians included mbira on stage accompanying modern rock instruments such as electric guitar and bass, drum kit, and horns. Their arrangements included numerous songs directly drawn from traditional mbira repertoire. Other notable influencers bringing mbira music out of Africa are Dumisani Maraire, who brought marimba and karimba music to the American Pacific Northwest; Ephat Mujuru, who was one of the pioneer teachers of mbira dzavadzimu in the United States; and the writings and recordings of Zimbabwean musicians made by Paul Berliner. It is common for the instruments to be called kalimbas in western countries.

Joseph H. Howard and Babatunde Olatunji have both suggested the mbira (and other metal lamellaphones) are thoroughly African, being found only in areas populated by Africans or their descendants. Similar instruments are reported to have been used in Okpuje, a village in Nsukka, in southeastern Nigeria, in the early 1900s.

== History ==
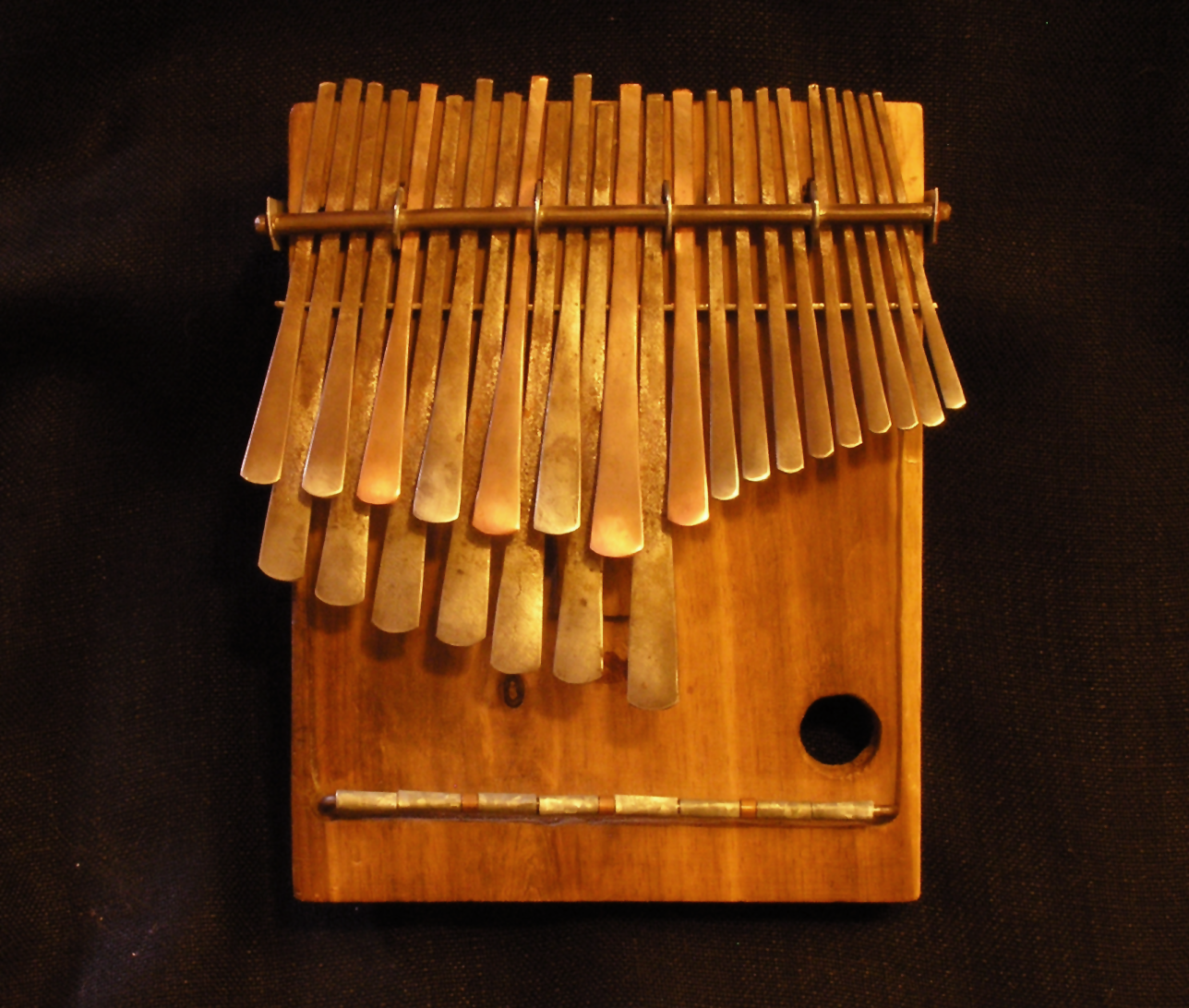
A Zimbabwean mbira dza vadzimu

Various kinds of plucked idiophones and lamellaphones have existed in Africa for thousands of years. The tines were originally made of bamboo but over the years metal keys have been developed. These types of instrument appear to have been invented twice in Africa: a wood or bamboo-tined instrument appeared on the west coast of Africa about 3,000 years ago, and metal-tined lamellophones appeared in the Zambezi River valley around 1,300 years ago. Metal-tined instruments traveled all across the continent, becoming popular among the Shona of Zimbabwe (from which the word mbira comes) and other indigenous groups in Zimbabwe and Mozambique. The mbira was differentiated in its physical form and social uses as it spread. Kalimba-like instruments came to exist from the northern reaches of North Africa to the southern extent of the Kalahari Desert, and from the east coast to the west coast, though many or most groups of people in Africa did not possess mbiras. There were thousands of different tunings, different note layouts, and different instrument designs, but there is a hypothetical tuning and note layout of the original metal-tined instrument from 1,300 years ago, referred to as the 'kalimba core'.

In the mid 1950s mbira instruments were the basis for the development of the kalimba, a westernised version designed and marketed by the ethnomusicologist Hugh Tracey, leading to a great expansion of its distribution outside Africa.

== Acoustics ==
Lamellophones are instruments which have little tines, or "lamellae", which are played by plucking. Unlike stringed instruments or air-column instruments like flutes, the overtones of a plucked lamella are inharmonic, giving the mbira a characteristic sound. The inharmonic overtones are strongest in the attack and die out rather quickly, leaving an almost pure tone. When a tine is plucked, the adjacent tines also create secondary vibrations that increase the harmonic complexity of an individual note.

== Rhythm ==
Mbira music, like much of the sub-Saharan African music traditions is based on cross-rhythm. An example from the kutsinhira part of the traditional mbira dzavadzimu piece "Nhema Musasa" is given by David Peñalosa, who observes that the left hand plays the ostinato "bass line," while the right hand plays the upper melody. The composite melody is an embellishment of the 3:2 cross-rhythm (also known as a hemiola).

== Tuning ==
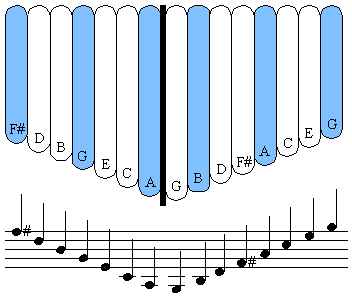
Tuning chart for the Tracey 15-note alto kalimba (treble key missing).

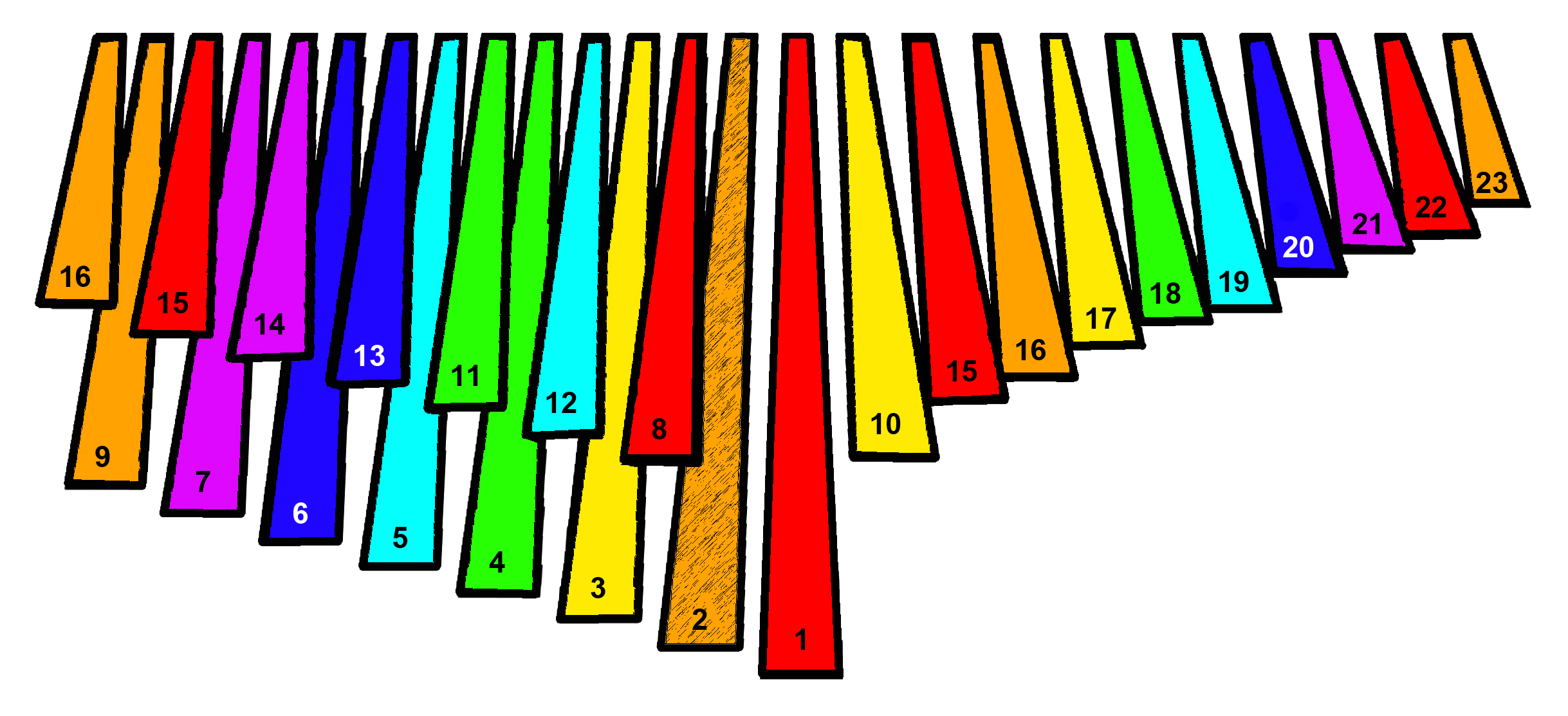
mbira dzavadzimu tuning and key layout * Same color keys are the same notes (usually octaves) * Key “1” is the lowest note, ascending to the highest note key “23” * Key “2” is often only found on the mavembe tuning * Some mbira have extra keys (e.g. extra “17” on left side, or higher notes on the right beyond key “23” are most common) * Note intervals can vary, but all the octaves are divided into a heptatonic scale, many being diatonic or at least nearly diatonic * This diagram does not represent every mbira dzavadzimu, but does represent the most common layout * The key numbering and color codes portrayed here are arbitrary and simply to communicate the layout (not traditional approach)

It is common on African mbira and other lamellophones to have the lowest notes in the centre with higher notes to the far left and the far right—this is an ergonomic nicety, in that the thumb can pivot such that all the tines are easy to reach. However, traditional African tunings use notes that do not lie on the grid of the Western tempered scale, and traditional mbira note layouts are often idiosyncratic, sometimes with adjacent tines making part of a scale, but then an odd note thrown in that defies the pattern.

Historically, mbira tunings have not mapped exactly onto Western scales; it is not unusual for a seven-note sequence on a mbira to be "stretched" over a greater range of frequencies than a Western octave and for the intervals between notes to be different from those in a Western scale. Tunings have often been idiosyncratic with variations over time and from one player to another. A mbira key produces a rich complex of overtones that varies from one instrument to another depending on its maker's intentions and accidents of fabrication, such that some instruments simply sound better when some notes of a familiar tuning are pushed. With the increased popularity of the mbira dzavadzimu in North America, Europe, and Japan in recent decades, Zimbabwean mbira makers have tended to tune their instruments more uniformly for export, but much variation is still found among mbira in their homeland.

Tunings vary from family to family, referring to relative interval relationships and not to absolute pitches. The most common tuning played throughout Zimbabwe and among non-Zimbabwean mbira players worldwide is Nyamaropa, similar to the western Mixolydian mode. Names may also vary between different families; Garikayi Tirikoti has developed a "mbira orchestra" that has seven different tunings, each starting on a different interval of the same seven-note scale, where it is possible to play all instruments in a single performance. The seven tunings that Garikayi uses are: Bangidza, Nyabango, Nhemamusasa, Chakwi, Taireva, Mahororo, and Mavembe (all of which are also names of traditional songs save for Mavembe and Nyabango). The closest to what is commonly named "Nyamaropa" is his "Nhemamusasa" tuning.

=== Specific tunings ===
Common names for tunings are:

- Nyamaropa (close to Mixolydian mode) (considered the oldest and most representative in Shona culture) It emphasizes togetherness through music, creating polyrhythms through having two Mbira players at once, having singing styles accompany an Mbira such as Huro (High emotional notes that are at the top of a singer's range) & Mahon'era (a soft breathy voice at the bottom of the singer's range) or both elements. A single Mbira is considered incomplete for a performance.
- Dambatsoko (close to Ionian mode), played by the Mujuru family. The name refers to their ancestral burial grounds.
- Dongonda, usually a Nyamaropa tuned mbira with the right side notes the same octave as the left (an octave lower than usual).
- Katsanzaira (close to Dorian mode), the highest pitch of the traditional mbira tunings. The name means "the gentle rain before the storm hits".
- Mavembe (also: Gandanga) (close to Phrygian mode), Sekuru Gora claims to have invented this tuning at a funeral ceremony. The mourners were singing a familiar song with an unfamiliar melody and he went outside the hut and tuned his mbira to match the vocal lines. Other mbira players dispute that he invented it.
- Nemakonde (close to Phrygian mode), same musical relationship as the mavembe, but the nemakonde tuning is a very low pitched version.
- Saungweme (flattened whole tone, approaching seven tone equal temperament).

== Variants ==
=== Mbira dzavadzimu ===
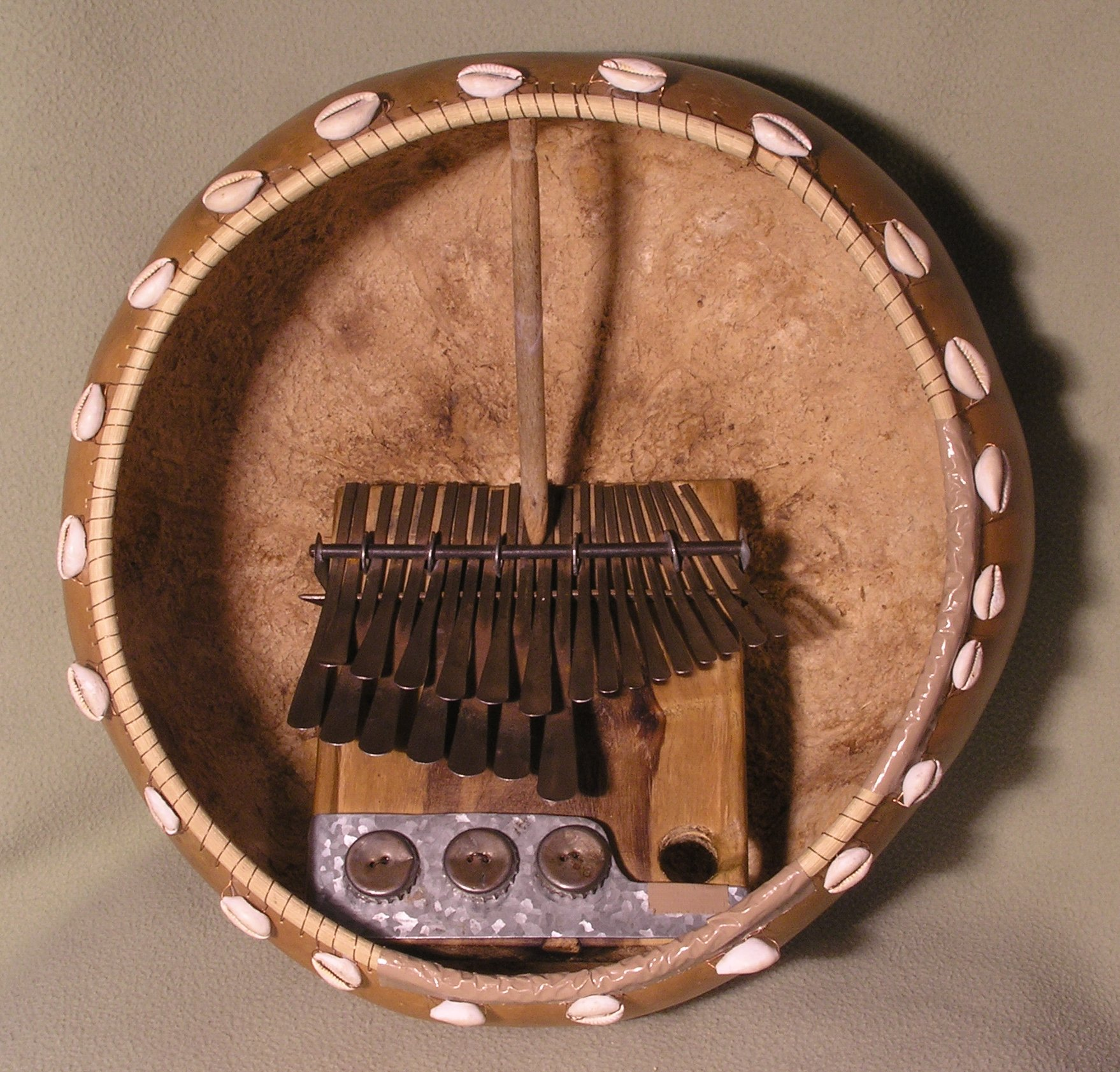
Mbira dzavadzimu in a deze

In Shona music, the mbira dzavadzimu ("voice of the ancestors", or "mbira of the ancestral spirits", national instrument of Zimbabwe) is a musical instrument that has been played by the Shona people of Zimbabwe for thousands of years. The mbira dzavadzimu is frequently played at religious ceremonies and social gatherings called mapira (sing. "bira"). The mbira dzavadzimu can be used to play over one hundred songs, such as Kariga mombe.

A typical mbira dzavadzimu consists of between 22 and 28 keys constructed from hot- or cold-forged metal affixed to a hardwood soundboard (gwariva) in three different registers—two on the left, one on the right.

While playing, the little finger of the right hand is placed through a hole in the bottom right corner of the soundboard, with the little finger entering from the front of sound board, and the ring finger and middle finger reaching around the back to stabilise the instrument. This leaves the thumb and index finger of the right hand open to stroke the keys in the right register from above (thumb) and below (index finger). The fingers of the left hand stabilise the left side of the instrument, with most fingers reaching slightly behind the instrument. Both registers on the left side of the instrument are played with the left thumb. Some mbira possess an extra key in the upper left register which is hit from below by the left index finger.

Bottle caps, shells, or other objects ("machachara") are often affixed to the soundboard to create a buzzing sound when the instrument is played. In a traditional setting, this sound is considered extremely important, as it is believed to attract ancestral spirits.

During a public performance, an mbira dzavadzimu is frequently placed in a deze (calabash resonator) to amplify its sound.

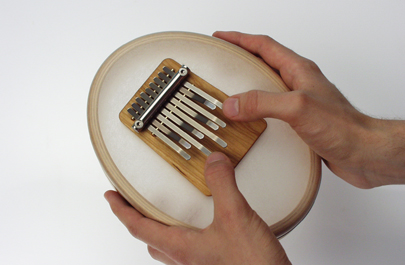
A sansula, a recent interpretation of the mbira that has the instrument suspended on a drum-like membrane in a surrounding frame.

The mbira dza vadzimu is very significant in Shona religion and culture, considered a sacred instrument by the Shona people. It is usually played to facilitate communication with ancestral spirits, bringing the spirit of the dead back on its homestead. Within the Shona tradition, the mbira may be played with paired performers in which the kushaura, the caller, leads the performed piece as the kutsinhira, the responder, "interlocks" a subsequent part. The ritual is known as the Bira. During these all-night ceremonies, people call upon the spirits to answer questions. The variations of notes in an Mbira piece aid the participants in going into trance, which in Shona culture aids the spirits in taking over the participant's body.

Albert Chimedza, director of the Mbira Centre in Harare, has estimated that "there are at most ten thousand people in the world who play mbira."

=== Mbira Nyunga Nyunga ===
The nyunga nyunga which normally has 15 keys, originated from Manicaland where it traditionally played the entertainment role during social gatherings and commemorations. Jeke (Jack) Tapera introduced the mbira nyunga nyunga in the 1960s from Tete province of Mozambique to Kwanongoma College of African music (now United College of Music) in Bulawayo. Two keys were then added to make fifteen (Chirimumimba, 2007), in two rows. The mbira nyunga nyunga is similar in construction to the mbira dzavadzimu, but has no hole in the soundboard. Key pitch radiates out from the center, rather than from left to right.

Zimbabwe's Dumisani Maraire originated mbira nyunga nyunga number notation. The upper row keys (from left) are keys 2, 4, 6, 8, 10, 12, and 14 while the bottom row keys are notated as 1, 3, 5, 7, 9, 11, 13, and 15. Maraire brought awareness of this instrument to the United States when he came to the University of Washington as a visiting artist from 1968 to 1972.

Recently a Midlands State University (Gweru, Zimbabwe) lecturer in the department of music and musicology has suggested a letter notation; the upper keys as (from first left upper key) E, D, C, F, C, D, and E and the lower or bottom keys as (from the first lower key) A, G, F, A, F, C, D, and E. But the Maraire number notation has remained the internationally accepted system (Chirimumimba, 2007).

Dutch composer Maarten Regtien (1963) uses a Mbira Nyunga Nyunga in the electronic composition Daddy Mbira - Mbira Penguin Talks (2014), creating soundscapes and using western composition techniques like the canon, impossible to play on a mbira.

=== Njari mbira ===
Njari mbira has 30 to 32 keys and was also originated from Zimbabwe particularly Masvingo and Makonde.

=== Nhare ===
The nhare has 23 to 24 keys and was originated from Zimbabwe. In the Zimbabwean tradition, nhare was used for rituals of communicating with Musikavanhu or Nyadenga (God).

=== Mbira matepe ===
A Zimbabwean matepe

Mbira matepe which has 26 keys originated from along the borders of Zimbabwe and Mozambique.

=== Outside Africa ===
==== In the diaspora ====
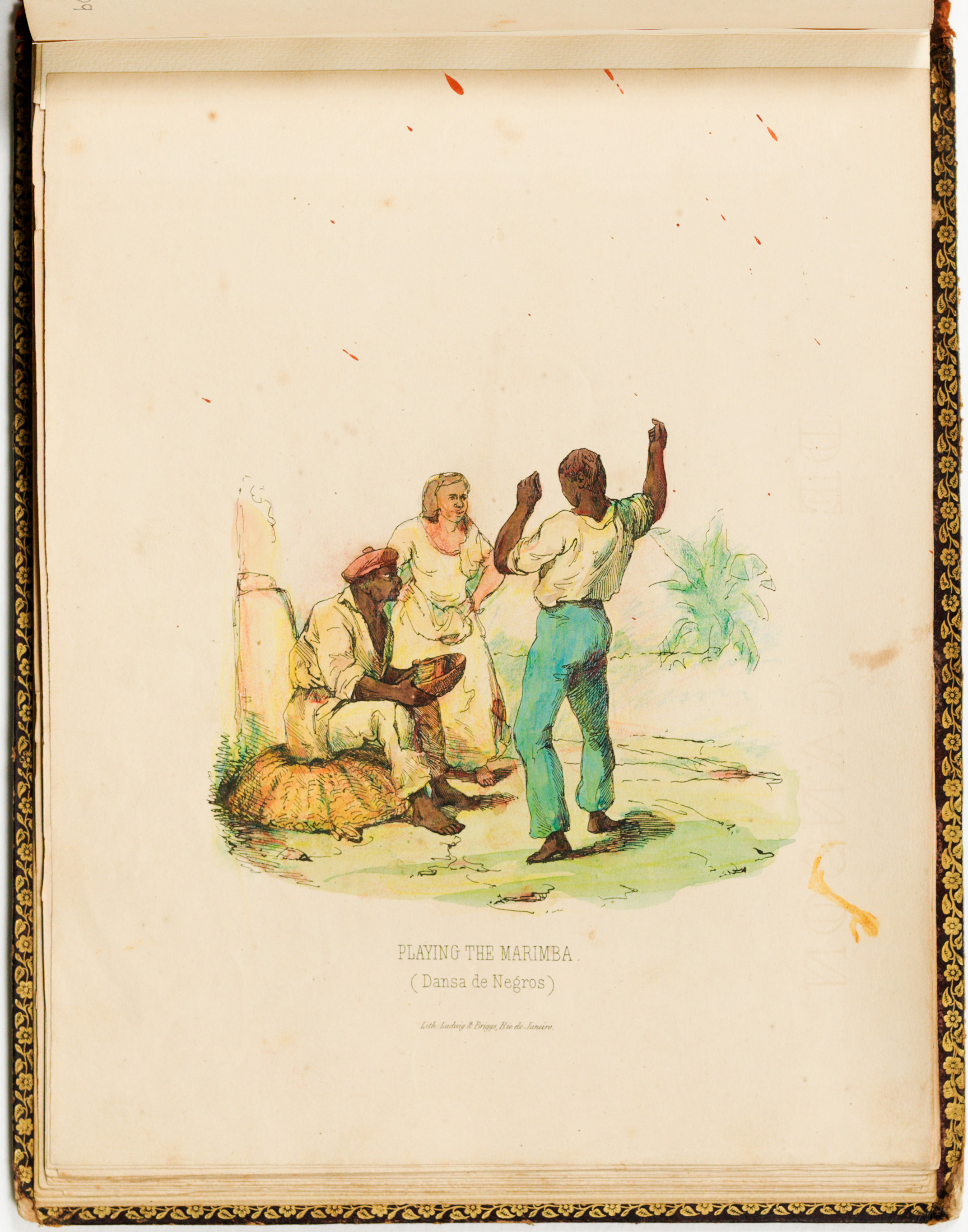
A Kalimba player in Brazil by Eduard Hildebrandt (1846)

The first documentation of Kalimbas in Brazil dates back to 1723 where they are referred to as marimbas (not to be confused with marimbas). They seem to have faded into obscurity as they did not make it to the present day, although "modern" Kalimbas now exist in Brazil.

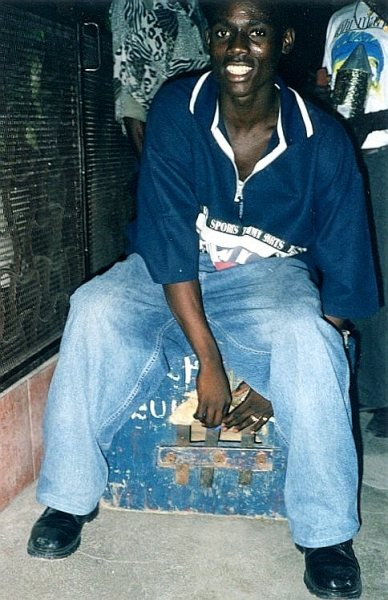
An example of a Marimbula in Haiti

In Cuba African lamellophones along with the Cajón influenced the origins of the marimbula, whose history is poorly documented but is suspected to have originated in eastern Cuba.

==== Hugh Tracey ====
The Hugh Tracey kalimbas are tuned diatonically in the key of G. The arrangement of the notes on the Hugh Tracey kalimba borrows from the typical scheme with the lowest notes in the center and the upper notes on the left and the right, with the notes in the ascending scale alternating strictly right-left and going outwards towards the two sides.

The diatonic western kalimba tuning which Tracey used was practical for a worldwide instrument—with hundreds of African kalimba tunings, the chosen Western standard would maximise the number of people who would immediately connect with the kalimba. The practicality of this note arrangement, with notes going up the scale in a right-left-right-left progression, is that modal 1-3-5 or 1-3-5-7 chords are made by playing adjacent tines. If chords are played in the lower octave, the same notes will appear on the opposite side of the kalimba in the upper octave, which makes it very easy to simultaneously play a melody in the upper octave and an accompanying harmony in the lower octave. So, the arrangement of notes on the Hugh Tracey kalimba (and on virtually any kalimba that copies the instrument) makes certain complex musical operations very simple.

Alternative tunings are possible, as the tines of most kalimbas are easily pushed in and out to sharpen or flatten their pitch. Some alternative tunings simply change the key of the kalimba, without changing the note layout scheme. C major is a popular tuning, sold by multiple manufacturers. Other alternative tunings move the kalimba to non-modal scales (such as Middle-Eastern scales). Each note of the kalimba can be tuned independently (unlike a guitar), so any scale, western or non-western, is possible, and traditional African scales are still accessible to this modern African instrument. Composer Georg Hajdu has tuned the Hugh Tracey alto kalimba to the chromatic steps of the Bohlen–Pierce scale in a piece called Just Her – Jester – Gesture. The Bohlen–Pierce scale subdivides the just twelfth into 13 steps.

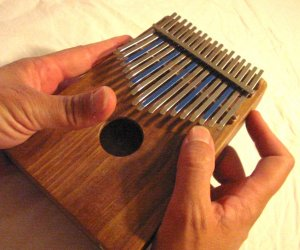
Hugh Tracey treble kalimba

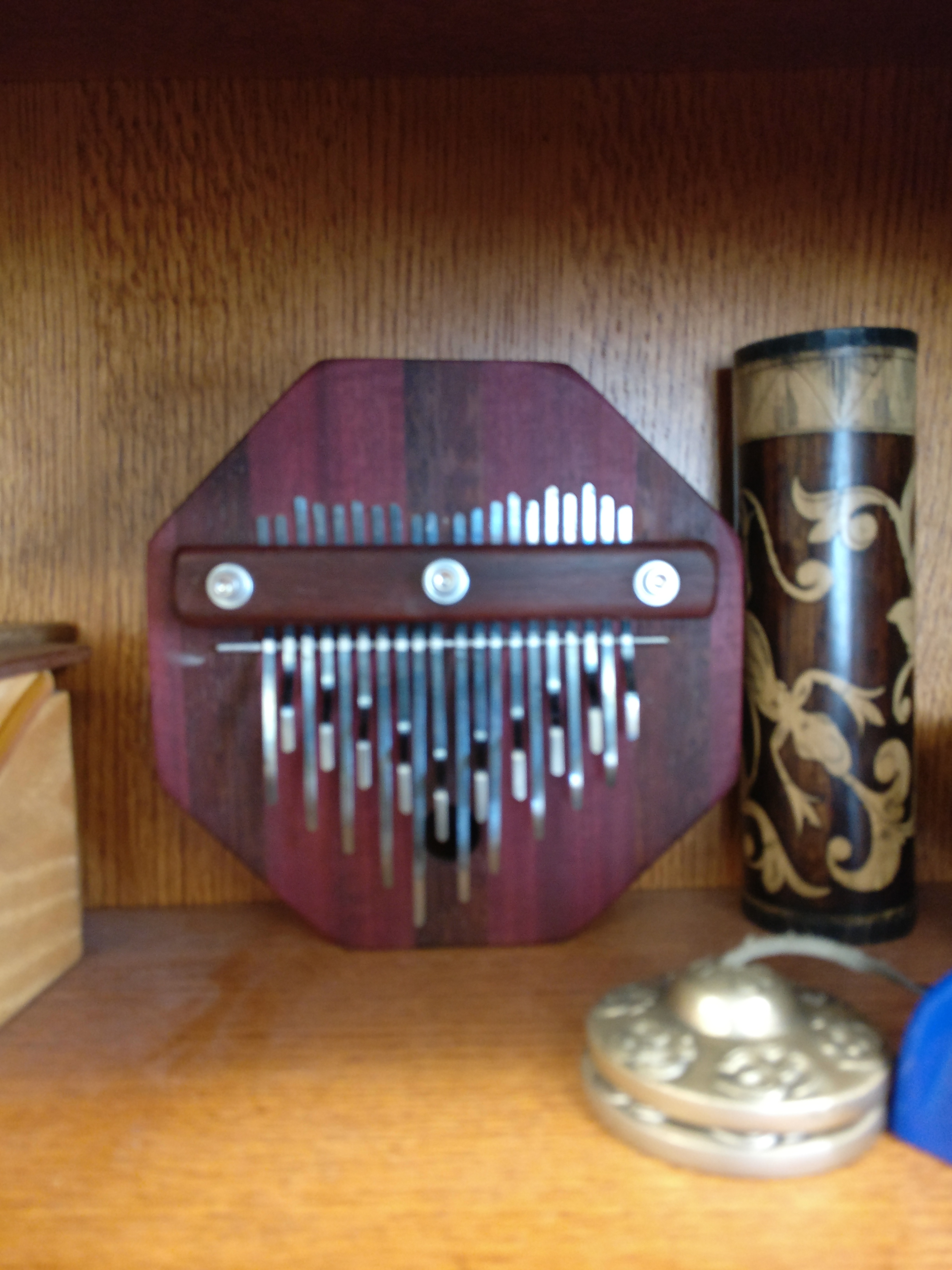
An octagonal mbira of high craftsmanship which spans two octaves.

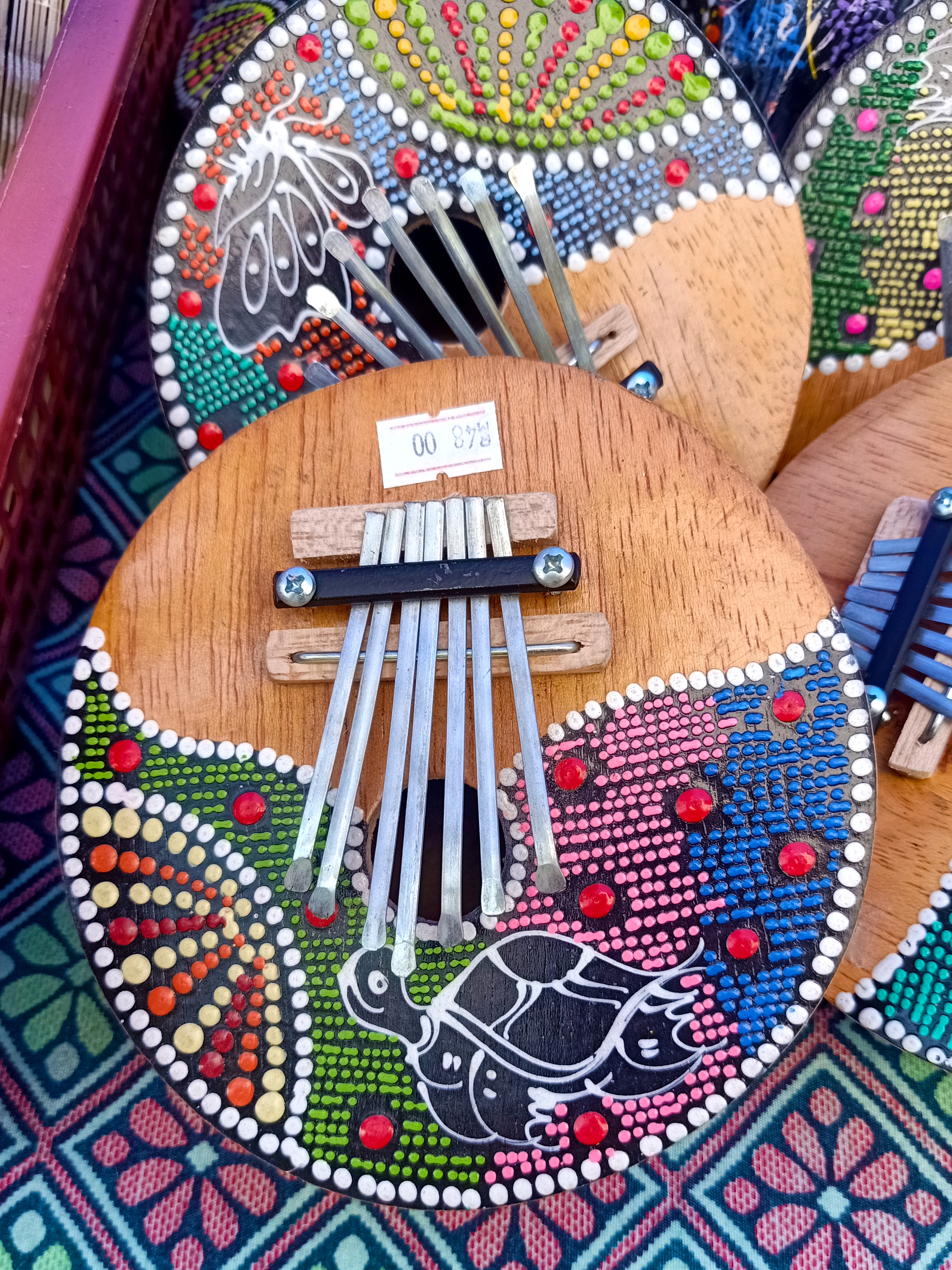
Gaya Street Sunday Market, Kota Kinabalu

=== Related instruments ===
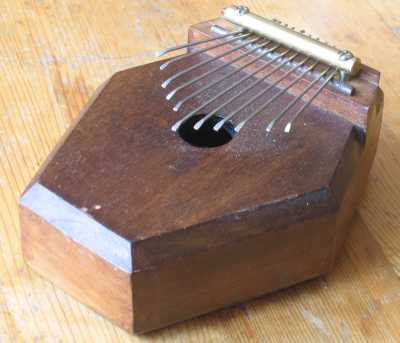
Sanza

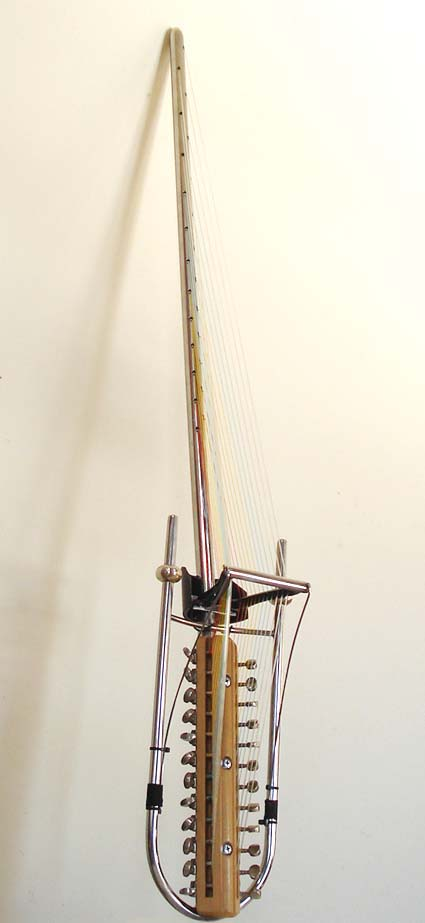
Signature Series Gravikord

Instruments related to or inspired by the mbira include:

- Array mbira, a modern invention consisting of as many as 150 tines configured in a special order based on the circle of fifths (see Isomorphic keyboard).
- Gravikord, an electrified double harp that is a modern kora and kalimba hybrid, inspired by the cross rhythms of the mbira. The Gravikord was invented in 1986 by Bob Grawi, an American musician and artist. It is also tuned in the key of G major/E minor in an extended version of the Hugh Tracey kalimba tone layout with a range of 3 1/2 octaves. Music and playing techniques learned on this kalimba can be easily transferred and played on the Gravikord.
- Guitaret, an electric lamellophone made by Hohner and invented by Ernst Zacharias, in 1963.
- Ikembe, an instrument common among the Hutu of Rwanda, Burundi, and eastern DR Congo.
- Modern kalimba, the mbira inspired instruments of Hugh Tracey. Named after the original kalimba (ancestor of mbira).
- Kisanji among Ngala-speaking people of western DR Congo and eastern Congo Republic.
- Thoom Otieno (also tom, thom or toom), popular in Gambela Region, in Western Ethiopia on the border of South Sudan.
- Marímbula (also Marimból), a bass instrument used in the Caribbean and Mexico.

== In popular culture ==
Despite its Botswanan setting, the 1980 movie The Gods Must Be Crazy features a character playing the mbira.

In the 2010 video game Donkey Kong Country Returns, one of main antagonists of the game is named Krazy Kalimba. Being a member of the musical instrument-themed Tiki Tak Tribe, his design features a "crown" evoking the keys of a kalimba, and he plays kalimba music as part of his hypnotic chant used to make various animals do his bidding.

On May 21, 2020, as part of Zimbabwe Culture Week, Google honoured the mbira with a doodle which included a button allowing users to hear and play the instrument virtually. The doodle also featured the animated story of a young girl who learns to play the mbira, later inspiring a new generation of mbira players after becoming an established artiste herself as an adult.

In Paramount's Animated series, Avatar: Seven Havens, one of the main characters, Pavi, plays a Kalimba to accompany a lullaby she remembers her mother singing.

== See also ==
- Electric lamellophone
- Gravikord
- Music of Africa
- Polyrhythm
- Xylophone

== General and cited references ==
- Berliner, Paul (c. 1978). The Soul of Mbira: Music and Traditions of the Shona People of Zimbabwe. Berkeley: University of California Press.
- Fowler, Andy (2020) Discover Mbira : Ancient Zimbabwean Trance Music. Mbira Magic.
- Fowler, Andy (2015) Unlocking Mbira : Chord Progression and System of Mbira Workbook. Mbira Magic.
- Gahadzikwa, Fungai; Fowler, Andy (2016) Traditional Mbira Song Book. Mbira Magic.
- Howard, Joseph H. (1967). Drums in the Americas. New York City: Oak Publications.
- Kwenda, Forward; Fowler, Andy (2019) Learn to Play Mbira : Traditional Songs and Improvisation. Mbira Magic.
- Mutwa, Credo Vusa'mazulu (1969). My people: the incredible writings of Credo Vusa'mazulu Mutwa. Johannesburg: Blue Crane Books.
- Tracey, Andrew (1970). "The Matepe Mbira Music of Rhodesia" (PDF). African Music. 4 (4): 37–61. doi:10.21504/amj.v4i4.1681. (Note: this article is the original source of the Matepe song Siti, as played by Zimbabwean Marimba band Musango.)
- Tracey, Hugh (1961). The evolution of African music and its function in the present day. Johannesburg: Institute for the Study of Man in Africa.
- Tracey, Hugh (1969). "The Mbira class of African Instruments in Rhodesia (1932)". African Music. 4 (3): 78–95. doi:10.21504/amj.v4i3.1439.
- Warner Dietz, Betty; Olatunji, Michael Babatunde (1965). Musical Instruments of Africa; Their Nature, Use, and Place in the Life of a Deeply Musical People. New York City: John Day Company.
