= Hugh Tracey =

English ethnomusicologist (1903–1977)

Hugh Travers Tracey
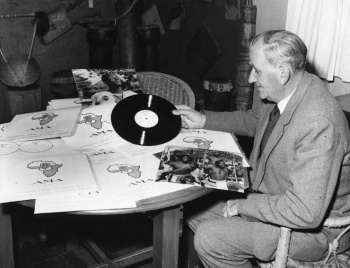
- Hugh Tracey in South Africa, 1960.
- Born: 29 January 1903; Willand, Devon, England
- Died: 23 October 1977 (aged 74); Krugersdorp, South Africa
- Organization: International Library of African Music
- Known for: Kalimba

Hugh Travers Tracey (29 January 1903 – 23 October 1977) was a British ethnomusicologist. He and his wife collected and archived music from Southern and Central Africa. From the 1920s through the 1970s, Tracey made over 35,000 recordings of African folk music. He popularized the mbira (a musical instrument of the Shona people) internationally under the name kalimba.

Hugh Tracey saw the importance of music within culture when he worked a tobacco farm in Southern Rhodesia. Here, he experienced music that displayed beliefs and morals, which inspired him to make his field recordings. He wanted to stop the loss of traditional music and culture from modernity and recorded all of his field recordings from rural areas that still held onto traditional culture and ideas.

== Life and career ==
Tracey was born in Willand, Devon, in 1903. In the late 1920s Tracey was a farmer in rural Devon, when he decided to travel to Southern Rhodesia, current Zimbabwe. There he continued to work as a farmer, but became deeply interested in the local music. In 1934, he left farming to work in the South African Broadcasting Corporation. In 1947, he established the African Music Society in Roodepoort, South Africa.

=== Kalimba ===
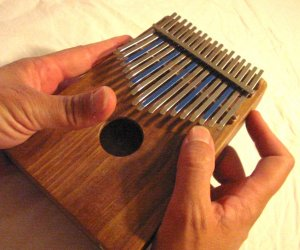
A Hugh Tracey treble kalimba.

The kalimba is most similar to the mbira nyunga nyunga, but varies substantially from the more popular mbira dzavadzimu which is a fundamentally different instrument. Tracey was interested in the mbira, the national instrument of Zimbabwe, which has been part of the music of the Shona people for hundreds of years. In his efforts to spread awareness of Africa's vast musical heritage, he created an adaptation of the mbira known as the kalimba. The kalimba, which literally translates as "little music", was designed so that it could be learned and appreciated internationally. Today, kalimbas continue to be handcrafted in a family run workshop in Grahamstown, South Africa. They come in several different models: the treble and celeste treble (17 notes, 2+ octaves), the alto and TM alto (15 notes, 2 octaves), 11-note pentatonic kalimba, the African-tuned karimba, and an 8-note beginner's kalimba.

=== International Library of African Music ===
In 1954, Tracey founded the International Library of African Music (ILAM) and became its director. ILAM publishes the African Music Society Journal. As part of the ILAM, Tracey made over 35,000 recording of African folk music during multiple recording tours throughout Africa. Notable tours include:

- 1957 – Zambezi Valley (Valley Tonga tribe) recording tour
- 1958 – Nyasaland recording tour
- 1958 – Swaziland recording tour
- 1959 – Western Transvaal and Bechuanaland recording tour
- 1959 – Basutoland recording tour

Hugh's sons, Andrew and Paul, also became well known ethnomusicologists and musicians specializing in African music. Andrew took over ILAM as director following his father's death. Paul and his wife Barbara composed several songs for the Muppet Show.

=== Death ===
Tracey died on 23 October 1977 and is buried at the Saronde Valley Farm, near Krugersdorp, South Africa.

== Recordings ==
Tracey's recording were published in 210 LPs by the International Library of African Music. Although commercially available, his Music of Africa series (also known as the Sound of Africa series) can be mostly found in University libraries. Many of his recordings were also issued by other record labels such as Decca, London, Gallo, and SWP Records, and have been made available on CD and digitally. He also edited the Wild Life series, which encompasses animal recordings made in Africa.

== Publications ==
- The Evolution of African Music and its Function in the Present Day, Johannesburg: Institute for the Study of Man in Africa, 1961a
- "The Mbira class of African Instruments in Rhodesia (1932)". African Music. 4 (3): 78–95. 1969. doi:10.21504/amj.v4i3.1439.
- Chopi musicians: their music, poetry, and instruments. London: Oxford University Press. 1970 [1948]. (Note: Describes the Timbila of Mozambique)
- African music research: transcription library of gramophone records : handbook for librarians. Gallo (Africa). 1961.
- "Towards an Assessment of African Scales". African Music. 2 (1): 15–20. 1958. doi:10.21504/amj.v2i1.522. JSTOR 30249468.
- "A Case for the Name Mbira". African Music. 2 (4): 17–25. 1961b. doi:10.21504/amj.v2i4.703. JSTOR 30249527.
- "The state of folk music in Bantu Africa". African Music. 1 (1): 8–11. 1954. doi:10.21504/amj.v1i1.219.
- "The future of music in Basutoland". African Music. 2 (2): 10–14. 1954. doi:10.21504/amj.v2i2.582.
- "The International Library of African Music". African Music. 1 (1): 71–73. 1954. doi:10.21504/amj.v1i1.232.
- "Recording African music in the field". African Music. 1 (2): 8–11. 1955. doi:10.21504/amj.v1i2.250.

== See also ==
- Music of Africa
- Chemirocha – Tracey's field recordings in Kenya
- George Sibanda - Africa's first popular music star, recorded by Tracey
