= Paul Berliner (ethnomusicologist) =

American ethnomusicologist (born 1946)

Paul Franklin Berliner (born 1946) is an American ethnomusicologist, best known for specializing in African music as well as jazz and other improvisational systems. He is best known for his popular ethnomusicology book on the Zimbabwean mbira, The Soul of Mbira: Music and Traditions of the Shona People of Zimbabwe, for which he received the ASCAP Deems Taylor Award. He also published Thinking in Jazz: The Infinite Art of Improvisation for which he received The Society of Ethnomusicology's Alan Merriam Prize for Outstanding Book in Musicology. Berliner received his Ph.D. from Wesleyan University.

Paul is the oldest of three and was born in Cambridge, MA to Joe and Ann Berliner.

Berliner is Professor of Ethnomusicology at the John Hope Franklin Center for International and Interdisciplinary Studies at Duke University. He formerly taught at the School of Music of Northwestern University. He has recorded and produced albums of Shona mbira music, and has been recorded as a performer with the Paul Winter Consort. In 1979 he released an album of jazz played on the kudu horn, "The Sun Rises Late Here" (Flying Fish FF092). He was elected a Fellow of the American Academy of Arts and Sciences in 2004.

== Publications ==
- The Soul of Mbira: Music and Traditions of the Shona People of Zimbabwe. Berkeley : University of California Press, 1978. ISBN 9780226043791.
- Thinking in Jazz: The Infinite Art of Improvisation Chicago: University of Chicago Press, 1994. ISBN 9780226043814.
- The Art of Mbira: Musical Inheritance and Legacy Chicago: University of Chicago Press, 2019. ISBN 9780226628684.
- Mbira’s Restless Dance: An Archive of Improvisation Chicago: University of Chicago Press, 2020. ISBN 9780226626277.
