= Hosho (instrument) =

Zimbabwean musical instrument

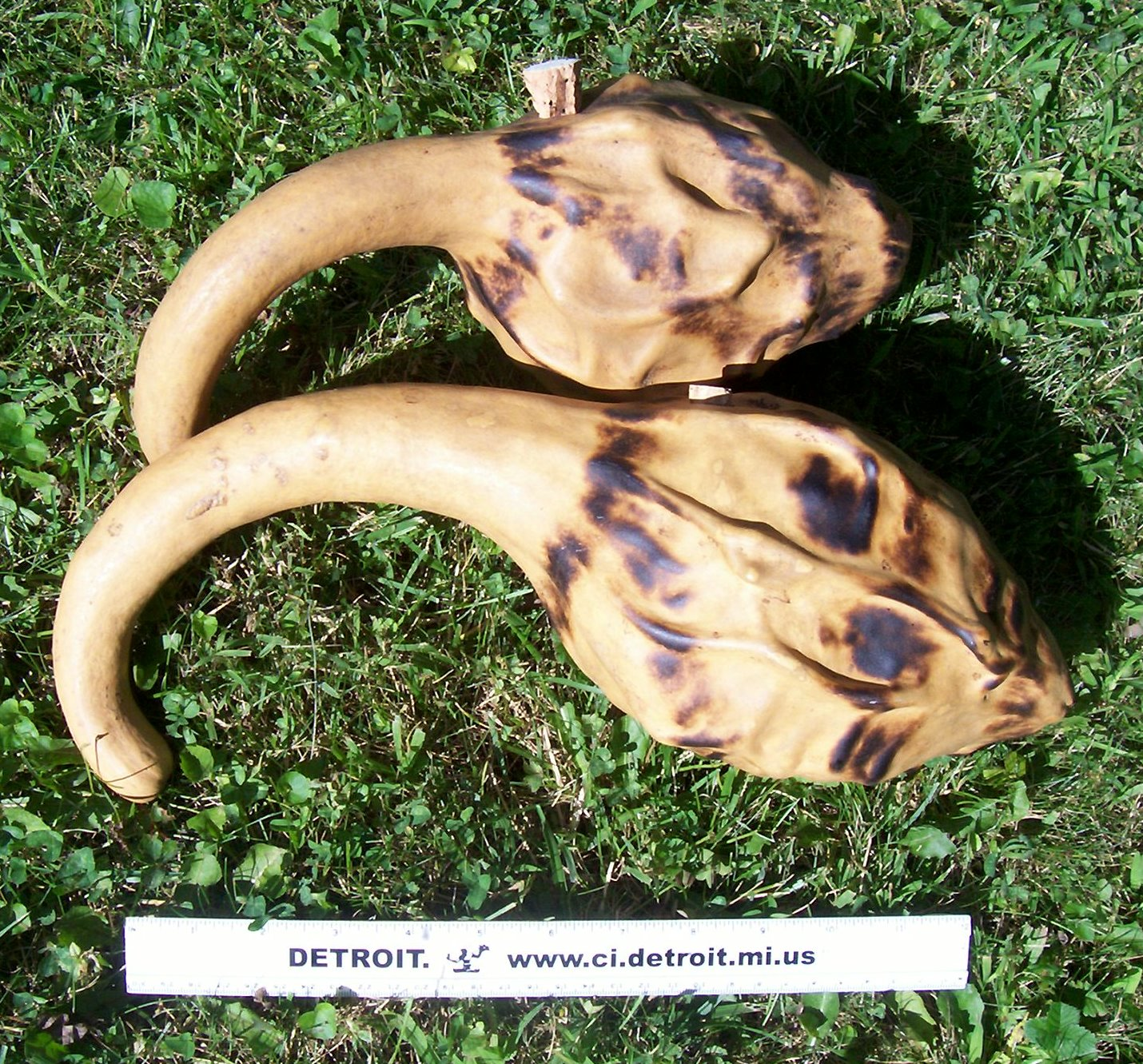
A pair of hosho.

The hosho are Zimbabwean musical instruments consisting of a pair of maranka (mapudzi) gourds with seeds. They are used as major instruments in many traditional Shona music genres, such as in mbira ensembles and in mhande. They typically contain hota (Canna indica) seeds inside them. Before the hota seeds are added, the hosho is boiled in salted water and the inside is scraped out with a corncob, newspaper plug, or woven wire. Removing the debris inside the hosho allows for a more sharp and percussive tone.

The hosho are used to accompany Shona music, especially mbira music. Hosho plays several key roles in Zimbabwean music. Oliver Mtukudzi insists that it’s what keeps musicians on the same page. Hosho doesn't add thickness to mbira performance all due to its dense sound quality. It is also a good start in learning Mbira. This is because it helps beginners to observe patterns and learn from mbira masters by looking over their shoulders. Moreover, hosho has acted as a way for women to join mbira performance.

Hosho make a rattling sound that western ears may be unaccustomed to hearing. However, this accompaniment is essential when playing mbira and/or marimba music. So essential, in fact, that extra vibrating elements such as mirlitons (buzzing membranes made from spider webs) are attached to the resonating tubes of marimbas and machachara (miniature Hosho made from seashells or bottle caps) are attached to the mbira and its deze. Mbiras and marimbas from Africa; and even other instruments, such as drums, will have some kind of rattles associated with their use.

Many hosho styles emphasize the second pulse of the triplet. This creates an off beat articulation that follows the bass notes of the mbira's kutsihnira part.

From a western perspective the hosho are seen as accompanying instruments to mbira, when in actuality they are seen as the lead instruments by the mbira players. Hosho goes well too with Makwa. Makwa clapping is a very common aspect of musical practices but very often underlooked or rather not discussed as much. Whistling is one other feature that’s usually distinctive, common but rarely talked about. Makwa plays significant roles in Zimbabwe Ngoma and mbira ensembles. It adds that sharpness that’s usually heard over other instruments. This adds that the timbral element to many musical forms giving room for alterations hence more musical creations

A smaller version of the hosho is made of a wild orange called a damba, tied together with sticks and filled with hota seeds or pebbles.

Other related percussion instruments from Zimbabwe include the magavhu (leg rattle) and ngoma (drum).

One of Zimbabwes most respected Hosho players is Tendai Kazuru from Mbira deNharira.

== See also ==
- Mbira
- Shona music
- Music of Africa
- Music of Zimbabwe
- Zimbabwe
