= Andrew Tracey =

South African ethnomusicologist (1936–2024)

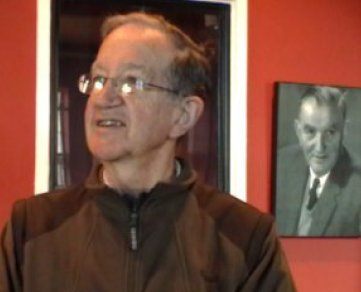

Background information
- Born: 5 May 1936; Durban, South Africa
- Died: 2024
- Occupations: Ethnomusicologist, musician, composer, educator

Andrew Tracey (5 May 1936 – 2024) was a South African ethnomusicologist, musician, composer, and educator, widely known for his pioneering research on African musical instruments, particularly the mbira and karimba, and for his advocacy of applied ethnomusicology. He served as director of the International Library of African Music (ILAM) from 1977 until 2005 and was influential in the global understanding of African music systems.

== Early life and education ==
Tracey was born in Durban, South Africa, the eldest son of the ethnomusicologist Hugh Tracey and Ursula Campbell. His early exposure to African music began in childhood through his father’s broadcasting work and field recordings. Following his parents' divorce, he moved to England at age ten, where he continued his education, later attending Charterhouse School.

After completing national service in Kenya, during which he learned Swahili and encountered East African musical traditions, Tracey enrolled at Oxford University. Initially studying languages, he switched to Social Anthropology, drawn to the study of African societies and music.

== Career ==
=== Wait a Minim! ===
In the late 1950s, Tracey and his brother Paul co-created The Nutcrackers, a musical comedy radio programme. This evolved into the revue Wait a Minim!, which combined folk and protest songs with satire and social commentary. The show debuted in Johannesburg in 1962 and achieved international success with long runs in London's West End, on Broadway, and in Australia.

=== Ethnomusicology and ILAM ===
After his touring career, Tracey joined ILAM, the research centre founded by his father, where he focused on instrument documentation and African music transcription. Tracey’s research on lamellophones, particularly the mbira and karimba, was groundbreaking in identifying historical lineages between instruments across southern Africa. His proposal that the karimba represented a core "ancestral" mbira layout influenced instrument makers, ethnomusicologists, and educators alike.

Upon his father’s death in 1977, Tracey became director, a position he held until 2005. Here he facilitated the relocation of the institution from Roodepoort to Rhodes University in Makhanda. The move was instrumental in ensuring ILAM's long-term survival and expanded its role as a centre for African music research and pedagogy in South Africa.

One of Tracey’s most enduring contributions during his tenure was the establishment of the annual Symposium on Ethnomusicology in 1980. The symposium created a vital platform for the presentation and discussion of African music research, especially during a time when formal opportunities for scholarly exchange on African musical traditions were limited within South Africa.

The initial meeting, hosted at Rhodes University, featured five speakers and around thirty attendees, including students. Over time, the symposium evolved into a significant fixture on the South African academic calendar, nurturing a community of ethnomusicologists and advancing the institutional growth of African music studies in southern Africa.

Tracey also served as the editor of the symposium proceedings, published by ILAM, which provided an important source of African music studies scholarship for both students and academics.

Through the symposia and his broader stewardship of ILAM, Tracey helped create institutional pathways for African music pedagogy, contributing to the eventual establishment of ethnomusicology positions in South African universities. His work also included securing resources for the digitisation of field recordings, expanding ILAM's sound archive, and mentoring emerging scholars in the discipline.

=== African musical instruments and pedagogy ===
In addition to his academic work, Tracey played a key role at African Musical Instruments (AMI), a family-founded company that manufactured marimbas, kalimbas, and mbiras for educational and recreational use worldwide.

Tracey was also an advocate for the practical teaching of African music in schools and universities, championing experiential and embodied learning. He founded the Ethnomusicology Symposium at ILAM in 1980, creating a collaborative platform for researchers across the continent.

== Publications and legacy ==
Tracey published extensively on African music, especially on the technical and social aspects of musical instruments, including marimba, mbira, timbila xylophones, nyanga pan pipes, and valimba. His articles are notable for their clear transcriptions, visual illustrations, and sensitivity to indigenous knowledge systems.

His influence extended beyond his publications, shaping generations of scholars and musicians through his commitment to applied ethnomusicology and African music pedagogy at Rhodes University and beyond.

== Personal life ==
Tracey met his wife Heather in London during the Wait a Minim! tour, and they remained married until his death. He lived for many years in Grahamstown (now Makhanda), South Africa, where he continued his teaching and research.

== Death ==
Andrew Tracey died in 2024. His legacy is preserved through his writings, recordings, and his lasting impact on African music studies.

== Selected publications ==
- Tracey, Andrew. "The Original African Mbira?" African Music, vol. 5, no. 2, 1972, pp. 85–104.
- Tracey, Andrew. "The System of the Mbira." African Music, vol. 6, no. 3, 1982, pp. 37–61.
- Tracey, Andrew. "The Evolution of African Lamellophones." African Music, vol. 8, no. 3, 1992, pp. 85–113.
