= Chimurenga (disambiguation) =

Chimurenga is a word in the Shona language meaning "revolutionary struggle" or uprising.

"Chimurenga" may also refer to:

== Culture ==
- Chimurenga music, a Zimbabwean popular music genre
- Chimurenga (magazine), a publication of arts, culture, and politics from and about Africa and its diasporas

== Wars ==
- First Chimurenga, an 1896–1897 war fought by the Matabele and Shona people against the British South Africa Company
- Second Chimurenga, a 1967–1979 war fought between the White minority-led government of Rhodesia, the Zimbabwe African National Liberation Army, and the Zimbabwe African People's Union.

== Other uses ==
- Third Chimurenga, sometimes used to refer to the land reform program undertaken by the Zimbabwe government since 2000
