= Rise Up =

Rise Up may refer to:

== Film and television ==
- Rise Up (film), a 2007 Jamaican documentary
- "Rise Up" (Grey's Anatomy), a 2008 TV episode
- "Rise Up" (The Purge), a 2018 TV episode

== Music ==
=== Albums ===
- Rise Up (Art of Dying album) or the title song, 2015
- Rise Up! (Bobby Conn album) or the title song, 1998
- Rise Up (Cain album) or the title song (see below), 2020
- Rise Up (Cliff Richard album) or the title song, 2018
- Rise Up (Cypress Hill album) or the title song (see below), 2010
- Rise Up (Peter Frampton album) or the title song, 1980
- Rise Up (Saliva album) or the title song, 2014
- Rise Up (Thomas Mapfumo album), 2005
- Rise Up (Yves Larock album) or the title song (see below), 2008
- Rise Up (Colors of Peace), a compilation of songs composed for the writings of Fethullah Gülen, 2013
- Rise Up, by Alan Steward, 2018
- Rise Up, by Bobby Kimball, 1994
- Rise Up, by Daniel Band, 1986
- Rise Up!, by Dr. Lonnie Smith, 2008
- Rise Up, an EP by NiziU, or the title song, 2024

=== Songs ===
- "Rise Up" (Andra Day song), 2015
- "Rise Up" (Cypress Hill song), 2010
- "Rise Up" (Freaky Fortune song), represented Greece at the Eurovision Song Contest 2014
- "Rise Up" (Parachute Club song), 1983
- "Rise Up" (Yves Larock song), 2007
- "Rise Up (Lazarus)", by Cain, 2020
- "Rise Up", by Beyoncé from the Epic film soundtrack, 2013
- "Rise Up", by Die Krupps from Paradise Now, 1997
- "Rise Up", by Drama, 2023
- "Rise Up," by Drowning Pool, 2004
- "Rise Up", by Ghastly from The Mystifying Oracle, 2018
- "Rise Up", by Imagine Dragons from Evolve, 2017
- "Rise Up", by Pennywise from From the Ashes, 2003
- "Rise Up", by R. Kelly from Double Up, 2007
- "Rise Up", by Skillet from Victorious, 2019
- "Rise Up", by Skunk Anansie from Paranoid & Sunburnt, 1995
- "Rise Up", by Sum 41 from Heaven :x: Hell, 2023
- "Rise Up", by Testament from Dark Roots of Earth, 2012
- "Rise Up", by Thomas Jack, 2016
- "Rise Up", by Vanessa Amorosi from Turn to Me, 2001

== Other uses ==
- Rise Up (conference), an annual conference hosted by Catholic Christian Outreach
- Riseup, a volunteer-run collective providing secure online services
