= Hallelujah Chicken Run Band =

Zimbabwean band

- Origin: Zimbabwe
- Genres: Chimurenga music
- Years active: 1974–1979

Hallelujah Chicken Run Band was a Zimbabwean band formed in Mhangura, then-Rhodesia in the 1970s. The band was an early pioneer of a style of music called chimurenga, from the Shona word for “struggle.”

== History ==
The band was founded by trumpet player Daram Katanga in order to perform for workers at Mhangura copper mine. They initially started playing the more common Afro-Rock styles of the period, but gained an increased following when they shifted their sound to include electric arrangements with traditional Shona music.

In 1974 they won a national music competition organized by the South African label Teal that would solidify their growing popularity.

The sound they pioneered would eventually be called Chimurenga and was adopted by other bands of the 70s and 80s. Singer Thomas Mapfumo had a successful solo career in the 80s and would go on to bring Chimurenga around the world.

== Members ==
Past members

- Thomas Mapfumo – vocals
- Daram Karanga – trumpet
- Robson Boora – saxophone
- Joshua Hlomayi Dube – guitar
- Wilson Jubane – guitar
- Abdulah Musa – guitar
- Patrick Kabanda – drums
- Robert Nekati – bass

== Discography ==
=== Singles & EPs ===
- Alikulila / Mazhlamini (7") (1974, Afro Soul)
- Muroridodo / Hodi (7") (1974, Afro Soul)
- Ngoma Yarira / Murembo (7") (1974, Afro Soul)
- Shumba Inobva Mu Gomo / Amalume (7") (1977, Shungu)
- Manhanga / Chinyi Chatakatadza (7") (1980, Star Black)
- Mukadzi Wangu Ndomuda / Sekai (7") (Afro Pop)
- Tinokumbira Kuziva / Ngatiende Kumusha (7") (Afro Pop)
- Chakanyuka / Sara Anochema (7") (Shungu)
- Midzimu Yedu / Tave Muzimbabwe (7")

=== Compilations ===
- Take One (2006, Analog Africa)

== See also ==
- Afropop
- Chimurenga
- Music of Zimbabwe
- Chimurenga music
