= Shed Studios =

- Origin: Zimbabwe
- Years active: 1975–2000
- Labels: Shed (Zimbabwe); Rugare (Zimbabwe); Stanyan (South Africa); Discafrique; Mango/Island/PolyGram Records
- Past members: Stephen Roskilly; Martin A Norris; Neil Thain; Steve Hughes; Bothwell Nyamhondera; David Scobie; Henry Peters; Peter VanDeventer; Benny Miller; Bud Cockcroft; Kelly Rusike; Peter Muparutsa; Andrew McClymont

Shed Studios was responsible for the production of hundreds of band recordings and a large body of music used for various advertisements and films in Rhodesia, and later in Zimbabwe, from 1975 until 2000. The company "Shed Recording Studios (Pvt) Ltd" (now defunct) began in 1975, as a collaboration between Steve Roskilly, Martin Norris and Neil Thain, all employees of Rhodesia Television.

== The beginning ==
Initially housed in a converted caravan, the first studio was based on a half inch 8 track Itam 805 tape recorder and series 2 Soundcraft 12:4:2 mixer, mastering onto a Revox A77 Reel to Reel tape recorder. This outfit learned its trade by making a series of live recordings at various music venues around Salisbury, the capital City, but soon found that the uniqueness of the mobile caravan, became more of a restriction than an advantage and a proper studio was seen as essential for progress.

== Advertising jingles ==
Both Norris and Roskilly were, by now, working full time for Blackberry Productions, a young radio and TV production facility. Blackberry offered the use of their largest studio for a small rental and so the Shed equipment was set up there and the company started making advertising jingles, children's story records, and a few private band recordings. Jingle productions were not new to Rhodesia, but there was a need for more complex multi-tracked productions, and Norris & Roskilly were quick to respond. After the Blackberry day-job, advertising work was handled late into the evenings. Neil Thain had pulled out fairly early on, moving to Johannesburg and as the volume of advertising work increased, the number of hours available in the evenings soon became insufficient. Mounting pressure for even more studio time by 1979 resulted in the company leasing 380 sq m on the top floor of Park House, Park Street and the business moved into a self-built, professional studio premises. Studio 1 was a comparatively large studio, comprising 6m x 6m Tom Hidley styled control room and 12m x 8m live room, with floating floored drum booth. These were difficult times personally, as Martin Norris had to fulfil his army call-up duties every 6 weeks. This left Roskilly alone in the studio to carry on the business as he had a 5-year exemption from callup, having only recently arrived in the country from the UK.

The new studio's first recordings were for the folk singer and advertising Creative Director Clem Tholet. Tholet's album Songs of Love and War was a chronicle of his early life. Tholet became a good friend of the studios and brought a significant body of his Ad Agency – Matthewman, Banks and Tholet's advertising work to it in the following years, as well as numerous privately produced songs, albums and film tracks. But the other ad agencies soon started bringing their work to the studios too, and some classic pieces were written and recorded by Roskilly and Norris.

Whilst Norris played guitar, bass guitar and sang vocals, Roskilly played keyboards and wrote arrangements for orchestral instruments. A small number of regular session players evolved. Ace drummer, Bothwell Nyamhondera was offered a full time position as resident drummer and trainee engineer. A second studio was built, and Nyamhondera was encouraged to find deserving artists when not actually in the studios playing drums. These were probably the most adventurous years for jingles and would be rewarded in 1982, when Shed Studios was presented with the coveted Advertising Association of Zimbabwe 'Premier Award'.

Norris wrote a jingle for the travel agency – Musgrove and Watson, as commissioned by Nick Alexander, a copywriter for Matthewman, Banks and Tholet, but sadly had to leave for yet another call-up stint. Roskilly was left to do the arrangement and production work, and asked David Scobie, a 15-year-old with a very mature Neil Diamond sound-alike voice, to sing the lead part. It was a great combination of efforts and the jingle went on to win an award for best jingle at the following AAZ Awards, and started a relationship with the young singer that lasted many years.

Another great friend of the studio was the Zimbabwean guitarist Louis Mhlanga. He was a regular visitor to the studios, adding guitar parts to advertising works, and as session musician on a variety of albums. His last major work under his own name was the album 'Mukai' and with Jethro Shasha 'Musik Ye Africa', before he moved to South Africa, where his career blossomed.

== Shed Record Label ==
The "Shed" record label was also launched in 1980, offering free studio production time to deserving artists in return for a percentage of any resultant incomes. A publishing company Shed Music (Pvt) Ltd was created to deal with the music rights. Success resided predominantly in two artists, David Scobie, as mentioned before and The Bhundu Boys, though many others including The Rusike Brothers, The Great Witch, and The Real Sounds became household names. Vinyl was pressed and CDs replicated in Zimbabwe under licence to Gramma Records.

Norris wrote a song called "Gypsey Girl" for Scobie to record. The released single shot straight up the record sales charts knocking Michael Jackson's "Thriller" off the coveted No 1 position. It was in the charts for 25 weeks, 9 of which were at No 1 position. Subsequently, it peaked at No 5 in the South African charts, remaining for 19 weeks. Scobie starred in two South African TV shows on SATV as a result but despite further singles and several albums, his career didn't take off any further. When he left school, however, he joined Shed Studios as a trainee engineer, ultimately becoming a director some years later, and finally leaving to start his own studio "Eibocs".

Meanwhile, The Bhundu Boys were also having some success. Initially discovered by Bothwell Nyamhondera, the studio's young engineer, there were a succession of hit songs locally and several albums from the Bhundus, but in 1985 the studios were approached by Owen Elias and Champion Doug Veitch of Discafrique Records in the UK, with a view to release a selection of African band music in UK. A compilation of The Bhundu Boys and African Herb, an offshoot of Thomas Mapfumo's band, was released, and resulted in interest by the radio DJs John Peel, Andy Kershaw and Charlie Gillett. Shed responded in 1986 by licensing a compilation of Zimbabwean Bhundu Boys hits to Discafrique called "Shabhini", which took the UK world music public by storm. To the studio's disappointment, the band wanted to be released from their second three-year contract as they wanted to jump ship to Warner Bros. A deal was made between the Band and Shed Studios where all future royalty income, from existing recordings, would accrue solely to Shed Music in return from their contractual release. A second compilation of Shed recordings was released by Discafrique called "Tsvimbodzemoto", which also sold well, but that was the end of the recording careers of The Bhundu Boys at Shed Studios. Following his move to UK in 2000, Steve Roskilly collaborated with Gordon Muir, the Bhundu Boys' erstwhile manager, to produce a final compilation double CD called "The Shed Sessions", which reawakened the classic Bhundu music on CD again, including previously unreleased tracks. The CD continues to sell and is also available to stream on iTunes and Spotify.

== Independence celebrations ==
Back in 1981 Shed Studios was commissioned by the Zimbabwe Government to provide live sound for the first Independence Celebrations at Rufaro Stadium. With no PA system available in Salisbury, and very limited time available (three weeks), Roskilly was sent to London with a government minder in tow to buy the relevant necessary PA equipment. The gear was duly delivered to the stadium directly from the airport, without customs clearance, the day prior to the event and the celebrations went ahead successfully as planned. Subsequently, the Parliamentary Public Accounts Committee pronounced that the relevant government Ministry of Youth Sport and Recreation had not purchased the PA system in the laid down method, nor had it complied with the norms of importation. Shed Studios was not held accountable, as it merely acted as consultant to identify the equipment required. This was an internal government squabble that was nonetheless close to dangerous for the company.

== Studio developments ==
In 1981, Steve Hughes a Harare Night club owner and friend, invested in the company in order to build the second studio for Bothwell Nhamhondera, who had recently joined. Hughes became a director alongside Roskilly and Norris, managing disc releases, promotion and PR. Nyamhondera's talents soon saw him the engineer of choice for the local record companies Gramma and Gallo (later ZMC) that had by now started to hire studio time on a regular basis.

Two years later in 1983, after a stunning workload of band recordings, film tracks, and advertising jingles and soundtracks, Martin Norris left Zimbabwe for a new life in Brisbane, and Hughes left for South Africa, Roskilly decided to sell all the studio equipment to Gramma in order to help pay off their shareholding. The staff, Nhamhondera included, were taken on by Gramma directly and a new chapter began. Nyamhondera would later acquire the Legend status as one of Zimbabwe's greatest record producers.

== The Gramma Studio years ==
With all the equipment now owned by Gramma, Roskilly set about installing and developing new studios for Gramma at their premises in New Ardbennie.

Gramma had no shareholding in Shed Studios which now operated independently simply as a trading company. Roskilly however managed the new Gramma Studios in return for a reduced studio hire rate, and continued to produce advertising jingles and film tracks as Shed Studios. It was a good arrangement and business flourished. David Scobie joined as trainee engineer as did Henry Peters, ace bass guitarist. As a threesome the business continued to grow, and the studios developed even further when Gramma installed MCI 24 track 2" tape machines and a second studio.

== The Refugee Incident ==
The Zimbabwe Music Corporation brought the Canadian band Refugee into the studio in April 1986 to record a song called “Sunrise in Zimbabwe”. ZMC represented the label in Zimbabwe, through which the band released their music. The band had originally been brought to the country to perform in concert by Capricorn Promotions, but Capricorn had failed to provide a suitable PA system. Myles Hunter, lead singer, had written the 'Sunrise' track and suggested that if it were to be recorded, royalties from a record release could go to the “Save the Rhino” fund. This would therefore entail a second song to be recorded at a later date.

The 15-hour recording session went ahead with Steve Roskilly at the helm. There then appeared to be another hitch when Capricorn announced they could not pay for the session. After a brief legal battle, solicitors established that the recording would remain the property of the studio. Cliff Hunt, the band's manager agreed to make overall rights to Shed Studios as long as the proceeds from any future sale first settled the outstanding bill, then whatever was residual would accrue to the Rhino charity as originally intended.

Two years later, Roskilly asked his film producer colleague Ralph Stutchbury, to cut together some iconic sunrise shots alongside the powerful Refugee audio recording. He then took the potential advertisement to the ad agency representing the Zimbabwe Tourist Board, Lintas, who turned it down. The ad was then presented to Michael Hogg Advertising, who immediately took it for their upcoming Air Zimbabwe Campaign. In fact, a whole new campaign was built around the sunrise concept. The result was a huge success nationwide, and the Refugee recording went on to gain many awards for the ad agency. The fee from the agency covered the outstanding studio fees and the balance was made over to Save the Rhino as agreed.

YouTube features a fake version of the ad. Video of dubious video quality, purporting to be the original ad, uses a more recent recording of the music performed by another Zimbabwean musician, and former studio director, Bud Cockcroft. YouTube also features another video with the original soundtrack on the Shed Studios channel

== Stadium concerts ==
In 1987, Andy Zweck from Harvey Goldsmith Productions in London, and Neil Dunn, a friend of Roskilly's, brought the offer of becoming promoter for a pair of upcoming concerts for Paul Simon. The African Concerts were to be filmed as a promotional tool for the release of the “Graceland (album)”. The project went ahead as planned, promoted by Shed Recording Studios. Two concerts were recorded, playing to multi-racial audiences of 20,000 at a deliberately low ticket price of ZIM$5.00. Since the total budget was Zim$446,000, a shortfall of ZIM$246,000 was paid into Zimbabwe by Paul Simon to make up the difference.

Acting as technical manager Roskilly went on to work with Dunn for a series of further concerts including the Reebok Sponsored Human Rights Now! Harare concert in October 1988 with Bruce Springsteen, Tracy Chapman, Sting, Youssou N’Dour, and Peter Gabriel. Controversially, the PA for this concert came from Johannesburg in apartheid South Africa. Other concerts included UB40, Eric Clapton, and Randy Crawford until 1989 when such concerts were then able to be performed instead in the newly independent South Africa.

== More studio developments ==
In 1989, the company pulled out of the Gramma building and constructed 3 new studios in the basement of 123 Robert Mugabe Way. A Fostex B16 half inch 16 track and Allen & Heath Saber mixer handled studio 1 band recordings, a C Lab Notator sequencing system with Soundscape SSHDR1 hard-disc recorder and A & H series 8 mixer handled the ad industry music in studio 2, and sponsored radio programmes were recorded by Cherry Productions in Studio 3, based on Revox recorders. During the move, Scobie pulled away to set up his own studio and Peters left for Germany. Two new shareholders came aboard in the shape of Benny Miller, Thomas Mapfumo's preferred engineer, and briefly, Peter vanDeventer.

This was really the golden age of the studios. Benny Miller did many band recordings in studio 1 including some classic Mapfumo tracks and Kelly Rusike, another outstanding bassist, and younger member of The Rusike Brothers band, became engineer in 1990, handling the regular record company band sessions. Roskilly composed, performed and engineered advertising jingle productions in studio 2, and Sally Donaldson and Hilton Mambo operated Studio 3 as Cherry Productions, doing their sponsored radio programmes. When Bud Cockcroft put up some money to develop studio one to a Fostex G16, Shed gained another shareholder and longtime director. This was the setup for the next 5 years.

== Pro-Active Audio ==
In 1995, Roskilly started an offshoot called Prosound, which was to become a live sound production company. It took him away from the studios, and so studio engineer Kelly Rusike took over more of the computer studio work.

In 1996, the studios hosted an enthusiastic gap year student from Britain, Chris Martin. Martin was nephew to one of Roskilly's family friends. They operated and developed the new PA company together for about 6 months, and worked in the Soundscape SSHDR1- equipped digital studio producing advertising jingles as well as a theatrical backtrack for St. George's College, Harare, the Passion Play No Greater Love. This Elaine Gillespie production was performed outdoors to an audience of 1500 for 10 nights. Coldplay would form in the year following Martin's return to Britain to attend University College London.

Andrew McClymont replaced Chris Martin in 1997, as Prosound became Pro-Active Audio Zim, becoming hire manager, and the company took off, handling all sound services for the extensive World Council of Churches' 8th Assembly in 1998, led by general secretary Konrad Raiser.

== Final Move and Epilogue ==
Just prior to this event, Roskilly had bought a run-down ex farmhouse in Harare's Greendale district, on a 1-hectare plot. The main house was converted to offices and PA storage, the cottage converted to 2 studios and a service area, and surroundings planted to provide a peaceful setting for some serious chillout for recording bands.

With Kelly Rusike running the computer studio, a new face in the shape of Ex R.U.N.N. family bassist – Peter Muparutsa was brought in to run the 16-track analogue tape studio, doing all the record company business. As time went on, Isaac Chirwa, another long-standing associate, joined the team to assist Rusike.

In early 2000 however, Roskilly saw a downturn in Zimbabwe's advertising and disc business due to foreign currency cutbacks in the country, and the politically motivated farm invasions began in earnest against prime exporters. For Roskilly, the political future of the country was not looking good, and when other family issues also intervened, he set about moving back to his native UK. After building a pair of radio broadcast studios for the controversial SW Radio Africa organisation and then acting as station engineer for 2 years, he joined Cheltenham Stage Services, a live sound and lighting company. He resigned his directorship at the end of 2008 and as a founder member of Production AV Ltd, a young dynamic Audio Visual company, he specialised in providing AV permanent installations until he retired in 2017.

Back in Zimbabwe Shed Productions, the jingle productions company was sold to studio engineer Kelly Rusike, which continued till his untimely death in 2023; Shed Recording Studios which owned all the studio equipment was sold to Keith Farquharson, and Roskilly Enterprises which owned the premises was eventually sold to a new record company. Before being wound up, Shed Music, the publishing company assigned all its rights to Roskilly's newly incorporated Pro-Active Audio Ltd in the UK.

Shed Studios was a pioneer in the development of the music industry in Zimbabwe, taking its place on the Zimbabwe Music Industry Association board, and as chair of the Production House Association of Zimbabwe. From 1975 to 2000, its activities saw substantial competition from many other music studios and production houses, of which none survived. As an independent production company, it was an essential tool for emerging bands in the 80s and 90s, where contractual relationships with the record companies was considered not to be an option.
