= Biggie Tembo Jr. =

Zimbabwean Jit musician (born 1988)

Biggie Tembo Jr. (born 8 April 1988) is a Zimbabwean Jit musician who recorded for Gramma Records. He released his debut album, Rwendo, in 2010. He is the son of Bhundu Boys singer Biggie Tembo.

In 2012 he was engaged by Alick Macheso to open his shows.

== Rwendo track listing ==
1. Mucherechedzo
2. Mari
3. Kamukana
4. Simbimbino
5. Usipo
6. Rwemdo
7. Nguva
