= Jonah Sithole =

Zimbabwean musician (1952–1997)

Jonah Sithole (1952–1997) was a Zimbabwean guitarist, vocalist and composer, known particularly for the mbira-inspired style known as mbira-guitar or chimurenga music.

== Early life ==
Jonah Sithole was born in the province of Masvingo and grew up in the mining town of Zvishavane (formerly Shabani), where his older brother worked as a miner as well as a musician for the mining camp band. Jonah first picked up the guitar as a twelve-year-old. When his brother was at work, he would play his guitar, imitating the sounds that his brother practiced around the house.

Jonah eventually moved to Bulawayo, where he attended Mpopoma High School until he was expelled in 1969, when he was a form 2 student. By then he was a decent guitar and bass player, so he followed his brother to Kwekwe and convinced him to admit him to his band, the Jairosi Jiri Kwela Kings, as a bass player. A few months later, in 1970, the band got a bar contract in Mbare, Harare and became known as the Delphans. Jonah became the band's rhythm guitarist.

== Professional career ==
When the Delphans got a contract to play in Gweru, Jonah decided to remain in Harare with the purpose of starting his own band. In 1971, just three months into his first stint as a bandleader, he was approached by Jackson Phiri, leader of the Limpopo Jazz Band, a soukous (also known as Congolese rumba) outfit, to be their guitarist. The Lipopo Jazz Band was anxious to break into the increasingly competitive bar music scene by having a band members who could sing in the local languages. While with the Limpopo Jazz Band, Jonah learned to play Congolese rumba guitar styles. He was particularly enthralled by the guitar stylings of rumba Franco Luambo, but he also began developing the more traditional mbira inspired guitar sound for the Shona songs. In 1974, the Lipopo Jazz Band recorded the song Ndozvireva, which was an adaptation of the mbira song Taisireva. Together with the Hallelujah Chicken Run band's Ngoma Yarira (based on the traditional Karigamombe) and the M.D. Success's Kumntongo (based on the mbira song Kuzanga), the song was one of the first to transcribe mbira progressions onto guitar. Soon after that, the foreign members of the Lipopo Jazz Band were deported, and Jonah found himself playing with a slew of hotel bands with no names: “Most of these bands did not have names. They just had contracts. They belonged to that place. It's only now people realize it's important to have names.”

Jonah played a short stint with the Great Sounds, another outfit that specialized in Congolese rumba, before moving to Mutare in 1974 to play with the Pepsi Combo. Jonah suggested a name change to Vibrations and then Drifters. They played at the Zimunya Hotel, just outside Mutare for about a year before the band moved to Harare determined to land a performing contract. He approached the owner of the Jamaica Inn, located just outside Harare, but a vocalist without a band, Thomas Mapfumo, recently fired from the Hallelujah Chicken Run Band, had talked his way into a contract and use of the hotel musical kit. Since Jonah had a band but no contract or equipment, the two decided to join forces. They performed together at the Jamaica Inn for about two months until they were approached by a Harare businessman to perform at the Mushandira Pamwe Nightclub in Highfield, Harare. At this time, Sithole and Mapfumo were playing an "afro-rock" rather than the mbira-based style for which they were to become famous. After about three months, Jonah was muscled out of the group, but a few months later he used his influence with a new nightclub owner to rejoin Thomas Mapfumo and form the Blacks Unlimited (1975).

Later that year, financial difficulties forced Jonah to part ways with the Blacks Unlimited, and after a second stint with the Great Sounds, he moved back to Mutare and formed a new band, The Storm. In 1977, with The Storm, Jonah released his first single Sabhuku, which showcased Jonah's unique approach to the mbira-guitar style. It was also during the period from 1976-77 that Jonah started specializing in mbira music (Turino, p. 300). It was the authenticity of his chimurenga sound that prompted Thomas Mapfumo to disband his Acid Jazz (with the exception of guitarist Leonard Pickett Chiyangwa) and approach Jonah in 1978 to reform the Blacks Unlimited. Jonah Sithole also played guitar on Thomas Mapfumo's first album, Hokoyo! (recorded in 1977)although he was not officially part of the Acid Band. As Thomas and Jonah moved towards a more mbira-based repertoire, Thomas felt that Leonard Chiyangwa was not improving quickly enough in this new style, largely because his heavy drinking left him struggling with the hours of rehearsal. Leonard Chiyangwa was dismissed from the Blacks Unlimited as a consequence. Jonah played with Thomas Mapfumo and The Blacks Unlimited until 1981, and during this period the two teamed up to craft some of the most inspired songs of the chimurenga genre, including such classics as Pfumvu Paruzevha, Kuyaura, Shumba, Chitima Cherusununguko, Bhutsu Mutandarika, Chauya Chiruzevha, Dangurangu and Chipatapata. It was also during this period that Thomas Mapfumo was incarcerated for three months by the Ian Smith regime for his subversive lyrics. Jonah managed to keep the band going by taking over the lead vocal duties and recruiting a young guitar prodigy by the name of Ashton “Sugar” Chiweshe into the band.

In 1981, Jonah Sithole left the Blacks Unlimited to pursue a career as band leader with Deep Horizon.. His highlight single during that time was Kana Ndaguta (he recorded this song a decade later, but the lyric about assaulting his mother when drunk was conspicuously missing from the newer and more readily available version). In May 1985, Thomas Mapfumo was preparing to embark on his first European tour, and he asked Jonah to rejoin the Blacks Unlimited. Jonah stayed with the Blacks Unlimited until 1989, and this period saw him evolving his mbira-guitar sound to unreached heights. This was in part necessitated by the use, for the first time, of real mbiras in the Blacks Unlimited sound. Some of the highlights of this period include the classic albums Zimbabwe-Mozambique (1987) and Varombo Kuvarombo (1989, known outside Zimbabwe as Corruption). Many consider these two albums to be the Blacks Unlimited's best, and Jonah's now mature guitar style plays a big role. Jonah's signature sound is also reflected in massive singles such as Kariba, Ngoma Yekwedu, Nyamutamba Nemombe and Tongosienda.

In 1989, Jonah Sithole left the Blacks Unlimited once more, and played as a session musician, notably with the Pied Pipers as well as with the famed 1950s era marabi singer Dorothy Masuka, who had recently returned to Zimbabwe. In 1992, Jonah formed a new band, the Deep Horizon. Sabhuku, a compilation album highlighting the signature tracks from their 1992 and 1993 releases was released internationally in 1996.

In 1995, Jonah Sithole rejoined the Blacks Unlimited and performed on three albums;, the afro-rock venture Afro Chimurenga, Roots Chimurenga and the live-in-studio album Chimurenga: African Spirit Music which was recorded during a UK tour. Jonah's health started rapidly failing him soon after. He appeared on only one song, Tipeiwo Mari, on the 1997 album Chimurenga Movement. It was suspected by journalists that he died thereafter from AIDS complications in August of that year, but this is speculation. Background - Jonah committed himself to a last minute flight to the UK, and traveled light. He arrived to extremely cold UK winter weather and inadequately heated accommodations. He was unwell thereafter, but still gave the crowd a good show. After returning to Zimbabwe, Jonah was seeing a local GP. However, his health declined, and days after his hospital admission, it was discovered that he was on the wrong course of treatment (malaria pills), instead of pneumonia medications. Shortly thereafter, he died.

== Personal life ==
Jonah Sithole was married to Gladys Maigurira. They had two children; Tichaona Saul Sithole, born in 1982 and Tendai Sithole, born in 1986. Tendai suddenly died in Birmingham, UK in 2006 and was buried in Harare. He was an aspiring artist like his father Jonah Sithole and won talent awards for best artist in his adopted home of Birmingham. Tichaona is also a music producer and has previously worked on projects with Zimbabwean artists like Jusa Dementor and Juss Russ. Jonah is also survived by his eldest son, Dillon Mupingo.

== Guitar Style ==
While Jonah was fluent in many guitar styles, including rumba and afro-jazz, he is best known for his chimurenga guitar style, where he excelled in the “art of combining three- and four-beat rhythms in lyrical, flowing melodic lines.” Jonah set himself apart from other mbira-guitarists by the emotional expressiveness of his playing, which he achieved by using the mbira or vocalists to develop his guitar melodies rather than by merely accompanying the mbira or “filling in the gaps.” His album Sabhuku is filled with tracks that highlight his style (Sabhuku, Kusasana, Kana Ndaguta, Ereniya). With the Blacks Unlimited, Jonah's evolution can be tracked by listening to the albums Gwindingwi Rine Shumba(1980), Chimurenga For Justice (1985), Zimbabwe-Mozambique (1987), Varombo Kuvarombo (Corruption, 1989), Chimurenga:African Spirit Music (1995) and Roots Chimurenga (1996). Various singles compilations also feature Jonah Sithole's work from the mid-seventies until 1986.
