= Mpopoma High School =

School in Bulawayo, Zimbabwe

Mpopoma High School, which is also known as The High School, is a mixed government day school that is located in Bulawayo, Zimbabwe. The school was established in 1959 and is known as one of the best schools in the City of Bulawayo. The school has an annual enrollment of 1500+ students (all of whom are day scholars) and uses the double-shift system to deliver lessons. The School motto is Vela Mfundo meaning Show Up Education (We Embrace You). In addition to having notable alumni in many parts of the world, Mpopoma has excelled in both Academics and Sports.

== Academics ==
Mpopoma High School follows a ZIMSEC curriculum and caters for both Ordinary Level ("O" Level) and advanced ("A") level students. The school has, on several occasions, produced very good Advanced Level results. In 2016, the school recorded a 98.7% A level pass-rate (5% above the national average) based on ZIMSEC exams. In the 2014 advanced level exams, Mpopoma obtained a pass-rate of 97.83% making it the best school in Bulawayo and number 35 nationally.

== Sports and clubs ==
Mpopoma High School students take part in many sporting activities. The girls' football team made history in 2019 when they became the pioneering Bulawayo team to win the girls' title at the COPA Coca-Cola national finals. The team won a cash prize of USD10, 800 while the coach, Mr. Rugwevera won USD 1,500. Two of Mpopoma's students made it into the 2020 Young Mighty Warriors Women's Under 17 team which hopes to partake in the 2020 Women's Under-17 World Cup in India. In 2017, the school won the Bulawayo National Association of Secondary School Heads (Nash) track and field inter-districts athletics competition with sixteen gold medals in which the runners-up only had five gold medals. After representing Team Bulawayo at the national level, five of Mpopoma's athletes were selected to be on the national team. Mpopoma returned their title again in 2018 where the athletics team won 39 gold, 24 silver and 16 bronze medals. Another sport that Mpopoma High has excelled in is the Beach Volleyball; in 2019, Mpopoma were the national champions in the Under-19 Girls' category. Drama is yet another area that Mpopoma High School participates in; the notable IYASA also started as a Drama Club at Mpopoma High School.

== Notable alumni ==
- Fortune Chasi
- Tymon Mabaleka
- Thandolwenkosi Mlilo
- Sinikiwe Mpofu
- Sandra Ndebele
- Jonah Sithole
- Henry Tayali

== See also ==
- List of schools in Zimbabwe
- List of secondary schools in Bulawayo
