= The Rough Guide to the Music of Zimbabwe =

Compilation album by Various artists
- Released: 5 November 1996
- Genre: World, Zimbabwean
- Length: 69:13
- Label: World Music Network

Full series chronology
The Rough Guide to the Music of the Andes (1996)	The Rough Guide to the Music of Zimbabwe (1996)	The Rough Guide to the Music of North Africa (1997)

The Rough Guide to the Music of Zimbabwe is a world music compilation album originally released in 1996. Part of the World Music Network Rough Guides series, it focuses on the music of Zimbabwe, both traditional and modern. The release was compiled by Phil Stanton, co-founder of the World Music Network.

== Reception ==
Professional ratings
Review scores
Source	Rating
Allmusic	4.5/5 stars

Raymond McKinney of AllMusic rewarded the album with four and a half stars, calling it an "excellent introduction". Michaelangelo Matos, writing for the Chicago Reader, called it repetitious but pleasant, describing the tracks as "nice stuff" that "won't convert anyone."

== Track listing ==
No.	Title	Artist	Length
1.	"Buka Tiende"	Thomas Mapfumo & the Blacks Unlimited	5:04
2.	"Pombi"	The Bhundu Boys	5:11
3.	"Vimbayi"	The Four Brothers	8:07
4.	"Chigamba"	Stella Chiweshe	7:58
5.	"Dai Ndiine Mukoma"	Oliver Mtukudzi & The Black Spirits	6:47
6.	"Kana Vatsvene Vopinda"	Machanic Manyeruke	3:47
7.	"Ingoma Yakwethu"	Black Umfolosi	5:07
8.	"Punza"	Biggie Tembo	5:36
9.	"Taireva"	The Mbira Masters Of Zimbabwe	7:46
10.	"Tornados vs. Dynamos (3-3)"	Real Sounds	13:24
