= R.U.N.N. family =

R.U.N.N. Family were a Zimbabwean musical group that had several hits in the 1980s. Their songs combined mbira-inspired music with reggae and rhumba influences.

== Background ==
The group was made up of siblings Jerry and Peter Muparutsa, cousin Michael Muparutsa and nephews, Golden, Lawrence, and Tendai Eddison Muparutsa. At one point cousin Fortune Muparutsa, who also recorded as a solo artist was also a member. Lead singer, composer and bassist Peter Muparutsa, who became a studio engineer at Harare's recording studio Shed Studios, and continues to work in the music industry remains active behing the Mutare group.

== Hatichina Wekutamba Naye ==
One of the R.U.N.N. family's most successful songs was "Hatichina Wekutamba Naye", a lament for the recently deceased President of Mozambique Samora Machel. The short description given to the song on album artwork states:

"Someone keeps stirring and heating the pot. Chitepo (sic), Biko and now Samora Machel. They kill our friends. We can only pray to God and remember the inheritance of Samora Machel. Our life is the struggle."

This description refers to the controversy surrounding the aircrash in which Machel perished. Released in 1986 on the ZIM label (cat. # ZIM 410), the song proved popular enough to feature alongside Paul Matavire & the Jairos Jiri Band and Jonah Moyo on a compilation of Zimbabwean hits produced by the DiscAfrique label, best known for bringing the Bhundu Boys to international attention.

Charlie Gillett lauded the song as "One of the great soul records of the 1980s."

== See also ==
- List of African musicians

== Media ==
- Hear a sample of Hachina Wekutamba Naye
