= Chamunorwa =

Studio album by Thomas Mapfumo
- Released: 1991
- Genre: Chimurenga, shona
- Label: Mango

Thomas Mapfumo chronology
Zimbabwe Mozambique (1988)	Chamunorwa (1991)	Varombo Kuvarombo (1989)

Chamunorwa is an album by the Zimbabwean musician Thomas Mapfumo, released in 1991. He is credited with his band, Blacks Unlimited. The title translates to What Are We Fighting For. Chamunorwa was Mapfumo's final album for Mango Records.

Mapfumo supported the album with a North American tour. The album was a hit on Billboard's World Music Albums chart. It was banned from Zimbabwean radio.

== Production ==
Recorded in Harare, the album was remixed at Island Studios, in London. Mapfumo continued to use mbiras and hoshos, but made heavier use of brass and percussion than on previous albums.

== Critical reception ==
Professional ratings
Review scores
Source	Rating
AllMusic	4/5 stars
Calgary Herald	A
Chicago Tribune	3/4 stars
Robert Christgau	(neither)
The Encyclopedia of Popular Music	3/5 stars
MusicHound World: The Essential Album Guide	3/5 stars
Spin Alternative Record Guide	8/10

The New York Times deemed the album "a quiet triumph," writing that "the music rolls along on its six-beat pulse, lightening Mr. Mapfumo's doleful meditations with the sparkle of mbira lines and sure but laconic drumming." The Baltimore Sun wrote that "its gentle melodies and lithe, burbling rhythms require no translation—intriguingly infectious, they're enough to win over almost any listener."

The Chicago Tribune noted that "even those unfamiliar with [chimurenga] will find themselves seduced by the snaky guitar and mbira lines, complex net of percussion, bursts of horns and, driving everything, the distinctive rolling rhythms of Zimbabwean music... The beautiful irony is that by remaining true to his roots, Mapfumo has created something of universal appeal." The Washington Post stated that Mapfumo's "multilayered chimurenga explores an array of traditional Shona melodies and percussion and is softened by the gentle plinking of mbira thumb pianos."

The Spin Alternative Record Guide called the album "Mapfumo at his most basic, re-re-Africanizing the music by adding vigorous mbira parts and sticking close to rugged folk arrangements."

== Track listing ==
No.	Title	Length
1.	"Hwahwa"
2.	"Muramba Doro"
3.	"Chitima Ndikature"
4.	"Chamunorwa"
5.	"Hurokuro"
6.	"Nyama Yekugocha"
