= Four Brothers (band) =

Zimbabwean Jit band

The Four Brothers
- Origin: Harare, Zimbabwe
- Genres: Pop
- Years active: 1977-2002
- Labels: Cooking Vinyl, Gramma Records
- Past members: Marshall Munhumumwe (Principal founder); Never Mutare (Founder); Edward Matigasi (Founder); Aleck Chipaika (Founder); Frank Sibanda; Albert Ruwizhi; Robium Chauraya; Edward Zulu; James Nyamande

The Four Brothers were a pop group from Zimbabwe. The members were not brothers. They played fast-paced guitar-based pop music with songs sung in the Shona language. Their lead guitar string-plucking sound is reminiscent of the sound of the African mbira instrument and is a style known as jit.

== History ==
Founded in Zimbabwe (then Rhodesia) in 1977 by Marshall Munhumumwe and Never Mutare with Edward Matigasi and Aleck Chipaika, the band gained international recognition in the late 1980s with UK BBC Radio 1 DJ John Peel being their most well-known advocate.

Marshall Munhumumwe was the maternal uncle of Zimbabwean star Thomas Mapfumo. Marshall Munhumumwe was the last born in the family of Thomas Mapfumo's mother.

At the time the Four Brothers formed, bands in Rhodesia were not allowed to play traditional African music. The Four Brothers therefore played rock and roll cover versions of well-known artists such as the Beatles. They took up a residency position at the Saratoga bar in Salisbury (now Harare).

After the Chimurenga war of independence in Zimbabwe, it became possible to again play traditional music. The band's format and instruments are influenced by western rock and roll but the sound is evidently originating from Africa. The lead guitar is played in such a way as to sound like mbira. Most of the early recordings were produced at Shed Studios, by Bothwell Nyamhondera, during sessions for Gramma Records.

Marshall Munhumumwe wrote most of the band's songs and music as well as unusually being both the lead singer and drummer. Their first big hit in Zimbabwe, 'Makorokoto', celebrated Zimbabwean independence. 'Makorokoto' means 'congratulations' in the Shona language.

== International recognition ==
After signing a deal with British record label Cooking Vinyl, the band toured the UK and Canada. At this point a rift appeared between Marshall Munhumumwe and Patrick Mukwamba as he claims he was cut out of the deal and left behind. This tour apparently brought the band a greater degree of musical freedom, enabling them to buy new instruments and to record more.

BBC Radio 1 DJ John Peel championed The Four Brothers in the UK. They recorded four radio sessions for his show between 1988 and 2000. The band played at Peel's surprise 50th birthday party at his home and he selected 'Pasi Pano Pane Zviedzo' as one of his favourite records of all time on the radio show Desert Island Discs in 1990. Peel is often quoted as describing the Four Brothers as "..the best live band in the world".

== Death of main members ==
In 1997 founder member Marshall Munhumumwe suffered a stroke, following a car crash. He was unable to continue to perform with the band and was replaced by Albert Ruwizhi. Munhumumwe died in 2001 at the age of 49 and the following year bass guitarist Never Mutare died. The last surviving member, Frank Sibanda, died peacefully in December 2010.

== Controversy and legacy ==
In 2007, former band member James Nyamande, who had been kicked out by Frank Sibanda after its demise in 2002, attempted to resuscitate the band but failed. By then he had formed his own band, the Makombe Brothers, which performed several Four Brothers songs. In 2012, Nyamande released an album under the Four Brothers name in an attempt to maintain the band's legacy, but was ordered by a civil court not to use the name, after objection from Marshall Munhumumwe's family.

In 2000 Marshall Munhumumwe bought a house next door to Patrick Mukwamba in Seke Township. He moved in with his second wife, Joanna, his oldest son, Marshall Munhumumwe Jr., and Shingayi Munhumumwe, his second-born son, both from his first marriage.

In 2016, Marshall Munhumumwe Jr., the son of the founder, joined the new Four Brothers/Makombe Brothers band as their administrator, to maintain his father's legacy.

== Discography and band members ==
=== Mandega/Makorokoto ===
(7-inch single 1977) Zimbabwe Broadcasting Corporation (ZBC)

Mandega (Doing it alone) - Their 1st song. Makorokoto (Congratulations) - Their 1st hit.

1. Mandega
2. Makorokoto

=== Rugare ===
(US LP/Cassette 1986) WEA Records/Tusk Music Company SUH1048/ZSUH1048

Marshall Munhumunwe - lead vocals, drums, composer

1. Rugare
2. Pahukama
3. Uchandifunga
4. Wakasarudza Akanaka
5. Unondichemera Unondipei
6. Usagare Ne Chigumbu
7. Ndakatadzeiko
8. Swere Ngoma

=== Ndakatambura Newe ===
(LP 1987) Kumusha/Gramma Records KSALP119

1. Ndakatambura Newe
2. Nhaka Yemusiiranwa
3. Ane Mari Ndiye Mukuru
4. Chiiko Ichi?
5. Mashoko Ababa Namai
6. Zvaita Sei?
7. Vematongo Rooranai
8. Udza Vamwe Vako

=== Title ===
Patrick Mkwamba and The Four Brothers

1. Zvinonaka Zvinodhura
2. Dai Ndiri Shiri
3. ..

=== Tonosangana Ikoko ===
Patrick Mkwamba and The Four Brothers

(LP 1984) Kumusha/Gramma Records KSALP104

1. Wapenga Nayo Bonus
2. Vakakunda Zviedzo
3. Kubhawa Handigare
4. Emeriya Usanyengedzwe
5. Mombe Youmai
6. Uri Tsotsi
7. Ndatendeuka
8. Mwana Wandaida Kuroora

=== Rudo Chete ===
(LP 1988) Kumusha/Gramma Records KSALP124

1. Rudo Chete
2. Ngatipindukewo
3. Vabereki
4. Wakazvarwa Sei
5. Kutambura Chete
6. Munondizvidza
7. Chenjerera Ngozi
8. Nhamo

=== Uchandifunga ===
(UK 12-inch single 1988) (Recorded at Shed Studios, Harare, Zimbabwe) Cooking Vinyl FRY005T

1. Uchandifunga (Dance remix)
2. Makorokoto (lyrics wanted by public demand)
3. Guhwa Uri Mwana Waani

=== Vimbayi ===
(7-inch single 1988) Gramma Records

1. Vimbayi Part I
2. ..

=== Makorokoto ===
(UK compilation CD/LP Gramma Records 1988 © Cooking Vinyl 1989) Cooking Vinyl COOKCD014/COOK014

Marshall Munhumumwe - drums and lead vocals Never Mutare – bass and vocals Aleck Chipaika – rhythm guitar and vocals Edward Matiyasi – lead guitar and vocals

Makorokoto was released on the UK on the Cooking Vinyl record label and uses A Serengeti licensed product from Gramma Records, Zimbabwe. It was a CD and LP release. The CD contains all 16 tracks while the LP version contains only 10 tracks. When the LP Bros was released the following year, the tracks that did not appear on the Makorokoto LP were included as a free six-track EP. Gramma Records/Cooking Vinyl CHEF002X

1. Uchandifunga
2. Vimbayi (2)
3. Rumbidzai (6)
4. Makorokoto
5. Rudo Imoto (1)
6. Pasi Pano Pane Zviedzo (4)
7. Maishoko Ababa Namai (3)
8. Guhwa Uri Mwana Waani
9. Wapenga Nayo Bonus
10. Siya Zviriko (5)
11. Rugare
12. Ndakatadzeiko
13. Pamusoroi
14. Nhaka Yemusiiranwa
15. Sara Tasangana
16. Ndakatambura

=== Makorokoto ===
(UK 7-inch single) Earthworks DIG002

1. Makorokoto
2. Wasira Kupurezha

=== The Peel Seesions ===
(UK 12-inch red vinyl EP 1988) BBC Enterprises Ltd./Strange Fruit SFPS070

Never Mutare - bass and backing vocals Frank Sibanda - guitar and backing vocals Alick Chipaika - guitar and backing vocals Marshall Ticharwa Munhumumwe - drums and lead vocals

1. Rugare
2. Uchandifunga
3. Vimbayi
4. Pahukama

=== Pasi Pano Pane Zviedzo ===
(7-inch single 1989)

1. Pasi Pano Pane Zviedzo
2. ..

=== Bros ===
(UK CD/LP 1989) Cooking Vinyl COOKCD023/COOK023

Frank Sibanda replaced Edward Matiyasi – Lead guitar and vocals

1. Rudo Chete
2. Ngatipindukewo
3. Nhamo
4. Kutambura Chete
5. Zuro Chisara
6. Munondizvidza
7. Vabereki
8. Chenjerera Ngozi
9. Wakazvarwa

=== The Best Of The Four Brothers (Makorokoto) ===
(US compilation CD 1990) Atomic Theory ATD1106

1. Uchandifunga
2. Vimbayi
3. Rumbidzai
4. Makorokoto
5. Rudo Imoto
6. Pasi Pano Pane Zviedzo
7. Maishoko Ababa Namai
8. Guhwa Uri Mwana Waani
9. Wapenga Nayo Bonus
10. Siya Zviriko
11. Rugare
12. Ndakatadzeiko
13. Pamusoroi
14. Nhaka Yemusiiranwa
15. Sara Tasangana
16. Ndakatambura

=== Mukadzi Wepiri ===
(LP 1990) Kumusha/Gramma Records KSALP129

1. Mukadzi Wepiri
2. Chidhakwa
3. Mazita Nezviito
4. Zvakona
5. Chiroora
6. Tezvara
7. Musandodaro
8. Chandavengerwa

=== Wachiveiko? ===
Marshall Munhumumwe & The Four Brothers

(LP, Cassette 1993) Kumusha/Gramma Records KSALP147, L4KSALP147

1. Wachiveiko?
2. Ndiregerei
3. Karingazuva
4. Ndatove Muranda
5. Kana Wangoroora
6. Zvichakunetsa
7. Regai Nditaure

=== Mambakwedza ===
Marshall Munhumumwe and Four Brothers

(LP 1994) Gramma Records

1. Gona Ramachingura
2. Nditumbure
3. Muranda
4. Mwana Wezimbabwe
5. Buka Tiende
6. Mhuri Yandiremera
7. Pfumo Rangu
8. Musha Waparara

=== Kumawere ===
(LP 1994) Gramma Records

1. Kumawere
2. Maivepi Pandaikudai
3. Hapana Asina Muvengi
4. Matinetsa
5. Mativenga
6. Hama Dzatipfuvisa
7. Chero Uchindida

=== Mbereko Yakaramba ===
Marshall Munhumumwe and Four Brothers

(LP 1994)

1. Mbereko Yakaramba
2. Ndivumbamireiwo
3. Takabva Neko
4. Chawanzwa Usachipamhidzire
5. Chandagona Ndipembedzeiwo
6. Tichakunda Chete
7. Shungu Hadziuraye

=== Pfimbi Yemashoko ===
(LP) Gramma Records

1. ..

=== Ndivhumbamireiwo ===
(7-inch single 1996) Zimbabwe Music Corporation (ZMC) FYF559

1. Ndivhumbamireiwo Part I
2. Ndivhumbamireiwo Part II

=== Greatest Hits 1994 To 1996 ===
Marshall Munhumumwe and Four Brothers

(compilation CD 1996) Zimbabwe Music Corporation (ZMC) CDZIL308

1. Ndibvumbamireiwo
2. Matinetsa
3. Chero Uchindida
4. Vatendi
5. Tauraya Rudzi Rwedu
6. Rudo Rukave Ruvengo
7. Mbereko Yakaramba
8. Mativenga
9. Chawanzwa Usachipamhidzire
10. Kumawere

=== The Hits Of The Four Brothers Volume 2 ===
(compilation CD 1996) Gramma Records ZCD121

1. Pfimbi Yemashoko
2. Wachiveiko
3. Rwendo Rusina Muperekedzi
4. Vimbayi
5. Ane Mari Ndiye Mukuru
6. Rudo Imoto
7. Rudo Chete
8. Mwambakwedza
9. Wadiwa Musamuzonde
10. Ndakatambura Newe
11. Rugare
12. Siya Zviriko
13. Guhwa Uri Mwana Waani

=== Manga Manga ===
(UK CD 1998) Positive Cultural Promotions (PCP) PCPCD02

Never Mutare – bass guitar and backing vocals Frank Sibanda – lead and acoustic guitar and backing vocals Albert Ruwizhi – drums and lead vocals Robium Chauraya – rhythm guitar and backing vocals (Aleck Chipaika played keyboards at around this time but does not appear on the CD)

1. Hapana Achanyara
2. Usagare Nechigumba
3. Mugomba
4. Vana Ve Mazuvaano
5. Ndinotenda
6. Hunhu Wemunhu
7. Chakaipa Chiri Nyore
8. Sarudzai Waenda
9. Vamwene Vanoshusha

=== Early Hits Of The Four Brothers ===
(compilation CD 2000) Gramma Records CDGRAMMA182

1. Uchandifunga
2. Vimbayi
3. Rumbidzai
4. Makorokoto
5. Rudo Imoto
6. Pasi Pano Pane Zviedzo
7. Maishoko Ababa Namai
8. Guhwa Uri Mwana Waani
9. Wapenga Nayo Bonus
10. Siya Zviriko
11. Rugare
12. Ndakatadzeiko
13. Pamusoroi
14. Nhaka Yemusiiranwa

=== Zvehama ===
(Cassette 2002) Zimbabwe Music Corporation (ZMC) ZC361

1. ..

=== Ruvengo ===
(CD 2004) Gramma Records

1. Shungu Dzangu
2. Ruvengo
3. Rufu
4. Kunaka Kwechimwe
5. Mwari Baba
6. Molini
7. Hwenyakwese
8. Shinga Mwanangu
9. Shinga mwanangu

The recordings of The Four Brothers appear on many compilation albums. 'Pasi Pano Pane Zviedzo' appears on the 2006 compilation in tribute to John Peel Right Time, Wrong Speed.
