= Corruption (album) =

Studio album by Thomas Mapfumo
- Released: 1989
- Genres: Chimurenga, Afro pop
- Label: Mango

Thomas Mapfumo chronology
Chamunorwa (1989)	Corruption (1989)	Shumba: Vital Hits of Zimbabwe (1990)

Corruption is an album by the Zimbabwean musician Thomas Mapfumo (credited with his band, the Blacks Unlimited), released in 1989. The album criticized the government of Robert Mugabe. Mugabe's displeasure with the criticism eventually forced Mapfumo into exile, and Mapfumo's music was barred from Zimbabwean radio. The title track was discussed in the Zimbabwean parliament, around the same time as several government officials were indicted as part of a smuggling ring.

Corruption was Mapfumo's first album to be released by a major label in North America. A Zimbabwean version of the album, titled Varombo Kuvarombo, had been released by Gramma Records.

== Production ==
Similar to the signing of King Sunny Adé, Mapfumo was signed to Mango Records in part due to label head Chris Blackwell's desire to find a "worldbeat" star to replace the late Bob Marley.

Mapfumo sang the title track in English, with the rest of the songs sung in Shona. His intention was to inform the world of the conditions in Zimbabwe; to that end, the song's music incorporates elements of reggae and R&B. Other songs address Zimbabwe's war with Mozambique.

== Critical reception ==
Professional ratings
Review scores
Source	Rating
AllMusic	3/5 stars
Robert Christgau	A−
The Encyclopedia of Popular Music	3/5 stars
MusicHound World: The Essential Album Guide	3.5/5 stars
Spin Alternative Record Guide	9/10

Robert Christgau wrote: "Never have his guitars sounded more like mbiras; never have his rhythms better evoked their own intricate selves. The vocals are also relaxed, giving off an aura of ruminative wisdom that may even have some truth to it." Trouser Press thought that, "delivered with ... heavenly allure by pretty backing vocals, crisp horns and gently rolling tempos, the songs on Corruption grapple with troubles aplenty." The Chicago Tribune deemed the album "an excellent introduction to Mapfumo's work," writing that "his music is richly melodic, rhythmic, accessible and filled with a strong social consciousness."

The Washington Post stated: "Reflecting the dominant Shona culture, in which the thumb piano is the key instrument, Mapfumo's music reflects both Western instrumentation (rippling electric guitar lines in particular) and African tradition (the use of proverbs and innuendo in the lyrics and slowly evolving, complex interactions of rhythmic and vocal melodies)." The Atlanta Journal-Constitution determined that "contrapuntal interplay in songs such as 'Muchadura (You Will Confess)' offer meter-mashing examples of his successful fusion of clashing African and European rhythms."

AllMusic wrote that, "taking on the failed government that took power after independence, Mapfumo continues apace here with fluid grooves and potent barbs."

== Track listing ==
No.	Title	Length
1.	"Moyo Wangu"	6:02
2.	"Varombo Kuvarombo"	6:26
3.	"Shabeen"	6:36
4.	"Corruption"	8:29
5.	"Muchadura"	5:03
6.	"Handina Munyama"	5:27
7.	"Kupera Kwevanhu"	5:46
8.	"Chigwindiri"	6:00
