= Sandra Ndebele =

Zimbabwean musician, dancer, actress

- Birth name: Sandra Ndebele
- Genres: Afro Pop
- Occupations: Musician; dancer; actress
- Website: sandrandebele.com

Sandra Ndebele is a Zimbabwean musician, dancer and actress.

== Career ==
Ndebele started participating in the performing arts while at school and later joined the group IYASA with which she toured the world. She later released 10 track her solo album in 2003. She went on to perform at various events with bigger artists like Oliver Mtukudzi and Alick Macheso. 2003 was also the year she won 3 Awards at the Zimbabwe Music Awards. Her high energy dance routines made her popular with a lot of people although some raised concerns with her saying her dances were sexually provocative and suggestive. Her singles, Malaika and Mama were fan favorites. She has gone on to release many other songs and albums. She rebranded in 2019 and sought new dancers to join her group as she prepared for a new album. Over the years Ndebele has collaborated with various musicians including Jah Prayzah on a love song called Mushona neMuNdevere. She has also collaborated with the likes of Ammara Brown, Sulumani Chimbetu and Somandla Ndebele. Recently it was reported that Sandra Ndebele will be acting in a Netflix film, The Bad Bishop to be filmed in South Africa.
