= Thomas Mapfumo =

Zimbabwean musician (born 1945)

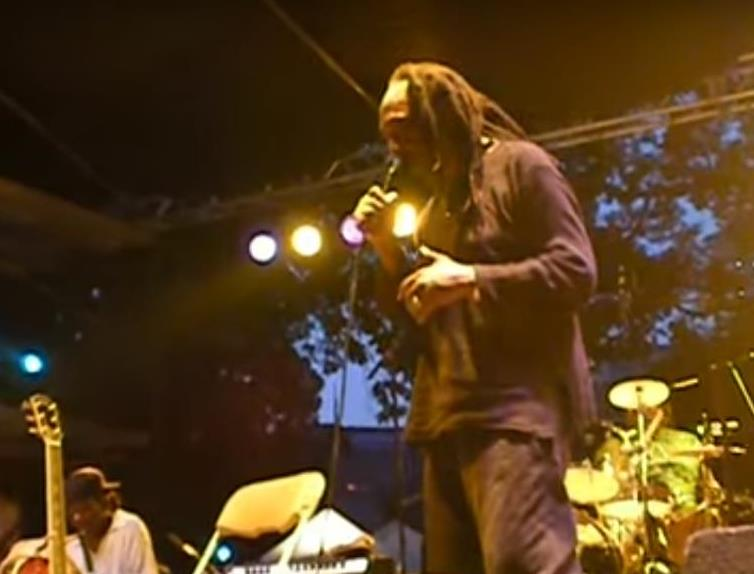
- Mapfumo in 2011

Background information
- Also known as: Mukanya, The Lion of Zimbabwe
- Born: July 2, 1945 (age 81)
- Origin: Mazowe, Southern Rhodesia (now Zimbabwe)
- Genre: Chimurenga music
- Occupation: Singer-songwriter
- Instruments: Vocals, Lead guitar
- Years active: 1961–present
- Website: http://www.thomas-mapfumo.com/

Thomas Tafirenyika Mapfumo (born July 3, 1945) is a Zimbabwean musician. He is nicknamed "The Lion of Zimbabwe" and "Mukanya" (the praise name of his clan in the Shona language) for his immense popularity and for the political influence he wields through his music, including his sharp criticism of the government of former Zimbabwean president Robert Mugabe. He both created and popularized Chimurenga music, and is known for his distinctive voice and slow-moving style.

Mapfumo was imprisoned without charges under the white-dominated regime of Rhodesia, and he was hounded by the Mugabe government of Zimbabwe that succeeded it. He lived in exile in the United States for two decades, and in April 2018, returned to Zimbabwe for the first time since 2005 to perform a concert.

== Biography ==
Mapfumo was born in 1945 in Marondera, Mashonaland East, a town southeast of Harare, the capital of Zimbabwe, though at the time the capital was called Salisbury and the country was a colony of Great Britain called Southern Rhodesia (becoming Rhodesia in ordinary usage after Northern Rhodesia gained independence as Zambia). He lived a traditional, rural Shona lifestyle until the age of ten, when his family moved to the Harare township of Mbare. It was during these early years that he was exposed to the traditional music of the Shona, the influence of which would drive his later music to incorporate and/or reflect the sounds of the ngoma drum and the mbira, a metal-pronged instrument with spiritual importance.

== Early career ==
He joined his first band, the Zutu Brothers (although, Encyclopædia Britannica says it was the Cyclones), as a singer at the age of 16. From then he was always in one band or another, such as The Wagon Wheels with Afro jazz musician Oliver Mtukudzi and guitarist James Chimombe, sometimes doing odd jobs on the side as well, including chicken farming. Hence the name of his 1972 band, the Hallelujah Chicken Run Band.

Mapfumo's band were given the rare opportunity by Paul Tangi Mhova Mkondo, an African nationalist and music promoter, who provided money and resources to the group. He allowed them to perform at Club Mutanga (Pungwe) which, at the time, was the only night club available for blacks under Rhodesia's policy of segregation.

He played mostly covers of American rock and soul tunes, such as Otis Redding or Elvis Presley, until he was in the Hallelujah Chicken Run Band. There he introduced the innovation of adapting traditional Shona music to modern rock instrumentation.

He worked with guitarist Joshua Dube (Leopard Man's Africa Music Guide says Jonah Sithole) to transcribe the sounds of the chief instrument of traditional Shona music, the mbira to the electric guitar. He also started singing primarily in the Shona language, rather than in English. Joshua Dube started to experiment mbira on guitar on Take One recorded in 1974.

== Political undertones ==
Simply drawing on the native musical tradition and singing in his native language was a political statement. Rhodesia was ruled by a minority of white individuals who derogated the native black population and culture. But more than that, his lyrics became overtly political, supporting the revolution that was developing in the rural areas, what the Rhodesian government called "the communal lands". He called his new style of music Chimurenga. In Shona it is derived from one of the architects of the first Black Uprising of 1896 called Murenga, and is the name of the wars of liberation in both the late 19th century and the bush war from 1960s up to the Lancaster House Agreement of 1979. His songs openly called for the violent overthrow of the government, with lyrics like "Mothers, send your sons to war."

== Political overtones ==
Mapfumo's music caught the attention of the Rhodesian government with his song "Hokoyo!", meaning "Watch out!" The government banned the record from the state-controlled radio and threw him into a prison camp without charges in 1979. They were unable to stop his records from being played in discos or on radio stations they did not control, including the Voice of Mozambique. Large demonstrations in protest of his arrest and an inability to find charges against him forced the government to release him after three months.

Free elections were held in 1980, and a new government was installed. Mapfumo performed at a celebratory concert that also featured Bob Marley. In later years, he would come to criticize the same government he, in some ways, helped bring to power.

The PRI-syndicated radio program Afropop Worldwide ran a feature on Thomas Mapfumo in late 1988/early 1989. Host Georges Collinet describes Mapfumo as living in the low-density suburbs with his wife, who worked at a law office in downtown Harare, and his two children—a boy and a girl. And he drove a blue Ford with fake leopard-skin seat covers.

Most of his songs were still political, dealing with poverty and other social issues. Mapfumo comments on the fact that he does not sing many love songs: "All you need if you wanna get into the bedroom... You've got a wife. You do it. You don't have to sing a song about it." Collinet also observes that Mapfumo can not sing anything he wants: "Clearly he can't sing 'Down with President Mugabe' – but he wouldn't want to. He supports the present government." However, that would soon change.

Recorded at Shed Studios in Harare, by long-time engineer Benny Miller, Mapfumo released the album Corruption in 1989. It criticised Mugabe and his government, with which Mapfumo was becoming more and more disillusioned. Mugabe was not happy with Mapfumo, either, and Mapfumo became the target of government harassment. Mapfumo was accused of being involved with a stolen-car ring. Things got uncomfortable enough that Mapfumo moved to Eugene, Oregon in the late 1990s. After Mugabe's overthrow in 2017, he returned to Zimbabwe, to a massive show named 'Homecoming Bira' at Glamis Arena in Harare on April 28, 2018. The homecoming show proved that Mapfumo was out of political danger, and he returned for more shows in many parts of Zimbabwe between December 2018 and March 2019. He returned to his United States base after the four-month visit to Zimbabwe.

Thomas Mapfumo tours internationally, and still sings and speaks out about the problems of Zimbabwe. His Chimurenga style of music influenced other Zimbabwean musicians, including the Bhundu Boys and Stella Chiweshe.

== Discography ==
- Shumba (1990, Earthworks)

=== Thomas Mapfumo and the Acid Band ===
- Hokoyo! (1978, Chimurenga Music)

=== Thomas Mapfumo & the Blacks Unlimited ===
- Gwindingwi Rine Shumba (1981, Chimurenga Music)
- Mabasa (1983, Chimurenga Music, Gramma Records)
- Ndangariro (1983, Afro Soul)
- Chimurenga For Justice (1985, Rough Trade)
- Mr Music (Africa) (1985, Afro Soul)
- Zimbabwe Mozambique (1988, Chimurenga Music)
- Chamunorwa (1989, Chimurenga Music)
- Varombo Kuvarombo (1989, Chimurenga Music)
- Corruption (1989, Mango)
- Chimurenga Masterpiece (1990, Chimurenga Music)
- Hondo (1991, Chimurenga Music)
- Chimurenga International (1993, Chimurenga Music)
- Chimurenga Varieties (1994, Chimurenga Music)
- Roots Chimurenga (1996, Chimurenga Music)
- Sweet Chimurenga (1996, Chimurenga Music)
- Afro Chimurenga (1996, Chimurenga Music)
- Chimurenga '98 (1998, Anonymous Web Productions)
- Live at El Rey (1999, Anonymous Web Productions)
- Chimurenga Explosion (2000, Anonymous Web Productions)
- Chimurenga Unlimited Hits Vol 1 ( 2007, Chimurenga Music)
- Chimurenga Rebel (2002, Anonymous Web Productions)
- Zvichapera (2002)
- Chimurenga Unlimited Hits Vol 2
- Chimurenga Unlimited Vol 3
- Toi Toi (2003)
- Rise Up (2005, digital download; 2006, Real World Records)
- Exile (2010, Sheer Sound)
- Danger Zone (2015, Chimurenga Music Company)
- Live @ The Sanctuary for Independent Media (2016, Chimurenga Music)
- Ndikutambire (2023, Chimurenga Music Company)

=== Compilation appearances ===
- The Rough Guide to the Music of Zimbabwe (1996, World Music Network)
- Roots Rocking Zimbabwe: The Modern Sound of Harare' Townships 1975–1980 (2025, Analog Africa No.41)

== See also ==
- Afropop
- Chimurenga
- Music of Zimbabwe
- Chimurenga music
- Hate speech
- Political prisoner
