= True Jit =

Studio album by Bhundu Boys
- Released: 1987
- Studio: Power Plant
- Label: Jit Five; Mango
- Producer: Robin Millar

Bhundu Boys chronology
Tsvimbodzemoto (1987)	True Jit (1987)	Pamberi (1989)

True Jit is an album by the Zimbabwean band the Bhundu Boys, released in 1987, with an international release in 1988.

The band supported the album with a North American tour. True Jit sold around 30,000 copies in its first decade of release.

== Production ==
Recorded in London, at Power Plant Studios, the album was produced by Robin Millar. Breaking a promise to sing only in Shona, the band recorded some songs with English lyrics. The Bhundu Boys later expressed regret over allowing their record company to dictate so much of the album's sound.

== Critical reception ==
Professional ratings
Review scores
Source	Rating
AllMusic	4.5/5 stars
Chicago Sun-Times	3.5/4 stars
Robert Christgau	B+
The Encyclopedia of Popular Music	4/5 stars
MusicHound World: The Essential Album Guide	4.5/5 stars

Robert Christgau wrote that "they're victims of crossover, compromising and accommodating when they should be expanding and appropriating... And they're still not half-bad." The New York Times noted that the album "mixes in some South African jive and West African soukous, moving toward pan-African music." The Times called it "a light, breezy foray" and a "harnessing [of] traditional shuffling rhythms and light, trilling guitar patterns to a modern pop sensibility."

The Christian Science Monitor concluded that True Jit "is aimed at the American pop market, and loses in the process," but conceded that "the group still has the lilting rhythms, complex guitar countermelodies, and harmonically rich vocals." USA Today stated that the band link "anti-apartheid and Pan-African messages with the joys of dancing." The Financial Times deemed it an "exhilarating ... and barrier breaking fusion of Africa and the West."

AllMusic wrote that the album sacrificed "the elegant simplicity of their earlier work for an over-produced, Westernized sound that alienated their core fan base."

== Track listing ==
No.	Title	Length
1.	"Jit Jive"
2.	"My Foolish Heart"
3.	"Chemedzevana"
4.	"Rugare"
5.	"Vana (The Children)"
6.	"Wonderful World"
7.	"Ndoitasei"
8.	"Susan"
9.	"African Woman"
10.	"Happy Birthday"
11.	"Jekesa"
