= Rise Up (Thomas Mapfumo album) =

Studio album by Thomas Mapfumo
- Released: 2005 (digital download); 2006 (physical release)
- Genre: Chimurenga
- Label: Real World
- Producer: Thomas Mapfumo

Thomas Mapfumo chronology
Chimurenga Rebel (2002)	Rise Up (2005)	Exile (2010)

Rise Up is an album by the Zimbabwean musician Thomas Mapfumo, released in 2005. He is credited with his band, the Blacks Unlimited. The album was initially released as a digital download. While Mapfumo was allowed to travel to Zimbabwe, his more recent music continued to be banned from the country's radio airwaves and was difficult to find in stores. After the album's release, Mapfumo felt that it was no longer safe to visit Zimbabwe. Mapfumo supported the album with a North American tour.

== Production ==
Produced by Mapfumo, the album was recorded in Eugene, Oregon. This lineup of the Blacks Unlimited was made up of 14 members, including a horn section. Many of the songs were attacks on Robert Mugabe and his government. Mapfumo sang most of the songs in Shona.

== Critical reception ==
Professional ratings
Review scores
Source	Rating
AllMusic	4/5 stars
Robert Christgau	B+
Pitchfork	8.0/10
The Washington Informer	4/5 stars

Robert Christgau determined that "good riffs do still come to Mapfumo, especially when he's pondering his loss of a home market." The Financial Times wrote: "Rich with brass stabs and spiky guitar meshing with the metallic sound of mbira thumb pianos, for the most part Rise Up lopes easily." Pitchfork noted that "the synth-bass prodding 'Ndodya Marasha (I'm Mad as Hell)' lends an almost imperceptible urgency to the repetitive, deceptively static chord progression, until an upbeat break busts you out of the funk."

The Guardian said that "many of the songs are slower than before, though still with a distinctive, rhythmic backing from guitars and mbira." The Daily Telegraph stated that "plaintive guitars and crashing drums sound out over a deliciously swinging and exquisitely irregular whirl of sound."

AllMusic deemed the album "a tough, gritty, graceful recording that captures the heartbreak, dislocation, pain, and hope of the struggle in the grain of Mapfumo's voice and in the endlessly entrancing echo of the mbira."

== Track listing ==
No.	Title	Length
1.	"Kuvarira Mukati / Suffer in Silence"
2.	"Ndogura Masango / Hitting the Road"
3.	"Mukadzi Wangu / My Wife"
4.	"Handimbotya / I'm Not Afraid"
5.	"Marudzi Nemarudzi / Different Races"
6.	"Zvakuwana / It's Payback Time"
7.	"Ndodya Marasha / I'm Mad as Hell"
8.	"Hende Baba / Let's Go, Father"
9.	"Zvirwere / Diseases"
10.	"Vanofira Chiiko? / What Are They Dying For?"
11.	"Pasi Hariguti / The Earth's Hunger Is Insatiable"
