= Champion Doug Veitch =

Scottish musician and songwriter

Douglas Veitch, better known as Champion Doug Veitch (born 1960) is a Scottish musician and songwriter.

== Biography ==
Born in Hawick, the self-styled 'King of Caledonian Swing' rose to some prominence in the mid-1980s. A favourite of John Peel, for whom he recorded two radio sessions, he holds the record for having most (six) consecutive NME singles of the week. His music was a ground-breaking polycultural mix, using elements from dub, reggae, country music and Scottish folk music, which foretold the cross cultural mixing more common in later years.

In 1985, he co-founded the label DiscAfrique with his colleague Owen Elias, which was one of the first world music labels in the United Kingdom, releasing records by The Bhundu Boys, Orchestre Baobab and The Four Brothers amongst others.

In 1989, he released an album of Scottish country dance music with his wife under the moniker Martin, Doug and Sara.

He later drifted out of the music industry due to personal issues, and took a PhD in woodland management. Recently however he has reunited with Bhundu Boys guitarist Rise Kagona under the name Culture Clash. Unusually Veitch sings the songs in Shona rather than his native tongue. The duo released the album Tanzwa Neku Tambura: We've Suffered Enough in 2007., he has since become a window cleaner...

== Discography ==
=== Champion Doug Veitch ===
All 7" unless stated.

- "Lumiere Urban" (1982)
- "Another Place, Another Time" (1983)
- "Not the Heart" (1984)
- "One Black Night" (1985)
- "Jumping into Love" / "Deep End Version" (1985)
- "Margarita" (1986)
- The Original (album, Bongo Records, 1989)

=== Martin, Doug and Sara ===
- Reelin' (album, Munro Records, 1989)
