= Andy Kershaw =

English broadcaster (1959–2026)

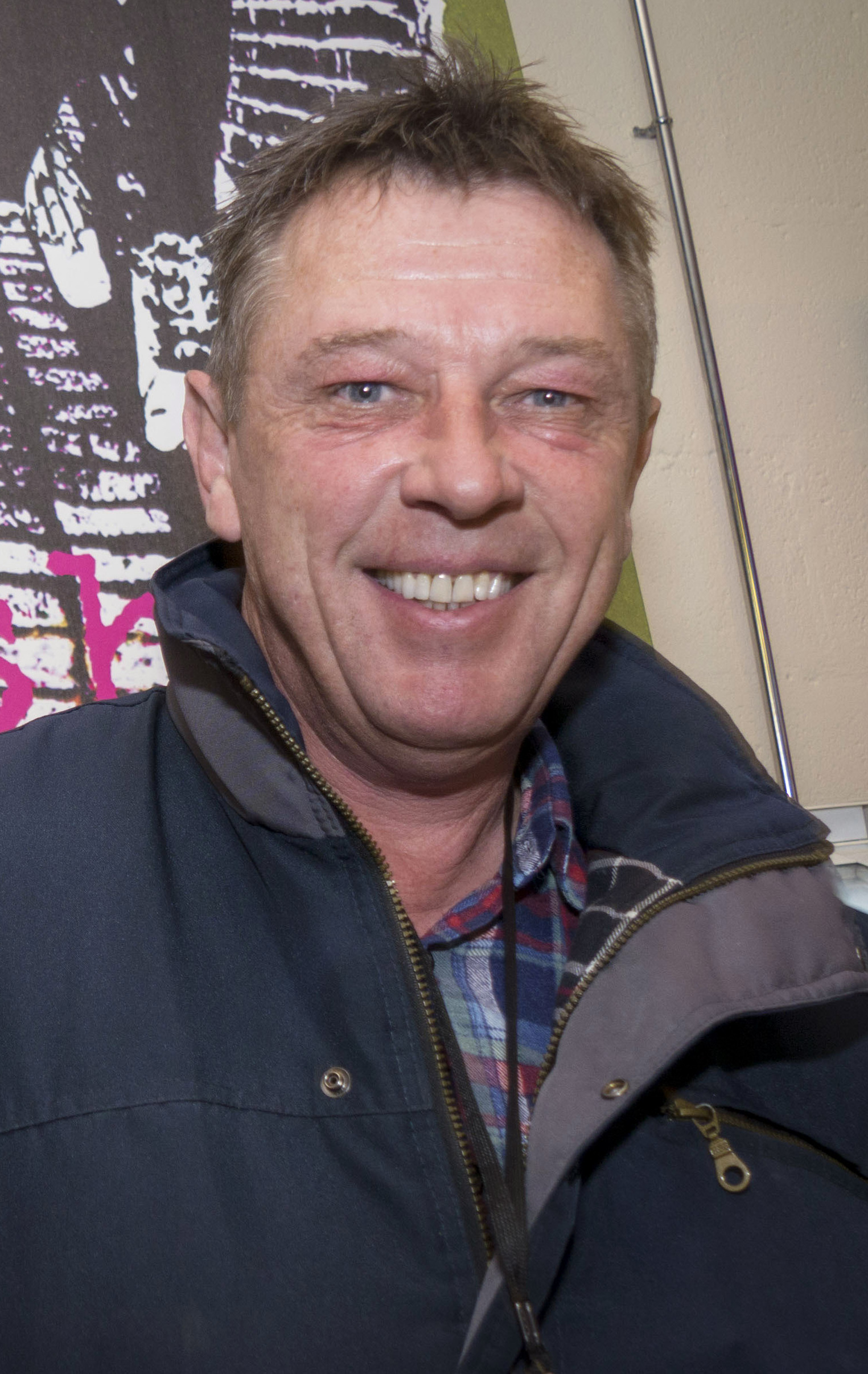
- Kershaw in 2014
- Born: Andrew Kershaw; 9 November 1959; Littleborough, Lancashire, England
- Died: 16 April 2026 (aged 66); Todmorden, West Yorkshire, England
- Occupation: Disc jockey
- Years active: 1981–2026
- Children: 2
- Relatives: Liz Kershaw (sister)
- Website: andykershaw.co.uk

Andrew Kershaw (9 November 1959 – 16 April 2026) was an English broadcaster, radio disc jockey (DJ), and journalist known for his interest in world music. He presented shows on BBC Radio 1 from 1985 until 2000 and co-presented BBC television coverage of the 1985 Live Aid concert.

Kershaw's shows featured a mix of country, blues, reggae, folk music, African music, spoken word performances and a wide variety of other music from around the world.

== Early life and education ==
Andrew Kershaw was born in Littleborough, Greater Manchester, on 9 November 1959, to John "Jack" Kershaw, headmaster of a comprehensive school in Rochdale, and Eileen Kershaw (née Acton), a headmistress of a nursery school in Oldham. His parents instilled in him the ethics of education and self-improvement at an early age. His sister is broadcaster Liz Kershaw.

As a party trick, aged two, he would name the whiskered military men in his father's history books of the First World War, but he never felt the love or pride from his parents that he received from his grandparents, who provided a home away from home.

Kershaw was educated at Hulme Grammar School in Oldham where he took A-levels in History, Economics, and Spanish. He left the Economics examination halfway into the allotted time, in order to attend a Bob Dylan concert, but still achieved a Grade A in the subject. He then studied politics at the University of Leeds, from which he failed to graduate; his decision to apply for a place there had been solely with an eye on the position of Entertainments Secretary for Leeds University Union.

Kershaw was elected Entertainments Secretary in 1980, midway through his second year; this was a full-time commitment to a non-sabbatical office. He booked bands including Ian Dury, Dire Straits, the Clash, Elvis Costello, Iggy Pop and Duran Duran – the last of whom were paid £50 from Kershaw's pocket to be a support act for Hazel O'Connor.

== Career ==
=== Early career ===
Kershaw's first engagement after the University of Leeds was to oversee backstage operations of the Rolling Stones' 1982 Roundhay Park concert in Leeds.

=== Music broadcasting ===
Kershaw began work for Radio Aire as Promotions Manager, a position he used – with station presenter Martin Kelner – to ruthlessly promote the UK's third-largest town without city status, Northampton. Unintentionally, at Radio Aire, he helped to launch the media career of Carol Vorderman, and made his broadcasting debut, fronting a late-night alternative show and a weekly blues programme. After being made redundant from Radio Aire in 1983, Kershaw was employed as a driver and roadie by the singer Billy Bragg.

His big break came in 1984, when he was asked to present BBC TV's flagship rock programme, Whistle Test, by its producer Trevor Dann, whom Kershaw had met when filming with Bragg the previous week. He subsequently recorded a television interview with his hero Bob Dylan, and a loud session from the Ramones. He co-presented BBC television coverage of Live Aid in 1985. In July 1985, Kershaw began work as a BBC Radio 1 DJ, earmarked by the station as a possible successor to John Peel. Room 318 of Egton House was to house Kershaw, Peel, and their mentor, producer John Walters, whose Reithian motto was, "We're not here to give the public what it wants. We're here to give the public what it didn't know it wanted." His weekly Radio 1 shows were characterised by their high levels of enthusiasm and musical eclecticism.

Kershaw's "boredom" with Anglo-American rock led him to seek out sounds from further afield, especially Africa. Fellow DJ Charlie Gillett introduced him to Stern's African Records shop in London, and Lucy Durán exposed him to musicians like Youssou N'Dour and Toumani Diabaté, playing impromptu sessions in her London front room. Peel and Kershaw discovered Zimbabwe's Bhundu Boys simultaneously; the band began to feature heavily on their playlists. The Bhundus' singer Biggie Tembo became Kershaw's great friend.

This first year of broadcasting won Kershaw his first gold Sony Award in 1987. Kershaw was the first to play Ali Farka Touré on mainstream national radio, and the documentary they made together in Mali was the first ever to be broadcast simultaneously on Radios 1 and 4.

Kershaw's contract with Radio 1 ended in the year 2000. His last months on the network featured sessions by Willie Nelson, Warren Zevon and Lou Reed. He then worked at BBC Radio 3 the following year, where he soon completed a musical tour of the so-called Axis of Evil: Iraq, North Korea and Iran.

From July 2007, Kershaw was absent from his BBC Radio 3 show for an extended period, returning in 2011 with Music Planet, co-hosted with Lucy Durán. He returned on air to BBC Radio 3 in September 2020, presenting a two episode Sunday feature, The Kershaw Tapes.

=== Broadcast journalism ===
Kershaw worked as a journalist for BBC Radio 4's From Our Own Correspondent, the Today programme and The World Tonight. He reported from the 1994 Rwanda's genocide, Angola's civil war in 1996, Sierra Leone in 2001 and repeatedly from Haiti. Kershaw covered the 2010 Red Shirt Revolution in Bangkok for The Independent.

In Ghosts of Electricity, a 1998 documentary he made for Radio 1, Kershaw tracked down and unmasked, 32 years after the event, the heckler who shouted "Judas!" at Bob Dylan in 1966. In June 2005, Kershaw criticised Bob Geldof over the choice of artists who were due to play at Live 8, which included few black performers and even fewer Africans. Kershaw put together two compilations, Great Moments of Vinyl History (1988) and More Great Moments of Vinyl History (2004), which documented his wide musical taste.

=== Writing ===
Kershaw's autobiography, No Off Switch, was published in July 2011 by Serpent's Tail (later republished by Buster Press) and was praised by Stephen Fry among others. It received a negative review from Rachel Cooke in The Guardian, who said: "He is always right, and those who disagree are always stupid."

== Personal life and death ==
Kershaw had a 17-year relationship with the mother of his two children, a son and a daughter. They moved to the Isle of Man, where the relationship broke down; he repeatedly harassed her. In October 2007, he was convicted of breaching a restraining order which required him not to contact her, and of driving under the influence, Subsequently, in January 2008, he was sentenced to three months' imprisonment for repeatedly violating this order. He was arrested a few days after his release, and at the end of that year he was given a six-month suspended sentence.

A much-advertised BBC Radio 4 interview with him, On the Ropes, was cancelled the day before transmission in April 2009 "over fears it would impinge on the privacy of his former girlfriend and their children". In August 2010, he was due to return to work at the BBC.

Kershaw's cancer diagnosis was revealed in January 2026. He died in his hometown of Todmorden on 16 April 2026, aged 66.

Kershaw's private funeral and a "memorial gig" at Leeds University, took place in May 2026. The memorial gig included eulogies from family and friends, as well as a video-link of a performance by Loudon Wainwright III who, over the course of 19 years, had recorded more than 60 live tracks for Kershaw, in eleven separate sessions for BBC radio. Billy Bragg, Martin Carthy, daughter Eliza, Wreckless Eric and others provided song performances or video messages.

== Recognition ==
In July 2003, Kershaw was awarded an honorary doctorate of music by the University of East Anglia, and in 2005, he was similarly honoured by his alma mater, the University of Leeds.

In March 2007, Kershaw appeared on Desert Island Discs, selecting "Hupenyu Hwangu" by Bhundu Boys, the collected works of Ryszard Kapuscinski, and "lots of toilet roll" as his chosen favourite track, book and luxury item respectively.
