= Bhundu Boys =

Zimbabwean musical group which was active from 1983 until 2000

- Origin: Zimbabwe
- Genres: Jit, chimurenga
- Years active: 1983–2000
- Labels: Rugare (Zimbabwe), Discafrique; Mango/Island/PolyGram Records
- Past members: Biggie Tembo (died 1995); Rise Kagona (died 2024); Kenny Chitsvatsva; David Mankaba (died 1991); Shakespear "Shakie" Kangwena (died 1993); Shepherd Munyama (died 1992); Washington Kavhai; Kudaushe Matimba

The Bhundu Boys were a Zimbabwean band that played a mixture of chimurenga music with American rock and roll, disco, country, and pop influences. Their style became known as jit, and is quite popular across Africa, with some international success, and has influenced later groups like Nehoreka and Mokoomba. British world music DJ Andy Kershaw said that at the height of their magical powers they were "...the single most natural, effortless, catchy pop band I've ever heard"; the BBC's John Peel famously broke down in tears the first time he saw the band perform live.

The name came from bhundu (meaning "bush" or "jungle"), in reference to the young boys who used to aid the nationalist guerrilla fighters in the 1970s war against the white minority government of what was then Rhodesia. Lead singer Biggie Tembo (Biggie Rodwell Tembo Marasha) was a Bhundu boy.

== History ==
=== Beginnings ===
The Bhundu Boys recorded their first 7" vinyl single (Une Shuwa Here) at Shed Studios in Harare in August 1982, as part of the Studio's drive to sponsor more local music. They were one of a number of more adventurous bands that had not been contracted by the two record labels. Shed Studios was owned by Steve Roskilly and Martin Norris with engineering by Roskilly, Norris and house drummer, Bothwell Nyamhondera. They signed a formal 3 year recording contract with the studio in February 1983. A single was released on Shed Studio's own Rugare Label almost every month, so as to build up a momentum and strong following. Between 1982 and 1986, The Bhundu Boys thus reached the top of the Zimbabwean music scene, with four number one hits ("Baba Munini Francis", "Wenhamo Haaneti", "Hatisitose", and "Tsvimbodzemoto").

=== Success in the UK ===
They attracted the attention of Owen Elias and his colleague, musician Champion Doug Veitch, who released an EP on their Discafrique label in the UK under licence from Shed Studios in 1985. This attracted the attention of DJ's John Peel and Andy Kershaw who promoted the band on BBC Radio. In September 1985 the Studio gave notice to extend the contract for a further 3 years and the band continued to record. Given the attention of Peel and Kershaw, under further licence from Shed Studios, their first UK album, Shabhini, was released on the Discafrique label in 1986. This was a compilation of music already released in Zimbabwe.

The band travelled to UK in 1986 for a live tour organised by Elias, and Scottish graphic artist Gordon Muir became their manager. After touring the UK for a year, basing themselves initially in Hawick, Scotland with Muir and travelling relentlessly, the band appeared to be on the brink of a major commercial breakthrough. They were feted by Eric Clapton and Elvis Costello and Madonna asked them to be her support act at Wembley Stadium in 1987.

In October 1986, just as the band's second UK album Tsvimbodzemoto was about to be released in UK, on the Discafrique label by Elias, they met with Roskilly and requested that their Shed Studios contract be terminated early as manager Muir wanted to sign them to Warner Bros. Records. This was a monumental blow to the Studios and to Roskilly their erstwhile producer, in particular. It was however agreed that the contract would be nullified in return for all rights associated with existing Shed recordings, being assigned to the Studio’s publisher Shed Music, in perpetuity. In practice, Shed Music continued to pay writer's publishing royalties. Controversially, much of their £80,000 advance from WEA was spent buying a house in Kensal Rise, West London that as of 2006 was still a source of dispute. The band played in North America, Australia and Hong Kong. But the first WEA album True Jit, produced by Robin Millar, was considered too far a jump in style from their original Shed Studios' recordings (produced by Steve Roskilly) and was unfavourably received.

=== Downfall and breakup ===
The band began a long period of further live appearances, releasing other independent CDs, but started to fall apart. They were dropped from WEA after the commercial failure of their second album on the label. Leader Biggie Tembo achieved some celebrity on TV and in the press, which irritated the rest of the band, especially guitarist Rise Kagona, and Tembo was asked to leave the band in 1990 following an altercation at Harare airport. The band continued but without the writing and vocal talents of Tembo, the band never again produced the same reception by the music press or by the public.

Three members died of complications from AIDS: David Mankaba (d. 1991), his replacement Shepherd Munyama (d. 1992) and Shakespear Kangwena (d. 1993).

Tembo tried a comeback by collaborating with a Bristol band, Startled Insects, without success. Returning to Zimbabwe in the early 1990s, he tried to self-produce some more music at Shed Studios including two albums (Baba of Jit and Out of Africa). Time in the studio for these albums were not paid for and Shed Studios didn’t complete final mixes. As a result neither album was properly released or published. Tembo became ill with depression, became a practising Christian, eventually hanging himself in a psychiatric hospital in 1995, where he had been sectioned for violent outbursts.

Meanwhile, the band soldiered on, recording two more albums. Muir left their management in difficult circumstances as the band's income dried up. In 1996 he sold the band's house in Mortimer Road, Kensal Rise, as part of winding up the band's assets, with surviving band members reporting they received almost nothing from the deal; they suspect that Muir had actually used the band's money to buy it in the first place, using their Warner advance without permission. Muir has countered that there were no profits to divide up. The band finally called it quits in 2000 after bassist Washington Kavhai was jailed in the UK on an aggravated assault conviction.

In 2001, Shed Studios issued a compilation album of all the Bhundu Boys recordings made in Zimbabwe, entitled The Shed Sessions, for release in UK on a double CD, under licence to Gordon Muir. The CD continues to sell and is also available to stream on iTunes and Spotify.

=== Current whereabouts ===
Guitarist Rise Kagona was divorced and went to live in Scotland. He wrote a short account of the band's history. He played in Rise Kagona and the Jit Jive Band, who frequently performed in northern England and Scotland. He co-wrote and sang on "She Told You So" on Ben Avison's 2013 Good Day Mr. Magpie album. He also played with Doug Veitch, recording an album, Tanzwa Nekutambura, in 2007. Rise Kagona died following a long illness in Scotland on September 17, 2024, aged 62.

Kuda Matimba lived in London as of 2007, playing with Harare, a group he started in 2005 together with Kenny Chitsvatsva. He had lost contact with Rise Kagona.

Moyo Tembo, son of Biggie Tembo, formed a group called The Chinhoyi Superstars, who released their debut single "Woiteyiko".

Biggie Tembo Jr., a second son of Biggie Tembo, has followed in his father's footsteps and released his debut album, Rwendo, in 2010. He was convicted of assault against a woman in 2015.

As of 2024 Kenny Chitsvatsva was the only surviving original member of the band. He had been working as a minicab driver in London in 2018. In 2021, Chitsvatsva teamed up with sungura musician Liversay Matamba to record a COVID-19-themed song.

== Discography ==
Shed Studios release in Zimbabwe - Engineered Bothwell Nyamhondera

- Une Shuwa Here (Rugare, 1982)
- Kuroja Chete (Rugare, 1983)

Shed Studios release in Zimbabwe - Produced and engineered Stephen Roskilly

- Kumbirayi (Rugare, 1983)
- Zvichatinetsa (Rugare, 1983)
- Pachedu (Rugare, 1983)
- Chekudya Chose (Rugare, 1983)
- Nhai Mukoma (Rugare, 1983)
- Hupenyu Hwangu (Rugare, 1983)
- Faka Puresha (Rugare, 1984)
- Wakandiparadzisa Musha (Rugare 1984)
- Shabhini (Rugare 1984)
- Ziva Kwawakabva (Rugare 1984)
- Ndipo Mari Yangu (Rugare 1984)
- Wakasikitei Satani (Rugare 1984)
- Dai Ndakaziva (Rugare, 1984)
- Wehamo Haaneti (Rugare, 1984)
- Zvandinetsa (Rugare, 1984)
- Pendeke (Rugare 1984)
- Hatisitose (Rugare 1984)
- Vakaparei (Rugare, 1984)
- Baba Munini Francis (Rugare, 1984)
- Wafungeyiko (Rugare 1984)
- Tsvimbodzemoto (Rugare 1985)
- Manhenga (Rugare 1985)
- Simbimbino (Rugare 1985)
- Kupedza Muto (Rugare 1985)
- Chimanimani (Rugare 1985)
- Zvandinetsa (Rugare 1986)
- Muchihwa (Rugare 1986)

Discafrique release in UK under licence from Shed Studios

- Shabini (DiscAfrique, Afril02, 1986)
- Tsvimbodzemoto (DiscAfrique, Afrilp03, 1987)

Warner Brothers release in UK

- True Jit (WEA 242203-2, 1987)
- Pamberi (WEA, 1989)

Independent releases in UK

- Live at King Tut's Wah Wah Hut (DiscAfrique, Afrilp007, 1990)
- Friends on the Road (Cooking Vinyl, 1993) Featuring: Latin Quarter and Hank Wangford
- Muchiyedza (Cooking Vinyl 1997)

Gordon Muir release in UK under licence from Shed Studios

- The Shed Sessions (Sadza, 2001)

Contributing artist

- The Rough Guide to the Music of Zimbabwe (World Music Network, 1996)

== Personnel ==
- Kenny Chitsvatsva - drums, lead and backing vocals
- David Mankaba - bass guitar, Lead and backing vocals (died 1991)
- Rise Kagona - guitar, lead and backing vocals (died 2024)
- Biggie Tembo - guitar, lead and backing vocals (died 1995)
- Shakespear ("Shakie") Kangwena - keyboard, lead and backing vocals (died 1993)
- Shepherd Munyama, bass guitar, replaced David Mankaba (died 1992)
- Washington Kavhai, bass guitar, vocals, replaced Shepherd
- Kuda Matimba, keyboard, vocals, replaced Shakie
