= IYASA =

Arts Institution from Bulawayo, Zimbabwe

Inkululeko Yabatsha School of Arts (IYASA)
- Origin: Bulawayo, Zimbabwe
- Genres: Music/Theatre/Dance
- Years active: 2001
- Website: www.iyasa.co.zw

Inkululeko Yabatsha School of Arts, a combination of Ndebele and English phrase which means Freedom of the Youth, officially known as IYASA, is a Zimbabwean arts institution which is based in Bulawayo, the second capital city of Zimbabwe.

FORMATION

IYASA was established in 2001 by Nkululeko Innocent Dube. It started as a drama creative group at Mpopoma High School in Bulwayo. It then advanced into a professional platform for young people who have interest in Arts and Culture in 2001.

== Awards and recognition ==
IYASA has toured many countries including Czech Republic, France, Spain, Australia and Austria. In 2013, three of the group members, Noma Mkhwananzi, Silethemba Magonya, and Pespise Magonya appeared on New York Billboards.

In 2013 IYASA was nominated for the Belgian Young Audiences Musical Awards (YAMA) for their play, “Sleep well, Sweet Moon .”

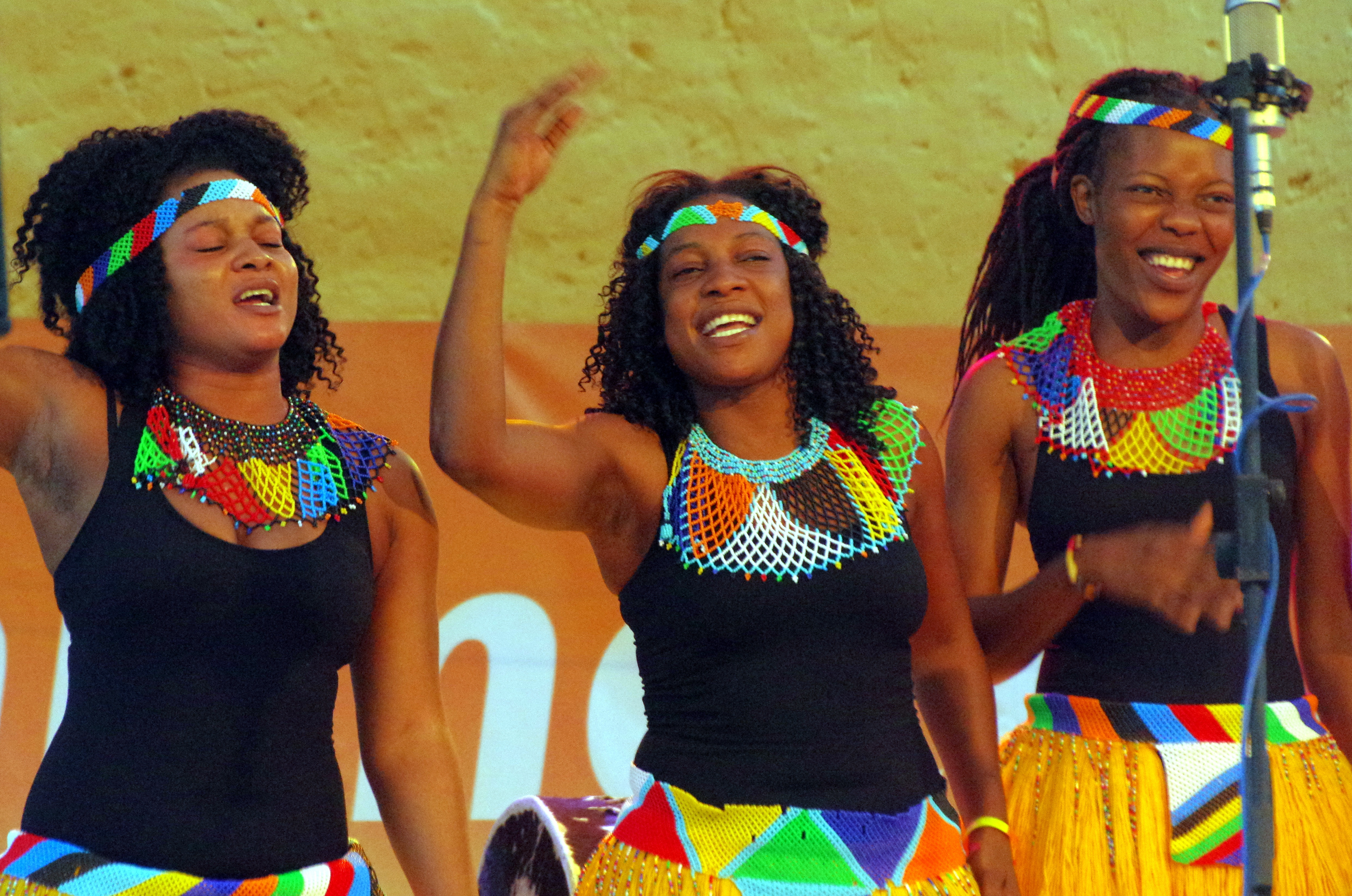
IYASA at Borovany in Czech Republic

IYASA has won five NAMA Awards. These awards include Best Dance Group (3 times), Video of the Year Award and People's Choice Dance Group Award. They also won the International Ambassadors Award (Czech Republic). Furthermore, they won Best Dance Group and Video of the Year Award, conferred by the Zimbabwe Music Awards (ZIMA)
