= Soundscape SSHDR1 =

The Soundscape SSHDR1 (1993 - 1996) was one of the first Windows based digital audio workstations available and was manufactured by Soundscape Digital Technology Ltd..

The system consisted of an external 2U rack unit which housed the audio processing hardware, based on Motorola 56000 family DSPs, 2 inputs and 4 outputs in both unbalanced analogue and S/PDIF digital and two IDE hard disk drives. Synchronisation was via MIDI in/out/thru via MIDI Timecode and an optional I/O board provided balanced analogue and AES/EBU connections. Each unit could record and play 4 tracks of 16bit 48kHz audio but later software upgrades increase this to 8 tracks.

The unit connected to an ISA card fitted into a PC expansion slot, each of which could host 2 x SSHDR1 units. Multiple host cards could be used.

Windows software (for Windows 3.1, 95/98/ME, 2000, XP) controlled the unit and provided 256 virtual tracks, mixing and editing.

Up to 16 units could be used simultaneously, with full sample accurate synchronisation, controlled by one Soundscape editing application.

In 1995 an optional DSP board added a configurable mixer with real-time DSP plugins, an extra 8 in/out via a TDIF port and allowed the unit to record 10 or playback 12 tracks simultaneously at up to 24bit 48kHz. The card could be retro-fitted into any unit.

Optional software packages for Auto-Conforming (for film and TV post-production use) and CD Mastering were available as well as a selection of plug-in effects developed by well known companies such as TC Electronics and Dolby.
