= Rise Up (conference) =

Annual Catholic Christian Outreach conference

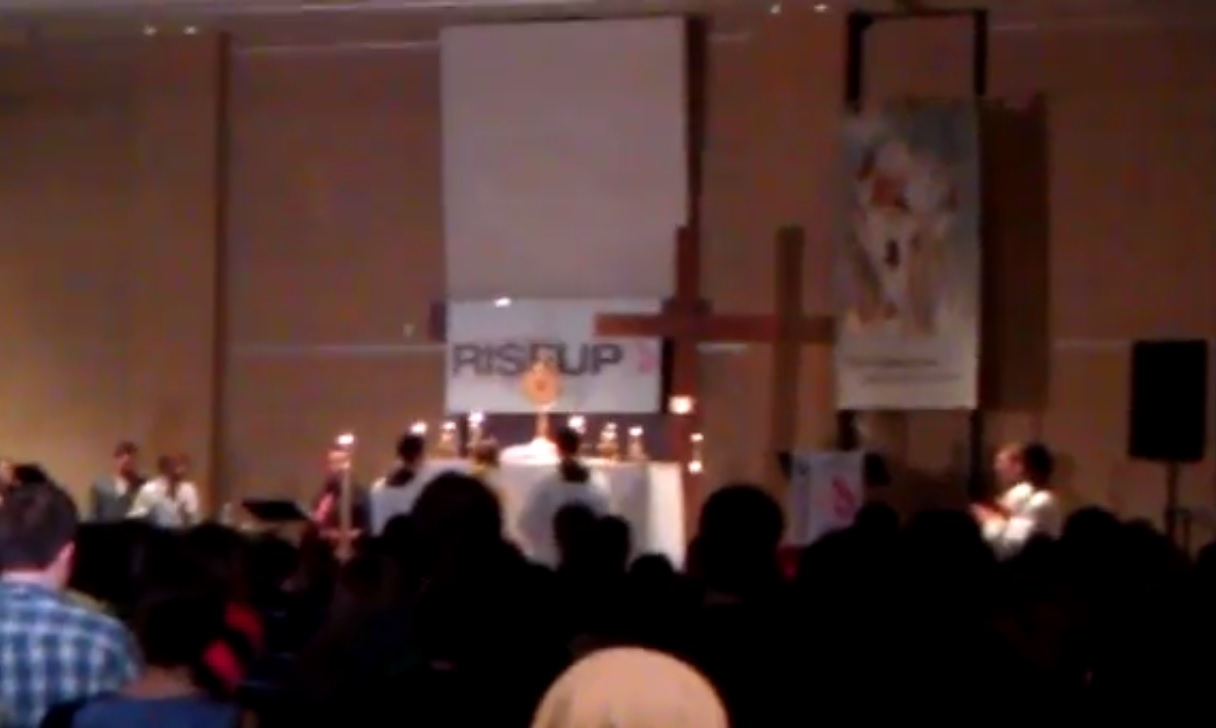
Eucharistic adoration at Rise Up 2011

Rise Up is an annual conference run by Catholic Christian Outreach. It is the second-largest Catholic conference for youth in Canada (behind Steubenville Toronto), and drew 1300 participants to the 2019 five-day conference in Toronto. In 2018, the conference attracted delegates from 79 of Canada's 96 universities.

Rise Up takes place annually from December 29 to January 1. It includes presentations, workshops, mass, live worship, adoration, reconciliation, and a New Year's banquet and dance. It is designed to deepen students' spiritual lives and to motivate them to share the faith with others.

== Locations ==
Rise Up takes place in a different Canadian city each year.

Rise Up Locations
Year	City	Theme
2000	Vancouver, British Columbia	
2001	Ottawa, Ontario	
2002	Edmonton, Alberta	World Youth Day: A Call to Respond
2003	Saskatoon, Saskatchewan	Next Generation Leaders
2004	Toronto, Ontario	Apostles for the New Millennium: Igniting the JPII Generation
2005	Vancouver, British Columbia	The Cry of the Gospel
2006	Quebec City, Quebec	Jesus: Our Heritage and our Hope
2007	Calgary, Alberta	Renaissance of Hope
2008	Toronto, Ontario	Jesus: Yesterday, Today, and Forever (Hebrews 13:8)
2009	Winnipeg, Manitoba	The Word became flesh and dwelt among us (John 1:14)
2010	Montreal, Quebec	I am only a man, just like you
2011	Vancouver, British Columbia	JPII: Inspired by his legacy
2012	Saskatoon, Saskatchewan and Halifax, Nova Scotia	Fiat: A Yes can Change the World
2013	Ottawa, Ontario	All that matters... (Phil 1:18)
2014	Calgary, Alberta	Revive This Generation
2015	Montreal, Quebec	Made for Greatness
2016	Vancouver, British Columbia	Called by Name (Isaiah 49)
2017	Ottawa, Ontario	Dominion from Sea to Sea
2018	Calgary, Alberta	Come and See (John 1:39)
2019	Toronto, Ontario	Anchored (Heb 6:19)
2020	Online	Verso l’Alto or “To the Heights”
2023	Ottawa, Ontario	Rise Up
2024	Calgary, Alberta	Take Courage
2025	Montreal, Quebec	A New Generation
