= Chimurenga =

Shona word meaning "struggle"

Chimurenga is a word in Shona. The Ndebele equivalent is not as widely used since most Zimbabweans speak Shona; it is Umvukela, meaning "revolutionary struggle" or uprising. In specific historical terms, it also refers to the Ndebele and the Shona insurrections against administration of the British South Africa Company during the late 1890s, the Ndebeles are said to have been at the forefront of the First Chimurenga—and the war fought between African nationalist guerrillas and the predominantly-white Rhodesian government during the 1960s and the 1970s, the Rhodesian Bush War, or the Second Chimurenga/Imvukela.

The concept is also occasionally used in reference to the land reform programme undertaken by the Zimbabwe government since 2000, which some call the Third Chimurenga. Proponents of land reform regard it as the final phase in what they hold to be the liberation of Zimbabwe by economic and agrarian reforms that are intended to empower indigenous people, despite the economic collapse that soon followed, which some have labelled the "Third Chimurenga" as being the catalyst.

In a modern context, the word may denote a struggle for human rights, political dignity and social justice. The expression is also used in context with modern Zimbabwean music, Chimurenga music.

== Etymology ==
The name Chimurenga is coined from the great ancestor of the now Shona, Venda and Kalanga people. The Nambya people are also a part of this group. Their ancestor was known by the name Murenga Musorowenzou (Head of an Elephant), known by the Venda as Thoho yaNdou and Sholo reZhou. The later two have named their cities after this man while the Shona honoured him by naming their wars of struggle after him.

== First Chimurenga (1896–97) ==
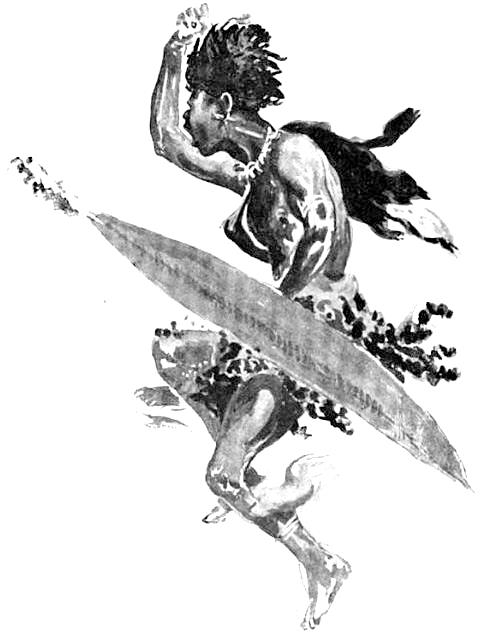
A Ndebele warrior (1896), depicted by Robert Baden-Powell

The First Chimurenga is now celebrated in Zimbabwe as the First War of Independence. It is also known in the English speaking world as the Second Matabele War. This conflict refers to the 1896–1897 Ndebele-Shona revolt against the British South Africa Company's administration of the territory.

Mlimo, the Matabele spiritual/religious leader, is credited with fomenting much of the anger that led to this confrontation. He convinced the Ndebele and Shona that the white settlers (almost 4,000 strong by then) were responsible for the drought, locust plagues and the cattle disease rinderpest ravaging the country at the time. Mlimo's call to battle was well timed. Only a few months earlier, the British South Africa Company's Administrator General for Matabeleland, Leander Starr Jameson, had sent most of his troops and armaments to fight the Transvaal Republic in the ill-fated Jameson Raid. This left the country's defences in disarray. The Ndebele began their revolt in March 1896.

In June 1896, Mashayamombe led the uprising of the Zezuru Shona people located to the South West of the capital Salisbury. Mashayamombe worked with the local spiritual leader Kaguvi, and during this period a white farmer, Norton and his wife were killed at Porta Farm in Norton.

The third phase of the First Chimurenga was joined by the Hwata Dynasty of Mazoe. They succeeded in driving away the white settlers from the Mashonaland on 20 June 1896. Three months later, the British South Africa Police regrouped and established control over the Hwata people after their Mambo (King) Hwata surrendered together with his spirit medium, Nehanda Nyakasikana. Hwata and Nehanda Nyakasikana were sentenced to death and executed.

Mlimo was eventually assassinated in his temple in Matobo Hills by the American scout Frederick Russell Burnham. Upon learning of the death of Mlimo, Cecil Rhodes walked unarmed into the native's stronghold and persuaded the Impi to lay down their arms. The first Chimurenga thus ended in October 1897. Matabeleland and Mashonaland were unified under company rule and named Southern Rhodesia.

== Second Chimurenga (1967–79) ==
The Second Chimurenga, also known as the Rhodesian Bush War or the Zimbabwe Liberation War, refers to the guerrilla war of the 1966–1979 which led to the end of white-minority rule in Rhodesia and to the de jure independence of Zimbabwe. The physical manifestation of the war was as a conflict between the predominantly white minority government, headed by Ian Smith, and the black nationalist movements of ZANU and ZAPU, respectively led by Robert Mugabe and Joshua Nkomo.

== In music ==
Chimurenga also refers to a style of music first branded by Thomas Mapfumo, who mixed indigenous African rhythmic patterns and instruments such as mbira (thumb piano), drums, gourd rattles with Western styles (electric guitar) in songs that achieved wide popularity among the protest movement against white minority rule. Today the term Chimurenga music refers to popular Shona music from Zimbabwe.
