= Chimurenga music =

Zimbabwean popular music genre

Chimurenga
- Stylistic origins: Mbira; electric blues
- Cultural origins: 1970s, Shona people
- Typical instruments: Vocals; electric guitar; bass guitar; drums

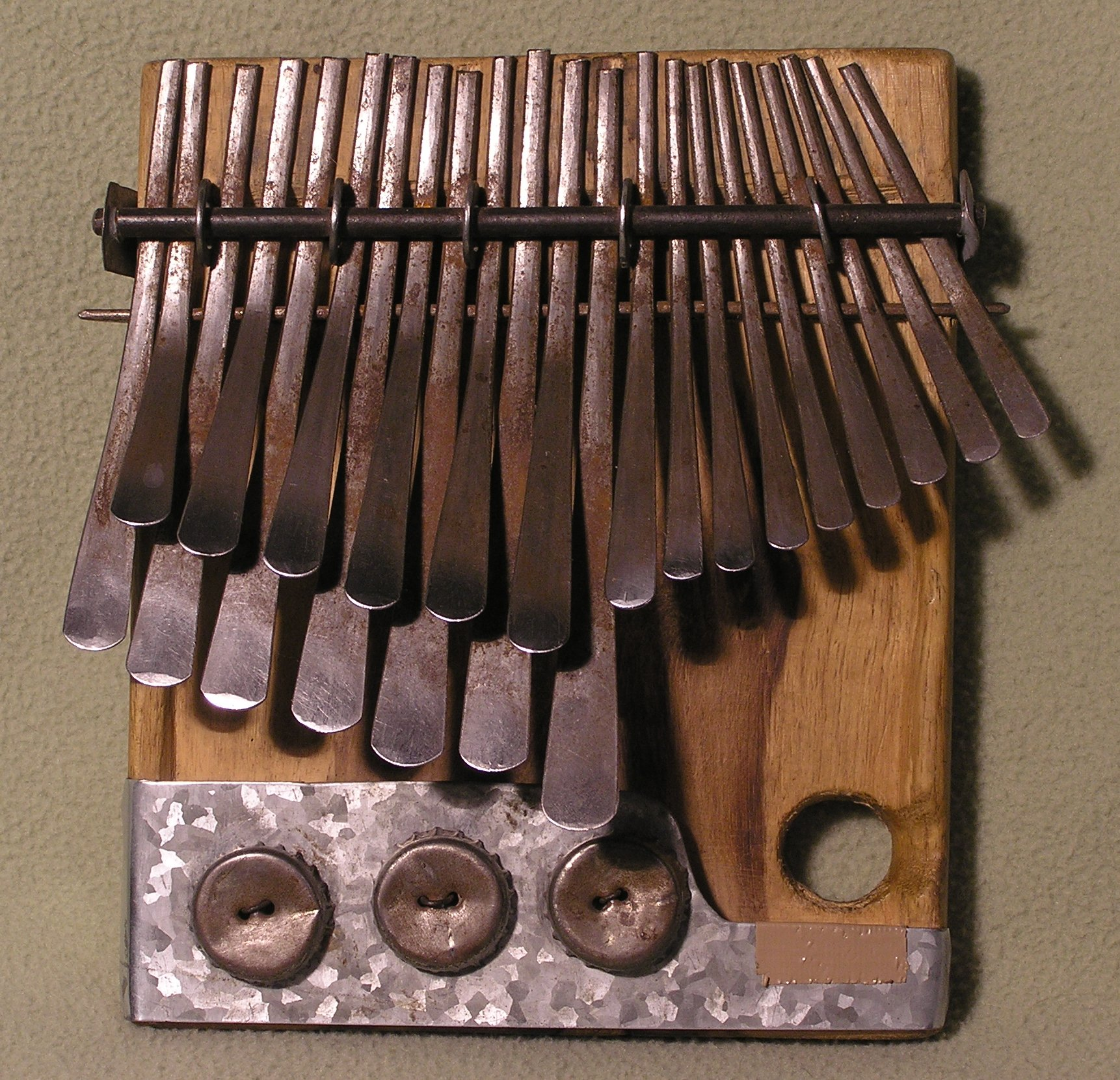
The mbira, a traditional instrument typically used in Chimurenga music

Chimurenga music is a Zimbabwean popular music genre coined and popularized by Thomas Mapfumo. Chimurenga is a Shona-language word for liberation, which entered common use during the Rhodesian Bush War (1964–1979). Mapfumo developed a style of music based on traditional Shona mbira music but played using modern electric instrumentation, with lyrics characterized by social and political commentary.

== Origin ==
The name "Chimurange music" is derived from the Shona-language word chimurenga, meaning "liberation", which was commonly used during the 1964–1979 Rhodesian Bush War. The genre was created by the musician and political dissident Thomas Mapfumo.

== Style ==
An instrument commonly used in chimurenga music is the mbira, a type of "thumb piano" with a wooden body and metal tines that are plucked to produce a sound. Contemporary chimurenga incorporates electric instruments such as bass and electric guitars. It includes percussive elements like hosho shakers and various drums. The music typically builds melodies on top of folk tunes, with a danceable, fast-paced beat. The vocals tend to be emotional and can involve a call-and-response element.
