= ERTT =

Defunct Tunisian state broadcaster

Établissement de la Radiodiffusion-Télévision Tunisienne
- Type: Broadcast radio and television
- Country: Tunisia
- Availability: National; international
- Headquarters: Tunis, Tunisia
- Owner: Government of Tunisia
- Launch date: 7 May 1990; 36 years ago
- Dissolved: 31 August 2007; 18 years ago
- Replaced: Radiodiffusion-télévision tunisienne (1957–1990)
- Replaced by: Radio Tunisienne; Télévision Tunisienne

The Établissement de la Radiodiffusion-Télévision Tunisienne (ERTT) – French for Tunisian Radio and Television Establishment – was Tunisia's state broadcasting organization from 1990 until 2007 before it was split into the Tunisian Television Establishment and the Tunisian Radio Establishment. It operated two national television channels (Télévision Tunisienne 1 and El Wataniya 2) and several radio stations (like Radio Tunis).

ERTT offered services in Tunisian Arabic, Arabic, French, Italian and Turkish.

== History ==
Created by the decree of 25 April 1957, Radiodiffusion-télévision tunisienne (RTT) becomes ERTT by the law of 7 May 1990. It was a shareholder in Euronews, a member of the European Broadcasting Union (EBU) and the African Union of Broadcasting (AUB) and the flagship member of the Arab States Broadcasting Union (ASBU). On 7 November 2006, President Zine el-Abidine Ben Ali announces the split of the establishment into two separate entities: Tunisian Radio Establishment (Arabic: مؤسسة الإذاعة التونسية) and Tunisian Television Establishment (Arabic: مؤسسة التلفزة التونسية). This split becomes effective on 31 August 2007. Both ERTT successor companies are members of the EBU, AUB and ASBU.

In the late 1950s and early 1960s, television made its appearance with the transmission of RAI broadcasts in the northeast of the country. From 1963, certain programs were broadcast by Tunisian public television on an experimental basis or on the occasion of special events. The first test broadcast took place in October 1965, with a program schedule lasting 75 minutes. The following year, regular broadcasts began with the official opening of RTT on May 31, 1966.

Initially, the channel broadcast three hours a day, two hours in Arabic and one hour of French-language programs. In this context, it began developing cooperation with French-speaking television, in particular Télévision Suisse Romande, which provided it with programs and welcomed trainees in its Geneva studios. By 1976, Tunisian television began broadcasting in color, and in June 1983, the channel changed its name to RTT 1, in connection with the establishment of the French-language television channel RTT 2 (a collaboration between Tunisia's RTT and French broadcaster ORTF with programming from La deuxième chaîne (The Second Channel), later Antenne 2 following the breakup of ORTF and now France 2). RTT 2 was closed in 1989 and the following year replaced by Arabic language channel Tunis 2 until 1994 when Canal 21 was launched. French programming from France 2 continued to be aired until the end of October 1999. The two national channels later changed their names several times and are currently El Watania 1 and El Watania 2 since 2011.

== Services ==
=== Television ===
Between 1990 and 2007, ERTT owned two national public television channels:

- RTT became RTT 1 in 1983, TV7 in 1992, Tunis 7 in 1997, Tunisie 7 in 2008 and since 2011, El Watania 1 (also known as Télévision Tunisienne 1)
- Canal 21 became Tunisie 21 in 2007 and since 2011, El Watania 2 (also known as Télévision Tunisienne 2)

Another channel, RTT 2, was managed by RTT and broadcast in French between 1983 and 1989. It was replaced by Tunis 2, also managed by RTT and then by ERTT, which broadcast its Arabic language programming between 1990 and 1994.

=== Radio ===
Until 2007, ERTT owned nine public radio stations (four national and five regional broadcasters).

The national stations were:

- Radio Tunis (also known as Radio Nationale)
- Radio Tunisie Culture
- Radio Jeunes
- Radio Tunis Chaîne Internationale (RTCI)

The regional stations were:

- Radio Sfax
- Radio Monastir
- Radio Gafsa
- Radio Tataouine
- Radio Le Kef

The majority of the programs were in Arabic but some were in French and a very small amount in English, German, Italian and Spanish (exclusively on RTCI).

== See also ==
- Mass media in Tunisia
