= Mass media in Tunisia =

The mass media in Tunisia is an economic sector. Under the authoritarian regimes of Habib Bourguiba, and then Zine El Abidine Ben Ali, it saw periods of liberalization and then challenges, notably due to Tunisian censorship. The 2010-2011 Tunisian protests and the subsequent change in government may bring significant change in this domain.

In 2007, the Tunisian government's Website counted 245 daily newspapers and reviews, grown from 91 in 1987. These are in large part (90%) owned by private groups and individuals, with much of the press dominated by discussion of government matters. On April 29, 2011, the Minister of the Interior announced authorization was granted to 51 new newspapers and reviews published since the beginning of the revolution.

== History ==
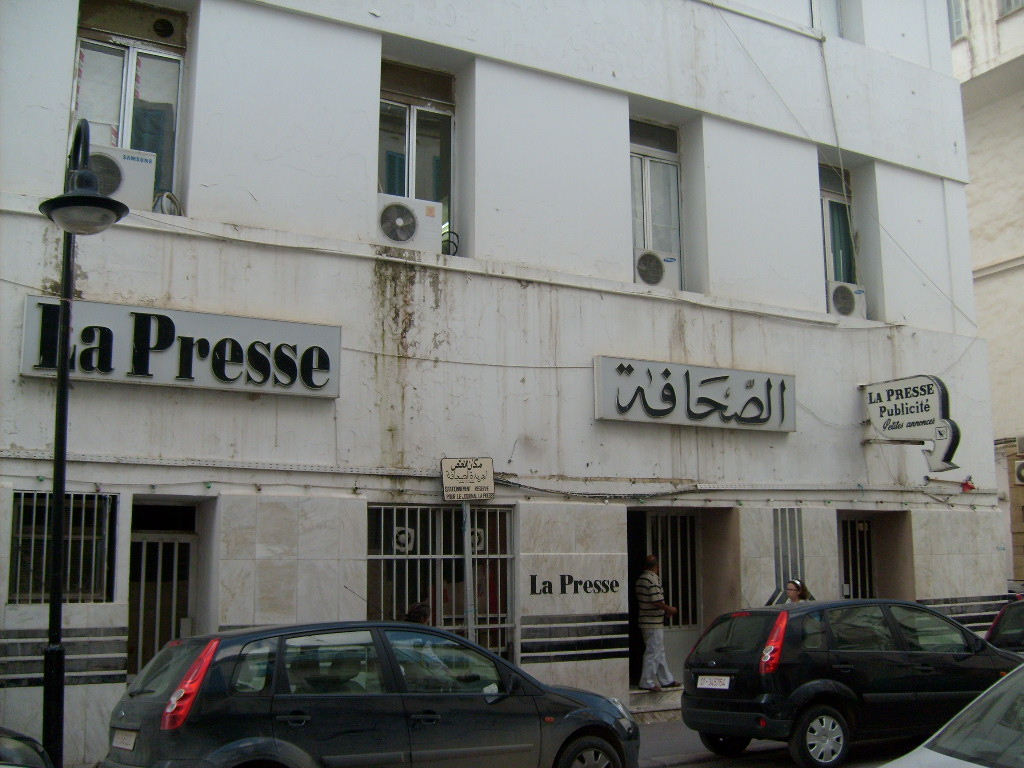
Headquarters of the newspaper La Presse de Tunisie in Tunis

The first newspaper printed in Tunisia appeared on 22 July 1860 as a weekly gazette under the name Arra'id Attunisi (The Tunisian Gazette), founded by Sadok Bey as the official journal of the Beylik of Tunis (later becoming the Journal officiel de la République tunisienne after the proclamation of the republic in 1957). During the French protectorate of Tunisia, anti-Tunisian polemics by the colonial lobby and editor Victor de Carnières prompted the Young Tunisians movement to launch Le Tunisien in February 1907—the first French-language newspaper edited by Tunisians—in order to advocate for reform before protectorate authorities and French public opinion.

Between 1907 and independence in 1956, cumulative registered titles reached 41 in French and 288 in Arabic. At the beginning of 1991, Tunisia had six French-language dailies and nine in Arabic, alongside 140 weeklies (45 in French) and 160 monthly publications.

During the presidency of Zine el-Abidine Ben Ali, political parties were permitted to publish their own newspapers, though opposition outlets appeared only intermittently. In 1991, the government introduced an annual grant of 30,000 Tunisian dinars for each party newspaper, alongside paper and postal subsidies distributed under opaque criteria. A 1999 amendment to the party financing law increased the grant to 120,000 dinars for political party publications and 30,000 dinars for other periodicals, mechanisms that critics noted were used to reward loyal outlets and financially pressure critical newspapers.

Following the 2011 revolution, the lifting of censorship triggered a brief surge in new print titles, but rising paper costs, declining circulation, and competition from online news portals subsequently led to the closure of most independent print newspapers, leaving only a handful of legacy dailies (such as La Presse de Tunisie, Le Temps, Assabah, and Al Chourouk) in regular print circulation.

== Legislation ==
=== Pre-2011 era ===
During the presidency of Zine el-Abidine Ben Ali, the press was governed by the Press Code of 1975 (revised in 1988, 1993, and 2001), which criminalized publications deemed to disturb public order or "defame" state authorities, even when allegations were substantiated. On 27 May 2005, the offence of "defaming public order" and the requirement to deposit copies of newspapers with the Ministry of the Interior prior to publication were abolished.

Despite formal constitutional guarantees of freedom of the press, state-aligned outlets and the official news agency Tunis Afrique Presse largely reflected government positions. A 2000 report by the United Nations Human Rights Committee noted a "uniformity of tone" across Tunisia's 188 registered publications, a characterization acknowledged at the time by Ben Ali and Prime Minister Hamed Karoui. During this period, state-owned publisher SNIPE (publisher of La Presse de Tunisie) dominated public advertising revenues.

=== Post-2011 reforms and Decree-Law 54 ===
Following the 2011 revolution, the transitional government enacted **Decree-Law No. 2011-115** (2 November 2011), replacing the 1975 Press Code, abolishing prior authorization for newspapers, and removing prison sentences for most press offences.

Under the 2022 Constitution and following President Kais Saied's 2021 suspension of parliament, press freedom organizations documented renewed restrictions on media independence, largely through the use of **Decree-Law No. 2022-54** (a September 2022 cybercrime decree penalizing the spread of "false news" with prison terms) rather than the 2011 Press Code. In July 2024, lawyer and media commentator Sonia Dahmani was sentenced under Decree-Law 54 to one year in prison (reduced to eight months on appeal in September 2024) over televised remarks criticizing living conditions and the treatment of migrants in Tunisia, followed by additional prosecutions over comments on racial discrimination and prison conditions.

== Print media ==
=== General publications ===
Title	Founded	Appears	Language	Ownership / Status
Tunisialive	April 2011	Online	English	Independent
Tunis Afrique Presse (TAP)	1 January 1961	Online	Arabic / French / English	State-owned (Official news agency)
African Manager	2000s	Online	Arabic / French / English	Private economic portal
Al Chourouk	1987	Daily (Print / Online)	Arabic	Dar Anwar
Al Anwar	16 August 1981	Weekly (Defunct print)	Arabic	Dar Anwar
Al Moussawar	4 October 1985	Weekly (Defunct print)	Arabic	Dar Anwar
Assabah	1 February 1951	Daily (Print / Online)	Arabic	Dar Assabah
Essahafa	January 1989	Daily	Arabic	SNIPE (State-owned)
Essarih	1995	Defunct (Ceased print 2018)	Arabic	Dar Al Irada
La Presse de Tunisie	12 March 1936	Daily (Print / Online)	French	SNIPE (State-owned)
Le Temps	1 June 1975	Daily (Print / Online)	French	Dar Assabah
Tunis Hebdo	24 September 1973	Defunct weekly	French	Dar Tunis Hebdo
Tunivisions	1997	Monthly / Online	French	Media Visions Editing

=== News magazines ===
Title	Founded	Appears	Language	Ownership
Réalités (Haqaieq)	January 1979	Biweekly / Online	French and Arabic	Maghreb Média
Leaders	2008	Monthly / Online	French and Arabic	Leaders Média

=== Magazines on economic affairs ===
Title	Founded	Appears	Language	Ownership
L'Économiste maghrébin	2 May 1990	Biweekly / Online	French	Promedia
Le Manager	1996	Monthly / Online	French	Private
La Tunisie économique	1985	Defunct monthly	French	UTICA

=== Political and organizational press ===
Title	Founded	Appears	Language	Publisher / Status
Al Mawkif	12 May 1984	Defunct weekly	Arabic	Democratic Progressive Party (PDP)
Al Wahda	10 October 1981	Defunct weekly	Arabic	Popular Unity Party (PUP)
Attariq Al Jadid	7 October 1981	Defunct weekly	Arabic	Ettajdid Movement
Mouwatinoun	15 January 2007	Defunct weekly	Arabic	Democratic Forum for Labour and Liberties (Ettakatol)
Al Fallah	14 May 1993	Weekly / Online	Arabic	Tunisian Union of Agriculture and Fisheries (UTAP)
Al Bayane	14 November 1977	Weekly / Online	Arabic	Tunisian Union of Industry, Trade and Handicrafts (UTICA)
Echaâb	1 May 1959	Weekly / Online	Arabic	Tunisian General Labour Union (UGTT)
Tunis Al Khadhra	20 March 1976	Defunct bimonthly	Arabic	Tunisian Union of Agriculture and Fisheries (UTAP)

=== Specialized and minority-language press ===
- Archives de l'Institut Pasteur de Tunis (medical and microbiology journal, founded 1906; briefly merged with its Algerian counterpart as Archives des Instituts Pasteur de l'Afrique du Nord in 1921–1922)
- Les Cahiers de Tunisie (humanities and social sciences journal, founded 1953)
- Il Corriere di Tunisi (Italian-language community biweekly, founded 1956)
- Revue tunisienne de géographie (geography journal, founded 1978)
- Revue tunisienne de sciences sociales (social sciences journal published by CERES, founded 1964)
- La Tunisie médicale (medical journal, founded 1903)

=== Defunct publications ===
- La Dépêche tunisienne (1889–1961) – French-language colonial daily
- Le Tunisien (1907–1912) – nationalist weekly edited by the Young Tunisians
- Tunis-Socialiste (1921–1956) – French-language organ of the Tunisian Federation of the SFIO
- L'Action tunisienne / El Amal (1932–1988) – nationalist, later Neo Destour and PSD dailies
- Ennasnés (1936–1937) – Arabic-language satirical newspaper
- Erraï (1977–1987) – independent Arabic weekly founded by Hassib Ben Ammar
- Le Renouveau / Al Horria (1988–2011) – French and Arabic daily organs of the Democratic Constitutional Rally (RCD)
- L'Observateur / El Moulahedh (1993–2011) – French and Arabic weeklies published by Dar El Amal
- L'Audace (1994–2007; briefly revived 2011) – opposition journal founded in exile by Slim Bagga
- L'Expression (2007–2009) – French-language weekly

== Plagiarism ==
The institutional Tunisian press is frequently accused by large international newspapers of plagiarism. There have been incidents where print publications have been found to have translated and published material taken from blogs and other online authors, without seeking permission.

== Radio and television ==
Audiovisual media was long under the monopoly of the Établissement de la Radiodiffusion-Télévision Tunisienne (ERTT) and its predecessor, Radiodiffusion-télévision tunisienne (RTT), founded in 1957. On 7 November 2006, President Zine el-Abidine Ben Ali announced the restructuring of the broadcaster, which officially split on 31 August 2007 into two separate public establishments overseeing television and radio respectively.

=== Television ===
The Établissement de la Télévision Tunisienne manages Tunisia's public television channels: El Watania 1, El Watania 2 (which succeeded Canal 21 and the earlier RTT 2), and Watania Sports (launched in March 2026).

Following policy changes in 2003, the sector opened to private broadcasters with the launch of Hannibal TV (2005) and Nessma TV (2007). After the 2011 revolution, the market expanded rapidly under the regulation of the High Independent Authority for Audiovisual Communication (HAICA). While several early post-revolution channels (such as Al-Qalam TV, Tunisia News Network, and TWT) later ceased broadcasting or rebranded, major active private channels include El Hiwar El Tounsi, Attessia TV, Nessma El Jadida, Carthage+, Hannibal TV, Tunisna TV, Telvza TV, M Tunisia (formerly Al-Mutawasit TV), Al Janoubia TV, Al Insen TV, and Jawhara TV.

Television in Tunisia is primarily accessed via free-to-air satellite and digital terrestrial television (TNT).

=== Radio ===
The Établissement de la Radio Tunisienne manages Tunisia's public radio network, consisting of national stations (Radio Nationale, Radio Tunisie Culture, Radio Jeunes, RTCI, and Radio Zitouna, which was founded as a private station in 2007, confiscated by the state in 2011, and formally integrated into the public broadcaster in 2021) as well as regional and thematic stations (Sfax, Monastir, Gafsa, Tataouine, Le Kef, Radio Kasserine, and Radio Panorama).

The majority of radio broadcasts are in Arabic, alongside programming in French and English (notably on RTCI). Private radio began in 2003 with Mosaïque FM, followed before the 2011 revolution by Jawhara FM, Zitouna FM, Express FM, and Shems FM (later confiscated and defunct). Following the 2011 revolution, numerous private commercial and associative stations were licensed across the country, including Radio IFM, Diwan FM, Sabra FM, Cap FM, Ulysse FM, Radio Med, Oasis FM, and Radio Campus Tunis.

== See also ==
- Decree Law 54 (Tunisia)
- Internet in Tunisia
- Telecommunications in Tunisia
- Cinema of Tunisia

== Bibliography ==
- "Tunisia", Freedom of the Press, USA: Freedom House, 2016, OCLC 57509361, archived from the original on 21 March 2019
