= Radio Tunisienne =

National public-service radio network of Tunisia

Coordinates: 36.813333°N 10.179361°E

Établissement de la Radio Tunisienne

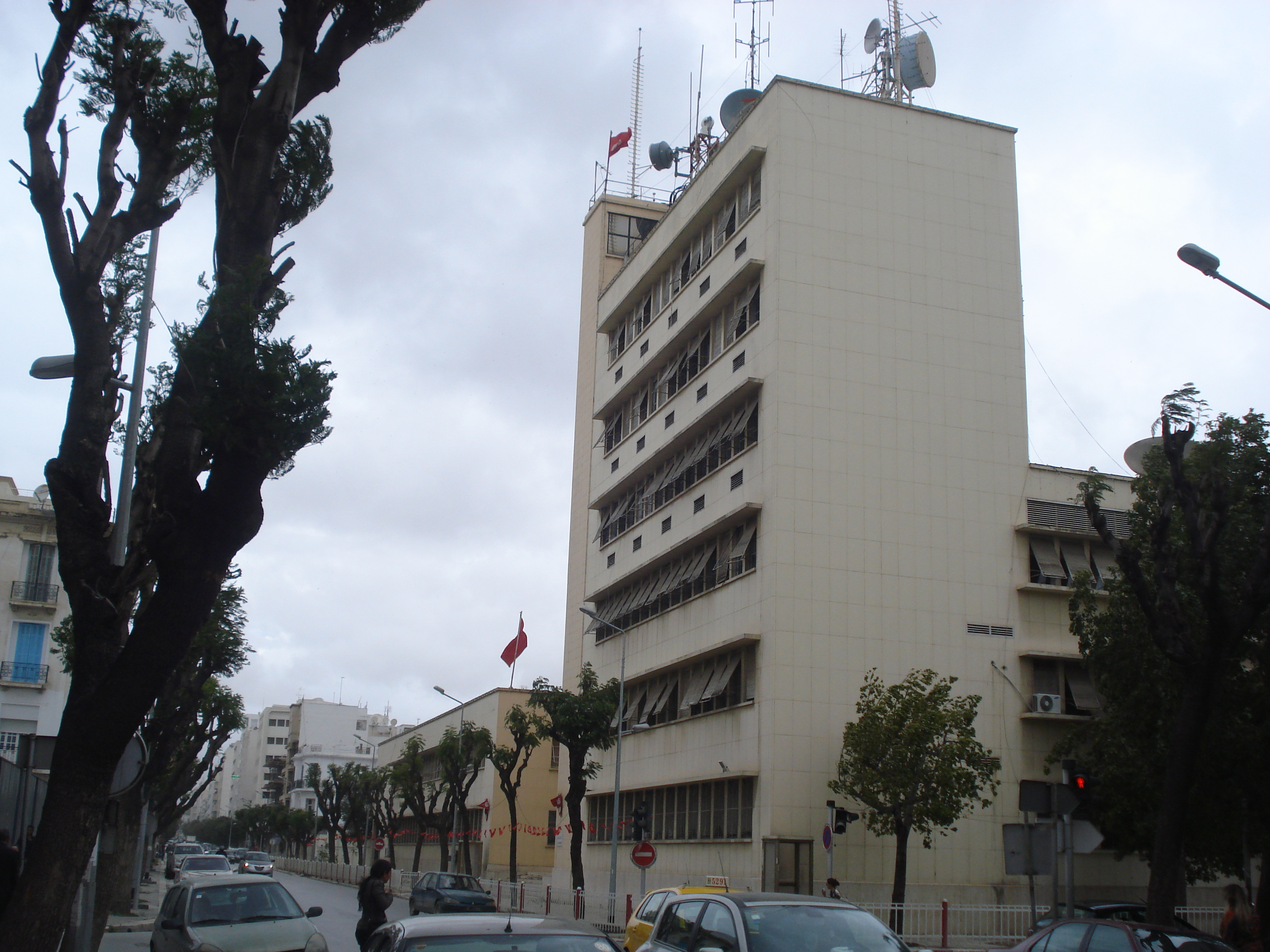
- Radio Tunisienne headquarters in May 2013
- Type: Public-service sound broadcasting
- Country: Tunisia
- Availability: National; international
- Radio stations: Radio Tunis; Radio Tunisie Culture; Radio Jeunes; Radio Panorama; Radio Tunis Chaîne Internationale (RTCI); Radio Sfax; Radio Monastir; Radio Gafsa; Radio Tataouine; Radio Le Kef
- Headquarters: Tunisian Radio House, Lafayette, Tunis
- Owner: Government of Tunisia
- Key people: Chokri Cheniti (interim director)
- Launch date: 31 August 2007; 18 years ago
- Official website: www.radiotunisienne.tn
- Replaced: ERTT

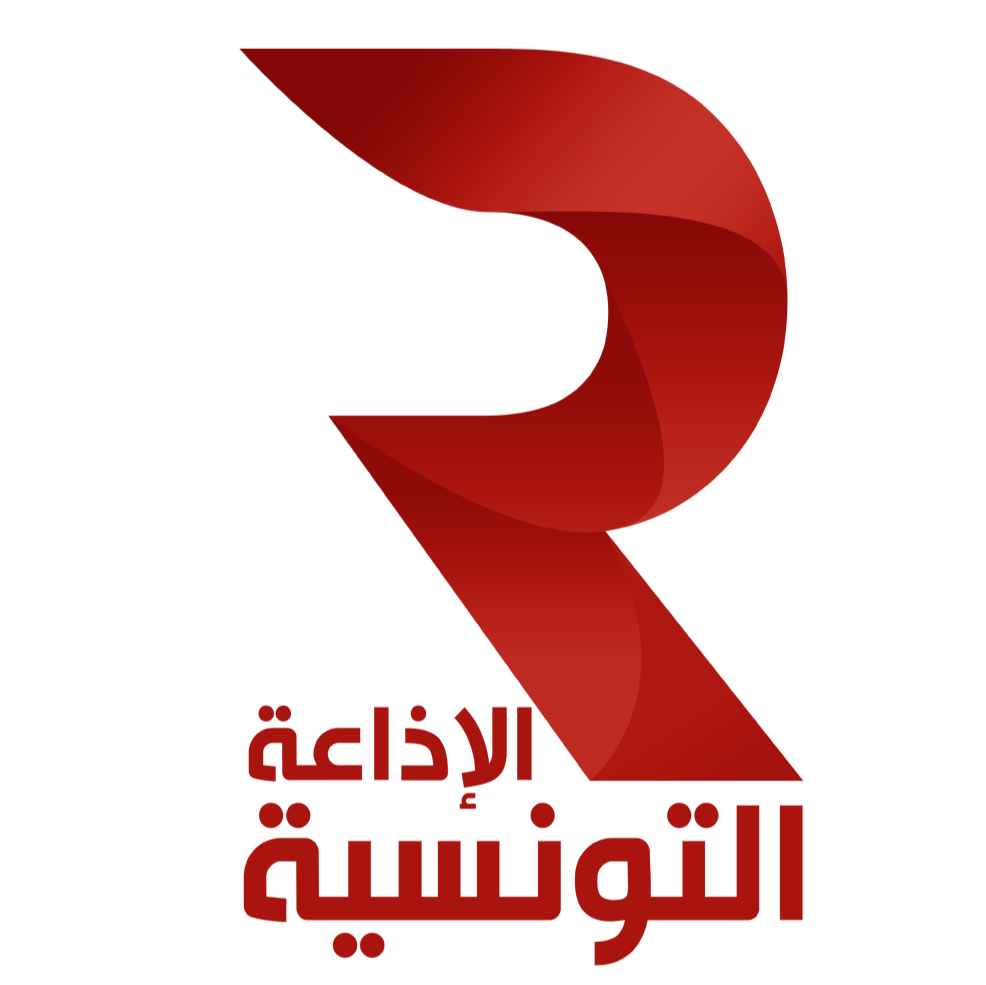
Former logo (2014–2025)

The Établissement de la Radio Tunisienne (RT, French for Establishment of the Tunisian Radio or simply Tunisian Radio; in Arabic: مؤسسة الإذاعة التونسية) is Tunisia's state-owned public radio broadcaster. It was formed in August 2007, when the former national state broadcaster ERTT was split into separate radio and television companies. Tunisian Radio operates ten stations, four nationwide and six regionally. It is an active member of the European Broadcasting Union (EBU) and the Arab States Broadcasting Union (ABSU).

== Background ==
After a few private experiments, Tunisian radio broadcasting began as part of the operation of the French Post and Telegraph Service in 1938. The station was renamed Radio Tunis the following year. The state broadcaster has been organized in several ways since its inception, including under the company Établissement de la Radiodiffusion-Télévision Tunisienne (ERTT) from 1990 to 2007. In November 2006, President Zine El Abidine Ben Ali decided to divide ERTT into two companies: the radio broadcaster Établissement de la Radio Tunisienne and the television broadcaster Établissement de la Télévision Tunisienne. The two companies were formally launched on 31 August 2007. Both ERTT successor companies are members of the EBU, African Union of Broadcasting (AUB) and Arab States Broadcasting Union (ASBU).

In 2009, Tunisian radio launched its first website portal where the company's full list of radio stations are available via streaming. It was later relaunched in the autumn of 2015 in a new guise and with a separate news section. It also has a radio archive of previous recordings, programs and Tunisian music.

Following the Arab Spring in 2011, the Tunisian media, including Radio Tunisienne, have been given more freedom to report and broadcast news and information. Among other things, the country's political opposition has also been allowed to run on state-owned radio and television.

== Stations ==
In 2016, the Tunisian Radio Establishment manages ten public radio channels, four of which are national and the other six are regional stations in El Kef, Gafsa, Monastir, Sfax, Tataouine and Grand Tunis. Radio Tunisienne broadcasts in the FM and medium waves. Shortwave radio broadcasts ended in 2013. Programs and a live stream of all stations can also be listened to online.

=== National ===
- Radio Tunis – the country's oldest Arabic language public station, on air since 15 October 1938
- Radio Jeunes – youth culture station, on air since 7 November 1995
- Radio Tunisie Culture – arts and culture station, on air since 29 May 2006
- Radio Tunis Chaîne Internationale (RTCI) – programs mainly in French, but also in English, German, Italian and Spanish; on air since 15 October 1938 (nationalised in February 1960)

=== Regional ===
- Radio Sfax – broadcasting in the Center and South-East in Arabic since 8 December 1961
- Radio Monastir – broadcasting in the Sahel and Cap Bon in Arabic since 3 August 1977
- Radio Gafsa – broadcasting in the South West in Arabic since 7 November 1991
- Radio Le Kef – broadcasting in the North West in Arabic since 7 November 1991
- Radio Tataouine – broadcasting in the South East in Arabic since 7 November 1993
- Radio Panorama – broadcasting programs produced by the regional stations in Grand Tunis; launched 15 October 2016

== See also ==
- Mass media in Tunisia
