= Arab States Broadcasting Union =

Arab broadcasting organization

- إتحاد إذاعات الدول العربية

- Abbreviation: ASBU
- Formation: February 1969; 57 years ago
- Founded at: Khartoum, Sudan
- Type: Union of broadcasting organisations
- Legal status: Diplomatic Organization
- Headquarters: Tunis, Tunisia
- Region served: Arab World
- Members: 32 active members and 12 associate members
- Official language: Arabic
- Director-General: Abdelrahim Suleiman (2015–)
- Parent organization: League of Arab States
- Website: www.asbu.net

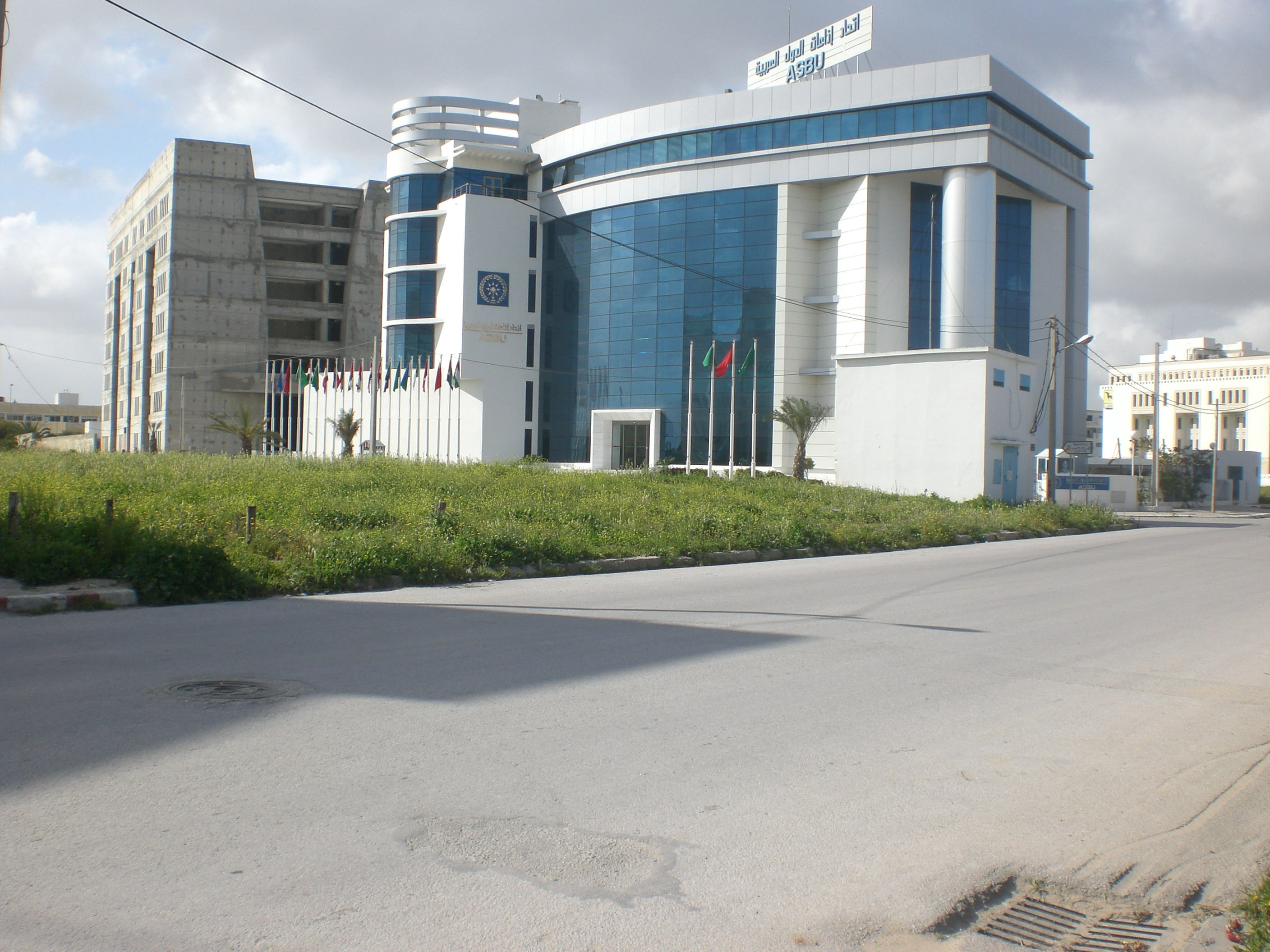
Arab States Broadcasting Union building in Tunis

The Arab States Broadcasting Union (ASBU; Arabic: إتحاد إذاعات الدول العربية) is an Arab joint-action institution related to the League of Arab States and the Pan-Arab Association of Public Service and Commercial Broadcasters. Founded in February 1969 in Khartoum, ASBU is a professional organization with the objective of strengthening ties and promoting cooperation among broadcasters in the Arab States for better production and content development. ASBU provides important services such as engineering and consulting services, radio and television exchange of news, programming and sports, as well as radio and TV training. It also strives to acquire broadcasting rights at preferential rates for a number of competitions and sports events to the benefit of its members, as well as to ensure the appropriate broadcasting coverage of such events.

Its headquarters are in the Tunisian city of Tunis.

== Members ==
ASBU Members

=== Full members ===
Country	Broadcasting organisation	National script/Native Name	Abbr.
Algeria	Public Establishment of Television	المؤسّسة العمومية للتلفزيون, Établissement public de télévision	EPTV
Algeria	National Sound Broadcasting Company	المؤسسة العمومية للبث الإذاعي, Entreprise nationale de radiodiffusion sonore	ENRS
Algeria	Algerian Broadcasting Company	البث الإذاعي والتلفزي الجزائري, Télédiffusion d'Algérie	TDA
Bahrain	Information Affairs Authority	هيئة شؤون الإعلام	IAA
Comoros	Office de Radio et Télévision des Comores	مكتب الإذاعة والتلفزيون بجزر القمر	ORTC
Djibouti	Radio Television of Djibouti	إذاعة وتلفزيون جيبوتي, Radiodiffusion télévision de Djibouti	RTD
Egypt	National Media Authority	الهيئة الوطنية للإعلام	NMA
Iraq	Iraqi Media Network	شبكة الإعلام العراقي	IMN
Jordan	Jordan Radio and Television Corporation	مؤسسة الإذاعة والتلفزيون الأردني	JRTV
Kuwait	Ministry of Information - Kuwait	وزارة الإعلام - الكويت	MOIK
Lebanon	Télé Liban	تلفزيون لبنان	TL
Lebanon	Radio Lebanon	راديو لبنان	RL
Libya	Libya National Channel	قناة ليبيا الوطنية	LNC
Mauritania	Television of Mauritania	التلفزة الموريتانية, Télévision de Mauritanie	TVM
Mauritania	Télédiffusion de Mauritanie		TM
Mauritania	Radio Mauritania	راديو موريتانيا, Radio Mauritanie	RM
Morocco	Société Nationale de Radiodiffusion et de Télévision	الشَرِكَة الوَطَنِيَّة لِلْإِذَاعَة وَالتَلْفَزَة, ⵜⴰⵎⵙⵙⵓⵔⵜ ⵜⴰⵏⴰⵎⵓⵔⵜ ⵏ ⵓⵏⵣⵡⴰⵢ ⴷ ⵜⵉⵍⵉⴼⵉⵣⵢⵓⵏ	SNRT
Palestine	Palestinian Broadcasting Corporation	هيئة الإذاعة والتلفزيون الفلسطينية	PBC
Qatar	Qatar Media Corporation	المؤسسة القطرية للإعلام	QMC
Saudi Arabia	Saudi Broadcasting Authority	هيئة الإذاعة والتلفزيون	SBA
Sudan	Sudan National Broadcasting Corporation	تلفزيون السودان	SNBC
Syria	General Authority for Radio and Television	الهيئة العامة للإذاعة والتلفزيون	GART
Somalia	Somali Radio and Television: Radio Mogadishu; Somali National Television		SRT
Tunisia	Radio tunisienne et Télévision tunisienne: Établissement de la Radio Tunisienne; Établissement de la Télévision Tunisienne	Radio tunisienne et Télévision tunisienne: مؤسسة الإذاعة التونسية); مؤسسة التلفزة التونسية	RTTT
United Arab Emirates	Abu Dhabi Media Network	شبكة أبو ظبي للإعلام	ADMN
United Arab Emirates	Dubai Media Incorporated	مؤسسة دبي للإعلام	DMI
Yemen	Yemen General Corporation for Radio and Television: Yemen Radio; Yemen TV		YGCRT

=== Former members ===
Country	Broadcasting organisation	Abbr.
Libya	Libyan Jamahiriya Broadcasting Corporation	LJBC
Tunisia	Établissement de la Radiodiffusion-Télévision Tunisienne	ERTT

=== Participating members ===
- Al-Manar - Al-Nour (Hezbollah via Lebanese Communication Group)
- beIN Media Group
- Middle East Broadcasting Center
- OSN
- Rotana Media Group

=== Associate members ===
- Addounia TV (Syria)
- Alhurra (Middle East Broadcasting Networks)
- Canal France International
- France 24 (France Médias Monde)
- Hannibal-TV (Tunisia)
- Nessma TV (Tunisia)
- Pakistan Television Corporation
- RNW Media
- RAI (Italy)
- RT (Russia)
- RTVE (Spain)
- Sky News Arabia
- Zayed Radio for Holy Quran (United Arab Emirates)
- CGTN - Arabic Sector

== See also ==
- Arab League
- African Union of Broadcasting
- European Broadcasting Union
- Asia-Pacific Broadcasting Union
