= UTAP =

UTAP may refer to:

- Tunisian Union of Agriculture and Fisheries (Union Tunisienne de l’Agriculture et de la Peche)
- Unmanned Tactical Aerial Platform, as in UTAP-22 variant of Composite Engineering BQM-167 Skeeter
- Utap or Otap, Philippines sweet pastry
