= ORTC =

ORTC may refer to:

- Object Real-time Communications, an object-centric application programming interface for WebRTC
- Ohio River Trail Council, US
- Office de Radio et Télévision des Comores, in the List of radio stations in Africa
