= Nizar Chaari =

Tunisian producer and television host

- نزار الشعري
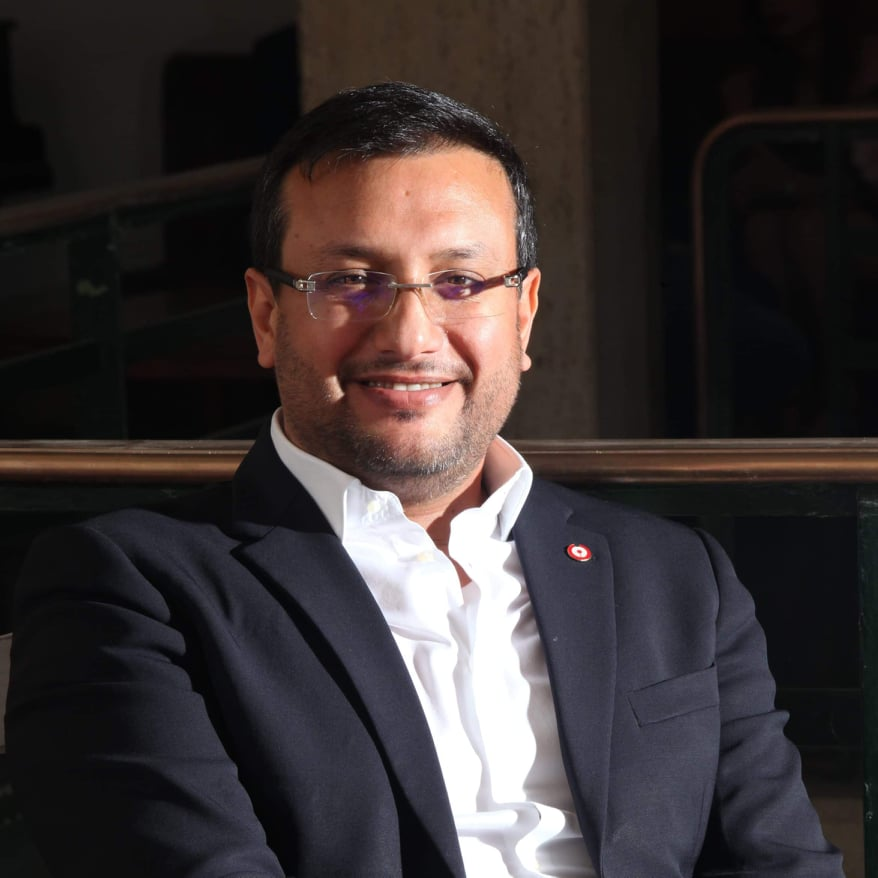
- Chaari in 2020
- Born: 11 June 1977 (age 48); Sfax, Tunisia
- Occupations: Television and radio producer/presenter, politician

Nizar Chaari (Arabic: نزار الشعري; born 11 June 1977) is a Tunisian radio and television presenter, producer and politician. He is best known for his interviews with various Tunisian and Arabic world celebrities, particularly musicians and film/television stars and directors.

== Radio career ==
=== Radio Sfax ===
Chaari began in the media business in 1993 at Radio Sfax, where he spent ten years. In 1997, he launched into production with programs like Zifef El Athir, Marafi El Ahad (news film and theater) and Founoun (theater arts). In 1998, he launched the program Sebii Elfounoun in which he conducted many interviews related to the Carthage Film Festival, including Youssef Chahine, Yahya El Fakharani, Hichem Rostom and Mohamed Zran. From 1999 he also co-produced programs during the summer festivals with interviews with various Tunisian and Arabic world singers.

In 2000, he produced and presented the programs Ithnayn ala Alhawa, Rabii Elfounoun (theater) and Website (internet news). During subsequent seasons, he also produced and presented programs 7 / 7, Binafs al Houdhoudh and Mousica Bilahdoud.

=== Mosaïque FM ===
Between November 2003 and May 2004, he reached a new stage in his career, and moved to the first private radio station Mosaïque FM., becoming the first director of programming for the station on November 7, 2003.

He produces and presents Ala kol Elsen, Monday to Friday at 12:00, with many guests and news from around the world, and Saturday Star with correspondents in Canada, New York City, Paris, Dubai and Cairo.

== Television career ==
=== Canal 21 ===
Parallel with his radio career in 2003, he was hired by Canal 21 and became correspondent in Sfax. He produced and then presented Chat Rhythm addressing the news of festivals and arts. Introducing Youth Interviews also, he did prime time work for Dima 21 from Sunday to Friday. In 2007 he presented Knet 21.

=== Tunisie 7 ===
In July 2004, he joined the main public channel Tunisie 7, hand joined Nismet Sbeh on the morning show on Tuesdays, Thursdays and Saturdays. During that same year he also presented the closing ceremony of the cinematographic Days of Carthage and co-presented the October 24, 2004 presidential elections and TV Hope.

In 2005 and 2007, he presented the Festival of Tunisian Music as well as the opening of the Arab Festival of Television and Radio in 2005. On February 11, 2008, he started a new game show, a Tunisian version of Family Feud entitled Ahna Hakka.

In 2004, he also began writing a weekly column in Le Renouveau (The Daily Renewal) under the title of Star News.

== Personal life ==
Chaari married in September 2007 with Dora Miled, daughter of Aziz Miled, a rich businessman in Tunisia . Their marriage took place at the Essaada de la Marsa palace in La Marsa, a town near Tunis. He has received several awards including the title of best host in Tunisia (2005) and the insignia of the Order of National Merit from the Ministry of Culture of Tunisia (June 28, 2008).
