= Télévision Tunisienne =

Tunisia's national state-owned public service television broadcaster

Coordinates: 36.828167°N 10.158431°E

Établissement de la Télévision Tunisienne
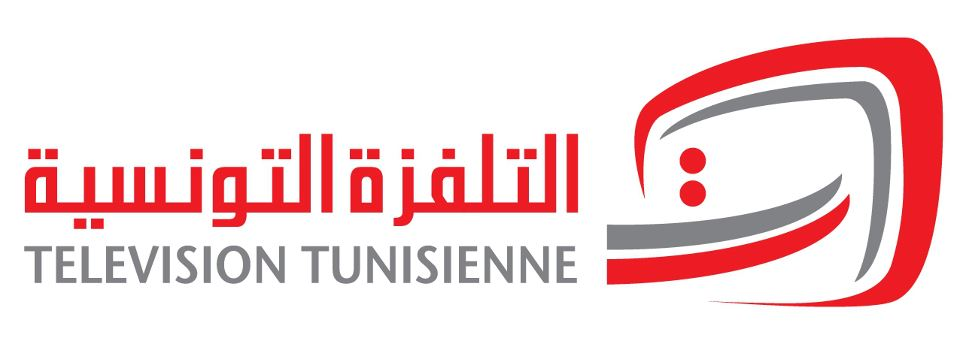

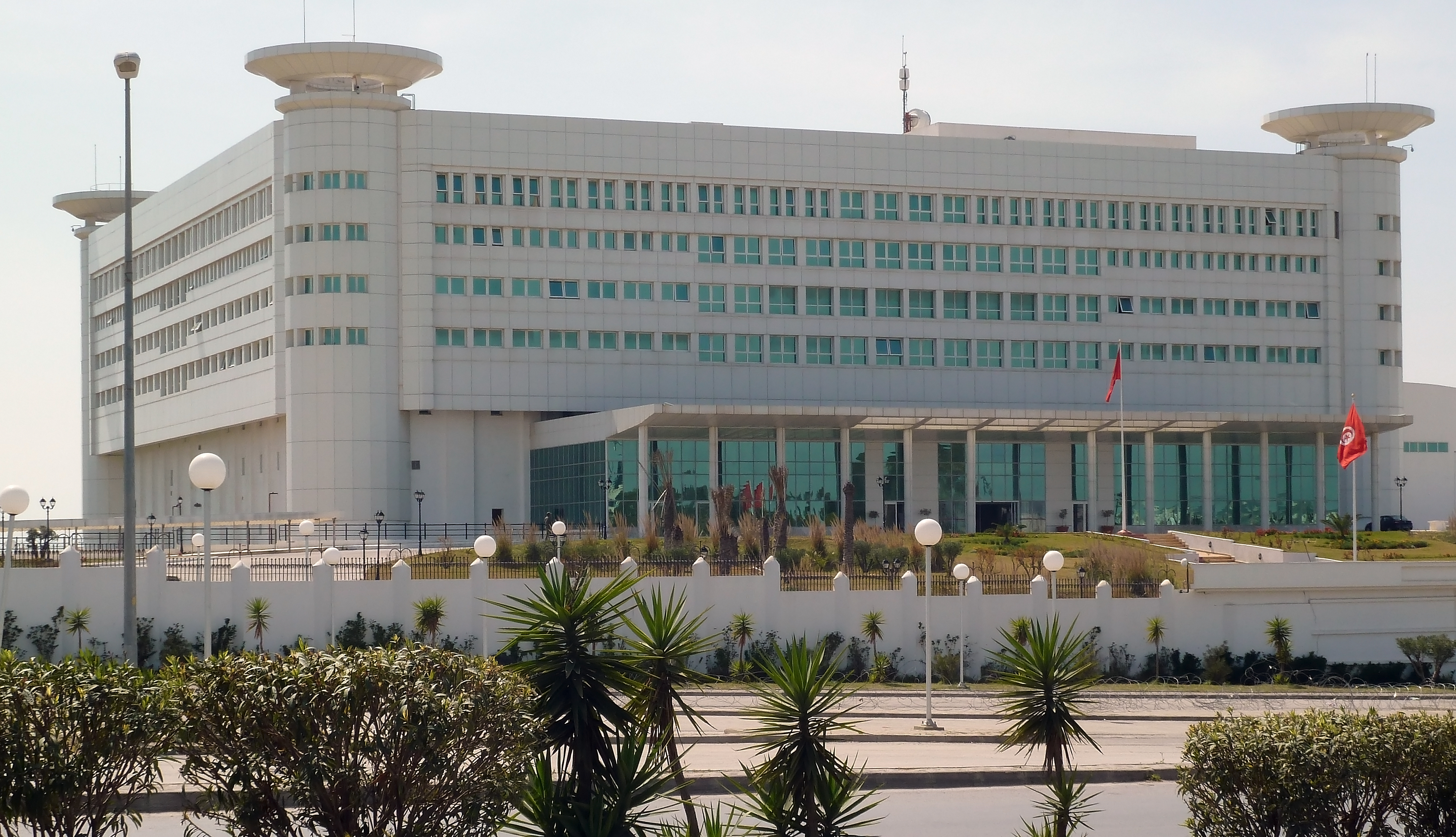
- Télévision Tunisienne headquarters in April 2012
- Type: Broadcast television network
- Country: Tunisia
- Availability: National; international
- TV stations: El Watania 1; El Watania 2
- Headquarters: Avenue de la Ligue Arabe, Mutuelleville, Tunis
- Owner: Government of Tunisia
- Key people: Avatif ed-Dali (interim director)
- Launch date: 31 August 2007; 18 years ago
- Official website: www.tunisiatv.tn
- Replaced: ERTT

The Établissement de la Télévision Tunisienne (TT, French for Establishment of the Tunisian Television or simply Tunisian Television; in Arabic: مؤسسة التلفزة التونسية) is Tunisia's national state-owned public service television broadcaster. The company was established by the country's president Zine El Abidine Ben Ali in August 2007, by dividing the country's former state broadcaster ERTT into separate companies for radio (Radio Tunisienne) and television. Tunisian television operates two nationwide television channels and is an active member of the European Broadcasting Union (EBU) and the Arab States Broadcasting Union (ABSU).

== Background ==
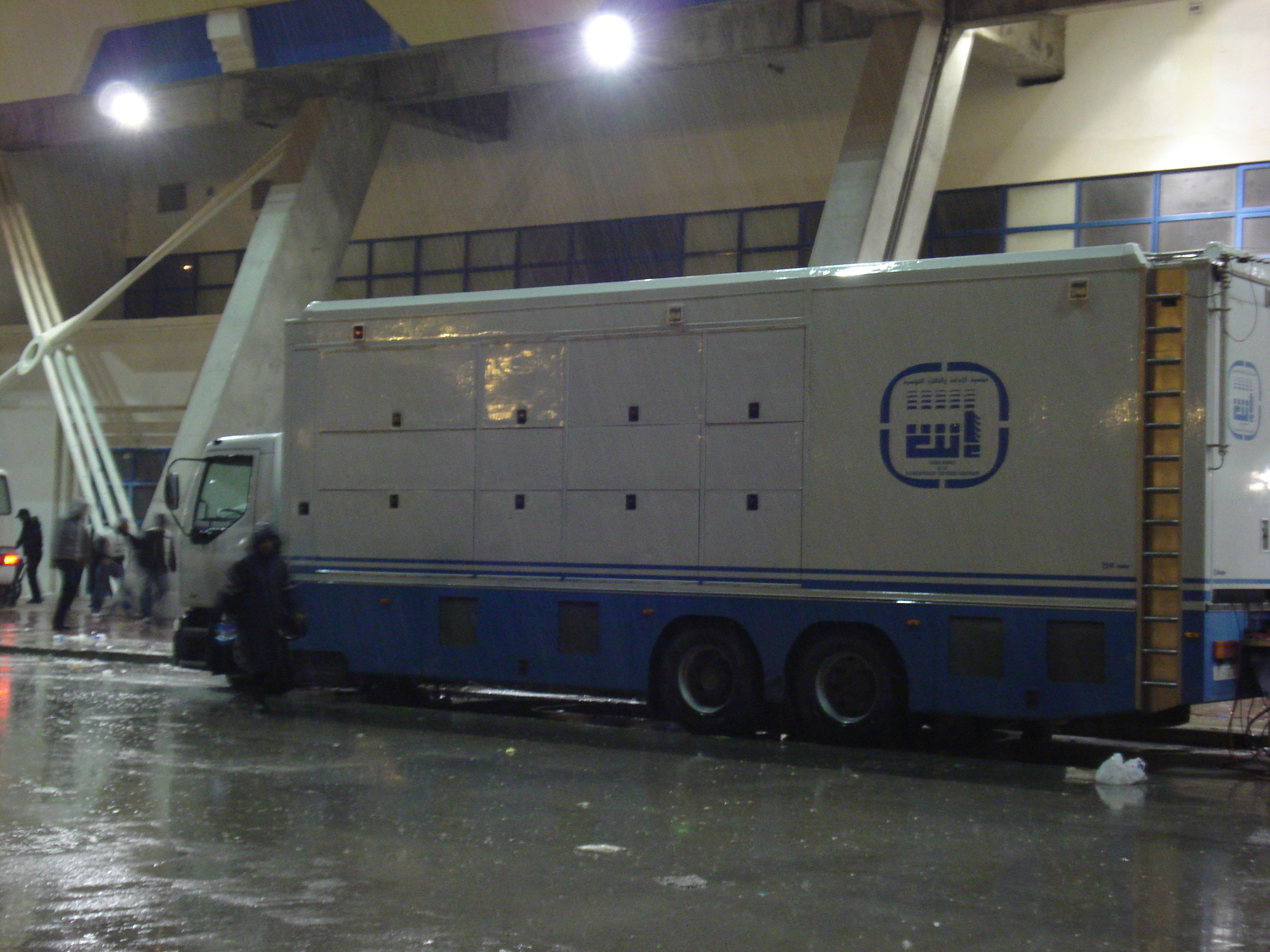
Outside broadcasting van at the Stade Olympique Hammadi Agrebi in February 2009

In the late 1950s and early 1960s, television made its appearance with the transmission of RAI broadcasts in the northeast of the country. From 1963, certain programs were broadcast by Tunisian public television on an experimental basis or on the occasion of special events. The first test broadcast took place in October 1965, with a program lasting 75 minutes. The following year, regular broadcasts began with the official opening of RTT (predecessor to ERTT) on 31 May 1966. Initially, the channel broadcast three hours a day, two hours in Arabic and one hour of French-language programs. In this context, it began developing cooperation with French-speaking television, in particular Télévision Suisse Romande, which provided it with programs and welcomed trainees in its Geneva studios.

By 1976, Tunisian television began broadcasting in color, and in June 1983, the channel changed its name to RTT 1, in connection with the establishment of the French language television channel RTT 2 (a collaboration between Tunisia's RTT and French broadcaster ORTF with programming from La deuxième chaîne (The Second Channel), later Antenne 2 following the breakup of ORTF and now France 2). RTT 2 (later replaced by Arabic language channel Tunis 2 in 1990) was closed in 1994 and instead replaced by the youth channel Canal 21. French programming from France 2 continued to be aired until the end of October 1999. The two channels later changed their names several times and are currently El Watania 1 and El Watania 2 since 2011. From 2008, Tunisia began preparing its transition from analogue to digital television and the definitive switch takes place on 17 September 2015.

Together with Tunisian state radio, the two television channels were subordinate to the former state broadcaster Établissement de la Radiodiffusion-Télévision Tunisienne (ERTT) from 1990, but in November 2006 President Zine El Abidine Ben Ali decided to split ERTT into two separate companies: Établissement de la Radio Tunisienne and Établissement de la Télévision Tunisienne. The two companies were formally launched on 31 August 2007. Both ERTT successor companies are members of the EBU, African Union of Broadcasting (AUB) and Arab States Broadcasting Union (ASBU).

In 1987, Tunisian television began broadcasting propaganda for the first time, following orders from the country's authorities. However, following the Arab Spring of 2011, the Tunisian media, including Télévision Tunisienne, have been given greater freedom to report and broadcast news and information. Among other things, the country's political opposition has been allowed to run on state-owned radio and television. The state still exercises great influence over the state channels, and in July 2017, the country's government suddenly fired its TV director Elyes Gharbi, allegedly because Télévision Tunisienne had a high over-consumption of money and declining viewership. However, the country's journalists' association believed that the dismissal violated Tunisian law and considered the dismissal a threat to the broadcaster's independence and freedom.

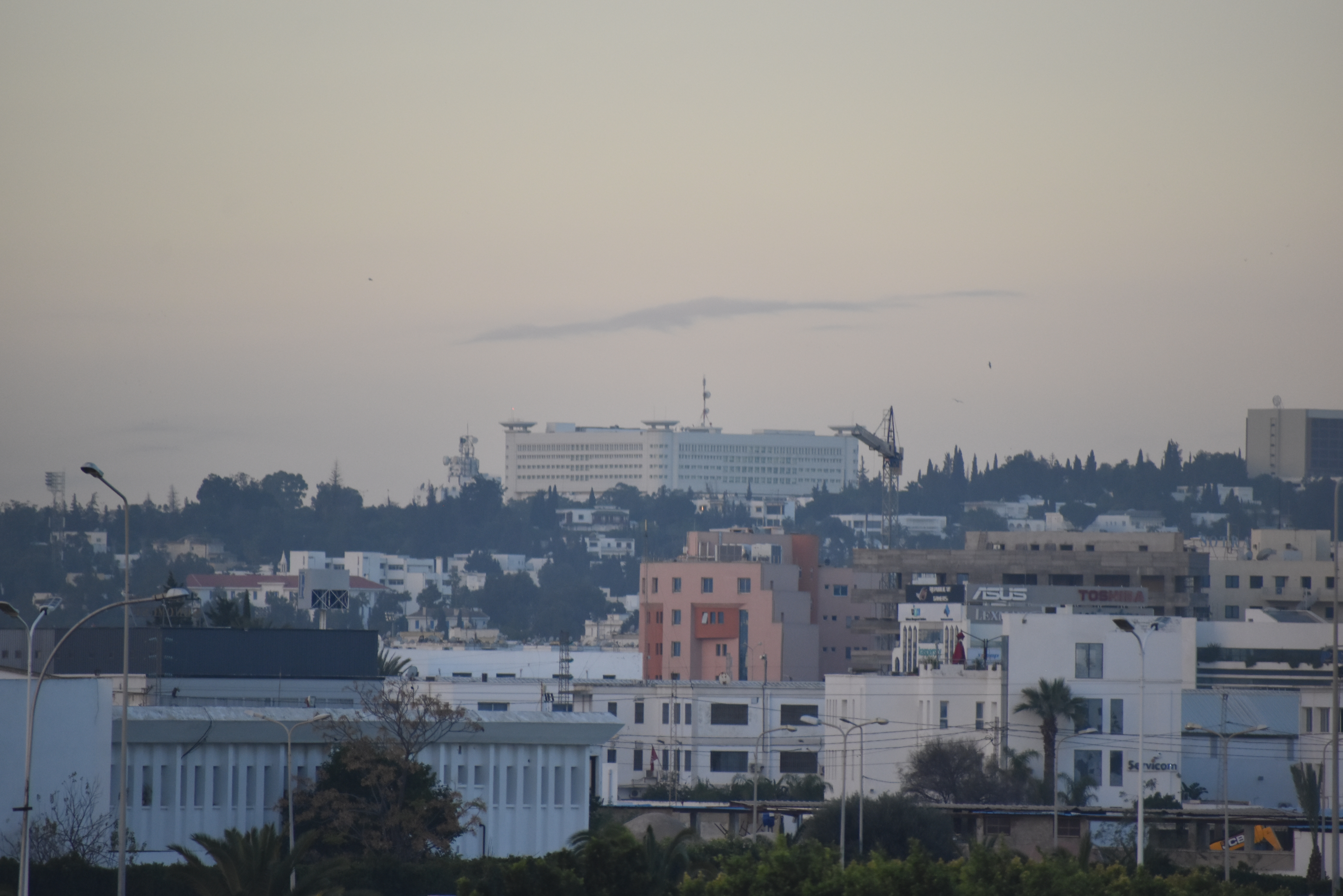
Headquarters in Mutuelle Ville

Tunisian television previously occupied the premises initially reserved for Radio Tunis in Lafayette (now Tunisian Radio House), before moving to its new headquarters in March 2010. The new premises, in the Mutuelleville district of Tunis, is built on eight levels (a garden level, a ground floor and six floors).

== Channels ==
Tunisian television operates two nationwide television channels:

- El Watania 1 (also known as Télévision Tunisienne 1) – the country's public channel, started in 1965 and with regular broadcasts from May 1966. Broadcasts news, sports, entertainment and family programs. Reaches 99.8 percent of the country's population.
- El Watania 2 (also known as Télévision Tunisienne 2) – started in November 1994, as Canal 21, and broadcasts mainly cultural, drama and children's programs.

In addition, the broadcaster operates a number of online platforms and services, including news and sport divisions.

== See also ==
- Television in Tunisia
- Mass media in Tunisia
