= European Broadcasting Union =

Alliance of public service media entities

- Union européenne de radio-télévision
- Logo since 2026

- Countries with one or more members are in dark blue. Associated members in light blue. Suspended members in yellow.
- Predecessor: International Broadcasting Union
- Formation: 12 February 1950; 76 years ago
- Type: Union of broadcasting organisations
- Headquarters: Geneva, Switzerland
- Members: 115 member organisations; (in 57 countries)
- Official language: English, French
- President: Delphine Ernotte
- Director-General: Noel Curran
- Website: Official website

The European Broadcasting Union (EBU; French: Union européenne de radio-télévision, UER) is an alliance of public service media organisations in countries within the European Broadcasting Area (EBA) or who are members of the Council of Europe or to the observers to the Council whose public service broadcasting values align with those of the EBU. As of 2026, it is made up of 115 member organisations from 57 countries, 27 associate members from a further 17 countries, 1 ancillary member, and 6 approved participants. It was established in 1950, and has its administrative headquarters in Geneva.

The EBU owns and operates the Eurovision and Euroradio telecommunications networks on which major television and radio broadcasts are distributed live to its members. It also operates the daily Eurovision news exchange in which members share breaking news footage. In 2017, the EBU launched the Eurovision Social Newswire, an eyewitness and video verification service. Led by Head of Eurovision Social Newswire, Derek Bowler, the service provides members of the EBU with verified and cleared-for-use newsworthy eyewitness media emerging on social media.

The EBU, in co-operation with its members, produces programmes and organises events in which its members can participate, such as the Eurovision Song Contest, its best known production, or the Eurovision Debates between candidates for president of the European Commission for the 2014, 2019 and 2024 parliamentary elections. Noel Curran has been director-general since 2017. It is currently a member of the World Broadcasting Union.

== General description ==
The classic opening ident that preceded and succeeded all Eurovision network transmissions until 1994. The logotypes of both the sending and receiving companies were shown in the middle. This sample shows the 1988-1997 logo of the BBC.

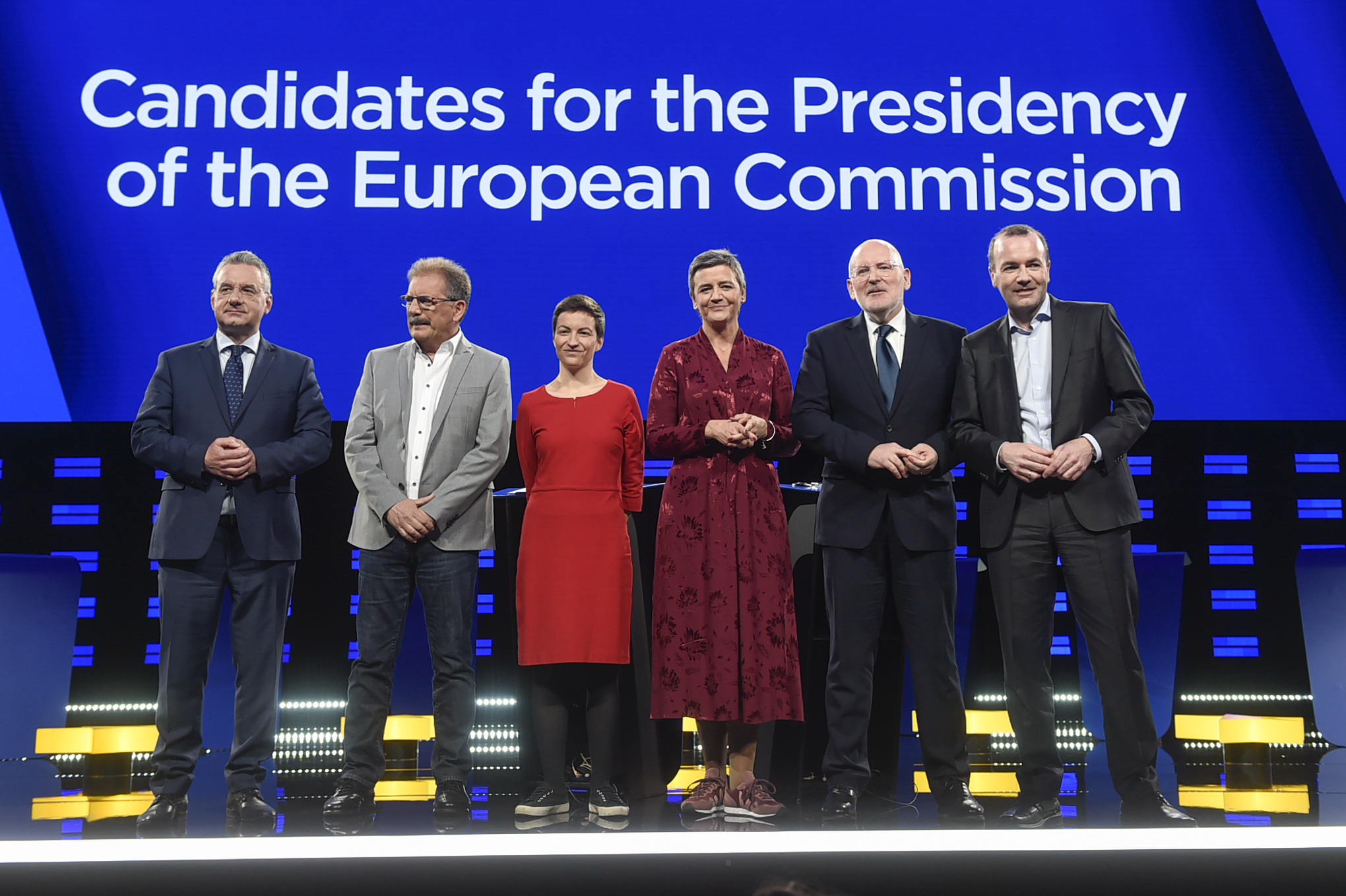
European Commission presidency candidates at Eurovision Debate (May 2019). Left to right: Zahradil, Cué, Keller, Vestager, Timmermans, Weber.

European Broadcasting Union (EBU) members are public service media (PSM) broadcasters established by law but are non-partisan, independent, and run for the benefit of society as a whole.

Membership is for media organisations in countries within the European Broadcasting Area (EBA), as defined by the International Telecommunication Union, or who are members of the Council of Europe. On 25 June 2026, the EBU statute was revised, and membership was opened to countries which are observers to the Council of Europe, and whose "public service media system aligned with core Council of Europe standards".

EBU members come from as far north as Iceland and as far south as Algeria, from Portugal in the west to Azerbaijan in the east, and almost every nation in between; and, since 2026, Canada.

The statutory purpose of the EBU is to promote broadcasting, in particular

- promotion and development of the concept of public media (i.e. radio, television and other electronic media) and their values, in particular, universality, independence, quality, diversity, accountability and innovation, as stated in the Declaration on the Core Values of Public Media of the European Broadcasting Union.
- protecting and improving freedom of expression and information, which is one of the most important foundations of a democratic society and one of the fundamental conditions for its progress and development of every person.
- strengthening media freedom and pluralism, the free flow of information and ideas, and the free formation of opinions.
- the use and development of information and communication technologies as a means of realizing the right, regardless of State borders. express, seek, receive, and disseminate information and ideas, regardless of their source.
- development of cultural diversity, intercultural dialogue and exchanges in order to promote tolerance and solidarity.
- protecting and popularizing Europe's cultural heritage and developing its audiovisual creativity by providing an increasing selection of programs and services.
- strengthening the identity of peoples, social cohesion and integration of all individuals, groups and communities.
- meeting the expectations of the public in the information, educational, cultural and entertainment fields through the production and distribution of a wide range of high-quality programs.

The minimum membership fee in the European Broadcasting Union for a broadcasting organization is 45,000 Swiss francs, and the maximum is 4,000,000 Swiss francs.

Members benefit from:

- Access to content ranging from exclusive sports rights to exchanges for news, music, and children's programmes.
- Representatives in Brussels, and in other international arenas, lobbying for PSM and ensuring the optimal legal and technical framework for broadcasters.
- Opportunities for sharing, learning and collaborating through conferences, working groups, training, and dedicated advice and guidance.
- A centre for learning and sharing new technology and innovation with a team of experts providing strategic advice and guidance.

The EBU owns and operates the Eurovision and Euroradio telecommunications networks on which major television and radio broadcasts are distributed live to its members. The EBU's highest-profile production is the Eurovision Song Contest. The EBU also organises the Junior Eurovision Song Contest, the Eurovision Young Musicians competition, and other competitions which are modeled along similar lines.

Radio collaborations include Euroclassic Notturno—an overnight classical music stream, produced by BBC Radio 3 and broadcast in the United Kingdom as Through the Night—and special theme days, such as the annual Christmas music relays from around Europe. The EBU is a member of the International Music Council.

Most EBU broadcasters have group deals to carry major sporting events including the FIFA World Cup and the inaugural European Championships. Another annually recurring event which is broadcast to the EBU members through the Eurovision network is the Vienna New Year's Concert.

Eurovision Media Services is the business arm of the EBU and provides media services for many media organisations and sports federations around the world.

=== Ident ===
Marc-Antoine Charpentier's Prelude to Te Deum is the tune played before and after the events broadcast via the Eurovision network, including the Eurovision Song Contest.

== History ==
Logo used from 1994 to 17 June 2012
Logo used from 17 June 2012 to 31 December 2025

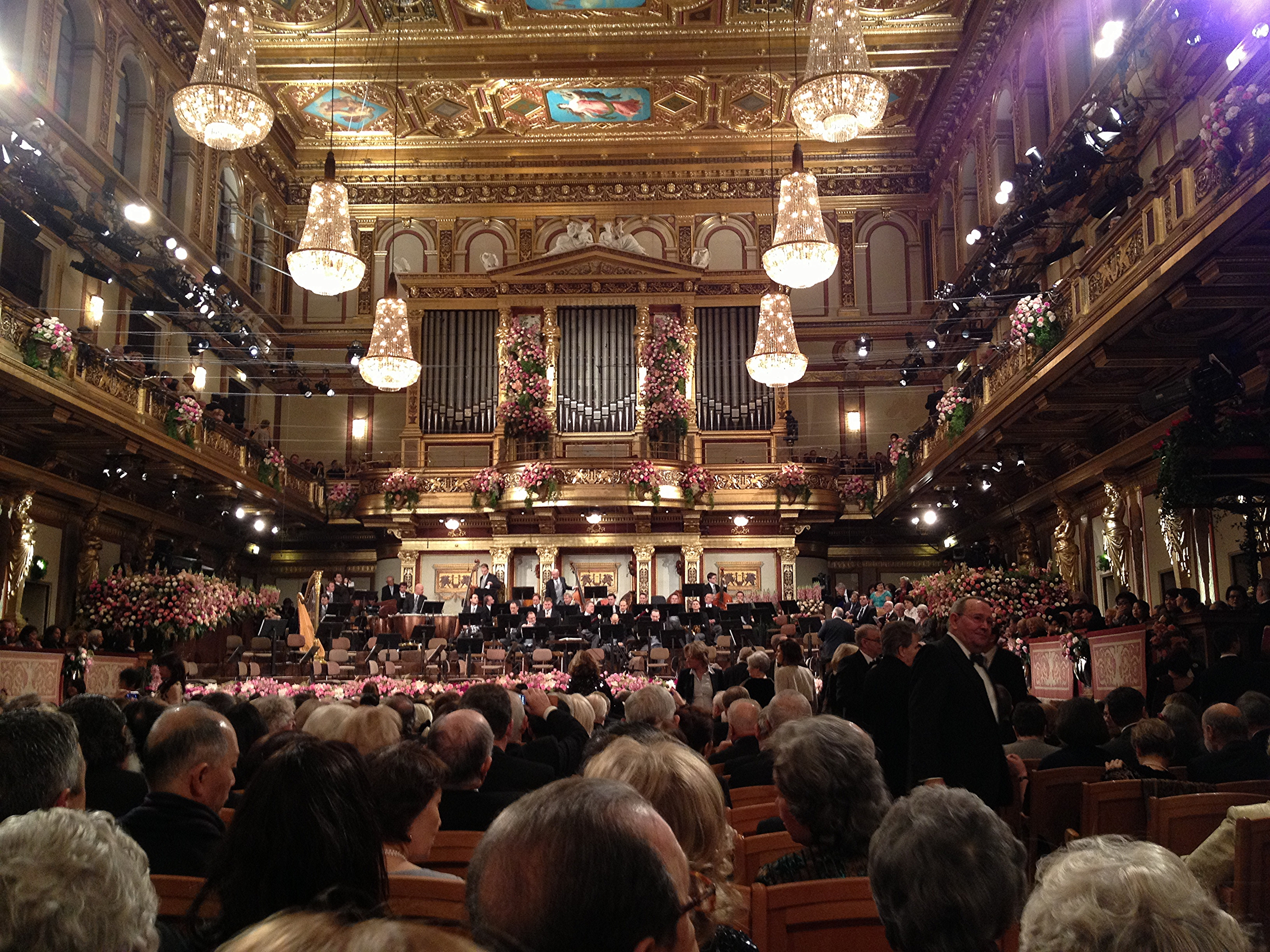
The Vienna New Year's Concert is broadcast to the EBU members through the Eurovision network.

The EBU was a successor to the International Broadcasting Union (IBU) that was founded in 1925 and had its administrative headquarters in Geneva and technical office in Brussels. It fostered programming exchanges between members and mediated technical disputes between members that were mostly concerned with frequency and interference issues. It was in effect taken over by Nazi Germany during the Second World War, and thereafter the Allies viewed it as a compromised organisation that they could not trust.

In the spring of 1946, representatives of the Soviet radio committee proposed forming a new organisation; however, at the same time preparations were being made for an inter-governmental "European Broadcasting Conference" in Copenhagen in 1948 to draw up a new plan for frequency use in the European Broadcasting Area. It was considered necessary to have an organisation that could implement the "Copenhagen Wavelength Plan" but there was disagreement among broadcasters and particularly a fear expressed by the BBC that a new association might be dominated by the USSR and its proposal to give each of its constituent states one vote. France proposed that it would have four votes with the inclusion of its North African colonies. The United Kingdom felt it would have little influence with just one vote.

On 27 June 1946, the alternative International Broadcasting Organisation (IBO) was founded with 26 members and without British participation. The following day the IBU met in General Assembly and an attempt was made to dissolve it but failed; though 18 of its 28 members left to join the IBO. For a period of time in the late 1940s both the IBU and IBO vied for the role of organising frequencies but Britain decided not to be involved in either. The BBC attempted but failed to find suitable working arrangements with them. However, for practical purposes, the IBO rented the IBU technical centre in Brussels and employed its staff. The BBC then proposed a new solution based on the IBO changing its constitution so there will be only one member per International Telecommunication Union (ITU) country, thus ensuring a Western majority over the USSR and its satellite states. In August 1949 a meeting took place in Stresa, Italy, but it resulted in disagreement between delegates on how to resolve the problems. One proposal was for the European Broadcasting Area to be replaced by one that would exclude Eastern Bloc, the Levant, and North Africa.

After Stresa, a consensus emerged among the Western Europeans to form a new organisation and the BBC proposed it be based in London. Meetings in Paris on 31 October and 1 November 1949 sealed the fate of the IBU and IBO, but it was decided not to allow any broadcaster from West Germany to be a founder of the new organisation. On 13 February 1950 the European Broadcasting Union had its first meeting with 23 members from the ITU defined European Broadcasting Area at the Imperial Hotel in Torquay, United Kingdom. The first president was Ian Jacob of the BBC who remained at the helm for ten years while its operation was largely dominated by the BBC due to its financial, technical, and staff input. The most important difference between the EBU and its predecessors was that EBU membership was for broadcasters and not governments. Early delegates said EBU meetings were cordial and professional and very different from the abrupt tone of its predecessors. Broadcasters from West Germany were admitted since 1951 and a working relationship forged with its Eastern counterpart, the International Radio and Television Organisation (OIRT), which existed in parallel with the EBU until its merger on 1 January 1993.

Sunday, 6 June 1954, became the official date of the creation of the Eurovision television program exchange system, when at 4:30 p.m Central European time, the first live broadcast from Montreux, Switzerland, from the Daffodil Festival, a flower festival held every two years since the end of the 19th century (1897), took place under its auspices the year in honor of the return of spring. On the same day, at 19:00 Central European time, a broadcast was organized from the Vatican — a visit to the Apostolic Palace (Sixtus V Palace) and St. Peter's Cathedral, which ended with a sermon by Pope Pius XII on television and a blessing in six languages.

In 1956, the Eurovision Song Contest was first held, broadcast in 10 European countries. An important event was the coverage of the first Olympic Games for the network, the 1956 Winter Olympics in Cortina d'Ampezzo. During the 13 days of the Games, more than 54 programs were broadcast on the network with the participation of the main broadcaster, the Italian RAI. During the Olympic exchange, broadcasters from the GDR and Czechoslovakia temporarily joined the network for the first time. The landmark events broadcast on the network in 1956 also include the wedding of Prince Rainier II and Grace Kelly, broadcast with the participation of the Monaco RMC, and the broadcast of the Tour de France cycling race on the continental air.

In 1958, the first news exchange was carried out between EBU member broadcasters through live broadcasts from the Vatican dedicated to the death of Pope Pius XII. At the same time, in October 1958, test news exchanges were conducted with the involvement of five EBU member broadcasters. In 1959, repeated test exchanges took place, and the number of test participants increased to seven. On 29 May 1961, the news content exchange "Eurovision News" began its work in the format of a daily feed under the name "EVN-1". At 5 p.m. Central European time, the participants of the exchange transmitted news and sports materials, the possibility of using which was then discussed at a radio conference under the direction of a news coordinator from the European Broadcasting Union. At the same time, if possible, the video materials had to be transmitted without voiceover and without the presence of reporters in the frame, and their brief text description was transmitted via telex.

By 1964, 21 EBU members were involved in the exchange of news, transmitting and accepting 1,134 pieces of content. On 1 January 1968, at 6:30 p.m. Central European time, a new exchange channel "EVN-2" was opened, used to transmit color television broadcasting materials. In 1974, the exchange volume amounted to 5,000 pieces of content, and the number of exchange channels reached three - "EVN-0" was added. In the early years of the Eurovision network, up to 55 percent of the content transmitted on it was sports broadcasts., but with the deployment of the news exchange, the share of news and current content has displaced sports content, taking up 60 percent of the total amount of material transmitted over the network. By 1995, the number of exchange channels had reached nine.

In 1967, the first concert in the International Concert Season of the European Broadcasting Union was broadcast from the Queen Elizabeth Hall in London.

In 1989, the Euroradio exchange system was launched. The purpose of the launch was to "ensure the international exchange of high-quality digital audio programs". In 1994, the exchange of radio programs in digital quality began through the ERC (Eurovision Radio Center) control center located in Geneva, Switzerland.

The growing deregulation of national media systems has enormously changed the media landscape in Europe. Faced with growing competition and interest in membership from commercial broadcasters in most European countries, in 1990 the EBU emphasized its status as an organization of public broadcasters in its Marina Charter. Although its television broadcasts were previously based on free data exchange systems between active participants, the EBU commercialized its activities (Eurovision Network Services) and began selling broadcast rights to broadcasters outside the Union in 1994.

In 2021, the digital news service "European Perspective" was launched, designed to offer citizens multilingual coverage of major events, based on content created by 12 public media outlets distributed in the format of a joint online feed, using automatic tools for personalized recommendations of the EBU "PEACH" content, filters to identify the most interesting topics, and a news translation tool. translated into foreign languages by EuroVOX. In the first 8 months of the project's existence, 6.5 thousand articles were published.

In 2022, the Eurovision Documentary Development Scheme (EDDS) program was launched in order to organize the joint production of documentaries and TV series, which was joined by 27 broadcasters from 15 countries.

In April 2025, the EBU, in partnership with its Members, launched Eurovision News Spotlight, a collaborative network for fact-checking and open-source intelligence (OSINT) to actively combat online falsehoods and misinformation across Europe.

In July 2026, following a revision of the EBU statutes, the Canadian Broadcasting Corporation (CBC/Radio-Canada) was accepted as full member.

== Technical activities ==
The objective of the EBU's technical activities is simply to assist EBU Members (see below) in this period of unprecedented technological changes. This includes the provision of technical information to Members via conferences and workshops, as well as in written form (such as the EBU Technical Review, and the EBU tech-i magazine).

The EBU also encourages active collaboration between its Members on the basis that they can freely share their knowledge and experience, thus achieving considerably more than individual Members could achieve by themselves. Much of this collaboration is achieved through Project Groups which study specific technical issues of common interest: for example, EBU Members have long been preparing for the revision of the 1961 Stockholm Plan.

The EBU places great emphasis on the use of open standards. Widespread use of open standards (such as MPEG-2, DAB, DVB, etc.) ensures interoperability between products from different vendors, as well as facilitating the exchange of programme material between EBU Members and promoting "horizontal markets" for the benefit of all consumers.

EBU Members and the EBU Technical Department have long played an important role in the development of many systems used in radio and television broadcasting, such as:

- The AES/EBU digital audio interface, formally known as AES3;
- Serial and parallel interfaces for digital video (ITU-R Recommendations 601 and 656);
- RDS – the radio data system used on FM broadcasting.
- The EBU Loudness Recommendation R 128 and 'EBU Mode' meters (EBU Tech 3341)

The EBU has also actively encouraged the development and implementation of:

- Digital radio (DAB) through Eureka Project 147 and the WorldDAB Forum.
- DVB (Digital Video Broadcasting) through the DVB Project and DigiTAG.
- Digital radio in the bands currently used for AM broadcasting through Digital Radio Mondiale (DRM).
- Standardisation of PVR systems through the TV-Anytime Forum.
- Development of other content distribution networks on the internet through P2PTV; EBU Project Group D/P2P, from November 2007 to April 2008, with a trial of selected member channels, thanks to Octoshape's distribution platform. The EBU is also part of the European P2P-Next project.

== Management ==
The highest body is the General Assembly, the General Assembly, consisting of representatives of member organizations. The General Assembly has all the powers necessary to achieve the objectives of the EBU, as well as the inherent powers to oversee all other bodies of the union. It is authorized to resolve issues of approving the organization's budget for the next financial year, determining the amount of membership fees and other mandatory payments, forming the Executive Committee, electing senior officials of the union, admitting, suspending or expelling broadcasting organizations from membership in the union, and other issues stipulated by the EBU charter, as well as those eligible for inclusion on the agenda. on the recommendation of the Executive Committee.

Since 2007, the General Assembly has been meeting twice a year, for a summer session (usually in late June or early July) and a winter session (usually in late November or early December). The summer session is open to EBU member and associates and is held on the territory of one of the union's members, while it is allowed to hold part of the session in closed mode only in the presence of union members.The winter session is open only to member organizations and is held in Geneva. By decision of the EBU President, external experts or observers may be invited to the General Assembly session to participate in individual meetings (for example, RTK, the Kosovo broadcasting organization, for the 2023 winter session) The General Assembly may be convened for an extraordinary session, which may be attended only by EBU members.

An executive committee, elected by the General Assembly, functions on a permanent basis between the general meetings. The Executive Committee is formed in order to assume responsibility under the supervision of the General Assembly for the implementation of the objectives of the European Broadcasting Union, either directly or through the competent authorities or permanent services of the EBU. To this end, the Executive Committee has a wide range of powers: it submits recommendations to the General Assembly on the EBU development strategy, on the inclusion, suspension and exclusion of broadcasting organizations from the union, on the structure and number of relevant committees, submits five-year strategic and budgetary plans, appoints the Director General on the proposal of the EBU President and independently decides on the termination of his powers, regulates the criteria for membership in the EBU, has the right to single-handedly apply sanctions, up to a ban on participation in certain events and meetings., including participation in the Eurovision television exchange and Euroradio radio exchange systems, and a ban on the nomination of broadcaster officials to the EBU governing bodies (but does not have the right to prohibit a member's participation in the General Assembly), and exercises other powers provided for in the EBU charter.

In its modern form, the Executive Committee has existed since 1 January 2008, having emerged by combining two governing bodies - the Administrative Council (endowed with executive functions since 1950) and the President - into a single executive body. The Executive Committee consists of 11 members elected from the EBU member delegations. The Executive Committee is formed taking into account the mandatory presence of representatives of the "main participants" of the EBU, but should also reflect geographical and cultural diversity. The Executive Committee is elected for a two-year term and holds approximately seven meetings per year.

For the period 2025–2026, the Executive Committee is composed of:

Position	Name and surname	The broadcasting organization
EBU President	Delphine Ernotte	Groupement des Radiodiffuseurs français de l'UER
EBU Vice President	Cilla Benkö	Sveriges Television och Radio Grupp
Member of the Executive Committee	Tim Davie	British Broadcasting Corporation
Member of the Executive Committee	Katja Wildermuth	Arbeitsgemeinschaft der öffentlich-rechtlichen Rundfunkanstalten der Bundesrepublik Deutschland
Member of the Executive Committee	Simona Agnes	Radiotelevisione Italiana
Member of the Executive Committee	Nicolau Santos	Rádio e Televisão de Portugal
Member of the Executive Committee	Milen Mitev	Bâlgarsko Nacionalno Radio
Member of the Executive Committee	Roland Weißmann	Österreichischer Rundfunk
Member of the Executive Committee	Mykola Chernotytskyi	Suspilne Ukraine
Member of the Executive Committee	Monika Garbačiauskaitė-Budrienė	Lietuvos Radijas ir Televizija
Member of the Executive Committee	Nathalie Biancolli	Groupement de Radiodiffusion Monégasque

Five EBU bodies are directly accountable to the Executive Committee: the Audit Committee and the Human Resources Committee, which are composed of the members of the Executive Committee themselves, two expert groups — the statutory (legal) group and the financial group, and the Sports Investment Council, which reports to the Executive Committee only on the acquisition of sports rights for specific projects.

The top officials are the President and the Director General . The President of the EBU exercises general management of the Union and controls its activities, chairs and moderates meetings of the General Assembly and the Executive Committee, and is ex officio a member of the Executive Committee with the right to assign assignments to committee members. Since 1 January 2021, Delphine Ernotte Cunci (France) has been acting as President of the EBU. In case of absence or incapacity of the President, his powers are exercised by the Vice President. Since 30 November 2023, the powers of the EBU Vice-President have been performed by Cilla Benkö Lamborn (Sweden).

The Director General of the EBU manages the permanent services of the European Broadcasting Union. The permanent services of the EBU are designed to ensure the practical implementation of the objectives of the union under the guidance of the competent authorities of the EBU, namely, advising the bodies of the EBU, broadcasting member organizations and partners, projects and the implementation of operational activities. Since September 2017, the powers of the Director General of the EBU have been exercised by Noel Curran (Ireland).

The main office of the EBU is located in Geneva (Since 1950, the office has been located at Rue de Varembé 1, from 1978 to the present — at L'Ancienne-Route 17A). Additional offices and representative offices operate in Brussels, New York, Rome, Moscow and Washington. The EBU Technical Center is also located in Geneva.

== Controversies ==
=== Greek state broadcaster (2013) ===
On 11 June 2013, the Greek government shut down the state broadcaster Hellenic Broadcasting Corporation (ERT) on short notice, citing government spending concerns related to the Euro area crisis. In response, the EBU set up a makeshift studio the same day near the former ERT offices in Athens in order to continue providing EBU members with the news-gathering and broadcast relay services which had formerly been provided by ERT. The EBU put out a statement expressing its "profound dismay" at the shutdown, urging the Greek Prime Minister "to use all his powers to immediately reverse this decision" and offered the "advice, assistance and expertise necessary for ERT to be preserved". Starting on 4 May 2014, the new state broadcaster New Hellenic Radio, Internet and Television (NERIT) began nationwide transmissions, taking over ERT's vacant active membership slot in the EBU. On 11 June 2015, two years after ERT's closure, NERIT was renamed as Hellenic Broadcasting Corporation (ERT), which reopened with a comprehensive program in all radio stations (with nineteen regional, two world-range and five pan-Hellenic range radio stations) and three TV channels ERT1, ERT2 and ERT3.

=== Belarusian and Russian state broadcasters (2021–2022) ===
The Belarusian Television and Radio Company (BTRC) has been accused of repressing its own employees, having fired more than 100 people since a wave of anti-Lukashenko protests in 2020 following alleged election fraud. Many of them have also been jailed. Many voices have been raised against the participation of BTRC in the Eurovision Song Contest 2021 representing Belarus, the argument being that the EBU would make a political statement if it did endorse BTRC by essentially and silently saying that democracy is unimportant and so are basic human rights such as freedom of speech.

On 28 May 2021, the EBU suspended the BTRC's membership as they had been "particularly alarmed by the broadcast of interviews apparently obtained under duress". BTRC was given two weeks to respond before the suspension came into effect, but did not do so publicly. The suspension of the broadcaster was made effective on 1 July 2021. Although initial reports mentioned that it would expire after three years, in April 2024, the EBU confirmed that the suspension had been made indefinite.

The three Russian members of the EBU, Channel One, VGTRK, and Radio Dom Ostankino are all controlled by the Russian government. On 21 February 2022, the Russian government recognised the independence of the Donetsk and Luhansk People's Republics, disputed territories that are internationally recognised as part of Ukraine. Ukraine's public broadcaster Suspilne called on the EBU to terminate the membership of Channel One and VGTRK, and to consider preventing them from participating in the Eurovision Song Contest 2022 representing Russia, citing the Russian government's use of both outlets to spread disinformation surrounding the Russo-Ukrainian war. Following the Russian invasion of Ukraine, several other member broadcasters joined Suspilne in calling for Russia's exclusion from the 2022 contest; Finland's Yle and Estonia's ERR stated that they would not send a representative if Russia was allowed to participate. After initially stating that both Russia and Ukraine would be allowed to compete, the EBU announced on 25 February 2022 that it would ban Russia from participating.

The three Russian broadcasters announced, via a statement released by state media, that they would withdraw from the EBU on 26 February, citing "increased politicization" of the organization. The EBU released a statement saying that it was aware of the reports, but that it had not received any formal confirmation. On 1 March, a further statement from the EBU announced that it had suspended its Russian members from its governance structures. On 26 May, the EBU made effective the suspension of its Russian members indefinitely.

In 2023, an extensive investigation by the EBU Investigative Journalism Network uncovered evidence of a Kremlin-sponsored initiative to take Ukrainian children from the war-torn country to Russia, a war crime under international law.

=== Israel in the Eurovision Song Contest ===
The Gaza war has led to calls for the EBU to exclude Israel, represented by its broadcaster Kan, from the Eurovision Song Contest, and demonstrations against its participation have taken place since 2024. Member broadcasters RÚV (Iceland), RTÉ (Ireland), AVROTROS (Netherlands), RTVSLO (Slovenia), and RTVE (Spain) opted not to take part in the 2026 edition after Israel was permitted to compete.

== Members ==
Map of countries with EBU member broadcasters (as of June 2026)

Countries with full EBU member broadcasters coloured in order of accession since 1950

The Charter of the European Broadcasting Union provides for two main forms of participation in the activities of the EBU:

- membership (called "full membership" until 3 December 2015)
- partnership (associate) (called "associate membership" until 3 December 2015)

=== Full members ===
The members of the EBU are broadcasting organizations or groups of broadcasting organizations that meet all the technical and legal criteria for membership and operate on the territory of the member States of the International Telecommunication Union (ITU) located in the European Broadcasting Area (EBA), or in a member state of the Council of Europe located outside the EBA.

The general conditions for a broadcasting organization to obtain membership in the EBU are:

- the broadcasting organization has the function of carrying out public broadcasting. This function should be fixed in the law on the broadcasting organization, its charter or in any other legal way.
- provision of broadcasting services of a national nature and importance by a broadcasting organization with the permission of the competent authorities. The concept of "national character and importance" is revealed in the detailed membership criteria.
- the broadcasting organization provides diverse and balanced programs for all segments of the population, including programs that take into account the special interests of various segments of the population and minorities.
- the broadcasting organization produces and/or orders a significant part of the programs at its own expense and under its own editorial control.
- virtually all households in the country from which the broadcasting organization originates are able to receive all major radio or television programs in full with satisfactory technical quality.
- the broadcasting organization is not affiliated with an agency that competes with the European Broadcasting Union in the field of acquiring rights to broadcast sports events.
- a broadcasting organization can demonstrate its ability to fulfill its membership obligations (act to achieve the statutory goals of the EBU, actively contribute to the exchange of television and radio broadcasts, as well as to events held by the EBU; respect the spirit of solidarity and integrity towards the EBU, its activities and its members, including compliance with the EBU Charter and Rules and its contractual obligations imposed on behalf of its members; to refrain from actions that may harm public broadcasting organizations or are incompatible with the objectives of the EBU; to provide the necessary documentation or information necessary to establish the compliance of the broadcasting organization's activities with its obligations under membership in the EBU).

A broadcasting organization is accepted as a member of the EBU on the basis of a decision of the General Assembly, adopted by an absolute majority of votes on the issue that a candidate meets all the conditions of membership, based on proposals from the Executive Board.

EBU members receive the right to access Eurovision television content exchange networks and Euroradio radio content exchange networks.

Starting from 4 December 2024, the EBU provides for a special type of membership - an international member. This status is available to broadcasting organizations (or groups of such organizations) engaged in pan-European or transnational activities that are coordinated and/or funded by at least two EBU member organizations. At the same time, such an organization should actively contribute to achieving the goals of the EBU and respecting its values, as well as carry out broadcasting activities that complement the offerings of its founding broadcasters with a wide range of programs, namely materials about culture, fiction, documentaries, news and reviews of current events. (Article 3.6a of the new edition of the EBU Charter). Since 1 January 2025, the French-German broadcasting organization ARTE has become the first international member of the EBU, broadcasting documentaries, feature films and news programs.

As of July 2026, the list of EBU members comprises the following 69 organisations from 57 countries.

Country	Broadcasting organisation	National script/Native Name	Abbr.	Year
Albania	Albanian Radio-Television	Radio Televizioni Shqiptar	RTSH	1999
Algeria	Public Establishment of Television	المؤسّسة العمومية للتلفزيون, Établissement public de télévision	EPTV	1970
Algeria	National Sound Broadcasting Company	المؤسسة العمومية للبث الإذاعي, Entreprise nationale de radiodiffusion sonore	ENRS	1970
Algeria	Algerian Broadcasting Company	البث الإذاعي والتلفزي الجزائري, Télédiffusion d'Algérie	TDA	1970
Andorra	Radio and Television of Andorra	Ràdio i Televisió d'Andorra	RTVA	1999
Armenia	Television and Radio Broadcasting Network of Armenia: Public Television Company of Armenia (AMPTV); Public Radio of Armenia (Armradio)	Հայաստանի հեռուստատեսային և ռադիոհաղորդիչ ցանց, Hayastani Herrustatesayin yev Rradiohaghordich' Ts'ants': Հայաստանի Հանրային Հեռուստաընկերություն, Hayastani Hanrayin Herrustaynkerut'yun; Հայաստանի Հանրային Ռադիո, Hayastani Hanrayin Radio	TRBNA	2005
Austria	Österreichischer Rundfunk		ORF	1953
Azerbaijan	Ictimai		İCTI/İTV	2007
Belgium	Vlaamse Radio- en Televisieomroeporganisatie/Radio-Télévision Belge de la Communauté Française		VRT/RTBF	1950
Bosnia and Herzegovina	Radio and Television of Bosnia and Herzegovina	Bosanskohercegovačka radiotelevizija	BHRT	1993
Bulgaria	Bulgarian National Radio	Българско национално радио, Bǎlgarsko nacionalno radio	BNR	1993
Bulgaria	Bulgarian National Television	Българска национална телевизия, Balgarska natsionalna televizia	BNT	1993
Canada	Canadian Broadcasting Corporation/Société Radio-Canada		CBC	2026
Croatia	Croatian Radiotelevision	Hrvatska radiotelevizija	HRT	1993
Cyprus	Cyprus Broadcasting Corporation	Ραδιοφωνικό Ίδρυμα Κύπρου, Radiofonikó Ídryma Kýprou, Kıbrıs Radyo Yayın Kurumu	CyBC	1969
Czech Republic	Český Rozhlas		CR	1994
Czech Republic	Česká Televize		CT	1994
Denmark	DR		DR	1950
Denmark	TV2 Danmark		DK/TV2	1989
Egypt	National Media Authority	الهيئة الوطنية للإعلام	NMA	1985
Estonia	Eesti Rahvusringhääling		ERR	1993
Finland	Yleisradio	Rundradion	YLE	1950
France	Groupement des Radiodiffuseurs français de l'UER: France Télévisions (FTV) (France 2, France 3, France 4, France 5 and Réseau France Outre-mer); Radio France (RF); France Médias Monde (FMM) (RFI, France 24, Monte Carlo Doualiya)		GRF	1950
Georgia	Georgian Public Broadcaster	საქართველოს საზოგადოებრივი მაუწყებელი, sakartvelos sazogadoebrivi mauts'q'ebeli	GPB	2005
Germany	The Working Group of Public Broadcasters in the Federal Republic of Germany: Bavarian Broadcasting (BR); Hessian Broadcasting (HR); Central German Broadcasting (MDR); Northern German Broadcasting (NDR); Radio Bremen (RB); Berlin-Brandenburg Broadcasting (RBB); Saarland Broadcasting (SR); Southwest Broadcasting (SWR); West German Broadcasting (WDR); German Wave (DW); Radio Germany (DLR)	Arbeitsgemeinschaft der öffentlich-rechtlichen Rundfunkanstalten der Bundesrepublik Deutschland (ARD): Bayerischer Rundfunk (BR); Hessischer Rundfunk (HR); Mitteldeutscher Rundfunk (MDR); Norddeutscher Rundfunk (NDR); Radio Bremen (RB); Rundfunk Berlin-Brandenburg (RBB); Saarländischer Rundfunk (SR); Südwestrundfunk (SWR); Westdeutscher Rundfunk (WDR); Deutsche Welle (DW); Deutschlandradio (DLR)	ARD	1952
Germany	Second German Television	Zweites Deutsches Fernsehen	ZDF	1963
Greece	Hellenic Broadcasting Corporation	Ελληνική Ραδιοφωνία Τηλεόραση, Ellinikí Radiofonía Tileórasi	ERT	2015
Hungary	Hungarian Radio and Television	Magyar Rádió és Televízió	MRTV	2026
Iceland	Ríkisútvarpið		RÚV	1956
International	Arte		ARTE	2024
Ireland	Raidió Teilifís Éireann		RTÉ	1950
Ireland	TG4		TG4	2007
Israel	Israeli Public Broadcasting Corporation	תַּאֲגִיד הַשִׁיְדּוּר הַיִשְׂרָאֵלִי, Taʾăḡid HaŠidûr HaYiśrāʾēli; (هَيْئَة اَلْبَثّ اَلْإِسْرَائِيلي, Hayʾat al-Baṯṯ al-Isrāʾīlī	IPBC	2018
Italy	RAI – Radiotelevisione Italiana		RAI	1950
Jordan	Jordan Radio and Television Corporation	مؤسسة الإذاعة والتلفزيون الأردني	JRTV	1970
Latvia	Latvian Public Media Services	Latvijas Sabiedriskie mediji	LPSM	1993
Lebanon	Télé Liban	تلفزيون لبنان	TL	1980
Lithuania	Lietuvos Radijas ir Televizija		LRT	1993
Luxembourg	CLT Multi Media		CLT	1950
Luxembourg	Radio 100,7	Média de Service Public 100,7	MSP	1997
Malta	Public Broadcasting Services Ltd.		PBS	1970
Moldova	Teleradio-Moldova		TRM	1993
Monaco	Groupement de Radiodiffusion monégasque: Monaco Media Diffusion; TVMonaco		GRMC	1950
Montenegro	Radiotelevizija Crne Gore	Радио и телевизија Црне Горе	RTCG	2006
Morocco	Société Nationale de Radio Télévision	الشَرِكَة الوَطَنِيَّة لِلْإِذَاعَة وَالتَلْفَزَة, ⵜⴰⵎⵙⵙⵓⵔⵜ ⵜⴰⵏⴰⵎⵓⵔⵜ ⵏ ⵓⵏⵣⵡⴰⵢ ⴷ ⵜⵉⵍⵉⴼⵉⵣⵢⵓⵏ	SNRT	1950
Netherlands	Dutch Public Broadcaster: AVROTROS en PowNed; BNNVARA; KRO-NCRV; Omroep MAX en WNL; Evangelical Broadcasting; Humanist Broadcasting; Broadcaster Black; Unheard Netherlands (ON); Dutch Broadcasting Foundation (NOS); NTR	Nederlandse Publieke Omroep (Dutch Public Broadcaster): AVROTROS en PowNed; BNNVARA; KRO-NCRV; Omroep MAX en WNL; Vereniging De Evangelische Omroep (EO); VPRO en HUMAN; Omroep Zwart; Ongehoord Nederland (ON); Nederlandse Omroep Stichting (NOS); NTR	NPO	1950
North Macedonia	MKRTV	Македонска радио-телевизија	MKRTV	1993
Norway	Norsk Rikskringkasting		NRK	1950
Norway	TV 2 AS		NO/TV2	1993
Poland	Polskie Radio i Telewizja: Telewizja Polska SA (TVP); Polskie Radio SA (PR)		PRT	1993
Portugal	Rádio e Televisão de Portugal		RTP	1950
Romania	Societatea Română de Radiodifuziune		ROR	1993
Romania	Societatea Română de Televiziune		RO/TVR	1993
San Marino	San Marino RTV		SMRTV	1995
Serbia	Radiotelevizija Srbije	Радио-телевизија Србије	RTS	2006
Slovakia	Slovenská televízia a rozhlas		STVR	1993
Slovenia	Radiotelevizija Slovenija		RTVSLO	1993
Spain	Radiotelevisión Española		RTVE	1955
Sweden	Sveriges Television och Radio Grupp: Sveriges Television Ab (SVT); Sveriges Radio Ab (SR); Swedish Educational Broadcasting Company (UR)		STR	1950
Switzerland	SRG SSR		SRG SSR	1950
Tunisia	Radio tunisienne et Télévision tunisienne: Radio Tunisienne; Télévision Tunisienne	Radio tunisienne et Télévision tunisienne: مؤسسة الإذاعة التونسية; مؤسسة التلفزة التونسية	RTTT	1950
Turkey	Türkiye Radyo-Televizyon Kurumu		TRT	1950
Ukraine	Suspilne Ukraine		UA:PBC	1993
United Kingdom	British Broadcasting Corporation		BBC	1950
United Kingdom	United Kingdom Independent Broadcasting: ITV Anglia Television; ITV Border Television; ITV Central Television; Channel Television; ITV Granada Television; ITV Wales Television; ITV West Television; ITV London Television; ITV Meridian Television; ITV Tyne Tees Television; ITV Westcountry Television; ITV Yorkshire Television; S4C (UKIB/S4C)		UKIB	1960
Vatican City	Radio Vaticana		RV	1950

=== Ancillary members ===
Any groups or organisations from a large autonomous linguistic community that is situated within a country that has a membership of the EBU and has its own media regulatory system are granted an ancillary member. Organisations must have a service in their local official language and be deemed useful to the union.

The following EBU broadcast member have status as Ancillary Member in June 2026.

Country	Territory	Broadcasting organisation	Abbr.	Year
Spain	Catalonia	Corporació Catalana de Mitjans Audiovisuals	CCMA	2026

=== Suspended members ===
In accordance with paragraph 5.13 of the EBU Charter, in the event that, due to exceptional circumstances, an EBU Member or Associate is in the process of reorganization or in another state of structural change, is being replaced or has been completely/partially replaced by another organization or does not fully comply with the terms of participation in the EBU, the Executive Board may, at its discretion, make an interim decision which allows it to continue or suspend the membership status of such a member.

In case of suspension of membership status, an EBU Member or Associate is not entitled to vote at EBU meetings under certain conditions, and its obligation to pay membership fees and subscriptions is temporarily terminated. During the suspension, cooperation with the EBU regarding the provision of services (for example, sports or informational content) is carried out on a contractual basis. The suspension decision is valid until the next session of the EBU General Assembly, however, the Assembly is authorized to extend the suspension of a participant for any period of time deemed appropriate.

It is not possible to participate in EBU events (for example, the Eurovision Song Contest) during the suspension.

Country	Broadcasting organisation	National script/Native Name	Abbr.	Year	Suspended
Belarus	National State TV and Radio Company of the Republic of Belarus		BTRC	1993	2021
Libya	Libya National Channel	قناة ليبيا الوطنية	LNC	2011	Unknown
Russia	Channel One Russia		C1R	1996	2022
Russia	All-Russia State Television and Radio Broadcasting Company		RTR	1993	2022
Russia	Radio Dom Ostankino: Radio Mayak (MK); Radio Orpheus (OP)		RDO	1996	2022

The decision to suspend BTRC's membership was made by the EBU Executive Board at a meeting on 28 May 2021. The EBU stated that the Belarusian broadcaster had two weeks to provide explanations before the suspension takes effect. At the end of the 86th EBU General Assembly, which confirmed the earlier decision of the Executive Board, the suspension came into force on 1 July 2021. In an interview with the Belarus Today website published on 1 July 2021, BTRK CEO Ivan Eismont said that "for now, we are talking about putting our relations on pause for three years." On 23 April 2024, following an inquiry by the Eurovision Song Contest fan outlet ESC Discord, the EBU confirmed that BTRC's suspension had been made indefinite.

The decision to suspend the membership of the Russian broadcasters was taken by the EBU Executive Board on 26 May 2022, with immediate effect. This suspension is also indefinite and subject to periodic review.

=== Past full members ===
Country	Broadcasting organisation	National script/Native Name	Abbr.	From	To
Algeria	Radiodiffusion-Télévision Algérienne		RTA	1970	1989
Belgium	National Institute of Radio Broadcasting	Institut national de radiodiffusion, INR; Nationaal Instituut voor de Radio-Omroep, NIR	INR-NIR	1950	1960
Czechoslovakia	Czechoslovak Television	Československá televize	ČST	1991	1992 (Note: Succeeded by Česká televize (ČT) of the Czech Republic and Slovenská televízia (STV) of Slovakia)
Egypt	Egyptian State Broadcasting		ESB	1950	1958
Egypt	Egyptian Radio and Television Union		ERTU	1985	2017
Estonia	Eesti Raadio		ER	1993	2007
Estonia	Eesti Televisioon		EE/ETV	1993	2007
Finland	MTV3		FI/MTV; OWL (Note: Abbreviation used during the 1990s to distinguish Mainostelevisio from Magyar Televízió. OWL is a reference to MTV3's mascot, an owl.)	1993	2019
France	Radiodiffusion-Télévision Française		RTF	1950	1964
France	Office de Radiodiffusion Télévision Française		ORTF	1964	1975
France	Télédiffusion de France		TDF	1975	1982
France	TF1		TF1	1975	2018
France	Europe 1		E1	1978	2022
France	Organisme Français de Radiodiffusion et de Télévision		OFRT	1983	1992 (Note: Succeeded by Groupement des Radiodiffuseurs Français de l'UER (GRF))
France	Canal+		C+	1984	2018
Greece	New Hellenic Radio, Internet and Television	Νέα Ελληνική Ραδιοφωνία, Ίντερνετ και Τηλεόραση, Néa Ellinikí Radiofonía, Ínternet kai Tileórasi	NERIT	2014	2015 (Note: Succeeded again by Hellenic Broadcasting Corporation (ERT))
Hungary	Duna TV		Duna	2013	2015 (Note: Succeeded by Duna Media Service; operated by Media Support and Asset Management Fund (MTVA))
Hungary	Magyar Rádió		MR	1993	2015
Hungary	Magyar Televízió		MTV	1993	2015
Hungary	Media Support and Asset Management Fund	Médiaszolgáltatás-támogató és Vagyonkezelő Alap	MTVA	2011	2026
Hungary	Duna Media Service Provider		DM	2015	2026
Israel	Israel Broadcasting Service	Kol Yisrael	IBS	1957	1965
Israel	Israel Broadcasting Authority	רָשׁוּת השִּׁדּוּר, Rashút HaShidúr	IBA	1965	2017 (Note: Succeeded by the Israeli Public Broadcasting Corporation (KAN))
Jordan	Jordan Television Corporation		JTV	1970	1985
Libya	Libyan Jamahiriya Broadcasting Corporation	الجماهيرية اللّيبيّة	LJBC	1974	2011
Luxembourg	Établissement de Radiodiffusion Socioculturelle du Grand-Duché de Luxembourg		ERSL	1996	2022 (Note: Succeeded by Média de service public 100,7 (MSP))
Malta	Maltese Broadcasting Authority		MBA	1970	2003
Monaco	Groupement de Radiodiffuseurs Monégasques: Radio Monte Carlo (RMC); Télé Monte-Carlo (TMC)		GRMC	1950	2021
Monaco	Telemontecarlo (now La7)		TMC	1981	2001
Morocco	Radiodiffusion Nationale Marocaine		RNM	1956	1961
Morocco	Radiodiffusion-Télévision Marocaine		MA/RTM	1969	2005
Netherlands	Dutch Radio Union	Nederlandse Radio Unie	NRU	1950	1967 (Note: Succeeded by Nederlandse Omroep Stichting (NOS))
Netherlands	Dutch Television Foundation	Nederlandse Televisie Stichting	NTS	1951	1967
Netherlands	TROS		TROS	1964	2014 (Note: Succeeded by AVROTROS)
Portugal	Emissora Nacional		EN	1950	1976
Portugal	Radiodifusão Portuguesa SA		RDP	1976	2007
Russia	Russian State TV and Radio Company «Ostankino»		RTO	1993	1995 (Note: Succeeded by Channel One (C1R))
Serbia and Montenegro	Alliance of Public Radios and Televisions	Udruženje javnih radija i televizija	UJRT	2001	2006 (Note: Succeeded by Radio i televizija Crne Gore (RTCG) of Montenegro and Radio-televizija Srbije (RTS) of Serbia separately (previously these were sub-broadcasters of UJRT))
Slovakia	Slovenský rozhlas		SRo	1993	2011 (Note: Succeeded by Radio and Television of Slovakia (RTVS))
Slovakia	Slovenská televízia		STV	1993	2011
Slovakia	Radio and Television of Slovakia	Rozhlas a televízia Slovenska	RTVS	2011	2024 (Note: Succeeded by Slovak Television and Radio (STVR))
Spain	Antena 3 Radio		A3R	1986	1993
Spain	Radio Popular SA COPE		COPE	1998	2019
Spain	Sociedad Española de Radiodifusión		SER	1982	2020
Sweden	TV4		SE/TV4	2004	2019
Tunisia	Radiodiffusion-Télévision Tunisienne		RTT	1957	1990
Tunisia	Tunisian Radio and Television Establishment	Établissement de la radiodiffusion-télévision tunisienne	ERTT	1990	2007 (Note: Succeeded by Radio and Télévision Tunisienne (RTT))
Ukraine	Derzhkomteleradio		DRTU	1993	1995
Ukraine	National Public Broadcasting Company of Ukraine		NTU	1995	2017
Ukraine	National Radio Company of Ukraine		NRU	1995	2017
United Kingdom	Independent Television Authority		ITA	1959	1972
United Kingdom	Independent Television Companies Association		ITCA	1959	1981
United Kingdom	Independent Broadcasting Authority		IBA	1972	1981 (Note: Succeeded by United Kingdom Independent Broadcasting (UKIB))
United Kingdom	Commercial Radio Companies Association (now Radiocentre)		CRCA	1981 (Note: Founded as Association of Independent Radio Contractors (AIRC) in 1973. It became CRCA in 1996 and merged with Radio Advertising Bureau in 2006 to create Radiocentre.)	2006
Yugoslavia	Jugoslavenska radio-televizija / Jugoslovenska radio-televizija	Југославенска радио-телевизија / Југослoвенска радио-телевизија	JRT	1950	21/05/1992

=== Associate members ===
Countries with associate EBU membership

Any group or organisation from an International Telecommunication Union (ITU) member country, which provides a radio or television service outside of the European Broadcasting Area, is permitted to submit applications to the EBU for Associate Membership.

It is also noted by the EBU that any broadcaster that is granted Associate Member status does not gain access into Eurovision events – notable exceptions being those from Australia, who have participated in the Eurovision Song Contest since 2015 and the Junior Eurovision Song Contest between 2015 and 2019; Canada (Now a full member of the EBU), who participated in the Eurovision Young Dancers between 1987 and 1989; and Kazakhstan, who participated in the Junior Eurovision Song Contest between 2018 and 2022 – all of which were individually invited.

The decision on the usefulness of a broadcasting organization as an EBU Associate is made by the EBU General Assembly solely at its discretion, taking into account the recommendation of the EBU Executive Board. In turn, the Executive Board is required to verify the compliance of the EBU Associate with their status every five years.

EBU Associates can access Eurovision television content exchange networks and Euroradio radio content exchange networks on a contractual basis. The terms of the agreement are reviewed annually by the EBU Executive Board. Associates have the right to receive documentation and attend events related to the EBU Summer General Assembly, as well as thematic assemblies in the sectors of Radio, Television, Legal and Public Relations, Technical and International Broadcasting.

The list of Associate Members of EBU comprised the following 27 broadcasting companies from 17 countries as of July 2026.

Country	Broadcasting organisation	National script/Native Name	Abbr.	Year
Australia	Australian Broadcasting Corporation		ABC	1950
Australia	Special Broadcasting Service		SBS	1979
Brazil	TV Cultura (Fundação Padre Anchieta)		FPA	2012
Chile	Canal 13		C13	1971
China	China Media Group	中央广播电视总台	CMG	2010
China	Shanghai Media Group	上海文化廣播影視集團有限公司	SMG	2016
Cuba	Radio cubana y televisión cubana: Radio Cubana (RCU); Televisión Cubana (TVCU)		RCTC	1992
Georgia	Teleimedi		TEME	2004
Georgia	Rustavi 2	რუსთავი 2	RB	2003
Hong Kong	Radio Television Hong Kong	香港電台	RTHK	1983
Iran	Islamic Republic of Iran Broadcasting	صدا و سيمای جمهوری اسلامی ايران	IRIB	1968
Japan	Nippon Hōsō Kyōkai	日本放送協会	NHK	1951
Japan	TBS Holdings	TBSホールディングス	TBS	2000
Kazakhstan	Khabar Agency	"Хабар" Агенттігі, Агентство «Хабар»	KA	2016
Malaysia	Radio Television of Malaysia	Radio Televisyen Malaysia, راديو تيليۏيشن مليسيا	RTM	1970
Mauritius	Mauritius Broadcasting Corporation		MBC	1980
New Zealand	Radio New Zealand	Te Reo Irirangi o Aotearoa	RNZ	1950
New Zealand	Television New Zealand	Te Reo Tātaki o Aotearoa	TVNZ	1980
Oman	Public Authority for Radio and TV of Oman		PART	1976
South Korea	Korean Broadcasting System	한국방송공사	KBS	1974
Syria	General Authority for Radio and Television	الهيئة العامة للإذاعة والتلفزيون	GART	1978
United States	American Broadcasting Company		ABC	1959
United States	American Public Media		APM	2004
United States	Columbia Broadcasting System		CBS	1956
United States	National Public Radio		NPR	1971
United States	National Broadcasting Company		NBC	1953
United States	WFMT Radio Network		WFMT	1980

=== Past associate members ===
The list of past associate members of EBU comprises the following 97 broadcasting companies from 55 countries and 1 autonomous territory.

Country	Broadcasting organisation	National script/Native Name	Abbr.	From	To
Argentina	Canal Siete		C7	1970	1999
Argentina	El Trece		C13	1973	1999
Australia	Australian Fine Music Network		AFMN	2008	2010
Australia	FreeTV Australia		Free	1962	2024
Bahamas	Broadcasting Corporation of The Bahamas		BCB	1975	1999
Bangladesh	Bangladesh Television		BTV	1974	2026
Barbados	Caribbean Broadcasting Corporation		BB/CBC	1971	2005
Benin	Radiodiffusion du Dahomey		RD	1972	1975
Bolivia	Televisión Boliviana		TVB	1970	1999
Brazil	Associação Brasileira das Emissoras de Rádio e Televisão		ABERT	1962	1980
Brazil	Diários Associados		DA	1950	1980
Brazil	Emissoras Unidas de Rádio e Televisão		EURT	1961	1969
Brazil	TV Globo		GLOBO	1970	1999
Brazil	Network of Independent Broadcasters	Rede de Emissoras Independentes	REI	1974	1975
Brazil	Rádio Nacional		RN	1974	1975
Canada	[[Canadian Broadcasting Corporation|Canadian Broadcasting Corporation/Société Radio-Canada]]		CBC	1950	2026
Chad	Chadian National Radio	Radiodiffusion Nationale Tchadienne	RNT	1955	1974
Chile	Televisión Nacional de Chile		TVN	1970	1999
Colombia	Instituto Nacional de Radio y Televisión		IRV	1970	1999
Congo	Radiodiffusion Télévision Congolaise		RTC	1974	2009
Costa Rica	Telesistema Nacional S.R.L.		TSN	1969	1971
Ecuador	Teleamazonas		4TA	1975	1999
Gabon	Radiodiffusion-Télévision Gabonaise		RTG	1960	2009
Gambia	Gambia Radio & Television Service		GRTS	1962	2010
Ghana	Ghana Broadcasting Corporation		GBC	1953	1990
Greenland	Greenlandic Broadcasting Corporation	Kalaallit Nunaata Radioa	KNR	1978	2011
Guyana	Guyana Broadcasting Service		GBS	1977	2009
Haiti	Service des Télécommunications			1950	1969
Honduras	Televisora de Honduras, S.A.		TH	1969	1971
Hong Kong	Asia Television	亞洲電視有限公司	ATV	1957	2010
Hong Kong	Television Broadcasts Limited		TVB	1973	2012/2013
India	All India Radio		AIR	1979	2021
Indonesia	Radio Republik Indonesia		RRI	1973	1981
Indonesia	Televisi Republik Indonesia		TVRI	1973	1981
Iraq	Iraqi Broadcasting and Television Establishment		IBTE		
Ivory Coast	Radiodiffusion Television Ivoirienne		RTI	1961	2010
Jamaica	Jamaica Broadcasting Corporation		JBC	1970	1981
Japan	Mainichi Broadcasting System	株式会社毎日放送, Kabushiki-gaisha Mainichi Hōsō	MBS	1970	2009
Japan	TV Asahi		ANB	1960	2009
Japan	Fuji Television		FTN	1969	2012/2013
Japan	National Association of Commercial Broadcasters in Japan		NACB	1984	2012/2013
Japan	Nippon Television Network Corporation	日本テレビ放送網株式会社, Nihon Terebi Hōsōmō kabushiki gaisha	NTV	1953	2009
Japan	Tokyo FM		TFM	1986	2021
Kenya	The Voice of Kenya		VK	1964	2010
Kuwait	Kuwait Broadcasting and Television Service		KBTS	1970	2010
Liberia	Liberian Broadcasting Corporation		LBC	1964	1981
Madagascar	Radiodiffusion-Télévision de Madagascar		RTM	1971	2010
Malawi	Malawi Broadcasting Corporation		MBC	1964	2010
Mauritania	Television of Mauritania		MR/TVM	2003	2013
Mexico	Telesistema Mexicano		TSM	1960	1973
Mexico	Mexican Independent Television	Televisión Independiente de México	TIM	1969	1973
Mexico	Tele-Cadena Mexicana		TCM	1969	1973
Mexico	Televisa SA de CV		TVA	1973	2005
Mexico	Corporación Mexicana de Radio y Televisión		CMRT	1973	1999
Nepal	Nepal Television	नेपाल टेलिभिजन	NTVC	1985	2010
Nepal	Association of Community Radio Broadcasters Nepal		ACORAB	2023	2026
Niger	Office de radiodiffusion et Télévision du Niger		ORTN	1967	1981
Nigeria	Nigerian Broadcasting Corporation		NBC	1962	2010
Pakistan	Radio Pakistan	ریڈیو پاکستان	RP	1950	1974
Pakistan	Pakistan Television Corporation	پاکستان ٹیلی وژن نیٹ ورک	PK/PTV	1971	2010
Palestine	Palestinian Broadcasting Corporation	هيئة الإذاعة والتلفزيون الفلسطينية	PBC	2002	2014
Papua New Guinea	National Broadcasting Corporation		NBC	1977	2015
Peru	Teledos		T2	1969	1971
Peru	Compañía Peruana de Radiodifusión		AMÉRICA	1969	1999
Peru	Panamericana Televisión		PANTEL	1969	1999
Qatar	Qatar Television and Broadcasting Service		QTBC	1973	2009
Qatar	Al Jazeera Children's Channel	قناة الجزيرة للأطفال	JCC	2008	2013
Qatar	Qatar Radio	إذاعة قطر	QR	2009	2009
Saudi Arabia	Saudi Arabian Broadcasting and Television Service		SABTVS	1962	2012
Senegal	Radiodiffusion Télévision Sénégalaise		RTS	1973	2006
Sri Lanka	Ceylon Broadcasting Corporation		CBC	1967	1973
Sri Lanka	Sri Lanka Broadcasting Corporation	ශ්‍රී ලංකා ගුවන් විදුලි සංස්ථාව, Shrī Lankā Guvan Viduli Sansthāva, இலங்கை ஒலிபரப்புக் கூட்டுத்தாபனம், Ilangkai Oliparappuk Kūṭṭuttāpaṉam	SLBC	2007	2010
South Africa	South African Broadcasting Corporation		SABC	1951	2022
South Korea	Munhwa Broadcasting Corporation	주식회사문화방송	MBC	1961	2009
Sudan	Sudan Television Service		STS	1976	2009
Tanzania	Tanzania Broadcasting Corporation		TBC	1960	2010
United Arab Emirates	Emirates Media Inc.		EMI		2006
United Arab Emirates	United Arab Emirates Radio And Television – Dubai		UAERTVD		2006
United States	National Association of Educational Broadcasters		NAEB		1981
United States	Time Life Television		TIME		1970
United States	United States Information Agency		USIA		
United States	National Educational Television		NET		1970
United States	Educational Broadcasting Corporation		EBC	1971	
United States	Corporation for Public Broadcasting		CPB	1972	2025
United States	Cable News Network		CNN		
United States	International Broadcasting Bureau		IBB		2007
United States	Minnesota Public Radio		MPR	2004	2007
United States	New York Public Radio		NYPR	2012	2016
United States	WGBH Educational Foundation		WGBH	2014	2014
Upper Volta	Radiodiffusion-Télévision Voltaïque		RTV	1963	1981
Uruguay	Sociedad Televisora Larrañaga (Tele 12)		C12	1970	1976
Venezuela	Teleinversiones S.A.			1969	1970
Venezuela	Corporación Venezolana de Televisión		VV	1973	1999
Venezuela	Radio Caracas Televisión		RCTV	1953	2010
Venezuela	Radio Caracas Radio		RCR	1960	2010
Zaire	La Voix du Zaïre		VZ	1976	1997
Zimbabwe	Zimbabwe Broadcasting Corporation		ZBC	1980	2010

=== Approved participant members ===
Any groups or organisations from a country with International Telecommunication Union (ITU) membership, which does not qualify for either the EBU's Active or Associate memberships, but still provide a broadcasting activity for the EBU, are granted a unique Approved Participants membership, which lasts approximately five years. An application for this status may be submitted to the EBU at any given time, providing an annual fee is paid.

The following six EBU broadcast members have status as Approved Participants in July 2026.

Country	Broadcasting organisation	Abbr.
France	Euronews	EURONEWS
France	Institut national de l'audiovisuel	INA
France	TV5Monde	TV5
North Macedonia	JP Makedonska radiodifuzija	JP MRD
Serbia	Radio Television of Vojvodina	RTV
Spain	Cellnex	CELLNEX

The following members previously had status as Approved Participants.

Country/region	Broadcasting organisation	National script/Native Name	Abbr.
France	International Radio and Television Union	Université radiophonique et télévisuelle internationale	URTI
Hungary	Antenna Hungária		AH
Israel	Israeli Educational Television		IETV
MENA	MBC Limited – Middle East Broadcasting Centre		MBC
Russia	Russian Television and Radio Broadcasting Network		RTRN
South Africa	Sentech		SNTC
Spain	Abertis Telecom S.A.		ABERTIS
Spain	Retevisión		RETE

== Organised events ==
The EBU in co-operation with the respective host broadcaster organises competitions and events in which its members can participate if they wish to do so. These include:

=== Eurovision Song Contest ===
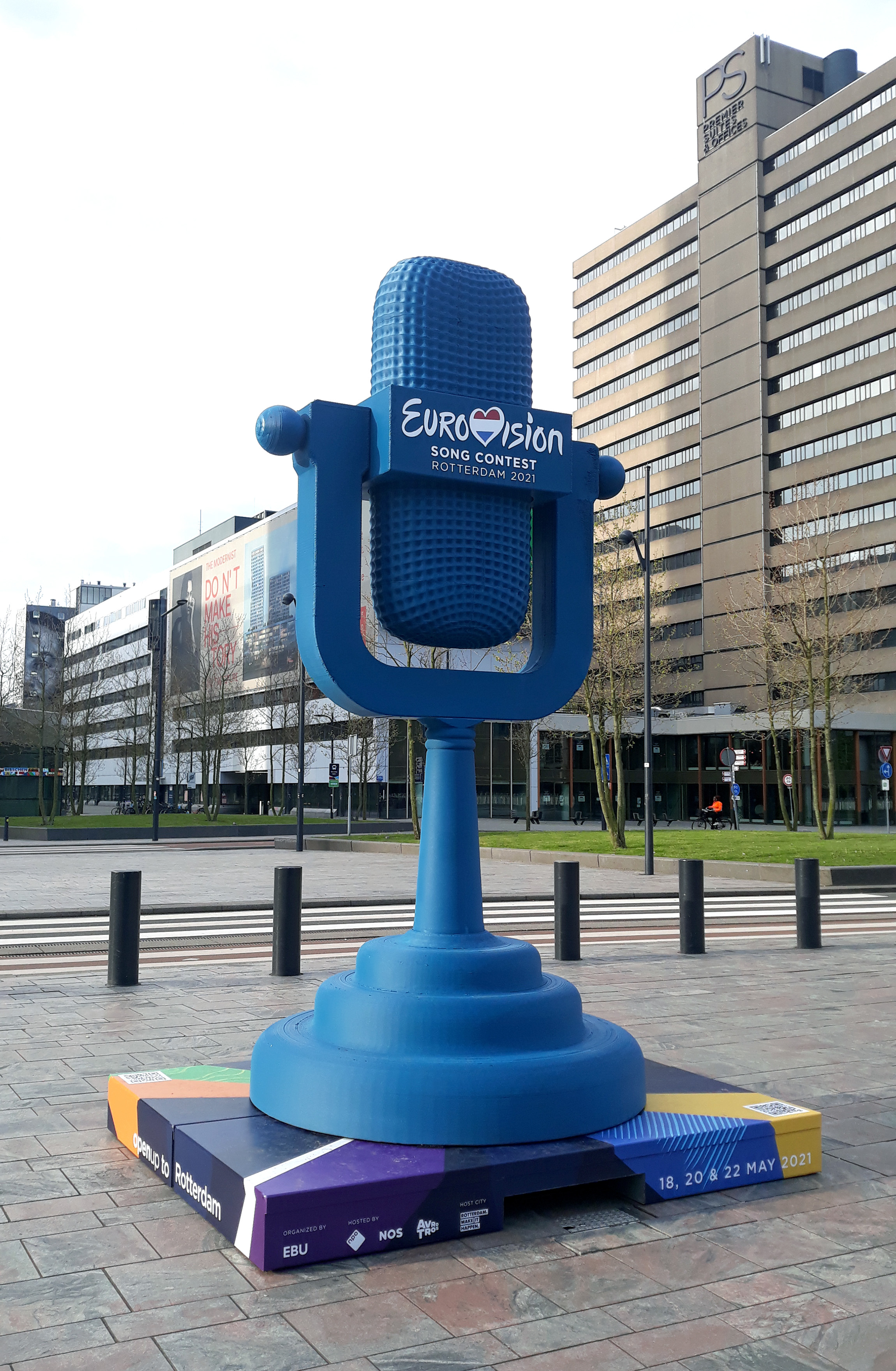
A replica of the Eurovision Song Contest trophy on display in Rotterdam, host city of the 2021 edition

The Eurovision Song Contest (French: Concours Eurovision de la chanson) is an annual international song competition between EBU members, that was first held in Lugano, Switzerland, on 24 May 1956. Seven countries participated – each submitting two songs, for a total of 14. This was the only contest in which more than one song per country was performed: since 1957, all contests have allowed one entry per country. The 1956 contest was won by the host nation, Switzerland. The winner of the most recent contest, which took place in Vienna, Austria, is Bulgaria.

=== Let the Peoples Sing ===
Let the Peoples Sing is a biennial choir competition, the participants of which are chosen from radio recordings entered by EBU radio members. The final, encompassing three categories and around ten choirs, is offered as a live broadcast to all EBU members. The overall winner is awarded the Silver Rose Bowl. The first winner was Glasgow Phoenix Choir, conducted by their Chorus Master Peter Mooney, from Scotland in the 1961 competition that was held in London. The most recent winner is Copenhagen Girls Choir from Denmark, conducted by Anne-Terese Sales, in the 2024 competition that was held in London.

=== Jeux sans frontières ===
Jeux sans frontières (English: Games Without Borders, lit. 'Games Without Frontiers') was a Europe-wide television game show. In its original conception, it was broadcast from 1965 to 1999 under the auspices of the EBU. In 1980, at the peak of its popularity, the game show attracted an audience of 110 million viewers across Europe. The original series' run ended in 1982, but was revived in 1988 with a different composition of nations and was hosted by smaller broadcasters.

=== Eurovision Young Musicians ===
Eurovision Young Musicians is a competition for European musicians that are between the ages of 12 and 21 years old. It is organised by the EBU and is a member of EMCY. The first competition was held in Manchester, United Kingdom on 11 May 1982. The televised competition is held every other year, with some countries holding national finals. Since its inaugural edition in 1982, it has become one of the most important music competitions on an international level. The winner of the most recent contest, which took place in Yerevan, Armenia, is Poland.

=== Eurovision Young Dancers ===
Eurovision Young Dancers was a biennial dance showcase broadcast on television throughout Europe. The inaugural competition was held in Reggio Emilia, Italy on 16 June 1985. It uses a format similar to the Eurovision Song Contest. Every participating country has the opportunity to send a dance act to compete for the title of Eurovision Young Dancer. The competition is for solo dancers, and all contestants must be between the ages of 16 and 21, and not professionally engaged. The winner of the most recent contest, which took place in Prague, Czech Republic, is Poland.

=== Euroclassic Notturno ===
Euroclassic Notturno is a six-hour sequence of classical music recordings, assembled by BBC Radio from material supplied by EBU members and streamed back to those broadcasters by satellite for use in their overnight classical-music schedules. The recordings used are taken not from commercial CDs, but from earlier (usually live) radio broadcasts.

=== Junior Eurovision Song Contest ===
The Junior Eurovision Song Contest (French: Concours Eurovision de la Chanson Junior) is an annual international song competition that was first held in Copenhagen, Denmark, on 15 November 2003. Sixteen countries participated in the inaugural edition that year, with each submitting one song. The inaugural contest was won by Croatia. The winner of the most recent edition, which took place in Ta' Qali, Malta, is Armenia.

=== Eurovision Dance Contest ===
The Eurovision Dance Contest (not to be confused with Eurovision Young Dancers) was an international dancing competition that was held for the first time in London, United Kingdom, on 1 September 2007. The inaugural contest was won by Finland. The competition was repeated in 2008 when it was held in Glasgow, United Kingdom, but has not been held since. The winner of the most recent contest is Poland.

=== Magic Circus Show ===
The Magic Circus Show was an entertainment show organised by the EBU, which took place in 2010, 2011 and 2012 in Geneva, Switzerland. Children aged between 7–14 representing eight countries within the EBU membership area performed a variety of circus acts at the Geneva Christmas Circus (French: Cirque de Noël Genève). The main show was also accompanied by the Magic Circus Show Orchestra.

=== Eurovision Choir ===
The inaugural Eurovision Choir, featuring non-professional choirs selected by EBU members, took place on 22 July 2017 in Riga, Latvia, hosted by the Latvian broadcaster Latvijas Televīzija (LTV). Nine countries took part in the first edition. Carmen Manet from Slovenia was the first winner and the winner of the most recent contest, which took place in Gothenburg, Sweden, was Vocal Line from Denmark.

=== European Sports Championships ===
The European Sports Championships is a multi-sport event involving some of the leading sports in Europe. The European Governing Bodies for athletics, aquatics, cycling, rowing, golf, gymnastics and triathlon, coordinated their individual championships as part of the first edition in the summer of 2018, hosted by the cities of Berlin, Germany (already chosen as the host for the 2018 European Athletics Championships) and Glasgow, United Kingdom (already chosen as the host for the 2018 European Aquatics Championships, and which concurrently also hosted the events of the other sports).

== Olympic Games ==
The EBU first covered the Olympic Games in 1956, and has historically acquired broadcasting rights on behalf of its members. The amount paid by the EBU steadily increased over time, paying US$22 million for broadcasting rights for Los Angeles 1984, US$240 million for Atlanta 1996, US$394 million for Athens 2004 and US$746million for Vancouver 2010 and London 2012.

In 2008, the International Olympic Committee (IOC) decided to negotiate individually with broadcasters for rights to the 2014-2016 Olympic Games – as the EBU had not "offered enough money". The IOC subsequently signed individual deals with broadcasters in France, Germany, Italy, Spain, Turkey and the UK, selling the remainder of the broadcasting rights to Sportfive for US$315 million. Despite an attempt by the EBU to purchase broadcasting rights for the 2018-2024 Olympic Games, the IOC awarded a contract to Discovery Communications in June 2015. The EBU criticised the decision, stating that it shows a "shift in the IOC's positioning of the Olympic Games as a free-to-air event that reached all of the European television audience – to a pay event with minimum free-to-air obligations".

In January 2023, the IOC announced that a joint bid from the EBU and Warner Bros. Discovery had been awarded rights for all Olympic Games from the 2026 Winter Olympics to the 2032 Summer Olympics. The joint bid follows criticism of the 2015 deal to award European television rights to Discovery. Each EBU member will broadcast at least 200 hours of coverage of the Summer Olympics and at least 100 hours of the Winter Olympics, whereas Warner Bros. Discovery will have unlimited rights.

== See also ==
- African Union of Broadcasting
- Arab States Broadcasting Union
- Asia-Pacific Broadcasting Union
- Caribbean Broadcasting Union
- Commonwealth Broadcasting Association
- Commonwealth Press Union
- Europe by Satellite
- International Telecommunication Union
- North American Broadcasters Association
- Organización de Telecomunicaciones de Iberoamérica
