= Libya National Channel =

- Country: Libya
- Headquarters: Amman, Jordan

Programming
- Language: Arabic

History
- Launched: 2011

Links
- Website: Official website

Libya National Channel (LNC) (Arabic : قناة ليبيا الوطنية), also known as Libya's National Television Channel or simply Libya's Channel, is a television news channel in Libya. The channel was established after the fall of Muammar al-Gaddafi in 2011, and is a member of the European Broadcasting Union (EBU) and the Arab States Broadcasting Union (ASBU). The channel aims to provide the Libyan people with truthful news and objective information, as well as programs that do not advocate the views of individual parties or groups. LNC purchases and broadcasts programs from other Arab broadcasters and production companies.

Due to the security situation in Libya, and several attacks on the LNC and other media houses, the news channel is broadcast from the Jordanian capital Amman. However, the channel has regional offices and correspondents throughout Libya.

== See also ==
- Television in Libya
