= Tataouine Radio =

Tataouine; Tunisia
- Broadcast area: Tataouine, Tunisia
- Frequency: 87.6, 88.1, 89.5, 91.2, 95.8, 96.6, 102.6, 103.3, 105.7 et 106.3 MHz

Programming
- Language: Arabic

Ownership
- Owner: Radio Tunisienne

History
- First air date: November 7, 1993

Links
- Website: radiotataouine.tn

Tataouine Radio is a public local radio created on November 7, 1993. It broadcasts from Tataouine city targeting locals of South East Tunisia.

== Content ==
The radio broadcasts 18 hours a day with generic content targeting mainly the audiences of South East Tunisia with diverse programming.

== Broadcast ==
=== FM ===
Available only in South East Tunisia. The frequencies vary from region to region. Sometimes the service is available in different frequencies.

- 92.2 MHz
- 89.5 MHz
- 102.6 MHz
- 87.6 MHz
- 96.6 MHz

=== Internet ===
Radio is also broadcast online through the official website of the station.
