= African Union of Broadcasting =

Association of national broadcasters

- Union Africaine de Radiodiffusion
- Formation: 1962; 64 years ago
- Type: Union of broadcasting organisations
- Headquarters: Dakar, Senegal
- Members: 47 active members
- Official language: English, French, Arabic and Portuguese
- Director-General: Grégoire Ndjaka
- Website: www.uar-aub.org
- Formerly called: Union of African National Television and Radio Organizations (1962–2006)

The African Union of Broadcasting (AUB, French: Union africaine de radiodiffusion, Arabic: الاتحاد الأفريقي للبث, romanized: Alaitihad al'Afriqiu Lilbathi, Portuguese: União Africana de Radiodifusão) is a professional body composed of the national radio and television organizations of African states. The organization works to develop the African broadcast industry by encouraging the exchange of indigenous programming and obtaining preferential satellite tariffs for member organizations. It is a member of the World Broadcasting Unions.

== History ==
AUB was founded in 1962 as the Union of African National Television and Radio Organizations (French: Union des Radiodiffusions et Televisions Nationales d'Afrique, URTNA), an autonomous specialized agency working under the auspices of the OAU. The organization was renamed to African Union of Broadcasting at the 2006 URTNA General Assembly held in Abuja, Nigeria.

== Members ==
Full members

These are members who are independent nations within the AUB broadcasting region, and consist of at least one member per country.

| Country | Broadcasting Organisation |
|---|---|
| Algeria | Radio Algeria |
| Algeria | Public Establishment of Television |
| Angola | Televisão Pública de Angola |
| Benin | Société de radio et de télévision du Bénin |
| Botswana | Botswana Television |
| Burkina Faso | Radio Télévision du Burkina |
| Burundi | Burundi National Radio and Television |
| Cameroon | Cameroon Radio Television |
| Cape Verde | Radiotelevisão Caboverdiana |
| Cape Verde | TV Record |
| Chad | Radiodiffusion Nationale Tchadienne |
| Comoros | ORTC |
| Democratic Republic of the Congo | Radio-Télévision nationale congolaise |
| Djibouti | Radio Television of Djibouti |
| Egypt | Egyptian Radio and Television Union |
| Equatorial Guinea | TVGE |
| Eritrea | Eri-TV |
| Eswatini | Eswatini Broadcasting and Information Service |
| Ethiopia | ETV (Ethiopia) |
| Gabon | Radio Télévision Gabonaise |
| Gambia | Gambia Radio & Television Service |
| Ghana | Ghana Broadcasting Corporation |
| Guinea | Radio Télévision Guinéenne |
| Guinea-Bissau | National Broadcasting of Guinea-Bissau |
| Ivory Coast | Radiodiffusion Television Ivoirienne |
| Kenya | Kenya Broadcasting Corporation |
| Lesotho | Lesotho Broadcasting Service |
| Liberia | Liberia Broadcasting System |
| Libya | Libya Al Ahrar TV |
| Madagascar | Télévision Malagasy |
| Malawi | Malawi Broadcasting Corporation |
| Mali | Office de Radiodiffusion-Télévision du Mali |
| Mauritania | TV de Mauritanie |
| Mauritania | Radio Nationale (Mauritania) |
| Mauritius | Mauritius Broadcasting Corporation |
| Morocco | Société Nationale de Radiodiffusion et de Télévision |
| Mozambique | Televisão de Moçambique |
| Namibia | Namibian Broadcasting Corporation |
| Niger | Office of Radio and Television of Niger |
| Nigeria | Nigerian Television Authority |
| Republic of the Congo | Télé Congo |
| Rwanda | Radio Rwanda |
| São Tomé and Príncipe | TVS (São Tomé and Príncipe) |
| Senegal | Radiodiffusion Télévision Sénégalaise |
| Seychelles | Seychelles Broadcasting Corporation |
| Sierra Leone | Sierra Leone Broadcasting Corporation |
| South Africa | South African Broadcasting Corporation |
| South Sudan | South Sudan Television |
| Sudan | Sudan TV & Radio |
| Tanzania | Tanzania Broadcasting Corporation |
| Togo | Togolese Television |
| Tunisia | Radio Tunisienne |
| Tunisia | Télévision Tunisienne |
| Uganda | Uganda Broadcasting Corporation |
| Zambia | Zambia National Broadcasting Corporation |
| Zimbabwe | Zimbabwe Broadcasting Corporation |

=== Participant members ===
The following nine AUB broadcast members have status as Participants as of May 2022.

| Broadcasting Organisation | Country of origin |
|---|---|
| E-MEDIA INVEST | Senegal |
| LABEL TV | Gabon |
| METRO TV | Ghana |
| MULTI TV | Ghana |
| MTA International | Ghana |
| MUVI TV | Zambia |
| NET 2 | Ghana |
| SOICO | Mozambique |
| SKYY | Ghana |
| TV3 | Ghana |

=== Associate members ===
Below is a list of associate members of the AUB. These are international broadcasters beyond the AUB regions, and national broadcasting associations.

| Country | Broadcasting organisation | Abbr. |
|---|---|---|
| Canada | Videoship | — |
| Canada | Canadian Broadcasting Corporation | CBC/SRC |
| France | Eutelsat | — |
| France | France Médias Monde | FMM |
| Italy | RAI - Radiotelevisione Italiana | Rai |
| Vatican City | Vatican Radio | VR |
