= Tunisian Union of Agriculture and Fisheries =

The Tunisian Union of Agriculture and Fisheries (Arabic: الاتحاد التونسي للفلاحة والصيد البحري; French: Union Tunisienne de l’Agriculture et de la Peche, or UTAP) is a Tunisian national trade union organization for farmers and fishermen. The current president is Abdelmajid Ezzar.

== See also ==
- UGTT
- UTICA
