= El Watania 1 =

Tunisian public television channel

Tunisia NAT 1
- Country: Tunisia
- Broadcast area: Tunisia; Arab world; European Union
- Headquarters: Tunis, Tunisia

Programming
- Language: Arabic
- Picture format: 1080i HDTV (downscaled to 576i for the SD feed)

Ownership
- Owner: Télévision Tunisienne
- Sister channels: El Watania 2

History
- Launched: 31 May 1966; 60 years ago
- Former names: RTT (1966–1983); RTT 1 (1983–1992); TV7 (1992–1997); Tunis 7 (1997–2008); Tunisie 7 (2008–2011); El Watania 1 (2011–present)

Links
- Website: www.watania1.tn

El Watania 1, also known as Télévision Tunisienne 1, is the first Tunisian public national television channel. It is owned and operated by Télévision Tunisienne (formerly ERTT). Formerly named RTT (1966–1983), RTT 1 (1983–1992), TV7 (1992–1997), Tunis 7 (1997–2008), Tunisie 7 (2008–2011), it has been known as El Watania 1 since 2011.

== History ==
The first televised broadcast in Tunisia dates from December 15, 1963 on the occasion of the solemn celebration of the evacuation of Bizerte; the retransmission is carried out with the technical assistance of Italian television. In 1964, Mohamed Mzali was appointed general manager of the RTT (Radiodiffusion-Télévision Tunisienne) and was responsible for launching national television. In October of the same year, the RTT retransmitted from Bizerte the congress of the Destourian Socialist Party, the presentation of which was entrusted to Malika Ben Khamsa.

The first experimental broadcast, which took place on October 1, 1965 for an hour and a quarter, was accessible to the inhabitants of Tunis and its suburbs using the Boukornine VHF transmitter which broadcast Italian television programs. On October 29 of the same year, a second experimental session lasted two and a quarter hours.

Each time, music or plays were broadcast live. On October 31, the experimental services broadcast the first football match in its history live from the Chedly-Zouiten Stadium. During the three experimental sessions, the Italian broadcasts are temporarily interrupted.

From January 7, 1966, with the commissioning of the Zaghouan transmitter, broadcasts were more regular and the Tunisian press began to publish the RTT program schedule, alongside that of Italian television.

On May 31 of the same year, Tunisian Television, known as RTT (إ ت ت), was officially inaugurated by President Habib Bourguiba. The first announcer to appear on screen in its regular broadcasts was Naziha Maghrebi, whose first appearance was plagued by a small technical issue where the image was upside-down for a few seconds. In 1967, a year after its birth, Tunisian Television broadcast three hours of programs a day: two are in Arabic and one in French. In this context, it is developing cooperation with French-speaking television, in particular Télévision Suisse Romande, which provided it with programs and welcomed trainees in its Geneva studios.

The same year, it broadcasts and retransmits on Mediterranean television the 1967 Mediterranean Games organized in Tunisia. During the first two years of broadcasts, not having a video recorder, the RTT broadcasts its programs, including fiction, live.

The first production vans for color production were acquired in 1975; the channel began to produce color programs at the end of 1976. In 1977, it broadcast in color the 1977 FIFA World Youth Championship organized in Tunis. In June of the same year, the film laboratory of the RTT began to develop color films. The sale of color television sets skyrocketed during the 1978 FIFA World Cup, where Tunisia took part. RTT was renamed RTT 1 in 1983, following the creation of RTT 2. Television advertising started in December 1987.

With the change in the presidency of the republic on November 7, 1987, the channel became TV7 (قناة 7) in 1992, then Tunis 7 in 1997. The regime then intended, through this choice, to associate television with the new political configuration that gets ready. On May 23, 2008, Tunis 7 took the French name of Tunisie 7 until the fall of President Zine el-Abidine Ben Ali.
