= Gafsa Radio =

Gafsa Radio is a public local radio station created on November 7, 1991. It broadcasts from Gafsa city targeting locals of South West Tunisia.

== Content ==
The radio broadcasts 18 hours a day with generic content targeting mainly the audiences of South West Tunisia with diverse programming.

== Broadcast ==
Available only in Southern West of Tunisia. The frequencies vary from region to region. Sometimes the service is available in different frequencies.

- 93.5 MHz
- 91.8 MHz
- 89.2 MHz
- 88.3 MHz

=== Internet ===
The Internet service is not yet available, but there are some recorded programs on the Tunisian Radio website.
