= Radio Tunis Chaîne Internationale =

National radio station in Tunisia

- Tunis; Tunisia
- Broadcast area: Tunisia; Worldwide
- Frequencies: AM, FM, DAB+, Satellite www.rtci.tn/programme
- Branding: RTCI

Programming
- Languages: French, English, Spanish, German and Italian
- Format: AM, FM, DAB+

Ownership
- Owner: State owned (Radio Tunisienne)

History
- First air date: 1939
- Call sign meaning: Tunis International Radio

Links
- Webcast: https://www.rtci.tn/programme
- Website: www.rtci.tn

Radio Tunis Chaîne Internationale (RTCI) is a national radio station in Tunisia, headquartered in the capital city, Tunis. Launched on 15 October 1938, it now broadcasts on 92.0 and 98.2 FM in Tunis. With its nationalization in February 1960, the station was renamed Chaîne internationale de Radio Tunis (International Channel of Radio Tunis) and in 1986, Radio Tunis Chaîne Internationale or more simply RTCI.

Since July 18, 2015, RTCI has been broadcasting its programs 24 hours a day in medium wave (963 kHz from Djedeida).

== Broadcasting ==
RTCI broadcasts on FM; it has also been available via satellite since 1992 and on the Internet since 2007.

RTCI broadcasts through the Eutelsat Hotbird 13G satellite at 12149 MHz, vertical polarization, azimuth 13 degrees east, signal speed: 27,500 MSym/s, Standard: DVB-S, unencrypted signals for Europe. The station is also available online, broadcasts mainly in French, but also in English, Spanish, Italian and German.

She is led by Sondès Ben Khalifa, who was appointed to her position in August 2023.
