= Radio Sfax =

Radio station in Sfax, Tunisia

Coordinates: 34°44′13″N 10°44′45″E

Radio Sfax is an Arabic language radio station in Sfax, Tunisia. The station was established in 1961 and focuses on regional news and issues.

The station is located on Menzel Chaker Road in Sfax, just north of the Stade Taïeb Mhiri. It broadcasts twenty hours each day on MW 720 kHz / 105.21 MHz.

Since 1990, Radio Sfax has maintained a television production department, which contributes programs to the national TV station, RTT.

Tunisian media personality Nizar Chaari worked for Radio Sfax for ten years from 1993 to 2003. He presented many notable shows for the station including Zifef El Athir, Marafi El Ahad (news film and theater) and Founoun (theater arts), Ithnayn ala Alhawa, Rabii Elfounoun (theater) and Website (internet news).
