= ElKef Radio =

El Kef Radio is a public local radio station created on November 7, 1991. It broadcasts from El Kef city targeting locals of North West Tunisia.

== Content ==
The radio broadcasts 18 hours a day with content targeting mainly the audiences of North West Tunisia with diverse programming.

== Broadcast ==
=== FM ===
Available only in Northern West of Tunisia. The frequencies vary from region to region. Sometimes the service is available in different frequencies.

- 102.2 MHz
- 88.2 MHz
- 92.2 MHz
- 96.8 MHz

=== Internet ===
The Internet service is not yet available, but there are some recorded programs on the Tunisian Radio website.

== See also ==
- Tunisia Radio Website
