= Office de Radio et Télévision des Comores =

National broadcaster of the Comoros

ORTC
- Country: Comoros
- Official website: www.ortc.fr

Office de Radio et Télévision des Comores (Comoros Radio and Television Office) or ORTC is the national public radio and television company of the Comoros. It broadcasts a radio station and a television channel in Comorian, French and Arabic: ORTC-TV.

== History ==
On September 1, 1960, the Société de radiodiffusion de la France d'outre-mer (SORAFOM) organized the laying of the first stone of the Radio House in Dzaoudzi, in the Ferme en Petite-Terre district on the island of Mayotte, in what was then the French overseas territory of the Comoros Archipelago. The first Radio Comores broadcasts in the trial phase took place in February 1961 from the Dzaoudzi transmitter.

SORAFOM became the Radio Cooperation Office (OCORA) in 1962, placed under the umbrella of French Radio-Television (R.T.F.). Subsequently, the station belonged to the French Television Radio Broadcasting Office (O.R.T.F.) from June 1964 and left the Farm on October 15, 1967, to set up its studios in Moroni, in Grande-Comore.

Following the breakup of the ORTF on December 31, 1974, and the creation of the new national program company France-Régions 3 responsible for all regional radio and television channels, the station became FR3-Comores on January 6, 1975.

The Federal Islamic Republic of the Comoros having declared its independence on December 14, 1975, the French FR3 teams left the radio's premises in Moroni, which came under Comorian management and once again became Radio Comores, the national radio of the newly independent country. At the same time, the FR3 teams joined Mayotte, which chose to remain French, where they set up the FR3-Mayotte studios in Pamandzi. In 1994, Houmed Msaidié restructured the media sector with the creation of a dedicated information code. Radio Comores is renamed ORTC that year, eyeing the creation of a television service. In 1996, under the government of president Mohamed Taki, ORTC begins its project to implement television broadcasts.

The new headquarters of Radio and Television of the Comoros was inaugurated on September 26, 2002, during the official handing over of the keys of the new building to the country's authorities by the embassy of the People's Republic of China in the Comoros which constructed the building.

ORTC is a member of the Indian Ocean Radio and Television Association (ARTOI), which brings together five other territorial broadcasters: MBC (Mauritius), ORTM (Madagascar), SBC (Seychelles), Réunion 1re and Mayotte 1re (France). In 2013, its gathering was held in Moroni, to create a news exchange operation between the five countries and territories, made effective on November 4 that year. With the help and expertise of Canal France International (CFI), President Azali inaugurated national television on April 27, 2006. Its first news presenters were Faouzia Ali Amir, then Loulou Saïd Islam and Faraanti Athoumani, who were trained by CFI. The first editor-in-chief of ORTC-TV was Ali Moindjie, who had trained in Paris.

In addition to receiving Chinese aid, ORTC's television station relayed programs from CCTV-F, including lifestyle programs, the news and a Mandarin leaning program, Apprendons le chinois ensemble. As of 2009, these programs aired at least two hours a day. Digital terrestrial broadcasts started in 2015.

Currently, there is no other television station in the Comoros, as the legendary opposition channel Djabal TV, Comoros TV and other independent television stations have since closed down.
