= Radio Tunis =

Tunisian national radio station

Tunisia
- Broadcast area: Tunis, Tunisia

Programming
- Language: Arabic

Ownership
- Owner: Radio Tunisienne

Links
- Webcast: Direct
- Website: radionationale.tn

Radio Tunis called Tunisian National Radio (Arabic: الإذاعة الوطنية التونسية) or Radio of Tunisia (إذاعة الجمهورية التونسية), founded in October 1938, is the primary radio station of Tunisia whose offices are located at Tunis.

== History ==
=== Background ===
The broadcasting was developed lately in Tunisia with the appearance of private stations broadcasting from Sfax and Bizerte from 1935 and Tunis from 1937. Philippe Soupault served as the director between 1937 and 1940. The radio's co-tenant inclines listeners to connect to the BBC Radio Rome, Toulouse Radio, Radio Algiers Radio Paris or Radio Bari.

== Filmography ==
- Philippe Soupault à Tunis, film de Frédéric Mitterrand, Les Films F.M., Paris, 1996
