= Radio Monastir =

Radio station in Tunisia

Mounastir Radio is a public local radio created in 3 August 1977. It broadcasts from Mounastir city targeting locals of Centre-East Tunisia.

== Content ==
The radio broadcasts 19.5 hours a day with content targeting mainly the audiences of Centre-East Tunisia with diverse programming.

== Broadcast ==
Mounastir Radio broadcasts on FM in Centre-East Tunisia. The frequencies vary from region to region. Sometimes the service is available in different frequencies. In Mounastir, it is on 106.1 MHz and in Sousse on 99 MHz. It also broadcasts on 603 Kz MW. The internet service is not yet available, but there are some recorded programs on the Tunisian Radio website.
