= Mass media in Zimbabwe =

The media of Zimbabwe has varying amounts of control by successive governments, coming under tight restriction in recent years by the government of Robert Mugabe, particularly during the growing economic and political crisis in the country. The Zimbabwean constitution promotes freedom of the media and expression, however this is hampered by interference and the implementation of strict media laws. In its 2008 report, Reporters Without Borders ranked the Zimbabwean media as 151st out of 173.

== History ==
=== 1965–1980 ===
Following Rhodesia's Unilateral Declaration of Independence (UDI) in 1965, one of the main aims of the protracted political struggle launched by the Zimbabwe African National Union (ZANU) and the Zimbabwe African People's Union (ZAPU) during the Rhodesian Bush War was for a free press. The independent Rhodesian press was also almost universally critical of UDI, and claimed to have been subject to physical intimidation by the authorities. New legislation was also passed declaring it illegal to print statements "likely to cause alarm, fear, or despondency among readers". In the 1970s, criticism was leveled at Rhodesia's Official Secrets Act, which made it a crime to publish articles related to "classified information" and the Law and Order Maintenance Act (LOMA), which allowed the state to impose exceptionally heavy sentences on those who violated the ban. Such acts were used to impose a media blackout on journalists reporting on allegedly excessive losses or setbacks suffered by the Rhodesian Security Forces as the bush war intensified. Media was ordered to focus on casualties among guerrillas and to report on their retreats to Zambia and Mozambique.

Shortly after the Lancaster House Conference, media restrictions were again revised. Censorship of the foreign press ended, although the Joint Operations Command retained the power to apply internal media blackouts at its discretion. This was protected by Section 42a of the Law and Order Maintenance Act, and when general elections were held in February 1980 nothing had been done to alter it. Nevertheless, the security forces were also forbidden to abuse the legislation by banning the publication of political material. The Rhodesian government had also issued a number of "D Notices", which revoked publishing rights to photographs of two candidates, Joshua Nkomo and Robert Mugabe, except through official sanction. These remained in force during the election.

=== 1980–1999 ===
After Mugabe's victory in the 1980 election, the new Republic of Zimbabwe did not implement the proposed media reforms carried over from the Rhodesian years, which were instead seen as useful for disseminating information approved by the government. The only act to be repealed was the Powers, Privileges, and Immunities of Parliament Act, which had made it illegal for media to report on debates in parliament. In January 1981, the government set up the Zimbabwe Mass Media Trust (ZMMT) as part of the government's new media policy, under widespread criticism of the national media, which at the time was inherited from foreign control. It was originally intended to serve as an authority to oversee the transition of the media from white minority control to Zimbabwean society as a whole and to regulate the media. The government emphasised that the media be free, non-partisan, mass-orientated and serve the national interest; however, a growing presence of the Ministry of Information into the media effected its original function.

Despite difficult working conditions for the media, they had contributed to improved governance in Zimbabwe. In 1987, despite threats from the Zimbabwe National Army where the disease was taking its toll, the Financial Gazette newspaper published its first article on AIDS. The topic was vigorously covered in the private media, which later led to the government's decision to facilitate maximum publicity and education on the disease. Around the late 1980s, while the government was favouring a one-party state based on its alliances with other communist states, independent media launched a campaign against this style of governance, which was later joined by the public, churches and opposition groups. By 1988, the concept was abandoned and continued in its multi-party form. In 1989, Chronicle editors Geoffrey Nyarota and Davison Maruziva exposed what was known as the Willowgate scandal which exposed corruption of the authorities during a shortage of foreign currency in Zimbabwe. It emerged that foreign vehicles were sold at cheaper prices compared to the public which were sold the vehicles at highly inflated prices. Media coverage led to the resignation of six government officials, one of whom later committed suicide. This was followed by further scandals in the 1990s which involved the looting of funds set aside for government projects by government officials, which the media brought to the attention of parliament. The government responded with corrective actions, though not all of the suspects were punished. The looting of diamonds in the Democratic Republic of the Congo by the Zimbabwe National Army on a peacekeeping mission also led to a national investigation.

A decline in popularity of the government in the late 1990s and growing instability saw the emergence of independent newspapers critical of the government, including the Financial Gazette, Daily News and The Standard. The independent press competed with the more dominant state media, particularly the Zimbabwe Broadcasting Corporation, which is currently the sole TV and radio broadcaster in the country. The emergence of this new media, along with civic groups and opposition parties, successfully changed government policy from a one-party state to a multi-party system.

=== 1999-present ===
All news media in the country are careful to reflect the government line when reporting by self-censorship. Private press was common and still exists, however since the 2002 Access to Information and Protection of Privacy Act (AIPPA) was passed, (which replaced LOMA from 40 years earlier) a number of outlets were shut down by the government, including The Daily News the same year. As a result, many press organisations have been set up in both neighbouring and Western countries by exiled Zimbabweans. However, because the internet is currently unrestricted, many Zimbabweans are allowed to access online news sites set up by exiled journalists. Reporters Without Borders claims the media in Zimbabwe involves "surveillance, threats, imprisonment, censorship, blackmail, abuse of power and denial of justice are all brought to bear to keep firm control over the news." Opposition views are often skewed, scantly covered or not mentioned in the state media, which has also criticised demonstrations and strikes against the government. Until July 2009, a Zambian newspaper, The Post, was the only foreign newspaper allowed to work in the country, along with the Associated Press, Agence France-Presse, Al Jazeera and SABC news agencies.

After a power sharing deal was agreed by ZANU–PF and the opposition MDC in February 2009, Morgan Tsvangirai announced he was to "democratise" the state media and repeal many strict laws in order for the media to have a more meaningful role in the rebuilding of the country. The MDC had accused the state media of "gutter journalism" and biased reporting against the party. In April 2009, the coalition government planned to review media restrictions, including the removal of bans for some foreign news agencies and to create a new media commission to issue licences. ZANU–PF Minister of Justice Patrick Chinamasa said there was an "agreement to review the media policy so as to create a political climate where divergent voices will be heard." The media environment is slowly improving in Zimbabwe; on July 28, 2009, Zimbabwean journalists set up a rights body, the Zimbabwe Journalists for Human Rights to defend media freedom in the country and the establishment of a new government body, the Zimbabwe Media Commission to replace the defunct Media and Information Commission. Three papers – the previously banned Daily News, Financial Gazette and NewsDay were to relaunch. A licence was issued to the Associated Newspapers of Zimbabwe (ANZ) that publishes Daily News which the government previously banned, was now free to operate. The Daily News newspaper re-appeared again on March 18, 2011, with its first article questioning whether Robert Mugabe should continue to rule at the age of 87.

== Relations with foreign media and governments ==
The Zimbabwean press at times has strained relations with foreign press and governments. Governments from neighbouring countries such as Botswana and Zambia, as well as Tanzania who have a tense relationship with Zimbabwe, have regularly protested against attacks on their countries by Zimbabwean state media. The government also banned many foreign broadcasting stations from Zimbabwe, including the BBC, CNN, Sky News, CBC, Australian Broadcasting Corporation, Channel Four, ABC, NBC and Fox News. However, restrictions were lifted in July 2009, meaning the BBC and CNN could again operate in the country, however other aforementioned Western news media organizations are still forbidden to operate. News agencies and newspapers from other Western countries and South Africa have also been banned from the country. Other stations that were allowed into Zimbabwe, such as Al Jazeera, were told to be "more objective" in their reporting by the Zimbabwean government during the presidential election.

Rising media fees for reporting in the country have also caused condemnation from foreign journalists claiming that freedom of expression will deteriorate. The Ministry of Information claimed the rising costs were necessary to prevent foreign journalists for "distorting stories".

== Newspapers ==
Zimbabwe is host to some of the oldest newspapers in Africa; The Herald, Zimbabwe's major newspaper, replaced the Mashonaland and Zambesian Times, which was present from the late 1890s. The Herald, once an influential paper, has seen a decline in readership from 132,000 to between 50,000 and 100,000 in recent years. The influential Daily News, which regularly published criticism of the government, was shut down in 2002, however its director Wilf Mbanga started The Zimbabwean soon after to continue challenging the Mugabe regime. It was restarted in May 2010. The first daily independent Zimbabwean daily newspaper, following Daily News, NewsDay, started publishing in 2010. Journalists can be fired by the Ministry of Information if content is deemed inappropriate. Other notable Zimbabwean newspapers in print include The Chronicle (Zimbabwe), The Financial Gazette, the Zimbabwe Independent, and the Zimbabwe Daily News.

Newspapers are less readily available in the countryside, where radio is the main source of news.

== Television and radio ==
Since the introduction of TV services in the country in the year 1960, there has only been 1 local free to air television channel, which is owned by the government. In November 2020, the Broadcasting Authority of Zimbabwe granted free to air, national commercial TV broadcasting licences to 6 private companies after shortlisting 14 applicants, breaking the national broadcaster's 60 year old TV monopoly. The regulator gave the 6 successful applicants 18 months to begin broadcasting.

TV stations that were awarded licences include the Bulawayo based FairTalk Communications' KeYona TV, ZimPapers Limited's ZTN (Zimpapers Television Network) (now known as ZTN Prime), Rusununguko Media's NRTV (Nkululeko Rusununguko Television), Jester Media's 3K TV (now known as 3Ktv), Acacia Media Group's Kumba TV and Channel Dzimbahwe's Channel D. Unsuccessful applicants include AB Communications' Flex TV, Alpha Media Holdings' HStv, Blackbury Enterprises (Pvt) Ltd's Blackbury TV, Conduit Investments (Pvt) Ltd's Conduit TV Station, Just in Time TV (Pvt) Ltd's JIT TV, Medianet Productions (Pvt) Ltd's Sunrise TV and Meditation Investments (Pvt)'s Zim News Channel.

Satellite stations are received in the country unrestricted, mainly through DStv, a digital satellite television and radio distributor. Zimbabwe transmits analogue terrestrial television on the VHF band, with digital not yet deployed as of 2019. Coverage in rural areas is low, due to poor infrastructure. Overall, 30% of the population receives broadcasts by the ZBC, so radio is the main source of information. In 2006, a parliamentary committee in Zimbabwe called for an opening up of the broadcast media. Chinese technology has been used to jam frequencies used by foreign based radio stations in South Africa, the US and the UK that criticise the government. The vast majority of the media is practically propaganda, all of it either eulogises Mugabe, features pan-African programming, and heavily spreads anti-British and anti-American sentiment on its TV and radio programming.

There are 16 local radio stations, 6 of those are broadcasting nationally and the other 10 are provincial. The public broadcaster owns 4 national and 2 regional radio stations. In 2012 two national private radio stations, Star FM and ZiFM Stereo were launched. StarFM is owned by the government-controlled Zimpapers. It offers political discussion from a heavily pro-government perspective and an expanded entertainment schedule. ZiFM, owned by ZANU–PF MP Supa Mandiwanzira is more focused on entertainment although it also offers political and social opinion programmes that are heavily weighted towards pro-government positions. The two stations are seen as direct competition to ZBC's youth orientated urban radio station, Power FM.

In 2015, the Broadcasting Authority of Zimbabwe (BAZ) granted broadcasting licences to 8 regional radio stations which included Bulawayo's Skyz Metro FM and Harare's Capitalk 100.4 FM, to mention a few. All the 8 radio stations were successfully operational by the end of 2017 despite the tough economic challenges. In 2018, state owned ZBC further added 2 more regional radio stations, Khulumani FM and 95.8 Central Radio in Bulawayo and Gweru respectively.

In the presidential elections in 2008, the media gave significantly more coverage to the ruling party, ZANU–PF, and rarely showed opposition broadcasts. It was also criticised for inciting violence against the opposition.

== Internet ==
Internet use is unrestricted by the government as 10.955% of the population are able to access it, due to high costs. However, this is one of the highest rates of usage in Africa. Due to the unrestricted nature of the internet, foreign based Zimbabwean papers and news sites are accessible from inside Zimbabwe. The government has considered monitoring emails and restricting internet sites for the purposes of "national security", but currently this is not in place. In 2007, according to the CIA World Factbook, 1.35 million Zimbabweans were able to access the internet. Currently, there are 27 Internet service providers in Zimbabwe, reflecting the growing usage of the internet.

== See also ==
- Telecommunications in Zimbabwe
- Censorship and Entertainment Control Act, 1967
- List of Zimbabwean writers

== Bibliography ==
- N.C.G. Mathema: Newspapers in Zimbabwe. Multimedia Publications, Lusaka, 2001. ISBN 998230111X
