= List of radio stations in Zimbabwe =

The following terrestrial radio stations are licensed to broadcast in Zimbabwe. Radio stations provide access to information to the Zimbabwean people most of which reside in rural areas. This was particularly important during the Covid 19 Lockdown since people were restricted from moving

== National ==
- Classic 263
- Radio Zimbabwe
- Power FM
- National FM
- Star FM
- ZiFM Stereo

== Regional and Provincial ==
- Skyz Metro FM - Bulawayo 100.3 MHz
- Khulumani FM - Bulawayo 95.0 MHz
- 95.8 Central Radio - Gweru 95.8 MHz
- 98.4 Midlands - Gweru 98.4 MHz
- Breeze FM 91.2 - Victoria Falls 91.2 MHz
- YAFM - Zvishavane 91.8 MHz
- Capitalk 100.4 FM - Harare 100.4 MHz
- Hevoi FM - Masvingo 100.2 MHz
- Diamond FM - Mutare 103.8 MHz
- Nyaminyami FM - Kariba 94.5 MHz

== Community Radio ==
- Ntepe-Manama Radio 97.0 MHz - Manama, Gwanda
- Lyeja FM 107.3MHz - Hwange, Vic Falls
- Ingqanga FM 92.4 MHz - Mbembesi
- Radio Bukalanga 100.9 MHz - Plumtree (Empandeni, Ndolwane)
- Bayethe FM 107.6 MHz -Matobo (Mangwe, Brunapeg, Maphisa)
- Lotsha FM 90.1 MHz - Beitbridge, Shashi
- Twasumbuka FM 99.7MHz - Binga, (Kamativi, Siabuwa)
- Kasambabezi FM 99.3 MHz - Kariba, Mapongola
- Nyangani FM 99.5 MHz - Nyanga (Rukotso, Susamoya)
- Avuxeni FM 93.9 MHz - Chiredzi (Chikombedzi 97.3 MHz, Rutenga 104.3 MHz, Mahenye, Malipati 90.7 MHz)
- Chimanimani FM 100 MHz - Chimanimani (Gwendingwe, Rusitu)
- Vemuganga FM 96.0 MHz - Chipinge (Checheche, Chibuwe)
- Ndau FM 96.0 MHz - Mahenye (Garahwa)
- Madziwa FM 91.4 MHz - Shamva

== Campus Radio ==
- nust.fm 101.1 MHz - Bulawayo
- Solusi FM 93.8 MHz - Bulawayo
- LSU Radio 97.8 MHz - Lupane
- MSU Radio 101.7 MHz - Gweru (Zvishavane 90.3MHz)
- GZU Campus Radio 89.5 MHz - Masvingo (Mashava 100.4 MHz, Chiredzi 90.0 MHz)
- PaChikomo 98.6 FM - Harare
- H-Poly 88.6 FM - Harare
- CUT FM 105.8 MHz - Chinhoyi

== Internet/Webcast only ==
- Heart and Soul Broadcasting
- Nehanda Radio
- Zim Net Radio
- Zim Net Radio Gospel
- Praise 105.2 Radio
- YP Radio
- Radio VOP
- Shaya FM
- Remnant Tunes
- Pamtengo Radio
- Radio54 African Panorama
- AfroZim Radio
- After5Radio
- SW Radio Africa
- UFO Trap Station
- Channel 2 Fm

== Awards ==
Radio houses are also eligible to awards in Zimbabwe, to appreciate the contributions made. Radio is also regarded as part of the media industry in Zimbabwe and some radio presenters also receive awards. Bulawayo hosts ROIL BYO Awards media awards annually.

== See also ==
- Telecommunications in Zimbabwe
- Censorship and Entertainment Control Act, 1967
- List of Zimbabwean writers
- Zimbabwe Broadcasting Corporation
