= List of newspapers in Zimbabwe =

Zimbabwe is host to some of the oldest newspapers in Africa; The Herald, Zimbabwe's major newspaper, replaced the Mashonaland and Zambesian Times, which was present from the late 1890s. The Herald has seen a decline in readership from 132,000 to between 50,000 and 100,000 in recent years. The influential Daily News, which regularly published criticism of the government, was shut down in 2002, however its director Wilf Mbanga started The Zimbabwean soon after to continue challenging the Mugabe regime. The first daily independent Zimbabwean daily newspaper, following Daily News, NewsDay, started publishing in 2010. Journalists can be fired by the Ministry of Information if content is deemed inappropriate. Other notable Zimbabwean newspapers in print include The Chronicle, The Financial Gazette, the Zimbabwe Independent, and the Zimbabwe Daily News.

== Daily newspapers ==
Newspaper	Founded	Location	Ownership	Circulation	Type	Language
The Anchor	2019	Harare	Private		Daily	English
Business Weekly			Private		Weekly	English
The Chronicle	1894	Bulawayo	Government		Daily	English
Daily News	1999	Harare	Private	100,000+	Daily	English
The Financial Gazette		Harare	Private	50,000+	Weekly	English
The Harare Tribune	2001	Harare	Private		Online daily	English
The Herald	1892	Harare	Government	50,000+	Daily	English
Kwayedza		Harare	Government		Weekly	Shona
The Manica Post		Mutare	Government			English
The Midlands Observer		Kwekwe	Government			English, Ndebele
NewsDay	2010	Harare	Private		Daily	English
Harare Mirror	2023	Harare	Private		Daily	English
News Report Zimbabwe	2018	Harare	Private		Weekly	English
Southern Eye	2013	Harare	Private		Daily	English
The Standard		Harare	Private		Weekly	English
The Sunday Mail		Harare	Government		Weekly	English
uMthunywa		Bulawayo	Government		Weekly	Ndebele
DailyTimes Zimbabwe		Harare	Private		Online daily	English
Zimbabwe Daily News	2004		Private		Online daily	English
Zimbabwe Independent		Harare	Private		Weekly	English
The Zimbabwe Mail	2003	Harare	Private		Daily	English
Zimbabwe Metro	2007	Gaborone, Botswana	Private		Online daily	English
Zimbabwe Telegraph	2008		Private		Daily	English
Zimbabwe Tribune	2009		Private		Online daily	English
The Zimbabwean	2005		Private		Weekly	English

== Defunct newspapers ==
- British South Africa Company Government Gazette (1894–1923)
- The Central African Examiner (1957–1965)
- Evening Standard (until 1962), merged into The Herald
- The Gatooma Mail
- The Gweru Times (1895–2015)
- Mashonaland Herald and Zambesian Times (1891–1892), succeeded by The Rhodesia Herald
- Masvingo Star (ceased publication 2015)
- The National Observer
- The Northern Optimist (1894–1895), succeeded by The Gweru Times
- Pungwe News (ceased publication 2015)
- Rhodesian Advertiser

== See also ==
- Media of Zimbabwe
