= Edna Machirori =

- Born: Edna; Jigjiga
- Citizenship: Zimbabwean
- Education: New York Institute of Technology
- Occupations: journalist, news editor
- Employers: The Financial Gazette; African Daily News; Zimbabwe Council of Churches; The Chronicle
- Notable work: The Chronicle
- Awards: IWMF Lifetime Achievement Award

Edna Machirori is a Zimbabwean journalist. She was the first black woman news editor in Zimbabwe, as news editor of The Chronicle, and the first black woman editor of a mainstream Zimbabwean newspaper, as editor-in-chief of The Financial Gazette. In 2013 she won an IWMF Lifetime Achievement Award.

== Life ==
While at school Machirori started writing letters to the editor at the nationalist African Daily News, and in 1963 joined the newspaper as a cadet journalist. At that time she was the first woman on the newspaper's staff, and started a new women's page there, before colonial authorities banned the paper in 1964.

In 1974 Machirori left Zimbabwe on a scholarship to study at the New York Institute of Technology, gaining a BA in Communications in 1979. She worked as a media officer for the Zimbabwe Council of Churches, before returning to journalism as a senior reporter at The Chronicle.There she rose through the ranks, eventually becoming news editor. In 1988, under her leadership, the paper broke the Willowgate scandal, an investigation into ZANU-PF corruption, which led to the resignation of five cabinet ministers and subsequent newspaper censorship in Zimbabwe.

In 2004 Machirori became features editor at The Financial Gazette, writing two political columns, 'Africa File' and 'Personal Glimpses' under a pseudonym. In 2006 ZANU-PF officials uncovered her identity and subjected her to personal and political attack.

Machirori is a freelance writer for several Zimbabwean publications. She is on the board of the Voluntary Media Council of Zimbabwe and on the jury of the Federation of African Media Women in Zimbabwe.

One of Machirori's daughters, Fungai, is also a journalist, founder of the blog Her Zimbabwe.
