= Callistus Ndlovu =

Zimbabwean politician (1936–2019)

Minister of Industry and Technology
- In office July 1985 – 13 April 1989
- Prime Minister: Robert Mugabe
- Preceded by: Robert Mugabe
- Succeeded by: Kumbirai Kangai (as Minister of Industry and Commerce)

Minister of Mines
- In office January 1984 – July 1985
- Prime Minister: Robert Mugabe
- Preceded by: Maurice Nyagumbo
- Succeeded by: Richard Hove

Minister of Construction
- In office April 1982 – January 1984
- Prime Minister: Robert Mugabe
- Preceded by: Clement Muchachi (as Minister of Works)
- Succeeded by: Simbarashe Mumbengegwi

Member of the Senate
- In office 1985–1990
- Constituency: Matabeleland North Province

Member of Parliament
- In office 13 May 1980 – 1985
- Constituency: Matabeleland South Province

Personal details
- Born: 9 February 1936 Plumtree, Southern Rhodesia (now Zimbabwe)
- Died: 13 February 2019 (aged 83) Krugersdorp, South Africa
- Resting place: National Heroes' Acre
- Party: NDP (1960–1961); ZAPU (1963–1984); ZANU (1984–1987); ZANU–PF (after 1987)
- Spouse: Angeline Ndlovu
- Children: 7
- Education: Pius XII Catholic University College (BA); New York University (MA); Stony Brook University (PhD)

Callistus Dingiswayo Ndlovu (9 February 1936 – 13 February 2019) was a Zimbabwean academic, diplomat, and politician. He joined the Zimbabwe African People's Union (ZAPU) in 1963 as a teacher in Matabeleland, and went on to serve as its representative to the United Nations and North America in the 1970s. After Zimbabwe's independence in 1980, he was a member of the House of Assembly from 1980 to 1985 and served as a senator from 1985 to 1990. He left ZAPU and joined the ruling ZANU–PF party in 1984.

Ndlovu held several portfolios in Prime Minister Robert Mugabe's cabinet in the 1980s, serving as Minister of Construction from 1982 to 1984, Minister of Mines from 1984 to 1985, and Minister of Industry and Technology between 1985 and 1989. In 1989, he was implicated in the Willowgate corruption scandal and resigned from the cabinet after being accused of lying to the official panel investigating the allegations. He ran unsuccessfully for Parliament in 2000 and again for the Senate in 2013, and served on the ZANU–PF Central Committee and as the party's provincial chairman for Bulawayo. He died in 2019 in South Africa, where he was being treated for cancer.

== Early life and education ==
Callistus Dingiswayo Ndlovu was born on 9 February 1936 in Plumtree, a town near the western border of what was then Southern Rhodesia. He grew up in a Kalanga family of four. As a boy, Ndlovu herded cattle and often harvested mopane worms to pay for his schooling. He attended Empandeni High School, a Catholic mission school in Plumtree, where he earned his junior certificate and began training as a teacher. After the training, he started a correspondence course through the Joint Matriculation Board of South Africa. After completing matric, he taught from 1959 to 1961 at the Empandeni mission, first at the primary school and later at the high school. He then taught Mafakela Primary School in Bulawayo in 1962.

In 1963, Ndlovu entered Pius XII Catholic University College in Basutoland (now Lesotho), where he graduated in 1965 with a Bachelor of Arts in economics, history, and Zulu. While a student, he served as president of the university's Student Representative Council from 1963 to 1964, and as the publicity secretary of the National Union of Basutoland Students from 1964 to 1965. He went on to earn a Master of Arts in history from New York University in 1969, followed by a Doctor of Philosophy in history from the State University of New York at Stony Brook in 1973. His doctoral dissertation was titled Missionaries and Traders in the Ndebele Kingdom.

== Academic career and revolutionary activity ==
In 1960, Ndlovu joined the National Democratic Party, an African nationalist party founded by Joshua Nkomo. In 1963, while a student at Pius XII Catholic University College, he joined the Zimbabwe African People's Union (ZAPU), and became chairman of the party's branch in Basutoland. After completing his bachelor's degree, Ndlovu returned to Rhodesia, where he taught economics and Zulu at Mpopoma High School in Bulawayo in 1966 and 1967, and was elected president of the African Teachers' Association in Matabeleland. While a teacher, was detained for three months at Khami prison by the Rhodesian government for promoting ZAPU politics.

Upon release, Ndlovu left Rhodesia for New York, where he studied towards his MA and PhD on an Aggrey Fellowship. Between 1969 and 1980, he was an associate professor of history and political science and director of the African Studies Institute at Hofstra University on Long Island. He received an award for distinguished teaching in 1973, and was granted Freedom of the City by Minneapolis in 1973. While in the United States, Ndlovu served as ZAPU's chairman for North America from 1967 to 1971, and was a member of the party's Revolutionary Council from 1971 to 1980. From 1973 to 1979, he was ZAPU's chief representative to the United Nations, and opened an office for the party near the United Nations headquarters in Manhattan. Ndlovu attended the 1976 Geneva Conference and the 1979 Lancaster House Conference as a political advisor to the Patriotic Front delegations. During the liberation struggle, Ndlovu often made trips to ZAPU camps in Zambia, where he was responsible for ensuring supplies of medicine, books, and other necessities, which he obtained with the support of the African-American Institute.

== Post-independence political career ==
Ndlovu returned to Zimbabwe at independence in 1980, and worked as a director at Carbin Finance and as a group industrial relations manager with Union Carbide. In the 1980 election, he earned a seat in the House of Assembly as an MP for Matabeleland South Province, and served as a member of ZAPU's Central Committee between 1980 and 1983. On 16 April 1982, he was named Minister of Construction by Prime Minister Robert Mugabe, replacing Clement Muchachi, who resigned as Minister of Works after ZAPU leader Joshua Nkomo was sacked from the cabinet. His appointment strained the already difficult relations between Nkomo and Ndlovu, who in previous instances had opposed Nkomo at party councils, and who had chaired a parliamentary committee enquiring into Nkomo's and ZAPU's companies. In May 1982, ZAPU's publicity secretary announced on behalf of the party's Central Committee that the appointments of Ndlovu and two other ZAPU officials to the cabinet "did not have the blessing of the party," because they were made without Mugabe consulting ZAPU leadership. At a party meeting in Bulawayo on 8 May 1982, Ndlovu defended his decision to join Mugabe's cabinet and accused ZAPU leadership of employing a double standard for refusing to support his appointment, as the party had approved the appointment of three other ZAPU ministers in the past.

On 3 January 1984, Mugabe reshuffled his cabinet, and Ndlovu was appointed to replace Maurice Nyagumbo as Minister of Mines. On 14 April 1984, Ndlovu announced his resignation from ZAPU. The following month, on 16 May, he announced he had joined the ruling party, ZANU, a move commended by Prime Minister Mugabe and described as "opportunistic" by ZAPU leader Joshua Nkomo. That year, Ndlovu became ZANU's provincial chairman for Bulawayo, an office he held until 1987. In the 1985 election, Ndlovu ran as ZANU's candidate in his home constituency of Bulilima–Mangwe, losing with 923 votes against 31,334 votes for ZAPU's Isaac Nyathi. He was then appointed to represent Matabeleland North Province in the Senate, where he served until 1990. On 15 July 1985, following the election, Mugabe announced a new cabinet in which Ndlovu was named Minister of Industry and Technology.

Ndlovu was implicated in the 1988–1989 Willowgate scandal in which The Bulawayo Chronicle revealed the illegal resale of automobiles at inflated prices on the black market by senior government officials, who had been given early access to purchase them from an assembly plant in Willowvale, Harare. When The Chronicle first published the revelations in 1988, Ndlovu had called the reporting "a shoddy piece of slander conceived by tricksters and mobsters." He ultimately resigned on 13 April 1989 along with several other senior officials after being accused of lying to the official commission appointed by Prime Minister Mugabe to investigate the allegations. Announcing the resignations the following day, Mugabe told reporters Ndlovu and the other officials had been seduced by "the evils of the capitalist system we still have," but said, "I am still proud of them. All these men are good men, by and large." Ndlovu was replaced by Bernard Chidzero as acting industry minister, then by Kumbirai Kangai in 1990.

== Later life and death ==
After resigning, Ndlovu returned to the private sector, working in 1990 as an executive consultant with the Treger Group of Companies and in 1991 as chief executive officer at Calding Consultants. He also worked for the Zimbabwe Institute of Public Administration and Management (ZIPAM) for several years and spent much of his time farming. Ndlovu was a member of the commission that drafted a proposed new Zimbabwean constitution, which was defeated by voters in the 2000 constitutional referendum. He attempted a return to parliament in the 2000 election, standing for ZANU–PF in the Bulawayo South constituency, but lost with 3,192 votes to Movement for Democratic Change candidate David Coltart's 20,380 votes.

Ndlovu was chairman of the board of directors of the cellular network operator Net*One and headed the founding task force of Gwanda State University, a new government university established in Matabeleland South Province in 2012. In 2013, he won the ZANU–PF primary in the Khumalo constituency, and was included on the party list of Senate candidates in Bulawayo. However, ZANU–PF received just 23.8% of the vote in Bulawayo in the 2013 election, and Ndlovu did not receive a Senate seat, which were allotted using proportional representation. He continued to serve on the ZANU–PF Central Committee and as the party's provincial chairman for Bulawayo until his death.

Ndlovu died on 13 February 2019 at Netcare Pinehaven Hospital in Krugersdorp, South Africa, where he had been undergoing chemotherapy for pancreatic cancer. Following his death, ZANU–PF's Bulawayo province requested he be declared a national hero, which was approved unanimously by the party's politburo two days later. In a statement, President Emmerson Mnangagwa described Ndlovu as "a principled and disciplined cadre who was always prepared to sacrifice for the greater good of our people" Ndlovu's body arrived by plane in Zimbabwe from South Africa on 19 February, and passed through the Mzilikazi Barracks, then a funeral home for services, and finally was taken to his home in the Bulawayo suburb of Kumalo. The following day, his body was flown on an Air Force helicopter to his rural home in Sanzukwi village near Brunapeg. There, hundreds of mourners and government and party officials gathered to view his body, before it was flown back to Bulawayo lay in state at his home the next day. On 22 February, a Catholic funeral service was held at St. Mary's Cathedral Basilica, followed by a service at Bulawayo City Hall. His body was then flown to Harare, and was buried at the National Heroes' Acre the next day. Ndlovu is survived by his wife Angeline and seven children.
