= Chipo Sabeta =

Zimbabwean journalist

- Born: Glenora, Harare
- Citizenship: Zimbabwe
- Years active: Sport Journalist

Chipo Sabeta is a media personality, sports journalist and sports administrator. In 2020, she was Awarded FIFA/CIES sports management network project winner (Worldwide). She is the first Zimbabwean female journalists to be included in the FIFA Ballon d'Or voting panel since 2014.

== Career ==
Chipo was born in Nyanga, Zimbabwe, but grew up in Glen Norah suburb in Harare, where she had her early education before proceeding to Nhowe Mission School in Macheke. Chipo Sabeta was of the founding journalists for Zimbabwe’s first tabloid, The H Metro in 2009, she grew up the ranks within the organisation then became Senior Sports Reporter for ZIMPAPERS which houses H-Metro, The Herald, ZTN, The Chronicle, Star FM Zimbabwe and Business Weekly from 2010 to 2019. In 2022 she was formally awarded the FIFA/CIES award which she won through Nelson Mandela University at FIFA headquarters by Arsène Wenger. She is also the editor of The African Gazette magazine.

In 2023, she was appointed as the Africa Cup of Nations UK (ANCUK) communication executive.
