= Davison Maruziva =

Zimbabwean journalist and editor

Davison Maruziva is a Zimbabwean journalist and editor. Along with Geoffrey Nyarota, he broke the 1989 "Willowgate" scandal that resulted in the resignation of five government ministers, but was forced from his job with the state-owned Bulawayo Chronicle as a result. He later was an editor at Nyarota's Daily News, but resigned after Nyarota was forced out in December 2002. He then became an editor at the Independent Standard, and attracted international attention for his 2008 arrest for publishing an editorial by an opposition leader.

== Background ==
Maruziva has a degree in journalism from a British university.

== "Willowgate" scandal ==
In 1989, he worked at the state-owned Bulawayo Chronicle under Geoffrey Nyarota. The paper built a reputation for aggressive investigations into corruption at all levels of government, and Nyarota became "something of a hero". In the "Willowgate" investigation, Maruziva and Nyarota reported that ministers and officials from the government of President Robert Mugabe had been given early access to buy foreign cars at an assembly plant in Willowvale, an industrial suburb of Harare. In some cases, the cars were bought wholesale and resold at a 200% profit. The newspaper published documents from the plant to prove its case, including identification numbers from the vehicles.

Mugabe appointed a three-person panel, the Sandura Commission, to investigate the allegations. The Washington Post reported that the commission's hearings "struck a deep chord" in Zimbabwe, where citizens had grown to resent the perceived growing corruption of government. Five of Mugabe's cabinet ministers eventually resigned due to implication in the scandal, including Defense Minister Enos Nkala and Maurice Nyagumbo, the third highest-ranking official in Mugabe's party, the Zimbabwe African National Union (ZANU).

However, Maruziva and Nyarota were both forced out of their jobs with the state-owned paper and into newly created public relations positions in Harare. Though the men were given pay raises, Mugabe also stated that the move was a result of their "overzealousness", leading to public belief that they had been removed for their reporting. ZANU parliamentarians also criticised Maruziva and Nyarota, with the Minister of State for National Security stating that criticism was welcome, but "to the extent that the press now deliberately target Government as their enemy, then we part ways."

== Daily News ==
In 1999, Nyarota founded the Daily News, an independent daily newspaper, and Maruziva rejoined him as its assistant editor. The paper stated that it would be neither "pro-government" nor "anti-government", but would "be a medium for vibrant discourse among the divergent political, social, religious and other groups of Zimbabwe", as well as fight for press freedom and freedom of speech. Its first issue appeared on 21 March 1999. The newspaper's motto was "Telling it like it is".

Within a year, the newspaper had passed the circulation of the state-owned Herald, with a daily circulation of 105,000 copies; the Herald's circulation was reported to have fallen by 50% during the same period. President Mugabe accused the paper of being a "mouthpiece" for the Movement for Democratic Change (MDC), a political coalition opposed to his rule, while the paper asserted that it was independent and criticised both parties.

On 22 April 2000, a bomb was thrown into the paper's offices, but no one was hurt. South African Associated Press photographer Obed Zilwa was arrested for the attack, but the newspaper alleged that agents of Mugabe's security forces had thrown the bomb. Zilwa was released without charge 48 hours later. In January 2001, the News building was bombed again, this time destroying its printing presses. According to the Committee to Protect Journalists, "credible sources" linked the Zimbabwean military to the attack.

On 30 December 2002, Nyarota resigned as editor of the Daily News, to avoid his firing by the paper's new executive chair. Maruziva resigned shortly after in protest. The paper was shut down by the government in September 2003.

== Independent Standard ==
Maruziva later became editor of the Harare newspaper Independent Standard. In May 2008, he was arrested in the paper's office for having printed an article in April by Arthur Mutambara, leader of an MDC faction and charged with publishing "false statements prejudicial to the state". Later that year, Maruziva stated that Zimbabwe still had freedom of expression; the problem was that "There is no freedom after expression".
