= Zimpapers =

Zimbabwean newspaper company

Zimbabwe Newspapers
- Trade name: Zimpapers
- Formerly: Rhodesian Printing and Publishing Company (1927–1980)
- Type: Public company
- Industry: Mass media
- Founded: 8 March 1927; 99 years ago
- Headquarters: Harare, Zimbabwe
- Area served: Southern Africa
- Key people: Pikirayi Deketeke (GCE)
- Owner: Zimbabwe Mass Media Trust (51%)
- Website: herald.co.zw/about-zimpapers

Zimbabwe Newspapers (1980) Limited, operating as Zimpapers, is a state-controlled Zimbabwean mass media company. Originally a newspaper Publishing company, in the 2010s it expanded its operations to include commercial printing, radio and television. The company's portfolio includes over a dozen Magazines and newspapers, including The Herald and The Chronicle, several radio stations, and a television network. It is the largest newspaper publisher in Zimbabwe.

Zimpapers traces its origins to 1891, when William Fairbridge established the Mashonaland Herald and Zambesian Times on behalf of the South African Argus Printing and Publishing Company. Argus spun its Southern Rhodesia newspapers into the Rhodesian Printing and Publishing Company and went public on 8 March 1927, making Zimpapers one of the oldest listings on the Zimbabwe Stock Exchange. The company was renamed upon Rhodesia's independence as Zimbabwe in 1980, and the Zimbabwean government acquired majority ownership in the company. The government established the Zimbabwe Mass Media Trust (ZMMT) to oversee the country's newspapers under an independent board. The ZMMT was disbanded in 2000, and the company's newspapers are now largely seen as government mouthpieces.

== Overview ==
Zimpapers publishes over a dozen Newspapers and Magazines, including the two leading Daily newspapers in Zimbabwe, The Herald in Harare and The Chronicle in Bulawayo. Other publications include Zimbabwe's leading tabloid, H-Metro https://www.hmetro.co.zw/, the Manicaland regional newspaper, The Manica Post, two Sunday supplements, The Sunday Mail and The Sunday News, and two newspapers in Zimbabwe's main indigenous languages, the Shona-language Kwayedza and the Ndebele-language uMthunywa. In addition to its newspapers, Zimpapers also publishes two magazines, Bridal Magazine, which focuses on Weddings, and Zimtravel, which covers tourism. The Southern Times, a regional newspaper in Southern Africa, is published as a joint venture between Zimpapers and New Era Newspapers of Namibia. Zimpapers is headquartered at Herald House in Harare and maintains offices in Harare, Bulawayo, Mutare, and Gweru, with bureaux located across Zimbabwe. Zimpapers publications are printed in Harare and Bulawayo.

== History ==
=== Origins and Rhodesia years, 1891–1980 ===
Zimpapers traces its origins to 1891, when William Fairbridge, the Rhodesia representative of South Africa's Argus Printing and Publishing Company, established the Mashonaland Herald and Zambesian Times in Salisbury (now Harare). The Mashonaland Herald was succeeded by The Rhodesia Herald in 1892. The British South Africa Company Government Gazette was published between 1894 and 1923, initially as a supplement to The Herald. In 1893, the company established The Umtali Post in Umtali (now Mutare), followed in 1894 by The Bulawayo Chronicle in Bulawayo. In 1927, Argus spun off its Southern Rhodesia newspapers into a new company, the Rhodesian Printing and Publishing Company Limited. The company went public on the Rhodesia Stock Exchange on 8 March 1927. Argus gave up a majority of shares, but still held a controlling shareholding.

In the 1930s Sunday editions of The Herald and The Chronicle—The Sunday Mail and The Sunday News, respectively—were added through the inexpensive purchase of two existing weeklies bankrupted by the Great Depression. During these years, The Umtali Post was sold and later repurchased by Argus. During the Federation of Rhodesia and Nyasaland period, Argus began publishing The Northern News in Ndola, Northern Rhodesia, but stopped after Zambia gained independence in 1964. The company's efforts to establish two other daily papers in Salisbury, the Evening Standard and The National Observer, also ended unsuccessfully in the early 1960s. Initially largely staffed by South Africans and Britons from the 1930s, senior positions in the Rhodesian Printing and Publishing Company began to be filled by native-born white Rhodesians in the 1960s. Only in the 1970s did the company see its first Rhodesian-born editors, and later its first Rhodesian-born managing director. Only in the 1970s did the company also begin hiring blacks for entry-level technical and journalist positions.

=== Zimpapers, 1980–present ===
When Zimbabwe gained independence in 1980, the Rhodesian Printing and Publishing Company was renamed Zimbabwe Newspapers (1980) Limited. In 1981, the Zimbabwean government, concerned about the foreign ownership of the country's newspapers, purchased a controlling 43-percent shareholding in the company from the Argus Group, using a grant from Nigerian government. The trust continued buying smaller amounts of shares and eventually acquired a 51-percent majority shareholding in 1986. In January 1981, the government established the Zimbabwe Mass Media Trust (ZMMT) to manage the Nigerian grant and to oversee Zimpapers through an independent board, to shield it from commercial and political influence. That year, information minister Nathan Shamuyarira told a meeting of the Zimbabwe Union of Journalists, "We created the MMT so that the media would be in neutral hands and not business tycoons or the government—that would quash the free voice of journalists. The ZMMT appointed a new board of directors as well as new editors for the company's three biggest papers, The Herald, The Chronicle, and The Sunday Mail. After the acquisition, Argus offered guaranteed jobs in South Africa to former Zimpapers staff, leading to an exodus of whites from the company. The staff shortages that followed were addressed by the implementation of large-scale training and hiring programs. In addition, many vacant posts were filled by returning black Zimbabwean journalists and printers, particularly from Zambia, as well as by a small number of anti-apartheid South Africans, who arrived in the years after independence.

In 1984, Zimpapers took out a loan and purchased new color lithographic Printing presses, allowing the company's newspapers to publish in color. This was followed by the transition to phototypesetting in the late 1980s, and later to a digital production process in the 1990s. In 1986, the company launched its first indigenous-language newspaper, Kwayedza, published in Shona. An Ndebele-language paper, uMthunywa, followed in 2004. Zimpapers set up websites for its publications in the early 2000s. In 2004, the company partnered with Namibia-based New Era Newspapers to launch The Southern Times, a Southern African regional weekly circulating in Angola, Botswana, Namibia, South Africa, Zambia, and Zimbabwe. In 2009–10, Zimpapers diversified its publication portfolio with the introduction of tabloid newspapers H-Metro and B-Metro in Harare and Bulawayo, respectively. The company purchased a full-color third generation lithographic press in 2013. Business Weekly, a business newspaper launched in 2017, is the latest addition to the Zimpapers portfolio.

After the Zimbabwean government opened the radio and television markets to private actors, Zimpapers applied for one of the first commercial radio licenses. In 2012, it launched the Harare-based Star FM. It has since launched other radio stations in Harare, Mutare, and Kariba. In 2014, Zimpapers reentered the television market with the launch of Zimpapers Television Network (ZTN), having previously been one of the leading early shareholders in Rhodesia Television before it was nationalized during Rhodesia's UDI years.

==== Post-independence government control ====
When the Zimbabwean government created the Zimbabwe Mass Media Trust (ZMMT) to oversee the Zimpapers newspapers, there were initially safeguards to guard against interference by the state and the ruling ZANU–PF party. For instance, the trust's constitution stipulated that civil servants, members of Parliament, and uniformed services personnel could not serve as trustees. However, the trustees were appointed by the government, and in the 1980s, information minister Nathan Shamuyarira chose appointees who lacked a personal power base and were dependent on him for their political fortunes. In addition, Shamuyarira's picks excluded trade unionists, human rights activists, ZAPU supporters, and others who might challenge the government's agenda. Davison Sadza, a ZANU–PF member, was appointed ZMMT chairman, and Zimpapers came under the oversight of the Ministry of Information. By the mid-1980s, the ZMMT was heavily dependent on government funding and administrative support for its operation. The ZMMT, which was meant to be independent and nonpartisan, made a substantial financial contribution to ZANU–PF's campaign for the 1990 general election.

Beginning in the early 1980s, the Zimbabwean government began appointing loyalists to top posts within Zimpapers, who the company's former chief executive, a ZANU–PF supporter, referred to as "ZANU's hatchet men". The party and government directly interfered with the selection of newspaper editors starting in February 1981. Between 1985 and 1989, three Zimpapers editors were dismissed on ZANU–PF orders for political offenses, without objection by the ZMMT. Journalists were routinely subjected to warnings, reprimand, and other forms of intimidation. When Willie Musarurwa was removed as editor of The Sunday Mail in 1983, Minister Shamuyarira said that Prime Minister Robert Mugabe wanted to replace him with a "true and trusted cadre". In 1989, Geoffrey Nyarota, the editor of The Chronicle in Bulawayo, was moved to an insignificant administrative post in Harare after he exposed government corruption in the Willowgate scandal. Zimpapers managing director Elias Rusike, who was appointed by Shamuyarira in 1984, resigned in 1989 in protest of increasing political interference in the company's operations. By the 1990s, The Herald and The Sunday Mail consistently supported President Mugabe, though they would occasionally criticize his cabinet ministers.

On 14 December 2000, the board of the Zimbabwe Mass Media Trust was disbanded, allowing the Zimbabwean government to exercise a more direct role in Zimpapers operations. The decision to dissolve the board occurred after a reported meeting between its chairman, Honour Mkushi, and information minister Jonathan Moyo. The trust still technically owned Zimpapers, but without a board of trustees, it was effectively nonexistent. In November 2019, the government announced plans to revive the ZMMT. President Emmerson Mnangagwa appointed a six-member board, with Mkushi as chair, with effect from 10 February 2020.

== Publications ==
Publication	Location	Founded	Language	Type
B-Metro	Bulawayo	2010	English	Daily
Bridal Magazine	Harare	2011	English	Biannual
Business Weekly	Harare	2017	English	Weekly
The Chronicle	Bulawayo	1894	English	Daily
H-Metro	Harare	2009	English	Daily
The Herald	Harare	1891	English	Daily
Kwayedza	Harare	1986	Shona	Weekly
The Manica Post	Mutare	1893	English	Weekly
The Southern Times	Windhoek	2004	English	Weekly
Suburban	Harare	2016	English	Weekly
The Sunday Mail	Harare	1935	English	Weekly
The Sunday News	Bulawayo	1930	English	Weekly
uMthunywa	Bulawayo	2004	Ndebele	Weekly
Zimtravel	Harare	2003	English	Monthly

== Radio and television ==
In 2011, Zimpapers expanded its portfolio beyond newspaper publications with the launch of the Harare-based Star FM, Zimbabwe's first commercial radio station. It later launched several other regional radio stations, including Diamond FM in Mutare, Nyaminyami FM in Kariba, and Capitalk 100.4 FM in Harare. In 2014, the company entered television with the launch of Zimpapers Television Network (ZTN), which started broadcasting on 7 October 2017, and it was officially started broadcasting as a free-to air TV channel known as ZTN Prime on DStv Channel 294 on 24 May 2022 at 5:30pm.

== See also ==
- Media of Zimbabwe
