= Telecommunications in Zimbabwe =

Communications in Zimbabwe refers to the communication services available in Zimbabwe.

== Background ==
Postal and Telecommunications Regulatory Authority of Zimbabwe (POTRAZ) was established by the Postal and Telecommunications Act in 2000 and started its operations in March 2001. This legislation brought about a new institutional framework for telecommunications in Zimbabwe.

== Telephone system ==
The phone system was more commonly used and maintained than other parts of Africa, but now suffers from poor maintenance; more than 100,000 outstanding requests for connection despite an equally large number of installed but unused main lines.

Main lines in use: 356,000 (2011)

The domestic system consists of microwave radio relay links, open-wire lines, radiotelephone communication stations, fixed wireless local loop installations, and a substantial mobile cellular network; Internet connection is available in most major towns that includes Harare, Gweru Bulawayo, Mutare through fiber optic and other remote parts through satellite communication

International: country code – 263; satellite earth stations – 2 Intelsat; two international digital gateway exchanges (in Harare and Gweru) (2010)

Mobile cellular: 9.2 million (2011)

== Radio ==
Zimbabwe has 37 local radio stations. From the six that broadcast nationwide from the capital, four are state owned.

There are 10 provincial radio stations and 2 of those are state controlled. Out of the country’s 10 administrative provinces, Midlands province has 3 provincial radio stations followed by Bulawayo province with 2. Matabeleland South, Mashonaland East and Mashonaland Central provinces do not have dedicated provincial radio stations, although the Bulawayo based Skyz Metro FM stretched its signal to reach greater parts of Matabeleland South province.

There are 14 community radio stations across the country and are mostly in rural and remote areas. The number of community radio stations is expected to grow as per government announcement.

There are 7 campus radio stations for the country’s national tertiary institutions.

Two independent stations, ZiFM Stereo and Star FM were launched in 2012 and both broadcast nationally. 2016 saw the launch of 8 regional, private owned radio stations and in 2018, ZBC launched 2 more provincial stations, Khulumani FM in Bulawayo and 95.8 Central Radio in Gweru. The government went on to authorize licensing of community radio stations and campus radio stations in 2021.

As of 2013, Zimbabwean authorities have required all radio owners to obtain a "listening licence" from the state.

== Television ==
There is 1 state-controlled television station, ZBC TV, formerly Rhodesia Television (RTV). The government has shut down and refuses to issue licenses to domestic independent broadcasters such as JoyTV in 2002. However satellite TV providers including DStv are available. In 2013, Zimbabwe saw the introduction of its first pay TV. In 2017, Kwesé TV a subsidiary of Econet Global which was founded by Zimbabwean entrepreneur Strive Masiyiwa has been delayed license to operate in Zimbabwe by the Broadcasting Authority of Zimbabwe (BAZ). In November 2020, the Broadcasting Authority of Zimbabwe granted free to air, national commercial TV broadcasting licences to 6 private companies after shortlisting 14 applicants, breaking the national broadcaster's 60 year old TV monopoly. The regulator gave the 6 successful applicants 18 months to begin broadcasting.

TV stations that were awarded licences include the Bulawayo based FairTalk Communications' KeYona TV, ZimPapers Limited's ZTN (Zimpapers Television Network) (now known as ZTN Prime), Rusununguko Media's NRTV, Jester Media's 3K TV (now known as 3Ktv), Acacia Media Group's Kumba TV and Channel Dzimbahwe's Channel D. Unsuccessful applicants include AB Communications' Flex TV, Alpha Media Holdings' HStv, Blackbury Enterprises (Pvt) Ltd's Blackbury TV, Conduit Investments (Pvt) Ltd's Conduit TV Station, Just in Time TV (Pvt) Ltd's JIT TV, Medianet Productions (Pvt) Ltd's Sunrise TV and Meditation Investments (Pvt)'s Zim News Channel.

== Market structure mobile ==
There are three GSM mobile network operators, namely Econet, Net One and Telecel. The current subscriber base in June 2011 to these three mobile operators were 5,521,000 people for Econet, 1,297,000 for Net One, and 1,349,000 for Telecel. All of these operators are 100 percent digitalized and offer 2G, GPRS, EDGE, 3G and 4G LTE services.

== Internet ==
- There were 5.74 million internet users in Zimbabwe at the start of 2023, when internet penetration stood at 34.8 percent.
- Zimbabwe was home to 1.50 million social media users in January 2023, equating to 9.1 percent of the total population.
- A total of 14.08 million cellular mobile connections were active in Zimbabwe in early 2023, with this figure equivalent to 85.4 percent of the total population. source

Internet hosts: 30,615 (2012)

In 2009, there were 1.423 million internet users. In June 2004, Mugabe asked ISPs to monitor all email traffic passing through their systems for "anti-national activities". ISPs protest that this is an impossible task.

Country code (Top level domain): .zw

== See also ==
- Media of Zimbabwe

== Bibliography ==
- Anu Vedantham (1990). "Telecommunications in Zimbabwe". African Technology Forum. ISSN 1050-0014. Archived from the original on 17 July 2010.
