= KVG (presenter) =

- Born: Kudzai Violet Gwara; July 10, 1990 (age 35); Harare, Zimbabwe
- Occupations: on-air personality; TV presenter; host
- Years active: 2011–present
- Known for: Media personality at Star FM Zimbabwe and ZBC TV
- Spouse: unknown

Kudzai Violet Gwara popularly known as KVG is a Zimbabwean radio personality, television and events host as well as brand influencer. She presents 326 Express show on Star FM Zimbabwe.

== Background ==
KVG was born in on 10 July 1990 in Harare, Zimbabwe where she grew up. She joined one of the biggest urban radio stations in Zimbabwe at the age of 21, becoming the youngest radio presenter in Zimbabwe that time where she started presenting 326 Express show with former co-host Phatisani Sibanda and the show is rated as one of the most listened to drive time shows in Zimbabwean radio. In 2016 KVG hosted the 326 Express from United Kingdom which became the first live broadcast from UK in the history of Zimbabwean radio. KVG is the producer of 326 Express show. She is also a presenter for Coca-Cola On The Beat show on ZBC TV.

In 2013 KVG hosted D'Banj show in Zimbabwe then in 2016, she hosted Jah Cure concert at Harare International Conference Center, she also hosted the Star FM Music Awards in 2021.

== Awards and recognition ==
- 100 Most Influential Zimbabweans 2014
- 50 most influential young Zimbabweans 2014
- Zimbabwe National Women's Awards - Woman of the year (Media and radio broadcasting leadership)
- Zimbabwe International Women Awards 2015 - People's Choice of the year
- Zimbabwe Radio Awards - Most Popular Urban Female Presenter
- 100 Most Influential Zimbabweans Under 40 (2012-2017 list)
- Megafest National Business Awards 2018 - Media Personality of the Year
- Institute of Corporate Directors 2020 - Zimbabwe Most Influential Young Leaders Under 40
- IPRCZ - Public Relations and Communications Excellence Awards 2020 - Best Campaign (Lifestyle and entertainment)
- Zimbabwe Achievers Awards 2021- Influencer of the year
- Top Media Personalities in Zimbabwe 2021
- Megafest Women's Awards 2022 - Outstanding Media Personality of the year
