= Zimbabwe Tribune =

Zimbabwe Tribune is an internet based newspaper published in Zimbabwe and the UK. It has a specialised focus on current events in Zimbabwe's political developments. The newspaper was launched in January 2009.

The Zimbabwe Tribune provides Internet-only aggregated political news and opinion articles focused on Zimbabwe politics. It is published by 3MG Media which also operates the Zimbabwe Daily News (ZimDaily), Zimbabwe Telegraph, Harare Tribune, and Zim Net Radio.

== Circulation ==
Zimbabwe Tribune is currently only an online edition. Its website is updated daily and accessible for free.
