= Zvaringeni Samuel Chasi =

Zimbabwean politician

Mr Zvaringeni Samuel Chasi
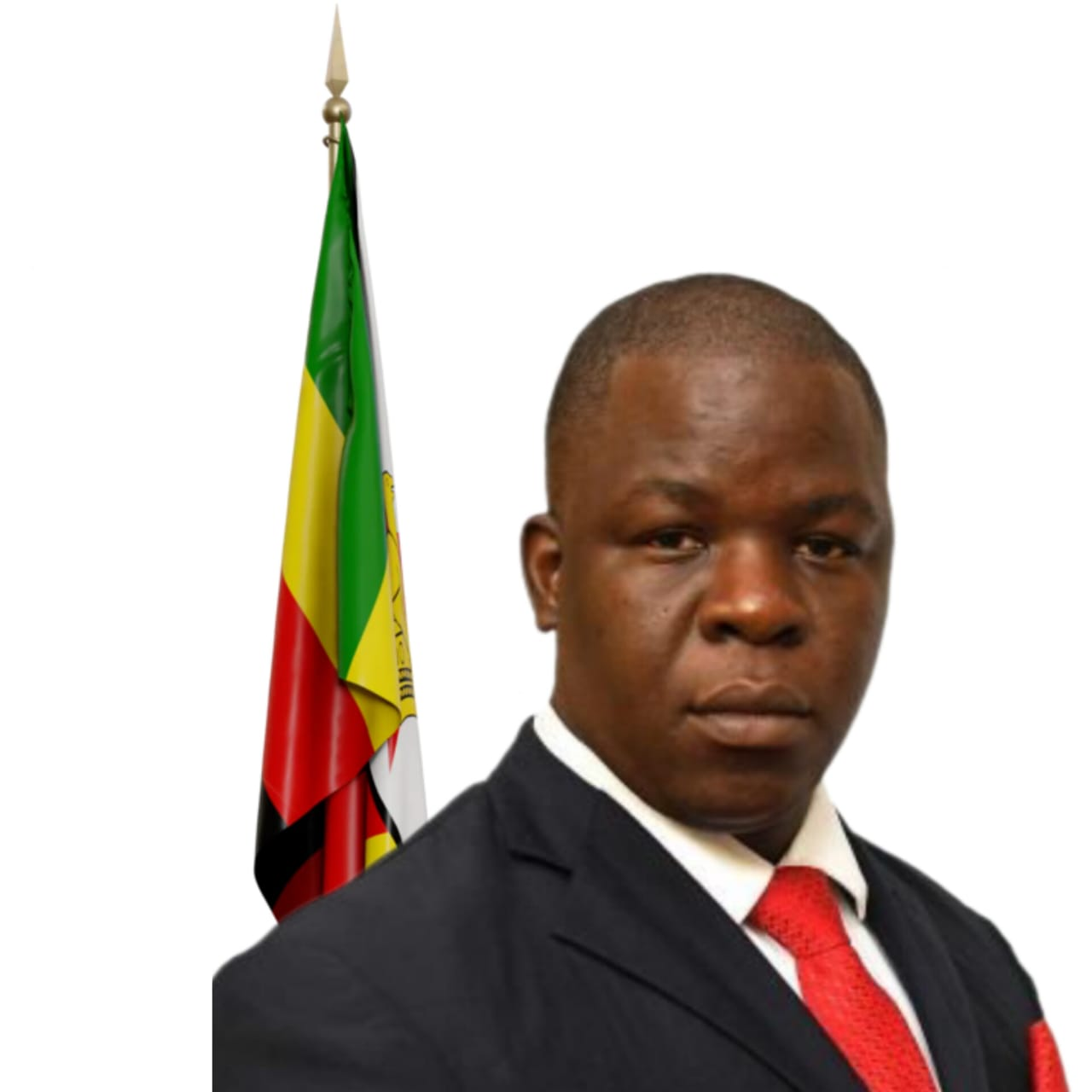
- Born: 9 January 1988 (age 38); Mzilikazi Clinic, Bulawayo, Matebeleland
- Occupation: Politician • Human rights advocate • Entrepreneur
- Known for: Petitioned the International Criminal Court (ICC) for the arrest and prosecution of President Emmerson Mnangagwa

President & CIC of People's Patriotic Party
- Incumbent
- Assumed office 2022
- Vice President: William Dube
- Preceded by: Party founded

Personal details
- Party: People's Patriotic Party

Zvaringeni Samuel Chasi (born 9 January 1988) is a Zimbabwean politician and the incumbent opposition president and commander-in-chief of People's Patriotic Party. Previous notable service is with the Ministry of Youth, Ministry of Defense, and Ministry of Foreign Affairs in Zimbabwe.

== Human rights activism ==
In September 2022 Chasi wrote an open letter to the International Criminal Court (ICC) asking the Hague-based court to arrest President Emmerson Dambudzo Mnangagwa over allegations of a litany of human rights abuses, including rape, torture, and abductions.

Chasi wrote the letter ahead of Mnangagwa's visit to New York City, United States of America, to attend the 77th session of the United Nations General Assembly in New York on 13 September 2022.

The letter, which was addressed to Mnangagwa, was copied to the UN, African Union, SADC, Diplomatic Missions, ICC, Parliament of Zimbabwe, and Political Parties. Part of the letter read:

In the letter he told of the International Criminal Court and the torture, abduction and rape in 1983.

Chasi was invited by SABC News for an interview concerning issues in Zimbabwe Opposition calls for Mnangagwa's arrest over the He had an interview with the Zimbabwe radio.

== Political career ==
In September 2022 Chasi wrote to the International Criminal Court calling for the arrest of President Emmerson Mnangagwa over alleged human rights abuses. He was granted permission to hold peaceful protests at the 77th United Nations General Assembly to highlight these electoral concerns and advocate for human rights and democratic reforms in Zimbabwe. On 13 September 2022 he called for a national shutdown and the impeachment of President Emmerson Dambudzo Mnangagwa in absentia during the United Nations General Assembly urging that peace law and order be maintained during the coordinated action.

Chasi led the party boycott of the 2023 Harmonised Elections scheduled for 23 August 2023. In a letter to United Nations Secretary General António Guterres on 27 June 2023 Chasi cited the absence of conditions for free and fair elections as the reason for the boycott.

On 22 August 2023 Chasi announced the special endorsement of Advocate Nelson Chamisa leader of the Citizens Coalition for Change for the 2023 Harmonised Elections declaring that the People's Patriotic Party was rallying behind Chamisa’s bid to become Zimbabwe’s next president without forming a formal coalition. Pursuant to the People's Patriotic Party Constitution and Standing Orders Chasi affirmed that this support aligned with the party ideology to initiate a revolutionary process which cannot be altered or postponed describing the Citizens Coalition for Change as a fraternal liberation movement akin to ZANLA and ZIPRA to defeat the oppressive system of ZANU–PF. Chasi stated that the People's Patriotic Party had unanimously undertaken to render maximum support to the Citizens Coalition for Change from its membership including bona fide veterans of the struggle emphasizing the need to stand as one voice against ZANU–PF. Chasi urged party members and citizens to defend the vote stating that every vote in the ballot counts and is their secret not to disclose under intimidation from any militia a clarion call to play our role and consecrate our skills to this crucial struggle.

In a State of the Nation address on 12 February 2024, Chasi made a demand for fresh elections by June 2024 to United Nations Secretary-General António Guterres, with copies sent to the African Union and the Southern African Development Community (SADC). Chasi expressed concerns regarding the conduct of the 23 August 2023 harmonized elections which he argued did not adhere to the Electoral Act or the Constitution of Zimbabwe.

== Military career ==
Chasi served as a Civil-Military Relations (CMR) Practitioner within the Ministry of Defence, focusing on fostering cooperation between military and civilian sectors. Civil-military relations involve interactions between military organizations, civil society, government entities, and political leadership to align military functions with national security objectives while upholding civilian control of the military. In contexts with reported human rights challenges, CMR facilitates dialogue to address military influence on governance and promote accountability, particularly relevant to civil society.

He faced professional challenges, including summons and pressure from the Office of the President and Cabinet (OPC) and officials at King George VI Barracks in Harare, which preceded his resignation on 30 November 2018. He attributed his departure to his opposition to the 2017 Zimbabwean coup d'état and the military shootings in 2018, according to his statements. Following his resignation, he received terminal benefits.

Chasi later referenced the unresolved Motlanthe Commission of Inquiry into the 2018 post-election violence, noting a lack of accountability, a view echoed in opposition critiques of the commission's non-implementation. After leaving the military, Chasi became a human rights advocate, collaborating with civil society to address governance issues linked to the ZANU–PF administration.

== Reforms ==
In April 2025, Chasi urged the Commonwealth to defer Zimbabwe’s re-admission until the government implements significant democratic and human rights reforms. He argued that the ZANU-PF-led government has undermined democratic governance, citing the 2017 military coup that installed President Emmerson Mnangagwa and statements by military officials prioritizing leaders with liberation war credentials over civilian authority. He asserted that Zimbabwe has consistently failed to meet international standards for free and fair elections, referencing reports from observer missions, including the Commonwealth, African Union, European Union, and SADC, which documented electoral irregularities such as violence, missing ballots, and lack of transparency. To address these issues, Chasi called for transparent electoral processes, including voter registration, voter rolls, delimitation, nomination courts, and ballot printing, and proposed restructuring the Zimbabwe Electoral Commission to eliminate military influence and nepotism. He also advocated repealing restrictive legislation, including the Maintenance of Peace and Order Act (2019), the Patriotic Act (2023), and the Cyber and Data Protection Act, to safeguard freedom of expression and dissent. Further reforms included reducing presidential terms from five to four years with a two-term limit, abolishing the Senate reintroduced in 2005 to enhance accountability, and disbanding the National Youth Service and Herbert Chitepo School of Ideology, which he argued promote a one-party state ideology in violation of Article 26 of the Universal Declaration of Human Rights, which upholds education free from political indoctrination. He also emphasized independent reforms in media, education, and security services to promote inclusive, non-partisan governance. He stressed that the Commonwealth must uphold its principles of democracy and human rights by requiring these reforms before considering Zimbabwe’s re-admission.
