= JoyRukanza =

- Born: Bulawayo, Zimbabwe
- Genres: RnB; Pop
- Occupations: songwriter; musician
- Instrument: Vocals
- Years active: 2021–present

JoyRukanza, formerly known as JØY, is a Zimbabwean musical artist and TEDx speaker.

== Early life and education ==
Joy Roselyn Rukanzakanza was born on June 23, 1995, in Bulawayo, Zimbabwe, she grew up in Pumula South in Bulawayo. She had her early education at Robert Tredgold Primary School, then she had her secondary education at Sizane High School where she began public speaking, representing her school in local and regional Public Speaking and Debate competitions and she served as a junior Deputy Chief Adjudicator for the Zimbabwe National Debate Championships. In 2017, she was the first student to give a TEDx talk at Bryn Mawr College.

== Music career ==
JoyRukanza began her professional music career in 2014 when she featured on Zimbabwean producer Skaiva on his EP titled Against All Odds released that year. She collaborated on a track titled Shingirira which became popular in Zimbabwe and South Africa with high rotation airplay on several radio stations mostly on ZiFM Stereo and Skyz Metro FM and the song was featured by South African producer Chymamusique in his award-winning album Musique eight years later.

She then collaborated with South African dance music producer, Enosoul, resulting in the creation of a dance track Tamba which featured in Enosoul's 2018 project In2deep Vol 4. In 2022, JoyRukanza was featured in Tanto Wavie's Amasungura EP on the track titled Muyeuchidze In the same year, she worked with Kbrizzy x Phanas on a song Rubies and Diamonds as part of their joint project, When We're Not Being Lazy.

In early 2021, JoyRukanza's released her debut solo record, New Day featuring South African hip-hop artist KiD X then she released her follow-up single, Roses which premiered on BBC Music before its official release in March 2021. In October 2021, she released Queendom. The song got high rotation airplay and featured on hit singles charts and also featured in global Apple Music, Boomplay, and Spotify playlists.

In December 2021, JoyRukanza launched a music festival called The Forêt Tropicale at the Zimbabwe International Trade Fair in Bulawayo.

In October 2022, JoyRukanza became one of the first Zimbabwean musicians to be invited to a BBC Music cypher courtesy of BBC Music Introducing x BBC Radio 1xtra.

In 2023, she released her debut eleven track album MatterMoreForSis.

== Discography ==
=== Albums ===
- MatterMoreForSis

=== Videography ===
Song	Album	Year
New Day	MatterMoreForSis	2021
Roses	MatterMoreForSis	2021
Queendom	MatterMoreForSis	2021
The J -Space Performance	Single release	2021
Survive The Night	MatterMoreForSis	2023

== Awards ==
- Bulawayo Arts Awards 2022 - Outstanding Female Artist of the Year (Nominated)
- Bulawayo Arts Awards 2022 - Newcomer of the Year (Nominated)
- Zimbabwe Achievers Awards 2023 - Outstanding Achievement in Music
