= The Trillion Dollar Campaign =

A billboard bearing one of the four campaign slogans of The Trillion Dollar Campaign, printed on real Zimbabwean dollar banknotes.

The Trillion Dollar Campaign is an outdoor advertising campaign launched in 2009 to promote the newspaper The Zimbabwean in South Africa. The campaign was created by advertising agency TBWA Hunt Lascaris in conjunction with the Zimbabwean's marketing manager, Liz Linsell, with the goal of both increasing awareness of the newspaper itself, and of the growing problems of hyperinflation in Zimbabwe and increasing restrictions on free speech by the government. The Trillion Dollar Campaign made extensive use of Zimbabwean banknotes, repurposing them as printing paper for handouts, billboards, and poster advertisements. The campaign was highly successful, and gathered significant publicity; first in other South African newspapers, then in other media such as television and radio, and finally in international publications such as The Guardian and The Times. The Trillion Dollar Campaign went on to win several honours from the marketing community, receiving Golds at The Art Directors Club Awards and the ANDY Awards, and taking home the Grand Prix in the Outdoor category of the 2009 Cannes Lions International Advertising Festival, the most prestigious awards ceremony in the advertising industry.

== Production ==
=== Background ===
In 1999, Wilf Mbanga founded an independent Zimbabwean newspaper titled The Daily News, with the goal of providing neutral coverage of events occurring in the country. The paper operated for three years before Mbanga was arrested for anti-government activities. While he was eventually acquitted of the charges, The Daily News was banned by the government of Zimbabwe, and Mbanga was declared an "Enemy of the People". Following several death threats, Mbanga fled to Europe, staying first in the Netherlands before moving on to the United Kingdom.

With monetary assistance from the European Union, Mbanga founded The Zimbabwean, a daily newspaper featuring stories provided by in-country correspondents, edited in London, and printed in South Africa, close to the Zimbabwean border. Within five years, The Zimbabwean had a daily print run of 150,000, the majority of which was exported to Zimbabwe itself. However, in June 2008, the country's government re-classified the newspaper as a luxury, imposing a 55% duty on its import from South Africa. This made it impossible for the paper to break even while selling the paper at a price that the average citizen could afford. By 2009, circulation of the newspaper fell from 150,000 to 30,000, and the paper had to cancel its Sunday installment.

=== Campaign ===
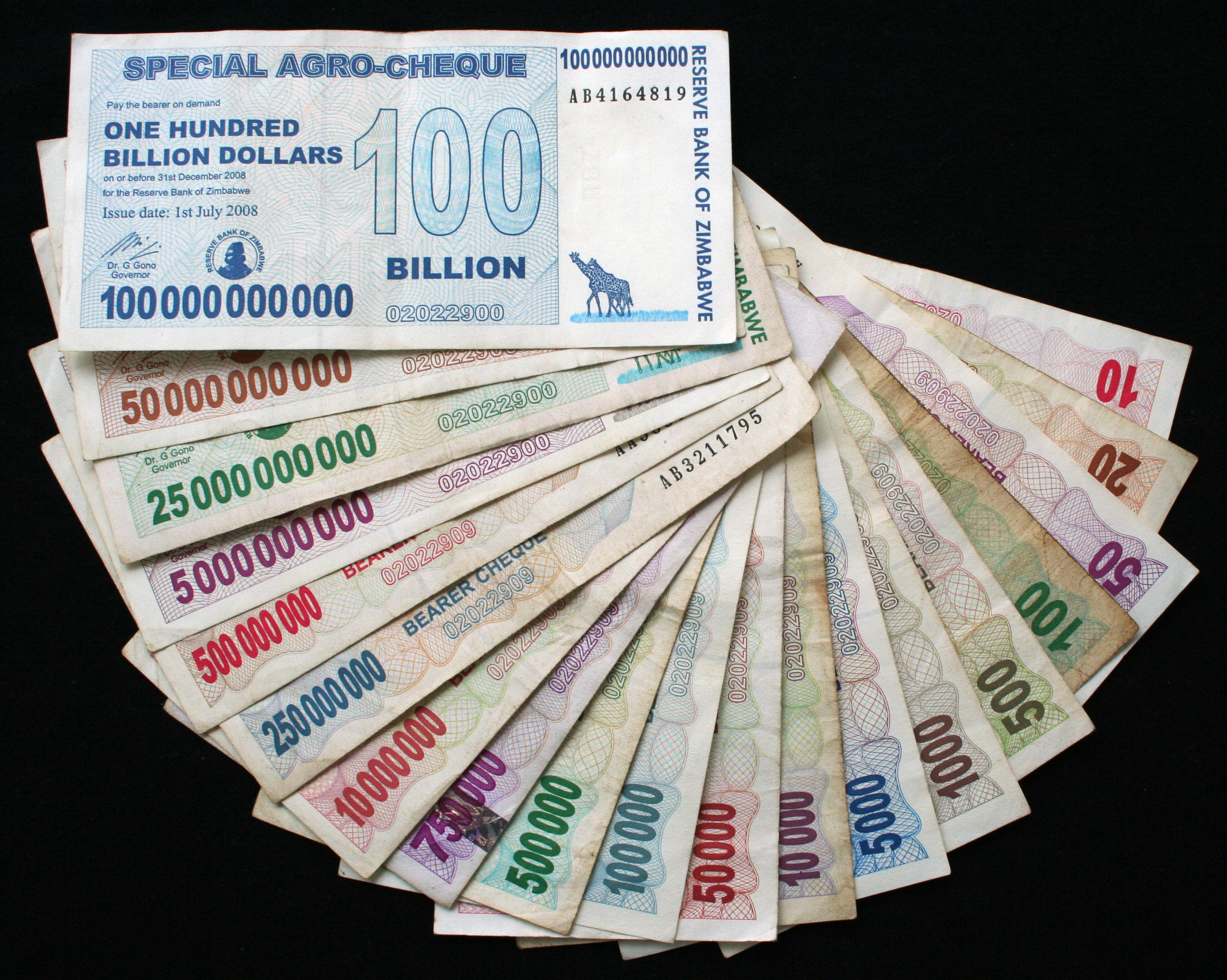
Due to hyperinflation, banknotes of increasingly preposterous denominations were printed throughout 2008 and 2009.

The Zimbabwean approached Johannesburg-based advertising agency TBWA/Hunt/Lascaris for ideas on how to make the export of the paper to Zimbabwe economically viable. The concept for the campaign was born from a meeting between the two companies, when representatives from the newspaper showed examples of the currency used to purchase The Zimbabwean in Zimbabwe itself. After years of hyperinflation, the Zimbabwean Dollar had reached the point where the face value of many banknotes (which had reached denominations as high as Z$100,000,000,000,000) was less than the value of the paper itself.

With a limited budget (only £4000 was available for the purchase of advertising space), TBWA came back with a pitch to highlight the growing crisis, through a low-cost outdoor advertising campaign, by printing advertising on real banknotes, using the collapse of the currency as an analogy for the collapse of Zimbabwe itself. The resulting media coverage would be leveraged to increase sales of the paper outside of Zimbabwe, primarily to the large communities of Zimbabwean expatriates living in the United Kingdom and southern Africa. The extra funds would be used to subsidise sales of the paper to the actual target audience for the paper in-country.

== Release and reception ==
The Trillion Dollar Campaign was launched in March 2009. Banknotes of denominations between Z$1,000,000 and Z$100,000,000,000, each bearing one of four English-language advertising slogans, the website address for The Zimbabwean, its logo, and its tagline "A voice for the voiceless", were handed out to motorists stopped at busy intersections in Johannesburg. Rolls of the altered currency were mailed to industry figures, media personalities, and politicians. Posters were put up at every location selling copies of the newspaper in the city, murals 1.5 m (4.9 ft) tall by 5 m (16 ft) wide were pasted across walls along streets with heavy foot traffic, and billboard spaces were purchased overlooking several highways. All were composed of hundreds or thousands of banknotes, which could be detached and taken home by members of the public. The four slogans used in the campaign were "Fight The Regime That Has Crippled A Country", "It's Cheaper To Print This On Money Than Paper", "Z$250 000 000 Cannot Buy The Paper To Print This Poster On", and "Thanks to Mugabe This Money Is Wallpaper".

The campaign's release immediately grabbed the attention of the media. By the time the first billboard had been put up, mentions appeared on South African national television and radio broadcasts. Features on The Trillion Dollar Campaign began to appear, first in national newspapers such as Sake24, then in international publications such as The Times. The extensive media coverage of the campaign translated into an impressive jump in both public awareness of the Zimbabwean and its message, and in sales figures. In the first week following the launch, hits to The Zimbabwean's website spiked from its norm of 100,000 to over 2,000,000. By June 2009, sales of the paper had increased by 276%, and images from the campaign uploaded to the paper's account on image hosting website Flickr had been viewed over 200,000 times.

The Trillion Dollar Campaign received a number of honours from the advertising industry, including winning Golds at the Art Directors Club Awards, the ANDY Awards, and the Loerie Awards. In the run-up to the Cannes Lions International Advertising Festival, the most prestigious awards ceremony in the advertising industry, the campaign was pipped to win in several categories. The most difficult to call was for the Outdoor/Ambient category, where The Trillion Dollar Campaign faced off against a number of non-traditional campaigns, including an ambient campaign titled In The Streets, created by advertising agency Bartle Bogle Hegarty to promote Oasis' seventh studio album, Dig Out Your Soul. Over the seven-day series of awards presentations, the team behind The Trillion Dollar Campaign received awards in six categories: five Golds and a Silver, and took home the Grand Prix in the Outdoor category, the highest number of awards ever received by a South African campaign at Cannes. Following the conclusion of the campaign, the Zimbabwean government announced the reversal of its decision to re-classify The Zimbabwean as a luxury item, and the import duty imposed on the paper was dropped.

Preceded by Voyeur	Cannes Lions Outdoor Grand Prix Winner; 2009	Succeeded by Get Stupid; Teletransporter
