= ZTN =

ZTN may refer to:

- IATA station code for Trenton Transit Center, Trenton, New Jersey, United States
- Postal code for Żejtun, Malta
- Zero trust networking
- Zimpapers Television Network, a subsidiary of Zimpapers, a Zimbabwean newspaper company
