= Soulmate (Zimbabwean TV series) =

New Zimbabwean TV drama series

- Genre: Drama miniseries
- Created by: Braydan Heart; Tavaka Matunah
- Written by: Tavaka Matunah
- Directed by: Braydan Heart
- Starring: Braydan Heart; Randall Ncube; Brucella; Nkosilathi Kezzman Mabuza IV; Perfect Nkiwane; Shingayi S Muganda; Caroline Reekers; Mitchel Heather; BenChest; Ntombie Buhlungu; Qeqeshiwe Mntambo; Prudence Changara; Rodney Mabaleka; Tavaka Matunha; Tafadzwa Thabiso Maodzwa; Fredrick Ncube; Andile Nyambo; Thabisile Ngwenya; Calvin Madula; Bhekiwe Dube; Ivy Thabiso Masola; Dumie Manyathela; Linda Ndlovu
- Theme music composer: Asaph
- Opening theme: Lust
- Composer: Irvin Rooney
- Country of origin: Zimbabwe
- Original languages: English isiNdebele; Shona
- No. of seasons: 1
- No. of episodes: 8

Production
- Executive producers: Braydan Heart; Irvin Rooney; Tavaka Matunah
- Producer: Braydan Heart
- Production locations: Bulawayo, Zimbabwe
- Cinematography: Dumie Manyathela; Rodney Mabaleka
- Editor: Braydan Heart
- Running time: 23-28 minutes
- Production company: Heart FX Studios

Original release
- Network: DStv; ZTN Prime
- Release: 29 May 2022 – present

Soulmate is a Zimbabwean young adult drama series that premiered on ZTN Prime on May 29, 2022. It is produced by Heart FX Studios, a production house owned by award-winning Zimbabwean film maker Braydan Heart. Soulmate runs at 13 episodes per season and airs every Sunday at 21h00 CAT on ZTN Prime a new Zimbabwean TV channel that is on the South African satellite broadcaster DStv.

== Plot ==
- Soulmate explores concepts and themes associated with young adults but mainly focuses on the lives of Phumza a player from the ghetto side of town, who ends up in love with Lucratia, a rich good girl. As the show progresses, their lives intertwine in a clash of lifestyles, resentments, envy, and sexual attraction. The show takes place during the last days of the 1st Zimbabwean COVID-19 lockdown.
- Structurally, the series employs a flash forward plot that involves a mystery element, with most episodes taking place in three time lines.

== Main characters ==
Actors	Characters	Season 1
Braydan Heart	Phumza	Main
Randal Ncube	Locratia	Main
Nkosilathi Mabuza	Chris	Main
Brucella	Violeta	Main
Perfect Nkiwane	Owen	Main
Shingayi Muganda	Simba	Recurring
Ben Chest	Dumisani	Recurring
Qeqeshiwe Mntambo	Thandi	Recurring
Prudence Changara	Ruvarashe	Recurring
Fredrick Ncube	Stilo	Recurring
Tafadzwa Maodzwa	Zakes	Recurring
Calvin Madula	Lyon	Recurring
Ntombie Buhlungu	Anita	Recurring
Mitchel Heather	Shevonne	Recurring
Thabisile Ngwenya	Pinky	Recurring
Tavaka Matunah	Mandla	Recurring
Caroline Reekers	Smiso	Recurring
Andile Nyambo	Mjosto	Recurring
Bhekiwe Dube	Barbie	Recurring
