= Postal Orders of Zimbabwe =

Money transfer service provided by the Zimbabwe postal system

Postal orders of Zimbabwe are money orders used to send money via post offices to, from, or within Zimbabwe. Postal orders have been issued for Zimbabwe since 18 April 1980, when the British colony of Rhodesia became independent as the Republic of Zimbabwe.

Remaining Postal Orders of Rhodesia are confirmed to still have been issued in 1982, but it is not yet known when these were exhausted.

Postal orders are regulated by the Postal and Telecommunications Authority of Zimbabwe.

== See also ==
- Telecommunications in Zimbabwe
