= Pedzisai Ruhanya =

Zimbabwean academic and media scholar (born 1985)

- Born: July 10, 1973 (age 52); Harare, Zimbabwe
- Education: University of Zimbabwe (BA), University of Essex (MA), University of Westminster (PhD), University of Minnesota (Humphrey Fellow)
- Occupations: Academic, journalist, human rights advocate
- Employer(s): University of Zimbabwe, Zimbabwe Democracy Institute
- Known for: Media freedom advocacy, political analysis
- Notable work: The History and Political Transition of Zimbabwe

Pedzisai Ruhanya (born July 10, 1973) is a former News Editor for Zimbabwean independent newspaper Daily News. He is a former president of the Harare Polytechnic Students Representative Council serving with people including Secretary General Lance Guma, Vice President Alec Magama, Information and Publicity Secretary Sibanengi Dube. Ruhanya is the Programmes Manager for the Crisis in Zimbabwe Coalition.

== Education ==
Pedzisai Ruhanya holds multiple academic qualifications from institutions in Zimbabwe, the United Kingdom, and the United States. He earned a Bachelor of Laws (LLB) and a Bachelor of Science in Sociology from the University of Zimbabwe. He later obtained a Master of Arts in Human Rights from the University of Essex in the United Kingdom. Ruhanya also completed a Ph.D. in Media and Democracy at the University of Westminster.

In addition to his academic degrees, Ruhanya was awarded a Hubert H. Humphrey Fellowship in 2010, during which he studied international human rights law and the law of armed conflict at the University of Minnesota.
