= Zimbabwe Telegraph =

- Type: Online newspaper
- Founded: 2008
- Country: Zimbabwe; UK; Canada
- Website: zimtelegraph.com

Zimbabwe Telegraph was an internet newspaper published in Zimbabwe, UK and Canada. It focused on current events in Zimbabwe's politics, social and economic developments. The newspaper was first published in late 2008; as of April 2025, it is currently offline.

The Zimbabwe Telegraph's website aggregated news and opinion articles. The site covered a wide range of topics, including sections devoted to politics, entertainment, media, health, law and business. Its team of regular bloggers included many people amongst Zimbabwe's politicians, commentators, and analysts to an extensive network of opinion writers.

== History ==
Zimbabwe Telegraph began publication on 16 December 2008 by 3MG Media as a news and current events publication focused on Zimbabwe social, political and economic developments. 3MG Media also published the Zimbabwe Daily News (ZimDaily), Zimbabwe Tribune and Harare Tribune.

== Contributors ==
In addition to regular (often daily) news by its reporters and a regular team of contributors the Zimbabwe Telegraph has featured notable contributors from finance, politics, journalism, business, and entertainment. The Zimbabwe Telegraph offers both news commentary and coverage. It has a standing policy of encouraging comments from all parts of the political spectrum through its forum website co-hosted with its sister publication Zimbabwe Daily News. The forum is home to discussions on politics, religion, and world affairs.

== Circulation ==
Zimbabwe Telegraph's print edition's circulation was put on hold due to the economic conditions in Zimbabwe. However, its website was accessible for free between December 2008 and at least 2021, though the last piece of news uploaded to it, titled "Mujuru party exposes Mugabe", was from May 16, 2016.
