= Geoffrey Nyarota =

Zimbabwean journalist and activist (1951–2025)

- Born: January 1951; Southern Rhodesia (now Zimbabwe)
- Died: 22 March 2025 (aged 74); Harare, Zimbabwe
- Occupation: Journalist
- Organization: The Daily News
- Spouse: Ursula
- Children: Three (Tafirenyika; Itayi & Rufaro)
- Awards: Golden Pen of Freedom Award (2002); UNESCO/Guillermo Cano World Press Freedom Prize (2002)

Geoffrey Nyarota (January 1951 – 22 March 2025) was a Zimbabwean journalist and human rights activist. Born in colonial Southern Rhodesia, he trained as a teacher before beginning his career with a Zimbabwean state-owned newspaper, The Herald. As editor of the state-owned Bulawayo Chronicle in 1989, he helped to break the "Willowgate" scandal, which resulted in several resignations from the cabinet of President Robert Mugabe.

When Nyarota was subsequently removed from his post, he spent several years teaching in exile before returning to open the independent Daily News. Bearing the motto "Telling it like it is", the Daily News swiftly became Zimbabwe's most popular newspaper. However, the paper also suffered two bombings, allegedly by Zimbabwean security forces. Nyarota was arrested six times and reportedly was the target of a government assassination plot. After being forced from the paper by new management in December 2002, Nyarota left Zimbabwe.

In exile in the United States, he began The Zimbabwe Times, an online newspaper. His memoir Against the Grain, Memoirs of a Zimbabwean Newsman was published in South Africa in 2006.

== Early life ==
Nyarota was born in Southern Rhodesia (today Zimbabwe) to middle-class black parents in January 1951. He later received a university education. He initially trained as a teacher—stating later that "in colonial Rhodesia the only job open to educated Africans was teaching"—and was posted at Inyanga in the country's east.

When The Rhodesia Herald newspaper announced that it was recruiting a small number of black trainees in 1978, Nyarota applied and was hired.

== "Willowgate" scandal ==
In 1989, he was editor of the state-owned Bulawayo Chronicle. The paper built a reputation for aggressive investigations into corruption at all levels of government, and Nyarota became "something of a hero". In the "Willowgate" investigation, Nyarota and deputy editor Davison Maruziva reported that ministers and officials from the government of President Robert Mugabe had been given early access to buy foreign cars at an assembly plant in Willowvale, an industrial suburb of Harare. In some cases, the cars were bought wholesale and resold at a 200% profit. The newspaper published documents from the plant to prove its case, including identification numbers from the vehicles.

Mugabe appointed a three-person panel, the Sandura Commission, to investigate the allegations. The Washington Post reported that the commission's hearings "struck a deep chord" in Zimbabwe, where citizens had grown to resent the perceived growing corruption of government. Five of Mugabe's cabinet ministers eventually resigned due to implication in the scandal, including Defense Minister Enos Nkala and Maurice Nyagumbo, the third highest-ranking official in Mugabe's party, the Zimbabwe African National Union (ZANU).

However, Nyarota and Maruziva were both forced out of their jobs with the state-owned paper and into newly created public relations positions in Harare. Though the men were given pay raises, Mugabe also stated that the move was a result of their "overzealousness", leading to public belief that they had been removed for their reporting. ZANU parliamentarians also criticized Nyarota and Maruziva, with the Minister of State for National Security stating that criticism was welcome, but "to the extent that the press now deliberately target Government as their enemy, then we part ways."

Nyarota then spent several years in self-imposed exile, teaching journalism in South Africa.

== Daily News ==
In 1999, Nyarota founded the Daily News, an independent daily newspaper. The paper stated that it would be neither "pro-government" nor "anti-government", but would "be a medium for vibrant discourse among the divergent political, social, religious and other groups of Zimbabwe", as well as fight for press freedom and freedom of speech. Its first issue appeared on 21 March 1999. The newspaper's motto was "Telling it like it is".

Within a year, the newspaper had passed the circulation of the state-owned Herald, with a daily circulation of 105,000 copies; the Herald's circulation was reported to have fallen by 50% during the same period. President Mugabe accused the paper of being a "mouthpiece" for the Movement for Democratic Change, a political coalition opposed to his rule, while Nyarota asserted that the paper was independent and criticized both parties.

During his editorship of the Daily News, Nyarota was arrested six times. On 1 August 2000, the News reported that Zimbabwe's secret police, the Central Intelligence Organisation, had sent a man named Bernard Masara to kill Nyarota; however, after meeting Nyarota in a lift, Masara changed his mind and warned him of the plot. Masara then called his employer with the paper's editors listening so that they could verify the source of the plan.

On 22 April 2000, a bomb was thrown into the paper's offices, but no one was hurt. South African Associated Press photographer Obed Zilwa was arrested for the attack, but the newspaper alleged that agents of Mugabe's security forces had thrown the bomb. Zilwa was released without charge 48 hours later. In January 2001, the News building was bombed again, this time destroying its printing presses. According to the Committee to Protect Journalists, "credible sources" linked the Zimbabwean military to the attack.

On 30 December 2002, Nyarota resigned as editor of the Daily News, to avoid his firing by the paper's new executive chair. The paper was shut down by the government in September 2003.

== Later career ==
In 2003, Nyarota and his family fled to South Africa and later to the United States. There, Nyarota was awarded a fellowship at the Nieman Foundation for Journalism at Harvard University. He also taught journalism classes at Bard College.

In 2006, he released his first book, Against the Grain. The memoir tells of his experiences as a schoolteacher in Rhodesia and later as a journalist under Mugabe's rule. From exile, he also began the website www.thezimbabwetimes.com, describing Internet news as the "loophole" in Zimbabwean government censorship.

== Personal life and death ==
Nyarota had a wife, Ursula, and three children Tafirenyika, Itayi, and Rufaro. He died from colon cancer at Murambi Hospital in Mutare, on 22 March 2025, at the age of 74.

== Awards ==
In 2001, the Committee to Protect Journalists awarded Nyarota its International Press Freedom Award, which recognizes journalists who show courage in defending press freedom despite facing attacks, threats, or imprisonment. The World Association of Newspapers awarded him its Golden Pen of Freedom Award in 2002. That same year he was also awarded UNESCO's Guillermo Cano World Press Freedom Prize.
