= Gwanda State University =

University in Insiza District, Zimbabwe

- Type: Tertiary education institution
- Established: 2012
- Affiliations: Ministry of Higher and Tertiary Education, Zimbabwe
- Officer in charge: Professor Callistus Ndlovu (task team head)
- Vice-Chancellor: Professor Doreen Z. Moyo
- Patron: Angeline Masuku
- Location: Gwanda, Matabeleland South, Zimbabwe; 20.951631°S 29.01476°E
- Campus: Gwanda, Filabusi

Location of Gwanda State University in Matabeleland South

Gwanda State University is a state higher education institution that is in Insiza district, Zimbabwe. The university is temporarily at the former Epoch Mine in Insiza district whilst construction takes place. The university is in Isiza district which was once part of Gwanda district from where the university get its name. The main campus shall occupy an area of 87 hectares (210 acres) site in Gwanda, with a 2.5 hectares (6.2 acres) farm at Filabusi.

== Academics ==
The university has two faculties — Engineering and Agriculture — with a Faculty of Industrial Management to follow later.

Programs offered under the faculty of engineering (five years):

- Beng (Hons) Metallurgical Engineering
- Beng (Hons) Mining Engineering
- Bachelor of Engineering (Hons) in Surveying and Geomatics Engineering

Programs offered in the faculty of agriculture (four years):

- Bsc (Hons) Agriculture-Crop science
- Bsc (Hons) Agriculture–Animal science
