= People's Patriotic Party =

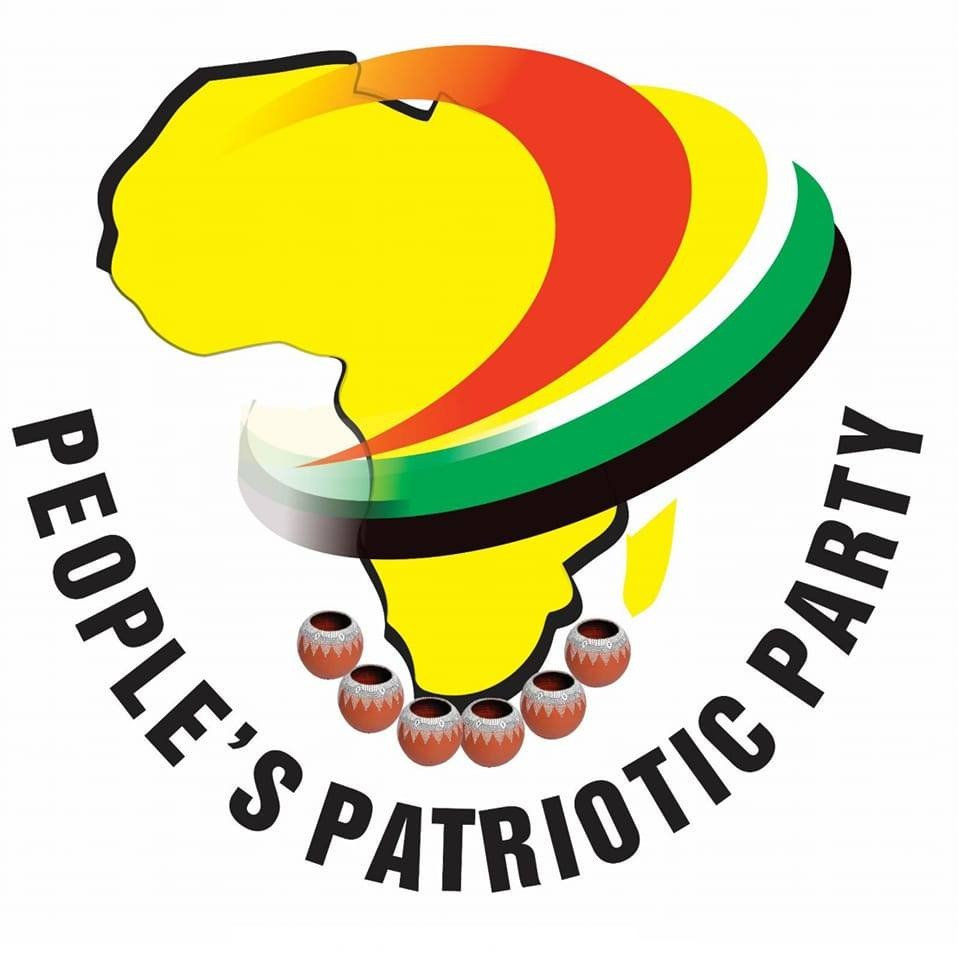

The People's Patriotic Party is a Zimbabwean opposition party that is led by Zvaringeni Samuel Chasi, its founding president.

== Election boycott ==
In June 2023, the People’s Patriotic Party, led by Chasi, announced its boycott of the 2023 Zimbabwean general election, scheduled for August 23, 2023.

They cited concerns over what they said were a lack of free and fair conditions and the absence of civil rights representation. Comparing the situation to past injustices, they accused the ruling ZANU–PF party of violence and manipulation of key institutions, citing the recent introduction of what they said was restrictive legislation.
