= Corruption in Zimbabwe =

Corruption in Zimbabwe has become endemic within its political, private and civil sectors.

== Corruption in the public sector ==
The findings of a 2000 survey commissioned by Transparency International Zimbabwe found that Zimbabwean citizens regarded the public sector as the most corrupt sector in the country. In this survey respondents favoured the police as being most corrupt followed by political parties, parliament/legislature, public officials/civil servants and the judiciary. In 2008, a Transparency International director announced that Zimbabwe loses US$5 million to corruption every day.

On Transparency International's 2025 Corruption Perceptions Index, Zimbabwe scored 22 on a scale from 0 ("highly corrupt") to 100 ("very clean"). When ranked by score, Zimbabwe ranked 157th among the 182 countries in the Index, where the country ranked first is perceived to have the most honest public sector. For comparison with regional scores, the best score among sub-Saharan African countries (Note: Angola, Benin, Botswana, Burkina Faso, Burundi, Cameroon, Cape Verde, Central African Republic, Chad, Comoros, Côte d'Ivoire, Democratic Republic of the Congo, Djibouti, Equatorial Guinea, Eritrea, Eswatini, Ethiopia, Gabon, Gambia, Ghana, Guinea, Guinea-Bissau, Kenya, Lesotho, Liberia, Madagascar, Malawi, Mali, Mauritania, Mauritius, Mozambique, Namibia, Niger, Nigeria, Republic of the Congo, Rwanda, Sao Tome and Principe, Senegal, Seychelles, Sierra Leone, Somalia, South Africa, South Sudan, Sudan, Tanzania, Togo, Uganda, Zambia, and Zimbabwe.) was 68, the average was 32 and the worst was 9. For comparison with worldwide scores, the best score was 89 (ranked 1), the average was 42, and the worst was 9 (ranked 181, in a two-way tie).

== Diamond trade ==
In 2011, Finance Minister Tendai Biti claimed that at least US$1 billion in diamond-related revenue owed to the national treasury remains unaccounted for. Biti has blamed corruption, misappropriation and a lack of transparency for the systematic underselling of diamonds and the failure to recoup losses. In an address to parliament, Biti said "it is worrying that there is no connection whatsoever between diamond exports made by Zimbabwe and the revenues realised thereof".

President Robert Mugabe and his politburo have also come under criticism for making personal benefits by assigning lucrative concessions in the Marange diamond fields to Chinese firms and the Zimbabwean military. The Zimbabwean military, which oversees the Marange fields, has been accused of systematic human rights abuses and smuggling of diamonds to neighbouring Mozambique.

== ZimBank Lottery ==
In January 2000, Fallot Chawaua, the Master of Ceremonies of a promotional lottery organised by the Zimbabwe Banking Corporation, announced that Robert Mugabe won the Z$100,000 first prize jackpot. The lottery was open to all clients who had kept Z$5,000 or more in their ZimBank accounts.

== Indigenisation bills ==
In March 2008, President Mugabe formally approved the Indigenisation and Economic Empowerment Bill, which gave the government the right to seize a controlling 51% stake in foreign and white-owned businesses. There are wide concerns that the beneficiaries of this Bill will be members of the ruling Zimbabwean elite, particularly after the enforcement of the Land Acquisition Act of 1992 and the Land Reform and Resettlement Programme Phase 2 of 1998 led to the misappropriation of commercial farm land and violent land invasions.

== Anti-corruption efforts ==
Anti-corruption efforts in Zimbabwe are governed by the following legislation:

- The Prevention of Corruption Act (1983);
- Public Service Act (1995);
- The Ombudsperson Amendment Act (1997);
- Anti-Corruption Commission Bill (2004);
- The Criminal Law (Codification and Reform) Act (2004);
- Bank Use Promotion and Suppression of Money Laundering Act (2004);
- Criminal Procedure and Evidence Amendment Act (2004); and
- Criminal Law (Codification and Reform) Act of 2006

The Zimbabwean Anti-Corruption Commission (ACC) was established after the passing of the Anti-Corruption Commission Bill in June 2004. The commission is a signatory to the Southern Africa Development Community (SADC) Protocol as well as the African Union (AU) and the United Nations Convention on Anti-Corruption. However, according to a 2009 report by Global Integrity, the commission is highly inefficient and “has very little authority to take steps aimed at stopping corruption in Zimbabwe”. Out of 147 corruption cases reviewed by the Commission in 2006, only four were completed. The ACC is currently chaired by Denfor Chirindo, who was appointed on 1 September 2011.

== List of corruption scandals ==
Here is a list of reported corruption scandals in Zimbabwe since 1980:

- 1987 – Zisco Steel blast Furnace Scandal
- 1987 – Air Zimbabwe Fokker Plane Scandal – $100 million
- 1986 – National Railways Housing Scandal
- 1988 – Willowgate Scandal
- 1989 – ZRP Santana Scandal
- 1994 – War Victims Compensation Scandal
- 1995 – GMB Grain Scandal
- 1996 – VIP Housing Scandal
- 1998 – Boka Banking Scandal
- 1998 – ZESA YTL Soltran Scandal
- 1998 – Telecel Scandal
- 1998 – Harare City Council Refuse Tender Scandal
- 1999 – Housing Loan Scandal
- 1999 – Noczim Scandal
- 1999 – DRC timber and diamond Un reported scandals
- 1999 – GMB Scandal
- 1999 – Ministry of water and rural development Chinese tender scandal
- 1999 – VIP Land Grab Scandal
- 2001 – Harare Airport Scandal
- 2008-2014 - Airport Road Scandal
- 2016 - Mnangagwa Command Agriculture Scandal
- Emmerson Dambudzo Mnangagwa
- 2018 - Zesa scam Involving Samuel Undenge's criminal abuse of office
- 2019 - Command Agriculture ( $3 Billion looted through fraudulent agricultural inputs scheme )
- 2020 - COVID-19 Masks Scheme ( $60 million looted with Prices of a single Mask Inflated to $500 per mask)
- 2025 Cancer Machine Scheme( Given yo known Presidential Affiliate with 450 million looted)
