= The Financial Gazette =

Weekly English language newspaper in Zimbabwe

- Type: Weekly newspaper
- Owner: Modus Publications
- Founded: 1969
- Language: English
- Headquarters: Harare, Zimbabwe
- Circulation: 366,000 (2003)
- Website: www.financialgazette.co.zw

The Financial Gazette is a weekly English language newspaper published in Zimbabwe. The paper, established in 1969, focuses on business, finance, and politics throughout Southern Africa. Headquartered in Harare, the paper also maintains a bureau in Bulawayo. Its slogan is "Southern Africa's Leading Business and Financial Newspaper".

The Financial Gazette's distribution numbered 40,000 copies weekly in 2000, but surveys have placed readership of the printed edition at ten times that number, or 400,000 weekly. The paper's website attracts over one million hits per month, leading the publisher to claim that The Financial Gazette is Zimbabwe's most widely read newspaper.

Operating under the repressive regime of Zimbabwe's President Robert Mugabe, questions have arisen regarding whether The Financial Gazette is truly independent and able to act as a free press. While once verifiably independent, persistent rumors have circulated that Mugabe's government now owns and controls the paper, having acted in 2002 to force a sale of the paper to a governmental intelligence agency. Government sources have refused to either confirm or deny the veracity of these rumours. However as of May 2006 the newspaper continues to publish articles highly critical of the government.

== See also ==
- List of newspapers in Zimbabwe
- Media of Zimbabwe
- Zimbabwe Metro
