= Daily News (Harare) =

Zimbabwean independent newspaper

The Daily News
- Type: Daily newspaper
- Format: Broadsheet
- Owner: Associated Newspapers Group
- Founder: Geoffrey Nyarota
- Founded: 1999
- Headquarters: Harare
- Website: www.dailynews.co.zw

The Daily News is a Zimbabwean independent newspaper published in Harare. It was founded in 1999 by Geoffrey Nyarota, a former editor of the Bulawayo Chronicle. Bearing the motto "Telling it like it is", the Daily News swiftly became Zimbabwe's most popular newspaper. However, the paper also suffered two bombings, allegedly by Zimbabwean security forces. Nyarota was arrested six times and reportedly was the target of a government assassination plot. After being forced from the paper by new management in December 2002, Nyarota left Zimbabwe. The News was banned by the government in September 2003.

In May 2010, a government commission granted the paper the right to re-open.

== Founding ==
In 1989, Geoffrey Nyarota helped to break the Willowgate scandal with the Bulawayo Chronicle. The investigation led to the resignation of five ministers of President Robert Mugabe's government, but also resulted in Nyarota being removed from his post.

After some years in exile, Nyarota founded the Daily News, an independent daily newspaper, in 1999. The paper stated that it would be neither "pro-government" nor "anti-government", but would "be a medium for vibrant discourse among the divergent political, social, religious and other groups of Zimbabwe", as well as fight for press freedom and freedom of speech. Its first issue appeared on 21 March 1999. The newspaper's motto was "Telling it like it is".

Within a year, the newspaper had passed the circulation of the state-owned Herald, with a daily circulation of 105,000 copies; the Herald's circulation was reported to have fallen by 50% during the same period.

== Conflict with Mugabe government ==
President Mugabe accused the paper of being a "mouthpiece" for the Movement for Democratic Change, a political coalition opposed to his rule, while Nyarota asserted that the paper was independent and criticised both parties.

During his editorship of the Daily News, Nyarota was arrested six times. On 1 August 2000, the News reported that Zimbabwe's secret police, the Central Intelligence Organisation, had sent a man named Bernard Masara to kill Nyarota; however, after meeting Nyarota in a lift, Masara changed his mind and warned him of the plot. Masara then called his employer with the paper's editors listening so that they could verify the source of the plan.

On 22 April 2000, a bomb was thrown into the paper's offices, but no one was hurt. South African Associated Press photographer Obed Zilwa was arrested for the attack, but the newspaper alleged that agents of Mugabe's security forces had thrown the bomb. Zilwa was released without charge 48 hours later. In January 2001, the News building was bombed again, this time destroying its printing presses. According to the Committee to Protect Journalists, "credible sources" linked the Zimbabwean military to the attack.

The paper also came into conflict with the pro-ZANU Zimbabwe National Liberation War Veterans Association (ZNLWVA), an organisation accused by human rights and opposition groups of voter intimidation and invading white-owned farms on behalf of Mugabe's government. On 6 June 2000, the group's head, Chenjerai Hunzvi, warned that he was giving the paper its "last warning" to stop criticising Mugabe. Three days later, ZNLWVA members took the paper from newsstands in Kwekwe and burned them. The following month, ZNLWVA members severely beat News staffer Chengetai Zvauya for his reporting on the group.

On 30 December 2002, Nyarota resigned as editor of the Daily News, to avoid his firing by the paper's new executive chair. The paper was shut down by the government in September 2003. A court order stated that the paper could re-open in December of that year, but when the paper prepared an eight-page edition for release, riot police arrived to shut down their printing press and blockade the building. Four top members of the News staff were charged with illegal attempts to publish, but were acquitted in September 2004.

== 2010 return ==
In May 2010, a governmental media commission granted the right to publish a daily newspaper to four publications, among them the Daily News.

== Awards ==
During Nyarota's tenure as editor-in-chief, he won several awards for his work with the News. In 2001, the Committee to Protect Journalists awarded him its International Press Freedom Award, which recognises journalists who show courage in defending press freedom despite facing attacks, threats, or imprisonment. The World Association of Newspapers awarded him its Golden Pen of Freedom Award in 2002. That same year he was also awarded UNESCO's Guillermo Cano World Press Freedom Prize.

Daily News Live is a 24-hour news channel based on the newspaper.

== Notable people ==
- Itai Dzamara, journalist.
- Pedzisai Ruhanya, former news editor
