= Angus Shaw (writer) =

Zimbabwean journalist and novelist (born 1949)

- Born: February 1949 (age 76); Salisbury, Zimbabwe
- Occupation: Journalist; novelist

Angus Shaw (born February 1949 in Salisbury, now Harare) is a Zimbabwean journalist and novelist.

== Life ==
Born in 1949, Shaw was orphaned in 1958, and sent to England for school. He joined the Rhodesia Herald in 1972. In 1975, he was conscripted into the Rhodesian Security Forces, but deserted to report on nationalist exiles in Lusaka and Dar es Salaam. He worked for the state-controlled Sunday Mail newspaper. He reported on Idi Amin's Ugandan death camps, and Somalia. In February 2005, he was jailed for reporting on Robert Mugabe during the decline of Zimbabwe. He reports for the Associated Press.

== Works ==
- Kandaya: another time, another place. Baobab Books. 1993. ISBN 978-0-908311-60-6.
- Mutoko Madness. Boundary Books. 2013. ISBN 978-0797454934.
