= Postal orders of Rhodesia =

Postal orders of Rhodesia were issued some time after the UDI, but it is not yet known when they began to be issued.

== Pre-decimal currency issue ==
A 5 Shillings issued at Norton in 1967 has been confirmed.

== Dual-currency issue ==
These were issued as part of the preparation for the change over to decimal currency, which occurred on the 17 February 1970. These continued to be issued after Prime Minister Ian Smith's declaration of Rhodesia as a republic on 2 March 1970.

== Decimal currency issue ==
These were issued after the majority of the dual-currency issue was exhausted. It is not yet known when these began to be issued. The last day of issue was 17 April 1980. The postal orders issued between 12 December 1979 and 17 April 1980 are quite sought after by postal order collectors.

== Remainder issues ==
These began to be issued on 18 April 1980. They were issued as late as 1982, including some of the dual-currency issue. It is not yet known when these were exhausted and replaced by the postal orders of Zimbabwe.

== See also ==
- Postal Orders of Zimbabwe
