= Zimbabwe Metro =

Internet newspaper based in Zimbabwe

- Company type: Private
- Website type: Blogging
- Available in: English
- Founded: October 2007
- Headquarters: Gaborone, Botswana
- Owner: Private
- Founder: Asher Mutsengi
- Employees: 12
- Website: zimbabwemetro.com
- Registration: Optional
- Launched: 2007
- Current status: Defunct

Zimbabwe Metro (zimbabwemetro.com) was an internet newspaper published in Zimbabwe. It had a strong focus on events in Zimbabwe's major cities. The newspaper was first published independently in 2007.

The paper's website is an aggregated weblog, featuring hyperlinks to various news sources and columnists. The site covers a wide range of topics, including sections devoted to politics, entertainment, media, living, and business. Its roster of bloggers includes many people from Zimbabwe's politicians to its extensive network of prominent writers. It is ranked the most visited news weblog on Zimbabwe News by Alexa Internet.

The paper seems to have become defunct online between July 2012 and January 2014. (Note: There appear to be claims the name "zimmetro" is also associated with "Zimbabwe Metro". As of November 2019 there is a live website associated with "zimmetro" which has been in operation since 2016, but no connection has been established between it and the Zimbabwe Metro.)

== History ==
Zimbabwe Metro was launched on October 10, 2007, as a news and commentary outlet. It was based in neighbouring Botswana.

The paper seems to have become defunct online between July 2012 and January 2014. (Note: The archive of the home page on 24 July 2012 seems to show stories stale by about 7 days; the next archive on 5 January 2014 showed the site as not available)

== Contributors ==
In addition to regular (often daily) news by its reporters and a core group of contributors the Zimbabwe Metro has featured notable celebrity contributors from politics, journalism, business, and entertainment. The Zimbabwe Metro offers both news commentary and coverage. It has a standing policy of encouraging comments from all parts of the political spectrum. The comment section is home to discussions on politics, religion, and world affairs.

A comprehensive list of contributors to the Zimbabwe Metro blog can be found at Contributors .

== Circulation ==
Zimbabwe Metro 's print edition 's circulation has been put on hold due to the economic conditions in Zimbabwe. However its website is popular, updated frequently and accessible for free since November 2007.

The format of the newspaper was tabloid and is designed to be read in 20 minutes. The features section contains a mix of articles on travel, homes, style, health and so on, as well as extensive arts coverage and entertainment listings.

== Controversy ==
The Zimbabwe Metro's Metro girl section featuring scant dressed women was once suspended as it was a consistent subject of controversy and criticism throughout the Zimbabwean community.

== Other info ==
=== Other names ===
==== Short names ====
- Zimbabwe Metro is known in its shortened form as the zimmetro.

== See also ==
- Media of Zimbabwe
- List of newspapers in Zimbabwe

== Sources ==
- "Zimbabwe new media evades censors". BBC news Africa. 7 August 2008. Archived from the original on 7 August 2008.
- The Guardian: Zimbabwe power-sharing deal: LIVE
- BBC Newsnight Zimbabwe's best blog
- Reuters Zimbabwe bloggers wait impatiently
