= 98.4 Midlands =

Gweru; Zimbabwe
- Broadcast area: Gweru & Midlands
- Frequency: FM 98.4 MHz

Programming
- Language: English; Ndebele; Shona
- Format: Music, Talk, News

Ownership
- Owner: AB Communications
- Sister stations: ZiFM Stereo; Hevoi FM

Technical information
- Licensing authority: BAZ

Links
- Website: www.984midlands.co.zw

98.4 Midlands is a privately owned provincial commercial radio station broadcasting from Gweru, Zimbabwe. It is accessible on FM 98.4 MHz in the city of Gweru and greater parts of the Midlands Province of Zimbabwe.

The station first began broadcasting in 2016, with live broadcasts beginning in 2017. A Gweru-based musician interviewed by the Zimbabwe Standard praised 98.4 Midlands, saying that it would highlight local musical talent that had previously been overshadowed. The Zimbabwe Broadcasting Corporation launched a second commercial radio station in Gweru in 2018.
