= Hevoi FM =

Masvingo; Zimbabwe
- Broadcast area: Masvingo Province
- Frequency: FM 100.2 MHz

Programming
- Language: English; Ndebele; Shona
- Format: Music, Talk, News

Ownership
- Owner: AB Communications
- Sister stations: ZiFM Stereo; 98.4 Midlands

Technical information
- Licensing authority: BAZ

Links
- Webcast: Listen Live
- Website: www.hevoifm.co.zw

Hevoi FM is the provincial commercial radio station based in Masvingo.
