= Her Zimbabwe =

Zimbabwean blog

Her Zimbabwe was a blog that highlighted the stories of Zimbabwean women. The website grew popular in 2012.
