= The Manica Post =

Regional newspaper in Manicaland province, Zimbabwe

- Type: Daily newspaper
- Owner(s): State-owned
- Publisher: Zimpapers
- Founded: 1983; 42 years ago
- Language: English
- Headquarters: Mutare, Zimbabwe
- Website: www.manicapost.co.zw

The Manica Post is a regional newspaper published in Manicaland province. It is owned by Zimpapers. It is the largest provincial newspaper publication in Zimbabwe. It is a sister newspaper to Herald Zimbabwe and others. It was first published on 13 December 1983. It is headquartered at 87 Hebert Chitepo Street, Mutare.
