= Enos Nkala =

Zimbabwean politician (1932-2013)

Minister of Defence
- In office 1985–1990
- Preceded by: Robert Mugabe
- Succeeded by: Richard Hove

Personal details
- Born: 23 August 1932
- Died: 21 August 2013(81 age)
- Party: ZANU-PF

Enos Mzombi Nkala (23 August 1932 – 21 August 2013) was one of the founders of the Zimbabwe African National Union.

== Political career ==
=== Role in ZANU-PF ===
During the Rhodesian Bush War, he served on the ZANU high command, or Dare reChimurenga as Treasurer (dura remusangano). When Nkala and most of the nationalists within the leadership were imprisoned, Paul Tangi Mhova Mkondo took over the role. Nkala was detained by the Rhodesian government at Gonakudzingwa for 12 years with the rest of the ZANU-PF (formed in Nkala's house in Highfields) leadership, consisting of Ndabaningi Sithole, Leopold Takawira, Robert Mugabe, Edgar Tekere and Morris Nyagumbo. When Edgar Tekere was in prison, he tabled the motion of having Sithole removed as the supreme leader and replaced by Mugabe. Nkala and Nyagumbo voted in favour of Mugabe (Mugabe abstained), making him leader.

Following independence in 1980, he served as Minister of Finance until 1983, when the portfolio was consolidated into Finance, Economic Planning and Development and handed over to senior minister Bernard Thomas Gibson Chidzero. Nkala moved sideways to become Minister of National Supplies until 1985 and Home Affairs and Defence after the 1985 election. As Defence Minister he was involved in the notorious Gukurahundi Genocide against the Ndebele people, although he issued a number of conflicting statements on the nature of his involvement.

Nkala stated that he regretted his role in the Gukurahundi and that he would never do it again. He described his involvement as "eternal hell" and publicly blamed Mugabe for ordering it. At the Imbovane YaMhlabezulu meeting held in Bulawayo on 26 February 1998, Nkala, who was a guest speaker alongside Joseph Msika (National Chairman of ZANU-PF), repeatedly denied involvement in Gukurahundi.

While serving as Zimbabwe's Home Affairs Minister, Nkala rejected allegations by Amnesty International, the London-based human rights organisation, which had reported beatings, electric shocks and other torture at government detention camps after the July 2006 general election.

Nkala claimed to have written a book chronicling ZANU-PF since its formation, including the Gukurahundi massacre and the assassinations of high-profile politicians using car accidents. He blamed the death of ZANU figures Josiah Tongogara and Herbert Chitepo and others on Mugabe. He is alleged to have had an affair with Sally Mugabe.

== Willowgate scandal ==
While a minister in the ZANU-PF government, Nkala became embroiled in the 'Willowgate' scandal, concerning the allocation of new motor vehicles to government officials, especially ministers, by Willowvale Motors in Willowvale Harare. The vehicles were subsequently sold at a huge profit. The scandal was eternalised in song by Solomon Skuza, a Ndebele musician, in the hit single 'Love and Scandals', in which he asks "how can someone buy a car and sell it again?" a reference to the scandal.

== 2008 election ==
On 21 April 2008, following the March 2008 presidential election, Nkala urged his "colleagues to let President Mugabe retire with dignity".

== Death ==
Enos Nkala died on 21 August 2013 at a hospital in Harare after a heart attack. He was 81.

Political offices
Preceded by Role Not Created	Treasurer (Dura ReMusangano) ZANU	Next: Paul Tangi Mhova Mkondo
