= Solomon Skuza =

Solomon "Jah Solo" Skuza
- Also known as: Solomon Skuza
- Born: Solomon Skuza; 13 December 1954; Plumtree, Zimbabwe
- Died: 14 May 1995 (aged 40)
- Genres: Pop
- Occupations: Singer-songwriter dancer
- Instruments: Vocals guitar multi-instruments
- Years active: 1980–1995
- Label: ZMC

Solomon Skuza (1954–1995), also known as Jah Solo, was a Zimbabwean musician, one of the most popular to come out of Plumtree. In addition to his native Kalanga, he wrote lyrics in Ndebele, Shona and English as well. Other popular Kalanga musicians include Nduna Malaba (Ndux Malax), Ndolwane Super Sounds, Mokis Connection and Solomon's brother Chase Skuza.

== Biography ==
Born in 1954 in Plumtree, Solomon Skuza went into exile in Zambia during the Rhodesian Bush War to join the Zimbabwe People's Revolutionary Army (ZIPRA). Skuza played in the ZIPRA band and entertained guerrillas at ZIPRA camps. He later became the band leader and an official composer for the ZIPRA Entertainment Corps.

In 1980, Skuza returned to Zimbabwe and produced a hit single, Banolila, which sold over 75,000 copies. His 1990 album, Love and Scandals, was a commercial and critical success, due to its political content regarding the Willowgate Scandal of the time. In one song, he asks, "how can someone buy a car and sell it again?" In another, he sings of his love leaving him for "a guy who owns a Cressida", referring to the Toyota Cressidas assembled at Willowvale. It was this album that earned him the nickname "Jah Solo."

Solomon Skuza was backed by bands such as Fallen Heroes. He named the band "Fallen Heroes" to honor those who had died during the Liberation Struggle. He released Zihlangene Vol. 1 and Zihlangene Vol. 2 compilation albums which cover his earlier and later hits, respectively. Solomon sang in his native Kalanga and both Ndebele, English and Shona.

In 1990 he did a soundtrack, Patimile, for the Zimbabwean film Jit.

== Sickness and Death ==
Solomon was shot during 5v 6-y the war that is why he could not dance during his performances. The actual cause of Solomon Skuza's death remains unknown. During his sickness period, Solomon was taken to some traditional healers (known as 'inyanga') but, they could not ascertain his cause of sickness. He also went to doctors who, like the nyangas, could not see anything. Consequently, Solomon died in 1995....

== Discography ==
=== Albums ===
- Kudzanayi
- Love and Scandals
- Zihlangene Vol. 1
- Zihlangene Vol. 2
- Zlhlangene Vol. 3
