= Willowgate =

1988–89 Zimbabwean political scandal

Willowgate was a 1988–89 political scandal in Zimbabwe involving the illegal resale of automobile purchases by various government officials, uncovered by The Bulawayo Chronicle. The ensuing investigation resulted in the resignations of five members of President Robert Mugabe's cabinet. One of the five, Maurice Nyagumbo, later committed suicide after being charged with perjury. The reporters who had broken the story, Geoffrey Nyarota and Davison Maruziva, were subsequently removed from their posts.

== Background ==
In the 1980s, Zimbabwe faced a serious shortage of motor vehicles, and was one of the few countries in the world where the number of registered automobiles had declined in the previous few years. The cause of this scarcity was a shortage of foreign exchange reserves, which prevented the country from importing enough vehicles to meet demand. Part of the reason for this was that Zimbabwe was paying off its foreign debt on schedule, rather than extending payments over a longer period like most other African countries at the time. In the year before the scandal, one-third of Zimbabwe's $1.8 billion in foreign income went to debt payments, with most of the rest spent on oil imports and the military. Emmerson Mnangagwa was also implicated in this scandal.

At the time, there were only two legal importers of cars into Zimbabwe: Willowvale Motor Industries, located in Willowvale, Harare, and a sister plant, which assembled Mazda, Toyota, and Peugeot vehicles from imported kits. Willowvale was a subsidiary of IDC, a parastatal, and its board was chaired by the permanent secretary of the Ministry of Industry and Commerce. The foreign currency shortage had caused production to fall from a peak of 7,430 vehicles in 1982 to only 2,416 in 1988. At the Willowvale plant in Harare, which had the capacity to assembly 4,500 cars a year, just 1,400 were produced in 1987. Meanwhile, the government estimated that the country needed more than 20,000 new vehicles each year to replace old ones and meet new demand. With a backlog of 100,000 vehicles, purchasing a new car became nearly impossible for many in Zimbabwe, and many dealerships stopped taking names on waiting lists. At the time, the law prioritised government ministers and members of parliament for new car purchases, allowing them to skip the waiting list on the grounds that they needed vehicles to carry out official business.

Unable to purchase a car at home, many Zimbabweans pooled their vacation allowances—roughly $200 in foreign exchange per family member—to purchase used cars in neighboring countries like Botswana. Many of these cars were in poor condition, and the government closed the holiday loophole in 1988, concerned that the foreign purchases were costing $5 million a year in foreign currency. In response to ballooning prices, the government set price controls on motor vehicle sales. A black market emerged for new and second-hand vehicles, and dealers and sellers found ways to circumvent these controls. The government commission set up to investigate the Willowgate scandal was told of "undesirable practices" taking place in this context, including part exchange arrangements in which dealers asked customers who wanted a new car to provide a used one in exchange, which they would then resell at a much higher price. Some dealers also evaded price controls by selling vehicles indirectly at an uncontrolled price through a connected third party and splitting the profit.

== Scandal ==
In October 1988, member of parliament Obert Mpofu accidentally received a cheque from a car company in Willowvale, an industrial area of Harare; the cheque had actually been intended for Alford Mpofu, a friend of Industry Minister Callistus Ndlovu. Obert Mpofu took the cheque to Geoffrey Nyarota, editor of the state-owned Bulawayo Chronicle. The paper, which had already built a reputation for aggressive investigations into government corruption, began to investigate.

In the weeks following their discovery of the cheque, Nyarota and deputy editor Davison Maruziva learned that ministers and officials from the government of President Robert Mugabe had been given early access to buy foreign cars at the Willowvale assembly plant. In some cases, the cars were bought wholesale and resold at a 200% profit. Implicated ministers included Ndlovu, Political Affairs Minister Maurice Nyagumbo, Defense Minister Enos Nkala and Minister of State for Political Affairs, Frederick Shava, who was later elected as President of the UN Economic and Social Affairs Council in 2016. The newspaper published documents from the plant to prove its case, including identification numbers from the vehicles.

== Consequences ==
In December 1988, Mugabe appointed a three-person panel, the Sandura Commission, to investigate the allegations. The Washington Post reported that the commission's hearings "struck a deep chord" in Zimbabwe, where citizens had grown to resent the perceived growing corruption of government. A provincial governor and five of Mugabe's cabinet ministers eventually resigned due to implication in the scandal, including Shava, Nkala and Nyagumbo, who at the time was the third highest-ranking official in Mugabe's party, the Zimbabwe African National Union (ZANU). Nyagumbo committed suicide by drinking pesticide. Other officials who resigned after being implicated in the scandal included Higher Education Minister Dzingai Mutumbuka, Matabeleland North Governor Jacob Mudenda, and Deputy Minister of Sport and Culture Charles Ndlovu.

Nyarota and Maruziva were both forced out of their jobs with the state-owned Chronicle and into newly created public relations positions in Harare. Though the men were given pay raises, Mugabe also stated that the move was a result of their "overzealousness", leading to public perception that they had been removed for their reporting. ZANU politicians also criticized Nyarota and Maruziva, with Minister of State for National Security Emmerson Mnangagwa stating that criticism was welcome, but "to the extent that the press now deliberately target government as their enemy, then we part ways."

== In popular culture ==
The scandal featured prominently in the lyrics of Solomon Skuza's album Love and Scandals. In one song, he asks, "how can someone buy a car and sell it again?" In another, he sings of his lover leaving him for "a guy who owns a Cressida", referring to the Toyota Cressidas assembled at Willowvale.

The scandal was fictionalized in George Mujajati's novel The Sun Will Rise Again as the "Sisida Scandal".

== See also ==
- Corruption in Zimbabwe
- List of -gate scandals and controversies
