= The Herald (Zimbabwe) =

Zimbabwean daily newspaper

- Herald House, Harare
- Type: Daily newspaper
- Owner: State-owned
- Publisher: Zimpapers
- Editor: Hatred Zenenga
- Founded: 1892; 134 years ago
- Language: English
- Headquarters: Harare, Zimbabwe
- Circulation: 60,000
- Website: www.herald.co.zw

The Herald is a state-owned daily newspaper published in Harare, the capital of Zimbabwe.

== History ==
=== Origins ===
The newspaper's origins date back to the 19th century. Its forerunner was launched on 27 June 1891 by William Fairbridge for the Argus group of South Africa. Named the Mashonaland Herald and Zambesian Times, it was a weekly, hand-written news sheet produced using the cyclostyle duplicating process. In October the following year it became a printed newspaper and changed its name to The Rhodesia Herald.

The Argus group later set up a subsidiary called the Rhodesian Printing and Publishing Company to run its newspapers in what was then Southern Rhodesia.

The front page of the Rhodesia Herald's 12 November 1965 edition. Note the blank spaces where content was removed by state censors.

After the white minority Rhodesian Front government unilaterally declared independence on 11 November 1965, it started censoring The Rhodesia Herald. The newspaper responded by leaving blank spaces where articles had been removed, enabling readers to gauge the extent of the censorship.

=== After Independence ===
In 1981, after Zimbabwe became independent, the government bought The Herald and other papers from the Argus group, using a US$20 million grant from Nigeria, and established the Zimbabwe Mass Media Trust to operate them. The Trust created Zimbabwe Newspapers, Ltd., as the publisher of the papers.

In mid-May 2008, its website was briefly shut down by cyber hackers.

For Robert Mugabe's 93rd birthday, the state-owned newspaper issued a 24-page supplement packed with goodwill messages from government departments.

== Sister papers ==
Other newspapers published by the same group include The Sunday Mail in Harare, The Chronicle and Sunday News in Bulawayo and the Manica Post in Mutare. The Chronicle, launched in October 1894 as The Bulawayo Chronicle, is the second oldest newspaper in the country.

== Controversy ==
The Herald has for some time been noted for its slant in favor of President Robert Mugabe and the Zanu-PF party, and its demonisation of the opposition party, the Movement for Democratic Change (MDC). It often accuses the MDC of being agents of colonial powers.

The Herald faces limited competition from within Zimbabwe, mainly from independent newspapers, such as The Independent, due to very restrictive accreditation laws. Many opposition media claim that the paper has evolved into an instrument of rather crude and aggressive propaganda.

== Editors ==
- 1892–1896: William Fairbridge
- 1898–1903: T. Shillington
- 1911–1915: C. D. Don
- 1915–1927: R. H. Douglas
- 1927–1931: W. Addison
- 1931–1955: Norman Ferris
- 1956–1962: C. J. Cowan
- 1962–1967: Malcom Smith
- 1967–1970: Sydney Swadel
- 1970–1974: Rhys Meier
- 1975–1980: Roland Fothergill
- 1980–1981: Robin Drew
- 1981–1982: Farayi Munyuki
- 1983–1998: Tommy Sithole
- 1998–2000: Bornwell Chakaodza
- 2000–2001: Ray Mungoshi
- 2001–2009: Pikirayi Deketeke
- 2009–2012: William Chikoto
- 2012–2013: Innocent Gore
- 2013–2018: Caesar Zvayi
- 2018–2019: Joram Nyathi
- 2019: Tichaona Zindoga (acting)
- 2019–2020: William Chikoto (acting)
- 2020–2024: Hatred Zenenga
- 2024-Present: Victoria Ruzvidzo

== Notable staff ==
- Davison Maruziva, deputy editor
- Geoffrey Nyarota, hired in 1978 as one of the paper's first black reporters
- Chipo Sabeta, senior sports reporter
- William Saidi, early 1980s
- Angus Shaw, 1972–1974

== See also ==
- British South Africa Company Government Gazette (originally published as a supplement to The Herald.)
- Mass media in Zimbabwe
- List of newspapers in Zimbabwe
