= Net*One =

Parastatal telecom in Zimbabwe

NetOne
- Company type: State owned
- Industry: Telecommunications
- Founded: 1996
- Headquarters: Harare
- Products: Cellular telephony, digital TV
- Website: www.netone.co.zw

Net*One was the first cellular network operator in Zimbabwe based on the Global System for Mobile Communications. The company was originally launched during the World Solar Summit in September 1996 in the capital Harare with 500 lines. Service was extended to the second city of Bulawayo at the time of the International Trade Fair in April 1997. Net*One offers a basic telephone service, Vehicle Tracking System, Short Messaging Service, Broadband and International Roaming Services.

Net*One is now the second largest cellular company in Zimbabwe and has 4,472,592 subscribers in 2021.
