= Censorship and Entertainment Control Act, 1967 =

Censorship and Entertainments Control Act

Parliament of Zimbabwe (then Parliament of Rhodesia)
- Long title: An Act to prohibit or restrict the importation, production and dissemination of undesirable publications, pictures, statues and records.
- Citation: Act No. 37 of 1967
- Territorial extent: Zimbabwe
- Commenced: 1 December 1967
- Administered by: Minister of Law and Order

Amended by
- Censorship and Entertainments Control Amendment Act 22 of 2001
- Status: In force

The Censorship and Entertainments Control Act 1967 is an Act of Parliament in Zimbabwe. It was passed by the Parliament of Rhodesia in 1967 to target obscenity and blasphemy in literature and film. The Act repealed elements of the Entertainments Control and Censorship Act, 1932, the Subversive Activities Act, 1950, and the Emergency Powers (Control of Publications) Act, 1965. It was most frequently evoked by the Rhodesian government to censor sexual content in literary works or communist literature. Rhodesian era bans on literature for politically subversive content were reversed in 1980 after the country achieved internationally recognised independence as Zimbabwe.

However, the new Zimbabwean government continues to invoke the act to ban literature and films for obscenity, a broad label which it has extended to include explicit sexual content and positive portrayals of homosexuality. Artistic expression in the country continues to be significantly affected by legislation that established the Zimbabwe Board of Censors. The law requires artists, including musicians, to obtain certification before performing or publishing their work. Without this approval, their creative endeavors may be prohibited. Such artists include Raymond Majongwe, whose music is often critical of the government, and musician Thomas Mapfumo, known for revolutionary music. Their music has minimal airplay, a reflection of ongoing censorship practices. While censorship limits artistic expression through restrictive laws and economic barriers, several artists like Samantha Kureya and Winky D continue to engage the public through their work.

== See also ==
- Censorship in Zimbabwe
