= The Zimbabwean =

Newspaper in Zimbabwe

- A Voice for the Voiceless
- Type: Newspaper, website
- Format: Tabloid
- Founder: Wilf Mbanga
- Editor-in-chief: Cees van der Laan
- Founded: 2005
- Language: 2005
- City: London
- Country: England, South Africa
- Website: www.thezimbabwean.co

The Zimbabwean is a newspaper in Zimbabwe. Founded by Wilf Mbanga in 2005, it was edited in London and printed in South Africa, near the border with Zimbabwe. By 2021 it had become a weekly paper with a large online presence.

== Background ==
In 1999, Wilf Mbanga founded an independent Zimbabwean newspaper titled, with the goal of providing neutral coverage of events occurring in the country, but within three years Mbanga was arrested for anti-government activities. He was eventually acquitted, but was banned by the government, and Mbanga was declared an "Enemy of the People". Following several death threats, Mbanga fled to Europe, first to the Netherlands and then to England.

== Foundation, audience, and funding ==
With monetary assistance from the European Union, Mbanga founded The Zimbabwean, a newspaper featuring stories provided by in-country correspondents, edited in London, and printed in South Africa, close to the Zimbabwean border. As its primary audience the newspaper targeted the Zimbabwean diaspora: a million Zimbabweans lived in the UK, and another two million in Southern Africa. It was to be a weekly tabloid, according to Mbanga, with "a heavy emphasis on Zimbabwean politics, but will also include arts and culture, business, sports, gender issues, social issues and news analysis". Within five years, The Zimbabwean had a daily print run of 150,000, the majority of which was exported to Zimbabwe itself. However, in June 2008, the country's government re-classified the newspaper as a luxury, imposing a 55% tax on its import from South Africa. This made it impossible for the paper to break even at a price that the average citizen could afford. By 2009, circulation of the newspaper fell from 150,000 to 30,000, and the paper had to cancel its Sunday installment.

== 2009 crisis and advertising campaign ==
Following the government decision to tax the paper as luxury, The Zimbabwean got Johannesburg-based ad agency TBWA/Hunt/Lascaris to start an ad campaign. The pitch became the amount of currency used to purchase The Zimbabwean: after years of hyperinflation, the Zimbabwean Dollar had reached the point where the face value of many banknotes was less than the value of the paper itself. With a limited budget TBWA devised a campaign in which advertisements were printed on real banknotes, using the collapse of the currency as an analogy for the collapse of Zimbabwe itself. The campaign was launched in March 2009, using politically charged slogans and outdoor advertising, and became successful immediately both in Southern Africa and internationally. In the first week following the launch, hits to the paper's website spiked and by June 2009, sales of the paper had increased by 276%, according to TBWA/Hunt/Lascaris. In the end, finance minister Tendai Biti did away with the tax.

== Notable contributors ==
- Chenjerai Hove, Zimbabwean novelist, columnist for the paper
- Kumbirai Thierry Nhamo
- Eddie Cross
- Tendai Ruben Mbofana, Zimbabwean Writer & Journalist

== See also ==
- List of newspapers in Zimbabwe
