= Nyaminyami FM =

Kariba; Zimbabwe
- Broadcast area: Mash West
- Frequency: FM 94.5 MHz; FM 103.4 MHz

Programming
- Language: Tonga; Shona; Korekore; Mash West dialects
- Format: Talk Radio, Music, News

Ownership
- Owner: Kingstons Enterprises
- Sister stations: Capitalk 100.4 FM; Diamond FM; Star FM

Technical information
- Licensing authority: BAZ

Links
- Webcast: Listen Live
- Website: nyaminyamifm.co.zw

Nyaminyami FM is a provincial commercial radio station broadcasting from 438 Heights Drive, Kariba, Zimbabwe in 3 main languages namely Tonga, Korekore and Shona. It covers Mashonaland West province with 2 frequencies FM 94.5 MHz in Kariba, Makuti, Chirundu, Magunje amongst others and on 103.4 MHz from Karoi to Battlefields.

The station hosts one of the country's biggest annual events, the NyamiNyami Lakeside Festival, which attracts more than 50 000 people in October.
