= Zimbabwe Daily News =

Zimbabwe Daily News is an internet newspaper published in Zimbabwe and UK. The newspaper was first published independently in 2004 and is owned by 3MG Media.

== News and content ==
It has a strong focus on events in Zimbabwe's politics and current events. The site covers a wide range of topics, including sections devoted to politics, entertainment, media, Sports, living, and business. Its roster of bloggers and regular columnists include some prominent Zimbabweans such as Senator Obert Gutu, Eddie Cross MP and businessman Mutumwa Mawere.

It is ranked number 15 Zimbabwe site by Alexa ranking and its stories are occasionally taken up by the print media.

== Campaigns and fora ==
The site has run various current affairs and political campaigns, such as calling for the deportation of Robert Mugabe's daughter Bona from Hong Kong, and more generally for the deportation of individuals with strong links to the Government of Zimbabwe from western countries. Together with the Zimbabwe Telegraph, Zimbabwe Daily News hosts an online forum for Zimbabwean current affairs and society.

== Criticism ==
Zimbabwe Daily News has been accused of poor journalistic style and failing to sufficiently verify facts, for example on its reporting of the 2007 Zimbabwean coup d'état attempt.
