= Diamond FM (Zimbabwe) =

Zimbabwe radio station

Mutare; Zimbabwe
- Broadcast area: Manicaland
- Frequency: FM 103.8 MHz

Programming
- Language: English & Manicaland dialects
- Format: Talk Radio, Music, News

Ownership
- Owner: Zimbabwe Newspapers PVT LTD
- Sister stations: Nyaminyami FM; Star FM; Capitalk 100.4 FM

History
- First air date: 13 May 2016

Technical information
- Licensing authority: BAZ

Links
- Webcast: Listen Live
- Website: diamondfm.co.zw

Diamond FM 103.8 FM is Mutare and Manicaland's only commercial radio station. The station broadcasts in English and locally spoken languages and dialects of the region. The radio station is based at Manica Post building. Diamond FM is also available on Livestream.
