= Harare Tribune =

Zimbabwean online newspaper

The Harare Tribune
- Type: Daily online newspaper
- Format: Broadsheet
- Owner: The Harare Tribune News Company
- Publisher: Harare Tribune
- Staff writers: 16
- Founded: 2001
- Political alignment: Liberal
- Headquarters: 230 Nelson Mandela Ave. Harare, Zimbabwe
- Price: free
- Website: www.hararetribune.com

The Harare Tribune was an online daily newspaper published in Zimbabwe. It was based in Harare and had a staff of 16.

== Background ==
The Tribune was among a number of online newspapers that have come to the fore since the ZANU-PF government waged wars against the independent media around 2000.

== See also ==
- Zimbabwe Metro
