= Star FM Zimbabwe =

Radio station in Zimbabwe

Star FM
Zimbabwe
- Frequency: 89.7 MHz in Harare

Programming
- Languages: English; Ndebele; Shona
- Format: Urban contemporary

Ownership
- Owner: Zimbabwe Newspapers, Ltd.
- Sister stations: Diamond FM; Nyaminyami FM; Capitalk 100.4 FM

History
- First air date: 25 June 2012

Technical information
- Licensing authority: BAZ

Links
- Webcast: Listen Live
- Website: www.starfm.co.zw

Star FM is a commercial urban radio station that broadcasts throughout Zimbabwe from the country's capital, Harare.

It first aired in June 2012 and is owned by Zimbabwe Newspapers, which owns Bulawayo's The Chronicle, Harare's The Herald and several other regional publications. Zimpapers also owns a number of regional commercial radio stations including Diamond FM in Mutare, Nyaminyami FM in Kariba and Capitalk 100.4 FM in the capital Harare. In May 2018, Zimpapers was awarded a content distribution licence by the Broadcasting Authority of Zimbabwe and went on to launch Zimpapers Television (ZTN) which has been broadcasting online since launch.

The station took part in The Peter Johns Tribute that was multicasted on 2 May 2020 together with ZiFM Stereo and Power FM.

It is accessible throughout Zimbabwe on FM dial and worldwide through various streaming platforms, including its website and mobile app.
