= Willowvale, Harare =

Coordinates: 17°53′S 30°58′E

Willowvale is an industrial suburb in the South West of Harare, Zimbabwe. The area was a popular suburb for working class Southern European immigrants in the post war era but today is home to mostly black Zimbabweans and the descendants of Malawian, Mozambiquean and Zambian immigrants.

== Industry ==
Willowvale is home to numerous manufacturing businesses, notably in food production, vehicles, textiles and electronics. However, the suburb is best known as home of the city's Tobacco Auction Floors, located on Gleneagles Rd, and the world's largest tobacco auction. The floors are open to visitors with auctions and trading activity being the highlight of a visit.

== Willowgate ==
Willowvale gave its name to the 1988-89 "Willowgate" scandal, in which government officials were using their positions to purchase foreign automobiles from a Willowvale car company and then reselling them at high profits. The sales were exposed by Chronicle editors Geoffrey Nyarota and Davison Maruziva in a series of investigative reports, and led to a national scandal and commission of inquiry. A provincial governor and five ministers of the government of President Robert Mugabe resigned, one of whom, Maurice Nyagumbo, committed suicide.
