= The Chronicle (Zimbabwe) =

Newspaper in Bulawayo

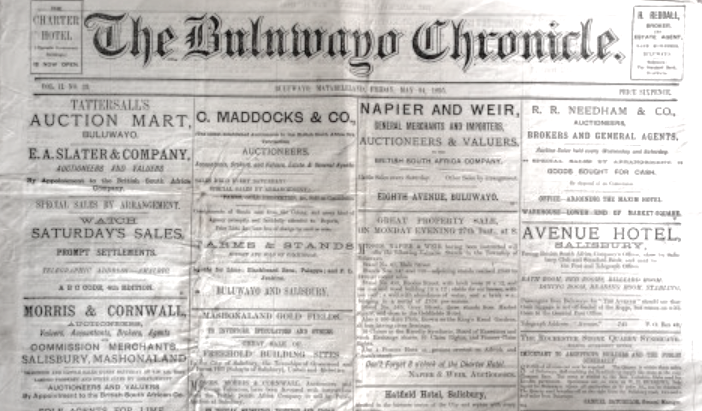
- Bulawayo Chronicle, 1895
- Type: Daily
- Owner: State-owned
- Publisher: Zimpapers
- Editor: Lawson Mabhena
- News editor: Clement Manyukwe
- Founded: 1894
- Language: English
- Headquarters: Bulawayo, Zimbabwe
- Sister newspapers: The Herald
- Website: https://www.chronicle.co.zw/

The Chronicle, founded as The Bulawayo Chronicle, is a popular daily newspaper in Zimbabwe. It is published in Bulawayo and mostly reports on news in the Matebeleland region in the southern part of the country. It is a state-owned outlet and therefore usually only publishes information that supports the government and its policies. It also covers stories on national and international news, as well as entertainment, sport, business, travel, job offers and real estate. It was established in 1894 and it was the largest newspaper in the country following The Herald.

== History ==
The Chronicle is one of the oldest newspapers in Africa. The Chronicle was founded by the Argus Company of South Africa on 12 October 1894.

The media in Rhodesia catered mostly to the white settlers needs, ignoring the news of interest to native Africans. Like most newspapers, The Chronicle covered politics, sports and current affairs, however news about the continent of Africa was ignored. News about the African population was seldom published, unless the news regarded crimes committed by Africans. When articles concerned Africans, the stories were typically negative and demeaning.

By the time Independence was attained in 1980, the media coverage in Zimbabwe had changed little. News coverage was still prone to a settler-bias as the most prominent Rhodesian printing and publishing executives in Rhodesia themselves were white. The editors, as well as most of the reporting staff, were also white.

The development of the Zimbabwe Press can be categorised into three eras. Prior to 1980, the era was considered the Colonial or Nationalist era. From 1980 to 1990 the media was in the Transitional Era. Media originating after 1990 is considered to be from the Post-Transitional era. During each era the political and ideological status of the country would reflect what kind of news would be published and how it would be published. The last white editor in Zimpapers was Jean Maitland-Stuart.

In 1983, Tommy Sithole became the first black editor of the Chronicle.

== Willowgate ==
In 1988, The Chronicle's editor was Geoffrey Nyarota. The paper built a reputation for aggressive investigations into corruption at all levels of government, and Nyarota became "something of a hero". In the "Willowgate" investigation, Nyarota and deputy editor Davison Maruziva reported that ministers and officials from the government of President Robert Mugabe had been given early access to buy foreign cars at an assembly plant in Willowvale, an industrial suburb of Harare. In some cases, the cars were bought wholesale and resold at a 200% profit. The newspaper published documents from the plant to prove its case, including identification numbers from the vehicles.

Mugabe appointed a three-person panel, the Sandura Commission, to investigate the allegations. The Washington Post reported that the commission's hearings "struck a deep chord" in Zimbabwe, where citizens had grown to resent the perceived growing corruption of government. Five of Mugabe's cabinet ministers eventually resigned due to implication in the scandal, including Defense Minister Enos Nkala and Maurice Nyagumbo, the third highest-ranking official in Mugabe's party, the Zimbabwe African National Union (ZANU).

However, Nyartora and Maruziva were both forced out of their jobs and into newly created public relations positions in Harare. Though the men were given pay raises, Mugabe also stated that the move was a result of their "overzealousness", leading to public belief that they had been removed for their reporting. ZANU parliamentarians also criticised Nyarota and Maruziva, with the Minister of State for National Security stating that criticism was welcome, but "to the extent that the press now deliberately target Government as their enemy, then we part ways."

== 2000s ==
The Chronicle was commonly considered a monopoly newspaper of Bulawayo after the printing of The Daily News was banned in 2003 due to its critical reporting of Mugabe's government.

In 2009, The Chronicle fired its editor, Stephen Ndlovu following an exposé on followers of the Minister of Information Jonathan Moyo.

Also in 2009, the subsequent editor of The Chronicle, Brezhnev Malaba, was charged with libel in a story which concerning police corruption. Nduduzo Tshuma, a staff reporter at the newspaper, was also charged with libel, following the publication of an article alleging that members of the police were involved in a Grain Marketing Board Maize Scandal.

== Staff ==
Current editor: Mduduzi Mathuthu

Reporters: Freedom Mupanedemo, Pamela Shumba, Prosper Ndlovu, Temba Dube, Thandeka Moyo, Mashudu Netsianda, Leornad Ncube, Auxillia Katongomara James Shikwati, Freeman Razemba, Factmore Dzobo, Givemore Muzariri, Oliver Kazunga, Lovemore Dube, Sikhanyisiwe Sibanda, Morris Mkwate,

Columnists: Stephen Mpofu, Sukulwenkosi Dube

Publisher: Zimpapers

== Sister papers ==
The Sunday News is the weekend version of The Chronicle. The Herald is the other well established newspaper published in Harare.

== See also ==
- Media of Zimbabwe
- List of newspapers in Zimbabwe
