= Capitalk 100.4 FM =

Harare; Zimbabwe
- Broadcast area: Harare & Mash Central
- Frequency: FM 100.4 MHz

Programming
- Language: English; Ndebele; Shona
- Format: Talk radio

Ownership
- Owner: ZimPapers Limited
- Sister stations: Star FM; Nyaminyami FM; Diamond FM

History
- First air date: 21 September 2016

Technical information
- Licensing authority: BAZ

Links
- Webcast: Listen Live
- Website: www.capitalkfm.co.zw

Capitalk 100.4 FM is a commercial talk radio station based in and broadcasts from Harare, Zimbabwe.

It is Zimbabwe's first commercial talk radio station. It broadcasts in the country's capital, focusing mainly on issues affecting the community of Harare and surroundings.

The station became the first in the country to host a live radio interview with the country's president, Emmerson Mnangagwa where the listeners got a chance to interact and ask questions to the president through phone calls, social media and text messages.
