= ZiFM Stereo =

Harare; Zimbabwe
- Broadcast area: Zimbabwe
- Frequency: FM 106.7 MHz in Bulawayo

Programming
- Language: English; Ndebele; Shona
- Format: Contemporary Hit Radio

Ownership
- Owner: AB Communications
- Sister stations: 98.4 Midlands: Hevoi FM

History
- First air date: August 15, 2012

Technical information
- Licensing authority: BAZ

Links
- Webcast: Listen Live
- Website: zifmstereo.co.zw

ZiFM Stereo is a Zimbabwean private commercial radio station that is based in the country's capital, Harare. It broadcasts throughout the country on FM.

It began broadcasting on 15 August 2012. It is Zimbabwe's first free to air radio station to stream online. It is also known to be the country's first privately owned radio station. It was launched just months after the launch of the state owned Star FM, which started broadcasting on 25 June of the same year.

ZiFM took part in the historical tribute to the veteran Zimbabwean broadcaster, Peter Johns who died in London on 27 April 2020. The hour-long multicast that took place on 2 May 2020 was also streamed live on Power FM and Star FM.

The station's format is 70% music and 30% talk. 75% of music is local and the other 25% is music from across Africa and around the world.

The station is owned by AB Communications, which also owns two regional commercial radio stations, 98.4 Midlands in Gweru and Hevoi FM in Masvingo. The AB Communications Group is headed by its founder Supa MANDIWANZIRA and Managing Director Vongai Muzenda. The Station Manager for ZiFM Stereo is Danis Dube, also known as "Danny that Guy".
