= Maurice Nyagumbo =

Zimbabwean politician (1924–1989)

- Born: Tapfumaneyi Maurice Nyagumbo; 12 December 1924; Makoni, near Rusape, Southern Rhodesia
- Died: 20 April 1989 (aged 64)
- Occupation: Politician
- Known for: politics
- Notable work: With the People: An Autobiography From the Zimbabwe Struggle (1979)

Tapfumaneyi Maurice Nyagumbo (12 December 1924 – 20 April 1989) was a Zimbabwean politician, who spent almost two decades in prison as a consequence of his political activities.

== Life and career ==
Nyagumbo was born in 1924, in Makoni, near Rusape, Southern Rhodesia, into a family of four boys and three girls, and had his primary education at St Faith Anglican Mission and St Augustine's Penhalonga. In the 1940s he travelled in search of employment to South Africa, where he was introduced to the South African Communist Party, and was a member until its banning in 1948.

His political associates at various times included James Chikerema and Joshua Nkomo. In 1955 Nyagumbo became a founding member of the Zimbabwe Youth League. In 1959 he joined the Zimbabwe African National Congress and later that year he was detained. He spent most of the subsequent two decades in prison in Rhodesia, until his release on 12 December 1979. During his time in detention he wrote a book, With the People: An Autobiography From the Zimbabwe Struggle, which was published soon after independence (Allison & Busby, 1979).

Nyagumbo was elected to the House of Assembly in 1980. He was a ZANU (the Zimbabwe African National Union) representative in the 1985 talks to merge ZANU and Nkomo's ZAPU. Nyagumbo was later appointed Minister of Mines, and then was Minister of Political Affairs until 1988, when he became Senior Minister of State for Political Affairs. He resigned from his ministerial post and his post as administrative secretary of the governing party on 13 April 1989, in the wake of a report investigating corruption involving the sale of vehicles on the black market by Willowvale Motor Industries.

Nyagumbo was implicated in a 1989 scandal involving illegal car sales by government officials and members of parliament, dubbed Willowgate (referencing the Willowvale car assembly plant), and in April 1989, aged 64, he committed suicide by drinking rat poison, ashamed that he had betrayed the trust of the people he had fought so hard to liberate.
