= List of radio stations in Africa =

Radio stations in African countries can be categorized into three main areas: public, commercial, and community. The management of these radio stations is subject to each region's preferred methods.

== Algeria ==
Entreprise nationale de Radiodiffusion sonore (ENRS) is the state public radio broadcaster of Algeria, which owns:

- Alger Chaîne 1 (Arabic)
- Alger Chaîne 2 (Berber)
- Alger Chaîne 3 (French)
- Radio Algérie Internationale
- Radio Bahdja
- Radio Culture
- Radio Coran
- Jil FM
- 46 additional local stations

== Angola ==
Rádio Nacional de Angola (RNA) is the state radio broadcaster of Angola, which owns:

- Canal A
- Rádio Luanda
- FM Estéreo
- N'Gola Yetu
- Rádio 5

Private/Other

- 234Radio
- Ecclesia FM - 97.5 FM Luanda (Religious Radio Station)
- Luanda Antena Comercial - 95.5 FM Luanda
- Ngola Radio - 87.7 FM Luanda

== Ascension Island ==
The Atlantic Relay Station is the official broadcasting station of Ascension Island, installed in 1966.

- AFN Ascension
- BBC World Service
- BFBS Radio
- Saint FM Community Radio

== Benin ==
Office de Radiodiffusion et Télévision du Bénin (ORTB) is the state broadcaster of Benin, which owns:

- Radio Bénin (National)
- Radio Régionale
- Atlantic FM
- Radio Parakou

Private/Other

- BBC WS Africa
- CAPP FM
- FM Ouémé
- Radio Adja Ouèrè
- Radio Maranatha
- Radio Tokpa
- RFI Afrique
- RIC (Radio Immaculée Conception)
- Golfe FM
- Océan FM
- Soleil FM
- Frissons Radio
- Fraternité FM

== Botswana ==
- Duma FM
- Gabz FM
- Radio Botswana | Radio Botswana 1 & Radio Botswana 2 (FM 103)
- Yarona FM 106.6

== Burkina Faso ==
Radio Television du Burkina (RTB), is the state broadcaster of Burkina Faso, which owns:

- RTB Radio (National radio station)
- Radio Canal Arc-en-Ciel
- Local RTB radio stations

Private/Other

- BBC WS Africa
- Horizon FM
- Ouaga FM
- RFI Afrique
- Radio Gambidi
- Radio La Voix des Lacs
- Radio Maria
- Radio Munyu
- Radio Pulsar
- Radio Salankoloto
- Savane FM
- VOA Africa
- Hit Radio Burkina

== Burundi ==
Radio Télévision Nationale du Burundi (RTNB) is the state broadcaster of Burundi, which owns:

- RTNB Radio 1
- RTNB Radio 2

Private/Other

- BBC World Service Africa
- Bonesha FM
- CCIB FM
- Radio Isanganiro
- Radio Maria
- Radio Rema FM
- Radio Scolaire Nderagakura
- Renaissance FM
- RFI Afrique
- RPA
- Radio Umwizero
- Hit Radio Burundi (Official website)

== Cameroon ==
Cameroon Radio & Television (CRTV) is the state broadcaster of Cameroon, which owns:

- CRTV Radio Nationale

Private/Other

- 234Radio
- Abakwa FM
- BBC WS Africa
- RBN
- RFI Afrique
- Sweet FM
- Stone FM community Radio Ndop
- Magic FM
- RSI
- Balafon FM
- Equinoxe FM
- CRTV radio

== Cape Verde ==
Rádio e Televisão de Cabo Verde (RTC) is the state broadcaster of Cape Verde, which owns:

- RCV Rádio de Cabo Verde (National)
- RCV Mais
- RCV Regional

Private/Other

- Emissora Cristão Rádio Nova
- Rádio Barlavento
- Rádio Clube do Mindelo
- Radio Crioula FM
- Rádio Educativa
- Rádio Rural Santo Antão
- RDP África
- RFI Afrique

== Central African Republic ==
Radio Centrafrique is the state broadcaster of Central African Republic.

- BBC WS Africa
- Radio Centrafrique (National)
- Radio Maria
- Radio Ndeke Luka
- Radio Siriri
- Radio Zereda
- RFI Afrique
- VOA Africa
- Hit Radio RCA

== Chad ==
- Radiodiffusion Nationale Tchadienne or RNT, is the state broadcaster of Chad.
- BBC WS Africa
- DJA FM - N'Djamena
- RFI Afrique

== Comoros ==
Office de Radio et Télévision des Comores (ORTC) is the state broadcaster of Comoros, which owns:

- Radio Comores

Private/Other

- RFI Afrique
- Tropic FM
- Star FM
- Sud Radio

== Congo ==
La Radiodiffusion Télévision Congolaise (RTC) is the state broadcaster of the Republic of the Congo, which owns:

- RTC National
- RTC Régional

Private/Other

- Africa No. 1
- RFI Afrique
- Hit Radio Congo

== Democratic Republic of Congo ==
Radio-Télévision nationale congolaise or RTNC, is the state broadcaster of the Democratic Republic of Congo, which owns:

- RTNC Chaîne Nationale

Private/Other

- BBC WS Africa
- Digital Congo FM
- Kasaï Horizons
- Radio Liberté
- Radio Okapi
- Radio Sango Malamu
- Raga FM
- RFI Afrique
- RTBF International

== Djibouti ==
Radio Télévision de Djibouti (RTD) is the state broadcaster of the Republic of Djibouti, which owns:

- Radio Inter
- Radio Nationale
- RTD FM

Private/Other

- BBC Somali Service
- Monte Carlo Doualiya
- RFI Afrique
- VOA Somali

== Egypt ==
Egyptian Radio and Television Union (ERTU) is the state broadcaster of Egypt. The United Media Services, owns privately owned radio stations in addition to several private stations across the country.

== Equatorial Guinea ==
Radiotelevisión de Guinea Ecuatorial (RTVGE) is the state broadcaster of Equatorial Guinea, which owns:

- Radio Nacional Guinea Ecuatorial

Private/Other

- Africa No.1
- BBC WS Africa
- RFI Afrique
- Asonga Radio

== Eritrea ==
- Radio Selamna
- Dimtsi Hafash
- Radio Bana
- Radio Zara

== Ethiopia ==
- Afro FM 105.3
- Arada FM 95.1
- Bisrat FM 101.1
- Debub FM
- EBC FM 104.7
- FM Addis 97.1
- Radio Ethiopia 93.1
- Fana FM 98.1
- J FM
- KETO 93.9 FM Denver
- Sheger FM 102.1
- zami 90.1 FM
- Harar FM 101.4
- 103.7 FM
- Finfinnee 92.3 FM
- Shamanne 107.2 Fm
- Ciro 101.1 FM
- 105.3
- Ethio FM
- Ahadu FM

== Gabon ==
Radiodiffusion-Télévision Gabonaise (RTG) is the state broadcaster of Gabon, which owns:

- RTG Châine 1
- RTG Châine 2

Private/Other

- BBC WS Africa
- Radio Sainte-Marie
- RFI Afrique
- Hit Radio Gabon

== Ghana ==
Ghana Broadcasting Corporation (GBC) is the state broadcaster of Ghana, which owns:

- 234Radio
- Peny Radio
- Radio 1
- Radio 2
- Uniiq FM
- Volta Star
- Starr 103.5FM
- Twin City Radio
- Radio Central
- Radio Savannah
- Garden City Radio
- URA Radio
- Radio Upper West
- Sunrise FM
- Obonu FM
- Radio BAR

Private o international radio:

- Atlantis Radio
- BBC WS Africa
- Choice FM
- Metro FM
- RFI Afrique
- Sky FM

== Guinea ==
Radio Télévision Guinéenne (RTG) is the state broadcaster of Guinea, which owns:

- Radio Nationale Guinéenne
- Radio Rurale Guinéene

Private/Other

- BBC WS Africa
- Chérie FM
- Djoliba FM
- Espace FM
- Évasion FM
- Horizon FM
- Milo FM
- Nostalgie Guinée
- Radio Liberté
- RFI Afrique
- Voix de l'Afrique

== Guinea-Bissau ==
Guinea-Bissau National Radio (RGB) is the state broadcaster of Guinea-Bissau, which owns:

- Radiodiffusão Nacional do Guinea
- including Several local radio stations

Private/Other

- RDP África
- RFI Afrique

== Ivory Coast ==
Radiodiffusion-Télévision Ivoirienne (RTI) is the state broadcaster of Ivory Coast, which owns:

- Radio Côte d'Ivoire
- Fréquence 2

Private/Other

- BBC WS Africa
- Onuci FM
- Radio Jam
- RFI Afrique
- VOA Africa
- Vibe Radio
- Trace FM

== Kenya ==
Broadcasting in Swahili, English and other local dialects, Kenya Broadcasting Corporation (KBC) is the state broadcaster of Kenya, which owns:

- KBC Radio Taifa
- KBC English Service
- KBC Eastern
- Coro FM
- Pwani FM

Private/Other

- 234Radio
- BBC WS Africa
- Biblia Husema Radio
- Capital FM
- Spice FM owned by The Standard Media Group PLC
- Vybez FM
- Chamgee FM
- Coro FM
- CRI Nairobi 91.9 FM (China Radio International)
- Classic 105 FM
- East FM
- Easy FM
- EATN Radio
- Emoo FM
- Family Radio
- Imani Radio
- Hope FM
- Hot96
- Inooro FM
- Kameme FM
- Kass FM
- Kiss 100 FM
- Milele FM
- Musyii FM
- Mulembe FM
- Radio Italia Africa
- Radio Maisha (broadcasts in Swahili)
- Radio Waumini
- Ramogi FM
- RFI Afrique
- RHI
- Sayare Radio
- SIFA
- Sirwo Radio
- Sound Asia Radio
- Taach FM
- West FM
- Upendo FM
- VOA America
- Kenya Radio Stations Online
- Kenya FM Radio Online

== Lesotho ==
- MXXL Radio 91.0 MHz

romanza TV Africa

== Liberia ==
Liberia Broadcasting System or LBS, is the state broadcaster of Liberia, which owns:

- Radio Liberia

Private/Other

- 234Radio
- BBC WS Africa
- Magic 99.2 FM
- Buffalo VOA 94.1 FM
- Love FM
- RFI Afrique
- Sky FM
- STAR radio
- UNMIL Radio
- Hott FM 107.9

== Libya ==
Libyan Radio and Television (LRT) is the state broadcaster of Libya.

Private/Other

- Al Aan FM (transmits in 105.3 MHz across the country, covering cities: Al Bayda, Al Marj, Benghazi, Jadu, Misrata, Labraq, Nalut, Sabha, Sirte, Susah, Tobruk, Tripoli).
- Radio Libya
- Al-Shababiyah
- Al-Itha'ah al-Wataniya
- BBC World Service
- BBC WS Arabic
- Libya FM
- Monte Carlo Doualiya
- Tribute FM
- Voice of Free Libya

== Madagascar ==
- Radio Nationale Malagasy is the state broadcaster of Madagascar.
- Hopefy Radio MG
- Radio Oasis 106.4 FM
- Radio Don Bosco or RDB
- Radio Antsiva
- Radio Television Analamanga or RTA
  - Radio Analamanga
- Alliance FM
- BBC WS Africa
- Fréquence Plus
- RFI Afrique
- RFI Musique
- Top Radio
- VOA Africa
- Radio Lazan'Iarivo or RLI

== Malawi ==
Malawi Broadcasting Corporation or (MBC) is the state broadcaster of Malawi, which owns:

- Radio 1
- Radio 2

Private/Other

- BBC WS Africa
- Capital 102.5 FM - Nationwide
- Joy Radio
- MIJ Radio
- Power 101 FM
- Radio Islam
- Sawati F.M
- Radio Maria
- Star FM
- TWR Africa - Nationwide
- ZBS
- Times radio
- Maziko radio
- Yoneco fm

== Mali ==
Office de Radiodiffusion Television du Mali (ORTM) is the state broadcaster of Mali, which owns:

- Radio Mali
- Chaîne 2
- Radio Rurale

Private/Other

- Aadar FM
- BBC WS Africa
- Jamakan Radio
- Radio Jamana
- RFI Afrique

== Mauritania ==
Radio Mauritanie is the state broadcaster of Mauritania, which owns:

- Radio Mauritanie National
- Radio Mauritanie Régional

Private/Other

- BBC WS Africa
- Holy Qur'an Program
- Monte Carlo Doualiya
- RFI Afrique

== Mauritius ==
Private/Other

- Faith Radio Archived 2020-01-16 at the Wayback Machine

== Mayotte ==
- Mayotte 1ère (A public radio/television broadcaster owned by France Télévisions for the overseas department of Mayotte.)
- France Inter
- Musique Info Mayotte (MIM)
- Radio Lagon
- Radio Culturelle Mahoraise (RCM)
- Virgin Radio

== Morocco ==
Société Nationale de Radiodiffusion et de Télévision or SNRT is the state broadcaster of Morocco, which owns:

- Chaîne Nationale
- Chaîne Inter
- SNRT Quran
- SNRT Arabic

Private/Other

- Atlantic Radio
- Cap Radio
- Casa FM
- Chada FM
- Hit Radio
- Luxe Radio
- Médi 1
- Médina FM
- MED Radio
- MFM
- Radio 2M

== Mozambique ==
Rádio Moçambique is the state broadcaster of Mozambique, which owns:

- Antena Nacional

Private/Other

- 99FM
- BBC WS Africa
- LM Radio
- Radio Índico
- Radio Maria
- RDP África
- RFI Português (África)

== Namibia ==
Namibian Broadcasting Corporation (NBC) is the state broadcaster of Namibia, which owns:

- NBC National Radio 1 (English)
- NBC National Radio 2 (Afrikaans)
- NBC National Radio 3 (German)
- including Other radio stations of NBC operate in several local languages

Private/Other

- 99FM Namibia: first and largest commercial English radio station in Namibia, broadcasting in main urban areas as well as by a live stream on www.99fm.com.na or the 99FM App (Android & Apple).
- 234Radio
- Hitradio Namibia: first commercial German-language radio station in Namibia, broadcasting in the central and coastal areas as well as by a live stream.
- Channel 7: Broadcasting on 104.5 FM in Windhoek. Christian community station. The widest reach (number of transmitters throughout the country) of any Namibian radio station (except Namibian Broadcasting Corporation).
- Katutura Community Radio: Broadcasts on 106.2 FM in Windhoek. A community radio station based in a Windhoek suburb - Katutura.
- Kudu FM
- Omulunga Radio
- 99FM: English medium, commercial radio station. ([www.99fm.com.na Official website])
- Radio Energy 100FM
- RFI Afrique: Broadcasting on 107.9 FM in Windhoek. Relay of French-speaking radio channel in Windhoek
- UNAM Radio: Community Radio broadcast from University of Namibia on 97.4 FM only within the city of Windhoek and surrounding areas
- West Coast FM: Broadcasting on 107.7 FM in Swakopmund and 106.9 FM in Walvis Bay. The only station in the Erongo Region broadcasting live, 24/7 from Swakopmund. Self-described as "Adult contemporary with a touch of local."

== Niger ==
Office de Radiodiffusion-Télévision du Niger or ORTN, is the state broadcaster of Niger, which owns:

- Voix du Sahel

Private/Other

- Anfani FM
- BBC WS Africa
- RFI Afrique
- Saraounia FM

== Nigeria ==
- 234Radio
- Don Bosco Radio (Official website) internet radio; transmitting from Nigeria, Ireland, Ghana etc. It is operated by youth for youth.
- Radio Biafra (Internet Radio), transmitting from London, UK and owned by the Indigenous People Of Biafra (IPOB) with its director as Mazi Nnamdi Kanu. It's a pro Biafran radio that broadcasts every two days, mostly by 7pm (GMT+1) and has its reach within Eastern Nigeria and Lagos.
- Trybe City Radio (Official website) - online campus station
- XMRadio1 (Official website) (New music, digital audio contents and new age radio shows)

== Réunion ==
- Réunion 1ère (Is the public radio/television broadcaster owned by France Télévisions for the overseas department of Réunion)

Radio France is the state broadcaster of France, which also broadcasts some stations in La Réunion and Mayotte. It owns:

- France Inter
- France Musique
- France Culture

Private/Other

- 100% Jazz
- Chérie FM
- Exo FM
- First La Réunion
- Fun Radio
- HitFM
- KOI (Kanal Océan Indien)
- Kréol FM
- Nostalgie
- Radio 102 FM
- Radio Arc-En-Ciel
- Radio Est Réunion
- Radio Festival
- Radio Free
- RSL (Radio Rivière Saint Louis)
- Radio Sky
- Radio Sud
- RIL FM - Radio Des Îles
- RZFM
- Top FM

== Rwanda ==
Rwandan Office of Information (ORINFOR) is the state broadcaster of Rwanda, which owns:

- Radio Rwanda

Private/other

- BBC WS Africa
- Choice FM
- City Radio
- Contact FM
- Deutsche Welle
- Fine FM
- Flash FM
- huguka FM
- Inkoramutima FM
- isango star
- K FM
- Kiss FM
- Musekeweya
- Radio 10 FM
- Radio Flash FM
- Radio Maria
- Radio Umucyo
- RFI Afrique
- VOA-Kigali FM
- Voice of Africa

== Saint Helena ==
- Saint fm community radio (Broadcasts 24/7 and is available on the Internet)
- SAMS Radio (South Atlantic Media Services) (SAMS Radio 1 Broadcasts 24/7 in Saint Helena and is available on the Internet Official website and SAMS Radio 2 The second radio channel that carries BBC World Service, 24/7)

== São Tomé and Príncipe ==
- Radio Nacional São Tomé is the state's public radio broadcaster.
- Maná Radio
- RDP África
- RFI Afrique
- VOA Africa

== Senegal ==
Radiodiffusion Télévision Sénégalaise (RTS) is the state broadcaster of Senegal, which owns:

- RTS Chaîne Nationale
- RTS Chaîne Regionale
- Radio Sénégal International
- Dakar FM
- Mag FM

Private/Other

- BBC WS Africa
- Dunyaa FM
- Express FM
- Nostalgie
- Océan FM
- RFI Afrique
- Radio Future Médias (RFM)
- Sénégal Info
- Sud FM
- Wal Fadjri FM
- West Africa Democracy Radio
- Hit Radio Senegal

== Seychelles ==
- BBC WS Africa
- Paradise FM
- Radyo Sesel
- Pure FM
- RFI Afrique

== Sierra Leone ==
- 234Radio
- Capital Radio - Freetown, Sierra Leone
- Radio France International - 89.9 FM Freetown
- Radio Maria
- Sky FM
- SLBC FM

== Somalia ==
- Radio Muqdisho, the state government-run radio station of Somalia.
- BBC Somali Service
- Somali National Army Radio (SNA Radio) - 90.7 FM in Muqdisho, www.snaradio.net
- BBC WS Arabic
- Gool FM
- Puntland TV and Radio
- Radio Kulmiye KNN
- Horseed Radio
- One Nation Radio
- Radio Bar-Kulan
- Radio Banadir
- Radio Daljir
- Radio Dalsan
- Radio Daldoon
- Radio Gaalkacyo
- Radio Garowe
- Radio Kulmiye
- Radio Maandeeq, FM frequency, independent private radio in Gedo region on Juba Valley.
- Radio Maanta
- Radio Markableey, independent FM radio in Bardera, Gedo
- Radio Somaliland
- Radio Xamar/Voice of Democracy
- Radio Xurmo
- Radio Shabelle
- Radio STN
- SBC Radio
- VOA Somali

== South Africa ==
- All Jazz Radio (Africa's only 24/7 volunteer driven online radio station streaming daily from Cape Town, playing all jazz from Africa including, Blues, Latin & World jazz)
- 234Radio
- East Coast Radio
- Soweto iRadio
- Ugu Youth Radio
- 70vibe-fm - It's about the seventies music!
- Ntuzuma Fm (Online Radio)

== South Sudan ==
South Sudan Broadcasting Corporation is the state broadcaster of South Sudan which owns:

- South Sudan Radio

Private/Other

- BBC WS Africa
- BBC WS Arabic
- Bakhita Radio (Juba)
- Emmanuel Radio (Torit)
- Easter Radio (Yei)
- Voice of Hope (Wau)
- Anisa Radio (Yambio)
- Good News (Rumbek)
- Sout al Mahaba (Malakal)
- Radio Don Bosco (Torit)
- Miraya FM
- City FM (Juba)
- Monte Carlo Doualiya
- RFI Afrique

== Sudan ==
Sudan National Broadcasting Corporation is the state broadcaster of Sudan which owns:

- Sudan National Radio
- FM 100
- Salam Radio
- Quran Radio
- Wadi Nile Valley Radio

Private/Other

- Capital Radio 91.6 FM
- Miraya FM
- Radio Dabanga
- SRTC Sudan Radio
- Voice of Peace

== Swaziland ==
Swaziland Broadcasting and Information Services or SBIS, is the state broadcaster of Swaziland, which owns:

- Radio 1 (Siswati)
- Radio 2 (English)

Private/Other

- One FM
- TWR Africa

== Tanzania ==
Tanzania Broadcasting Corporation (TBC) owns:

- TBC FM
- TBC Taifa

Private/Other

- 234Radio
- Abood Radio
- Bongo Radio (Online Radio Station)
- Clouds FM
- Country FM
- East Africa Radio
- Ebony FM
- HHC Alive Radio (Christian Radio)
- Info Radio
- Kwa Neema FM
- Radio Kwizera FM-Covering Kagera, Kigoma, Geita, Shinyanga, Mwanza, Simiyu, Mara regions in North-Western Tanzania and the Great Lakes regions of Africa
- Living Water FM
- Magic FM
- Mambo Jambo FM
- Mbeya Highlands FM
- Praise Power FM
- Pride FM Radio
- Radio Free Africa
- Radio Imaan (Islamic Radio)
- Radio Maria
- Radio One
- Radio Safina (Christian Radio)
- Times FM
- WAPO Rado

== Tristan da Cunha ==
- Atlantic FM
- BFBS Radio
- Saint FM
- Tristan Radio

== Togo ==
- BBC World Service Africa
- Canal Educatif Francophone
- Radio Jesus Vous Aime JVA
- Radio Maria Togo
- RDT Radio
- RFI Afrique
- Zephyr FM
- Hit Radio Togo

== Tunisia ==
Since 2007, Établissement de la Radio Tunisienne (ERT) is the state broadcaster of Tunisia, which operates:

- Radio Nationale
- Radio Tunisie Culture
- Radio Jeunes
- Radio Tunis Chaîne Internationale (RTCI)
- Radio Zitouna (confiscated in 2011; state-managed)
- Regional and local stations:
  - Radio Monastir
  - Radio Le Kef
  - Radio Sfax
  - Radio Gafsa
  - Radio Tataouine
  - Radio Panorama
  - Radio Kasserine

Private and associative

- Cap FM
- Diwan FM
- Express FM
- Jawhara FM
- KnOOz FM
- Misk FM (associative)
- Mosaïque FM
- Oxygène FM
- Radio Campus Tunis (associative)
- Radio IFM
- Radio Med
- Sabra FM
- Shems FM (confiscated; defunct)
- Ulysse FM

== Uganda ==
Uganda Broadcasting Corporation (UBC) is the state radio broadcaster of Uganda, which owns:

- UBC Radio Uganda (National)
- Red Channel
- Blue Channel
- Star FM
- Magic 100
- Mega FM

Private/Other

- 234Radio
- Love Radio
- Bana U Radio
- Basoga Baino FM 87.7
- BBC WS Africa
- Beat FM 96.3
- CBS FM Buganda
- 91.3 Capital FM
- Hot 100 Uganda
- Impact FM
- Jubilee Radio 105.6 Fort Portal
- K-FM (93.3)
- FUFA FM 102.3 Kampala
- Kaaro FM 103.8 Lyantonde
- Mega FM Gulu 102
- Namirembe FM 93.9
- NBS FM 89.4 Jinja
- Pearl FM 107.9
- Power FM 104.1
- Radio Maria
- Radio One FM
- Radio5 99.7 FM
- Radio ABC
- Radio City FM
- Radio Sapientia 94.4 FM
- Radio Wa 89.8 FM Lira
- RFI Afrique
- Sanyu FM
- Spirit FM 96.6
- Touch FM 95.9
- Tropical Radio 88.4 FM
- Vision Radio 89.1
- 94.8 XFM
- Radio West 100.2
- Radio Rukungiri
- Radio Ankole
- Voice of Tooro
- Kinkiizi Radio
- Crooze Fm
- Radio Endigyito
- Hunter Fm
- Voice of Kigezi
- 100.2 Pakwach Fm
- RFM Radio - 91.1 Iganga
- Galaxy FM 100.2

== Western Sahara ==
Moroccan radio stations can be received in the Moroccan-controlled parts of Western Sahara, which include the Moroccan state broadcaster SNRT and its radio channels:

- SNRT Al Idaâ Al-Watania (National)
- SNRT Al Idaâ Al Amazighia
- SNRT Quran
- Chaîne Inter

Private/Other (Moroccan)

- Aswat Radio
- Chada FM
- Hit Radio
- Médi 1
- MED Radio
- MFM Sahara
- Radio 2M

Radio Nacional de la R.A.S.D. is the Sahrawi-controlled state broadcaster and is based in the Tindouf refugee camps in Algeria.

== Zambia ==
The following are the registered radio stations in Zambia. The categories of radio stations include public, commercial and community.

- 234Radio
- ZNBC (Zambia National Broadcasting Corporation)
  - ZNBC Radio 1
  - ZNBC Radio 2
  - ZNBC Radio 4
- 5FM Radio Zambia
- AMA Radio 93.3 FM
- Bangwela Radio - Samfya
- BBC World Service Africa
- Beats FM Radio - Solwezi
- Breeze FM - 89.3 FM Chipata, 89.7 FM Lundazi, 98.9 FM Katete
- Byta FM Radio
- Capital FM 99.7 - Lusaka
- Cheke Radio - Kaoma
- Chikankata Radio - Chikankata
- Chikaya Radio - Lundazi
- Chikuni Radio - Monze
- Choma Maanu FM Radio - Choma
- Chongwe Radio - Chongwe
- Christian Voice Radio - Lusaka
- Classic Woods radio - Lusaka
- Cloud FM - Kabwe
- Comet 93.7 Fm
- Faith Radio - Kitwe
- Falls FM Radio - Livingstone
- Flava FM - 87.7 FM - Kitwe
- Feel Free Radio
- Hone FM - Lusaka
- Hot FM 87.7 FM Lusaka
- Iso FM Radio - Isoka
- Ithezhi-tezhi Radio - Lusaka
- Iwave FM Radio - Chingola
- Jive FM Radio - Ndola
- Joy FM Zambia 106.9
- K FM Radio - Mansa
- Kabangabanga Radio - Solwezi
- Kafue Radio - Kafue
- Kariba Radio - Siavonga
- Kasempa Radio - Kasempa
- KNC Radio - Kabwe
- Kokoliko FM - 94.9 FM - Chingola
- Komboni Radio 94.9 FM
- Kwenje Radio - Chama
- Liseli Radio - Mongu
- Live FM Radio - Lusaka
- Luapula Radio - Nchelenge
- Lubuto Radio - Kaputa
- Lukulu Radio - Lukulu
- Luswepo Radio - Mbala
- Lutanda Radio - Kasama
- Lyambai Radio - Mongu
- Mano Radio - 89.1 FM Kasama
- Maranatha Radio - Kabwe
- Mazabuka Community Radio MAZ FM - 100.9FM - Mazabuka
- Metro FM - 94.5 Midlands
- Millennium Radio
- Mkushi Radio - Mkushi
- Mphangwe Radio - Katete
- Mpika Radio - Mpika
- Muchinga FM Radio - Chinsali
- Mumbwa Blue Sky FM Radio
- Mungu FM Radio - Mongu
- Musi-O-Tunya Radio - Livingstone
- Mwinilunga Radio - Mwinilunga
- Namwianga Radio - Kalomo
- New Generation Radio - Solwezi
- One Love Radio - Lusaka
- Pan African Radio
- Parliament Radio
- Pasme Radio - Petauke
- Petauke Explorers
- Power FM Radio - Lusaka
- Radio Chikuni 91.9 FM
- Radio Chimwemwe - Ndola
- Radio France International - 100.5 FM Lusaka & 92.5 FM Kitwe
- Radio Icengelo 89.1 FM - Kitwe
- Radio Maria - 88.5 FM Chipata & 94.5 FM Nyimba District
- Radio Maria Yatsani Voice - Lusaka
- Radio Phoenix 89.5 FM - Lusaka (100.5 FM - Kitwe)
- Radio Q-FM-Zambia
- Rise FM Radio - Chingola
- Rock FM Radio
- Roots FM Radio
- Serenje Radio - Serenje
- Sky FM Radio
- Solwezi FCC Radio - Solwezi
- Sun FM Zambia 88.5 Ndola City
- Tuta FM Radio - Mansa
- United Voice Radio - Lusaka
- UNZA Radio - Lusaka
- Valley FM radio - Nyimba
- Vision Macha
- Voice of Kalomo - Kalomo
- Walamo Radio - Mpulungu
- Yangeni radio - Mansa
- Young Generation Radio
- Your Anthem Radio "YAR" FM Radio - Kitwe
- Zambezi FM 94.1 ( Livingstone, Kazungula, Zimba and parts of Kalomo, including the added parts into Zimbabwe hinterlands, Botswana and Namibia making it the only Zambian commercial radio station that broadcasting in Namibia)
- The Word Station - Lusaka (Coming soon)

== Zimbabwe ==
ZBC is the state broadcaster of Zimbabwe and operates six radio networks.

State Owned Radio

- Classic 263
- Radio Zimbabwe
- Power FM
- National FM
- Khulumani FM
- 95.8 Central Radio

Privately Owned Commercial Radio

- Star FM
- ZiFM Stereo
- Skyz Metro FM
- Capitalk 100.4 FM
- 98.4 Midlands
- Breeze FM
- Hevoi FM
- YAFM
- Diamond FM
- Nyaminyami FM

Community Radio

- Ntepe-Manama Radio
- Lyeja FM
- Ingqanga FM
- Radio Bukalanga
- Bayethe FM
- Lotsha FM
- Twasumbuka FM
- Kasambabezi FM
- Nyangani FM
- Avuxeni FM
- Chimanimani FM
- Vemuganga FM
- Ndau FM
- Madziwa FM

Campus Radio

- nust.fm
- LSU Radio
- MSU Campus Radio
- GZU Campus Radio
- PaChikomo FM
- H-Poly FM
- CUT FM

Internet/Webcast only

- Heart and Soul Broadcasting
- Nehanda Radio
- Zim Net Radio
- Zim Net Radio Gospel
- Praise 105.2 Radio
- YP Radio
- Radio VOP
- Shaya FM
- Remnant Tunes
- Pamtengo Radio
- Radio54 African Panorama
- AfroZim Radio
- After5Radio
- SW Radio Africa
- UFO Trap Station

== See also ==
- Media of Africa
- Lists of newspapers in Africa
- List of television stations in Africa
- Internet in Africa
- Radio in other continents:
  - Lists of radio stations in the Americas
  - Lists of radio stations in Asia
  - Lists of radio stations in Europe
  - Lists of radio stations in Oceania
