= Rumbidzai Takawira =

Zimbabwean media personality (born 1990)

- Born: January 11, 1990 (age 36); Harare, Zimbabwe
- Occupations: Journalist, news anchor,
- Employer: The Conservation Conversation Conservation 2022 - Present

Rumbidzai Takawira is a prominent Zimbabwean television personality, TV producer, broadcast journalist and former Zimbabwe Broadcasting Corporation main news anchor. She is also a karateka, she represented Zimbabwe at the World Karate Championships in Shizuoka, Japan.

== Early life ==
Born in Harare on 11 January 1990, Rumbidzai Takawira grew up in Harare and attended her early education at Eaglesvale Primary and Secondary School. She studied journalism with CCOSA Journalism School.

== Career ==
She started her career in 2010 when she was doing announcements during COTTCO Rugby Festival now known as Dairibord Zimbabwe Rugby Festival. In August 2012, Rumbidzai then auditioned for radio news at ZBC TV and was one of the successful participants. She began her career in radio news on ZBC's Power FM Zimbabwe and SpotFM (now Classic 263). She was Sub-Editor for news and current affairs at PowerFM and Classic 263 from October 2012 until 2017 then from 2017 to 2018 she was also the Producer/Presenter for the Actualities bulletins.

In July 2013, Rumbidzai Takawira started anchoring an early morning news bulletin on ZBC TV called Good Morning Zimbabwe and from May 2014 to February 2020 she became the leading anchor on the prime time News Hour bulletin (now the Main News) at 8 pm. As her popularity grew, she was given the name "News Bae" by viewers through social media. She was appointed ZBC TV acting Diplomatic Correspondent from July 2019 – May 2020.

Rumbidzai Takawira is an entrepreneur and a brand ambassador. In 2018 Rumbidzai was appointed Anti-Poaching brand ambassador for WildAid and The Zimbabwe Parks and Wildlife Management Authority along with Danai Gurira, Jah Prayzah and Selmor Mtukudzi

June 2020, she was appointed Judicial Service Commission of Zimbabwe Head of Communications, Corporate Affairs and Spokesperson. Rumbidzai is the Director of MedEsther Brands PR Consultancy, a public relations and corporate communications company.

In 2021, Takawira was an actress in a documentary about Rhino anti-poaching titled Behind the Horn directed by Nigel Lozane and written by Imire Wildlife Conservation.

Takawira is the Founder and Executive Director of "The Conservation Conversation", one of Zimbabwe's leading platforms for conservation education and advocacy. Through this initiative, she bridges the gap between science, policy and public awareness, ensuring environmental issues are both accessible and actionable. Her work spans policy engagement, media advocacy and community driven initiatives that champion sustainable development, youth empowerment, gender equality and climate resilience.

=== Notable events hosted ===
- NAMA Awards 2016
- Miss Zimbabwe Beauty Pageant 2017
- Airforce of Zimbabwe Winter Warmer Charity Ball 2017 and 2018
- Zimbabwe Music Awards 2021

== Sport ==
Rumbidzai Takawira is also a Karateka, she has a 2nd Kyu brown belt. In 2016 she was part of the Zimbabwe national team that participated at the World Karate Championships in Shizuoka, Japan. Then in 2017 she represented Zimbabwe at the Second All Africa SO-Kyokushin Full Contact Karate regional Tournament that was held in Chitungwiza.

== Awards and recognition ==
- 50 most influential young Zimbabweans under 40 in 2014 (age 24)
- Zimbabwes 'Under 40' 100 Powerful Leaders of 2016/
- CEO's Award for the Most Outstanding Performance as a TV Presenter – 2016 ZBC Awards
- RIZPAH Woman Achievement Award for The Most Inspiring Woman 2017
- Junior Chamber International (JCI) Associate Member 2020

Rumbidzai Takawira has been a member of the Board of Management of Events for The Airforce of Zimbabwe Charity Fund since 2014.
