= Mavis Moyo =

Zimbabwean broadcaster and media worker (born 1929)

- Born: Mavis Zulu; 17 July 1929 (age 96); Esigodini, Matabeleland, Zimbabwe
- Citizenship: Zimbabwean
- Occupations: Broadcaster; Media practitioner; Activist
- Years active: 1954–present
- Employer: Zimbabwe Broadcasting Corporation (ZBC)
- Organizations: Federation of African Media Women Zimbabwe (FAMWZ); Gender and Media Connect
- Known for: Development Through Radio (DTR); pioneering women’s broadcasting in Zimbabwe
- Notable work: Radio programmes including Radio Home-Craft Club; Changes
- Title: Chairperson of FAMWZ
- Children: 7

Mavis Moyo (born 17 July 1929) is a Zimbabwean broadcaster, formerly of Radio Zimbabwe (ZBC Radio 4), and a founding member in 1985 and chairperson of the Federation of African Media Women Zimbabwe (FAMWZ), now known as Gender and Media Connect. During the 1980s and 1990s, she led a project that became known as Development Through Radio (DTR), across Zimbabwe and the entire Southern Africa region.

== Early life ==
She was born as Mavis Zulu on 17 July 1929 in Esigodini ("Essexvale"), a village in Matabeleland, 43 km south-east of Bulawayo, Zimbabwe's second largest city, and grew up there. After her education and working as a teacher for about 12 years, she became involved in media work by chance in 1954 as a temporary replacement at what was then the Federal Broadcasting Corporation (FBC), and she was kept as a part-timer. Initially, this work entailed reading inserts in Ndebele for a women's program called "radio home-craft club" (RHC). Later, a vacancy arose, she applied and got the post of an announcer.

== Career ==
=== Broadcasting career ===
For many years, Moyo was one of very few women broadcasters, black or white, in colonial Zimbabwe. In 1968, she was the first woman to read the news on the Rhodesian Broadcasting Corporation (RBC) African Service. On 4 October 1982, Moyo was appointed to spearhead the establishment of ZBC's Radio 4 dedicated to education and rural development. In more than 50 years in radio, she is credited with pioneering participatory techniques of broadcasting and development through women's programmes such as RHC. She studied radio production at Radio Netherlands Training Center, and in the late 1980s produced the radio drama Changes, scripted by Ama Ata Aidoo, came third in a competition organised by the Union of Radio and Television Organizations in Africa (URTNA), and won the Prix Futura in Germany.

As a broadcaster and an African woman from rural Matabeleland herself, she recognised the power of radio as a means of communication and imparting knowledge among rural communities in Africa and especially for the women, who are often the ones running the farms and working in the rural area when men migrate to cities to find paid jobs. "I realized that [radio] was a powerful tool of communication. As a teacher, I was imparting knowledge to about forty to four hundred people in the class but with radio I could teach the whole country."

=== Work and achievements ===
Moyo has been instrumental in the formation of the Federation of African Media Women, beginning with a consultative meeting of media women in Lusaka, Zambia, in 1977, with participants from, among other countries, Kenya, Tanzania, Uganda, Zambia, and Zimbabwe. The Zimbabwe Media women launched their own national federation (FAMWZ), when in 1985, they went to the International Women's Conference in Nairobi, Kenya, with a draft of their own constitution at hand. Moyo says since then, FAMWZ's focus has been the development of media women and other women in the urban and rural areas of the country. The increased local and regional activities and networking among African media women led to FAMW-SADC being formed in 1992. In 1988, FAMWZ, with Moyo as chairperson, launched the rural radio listening club project DTR.

=== Development Through Radio ===
In an interview with radio continental drift in 2012, Moyo emphasises how what became known as DTR or Development Through Radio grew from the seed of a collaboration and exchange between urban and rural women, initially between the Jamuranai Women's Club in the Harare township of Highfield and rural women from Seke District south of Harare. This relationship between women across the urban-rural divides developed into an early participatory radio in Africa on an unprecedented scale. It is thanks to the leadership of Moyo, and her persistence and that of her colleagues at ZBC Radio 4, carried further by FAMWZ members through outreach training, as much as the eagerness of the rural women groups themselves, that radio listening clubs could be established all over the country. Support from UNESCO and the Friedrich Ebert Foundation helped to run and maintain the project, which had the backing of the Ministries of Information, Post and Telecommunications, and Community- and Cooperative Development and Women's Affairs.

A 2009 report by the Open Society Initiative, Public Broadcasting in Africa, makes mention of the project under the leadership of FAMWZ as Radio Zimbabwe's best known broadcasting initiative: "The project created radio listening clubs involving rural women who would gather to listen to programs by and about themselves. It was hoped that opinion leaders would emerge from the radio listening clubs who would then relay this development information to others."

After leaving the Zimbabwe Broadcasting Corporation, Moyo worked in support of DTR projects across the Southern African region, such as in South Africa's Kwa-Zulu Natal, Mozambique, Malawi, Namibia and Angola.

== Personal life ==
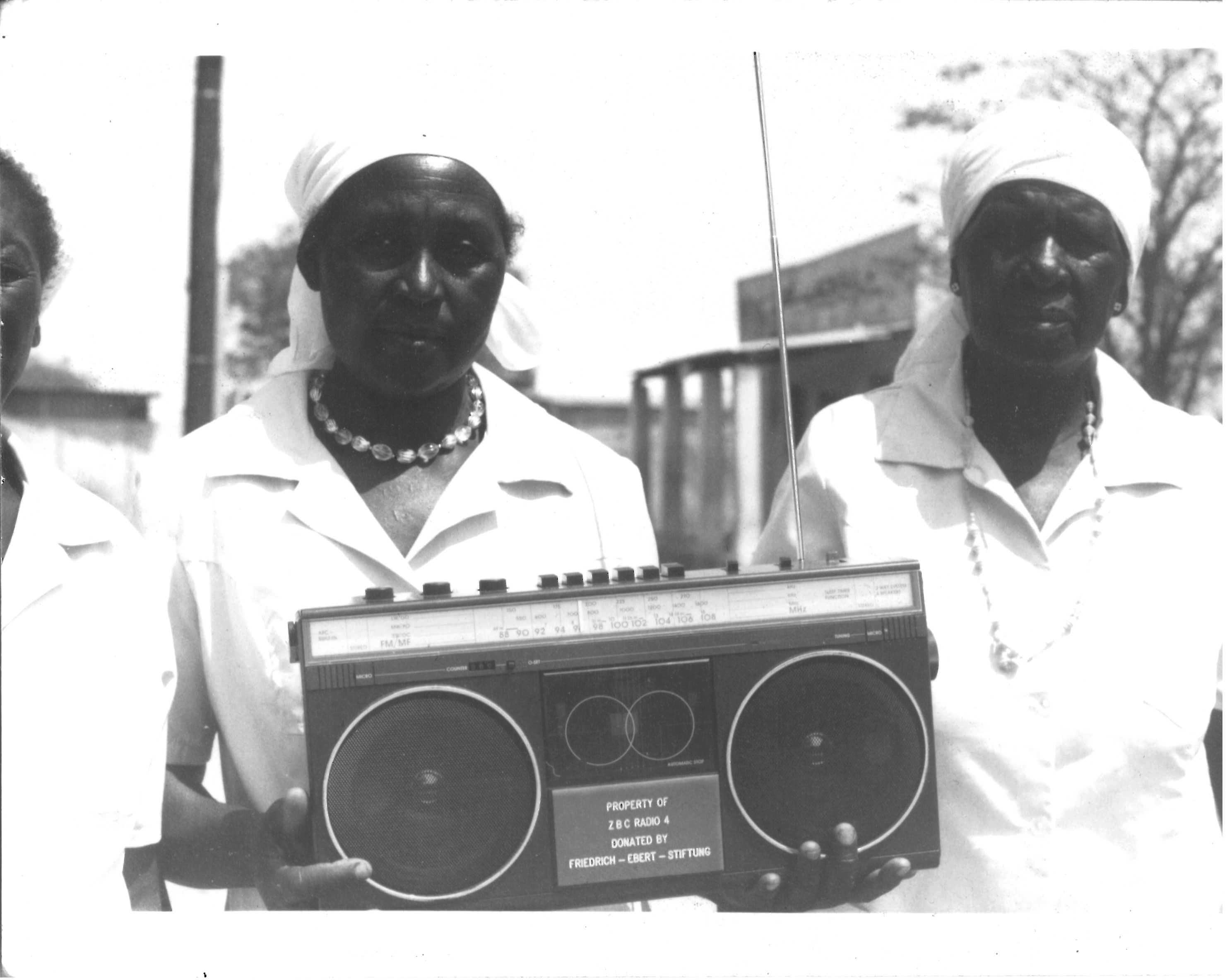
Women of the radio listening clubs in Seke, Zimbabwe, receive radios

Moyo lives in Harare and is the mother of seven children, six sons and a daughter. She is still involved in consultancy work and sits on several media boards.

== Vision and legacy ==
Throughout the 2012 interview with radio continental drift, Moyo emphasised the segregation of women coming out of a patriarchal society, their exclusion from any posts of influence, particularly from the media. In response, her life's work has been the active call for women to unite: for the media women to unite across specialisation and professions; for the women of Zimbabwe to come together across urban and rural divides; for women across Southern Africa to unite across national differences and join hands and voices for media participation of women across their continent and societies.

In the transcript of an interview with Moyo about the history of FAMWZ, published by Kubatana Network in Harare, she concludes with the statement: "We want to see media women taking their rightful places as managers in the media and establishing their own newspapers, magazines and broadcasting stations and film industries. They have the capacity to do this and also to run media training schools. There is a very strong movement of women who have a desire to tap on these fields."
