= Metro FM (disambiguation) =

Metro FM is a national radio station in South Africa.

Metro FM may also refer to:

- Metro FM (Ghana), a radio station in Kumasi, Ashanti Region
- Metro FM (Nepal), a radio station in Kathmandu
- Metro FM (Turkey), a radio station in Istanbul
