= Clare Nyakujara =

- Born: 6 October 1984 (age 41); Harare, Zimbabwe
- Genres: Jazz; World; Afrofusion
- Occupations: songwriter; musician
- Instruments: Vocals, acoustic guitar
- Years active: 2000–present

Clare Nyakujara is a US based Zimbabwean afro-fusion musician and acoustic player.

== Career ==
Born Clarybel Nakujara, Clare Nyakujara was born in Harare, Zimbabwe where she grew up. She began her career professionally as a backing vocalist for other established artist from 2002 when she started to 2009 and she also performed at Open mic events in Harare during that period. She then recorded her debut album in 2010 called Haudinei which featured songs like Haudinei and Gwenyambira that became popular on radio stations in Zimbabwe mainly Classic 263 FM formerly Spot FM and Haudinei was number one on Power FM Zimbabwe charts for four weeks. The second album titled Unleashed was launched by the Spanish Embassy of Zimbabwe in 2011 and it also had high rotation on Spot FM, Radio Zimbabwe and Power FM Zimbabwe charts then in 2017 she released a collaborative album titled Ndega Zvangu with Ruzivo group.

Clare is a performer at Disney's Animal Kingdom theme park where she is well known for playing the African harp known as the KORA and she won the Zimbabwe Music Awards Best Jazz artist category in 2015 and 2016.

In 2022, Clare Nyakujara authored a book titled Pimp your music business and also created an academic course for musicians on Udemy called Create A Brand That Sells.

== Discography ==
=== Albums ===
- Haudineyi 2010
- Unleashed 2011
- Ndodawo
- Fambaneni
- Ndega Zvangu

=== Singles ===
- Zuva 2021
- Ndodawo 2022

== Awards ==
- Best Jazz Artist of the year 2014/15 - Zimbabwe Music Awards
- Best Jazz Artist of the year 2015/16 - Zimbabwe Music Awards
- Young Businesswoman of the year 2016 - Zimbabwe Business Council
