= ZBC TV =

Television network in Zimbabwe

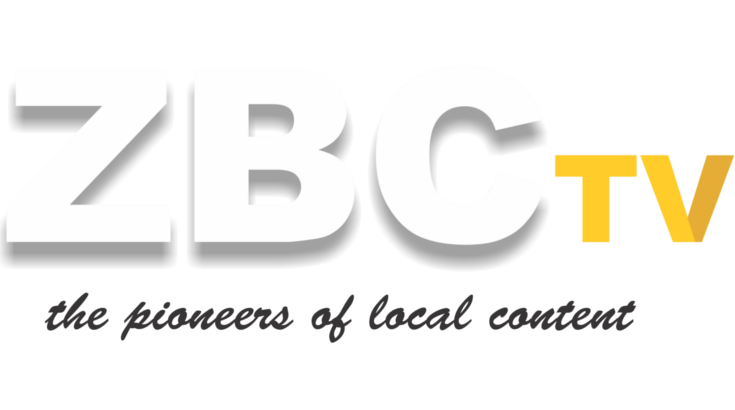
- Country: Zimbabwe
- Broadcast area: Zimbabwe
- Headquarters: Pockets Hill Studios, Highlands, Harare

Programming
- Languages: English; Ndebele; Shona
- Picture format: 16:9 576i SDTV

Ownership
- Owner: ZBC
- Sister channels: ZBC TV 2 (defunct); Channel 2 (defunct)

History
- Launched: 15 November 1960
- Replaced: Rhodesia Television (RTV)
- Former names: ZBC TV1

Links
- Website: zbc.co.zw

ZBC TV, also known as ZTV, is Zimbabwe's public free to air television network that is fully owned and operated by the state-owned Zimbabwe Broadcasting Corporation.

== History ==
In the country, television was introduced on 15 November 1960, making it the second country after Nigeria to launch such services in the Sub Saharan Africa and the first in Southern Africa. It was operated by a private company called Rhodesian Television (RTV) with its major shareholders being South African companies.

RTV was taken over by the government and became part of the then state broadcaster, Rhodesian Broadcasting Corporation (RBC) in 1976.

Television was mainly accessible in major cities of the country and mostly to the white population. At the time of launch on 15 November 1960, television became available in Salisbury (now Harare) and in June 1961 it became available in Bulawayo. Back then, the station was broadcasting in black and white until 1982, when it upgraded to full colour using PAL B system.

After the country's independence on 18 April 1980, RTV became ZBC TV and RBC became ZBC. This followed after the country changed its name from Rhodesia, Southern Rhodesia, Zimbabwe Rhodesia to Independent Zimbabwe. The station is sometimes called ZTV, an abbreviation for Zimbabwe Television, a name that was officially used in the 2000s.

In the late 90s, the country's main opposition party MDC led by Morgan Tsvangirai was launched. This saw the majority of the opposition supporters, local independent media houses, non governmental organisations and international media monitors accusing the state broadcaster for only reporting biased news favouring the ruling ZANU PF.

In February 2001, the station started airing a daily one-hour block from the African Broadcast Network, itself created by James Makawa, a Zimbabwean. This arrangement ended on 9 May upon the introduction of a new law stipulating a minimum of 75% local content.

== Other TV stations ==
ZBC started broadcasting a second television channel, TV2, available only in Harare, in 1986.

ZBC signed an agreement on 13 May 1997 to utilise the frequencies of the second channel, to Flame Lily Broadcasting, a private company, to operate Joy TV, broadcasting from 17:00 to 22:30 daily. On 22 July 1997, the channel launched. The channel took over the entirety of TV2's schedule from 1 October 1997, by leasing the frequency. The channel timeshared with LDM in the afternoons and MABC overnight and in the mornings. The station was initially carried in a 100 km radius from a single transmitter in Harare but later extended its signal to Bulawayo in May 1998 with help from a South African company.

ZBC shut down Joy TV for the first time on 4 September 1998 due to alleged payment of airtime fees. Following an intervention from Information Minister Chen Chimutengwende, its broadcasts resumed on 7 September 1998.

The channel was later closed down on 31 May 2002 when ZBC refused to renew its licence. In December 2018, ZBC announced the return of Joy TV.

In 2004, ZBC announced a new TV channel called National Television or NTV, a brainchild of the then information minister, Jonathan Moyo and was said that it will be broadcasting from Montrose Studios in Bulawayo. The launch of the station was delayed despite the fact that the transmitter was already installed. In 2005, Minister Moyo was fired and the project collapsed. In 2015 when he was reappointed as the information minister, Moyo promised to revive the NTV project but that never happened.

On 1 May 2010, ZBC reported the successful launch of another TV channel called Channel 2. The TV channel transmitted on 199.5 MHz within an 80 km (50 mile) radius of Harare. The station was later closed in 2015.

On 20 November 2020, The Broadcasting Authority of Zimbabwe (BAZ) granted free to air commercial television licences to 6 (out of the 14 applicants) private players to broadcast nationally, breaking the 60 year long ZBC TV monopoly. These include the Bulawayo-based FairTalk Communications, trading as Ke Yona TV which owns Bulawayo's Skyz Metro FM and Victoria Falls' Breeze FM. The state owned ZimPapers Limited, trading as ZTN (ZimPapers Television Network), which owns several radio stations and print media in the country was also granted. Other players include Rusununguko Media (Pvt) Ltd trading as NRTV, Jester Media trading as 3K TV, Acacia Media Group trading as Kumba TV and Channel Dzimbahwe trading as Channel D.

Unsuccessful applicants include ZiFM Stereo's parent company AB Communications trading as Flex TV, Alpha Media Holdings' Heart & Soul Broadcasting Services (Pvt) Ltd trading as HStv, Blackbury Enterprises (Pvt) Ltd trading as Blackbury TV, Conduit Investments (Pvt) Ltd trading as Conduit TV Station, Just in Time TV (Pvt) Ltd trading as JIT TV, Medianet Productions (Pvt) Ltd trading as Sunrise TV and Meditation Investments (Pvt) Ltd trading Zim news Channel.

On 27 April 2022, ZBC relaunched its second channel, this time named Jive TV. The channel was seen as a departure from the monopoly model, but was shifting towards Zanu PF-related licenses. There were also plans made by ZBC to launch five more channels.

== Programming ==
=== General entertainment and news ===
75% of the broadcast content is locally produced. International and regional content from the neighbouring South Africa, USA, UK, Australia, and Korea is also available.

The news covered are mainly local and partly regional and international. News Hour is the hour-long news bulletin that is broadcast daily from 8 PM. Nhau / Indaba is another news bulletin that is split between Shona (Nhau) and Ndebele (Indaba) with each receiving 30 minutes time slot. Good Morning Zimbabwe is the daily morning news bulletin then there is also Lunch Time News.

Other popular TV shows include the Ezomgido, a local and regional musical show, Coke on the Beat which is a pop musical show, Studio 263, the country's first soap opera and other various local shows including current affairs and gospel shows.

Iconic locally produced content includes:

- Mukadota
- Ezomgido
- Stitsha
- Kukhulwa Kokuphela
- Tiriparwendo
- Studio 263
- Amakorokoza
- Sinjalo
- Timmy naBonzo
- Gringo

=== Sports ===
The station also broadcasts various live sports tournaments from around the country and some major tournaments around the world, including the FIFA World Cup, Olympics and the Africa Cup of Nations (AFCON).

Due to lack of finances which is believed to be caused by poor management and the corrupt board, the station is struggling to broadcast locally loved sport events like the Premier League, UEFA Champions League and many others.

Many local viewers are complaining about the station's poor broadcasting standard and are ditching it for foreign content distributors like Netflix and DStv.

== Programmes ==
=== Imported Programmes ===
==== Current ====
===== Children's programming =====
- Dino Dan
- Raggs

===== Animated =====
- The Adventures of Chuck and Friends
- Ben 10: Omniverse
- Biker Mice from Mars
- Curious George
- Daniel Tiger's Neighborhood
- Jake and the Never Land Pirates
- Legend of Enyo
- My Little Pony: Friendship Is Magic
- Pac-Man and the Ghostly Adventures
- The Penguins of Madagascar
- Poppy Cat
- Rocket Monkeys
- Sid the Science Kid
- Sofia the First
- SpongeBob SquarePants
- Teenage Mutant Ninja Turtles
- Transformers: Prime
- Totally Spies!
- Ultimate Spider-Man

===== Comedy =====
- All of Us
- The Big Bang Theory
- Cosby (2001, ABN relay)
- Everybody Loves Raymond (2001, ABN relay)
- Friends
- Girlfriends
- Just Shoot Me!
- Reed Between the Lines
- Seinfeld
- That '70s Show

===== Drama =====
- Alias
- Alphas
- Angel
- Heroes
- Miracles
- Scandal
- Smallville
- Supernatural

===== Education =====
- MythBusters

===== Documentary =====
- Green Planet
- I Shouldn't Be Alive
- Mayday

===== Cooking =====
- The Mind of a Chef

==== Former ====
===== Children's programming =====
- The Adventures of Rin Tin Tin
- Art Attack
- Bananas in Pyjamas
- Barney & Friends
- Big Blue Marble
- Brum
- Button Moon
- Captain Power and the Soldiers of the Future
- Catch Kandy
- The Enid Blyton Adventure Series
- The Fabulous Reggae Dogs
- The Famous Five
- The Famous Five
- Five Children and It
- Flicks
- Fun House
- Ghostwriter
- Go Go Giggles
- The Great Space Coaster
- Halfway Across the Galaxy and Turn Left
- The Henderson Kids
- iCarly
- Incredible Story Studio
- Jam
- Jim Henson's Animal Show
- Jim Henson's Mother Goose Stories
- Joe 90
- Johnson and Friends
- K.C. Undercover
- Kids Incorporated
- The Kids of Degrassi Street
- Lamb Chop's Play Along
- Lassie
- Magic Letters
- Masters of the Maze
- Mighty Morphin Power Rangers
- The Miraculous Mellops
- Mirror, Mirror
- Ocean Girl
- The Odyssey
- Pigasso's Place
- Pugwall
- Pugwall's Summer
- The Puzzle Place
- Rainbow
- Really Wild Animals
- Richard the Lionheart
- Rosie and Jim
- Round the Twist
- Sam & Cat
- Saturdee
- The Secret of Isis
- Sesame Street
- Shake It Up
- Skippy the Bush Kangaroo
- Square One Television
- Stars of the Zodiac
- Stingray
- Streetwise
- That's So Raven
- Teletubbies
- Thunderbirds
- The Tribe
- Tweenies
- T-Bag
- Victorious
- Wail of the Banshee
- Wild & Crazy Kids
- Wizadora
- Wizards Of Waverly Place
- Worzel Gummidge
- Xuxa

===== Animated =====
- 3-2-1 Penguins!
- The Addams Family
- The Adventures of Blinky Bill
- The Adventures of Huckleberry Finn
- The Adventures of Pow Wow
- The Adventures of Robinson Crusoe
- Adventures of Sonic the Hedgehog
- The Adventures of Teddy Ruxpin
- The Adventures of Tintin
- Albert the 5th Musketeer
- All Dogs Go to Heaven: The Series
- Around the World in 80 Days
- Around the World in 80 Dreams
- Alvin and the Chipmunks
- Avenger Penguins
- Babar
- Baby Bollies
- The Baby Huey Show
- Basket Fever
- Batman: The Animated Series
- Beast Wars: Transformers
- Bigfoot and the Muscle Machines
- Billy the Cat
- The Black Corsair
- Blinky Bill's Extraordinary Excursion
- Bob in a Bottle
- Bob the Builder
- Bozo: The World's Most Famous Clown
- BraveStarr
- The Bubblies
- Bucky O'Hare and the Toad Wars!
- Bugs Bunny
- Bugs Bunny and Friends
- Capitol Critters
- Captain America
- Captain Planet and the Planeteers
- Captain Pugwash
- Captain Star
- Captain Zed and the Zee Zone
- Care Bears
- Casper and Friends
- Casper the Friendly Ghost
- Cédric
- Challenge of the GoBots
- Chip 'n Dale: Rescue Rangers
- Choppy and the Princess
- Clutch Cargo
- Cococinel
- Code Lyoko
- Colonel Bleep
- Conan and the Young Warriors
- Conan the Adventurer
- C.O.P.S.
- Cro
- Count Duckula
- C.L.Y.D.E.
- Danger Mouse
- Darkwing Duck
- Defenders of the Earth
- Dennis the Menace
- Denver, the Last Dinosaur
- Detective Bogey
- Dexter's Laboratory
- Dick Spanner, P.I.
- Dinosaucers
- Dino-Riders
- Disney's Adventures of the Gummi Bears
- DoDo, The Kid from Outer Space
- Dog City
- Dogtanian and the Three Muskehounds
- Donald Duck
- Double Dragon
- Dragon Ball Z
- Dragon Flyz
- Dragon Hunters
- Dragon Tales
- The Dreamstone
- DuckTales
- Dungeons & Dragons
- Eckhart
- Ed, Edd n Eddy
- Eggzavier the Eggasaurus
- Enid Blyton's Enchanted Lands
- Extreme Ghostbusters
- Fables of the Green Forest
- Fairy Tale Police Department
- Fat Albert and the Cosby Kids
- Felix the Cat
- Ferdy the Ant
- The Flintstones
- Flipper & Lopaka
- The Flying House
- Funky Fables
- Frankenstein Jr. and The Impossibles
- Freaky Stories
- The Fruitties
- The Funny Company
- Galactik Football
- Galtar and the Golden Lance
- Garfield and Friends
- George of the Jungle
- Gerald McBoing-Boing
- The Giddy Game Show
- Godzilla
- Goof Troop
- The Greedysaurus Gang
- Grimm's Fairy Tale Classics
- Gustavus
- G.I. Joe Extreme
- G.I. Joe: A Real American Hero
- G.I. Joe: A Real American Hero
- Hammerman
- Hey Arnold!
- He-Man and the Masters of the Universe
- Highlander: The Animated Series
- The Houndcats
- Hoyt'n Andy's Sportsbender
- Hurricanes
- Iggy Arbuckle
- The Incredible Hulk
- Inhumanoids
- Inspector Gadget
- Inuyasha
- Iron Kid
- Jackie Chan Adventures
- Jackson 5ive
- Jana of the Jungle
- Jem
- Johnny Bravo
- The Jungle Book
- Kidd Video
- Kimba the White Lion
- Kim Possible
- King
- The King Kong Show
- Knights of the Zodiac
- Kong: The Animated Series
- Larryboy: The Cartoon Adventures
- Laurel & Hardy
- Lazer Tag Academy
- Legend of the Dragon
- The Legend of White Fang
- Leo the Lion
- Lilo & Stitch: The Series
- The Lion King's Timon & Pumbaa
- Little Hippo
- The Little Mermaid
- The Little Rascals
- Little Rosey
- The Littl' Bits
- Lucky Luke
- Looney Tunes
- Madeline
- The Magical Adventures of Quasimodo
- The Magical World of Gigi
- The Magician
- The Magic School Bus
- Magica and the Puzzle Plaza
- Maple Town
- The Marvel Super Heroes
- Master Raindrop
- Max & Ruby
- Maya the Honey Bee
- Mega Man
- Men in Black: The Animated Series
- Mickey Mouse
- The Mighty Hercules
- Mister T
- Monster by Mistake
- Moomin
- Mr. Bean: The Animated Series
- Mr. Magoo
- Muppet Babies
- My Little Pony 'n Friends
- My Little Pony Tales
- My Pet Monster
- Nanook's Great Hunt
- The New Adventures of Winnie the Pooh
- The New Adventures of Zorro
- New Kids on the Block
- Noddy's Toyland Adventures
- The Noozles
- Nudnik
- Oggy and the Cockroaches
- Once Upon a Time
- Once Upon a Time... Life
- Once Upon a Time... The Americas
- Ox Tales
- Paddington
- Painted Tales
- Papa Beaver's Storytime
- Phantom Investigators
- Piggsburg Pigs!
- Pingu
- The Pink Panther Show
- Pinky and the Brain
- Police Academy
- Popeye
- Popeye and Son
- Pound Puppies
- The Powerpuff Girls
- The Power Team
- Princesse Shéhérazade
- Project G.e.e.K.e.R.
- Professor Balthazar
- ProStars
- The Proud Family
- The Raccoons
- The Raggy Dolls
- Rambo: The Force of Freedom
- The Real Ghostbusters
- ReBoot
- Redbeard
- Ring Raiders
- The Road Runner Show
- Robin Hood
- Robinson Sucroe
- RoboCop
- Robotech
- Roger Ramjet
- Rude Dog and the Dweebs
- Rugrats
- Rupert
- Saban's Adventures of Peter Pan
- Saban's Adventures of Pinocchio
- Saban's Gulliver's Travels
- Saber Rider and the Star Sheriffs
- Samurai Pizza Cats
- Samurai X
- Sandokan
- Scooby-Doo, Where Are You!
- Sea Dogs
- She-Ra: Princess of Power
- The Silver Brumby
- Simba: The King Lion
- The Simpsons
- Skyland
- Slim Pig
- The Smoggies
- The Smurfs
- Sonic the Hedgehog
- Spartakus & the Sun Beneath the Sea
- Speed Racer
- Spider Riders
- Spider-Man
- Spiff and Hercules
- Spiral Zone
- Staines Down Drains
- Star Street: The Adventures of the Star Kids
- Stone Protectors
- Street Football
- Supa Strikas
- Super Chicken
- Super Dave: Daredevil for Hire
- Super Mario Bros.
- Superbook
- Superman
- SuperTed
- Swamp Thing
- The Sylvester & Tweety Mysteries
- Tales from the Cryptkeeper
- TaleSpin
- Tarzan, Lord of the Jungle
- Taz-Mania
- Teenage Mutant Ninja Turtles
- Three Little Ghosts
- The Three Musketeers
- ThunderCats
- Thundersub
- Tic Tac Toons
- Tifu
- Toad Patrol
- Tom and Jerry
- Tom & Jerry Kids
- Tom Slick
- Tombik & B.B. Show
- Top Cat
- Totally Tooned In
- Towser
- The Transformers
- Transformers: Animated
- The Triplets
- Tupu
- Turtle Hero
- The Ugly Duckling and Me!
- Ultimate Book of Spells
- The Undersea Adventures of Captain Nemo
- Victor & Hugo: Bunglers in Crime
- Video Power
- Visionaries: Knights of the Magical Light
- Voltron: Defender of the Universe
- Wacky Races
- Watership Down
- What About Mimi?
- What's New, Mr. Magoo?
- Where's Wally?
- Widget
- Wild C.A.T.s
- William's Wish Wellingtons
- The Wind in the Willows
- Wolves, Witches and Giants
- The World of Peter Rabbit and Friends
- X-Men
- Yu-Gi-Oh!
- Zeke's Pad
- Zoe and Charlie

===== Talk Shows =====
- The Ellen DeGeneres Show
- Sally Jesse Raphael
- Teen Scene

===== Drama =====
- 21 Jump Street
- 24
- The A-Team
- Acapulco H.E.A.T.
- The Adventures of the Black Stallion
- Andromeda
- Beauty and the Beast
- Beverly Hills, 90210
- The Bill
- The Bionic Woman
- The Buccaneers
- Bordertown
- Boston Legal
- The Champions
- Coronet Blue
- Criminal Minds
- The Crow: Stairway to Heaven
- Dark Angel
- Danger Man
- Daktari
- Desperate Housewives
- Destination Fire
- Doctor Who
- Dr. Finlay's Casebook
- ER
- Fame
- Fame L.A.
- The Flash
- Flipper
- Friday the 13th: The Series
- Hardcastle and McCormick
- Hawaii Five-O
- Hawkeye
- Hercules: The Legendary Journeys
- Highway Patrol
- Hooperman
- The House of Elliot
- The Incredible Hulk
- Jacob's Cross
- Joan of Arcadia
- Journey to the West
- Katts and Dog
- Knight Rider
- Kung Fu
- Land of the Giants
- The Legend of the Hidden City
- The Legend of William Tell
- Lie Down with Lions
- Little House on the Prairie
- Lost in Space
- L.A. Law
- L.A. Heat
- MacGyver
- Magnum, P.I.
- The Man from U.N.C.L.E.
- Martial Law
- Miami Sands
- Miami Vice
- Mission: Impossible
- The Mod Squad
- Moonlighting
- Mr. Novak
- Murder, She Wrote
- Mutant X
- Night Man
- North of 60
- Pacific Blue
- The Pallisers
- Paradise
- The Professionals
- Queen of Swords
- Renegade
- Rich Man, Poor Man
- Robocop: The Series
- Salem's Lot
- The Six Million Dollar Man
- Softly, Softly
- Sonny Spoon
- Space 1999
- Star Trek: The Original Series
- Stargate SG-1
- Suburban Bliss
- The Sweeney
- Tales of the South Seas
- Tarzan
- This Life
- Thunder in Paradise
- Tour of Duty
- T. J. Hooker
- V
- The Villagers
- Viper
- Wagon Train
- Walker, Texas Ranger
- Wonder Woman
- Xena: Warrior Princess
- Z-Cars

===== Comedy =====
- 227
- 3rd Rock from the Sun
- 'Allo 'Allo!
- The Addams Family
- ALF
- All of Us
- Are You Being Served?
- Batman
- The Beverly Hillbillies
- Bewitched
- The Bob Morrison Show
- Boogies Diner
- Charlie Chaplin
- The Cosby Show
- The Dukes of Hazzard
- Family Matters
- Fawlty Towers
- The Fresh Prince of Bel-Air
- Get Smart
- The Golden Girls
- Hancock's Half Hour
- Hangin' with Mr. Cooper
- Harry's Girls
- Home Improvement
- I Dream of Jeannie
- The Jack Benny Program
- The Jeffersons
- Kate & Allie
- Keeping Up Appearances
- Kids Say the Darndest Things
- The Life of Riley
- The Love Boat
- Love Thy Neighbour
- The Lucy Show
- Maverick
- Mind Your Language
- Minor Adjustments
- The Melting Pot
- The Monkees
- Mrs Thursday
- The Munsters
- The Muppet Show
- My Wife and Kids
- One Foot in the Grave
- One on One
- Punky Brewster
- Rhoda
- Roc
- Roseanne
- Sabrina, the Teenage Witch
- Sanford and Son
- Taxi

===== Documentary =====
- Mysteries, Magic and Miracles
- A Nuclear Free Pacific
- The Other Side of the Moon
- Rescue 911
- Strange but True?

===== Soap Opera =====
- All My Children
- Another Life
- Capitol
- A Country Practice
- The Colbys
- Dallas
- Dynasty
- Falcon Crest
- Knots Landing
- Melrose Place
- Neighbours
- Passions (also carried under ABN)
- Peyton Place
- Santa Barbara
- Sons and Daughters
- Sunset Beach

===== Anthology =====
- Alfred Hitchcock Presents
- Hammer House of Horror
- The Loretta Young Show
- The Twilight Zone

===== Education =====
- Encyclopædia Britannica

===== Military =====
- Tour of Duty

===== Game Shows =====
- The Crystal Maze

===== Variety =====
- Hollywood A Go-Go
- Keeping Up With The Kardashians
- Little Women: Atlanta
- Little Women: LA
- The Mickey Mouse Club
- Nightcap
- The Red Skelton Show

===== Telenovela =====
- Aurora
- Corazón valiente
- El fantasma de Elena
- La impostora
- Mi corazón insiste en Lola Volcán
- My 3 Sisters
- Pasión prohibida
- Santa Diabla

===== Wrestling =====
- WWF Superstars of Wrestling

== Studios and location ==
ZBC TV broadcasts mainly from the studios in Pockets Hill, in a suburb of Highlands, in Harare. It has another studio located in Bulawayo, in a suburb of Montrose.

The broadcasting centre in Pockets Hill was commissioned in 1970, while the new building was commissioned by the former president, Robert Mugabe in 1994.
