= DJA =

DJA or Dja may refer to:

- Daniel Jenkins Academy of Technology, a school in Haines City, Florida
- DJA FM, a Chadian radio station
- The Dja River, located in Cameroon
- Dja Faunal Reserve, located near the Dja River in Cameroon
- Dja, a sub-divided unit of the hekat, an ancient Egyptian volume unit
- Dja Dja Wurrung people, an Aboriginal Australian people

Some people have Dja as part of their names:

- Brice Dja Djédjé, a soccer player from Côte d'Ivoire
- Franck Dja Djédjé, a soccer player from Côte d'Ivoire
- Félix Dja Ettien, a soccer player from Côte d'Ivoire
- Peggy Lam Pei Yu-dja, the CEO of the Family Planning Association of Hong Kong
