= Radio 2 =

Radio 2 may refer to:

- ABC Radio 2, former name of ABC's Radio National, Australia (1947–1985)
- BBC Radio 2, a British national music radio station
- CBC Radio 2, the former name of Canadian national music radio network CBC Music
- CyBC Radio 2, Cyprus national radio
- KBS Radio 2, a South Korean radio station
  - KBS 2FM, branded as KBS Cool FM, a South Korean radio station
- NPO Radio 2, a Dutch radio station
- Radio 2 (Australian radio station), a defunct narrowband Australian radio network (2001–2006)
- Radio 2 (Belgium), a Belgian radio station
- Radio 2 (Denmark), a defunct Danish radio station
- Raadio 2 (Radio 2), an Estonian radio station
- Radio 2 (Ghana), a national radio station in Ghana
- Radio 2 (Hong Kong), a Hong Kong radio station
- Rai Radio 2, an Italian radio station
- RTÉ 2fm, an Irish music radio station originally known as Radio 2
- NHK Radio 2, a defunct Japanese radio station

== See also ==
- Radio 2 in the Park, a British music festival
