= Edith WeUtonga =

Zimbabwean musician (born 1979)

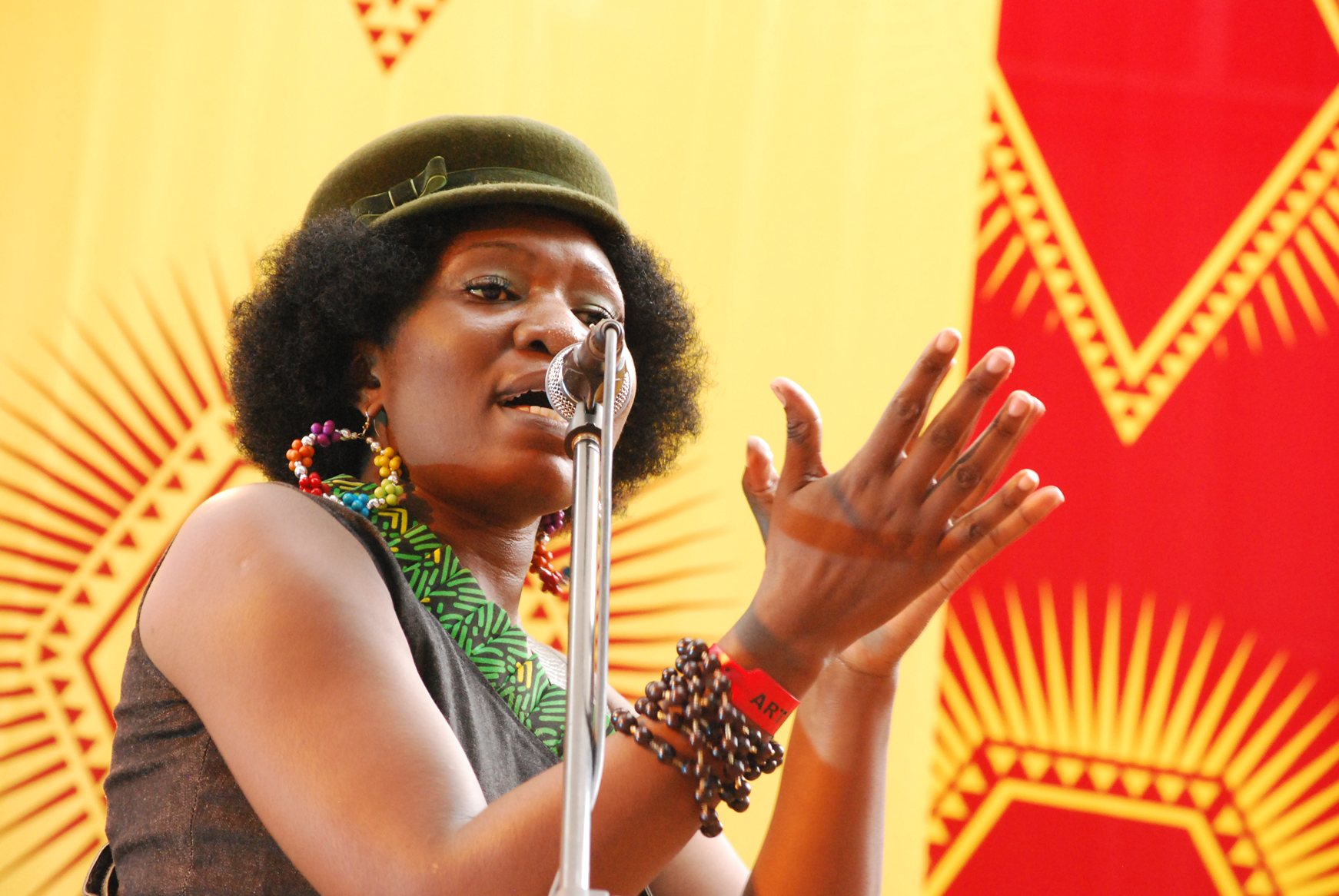
- Here at HIFA 2011 at the Global Stage

Background information
- Also known as: Mhamha Bass
- Born: Edith Katiji; 22 April 1979 (age 47); Kadoma, Zimbabwe
- Origin: Harare, Zimbabwe
- Genres: Afro jazz & Zimbabwean Traditional
- Occupation: Singer-songwriter
- Instruments: Bass guitar, acoustic guitar, mbira and drums
- Years active: 2000–present
- Labels: Family Affair, Sheer
- Formerly of: So What

Edith Katiji, known professionally as Edith WeUtonga (born 22 April 1979), is a Zimbabwean Afro jazz and traditional music artist, bass guitarist, songwriter, actress and music teacher. She was born in Kadoma, which lies approximately 166 kilometres (103 mi), by road, southwest of Harare. Being of Malawi origin and growing up in Bulawayo she sings in four different languages mainly Shona, Chichewa, Ndebele and English. Her band is called Utonga which means dawn. She is one of only a few bass guitarists in Zimbabwe who is also a lead vocalist for a band. She also plays the acoustic guitar, mbira and drums.

== Career ==
After completing her secondary education, she pursued music with the Army School of Music at the Brady Barracks, in Zimbabwe's second city of Bulawayo, where she started off as a vocalist with the Army Band and soon moved on to the city's famed Amakhosi Township Square Cultural Centre. While there, she joined a six-month musical instruments crash course for women musicians.

This gave birth to the all-female band from Amakhosi called Amakhosikazi ["Queens"], where she started off as composer and lead vocalist for the band and later discovered her passion for the bass guitar. Amakhosikazi disbanded in mid-2006.

Katiji the bassist formed a new band from the remnants of Amakhosikazi, called So What?! The group relocated to Harare and joined the live music circuit at many of the popular city-centre venues, including the famous Book Café and Mannenberg, The Kraal, Jazz 105 and Sports Diner. In 2008 So What?! went through some changes after a few key members left for greener pastures as the economic situation in the country worsened. The new, rather depleted version of So What?! continued to meet their music commitments – until her near-fatal car accident.

Katiji is married to Zimbabwean filmmaker Elton Mjanana and they have two children together. In 2019, Edith graduated from Midlands State University (MSU) with an Honours degree in Music Business, Musicology and Technology.

A founding president of the Zimbabwe Music Union(ZIMU), in 2021 Katiji became the first black woman to be elected as the Vice president of the International Federation of Musicians (FIM) in 2021.

== Life-threatening accident ==
Katiji had near-fatal car accident in July 2008, when she sustained serious head and facial injuries and was in a coma for almost two weeks. The accident left her physically scarred on her face and she lost a friend who had been in the passenger seat.

== Utonga - A New Dawn ==
During her recovery, she had discovered a new sound within herself. She felt that her scrape with death, followed shortly afterward by the birth of her second son, presented her with a new beginning in life, calling the new sound Utonga, meaning "dawn", and re-branded herself and her band as Edith weUtonga ("Edith of Dawn").

== Acting ==
Edith is also an actor. While at Amakhosi, she featured in productions including Athol Fugard's Hello & Goodbye, the Greek classic Lysistrata, Raisedon Baya's Tomorrow's People. Away from Amakhosi, she scored leading roles in Alone But Together by Wonder Guchu and also Silent Words by Tawanda Kanegoni, which made its debut at the Harare International Festival of the Arts (HIFA). It was Cont Mhlanga, founder of Amakhosi, who introduced her to the small screen by giving her a leading role as Mai Shupi in the TV drama Sinjalo. She won an award for her performance. She also toured locally and regionally with theatre production by ArtsLab called Standing in Pairs, which performed at the Grahamstown Festival.

== Awards and nominations ==
Year	Award	Category	Result
2018	Roil Bulawayo Arts Awards (RoilBAAs)	Outstanding Alternative Music	Won
2018	Women Achievers Awards	Women in the Arts	Won
2014	National Arts Merit Awards (NAMA)	Outstanding Female Musician	Nominated
2014	Zimbabwe Music Awards (ZIMA)	Best Female Musician Best Alternative Act	Nominated
2012	National Arts Merit Awards (NAMA)	Outstanding Actress	Won

== Discography ==
=== Albums ===
- Utonga (Family Affair Productions), 2010
- Kwacha (Family Affair Productions), 2013
- Madalitso (Family Affair Productions), 2018

=== Singles ===
- "Ngizohamba" (2003)

=== Collaborations ===
- "Agodoka The Remix feat Outspoken", 2014
- "Ndaposha" featuring Clare Nyakujara (POVOAfrika & Family Affair Productions), 2014

=== Featured by ===
- Publish The Quest: "Never Again, 2014
- Publish The Quest: "Shine", 2014

=== Compilations ===
- Zimbabwe Awake Vol. 1 [Africa Awake CD series] 2014
- SpeakSing+ Vol 01 2014
