= Cococinel =

French-Belgian children's TV programme

- Created by: Nicole Gorgeon
- Countries of origin: Belgium, France
- No. of seasons: 1
- No. of episodes: 52

Production
- Running time: 5 minutes

Original release
- Network: TF1
- Release: 1992 – 1992

Cococinel is a French-Belgian children's television cartoon that was created by Nicole Gorgeon. Directed by Raymond Burlet and written by Yolande Baillet and Jean Montagné, 52 episodes of the animated cartoon were made in 1992.

The main character is a ladybug who has a magic four-leaf clover with incredible powers, which made her strong, and thanks to this, Cococinel defends her forest city called Cocoland from terrible threats. Also, sometimes, aided by her friends, she teaches about ecology and the environment.

== Plot ==
Cococinel is a ladybug (coco) who lives in a forest village called Cocoland alongside other ladybugs, all called cocos, who are distinguished from one another by their coloring. Living in Cocoland are Coco Orange Coco Blue, Coco Grass (green), Madame Cigale—who serves as the teacher for the cocos—the twins Ben-Yes and Ben-No (yellow), Oscarabus, a long beetle who serves as transportation for the cocos to get to school (hence the origin of his name), Gre-Gre the frog, Coco Meteo, the arrogant meteorologist, and Coco Mauve (purple), who is always in a bad mood.

On a sunny day at school, Madame Cigale told her students the legend of a magic clover that grows in the clover field, and it would only obey someone with a pure heart. Cococinel later then noticed a clover that stood out from the rest, because it had four leaves instead of three. When she touched it, the clover shrank and settled onto Cococinel's chest right over her heart, proving it had found its true owner. From that day forward, Cococinel is always there to lend a hand to her friends whenever they find themselves in trouble from villains who attack the village, and thanks to her magic clover, every problem gets solved with the help of her clover, in their peaceful animal community.

Oscarabus, the beetle bus, takes a group to school every morning, including Ben-Yes and Ben-No, the funny twins; Cocoblue, the absent-minded poet; Cocomauve, the perpetual complainer; and Cococinel, the magical heroine of Cocoland, always ready to help her friends solve their problems. Everything would be perfect if Cocoland was not constantly threatened by envious predators. Cococinel uses her four-leaf clover powers to maintain the balance in their small community.

Episodes are five minutes long.

== Characters ==
Cococinel is known as the luck bug, thanks to her magical four-leaf clover that grants her special powers. Besides being symbols of good luck, ladybugs combat harmful insects in real life, protecting gardens and crops. This natural trait of ladybugs is reflected in Cococinel's character, who fights against evil forces and protects her home, embodying both a defensive and protective nature. This duality of defense and protection is central to her character, making Cococinel a heroic figure both on-screen and in symbolism.

Cococinel was born in late 1989 by the French company Jemini, as a small plush toy created by Nicole Gorgeon... But the young Belgian, Jean Montagne, was fascinated by the design and the idea, so together with Nicole, he decided to create a whole world for Cococinel, giving her friendly companions and terrible enemies. They brought a plush toy to life, but made it something much more beautiful. The story centers on Cocolandia, a place populated by colorful ladybugs that is frequently threatened. But Cococinel is always there to protect it because she found the magic clover thanks to her pure heart. Season 1 premiered in 1992, releasing 52 short, 5-minute episodes. Later, Jemini released plush toys and other toys inspired by the new characters and concepts invented for the series and future concepts.

== Synopsis ==
Cococinel is a heroine who acquires magical powers by finding a mysterious four-leaf clover and uses it to protect her world against the forces of evil. She balances her mission with a common life with her core group of friends in Cocoland, her village, throughout her adventures. She knows how to familiarize children with the life of nature. Oscarabus, the beetle bus, takes her and her friends to school every morning, including, among others, Ben-Yes and Ben-No: the funny twins, Cocoblue: the absent-minded poet, Cocomauve: the eternal complainer, and, of course, Cococinel, always ready to help her friends solve their little problems. Everything would be fine if Cocoland were not regularly threatened by envious and jealous predators. Cococinel watches over and, using the powers of her magical clover, preserves the balance of the small community.

The episodes have a duration of five minutes.

== Episode list ==
Season 1:

- 1. The Magic Clover
- 2. Ambush
- 3. Storm at Cocoland
- 4. Hold Up at School
- 5. The Forbidden Path
- 6. The Great Shadow
- 7. Panic at the Pond
- 8. Cococinel and the Décorticus
- 9. The Departure of Hirondella
- 10. What a Champ This Cricket Is
- 11. The Apprentice Cricket
- 12. The Fire
- 13. Investigation at Cocoland
- 14. The Rosebuds
- 15. The Infernal Machine
- 16. The Typographe
- 17. The Revenge
- 18. The Friendly Modiste
- 19. Biotope in Danger
- 20. A Frog's Hunger
- 21. The Champion of Cocoland
- 22. Fly Alert
- 23. Garnished Bouquets
- 24. Beware of Temptation
- 25. The Great Invasion
- 26. Storm at Cocoland
- 27. He Who Believed to Trap, Got Trapped
- 28. Adventures Underground
- 29. For a Few More Blueberries
- 30. Crash
- 31. Dory the Strong
- 32. Failed Escape
- 33. The Punishment
- 34. Full Sun
- 35. The Moonbeam
- 36. The Weather is Crazy
- 37. Lady Cicada Seeks Her Voice
- 38. Icebreaker
- 39. Singing Contest
- 40. Just a Kiss
- 41. Cocomedia Dell'Arte
- 42. Wave of Soul and Life Bubble
- 43. Cheating is Not Playing
- 44. Dream Holidays
- 45. Funny Back-to-School
- 46. General Panic
- 47. Hunger Justifies the Means
- 48. One Good Turn Deserves Another
- 49. The Great Drought
- 50. There is Water in the Air
- 51. A Golden Voice
- 52. A Crazy Crazy Clover

== Home media ==
- In the UK, the English version was released on six VHS cassettes with each of them containing eleven episodes. Exactly the same as the French VHS version with eleven episodes separated by title cards in each episode.
- In Germany it had a single release on VHS. Combining many of the episodes dubbed in German to form a kind of film, the German dubbing was released exclusively for VHS, it was not broadcast on television.
- In 2008, Europacorp released a DVD with the complete series. Very few units were manufactured, so few that to this day none can be found, not even second-hand. and it was the first non-vintage article in the series and also the last.

== TV broadcasting ==
- France: TF1 (1992–1997)
- UK: Tiny TCC (1995–1997)
- Spain: Canal Panda (1997)
- Argentina: Magic Kids (1996–1997)
- Namibia: NBC (1993–1994)
- Slovakia: STV (1993)
- Poland: TVP1 (1993)
- Zimbabwe: ZBC TV
- Greece: Makedonia TV (1992)
- Belgium: Ketnet (1998)
- Israel: Arutz HaYeladim (1996)
- South Africa: TV1
