= Ulysse FM =

- Tunisia
- Broadcast area: Tunisia
- Frequencies: Djerba 92.1MHz; south East 104.3MHz

Ownership
- Owner: Jamel Eddine HENCHIRI

History
- First air date: June 16, 2012

Links
- Website: Ulysse FM

Ulysse FM is a regional Tunisian radio station directed towards the southeast Tunisian community. Ulysse Fm supports cultural and economic development of the region.

== History ==
The station began broadcasting on June 16, 2012 from their Djerba studios. Ulysse FM is a private firm created after the Jasmine revolution. Ulysse FM was first granted a provisional licence to broadcast in the governorate of Medenine in August 2011. It was later granted a permanent licence by the HAICA. It broadcasts on 2 frequencies via the National Broadcasting Office (ONT), and streams programmes on its website. It benefits from a UNESCO IPDC59 grant to support illiterate working women in southeast Tunisia, through the Ulysse FM radio programme, "LELLET EL FM".

Moreover, the radio participates, among all the Tunisian media, in the freedom of speech included in the constitution.

== Key people ==
- Jamel Eddine Henchiri, chairman
- Chokri Chouat, General Manager

== See also ==
- Shems FM
