= 95.8 Central Radio =

- Gweru; Zimbabwe
- Broadcast area: Gweru & Midlands
- Frequency: FM 95.8 MHz

Programming
- Languages: English; Ndebele; Shona
- Format: Music, News, Lifestyle

Ownership
- Owner: ZBC
- Sister stations: Khulumani FM; Radio Zimbabwe; Power FM; National FM; Classic 263

Links
- Webcast: Listen Live
- Website: centralradio.co.zw

95.8 Central Radio is a Zimbabwean state owned provincial radio station that is based and operates in the Midlands Province's capital, Gweru.
