= Shaya FM =

Online radio station

Shaya FM is a community internet radio station which focuses on Mthwakazi (i.e. Matabeleland regions of Zimbabwe) and Southern Africa. This is a mixed speech and music station and the music policy includes the following genres: Kwaito, House, Jazz, Gospel, Mbaqanga, Imbube, Isitshikitsha, Kalanga Rumba, and many more music styles.

Shaya FM serves Mthwakazi and Southern African people in the Diaspora. They play authentic music and air talk programming which is informative and reflects the culture and the heritage of the people of Mthwakazi.

This station also provides balanced news. The broadcasters also carry news items and current affairs during their programmes.

This station's listeners are from different backgrounds and all ages.

The presenters/broadcasters on Shaya FM are volunteering individuals from diverse disciplines with in depth information knowledge of their programmes and have a tolerance of different views.

Shaya FM is run by Inkundla Community Interest Company.
