= Express FM =

Programming
- Format: Business news

Ownership
- Owner: Mourad Gueddiche, Naoufel Ben Rayana

History
- First air date: October 21, 2010

Links
- Website: Express FM

Express FM is a private Tunisian radio station specializing in economics which was founded on October 21, 2010 by Mourad Gueddiche and Naoufel Ben Rayana, co-founders of Maghreb Productions Communication (MPC). Express FM is the fifth-launched private radio station in Tunisia.

== Key people ==
- Karim Benamor, Head of Programming
- Najoua Rahoui, General Manager

== See also ==
- Shems FM
