= Jawhara FM =

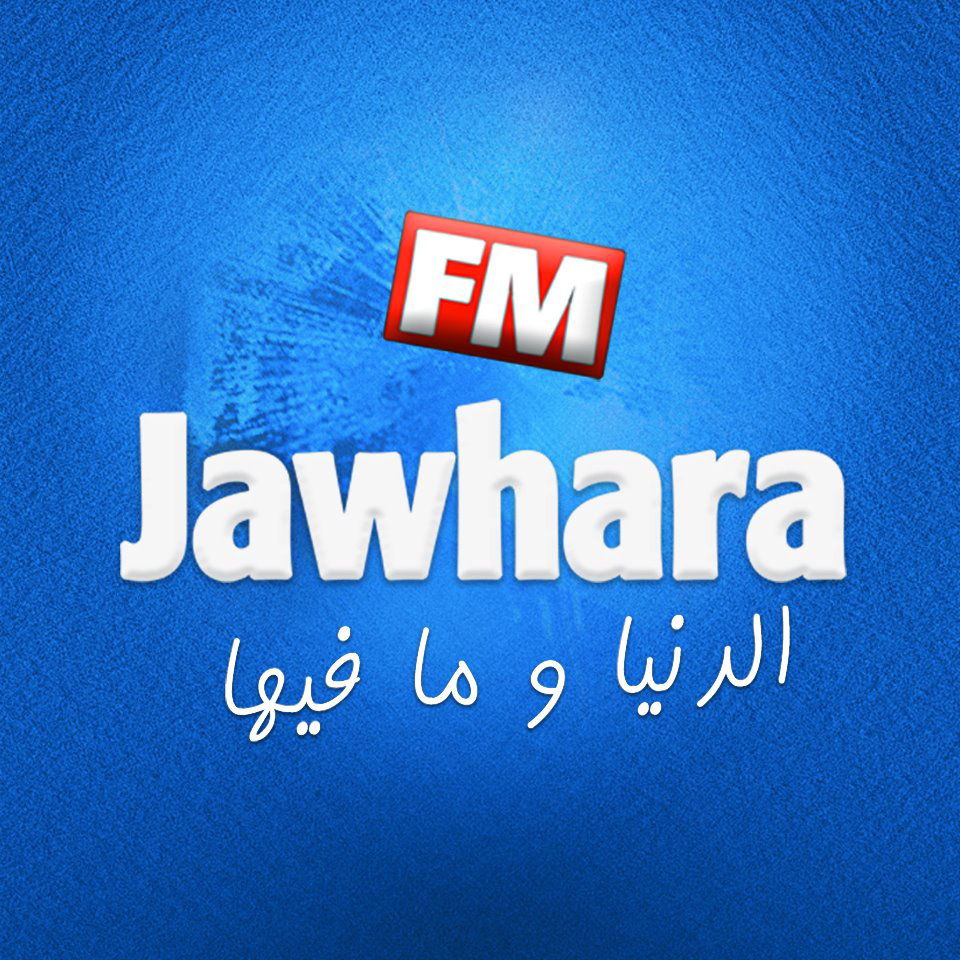

Sousse; Tunisia
- Frequencies: 89.4, 90.7, 102.5, 103.2, 104.4, 107.3 MHz

Programming
- Languages: Arabic, Tunisian Arabic and French

Ownership
- Owner: (Private-Commercial)

History
- First air date: 25 July 2005

Links
- Webcast: www.jawharafm.net/ar/live-audio
- Website: www.jawharafm.net/ar/

Jawhara FM (Arabic: جوهرة أف أم); is a private radio station in Tunisia.

Generalist radio whose studios are located in Sousse, it was launched on 25 July 2005 by the voice of Walid Besbes. The name Jawhara FM refers to the nickname given in Tunisia to the city of Sousse, the "pearl of the Sahel", the word jawhara in Arabic meaning "pearl".
