= YAFM =

Ya FM
Zvishavane; Zimbabwe
- Frequencies: 91.8 MHz, 101.9 MHz

Ownership
- Owner: Ray of Hope

History
- First air date: 2015

Links
- Webcast: https://tunein.com/radio/YAFM-918-s263767/
- Website: www.yafm.co.zw

Ya FM (91.8 and 101.9) is a community radio station licensed in March 2015. The station is located in Zvishavane, Zimbabwe.
