= Metro FM (Nepal) =

Radio station in Kathmandu

- Kathmandu, Nepal; Nepal
- Frequency: 94.6 MHz

Programming
- Language: Nepali

Ownership
- Owner: Kathmandu Metropolitan City

History
- First air date: September 17, 1998

Links
- Website: metronews.kathmandu.gov.np

Metro FM is a radio station in Nepal, established by Kathmandu Metropolitan City. It received its operating license on March 9, 1998, from the government. After receiving the license, the station began its test transmission on September 17, 1998. On September 18, 1999, the station began its official transmission.

Originally, the station began its transmission on 106.7 MHz. Currently, it is operating on 94.6 MHz using 500 watts transmitter.

Currently, the station is on-air from 5:30 AM till 10 PM. The station is located in city hall, Bhrikuti mandap, Kathmandu.
