= DJA FM =

Chadian radio station

- N'Djamena; Chad
- Frequency: 96.9 MHz

Programming
- Languages: French, Arabic

History
- First air date: 1998

Links
- Website: DJA FM on Facebook

DJA FM 96.9 is a Chadian radio station. Established in 1998, this was the first privately owned radio station in N'Djamena, Chad. Its president is Zara Yacoub. DJA is a non-specialised radio with an orientation towards the young people and women. The programming consists of news, magazines and interactive transmissions, in French and local Arabic over 60 hours a week.

== See also ==
- Media of Chad
- List of radio stations in Africa
