= ZBC National FM =

- Harare; Zimbabwe
- Broadcast area: Zimbabwe
- Frequency: FM 103.1 MHz in Bulawayo

Programming
- Language: 14 Languages
- Format: Music; Talk; Educational

Ownership
- Owner: ZBC
- Sister stations: Khulumani FM; Power FM; 95.8 Central Radio; Radio Zimbabwe; Classic 263

Links
- Webcast: Listen Live
- Website: www.nationalfm.co.zw

National FM, formerly Radio 4, is a state-owned Zimbabwean radio station that broadcasts in 14 indigenous Zimbabwean languages.

The station is known for promoting every culture and language across the country. It was launched as an educational radio station in the early 80s by the state broadcaster and used to broadcast educational content. Recently, the station broadcasts predominantly in Shona and Ndebele. Other languages can be heard during news bulletins, but not as frequently as the station claims.

It is now based in Harare, broadcasting across the country. Its target audience is mainly the rural community and listeners that prefer radio in local languages.
