= Cap FM =

Hammamet; Tunisia
- Frequencies: 95.2, 105.6 and 91.5 MHz

Programming
- Language: Arabic, Tunisian Arabic

History
- First air date: 24 March 2012

Links
- Webcast: www.cap-fm.tn/ar/live/
- Website: www.cap-fm.tn

Cap FM (Arabic: كاب اف ام); is a private generalist radio station in Tunisia.

Based in its Hammamet studios, it was founded by Olfa Tounsi on 24 March 2012. It broadcasts mainly in the regions of Nabeul and Grand Tunis. Its name refers to the name given in Tunisia to the region of Nabeul, Cape Bon.
