= Breeze FM 91.2 =

Victoria Falls; Zimbabwe
- Broadcast area: Victoria Falls and Hwange
- Frequency: FM 91.2 MHz

Programming
- Language: English; Ndebele; Nambya; Tonga; Xhosa; Shona
- Format: Music, News, Current Affairs

Ownership
- Owner: Fairtalk Communications
- Sister stations: Skyz Metro FM

History
- First air date: 11 Sep 2016

Technical information
- Licensing authority: BAZ

Links
- Webcast: Listen Live
- Website: breezefm.co.zw

Breeze FM is the first commercial radio station in Victoria Falls, Zimbabwe.

The radio station broadcasts to the wide and cosmopolitan audience within the 60-80 km radius from Victoria Falls. The broadcasting radius covers the urban and rural areas that surround the resort city of Victoria Falls.The radio station broadcasts in English and variety of local languages which include Ndebele, Nambya, Tonga, Shona and Xhosa among others.
