= Hit Radio (Morocco) =

- Rabat; Morocco
- Broadcast area: Morocco, Spain, Portugal, Belgium, Burkina Faso, Burundi, Chad, Central African Republic, Comoros, Gabon, Ivory Coast, Niger, Senegal, Togo
- Frequency: See list

Programming
- Languages: French, Arabic, English
- Format: Top 40

History
- First air date: 2008

Technical information
- Transmitter coordinates: 33°58′14″N 6°50′45″W

Links
- Website: https://new.hitradio.ma/fr

Hit Radio is a leading Moroccan radio station established in 2008 in Rabat, broadcasting news and recent hits from all over the world in addition to talents from Morocco and the Arab World. It also publishes its own greatly followed weekly Top 30 singles chart. According to the station, 40% of its output is on young Moroccan artists.

The station has also developed internationally with stations of similar format in Africa and parts of Europe, most notably Portugal, Senegal and Togo.

== Programming ==
- Momo Morning Show -
- Top 30 - Morocco's top 30 songs
- Hit Radio Party Mix - Armin van Buuren's A State of Trance, UMF Radio, Tiesto's Club Life, and Spinnin Sessions.

== Frequencies ==
City	Country	Frequency
Abidjan	Ivory Coast	93.3
Afourar	Morocco	98.1
Agadir	Morocco	95.6
Ani Bni mathar	Morocco	92.0
Akhfennir	Morocco	99.5
Al Hoceima	Morocco	90.8
Al Mahbas	Morocco	92.8
Asilah	Morocco	97.1
Assa	Morocco	97.6
Azilal	Morocco	98.1
Azougar	Morocco	94.6
Azrou	Morocco	94.6
Dakhla	Morocco	99.7
Ghafsai	Morocco	100.9
Goulmima	Morocco	97.5
Guelmim	Morocco	98.5
Tetouan	Morocco	97.8
Ifrane	Morocco	94.6
Cape Spartel	Morocco	96.4
Casablanca	Morocco	100.3
Chefchaouen	Morocco	100.7
Palomas	Spain	90.8
Pointe Noire	Republic of the Congo	97.7
Port Gentil	Gabon	98.5
Tangier	Morocco	91.4
Zag	Morocco	96.2
Zagora	Morocco	91.8
Zerhoune	Morocco	96.6
Zinguinchor	Senegal	88.6
Laayoune	Morocco	91.6
Lamsid	Morocco	100.6
Larache	Morocco	96.7
Lisbon	Portugal	106.4
Libreville	Gabon	98.5
Lome	Togo	104.7
Fes	Morocco	94.1
Figuig	Morocco	97.8
Fnideq	Morocco	95.5
Foum Zguid	Morocco	99.5
Jbel Lahbib	Morocco	96.1
Jbel Mezgout	Morocco	99.7
Jbel Tazekka	Morocco	99.5
Jbel Zalagh	Morocco	94.1
Jdiria	Morocco	98.4
N'Djamena	Chad	97.5
Nador	Morocco	92.6
Namur	Belgium	94.4
Niamey	Niger	88.7
Rabat	Morocco	99.8
Rich	Morocco	99.0
Rommani	Morocco	99.4
Mahbes	Morocco	92.8
Marrakesh	Morocco	94.4
Mehdia	Morocco	107.6
Meknes	Morocco	96.6
Melloussa	Morocco	91.4
Ouanougha	Algeria	99.4
Merchich	Morocco	98.9
M'hamid Al Ghizlane	Morocco	99.8
Midlet	Morocco	99.9
Mirleft	Morocco	87.9
Missour	Morocco	98.1
Monaco	Monaco	94.5
Mohammedia	Morocco	100.3
Moulay Bousselham	Morocco	92.8
Tafraoute	Morocco	89.6
Taliouine	Morocco	98.5
Tamanar	Morocco	97.8
Tan Tan	Morocco	97.0
Tan Tan Plage	Morocco	99.6
Tanger	Morocco	99.4
Tanger Med	Morocco	91.4
Taounate	Morocco	103.6
Taourirt	Morocco	98.8
Taouz	Morocco	100.9
Tarfaya	Morocco	97.2
Targuist	Morocco	106.2
Taroudant	Morocco	99.9
Tata	Morocco	98.6
Taza	Morocco	99.5
Temara	Morocco	99.8
Tiguelmamine	Morocco	102.7
Timoulay	Morocco	91.5
Tinghir	Morocco	98.0
Tinjdad	Morocco	97.5
Tiznit	Morocco	91.5
Touzarine	Morocco	99.7
Kaolack	Senegal	96.7
Kassita	Morocco	99.7
Kenitra	Morocco	107.6
Khemisset	Morocco	96.6
Khenifra	Morocco	101.2
Khouribga	Morocco	101.4
Ksar el Kbir	Morocco	92.8
Ksar Sghir	Morocco	91.4
Oued Laou	Morocco	99.2
Oualidia	Morocco	91.7
Ouarzazate	Morocco	92.0
Ouazzane	Morocco	104.8
Oued Zem	Morocco	101.4
Ougadougo	Burkina Faso	95.6
Oujda	Morocco	98.5
Oukaimeden	Morocco	94.4
Safi	Morocco	99.5
Saidia	Morocco	98.7
Saint Louis	Senegal	92.9
Sale	Morocco	102.0
Settat	Morocco	98.9
Sidi Bounouara	Morocco	94.5
Sidi Ifni	Morocco	99.4
Sidi Slimane	Morocco	92.2
Skhirat	Morocco	99.8
Skhour Des Rehamna	Morocco	95.8
Smara	Morocco	95.4
Souk el Arbaa	Morocco	92.8
Bangui	Central African Republic	96.1
Ben Guerir	Morocco	94.4
Beni Mellal	Morocco	98.1
Benslimane	Morocco	91.8
Berrechid	Morocco	100.3
Bir Gandouz	Morocco	98.4
Bouarfa	Morocco	89.8
Boujdour	Morocco	102.0
Bou Craa	Morocco	98.9
Boumalne Dades	Morocco	100.2
Bouznika	Morocco	91.8
Brazzaville	Republic of the Congo	98.0
Bujumbura	Burundi	91.4
Moroni	Comoros	89.0

== See also ==
- Mass media in Morocco
