= Star Radio Malawi =

Star Radio Malawi is a private FM radio station in Malawi. Based in Blantyre, the station broadcasts across the country. It broadcasts on 88.7, 87.9, 94.4, 98.5 and 96.5 MHz
