= Khulumani FM =

Bulawayo; Zimbabwe
- Broadcast area: Bulawayo & Matabeleland
- Frequency: FM 95.0 MHz

Programming
- Language: English; Ndebele; Xhosa; Kalanga; Venda; Sotho; Tonga
- Format: Talk radio, Adult hits

Ownership
- Owner: ZBC
- Sister stations: Power FM; Classic 263; Radio Zimbabwe; 95.8 Central Radio; National FM

History
- First air date: 2 March 2018

Links
- Webcast: Listen Live
- Website: www.khulumanifm.co.zw

Khulumani FM, also known as KFM95.0 is a regional radio station that broadcasts from the city of Bulawayo in Matabeleland region.

In January 2018, the information ministry under the late former minister, Simon Khaya Moyo announced the launch of the new radio station in Zimbabwe’s second largest city and the station was successfully launched on March 2, 2018, becoming Zimbabwe’s first state owned regional radio station, only to be followed by the Gweru based 95.8 Central Radio in July of the same year. It caters for the audiences in the Bulawayo metropolitan province and parts of Matabeleland region within a 60 km radius. The station is based in ZBC's Montrose Studios in Bulawayo.

The station was positively welcomed by Bulawayo residents, artists, and businesses as an additional flavour to complement the commercial radio station Skyz Metro FM in the same city. It broadcasts in 7 languages, namely English, Ndebele, Xhosa, Kalanga, Venda, Sotho and Tonga.

The station is fully owned, operated, and controlled by the state broadcaster. It is focused on informing, entertaining, and educating its audience and has gained a huge following since launch, and most of its programming is informative, with notable highly interactive talk shows. The news bulletins are broadcast in 6 languages found in the Matabeleland region as well as in English.

The music playlist is predominantly Nguni from Matabeleland region, South Africa and Eswatini. The station aims to promote local artists within the region. Music from across Africa and the rest of the world, especially pop, RnB, country and reggae is also included.
