= Kudu FM =

Windhoek; Namibia
- Frequency: 103.5 MHz

Programming
- Format: Hot AC

Ownership
- Owner: Future Media Group
- Sister stations: Radiowave 96.7, Fresh FM

History
- First air date: 30 November 1998

Technical information
- Translator: Walvis Bay 95.1 Swakopmund 94.3 Oshakati 95.5 Rehoboth 103.5 Katima Mulilo 107.4 Rundu 92.7

Links
- Website: https://jacc.com.na/

Kudu FM was a radio station based in Windhoek, Namibia. It went on air since for the first time on 30 November 1998, broadcasting nationally. In 2017, the radio station relaunched as JACC, with a music-only format designed to appeal to mature adults in Namibia. JACC moved to digital streaming-only in 2020, and the station's FM broadcasting was rebranded to Nova 103.5 - a bilingual soft AC station.
