= RTP África (radio) =

Portugal-based radio station

- Portugal; Cape Verde, Guinea-Bissau, Mozambique and São Tomé and Príncipe
- Broadcast area: Portugal and Lusophone Africa

Programming
- Format: Ethnic/Africa

Ownership
- Owner: Rádio e Televisão de Portugal

History
- First air date: 1 April 1996; 30 years ago
- Former names: RDP África (1996-2026)

Links
- Webcast: RTP Play
- Website: RTP África

RTP África is a terrestrial radio station owned by Rádio e Televisão de Portugal broadcasting to Lusophone African countries with programming such as Lusophone African music, as well as Portuguese music and Brazilian music, with update reports from the Lusophone African recording world.

The station broadcasts on FM in Portugal (Lisboa 101.5 MHz, Coimbra 103.4 MHz and Faro 99.1 MHz), but also on most African Portuguese-speaking countries: Cape Verde, Guinea-Bissau, Mozambique, and São Tomé and Príncipe.

RDP África was introduced to Lusophone Africa when RDP Internacional stopped its broadcast on 6 January 1998 and launched RDP África the next day. The radio station also serves the Portuguese populations of Lusophone Africa and African populations of both black, white, and mulatto blood of Portugal.

RDP África logo from 2004 to 2016.

== History ==
Before the creation of RDP África, RDP created an opt-out service called Canal África in 1994. The service was catering Portugal and the Lusophone countries of Africa, with the exception of Angola due to laws banning foreign broadcasts in the country.

RDP África became its own service on 1 April 1996, airing a 17-hour schedule, with David Borges as its first director. The service later extended its schedule to 20 hours, from 5am to 1am. The downtime was filled by a simulcast of Antena 1 due to the lack of resources to produce an overnight schedule.

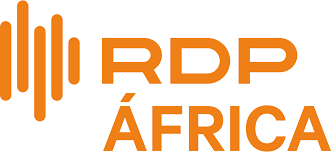
Final logo as RDP África, used from 2016 to 29 March 2026

For its twelfth anniversary in 2008, RDP África made a special 12-hour broadcast from the Campo Grande subway station, with 12 invitees.

On 30 March 2026, the station has been renamed as RTP África, matching the television channel of the same name, after the adoption of a single branding strategy on 18 February 2026. Some of its staff feared job losses as the television channel and the radio station were now put under the same branding. The rebranding is designed by Ivity Brand Corp, a Portuguese design agency responsible for RTP corporate rebrand.
