= Skyz Metro FM =

Bulawayo; Zimbabwe
- Broadcast area: Bulawayo & Matabeleland
- Frequencies: FM 94.1 MHz; FM 100.3 MHz

Programming
- Language: English; Ndebele; Shona
- Format: Adult contemporary, Talk

Ownership
- Owner: Fairtalk Communications
- Sister stations: Breeze FM 91.2

History
- First air date: 11 September 2016

Technical information
- Licensing authority: BAZ

Links
- Webcast: Listen live
- Website: skyzmetroradio.co.zw

Skyz Metro FM is a commercial radio station based in the metropolitan province of Bulawayo, Zimbabwe.

== Description ==
The station began broadcasting in September 2016 in Bulawayo on FM 100.3 MHz and further at a 60 km - 80 km radius around the city, making it the first radio station for and broadcasting from Zimbabwe's second largest city since the country gained independence in 1980.

In 2020, Skyz Metro FM was reported to be on a mission to expand its coverage to the greater parts of Matabeleland region and is now accessible in areas including Gwanda, Filabusi, Fort Rixon, Avoca, Khami, Esibomvu, Shangani, Matopo, Lochard, Mulungwane, Nyamandlovu, Redbank, Greystone, Collen Bawn and Ntabazinduna to mention a few. This move was applauded by communities of Matabeleland, especially the artists that expressed marginalisation by the national radio stations.

Most of its radio shows are mainly broadcast in iSiNdebele and English. Musically, the station gives greater air play to the Matabeleland artists, but also adds a mixture of other genres mostly the Nguni music from South Africa, Eswatini as well as some international hits from the US, Jamaica and the UK among other countries. It has played a huge role since its establishment by providing an alternative voice for the people in the area through its interactive talk shows engaging the city council, the police, government organisations, churches and many other organisations and institutions on issues affecting the community and the region. It also provides news from the region, documentaries and radio dramas. It broadcasts to the estimated audience of more than 1 million.

The establishment of Khulumani FM in March 2018 by the state broadcaster gave Bulawayo people an additional flavour to complement Skyz Metro FM, though others felt that Khulumani FM was launched to compete with and/or to destruct Skyz Metro FM. Some media critics from other regions accused the two Bulawayo radio stations for sounding more like South African radio stations due to the use of Matabeleland languages that include iSiNdebele, iSiXhosa, SeTswana and SeSotho among others, and also by heavily playing music by the Nguni people.
