= Shems FM =

Tunisia
- Broadcast area: Tunisia

Ownership
- Owner: Cyrine Ben Ali Mabrouk

History
- First air date: September 27, 2010

Links
- Website: Shems FM

Shems FM (Arabic: شمس أف أم) is the fourth-launched private radio station in Tunisia. It was launched on September 27, 2010, by 12 p.m. local time and it is owned by Cyrine Ben Ali Mabrouk, the daughter of Zine el-Abidine Ben Ali -the former president of Tunisia- and the wife of prominent businessman Marouen Mabrouk. It includes a team of 30 radio show hosts. Shems FM was fully or partially funded by the Tunisian Government.

== Key people ==
- Fathi Bhoury, Director General
- Lotfi Zeghdana, Deputy Director
- Amel Smaoui, Head of Programming

== See also ==
- Express FM
