= Power FM Zimbabwe =

- Harare; Zimbabwe
- Broadcast area: Zimbabwe
- Frequency: FM 99.6 MHz in Bulawayo

Programming
- Language: English
- Format: Urban contemporary

Ownership
- Owner: ZBC
- Sister stations: Khulumani FM; Radio Zimbabwe; 95.8 Central Radio; Classic 263; National FM

Links
- Webcast: Listen Live
- Website: www.powerfm.co.zw

Power FM is a Zimbabwean state owned urban music radio station that broadcasts nationwide on FM. It was previously known as Radio 3 and later 3FM. It was established to cater for the urban grooves artists by the then Minister of Information Jonathan Moyo.

The station was set up soon after the country got its independence in 1980 to cater for the urban youth. When it launched, it was broadcasting for 19 hours a day. It became a 24 hour station in the late 90s.

The station was renamed to Power FM in 2004, at the time when it was broadcasting 100% Zimbabwean music, a law that was enforced by the former Zimbabwe's Information and Broadcasting minister, Jonathan Moyo. Many Zimbabweans still criticise the former minister for dismantling the station and changing the format and names of all 4 national radio stations and the country's only TV station at the time. The sudden change of policies, which took place in 2002 saw the departure of many of Zimbabwe's finest broadcasting talents in all ZBC's stations.

Some Power FM legends like Kudzi 'Mr Cool' Marudza, Witness 'Chuman' Matema and Kennedy 'Kaycee The Gig Master' Masawi returned to the national broadcaster, but on the sister station Classic 263. Other legends like Kelvin Sifelani, George Munetsi, the late great Peter 'The Radio Driver' Johns and many others never returned.

On May 2, 2020, history was made in Zimbabwe when the 3 national urban radio stations, Star FM, ZiFM Stereo and Power FM multicasted the tribute to the late veteran broadcaster, Peter Johns, The Radio Driver. Power FM was the home of Johns before he relocated to London, UK is 2002.

It broadcasts mainly from the country's capital, Harare as well as the country's second capital, Bulawayo. It is accessible throughout the country on Frequency Modulation, and across the world via online streaming on various platforms. It is notable for pioneering the local music genre known as Urban Grooves, which is the country's local youth orientated pop music.

The station's main target audience is the urban youth, and its music library consists of a mixture of urban Zimbabwean genres and music from across the globe. Most popular music genres found in the station include pop, old school, house, reggae, dancehall and most notably the local Urban Grooves and Zim Dancehall.
