= Rhodesian Broadcasting Corporation =

State broadcaster of Rhodesia

- Type: Radio network and television network
- Country: Southern Rhodesia (1964-1965); Rhodesia (1965-1979); Zimbabwe Rhodesia (1979)
- Availability: National
- Founded: 1 January 1964
- Headquarters: Salisbury, Rhodesia
- Broadcast area: Rhodesia
- Owner: Government of Rhodesia (1964-1979); Government of Zimbabwe Rhodesia (1979)
- Key people: J. M. Helliwell
- Dissolved: 1979
- Replaced by: Zimbabwe Rhodesia Broadcasting Corporation

The Rhodesian Broadcasting Corporation (RBC), also referred to as the Rhodesia Broadcasting Corporation, was the state radio and television broadcaster of Southern Rhodesia and later Rhodesia. It was established on 1 January 1964 after the break-up of the Federation of Rhodesia and Nyasaland, when the former federal broadcasting system was divided among the federation's successor territories.

The RBC operated radio services for white and black audiences, regional and community radio stations, and television services. During the period of Unilateral Declaration of Independence (UDI) and the Rhodesian Bush War, it functioned as the official broadcaster of the white-minority government and was used to promote the Rhodesian state's political message.

In 1979, following the creation of Zimbabwe Rhodesia, the broadcaster was renamed the Zimbabwe Rhodesia Broadcasting Corporation (ZRBC). On 28 March 1980, shortly before internationally recognised independence, the word "Rhodesia" was dropped from the broadcaster's name and it became the Zimbabwe Broadcasting Corporation (ZBC).

== Background ==
Radio broadcasting in Southern Rhodesia developed before the creation of the RBC. The first professional broadcasting service in the territory was the Southern Rhodesia Broadcasting Service (SRBS), established in 1941 to serve the colony's white population. A separate Central African Broadcasting Station (CABS), based in Lusaka, broadcast to African audiences in Southern Rhodesia, Northern Rhodesia and Nyasaland.

After the creation of the Federation of Rhodesia and Nyasaland in 1953, the SRBS became part of the Federal Broadcasting Service. In 1958, the Federal Broadcasting Service and CABS were combined into the Federal Broadcasting Corporation of Rhodesia and Nyasaland (FBC), which served the three territories of the federation.

The federation was dissolved at the end of 1963. Separate broadcasting corporations were then created in the three territories, and the Rhodesia Broadcasting Corporation came into existence in Southern Rhodesia on 1 January 1964.

== Formation ==
The RBC inherited facilities and broadcasting practices from the federal system. A 2009 survey of public broadcasting in Zimbabwe states that the corporation inherited "not only old equipment" but also a system that had been controlled by colonial and white-minority governments. Broadcasting was organised in a racially stratified manner, with different services aimed at different audiences.

The corporation was the sole legal broadcaster in Rhodesia. Its status as a state broadcaster placed it under the influence of the Rhodesian government, especially after the rise of the Rhodesian Front and the intensification of political conflict in the 1960s.

== Radio services ==
The RBC operated a number of radio services. Its English-language service, often called the General Service or National Network, was aimed largely at the white population. The African Service broadcast in English and African languages, including Shona and Ndebele.

The corporation also developed local and regional stations. These included Radio Jacaranda in Salisbury, Radio Manica in Umtali, Radio Matopos in Bulawayo, and Radio Mthwakazi, an Ndebele-language service based in Bulawayo. Moyo states that these services were not community radio in the later participatory sense, but were decentralised state-broadcasting outlets whose organisation reflected the political and racial structure of Rhodesian society.

== Television ==
Television broadcasting in Rhodesia began before the creation of the RBC. Rhodesia Television (RTV), a private company, began transmissions in Salisbury in 1960 while broadcasting was still organised under the federal system. The service was initially available mainly in Salisbury and Bulawayo and was funded by advertising and licence fees.

After the dissolution of the federation, the Rhodesian government sought greater control over television through the RBC. The RBC acquired a controlling interest in RTV, and television was later incorporated into the state broadcasting system. Television reception remained concentrated in urban areas and among white viewers for much of the RBC period.

== Shortwave service ==
Shortwave broadcasting was an important part of Rhodesian radio before and during the RBC period. Under the Federal Broadcasting Corporation of Rhodesia and Nyasaland, a 10 kW shortwave transmitter at Gwelo was opened in 1960 to serve the whole of Southern Rhodesia as part of the African Service. The transmitter operated in the 60-metre band during the morning and evening and in the 31-metre band during the afternoon. Its programmes originated from studios in Harari, Salisbury, and Luveve, Bulawayo, and were carried by landline to the transmitters. These facilities became part of the broadcasting infrastructure inherited by the RBC after the dissolution of the Federation.

The RBC used shortwave to reach listeners beyond the more reliable coverage of urban medium-wave and FM transmitters. Its broadcasts were also heard outside Rhodesia. A study of radio listening in Zambia during the 1970s found that in rural Southern Province, which bordered Rhodesia and the Caprivi Strip, the Rhodesia Broadcasting Corporation had good reception and attracted 24 per cent of listeners, almost equalling the Zambia Broadcasting Services audience in that area.

Shortwave also became part of the propaganda conflict of the Rhodesian Bush War. While the RBC carried the Rhodesian government's domestic and regional message, nationalist movements used broadcasts from neighbouring countries to reach listeners inside Rhodesia. Last Moyo identifies ZAPU's Voice of the Revolution and ZANU's Voice of Zimbabwe as externally based stations broadcasting from sympathetic African states such as Zambia and Mozambique. Veteran Zimbabwean broadcaster John Masuku later recalled that liberation-movement broadcasts from Lusaka and Maputo were heard in Rhodesia on shortwave and medium wave, and that radio played an important role in mobilising support for the independence struggle.

Surviving off-air recordings of RBC shortwave broadcasts from the 1970s are held by the Shortwave Radio Audio Archive.

== UDI and government control ==
The political role of the RBC increased after Rhodesia's Unilateral Declaration of Independence in November 1965. The Rhodesian Front government of Ian Smith placed heavy emphasis on controlling information and countering criticism from Britain, African nationalist movements and international broadcasters.

RBC was a central instrument of Rhodesian state propaganda. The broadcaster presented the Rhodesian government's version of events, promoted white-minority rule as stable and orderly, and framed African nationalist movements and external critics as hostile or communist-influenced.

The RBC also became part of a wider broadcasting conflict in southern Africa. The British government and the BBC attempted to reach Rhodesian listeners after UDI, while the Rhodesian government sought to limit or counter hostile foreign broadcasts. During the same period, African nationalist movements increasingly used shortwave broadcasting from neighbouring countries to reach listeners inside Rhodesia.

== Rhodesian Bush War ==
During the Rhodesian Bush War, radio was an important political and military medium. The Rhodesian state used the RBC to reinforce government messages, while nationalist movements used external and clandestine radio services to reach black listeners inside the country.

The Zimbabwe African People's Union (ZAPU) operated the Voice of the Revolution and the Zimbabwe African National Union (ZANU) operated the Voice of Zimbabwe. These stations broadcast from sympathetic neighbouring states, including Zambia and Mozambique, and sought to mobilise anti-colonial resistance.

The Rhodesian government responded partly by expanding FM broadcasting and by encouraging or distributing FM-only receivers in rural areas. This made it easier for listeners to receive RBC programming while limiting access to shortwave broadcasts from outside Rhodesia.

== Zimbabwe Rhodesia and transition to independence ==
In 1979, under the Internal Settlement, Rhodesia was renamed Zimbabwe Rhodesia and the state broadcaster was renamed the Zimbabwe Rhodesia Broadcasting Corporation (ZRBC). The new name reflected the transitional government of Abel Muzorewa, although that government did not receive broad international recognition.

Following the Lancaster House Agreement, the territory temporarily returned to British authority as Southern Rhodesia under Governor Christopher Soames. The broadcaster retained the Zimbabwe Rhodesia Broadcasting Corporation name during this transitional period.

On 28 March 1980, three weeks before independence, the broadcaster changed its name from Zimbabwe Rhodesia Broadcasting Corporation to Zimbabwe Broadcasting Corporation. At independence on 18 April 1980, the ZBC became the national broadcaster of the new state of Zimbabwe.

== Legacy ==
The RBC was the predecessor of the Zimbabwe Broadcasting Corporation. Its institutional structure, monopoly status and state-oriented broadcasting culture influenced post-independence broadcasting in Zimbabwe. The 2009 public-broadcasting survey argues that the ZBC inherited a system historically controlled by colonial and white-minority governments and remained a state-controlled broadcaster after independence.

The RBC period is also significant in the history of broadcasting and propaganda in southern Africa. Scholars have described its output as part of the Rhodesian Front government's effort to maintain white-minority rule, counter international criticism and undermine African nationalist movements.

== See also ==
- Media of Zimbabwe
- Radio Freedom
- Rhodesia Television
- Rhodesian Bush War
- Unilateral Declaration of Independence (Rhodesia)
- Zimbabwe Broadcasting Corporation
