= Metro FM (Ghana) =

Radio station in Kumasi, Ghana

Programming
- Languages: English and Twi
- Format: Urban music, sports

History
- First air date: 2012

Links
- Website: metrofmonline.com

Metro FM (94.1 MHz) is a privately owned radio station in Kumasi, the Ashanti Regional capital, Ghana. Established in 2012 by a young entrepreneur, Mr. Deen Samson. The station is formatted to mostly play urban music genres such as Highlife, Hiplife, Hip Hop, and R&B along with minority of its airtime dedicated to talk shows. Majority of its talk show time is sports. The station's core languages are English and Twi.

Metro FM has other subsidiaries such as Metro FM Online which on which the station streams live, Metro Market which is intended to be the online classifieds, Metro News, Metro Sports, etc.

Key presenters include PJ Moze, formerly of Multimedia Broadcasting.
