= Radio 2 (Ghana) =

Accra; Ghana
- Broadcast area: Greater Accra Region

Programming
- Languages: English, French
- Format: Local news, talk and music

Ownership
- Owner: Ghana Broadcasting Corporation

Links
- Website: www.gbcghanaonline.com

Radio 2 is a public radio station in Accra, the capital town of the Greater Accra Region of Ghana. The station is owned and run by the state broadcaster - the Ghana Broadcasting Corporation (GBC). The station is one of two national stations run by GBC. The station is the commercial service of the broadcasting house. It broadcasts all its programmes in English.
