= Zimbabwe Broadcasting Corporation =

State-controlled broadcaster in Zimbabwe

- Type: Television network Radio network
- Country: Zimbabwe
- Availability: National; Worldwide
- Owner: Government of Zimbabwe
- Launch date: 1963 (as Rhodesian Broadcasting Corporation)
- Former names: Rhodesian Broadcasting Corporation, and later Zimbabwe Rhodesian Broadcasting Corporation
- Official website: http://www.zbc.co.zw

The Zimbabwe Broadcasting Corporation (ZBC) is the state-owned broadcaster in Zimbabwe. It was established as the Rhodesian Broadcasting Corporation (RBC), taking its current name in 1980. Like the RBC before it, the ZBC has been accused of being a government mouthpiece with no editorial independence.

== History ==
=== Introduction of radio ===
Radio was first introduced in the then Southern Rhodesia in 1933, in Belvedere in Salisbury by Imperial Airways, which was used to provide radio guidance and weather reports. However, it was not until 1941 that the first professional broadcaster was established. This was known as the Southern Rhodesia Broadcasting Service (SRBS), and was established to meet the needs of the colony's white population. The same year, a second broadcaster, the Central African Broadcasting Station (CABS), was established, which had responsibility for broadcasting to African audiences in Northern Rhodesia (now Zambia) and Nyasaland (now Malawi) as well as Southern Rhodesia.

Following the creation of the Federation of Rhodesia and Nyasaland in 1953, the SRBS was renamed the Federal Broadcasting Service (FBS). The CABS, still based in Lusaka, continued to use African languages as well as English. In 1955, a Federal Commission of Enquiry into the organisation of broadcasting in the Federation proposed the creation of a new broadcasting organisation, to be called the "Rhodesia and Nyasaland Broadcasting Corporation", which was to be established in 1956. However, it was not until 1958 that the FBS and CABS would be merged into the Federal Broadcasting Corporation of Rhodesia and Nyasaland (FBC).

When the Federation was dissolved in 1963, the FBC was disbanded, and each territory acquired its own broadcasting service, which in Southern Rhodesia was initially known as the Southern Rhodesian Broadcasting Corporation (SRBC). This later became known as the Rhodesian Broadcasting Corporation (RBC).

=== Introduction of television ===
Television was introduced on 14 November 1960, first in Salisbury, with transmissions in Bulawayo beginning seven months later. It was only the second such service in sub-Saharan Africa after Nigeria, and the first such service in Southern Africa, as South Africa did not introduce television until 1976.

It was initially operated by a private company, Rhodesia Television (RTV) on behalf of the then FBC, with its major shareholder being South African companies, including the Argus Group of newspapers, through its subsidiary, the Rhodesian Printing and Publishing Company, and also served Northern Rhodesia until its independence as Zambia. Other companies included Davenport and Meyer, the latter of which operated LM Radio, based in Mozambique, then under Portuguese rule.

Following the dissolution of the FBC in 1964, the Government of Southern Rhodesia attempted to take control of RTV through the RBC, whose chairman, J.M. Helliwell, announced that the RBC would acquire all shares in RTV, "at a price agreed upon by both parties". This prompted criticism by MPs, one of whom, Vernon Brelsford, moved a motion in the Legislative Assembly deploring the proposed acquisition. He asked: "Does it actually run the programmes to make sure that only its point of view is put over and no one else's is?". Prime Minister Ian Smith argued that control of television was necessary for "winning the war for the minds of men", and would save it from falling into the hands of "communist sympathisers".

However, the government's move was rejected by RTV's directors. Instead, the RBC initially acquired a 51 per cent stake in the service, which became part of the RBC in 1976. RBC TV was funded by advertising and a television licence fee. Television reception was confined mainly to the cities and largest towns, and most viewers were whites. Umtali (now Mutare) only received television in 1972, by which time it was estimated that more than 90 per cent of the white population had access to the service. By 1973, RTV was broadcasting 42 hours a week from three transmitters, and 61,716 combined radio and television licences had been issued.

=== Unilateral Declaration of Independence ===
In November 1965, the white minority government of Ian Smith issued a Unilateral Declaration of Independence, under which censorship of broadcasting and the press was imposed, and key posts at the RBC were gradually filled by supporters of the ruling Rhodesian Front party. The previous year, the Deputy Minister of Information, P. K. van der Byl, described the aims of his Ministry as "not merely to disseminate information from an interesting point of view but to play its part in fighting the propaganda battle on behalf of the country". In response, the RBC Director General, James Neill, resigned, citing political interference.

On 1 January 1965, the RBC had ceased to relay the morning world news bulletin from the BBC, and replaced it with a bulletin from the South African Broadcasting Corporation (SABC). However, afternoon and evening news relays of the BBC remained unchanged.

The British Government, which had denounced UDI as illegal, began broadcasting BBC programmes into Rhodesia by building a radio relay station in Francistown, in the then Bechuanaland Protectorate, now Botswana. The Rhodesian Government retaliated by clandestinely building a 400,000 watt transmitter nicknamed "Big Bertha", in order to jam the signal from the smaller BBC transmitter. Programmes about Rhodesia were subjected to jamming, but other programmes were not affected. In 1968, the BBC ceased broadcasting from Francistown, and the relay station was transferred to the Government of Botswana.

Speaking at the opening of the new RBC Centre in Pocket Hill in 1970, President Clifford Dupont said that few other countries had been subject "to such a barrage of hostile propaganda over the air", and that the new centre would contribute to the RBC's very successful role "in combatting this insidious offensive".

The RBC operated two main services, the English-language General Service (or National Network), aimed at the white audience, and the African Service, broadcasting in English, Shona and Ndebele, aimed at black listeners. The RBC also established three community stations with a multi-racial audience, Radio Jacaranda (Salisbury), Radio Matopos (Bulawayo) and Radio Manica (Umtali). In 1975, an Ndebele language service operating out of Bulawayo, known as Radio Mthwakazi, was established, using the "Big Bertha" transmitter previously used to jam the BBC's broadcasts from Francistown.

As armed opposition to white minority rule mounted in the 1970s, Africans in Rhodesia increasingly began to turn to short wave radio broadcasts from neighbouring countries, which carried programmes from exiled nationalist movements, with the Zimbabwe African National Union's Voice of Zimbabwe operating from Mozambique, and the rival Zimbabwe African People's Union's Voice of the Revolution operating from Zambia.

In order to counter this, the RBC installed an FM network, while the government distributed FM-only receivers to chiefs and village headmen in the Tribal Trust Lands. It also ran campaigns promoting FM-only receivers, pointing out that they were exempt from the annual licence fee, and how short wave broadcasts were affected by static noise and required retuning between frequencies throughout the day.

=== Transition to independence ===
In 1979, following the adoption of a new constitution, Rhodesia was renamed Zimbabwe Rhodesia, and in common with other state institutions which were renamed, the state broadcaster was renamed the Zimbabwe Rhodesia Broadcasting Corporation (ZRBC) under an amendment to the Broadcasting Act. It also used the name "Voice of Zimbabwe Rhodesia" (VZR) on air. In addition, the change of name saw the debut of Mandy Mundawarara, the country's first black television newsreader, whose father, Silas Mundawarara, had become Deputy Prime Minister in the government of Abel Muzorewa.

However, the Muzorewa government did not gain international recognition, and under the terms of the Lancaster House Agreement, the country officially reverted to British rule in December 1979 as Southern Rhodesia, with Lord Soames as governor. Despite this, the ZRBC's name remained unchanged. It was only on 28 March 1980, three weeks before independence, that the word "Rhodesia" was finally dropped from the corporation's title, and it adopted its present name, "Zimbabwe Broadcasting Corporation".

A number of other senior BBC staff were sent to the country to advise Lord Soames on election broadcasting, and also help the ZRBC with their preparations for independence. In the run-up to elections being held in February 1980, the Governor's Information Adviser held discussions with the ZRBC, leading the Election Commissioner agreed to a scheme to ensure that all parties standing in the elections should have equal free time on the public media.

== Post-independence ==
=== Reorganisation of services ===
Following independence, radio services were reorganised, with three distinct networks being established: Radio One, the main English-language network, run by Africans but with some whites in key positions, Radio Two, combining the Harare and Radio Mthwakazi services and broadcasting in Shona and Ndebele, and Radio Three a completely new concept broadcasting to the under 45's across all races, headed by Jill Baker and with all races disc jockeys presenting news updates, interviews and music from top of the pops to all genres of African music. It was enormously popular threatening to steal listenership from the other stations. Well loved disc jockeys included Josh Makawa, Mandy Mundawarara, Mike Mills, Busi Mhlanga, Keith Lindsay, Roy Brassington, John Matinde, Wellington Mbofana and Trish Johns. Radio Four was established in 1982, as an educational channel.

The legacy of economic sanctions meant that ZBC inherited antiquated equipment with spares difficult to obtain, as manufacturers no longer produced black and white television transmission equipment. In addition, the television service, now known as ZTV, only reached only 32 percent of the country's territory.

The conversion to colour television began in late 1982, using the PAL B system. By this time, those with colour receivers could already watch imported programmes produced in colour. Colour transmissions were finally introduced in 1984. As much of the machinery had been in used for over two decades, and was now obsolete, it proved more economical to buy entirely new equipment than to replace it. A second television channel, available only in Harare, was introduced in 1986.

By the end of the 1990s, ZBC's shortwave transmitters bought from Technology for Communications International in 1994 worth $40 million were now considered obsolete, triggering a parliamentary investigation that would culminate in the prosecution of a senior politician and ZBC officials responsible for sanctioning the purchase.

ZBC planned to introduce a subscription television service as early as 1993, but due to government and funding issues, the project was scrapped in 2000.

ZBC relaunched on 30 November 2001 following the signing of a new Broadcasting Act in April of the same year. The corporation was now divided into six strategic business units: Newsnet, Kidznet, Sportsnet, Radio Services, Production Services and Television Services.

On 27 May 2025, President Emmerson Mnangagwa signed into law an amendment into the Broadcasting Services Act requiring motorists to pay a radio tax funding the ZBC in order to obtain a driver's licence and vehicle registration.

=== Local programming ===
At independence, 30 per cent of television programming was locally produced. By late 1982, local programmes accounted for 40 per cent of output. While some programming was in Shona and Ndebele, 80 per cent of programming was in English, of which most was imported, mainly from the US, Britain and Australia. Despite this reliance on foreign content, in the 1980s, the locally produced drama The Mukadota Family became the most popular programme in the country. Other locally produced programmes included the Shona language drama Gringo Ndiani?, the video music show Mutinhimira weMimhanzi, later known as Ezomgido, the talk show Madzinza e Zimbabwe, dealing with traditional culture, and Psalmody, a Sunday morning gospel music programme.

=== Accusations of pro-government bias ===
As the 1957 Broadcasting Act remained in force, ZBC inherited RBC's state monopoly on broadcasting, remaining accountable to the country's Minister of Information. In a reflection of the new ZANU PF government's political leanings, Robert Mugabe, previously described only as "a terrorist leader", was now described as "Comrade Prime Minister". In addition, most of the white staff left ZBC after independence, and many of the black staff who replaced them had previously worked in for radio services operated by the nationalist movements from exile in Zambia and Mozambique.

Those white journalists remaining came under pressure not to give coverage to certain topics that detracted from the new state's socialist outlook, including unrest in Poland, then under communist rule, the British royal family and the late Chinese communist leader Mao Tse-tung, with those objecting being dismissed, including Derek Sones, who in 1981 was denounced by his editor, Grey Tichatonga as a "good desk-man for a colonialist capitalist news organisation" and an 'unregenerated and unrehabilitated colonialist who was unable to change his ideas to fit in with socialist and revolutionary ZBC". However, black ZBC journalists also faced government interference in their work; in 1989, two were suspended after interviewing an academic, Kempton Makamure, who was critical of the government's investment policies.

The ZBC was also accused of giving more emphasis to the role of Mugabe's Zimbabwe African National Liberation Army (ZANLA) in the fight for independence, and ignoring the role of Joshua Nkomo's rival Zimbabwe People's Revolutionary Army (ZIPRA). In 1997, it was revealed that the ZBC had destroyed archive film of ZIPRA taken during the war. Expressing his dislike of independent broadcasting in 1995, Mugabe remarked "you do not know what propaganda a non-state radio station might broadcast". Despite this, the government announced that the ZBC monopoly on broadcasting would be abolished by the end of 1997. Consequently, the ZBC's second TV channel was discontinued and replaced by Joy TV, the country's first independent channel, which operated on a lease agreement with the ZBC. This channel lasted until 2002, when it was controversially taken off the air for allegedly violating the Broadcasting Services Act.

During the 2002 presidential elections, the nightly news bulletin Newshour gave extensive coverage to the rallies of the ruling party, amounting to a quarter of airtime. In 2003, a study conducted by the Media Monitoring Project of Zimbabwe (MMPZ) in 2003 showed that one of the propaganda jingles, Rambai Makashinga or "Continue Persevering", was being played 288 times a day on the four ZBC radio stations, and 72 times a day on ZBC television. In 2008, it found that 90 percent of the ZBC's bulletins during the March elections were devoted to positive coverage of ZANU-PF, while in both the March and June elections, it dedicated 200 hours of coverage to ZANU-PF but just over 16 to the opposition Movement for Democratic Change (MDC), most of which was negative.

In 2015, Freedom House described ZBC coverage as overwhelmingly favouring ZANU-PF.

== Radio ==
ZBC has six radio networks, which are;

- National FM - broadcasting news and current affairs in various indigenous languages,
- Radio Zimbabwe - broadcasts only in Shona and Ndebele,
- Power Fm (formerly Radio 3 / 3FM) - broadcasting pop music,
- Classic 263 (formerly Spot FM or SFM) - carrying sports, news and current affairs
- Khulumani FM - station designed for the metropolitan province of Bulawayo and Matabeleland region
- 95.8 Central Radio - broadcasting for Gweru.

Local radio stations run hourly news bulletins which range from two minutes to the longest being a ten-minute bulletin on weekends and holidays. Presenters include, Admire Mhungu, Innocent Manyenga, Memory Chamisa and Keith Mawoyo.

On the national languages desk readers include Nqobile Malinga, Patience Machokoto, Taboka Ncube, Faith Nare, Lucy Ngosolo and Caroline Sithole. Bulletins come out live on Classic 263 at 7 am, 8 am, 1 pm, 6 pm and 8 pm and running from Monday to Friday. The anchors are Nomalanga Vuma, Theophilus Chuma, Ian Zvoma, Butler Nhepure and Jonathan Marerwa.

== Television ==
ZBC's television service now consists of a single channel, known as ZBC TV. The ZBC re-established a second TV channel of its own, Channel 2, in April 2010, but this station was decommissioned in August 2015. On 28 April 2022, ZBC launched Zimbabwe's first youth-oriented television channel, Jive TV.

News bulletins include the morning Good Morning Zimbabwe, produced by Admire Mhungu, lunchtime news, Nhau Indaba and News Hour. Rumbidzai Takawira, the anchor, is usually the host of News Hour.

Battle of the Chefs is one of the first food-related reality TV shows to air on ZBC.

== See also ==
- Media of Zimbabwe
- Communications in Zimbabwe
