= Radio Zimbabwe =

Zimbabwe
- Broadcast area: Zimbabwe
- Frequency: 96.3 MHz in Bulawayo

Programming
- Language: Ndebele & Shona
- Format: Music; Talk

Ownership
- Owner: ZBC
- Sister stations: Khulumani FM; Power FM; 95.8 Central Radio; Classic 263; National FM

Links
- Webcast: Listen Live
- Website: www.radiozim.co.zw

Radio Zimbabwe, formerly Radio 2, is a Zimbabwean radio station that broadcasts in 2 widely spoken indigenous Zimbabwean languages, Ndebele and Shona and is owned by the country's national broadcaster.

It broadcasts talk shows, news, sports updates, cultural shows, health, music chat shows, and politics among other things. It also broadcasts live sports events as well as national events. It was once the largest in Zimbabwe by listenership, and the most accessible in the remote areas of the country. The station is known for playing mostly Zimbabwean traditional music and a mix of African music.

Until 2000, Radio Zimbabwe was a state-sanctioned monopoly. During the state broadcaster's policy changes in 2002 under the former information minister Jonathan Moyo, a number of broadcasters left the station and some left the country. The likes of Ezra 'Tshisa' Sibanda, Eric 'The General' Knight, Brenda Moyo and the late Pina Mwemba were forced to leave the station.

The station's slogan is Nepfenyuro Yevanhu (Shona) / Umsakazo Wabantu (Ndebele), which translate to The People's Broadcaster.
