= Classic 263 =

Zimbabwe
- Broadcast area: Zimbabwe
- Frequency: 90.0 MHz in Bulawayo

Programming
- Language: English
- Format: Talk radio; Adult hits

Ownership
- Owner: ZBC
- Sister stations: Khulumani FM; Power FM; 95.8 Central Radio; Radio Zimbabwe; National FM

Links
- Webcast: Listen Live
- Website: www.classic263.co.zw

Classic 263 (formerly Radio 1, and later Spot FM/SFM) is a Zimbabwean Talk radio station owned by the state-controlled Zimbabwe Broadcasting Corporation (ZBC) and is based at Pockets Hill Studios in Highlands, Harare. Its broadcasts are spoken in English, Ndebele, and Shona.

The station focuses on talk shows that address a variety of topics, including politics, current affairs, and sports. It also features music intended for a Zimbabwean audience. The station's slogan is: "Now we are talking."

== History ==
Classic 263 was originally established to serve the white community residing in urban and farming regions of Zimbabwe.

In 2001, the station changed its name from Radio 1 to Spot FM, which was abbreviated as SFM. Initially stationed in Bulawayo, it officially relocated to the capital, Harare.
