= List of government gazettes =

This is a list of government gazettes (also known as official gazettes, official journals, official newspapers, official monitors or official bulletins).

== Active publications for countries and dependencies ==
Country/region	Published Name (native)	English Name (translation)	Publication Began	Contents	Link
Afghanistan	رسمي جرېده (Pashto) جريدۀ رسمی (Dari)	Official Gazette			
Albania	Fletorja Zyrtare	Official Journal			
Algeria	الجريدة الرسمية للجزائر (Arabic) Journal Officiel de la République Algérienne Démocratique et Populaire (French)	Official Journal of the People's Democratic Republic of Algeria	July 1962	Statutes, Treaties, Ordinances, Decrees, Official Notices	
Andorra	Butlletí Oficial del Principat d'Andorra	Official Bulletin of the Principality of Andorra			
Angola	Diário da República	Journal of the Republic			
Antigua and Barbuda	Antigua and Barbuda Official Gazette		1981		
Antigua and Barbuda	Antigua and Barbuda Extraordinary Gazette				
Antigua and Barbuda	Antigua and Barbuda Supplementary Gazette				
Argentina	Boletín Oficial de la República Argentina	Official Bulletin of the Argentine Republic	July 1893	§1 – Legislation and Official Notices §2 – Corporate and Judicial Notices §3 – Recruitment §4 – Internet domains	
Armenia	Hayastani Hanrapetutyun (Հայաստանի Հանրապետություն)	Republic of Armenia			
Australia	Commonwealth of Australia Gazette		January 1901	Consists of various types: Government Notices; Special Notices; Periodic Notices; Australian Public Service	
Austria	Bundesgesetzblatt für die Republik Österreich	Federal Law Gazette for the Republic of Austria	November 1920	Statutes	
Azerbaijan	Azərbaycan	Azerbaijan			
Bahamas	Official Gazette Bahamas				
Bahrain	الجريدة الرسمية	Official Gazette			
Bangladesh	Bānglādēśa gējēṭa (বাংলাদেশ গেজেট)	The Bangladesh Gazette			
Barbados	Official Gazette				
Belgium	Belgisch Staatsblad / Moniteur belge / Belgisches Staatsblatt	Belgian Official Journal			
Bolivia	Gaceta Oficial Estado Plurinacional de Bolivia	Official Gazette Plurinational State of Bolivia			
Benin	Journal officiel de la République du Bénin	Official Gazette of the Republic of Benin			
Botswana	Government Gazette				
Brazil	Diário Oficial da União	Official Journal of the Union			
Bosnia and Herzegovina	Službeni glasnik Bosne i Hercegovine	Official Gazette of Bosnia and Herzegovina			
Brunei	Brunei Darussalam Government Gazette				
Bulgaria	Darzhaven Vestnik (Държавен вестник)	State Gazette			
Burundi	Journal officiel de Burundi	Official Journal of Burundi			
Cape Verde	Boletim Oficial	Official Bulletin			
Canada	The Canada Gazette / Gazette du Canada			Bilingual English–French side-by-side format; Electronic publication only since 2014; 3 parts	
Cayman Islands	Cayman Islands Gazette				
Chad	Journal officiel de la République du Tchad	Official Journal of the Republic of Chad			
Chile	Diario Oficial de la República de Chile	Official Journal of the Republic of Chile			
China	中华人民共和国国务院公报	People's Republic of China State Council Gazette		Administrative and ministerial regulations, policy papers, Official speeches, appointments by the State Council.	
China	中华人民共和国全国人民代表大会常务委员会公报	People's Republic of China National People's Congress Standing Committee Gazette		Laws, bills and legislative proceedings.	
China	中华人民共和国最高人民法院公报	Gazette of the Supreme People's Court of the People's Republic of China		Laws, judicial interpretations, appointments, policy papers, landmark cases.	
China	中华人民共和国最高人民检察院公报	Gazette of the Supreme People's Procuratorate of the People's Republic of China		Laws, prosecutorial judicial interpretations, appointments, policy papers, landmark cases.	
Colombia	Diario Oficial	Official Journal			
Congo-Brazzaville	Journal officiel de la République du Congo	Official Journal of the Republic of the Congo			
Congo-Kinshasa	Journal officiel de la République Democratique de Congo	Official Journal of the Democratic Republic of Congo			
Costa Rica	Diario Oficial La Gaceta	Official Journal The Gazette			
Côte d'Ivoire	Journal officiel de la République de Côte d'Ivoire	Official Journal of the Republic of Côte d'Ivoire			
Croatia	Narodne novine	People's Paper			
Cuba	Gaceta Oficial	Official Gazette			
Cyprus	Επίσημη Εφημερίδα της Κυπριακής Δημοκρατίας	Official Gazette of the Republic of Cyprus			
Czech Republic	Sbírka zákonů	Collection of Laws			
Denmark	Lovtidende	Law Tidings		Legislative	
Denmark	Statstidende	State Tidings		Executive	
Denmark	Kunngerðablaðið Føroya	Faeroer Proclamation Gazette			
Djibouti	Journal Officiel République de Djibouti	Government Gazette of the Republic of Djibouti			
Dominican Republic	Gaceta Oficial	Official Gazette			
Ecuador	Registro Oficial	Official Register			
Egypt	الجريدة الرسمية لجمهورية مصر العربية	Official Journal of the Arab Republic of Egypt			
Equatorial Guinea	Boletín Oficial del Estado	Official State Bulletin			
Eritrea	Gazette of Eritrean Laws				
Estonia	Riigi Teataja	State Journal			
Eswatini	Eswatini Government Gazette				
Ethiopia	Federal Negarit Gazeta	Federal Negarit Gazette			
Faroe Islands	Kunngerðablaðið	Announce Gazette			
Finland	Virallinen lehti / Officiella tidningen	Official Journal			
France	Journal officiel de la République française	Official Journal of the French Republic			
France	Journal officiel de la Polynesie française	Official Journal of the French Polynesia			
France	Journal officiel du Territoire de Wallis et Futuna	Official Journal of the Territory of Wallis and Futuna			
Georgia	sakartvelos sak’anonmdeblo matsne (საქართველოს საკანონმდებლო მაცნე)	Legislative Herald of Georgia			
Germany	Bundesgesetzblatt	Federal Law Gazette			
Germany	Bundesanzeiger	Federal Gazette			
Ghana	Ghana Gazette				
Greece	Efimeris tis Kyverniseos (Εφημερίς της Κυβερνήσεως)	Government Gazette			
Guatemala	Diario de Centro América	Journal of Central America			
Guernsey	La Gazette Officielle	The Official Gazette			
Guernsey	Alderney Official Gazette				
Guyana	The Official Gazette of Guyana				
Holy See	Acta Apostolicae Sedis	Register of the Apostolic See			
Honduras	La Gaceta	The Gazette			
Hungary	Magyar Közlöny	Official Gazette of Hungary			
Iceland	Lögbirtingablað	Legal Publication Paper		Executive and Judicial	
Iceland	Stjórnartíðindi	Administrative Tidings		Legislative and Executive	
India	The Gazette of India (भारत का राजपत्र)	The Gazette of India			
Indonesia	Lembaran Negara	State Gazette			
Iran	روزنامه رسمی جمهوری اسلامی ایران	Official Gazette of Iran			
Iraq	الوقائع العراقية	Official Gazette of Iraq			
Ireland	Iris Oifigiúil	Official Journal (Note: The name Iris Oifigiúil is the official name in English as well as Irish. Notices within it may be in either language.)			
Isle of Man	Isle of Man Legislation Newsletter				
Israel	Reshumot (רשומות)	Official Gazette			
Italy	Gazzetta Ufficiale della Repubblica Italiana	Official Gazette of the Italian Republic			
Japan	Kanpō (官報)	Official Paper			
Jersey	Jersey Gazette				
Jordan	الجريدة الرسمية للمملكة الاردنية الهاشمية	Official Gazette of the Hashemite Kingdom of Jordan			
Kenya	The Kenya Gazette				
Kiribati	Kiribati Gazettes				
Kosovo	Gazeta Zyrtare e Republikës së Kosovës / Sluzbeni List Republike Kosovo	Official Gazette of the Republic of Kosovo			
Kuwait	Al-Kuwait Al-Yawm (الكويت اليوم)	Kuwait Today			
Laos	chod mai hed thang lad thakan aehng s pp lav (ຈົດໝາຍເຫດທາງລັດຖະການ ແຫ່ງ ສປປ ລາວ)	Lao Official Gazette			
Latvia	Latvijas Vēstnesis	The Latvian Messenger			
Libya	الجريدة الرسمية الليبية	The Libyan official Gazette		The Law Society of Libya	
Liechtenstein	Landesgesetzblatt	National Law Gazette			
Luxembourg	Mémorial	Memorial			
Malawi	The Malawi Government Gazette				
Malaysia	Warta Kerajaan Persekutuan	Federal Government Gazette		Acts of parliament, subsidiary legislation, government notices	
Malaysia	Warta Kerajaan Sabah	Sabah State Government Gazette			
Maldives	ދިވެހިސަރުކާރުގެ ގެޒެޓް	Gazette of the Government of Maldives			
Mali	Journal Officiel de la République du Mali	Government Gazette of the Republic of Mali			
Malta	Gazzetta tal-Gvern ta' Malta / Malta Government Gazette				
Mauritania	Journal officiel de la République Islamique de Mauritanie	Official Journal of the Islamic Republic of Mauritania			
Mauritius	The Government Gazette of Mauritius				
Mexico	Diario Oficial de la Federación	Official Journal of the Federation			
Moldova	Monitorul Oficiul	Official Monitor			
Monaco	Journal de Monaco	Journal of Monaco			
Mongolia	Төрийн мэдээлэл	State Information Bulletin			
Morocco	Al-Jarida al-Rasmiyya (الجريدة الرسمية)	Official Bulletin			
Mozambique	Boletim da República	Bulletin of the Republic			
Myanmar	pyihtaunghcusammatamyanmarninengantaw pyan tam (ပြည်ထောင်စုသမ္မတမြန်မာနိုင်ငံတော်ပြန်တမ်)	Gazette of the Republic of the Union of Myanmar			
Namibia	Government Gazette of the Republic of Namibia				
Nauru	Republic of Nauru Government Gazette				
Nepal	Nepal Rajpatra (नेपाल राजपत्र)	Nepal Gazette	6 August 1951		
Netherlands	Staatsblad			Laws	
Netherlands	Staatscourant			Regulations	
Netherlands	Afkondingenblad van Aruba	Proclamation Gazette of Aruba			
Netherlands	Afkondingenblad van Sint Maarten	Proclamation Gazette of Sint Maarten			
New Zealand	New Zealand Gazette				
Nicaragua	La Gaceta	The Gazette			
Nigeria	Federal Republic of Nigeria Official Gazette				
North Macedonia	Služben vesnik na Republika Severna Makedonija (Службен весник на Република Северна Македонија)	Official Herald of the Republic of North Macedonia			
Norway	Norsk Lovtidend	Norwegian Law Gazette			
Norway	Norsk Lysingsblad				
Oman	al-Jaridah al-rasmiyah (الجريدة الرسمية)	The Official Gazette			
Pakistan	The Gazette of Pakistan				
Palestine	Al-Waqa’i Al-Palestiniani (لوقائع الفلسطينية)	Official Gazette of the State of Palestine			
Papua New Guinea	Government Gazette				
Peru	Diario Oficial El Peruano	The Peruvian Official Journal			
Philippines	Official Gazette				
Poland	Dziennik Ustaw Rzeczypospolitej Polskiej	Journal of Laws of the Republic of Poland			
Poland	Monitor Polski	Official Gazette of the Republic of Poland			
Portugal	Diário da República	Journal of the Republic			
Qatar	Al Meezan	Official Gazette			
Romania	Monitorul Oficial al României	Official Monitor of Romania			
Rwanda	Official Gazette of the Republic of Rwanda / Journal Officiel de la République du Rwanda / Igazeti ya Leta ya Republika y'a Rwanda				
Saint Helena	The Saint Helena Government Gazette				
Saint Lucia	Saint Lucia Government Gazette				
Saint Vincent and the Grenadines	Saint Vincent and the Grenadines Government Gazette				
San Marino	Bollettino Ufficiale	Official Bulletin			
Sao Tome and Principe	Diário da República (São Tomé e Príncipe)	Official Gazette			
Saudi Arabia	Um Al-Qura (أُم القُرى)	Mother of the Villages			
Senegal	Journal officiel de la République du Sénégal	Official Gazette of the Republic of Senegal			
Serbia	Službeni glasnik Republike Srbije (Службени гласник Републике Србије)	Official Messenger			
Seychelles	Official Gazette Republic of Seychelles				
Sierra Leone	The Sierra Leone Gazette				
Singapore	Republic of Singapore Government Gazette				
Slovenia	Uradni list Republike Slovenije	Official Gazette of the Republic of Slovenia			
Solomon Islands	Solomon Islands Gazette				
Somaliland	Faafinta Rasmiga Ah	Somaliland Government Gazette			
South Africa	Government Gazette of South Africa	Staatskoerant			
South Korea	Daehanmingug Gwanbo (대한민국 관보)	Republic of Korea Official Gazette			
Spain	Boletín Oficial del Estado	Official Bulletin of the State	1661	Electronic publication	
Sri Lanka	Shrī Laṁkā Prajātāntrika Samājavādī Janarajayē Gæsaṭ Patraya (ශ්‍රී ලංකා ප්‍රජාතාන්ත්‍රික සමාජවාදී ජනරජයේ ගැසට් පත්‍රය) / Ilaṅkai Jaṉanāyaka Cōcalica Kuṭiyaraciṉ Varttamāṉi (இலங்கை ஜனநாயக சோசலிச குடியரசின் வர்த்தமானி)	The Gazette of the Democratic Socialist Republic of Sri Lanka			
Sudan	The Democratic Republic of The Sudan Gazette				
Sweden	Post- och Inrikes Tidningar	Post and Domestic Times			
Switzerland	Bundesblatt / Feuille fédérale / Foglio federale	Federal Gazette			
Taiwan	Xíngzhèngyuàn gōngbào (行政院公報)	Executive Yuan Gazette			
Taiwan	Lìfǎyuàn gōngbào (立法院公報)	Legislative Yuan Gazette			
Tanzania	Gazeti la Jamhuri ya Muungano wa Tanzania	Gazette of the United Republic of Tanzania			
Thailand	Ratchakitchanubeksa (ราชกิจจานุเบกษา)	Royal Gazette			
Timor-Leste	Jornal da República	Journal of the Republic			
Tonga	Tonga Government Gazette				
Togo	Journal officiel de la République Togolaise	Official Journal of the Togolese Republic			
Trinidad and Tobago	Trinidad and Tobago Gazette				
Tunisia	al-Rāʼid al-rasmī lil-Jumhūrīyah al-Tūnisīyah (الرائد الرسمي للجمهورية التونسية)	Official Gazette of the Republic of Tunisia			
Turkey	T.C. Resmî Gazete	Official Gazette of the Republic of Turkey			
Uganda	The Uganda Gazette				
Ukraine	Uryadovy Kuryer (Урядовий кур'єр)	Governmental Courier		Executive	
Ukraine	Holos Ukrayiny (Голос України)	Voice of Ukraine		Legislative	
United Kingdom	The Belfast Gazette				
United Kingdom	The Edinburgh Gazette				
United Kingdom	The London Gazette				
United States	Federal Register				
Uruguay	Diario Oficial	Official Journal			
Vanuatu	Journal Officiel / Official Gazette				
Venezuela	Gaceta Oficial de la República Bolivariana de Venezuela	Official Gazette of the Bolivarian Republic of Venezuela			
Vietnam	Công báo nước Cộng hòa xã hội chủ nghĩa Việt Nam	Official Gazette			
Zambia	Republic of Zambia Government Gazette				
Zimbabwe	Zimbabwean Government Gazette				

== Active publications for subdivisions ==
Country	Province, territory, state, or other subdivision	Name (native)	Name (translation)	Publication Began	Contents	Link
Australia		ACT Government Gazette				
Australia		Government Gazette of the State of New South Wales				
Australia		Northern Territory of Australia Government Gazette				
Australia		Queensland Government Gazette				
Australia		South Australian Government Gazette				
Australia		Tasmanian Government Gazette				
Australia		Victoria Government Gazette				
Australia		Western Australian Government Gazette				
China	Hong Kong	香港特別行政區政府憲報 / Government of the Hong Kong Special Administrative Region Gazette				
China	Macau	澳門特別行政區公報 / Boletim Oficial da Região Administrativa Especial de Macau	Official Gazette of the Macao Special Administrative Region		Bilingual Chinese–Portuguese side-by-side format; Electronic publication only since 2022; 2 series	
Malaysia	Sabah	Warta Kerajaan Sabah	Sabah State Government Gazette			
Mexico		Periódico Oficial del Estado de Durango	Official Newspaper of the State of Durango			
Mexico		Periódico Oficial del Estado de Guanajuato	Official Newspaper of the State of Guanajuato			
Mexico		Periódico Oficial del Estado de Guerrero	Official Newspaper of the State of Guerrero			
Mexico		Periódico Oficial del Estado de Hidalgo	Official Newspaper of the State of Hidalgo			
Mexico		Periódico Oficial del Estado de Jalisco	Official Newspaper of the State of Jalisco			
Mexico		Periódico Oficial "Gaceta del Gobierno" del Estado de México	Official Newspaper "Government Gazette" of the State of Mexico			
Mexico		Periódico Oficial del Estado de Michoacán de Ocampo	Official Newspaper of the State of Michoacán de Ocampo			
Mexico		Periódico Oficial "Tierra y Libertad" del Estado de Morelos	Official Newspaper "Tierra y Libertad" of the State of Morelos			
Mexico		Periódico Oficial del Estado de Nayarit	Official Newspaper of the State of Nayarit			
Mexico		Periódico Oficial del Estado de Nuevo León	Official Newspaper of the State of Nuevo León			
Mexico		Periódico Oficial del Estado de Oaxaca	Official Newspaper of the State of Oaxaca			
Mexico		Periódico Oficial del Estado de Puebla	Official Newspaper of the State of Puebla			
Mexico		"La Sombra de Arteaga" Periódico Oficial del Estado de Querétaro	"La Sombra de Arteaga" Official Newspaper of the State of Querétaro			
Mexico		Periódico Oficial del Estado de Quintana Roo	Official Newspaper of the State of Quintana Roo			
Mexico		Periódico Oficial del Estado de San Luis Potosí	Official Newspaper of the State of San Luis Potosí			
Mexico		"El Estado de Sinaloa" Órgano Oficial del Gobierno del Estado	"El Estado de Sinaloa" Official Organ of the State Government			
Mexico		Boletín Oficial del Estado de Sonora	Official Bulletin of the State of Sonora			
Mexico		Periódico Oficial del Estado de Tabasco	Official Newspaper of the State of Tabasco			
Mexico		Periódico Oficial del Estado de Tamaulipas	Official Newspaper of the State of Tamaulipas			
Mexico		Periódico Oficial del Estado de Tlaxcala	Official Newspaper of the State of Tlaxcala			
Mexico		Gaceta Oficial del Estado de Veracruz	Official Newspaper of the State of Veracruz			
Mexico		Diario Oficial del Estado de Yucatán	Official Journal of the State of Yucatán			
Mexico		Periódico Oficial del Estado de Zacatecas	Official Newspaper of the State of Zacatecas			
Portugal		Jornal Oficial da Região Autónoma da Madeira	Official Journal of the Autonomous Region of Madeira			
Portugal		Jornal Oficial da Região Autónoma dos Açores	Official Journal of the Autonomous Region of Azores			
Serbia		Službeni list Autonomne Pokrajine Vojvodine (Службени лист Аутономне Покрајине Војводине)	Official Gazette Autonomous Province of Vojvodina			
Spain		Boletín Oficial de la Junta de Andalucía	Official Bulletin of the Government of Andalusia			
Spain		Boletín Oficial de Aragón	Official Bulletin of Aragon			
Spain		Boletín Oficial del Principado de Asturias	Official Bulletin of the Principality of Asturias			
Spain		Butlletí Oficial de les Illes Balears	Official Bulletin of the Balearic Islands			
Spain		Euskal Herriko Agintaritzaren Aldizkaria	Official Bulletin of the Basque Country			
Spain		Boletín Oficial de Canarias	Official Bulletin of the Canary Islands			
Spain		Boletín Oficial de Cantabria	Official Bulletin of Cantabria			
Spain		Diario Oficial de Castilla–La Mancha	Official Journal of Castilla–La Mancha			
Spain		Boletín Oficial de Castilla y León	Official Bulletin of Castile and León			
Spain		Diari Oficial de la Generalitat de Catalunya	Official Journal of the Government of Catalonia			
Spain		Diario Oficial de Extremadura	Official Journal of Extremadura			
Spain		Diario Oficial de Galicia	Official Journal of Galicia			
Spain		Boletín Oficial de la Rioja	Official Bulletin of La Rioja			
Spain		Boletín Oficial de la Comunidad de Madrid	Official Bulletin of the Community of Madrid			
Spain		Boletín Oficial de la Región de Murcia	Official Bulletin of the Region of Murcia			
Spain		Nafarroako Aldizkari Ofiziala	Official Bulletin of Navarre			
Spain		Diari Oficial de la Comunitat Valenciana	Official Journal of the Valencian Community			
Spain		Boletín Oficial de la Ciudad Autónoma de Ceuta	Official Bulletin of the Autonomous City of Ceuta			
Spain		Boletín Oficial de la Ciudad Autónoma de Melilla	Official Bulletin of the Autonomous City of Melilla			
United Arab Emirates	Abu Dhabi	Al-Ǧarīdaẗ al-rasmiyyaẗ (الجريدة الرسمية) / Official Gazette			Abu Dhabi official gazette	
United Arab Emirates	Dubai	Al-Ǧarīdaẗ al-rasmiyyaẗ (الجريدة الرسمية)	Official Gazette		Dubai Official Gazette	
United States	Arizona	Arizona Administrative Register				
United States	California	California Regulatory Notice Register				
United States	Florida	Florida Administrative Register				
United States	Illinois	Illinois Register				
United States	Michigan	Michigan Register				
United States	Louisiana	Louisiana Register				
United States	Minnesota	Minnesota State Register				
United States	New Jersey	New Jersey Register				
United States	New Mexico	New Mexico Register				
United States	New York State	New York State Register				
United States	New York City	The City Record				
United States	Pennsylvania	Pennsylvania Bulletin				
United States	Washington	Washington State Register				
United States	West Virginia	West Virginia State Register				

== Active publications for international organizations ==
Organization	Name (native)	Name (translation)	Publication Began	Contents	Link
European Union	Official Journal of the European Union				
European Union	Official Journal of the European Patent Office				
ICAO	ICAO Journal				
United Nations	Journal of the United Nations				

== See also ==
- List of British colonial gazettes
