= Official Gazette =

An official gazette is a public journal.

Official Gazette may also refer to:

- Official Gazette (Barbados)
- Official Gazette (Oman)
- Official Gazette (Philippines)
- Official Gazette (South Yemen)
- Official Gazette of Bosnia and Herzegovina
- Official Gazette of Iraq
- Official Gazette of the Federation (Mexico)
- Official Gazette of the Republic of Tunisia
- Official Gazette of the Republic of Turkey
- Official Gazette The Bahamas
- The Official Gazette of Guyana
- Trademark Official Gazette, of the United States Patent and Trademark Office

== See also ==
- Gazzetta Ufficiale, Italy
- List of government gazettes
