= The Nigeria Gazette =

Government gazette of the Colony and Protectorate of Nigeria (1914–1954)

Flag of the Colony and Protectorate of Nigeria

The Nigeria Gazette was the government gazette for the Colony and Protectorate of Nigeria. It was published at Lagos between 1914 and 1954.

It replaced the Northern Nigeria Gazette and the Southern Nigeria Government Gazette and was continued by the Federation of Nigeria Official Gazette.

== See also ==
- List of British colonial gazettes
