= British Bechuanaland Government Gazette =

Government gazette of British Bechuanaland

The British Bechuanaland Government Gazette was the government gazette of British Bechuanaland. It was published between 1887 and 1895, after which British Bechuanaland became part of Cape Colony. It was replaced by the Cape of Good Hope Government Gazette.

== See also ==
- List of British colonial gazettes
