= Northern Nigeria Gazette =

Government gazette of the Northern Nigeria Protectorate (1900–1913)

Flag of the Northern Nigeria Protectorate

The Northern Nigeria Gazette was the government gazette for the British colony of the Northern Nigeria Protectorate. It was published between 1900 and 1913.

It was continued by The Nigeria Gazette.

== See also ==
- List of British colonial gazettes
