= List of British colonial gazettes =

This is a list of official government gazettes for current and former British colonies or protectorates. Some are available to consult at the British National Archives or the British Library.

- Aden: Aden Colony Gazette
- Bahamas: Official Gazette The Bahamas
- Barbados: Official Gazette
- British Bechuanaland: British Bechuanaland Government Gazette
- British Central Africa: British Central Africa Gazette
- British Guiana: The Official Gazette of Guyana
- British Honduras: Honduras Gazette
- British Kaffraria: British Kaffrarian Government Gazette
- British Virgin Islands: The Virgin Islands Official Gazette
- Canada: Canada Gazette
- Cape Colony: Cape of Good Hope Government Gazette
- Cape of Good Hope: Province of Cape of Good Hope Official Gazette
- Cayman Islands: Cayman Islands Gazette
- Ceylon: The Sri Lanka Gazette
- Cyprus: Cyprus Government Gazette
- Falkland Islands: Falkland Islands Gazette
- Federated Malay States: Federated Malay States Government Gazette
- Hong Kong: Hong Kong Government Gazette
- India: The Gazette of India
- Ireland: The Dublin Gazette
- Lagos: Government Gazette
- Leeward Islands: The Leeward Islands Gazette
- Malta: Malta Government Gazette
- Malacca: Malacca Gazette
- Newfoundland: Newfoundland Gazette
- Negri Sembilan: Negri Sembilan Government Gazette
- New South Wales: Government Gazette of the State of New South Wales
- New Zealand: The New Zealand Gazette
- North-Eastern Rhodesia: North-Eastern Rhodesia Gazette
- Northern Rhodesia: Northern Rhodesia Government Gazette
- Northern Territory of Australia: Northern Territory of Australia Government Gazette
- Nova Scotia: Halifax Gazette
- Nyasaland: Nyasaland Government Gazette
- Ontario: Ontario Gazette
- Pakistan: The Gazette of Pakistan
- Penang: Pinang Gazette
- Québec: Gazette officielle du Québec
- Queensland: Queensland Government Gazette
- Sarawak: Sarawak Gazette
- Selangor: Selangor Gazette
- South Africa: Government Gazette of South Africa
- British South Africa Company: British South Africa Company Government Gazette
- South Australia: South Australian Government Gazette
- South Georgia and South Sandwich Islands: South Georgia and South Sandwich Islands Gazette
- South West Africa: Official Gazette of South West Africa
- Southern Nigeria Protectorate: Government Gazette of the Protectorate of Southern Nigeria (1900-1906), Southern Nigeria Government Gazette (1907-1913)
- Southern Rhodesia: Southern Rhodesia Government Gazette
- Sydney: The Sydney Gazette
- Tasmania: Tasmanian Government Gazette
- Transvaal: Province of the Transvaal Official Gazette, The Transvaal Government Gazette
- Victoria: Victoria Government Gazette
- Western Australia: Western Australian Government Gazette

== See also ==
- List of government gazettes
