= Federation of Nigeria Official Gazette =

Government gazette of Nigeria (1954–1963)

Federation of Nigeria Official Gazette was the government gazette for the Colony and Protectorate of Nigeria (1954 to 1960) and of the Federation of Nigeria after three years of its independence (1960–63). It was published at Lagos.

It replaced The Nigeria Gazette and was continued by the Federal Republic of Nigeria Official Gazette.

== See also ==
- List of British colonial gazettes
