= Aden Colony Gazette =

Government gazette of the Colony of Aden

The Aden Colony Gazette was the government gazette for the Colony of Aden (1930s to 1963), and of the State of Aden within the Federation of South Arabia (1963-67). It was published at Aden.

It was continued by the Official Gazette of the People's Democratic Republic of Yemen.

== See also ==
- List of British colonial gazettes
