= British Central Africa Gazette =

Government gazette of the British Central Africa Protectorate

The British Central Africa Gazette was the government gazette of the British Central Africa Protectorate.

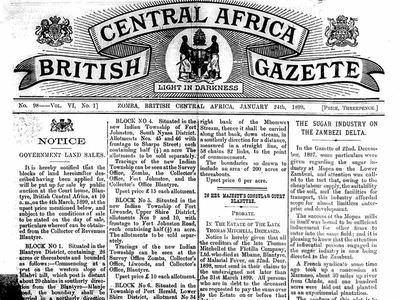
British Central Africa Gazette guess 1910

The Gazette was published monthly at Milia between 1894 and September 1907 in English. Copies may be found in the collections of the British Library and the Library of Congress. It was replaced by the Nyasaland government gazette in October 1907.

== See also ==
- List of British colonial gazettes
