= Official Gazette of Vietnam =

National gazette of Vietnam

Công báo nước Cộng hòa xã hội chủ nghĩa Việt Nam

- Cover of the Công báo from 25 April 2025, carrying the plan for the 2025 reorganisation of administrative units
- Type: Government gazette
- Format: A4
- Founder: Provisional Government of the Democratic Republic of Vietnam
- Publisher: Government Office
- Founded: 29 September 1945; 81 years ago
- Language: Vietnamese
- Headquarters: 1 Hoàng Hoa Thám Street, Ba Đình Ward, Hanoi 10040, Vietnam
- Website: congbao.chinhphu.vn

The Official Gazette of Vietnam (Vietnamese: Công báo) (Note: Công báo nước Cộng hòa xã hội chủ nghĩa Việt Nam (lit. 'Official Gazette of the Socialist Republic of Vietnam')) is the national gazette of Vietnam. The gazette comprises legal normative documents issued by central state agencies as well as treaties. It is published by the Government Office, whereas Công báo cấp tỉnh (lit. 'Official Provincial Gazette') is published by provincial-level People's Committee offices.

Under Vietnamese law, legal normative documents issued by central state agencies are to be published in the gazette, with the exception of state secrets. However, publication is not a requirement for them to take effect. Legal normative documents published in the Công báo are not protected by copyright.

The Công báo had its first issue on 29 September 1945 as the Việt Nam dân quốc Công báo (lit. 'Official Gazette of the National Republic of Vietnam'). Following the outbreak of fighting in the Battle of Hanoi in 1946, the publication was relocated to Việt Bắc with the government. It was renamed Công báo nước Việt Nam Dân chủ Cộng hòa (lit. 'Official Gazette of the Democratic Republic of Vietnam') and placed under the Prime Minister in 1950. After the reunification of Vietnam, it adopted Công báo nước Cộng hòa xã hội chủ nghĩa Việt Nam (lit. 'Official Gazette of the Socialist Republic of Vietnam') in 1976. In 2004, a government decree officially recognised the electronic version of the gazette. The Công báo is published online as of 2025.

== History ==
Cover of the Việt Nam dân quốc Công báo, carrying Bảo Đại's abdication declaration

=== 1945–1946 ===
On 31 August 1945, a decree signed on behalf of Interior Minister Võ Nguyên Giáp by the Interior Ministry chief of staff, Hoàng Minh Giám, abolished the Journal officiel de l'Indochine (lit. 'Official Journal of Indochina') from 1 September. The decree replaced it with the Việt Nam dân quốc Công báo (lit. 'Official Gazette of the National Republic of Vietnam'). The gazette was to be published in Hanoi, with the ministry overseeing its printing and distribution to government offices throughout Vietnam.

The Công báo published its first issue on 29 September 1945 with a print run of 920 copies. The issue carried Bảo Đại's abdication declaration and the 28 August declaration establishing the Provisional Government of the Democratic Republic of Vietnam. A price and sales-point box appeared in the gazette's 26 January 1946 issue, listing 1$80 per issue, six-month and one-year subscriptions at 50 and 90; (Note: Amounts are given as printed.) subscriptions had to be paid in advance. Copies of this issue were sold at Viễn Đông Ấn Quán (lit. 'Far East Printing House') at 28 Tràng Tiền Street, Hanoi.

=== 1947–1975 ===
After fighting broke out in Hanoi in December 1946, the Công báo was moved with the government to Việt Bắc in 1947. It operated on a reduced schedule, moving from publishing weekly to monthly. Issues in December 1948 and in April 1950 noted that the gazette was published by the Chủ tịch phủ Chính phủ (lit. 'Presidential Palace of the Government') and printed by the Độc Lập (lit. 'Independence') and Tiến Bộ (lit. 'Progress') printing houses respectively.

On 10 July 1950, Deputy Prime Minister Phạm Văn Đồng signed a decree renaming the publication Công báo nước Việt Nam Dân chủ Cộng hòa (lit. 'Official Gazette of the Democratic Republic of Vietnam') and placing it under the jurisdiction of the Prime Minister. During the First Indochina War, many documents were lost due to government relocations. The Công báo preserved some legal and administrative documents whose originals were no longer available.

The Legal Affairs Department (Vietnamese: Vụ Pháp chế) was created within the Prime Minister's office in 1957. A circular in 1959 defined detailed regulations on using the Công báo for the first time, requiring ministries to submit their legal and administrative documents and selected case-specific decisions to be published in the Công báo, with the exception of state secrets. Ministries were to send their documents to the Legal Affairs Department, which agreed with each ministry on whether to publish them, and proofread the gazette before publication. During the Vietnam War, the Phụ lục Công báo (lit. 'Official Gazette Appendix') was published separately to distribute restricted documents within state agencies in 1965; it was discontinued in 1989.

=== 1976–2001 ===
On 1 July 1976, the Office of the Prime Minister's Palace (Vietnamese: Văn phòng Phủ Thủ tướng) released a notice of Công báo nước Việt Nam Dân chủ Cộng hòa's discontinuation and its replacement, Công báo nước Cộng hòa xã hội chủ nghĩa Việt Nam (lit. 'Official Gazette of the Socialist Republic of Vietnam'). In March 1977, a Government Council resolution provided for the publication in the gazette of a list of legal documents of the Democratic Republic of Vietnam and the Provisional Revolutionary Government of the Republic of South Vietnam that would be enforced nationwide. Between 1976 and 1985, 1,259 of the 7,488 legal normative documents issued by the prime minister and the government were published in the Công báo (16.8%).

A circular issued by the Government Office in 1992 stated that the gazette was to be published twice a month with an annual index and placed distribution of it under the General Department of Posts and Telecommunications. From 1994, the Vietnam News Agency, in cooperation with the Government Office, introduced an English edition of the gazette. In 1996, the National Assembly passed a law requiring central state agencies' legal normative documents to be published in the gazette within 15 days of being promulgated or signed. On 10 December 2001, the US–Vietnam Bilateral Trade Agreement entered into force, stating "Only laws, regulations and administrative procedures of general application that are published and readily available to other governments and persons engaged in commercial activity will be enforced and enforceable."

=== 2002–present ===
The 2002 amendment to the Law on Promulgation of Legal Normative Documents stated that most legal normative documents could only take legal effect 15 days after publication in the gazette. The United States Department of State considered the amendment to the law met some of Vietnam's commitments under the Bilateral Trade Agreement, but that Vietnam was not yet fully compliant. In 2004, a government decree included the electronic edition in the definition of the Công báo, noting that the prime minister was to decide the activities of the electronic edition. The 2015 Law on Promulgation of Legal Normative Documents dropped the rule that documents not published in the gazette had no effect. In 2025, the Gazette, Data and Technology Division (Vietnamese: Ban Công báo, Dữ liệu và Công nghệ) was created to operate the Công báo.

== Organisation ==
The Công báo is published by the Government Office and operated by the Department of Government Information and Communications (Vietnamese: Cục Thông tin và Truyền thông Chính phủ) through the Gazette, Data and Technology Division. The department is responsible for managing, publishing and distributing the electronic gazette as well as monitoring the implementation of law on it. In addition, the department is to provide guidance to, and inspect, the provincial electronic gazettes, run by offices of provincial People's Committees. As of 2026, the department is headed by Department Chief Nguyễn Hồng Sâm.

== Contents ==
In accordance with statutory law, the Công báo acts as a mandatory publication platform for central state bodies' legal normative documents and for treaties, with the exception of state secrets. Legal normative documents posted on the gazette have the same value as original documents. Translations of them only have reference value. Legal normative documents and official translations of them are not protected by copyright.

The gazette publishes the following, divided into six categories:

- Legal normative documents of central state bodies.
- Documents repealing or suspending unlawful legal normative documents.
- Notices that documents remain in force, and lists of expired documents.
- Treaties in force for Vietnam.
- Corrections to legal normative documents.
- Other documents of central state bodies, at their discretion.

== Publication ==
Under Vietnamese law, a legal normative document issued by a central state body comes into force on a date specified within it, but not earlier than 45 days after adoption or signing; however, documents issued under a shortened procedure or in special cases may come into force on adoption or signing. Legal normative documents of all central state bodies are required to be submitted to the gazette for publication within 3 days of their promulgation or signing. If the Government Office detects an error within the submitted document, an official copy must be submitted to the office within 1 day of being notified. The Government Office must publish submitted documents in the Công báo within 15 days of receiving them in order of their receipt and urgency. Documents under the shortened procedure must be submitted to the office on the same day they were signed or promulgated and posted immediately upon receipt.

== Sources ==
=== Primary sources ===
- Law on Promulgation of Legal Normative Documents (Law No. 64/2025/QH15). National Assembly. 19 February 2025. Archived from the original on 22 November 2026 – via LuatVietnam.
- Quyết định quy định chức năng, nhiệm vụ, quyền hạn và cơ cấu tổ chức của Cục Thông tin và Truyền thông Chính phủ [Decision on the Functions, Tasks, Powers and Organisation of the Department of Government Information and Communications] (Decision No. 356/QĐ-VPCP) (in Vietnamese). Government Office. 1 July 2026.
- Thông tư về việc đăng Công báo và sử dụng Công báo [Circular on Publication in and Use of the Official Gazette] (Circular No. 1771-PC) (in Vietnamese). Prime Minister's Office. 24 April 1959.
- Thông tư hướng dẫn thi hành Quyết định số 200-TTg ngày 28-12-1992 của Thủ tướng Chính phủ về việc xuất bản và phát hành tờ Công báo nước Cộng hoà xã hội chủ nghĩa Việt Nam [Circular Guiding the Implementation of the Prime Minister's Decision No. 200-TTg of 28 December 1992 on the Publication and Distribution of the Official Gazette of the Socialist Republic of Vietnam] (Circular No. 145-BT) (in Vietnamese). Government Office. 28 December 1992.
- Quyết định quy định chức năng, nhiệm vụ, quyền hạn và cơ cấu tổ chức của Cổng Thông tin điện tử Chính phủ [Decision on the Functions, Tasks, Powers and Organisation of the Government Information Portal] (Decision No. 319/QĐ-VPCP) (in Vietnamese). Government Office. 22 May 2025.
- Nghị định thành lập Vụ Pháp chế trực thuộc Thủ tướng phủ [Decree Establishing the Legal Affairs Department Under the Prime Minister's Office] (Decree No. 504-TTg) (in Vietnamese). Prime Minister. 26 October 1957.
- Nghị định về Công báo nước Cộng hoà xã hội chủ nghĩa Việt Nam [Decree on the Official Gazette of the Socialist Republic of Vietnam] (Decree No. 104/2004/NĐ-CP) (in Vietnamese). Government. 23 March 2004.
- Nghị định quy định chi tiết một số điều và biện pháp để tổ chức, hướng dẫn thi hành Luật Ban hành văn bản quy phạm pháp luật [Decree Detailing a Number of Articles of, and Measures to Organise and Guide the Implementation of, the Law on Promulgation of Legal Normative Documents] (Decree No. 78/2025/NĐ-CP) (in Vietnamese). Government. 1 April 2025.
- Nghị định sửa đổi, bổ sung một số điều của Nghị định số 78/2025/NĐ-CP ngày 01 tháng 4 năm 2025 của Chính phủ quy định chi tiết một số điều và biện pháp để tổ chức, hướng dẫn thi hành Luật Ban hành văn bản quy phạm pháp luật và Nghị định số 79/2025/NĐ-CP ngày 01 tháng 4 năm 2025 của Chính phủ về kiểm tra, rà soát, hệ thống hóa và xử lý văn bản quy phạm pháp luật [Decree Amending and Supplementing a Number of Articles of Decree No. 78/2025/NĐ-CP and Decree No. 79/2025/NĐ-CP] (Decree No. 187/2025/NĐ-CP) (in Vietnamese). Government. 1 July 2025.
- Luật sửa đổi, bổ sung một số điều của Luật Ban hành văn bản quy phạm pháp luật [Law Amending and Supplementing a Number of Articles of the Law on Promulgation of Legal Normative Documents] (Law No. 02/2002/QH11) (in Vietnamese). National Assembly. 16 December 2002.
- Luật Sở hữu trí tuệ [Law on Intellectual Property] (Law No. 50/2005/QH11) (in Vietnamese). National Assembly. 29 November 2005.
- Luật Ban hành văn bản quy phạm pháp luật [Law on Promulgation of Legal Normative Documents] (Law No. 64/2025/QH15) (in Vietnamese). National Assembly. 19 February 2025.
- Nghị quyết về việc hướng dẫn thi hành và xây dựng pháp luật thống nhất cho cả nước [Resolution on Guiding the Implementation and Development of Unified Law for the Country] (Resolution No. 76-CP) (in Vietnamese). Government Council. 25 March 1977.
- Quyết định ban hành Mã bưu chính quốc gia [Decision Issuing the National Postal Code] (Decision No. 2475/QĐ-BTTTT) (in Vietnamese). Ministry of Information and Communications. 29 December 2017.
- Agreement Between the United States of America and the Socialist Republic of Vietnam on Trade Relations. United States and Vietnam. 13 July 2000.
- "Việt Nam Dân Quốc Công Báo" [Official Gazette of the National Republic of Vietnam]. Newspaper Library (in Vietnamese). National Library. Archived from the original on 15 October 2025.
- "Lịch sử hình thành và phát triển Công báo nước Cộng hòa xã hội chủ nghĩa Việt Nam" [History of the Formation and Development of the Official Gazette of the Socialist Republic of Vietnam]. Official Gazette of Đồng Nai (in Vietnamese). Đồng Nai Provincial People's Committee Office. Archived from the original on 2 November 2026.
- "Trang chủ Công báo điện tử nước Cộng hoà xã hội chủ nghĩa Việt Nam" [Home Page of the Electronic Official Gazette of the Socialist Republic of Vietnam] (in Vietnamese). Government Office. Archived from the original on 2 November 2026.
- "Official Gazette = Công báo / Socialist Republic of Vietnam". UC Berkeley Law Library Catalog. UC Berkeley School of Law. Archived from the original on 2 November 2026.
- "About Us". Vietnam Law & Legal Forum. Vietnam News Agency. Archived from the original on 22 November 2026.

=== Secondary sources ===
- Nguyễn, Trung Thành (25 December 2015). "Quyền tiếp cận thông tin: từ lý luận đến thực tiễn tại Việt Nam" [Right to Access Information: From Theory to Reality in Vietnam]. Vietnam Journal of Science and Technology – MOST (in Vietnamese). 57 (12). Ministry of Science and Technology: 49–56. eISSN 2615-9929. ISSN 1859-4794. Archived from the original on 22 November 2026.
- Nguyễn, Văn Thọ (14 March 2024b). "Quy trình ban hành văn bản sửa đổi, bổ sung văn bản quy phạm pháp luật" [Process for Issuing Documents That Amend and Supplement Legal Normative Documents]. Journal of State Management (in Vietnamese) (338). National Academy of Public Administration: 121–126. doi:10.59394/qlnn.338.2024.812. ISSN 2815-5831. Archived from the original on 22 November 2026.
- Trần, Hoài Nam; Vũ, Văn Huân (24 August 2026). "Về ngôn ngữ, thể thức, kỹ thuật trình bày và dịch văn bản quy phạm pháp luật ra tiếng dân tộc thiểu số, tiếng nước ngoài theo Luật Ban hành văn bản quy phạm pháp luật năm 2025" [On Language, Form, Drafting Techniques, and Translation of Legal Normative Documents into Minority Languages and Foreign Languages Under the 2025 Law on Promulgation of Legal Normative Documents]. Legislative Studies Journal (in Vietnamese) (16). National Assembly Office: 45–55. ISSN 1859-2953. Archived from the original on 22 November 2026.
- Parker, Steve; Phan, Vinh Quang; Nguyen, Ngoc Anh (September 2005). "Has the U.S.-Vietnam Bilateral Trade Agreement Led to Higher FDI into Vietnam?". International Journal of Applied Economics. 2 (2). Institute of International Economic Studies: 199–223. Archived from the original on 22 November 2026.
- Trương, Thị Bích Hạnh; Nguyễn, Ánh Sao Băng (December 2025). "Cuộc đấu tranh xây dựng và bảo vệ chính quyền sau Cách mạng tháng Tám ở Việt Nam qua phản ánh của báo chí" [The struggle to Build and Defend the Government After the August Revolution in Vietnam as Reflected in the Press] (PDF). Museum Bulletin (in Vietnamese). Vietnam National Museum of History: 118–125. Archived (PDF) from the original on 22 November 2026.
- Fforde, Adam (October 2010). "Vietnam: Water Policy Dynamics Under a Post-Cold War Communism". Water Alternatives. 3 (3). Water Alternatives Association: 552–574. ISSN 1965-0175. Archived from the original on 24 March 2025.
- Nicholson, Pip (August 2005). "Vietnamese Jurisprudence: Informing Court Reform". In Gillespie, John; Nicholson, Pip (eds.). Asian Socialism and Legal Change: The Dynamics of Vietnamese and Chinese Reform. ANU E Press and Asia Pacific Press. pp. 159–190. doi:10.22459/ASLC.08.2005.08. ISBN 978-1-920942-27-4.
- Dang, Trung Ha (2018). Adopting Freedom of Information Law and the Quest for the Right of Access to Information in Vietnam (PhD thesis). Griffith University. doi:10.25904/1912/2890.
- Nguyen, Phan Khoi (2022). Copyright Law in Vietnam: Substantive and Private International Law Aspects (PhD thesis). University of Groningen. doi:10.33612/diss.210757328.
- Nguyễn Quý (9 April 2025). "Văn bản quy phạm pháp luật phải được đăng tải toàn văn, đầy đủ trên công báo điện tử" [Legal Normative Documents Must Be Posted in Full on the Electronic Official Gazette]. Vietnam Lawyer Journal (in Vietnamese). Vietnam Bar Federation. Archived from the original on 22 November 2026.
- Trần Minh (26 May 2025). "Cơ cấu tổ chức của Cổng Thông tin điện tử Chính phủ từ 15/6/2025" [Organisation of the Government Electronic Information Portal from 15 June 2025]. Vietnam Lawyer Journal (in Vietnamese). Vietnam Bar Federation. Archived from the original on 22 November 2026.
- Phương Thảo (23 September 2025). "Hướng dẫn mới về Công báo điện tử" [New Guidance on the Electronic Official Gazette]. Vietnam Lawyer Journal (in Vietnamese). Vietnam Bar Federation. Archived from the original on 22 November 2026.
- Đỗ, Thị Thu Huyền (9 July 2025). "Về thẩm quyền ban hành và hiệu lực của văn bản quy phạm pháp luật theo Luật Ban hành văn bản quy phạm pháp luật năm 2025" [On the Competence to Issue, and the Effect of, Legal Normative Documents Under the 2025 Law on Promulgation of Legal Normative Documents]. Journal of State Management (in Vietnamese). Academy of Public Administration and Governance. Archived from the original on 22 November 2026.
- Nguyễn, Nhật Vy (9 September 2024a). "Công báo là gì? Những văn bản nào được đăng trên Công báo nước Cộng hòa xã hội chủ nghĩa Việt Nam?" [What Is the Official Gazette? Which Documents Are Posted in the Official Gazette of the Socialist Republic of Vietnam?]. Thư viện Pháp luật (in Vietnamese). Archived from the original on 2 November 2026.
- Le, Thi Hanh (March–April 2022). "Vietnam Legal Research". GlobaLex. Hauser Global Law School Program, New York University School of Law. Archived from the original on 22 November 2026.
- Bùi, Thị Huế (20 January 2016). "Một số điểm mới của Luật Ban hành văn bản quy phạm pháp luật năm 2015". sotuphap.ninhbinh.gov.vn (in Vietnamese). Archived from the original on 22 November 2026.
- "2007 Investment Climate Statement – Vietnam". 2001–2009 Archive for the U.S. Department of State. 20 February 2007. Archived from the original on 22 November 2026.
