= Government Gazette (Lagos) =

Government gazette of Lagos (1887–1906)

The flag of Lagos Colony

The Government Gazette was the government gazette for the British colony of Lagos. It was published between 1887 and April 1906.

It was continued by the Government Gazette of the Protectorate of Southern Nigeria after Lagos was incorporated into the already existing Southern Nigeria Protectorate in February 1906.

== See also ==
- List of British colonial gazettes
