= Government Gazette (Zambia) =

Republic of Zambia Government Gazette is the official publication of the Government of Zambia and publishes laws, ordinances and other regulations.

== History ==
Before Zambia gained independence the Northern Rhodesia Government Gazette was the government gazette of Northern Rhodesia. The Gazette was published by the British South Africa Company from 1911 until it was taken over by the Colonial Office in 1924 when they assumed responsibility for Northern Rhodesia. It continued until independence in 1964 when it was replaced by the Zambian government gazette.

== See also ==
- List of government gazettes
