= Government Gazette (Botswana) =

Official publication of the Government of Botswana

- Type: Weekly
- Format: Print
- Owner: Government of Botswana
- Country: Botswana

Botswana Government Gazette is the official publication of the Government of Botswana and publishes laws, ordinances and other regulations. The government gazette is printed by the Government Printing and Publishing Services.

== See also ==
- List of government gazettes
