= Government Gazette of Sudan =

The Democratic Republic of The Sudan Gazette is the official publication of the Government of Sudan and publishes laws, ordinances and other regulations.

== Published material ==
The Gazette includes proclamations by the President as well as both general and government notices made by its various departments. It publishes regulations and notices in terms of acts, changes of names, company registrations and deregistrations, financial statements, land restitution notices, liquor licence applications and transport permits. Board and legal notices are also published in the Gazette; these cover insolvencies, liquidation and estate notices.

== See also ==
- List of government gazettes
