= British South Africa Company Government Gazette =

Government gazette of the British South Africa Company

The British South Africa Company Government Gazette was the government gazette of the British South Africa Company.

The Gazette was published in Salisbury between 1894 and 1923. Until 30 June 1899, it was issued as a supplement to the Rhodesia Herald.

Publication ceased in 1923 when the British government did not renew the Company's charter, and the territories previously administered became the self-governing colony of Southern Rhodesia and the Protectorate of Northern Rhodesia.

== See also ==
- List of British colonial gazettes
