= British Kaffrarian Government Gazette =

Government gazette of British Kaffraria

The British Kaffrarian Government Gazette was the government gazette of British Kaffraria. It was published in the 1860s during the brief period for which British Kaffraria was a Crown Colony (1860–1866).

== See also ==
- List of British colonial gazettes
