= Province of the Transvaal Official Gazette =

Government gazette of Transvaal

The Province of the Transvaal Official Gazette was the government gazette of Transvaal Province. It was published from 1910.

== See also ==
- List of British colonial gazettes
- The Transvaal Government Gazette (1877–1881)
