= The Leeward Islands Gazette =

Government gazette of the Leeward Islands

The Leeward Islands Gazette was the government gazette of the British Leeward Islands, published in Antigua from 1872 until it was replaced by The Antigua, Montserrat and Virgin Islands Official Gazette.

== See also ==
- List of British colonial gazettes
- List of newspapers in Antigua and Barbuda
