= South Georgia and South Sandwich Islands Gazette =

Government gazette of South Georgia and the South Sandwich Islands

The South Georgia and South Sandwich Islands Gazette is the government gazette of South Georgia and the South Sandwich Islands. It is published in Stanley in the Falkland Islands.

The Gazette is published under provisions contained in The South Georgia and South Sandwich Islands Order 1985 which brought the territory into existence. The area covered by the territory had previously been known as the Falkland Islands Dependencies.

== See also ==
- List of British colonial gazettes
