= Southern Nigeria Government Gazette =

Government gazette of Southern Nigeria (1907–1913)

The flag of the Protectorate of Southern Nigeria

The Southern Nigeria Government Gazette was the government gazette for the Colony and Protectorate of Southern Nigeria. It was published at Lagos between 1907 and 1913.

It replaced the Government Gazette of the Protectorate of Southern Nigeria and was continued by The Nigeria Gazette.

== See also ==
- List of British colonial gazettes
