= Official Gazette of the Republic of Rwanda =

Government gazette of Rwanda

- Type: Government gazette
- Owner: Government of Rwanda
- Publisher: Ministry of Justice (MINIJUST)
- Language: Kinyarwanda, English, French
- Headquarters: Kigali, Rwanda
- OCLC number: 984952914
- Website: www.minijust.gov.rw/official-gazette

The Official Gazette of the Republic of Rwanda (Igazeti ya Leta ya Repubulika y'u Rwanda; Journal Officiel de la République du Rwanda) is the official publication of the government of the Republic of Rwanda. It serves as the primary medium for the publication of legislative acts and other official notices, with all laws and orders published in Kinyarwanda, English, and French.

== Contents ==
The Official Gazette publishes the following legal and administrative documents:

- Legislation (Laws and Organic Laws passed by the Parliament of Rwanda)
- Presidential Orders and Prime Minister's Orders
- Ministerial Orders and other regulatory instruments
- Statutes of commercial companies, non-governmental organisations (NGOs), and cooperatives
- Legal notices, including change of name declarations and land-related announcements

== Publication frequency ==
The Official Gazette is published on a weekly basis, specifically every Monday. In addition to the regular weekly editions, "Special" or extraordinary editions are frequently released in the middle of the week to accommodate urgent legislation or appointments that require immediate legal commencement.

== Archive search ==
The Ministry of Justice maintains a digital archive of the Official Gazette on its official website, providing free public access to editions dating back to 2004. Citizens can also use the Irembo platform to pay for subscriptions, purchase specific physical editions, or apply for the publication of private notices such as company statutes or legal name changes.

== See also ==
- List of government gazettes
