= Province of Cape of Good Hope Official Gazette =

Government gazette of the Province of the Cape of Good Hope

The Province of Cape of Good Hope Official Gazette was the government gazette of the Province of the Cape of Good Hope.

It was published in Cape Town from June 1910 and replaced the Cape of Good Hope Government Gazette (1826-1910) when Cape Colony became a Province.

== See also ==
- List of British colonial gazettes
