= Northern Nigeria Protectorate =

British protectorate from 1900 to 1914

Coordinates: 9.8000°N 6.1500°E

- 1900–1914
- Ensign Badge
- Anthem: "God Save the King"
- Northern Nigeria (red); British possessions in Africa (pink); 1913
- Status: Protectorate of British Empire
- Capital: Zungeru
- Common languages: English (official); Hausa, Arabic, Yoruba, Fula, Kanuri, Nupe, Igala, Jukun widely spoken
- Religion: Islam, Christianity, Yoruba religion, African traditional religion
- Government: Constitutional monarchy
- Monarch
  - 1900–1901: Victoria
  - 1901-1910: Edward VII
  - 1910–1914: George V
- High Commissioner
  - 1900–1906: Sir Frederick Lugard
  - 1907–1909: Sir Percy Girouard
  - 1909–1911: Sir Henry Hesketh Bell
  - 1911-1912: Charles Lindsay Temple acting
  - 1912–1914: Sir Frederick Lugard
- History
  - Established: 1 January 1900
  - Disestablished: 1 January 1914
- Currency: Pound sterling (1900–13); British West African pound (1913–14)
Preceded by
Sokoto Caliphate
Bornu Empire
Wukari Federation
Igala Kingdom
Borgu Emirate
Succeeded by
Nigeria Protectorate

Northern Nigeria (Hausa: Arewacin Najeriya) was a British protectorate which lasted from 1900 until 1914, and covered the northern part of what is now Nigeria.

The protectorate spanned 660,000 square kilometres (255,000 mi^{2}) and included the emirates of the Sokoto Caliphate and parts of the former Bornu Empire, conquered in 1902. The first High Commissioner of the protectorate was Frederick Lugard, who suppressed slavery and tribal raiding and created a system of administration built around native authorities.

The Protectorate was ended on 1 January 1914, when its area was unified with the Southern Nigeria Protectorate and the Lagos Colony, becoming the Northern Province of the Colony and Protectorate of Nigeria.

== Foundation ==
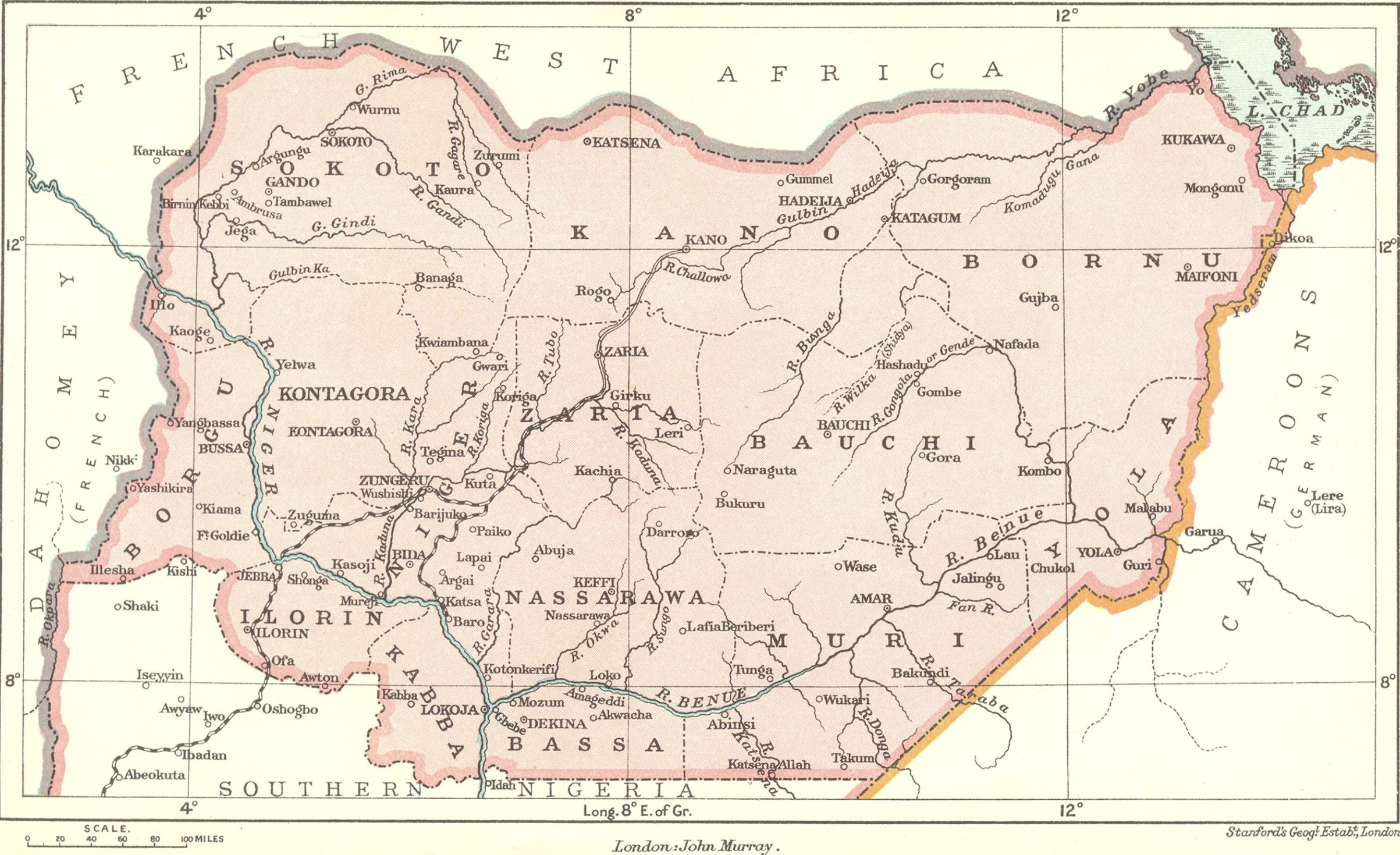
1911 map of the protectorate showing its provinces

The Berlin Conference of 1884 and 1885 provided the area that would become the Northern Nigeria Protectorate to the British. The Royal Niger Company was formed in 1886 with George Taubman Goldie as the vice governor. The Company moved in-land and negotiated trade agreements and political agreements, sometimes coercive, with several local chieftains. In 1897, Frederick Lugard was the appointed head of the West African Frontier Force which was tasked with stopping Fulani resistance and possible French incursions in the northwest area.

On 1 January 1900, the Royal Niger Company's charter was revoked and the British government took control, in a ceremony where Lugard read the proclamation. The Royal Niger Company was paid £865,000 and was given the rights to half of all mining revenue in a large part of the areas for 99 years in exchange for ceding the territory to the British government. Lugard was appointed the High Commissioner of the newly created Northern Nigeria Protectorate. Lokoja was the capital from 1900, but Zungeru became the headquarters for the protectorate in 1902 because it was the most northerly city accessible by river transport.

== Military campaign ==
Military operations began in 1902 and continued for about five years of sporadic fighting. The remnants of the Bornu Empire were conquered in 1902 and the Sokoto Caliphate and was defeated in the Battle of Kano. Fighting continued in 1904 in Bassa. In 1906, a Mahdist rebellion broke out outside the city of Sokoto in the village of Satiru. Elements of the Royal West African Frontier Force were dispatched to suppress the rebellion; upon hearing news of what had transpired, Muhammadu Attahiru II dispatched a mixed force of 300 Sokoto cavalry and infantry led by Mallam Isa to join them. The combined force successfully suppressed the rebellion, which marked the last major instance of armed resistance to British rule in the region. After 1907 there were fewer revolts and use of military force by the British and the focus of the High Commissioner turned toward taxation and administration.

== Administration ==
The British Administration began with Frederick Lugard as the first High Commissioner. In 1907, Lugard left Nigeria for Hong Kong and Percy Girouard became the new High Commissioner. Girouard had a long history of rail construction in Canada and Africa and was tasked with substantial railroad construction in the Protectorate. In 1909, Henry Hesketh Bell, the governor of the Uganda Protectorate was appointed high commissioner. In 1912, it was estimated that the area of Northern Nigeria was approximately 660,000 square kilometres (255,000 mi^{2}) and had a population of about 10 million people. Charles Lindsay Temple became the acting Head Commissioner in 1911 and 1912 and began overseeing, with close collaboration with Lugard, the creation of the Colony and Protectorate of Nigeria.

One defining characteristic of administration in Northern Nigeria Protectorate was the inclusion of chiefs and emirs—including the emir of Bornu—as "native authorities" fitting into British administration (cf. the similar practice with chiefs, rajas, and maharajas in British India). Taxation proved very difficult in the protectorate for the first years of British rule. Lugard's attempts to institute poll taxes were foiled by the Emirates, the need to introduce coin controversy and attempts to tax trade were opposed by powerful merchants. This created a substantial deficit in the budget of the Protectorate and public works projects had to be paid by grants from the British Empire. As a result, the British often had significant shortages of British personnel before 1907. These pragmatic concerns resulted in incorporation of the traditional authorities within the British structure.

These same financial and administrative challenges resulted in discussions led by Lugard for the unification of the Lagos Colony, the Southern Nigeria Protectorate, and Northern Nigeria. The disparities between the protectorates was to be corrected by creating a central administration in Lagos, with custom revenues from the south paying for the projects in the north. The unified Colony and Protectorate of Nigeria began in 1914 and had two lieutenant governors with one responsible for the area of the southern province and another responsible for the northern province. The administration in the north remained largely separate and included and deepened the use of native authorities. These divisions have been found to persist in many respects to this day.

== See also ==
- British West Africa
- Northern Nigeria Gazette
- Scramble for Africa
- Sir Richmond Palmer
