= Eswatini Government Gazette =

Eswatini Government Gazette is the official publication of the Government of Eswatini and publishes laws, ordinances and other regulations.

== See also ==
- List of government gazettes
