= Government Gazette of Kosovo =

Official Gazette of the Republic of Kosovo
- Type: Daily official journal
- Publisher: Government of Kosovo
- Headquarters: Kosovo
- Website: gzk.rks-gov.net

The Official Gazette of the Republic of Kosovo (Albanian: Gazeta Zyrtare e Republikës së Kosovës, Serbian: Službeni List Republike Kosovo) is the official publication of the Government of Kosovo and publishes laws, ordinances and other regulations.

== Published material ==
The Gazette includes proclamations by the President as well as both general and government notices made by its various departments. It publishes regulations and notices in terms of acts, changes of names, company registrations and de-registrations, financial statements, land restitution notices, liquor licence applications and transport permits. Board and legal notices are also published in the Gazette; these cover insolvencies, liquidation and estate notices.

== See also ==
- List of government gazettes
