= The Transvaal Government Gazette =

Government gazette of Transvaal Colony (1877–1881)

The Transvaal Government Gazette (Transvaalsche Gouvernements Courant) was the government gazette of Transvaal Colony between 1877, when Britain annexed the Zuid Afrikaanse Republiek (South African Republic) (ZAR), and the end of the First Boer War in 1881.

== See also ==
- List of British colonial gazettes
- Province of the Transvaal Official Gazette (from 1910)
