= Government Gazette of Brunei =

- Type: Daily official journal
- Publisher: Government of Brunei
- Headquarters: Brunei
- Website: agc.gov.bn/Lists/gazetteII/AllItems.aspx

The Brunei Darussalam Government Gazette is the official publication of the Government of Brunei and publishes laws, ordinances and other regulations.

== See also ==
- List of government gazettes
