= Government Office (Vietnam) =

Ministry-level agency

Socialist Republic of Vietnam Government Office
- Văn phòng Chính phủ

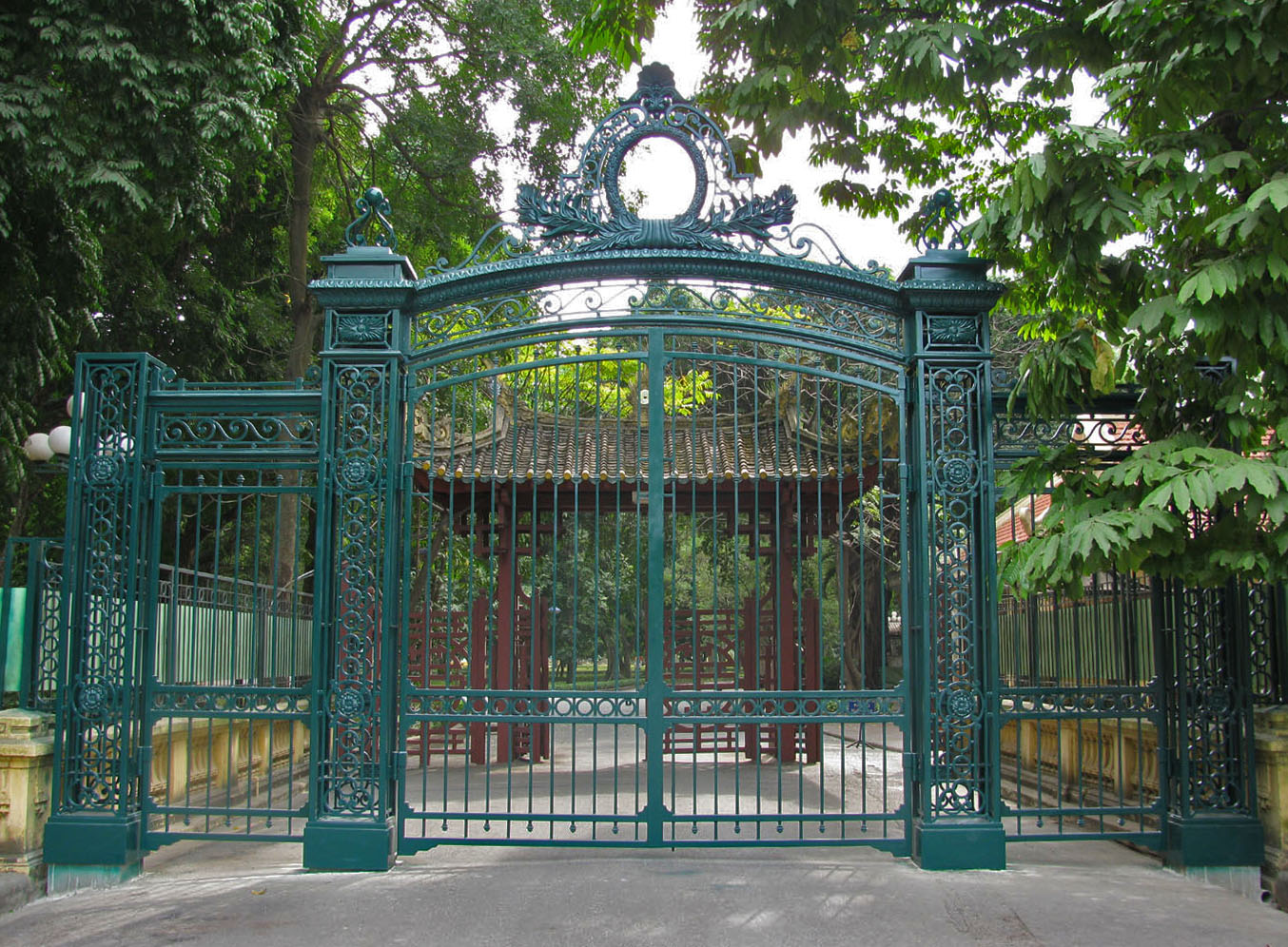
- The Red Gate

Ministry overview
- Formed: 28 August 1945 (de facto); 26 July 1960 (official)
- Preceding Ministry: Prime Minister Palace (1945-1987) Office of Prime Minister Palace (1971-1981) Office of Council of Ministers (1981-1987) Office of Prime Minister Palace (1987-1992) Government Office (1992-present)
- Type: Ministry-level Agency
- Jurisdiction: Government of Vietnam
- Headquarters: 1 Hoàng Hoa Thám Street, Ba Đình Ward, Hanoi
- Annual budget: Not published
- Ministry executives: Đặng Xuân Phong, Chief of the Government Office; Mai Thị Thu Vân, Deputy Chiefs of the Government Office; Đỗ Ngọc Huỳnh, Deputy Chiefs of the Government Office; Phạm Mạnh Cường, Deputy Chiefs of the Government Office; Đôn Tuấn Phong, Deputy Chiefs of the Government Office; Trần Anh Tiến, Deputy Chiefs of the Government Office; Nguyễn Danh Huy, Deputy Chiefs of the Government Office
- Website: vpcp.chinhphu.vn

The Government Office (Vietnamese: Văn phòng Chính phủ - VPCP) is a ministry-level agency in Vietnam that assists the Government and the Prime Minister. The Government Office is headed by a Chief, which is officially designated as the Minister-Chairman of Government Office (Bộ trưởng, Chủ nhiệm Văn phòng Chính phủ), being a minister-level position of the Vietnamese cabinet. The current Chief of the Government Office of Vietnam is Đặng Xuân Phong.

== Roles and functions ==
The Government Office has several roles and functions, notably:

- To assist the Government in organizing joint activities of the Government
- To assist the Prime Minister in leading, directing and operating activities of the Government and state administrative system from central to local levels
- To provide services for the direction and administration of the Government, the Prime Minister and to provide information to the public under the provisions of law
- To ensure the physical conditions and technical requirements for the activities of the Government and the Prime Minister.

== Departments ==
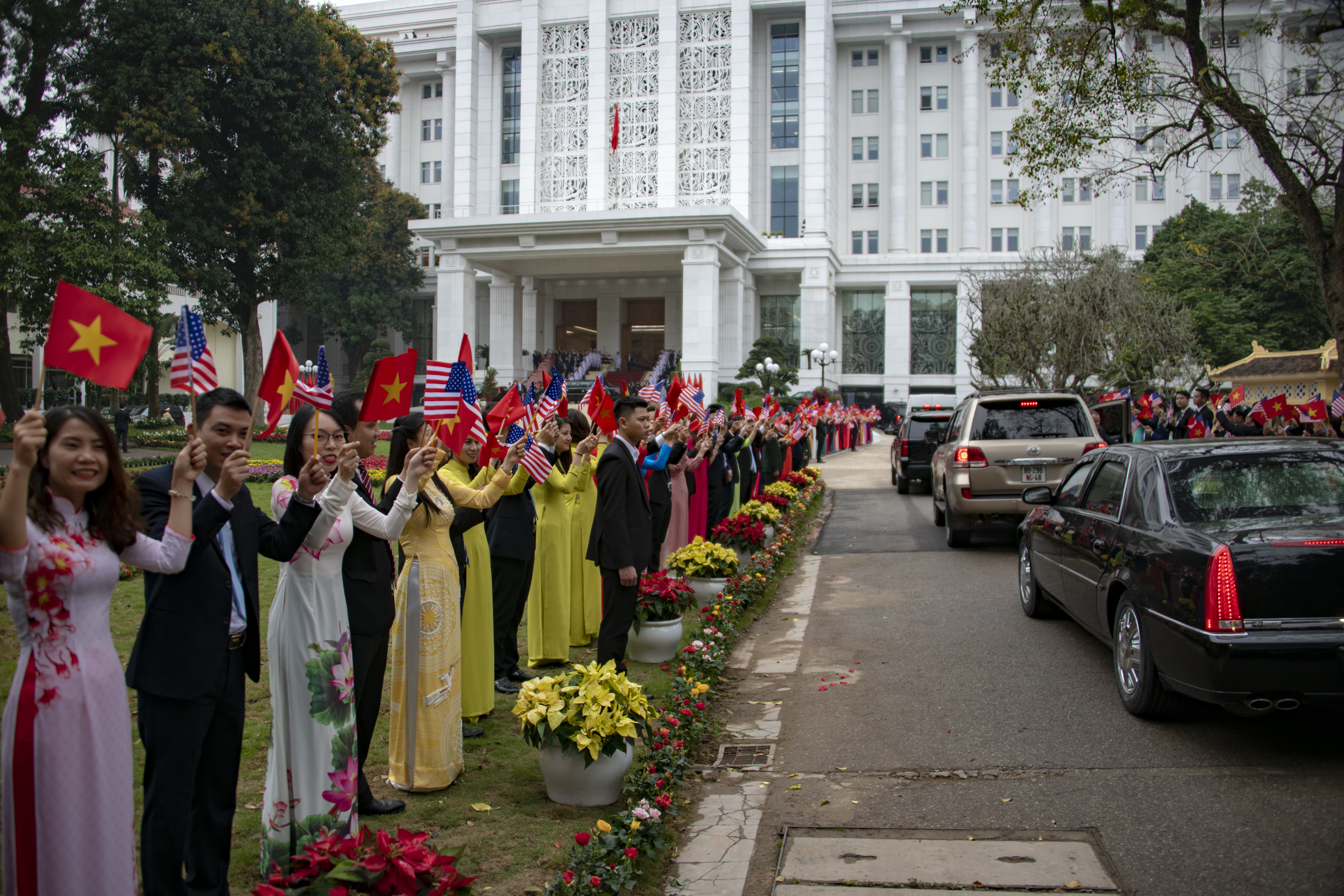
The Government Office as seen during SecState Pompeo's 2019 official visit to the country.

- Department of Complaint, Denunciation and Anti-corruption Monitoring (Department I)
- Department of Internal Affairs (Department II)
- Department of Central and Local Agencies Coordination Monitoring (Department III)
- Department of General Affairs
- Department of State Administrative Organization and Public Affairs
- Department of Legal Affairs
- Department of International Relations
- Department of Economic Sectors
- Department of General Economics
- Department of Science, Education, Culture and Social Affairs
- Department of Enterprise Innovation
- Department of Secretarial and Editorial Affairs
- Department of Administrative Archives
- Department of Organization and Personnel
- Department of Finance and Planning
- Bureau of Management
- Bureau of Administration and Management II
- Informatics Center
- Vietnam Government Portal (VGP)
