= Negri Sembilan Government Gazette =

Government gazette of Negeri Sembilan, Malaysia

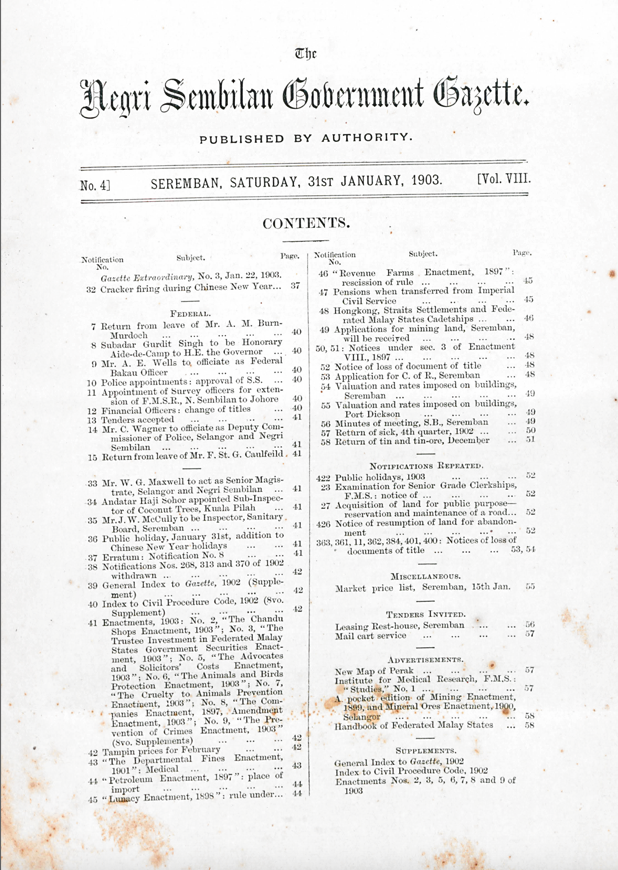
Front cover of Negri Sembilan Government Gazette. Issued on SATURDAY, 31ST JANUARY, 1903 in Seremban

The Negri Sembilan Government Gazette is the government gazette of Negeri Sembilan. It provides official notification of decisions or actions taken by, or information from, the government of Negeri Sembilan authorities, government departments, local councils, companies, and individuals.

The Negri Sembilan Government Gazette (today known as Negeri Sembilan Government Gazette) is published under authority of Percetakan Nasional Malaysia Berhad.

== History ==
Following the establishment of the Confederation of Negeri Sembilan in 1895, the first issue of the Negri Sembilan Government Gazette was published on 3 January 1896. This inaugural issue documented the state's early administrative framework, listing key official appointments such as Dr. Braddon as Residency Surgeon, Mr. H. Caldicott as Superintendent of Works and Surveys, and Mr. L. Cazalas as Superintendent of Surveys. At the time of its inception, the Gazette was printed by the Selangor Government Press.

== Sections ==
In general, notices published in the Negri Sembilan Government Gazette are organized into the following categories:

Federal notices

Items involving the Federated Malay States (F.M.S.) administration or high-ranking officials serving across multiple states:

- Appointments and Leaves
- Police and Survey Departments
- Financial and Tenders

Local administration

Notices specific to the state of Negeri Sembilan and its districts (Seremban, Kuala Pilah, Tampin, etc.):

- Judicial and Sanitary
- Public Holidays
- Price Lists and Revenue

Legislative and legal

Formal notices regarding the rule of law and official enactments:

- Enactments
- Land and Mining
- Orders in Council

Miscellaneous and advertisements

- Tenders Invited
- Educational and Scientific
- Notifications Repeated

Supplements

- Indices: General indices to previous volumes of the Gazette
- Special Supplements: Full texts of new Enactments or specific legal codes (e.g., Civil Procedure Code)
