= Federal Republic of Nigeria Official Gazette =

Nigerian periodical publication

Federal Republic of Nigeria Official Gazette is the government gazette for the Federal Republic of Nigeria. It has been published at Lagos since 1963 and replaced the Federation of Nigeria Official Gazette.
