= Cayman Islands Gazette =

Government gazette of the Cayman Islands

- Owner: Cayman Islands Government
- Website: www.gazettes.gov.ky

The Cayman Islands Gazette, sometimes referred to as The Gazette, is the government gazette of the Cayman Islands, published by the Government Information Service fortnightly on alternate Mondays, and on other occasions as ordered by the Governor.

Cayman Islands Gazette is published in George Town, Grand Cayman, and was known as the Cayman Gazette until 1997, the last issue under that title being published on 22 December 1997.

== See also ==
- List of British colonial gazettes
