= Official Journal of the Algerian Republic =

- Front page of a recent issue
- Type: Official journal
- Format: Online and print
- Owner: Government of Algeria
- Founder: Government of Algeria
- Publisher: Secretariat-General of the Government
- Founded: 6 July 1962
- Political alignment: None (official publication)
- Language: Arabic and French
- Headquarters: Algiers, Algeria
- ISSN: 0516-5989
- Website: www.joradp.dz/HEN/Index.htm

The Official Journal of the Algerian Republic (Arabic: الجريدة الرسمية للجمهورية الجزائرية الديموقراطية الشعبية) is the official gazette of record for the Government of Algeria. It publishes all laws, decrees, and official decisions adopted by the President of Algeria, the People's National Assembly, and other state institutions. It is issued by the Secretariat-General of the Government and made available both in Arabic and French. Only legal texts published in the Official Journal are considered legally binding in Algeria.

== History ==
Before Algeria's independence, the publication of legal texts concerning the territory, such as laws, decrees, and ordinances, was handled by the Recueil des actes administratifs de la Délégation générale du gouvernement. This publication had replaced the Official Journal of Algeria, which was first established on 7 January 1927.

Following the proclamation of independence on 5 July 1962, the Official Journal of the Algerian State (JOEA) was issued for the first time on 6 July 1962, one day after independence. Its first twelve-page issue was mainly devoted to the declaration of independence, publishing the results of the self-determination referendum of 1 July 1962 (with a typographical error showing “15 July”), as well as the letters exchanged between President Charles de Gaulle and Abderrahmane Farès, head of the Provisional Executive. On 26 October 1962, the publication officially became the Official Journal of the Algerian Democratic and Popular Republic (JORA).
