= Government Gazette (Zimbabwe) =

Zimbabwean Government Gazette is the official publication of the Government of Zimbabwe and publishes laws, ordinances and other regulations.

== See also ==
- List of government gazettes
