= Official Gazette (South Yemen) =

Government gazette of South Yemen

The Official Gazette (Arabic: al-Jaridah al-rasmiyah-Jumhuriyat al-Yaman al-dimuqratiyah al-Sha'biyah) was the government gazette of the People's Democratic Republic of Yemen (1967 to 1990). It was published at Aden in English and Arabic.

== See also ==
- List of government gazettes
