= Lovtidende =

Government gazette of Denmark

Lovtidende is the official law gazette of the legislative body of Denmark in which new legislation is announced. First published in the 1870s, it became available on the World Wide Web on 1 January 2008. The Danish Lovtidende (Law Times) and Statstidende (State Times) are the law gazettes of the legislative and executive bodies, respectively.
