= Prime Minister of Vietnam =

Head of government

Prime Minister of the Socialist Republic of Vietnam
- Thủ tướng Chính phủ nước Cộng hòa Xã hội chủ nghĩa Việt Nam
- Seal of the Government's Prime Minister

- Incumbent; Lê Minh Hưng since 7 April 2026
- Office of the Prime Minister
- Type: Head of government
- Status: Third highest ranking official
- Abbreviation: TTg / PM
- Member of: National Assembly of Vietnam; Central Military Commission; Central Police Party Commission; National Defense and Security Council; CPV Political Bureau; (by convention)
- Reports to: President; National Assembly
- Seat: Government Office
- Appointer: National Assembly
- Term length: Five years, renewable
- Inaugural holder: Phạm Văn Đồng
- Formation: 2 September 1945; 81 years ago
- Salary: 29,250,000₫ monthly
- Website: primeminister.chinhphu.vn

The prime minister of Vietnam (Vietnamese: Thủ tướng Chính phủ, lit. 'government premier') is the Head of Government of Vietnam who presides over the meetings of the Government. The prime minister directs the work of government members, and may propose deputy prime ministers to the National Assembly.

The head of government is responsible to the National Assembly and serves as the vice chairperson of the Council for Defence and Security. Prime minister is also the chairman of the Council for National Education, Standing Member of the Central Military Commission and the Central Police Party Committee. The tenure of a prime minister is five years, and the term is renewable once. In case of incapacity, a deputy prime minister assumes the office of acting prime minister until the prime minister resumes duty, or until the appointment of a new prime minister.

The powers and prestige of the prime minister have varied through the years. Phạm Văn Đồng, unified Vietnam's first prime minister, sometimes lamented that in practice he had little power. Since the death of Phạm Hùng in 1988, the prime minister has been ranked third in the order of precedence of the Communist Party's Politburo, the highest decision-making body in Vietnam, and is now having a major practical influence as the direct head of the executive government.

== History ==
Ho Chi Minh, who also served as the country's president, was appointed Vietnam's first prime minister in 1946 by the National Assembly, after having served months as the acting chairman of the Provisional Government and foreign minister in the aftermath of the 1945 August Revolution. The 1946 and 1959 constitutions state that the National Assembly had the power to appoint and relieve the prime minister of their duties. The prime minister presided over the Council of Ministers, the highest executive body of state, from 1981 until it was renamed to Government in the 1992 constitution. The office of prime minister was renamed in the 1980 constitution to that of Chairman of the Council of Ministers.

Phạm Văn Đồng, served as North Vietnamese prime minister from 1955 until 1976, when he became prime minister of a unified Vietnam, and then until 1987, when he resigned. At his resignation, he was the longest-serving prime minister in Vietnamese history, and the oldest serving prime minister in the world. He sometimes lamented that he was one of the world's weakest prime ministers, on one occasion saying; "I can do nothing. When I say something, nobody listens. If I propose changing a deputy minister, it turns out to be impossible. I cannot even choose my own ministers." Since the death of Phạm Hùng in 1988, the prime minister has been ranked third in the order of precedence of the Communist Party's Politburo.

== Duties, powers and responsibilities ==
The National Assembly by a proposal of the president of Vietnam elects the prime minister. The prime minister is responsible to the National Assembly, and the Assembly elects all ministers to government. Activity reports by the prime minister must be given to the National Assembly, while the Standing Committee of the National Assembly supervises the activities of the Central Government and the prime minister. Finally, the deputies of the National Assembly have the right to question the prime minister and other members of government.

The prime minister is the only member of government who must be a member of the National Assembly. This is because the prime minister is accountable to the National Assembly, and they reports to it, or to its Standing Committee, and to the president. The prime minister issues directives and supervises the implementation of formal orders given by the president, the National Assembly or the Standing Committee. Cabinet members and members of the Central Government in general are responsible to the prime minister and the National Assembly for the fields they specialise in. According to the Constitution of Vietnam, the following are the duties, powers and responsibilities of the prime minister:

- To head the Central Government, and direct the works of members of the Central Government, the People's Councils at all levels and to chair the meetings of the Cabinet;
- To propose to the National Assembly that ministries, or organs with ministerial rank, be established or dissolved; to present to the National Assembly or, when the latter is not in session, to its Standing Committee, for approval, proposals on the appointment, release from duty, or dismissal of deputy prime ministers, cabinet ministers and other members of the Government;
- To appoint, release from duty, or dismiss deputy ministers and officials of equal rank; to approve the election, release from duty, secondment and dismissal of chairmen and deputy chairmen of People's Committees of provinces and cities under direct central rule;
- To suspend or annul decisions, directives and circulars of cabinet ministers and other Government members, decisions and directives of People's Councils and chairmen of People's Committees of provinces and cities under direct central rule that contravene the Constitution, the law, or other formal written documents of superior State organs;
- To suspend the execution of resolutions of People's Councils of provinces and cities under direct central rule that contravene the Constitution, the law, or the formal written orders of superior State organs; at the same time to propose to the Standing Committee of the National Assembly to annul them;
- To make regular reports to the people through the mass media on major issues to be settled by the Government.
- When the prime minister is absent, they must choose one of their deputy prime ministers to direct the work of the government.

The prime minister serves concurrently as the secretary of the CPV Government Caucus Commission. The National Assembly chairman serves as the commission's deputy. Commission members are appointed by the Politburo, and the commission itself is responsible to the Politburo and the Secretariat. The decision-making process within the commission is based on the principles of collective leadership.

== Bibliography ==
- Menétrey-Monchau, Cécile (2006). American–Vietnamese relations in the Wake of War: Diplomacy after the Capture of Saigon, 1975–1979. McFarland. ISBN 9780786423989.
