= Cape of Good Hope Government Gazette =

Government gazette of Cape Colony

The Cape of Good Hope Government Gazette was the government gazette of Cape Colony.

It was published in Cape Town between 7 June 1826 and May 1910, and was continued by the Province of Cape of Good Hope Official Gazette when Cape Colony became the Province of the Cape of Good Hope.

== See also ==
- List of British colonial gazettes
