= Government Gazette of the Protectorate of Southern Nigeria =

Official journal published 1900 to 1906

The flag of the Protectorate of Southern Nigeria

The Government Gazette of the Protectorate of Southern Nigeria was the government gazette for the Protectorate of Southern Nigeria. It was published at Old Calabar between 1900 and 1906.

Southern Nigeria was a British protectorate in the coastal areas of modern-day Nigeria, formed in 1900 from union of the Niger Coast Protectorate with territories chartered by the Royal Niger Company below Lokoja on the Niger River.

It was continued by the Southern Nigeria Government Gazette when Southern Nigeria became the Colony and Protectorate of Southern Nigeria in 1906.

== See also ==
- List of British colonial gazettes
