= Government Gazette of the Republic of Namibia =

Official journal of the government of Namibia

- Type: Weekly official journal
- Founded: March 21, 1990
- Language: English
- Headquarters: Namibia
- OCLC number: 311578689

The Government Gazette, abbreviated GG and referred to as the Gazette, is the official journal of the government of Namibia that contains government agency rules, proposed rules, and public notices. Every bill must be published in terms of Article 56 of the Namibian Constitution in order to acquire the status of an Act of Parliament. The Gazette is published weekly, every Friday, except on Namibian holidays. Then the issue shall be published on the preceding Thursday.

== Contents ==
In essence, the Government Gazette is a way for the government to announce changes to government requirements, policies and guidance to the public. Publication of documents in the Federal Register also constitutes constructive notice, and its contents are judicially noticed.

- Final rules
- Changes to existing rules
- Presidential documents including Executive orders, proclamations and administrative orders.

== Format ==
Each weekly issue of the printed Government Gazette is organized into categories:

- Presidential Documents (executive orders and proclamations)
- Rules and Regulations (including policy statements and interpretations of rules by federal agencies)
- Notices (such as scheduled hearings and meetings open to the public and grant applications)

Citations from the Gazette are [volume] GG [page number] ([date]), e.g., 5116 GG 1 (Jan. 4, 2013).

== Availability ==
To purchase current or back print copies of the Government gazette, one may contact Solitaire Press (Pty) Ltd., corner of Bonsmara and Brahman Streets, Northern Industrial Area, P.O. Box 1155, Windhoek. Copies are kept in stock for two years. Each individual issue may be priced from N$4 to N$40 depending on its pages and can be purchased from Solitaire Press (Pty) Ltd., same address in Windhoek. The subscription is N$3,050-00 including VAT per annum, obtainable from Solitaire Press (Pty) Ltd.

=== Free sources ===
The Government gazette is available online. The national Library and the University of Namibia also receive copies of the text, either in paper or microfiche format. Outside Namibia, major libraries in South Africa also carry the Government gazette.

== History ==
The Government gazette system of publication was created 23 March 1990 with the Independence of Namibia 1990.

== See also ==
- Government gazette – for other similar government publications in other countries
