= Victoria Government Gazette =

Government gazette of Victoria, Australia

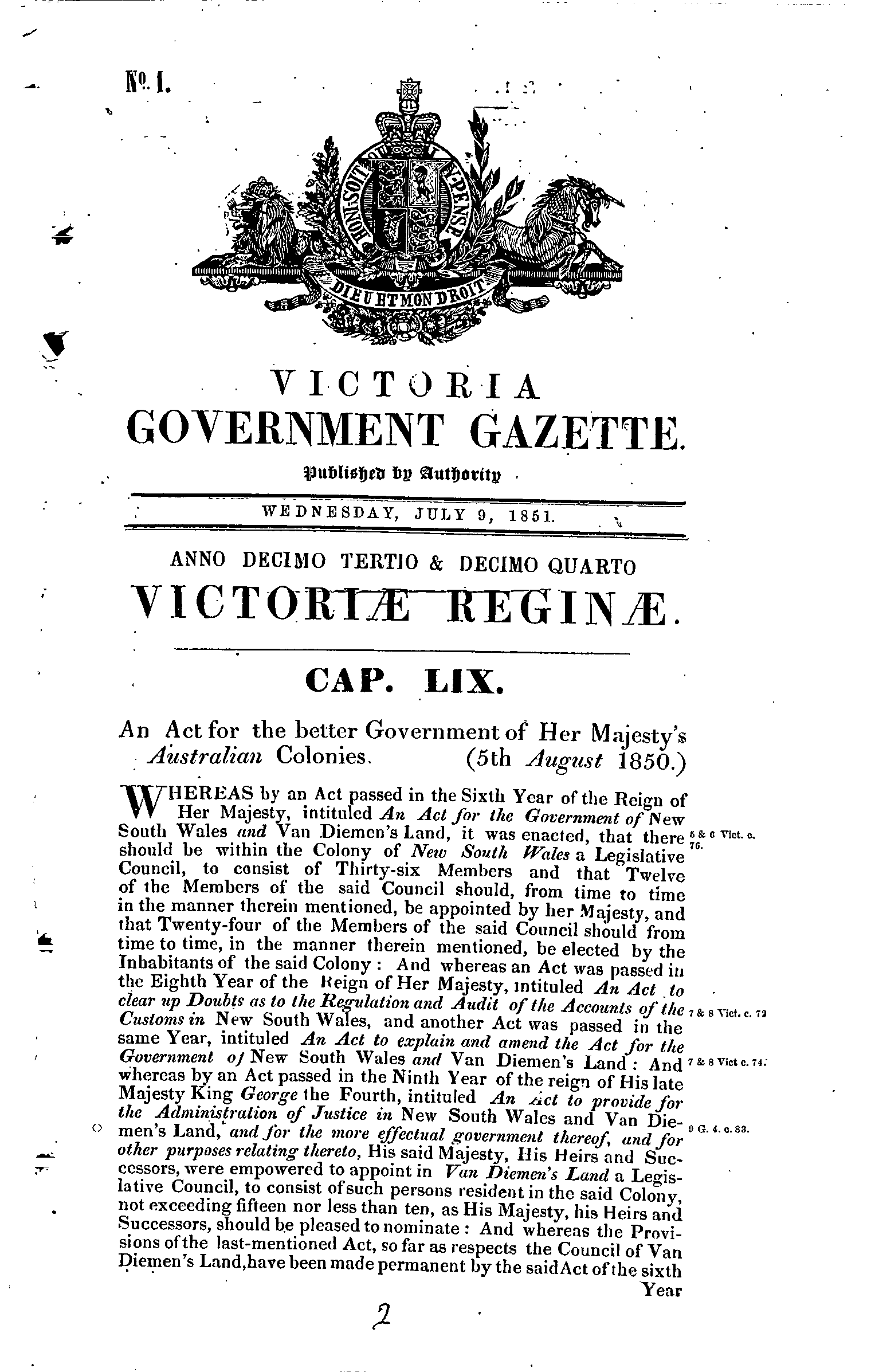
Front cover of the first issue, 9 July 1851

The Victoria Government Gazette is the government gazette of Victoria. It provides official notification of decisions or actions taken by, or information from, the Governor of Victoria, Victoria State Government authorities, government departments, local councils, companies, and individuals.

The Victoria Government Gazette is published by IVE Group Limited, under authority of the Victorian Government Printer.

== History ==
Following the establishment of the first permanent settlement in what is now Victoria in 1834, the Port Phillip District was established as an administrative division of the Colony of New South Wales. As such, the government business relating to the district were published in the New South Wales Government Gazette. This continued until 1851 with the passage of the Australian Colonies Government Act (1850), which formally separated the Port Phillip District from New South Wales to form the Colony of Victoria on the 2nd of July 1851. From 1851 onwards, government business was, and continues to be, published in the Victorian Government Gazette. Gazettes from this period until 1997 can be accessed through the Victorian State Library. Those published after 1997 can be accessed on the Government Gazette website.

== Sections ==
In general, notices published in the Victoria Government Gazette fall into one of the following categories:

Private Notices

- Dissolution of partnerships
- Creditors notices
- Sales by the Sheriff

Proclamations by the Governor

- Acts of Parliament
- Commencement of Acts

Government & Outer Budget Sector Agencies Section

- Council Notices, road discontinuances and local laws
- Council Planning Scheme Amendments
- State Trustees
- Exemptions (by VCAT)
- Sales of Crown Land
- Acts & notices required under particular Acts
- Infrastructure (Departmental notices of Planning Scheme Amendments)

Orders in Council

- Orders signed by the Governor in Council
