= Nyasaland Government Gazette =

Government gazette of Nyasaland

The Nyasaland Government Gazette was the government gazette of Nyasaland.

The Gazette was published between October 1907 and 3 July 1964. Copies may be found in the collections of the British Library. It was replaced by the Malawi government gazette when Nyasaland became independent from Britain as Malawi.

== See also ==
- List of British colonial gazettes
