= Statstidende =

Government gazette of Denmark

Statstidende (lit.: Tidings of the State) is a government gazette of Denmark, first published in 1904. It was originally published by the Prime Minister's Office, but since 1964 by the Justice Ministry and since 2005, solely published on the Internet.

Statstidende primarily consists of notifications with legal effect on citizens, companies, and government organisations and bodies. Secondly it contains new information from the Parliament of Denmark, the national administrative bodies, and the EU. It is accompanied by Tingbladet (lit.: The Thing Magazine), which contains public announcements of administrative events (such as selling and buying of private property). The Danish government also maintains Lovtidende, another official journal concerned specifically with acts of the Parliament

Announcements in Statstidende are of legal validity, like official announcements by the government. Until 1947 Statstidende was the only media to hold this distinction, but the same right was extended to the radio news broadcasts of Danmarks Radio, due to a national strike among typographers in Denmark.

== External sources ==
- Statstidende on the internet (in Danish)
