= Official Gazette (Barbados) =

Government gazette of Barbados

The Official Gazette is the government gazette of Barbados. It has been published within Bridgetown since 1966.

== See also ==
- List of British colonial gazettes
- The Courier (ACP-EU), an ACP-EU development magazine focusing on ACP-EU cooperation.
