= Government Gazette of the State of New South Wales =

- Cover page of Government Gazette of the State of New South Wales, 4 November 1902
- Language: English

Publication details
- Publisher: Government of New South Wales (Australia)

Standard abbreviations
- ISO 4: Gov. Gaz. State N. S. W.

The Government Gazette of the State of New South Wales, also known as the New South Wales Government Gazette, is the government gazette of the Government of New South Wales in Australia. The Gazette is managed by the New South Wales Parliamentary Counsel's Office.

== History ==
The first Government Gazette of the State of New South Wales was published in 1832. Prior to the publication of the first issue of the Gazette on 7 March 1832, official notices were published in the Sydney Gazette and New South Wales Advertiser. The articles in the Gazette include official notices from municipal councils and government departments about the naming of roads and the acquisition of land as well as changes to legislation and government departments in New South Wales.

Government notices, regulations, forms and orders relating to the Port Phillip District were published in the Government Gazette of the State of New South Wales until Victoria separated from New South Wales in 1851.

The Gazette has been published online from 2001 and from 1 January 2014, the print edition is no longer published and it is available only as an online edition.

== Digitisation ==
The Gazette has been digitised by the National Library of Australia.

== See also ==
- List of government gazettes
- List of newspapers in Australia
- List of newspapers in New South Wales
