= The Official Gazette of Guyana =

Government gazette of Guyana

Official Gazette of Guyana
- Country: Guyana
- Language: English
- Website: officialgazette.gov.gy

The Official Gazette of Guyana is the government gazette of Guyana.

The Gazette is believed to have been introduced to Guyana by Dutch colonists in the seventeenth century and until 2012 had no statutory footing in Guyanese law, despite many matters being required to be published in it by law. In that year a bill, the Official Gazette Bill 2012, was introduced into the Guyanese National Assembly by Mohabir Anil Nandlall MP, the Attorney General and Minister of Legal Affairs, to put the Gazette on a sound legal basis.

== See also ==
- List of British colonial gazettes
