= Agter Elke Man =

Television series

- Created by: Franz Marx
- Country of origin: South Africa
- No. of seasons: 2
- No. of episodes: 51 (list of episodes)

Production
- Running time: 25 / 45 minutes

Original release
- Network: TV1
- Release: 5 September 1985 – 10 November 1988

Agter Elke Man is a television drama series which premiered on 5 September 1985 on the SABC's TV1 and concluded on 10 November 1988. The series focuses on the lives of the women behind a number of successful men. Two series were aired, and the second series was followed by a movie, titled Agter Elke Man, which was released on 28 September 1990.

== Characters ==
=== Main characters ===
- Marietjie Barnhoorn (Christine Basson)
- Andries Barnhoorn (Andre Verster)
- Wessel Barnhoorn (Glen Bosman)
- Mercia Meyer (Rika Sennett)
- Anna Meyer (Anna Richter-Visser)
- Leana Steyn / Jooste / Beyers (Cyrilene Slabbert)
- Stienie Steyn (Dulsie van den Bergh)
- Doreen van Langhans (Kim de Beer)
- Sarie van Langhans (Annelize van der Ryst)
- Steve Anderson (Deon van Zyl)
- Kobus Dreyer (Franz Marx)
- Hettie (Hannah Botha)
- Herman Celliers (Eghard van der Hoven)
- Suzie Bruwer (Sulette Thompson)
- Bruce Beyers (Steve Hofmeyr)
- Annette Malan (Elizabeth Archer)
- Johan Malan (Andreas Jordaan)
- Tersia Hofmeyer (Riana Wilkens)
- Willie Snyders (Richard van der Westhuizen)

=== Recurring characters ===
- Wynand Toerien (Deon Coetzee)
- Annemarie Barnhoorn (Almarene Visser)
- Albert Jooste (Pierre de Wet)
- Mev. Simpson (Magda van Biljon)
- Mnr. Vlok (Louis van Niekerk)
- Mev. Duvenhage (Hermien Dommisse)
- Hannes Sierberhagen (Johan Malherbe)
- Elzetta (Dot Feldman)
- Mnr Myburg
- Tannie Barkhuizen (Naomie van Niekerk)
- Tallulah, Steve's Secretary (Alida Theron)
- Mnr. van Breda (Michal Grobbelaar)
- Boet Bryce, Bruce's Father (Carel Trichardt)
- Bryce Mother (Petru Wessels)
- William Beyers, Bruce's brother (Johan Scholtz)
- Santie Beyers, William's wife (Liesl van den Berg)
- Willie Smit (Willie Jansen)
- Hans van Langhans (Dirk Graceland)
- Jack Steyn (Scot Scott)
- Weltehagen (At Botha)
- Tannie Piet (Tilana Hanekom)
- Koot Hofmeyer (Pieter de Bruyn)

== Episodes ==
Season	Timeslot	Season Premiere	Season Finale
1	Thursday 7.25 P.M. - 8.00 P.M. (5 September 1985 – 27 March 1986 Tuesday 4.05 P.M. - 4.35 P.M. (10 September 1985 – 1 April 1986)	5 September 1985	27 March 1986
2	Thursday 7.05 P.M. - 8.00 P.M.(10 March – 10 November 1988 "Mondays 8:00 P.M - 9 P.M (29 November 2015 – 1 August 2016)	10 November 1988	

== See also ==
- List of South African television series
