= Amanda Strydom =

South African singer

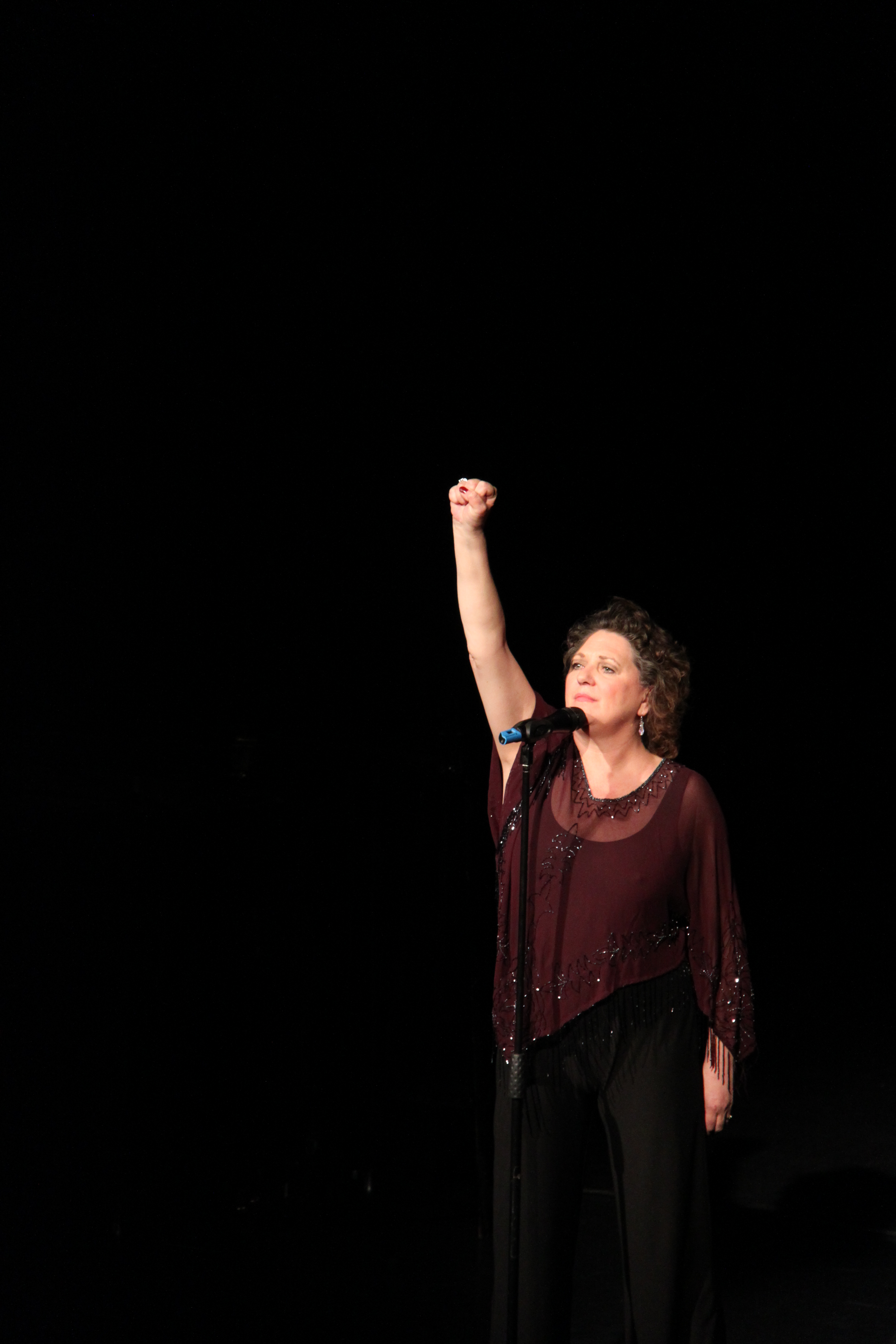
- Born: Amanda Strydom; 23 July 1956 (age 70); Port Elizabeth, South Africa
- Education: University of Pretoria
- Occupations: Singer and songwriter

Amanda Strydom (born 23 July 1956) is a South African singer and songwriter. Although she is known best for her singing, Strydom has also been active as a playwright and actress, most notably in cabaret and television.

== Biography ==
=== Early life ===
Strydom was born in the city of Port Elizabeth where she lived and went to school, matriculating from Framesby High School in 1974. She had no formal music training during her childhood (nor did she at any other time in her life) and she can't read a note of music, but she was an active participant in school choirs, and also learnt drama at the Children's Theatre with Mari Mocke and Marlene Pieterse. Strydom pursued a tertiary education at the University of Pretoria where she graduated in 1978 with a Bachelor of Arts degree, specialising in drama.

=== Early career ===
In 1979, she wrote her first song Ek loop die Pad (I walk the Road) after being urged to do so by friends. The song quickly found its audience and has remained popular ever since, even being covered by artists like Laurika Rauch. Strydom has since written most of the songs in her repertoire and discography, but she also sings songs by artists such as Koos du Plessis, Stef Bos, José Feliciano, Kris Kristofferson, Holly Cole, and George Gershwin. When writing her own songs Strydom usually composes the lyrics alone, while often collaborating with others when composing the music. Among her musical collaborators are Janine Neethling, Didi Kriel, Lize Beekman, Peter McLea, Siegfried Pretsch and Angerie van Wyk.

Also in 1979, Strydom began working for the Cape Provincial Arts Board (Capab) where she starred in theatre pieces such as Die Wonderwerk (The Miracle) and "Kinkels innie kabel" (Hitches in the Cable). In the same year she also began freelancing as an actress, cabaret singer, disc jockey, television presenter and writer, this all after winning the lead role motion picture by Franz Marx, called Pasgetroud (Just Married). In 1980 she was engaged as a singer for the television programme Musiek en Liriek, together with a large group of her colleagues in the Afrikaans music industry. This programme would turn out to have a lasting impact on the development of Afrikaans popular music being, in the words of Jannie du Toit, a kind of "belated folk revolution". Strydom also began working as a disc jockey in that year, for both Highveld Stereo and Radio 5. She also landed the female lead role in Potato Eaters, an English television drama.

Johannesburg's famous Market Theatre was the venue for her first performance in one of Hennie Aucamp's cabarets, Met Permissie Gesê (Said With Permission). This was in 1981. She also presented the character Grace Lipschitz in Hell is for Whites Only, which was written by Pieter-Dirk Uys. She also performed in Siener in die Suburbs for the official opening of the State Theatre in Pretoria. The following year saw her singing on tour with David Kramer.

Well established in various industries by 1983, Strydom starred in various plays and television series in the following years. She also released her first Afrikaans LP in 1983, titled Vir my Familie (For my Family), as well as her first English LP in 1985, titled Jupiter Jones is Amanda. One of the roles she created for television was that of a Polish singer called Elzbieta Karski, for John Cundill's English television series 1922. For her performance she won the Star Tonight award for best English actress in 1985. She also began performing as a solo cabaret artist, at Garbo's in Cape Town and at Club 58 in Hillbrow.

The writer Hennie Aucamp had an enormous influence on Strydom's development as a cabaret singer, and she still acknowledges him as her mentor. Merwede van der Merwe was another teacher. With the help of these men she sang in such social commentaries as Die Lewe is 'n Grenshotel (Life is a Hotel on the Border), a work whose title alludes to the South African Border War in Angola. This time in Strydom's career proved instrumental in shaping her own voice as one of dissent from the over-riding moral and political opinions of Afrikaners of that time. In her own words: "Daar was 'n oorlog in Angola, en ons het daaroor gesing, gespot, gepraat; nie net daaroor nie, oor sensuur, oor die liefde. Ons is in ons stockings en sykouse en fishnets en shorts. In Afrikaans het ons oor daai verhoog gespring en oor dit wat dekadent en die lewe is 'n pad begin baan vir wat mense vandag in die land kabaret noem". (There was a war in Angola, and we sang about it, mocked it, and talked about it; not only about that, but about censorship, and love. We were in our stockings and fishnets and shorts. In Afrikaans we jumped on that stage and laid the foundation for what people today call cabaret in this country.) However, her disillusionment with cabaret followed later when television directors and producers were asking her and others to sing translated American songs from musicals like Ebb and Kander's Cabaret. Singing these American songs in forced translation irritated Strydom so much that she decided to go her own way as a solo performer again, so that she could once again sing songs in their intended vernacular.

=== The Amandla! incident ===
Strydom achieved notoriety in 1986 for giving the black power salute after one of her songs in her cabaret at the Oude Libertas Hall in Stellenbosch. This salute was intimately associated with the black struggle and is still used as a call by black political leaders to this day. (The speaker would shout Amandla! raising his right fist in the air, to which an informed or sympathetic crowd would respond Ngawethu!) At the height of P.W. Botha's presidency it would have been taboo for any white Afrikaans woman to use this salute on stage in front of a white-only audience. Consequently, Amanda Strydom was soon referred to as Amandla Strydom in popular culture. Strydom uses the black salute on stage to this day and even occasionally refers to herself as Amandla.

Shortly after this scandal Strydom was facing her own private struggle with bipolar depression, something she has written about honestly in her play In Full Light, and in the song Strydom/Amandla. She worked very little between 1988 and 1990. It is worthwhile to note that Strydom's depression coincided with a very traumatic time in the history of her country, and also that she returned to public life at the same time that apartheid was being dismantled. In 1991 she worked again, performing the cabaret Midnite Ladies at the venue After Dark in Pretoria, and she also acted on television in the Afrikaans series Arende and in the English series Big Time. Then, in the next year, she worked as a television presenter for NNTV, which was then still a subsidiary of the SABC.

=== State of the Heart and beyond ===
Strydom's career took a new path in 1993 when she staged a one-woman show which she had written by herself at the Klein Karoo Nasionale Kunstefees/KKNK (The Little Karoo National Arts Festival). The show was called State of the Heart. It became a regular performance piece in her repertoire, and it won her a Dalro Award and an Evening Post Award. She also released a CD of the cabaret's songs, called Songs from State of the Heart.

The Incredible Journey of Tinkerbell van Tonder was her next one-woman-show, which she performed at the State Theatre in Pretoria, at the Grahamstown Festival, and at the Opera House in her hometown, Port Elizabeth. She has released a CD under the same title, with songs recorded from the cabaret.

Strydom's third one-woman show was conceived at a time when theatres, companies and orchestras across South Africa were losing their funding from the state, money that the government planned to use on necessary social redevelopment rather than on the arts. Diva was Strydom's take on this issue, a work in which she pleaded for the integrity and worth of the arts in South Africa. In 1995 she toured the country with this production, performing it at the KKNK, at the State Theatre in Pretoria, at the Opera House in Port Elizabeth, and the Andre Huguenot Theatre in Bloemfontein. In the same year the television channel SABC2 aired a documentary about her life and career, and in the next year this same channel filmed and broadcast Diva to the nation.

Her next project was Vrou by die Spieël (Woman at the Mirror), her third CD which she created in collaboration with Didi Kriel and Lize Beekman. She also created a successful concert programme of her own songs, called Strydom in Concert. In a prolific year (1997) Strydom toured Belgium with Vrou by die Spieël and State of the Heart, staged the same works at arts festivals in South Africa, and also created the cabaret 'n Vuur gevang in Glas using texts by Hennie Aucamp. She performed 'n Vuur gevang in Glas at the KKNK and also released a CD recording of its songs. Further, she performed all four of her one woman shows alternately over a period of three weeks at the State Theatre in Pretoria.

Her fifth CD album, Hotel Royale, was arranged in collaboration with Peter McLea and Didi Kriel, and released in 1998. She arranged it into a concert programme for KKNK the following year, and also created two other programmes called C'est Moi and In Full Flight for various festivals in the country. She then wrote her play Hartlied to be performed at the Aardklop festival in Potchefstroom. In 2000 she performed together with her friend Elzabé Zietsman in a cabaret titled Strydom en Zietsman – in alfabetiese volgorde (Strydom and Zietsman – in alphabetical order), and also hosted a European travel documentary for the Afrikaans satellite television channel, KykNet.

Strydom's most prolific year may very well have been in 2001, when she wrote and performed four new theatre productions and recorded and released two new CD albums. The theatre productions were Ligvoets (Lightfooted), Die Taal van my Hart (The Language of my Heart), Jazz vir jou en 'n bietjie Blou (Jazz for you and a bit of Blue) and Meisie sings the Blues (Girl sings the Blues). The CD albums were Op 'n Klein Blou Ghoen (On a Small Blue Marble) and a compilation of the show Jazz vir jou en 'n bietjie blou (Jazz for you and a bit of Blue). In the same year she was also attacked viciously by three Rotweillers, but was consoled when Nelson Mandela paid her a personal visit after hearing of the incident.

In the following year Strydom was inspired to write Volstoom (Full Steam), a funeral cabaret, which she then premiered at the Aardklop festival in Potchefstroom. She performed her show All by Myself at the Pink Loerie Festival and also at the performance venue on Broadway in Cape Town. Three South African magazines approached Strydom to perform in concert extravaganzas that they were arranging; Huisgenoot invited her to sing in Sun City at their prestigious Skouspel concert, Rooi Rose invited her to sing in Al Daai Jazz (All That Jazz), and Sarie invited her to perform with others in their Inspirasie (Inspiration) concerts. Strydom also won two FNB Vita awards for her work on Op 'n Klein Blou Ghoen.

Then, in 2003, Strydom conceived a solo performance and CD album in collaboration with Floors Oosthuizen, Janine Neethling and Vinnie Henrico, which they called Verspreide Donderbuie/Scattered Thunder, a project for which Strydom eventually won two Geraasmusiek awards and a SAMA award. She had two further honours in that year: first, she was honoured by her alma mater, the University of Pretoria with their Tuks Alumni Laureate Award, and secondly, she was invited to attend the historic 85th birthday celebrations of Nelson Mandela in Sandton, Johannesburg. The singer also remembered one of her friends, the late Johannes Kerkorrel, by singing in two remembrance concerts. The first was Hommage a Kerkorrel, performed with Stef Bos at the Stadskouburg in Bruges, Belgium. And then she also sang a tribute she had written for Kerkorrel, the moving song Ek het gedroom (I dreamt), in Pretoria's State Theatre for the Kerkorrel tribute concert Een jaar later (One year later).

Kaalvoet was launched in the following year, a book with lyrics (or poetry) of her songs and photographs from her career. She also helped to rase funds for the Elijah School Fundraising Project by performing her first one-woman show State of Heart in Jeffreys Bay. Together with Christopher she has created Plakboek (Scrapbook) which she performed at Caesars in Johannesburg as well as at the KKNK with fellow singer Laurika Rauch.

Strydom has also branched into singing Latin American music. In Potchefstroom she was featured as the soloist for Ariel Ramírez's Missa Criola. The work, originally conceived for the tenor voice, proved well-suited to Strydom's own contralto voice, much the same as it did for the Argentinian singer Mercedes Sosa who recorded it in 1999.

=== Recent work ===
Strydom's career shows no signs of waning. In recent years she has remained active on the festival scene in South Africa, which is an integral part of any performance career in that country. She sang with the University of Pretoria Symphony Orchestra at the centenary celebrations of her alma mater. The Low Countries have also seen her performing regularly on their stages, singing at venues like the Koninklijk Teater Carré in September 2008. Another tour of the Netherlands and Belgium is also planned for 2009. Her most recent CD albums include 'n Rugsak vol Robyne (A Rucksackk full of Rubies) released in 2005 and Kerse teen die donker (Candles against the dark) released in 2008. She is also working on a new project with Lize Beekman.

== Discography ==
- Songs from State of the Heart 1995
- The Incredible Journey of Tinkerbell van Tonder 1995
- Vrou by die Spieël 1996
- 'n Vuur gevang in Glas 1997
- Hotel Royale 1998
- Ek Loop Die Pad, 20 Jaar 2000
- Op 'n Klein Blou Ghoen 2001
- Jazz vir jou en 'n bietjie Blou 2002
- Verspreide Donderbuie/Scattered Thunder 2003
- 'n Rugsak vol Robyne 2005
- Briewe Uit Die Suide 2007
- Kerse Teen Die Donker 2008
- Stroomop 2010
