= Hillbrow =

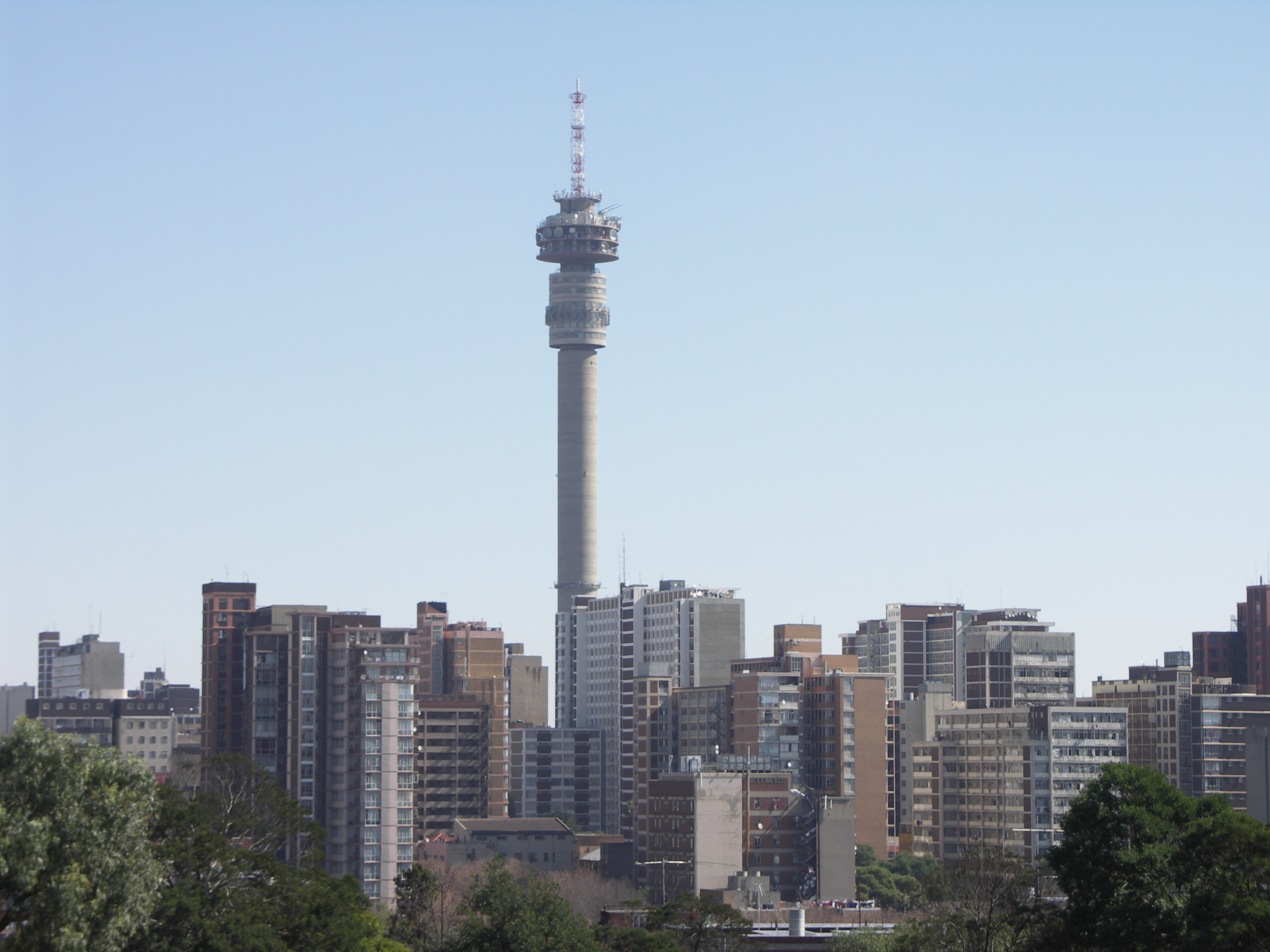
- Hillbrow and the Hillbrow Tower

- Location within Gauteng Location within South Africa
- Coordinates: 26°11′20″S 28°2′56″E
- Country: South Africa
- Province: Gauteng
- Municipality: City of Johannesburg
- Established: 1894

Area
  - Total: 1.08 km^{2} (0.42 sq mi)

Population (2011)
  - Total: 74,131
  - Density: 68,600/km^{2} (178,000/sq mi)

Racial makeup (2011)
  - Black African: 98.3%
  - Coloured: 0.9%
  - Indian/Asian: 0.3%
  - White: 0.4%
  - Other: 0.2%

First languages (2011)
  - Zulu: 36.7%
  - Southern Ndebele: 16.1%
  - English: 9.7%
  - Northern Sotho: 7.1%
  - Other: 30.4%
- Time zone: UTC+2 (SAST)
- Postal code (street): 2001
- PO box: 2038
- Area code: 010

Hillbrow ( /ˈhɪlbroʊ/) is an Inner City residential neighbourhood of Johannesburg, Gauteng, South Africa. It is characterized by a high population density and has experienced issues associated with municipal disinvestment, including elevated levels of unemployment, poverty, prostitution, and crime.

Under the Group Areas Act during apartheid, Hillbrow was initially designated a "whites-only" area. It later became a "grey area", where residents of different ethnic backgrounds lived together. During this period, it developed a reputation as a cosmopolitan neighbourhood with a politically progressive character and was one of the first recognized queer neighborhoods in South Africa.

For much of the twentieth century, Hillbrow had a significant Jewish community and was home to several Orthodox synagogues, including the Great Synagogue and Poswohl Synagogue. Temple Israel, the oldest Reform synagogue in South Africa, continues to operate.

Following the end of apartheid, population growth, white flight, and socio-economic pressures contributed to rising crime rates and a decline in infrastructure maintenance. During the 1980s and 1990s, many wealthier residents left the area, and numerous buildings fell into disrepair.

Today, Hillbrow is home to large numbers of immigrants, particularly from Zimbabwe, Mozambique, and Nigeria, alongside residents from local townships. Urban regeneration initiatives are underway. The Johannesburg Art Gallery, located in Joubert Park, houses the most extensive public collection of contemporary art on sub-Saharan Africa, including the works of Gerard Sokoto and William Kentridge.

== History ==
Prior to the discovery of gold on the Witwatersrand in 1886, the area that later became Hillbrow was located on government-owned land known as Randjeslaagte, which today forms part of the Johannesburg Central Business District. Randjeslaagte was a triangular tract of land not used for farming, with Hillbrow situated at the northern apex of the triangle. The name Hillbrow derives from the suburb's position on the brow of the east–west ridge that runs across the Johannesburg Central Business District.

The land was originally owned in the form of claims by J. Nicholls, who subsequently sold them to the Transvaal Mortgage, Loan & Finance Company. Hillbrow was laid out for residential development between 1894 and 1895, with stands auctioned by Richard Currie. In 1897, Hillbrow was incorporated into Johannesburg's Sanitary Board.

Following World War II, property values increased, and much of Hillbrow was redeveloped into tower blocks.

=== Jewish community ===
Since the early 1920s, Hillbrow has been home to a Jewish community. Jewish residents and investors were responsible for constructing many of the neighbourhood's buildings. Several social and cultural meeting places also developed, including the Florian Café on Kotze Street, which later became known as a gathering place for left-wing activists. Jewish anti-apartheid activist Rusty Bernstein described developing his political awareness there through discussions with Kurt Jonas, the son of German Jewish migrants and his fellow student at the University of the Witwatersrand’s School of Architecture.

Religious and communal institutions were established in Hillbrow. The Great Synagogue, formerly located on Wolmarans Street, was considered the central synagogue of Johannesburg and a major centre of Orthodox Judaism in South Africa. Temple Israel, designed by Herman Kallenbach, is the oldest Reform synagogue in the country and has been designated a heritage site. The former Poswohl Synagogue on Mooi Street, named after Pasvalys in Lithuania, served congregants who had emigrated from that town and was declared a National Monument in 1981.

In 1967, confrontations occurred in Hillbrow between German immigrants making Nazi salutes at a local beer hall and Jewish youth. The West German embassy in South Africa issued a statement condemning the salutes and attributing them to young people unfamiliar with life under Nazism.

During the 1960s and 1970s, many elderly Jewish residents purchased flats in Hillbrow.

Several Jewish architects contributed to the design of Hillbrow's buildings. Harold Le Roith introduced features such as pavement gardens at Golden Oaks, completed in 1976, and also designed Cresthill Mansions, later converted into social housing. In the 1970s, Isaac and Gloria Rootshtain purchased the Cranbrook Hotel on Leyds Street, a residential hotel originally designed by Le Roith that had been featured in The Architectural Review in 1953. They reopened it as a kosher establishment named The Connoisseur. Gloria Rootshtain later authored Cooking with a Connoisseur (1982), described as South Africa's first celebrity cookbook.

=== Gay community ===
In the mid-20th century, Hillbrow developed a reputation as a center for a white gay community. Beginning in the 1960s, several gay-oriented establishments and publications were established in the area.

=== Racial integration and white flight ===
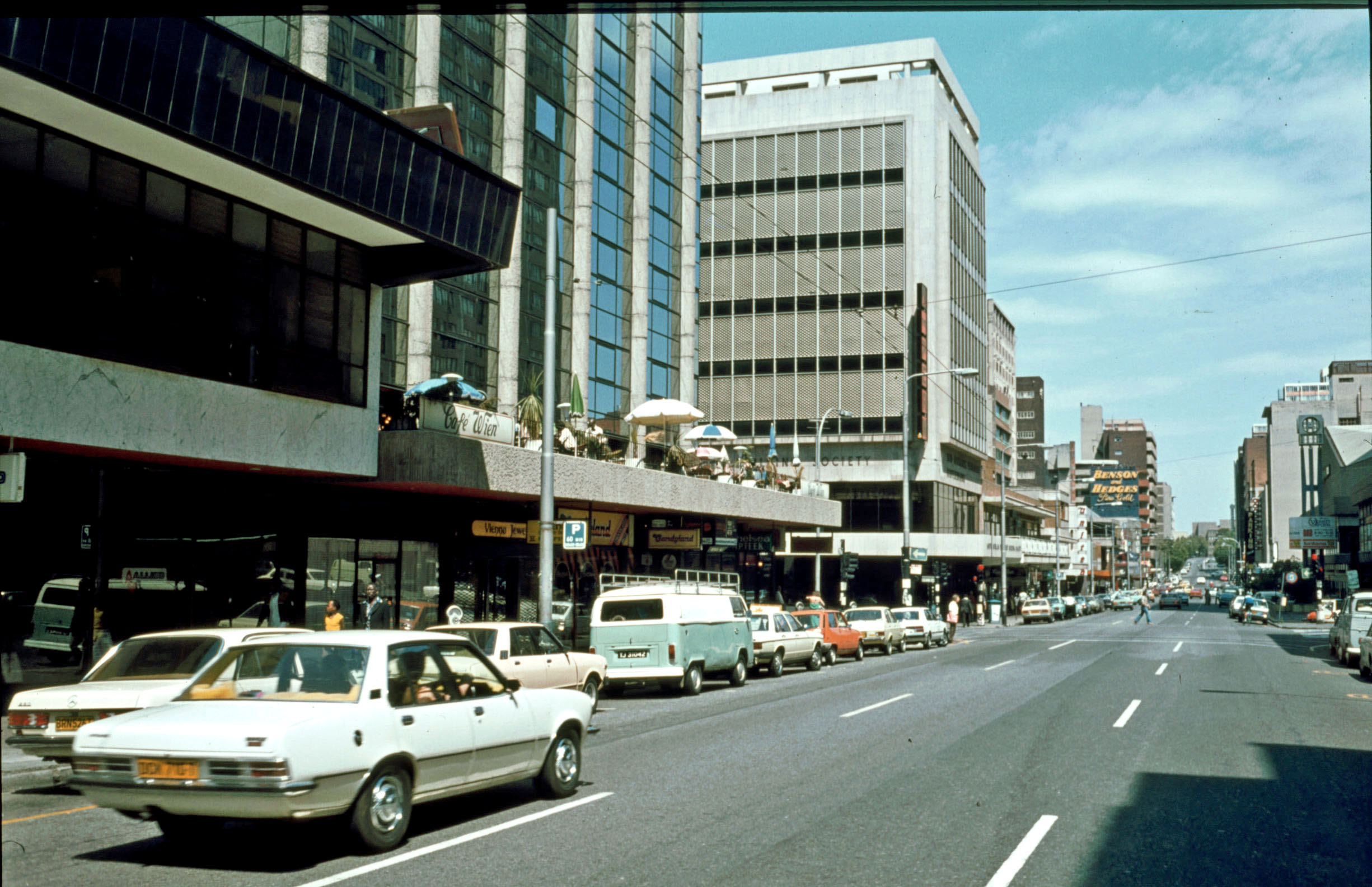
Cafe Wien, Hillbrow, Johannesburg (1980)

From the mid-1970s onward, Jews began moving from Hillbrow and other inner-city suburbs to the northern suburbs of Johannesburg. In 1978, the South African branch of the National Front distributed racist and antisemitic pamphlets in Hillbrow critical of Jewish landlords who rented properties to non-white tenants.

In the 1987 elections, the far-right National Party fielded Leon de Beer as a candidate in Hillbrow. His campaign was promoted in the Hillbrow-based gay publication Exit and combined support for gay rights with a proposal to resegregate Hillbrow as a whites-only district. De Beer won the election, becoming the first elected official in South Africa to run and be elected on a platform that included support for gay rights.

In 1989, Isaac and Gloria Rootshtain emigrated to Israel, selling The Connoisseur hotel in the same year.

In 1990, one of South Africa's first training and information centres for HIV was established in Hillbrow, serving primarily white gay men at its inception. In the 1990s, much of the white community—including the largely white gay community—left Hillbrow as part of white flight. By the late 1990s, the clinics in Hillbrow were primarily serving Black heterosexual women.

As of 2018, a small number of poor and elderly Jews remained in Hillbrow and the neighboring suburb of Berea, receiving support primarily from Jewish charities in Johannesburg.

=== Social action ===
Several social action groups and organizations have been active in Hillbrow to address local social challenges. In 1990, Jean du Plessis and Adele du Plessis founded The House Group, which established shelters and programs focused on the care and rehabilitation of female child victims of commercial sexual exploitation. The organization's first premises were located at 52 Soper Road, near Ponte City, before relocating in 1993 to two adjacent buildings at 60 Olivia Road, at the base of the Hillbrow Tower. These facilities included The House Drop-in Centre and the Intombi Shelter. The House Group was among the first organizations to advocate for legislation granting girls in shelters the same legal protections as boys. In 1997, the Gauteng Provincial Government enacted the first legislation enabling shelters to accommodate girls.

== Landmarks ==
=== Constitution Hill ===
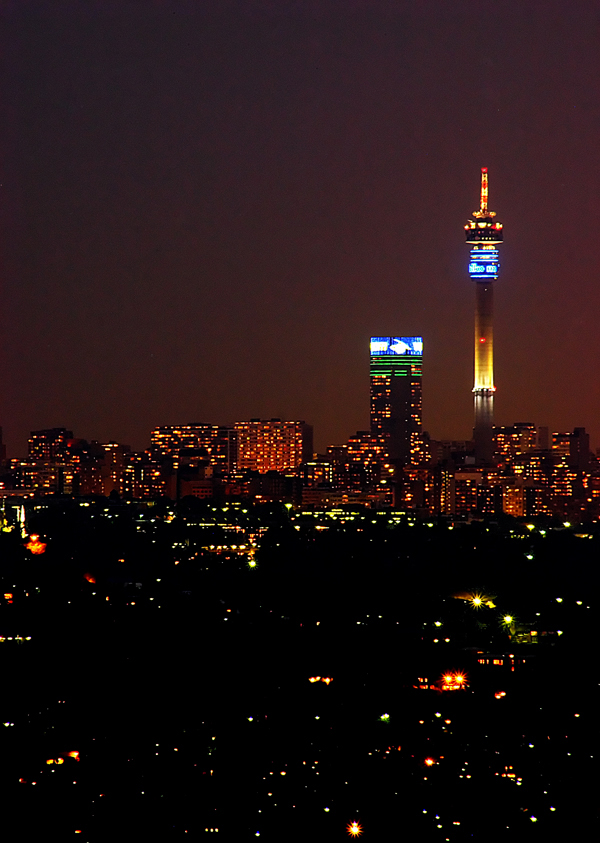
Hillbrow Tower (right) with Ponte Apartment building and the skyline of Hillbrow.

The Constitution Hill precinct, which houses the Constitutional Court of South Africa, is situated on the western edge of Hillbrow. It forms part of a broader government and private sector initiative to revitalize the area and the central business district.

=== Hillbrow Tower ===
The Hillbrow Tower, a telecommunications structure, is a prominent feature of the Johannesburg skyline and has appeared in numerous depictions of the city, including the city seal. Completed in 1971, the tower stands 270 metres tall, making it the tallest building with a lift in Africa. Originally named the JG Strijdom Tower, it became widely known as the Hillbrow Tower and was officially renamed the Telkom Joburg Tower in May 2005, with the new name displayed in lights. The tower previously housed a luxury rotating restaurant, which closed in 1981 due to security concerns.

=== Ponte City ===
Ponte City is the tallest residential building in Johannesburg and is regarded as a notable urban landmark. Designed by architect Rodney Grosskopff, who also designed the Johannesburg Civic Theatre, it was completed in 1975. The building rises 54 storeys above one of the highest points in the city and is distinguished by its cylindrical form. Once considered a desirable address, Ponte City experienced deterioration in living conditions during a period of disinvestment. In 1999 the building came under new management, with maintenance and gradual restoration undertaken alongside broader municipal and provincial initiatives to rehabilitate Hillbrow. In 2007, British director Danny Boyle announced plans to use Ponte City as a film location.

== In popular culture ==
=== Literature ===
- Something Out There, a 1984 novella by Nadine Gordimer briefly features foreign tourists, a married couple, that are mugged outside the Moulin Rouge Hotel in Hillbrow.
- Zoo City, a 2010 science fiction novel by Lauren Beukes is largely set in Hillbrow.
- The Restless Supermarket, a 2001 novel by Ivan Vladislavić, portraying South Africa's transition to democracy through the lens of Aubrey Tearle, a conservative white pensioner. Through this lens, Hillbrow becomes representative of the larger post-apartheid South Africa.
- Welcome to Our Hillbrow, a 2001 novel by Phaswane Mpe deals with life in the district in the years after apartheid, focusing on a large number of issues ranging from poverty, HIV/AIDS, and xenophobia.
- Room 207, a 2006 novel by Kgebetli Moele about six young black men living in Hillbrow

=== Music ===
- Hillbrow by Johannes Kerkorrel, from the album Eet Kreef (Shifty Records, 1989).
- Hillbrow by Stef Bos, from the album Jy vir My.
- Hillbrow by Manfred Mann's Earth Band, from the CD box Odds & Sods – Mis-takes & Out-takes

=== Film ===
- Gangster's Paradise: Jerusalema, a 2008 crime film set in Hillbrow

=== Documentary ===
In 2000, directors Michael Hammon and Jacqueline Görgen released the documentary Hillbrow Kids, which followed the lives of street children in post-apartheid Johannesburg. In 2007, BBC Two broadcast Law and Disorder in Johannesburg, presented by Louis Theroux, which examined crime and social conditions in the city, with a focus on Hillbrow. In 2013, Al Jazeera English aired a Witness documentary on Hillbrow, portraying the suburb as a densely populated urban area characterized by both crime and resilience.

=== Photography ===
Hillbrow has been the subject of several works by photographer David Goldblatt. His 1973 photographs Hillbrow, Johannesburg, South Africa and Domestic Worker on Abel Road, Hillbrow, Johannesburg are held in the collection of the Museum of Modern Art in New York City. The photograph Sunday Morning: A not-White family living illegally in the "White" group area of Hillbrow, Johannesburg depicts a Black family residing in the suburb in violation of the Group Areas Act and is part of the Yale University Art Gallery collection.

In 2010, several of Goldblatt's Hillbrow photographs were included in the exhibition South African Photographs: David Goldblatt at the Jewish Museum in New York. These works included Holdup in Hillbrow, Johannesburg, November 1963 and Baby with childminders and dogs in the Alexandra Street Park, Hillbrow, Johannesburg, 1972. The exhibition pieces were loaned from the Goodman Gallery in Johannesburg. Other Hillbrow works by Goldblatt include The Watchman, Balnagask Court, Hillbrow (1972), Woman Shopping, Hillbrow (1972), and Man with an Injured Arm, Hillbrow (1972).

== Notable people ==
- Norman Gordon (1911–2014), cricketer
- Bonaventure Hinwood (1930–2016), Roman Catholic priest and Afrikaans poet
- Sid James (1913–1976), Actor
- Sol Phenduka (1987–present), radio presenter at Kaya FM
- Helen Zille (1951–present), former Federal Leader of the Democratic Alliance

== Bibliography ==
- Daniel Conway (2009), "Queering Apartheid: the National Party's 1987 'Gay Rights' Election Campaign in Hillbrow", Journal of Southern African Studies, 35,4: 849–863.
- Glynn Griffiths and Paddy Clay, Hillbrow (Cape Town: Don Nelson, 1982)
- Alan Morris, Bleakness and Light: Inner City Transition in Hillbrow, Johannesburg (Johannesburg: University of Witwatersrand Press, 1999)
- Ron Nerio and Jean Halley, The Roads to Hillbrow: Making Life in South Africa's Community of Migrants (Fordham University Press, 2022)
