= Rautenbach =

Rautenbach is a surname. Notable people with the surname include:

- Billy Rautenbach (born 1959), Zimbabwean businessman
- Conrad Rautenbach (born 1984), Zimbabwean rally driver
- Faan Rautenbach (born 1976), South African rugby union player
- Jans Rautenbach (1936–2016), South African screenwriter, film producer, and director
