= 120 End Street =

Building in Africa

Coordinates: 26.1977°S 28.053°E

120 End Street is a skyscraper in Hillbrow, Johannesburg, South Africa. It is 28 storeys tall. The three wings of the building are set at 120 degrees from each other so that each apartment in the building has a clear view.
