= Die Kandidaat =

- Directed by: Jans Rautenbach
- Written by: Emil Nofal
- Cinematography: Vincent G. Cox
- Release dates: January 1, 1968
- Running time: 105 min
- Country: South Africa
- Language: Afrikaans

Die Kandidaat is a 1968 Afrikaans-language South African drama film directed by Jans Rautenbach and starring Gert Van den Bergh, Marie Du Toit and Regardt van den Bergh. The film was regarded as critical of the apartheid system, and it faced some censorship from the authorities.

== Cast ==
- Bernadette Da Silva - Jackie Smith
- Hermien Dommisse - Anna Volschenk
- Marie Du Toit - Paula Neethling
- Roelf Jacobs - Jan Le Roux
- Don Leonard - Krisjan
- Jacques Loots - Reverend Peroldt
- Cobus Rossouw - Anton Du Toit
- Gert Van den Bergh - Lourens Niemandt
- Regardt van den Bergh - Kallie

== Bibliography ==
- Tomaselli, Keyan. The cinema of apartheid: race and class in South African film. Routledge, 1989.
