= Mike Holt =

South African boxer (1931–2008)

Personal information
- Nationality: South African
- Born: Antione Michael Holthausen; 15 September 1931 Pretoria, South Africa
- Died: 19 July 2008 (aged 76)
- Height: 5 ft 10 1/2 in (1.79 m)
- Weight: middle/light heavy/heavyweight

Boxing career
- Reach: 70 in (178 cm)
- Stance: Orthodox

Boxing record
- Total fights: 77
- Wins: 54 (KO 34)
- Losses: 9 (KO 3)
- Draws: 4

Mike Holt (15 September 1931 – 19 July 2008), born Antione Michael Holthausen, was a South African professional middle/light heavy/heavyweight boxer of the 1950s and '60s who won the South African middleweight title, and South African light heavyweight title, and drew with Johnny Halafihi for the vacant British Commonwealth light heavyweight title. Holt won the South African middleweight title from Eddie Thomas, and successfully defended the title against Thomas (twice), Cocky Bredenkamp, Jimmie Elliott, and Stoffel du Plessis. Holt was a challenger for the British Empire middleweight title against Pat McAteer, and British Empire light heavyweight title against Yvon Durelle, his professional fighting weight varied from 151 1/2 lb (68.7 kg; 10 st 11.5 lb), i.e. middleweight to 185 lb (84 kg; 13 st 3 lb), i.e. heavyweight, he was managed by Piet Lourens.

== Outside of boxing ==
Mike Holt appeared as 'Punchy' in Kimberley Jim, the 1965 South African musical comedy film directed by Emil Nofal and starring Jim Reeves.
