= Riku Lätti =

South African musician

Riku Lätti is a South African singer, songwriter, and writer.

== Biography ==
After graduating in 1991 from Hoërskool Florida, Johannesburg, he completed a philosophy honors degree at the University of the Witwatersrand. He changed his name to Victor S. Wolf and claimed that Riku Lattii was "dead." Since then he has composed the complete film score for Jans Rautenbach's film Abraham (2015), on which he was credited as Riku Lätti.

In South Africa, Lätti collaborated with Koos Kombuis, Laurika Rauch, David Kramer, and Stef Bos, among others. His songs have been performed and recorded by Laurika Rauch, Bobby van Jaarsveld, and Izak Davel.

In 2005, he had his international break, completing his first tour of Belgium and the Netherlands. In 2006, during a follow-up tour through Europe, he performed with Stef Bos. On 1 October 2007, Lätti released his first album in the Benelux (Akoesties). For this album, he re-recorded some of his songs in stripped-down versions, using only his voice and a piano or a guitar.

Together with Jahn Beukes, Lätti wrote the music for the SABC television series Hopeville. His other scores include the soundtrack for the KykNet series Wie lê waar and the drama series Vlug na Egipte.

== Discography ==
- Me and Mr. Sane
- Pleister vir my nerwe (won the GMT Award for Best Alternative Afrikaans album}
- WOKNAKWYF!
- Jean Marais - Nou
- Aan't sterre tel (2004) (won the GMT Award for best male vocalist)
- Radio Lava (2007)
- Akoesties (2009) (released in Benelux only)
- Die Ongelooflike avonture van Hanna Hoekom' (2010)
- Janneman in die Diereryk (2011) (album for children)
- Die Wasgoedlyn Volume 01 (2015)
- Die klankbaan van Jans Rautenbach film - Abraham (2015)
- Hoop daai boom is Oukei (2018)
