= Rocherpan Marine Protected Area =

Marine conservation area on the west coast of the Western Cape in South Africa

- Rocherpan MPA location
- Location: St Helena Bay, South Africa
- Nearest city: Velddrif
- Coordinates: 32°36.89′S 18°18.11′E
- Area: 1.5 km^{2} (0.58 sq mi)
- Established: 1988
- Governing body: Cape Nature
- Website: www.capenature.co.za/reserves/rocherpan-nature-reserve
- Rocherpan Marine Protected Area (South Africa)

The Rocherpan Marine Protected Area is a small coastal conservation region on the West Coast of the Western Cape province, in the territorial waters of South Africa. It is about 25 km north of Velddrif on the road to Elands Bay, north of Dwarskersbos.

== History ==
The MPA is part of the Rocherpan Nature Reserve Complex (RNRC) which was proclaimed in 1988 under the Sea Fisheries Act. It was not mentioned in the Marine Living Resources Act, or listed with other MPAs in the Department of Agriculture, Forestry and Fisheries Marine Recreational Activity Brochure of 2017/2018, but is assumed to be registered as an MPA under Sub-section 82(4) of the MLRA and therefore transferred by presidential pronouncement to Section 22A of National Environmental Management: Protected Areas Act, 57 of 2003 in 2014.

== Purpose ==
A marine protected area is defined by the IUCN as "A clearly defined geographical space, recognised, dedicated and managed, through legal or other effective means, to achieve the long-term conservation of nature with associated ecosystem services and cultural values".

The MPA is part of the Rocherpan Nature Reserve, which is an important wetland site for water birds. It is a major pan on the West Coast that provides protection to marine, freshwater and terrestrial habitats. The Nature Reserve protects the critically endangered aquatic plant Zannichellia aschersoniana and exposed west coast sandy beach and nearshore sandy habitat.

== Extent ==
The MPA is on the coast north of Saldanha Bay on the Western Cape coast. 3 km of shoreline and 1.5 km^{2} of coastal ocean extending 500 m to seaward is protected.

=== Zonation ===
The whole MPA is a controlled zone, and the only resource use permitted is shore angling.

== Management ==
The marine protected areas of South Africa are the responsibility of the national government, which has management agreements with a variety of MPA management authorities, in this case, Cape Nature, which manages the MPA with funding from the SA Government through the Department of Environment, Forestry and Fisheries. There is an established Protected Area Advisory Committee for the Rocherpan Nature Reserve Complex.

The nature reserve complex has an approved management plan dated 2014 to 2019 but it is not known if it has been approved by the minister of the Executive Council. There is no management plan specific to the MPA. The objectives of the nature reserve are to conserve and maintain marine, coastal, wetland and terrestrial habitats, encourage sustainable access, and provide overnight accommodation for a limited number of visitors.

The Department of Environment, Forestry and Fisheries is responsible for issuing permits, quotas and law enforcement.

== Use ==
Surf angling is allowed under permit, and with size and bag limits. There are opportunities for increased tourism, and involvement of local communities in management, which could create more local employment.

== Geography ==
=== Climate ===
The climate of the South-western Cape is markedly different from the rest of South Africa, which is a summer rainfall region, receiving most of its rainfall during the summer months of December to February. The South-western Cape has a Mediterranean type climate, with most of its rainfall during the winter months from June to September.

During the summer the dominant factor determining the weather in the region is a high pressure zone, known as the Atlantic High, located over the South Atlantic ocean to the west of the Cape coast. Winds circulating in an anticlockwise direction from such a system reach the Cape from the south-east, producing periods of up to several days of high winds and mostly clear skies. These winds keep the region relatively cool.

Winter in the South-western Cape is characterised by disturbances in the circumpolar westerly winds, resulting in a series of eastward moving depressions. These bring cool cloudy weather and rain from the north west. The south westerly winds over the South Atlantic produce the prevailing south-westerly swell typical of the winter months, which beat on the exposed coastline.

== Ecology ==
Marine ecoregions of the South African Exclusive Economic Zone: Rocherpan Marine Protected Area is in the Benguela ecoregion

(describe position, biodiversity and endemism of the region)

The MPA is in the cool temperate Benguela inshore marine ecoregion to the west of Cape Point which extends northwards to Namibia. There are some species endemic to South Africa along this coastline.

Two major habitats exist in the sea in this region, distinguished by the nature of the substrate. The substrate, or base material, is important in that it provides a base to which an organism can anchor itself, which is vitally important for those organisms which need to stay in one particular kind of place. Rocky shores and reefs provide a firm fixed substrate for the attachment of plants and animals. Some of these may have Kelp forests, which reduce the effect of waves and provide food and shelter for an extended range of organisms.

Sandy beaches and bottoms are a relatively unstable substrate and cannot anchor kelp or many of the other benthic organisms. Finally there is open water, above the substrate and clear of the kelp forest, where the organisms must drift or swim. Mixed habitats are also frequently found, which are a combination of those mentioned above.

Sandy beaches and bottoms (including shelly, pebble and gravel bottoms)

Sandy bottoms at first glance appear to be fairly barren areas, as they lack the stability to support many of the spectacular reef based species, and the variety of large organisms is relatively low. The sand is continually being moved around by wave action, to a greater or lesser degree depending on weather conditions and exposure of the area. This means that sessile organisms must be specifically adapted to areas of relatively loose substrate to thrive in them, and the variety of species found on a sandy or gravel bottom will depend on all these factors. Sandy bottoms have one important compensation for their instability, animals can burrow into the sand and move up and down within its layers, which can provide feeding opportunities and protection from predation. Other species can dig themselves holes in which to shelter, or may feed by filtering water drawn through the tunnel, or by extending body parts adapted to this function into the water above the sand.

The open sea

The pelagic water column is the major part of the living space at sea. This is the water between the surface and the top of the benthic zone, where living organisms swim, float or drift, and the food chain starts with phytoplankton, the mostly microscopic photosynthetic organisms that convert the energy of sunlight into organic material which feeds nearly everything else, directly or indirectly. In temperate seas there are distinct seasonal cycles of phytoplankton growth, based on the available nutrients and the available sunlight. Either can be a limiting factor. Phytoplankton tend to thrive where there is plenty of light, and they themselves are a major factor in restricting light penetration to greater depths, so the photosynthetic zone tends to be shallower in areas of high productivity. Zooplankton feed on the phytoplankton, and are in turn eaten by larger animals. The larger pelagic animals are generally faster moving and more mobile, giving them the option of changing depth to feed or to avoid predation, and to move to other places in search of a better food supply.

=== Marine species diversity ===
Galjoen, Silver kob, and Lesser guitarfish.

==== Endemism ====
The MPA is in the cool temperate Benguela ecoregion to the west of Cape Point which extends northwards to Namibia. There are a moderate proportion of species endemic to South Africa along this coastline.

== Threats ==
The reserve and MPA are close to towns and subject to uncontrolled access with associated vandalism, illegal fishing and hunting There is uncontrolled access by driving on the beach. The reserve has no marine law enforcement capability, and water use from the Papkuils River which supplies the wetland is not controlled.

== See also ==
Marine protected areas of South Africa
- List of protected areas of South Africa
- Marine protected areas of South Africa – Protected areas of coastline or ocean in the EEZ of South Africa
