= Don Leonard (actor) =

South African actor (1925–2002)

- Born: Wilson Sawyer Arthur; 1925; Winburg, Orange Free State, South Africa
- Died: 2002 (aged 76–77)
- Occupation: Actor
- Spouse: Jean Leonard

Don Leonard (1925–2002) was a South African film actor.

== Career ==
He appeared in ten films between 1965 and 1979.

== Filmography ==
Filmography
Year	Title	Genre	Role	Notes
1965	Kimberley Jim	musical comedy	Rube	
1965	King Hendrik	Comedy	Customs officer	
1967	Wild Season	drama	Jerry	
1968	Die Kandidaat	drama	Krisjan	
1969	Danie Bosman: Die verhaal van die grootste S.A. komponis	Biography / Drama / Music	Bossie	
1969	Katrina	romance-drama	Kimberley	
1970	Jannie Totsiens	mystery-horror romance		
1970	Scotty & Co.	Western	Court interpreter	
1971	Creatures the World Forgot	science-fiction adventure horror	The Old Leader	
1971	Die Banneling	action	Rooie	
1971	Erfgenaam	Drama	Faan Landman	
1971	Sononder	Drama	Kobus du Plooy	
1972	Die Lewe Sonder Jou	Drama	Koos Pretorius	
1972	Vlug van die Seemeeu	Drama	Skinny (Gert van Eeden)	
1973	Die Sersant en die Tiger Moth	Comedy / Drama	Sgt. Herklaas van der Poel	
1973	Môre, Môre	Drama	Vercueil	
1974	Die Afspraak	Thriller	van Tonder	
1974	Pens en Pootjies	Comedy	Pens van Helsdingen	
1975	Dingetjie Is Dynamite! (My Naam Is Nog Steeds Dingetjie)	Action / Comedy / Western	Daan van der Merwe	
1975	Kniediep	Comedy	Spek Poggenpoel	
1975	Wat Maak Oom Kalie Daar?	Comedy	Oom Kalie du Preez	
1976	Erfgoed is Sterfgoed	Comedy	Racegoer	
1976	'n Beeld vir Jeannie	Drama	Flippie Moolman	
1977	Kom Tot Rus	Comedy	Oom Barkhuizen	
1977	My Way II	Family		
1978	'n Seder Val in Waterkloof	Comedy/Drama	Van	
1978	Someone Like You "Iemand Soos Jy"	drama	Oom Faan	
1978	Witblits & Peach Brandy	Comedy	Koos van Graan	
1979	Scotty & Co.	western		
1979	Zulu Dawn	war	Fannin	
