= Rocherpan Nature Reserve =

Nature reserve in Western Cape, South Africa

- Location: Western Cape; South Africa
- Coordinates: 32°36′53″S 18°18′7″E
- Area: 1,800 ha (4,400 acres; 18 km^{2}; 6.9 sq mi)
- Established: December 10, 1976; 49 years ago
- Governing body: CapeNature
- Website: CapeNature - Rocherpan Nature Reserve
- Rocherpan Nature Reserve (South Africa)

Rocherpan Nature Reserve is a nature reserve on the West Coast of Western Cape, South Africa. It borders the sea, about 25 km (16 mi) north of Velddrif on the road between Velddrif and Laaiplek to Elands Bay, and is north of Dwarskersbos. The reserve occupies an area of 1,080 ha (2,700 acres; 10.8 km^{2}; 4.2 sq mi).

== History ==
In 1839, Pierre Rocher dredged the mouth of the Papkuils River and used water drawn from the Auroraberg Mountains to make better pasture for his cattle behind the dunes. In the process, he unwittingly established ideal bird habitat.

The lake was declared a nature reserve in 1966. Since 1988, the area 500 m (1,600 ft) from the coast has been a marine reserve, the Rocherpan Marine Protected Area.

== Ecology ==
During the Cape rainy season, the lagoon fills an area of 110 ha (270 acres) and is around 6 km (3.7 mi) long and up to 2 m (6 ft 7 in) deep. From March to June, however, the lake is dry. 183 species of birds (including 70 of waterfowl) can be found here, including, among others, the great white pelican (Pelecanus onocrotalus), the African oystercatcher (Haematopus moquini), and the greater flamingo. There is also a hatching ground for the Cape shoveler (Anas smithii). From June to September, whales frequent the coast. In the spring, the veld often features the Namaqualand bloom.

== Activities ==
In the park there are two hiking trails; the 9 km (5.6 mi) Rocherpan Trail and the 7 km (4.3 mi) Beach Trail. There are three bird hides on the Rocherpan, and an untouched beach.
