= Abraham (2015 film) =

2015 South African drama film directed by Jans Rautenbach

- Directed by: Jans Rautenbach
- Written by: Jans Rautenbach
- Production company: Spookasem Films
- Release date: 16 October 2015 (South Africa)
- Running time: 95 minutes
- Country: South Africa
- Language: Afrikaans

Abraham is a 2015 Afrikaans-language South African drama film written and directed by Jans Rautenbach. It was Rautenbach's last film before his death. Abraham was released on 16 October 2015 in South Africa.

== Premise ==
A gifted sculptor living in poverty in a 1980s rural Kannaland tries to exploit his profession to earn enough money to feed his family.

== Cast ==
- D.J. Mouton as Abraham
- Hannes Muller as Jans
- Franci Swanepoel as Almeri
- Chantell Phillipus as Katie
- Jill Levenberg as Beulah
- Frans Lucas as Dirk

== Music Score ==
The entire music score of Abraham was composed by Riku Lätti and recorded on location at Vlakteplaas near De Rust with all the songs used in the film sung by actors from the film. The instrumentation and music styles also reflects the instruments and the music styles as played by the musicians from that area to create an sonic landscape authentic to the visual landscape seen in the film. The Abraham Soundtrack was made available to the public by Die Wasgoedlyn

== Reception ==
The film received critical praise.

Daniel Dercksen, writing for The Writing Studio, praised the film, saying: "Abraham is a profound and consummate masterwork."

== See also ==
- List of South African films
