= My Way (1972 film) =

- Directed by: Emil Nofal; Roy Sargeant
- Written by: Emil Nofal
- Produced by: Emil Nofal
- Starring: Joe Stewardson; Richard Loring; Marie Du Toit; Tony Jay
- Cinematography: Vincent G. Cox
- Edited by: David De Beyer; Peter Henkel
- Music by: Robin Netcher
- Release date: March 27, 1972
- Country: South Africa
- Language: English

My Way (also known as The Winners) is a 1972 South African drama film directed by Emil Nofal and Roy Sargeant and starring Joe Stewardson, Richard Loring, Marie Du Toit and Tony Jay. It was followed by a sequel My Way II in 1977.

== Cast ==
- Joe Stewardson - Will Maddox
- Richard Loring - Paul Maddox
- Marie Du Toit - Fran Maddox
- Tony Jay - Natie Kaplan
- Madeleine Usher - Gillian Scott
- John Higgins - Barry Maddox
- Ken Leach - Tony Maddox
- Diane Ridler - Gina
- Jenny Meyer - Sandra Maddox
- Ian Yule - Andy
- Gregorio Fiasconaro - Mario
- Marcello Fiasconaro - Dave McAllister
- Clive Scott - Reporter
- Barbara Kinghorn - Daisy
- John Hayter - Doctor
- Norman Coombes - Chairman

== Bibliography ==
- Tomaselli, Keyan. The cinema of apartheid: race and class in South African film. Routledge, 1989.
