= Kimberley Jim =

1963 film by Emil Nofal

Kimberly Jim
- Directed by: Emil Nofal
- Written by: Emil Nofal
- Starring: Jim Reeves; Madeleine Usher; Clive Parnell
- Release date: 26 September 1963
- Running time: 83 minutes

Kimberley Jim is a 1963 South African musical comedy film directed by Emil Nofal and starring American singer Jim Reeves.

== Plot ==
American singer Jim Madison takes part in the Kimberley diamond rush in South Africa in the late 19th century. Two likeable con-men, played by Jim Reeves and Clive Parnell, earn their living by selling patent medicine and cheating at poker. The two invest their winnings into developing a diamond mine but must outsmart the crooked local businessman.

== Production ==
Most exteriors were filmed in the area of the small town of Brits while interiors were shot at the Jamie Uys studios in the Northcliff suburb of Johannesburg. Reeves later said that he enjoyed the film-making experience and would consider devoting more of his career to this medium. The film was released in September 1965, fourteen months after Reeves's death in an airplane crash.

== Music ==
Reeves, a country singer, enjoyed international popularity during the 1960s. According to Billboard magazine, "Reeves’ star shone equally bright overseas in England, India, Germany, and even South Africa". Reeves contributes to the soundtrack and even sings part of one song in Afrikaans. The soundtrack of 14 songs included the songs "Kimberley Jim," "Strike It Rich," "I Grew Up," "My Life Is A Gypsy," "Born To Be Lucky," "Old Fashioned Rag," "Diamonds In The Sand," "A Stranger's Just A Friend," " Fall In And Follow," "Roving Gambler" and "Dolly With The Dimpled Knees."

== Cast ==
- Jim Reeves - Jim Madison
- Madeleine Usher - Julie Patterson
- Clive Parnell - Gerry Bates
- Arthur Swemmer - Bert Patterson
- Vonk de Ridder - Danny Pretorius
- Tromp Terréblanche - Ben Vorster
- Mike Holt - Punchy
- Dawid van der Walt - Jan le Roux
- Ruth Neethling - Elize
- George Moore - Fred Parker
- Freddie Prozesky - Neels le Roux
- Don Leonard - Rube
- Morris Blake - Max Bloom
