= Hannah Botha =

South African actress (1923–2007)

- Born: 17 January 1923; Dwarskersbos, South Africa
- Died: 16 April 2007 (aged 84); Johannesburg, South Africa
- Occupation: Actress

Hannah Botha (17 January 1923 – 16 April 2007) was a South African actress known for roles in Nommer Asseblief, Agter Elke Man and most recently the soap-opera Egoli: Place of Gold. She matriculated at Hoërskool Piketberg. She did not become a full-time actress until 1988, before then she worked at the Legal Department of the Receiver of Revenue. She died on 16 April 2007, aged 84, of possible heart failure, in Johannesburg, and her last episode on Egoli was dedicated to her.
