= Stoffel du Plessis =

South African boxer

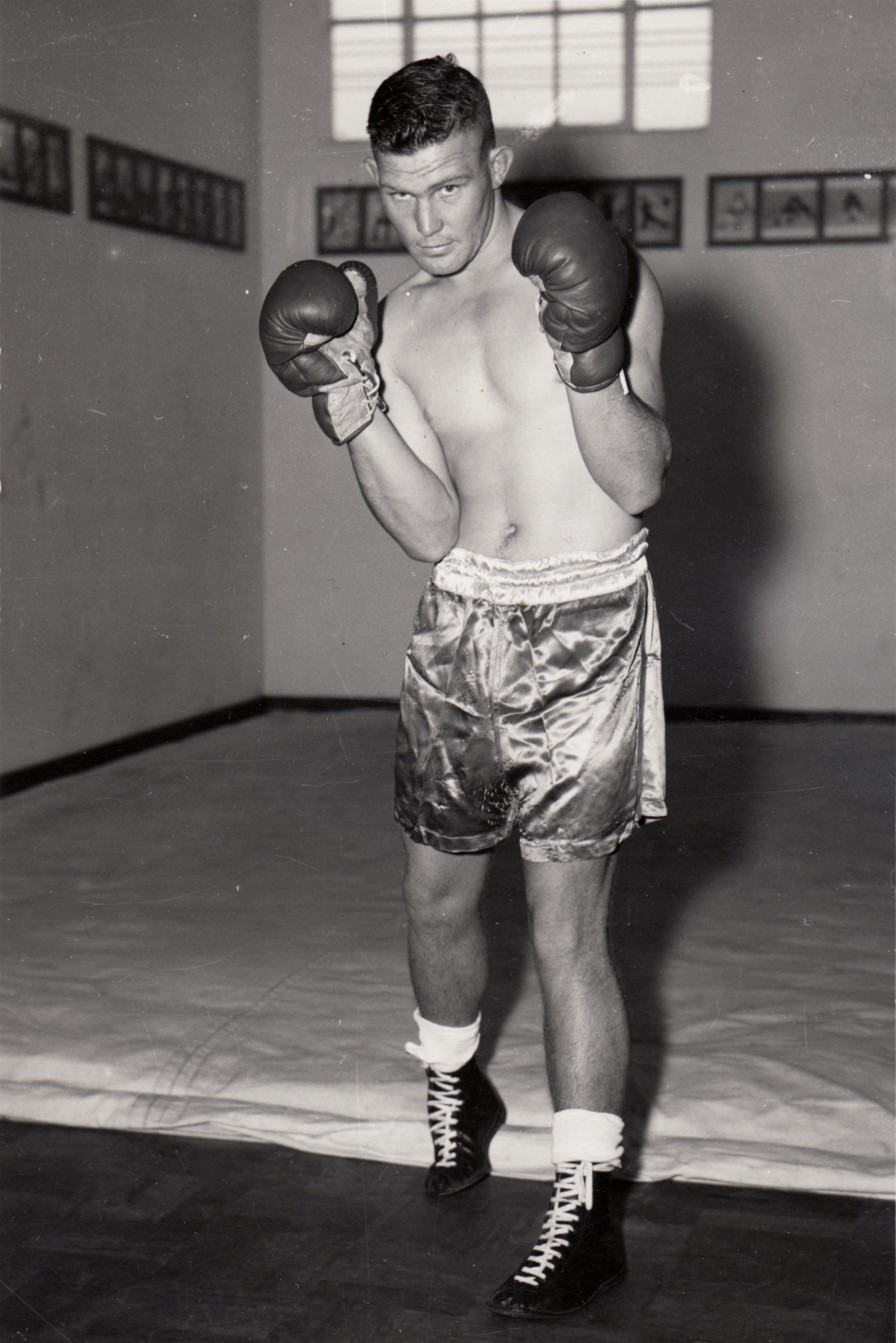

Personal information
- Nationality: South African
- Born: Christoffel Petrus du Plessis; 27 December 1932 Lichtenburg, South Africa
- Died: 8 March 2000 (aged 67) Klerksdorp, South Africa
- Height: 5 ft 6.5 in (1.69 m)
- Weight: Middleweight

Boxing career
- Stance: Orthodox

Boxing record
- Total fights: 19
- Wins: 11 (KO 4)
- Losses: 6
- Draws: 2

Stoffel du Plessis (27 December 1932 – 8 March 2000) born Christoffel Petrus du Plessis, in the district of Lichtenburg, was a South African amateur and professional middleweight boxer of the 1950s.

== Early life ==
Du Plessis was born in the district of Lichtenburg, Transvaal, where his father, a Boer farmer originally from the Wolmaransstad district, earned a living as diamond digger at Elandsputte. After completing school, Du Plessis completed his apprenticeship in Johannesburg to become a bricklayer. Stoffel had a younger brother, Botha du Plessis, a 1956 Olympic boxer.

== Amateur career ==
Du Plessis' amateur record dates from 1948, when he fought for two years as a junior at weights ranging from 114 and 135 pounds. His career as senior lasted from 1950 to 1952, competing at 140 pounds, 147 pounds, 156 pounds and finally at 165 pounds. During this time, he represented South Africa at the Commonwealth Games. On 17 April 1952, Du Plessis lost to Theuns van Schalkwyk on points during the final of the South African trials for the 1952 Olympic Games. Van Schalkwyk, who was the reigning Commonwealth champion, went on to win silver at the said Olympic Games. Du Plessis finished his amateur career on 27 September 1952, with a first-round knockout of A Nel in Bloemfontein, amassing a record of 30-19-3 (16 KO). As an amateur he was crowned both Transvaal and South African middleweight champion.

== Professional career ==
The Transvaal Board of Control for Professional Boxing and Wrestling granted Du Plessis his professional boxing license on 6 February 1953. After his first four bouts, and victories over Corrie van Niekerk and Alex Weiss, Du Plessis was ranked as Class A by the magazine Boxing Round-Up. After fighting 13 more times during the next three years, Du Plessis earned a title shot against reigning South African middleweight champion, Mike Holt.

=== Holt vs. Du Plessis ===
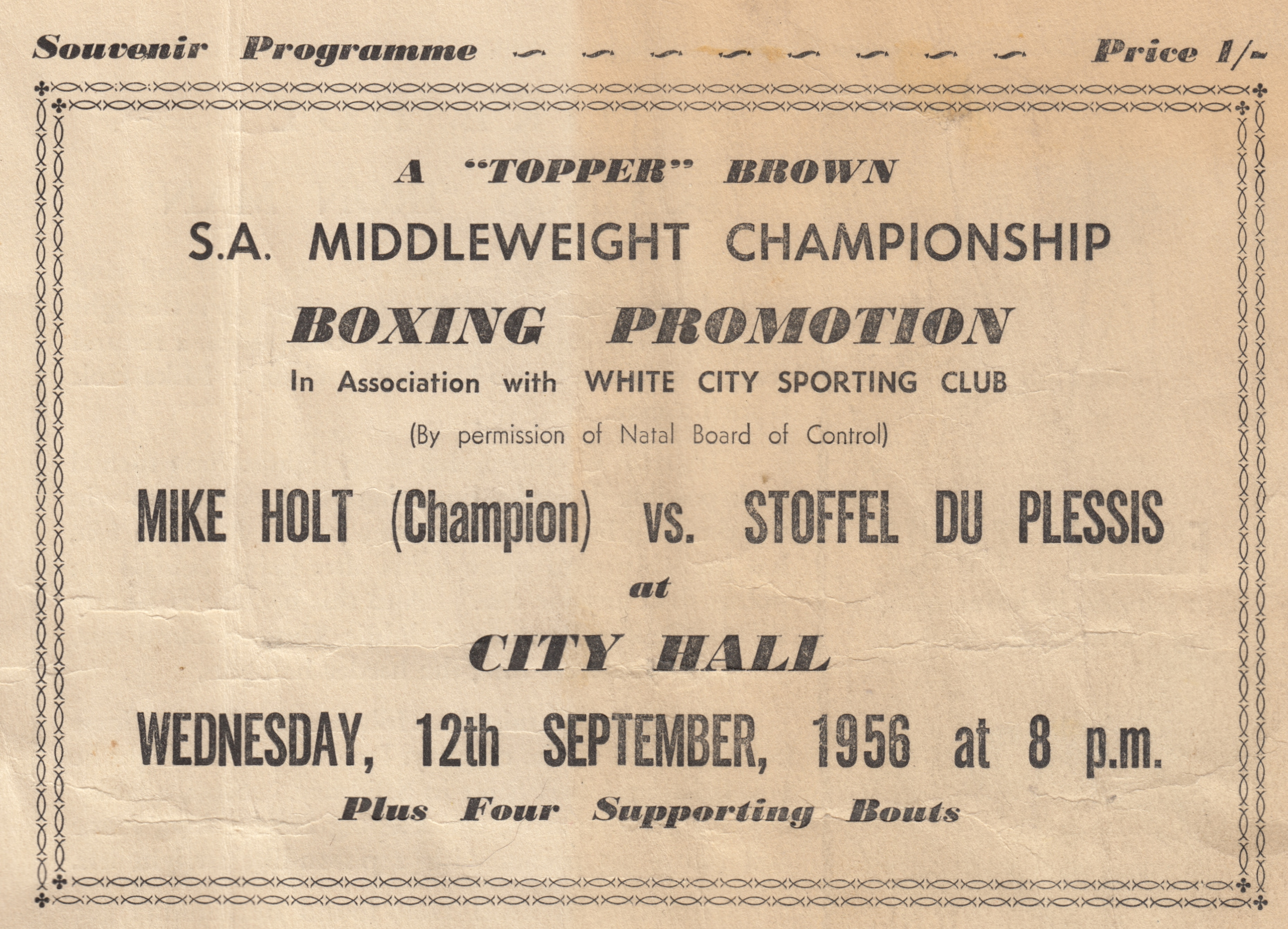
Front page of the souvenir programme for Stoffel du Plessis's middleweight title fight with Mike Holt.

Du Plessis fought Mike Holt for the South African Middleweight title in the Durban City Hall on 12 September 1956.

On fight night, Du Plessis weighed 5½ pounds less than Holt. By the second round, “Holt’s nose was a dull red blob on his face, thanks to Du Plessis’s left jabs, which found a way through Holt’s wide open stance.” A cut appeared next to Holt's left eye in the fourth round, though Du Plessis was in a far worse state at this time, bleeding from the nose and having a cut eye himself. After a “gory fifth round”, Holt pressured Du Plessis through the next two rounds, dropping him in the sixth. By the seventh round Du Plessis's cut was so bad that he could not continue the bout.

The pair were to fight again only 10 days later, on 22 September 1956 in Salisbury, Rhodesia. Holt dropped Du Plessis three times in the first round, winning by TKO in the second.

Stoffel du Plessis retired from professional boxing after this fight.

== Personal life ==
Du Plessis moved to Klerksdorp in the mid 1950s, an area from which the family hailed originally. He worked privately as a bricklayer, before becoming a mason at Hartbeestfontein gold mine to the east of the town. He worked there up to his retirement nearly thirty years later. For many years, Du Plessis was coach of the Klerksdorp amateur boxing club. Both his sons were to train there, earning Transvaal colours. His oldest son would become South African University Champion at welterweight in 1979, representing the University of Pretoria where he studied to become a veterinary surgeon. Later South African heavyweight champion, Kallie Knoetze, grew up in this gym as an amateur.

Du Plessis was a staunch supporter of the Herstigte Nasionale Party, especially under the leadership of Jaap Marais. In later life, Du Plessis raced pigeons as a hobby. He died on 8 March 2000 at his home in Klerksdorp, after a short battle with lymphoma.

== Professional boxing record ==
19 fights	11 wins	6 losses
By knockout	4	4
By decision	7	1
By disqualification	0	1
Draws	2	

No.	Result	Record	Opponent	Type	Round	Date	Location	Notes
18	Loss	11–5–2	(South Africa) Mike Holt	TKO	2 (?)	22 Sep 1955	Raylton Sports Club, Salisbury, Rhodesia	
18	Loss	11–5–2	(South Africa) Mike Holt	RTD	6 (12)	12 Sep 1955	City Hall, Durban, South Africa	South African middleweight title
17	Draw	11–4–2	(South Africa) Chris van Rooyen	D	4	21 Jul 1955	Olympia Ice Rink, Johannesburg, South Africa	
16	Win	11–4–1	(Italy) Vittorio Corso	PTS	6	19 Nov 1955	Olympia Ice Rink, Johannesburg, South Africa	
15	Win	10–4–1	(South Africa) Arthur Ketchell	PTS	6	19 Nov 1955	Davies Stadium, Port Elizabeth, South Africa	
14	Win	9–4–1	(South Africa) Warrance Burger	TKO	4 (?)	9 Apr 1955	City Hall, Johannesburg, South Africa	
13	Draw	8–4–1	(South Africa) Mannetjie Roux (“Kid Valentine”)	D	4	14 Mar 1955	Wembley Stadium, Johannesburg, South Africa	
12	Loss	8–4	(South Africa) Jimmy Elliot	DQ	6	13 Dec 1954	Raylton Sports Club, Salisbury, Rhodesia	
11	Win	8–3	(South Africa) Kenny Lawrence	PTS	4	30 Jun 1954	Olympia Ice Rink, Johannesburg, South Africa	
10	Win	7–3	(South Africa) Johnny Roberts	PTS	4	22 May 1954	City Hall, Johannesburg, South Africa	
9	Win	6–3	(South Africa) Chris van Rooyen	PTS	4	10 Apr 1954	Welkom, South Africa	
8	Loss	5–3	(South Africa) Albert Scott	TKO	6 (6)	26 Oct 1953	Selborne Hall, Johannesburg, South Africa	
7	Win	5–2	(South Africa) Johnny Bezuidenhout	TKO	4	29 Jan 1954	City Hall, Durban, South Africa	
6	Loss	4–2	(South Africa) Kenny Lawrence	PTS	4	26 Oct 1953	Feather Market Hall, Port Elizabeth, South Africa	
5	Win	4–1	(South Africa) Johnny Roberts	PTS	4	5 Aug 1953	Wembley Stadium, Johannesburg, South Africa	
4	Win	3–1	(South Africa) Alex Weiss	PTS	4	6 Jul 1953	Mike Friedman’s Gym, Johannesburg, South Africa	
3	Win	2–1	(South Africa) Corrie van Niekerk	PTS	4	27 Jul 1953	Feather Market Hall, Port Elizabeth, South Africa	
2	Win	1–1	(South Africa) Jan Scheepers	KO	3 (?)	13 Apr 1953	Mike Friedman’s Gym, Johannesburg, South Africa	
1	Loss	0–1	(South Africa) Chris van Rooyen	TKO	1 (6)	21 Feb 1953	Far North Rugby Stadium, Pietersburg, South Africa	Professional debut
