= List of Agter Elke Man episodes =

The following is a list of episodes for the television show Agter Elke Man.

== Series overview ==
Season	Episodes	Originally aired
1	30	1985 – 1986
2	36	1988

== Season 1: 1985-1986 ==
Season 1, consisting of 30 episodes, first premiered in South Africa on TV1 on September 5, 1985, and ended on March 27, 1986 .

No.	Original release date
1	September 5, 1985
Andries Barenhoren gets a promotion and asks Marietjie for a divorce. Steve ask Leana to marry him.
2	September 12, 1985
Leana approaches Anna Meyer, Albert Jooste's ex-wife, to buy her shares in Kemkor. It takes some convincing to get her to agree to the transaction, but it soon becomes clear that Leana is a master manipulator. She even uses her guiles to convince Andries Barnhoorn to sell his company's Kemkor shares, and gets Albert to make her his sole heir.
3	September 19, 1985
Steve presents a new manufacturing process to Andries, who recognises it as potentially revolutionary and promises to give it some thought. Leana admits to Albert that she married him for his money, and he tells her that he spent all his money to buy back the shares and that the company is on the brink of bankruptcy. Shortly afterwards, Albert has a heartattack. Anna Meyer uses Albert's demise to manipulate public opinion.
4	September 26, 1985
Van Breda, an old adversory of Albert Jooste, tries to exploit Albert's death to gain control of the company, but he hasn't counted on Leana's ambitions. Andries returns home unexpectedly and gets an earful from his daughter, Annemarie. Leana's plans to marry Steve are dealt a blow: according to Albert's will, the moment she remarries, everything goes to Mercia. Leana makes plans to take Steve's project forward for Kemkor, but he refuses to sell the plans to her. Stienie arrives at the office to see Leana.
5	October 3, 1985
The pressure from her mother and her grief over Kobus finally gets to Mercia, and when the protesters disrupt a performance, she simply walks off stage and packs her bags to go find Kobus in Israel. At the airport she meets Steve and they become friends. Wessel leaves the army and Andries and Marietjie arrive separately to take him home. Wessel realises that they've split up and walks off. Leana takes her mother some money, but Stienie refuses to take the cash and locks her out of the house. After Leana and Andries have sealed the deal on the new manufacturing process, she reveals that Steve owns the copyright to the plans and that he will have to be managing director of the new consortium. Marietjie is worried that Wessel hasn't returned home yet. Wessel goes to stay with an old army friend, Leana's brother, Jack.
6	October 10, 1985
Jack needs money for his bike and when he steals watches from the shop where Suzy works, Suzy's supervisor suspects her. Then Jack visits Leana's office to get money. She tells him to leave, but he assaults her and her staff and vandalises the office. Steve realises that "Karlien" is really Mercia Meyer - and Albert Jooste's daughter. He asks her to marry her.
7	October 17, 1985
8	October 24, 1985
9	October 31, 1985
10	November 7, 1985
11	November 14, 1985
12	November 21, 1985
13	November 28, 1985
14	December 5, 1985
15	December 12, 1985
16	December 19, 1985
Steve and Mercia return to South Africa and Mercia has to immediately make an important decision regarding her future.
17	December 26, 1985
Marietjie and Leana meet by chance and have a chat. Hettie is very unhappy about this. Jack sees Suzie and Wessel meeting and this has alarming consequences.
18	January 2, 1986
When Jack arrives at Barnhoorn House in search of Wessel, he starts to terrorise Annemarie.
19	January 9, 1986
Stienie tries to persuade Leana to help her look for Jack.
20	January 16, 1986
Leana turns up at Andries's office and learns the good news about Steve's project.
21	January 23, 1986
Leana immediately suspects trouble when she arrives home and Elzetta says that Jack is waiting for her inside. She looks for her revolver, but can't find it.
22	January 30, 1986
Kobus Dreyer decides to leave Israel to take up an important post in South Africa. Steve shows Mercia the new house but there's tension when she insists on wanting to know more about his work. Steve and Leana eat out together under the pretext of 'work' and are unaware that Mercia is watching them.
23	February 6, 1986
Marietjie is relieved that Annemarie is her old self again. But the peace is soon shattered by Hannes Sieberhagen's flirtatious ways.
24	February 13, 1986
Elzetta is unhappy with Leana and asks Mercia to come and work for her. Suzie takes revenge after an argument with Jack in a caravan park.
25	February 20, 1986
Johan says farewell to Kobus, who leaves Israel for South Africa. Hettie and Hannes arrive at the Barnhoorn house to take Marietjie to the divorce court.
26	February 27, 1986
27	March 6, 1986
28	March 13, 1986
Wessel sets up camp in an isolated spot and is visited by Monika Greyling. When he goes for a walk with her, the other members of the Greyling family search his belongings and steal all his money.
29	March 20, 1986
Andries begs Marietjie to return to him but she refuses. Meanwhile, Wessel is on the trail of the Greyling family, hoping to recover his money.
30	March 27, 1986
After her baby's birth, Suzie goes to stay with Mrs. Simpson. She visits Wessel in hospital and is shocked by his poor condition. Steve and Mercia are very happy, although she still regards Leana as a threat.

== Season 2: 1988 ==
Season 2, consisting of 36 episodes, first premiered in South Africa on TV1 on March 10, 1988, and ended on November 10, 1988. It premiered on Sabc encore in November 2015 and concluded on August 2, 2016

No.	Original release date
31 (1)	March 10, 1988
Steve Anderson is involved in a serious discussion with Mr van Breda of Unikem. Successful advocate Johan Malan meets with his fiancee.
32 (2)	March 17, 1988
33 (3)	March 24, 1988
34 (4)	March 31, 1988
Leana wants to get Mercia Meyer back on to the stage. Bruce is always late, which irritates Stienie. Mercia has disturbing news for Herman and Anna.
35 (5)	April 7, 1988
36 (6)	April 14, 1988
When Marietjie gets back to her house after dropping Hettie off at the airport, she is surprised to vind a visitor. She is unnerved when she realises it is Mrs Duvenhage from Child Welfare - come to ask questions about the baby.
37 (7)	April 21, 1988
38 (8)	April 28, 1988
39 (9)	May 5, 1988
40 (10)	May 12, 1988
41 (11)	May 19, 1988
42 (12)	May 26, 1988
43 (13)	June 2, 1988
Wessel drops Hettie off at Leana's office and when he arrives to fetch her, flirts with Leana's receptionist who is uncertain about who he is but feels flattered by his attention.
44 (14)	June 9, 1988
45 (15)	June 16, 1988
Tallulah finds Steve asleep at his desk. She reminds him about Leana's visit and he has to hurry to make it on time. Bruce is pleased about the success of his new disco but his happiness is short-lived when Kenny and his friends arrive.
46 (16)	June 23, 1988
47 (17)	June 30, 1988
48 (18)	July 7, 1988
Van Breda organises a meeting with Andries to discuss a new business venture. Although Andries is keen on the venture, he must first discuss it with his lawyer. Anna is not well and Steve calls a doctor.
49 (19)	July 14, 1988
Mrs Duvenhage visits Suzie at work, but Suzie is unhelpful and a little rude. Leana goes out with someone and Bruce finds out about it. He goes to the restaurant and is surprised and bitter to see Leana and Steve together.
50 (20)	July 21, 1988
51 (21)	July 28, 1988
52 (22)	August 4, 1988
53 (23)	August 11, 1988
54 (24)	August 18, 1988
55 (25)	August 25, 1988
56 (26)	September 1, 1988
57 (27)	September 8, 1988
58 (28)	September 15, 1988
59 (29)	September 22, 1988
60 (30)	September 29, 1988
61 (31)	October 6, 1988
62 (32)	October 13, 1988
63 (33)	October 20, 1988
Anna pass away in her hospital bed. Bruce is arrested. After a car chase Mr Myburgh dies.
64 (34)	October 27, 1988
It's Anna Meyer's funeral. Marietjie is looking for Suzie. Mrs Duvenhage chats to Suzie. Bruces bail application is not accepted.
65 (35) Wessel never slept in his bed. Suzy go to court for her divorce. Weasel is hit by a car.	November 3, 1988
66 (36)Finale: The Barenhorens packs and move to Cape Town, Bruce's Trial start and he is sentenced to 3 years in prison. Liana and Steve, make up.	November 10, 1988
