= Wild Season =

- Directed by: Jans Rautenbach
- Release dates: January 1, 1967
- Running time: +90 minutes
- Country: South Africa
- Language: English

Wild Season is a 1967 South African drama film directed by Emil Nofal and starring Gert Van den Bergh, Marie Du Toit and Antony Thomas. A family operating a trawler off the South African coast, suffers numerous personal tragedies.

A number of scenes were directed by Jans Rautenbach, because Emil Nofal suffered from seasickness.

== Cast ==
- Gert Van den Bergh - Dirk Maritz
- Marie Du Toit - Martie Maritz
- Joe Stewardson - 1st Mate Tom Sheppard
- Janis Reinhardt - Jess Sheppard
- Antony Thomas - Michael Maritz
- Johan Du Plooy - Hennie de Waal
- Ian Yule - Andy Wilson
- Michael Spalletta - Mario

== Bibliography ==
- Tomaselli, Keyan. The cinema of apartheid: race and class in South African film. Routledge, 1989.
