= Johnny Halafihi =

Tongan boxer

Personal information
- Nationality: Tongan/New Zealander
- Born: August 25, 1933 Taunga, Tonga
- Died: July 30, 1985 (aged 64) United Kingdom
- Height: 5 ft 8 in (1.73 m)
- Weight: light heavy/heavyweight

Boxing career
- Stance: Orthodox

Boxing record
- Total fights: 59
- Wins: 35 (KO 20)
- Losses: 18 (KO 5)
- Draws: 6

Johnny Halafihi (born 25 August 1933 – 30 July 1985) was a Tongan-born New Zealand professional light-heavyweight/heavyweight boxer, active in the 1950s and 1960s.

Halafihi won the New Zealand Boxing Association light-heavyweight title, drew with Mike Holt for the vacant British Commonwealth light-heavyweight title, and was a challenger for the British Commonwealth light-heavyweight title against Chic Calderwood. His professional fighting weight varied from 168 lb (76 kg; 12 st 0 lb), i.e. light-heavyweight, to 177 1/2 lb (80.5 kg; 12 st 9.5 lb), i.e. heavyweight. He died in the United Kingdom.

In December 2009, he was inducted into the Tonga National Sports Hall of Fame.
