= Joe Stewardson =

South African actor

- Born: 1927; England
- Died: 1997
- Occupation: Actor
- Years active: 1965–1990
- Notable work: Katrina
- Children: Deon Stewardson (1951–2017); Matthew Stewardson (1974–2010)

Joe Stewardson was a South African film actor.

== Career ==
=== Partial filmography ===
- All the Way to Paris (1965)
- Wild Season (1967)
- Katrina (1969)
- My Way (1973)
- Target of an Assassin (1976)
- My Way II (1977)
- Flatfoot in Africa (1978)
- City of Blood (1982)
- Circles in a Forest (1990)
- Act of Piracy (1990)

== Death ==
He died in 1997.

== Bibliography ==
- Tomaselli, Keyan (1989). The Cinema of Apartheid: Race and Class in South African Film. Routledge (London, England). ISBN 978-0-415-02628-4.
