= Sandy the Seal =

1969 British film by Robert Lynn

- Directed by: Robert Lynn
- Screenplay by: Harry Alan Towers
- Produced by: Oliver A. Unger; Harry Alan Towers
- Starring: Heinz Drache; Marianne Koch
- Cinematography: Stephen Dade
- Music by: Malcolm Lockyer
- Distributed by: Tigon British Film Productions
- Release date: 1969
- Running time: 73 min.
- Countries: United Kingdom; South Africa
- Language: English

Sandy the Seal is a 1965 British family film directed by Robert Lynn and starring Heinz Drache, Marianne Koch and Gert Van den Bergh. Produced and co-written by Harry Alan Towers, the film was shot in South Africa in Technicolor and Techniscope II with sequences shot on Seal Island, South Africa. The film was released in the UK by Tigon British Film Productions in 1969.

== Plot ==
A lighthouse keeper finds an injured seal left by seal poachers. He brings the seal to his wife and two children who learn responsibility by looking after the seal who they name Sandy. Sandy accompanies the children on their adventures and activities and discovers the ship of the seal poachers who plan a return to the lighthouse keeper's island for more valuable pelts.

== Cast ==
- Heinz Drache as Jan Van Heerden
- Marianne Koch as Karen Van Heerden
- David Richards as David
- Anne Mervis as Anne
- Gert Van den Bergh as Jacobson
- Bill Brewer as Lowenstein
- Gabriel Bayman as Lofty
- Brian O'Shaughnessy as MacKenzie

== Reception ==
The Monthly Film Bulletin wrote: "Relatively painless cuddly animal adventure, unswervingly true to form and as cute as they come but quite pleasingly photographed. The seals, who show considerably more animation than their human co-stars, may appeal to undemanding children, and the poaching scenes are realistic enough to give accompanying adults qualms about sealskin coats."
