= Hellgate (1989 film) =

- Promotional poster
- Directed by: William A. Levey
- Screenplay by: Michael S. O'Rourke
- Produced by: Anant Singh
- Starring: Ron Palillo; Abigail Wolcott; Carel Trichardt
- Cinematography: Peter Palmer
- Edited by: Mark Baard; Chris Barnes; Max Lemon
- Music by: Barry Fasman; Dana Walden
- Production companies: Ghostown Film Management; Distant Horizon
- Distributed by: New World Pictures; Vidmark Entertainment
- Release dates: December 1989 (United Kingdom); 8 August 1990 (United States)
- Running time: 91 minutes
- Countries: United States; South Africa
- Language: English

Hellgate is a 1989 supernatural horror film directed by William A. Levey, written by Michael S. O'Rourke, and starring Ron Palillo, Abigail Wolcott, and Carel Trichardt. It follows two young couples who become embroiled in the mystery of a desolate ghost town, Hellgate, where a young woman was kidnapped and murdered by a biker gang in 1959. It was released in the United States directly-to-video in August 1990 through Vidmark Entertainment.

== Plot ==
College students Pam, her best friend Bobby, and Chuck are awaiting the arrival of Bobby's boyfriend Matt at a remote cabin in the Sierra Nevada mountains. Bobby tells the story of the Hellgate hitchhiker, an urban legend about a spectral female hitchhiker alleged to be the ghost of a woman, Josie Carlyle, the daughter of a mining magnate who was kidnapped by a biker gang in 1959 and brutally murdered in the now-ghost town of Hellgate, where her father served as mayor. After Josie's murder, a gold mining prospector uncovered a strange crystal in an abandoned mine, which he brought to her father, Lucas. Lucas, distraught over Josie's death, used the crystal's powers to reanimate her corpse, inadvertently wreaking supernatural havoc on anything that came in contact with it.

Meanwhile, Matt stops at the same diner from where Josie was abducted years prior, seeking directions from a waitress there. He subsequently encounters Josie on the road and offers her a ride, unaware she is a ghost. The two drive through Hellgate, which appears populated by a number of ghostly figures meandering in a trancelike state. Matt drops Josie off at her dilapidated father's mansion, where he is invited inside. Josie seduces Matt, but he is frightened away by Lucas, armed with the crystal, and flees.

Upon arriving at the cabin, Matt explains to Bobby his encounter with Josie. That night, Matt, Bobby, and Pam visit the local diner for coffee. In an abandoned car shop next-door, they find a newspaper article detailing the disappearance of Buzz, the leader of the biker gang, after Josie's disappearance. They are then attacked by Zonk, a boorish mechanic, who warns them against returning to Hellgate. Matt, Bobby, Pam, and Chuck drive to Hellgate to investigate despite Zonk's warnings, and find Josie's grave in the local cemetery. They are met by a series of ghostly individuals in town, and witness Josie naked in a dance hall, where several lone couples dance.

In the cemetery, Lucas invokes the powers of the crystal to bring the various deceased residents of Hellgate back to life, and they begin to attack Matt, Pam, Chuck, and Bobby. Bobby and Chuck return to the car, but are confronted by Lucas, who decapitates Chuck. In a saloon, Bobby witnesses a ghostly pianist. Matt and Pam arrive moments later and find a stunned Bobby. Matt and Pam leave to get help, as Bobby refuses to go back outside. Alone in the saloon, Bobby watches in disbelief as a vaudeville show is put on by the ghosts before Lucas strangles her, turning her into one of the undead.

Meanwhile, Matt and Pam go to the Carlyle mansion in search of a telephone, but the call is cut short when Matt reaches the police station. Josie appears and lures Matt upstairs and again seduces him, before Pam arrives and shoots Josie with a rifle, causing her to fall from a window. Matt and Pam flee, where they are met by Bobby and Chuck in their Jeep, both now apparent zombies. Matt and Pam manage to escape in Josie's vintage car, only to find Lucas clinging to the top. Lucas attempts to attack them with the crystal, but Matt crashes into a building, throwing him from the vehicle, after which a building collapses on him. Matt and Pam flee the town. Meanwhile, Josie wanders through the streets of Hellgate.

== Cast ==
- Ron Palillo as Matt
- Abigail Wolcott as Josie Carlyle
- Carel Trichardt as Lucas Carlyle
- Petrea Curran as Pam
- Evan J. Klisser as Chuck
- Joanne Warde as Bobby (as Joanne Ward)
- Frank Notaro as Buzz (as Frank Notard)
- Lance Vaughan as Zonk

== Production ==
Director William A. Levey had previously filmed Committed starring Jennifer O'Neill and Ron Palillo in South Africa, which led to his hiring as director for Hellgate, another South African-based production. The film was shot in a real abandoned town in South Africa with a cast largely made up of South African actors. Levey initially planned to cast Embeth Davidtz in one of the lead female roles, but ultimately chose not to hire her as she was unable to speak with a convincing American accent at the time. Abigail Wolcott, a model who was touring Europe and South Africa, was discovered by Levey and cast as Josie. Ron Palillo, who had previously starred in Levey's Committed and Skatetown, U.S.A., was given the lead role of Matt.

== Release ==
Hellgate was distributed on home video by New World Pictures in the United Kingdom in December 1989. By the week of 22 December 1989, the film had ranked number 8 in the United Kingdom's top ten video releases.

It was released in the United States directly-to-video on 8 August 1990 by Vidmark Entertainment, as well as on LaserDisc. Anchor Bay Entertainment released the film as a double feature DVD with The Pit (1981) in 2004.

In 2014, Arrow Video released a limited edition Blu-ray in the United Kingdom. The Canadian distributor Unobstructed View released a Blu-ray edition in North America on 27 June 2023.

== Reception ==
=== Contemporary ===
The Toronto Star awarded the film a favorable three out of five star rating, noting: "At least the makers of this one had the brains to bring in a casual, loose mood to the proceedings" and "making not-so-subtle allusions to everything from Carnival of Souls to He Knows You're Alone."

Reviewing the film for the Leicester Mercury, Val Marriott described the film's special effects as "suitably terrifying," adding that director William A. Levey "has a tremendous advantage over others who make horror films purely to show evil creatures, weird effects and violent action and unsavoury corpses littered everywhere—he truly loves film-making and does not allow the art form to become drowned in gore."

=== Retrospective ===
Andrew Smith of Popcorn Pictures gave the film an abysmal score of 1/10, writing, "Hellgate isn’t just bad, it’s on the same ‘utterly terrible’ plane of existence as the likes of Troll and Raging Sharks. It's not a film you can even watch if you're curious about how awful it is. Just forget it ever existed." Michael Weldon in The Psychotronic Video Guide gave the film a negative review, noting: "Ron Palillo (from Welcome Back, Kotter), who was nearly 40 at the time, stars in this awful, irritating teen horror movie."

Graeme Clark from The Spinning Image awarded the film 1/10 stars, calling it "utter garbage" and criticized the film's script, phony special effects, and acting. In his book Creature Features: The Science Fiction, Fantasy, and Horror Movie Guide (2000), John Stanley described the film as "Direct-to-video junk designed for visual shocks rather than coherency."

Daniel Goodwin, refiewng the film for Scream magazine in 2014, wrote that director William A. Levey "pumps the film’s action with a bracing, playful mayhem which slightly elevates the wafer thin story and kill-fodder characters. While endearing, Hellgate's rubber creatures, fuzzy visuals and wonky, dream-like set pieces fail to compensate for its clumsy plot foundation." Andrew Marshall of Starburst magazine gave the film a mixed review, writing: "The whole film feels like a feature-length episode of Garth Marenghi’s Darkplace and should be taken about as seriously... in terms of professional and objective analysis of the film’s quality, it’s a 2, but if you’re a connoisseur of the unintentional comedy value of irredeemably atrocious films, consider it an 8."

== See also ==
- List of horror films of 1989

== Sources ==
- Hayward, Anthony (1990). "Video Releases". Film Review 1990-1. London, England: Virgin Books. ISBN 978-0-863-69374-8.
- Stanley, John (2000). Creature Features: The Science Fiction, Fantasy, and Horror Movie Guide. New York City, New York: Berkley Boulevard Books. ISBN 978-0-4251-7517-0.
- Weldon, Michael (1996). The Psychotronic Video Guide. New York City, New York: Macmillan. p. 259. ISBN 978-0-312-13149-4.
- Young, R. G. (2000). The Encyclopedia of Fantastic Film: Ali Baba to Zombies. New York City, New York: Applause Books. ISBN 978-1-557-83269-6.
