= Song of Africa =

South African musical film

Song of Africa is a 1951 South African black-and-white film directed by Emil Nofal.

The film follows a man who returns to his village with a gramophone and musical instruments to start a Zulu jazz band. Daniel Makiza and the Black Broadway Boys appear in the film.

It is one of four films made between 1949 and 1951 documenting original music and performances by Africans. One scholar described the plot as thin.

== See also ==
- African Jim
- The Magic Garden (1951 film)
