= The Naked Prey =

1965 film by Cornel Wilde

- Theatrical release poster
- Directed by: Cornel Wilde
- Written by: Clint Johnston; Don Peters
- Produced by: Cornel Wilde; Sven Persson
- Starring: Cornel Wilde; Ken Gampu; Gert van den Bergh
- Distributed by: Paramount Pictures
- Release dates: June 3, 1965 (San Sebastián Film Festival); March 23, 1966 (United States)
- Running time: 96 minutes
- Country: United States
- Languages: English; Afrikaans; Nguni languages
- Budget: $647,649

The Naked Prey is a 1965 American adventure film directed and co-produced by Cornel Wilde, who also stars in the lead role. Set in the South African veldt, the film's plot centers around a safari guide trying to survive in the veldt's harsh environment, while trying to avoid death at the hands of vengeful African warriors. The story is loosely based on the experiences of American explorer John Colter. The screenplay earned writers Clint Johnston and Don Peters an Academy Award nomination for Best Original Screenplay.

The film premiered at the 1965 San Sebastián International Film Festival, then was released in the United States on March 23, 1966. Made on a scant budget of less than $700,000, the film was shot entirely on location in southern Africa.

== Plot summary ==
In colonial era Southern Africa, a professional safari guide leads a haughty investor and his troop on an elephant hunt through the African veldt. When the group comes to a local tribe's territory, the Africans require a toll to be paid for walking through their territory. The guide demands that they be paid, but the expedition's investor ignores this advice, brushes the Africans aside, and knocks down the tribal leader, who is barring his way. No violent retribution immediately occurs, and the Europeans are allowed to walk past the warriors guarding their border.

Later on, the guide and investor are arguing about their elephant kills. The investor brags about killing many more elephants than anyone else. The guide reminds him, "Everyone else only shot ivory-bearing elephants", to which the investor only laughs. During this conversation, warriors from a local village discover the poachers' camp, and armed only with spears, capture or kill the entire group.

After a victory march of the Europeans to the African's home village, most are executed using various torture methods. The guide is spared until the last. He is stripped naked and then an arrow is fired into the air. The guide is ordered at the point of a spear to run. Once he passes the fallen arrow, he is chased by another warrior in waiting. His pursuer throws a spear at him and misses, which the guide uses to kill his pursuer. Afterwards, he takes the warrior's sandals, loincloth and supplies then evades his pursuers. The warriors, grief-stricken about their dead friend, argue about continuing the hunt; some of them continue the pursuit.

Over the course of the pursuit, several of the warriors fall, either killed by the guide or the ravenous wildlife. The guide comes across an African village and camps nearby. He succeeds in stealing some barbecue and sneaking away, only to be awoken later by the rifle fire of Arab slavers. The guide cuts captured slaves from their rope bindings, has a minor melee with the slave guards, and prepares to meet the slaver captain in combat, just as the captain falls into a ditch filled with large thorns that enter his eyes.

Amid the chaos of the melee, the guide meets a young African girl who is hiding from the slavers. The guide escapes the slavers by jumping into a river, but is incapacitated after going over a large waterfall. Luckily, the girl finds him on the river bank and is able to revive him. They become friends after that, and as he travels with her for the next few days, he sings a 19th-century drinking song "Little Brown Jug". The child in return sings a song in her own language. They later part ways near an area that she indicates as her homeland, which she is unwilling to leave.

His surviving pursuers continue tracking him. The guide finally reaches the colonial fort from which the safari had originally set out. The lead pursuer, now running closely behind him, is shot dead by rifle fire from the fort's soldiers, just a second before the warrior can land a fatal blow. When the guide finally reaches the safety of the fort, amidst the movements of the colonial troops, he turns and gives a saluting nod to the leader of his pursuers, who returns it, acknowledging the guide's final victory.

== Cast ==
- Cornel Wilde as Man: The guide, who is the unnamed protagonist of the film, and the eponymous "naked prey." He is a professional safari guide, and by the end of the movie, he is left as the sole survivor of his group after all other members are killed by tribesmen.
- Gert van den Bergh as 2nd Man: A member of the safari troupe. He is killed by the tribe.
- Ken Gampu as Leader of the Warriors: The leader of the tribe who is disrespected by the safari travellers.
- Bella Randels as Little Girl: A native girl who saves the safari guide from drowning and accompanies him on his passage.
- Patrick Mynhardt as Safari Overseer/Slave Dealer/Irish Soldier: Mynhardt plays three roles.
- Sandy Nkomo, Eric Mcanyana, John Marcus, Richard Mashiya, Franklyn Mdhluli, Fusi Zazayokwe, Joe Dlamini, Jose Sithole and Horace Gilman play warriors that pursue the guide.

== Production ==
The Naked Prey was filmed on location in Southern Africa. (Note: Sources differ on which country the film was shot in.) The film's screenplay was only nine pages long. The film's opening titles were accompanied by paintings illustrated by local artist Andrew Motjuoadi.

== Critical reception ==
The minimal dialog, richly realized African settings, and emphasis on making "the chase (and violent combat along the way) a subject unto itself, rather than the climax to a conventional story" distinguish Naked Prey as an innovative and influential adventure film. Although it is considered a small classic today, it received mixed reviews at the time of its release.

Robert Alden of The New York Times, reacting to the brutality of some of the early scenes, dismissed the film as "poor and tasteless motion-picture entertainment", but did acknowledge its "authentic African setting" and "effective use of tribal drums and native music." Roger Ebert of the Chicago Sun-Times, taking a different tack, called The Naked Prey "pure fantasy" of the "great white hunter" variety, "Sure, it's nice to think you could outrun half a dozen hand-picked African warriors simply because you'd been to college and read Thoreau, but the truth is they'd nail you before you got across the river and into the trees."

Other reviewers were more enthusiastic. In Time, the film was described as "a classic, single-minded epic of survival with no time out for fainthearted blondes or false heroics" where "natives are not the usual faceless blacks but human beings whose capacity for violence the hero quickly matches." Variety reviewer praised the documentary-style use of nature photography to show "the pattern of repose, pursuit, sudden death and then repose" that characterizes the chase.

Retrospectively, the film's reputation has grown. On Rotten Tomatoes, the film holds an approval rating of 86%, based on 14 reviews, with an average rating of 6.93/10. Metacritic gave the film a 64 out of 100 rating, indicating "generally favorable reviews, based on 12 reviews. In July 2016, Matthew Thrift of the British Film Institute named the film among the 10 greatest "chase films" and praised its "lush widescreen lensing" that "captures all the natural beauty and brutality of the African savannah".

In 2025, The Hollywood Reporter listed The Naked Prey as having the best stunts of 1966.

=== Accolades ===
Award	Subject	Category	Result	Ref
Academy Awards	Clint Johnston and Don Peters	Best Original Screenplay	Nominated	

== Home media ==
The Naked Prey was released on DVD by The Criterion Collection in January 2008.

== Soundtrack ==
The soundtrack consists of African tribal chants, natural sounds, and occasional dialogue, in English and otherwise. There are no subtitles, and incidental music is mostly absent. It features Nguni tribal songs specifically recorded for the film. A vinyl LP The Naked Prey was released in 1966 on Folkways Records. It was re-released as Cornel Wilde's The Naked Prey in CD form on Latitude/Locust Music in 2004.

== Comic book adaptation ==
- Dell Movie Classic: The Naked Prey (December 1966)

== Cinematic influence ==
As teenagers, Joel and Ethan Coen shot their own version of The Naked Prey on a Super 8 film camera. They called it Zeimers in Zambezi and cast neighbor Mark Zimering in the lead role.

== Cultural influence ==
The progressive rock group Coheed and Cambria was originally named Shabütie after the African chant from the film. Shabütie translates to "Naked Prey".

== In popular culture ==
In the first scene of the Mad Men season 5 episode "Far Away Places," Abe coaxes a distracted and reluctant Peggy to go see the film with him. His pitch: "You're resisting a chance to see Cornel Wilde naked? I heard he wrestles a boa constrictor. Sounds pretty dirty."

The 266th episode of Cheers is titled "Bar Wars VII: The Naked Prey".

In the movie Where's Poppa?, the main character's brother (played by Ron Leibman) is regularly mugged while taking a shortcut through Central Park. In one mugging, the group of muggers refer to The Naked Prey as they strip him and then chase him. Garrett Morris plays one of the muggers.

== See also ==
- Survival film, about the film genre, with a list of related films
