= Marie Du Toit =

South African film actress

- Occupation: Actress
- Years active: 1962–1977
- Notable work: Wild Season

Marie Du Toit (or Marié Du Toit) is a South African film actress.

== Career ==
She appeared in eight films between 1962 and 1977.

== Filmography ==
Filmography
Year	Title	Genre	Role	Notes
1962	Voor Sononder	western	Martie	
1967	Wild Season	drama	Martie Maritz	
1968	Die Kandidaat	drama	Paula Neethling	
1971	The Manipulator (also known as African Story)		Harriet Tiller	
1972	The Big Game (also known as Control Factor)	action, science-fiction drama	Lucie Handley	
1973	My Way (also known as The Winners)	family-drama	Fran Maddox	
1974	Ongewenste Vreemdeling	romance-drama	Eleen	
1977	My Way II	family		
