= Cyanide in the Beefcake =

Studio album by Johannes Kerkorrel
- Released: 1994
- Genre: Rock music
- Label: Talisman
- Producer: Unknown

Johannes Kerkorrel chronology
Bloudruk (1992)	Cyanide in the Beefcake (1994)	Ge-trans-for-meer (1996)

Cyanide in the Beefcake, the third studio album by Johannes Kerkorrel, was released in early 1994. After Kerkorrel's death in 2002 the lyrics to the title track were said to have been a possible prediction of his suicide.

== Track listing ==
1. Daar is Geen
2. Absoluut Goed
3. Speel My Pop
4. Dirty Business
5. Elektriese Stoel
6. Te Veel vir 'n Witvrou in Afrika
7. Awuwa (Dansen)
8. River of Love
9. Mozambique
10. Alles Beter Binne die Droom
11. Waiting for Godot

== Personnel ==
- Ian Herman
- Andre Abrahamse
- Rudi Genbrugge
- Didi Kriel
- Mauritz Lotz
- James Phillips
- Coleski Broers
- Wendy Oldfield
- Lydia Von Hagen
- Victor Masondo
- Lloyd Marti

== Awards ==
- 1995 SAMA – Best Pop Music Performance
