= Bloudruk =

Studio album by Johannes Kerkorrel
- Released: 1992
- Studio: Studio Audiolab
- Genre: Rock music
- Label: Tusk Music
- Producer: Didi Kriel, Lloyd Ross

Johannes Kerkorrel chronology
Eet Kreef (1989)	Bloudruk (1992)	Cyanide in the Beefcake (1994)

Bloudruk (Afrikaans: "Blueprint"), the second studio album by Johannes Kerkorrel, was released in 1992.

Kerkorrel sang the track Halala Afrika (Rejoice Africa) at Nelson Mandela's presidential inauguration ceremony in 1994.

== Track listing ==
1. Halala Afrika
2. Ballade van 'n Mynwerker
3. Sy Beweeg
4. Somer
5. Dêrde Wereld
6. Revolusie
7. Pers Reën
8. Toekomsrap
9. Hoe Ek Voel
10. Blou Aarde

== Personnel ==
- Mauritz Lotz: Acoustic and electric guitars
- Didi Kriel: Keyboards, additional bass (electric and stand-up)
- Ian Herman: Drums
- Victor Masondo: Electric and stand-up bass
- Mike Faure: Saxophone
- Lloyd Ross: Acoustic and electric guitars, lead guitar on "Blou Aarde"
- Hanepoot Van Tonder
- Willem Moller: Acoustic and electric guitars
- Amanda Strydom: Backing vocals
- Reuben Samuels: Drums, percussion
- Cutt Glass: Backing vocals
- Nippy Cripwell du Toit: Electric and stand-up bass
- Lloyd Martin: Drums, percussion
