= Jannie totsiens =

- Directed by: Jans Rautenbach
- Release dates: January 1, 1970
- Running time: +108 minutes
- Country: South Africa
- Language: Afrikaans

Jannie totsiens is a 1970 South African horror film directed by Jans Rautenbach and starring Cobus Rossouw, Katinka Heyns, Jill Kirkland and Don Leonard. A new arrival to a mental institute is ostracised by the other patients, until they use him as a scapegoat when another patient dies. It has been viewed as representing an allegory of South African society at the time. It was the first horror film made in South Africa.

== Main cast ==
- Hermien Dommisse as Magda
- Katinka Heyns as Linda
- Jill Kirkland as Liz
- Patrick Mynhardt as George
- Cobus Rossouw as Jannie Pienaar
- Don Leonard
- Dulcie Van den Bergh

== Bibliography ==
- Tomaselli, Keyan (1989). The Cinema of Apartheid: Race and Class in South African Film. Routledge.
- Waddell, Calum (2025). South African Horror Cinema. Bloomsbury Academic. ISBN 978-1501385063.
