= Gert van den Bergh =

South African actor (1920–1968)

Gert Van den Bergh
- Born: Gert Nicolaas; 16 October 1920; Johannesburg, Transvaal, South Africa
- Died: 16 February 1968 (aged 47); Cape Town, Cape Province, South Africa
- Occupation: Actor
- Years active: 1958–1968

Gert Van den Bergh (16 October 1920 – 16 February 1968) was a South African film actor. He was married to Dulcie (Magdeld Magdalena) van den Bergh (23 August 1928 – 8 November 1997). (Née Smit)

== Career ==
=== Selected filmography ===
- Die Lig van 'n Eeu (1942)
- Pinkie se Erfenis (1946) - Willem
- Simon Beyers (1947) - Nicolaas Beyers
- Die Kaskenades van Dokter Kwak (1948) - Poggenpoel
- Hans-die-Skipper (1952) - Johan
- Inspan (1953) - Dirk de Vos
- 'n Plan is 'n Boerdery (1954) - Wessel Maritz
- Vadertjie Langbeen (1955) - Jacques (voice, uncredited)
- Matieland! (1955) - MC at Fruit Festival (voice, uncredited)
- Dis Lekker om te Lewe (1957) - Commandant (voice, uncredited)
- Diamond Safari (1958) - Compound Manager
- Fratse in die Vloot (1958) - Seaman (voice, uncredited)
- Nooi van my Hart (1959) - Hans (voice, uncredited)
- Rip van Wyk (1960) - 'Oom'
- Die Vlugteling (1960) - Detective Sgt. Malan
- Basie (1961) - Police sergeant (voice, uncredited)
- The Hellions (1961) - Dr. Weiser
- Die Tweede Slaapkamer (1962) - van Dyk
- Tom Dirk en Herrie (1962) - Grové
- Stropers van die Laeveld (1962)
- Jy's Lieflik Vanaand (1962) - Anton Fourie
- Die Ruiter in die Nag (1963) - Lodewyk van Renen
- Mozambique (1964) - The Arab
- Zulu (1964) - Lieutenant Josef Adendorff
- Piet my Niggie (1964) - Radio announcer (voice, uncredited)
- Victim Five (1964) - Vanberger
- Seven Against the Sun (1964) - Cpl. Smit
- Tokoloshe (1965)
- Debbie (1965) - Dr. Chris Hugo
- The Naked Prey (1965) - 2nd Man
- Diamond Walkers (1965) - Piet Truter
- King Hendrik (1965) - Koos de Wet
- Die Wonderwêreld van Kammie Kamfer (1965)
- Sandy the Seal (1965) - Jacobson
- Der Rivonia-Prozess (1966) - Alan Paton
- The Second Sin (1966) - Anton Rossouw
- Wild Season (1967) - Dirk Maritz
- The Professor and the Beauty Queen (1967) - Dr. Koos Hattingh
- The Jackals (1967) - Drunk (uncredited)
- Die Kandidaat (1968) - Lourens Niemand
- Rider in the Night (1968)
