= Johannes Kerkorrel =

- Born: Ralph John Rabie; 27 March 1960; Johannesburg, South Africa
- Died: 12 November 2002 (aged 42) Kleinmond, near Cape Town, South Africa
- Years active: 1985–2002

Johannes Kerkorrel (27 March 1960 – 12 November 2002), born Ralph John Rabie, was a South African singer-songwriter, journalist and playwright.

== Career ==
Rabie, who was born in Johannesburg, worked as a journalist for the Afrikaans newspapers Die Burger and Rapport. In 1986, Rabie started performing politically themed cabaret at arts festivals under his new stage name (kerkorrel meaning church organ in Afrikaans). At that time, apartheid was at its nadir under State President P.W. Botha's National Party-led government.

In 1987, Rabie was fired by Rapport for using quotes from Botha's speeches in his music; he then became a full-time musician and performer under the name Johannes Kerkorrel en die Gereformeerde Blues Band (Johannes Kerkorrel and the Reformed Blues Band), a deliberate reference to the Reformed Church. The band also included the Afrikaans singer-songwriter Koos Kombuis. Their brand of new Afrikaans music was dubbed alternatiewe Afrikaans (alternative Afrikaans) and exposed divergent political views to a new generation of Afrikaners.

In 1985, they released the album Eet Kreef (Eat Lobster) on the now-defunct Shifty Records label, which was a commercial success despite its tracks being banned from radio airplay by the state-controlled South African Broadcasting Corporation, which was the government mouthpiece. Colloquially, 'Eet Kreef' is ambiguous, meaning either 'Enjoy!' or 'Get lost!'. The subsequent regional tour of college campuses and art festivals was called Voëlvry (literally free as a bird but here meaning outlawed), and Rabie's controversial reinvention of Afrikaans popular music became known as the Voëlvry movement.

In 1990, Rabie visited Amsterdam, and almost simultaneously the track "Hillbrow" from the Eet Kreef album became a hit in Belgium, and Rabie followed its success with a solo tour. In subsequent years he enjoyed substantial artistic success in Belgium and the Netherlands, and spent much of his time in Belgium. Here he also befriended Stef Bos, a Dutch cabaret artist, with whom he would share a number of concerts.

== Death ==
Rabie died by suicide on 12 November 2002 in Kleinmond, near Hermanus on the Western Cape coast, hanging himself on a tree. He was survived by his long-term partner, and by his ex-wife and son.

== Awards ==
- 1995 SAMA – Best Pop Music Performance for Cyanide in the Beefcake
- 1997 SAMA – Best Male Vocalist and Best Adult Contemporary Album: Afrikaans for Ge-trans-for-meer
- 2001 Geraas – Best pop album and Best adaptation for Die Ander Kant
- 2013 SAMA – Lifetime Achievement Award

== Discography ==
- Eet Kreef (1985)
- Bloudruk (1992)
- Cyanide in the Beefcake (1994)
- Ge-trans-for-meer (1996)
- Tien Jaar Later (1998)
- Sing Koos du Plessis (1999)
- Die Ander Kant (2000)
- Voëlvry Die Toer (2002)
- Kerkorrel – Best Of: Pêrels Voor Die Swyne (2003)
- Hoe Ek Voel (2012) – issued to commemorate the 10 year anniversary of Rabie's death

== Tributes ==
After Rabie's death, several artists recorded tribute songs to his life and work. An incomplete list follows:

- Koos Kombuis - Johnny Is Nie Dood Nie
- Stef Bos – Pelgrimsrus
- Riku Lätti – Ysbeer
- Amanda Strydom – Ek Het Gedroom
- Karen Zoid – Foto Teen Die Muur
- Jak De Priester – Kerkorrel
- Kristoe Strauss – Sit Dit Self Af
- Jan Blohm – Johnny K
- Valiant Swart - Sonvanger
- Valiant Swart en Koos Kombuis – Kleinmond Koebaai

== Covers ==
Rabie is a much covered artist. Among the cover versions that exist are:

- Stef Bos – Hillbrow
- Riku Lätti – Somer
- Amanda Strydom – Hoe Ek Voel and Halala Afrika
- Van Coke Kartel - Energie
- af:Refentse Morake - Halala Afrika

== Legacy ==
The film Johnny is nie dood nie portrays a fictional group of friends meeting up after his suicide, looking back to the events leading up to the Voëlvry movement, and how his music inspired and influenced them.

the 2005 documentary Who Killed Johannes Kerkorrel explores about his life and death.

== See also ==
- Bernoldus Niemand
- Koos Kombuis
