= Katrina (1969 film) =

- Directed by: Jans Rautenbach
- Screenplay by: Emil Nofal
- Based on: Try for White by Basil Warner
- Produced by: Emil Nofal
- Starring: Katinka Heyns; Jill Kirkland; Don Leonard
- Cinematography: Vincent Cox
- Edited by: Peter Henkel
- Music by: Roy Martin
- Production company: Emil Nofal Productions
- Release date: 1969
- Running time: 100 min
- Languages: English & Afrikaans
- Box office: R900 000

Katrina is a 1969 South African drama film directed by Jans Rautenbach and starring Katinka Heyns, Jill Kirkland and Don Leonard. Based on a play called Try for White by Basil Warner, the film depicts the lives of a family of a Coloured South Africans, who in the apartheid system are considered neither white nor black, in which Katrina, the daughter, attempts to appear white, before her secret is exposed. The screenplay was written by Emil Nofal.

== Plot ==
Katrina September, a coloured woman, in South Africa decides to leave her family, taking her son Paul away with her, to live as white-passing in order to live a better life during apartheid. Katrina goes by the name Catherine Winters in her secret life. However, their lives get messy when both herself and Paul meet their love interests. Paul does not know he is coloured which causes problems when he starts dating Alida Brink, a white girl. Alex Trewellyn, a white Anglican priest, starts to fall in love with Katrina and her secrets start to unravel.

When Katrina's mother dies, she is forced to return home to her family, where her brother, Adam September, is upset with Katrina. Adam wishes for Paul, who has just returned from England with a medical degree, to work in their village.

== Cast ==
- Katinka Heyns as Alida Brink
- Jill Kirkland as Catherine Winters / Katrina September
- Don Leonard as Kimberley Jacobs
- Cobus Rossouw as Adam September
- Joe Stewardson as Father Alex Trewellyn
- Carel Trichardt as Mr. Brink
- Reghardt van den Bergh as Alida's brother
- Ian Strauss
- Simon Sabela
- Anthony Handley

== Production ==
Katrina was written and produced by Emil Nofal, directed by Jans Rautenbach. The crew consisted of Peter Henkel as editor, Vincent Cox as cinematography and composition by Roy Martin.

== Release ==
The film was released in 1969 and grossed at approximately R900 000 at the box office.

== Reception ==
Katrina has been viewed by approximately 400 000 white and coloured viewers.

The film was originally released in English and Afrikaans, but has since been dubbed into eleven other languages. Katrina also entered the 1970 Cannes Film Festival.

Katrina was controversially received by its Afrikaans audience. Rautenbach supposedly received death threats from right wing Afrikaans citizens.

=== Newspaper reviews ===
Katrina was reviewed by Ned Munger on the 1st of December 1969 in the Africa Report, and the article was titled "An Outstanding South African Film About Race Relations Provokes Mixed Reactions and Reflections" in Issue 8 of Volume 14.

== Bibliography ==
- Tomaselli, Keyan (2013). The Cinema of Apartheid: Race and Class in South African Film. Routledge. ISBN 978-1-317-92839-3.
- Botha, Martin (2013). South African Cinema 1896-2010. Intellect Books. ISBN 978-1-78320-330-7.
