= Flatfoot in Africa =

Piedone l'africano (Flatfoot in Africa)
- Directed by: Steno
- Written by: Steno; Giovanni Simonelli; Franco Verucci
- Starring: Bud Spencer; Enzo Cannavale; Dagmar Lassander
- Cinematography: Alberto Spagnoli
- Edited by: Mario Morra
- Music by: Guido & Maurizio De Angelis
- Production companies: Laser Films; Rialto Film
- Distributed by: Titanus; Medusa Film
- Release date: 1978
- Running time: 108 minutes
- Countries: Italy; South Africa
- Language: Italian

Piedone l'africano (internationally released as Flatfoot in Africa, Knock-Out Cop and The K.O. Cop) is a 1978 Italian-West German "poliziottesco"-comedy film directed by Steno and starring Bud Spencer. It is the third and penultimate chapter in the "Flatfoot" film series. It is preceded by Flatfoot and Flatfoot in Hong Kong and followed by Flatfoot in Egypt.

== Plot ==
A trail of illicit diamonds takes Flatfoot and his acquaintance, Naples police commissioner Caputo, from Johannesburg to Swakopmund in the hopes of breaking up a South African smuggling ring. They are joined by Bodo, an African child, and confounded in their search by corrupt mining officials and an antagonistic inspector in the South West African police.

== Cast ==
- Bud Spencer as Insp. "Flatfoot" Rizzo
- Enzo Cannavale as Caputo
- Werner Pochath as Spiros
- Joe Stewardson as Smollet
- Carel Trichardt as captain Muller
- Dagmar Lassander as Margy Connors
- Desmond Thompson as Inspector Desmond
- Baldwin Dakile as Bodo
- Antonio Allocca as Receptionist
- Percy Hogan as Dimpo
- Giovanni Cianfriglia as Bus Hooligan

== Trivia ==
- During filming in South Africa, there was an incident when Bud Spencer wanted to eat together with black actor Baldwyn Dakile, who played Bodo, in a restaurant in Johannesburg. The boy was denied entry due to apartheid. Spencer then decided not to eat in the restaurant either, but was later informed by the police chief that he would be expelled from the country immediately if this behavior was repeated in the future.
- Bud Spencer was not dubbed in the original version in this film, as in many of his films, but can be heard in his own voice.
- The title song Freedom is interpreted by Guido De Angelis and Maurizio De Angelis under the pseudonym I Charango.
- Since the film was set in South Africa, which was ostracized internationally because of the apartheid prevailing there, the film was not shown in the GDR.
