= Ge-trans-for-meer =

Studio album by Johannes Kerkorrel
- Released: 1996
- Genre: Rock music
- Label: One World Entertainment
- Producer: Unknown

Johannes Kerkorrel chronology
Cyanide in the Beefcake (1994)	Ge-trans-for-meer (1996)	Tien Jaar Later (1998)

Ge-trans-for-meer, is the fourth studio album of Johannes Kerkorrel, which was released in 1996.

== Track listing ==
1. Sê-Sê
2. Europhobia
3. Oe, die Kaap
4. Changes
5. Paradys
6. Elvis
7. Dawid Ryk
8. Wanhoop in die Vrystaat
9. Snor City
10. My Ewig Ontwykende Beminde
11. Boogskutter
12. Onder in my Whiskeyglas
13. Foto
14. Ewig Jonk
15. Berge Nog So Blou

== Awards ==
- 1997 SAMA – Best Male Vocalist and Best Adult Contemporary Album: Afrikaans
