= Eet Kreef =

Studio album by Johannes Kerkorrel
- Released: 1985
- Genre: Rock music
- Label: Shifty
- Producer: Lloyd Ross

Johannes Kerkorrel chronology
Eet Kreef (1985)	Bloudruk (1992)

Eet Kreef is the first studio album by Johannes Kerkorrel and the Gereformeerde Blues Band. Released in 1985 on the now-defunct Shifty Records label, the album was a commercial success despite its tracks being banned from radio airplay by the South African Broadcasting Corporation.

== Track listing ==
All tracks written by Johannes Kerkorrel, unless otherwise noted.

1. Sit Dit Af
2. Tronk
3. Liefde
4. Ossewa
5. Hillbrow
6. Donker Donker Land
7. Energie
8. BMW (Kerkorrel/Daggadirk Uys, Andre le Toit)
9. Ou Ou Lied Van Afrika (Mariaan de Jong)

== Personnel ==
- Johannes Kerkorrel – vocals, keyboards
- Willem "Meneer Volume" Möller – guitar
- Gary "Piet Pers" Herselman – bass
- Jannie "Hanepoot" van Tonder – drums, trombone

Additional musicians

- Antoinette Butler – voice on Sit Dit Af
- Ian Herman – drums
- Louis Tros – synths, acoustic guitar
- Shaun Naidoo – synths
- Warrick Sony – finger cymbals
