= Hermien Dommisse =

South African actress

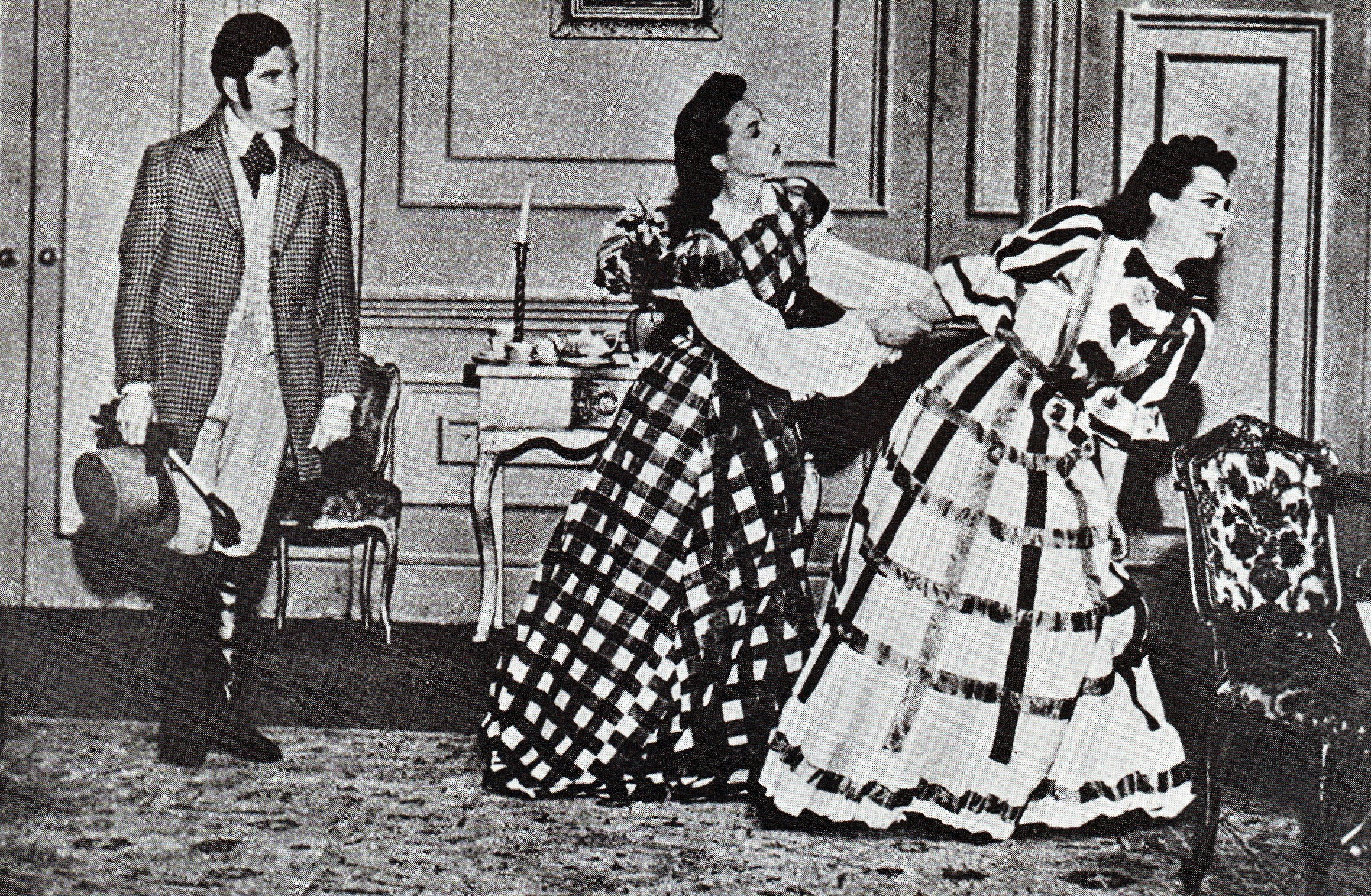
- André Huguenet, Hermien Dommisse and Paula Styger in Helshoogte (in 1943)
- Born: Hermien Anna Dommisse; 27 October 1915; Ermelo
- Died: 24 March 2010 (aged 94); Edenvale, South Africa
- Known for: TV and film
- Spouse: Gilbert McCaul
- Awards: Fleur du Cap Theatre Lifetime Award

Hermien Dommisse (27 October 1915 – 24 March 2010) was a South African actress.

== Early life ==
Dommise was born in Ermelo, Eastern Transvaal, in 1915. She matriculated from Pretoria High School for Girls.She then attended the University of Pretoria and obtained both a BA degree and a Higher Education Diploma. She had a short career as a teacher at Helpmekaar Hoërskool in Johannesburg before returning to the University of Pretoria where she obtained a doctorate in drama.

== Career ==
She made several films in South Africa including Die Kandidaat and Jannie totsiens. She was known for appearing in the long running bi-lingual South African TV soap "Egoli: Place of Gold".

== Marriage ==
In 1941, Dommisse married Gilbert McCaul and had three children, Nina, Jeanne, and Gilbert.

== Death ==
Dommisse died in South Africa at a nursing home.

== Honours ==
In 1987, she was awarded the FAK Award for Outstanding Cultural Achievement. The South African Academy of Science and Arts' awarded Dommisse the Special Medal of Honour for the Advancement of the Performing Arts in 1990. She received a Fleur du Cap Theatre Lifetime Award in 1999.
