= Carel Trichardt =

South African actor

- Born: 4 March 1939 (age 87)
- Occupation: Actor
- Notable work: Diamantendetektiv Dick Donald; Katrina

Carel Trichardt (born 4 March 1939) is a South African actor. He is the previous head of the drama department at the University of Pretoria. He gained fame as the voice behind the children's character, Knersis on the variety programme Wielie Walie. He also appeared in several films, including Katrina, Kruger Millions and Cavaliers games.

== Partial filmography ==
- Cavaliers (1966) - Ben Burgers
- Kruger Millions (1967) - Ben Burgers
- Oupa for Sale (1968) - Auctioneer (uncredited)
- Katrina (1969) - Mr. Brink
- Die Vervlakste Tweeling (1969) - The Sergeant
- Stop Exchange (1970) - Basie
- Pressure Burst (1971) - Dempsey Mans
- Diamantendetektiv Dick Donald (1971, TV Series) - Sam Smiley
- Sononder (1971) - Colonel
- Insident op Paradysstrand (1973)
- Seun van die Wildtemmer (1973) - Kurt Leeman (voice, uncredited)
- The Voortrekkers (1973) - Piet Uys
- Kwikstertjie (1974) - Thys Fourie
- Die Afspraak (1974) - Lieut. Roos
- Härte 10 (1975, TV Mini-Series) - Fred
- 'n Sondag in September (1976) - Henderson
- Les Diamants du président (1977, TV Mini-Series)
- Flatfoot in Africa (1978) - Captain Miller
- Die Eensame Vlug (1979) - Prof. Michal Kellerman
- Pour tout l'or du Transvaal (1979, TV Mini-Series) - Van Druiden
- Rienie (1982) - Len Stevens
- Five Star (1984, TV Series)
- Vyfster: Die Slot (1986) - Col. Human
- Liewe Hemel, Genis! (1986) - Portuguese
- Hellgate (1989) - Lucas Carlyle
- The Fourth Reich (1990) - Meyder Leibbrandt
- Friends (1993) - Rheinhart
- Rhodes (1996, TV Mini-Series) - Paul Kruger
- Oh Schuks ... I'm Gatvol! (2004) - Carel, Boer fighter
- Catch a Fire (2006) - South African minister
- Skin (2008) - the magistrate
- Henley-on-Klip (2010) - Busdrywer
- Traitors (2012) - Judge Jacobs (not yet issued)
- Everyman's Taxi (2012) - Oom Karel
- Uitvlucht (2015) - Joshua (final film role)
- Posbus 1 (2020) - Ben
