= Dwarskersbos =

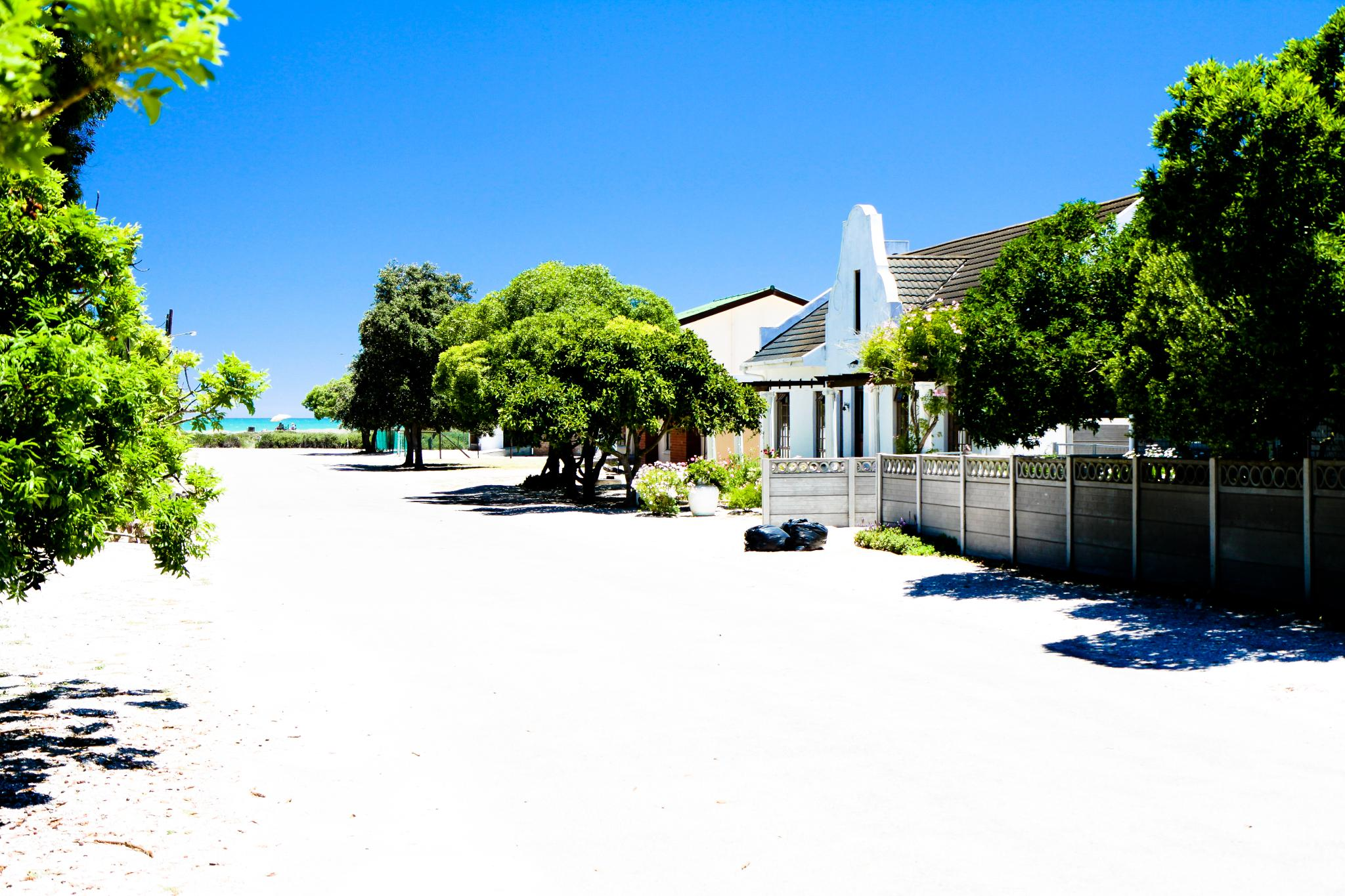
- Beach house in Dwarskersbos

- Location within Western Cape Location within South Africa
- Coordinates: 32°42′S 18°14′E
- Country: South Africa
- Province: Western Cape
- District: West Coast
- Municipality: Bergrivier

Area
  - Total: 1.53 km^{2} (0.59 sq mi)

Population (2011)
  - Total: 670
  - Density: 440/km^{2} (1,100/sq mi)

Racial makeup (2011)
  - Black African: 29.9%
  - Coloured: 9.7%
  - Indian/Asian: 2.7%
  - White: 57.5%
  - Other: 0.1%

First languages (2011)
  - Afrikaans: 94.5%
  - English: 4.5%
  - Other: 1.0%
- Time zone: UTC+2 (SAST)
- Area code: 022
- Website: www.dwarskersbos.com

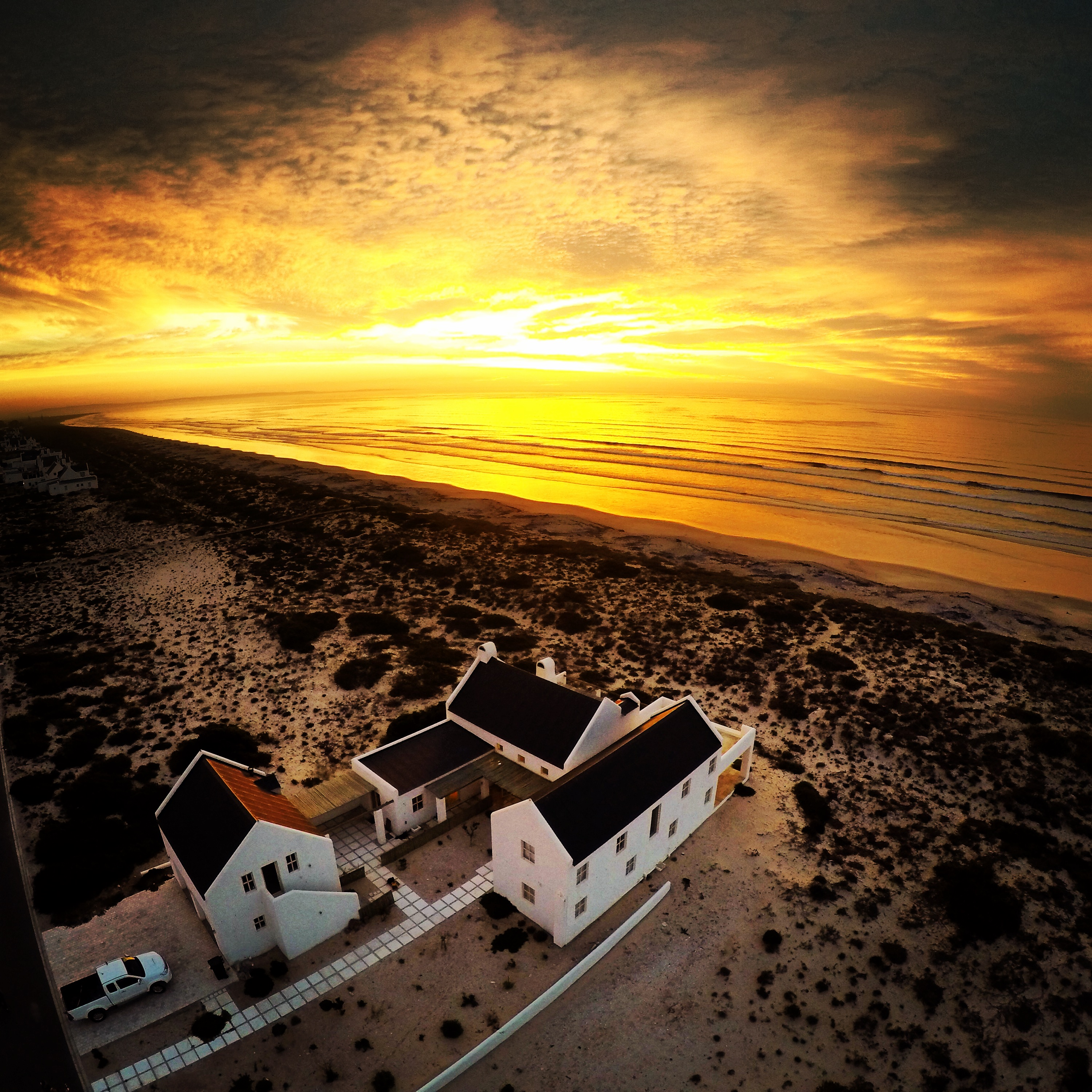
Sunset shot over a beach house in Dwarskersbos.

Dwarskersbos is a fishing village and vacation resort some 11 kilometres (6.8 miles) north of Laaiplek in West Coast District Municipality in the Western Cape province of South Africa.

== Etymology ==
The name is said to be derived from the name of the plant Euclea polyandra of the genus Euclea(Afrikaans: dwarskers or kersbos) which grows abundantly in the region.

== History ==
The Portuguese navigator Vasco da Gama first set foot on South African soil on 7 November 1497 near here when he explored the present St Helena Bay.

The town was established on the farm “Dwarskersbos” that belonged to the Smit family in 1920.

A 6m high storm surge struck Dwarskersbos on 27 August 1969.

== Geography ==
Its beach stretches from Velddrif and Dwarskerbos almost 40 kilometres north towards Elands Bay, making it the longest uninterrupted sandy beach in South Africa.

== Notable people ==
- Hannah Botha (1923-2007), an TV and film actress
