= Emil Nofal =

South African film director (1926–1986)

- Born: 1926; South Africa
- Died: 18 July 1986 (aged 59–60); South Africa
- Occupations: Film director Screenwriter; Film producer
- Years active: 1962–1985

Emil Nofal (1926 – 18 July 1986) was a South African film director, producer and screenwriter.

== Early life and background ==
Nofal was born in Johannesburg in 1926 to parents of Lebanese origin.

== Career ==
Emil entered the film industry at the age of 15 when he began working at Killarney Film Studios, where he remained for approximately 13 years. At Killarney, Nofal worked his way through several technical roles, starting as an assistant editor and film laboratory technician before progressing to cinematography and ultimately to directing feature films. Nofal directed several feature films in the early 1950s, including Song of Africa (1951), a musical comedy notable for showcasing Black performers at a time when opportunities for Black talent in South African cinema were severely limited.

During the late 1950s and early 1960s, Nofal worked with filmmaker Jamie Uys and contributed to the establishment of Uys’ production company before founding his own independent production venture, Emil Nofal Films.

== Selected filmography ==
=== Directing and screenwriting ===
- Song of Africa (1951)
- Rip van Wyk (1959)
- Hou die Blink kant bo (1960)
- Voor sononder (1962)
- Kimberley Jim (1963)
- Wild Season (1967)
- The Winners (1972)
- My Way (1973)
- The Super-Jocks (1980)

Actor

- All the Way to Paris (1965)

=== Scenario ===
- Lord Oom Piet (1962)

=== Screenplays and production ===
- The Candidate (1968)
- Katrina (1969)

=== Production ===
- Unwanted Foreigner (1974)
