= Jans Rautenbach =

South African film director (1936–2016)

- Born: 22 February 1936; Boksburg; South Africa
- Died: 2 November 2016 (aged 80); Mossel Bay, South Africa
- Occupations: Film director Screenwriter; Film producer
- Years active: 1965 – 2014

Jans Rautenbach (22 February 1936 – 2 November 2016) was a South African screenwriter, film producer and director. His 1968 film Die Kandidaat proved controversial and received some censorship in South Africa, because of perceived criticism of the apartheid system. His last film, Abraham, was a hit at the South African box office.

== Selected filmography ==
Director

- Die Kandidaat (1968)
- Katrina (1969)
- Jannie Totsiens (1970)
- Pappalap (1971)
- Ongewenste Vreemdeling (1974)
- Eendag Op 'n Reendag (1976)
- My Way II (1977)
- Blink Stefaans (1981)
- Broer Matie (1984)
- No One Cries Forever (1984)
- Abraham (2015)

== Bibliography ==
- Tomaselli, Keyan. The cinema of apartheid: race and class in South African film. Routledge, 1989.
- Botha, Martin & Steinmair, Deborah. Jans Rautenbach, dromer, baanbreker en auteur/Jans, droomsaaier – sy memoirs (biography & memoirs, in Afrikaans). Genugtig Uitgewers, 2006.
