= Stef Bos =

Dutch singer

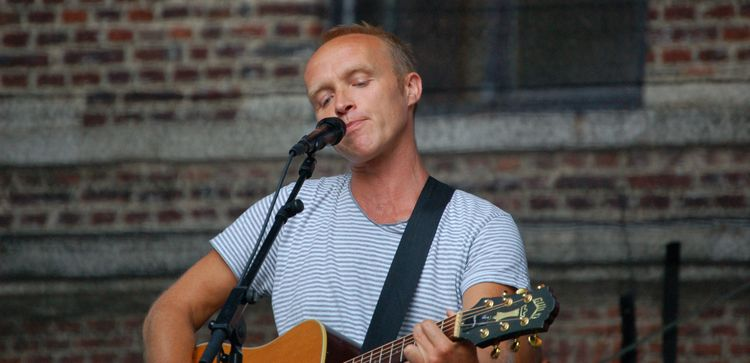
- Stef Bos performing live
- Born: Steven Bos; 12 July 1961 (age 65); Veenendaal, Netherlands
- Years active: 1990–present
- Spouse: Varenka Paschke (married: 2009)
- Children: 1
- Relatives: Neeltje Bos (mother); Bert Bos (father)
- Website: www.stefbos.nl

Steven "Stef" Bos (born 12 July 1961) is a Dutch singer who lives in Cape Town, South Africa. He sings in Dutch, and occasionally in Afrikaans, and has been successful in Belgium, the Netherlands and South Africa since his breakthrough single "Papa" (Daddy) came out in 1990.

Early in his career, Bos worked as a TV actor, playing the character Joop Mengelmoes in the children's TV show Samson en Gert.

He wrote Belgium's entry into the 1989 Eurovision Song Contest, "Door De Wind".

Stef recorded an album (Together as One) in 1993 on which he worked with the South African singers Johannes Kerkorrel and Thandi Klaasen.

== Discography ==
=== Albums ===
- 1990 - Is dit nu later
- 1992 - Tussen de liefde en de leegte
- 1994 - Vuur
- 1995 - Schaduw in de nacht
- 1997 - De onderstroom (2cd)
- 1998 - Stad en land - Live 92/98
- 1999 - Zien
- 2000 - Beste van Bos (South Africa)
- 2000 - Noord & Zuid (Het beste van Stef Bos) (2cd, compilation album)
- 2001 - Van Mpumalanga tot die Kaap
- 2003 - Donker en licht
- 2003 - Donker en licht (2cd, South Africa)
- 2003 - Jy vir my (South Africa)
- 2004 - Donker en licht (2cd, limited edition, 3000 copies)
- 2005 - Ruimtevaarder
- 2005 - Ruimtevaarder (South Africa)
- 2005 - Onvoltooid verleden
- 2007 - Storm (2cd)
- 2008 - Demo's deel 01 2008
- 2008 - Demo's deel 02 2008
- 2008 - Demo's deel 03 2008
- 2009 - In een ander licht
- 2010 - Kloofstraat
- 2010 - Demo's deel 04 2010
- 2010 - Dit is nu later! - 20 jaar Stef Bos (2cd)
- 2010 - Dit is nu later! - 20 jaar Stef Bos (3cd, limited Edition)
- 2011 - Demo's deel 05 2011
- 2011 - Minder Meer
- 2013 - Demo's deel 06 2013
- 2013 - Mooie waanzinnige wereld
- 2015 - Kaalvoet
- 2015 - Een sprong in de tijd
- 2017 - Kern
- 2019 - In Een Ander Licht 2019
- 2019 - Ridder van Toledo
- 2020 - Tijd om te gaan leven
- 2023 - Bitterlief
- 2025 - Kaartenhuis

=== Singles ===
- 1990 - Is dit nu later
- 1990 - Gek Zijn Is Gezond
- 1991 - Laat Vandaag Een Dag Zijn
- 1991 - Papa
- 1991 - Breek De Stilte
- 1991 - Wat een wonder
- 1992 - Jij Bent Voor Mij
- 1993 - De Radio
- 1993 - Awuwa (Zij Wil Dansen)
- 1994 - Vuur/Pepermunt
- 1994 - Pepermunt/Vuur
- 1994 - Hilton Barcelona
- 1995 - Twee Mannen Zo Stil
- 1995 - Vrouwen Aan De Macht
- 1996 - Schaduw In De Nacht
- 1996 - Two Of A Kind
- 1996 - Onder In My Whiskeyglas
- 1997 - De Dag Zal Komen
- 1997 - De Tovenaar
- 1999 - Papa (live)
- 1999 - Ik Geloof In Jou
- 1999 - Niets Te Verliezen
- 2000 - Ginette
- 2000 - Kind Van de Vijand
- 2000 - Suikerbossie
- 2003 - Ik Mis Jou
- 2003 - Engjelushe
- 2004 - Zij Weet
- 2005 - Ruimtevaarder
- 2009 - In een ander licht
- 2010 - Kloofstraat
