= Cinema of Zimbabwe =

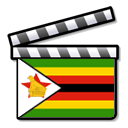
- No. of screens: 13 (2021)
  - Per capita: 0.07 per 100,000 (2021)

Zimbabwe has an active film culture that includes films made in Zimbabwe during its pre- and post-colonial periods. The country hosts the Zimbabwe International Film Festival as well as the International Images Film Festival for Women (IIFF). As of 2021, it is estimated around 20 local feature films are made annually.

Economic crisis and political crisis have been features of the industry. UNESCO described the industry as facing persistent challenges with funding, distribution and monetisation, as well as being constrained by a lack of technical skills. A publication from the 1980s counted 14 cinemas in Zimbabwe's capital city, Harare, while a 2021 report counted only 4 cinema's accounting for 13 cinematic screen in the entire country. According to a 1998 report, only 15 percent of the population had been to a cinema. European and American films have been made on location in Zimbabwe as well as Indian films. American films are popular in Zimbabwe but face restrictions limiting their distribution.

== Cinematic history ==
Great Britain's Colonial Film Unit was active in Zimbabwe. Zimbabwe's post-colonial government has worked to sponsor film development, but changed this strategy after financial losses. Germany helped fund a film training and production program. In the 1980s, the Zimbabwean government launched a campaign to attract foreign productions to film on location. Examples of films made around this time include King Solomon's Mines (1985), an American movie filmed outside Harare, and Cry Freedom (1987), a British-American film.

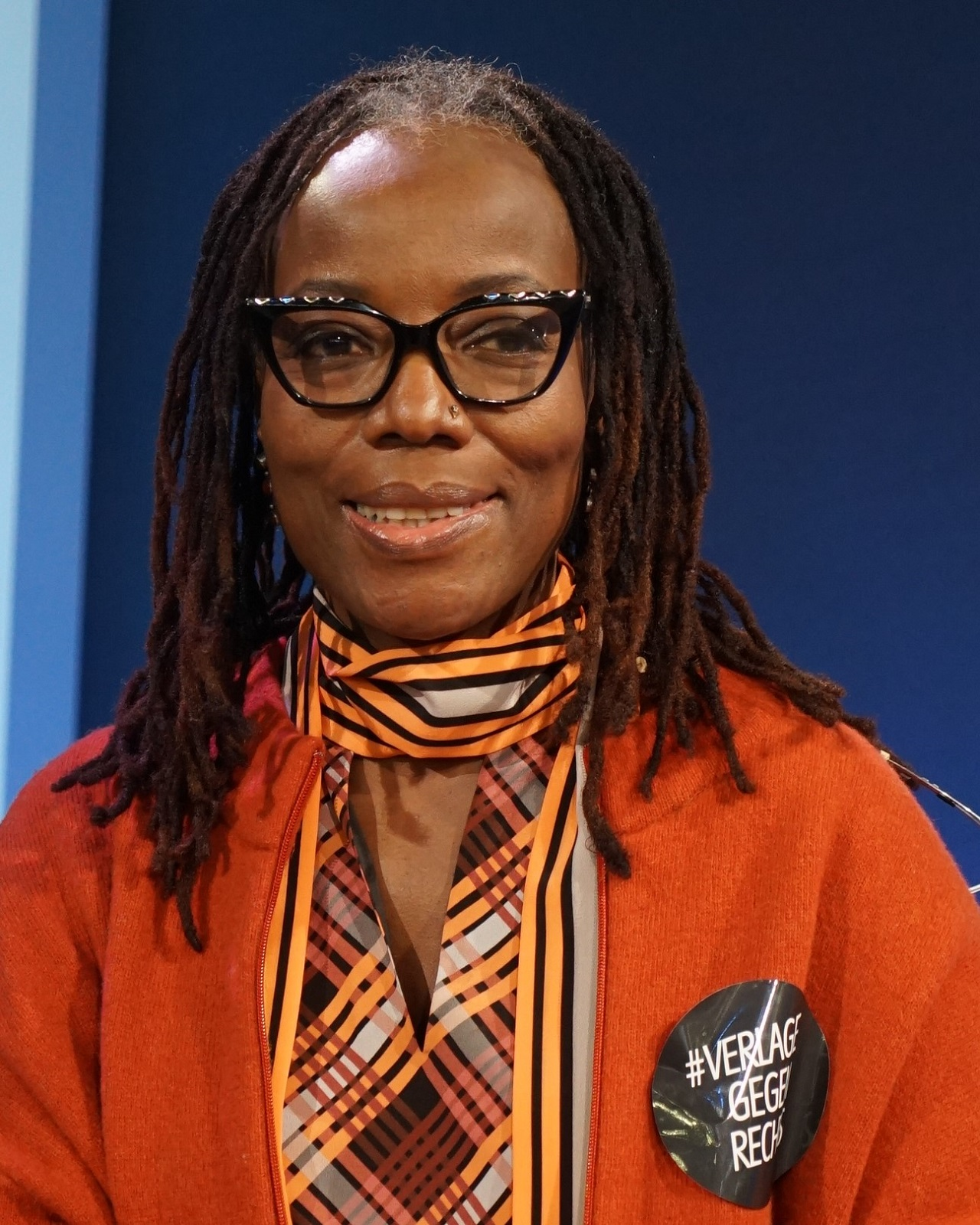
Tsitsi Dangarembga, Zimbabwean film director and founder of the International Images Film Festival for Women

In the 1990s, the American non-profit company Media for Development International played a major role in funding films until its departure in 2000. Films made in this era as described as high quality, message-driven films. One film made in the era was Neria (1991), which has been described as "the film Zimbabwean fim to receive international acclaim." Another is the romantic comedyYellow Card (2000). In 1998, Zimbabwe International Film Festival was founded. In 2002, the International Images Film Festival for Women (IIFF) was founded by Zimbabwean filmmaker Tsitsi Dangarembga.

At the start of the 21st century, Nollywood films made their entrance into Zimbabwe and gained popularity, inspiring a new segment of Zimbabwe's film industry dubbed Zollywood. This new generation of filmmakers, including Joe Njagu, started producing high yields of low-budget films. These films are characterised as tackling a wide variety of subjects and genres and generally having a contained local impact Examples include drama films Something Nice from London (2015) and Kushata Kwemoyo (2018). In 2014, the Zimbabwe Film Industry Development Platform (ZFIDP) was founded, which is a membership based structure organised by film practitioners. Since formation, Antony Mutambiri, Nyaradzo Muchena and Shem Zemura have served as Chairpersons.

The 2017 romantic comedy Cook Off won several awards at the Zimbabwe International Film Festival as well as National Arts Merit Awards and had several screenings at international film festivals. It was consequently picked up by Netflix in 2020, becoming the first Zimbabwean film to do so.

== Notable figures ==
Zimbabwean directors include Tsitsi Dangarembga, Rumbi Katedza, Roger Hawkins, Godwin Mawuru, Michael Raeburn, Farai Sevenzo, Ingrid Sinclair, Sydney Taivavashe, Shem Zemura and Edwina Spicer.

Zimbabwean actors include Munya Chidzonga, Tongayi Chirisa, Adam Croasdell, John Indi, Dominic Kanaventi, Edgar Langeveldt, Tawanda Manyimo, l Cont Mhlanga and Lucian Msamati. Zimbabwean actresses include Chipo Chung, Carole Gray, Kubi Indi, and Sibongile Mlambo.

Keith Shiri is a Zimbabwean film curator.

== Notable films ==
Films from Rhodesia:

- Shangani Patrol (1968), a war film about the Shangani Patrol
- Albino (1976), a German thriller

Films filmed in and from Zimbabwe include:

- King Solomon's Mines (1985), an American action adventure film shot in Zimbabwe
- Kizhakku Africavil Sheela (1987), a Tamil language film largely shot in Zimbabwe
- A World Apart (1988), an anti-apartheid drama film
- Jit (1990), a romantic comedy
- White Hunter Black Heart (1990), an American film shot in Zimbabwe
- Neria (1991)
- Everyone's Child (1995)
- Flame (1996), set during the Rhodesian Bush War
- Forbidden Fruit (2000), a German-Zimbabwean film about a lesbian relation
- Lumumba (2000), a French language film about Patrice Lumumba filmed in Zimbabwe
- The Legend of the Sky Kingdom (2003), an animated film
- Tanyaradzwa (2005)
- Mugabe and the White African (2009), a documentary
- iThemba (2010), a documentary about the Zimbabwean band Liyana
- Sores of Emmanuel (2010), a film about a single father's hope, written and directed by Eddie Ndhlovu
- Something Nice from London (2013), a Zimbabwean British drama film
- Democrats (2014), a Danish documentary about politics in Zimbabwe
- Cook Off (2017), the first Zimbabwean film picked up by Netflix
- Thandie's Diary (2018), a film about gender based violence against women written and directed by Eddie Ndhlovu
- Kushata Kwemoyo (2018), a drama film
- Gonarezhou (2019), an anti-poaching film
- Nyanga (2024), a film about pride, inspired by a ranger who defended his cause against poachers

== See also ==
- Cinema of Africa
- List of Zimbabwean films
