= Mayfair (disambiguation) =

Mayfair is an area in the City of Westminster in London, England.

Mayfair may also refer to:

== Arts and entertainment ==
=== Fictional characters ===
- Katherine Mayfair, in TV series Desperate Housewives
  - Adam Mayfair, Katherine's second husband
  - Dylan Mayfair, Katherine's daughter
- Monk Mayfair, a Doc Savage character
- a family of witches, in the novel series Lives of the Mayfair Witches by Anne Rice

=== Other uses in arts and entertainment ===
- Mayfair Festival of the Arts, an annual festival in Allentown, Pennsylvania
- Mayfair (film), a 2018 South African action drama
- Mayfair (magazine), a British adult magazine for men
- "Mayfair", a song by Nick Drake from the 1987 album Time of No Reply
- Mayfair Pictures, an American film production and distribution company 1931–1934

== Businesses, organisations and brands ==
=== Businesses ===
- Mayfair Bank, now CIB Kenya, a commercial bank in Kenya
- Mayfair Carriage Co, a former British coachbuilder and car dealer
- Mayfair Games, an American publisher of board and roleplaying games
- Mayfair Markets, now Gelson's Markets, a California, U.S. supermarket chain
- Mayfair Mall, in Wauwatosa, Wisconsin, U.S.
- Mayfair Shopping Centre, in Victoria, British Columbia, Canada
- Mayfair Studios, a recording studio in London 1960s–2008
- Mayfair Tankers, a merchant shipping company
- Mayfair, a mall in the Coconut Grove neighborhood of Miami, Florida

=== Entertainment venues ===
- Mayfair Ballroom, a former venue in Newcastle upon Tyne, England
- Mayfair Club, a defunct cardroom in New York City, U.S.
- Mayfair Hotel (disambiguation)
- Mayfair Music Hall, Santa Monica, California, demolished in 2010
- Mayfair Theatre (disambiguation)
- The Garage, Glasgow, formerly known as The Mayfair

=== Schools ===
- Mayfair Academy of Fine Arts, a dance school in Chicago, Illinois, U.S.
- Mayfair High School, in Lakewood, California, U.S.
- Truman College, formerly Mayfair College, Chicago, U.S.

== People ==
- Billy Mayfair (born 1966), American professional golfer
- Mitzi Mayfair (1914–1976), American dancer and actress born Emylyn Pique
- Mayfair Yang (fl. from 1986), a Taiwanese-American cultural anthropologist

== Places ==
=== Canada ===
- Mayfair, Calgary, Alberta
- Mayfair, Saskatchewan
- Mayfair, Saskatoon, Saskatchewan
- Mayfair, Southwest Middlesex, Ontario

=== United States ===
- Mayfair, California (disambiguation)
- Mayfair, Philadelphia, Pennsylvania
- Mayfair (Washington, D.C.), a neighborhood
- Mayfair, a neighborhood in Albany Park, Chicago, Illinois
- Mayfair (Jenkinsville, South Carolina), a historic home

=== Elsewhere ===
- Mayfair, Johannesburg
- Mayfair, New Zealand

== Sports ==
- Mayfair Open, a 1959 LPGA golf tournament
- Mayfair Sporting Club, London, an organiser of boxing dinner events

== Transportation ==
- Dodge Mayfair, a 1953–1959 automobile
- Packard Mayfair, a 1951–1953 automobile
- Mayfair station, a commuter rail station in Chicago, Illinois

== Other uses ==
- Mayfair (cigarette), a cigarette brand
- Mayfair salad dressing

== See also ==
- Mayfair House, Philadelphia, Pennsylvania, U.S., an apartment building
- Mayfair Apartments
- Mayfair Pumping Station, Chicago, U.S.
