= Cook Off =

2017 Zimbabwean romantic comedy film by Tomas Brickhill

- Film poster
- Directed by: Tomas Brickhill
- Written by: Tomas Brickhill
- Produced by: Joe Njagu; Zoe Flood
- Starring: Tendaiishe Chitima; Fungai Majaya; Tehn Diamond
- Cinematography: Sébastien Lallemand
- Music by: Ryan Koriya
- Production company: Mufambanidzo Film Company
- Distributed by: Mufambanidzo Film Company; Netflix
- Release date: 31 December 2017
- Running time: 101 minutes
- Country: Zimbabwe
- Language: English

Cook Off is a 2017 Zimbabwean romantic comedy film written and directed by Tomas Brickhill. Set in contemporary middle class society of Harare, the film stars Tendaiishe Chitima, Fungai Majaya and Tehn Diamond. Production of the film was delayed by power failures, budget constraints, anti-government protests, and riots which erupted during the final stages of the Presidency of Robert Mugabe. It is the first film released after the Zimbabwe Mugabe era, which lasted for nearly 40 years. The film also became the first Zimbabwean film to be streamed on Netflix. It is the second Zimbabwean film to reach Western audiences and critics since Neria, in 1991. The film received critical acclaim in Zimbabwe, with some drawing comparisons to the cultural influence of Neria and Yellow Card. The film is credited by journalists domestically as a milestone in the Zimbabwean film industry, which has been troubled by economic crisis and hyperinflation.

== Synopsis ==
When single mother Anesu (Tendaiishe Chitima) is secretly entered into a reality television cooking competition by her son, she must overcome the disapproval of her mother and the rivalry of professional chefs. She also finds love during the competition.

== Cast ==
- Tendaiishe Chitima as Anesu
- Fungai Majaya as Milly Ann
- Tehn Diamond as Prince
- Tomas Brickhill as JJ
- Jesese Mungoshi as Anesu's grandmother
- Shingai Shoniwa (cameo appearance)
- Sylent Nqo

== Production ==
The principal photography of the film commenced in 2017 when Robert Mugabe was still the president of Zimbabwe. The initial days of the shooting procedure of the film was disrupted by regular power cuts and the production team was forced to hire power generator for the shooting. The film budget was limited to only food and bottled water for the cast and crew members. The daily budget limit was estimated around $20 equivalent to €18 which was insufficient to meet the expenditure on bottled mineral water. The film cast and crew consisted mostly of young artistes and film producer Njagu reportedly made deferred contracts with the cast and crew members instead of making an agreement for an immediate payment due to financial tussles. According to the lead actress of the film Chitima, none of the cast members had not received the payment for their work and efforts in the film. By December 2020 all cast and crew had received payment in full. The film was completed with a low initial budget of only $8000.

The portions of the film were predominantly shot on the sets of ZBC TV's reality show Battle of the Chefs: Harare, a Zimbabwean version of the popular American reality television show Top Chef. The film shooting proceeded in the sets of the Battle of the Chefs at a time when the show went off-air. The film director Brickhill in an interview with The Guardian revealed that the film wouldn't have materialized without the support of Battle of the Chefs sets and financial support from voluntary donors. The cast members also used the costumes, props and cooking pots from the sets of the Battle of the Chefs.

Popular UK indie rock band Noisettes was roped into feature in the soundtrack of the film. Shingai Shoniwa of the Noisettes band was also roped into play the cameo appearance in the film. The shooting was also delayed on few occasions as few of the cast members were unable to commit to the schedule allocated to them due to the tear gas and riots in Harare which erupted against Robert Mugabe's administration. Despite the odds and obstacles, the film production regained momentum after the infamous successful ousting of Robert Mugabe on 17 November 2017.

== Release and reception ==
The film had its debut release in a homemade cinema at the rooftop of the New Ambassador Hotel in Harare on 31 December 2017 and was later released at the Reps Theatre. Soon after its theatrical release, the film was screened at various international film festivals held in South Africa, Netherlands, US, Botswana, Kenya, Swaziland, Belgium and New Zealand. The film was officially selected for premiere at the Nairobi Film Festival (June 2019), Cambria Film Festival, Rotterdam International Film Festival (January 2020), Seattle International Film Festival (May–June 2018), Afrika Film Festival (May 2019), Bushfire Festival (May 2019), Auckland New Zealand African Film Festival (February 2019), Zimbabwe International Film Festival, Pan African Film Festival, Silicon Valley African Film Festival (July 2018), Cannes Festival International du Film Pan-Africain (April 2019) and at the Durban International Film Festival (July 2018). It also became the first Zimbabwean film in 22 years after Neria to have officially selected at the Rotterdam International Film Festival. The film was opened to generally mixed reviews from critics. The film had its London premiere at the Mayfair Hotel on 27 July 2019 and also featured in BBC World Service.

It was reported that the American streaming platform Netflix during mid March 2020 sealed a deal with the filmmakers in order to obtain the streaming rights of the film for an undisclosed record price. The director also refused to disclose the amount regarding the Netflix deal. In May 2020, the filmmakers confirmed that the film would be released in Netflix platform in an official announcement in Twitter. It also marked the first instance where Netflix acquired a Zimbabwean film. The film made its debut in Netflix on 1 June 2020 after two and a half years since its theatrical release in Zimbabwe. It also became Zimbabwe's first feature film to be released via Netflix. The film was deemed as relatively unknown by most of the Zimbabwean people until its release in Netflix.

The television rights of the film was bought by the state channel ZBC Television and the film made its television debut on 11 August 2020.

== Awards and nominations ==
The film received few awards and nominations at film festivals. It bagged a total of four awards at the film festivals, including two each at the 2020 Cambria Film Festival. and Zimbabwe International Film Festival. The film also received two National Arts Merit Awards presented by the National Arts Council of Zimbabwe in 2019.

Year	Award	Category	Result
2018	Zimbabwe International Film Festival	Best Feature	Won
2018	Zimbabwe International Film Festival	Best Actress	Won
2019	National Arts Merit Awards	Best Actress	Won
2019	National Arts Merit Awards	Best Feature	Won
2020	Cambria Film Festival	Nancy Green Founder's Award - Best Film	Won
2020	Cambria Film Festival	Audience Award - Best Feature	Won
	Afrika Film Festival	Student Jury Award	Nominated
	Ambrosia Film Festival	Best Film	Nominated

== See also ==
- Tanyaradzwa
- List of Zimbabwean films
