= Tomas Brickhill =

Zimbabwean filmmaker

- Born: Tomas Lutuli Brickhill; 25 March 1978 (age 48); London, England
- Education: Prince Edward High School
- Alma mater: Surrey Institute of Art & Design, University College
- Occupations: Filmmaker, writer, musician
- Years active: 1986–present
- Father: Paul Brickhill

Tomas Lutuli Brickhill (born 25 March 1978) is a filmmaker, writer, and musician in Zimbabwe. He directed the critically acclaimed 2017 film Cook Off.

== Personal life ==
He was born on 25 March 1978 in London, England. His father, Paul Brickhill was a former Zimbabwe People's Revolutionary Army (ZIPRA) soldier and war vet. Therefore, he was in exile in the UK at the time of Tomas's birth. However, soon after the Zimbabwean independence, the family returned to Zimbabwe. After returning, his father ran the influential arts and culture space called 'The Book Café'. After his father died in 2014, Tomas started running the Café. He has three brothers: Liam, Amy and Declan. He studied at Prince Edward High School, Harare from 1991 to 1996.

== Career ==
He left Zimbabwe in 1997 to move to United Kingdom and attended to Surrey Institute of Art & Design, University College in 1999. He studied Film and later worked in various roles trying to gain a wide range of technical experience in Surrey and graduated with Bachelor of Arts (BA) in Cinematography and Film/Video Production in 2001. Then he taught film courses for Raindance Film Festival, BBC and VMI for few years.

Tomas returned to Zimbabwe in 2010, and in 2013 completed his first feature as a cinematographer, Dust & Fortunes. Then in 2017, he was selected as the director of television serial Battle of the Chefs season 3. Meanwhile, he taught film courses for Zimbabwe talents at Global Academy in Zimbabwe where he later became the Head of the Film Department for two years. Then he taught a short film course at the University of Zimbabwe before moving into Eswatini with filmmaking workshops.

Later in 2017, he made his debut cinema direction Cook Off. The film received critical acclaim and won many awards at local and international film festivals. It had a sold out International Premier at International Film Festival Rotterdam (IFFR) and became the first feature from Zimbabwe to be part of the Official Selection for 22 years. The film won the awards for the Best Film and Best Actress at the 2019 National Arts Merit Awards (NAMA) and Zimbabwe International Film Festival (ZIFF) in 2018. In the film, Tomas also starred in a minor role called 'JJ'. In June 2020 it became the first Zimbabwean film to be screened on Netflix, providing international media attention. It is only the second Zimbabwean film to receive international attention after Neria. The film is hailed as one of the finest ever films in the Cinema of Zimbabwe after Neria and Yellow Card and opened to extremely positive response from Zimbabweans. The film is credited with shattering stereotypes of the Zimbabwean film industry which had been crippled by economic crisis and hyperinflation in the country.

He also owned the Paw Paw Jam Productions, a production company specialized with African music events and filming in UK. Apart from cinema, he is also a musician accompanied with the band 'Chikwata'.

== Filmography ==
| Year | Film | Role | Genre | Ref. |
|---|---|---|---|---|
| 2017 | Cook Off | Director, producer, Actor: JJ | Film | |
