= Tehn Diamond =

Zimbabwean rapper (born 1985)

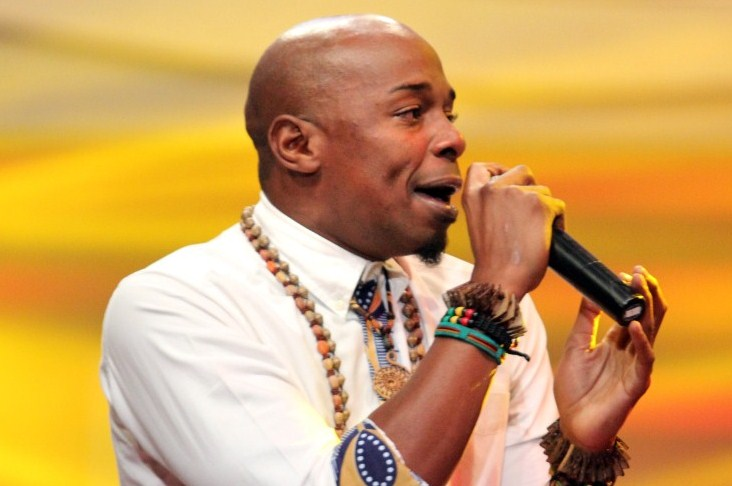
- Tehn Diamond performing at the Big Brother Africa finals in 2013

Background information
- Birth name: Tendai Ryan Nguni
- Born: 17 January 1985 (age 40)
- Origin: Harare, Zimbabwe
- Genres: Hip hop
- Occupations: Rapper; Singer; Songwriter; Actor; Record producer
- Years active: 2006–present
- Labels: Independent
- Spouse: Miss Chindiya

Tendai Ryan Nguni (born 17 January 1985), known professionally as Tehn Diamond or Tehn, is a Zimbabwean rapper and a singer-songwriter. He is a member of the hip-hop collective Few Kings, known for their collaborative album releases. Tehn Diamond also appeared in the Zimbabwean feature film Cook Off, which became the first Zimbabwean film to be released on Netflix.

== Early life ==
Tehn Diamond was born in 1985 to Sylvester Nguni, a Zimbabwean politician. He grew up in the gated community of Borrowdale Brooke in Harare, Zimbabwe, and attended St George's College. Initially pursuing a finance degree in Brisbane, Australia, he eventually shifted his focus to a music career.

In 2008, the Australian government revoked the student visas of several children of senior members of former Zimbabwean President Robert Mugabe's administration, including Diamond, as part of broader sanctions. This led to his relocation to Singapore, before returning to Zimbabwe.

== Musical career ==
=== Early years ===
Diamond released his first mixtape, Student of the Game: Higher Learning, in 2008, followed by Student of the Game: Boys Will Be Boys in 2010. In 2012, he received the Best Video award at the National Arts Merit Awards for “Happy.”

=== 2012–present ===
In December 2014, Diamond embarked on a national tour in Zimbabwe, culminating in a performance in Bulawayo. The event was hosted by Vault Cosmetics. Throughout his career, he has collaborated with various Zimbabwean artists, including The Djembe Monks, and performed on the reality TV show Big Brother Africa.

Diamond's song "Happy," featuring fellow artist Jnr Brown, was played on major Zimbabwean stations like Star FM and Power FM, and was nominated for Best Song of the Year at the Zim Hip Hop Awards. On Valentine's Day 2015, he opened for South African rapper Cassper Nyovest in Harare.

On 1 January 2017, Tehn Diamond released his album, A Few Good Poems. Later that year, he collaborated with Jnr Brown and Take Fizzo to release the album -The Feeling Ain't Fair 2 (#TFAF2), the sequel to his earlier mixtape.

== Awards ==
=== National Arts Merit Awards ===
Tehn Diamond won a NAMA (National Arts Merit Awards) in 2012 for Best Video ("Happy" featuring Jnr Brown).

Year	Nominee / work	Award	Result
2010	Student of the Game: Higher Learning	Best Hip Hop Artist	Won
2010	Student of the Game: Higher Learning	Best Hip Hop Album	Won
2012	Student of the Game: Boys Will Be Boys	Best Video	Won

== Discography ==
=== Compilation albums ===
List of albums, with selected details
Title	Album details
The Feeling Ain't Fair (with Few Kings)	Released: 23 October 2013; Label: KYN Records, Nothing Short of Amazing, Big Boy Business, Zion; Format: CD, digital download

=== Singles ===
List of singles, showing year released and album name
Title	Year	Album
"Happy" (featuring Jnr Brown)	2013	The Feeling Ain't Fair
"Grown Up Kid"	2012	Student of the Game: Pursuit of Amazing
"Simudza Gumbo" (featuring Dadza D)	2014	The Perfect Tehn
