= Mind Games (2017 film) =

Award winning Zimbabwean film

Mind Games is a Zimbabwean feature film written and directed by Charles Mawungwa and produced by Thandiwe N. Mawungwa. It was awarded Best Zimbabwean film at the Zimbabwe International Film Festival in 2017, Best Narrative Feature at Calcutta International Film Festival 2017 and Best Editing at the Five Continents Film Festival in 2018. The film stars Kevin Hanssen and Dax Jackson.
