= Tamy Moyo =

Zimbabwean musical artist and actress (born 1998)

- Born: Thamsanqa Moyo; 5 January 1998 (age 28); Harare, Zimbabwe
- Occupations: Actress, singer
- Instruments: Vocals, guitar
- Years active: 2008–present

Thamsanqa 'Tamy' Moyo (born 5 January 1998) is a Zimbabwean musical artist and actress. She rose to fame after releasing her 2016 song “Ndibereke" she is also known for her role in the 2020 film “Gonarezhou".

== Early life ==
She was born on 5 January 1998 in Harare, Zimbabwe. Her father Richard Kohola is a presenter at Star FM Zimbabwe popularly known as RK. She was raised by her mother Doris Moyo and her grandfather Makwara.

== Career ==
At the age of 7, she started singing particularly in the senior choir. She completed primary education from Lusitania Primary School and later attended Westridge High School for secondary education. At an age of 13 while she was in Form One, she joined with popular artists Joe Thomas, Oliver Mtukudzi, Stunner, Ba Shupi, and Alexio Kawara. Later she became the Child Ambassador for Childline Zimbabwe, becoming the youngest Zimbabwean ever to be an ambassador. In 2008, Tamy formed the Uganda African Choir, together with three other colleagues in a charity gig at the Madison Square Garden in New York.

She wrote and sang a song, Cry For Help which encourages fellow children to call freephone 116 for help. In 2012, Tamy released her first music album Celebrate Yo Lyf. Then she got the opportunity to perform in biggest Zimbabwean festivals such as Harare International Festival of the Arts and Shoko Festival. She also featured at the National Arts Merit Awards and Miss Tourism Zimbabwe where she performed in November 2016.

In 2017, Tamy was invited to play in the film Gonarezhou by the co-producer of the film, Sydney Taivavashe. The film is produced in conjunction with the Zimbabwe Parks and Wildlife Management Authority. In the film Tamy played the role of 'Chipo' as her debut cinema appearance. In the same year, she had her first nomination in the National Arts Merit Awards (NAMA awards) for the excellence in her role.

In 2019, Tamy was nominated for the best female artiste from Southern Africa at All Africa Music Award (AFRIMA) ceremony in Ghana.

In mid 2021, she was appointed as brand ambassador by ZIMOCO an official distributor of Mercedes Benz.

In November 2021, she released a thirteen track album called Bvudzijena at a ZIMOCO live session and her act was equated to an award level performance by Black Entertainment Television (BET).

She was nominated for the best female artiste in Southern Africa under the prestigious All Africa Music Awards 2021 (AFRIMA). She ran the battle alongside, Makhadzi (who bagged the award), Sha Sha amongst others. In 2025, she won the Best Female Artist of the year at the 23rd edition of the National Arts Merit Awards.

== Filmography ==
Year	Film	Role	Genre	Ref.
2020	Gonarezhou	Chipo	Film	
