= Munya =

Munya may refer to:

- Munya language, a language spoken in China
- Munya, Ghana, a community in Tolon District in the Northern Region
- Munya, Nigeria

== People ==
- Munya Chidzonga (born 1986), Zimbabwean actor, filmmaker and entrepreneur
- Munya Chawawa (born 1992), British-Zimbabwean actor and comedian

== See also ==
- Munyaradzi
