= Tariro Mnangagwa =

Zimbabwean actress

- Born: 1986 (age 39–40); Harare, Zimbabwe
- Education: Cape Peninsula University of Technology
- Occupations: Filmmaker, actress
- Years active: 2018–present
- Father: Emmerson Mnangagwa

Tariro Mnangagwa (born 1986) is a Zimbabwean film producer, actress and conservationist. She is known for her role in the 2020 film Gonarezhou: The Movie. Her producing credits include Gonarezhou: The Movie (2020) and The Story of Nehanda (2021), both of which she starred in. She is the youngest daughter of current Zimbabwean president Emmerson Mnangagwa and his first wife Jayne Matarise.

== Early life ==
Mnangagwa was born in Harare to President Emmerson Mnangagwa and Jayne Matarise, who died on 31 January 2002 of cervical cancer. Mnangagwa has five older siblings: Farai, Tasiwa, Vimbayi, Tapiwa, and Emmerson Tanaka. She also has three half-siblings from her father's second marriage. Mnangagwa obtained a Diploma in Professional Photography at Cape Town's CityVarsity. She also graduated with an Honours in Sport Management at the Cape Peninsula University of Technology.

== Career ==
After returning to Zimbabwe, Mnangagwa joined with Akashinga, an all-female anti-poaching ranger unit. Then she became a member an all-female anti-poaching combat unit called the International Anti-Poaching Foundation.

Soon after that, she was invited to play in the film Gonarezhou by the co-producer of the film, Sydney Taivavashe. The film is produced in conjunction with the Zimbabwe Parks and Wildlife Management Authority. In the film Mnangagwa played the role 'Sergeant Onai' as well as produced the film.

== Filmography ==
Year	Film	Role	Genre	Ref.
2020	Gonarezhou	Sergeant Onai	Film	
2021	The Story of Nehanda	Jane Shonhiwa	Film	
