= John Riber =

Indian filmmaker

- Born: John Riber; India
- Occupations: Director, Producer, Film lab technician, Cameraman, Editor, Scriptwriter, Producer
- Years active: 1979–present
- Spouse: Louise Riber

John Riber is an Indian-born Zimbabwean filmmaker and producer. He is best known for directing the 2000 Zimbabwean comedy drama Yellow Card.

== Career ==
He was born and raised in India. In 1977, he completed university film studies in the United States. John along with his wife Louise Riber started making films in the development arena since 1979, particularly in Bangladesh and in India. Then in 1987, they moved to Zimbabwe and established Media for Development Trust (MFD), one of Africa's leading production and distribution houses. The first film directed by John and Louise after moving to Zimbabwe is Consequences. The film won numerous festival awards and became a commercial hit. In 2000, he directed the comedy drama film Yellow Card starring Leroy Gopal and Kasamba Mkumba. The film received mixed reviews from critics and later screened at several film festivals such as Carthage Film Festival, Zanzibar International Film Festival, Southern African Film Festival in October and at Panafrican Film and Television Festival of Ouagadougou (Fespaco).

With that success, the duo made many popular Zimbabwean feature films such as Neria, More Time and Everyone's Child. The theme of most of the films and soap operas are based on reproductive health issues in Africa.

== Filmography ==
Year	Film	Role	Genre	Ref.
1991	Neria	Producer, Cinematographer, Script editor	Film	
1993	More Time	Producer, writer	Film	
1996	Everyone's Child	Producer, writer	Film	
2000	Yellow Card	Director, writer, Producer	Film	
2002	Shanda	Director	Film	
2009	Mwamba Ngoma	Producer	Documentary	
2011	Chumo	Producer, writer	Short film	
2012	Siri ya Mtungi	Producer	TV series	
2014	Mdundiko	Producer	Film	
2015	Dar Noir	Producer	Film	
2017	Tunu: The Gift	Executive producer	Film	
2018	Fatuma	Producer	Film	
2018	Bahasha	Producer	Film	
