= Tendai Musoni =

Zimbabwean actress

- Died: 2017
- Occupation: actress
- Notable work: Tanyaradzwa
- Spouse: Anopa Makaka
- Children: 2
- Awards: Best Upcoming Actress at the 2006 Africa Movie Academy Awards

Tendai Musoni is a Zimbabwean actress.

== Life ==
Tendai Musoni's first acting job was on a 2003-2004 Zimbabwe radio drama, Mopani Junction, for which she won the Merit Award for Best Supporting Actress. Her performance in Tanyaradzwa (2005) won her the Best Upcoming Actress at the 2006 Africa Movie Academy Awards. She has also acted in live theatre, appearing in Intimate Affairs, a play by Stephen Chifunyise and Alone But Together, directed by Walter Muparutsa.

Musoni married comedian and film director Anopa Makaka, and lives in London with their two children. Makaka died unexpectedly in 2017.

== Filmography ==
- Tanyaradzwa, dir. Tawanda Gunda Mupengo, 2005
- Playing Warriors, dir. Rumbi Katedza
