= Kevin Hanssen =

Zimbabwean actor

- Born: Kevin Hanssen; Harare, Zimbabwe
- Occupations: Actor, musician, writer
- Years active: 1985–present
- Height: 1.72 m (5 ft 8 in)
- Website: https://kevinhanssen.com

Kevin Hanssen, is a Zimbabwean actor, author and musician. He is best known for the roles in the films Mind Games, Mugabe and The Telling Room.

== Education and Career ==
In 1994, he obtained Bachelor of Arts degree in Industrial Psychology from UNISA, South Africa. He is also a founding member of Over the Edge Theatre Company. He acted in the stage play 'A Man Like You' which was staged in many Zimbabwean theaters.

== Awards ==
He has won several awards at many international festivals.

- BAT Best Supporting Actor – I’m Not Rappaport (1993)
- Pick of the Fringe Award, Edinburgh Festival – Twelfth Night (2001)
- Spirit of the Fringe Award, Edinburgh Festival – Born African (2003)
- BAT Best Actor Award – Miss Julie (2010)
- AFDIS Best Actor Award – An Inspector Calls (2015)
- Best Actor Award, Zimbabwe International Film Festival – Mind Games (2017)
- AFDIS Best Actor Award – My Fair Lady (2017)

== Filmography ==
Year	Film	Role	Genre	Ref.
1993	I’m Not Rappaport		Film	
2001	Twelfth Night			
2003	Born African			
2010	Miss Julie			
2013	Freestate	Jaap	Short film	
2015	An Inspector Calls			
2017	Jabu's Jungle	Cheetah	TV series	
2017	Mind Games	Ex	Film	
2017	Cook Off	Judge	Film	
2017	Mugabe	Prison Supervisor	Film	
2017	My Fair Lady		Film	
2020	The Telling Room	Walter Parks	Film	
