= Munyaradzi =

Munyaradzi is a common name in Zimbabwe which means "comforter" in the Shona language. The name can also be shortened to Munya.

Notable persons with that name include:

- Munyaradzi Chidzonga (born 1986), Zimbabwean actor, filmmaker and entrepreneur.
- Munyaradzi Gwisai, Zimbabwean politician
- Henry Munyaradzi (1913–1998), Zimbabwean sculptor

== See also ==
- Munya (disambiguation)
