= Rise (2025 film) =

2025 Zimbabwean short film

- Directed by: Jessica J. Rowlands
- Written by: Jessica J. Rowlands
- Produced by: Joe Njagu; Jessica J. Rowlands; Zoe Flood
- Starring: Tongayi Chirisa; Sikhanyiso Ngwenya
- Cinematography: Jacques Naudé
- Edited by: Roman Kuznets; Paul Watts
- Music by: Max Uldahl
- Release date: June 8, 2025 (Tribeca)
- Running time: 22 minutes
- Country: Zimbabwe
- Language: English

Rise is a Zimbabwean 2025 short film written and directed by Jessica J. Rowlands and produced by Joe Njagu. Starring Tongayi Chirisa and Sikhanyiso Ngwenya, the film follows a young boy navigating hardship and seeking safety and hope in a hostile environment. It is the first Zimbabwean film to screen at the Tribeca Festival, and was eligible for Oscar consideration for the 2026 Academy Awards.

== Synopsis ==
Rise follows a young boy named Rise, who lives alone on a rubbish dump in Zimbabwe and survives by his determination and resilience. After being attacked by local bullies, he is noticed by Coach Tobias, a withdrawn boxing trainer who reluctantly intervenes and brings the boy to safety. Despite the coach’s initial resistance, Rise pursues him with persistence, hoping to learn to fight and protect himself. As the coach gradually allows him into his training sessions, the two form an unexpected bond, revealing their own vulnerabilities: Rise’s struggle for security and belonging, and Tobias’s quiet burden of responsibility and past loss. Through their evolving relationship, the film explores themes of trust, mentorship, and the search for strength in difficult circumstances.

== Cast ==
- Tongayi Chirisa as Coach Tobias
- Sikhanyiso Ngwenya as Rise
- Edmet Duce as Godknows
- Kelvin Taliana as Fortune
- Cilemeko Tickey Mudenda as Never
- Charles Ndlovu as Doctor
- Prudence Mubaiwa as Nurse
- Samson Mdimba as Boxer
- Phineas Makuvaza as Referee
- Tobia Mupfuti as Godknow’s Coach

== Production ==
Rise was written and directed by Jessica J. Rowlands and produced by Joe Njagu. The film was shot on location in Zimbabwe using a fully African cast and crew. It was inspired by the true story of Victoria Falls–based boxing coach Tobias Mupfuti, whose work with vulnerable children informed the narrative. Mupfuti collaborated with the filmmakers throughout production to ensure an authentic portrayal.

== Release ==
Rise had its world premiere at the Tribeca Festival on June 8, 2025, becoming the first Zimbabwean film ever selected for the event, and screened in the Narrative Short category.

In June 2025, Rise was announced as part of the “Spotlight: Children’s Resilience with Shine Global” category at the Indy Shorts International Film Festival.

In September 2025, Rise was announced as part of the San Diego International Film Festival lineup in the “Short and Sweet” category, and later won the festival’s Audience Choice Short Award. In October 2025, the film had its Georgia premiere at the Savannah Film Festival and received the award for Best Professional Short. In November 2025, it screened at the Denver Film Festival.

== Reception ==
In July 2025, Rise won the Shine Global Children’s Resilience Short Film Award at the Indy Shorts International Film Festival. In its announcement, Shine Global noted that the film uses boxing as a backdrop for a story centred on the connection between a young boy and his coach, highlighted the performance of first-time child actor Sikhanyiso Ngwenya, and described the film as conveying how children can find strength and opportunity when given support.

In October 2025, Rise won three awards at the Lady Filmmakers Festival in Beverly Hills: Best Short Film, Best Actor for Tongayi Chirisa, and Best Up-and-Coming Young Actor for Sikhanyiso Ngwenya. In the same month, it won Best International Short Film at the British Urban Film Festival.

In November 2025, actor Viola Davis publicly endorsed the film on her social media platforms, describing it as a deeply affecting story with strong performances.
