= Olley Maruma =

Filmmaker from Zimbabwe

- Born: Olley Tsino Maruma; Zimbabwe
- Died: 2010
- Education: University of Kent
- Occupation: filmmaker
- Notable work: The Assegai

Olley Tsino Maruma (died 2010) was one of the Black pioneering filmmakers in Zimbabwe. He was one of the few Black people owning a production company after the country's independence in 1980. He is credited with the early growth and development of Zimbabwe's film industry.

== Background ==
Maruma was born in Zimbabwe. While in England, he attended the University of Kent in Canterbury where he graduated with a BA Honours in Law, attained Television Production Training at the British Council's Media Department in London and was an intern at the BBC’s Current Affairs Television Programme, Out of Court. He wrote a semi-autobiographical novel about his exile years and his return to Zimbabwe called, Coming Home published in 2007. He died in 2010.

== Filmography ==
- The Assegai (1982)
- Quest for Freedom (1981)
- After the Hunger and Drought (1988)
- Consequences (1988)
