= List of Zimbabwean films =

This is an alphabetical list of films produced in Zimbabwe:

== A ==
- Accidental Small House (2018)
- Across the Grasslands (2016)
- Aliens Beyond Boundaries (2015)
- Always Take the Weather with You (2004)
- The Assegai (1982)

== B ==
- Bag Rabvaruka: Trilogy (2012)
- The Bicycle Thief (2014)
- Bitter Pill (2006)
- Botso (2017)

== C ==
- Chabvondoka (2013)
- Chinhoyi 7 (2015)
- The Christening (2014)
- City of Dreams (2011)
- Le Complot d'Aristote (1996)
- Consequences (1987)
- Criminal on the Cross (2010)
- Cook Off (2017)
- Chlorophyll Universe 1 (2024)

== D ==
- Dust and Fortunes (2013)
- Death And Other Complications (2018)

== E ==
- Elements: Genesis 3-D (2014)
- Everyone's Child (1996)
- The Eye of Providence (2012)

== F ==
- Far From Yesterday (2015)
- Fatima (2015)
- Fate (2015)
- Flame (1996)

== G ==
- The Gentleman (2011)
- Gomorinoyera (2014)
- Gringo, The Troublemaker (2013)

== H ==
- Heartless aka Chi Chi (2011)
- Home Sweet Home (2001)

== I ==
- I Am the Future (1993)
- I Can Hear Zimbabwe Calling (1980)
- I Want a Wedding Dress (2010)
- IThemba (2010)

== J ==
- Jazz tales (1997)
- Jit (1990)
- Journey from the Jacarandas (1997)
- Jungle Beat: I Want to Break Free

== K ==
- Kare Kare Zvako: Mother's Day (2005)
- King Solomon's Mine (1985)
- Kiriboni (2013)
- The Kiss (2010)
- Kushata Kwemoyo (2017)
- Kutonga Kwaro Murudo (2021)

== L ==
- The Legend of the Sky Kingdom (2004)
- Lobola (2010)
- The Lost Letter (2017)

== M ==
- Marrying the Devil (2014)
- Mayaya - The Seed of Corruption (2014)
- MaZimba! Til His Wife Do Us Part (2011)
- Mr. Bean (2016)
- Moonlight Cross (2014)
- More Time (1993)
- Music for Stress (2011)
- Music of the Spirits (1989)
- Mind Games (2017)
- Mbereko The Movie (2021)
- Mirage (2020) malaika mushandu

== N ==
- Neria (1993)
- Ngoma Buntibe, Music of the Valley Tonga (2000)
- No Way Out (2016)
- Ngoda (2023) joe njagu & eddie sandifolo

== P ==
- Pamvura (2005)
- Peretera Maneta (Spell My Name) (2006)
- Playing Warriors (2011)

== R ==
- Riches (2001)
- Room 203 (2013)
- Rent, P. Nkala (2017)

== S ==
- Sabhuku Vharazipi (2012)
- Sabhuku Vharazipi 2 (2013)
- Seven (2021)
- Shadow Weavers: The End Game (2011)
- Shamwari (1980)
- Shungu (2007)
- Shungu Dzemoyo (2013)
- Sores of Emmanuel (2010)
- Still Life (1999)
- Something Nice from London (2015)
- Stay with Me (2019)
- Shaina (2020)

== T ==
- Tamba Wakachenjera (2013)
- Tanyaradzwa (2005)
- The Search (2006)
- The Terrific Nights (2007)
- That's Me (2001)
- Through the Night (2013)
- Tides of Gold (1998)
- Twisted (2010)
- The Letter (2019)
- Tete B (2018)
- Tiriparwendo (2008)
- Thandie's Diary (2018)
- Two Dead Government Officials (2020)

== U ==
- The Unexpected (2014)

== V ==
- Varsity: Mirror of Personality (2012)
- Village Secrets (2019)

== W ==
- Whispering Death (1976)
- A World Apart (1988)

== Y ==
- Yellow Card (2000)
- You Owe Me (2011)
- You Never Know (Valentines Breakfast) (2018)

== Z ==
- Zambezi (2013)
- Zimbabwe 2100 (2014)
- The Zimbabwean Marimba of Alport Mhlanga (2000)
- Zvoitwasei by Leonard Chibamu (2014)
