= Mabasa =

Mabasa may be,

- Ignatius Mabasa (born 1971), Zimbabwean author
- Noria Mabasa (born 1938), South African women artist
- a district in Dupax del Norte, Philippines
