= Bella Awa Gassama =

Gambian actress

- Other names: Awa Gassama
- Education: Jollof Tutors College
- Occupation: Actress
- Years active: 2004–present
- Relatives: Bakary "Papa" Gassama

Bella Awa Gassama is a Gambian actress.

== Biography ==
Gassama is the half-sister of noted soccer referee Bakary "Papa" Gassama. She completed her O-level in science at the Marina International School in 2004. She made her film debut the same year, in Arrou (Prevention). The film was shown at the Pan-African Film Festival in Los Angeles, and Gassama was nominated for Best Actress in a Supporting Role at the 2nd Africa Movie Academy Awards. She was also nominated for Best Gambian Actress at the Vinasha film festival. She completed her Certified Accounting Technician (CAT) certification at Jollof Tutors College in 2008. Also in 2008, Gassama starred in her first Nigerian film, My Gambian Holiday alongside Desmond Elliot and Oge Okoye. She had a supporting role in the 2011 critically acclaimed film Mirror Boy alongside Fatima Jabbe and Genevieve Nnaji. In 2012, Gassama completed a banking and finance course at the Task Crown College.

Gassama had a role in Sidy Diallo's 2014 film The Soul. She was nominated for Best Supporting Actor in the Zulu African Film Academy Awards. She starred in the 2019 TV series Nakala. In November 2019, Gassama married the US-based online political activist Pa Lie Low.

== Partial filmography ==
- 2004: Arrou (Prevention)
- 2008: My Gambian Holiday
- 2011: Mirror Boy
- 2013: Wrong Identity
- 2014: The Soul
- 2019: Nakala (TV series)
