= Mayfair Apartments =

Mayfair Apartments may refer to:

- Mayfair Apartments (Chicago)
- Mayfair Apartments (Los Angeles)
- Mayfair House (Philadelphia)
- Mayfair Mansions Apartments (Washington DC)

== See also ==
- Mayfair Hotel
