= Lucian Msamati =

British actor (born 1976)

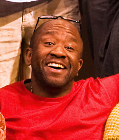
- Msamati in 2010
- Born: Lucian Gabriel Wiina Msamati; 5 March 1976 (age 50); Lambeth, London, England
- Occupations: Actor, director, producer, writer
- Years active: 1997–present
- Children: 2

Lucian Gabriel Wiina Msamati (born 5 March 1976) is a British-Tanzanian actor, director, producer, and writer. He is known for his work in theatre, film, television and radio. His notable screen roles include Salladhor Saan in the HBO series Game of Thrones, J.L.B. Matekoni in the BBC/HBO adaptation of The No. 1 Ladies' Detective Agency, David Runihura in the Netflix/BBC thriller Black Earth Rising, Ed Dumani in the Sky/AMC series Gangs of London and Cardinal Adeyemi in Conclave.

In theatre, Msamati was the first Black actor to portray Iago at the Royal Shakespeare Company, in a 2015 production of Othello. He has also performed other significant roles such as Toledo in the National Theatre's revival of August Wilson's Ma Rainey's Black Bottom in 2016, Antonio Salieri in the National Theatre's revival of Amadeus in 2017–2018, and Arturo Ui in Brecht's The Resistible Rise of Arturo Ui at the Lyric Hammersmith in 2008. Additionally, he portrayed Kevin/Albert in Clybourne Park by Bruce Norris at the Royal Court Theatre and The Wyndhams Theatre in the West End from 2010 to 2011.

Msamati is a patron of Lewisham Youth Theatre, WildChild and The Actor's Children's Trust (ACT) and currently serves on the board of trustees at the Donmar Warehouse.

== Early life and education ==
Msamati was born at St Thomas' Hospital, Lambeth, London on 5 March 1976 and brought up in Zimbabwe by his Tanzanian parents, a doctor and a nurse. After secondary education at Prince Edward School in Harare, he studied towards a BA honours degree in French and Portuguese at the University of Zimbabwe from 1995 to 1997.

== Career ==
=== Theatre ===
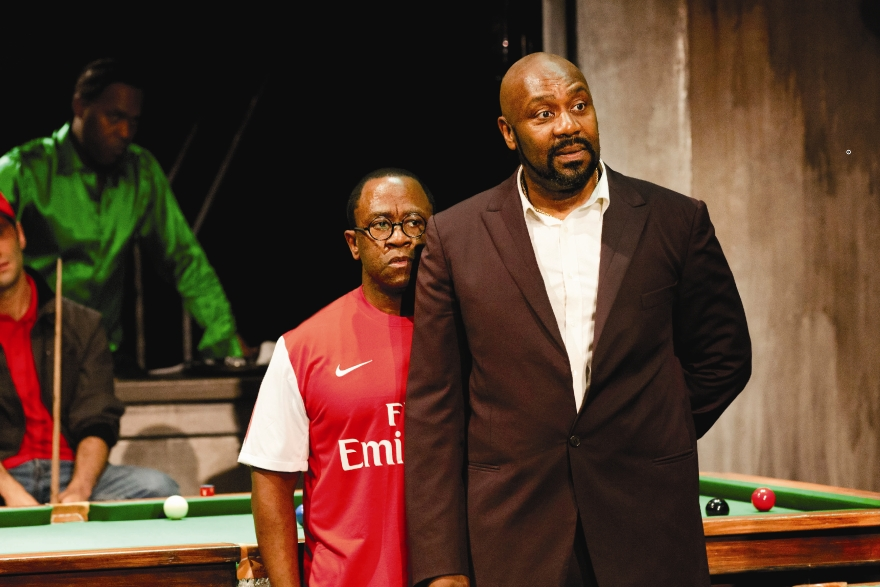
Msamati (left) and Lenny Henry in the Royal National Theatre production of The Comedy of Errors in 2011

After university, he worked as an advertising copywriter and freelance radio presenter. He also worked as a voice-over artist, compère and after-dinner speaker.

In 1994, Msamati and some school friends founded the Over the Edge Theatre Company in Harare. The company celebrated its 10th anniversary in December 2004, having toured Europe, the United States and South Africa. From 1998 to 2001, it performed at the Edinburgh Festival Fringe in Edinburgh, Scotland; some plays were written by Msamati. The last few years have seen individual members pursuing other interests and although not officially disbanded, there are no immediate plans for an Over the Edge reunion.

In November 2010, Msamati was appointed the artistic director of British-African theatre company Tiata Fahodzi, until being succeeded in 2014 by Natalie Ibu. He has continued to work with Tiata Fahodzi, directing Boi Boi is Dead in February–March 2015.

In the spring of 2015, Msamati became the first black actor ever to play Iago in a Royal Shakespeare Company production of Othello (with Hugh Quarshie in the title role).

From October 2016 to March 2017 and from February to April 2018, he performed in the leading role of Antonio Salieri in Peter Shaffer's play Amadeus at the National Theatre, a performance which Michael Billington, in a four-starred review for The Guardian, described as "excellent".

In 2019, he starred as Sam in Master Harold and the Boys at the Royal National Theatre.

Msamati has appeared in several other theatrical productions in London, UK, including:

- Fabulation, Tricycle Theatre
- Gem of the Ocean, Tricycle Theatre
- I.D., Almeida Theatre
- Mourning Becomes Electra, Royal National Theatre
- The Overwhelming, Royal National Theatre
- Pericles, Prince of Tyre, played the title role, Royal Shakespeare Company
- President of an Empty Room, Royal National Theatre
- The Resistible Rise of Arturo Ui, Lyric Hammersmith
- Walk Hard, Tricycle Theatre
- Death and the King's Horseman, Royal National Theatre
- Ruined, Almeida Theatre
- Clybourne Park, Royal Court Theatre

=== Television ===
He has also appeared in several television productions, including episodes of the television series Ultimate Force and Spooks. In 2008, he took on his most prominent role, playing JLB Matekoni in the BBC/HBO-produced series The No. 1 Ladies' Detective Agency. He has guest starred in episodes of the BBC television series Luther, Ashes to Ashes, Doctor Who, Taboo, and Death in Paradise, as well as playing the part of the pirate Salladhor Saan in the HBO series Game of Thrones. He recently appeared as Lord Faa in His Dark Materials on BBC One. In 2020 Msamati appeared as Ed Dumani in Sky Atlantic's Gangs of London and in an episode of the BBC's production of Alan Bennett's Talking Heads.

=== Film ===
Msamati appeared in the film The International (2009). Other film credits include Lumumba (1999), directed by Raoul Peck; the animated feature The Legend of the Sky Kingdom (2003), directed by Roger Hawkins and Richard II, directed by Rupert Goold.

=== Radio ===
Msamati appeared as Matthew in the BBC Radio 4 drama Burned to Nothing (2011) by Rex Obano.

== Personal life ==
Msamati permanently moved to the UK in 2003, and now resides in London. He is married and has two children, a son and a daughter.

== Filmography ==
=== Film ===
Year	Title	Role	Notes
2003	The Legend of the Sky Kingdom	Italiano (voice)	Credited as Wina Msamati
2009	The International	General Charles Motomba	
2016	Seekers	Yusuf	Short film
2019	The Good Liar	Beni	
2020	Zog and the Flying Doctors	The Lion (voice)	Short film
2022	See How They Run	Max Mallowan	
2024	Conclave	Cardinal Adeyemi	

=== Television ===
Year	Title	Role	Notes
1997	The Knock	Doctor	Series 3, episode 2 Credited as Wina Msamati
2005	Ultimate Force	Blessed	Episode: "Never Go Back"
2006	Spooks	Manu Buffong	Series 5, episode 4 Uncredited
2008–2009	The No. 1 Ladies' Detective Agency	JLB Matekoni	7 episodes
2009	10 Minute Tales	Flirty Orderly	
2010	Doctor Who	Guido	Episode: "The Vampires of Venice"
2010	Ashes to Ashes	Tobias Ndbele	Series 3, episode 7
2012	The Hollow Crown	Bishop of Carlisle	Episode: Richard II
2012–2014	Game of Thrones	Salladhor Saan	3 episodes
2013	Death in Paradise	Dr Johnson	Episode: "Murder on the Plantation"
2013	Doctors	Joseph Segunle	Episode: "Thicker Than Water"
2013	Holby City	Dumisani Themba	Episode: "Ask Me No Questions"
2013	Luther	Ken Barnaby	2 episodes
2015	Inspector George Gently	Ellison	Episode: "Son of a Gun"
2015	Urban Myths	Herbert Muhammed	Episode: "The Greatest. Of All Time."
2017	Taboo	George Chichester	
2017	Electric Dreams	The Director	Episode: "Crazy Diamond"
2018	Kiri	Tobi Akindele	Miniseries
2018	Black Earth Rising	David Runihura	
2019	His Dark Materials	John Faa	TV series
2020	Talking Heads	Wilfred Paterson	Episode: "Playing Sandwiches"
2020–2025	Gangs of London	Ed Dumani	TV series
2023	Best Interests	Derek	Miniseries
2025	Hostage	Kofi Adomako	Miniseries
2026	Run Away	Cornelius Faber	Miniseries
2026	Slow Horses	Oliver	Series 6
