= 2nd Africa Movie Academy Awards =

2006 film awards ceremony

- Date: Saturday, 29 April 2006
- Site: Gloryland Cultural Center; Yenagoa, Bayelsa State, Nigeria
- Organized by: Africa Film Academy

Highlights
- Best Picture: Rising Moon

The 2nd Africa Movie Academy Awards ceremony was held on 29 April 2006, at the Gloryland Cultural Center in Yenagoa, Bayelsa State, Nigeria, to honor the best African films of 2005. The ceremony was broadcast live on Nigerian national television. Numerous celebrities and top Nigerian politicians attended the event, including Goodluck Jonathan (former Governor of Bayelsa State) and various Nollywood actresses and actors. The special guest was South African Grammy Award-winning artist Miriam Makeba, who performed at the ceremony. Nigerian veteran actor and playwright Hubert Ogunde received a posthumous award.

== Winners ==
=== Major awards ===
The winners of the 19 Award Categories are listed first and highlighted in bold letters.

Best Picture	Best Director
Rising Moon (Nigeria); Secret Adventure (Nigeria); Behind Closed Door (Nigeria); Anini (Nigeria); Arrou - Prevention (Nigeria); Tanyaradzwa (Zimbabwe); My Mother’s Heart (Ghana); Sofia (Burkina Faso)	Andy Nwakolor – Rising Moon; Lancelot Imasuen - Behind Closed Door; Andy Amenechi - Secret Adventure; Lancelot Imasuen - Family Battle; Fred Amata - Anini; Teco Benson - Day of Atonement; Ifeanyi Onyeabor - My Mother’s Heart; Boubakar Diallo - Sofia
Best Actress in a leading role	Best Actor in a leading role
Joke Silva - Widow’s Cot; Stella Damasus - Behind Closed Door; Onyeka Onwenu - Rising Moon; Akofa Asiedu - My Mother’s Heart; Alima Qiedraego - Sofia; Maradzika - Tanyaradzwa	Kanayo O. Kanayo - Family Battle; Osita Iheme & Chinedu Ikedieze - Secret Adventure; Bil Aka - Sofia; Nosa Ehinwen - Anini; Modu Cessay - Arrou (Prevention)
Best Actress in a Supporting Role	Best Actor in a Supporting Role
Onyeka Onwenu - Widow’s Cot; Georgina Onuoha - Secret Adventure; Oge Okoye - Eagle’s Bride; Adji Dialo - Sofia; Awa Gassama - Arrou (Prevention)	Justice Esiri - Rising Moon; Desmond Elliot - Behind Closed Door; Emeka Enyiocha - Family Battle; Arnold Chirisa - Tanyaradzwa; Kofi Adjorlolo - My Mother’s Heart; Henry Legema - Anini
Best Upcoming Actress	Best Upcoming Actor
Tendal Musoni - Tanyaradzwa; Chika Ike - To Love a Stranger; Lilian Ikpe - Behind Closed Door; Elezra Ofori - My Mother’s Heart	Sam Anyamela - Day of Atonement; Akume Akume - Rising Moon; Kalu Ikeagwu - Fragile Pain; Alagie Sarr - Arrou (Prevention)
Best Cinematography	Best Screenplay
Tanyaradzwa (Zimbabwe); Day of Atonement (Nigeria); Rising Moon (Nigeria); Family Battle (Nigeria); Sofia (Burkino Faso); My Mother's Heart (Ghana)	Eagle's Bride (Nigeria); Anini (Nigeria); Behind Closed Doors (Nigeria); Arrou (Gambia); Tanyaradzwa (Zimbabwe)
Best Musical Score	Best Sound
Sofia (Burkina Faso); Behind Closed Doors (Nigeria); Secret Adventure (Nigeria); Arrou (Gambia); Tanyaradzwa (Zimbabwe)	Widow's Cot (Nigeria); Eagle's Bride (Nigeria); Behind Closed Doors (Nigeria); Secret Adventure (Nigeria); Rising Moon (Nigeria); Arrou (Gambia)
Best Makeup	Best Costume
My Mother's Heart (Ghana); Eagle's Bride (Nigeria); Secret Adventure (Nigeria); Rising Moon (Nigeria)	Eagle's Bride (Nigeria); Secret Adventure (Nigeria); Rising Moon (Nigeria); Arrou (Gambia)
Best Editing	Best Original Effects
Rising Moon (Nigeria); Family Battle (Nigeria); Day of Atonement (Nigeria); Sofia (Burkino Faso)	Day of Atonement (Nigeria); Widow's Cot (Nigeria); Rising Moon (Nigeria); My Mother's Heart (Ghana)
Best Visual Effects	Best Documentary
Rising Moon (Nigeria); Behind Closed Doors (Nigeria); Secret Adventure (Nigeria); My Mother's Heart (Ghana)	Tasuma; Ending a cane; House of love; Nollywood the young side of film; Salma yoba
Best Indigenous Film	Best Marketer
Izza; Mama Dearest; Agbara Oderest; Mfana Mbagha	A-Z
Best Soap
Desperate Millionaire
