= Jessica J. Rowlands =

British filmmaker

Jessica J. Rowlands is a British screenwriter and director. Her directorial debut, Rise, became the first Zimbabwean film to screen at the Tribeca Festival and to qualify for consideration at the Academy Awards.

== Biography ==
Rowlands was born in the United Kingdom to parents who relocated to Hwange, Zimbabwe, in 1984. Her upbringing was shaped by her family's connection to the region, with her father working at the local power station and her mother teaching and later settling permanently in Victoria Falls as a Zimbabwean citizen. She graduated with a law degree before completing further studies at the University of Chicago Law School.

In 2019, Rowlands won the UCLA Screenwriting Competition, and in 2020 she became the program’s only writer to have received awards in both the Feature Screenplay and Writing for Television categories when her pilot script Ruby won the UCLA Writing for Television Drama Competition. In December 2020, Rowlands was a Nicholl Fellowship finalist for her screenplay Wild Hearts, a drama about a young mother in rural Zimbabwe who is recruited into an all-female anti-poaching unit.

In 2025, Rowlands wrote and directed Rise, a Zimbabwean short film that had its world premiere at Tribeca Festival, becoming the first Zimbabwean film selected for the event. She drew inspiration for the screenplay from the real-life story of her close friend Tobias Mupfuti, founder of a community boxing academy in Victoria Falls that provides housing, education, and training to vulnerable children. Rise went on to win three awards at the Lady Filmmakers Festival in Beverly Hills—Best Short Film, Best Actor, and Best Up-and-Coming Young Actor—which Rowlands described as a significant moment for Zimbabwean cinema and for strengthening international visibility for locally produced films. Rise later became the first Zimbabwean film to qualify for consideration at the 2026 Academy Awards.
