= The Oxford Student =

Student newspaper at the University of Oxford

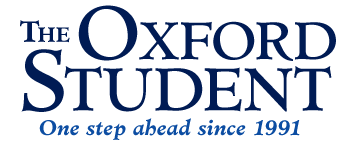

- Front page of The Oxford Student on 31 May 2020
- Type: Weekly newspaper during Oxford University term time
- Format: Broadsheet
- Editor: Luke Erly and Ellie Apostolidi
- Founded: 1991; 35 years ago
- Language: English
- Country: United Kingdom
- Circulation: c. 15,000 (2014)
- Website: www.oxfordstudent.com

The Oxford Student is an independent newspaper produced by and for students of the University of Oxford; often abbreviated to The OxStu. The paper was established in 1991 by the Oxford University Student Union (Oxford SU) and is published fortnightly every Friday during term time.

== Structure ==
The Oxford Student is an independent paper as of Michaelmas 2025, and board members were appointed to help guide the paper through the transition period.

Two Editors-In-Chief are appointed each term by the previous editorial board and the managing board of directors, which consists of alumni of the paper. The current directors are Chris Allnutt, Louis Barclay, Rodrigo Davies, Zoe Flood, Joseph McAuley, Tom Ough, Lauren Shirreff, and Isobel Wanstall. The Editors-In-Chief are current students of the university who have complete editorial autonomy over the paper. After their appointment in the final weeks of term, they are responsible for releasing editorial team applications for the upcoming term, inviting applicants to interview. Applications are competitive, and a team of anywhere from 30 to 80 students are accepted to edit and work on the publication each term.

Current sections of the newspaper include: News, Opinion, Investigations, Features, Identity, Profiles, Business & Finance, Culture, OxYou (satire), and Sports. In addition, there is a Broadcasting Team which produces video content for the paper's website and social media platforms.

In response to the COVID-19 pandemic and the resulting lack of sports fixtures within the university, the Sports section was temporarily changed to E-sports and Gaming in Trinity 2020.

In Hilary 2021, a new Green section was added to cover environmental and sustainability issues.

== Inclusivity ==
In Michaelmas 2016, the newspaper introduced Pink (aimed towards LGBTQIA+ members of the university) as a sub-section of Features; due to its popularity, in Hilary 2017, Pink was launched as its own section. Edited and written by non-heterosexual or non-cisgender students, the newspaper regularly anonymises the Pink articles in order to protect the identities of writers who do not feel comfortable publicly authoring articles relating to LGBTQIA+ issues.

In January 2020, a new section was created called Identity, described as being "dedicated to spotlighting the issues, opinions and experiences of BAME students within the University". Structured similarly to Pink, the editors of Identity - as well as those who submit writing to be published in the section - are BAME students at the university.

== Accolades ==
The Oxford Student was named "Student Newspaper of the Year" at the Guardian Student Media Awards in 2001, was shortlisted in 2004 and 2012, and awarded the runner-up prize in 2007.

== Controversies ==
In 2004, the newspaper gained national publicity when two reporters broke University rules to expose security flaws in the university's computer network; the student journalists responsible, Patrick Foster and Roger Waite, were rusticated by the University Court of Summary Jurisdiction, but on appeal their punishment was reduced to a fine. Foster later worked as Media Correspondent for The Times, and Waite worked for the Sunday Times for a few years after graduating.

In June 2021, the newspaper was the subject of controversy over perceived threats to their independence, after a vetting system was proposed which would have required student articles to be reviewed by university-affiliated readers. In February 2025, Cherwell published a story accusing the Oxford University Student Union of suppressing the newspaper's editorial independence. A private letter from three former editors-in-chief alleged that they had faced "overbearing censorship" when attempting to publish a story about OUSU issuing an apology to a former student union president.

== Notable contributors ==
Former contributors include Laura Barton and Jonathan Wilson of The Guardian, Mark Henderson and Rob Hands of The Times, Karl Smith of The Independent, and Tamara Cohen, formerly Sky News political correspondent.
