= Zoe Flood =

British journalist, filmmaker and producer

- Occupations: Journalist; Filmmaker

Zoe Flood is an independent journalist and filmmaker whose work spans broadcast, print, and digital media. Her journalism and documentary filmmaking have been featured by outlets, including the BBC, The Guardian, The New York Times, Huffington Post, Al Jazeera and more.

Flood is a recipient of the Association of British Science Writers' Feature of the Year (General) award for her article Inside the Botswana Lab That Discovered Omicron, which reported on the scientists who first sequenced the Omicron COVID-19 variant and the impact of subsequent travel restrictions on several African countries.

== Career ==
Flood has been reporting on politics, human rights, business, technology and health across Africa and the Middle East since 2010. Her work ranges from covering breaking news events, including the ouster of Robert Mugabe in Zimbabwe and the Westgate shopping mall attack in Kenya, to producing long-form, multi-platform investigations. In 2016, she was part of the BAFTA-winning team behind My Son the Jihadi, which was named Best Single Documentary that year.

In 2019, Flood travelled to Uganda to make the BBC Africa Eye documentary Gamblers Like Me: The Dark Side of Sports Betting, which examined the rise of gambling across Africa. Her investigation showed how betting companies target the continent’s young population through football sponsorships, celebrity endorsements, and easily accessible mobile betting platforms.

In December 2021, Flood wrote about the team in Botswana who first sequenced the Omicron COVID variant. The piece won 'Feature of the Year' at the 2022 Association of British Science Writers Awards. The judges' note stated that it was "an accessible feature that shines a light on the unknown scientists who identified Omicron at a time when countries were being stigmatised for detecting new Covid variants."

Flood was an Edit Producer and Archive Producer on 9/11: Inside the President’s War Room, a BBC/AppleTV+ feature documentary marking the 20th anniversary of the attacks. 9/11 won the Editing Bafta in 2022, for which Zoe Flood was the Edit Producer. In 2023, she directed the BBC Africa Eye documentary Breaking the Silence: Abortion Rights in Kenya. The film's presenter, Linda Ngari, received the Gaby Rado Award for New Journalist at the 2024 Amnesty Media Awards and the Michael Elliott Award for Excellence in African Storytelling in 2024.

In 2024, Flood presented her documentary Gamblers Like Me: The Dark Side of Sports Betting at Play the Game and gave an updated assessment of Africa’s rapidly growing gambling problem. During her talk, she warned that gambling harm in Africa is far worse than in Western countries, citing research suggesting one in five young people may be problem gamblers.

In 2025, Flood was shortlisted for the Fetisov Journalism Awards in the category of Outstanding Contribution to Peace for The Long Road to Justice for Sexual War Crimes, alongside Neha Wadekar.

Zoe Flood is a current director responsible for the publishing of The Oxford Student following its independence.

== Education ==
Zoe Flood attended Keble College (University of Oxford) between 2002 and 2005, reading for a degree in Modern History and Politics. During her time at Keble, she was the Junior Common Room's Vice-President.

In 2004, Flood co-founded Oxford Media Society. She edited The Oxford Student newspaper in 2003, and also served as a Deputy Editor for The Isis Magazine.

Zoe Flood is now featured in Keble College's portraits exhibition.

== Filmography ==
Year	Film	Role	Genre	Note	Ref
2017	Cook Off	Executive Producer	Feature Film	Zimbabwean first Netflix acquisition	
2019	Gamblers Like Me	Producer, Director	Documentary Film	BBC Africa Eye Documentary	
2023	Breaking the Silence	Producer, Director	Documentary Film	BBC Africa Eye Documentary	
2024	Africa: The Battle for the Ballot Box	Producer, Director	Documentary Film	BBC Africa Documentary	
2025	Rise	Executive Producer	Short Film		
