= Mayfair, California =

Mayfair, California may refer to the following places in the United States:

- Mayfair, Fresno County, California
- Mayfair, San Jose, California

== See also ==
- Mayfair Music Hall, in Santa Monica, California
