= Karen Mutasa =

Zimbabwean entrepreneur

Karen Mutasa is a Zimbabwean entrepreneur, philanthropist, and venture capitalist. She is the vice president of Restaurant Operators' Association of Zimbabwe and commissioner at the Zimbabwe Sports and Recreation Commission.

== Background ==
Karen Mutasa was born in Blantyre, Malawi, moving to Zimbabwe at an early age. She began her career as an entrepreneur in 1993. She founded The Skin Spa Group through which she established Organikks Restaurant, Masawara Urban Retreat and the International Skin Spa College of Beauty.

Skin Spa Group won at the World Luxury Spa Awards for four consecutive years. She partnered Catts Beaute, which is the official Fenty Beauty distribution partner in Zimbabwe.

In 2017, she was appointed as a judge for the season 3 of the ZBC TV's Battle of the Chefs: Harare television show.

In 2019, she founded the Solidarity Trust Zimbabwe (SOTZIM) with a consortium of 11 other trustees. Through the organisation, she raised $1.5 million to revitalize St. Anne's Hospital, which had been shut down for over seven years.

She established an international college of beauty certified by CIDESCO AND ITEC that sponsors young women annually to gain international certification in the beauty industry.

In 2022, she launched the Come Back Home initiative to facilitate the return of struggling Zimbabweans from the diaspora. She founded the Jason Moyo Project to rehabilitate Harare CBD and create employment.

== Positions ==
- Lifelong trustee of ZIMPACT since 2008
- Patron for Teen Rescue Mission
- Cresta Hotels Group board member
- Sports and Recreation Commission (SRC) Business Development Committee chairperson 2019
- Central African Distribution Company (rebranded to Nuance SSA)
- Restaurant Operators' Association of Zimbabwe (ROAZ) vice president

== Awards ==
- African Women Awards 2015 - Living Legacy Award
- Honoree - Africa Giving Gala & Awards
