= International Images Film Festival for Women =

The International Images Film Festival for Women (IIFF) is an annual international film festival established in 2002 in Harare in Zimbabwe. It is one of the few women's film festival in sub-Saharan Africa.

Zimbabwean author and filmmaker Tsitsi Dangarembga established IIFF to celebrate the achievements of women filmmakers, as well as alter the representation of women on film. The festival is run by Dangarembga and the Women Filmmakers of Zimbabwe, and is now held yearly in November, screening films in Harare, Bulawayo and Chimanimani.

The 16th IIFF was held in August 2017 as a joint festival in collaboration with the 19th Zimbabwe International Film Festival. The theme of the 17th IIFF, held at the National Gallery of Zimbabwe in August 2018, was 'Reach Out'. The opening film was She is King. Other films screened were Mukanya, A Female Chief, Under Pressure, Somebody Clap For Me and The Sound of Silence.
