= Rumbi Katedza =

Zimbabwean Film Producer and Director (born 1974)

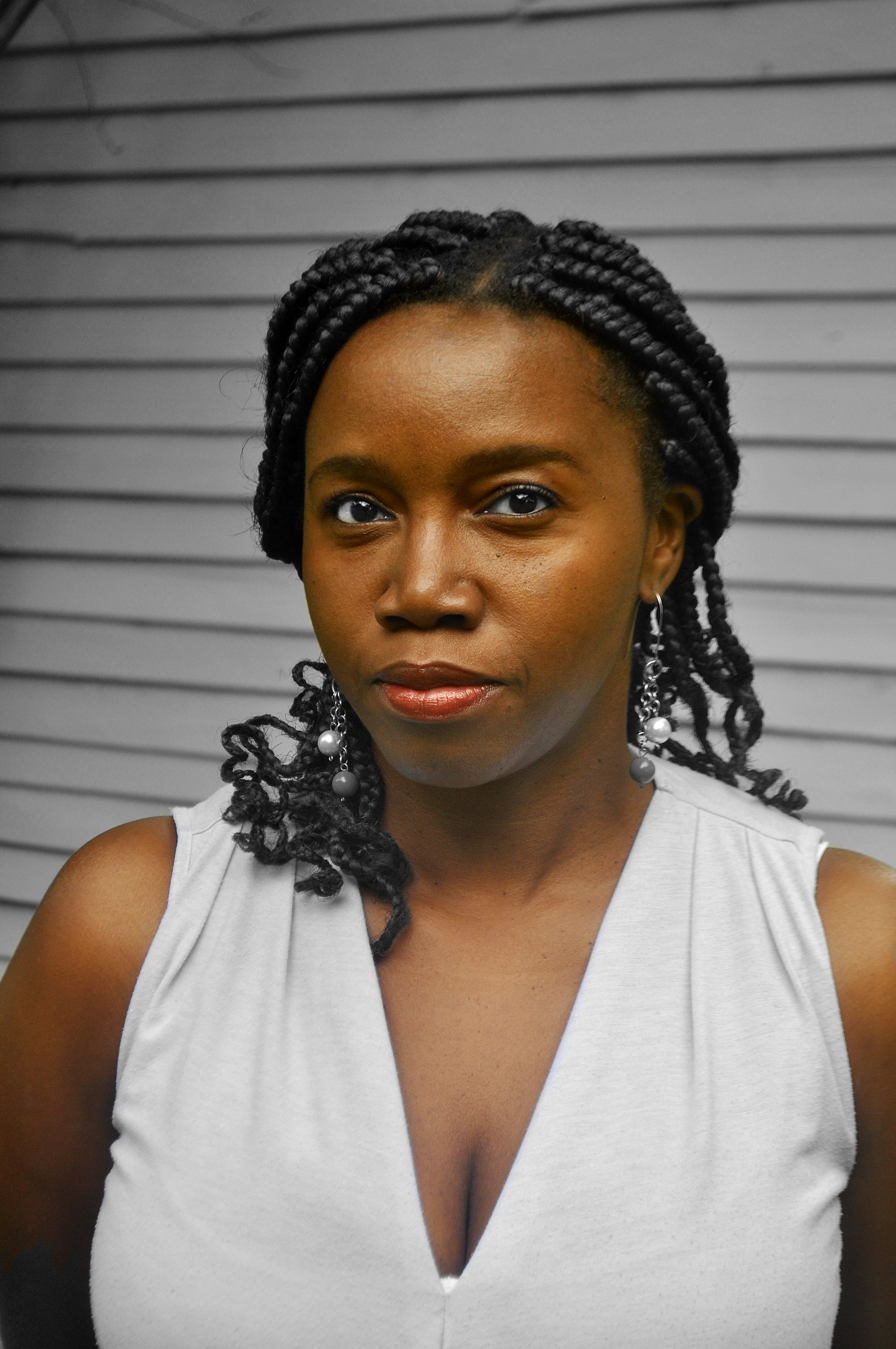
- Born: January 17, 1974 (age 52)
- Education: McGill University; Goldsmiths College, London University
- Occupation: Filmmaker
- Notable work: Playing Warriors

Rumbi Katedza is a Zimbabwean Film Producer and Director who was born on 17 January 1974.

== Early life and education ==
She did her Primary and Secondary Education in Harare, Zimbabwe. Katedza graduated with a Bachelor of Arts in English from McGill University, Canada in 1995. In 2008 Katedza received the Chevening Scholarship that enabled her to further her studies in film. She also holds a MA in Filmmaking from Goldsmiths College, London University.

== Work and filmography ==
Katedza has experience in Film and TV Production, Directing, Writing as well as Producing and presenting Radio shows. From 1994 to 2000, She produced and presented radio shows on Women's issues, Arts and Culture, Hip Hop and Acid Jazz for the CKUT (Montreal) and ZBC Radio 3 (Zimbabwe). From 2004 - 2006, she served as the Festival Director of the Zimbabwe International Film Festival. Whilst there, she produced the Postcards from Zimbabwe Series. In 2008, Katedza founded Mai Jai Films and has produced numerous films and television productions under the banner namely

- Tariro (2008);
- Big House, Small House (2009);
- The Axe and the Tree (2011);
- The Team (2011)
- Playing Warriors (2012)

Her early works include:

- Danai (2002);
- Postcards from Zimbabwe (2006);
- Trapped (2006 – Rumbi Katedza, Marcus Korhonen);
- Asylum (2007);
- Insecurity Guard (2007)

Rumbi Katedza is a part-time lecturer at the University of Zimbabwe, in the department of Theatre Arts. She is a judge and monitor at the National Arts Merit Awards, responsible for monitoring new film and TV productions throughout the year on behalf of the National Arts Council of Zimbabwe. She has also lobbied Zimbabwean government to actively support the film industry.
