= Tamara Cohen =

British news presenter

- Education: University of Oxford
- Occupation: Journalist, political correspondent
- Years active: 2008–2016 (Daily Mail); 2016-2025 (Sky News)
- Works: Sky News

Tamara Cohen is a British political correspondent who worked for Sky News for 10 years until December 2025. She was previously a journalist and editor at the Daily Mail.

== Early life and education ==
Cohen attended the University of Oxford where she studied for a Bachelor of Arts degree in history. Whilst at University, she spent some time working for United Nations Radio as a production assistant. In her final year, she was editor of The Oxford Student.

In 2011 she became environment editor at the Daily Mail, A paper submitted to the Intergovernmental Panel on Climate Change in 2016 claimed that Cohen's journalism in the Daily Mail included "pre-emptive misinformation designed to undermine the IPCC report and climate science in general." After her role as Environment Editor, Cohen moved to being a political journalist for the Daily Mail and a member of The Lobby. In The Routledge Companion to Media and Human Rights (2017), one of Cohen's Daily Mail articles is described as "a useful illustration of modality and metaphorical vernacular so characteristic of the tabloid genre and concluding with a reductive journalistic script."

In 2016, she joined the television station Sky News, where she provides political reports and analysis. Stories that she has covered for Sky include the 2016 United Kingdom European Union membership referendum, the end of David Cameron and Boris Johnson's prime ministerships, and the 2017 and 2019 general election campaigns.

Cohen participated in a King's College London Centre for British Politics and Government conference in June 2019, discussing the intimidation and harassment of United Kingdom MPs.
