= Mayfair Theatre =

Mayfair Theatre may refer to:

- Fox Theatre (Portland, Oregon), a demolished theater in Portland previously named Mayfair Theatre
- Mayfair Music Hall, also known as Mayfair Theatre, a former vaudeville theater in Santa Monica, California, opened 1913
- Mayfair Theatre, Baltimore, a vacant theater structure in Baltimore, opened in 1941
- Mayfair Theatre, Dunedin, a live performance venue in Dunedin, New Zealand, opened 1914
- Mayfair Theatre, Ottawa, the oldest active movie theater in Ottawa, opened 1932
- Mayfair Theatre, Sydney, movie theatre in Australia, closed 1979
- Sony Hall, a former Broadway house previously named Mayfair Theatre opened 1938
- May Fair Theatre, in The May Fair Hotel, London
- Columbia Theatre (New York City), later named the Mayfair Theatre, now demolished
