= Tendaiishe Chitima =

Zimbabwean actress

- Born: 1989 or 1990 (age 35–36)
- Education: University of Cape Town Wits Business School
- Occupation: Actress
- Years active: 2013-present
- Notable work: Cook Off (2017)

Tendaiishe Chitima (born 1989 or 1990) is a Zimbabwean actress.

== Biography ==
Chitima described herself as shy growing up in Zimbabwe, and did not consider acting as a career. She attended the University of Cape Town, studying media and journalism. Chitima took a drama course and loved it, deciding to become a professional actress. She did not tell her parents about her plan until after she graduated. Chitima later earned a master's degree in business. During and after her studies, she acted in short films, including Jayson's Hope (2013), which was a Top 10 finalist for the Afrinolly Short Film Competition.

At the beginning of her career, Chitima's roles were on South African television where she played maids and victims of human trafficking, exposing the plight of some migrant women. In 2016, she played Blessing in the second season of the TV series Mutual Friends. She portrayed Adelaide, an orphan involved in human trafficking, in the TV series Isidingo in 2016. In 2017, Chitima was cast as Anesu, a single mother who did not attend university, in the romantic comedy Cook Off. Her character has a passion for cooking, which is realized when her son and grandmother sign her up for a television cooking contest. The film was made for a budget of about $8000, and she chose the role because she liked the social dynamics of the script. It was her first feature film and became a hit on Netflix, with Chitima describing it as a love letter to Zimbabwe. She received the Best Actress award at the Zimbabwe International Film Festival, and Cook Off was named best film. In 2018, she starred in the play Bloom Flame Bloom.

Chitima was selected as one of the French-African Foundation's Young Leaders 2025 cohort, one of 30 selected from 6,000 applications.

She won Best Actress at the 2026 Accra Indie Filmfest (AiF) for her role in the short film God Sleeps on Sundays.

== Partial filmography ==
- 2013: Jayson’s Hope (short film)
- 2014: Evelyn and Tapiwa (short film)
- 2016: Mutual Friends (TV series, as Blessing)
- 2016: Isidingo (TV series, as Adelaide)
- 2017: Cook Off (as Anesu)
- 2018: Guilt (TV series, as Consolation Dube)
- 2019: Into Infinity (short film, as Angela Tariro)
- 2020: Gonarezhou: The Movie (as Thulo)
- 2025: G20 (film) (as Agent Lane)
- 2026: God Sleeps on Sundays
