= Sydney Taivavashe =

Zimbabwean filmmaker (b. 1991)

- Born: 1991 (age 34–35); Masvingo
- Citizenship: Zimbabwe
- Occupations: Director; screenwriter; producer
- Known for: Filmmaking
- Notable work: Gonarezhou: The Movie
- Awards: National Arts Merit Awards

Sydney Taivavashe (born March 20,1991) is a Zimbabwean film director, producer and screenwriter.

== Early life ==
Sydney Taivavashe was born in 1991 in Masvingo, Zimbabwe where he grew up.

== Career ==
Sydney made his debut film in 2006, a short film titled The Terrific Nights. His first feature film Through The Night was nominated at 2014 National Arts Merit Awards in the outstanding feature film category.

In 2017, Sydney won a NAMA award for directing Seiko, a silent short film. In the same year he partnered with the Great Zimbabwe University to produce a feature film titled Solo naMutsai, portraying the experience of students at the university who succumb to peer pressure. In 2019, Sydney wrote, directed and produced an anti-poaching awareness film titled Gonarezhou: The Movie. The film had its world premiere at the Pan African Film Festival in Hollywood in February of 2020. Sydney's next film was the 2021 biopic The Story of Nehanda, a movie about the trial of Zimbabwean iconic spirit medium Mbuya Nehanda.

In 2022, Sydney received another National Art Merit Award for his film Poor Cousins which won the Outstanding Screen Production - Full length film award.

== Filmography ==
- Tamba Wakachengera (2013)
- Through the night 1 (2013)
- Through the night 2 (2016)
- Seiko (Short Film) (2017)
- Solo naMutsai (2018)
- Gonarezhou: The Movie (2020)
- The Story of Nehanda (2021)
- Poor Cousins (2021)

== Awards ==
Year	Ceremony	Award	Result
2014	National Arts Merit Awards	Outstanding Film Through the Night	Nominated
2016	Zimbabwe International Film Festival	Best International Director	Nominated
2017	National Arts Merit Awards	Outstanding Short Film Seiko	Won
2020	Pan-African Film Festival	Programmers Best First Feature Narrative Gonarezhou	Won
2020	Pan-African Film Festival	Best First Feature Director	Won
