= Leroy Gopal =

Zimbabwean Actor

- Born: Leroy Gopal; July 6, 1979 (age 47); Harare, Zimbabwe
- Other name: Fit Man
- Education: Glen View High School; Hartzell High School; AFDA, The School for the Creative Economy
- Occupations: Actor, voice artist
- Years active: 1986–present
- Height: 1.87 m (6 ft 2 in)
- Awards: Best Comedian

Leroy Gopal (born 6 July 1979), is a Zimbabwe-born South African actor, comedian and a voice artist. He is best known for his roles in the films Yellow Card and Strike Back.

== Personal life ==
He was born on 6 July 1979 in Harare, Zimbabwe. When Gopal was 14 years old, his father died. He has one elder sister, Claudia Gopal Muvuti, who is the former title holder of the Iron Woman Zimbabwe. He completed primary education from Blackiston Primary School and then secondary education from Gateway High School and Prince Edward Senior School. He has a BA (Honors) degree in Live Performance and Motion Picture from AFDA, The School for the Creative Economy. He is one of two students to ever win the prestigious M-NET Student of the Year award 2003 and 2004 consecutively.

Gopal is married to South African, Keletso Molefe since 2017. The couple has three children: Kiki Leroy Gopal, Didi Tadiwa, and Mimi Naima.

== Career ==
In 2000, he made his maiden cinema appearance with the film Yellow Card where he played the lead role of soccer player 'Tiyane Tsumba'. From 2006 to 2007, he played the role 'Thabang Ngema' on the SABC 3 soap opera One Way which became highly popular. In 2012, he appeared in SABC 1's sitcom, Ses'Top La in the role as 'Oleshe'. In 2013, he won the award for the Best Actor in a comedy role at South African Film and Television Awards for this role. With the success and established as an accomplished actor, he was hired to act in the TV series Mzansi Love: Kasi Style in 2013. His role was a Kenyan man named 'Joshua Pembe'. He also acted in the short Through the Flight of a feather which was screened at the Cannes Film Festival as well.

In the same year, he acted in the film Seal Team 8 as a Congolese dictator 'Tonga'. Then he made the appearance on TV series Mzansi Magic with the role 'Abomama' which became a popular character throughout the series. In 2014, he played in the SABC1 political series Ihawu le Sizwe. He later founded 'Creation Station Entertainment Company'. Leroy also directed a Zimbabwean music video for the singer Audius Mtawarira.

== Filmography ==
Year	Film	Role	Genre	Ref.
–	Through the Flight of a Feather		Film	
–	Smart Rewards Ride Show		TV series	
1986	Paraffin		TV series	
1993	Generations	Jackson	TV series	
1996	Adventure Unlimited		Film	
1998	Choose Freedom		Film	
2000	Yellow Card	Tiyane Tsumba	Film	
2003	Scarred Instinct	Chidzonga	Short film	
2004	Four Days	Joe	Short film	
2004	Cut	Skinny	Short film	
2005	Binnelanders		TV series	
2005	Hush	Felix	TV series	
2006	Backstage	Duma	TV series	
2006	One Way	Thabang Ngema	TV series	
2007	Andre Metstrepie	Dave	Short film	
2007	Home Affairs	Remy	TV series	
2007	Jacob's Cross	Jacab's Lawyer	TV series	
2008	Surprise!	Zeb Agent	Film	
2009	Siren's Feast		Film	
2010	Hola Mpinji	Doctor Chinyamurindi	TV mini-series	
2010	Night Drive	Tafadzwa	Film	
2011	Mzansi Love Home Affairs		TV series	
2012	The Way	T	TV series	
2012	Ses'Top La		TV series	
2013	Strike Back	Medical Orderly	TV series	
2013	Zabalaza		TV series	
2013	The Game Fact Show		TV series	
2013	The Lost Diaries of Livingstone	Arbian Slave Trader	Film	
2014	Seal Team Eight: Behind Enemy Lines	General Ntonga	Film	
2014	Check-Coast		TV series	
2014	Kite	Doctor	Film	
2014	Ihawu le Sizwe		TV series	
2015	Making A Killing	Bosco	Short film	
2016	The Crisis Caravan	Seleka Sergeant	Film	
2017	Harry's Game	Tanner	Film	
2017	Revolt	Jeandre	Film	
2017	Happy Family	Detective Mpilo	TV series	
2017	All About Love		Film	
2017	It's OK We're Family		TV series	
2017	The Wall		Film	
2018	Ice	N'Koulou	Film	
2018	Beautifully Broken	Matisse	Film	
2018	Mzansi Love: Kasi Style		TV series	
2018	Abomama		TV series	
2019	#Karektas		TV series	
2019	Jozi-H Red Cake – Not the Cooking Show		TV series	
2019	Blackout	Journalist	Short film	
