= The Legend of the Sky Kingdom =

- DVD cover
- Directed by: Roger Hawkins
- Written by: Phil Cunningham
- Produced by: Phil Cunningham; Jacqui Cunningham
- Starring: Jazz Pierre; Miriam Hamblin; Gabriel Phillips; Wina Msamati; Rodney Newman
- Music by: Andrew Baird
- Production company: Sunrise Productions
- Release date: October 2003 (South Africa)
- Running time: 73 minutes
- Country: Zimbabwe
- Language: English

The Legend of the Sky Kingdom is a 2003 animated feature film directed by Roger Hawkins. Produced in Harare, Zimbabwe, the film was the first full-length animated feature film to come out of Africa. It was based on a children's book of the same name by Phil Cunningham, who was also the film's producer.

It was in the 2003 Montreal World Film Festival (African Horizons section) and premiered at the Durban International Film Festival in October 2003. It also screened at the Annecy International Animated Film Festival, Seoul Animation Film Festival, The London Film Festival, The New York African Film Festival, Sithengi/Cape Town World Cinema Festival and Bath Film Festival.

The film has been described as an allegorical tale with the theme of "believing is seeing".

== Plot ==
Three enslaved orphans (Blockhead, Lucky and Squidge) work in the goldmines in the Underground City ruled by the Evil Emperor, and wish for freedom from their gruelling situation. Along with other characters, they escape from the mines and are briefly imprisoned, and make a second getaway to search for a mythical Sky Kingdom. The group appeal to higher forces when confronted by various challenges such as being chased by hyenas, but after eventually forcing the Emperor’s retreat, they are finally welcomed into the Sky Kingdom.

== Production ==
The film was animated using stop motion animation and was made by a team of fifteen people between 1999 and 2002 across two studios. Music from the movie includes a range of singers including Zimbabwean cricketer Henry Olonga.

The found-object aesthetic of the film has been described by the filmmakers as "junkmation", a stylistic choice necessitated by budget considerations as well as inspired by the wire and metalwork of Africa's folk artists, who often transform discarded items into works of art. Director Roger Hawkins described this as wanting to achieve a fresh and unique style linked with Africa. The team sorted and selected junk items from a vacant lot next to their office.

The filmmakers also spent two years custom-building a motion camera out of bicycle parts because they did not have the funds to buy a professional one.

The film does not include a credit listing, as the filmmakers wanted to emphasise the core message of the film instead.

Videovision Entertainment acquired the worldwide distribution rights for the film.

== Reception ==
Variety reviewed the film as having a clever found-object look appealing more to grown-ups, but the dialogue and ethnic-stereotype voice performances were a detraction.

Urther Rwafa has described the film as challenging and subverting Zimbabwe's political censorship.

== See also ==
- List of animated feature films
- List of stop-motion films
