= Mayfair Pumping Station =

Coordinates: 41°57′53″N 87°44′58″W

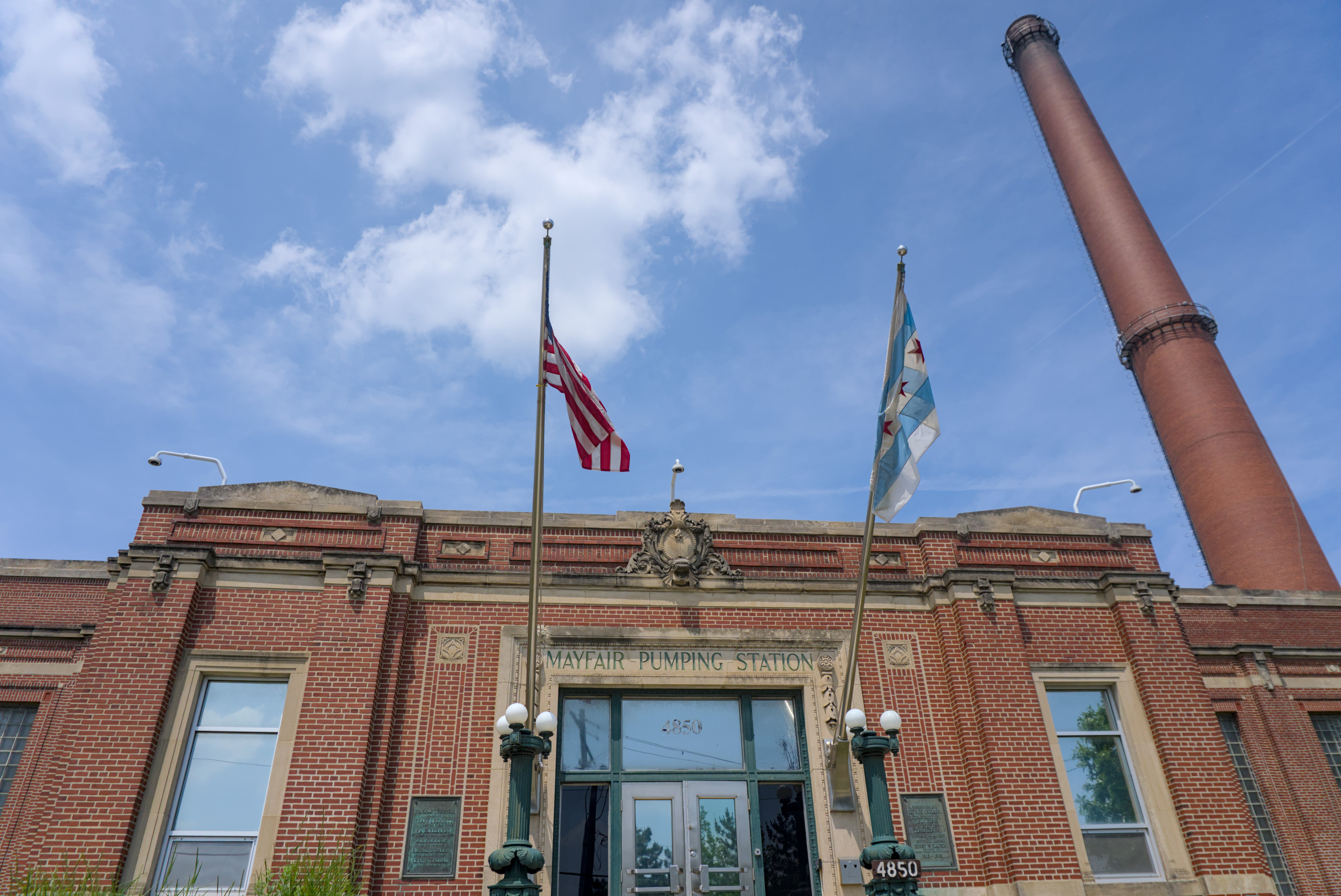
- Mayfair Pumping Station in 2025
- Interactive map of the Mayfair Pumping Station area

General information
- Location: Chicago, Illinois, U.S.
- Completed: 1918
- Cost: $5,416,000
- Owner: City of Chicago

Website
- www.chicago.gov/city/en.html

The Mayfair Pumping Station is a structure on the northwest side of Chicago, located at 4850 W. Wilson Avenue.

== History ==
Water began to be pumped from the Chicago River as early as 1803. By the late 19th century, it became clear that an organized water distribution system was needed.In 1918, the Mayfair pumping station was constructed to add pumping capacity to Chicago's water system. The station was constructed on the former farmland of Elsie Budlong, owner of the Budlong pickle factory (see Budlong Woods, Chicago). The station had a rather modest start as single steam-driven pumping station, with a team of horses available to step in with the frequent breakdown of the single steam pump.

=== The 1920s and early 1930s ===
Many residents in Chicago's North Side frequently complained of the lack of water. Fearing a repeat of the Great Chicago Fire, the residents nominated a local resident, Arne Ziegler of Chicago's Sauganash neighborhood, to lead a delegation to Springfield, Illinois. Meeting first with Republican governor Len Small and subsequently Republican governor Louis L. Emmerson, the Ziegler delegation made progress in securing funding for upgrading the station.

=== The Horner administration ===
Democratic governor Henry Horner, a supporter of Downstate causes, blocked the Mayfair upgrades, famously declaring that the "wealthy Chicagoans can afford their own water." With this, upgrading of the station was stalled. It was only until the administration of Dwight H. Green that the station became upgraded.

=== The 1950s ===
Construction of the Northwest Expressway (now known as the Kennedy Expressway) in the mid-1950s required substantial relocation of sewer lines around the new thoroughfare. The Mayfair pumping station presented an additional engineering dilemma since these new sewers needed to go either under or over the large water mains that serve the station. An underground bridge, covered with earth fill, was constructed over the mains to carry the sewer lines.

Many of Chicago's surrounding suburbs, in particular Niles, Illinois and Morton Grove, Illinois, were in a period of rapid growth and required increasing amounts of water. After protracted battles with the City of Chicago Water Department, the Supreme Court of Illinois ruled in 1957 that Chicago was required under the Illinois Constitution and certain intergovernmental contracts to supply water. This ruling paved the way for the development of these municipalities and for the growth of the Chicago metropolitan area generally north of Irving Park Road and west of Harlem Avenue.

The court's decision was vindicated when the 1961 Des Plaines, Illinois fire at Sears, Roebuck was able to be extinguished quickly with available hydrant pressure, thus avoiding loss of life and significant property damage. Mayor Richard J. Daley, recognizing the significance of the station in this respect, commemorated the station in a 1962 Chicago City Council resolution.

=== 1998 survey ===
The U.S. Water Conservation Laboratory completed a technical survey of water withdrawal from the station, finding the water quality and efficiency of pumping to be significantly above average for all U.S. pumping stations, including much newer facilities.

=== 21st century ===
The station serves most of the northwest side of Chicago and several surrounding suburbs that purchase water from Chicago. Seven steam driven pumps are used to pump water.

The venturis at the station do not have bronze throat-liners, unlike those at other Chicago-area pumping stations, but this is not reported to be a problem (B. Whalin, USDA-ARS Water Conservation Laboratory, written communication, October 11, 2000).

== Controversy ==
Scandal erupted in the late 1990s when a former employee of the Mayfair Pumping Station alleged a failure to be promoted because of his lack of ties to the Democratic party. In an emotional decision, the dismissal of the employee's complaint was affirmed by the United States Court of Appeals for the Seventh Circuit.
