= Edwina Spicer =

Zimbabwean journalist & documentary filmmaker (born 1948)

- Born: 1948 (age 77–78); Belfast, Northern Ireland
- Occupations: journalist and documentary filmmaker
- Notable work: Biko, Breaking the Silence, 1987; No Need to Blame, 1993; A Place for Everybody, 1993; Keeping a Live Voice: 15 Years of Democracy in Zimbabwe, 1995; Dancing out of Tune: a History of the Media in Zimbabwe, 1999; Never the Same Again: Zimbabwe's Growth Towards Democracy 1980-2000, 2000

Edwina Spicer (born 1948) is a Zimbabwean journalist and documentary filmmaker.

== Life ==
Spicer was born in 1948 in Belfast.

Spicer benefited from the growth of independent production companies in Zimbabwe between 1980 and 1995. Her documentaries have received funding from international donors and the Catholic Commission for Justice and Peace in Zimbabwe.

Spicer's 1987 documentary Bilo – Breaking the Silence was the first mini-feature to be shot in Zimbabwe. In 1988, despite financial backing, political opposition in Zimbabwe blocked her from completing a documentary on AIDS, Aids – The Killer Disease.

In January 2002, Spicer's son, an MDC activist, was tied to a tree, beaten and arrested for kidnapping. The following month Spicer's home was searched by police, and her husband was also arrested and detained. Spicer herself was detained by police after filming the MDC leader Morgan Tsvangarai in Harare.

== Films ==
- Biko, Breaking the Silence, 1987
- No Need to Blame, 1993
- A Place for Everybody, 1993
- Keeping a Live Voice: 15 Years of Democracy in Zimbabwe, 1995
- Dancing out of Tune: a History of the Media in Zimbabwe, 1999
- Never the Same Again: Zimbabwe's Growth Towards Democracy 1980-2000, 2000
