= Joe Njagu =

Zimbabwean filmmaker

- Born: 1982; Zimbabwe
- Education: Cambridge College
- Occupations: Film producer; Film director; Screenwriter
- Years active: 2010–present
- Organizations: Thinking Films
- Known for: The Gentleman, Cook Off, Rise
- Awards: Best Director – International American Film Festival (2012); National Arts Merit Awards – Legends Awards (2021)

Joe Njagu is a Zimbabwean film producer and director. He is known for directing The Gentleman, producing Cook Off, the first Zimbabwean feature film distributed on Netflix, and producing the short film Rise, the first Zimbabwean film to premiere at the Tribeca Festival.

Njagu has received recognition from regional and international organisations, including the Young African Leaders Initiative and the National Arts Merit Awards.

== Career ==
Njagu’s entry into filmmaking followed an early career outside the film industry at Fidelity Printers. He later worked as an extra on film productions in Botswana before making his directorial debut with the feature film Lobola in 2010. He subsequently co-founded the production company Thinking Films with UK-based film academic and filmmaker Agnieszka Piotrowska. Through the company, he worked on film projects produced in Zimbabwe and the United Kingdom. In 2012, Njagu received the Best Director Award at the International American Film Festival for his feature film The Gentleman.

In 2014, he collaborated with Piotrowska as co-producer and director of photography on an experimental drama documentary shot in Zimbabwe. The film was connected to the stage play Lovers in Time, which Piotrowska produced and directed for the Harare International Festival of the Arts in May 2014.

In 2017, Njagu produced Cook Off, which follows a single mother who enters a cooking competition. The film was produced on a limited budget and completed using deferred payment arrangements with cast, crew, and service providers. After screening at several film festivals including Cook Off was acquired by Netflix, becoming the first Zimbabwean feature film to be distributed on the platform. According to Njagu, the film was developed to present a contemporary Zimbabwean story centered on everyday life rather than crisis-focused narratives.

In 2020, Njagu produced the film Mirage, which received a nomination at the African Movie Academy Awards. In 2024, Njagu participated in the Pan African Film Festival in Los Angeles, United States, with the screening of his film Ngoda. He appeared at the festival alongside filmmaker Malaika Mushandu.

In 2025, Njagu served as a producer on the short film Rise. The film premiered at the Tribeca Festival in New York City, becoming the first Zimbabwean film to be selected for the festival.

== Awards and recognition ==
In 2012, Njagu was named among the Top 35 Under 35 Young African Leaders in International Affairs in the media category by the South African non-governmental organization Young People in International Affairs.

He is an alumnus of the 2016 Young African Leaders Initiative and was a Mandela Washington Fellow, during which he attended Cambridge College in Boston, United States.

In 2021, Njagu was recognized in the film category of the National Arts Merit Awards Legends Awards, which honored artists selected by a jury representing arts associations across Zimbabwe.

== Selected filmography ==
Year	Film	Role	Genre
2010	Lobola	Writer, Director, Executive Producer	Feature Film
2011	The Gentleman	Writer, Director, Producer	Feature Film
2017	Cook Off	Producer	Feature Film
2019	The Letter	Writer, Director, Producer, Executive Producer	Feature Film
2020	Mirage	Writer, Producer, Executive Producer	Feature Film
2023	Ngoda	Writer, Director, Producer	Feature Film
2025	Rise	Producer	Feature Film
