= Battle of the Chefs: Harare =

- Genre: Reality competition; Cooking show
- Presented by: Joseph Bunga (season 1); Zihlo (season 2–)
- Judges: Stephen Hyde; Cherylyn Conlon; Innocent Masuku; Lincoln Myambo (season 1–3); Tafadzwa Anifasi (season 3–); Karl Eckard (season 1-3); Karen Mutasa (season 3–); Rumbie Shoko (season 3–)
- Country of origin: Zimbabwe
- Original language: English
- No. of seasons: 3
- No. of episodes: 41

Production
- Executive producers: Joseph Bunga; Veronica Bunga
- Running time: 45 minutes
- Production company: Area 46 Productions

Original release
- Network: Zimbabwe Broadcasting Corporation
- Release: August 30, 2015 – present

Battle of the Chefs: Harare is a Zimbabwean reality competition television series which premiered on August 30, 2015 on Zimbabwe Broadcasting Corporation. The show features sixteen contestants competing across five rounds. It is open to both amateur and professional chefs.

== Show format ==
=== Basic format ===
Battle of the Chefs is a cooking show that uses a progressive elimination format. From season 2 onwards, each season starts with sixteen contestants, with one chef eliminated in each episode until four finalists remain to battle for the title of Best Chef in Zimbabwe.

Each episode features three challenges designed to test the chefs' technique, creativity, and knowledge of food and flavour. The expert panel of three judges score the chefs' efforts during the episodes. In the end the chef with the highest score wins either an advantage or a prize; and the chef with the lowest score is stripped of their chef's jacket.

In the Technical Challenge the chefs are asked to produce their take on a basic dish. In the Innovation Challenge, they are given a basket containing three key ingredients they must use to create their most innovative dish. In the Set Recipe Challenge they are given a somewhat complex recipe to follow.

=== Variant formats ===
Season 1 of the show had sixteen teams, each consisting of two individuals. In each episode, a team of chefs is required to prepare three dishes: starter, main course and dessert.

In season 2 onwards the Judges Masterclass Round features an Identification Challenge where the chefs are expected to identify a number of mystery ingredients, as well as the Replication Challenge where the chefs must watch one of the judges give a recipe demo and then replicate it. In the Semifinal Round there is a Shopping Challenge, and the Innovation Challenge requires the chefs to produce a creative platter of multiple items. The finale requires the chefs to produce a signature three course menu.

== Seasons ==
Season	Winner(s)	Runner(s)-up	Finalists	Air Dates
1	Tafadzwa Anifasi Musodzi Mushonga	Ant Berens Tony Attwell	N/A	August 30 - December 6, 2015
2	Leandrah Makaya	Jessica Vakos-England	Tinotenda Mutamba Donovan Layton	April 10 - July 3, 2016
3	Dylan Taylor	Carmen Vlahakis	Cherron Harry Wilson Jamesom	April 20 - July 13, 2017

=== Season 1 (2015) ===
==== Episodes ====
Episode	Air Date
1	30 August 2015
2	6 September 2015
3	13 September 2015
4	20 September 2015
5	27 September 2015
6	4 October 2015
7	11 October 2015
8	18 October 2015
9	25 October 2015
10	1 November 2015
11	8 November 2015
12	15 November 2015
13	22 November 2015
14	29 November 2015
15	6 December 2015

=== Season 2 (2016) ===
Season 2 was shot in a custom built studio in Borrowdale - Harare.

Naming sponsor - TM Pick n Pay

==== Contestant Progress ====
Contestant	1	2	3	4	5	6	7	8	9	10	11	12	13
Leandrah Makaya			SAFE		SAFE				SAFE		SAFE		Winner
Jessica Vakos-England			SAFE				SAFE	SAFE			SAFE		Runner-up
Tinotenda Mutamba	SAFE						SAFE	SAFE				SAFE	Eliminated
Donovan Layton		SAFE				SAFE			SAFE			SAFE	Eliminated
Sara Thompson		SAFE			ELIM					WIN		ELIM	
David Lupenga*	SAFE				SAFE							ELIM	
Fadzayi Mtuwa		SAFE			SAFE				SAFE		ELIM		
James Chareka	SAFE					SAFE		SAFE			ELIM		
Dimitri Adamakos			SAFE				SAFE		ELIM				
Zandi Mubi				SAFE		SAFE		ELIM					
Charlene Chisvo				SAFE			ELIM			OUT			
Tongai Zhou				SAFE		ELIM							
Tinashe Sean Murove				ELIM									
Rakesh Pokhriyal			ELIM							OUT			
Ryan Maidwell		ELIM								OUT			
Portia Makwamanzi	ELIM												

==== Episodes ====
ROUND ONE: GLOBAL CUISINE
Episode #	Episode Title	Contestants	Technical Challenge	Innovation Challenge	Set Recipe Challenge
201	"Mexican Fiesta"	David James Tinotenda Portia	Tortilla Chips with Salsa & Guacamole	Beef Mince Corn on the Cob Tequila	Molé Chicken Enchiladas
202	"Indian Adventure"	Donovan Fadzayi Sara Ryan	Chilli Sauce	Mutton Chops Chick Peas Cream Cheese	Ras Malai
203	"Classic French"	Jessica Dimitri Leandrah Rakesh	French Trim a Rack of Lamb	Rack of Lamb Camembert Cheese Sun Jam	Mille-Feuille
204	"Greek Games"	Charlene Zandi Tongai Tinashe	Pita Bread Dough	Pita Bread Dough Sardines Capers	Baba Ganouch Skordalia Tzatziki
ROUND TWO: JUDGE'S MASTERCLASS
Episode #	Episode Title	Contestants	Judge	Technical Challenge	Replication Challenge
205	"African Fusion Masterclass"	David Leandrah Fadzayi Sara	Innocent Masuku	Debone Whole Rabbit	Rabbit Roulade with Peanutbutter Sauce
206	"South East Asian Masterclass"	Donovan James Zandi Tongai	Cherylyn Conlon	Knife Skills	Thai Green Prawn Curry
207	"Game Masterclass"	Jessica Dimitri Tinotenda Charlene	Lincoln Myambo	Breakdown Guinea Fowl & Debone Thighs	Guinea Fowl Ballantine with Parsnip-Pea Mash & Tarragon Sauce
ROUND THREE: CLOSE TO HOME
Episode #	Episode Title	Contestants	Technical Challenge	Innovation Challenge	Set Recipe Challenge
208	"Contemporary Zimbabwean	James Tinotenda Jessica Zandi	Marula Nut & Baobab Powder Smoothie	Mopani Worms (Madora) Mango Rape	Pumpkin Leaf Ravioli
209	"Hunter Gatherer"	Leandrah Donovan Fadzayi Dimitri	Go Fishing & Foraging	Whole Bream Pecan Nuts Fresh Herbs	Mini Salted Caramel Pecan Tarts
210	"Wildcard Battle"	Sara Ryan Charlene Rakesh	Mayonnaise	Most Innovative Chicken Main Course	Chocolate Soufflé
ROUND FOUR: SEMIFINALS
Episode #	Episode Title	Contestants	Shopping Challenge	Technical Challenge	Innovation Challenge
211	"Contemporary High Tea"	Jessica Leandrah Fadzayi James	30 minutes & $100 to shop for ingredients at TM Pick n Pay	Scones	High Tea Finger Food Platter
212	"Pub Grub"	Tinotenda Donovan Sara David	30 minutes & $100 to shop for ingredients at TM Pick n Pay	Sausages	Pub Grub Platter
ROUND FIVE: FINAL
Episode #	Episode Title	Contestants	Starter	Main	Dessert
213	"Grand Finale"	Leandrah Jessica Tinotenda Donnovan	Stuffed Pumpkin Leaf Tian of Salmon Tartar Pan Fried Tilapia with Spatzle Sundried Tomato Tortelini	Fig & Hazelnut Pork Roulade with Potato Spiral Poached Bream with Salmon Mousse & Beurre Blanc Beef Fillet with Cabbage & a Red Wine Sauce Herb Crusted Beef Fillet with Tangy Mushroom Sauce	Eton Mess Chocolate Cheesecake Mousse Vanilla Ravioli with Strawberry Broth Decadent Choc Brownie

=== Season 3 (2017) ===
Season 3 was shot in a custom built studio in Msasa, Harare

Naming sponsor - TM Pick n Pay

==== Contestants ====
Contestant	1	2	3	4	5	6	7	8	9	10	11	12	13
Dylan Taylor				LOW			HIGH	LOW				HIGH	Winner
Carmen Vlahakis				WIN			LOW		WIN			WIN	Runner-up
Cherron Harry		WIN				WIN		WIN			WIN		2nd Runner-up(s)
Wilson Jameson	HIGH						WIN		LOW		HIGH		2nd Runner-up(s)
Ednos Tavirima			HIGH			LOW			HIGH			ELIM	
Chengetai Makawa*			WIN		WIN							ELIM	
Tatenda Nyamande	WIN				HIGH			HIGH			ELIM		
Kendall de Souza		LOW			ELIM					WIN	ELIM		
Tatenda Gudu				HIGH		HIGH			ELIM				
Kundai Muchanyuka		HIGH			LOW			ELIM					
Sue Hodgson			LOW				ELIM			OUT			
Nicola 'Cola' Kagoro	LOW					ELIM				OUT			
Pam Taiirodza				ELIM						OUT			
Deevya Lethwala			ELIM										
Caroline Ruzario		ELIM											
Amanda Mhundwa	ELIM												

==== Episodes ====
ROUND ONE: GLOBAL CUISINE
Episode #	Episode Title	Contestants	Technical Challenge	Innovation Challenge	Set Recipe Challenge
301	"Americana Extravaganza"	Tatenda N Wilson Cola Amanda	Cheeseburger & Fries	Chicken Wings Potato Chips Cola	Mini Apple Pies with Caramel Butternut Pastry Cream
302	"Chinese Festival"	Cherron Kundai Kendall Caroline	Vegetable Stir Fry with Egg Fried Rice	Eggplant Bamboo Shoots Green Tea	Pot Sticker Dumplings
303	"Italian Escapade"	Chengetai Ednos Sue Deevya	Fresh Pasta with a sauce	Salami Focaccia Coffee Grounds	Zabaglione with Ladyfingers
304	"Food on the Flame"	Carmen Tatenda G Dylan Pam	Open Fire Bread	Braai Pack Dry Spice Rub Pineapple	Grilled Orange Cupcakes
ROUND TWO: JUDGE'S MASTERCLASS
Episode #	Episode Title	Contestants	Identification Challenge	Technical Challenge	Replication Challenge
305	"Judge Steve's Beef Masterclass"	Chengetai Tatenda N Kundai Kendall	Flavoured Jellies	Prepare Beef Fillets	Beef Tournedo with Fondant Butternut & Smoked Garlic Mash
306	"Judge Taf's Fish Masterclass"	Cherron Tatenda G Ednos Cola	Unusual Ingredients by Sight	Scale & Fillet Whole Fish	Kapenta Rubbed Bream Fillet on Irio & Orange Burnt Butter
307	"Judge Steve's Dessert Masterclass"	Wilson Dylan Carmen Sue	Blindfolded	Prepare Sugar Work	Chocolate Delice with Honeycomb & Sugar Work
ROUND THREE: CLOSE TO HOME
Episode #	Episode Title	Contestants	Technical Challenge	Innovation Challenge	Set Recipe Challenge
308	"Zimbabwean Homecoming"	Cherron Tatenda N Dylan Kundai	Sadza & Relish	Kapenta (Fresh & Dried) Maputi Sweet Potato	Mopani Worm (Madora) Quiche
309	"South African Soiree"	Carmen Ednos Wilson Tatenda G	Boerewors	Rusks Peach Chutney Rooibos Tea	Bunny Chow
310	"Wildcard Battle"	Kendall Cola Sue Pam	Paté	Trio of Offal hors d'ourves	Humble Pie
ROUND FOUR: SEMIFINALS
Episode #	Episode Title	Contestants	Shopping Challenge	Technical Challenge	Innovation Challenge
311	"Band of Braaiers"	Cherron Wilson Tatenda N Kendall	20 minutes & $75 to shop for ingredients at TM Pick n Pay	Signature Gourmet Vodka Cocktail	Braai Platter of at least 6 unique items
312	"Fine Dining Collective"	Carmen Dylan Ednos Chengetai	20 minutes & $75 to shop for ingredients at TM Pick n Pay	Signature Gourmet Vodka Cocktail	Fine Dining Platter of at least 6 unique items
ROUND FIVE: FINAL
Episode #	Episode Title	Contestants	Starter	Main	Dessert
313	"Grand Finale"	Dylan Carmen Cherron Wilson	Bouillabaisse Duck Salad with Plums Sweet Potato Maple Bacon Soup Rosemary Beef Fillet	Beef with Mushrooms & Carrot Butternut Puree Pasta Verde with Creamy Prawns Chicken Curry with Banana Raita & Spiced Rice Grilled Chicken Thighs with Assorted Purees	Beetroot Sorbet Chocolate Tartlet with Coffee Mousse Date Pudding Mess in a Glass

=== Season 4 ===
The show's fourth season began pre-production in 2018 - with auditions taking place in August. However, following the renewed economic crisis in Zimbabwe, production was put on hold indefinitely.

== Judges ==
Judging is done by consensus among a panel of experts selected from Zimbabwe's hospitality industry, the majority of whom are restaurant owners, consultants, and executive chefs with hospitality background and experience.

Judge	Title	Organisation	Appearances
Stephen Hyde	Executive chef	Emmanuel's	Seasons 1-3 (26 episodes)
Cherylyn Conlon	Cooking instructor & restaurant consultant		Seasons 1-3 (22 episodes)
Innocent Masuku	Executive chef & restaurant consultant		Seasons 1-3 (20 episodes)
Lincoln Myambo	Consultant chef		Seasons 1-3 (19 episodes)
Tafadzwa Anifasi	Private chef		Season 3 (7 episodes)
Karl Eckard	Chef & restaurant owner	The Pariah State Group	Seasons 1-3 (6 episodes)
Karen Mutasa	Chef & restaurant owner	Organikks	Season 3 (3 episodes)
Carl Joshua Ncube	Comedian	Cotton Country Inn	Season 1 (2 episodes)
Douglas Chareka	Executive chef	Bronte Hotel	Season 1 (2 episodes)
Joseph Bunga	Executive Producer	Area 46 Productions	Seasons 2-3 (2 episodes)
Rumbie Shoko	Chef & founder	Zimbo Kitchen	Season 3 (2 episodes)
Lesley Orford	Chef & restaurant owner	Alo Alo Restaurant	Season 1 (1 episode)
Sebastian Benning	Restaurant owner	The Glass House	Season 1 (1 episode)
Tecla Mapota	Legal practitioner	Gwaunza & Mapota	Season 1 (1 episode)
Glenn Stutchbury	CEO	Cresta Hotel Africa	Season 1 (1 episode)
Emma Hacker	Food service representative	Sea Pride Zimbabwe	Season 1 (1 episode)
Roy Lumsden	Executive development chef	Meikles Africa	Season 1 (1 episode)
Mario Da Silva	Food critic		Season 1 (1 episode)
Tawanda Muchineripi	Restaurant owner	Belcantos	Season 1 (1 episode)

== Chefs' Competitions (off season/offline) ==
The inaugural Chefs' Competition in association with Battle of the Chefs was held on 5 August 2017. The following chefs competed:

Name	Organisation
Tinashe Sibanda	Towers
Lesley Chiremba	Alo-Alo
Romeo S Mandizha	Delhi Palace
Lyoid Kofi	Bronte
Webster Mupingo	Bronte
Jannet Banda	Oasis
Jessie Chivhunga	Cresta Lodge
Portia Murungweni	Cresta Lodge

A similar event was held featuring journalists in the Media Cook Off on 9 August 2017, hosted by season 3 finalist Cherron Harry.

== See also ==
Iron Chef
