= Kushata Kwemoyo =

2018 film by Shem Zemura

- Directed by: Shem Zemura
- Written by: Amanda Ranganawa
- Produced by: Shem Zemura
- Starring: Kudzai Msungo; Charles Muzemba; Gamuchirai Duve
- Cinematography: Shem Zemura
- Edited by: Shem Zemura; Ashley Savanhu
- Music by: Nigel Nyangombe
- Production company: Rain Media
- Distributed by: Shem Zemura Investments
- Release date: 22 February 2018
- Running time: 104 minutes
- Country: Zimbabwe
- Language: Shona

Kushata Kwemoyo is a 2018 Zimbabwean drama film produced and directed by Shem Zemura. The film stars Kudzai Msungo, Charles Muzemba and Gamuchirai Duve in the main lead roles. The film was set in the backdrop of communal lands of Murewa and Harare's affluent suburbs.

== Synopsis ==
Chiedza (Gamuchirai Duve) who was abused during her childhood by her step-mother later becomes a rough and tough woman who hates her family.

== Cast ==
- Kudzai Msungo as Pedzisai
- Charles Muzemba as Baba Sean
- Gamuchirai Duve as Chiedza
- Alaika Bhasikoro as Mai Pedzisai
- Elijah Madzikatire as Baba Pedzisai

== Release ==
The film was first premiered on 22 February 2018 in Zimbabwe. It was also screened at few international film festivals. The film was screened at the 2019 Zimbabwe International Film Festival. It won Best Southern African film at the 2021 Sotambe International Film and Arts Festival in Zambia.

The film was also chosen as one of the African films to be streamed via Mnet Afro-Cinema, a pop-up channel which was launched by MultiChoice in order to showcase and celebrate the contemporary African films during the COVID-19 pandemic. It was supposed to be streamed on 26 May 2021 as part of MultiChoice's Africa Day celebration week but had it to be postponed due to technical faults.

== Awards and nominations ==
The film received few awards and nominations at film festivals.

Year	Award	Category	Result
2018	National Art Merits Awards	Best Feature Film	Won
2018	National Art Merits Awards	Best Actor	Won
2018	National Art Merits Awards	Outstanding Screen Production	Won
2019	Lake International Pan African Film Festival	Best Feature Film	Nominated
		Best Actress	Nominated
		Best Editing	Nominated
2021	Sotambe International Film Festival and Arts Festival	Best Southern African Feature Film	Won
