= Miss Chindiya =

Zimbabwean influencer

Michelina Chindiya (born 18 December 1993), popularly known as Miss Chindiya, is a Zimbabwean fitness professional, maternal health advocate, and public speaker.. She was listed in Zimbabwe's 50 under 30 Emerging Leaders Class of 2021 and 50 Young Pace Setters of Zimbabwe in 2021. In 2025, she was formally recognized

by the Zimbabwe Healthcare Brand Awards for her contributions to the national fitness industry.

== Early life ==
Michelina was born in Harare, Zimbabwe. She did her secondary education at the Dominican Convent High School in Harare. In 2015 she completed her tertiary education at the University of Essex in the United Kingdom and returned to Zimbabwe shortly after.

== Career ==
Michelina Chindiya began her professional life in private wealth management before transitioning into the health and wellness sector. Chindiya is an economic contributor for the BBC UK and BBC Africa. In 2018 she contributed financial insights to BBC's flag ship show “Focus On Africa of Zimbabwean Finance Minister, Mthuli Ncube’s maiden Annual National Budget, the first ever national budget after Robert Mugabe’s reign. She has been interviewed on various radio stations to share her financial insights on the Zimbabwean economic situation, SAfm, Channel Africa (July 2019), ZiFM (March 2020) and CapitalkFM (Sept 2021).

During her career, she has been appointed brand ambassador for Newlands Country Club (January 2020), Daisies Foundation (2020), she was the face of the annual Econet Victoria Falls Marathon (November 2020 – December 2020) and CIMAS’s national iGo wellness campaign (February 2021 - April 2021). She was also host for Stanbic Bank Zimbabwe Xpress Fitness programme.

She was featured on the cover of Prowl Magazine in March 2020 and DIVA’s Inc’s in April 2021 Issue. In June 2021 she was featured in BBC’s “What’s New” to discuss the realities of social media. She then featured in Women’s Health South Africa, GQ South Africa and Glamour South Africa, as one of 10 Zimbabwean creatives to look out for.

In October 2021 she was recognized by the University of Essex as one of their “Inspiring Black Alumni” in honour of Black History Month. She then went on to work with Facebook Africa on the rollout of their latest Reels Ads feature as part of their “Let’s Get Real About Reels” campaign, this was followed by an endorsement with Philips Africa in January 2022.

Chindiya is a founding program partner for Her Miles, Zimbabwe’s first all-female running series. As of early 2026, the initiative has registered over 2,200 participants.

As a speaker, her speaking engagements include Econet E-novate Expo (2025), Corporate Wellness Series and Bumps and Biceps.
