= Munya, Ghana =

Munya is a community in Tolon District in the Northern Region of Ghana.

== See also ==
- Suburbs of Tolon District
