= Gonarezhou (film) =

- Directed by: Sydney Taivavashe
- Starring: Tariro Mnangagwa, Tamy Moyo
- Release date: September 2019
- Country: Zimbabwe

Gonarezhou is a 2019 Zimbabwean anti-poaching awareness film written and directed by Sydney Taivavashe. The film was produced in conjunction with the Zimbabwe Parks and Wildlife Management Authority.

== Premise ==
The film is about a young man called Zulu who suffers various misfortunes and joins a poaching gang.

== Cast ==
- Tariro Mnangagwa as Sergeant Onai.
- Tamy Moyo as Sara.
- Tendaiishe Chitima as Thulo
- Tinashe Nhukarume as Schoolboy
- Eddie Sandifolo as Zulu

== Release ==
The film was released in 2019. Gonarezhou was shown at the 2020 Pan African Film Festival.

== Production ==
In 2017, Sydney announced that he was working on a feature film about poaching and that he started developing the script since 2013. The story was inspired by the killings of 300 elephants by poachers using cyanide in 2013. Principal Photography started in November 2018.
