= Ignatius Mabasa =

Ignatius Tirivangani Mabasa (born 1971) is a Zimbabwean writer, storyteller, and musician, who writes mainly in Shona.

Mabasa was born in Mount Darwin and grew up on his grandfather's farm there. He attended school in Chitungwiza, where he began to write short stories. He studied Shona and linguistics at the University of Zimbabwe. He was awarded a scholarship to attend the University of Oslo, where he received the M.Phil. in Media, Democracy and Development in 1998. The following year, he received a Fulbright Scholarship to teach writing and literature in Illinois. Mabasa is the first Zimbabwean to write a PhD thesis in Shona at Rhodes University, South Africa.

== Career ==
Mabasa's debut novel, the satirical Mapenzi (Fools), won first prize in the Zimbabwe Book Publishers’ Association Awards in 2000. His second novel Ndafa Here? (Am I Dead?) won the 2009 National Arts Merit Awards (NAMA) Outstanding Fiction Book as did his novel Imbwa yemunhu (You Dog) in 2014.

Mabasa has two published collections of poems in Shona: Tipeiwo Dariro and Muchinokoro Kunaka. His short stories include "Paying to Die" and "Some Kind of Madness".

Frequently performing as a storyteller in schools, Mabasa has written several children's books in English and Shona, including The Man, Shaggy Leopard and the Jackal; and other stories, which won the NAMA in 2010. His book Meri Nebhutsu Tsvuku was a NAMA nominee for Outstanding Children's Book in 2013.

In 2010, Mabasa was writer/storyteller in residence at the University of Manitoba in Canada. In 2012, he founded Bhabhu Books, which publishes novels and stories in Shona, Ndebele and other languages. He is one of the first Zimbabwean authors to publish e-books, citing piracy concerns, “No laws are protecting us as a sector. A few days after publishing a book, the pirated version is all over the streets."

== Bibliography ==
- Tipeiwo Dariro (1993)
- Mapenzi (1999)
- Muchinokoro Kunaka (2004)
- Ndafa Here? (2008)
- Imbwa yemunhu (2013)

== Relevant literature ==
- Veit-Wild, Flora. 2009. “Zimbolicious” – the creative potential of linguistic innovation: The case of Shona-English in Zimbabwe. Journal of South African Studies 35.3:683-697.
