= Mayfair Academy of Fine Arts =

Dance school in Chicago, Illinois, USA

Coordinates: 41.736878°N 87.577835°W

The Mayfair Academy of Fine Arts is a dance school located on the South Side of Chicago, Illinois. This dance school was founded in 1957 by tap dancer Tommy Sutton. It was created by Sutton to give young black children in the area the same opportunities that white children in that time period had. Mayfair's enrollment has increased from about 90 kids enrolled in classes at Mayfair to over 800 kids enrolled in classes at Mayfair. Mayfair has been operating for over 50 years now. Due to recent increase of violent crimes in the South Side area since July 2012, Peggy Sutton, who is Tommy Sutton's daughter and currently runs the dance school, is planning on moving the studio into the Calumet Heights area out of concern for the students' wellbeing. Mayfair moved to 8701 S. Bennett Ave. but ceased operations in 2021.
