= Something Nice from London =

2015 Zimbabwean British drama film

- Directed by: Nick Marcq
- Starring: Munya Chidzonga; Memory Busoso; Lovewell Chisango
- Distributed by: Latimer Films; British Council
- Release dates: October 2013 (British Council); 1 April 2015 (Zimbabwe)
- Running time: 60 minutes
- Country: Zimbabwe
- Languages: English; Shona

Something Nice from London is a 2013 Zimbabwean British drama film written by Petina Gappah and directed by Nick Marcq. The film stars Munya Chidzonga, Tonderai Munyebvu and Lovewell Chisango in the lead roles while Memory Busoso, Rambidzai Karize and Lauren Marshall play supportive roles. The film is titled ironically as its climax is linked with the untimely death of Peter who dies in London under mysterious circumstances. The film is a joint collaboration of Britain based Latimer Films and British Council. The movie is inspired and adapted from Petina Gappah's short story with the same title which was a part of the award-winning anthology An Elergy For Easterly. The film had its theatrical release on 1 April 2015 coinciding the April Fools' Day but it was screened in few film festivals in late 2013.

== Cast ==
- Munya Chidzonga as Jonathan
- Memory Busoso as Maimary
- Lovewell Chisango as Uncle Matyaya
- Rambidzai Karize as Mary
- Lauren Marshall as Lisa
- Tonderai Munyebvu as Peter
- Charles Mzembe as Boss Man Dentist
- Pretty Nxaba as Mailisa
- Eddie Sandifolo as Cargoman

== Plot ==
Tensions rise in Harare as the Chikwiro family await the arrival of their dead son Peter from London. Conflict arises on burying of Peter's body which turns out to be a chaos. Peter's mother insists to bury on a local cemetery but Matyaya and Jonathan are persuading other ideas to consider Shurugwi, the place where Peter's father was buried. Mary's cousin Lisa who is in England then informs the relatives of Peter in Harare that it could take another week to send the body.

== Filming ==
The film was mostly shot and set in Zimbabwe and few portions of the film were set in London.
