= Tanyaradzwa =

2005 Zimbabwean drama film

- Directed by: Tawanda Gunda Mupengo
- Starring: Tongayi Chirisa; Kudakwashe Maradzika; Tendai Musoni
- Release date: August 2005
- Running time: 70 minutes
- Country: Zimbabwe
- Languages: English; Shona

Tanyaradzwa is a 2005 Zimbabwean award-winning bilingual drama film written and directed by Tawanda Gunda Mupengo. The film stars Tongayi Chirisa, Kudakwashe Maradzika and Tendai Musoni in the lead roles. The title role is played by the lead actress Kudakwashe Maradzika. The film had its theatrical release in August 2005 and received positive reviews. It also received several awards and nominations.

== Cast ==
- Tongayi Chirisa
- Kudakwashe Maradzika
- Tendai Musoni
- Chamu Rice
- Tafadzwa Munyoro
- Rukudzo Chadzamira
- Emmanuel Mbirirmi
- Agnes Mupikata

== Plot ==
Tanyaradzwa (Kudakwashe Maradzika), an intelligent and charming 18 year old teenage girl who hails from a well to do family becomes pregnant at school and was guilty of preserving the secret of her pregnancy from her parents for nine months. She gives birth to a baby boy and after getting to know this, her parents feel ashamed and chases her away. Tanya then attempts to find the baby's father.

== Awards and nominations ==
The film was nominated in six categories at the 2006 Africa Movie Academy Awards and won the Award for the Best Cinematography and Tendai Musoni received the Award for Most Promising Actress.

Year	Award	Category	Result
2006	2nd Africa Movie Academy Awards	Best Soundtrack	Nominated
2006	2nd Africa Movie Academy Awards	Best Actor	Nominated
2006	2nd Africa Movie Academy Awards	Best Screenplay	Nominated
2006	2nd Africa Movie Academy Awards	Best Actress in Lead Role	Nominated
2006	2nd Africa Movie Academy Awards	Best Cinematography	Won
2006	2nd Africa Movie Academy Awards	Most Promising Actress	Won
