= Mayfair Hotel =

Mayfair Hotel or May Fair Hotel may refer to:

- The May Fair Hotel, London, England
- Mayfair Hotel, Adelaide, South Australia, a five-star hotel in a heritage building
- Mayfair Hotel (Los Angeles), on the National Register of Historic Places
- Mayfair Hotel (Searcy, Arkansas), on the National Register of Historic Places
- Mayfair Hotel (St. Louis, Missouri)
