= Roger Hawkins (film director) =

Zimbabwean director and film producer

- Born: Harare, Zimbabwe
- Education: University of Natal
- Occupations: Director; film producer
- Notable work: The Legend of the Sky Kingdom

Roger Hawkins is a Zimbabwean director and film producer best known for films such as The Legend of the Sky Kingdom (2003), The Silent Fall (2006) and The Lion of Judah (2009).

== Early life and career ==
Born and raised in Harare, Zimbabwe, Hawkins graduated with a BSc degree in agriculture from the University of Natal. After earning his BSc, he became a school teacher, advertising copywriter, fumigator, soil surveyor, research assistant, lounge pianist and landscape gardener. Hawkins resigned from his job as a math teacher in 1993 to pursue a career in the performing arts. He staged a musical he wrote and directed called The Singer. Following the success of The Singer, Hawkins produced the TV series Adventure Unlimited and the television film Choose Freedom. He studied directing at the Raindance Film Festival, an independent film school. Hawkins directed the 60-minute TV film Dr Juju, which was filmed in six days.

In 2003, Hawkins released his full-length animated feature film The Legend of the Sky Kingdom. It was made in Harare and pioneered a technique called "junkmation". The film was chosen among the top five of 1,300 entries at the World Animation Festival in France. Hawkins worked with fifteen people and spent four years making the film. The characters and sets in the film were made from discarded items such as car parts, tools, kitchen utensils, pipes and pieces of wood.

== Selected filmography ==
- The Legend of the Sky Kingdom (2003)
- The Silent Fall (2006)
- Chose Freedom
- Dr Juju
- The Lion of Judah (2009)
