= Munya Chidzonga =

Zimbabwean actor

- Born: Munya Chidzonga; 8 December 1983 (age 42); Harare, Zimbabwe
- Other name: Munya
- Education: University of Paris-Sud
- Occupations: Actor, filmmaker
- Children: 3

Munyaradzi "Munya" Chidzonga (born December 8, 1983) is a Zimbabwean actor. He first rose to prominence in 2008, with his appearance on the reality TV show Big Brother Africa representing Zimbabwe in its third season, in which he achieved third place. In 2010, he participated in the fifth season of Big Brother Africa, becoming runner-up losing to Uti Nwachukwu, the representative for Nigeria, who also contested in Season 3.

After the reality show, Munya went on to produce and act in the films Lobola (2010) and The Gentleman (2011) through his production company, Ivory Pictures. In 2012, he won a NAMA Award for the Most Outstanding Actor in the Film and Television category for his performance in the film The Gentleman. In 2014, Chidzonga starred in the third season of the South African comedy-drama show Mzansi Love, which was aired on e.tv and eKasi+.

== Early life and education ==
Chidzonga was born on 8 December 1985. For his secondary education, he attended Peterhouse Boys' School, an elite independent school just outside Marondera, where he was a prefect. He was hailed for his performance in a school play, "Absent Friends", in 2004. Munya was the first Petrean in the history of the school to receive a Drama award Colors for Drama.

Munya then went on to get a Bachelor of Arts degree in Motion Picture at The South African School of Motion Picture Medium and Live Performance in Cape Town, South Africa. Where he was nominated for best actor

== Personal life ==
Chidzonga married 2008 Idols East Africa finalist Adiona Maboreke at a private ceremony in Harare in 2012. Chidzonga and Maboreke had been dating since 2009 and had a son named Pfumai, born in 2010, prior to the marriage. The couple had a second son, named Diwai, born in 2015.

== Filmography ==
=== Films ===
Title	Year	Credited as			Notes	Ref.
		Actor	Producer	Role		
Lobola	2010	Yes	Yes	Sean Muza		
The Gentleman	2011	Yes	Yes	Tawana / Takunda		
Something Nice from London	2013	Yes		Jonathan		

=== Television ===
Title	Year	Role	Network	Notes	Ref.
Big Brother Africa 3	2008	Himself	Various	Period: 91 days Position: 3rd	
Big Brother Africa 5	2010	Himself	Various	Period: 91 days Position: 2nd	
Mzansi Love	2014	Mak	e.tv eKasi+	8 episodes	
Rhythm City	2016	The Angel	e.tv	20 episodes	
