= Thandie's Diary =

2018 Zimbabwean drama film

- Directed by: Eddie Ndhlovu
- Written by: Eddie Ndhlovu
- Produced by: Talent Chitauro
- Starring: Tariro Chitapi; Tinashe Pundo; Arnold Gara; Thabisile Mkandla; Fatima Makunganya; Jane Dembo
- Release date: August 2018 (Zimbabwe)
- Running time: 90 minutes
- Country: Zimbabwe
- Languages: Shona; English

Thandie's Diary is a 2018 Zimbabwean drama film directed by Eddie Ndhlovu and produced by Talent Chitauro. The film stars Tariro Chitapi in the lead role whereas Tinashe Pundo, Arnold Gara, Thabisile Mkandla, Fatima Makunganya and Jane Dembo made supportive roles. The film revolves around the story of Thandie who died accidentally and reveals her real life through a diary.

The film made its premier on 20 August 2021 at the Zambezi Magic. Even though the film was made as a home movie with a low budget, the film received mostly positive reviews from critics and screened world wide. The film was selected for screening at the three-day Nepal Africa Film Festival (NAFF) 2021 on April 23 at National Dance Hall in Kathmandu, Nepal. The film is now available in Digital Entertainment on Demand (DEOD) and most DEOD platforms including Botswana, Namibia and South Africa.

== Cast ==
- Tariro Chitapi
- Takura Murapa
- Arnold Gara
- Tinashe Pundo
- Gift Saidi
- Jane Dembo
- Thabisile Mkandla Khabo
- Zolile Makeleni
- Fatima Makunganya
