= Yellow Card (film) =

2000 Zimbabwean comedy romantic drama film

- Directed by: John Riber
- Written by: John Riber; Andrew Whaley
- Produced by: John Riber; Louise Riber
- Starring: Leroy Gopal; Kasamba Mkumba; Collin Sibangani Dube; Dumiso Gumede; Ratidzo Mambo; Kasamba Mkumba
- Cinematography: Sandi Sissel
- Edited by: Louise Riber
- Production company: Media for Development Trust
- Release date: 25 December 2000; (USA)
- Running time: 90 minutes
- Country: Zimbabwe
- Language: English

Yellow Card, is a 2000 Zimbabwean comedy romantic drama film directed by John Riber and produced by director himself with his wife Louise Riber. The film stars Leroy Gopal in the lead role whereas Kasamba Mkumba, Collin Sibangani Dube, Dumiso Gumede, Ratidzo Mambo and Kasamba Mkumba made supportive roles. The film revolves around a teenage soccer player who became a father after having unprotected sex. The film is related to the 1988 film Consequences, both produced by Riber, and both dealing with the consequences of teenage choices, specifically in the context of unprotected sex and teenage pregnancy.

The film was shot in Harare, Zimbabwe. The film made its premiere on 25 December 2000. The film received mixed reviews from critics.

== Plot ==
Twelve years after the events of Consequences, seventeen-year-old Tiyane—an aspiring football player—engages in a casual sexual encounter with Linda, a childhood friend who has long harboured feelings for him. Shortly thereafter, he becomes enamoured with Juliet, a spirited girl from an affluent, mixed-race background, whose self-restraint contrasts sharply with Linda’s impulsiveness. Tiyane's feelings for Juliet are reciprocated, and he abruptly distances himself from Linda, leaving her exploited. After she faints at school, Linda informs Tiyane that she is pregnant. Fearing that the scandal could jeopardise both his promising football career and his relationship with Linda, he denies paternity. His plans unravel months later when a mystery baby is left on his doorstep, and Linda—who had relocated following expulsion from school—confirms that Tiyane is the father. Forced to juggle the pressures of early parenthood, a rising football career, and a secret that could destroy his relationship with Juliet, Tiyane must face the truth and the responsibilities he has long tried to avoid.

== Cast ==
- Leroy Gopal as Tiyane Tsumba
- Kasamba Mkumba as Juliet Bester
- Lazarus Boora as Gringo
- Collin Sibangani Dube as Skido
- Dumiso Gumede as Coach
- Ratidzo Mambo as Linda Karombo
- Walter Muparutsa as Tiyane's Father
- Pelagia Viaji as Tiyane's Mother
- Yvette Ogiste-Muchenje as Rita
- Pedzisai Sithole as Nocks

== Production ==
Yvette Ogiste-Muchenje - Rita in the 1988 movie Consequences - reprises the role in Yellow Card, now teaching at the same school from which she had been expelled following her own teen pregnancy.
