= Mayfair Music Hall =

Music hall in Santa Monica, California, United States (1911–2010)

- Location within the Los Angeles metropolitan area
- 34°0′54″N 118°29′47″W

History
- Built: 1911

Site notes
- Architect: Henry C. Hollwedel

Santa Monica Historic Landmark
- Official name: Mayfair Theatre
- Designated: 11 July 1994

The Mayfair Music Hall was an English music hall-styled vaudeville theater devised and created by entrepreneur Milt Larsen, located in Santa Monica, California.

The theater was originally designed by architect Henry C. Hollwedel, and built in 1910 as the Santa Monica Opera House. On December 12, 1911, it opened under the new name Majestic Theater. When live shows proved unpopular, it featured silent movies and vaudeville acts. Milt Larsen transformed the venue into a Victorian music hall in 1972 and produced British variety shows there. In 1974, the theater was used to film the famous "Puttin' on the Ritz" sequence in Young Frankenstein. In 1974, it was used to film a scene for the pilot movie of The Rockford Files, which featured an acrobat and a dog act. In 1989, it housed the Los Angeles wing of The Second City comedy troupe. The theatre was damaged in the 1994 Northridge earthquake, and the owner gutted the building and removed all the ornate decor. As of 2019, the theater housed a Shoe Palace store.
