= Zimbabwe International Film Festival =

Zimbabwe International Film Festival (abbreviated as ZIFF) is an annual ten-day film festival held in Zimbabwe in August or September. Instituted in 1998, it is organised by the Zimbabwe International Film Festival Trust (ZIFFT), a non-profit organisation. The festival is a non-political competitive platform that provides a showcase of feature films, documentary films and short films, as well as providing workshops and other cultural events.
