= National Arts Merit Awards =

Annual arts awards

The National Arts Merit Awards (NAMA Awards) is a set of annual awards granted by the National Arts Council of Zimbabwe (NACZ) in recognition of outstanding achievements in the arts and culture.

The categories have differed over the years. In 2020, they were:

- Outstanding Newcomer
- Outstanding Female Musician
- Outstanding Male Musician
- Outstanding Song
- Outstanding Album
- Outstanding Music Video
- Outstanding Fiction Book
- Outstanding Children's Book
- Outstanding First Creative Published Book
- Outstanding Female Dance
- Outstanding Male Dancer
- Outstanding Actress
- Outstanding Screen Production (Television Series)
- Outstanding Screen Production – Short Film
- Outstanding Mix Media Work
- Outstanding 2 Dimensional Work
- Outstanding 3 Dimensional Work
- Outstanding Exhibition
- Outstanding Journalist (Print)
- Outstanding Journalist (TV)
- Outstanding Journalist Radio
- Outstanding Online Media
- Outstanding Comedian
- Outstanding Poet
- Outstanding Actor (Film and TV)
- Outstanding Actress (Film and TV)
- Outstanding Screen Production (TV)
- Outstanding Screen Production (Short Film)
- Outstanding Screen Production (Full-length Film)
- Outstanding Promoter of the Year
- Personality of the Year
- Service to the Arts Award
- Lifetime Achievement Award
- People's Choice Award

== Awards winners ==
=== 2020 ===
- Outstanding fiction book: Out of Darkness, Shining Light – Petina Gappah

=== 2010 ===
- Outstanding Fiction Book: The Fading Sun – David Mungoshi

=== 2009 ===
- Outstanding Fiction Book: Ndafa Here? – Ignatius Mabasa

=== 2008 ===
- Outstanding Fiction Book: The Uncertainty of Hope – Valerie Tagwira

=== 2007 ===
- Outstanding Fiction Book: Strife – Shimmer Chinodya

=== 2006 ===
- Outstanding Fiction: Totanga Patsva – Memory Chirere

=== 2005 ===
- Outstanding Fiction: Masimba – Chiedza Musengezi

=== 2004 ===
- Best Fiction Book: Noma Kanjani Kayiphele Linto! – Bekithemba Ncube

=== 2003 ===
- Best Written Work – Yvonne Vera

=== 2002 ===
- Best Written Work in any language: Umsebenzi Kawukho – N.C.G. Mathema
