= Mungoshi =

Mungoshi is a Zimbabwean surname. Notable people with the surname include:

- Charles Mungoshi (1947–2019), Zimbabwean writer
- David Mungoshi (1949–2020), Zimbabwean novelist, actor, poet and teacher
- Jesesi Mungoshi, Zimbabwean actress
