= Indi (surname) =

Indi is a surname, and may refer to:

- Bruno Martins Indi (born 1992), Dutch footballer
- John Indi (1953/1954–2024), Zimbabwean actor
- Kubi Indi, Zimbabwean activist and businesswoman

== See also ==
- Inda (surname)
