= Dominic Kanaventi =

Zimbabwean film and stage actor

- Born: Zimbabwe
- Occupation: Actor
- Years active: 1980s to present

Dominic Kanaventi is a Zimbabwean film and stage actor. He has appeared in Shamwari in 1982, Mandela, Cry Freedom in 1987 and The Midday Sun in 1989. He has had major roles in Neria, released in 1993 and Salone, released in 2016. He was also president of the Zimbabwe Actors Guild (ZAG).

== Background ==
Kanaventi started out as a stage actor. In the early years he was a member of the Catholic sponsored drama center, the Mabvuku Youth Center. In film, he had parts in Shamwari and Cry Freedom, both films in the 1980s. In 1992, he had a leading role in Neria, and by 2001, he had acted in 14 productions.

As of 1997, Kanaventi was the president of ZAG, which is the Zimbabwe Actors Guild. He has been outspoken about the exploitation of Zimbabwean actors and the disparity between them and their other counterparts.

In an interview with Alan Tempest for The Standard, he said that he had until January 2002 before he would be formally declared a stateless person. This apparently came about as Kanaventis father was born in Mozambique. He had walked all the way to Salisbury as it was called then, and married his mother. Kanaventi was born in October 1950. As a result of his statelessness, he emigrated to the United States in April 2002. He worked as a furniture salesman and car salesman and on the way became a US citizen in 2009. He also became a student and in December 2014, he completed his B.S. in Marketing Management. He then became the CEO of a consultancy firm.

== Career ==
=== Stage ===
As a stage actor, he along with Walter Muparutsa received the 1983 Best Actor Award for their work in the Andrew Whaley production, Platform Four. Other work includes working in collaboration with Ben Sibenke for a 1985 play. The play was Sizwe Banse is Dead, a well known Zimbabwe Arts Production. For the 1997 play Platform Five, which was a play about the tramps and their world in Harare around the station area, Kanaventi and Walter Muparutsa dressed like tramps and went into the area and interacted with the people there to get the feeling of what their life was about.

=== Film ===
He appeared in The Midday Sun which was released in 1989 and The Power of One which was released in 1992. In Neria, Kanaveti played Phineas, a greedy and nasty brother in law, who after his brother's death, makes his brother's widow suffer. His performance was noted in The Standard.

== Filmography (selective) ==
FilmsActor
Title	Role	Director	Year	Notes #
Shamwari	Guard force member	Clive Harding	1982	
Mandela	Organizer man	Philip Saville	1987	TV movie
Cry Freedom	Black frontier policeman	Richard Attenborough	1987	
The Midday Sun	Anthony Kacula	Lulu Keating	1989	
The Power of One		John G. Avildsen	1992	
Neria	Phineas	Godwin Mawuru	1993	
Salone	Loyola	Aswar Rahman	2016	

TelevisionActor
Title	Episode	Role	Director	Year	Notes #
Kongo	1959-1960	Partijman		1997	
The Knock	Episode #3.2	Kamano	Geoff Harris		
