= Pakare Paye Arts Centre =

Arts centre in Norton Town, Zimbabwe

- Interactive map of Pakare Paye Arts Centre
- Full name: Pakare Paye Arts Centre
- Coordinates: 17.87633°S 30.68845°E
- Owner: Oliver Mtukudzi
- Capacity: 3,200

Construction
- Built: 2004
- Opened: 3 November 2004; 21 years ago

Pakare Paye Arts Centre is one of the initiatives by late Zimbabwe's legendary musician Oliver Mtukudzi who was also known as Tuku.

The art centre was opened in 2004 on the 3rd of October and it is located in Norton town which is about 45 km (28 mi) from the capital city Harare. The place was once used as a warehouse.

The main features include Sam Mtukudzi Conference Centre named after his late son Sam (who died in 2011 in a car accident). There are restaurants, lodge, offices, as well as an open-air stage which can accommodate 3,000 people. The main hall is a 200 seater.

Some upcoming artists that were groomed at Pakare Paye include Mbeu, Innocent Mapemba, Gary Tight and Munyaradzi Matarutse.
