= Ind (surname) =

Ind is a surname, and may refer to:

- Alfred Ernest Ind (1872–1916), British Army soldier, recipient of the Victoria Cross
- Bill Ind (1942–2026), English Anglican bishop
- Peter Ind (1928–2021), British jazz double bassist
- Suttantaprija Ind (1859–1924), Khmer monk and poet

== See also ==
- Inda (surname)
- Indi (surname)
