= Gary Tight =

Zimbabwean musician (born 1994)

- Born: Gary Muponda; 2 December 1994 (age 31)
- Origin: Honde Valley, Mutare, Zimbabwe
- Genres: Afro-pop
- Occupations: Musician, Recording Artist
- Years active: 2005–present
- Label: Gary Tight Entertainment (current)

Gary Tight (born Gary Muponda in Mutare, Zimbabwe, 2 December 1994) is a Zimbabwean Afro-pop artist. He is the son of Zimbabwean Afro-Jazz musician Willom Tight. Tight rose to countrywide prominence as a mentee of Oliver Mtukudzi.

== Early life ==
Born in family of three, Tight's musical career started at Sunday School from the age of two with the encouragement of his father, Willom Tight. Tight completed his GCE Ordinary Level at Churchill Boys High School in Harare, Zimbabwe where he joined the school's Churchill Jazz Band.

== Musical career ==
In 2005, Tight had his first concert performance at the Artists Against Poverty Festival Campaign in Zimbabwe. In 2016, Tight performed at the late Sam Mtukudzi's tribute who was one of his musical influences. In 2017, Tight featured the late Dr Oliver Mtukudzi on his single 'Ndizarurire'. In December 2018, Tight was an opening act to Zimbabwean veteran musician Thomas Mapfumo's 'The Peace Tour.

== Discography ==
=== Singles ===
- Ndazonyara Featuring Jah Prayzah (2014)
- Ndizarurire Featuring Oliver Mtukudzi (2017)
- Vanhu Vatema Remix (2018)
- Ndiwe (2018)
- Chingoma Featuring Stunner (2018)
- Mweya Wakanaka Oliver Mtukudzi Tribute (2019)
- Tsitsi Rudo (2019)
- Ganyamatope (2019)

== Personal life ==
Tight was raised in a musical environment since childhood. Inspired by Sam Mtukudzi's sound he has been tipped by many as the chosen one to carry on the Tuku Jazz Music Legacy.
