= List of awards and nominations received by Danny Glover =

Danny Glover awards and nominations
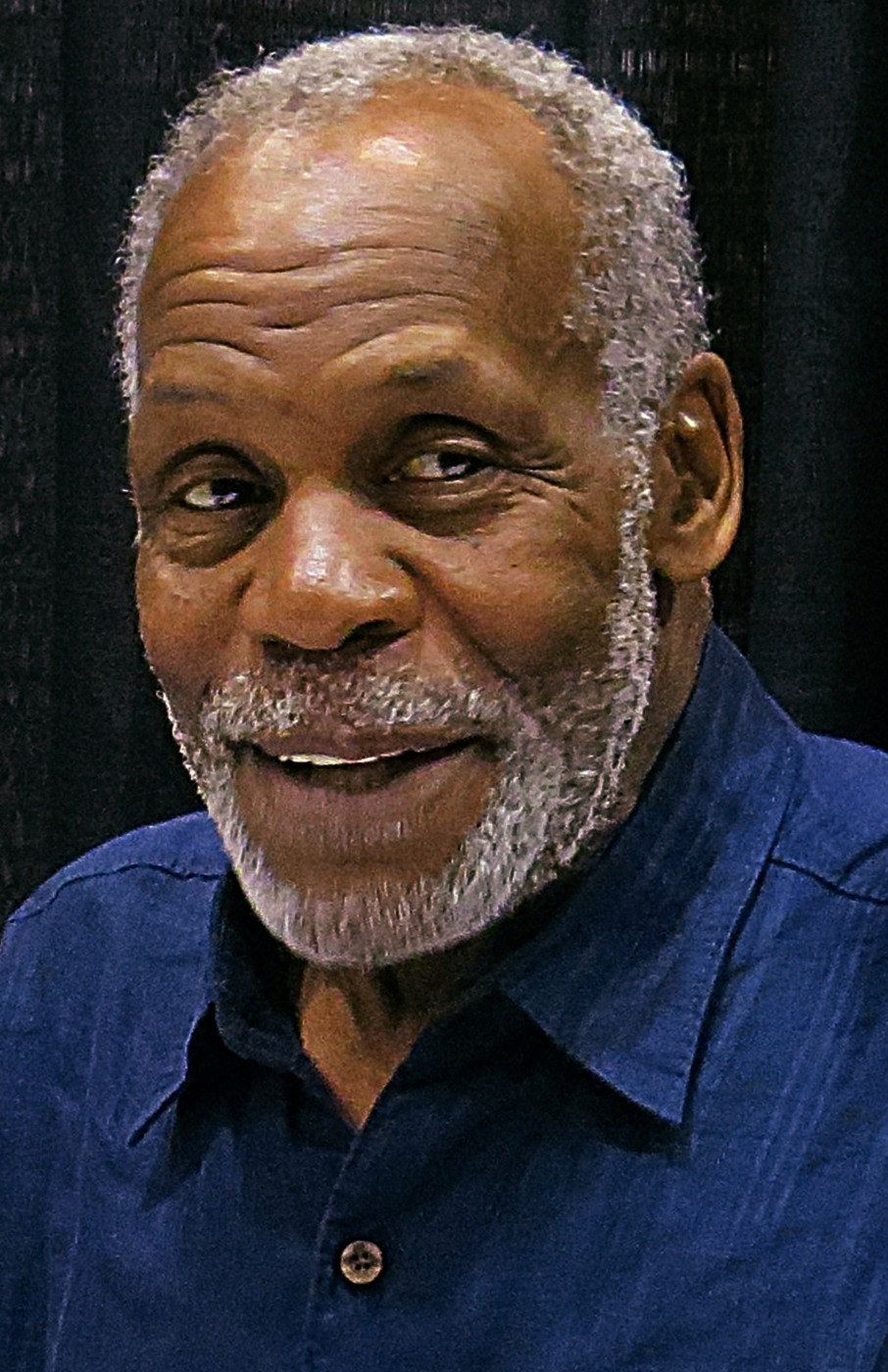
- Glover in 2014
Awards and nominations
| Award | Wins | Nominations |
| Grammy | 0 | 4 |
| Academy Awards | 1 | 1 |
| Emmy Awards | 0 | 5 |
| Screen Actors Guild Awards | 0 | 2 |

The following is a list of awards and nominations received by American actor Danny Glover.

Glover is an actor of film, television and theatre. He has received four Primetime Emmy Award nominations for his performances in Mandela (1988), Loneseome Dove (1989), Fallen Angels (1996), and Freedom Song (2000). He also earned two Screen Actors Guild Award nominations for Outstanding Actor in a Miniseries or Movie for Fallen Angels (2000) and for Outstanding Ensemble Cast in a Motion Picture for Dreamgirls (2006). In 1991 he earned an Independent Spirit Award for his performance in To Sleep with Anger.

In 2021, it was announced by the Board of the Academy of Motion Picture Arts and Sciences that he would receive the Jean Hersholt Humanitarian Award for "[his] decades-long advocacy for justice and human rights reflects his dedication to recognizing our shared humanity on and off the screen".

== Major associations ==
=== Academy Awards ===
| Year | Category | Nominated work | Result | Ref. |
|---|---|---|---|---|
| 2021 | Jean Hersholt Humanitarian Award | Himself | Won | |

=== Emmy Awards ===
| Year | Category | Nominated work | Result | Ref. |
Primetime Emmy Awards
| 1988 | Outstanding Lead Actor in a Limited Series or Movie | Mandela | Nominated | |
| 1989 | Outstanding Supporting Actor in a Limited Series or Movie | Lonesome Dove | Nominated | |
| 1996 | Outstanding Guest Actor in a Drama Series | Fallen Angels | Nominated | |
| 2000 | Outstanding Supporting Actor in a Limited Series or Movie | Freedom Song | Nominated | |
Daytime Emmy Awards
| 2003 | Outstanding Directing for a Children's Special | Just a Dream | Nominated | |

=== Grammy Awards ===
| Year | Category | Nominated work | Result | Ref. |
|---|---|---|---|---|
| 1991 | Best Recording for Children | How the Leopard Got His Spots | Nominated | |
| 1992 | Best Recording for Children | Brer Rabbit And The Wonderful Tar Baby | Nominated | |
| 1994 | Best Recording for Children | Brer Rabbit And Boss Lion | Nominated | |
| 1996 | Best Spoken Word | Long Walk to Freedom | Nominated | |

=== Screen Actors Guild Awards ===
| Year | Category | Nominated work | Result | Ref. |
|---|---|---|---|---|
| 2000 | Outstanding Actor in a Miniseries or Movie | Fallen Angels | Nominated | |
| 2006 | Outstanding Ensemble Cast in a Motion Picture | Dreamgirls | Nominated | |

=== Independent Spirit Awards ===
| Year | Category | Nominated work | Result | Ref. |
|---|---|---|---|---|
| 1991 | Best Male Lead | To Sleep with Anger | Won | |

== Miscellaneous awards ==
=== CableACE Award ===
| Year | Category | Work |
|---|---|---|
| 1989 | Actor in a Movie or Miniseries | Mandela |
| 1996 | Dramatic or Theatrical Special | America's Dream |
| 1996 | Actor in a Dramatic Special or Series | America's Dream |

=== NAACP Image Awards ===
| Year | Category | Work |
|---|---|---|
| 1988 | Outstanding Lead Actor in a Drama Series, Mini-Series or Television Movie | Mandela |
| 1989 | Outstanding Lead Actor in a Motion Picture | Lethal Weapon |
| 1995 | Outstanding Lead Actor in a Television Movie or Mini-Series | Queen |
| 1999 | Outstanding Lead Actor in a Motion Picture | Beloved |
| 2001 | Outstanding Actor in a Television Movie, Mini-Series or Dramatic Special | Freedom Song |

=== MTV Movie Award ===
| Year | Category | Work |
|---|---|---|
| 1993 | Best On-Screen Duo | Lethal Weapon 3 (Shared with Mel Gibson) |

=== Theatre World Award ===
| Year | Work |
|---|---|
| 1982 | "Master Harold"...and the Boys |

=== Women in Film Crystal Awards ===
| Year | Category | Work |
|---|---|---|
| 1994 | Humanitarian Award | Himself |

== Festival awards ==
| Year | Award | Category |
|---|---|---|
| 1993 | San Francisco International Film Festival | Piper-Heidsieck Award |
| 2002 | Jamerican International Film Festival | Lifetime Achievement Award |
| 2003 | Los Angeles Pan African Film Festival | Lifetime Achievement Award |
| 2008 | Karlovy Vary International Film Festival | Festival President's Award |
