= Charles Mungoshi =

Zimbabwean writer (1947–2019)

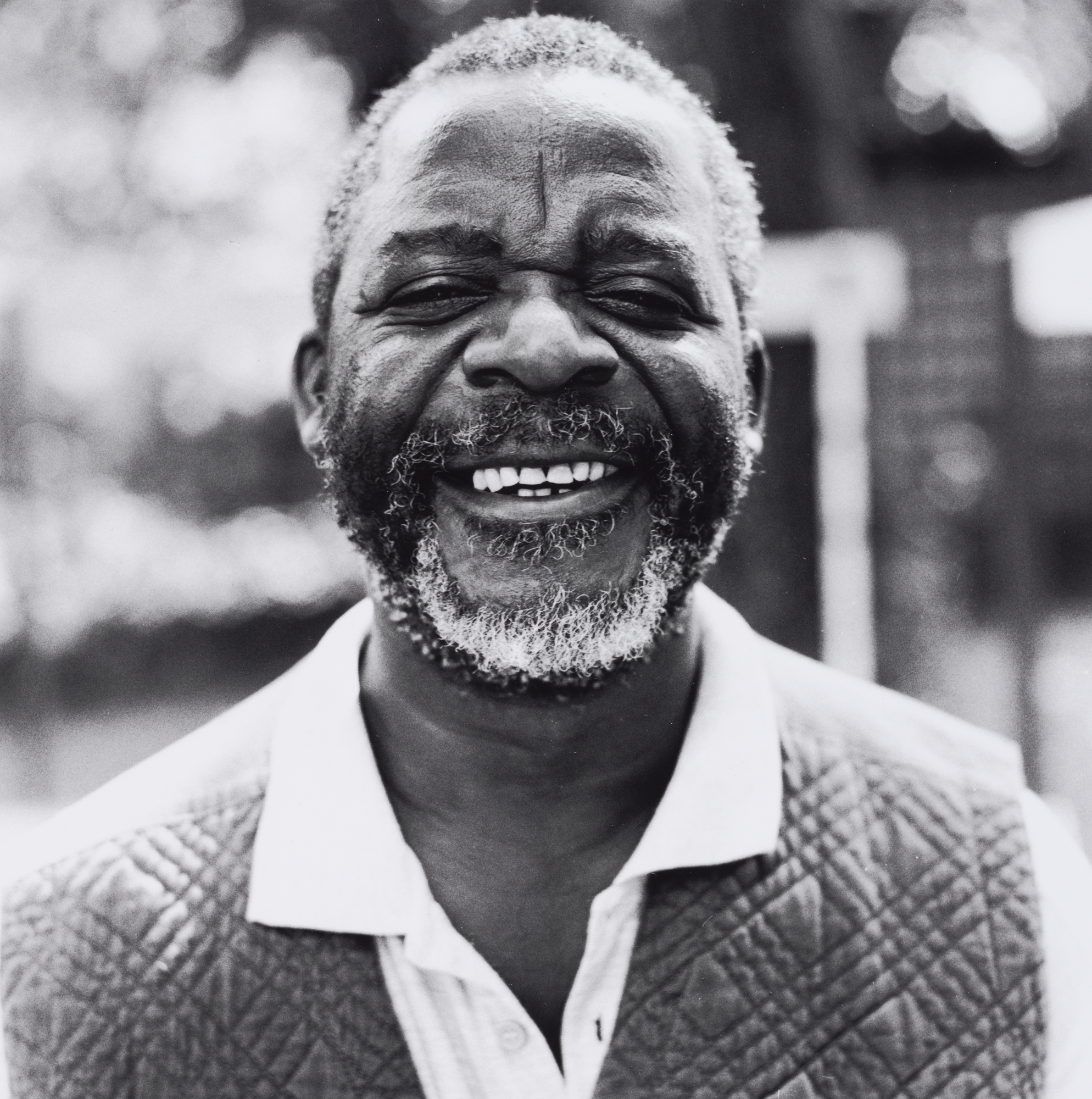
- Born: Charles Lovemore Mungoshi; 2 December 1947 at Manyene, near Chivhu (Southern Rhodesia)
- Died: 16 February 2019 (aged 71); Harare, Zimbabwe
- Children: 5
- Writing career
- Notable awards: Noma Award (1992); Commonwealth Writers' Prize (1988 and 1998); National Arts Merit Award (2014)

Charles Lovemore Mungoshi (2 December 1947 – 16 February 2019), was a Zimbabwean writer.

== Life and career ==
Mungoshi was born on 2 December 1947 at Manyene, near Chivhu, in Zimbabwe. He was educated at St Augustine's, Penhalonga. After leaving school, he worked with the Forestry Commission, before joining Textbook Sales in Harare. From 1975 to 1981 he worked at the Literature Bureau as an editor and then moved to the Zimbabwe Publishing House.

== Works and recognition ==
Mungoshi's works include short stories and novels in Shona and English. He also wrote poetry, but viewed it as a "mere finger exercise". He had a wide range, including anti-colonial writings and children's books. While the colonial regime initially banned his work he eventually wrote about post-colonial oppression as well. He was both an editor and a translator as well.

The awards he won include the Noma Award in 1992 and the Commonwealth Writers' Prize (Africa Region) twice in the years 1988 and 1998. Two of his novels, one in Shona and the other in English, both published in 1975, won the International PEN Awards. His first Shona novel was Makunun'unu Maodzamoyo followed by the English short collection Some Kinds of Wounds, which was banned by the colonial regime. His other Shona novel, Kunyarara Hakusi Kutaura, won several awards and his play Inongova Njakenjake showed his versatility as a writer. His Branching Streams Flow in the Dark won a National Arts Merit Award in 2014 for being the outstanding fiction book published in the year.

== Family ==
He is the brother of David Mungoshi.

He married an actress, Jesesi Mungoshi, who played the title role in the 1993 Zimbabwean film Neria (written by Tsitsi Dangarembga and directed by Godwin Mawuru). He held an Honorary degree from the University of Zimbabwe. Mungoshi also took part in some of the local Zimbabwean drama series in the late 1980s to early '90s, and played a role in a local drama Ndabvezera, which was produced by Aaron Chiundura Moyo.

Mungoshi died in Harare on 16 February 2019.

== Bibliography ==
- Coming of the Dry Season (1972)
- Ndiko Kupindana Kwamazuva (1975)
- Waiting for the Rain (1975)
- Makunun'unu Maodzamoyo ("Brooding Breeds Despair"; 1977)
- Inongova Njake Njake (1980)
- Kunyarara Hakusi Kutaura? (1983)
- The Setting Sun and the Rolling World (1987)
- Stories from a Childhood (1989)
- One Day Long Ago: More Stories from a Shona Childhood (1991)
- Walking Still (short stories; 1997)
- The Milkman Doesn't Only Deliver Milk (1998)
- Branching Streams Flow in the Dark (2013)
- How the World Will End (2017)
