= The Bafanas =

South African comic strip (1990s)

- Author: Sydney Chama
- Current status/schedule: Discontinued following Sydney Chama's death in 1996
- Launch date: Early 1990s
- Publisher: Bona Magazine
- Genres: Humour; Satire
- Original language: Zulu; English

The Bafanas was a popular South African comic strip that appeared on the back page of Bona Magazine during the early 1990s. They were created by Sydney Chama, a notable South African cartoonist and actor. Chama's work on The Bafanas showcased his talent for storytelling and illustration, cementing his legacy in South African cartooning history.
