= John Indi =

Zimbabwean actor (1953/1954–2024)

- Born: 1953 or 1954
- Died: 13 November 2024 (aged 70)
- Occupation: Actor

John Indi (1953 or 1954 – 13 November 2024) was a Zimbabwean actor known for his roles in A Far Off Place (1993), Mandela, and Incident at Victoria Falls (1992). Indi and his actor wife Kubi Indi, started a company making beauty products company based in Africa.

== Early years ==
John Indi was born in 1953 in Salisbury, Rhodesia. His father was a Malawian who came from a village 12 kilometers from Limbe, near Mount Mulanje in Malawi. His father left Malawi (then Nyasaland) in the early 1950s to look for work in Southern Rhodesia and found employment as a farm laborer, subsequently moving to Salisbury where he was employed as a cook and gardener. John was born in the servants quarters of his father's employer, a Mrs Turner. She assisted in the delivery of the baby and named him John.

Indi was initially educated at the Newlands Police Depot in Salisbury. In his second year he moved a government school called Forest Nursery which was just off Orange Grove Drive in Highlands. This school only provided education up to Standard 3. The Rhodesian Government provided no further education for black children in the white suburban areas of Salisbury. An informal school was operated by volunteers on the property of Hardwicke Holderness, and John attended lessons here until the age of about 10. Through funds raised by the FASCH charity (Friends of African School Children), John was sent for his secondary education to Gokomere School. He subsequently attended St. Francis of Assisi High School but along with a friend, he was expelled for rebellion.

The Rhodesian author Robert Cary held an executive position in a company called Highfield Bag where Indi was first employed. He had some musical talent and was introduced to the white theatrical community in Salisbury. This gave Indi his first start as an actor when he was cast as Othello in a Sundown Theater production of the same play. As a non-native English speaker, Indi had to study and rehearse intensively to produce a neutral English delivery of his lines. This resulted in a powerful performance and great acclaim.

== Background ==
After Zimbabwe became independent, Indi and his wife Chaza returned to the country. There they started a beauty products company called Kubi Cosmetics which is now a well-known brand in Southern Africa. It makes products that specifically for African skin and hair.

== Career ==
Indi played the part of the witch doctor in the 1982 film Shamwari which starred Ian Yule and Ken Gampu. He had a major role, playing the part of Oliver Tambo in the TV movie Mandela which was released in 1987. Another prominent role he had was paying the part of Khumalo in the Bill Corcoran directed film Incident at Victoria Falls which was released in 1992. He appeared as Bamuthi in the 1993 adventure film, A Far Off Place which was directed by Mikael Salomon. He had a part in Ruggero Deodato's Sotto il cielo dell'Africa aka Thinking About Africa which was released in 1999.

He was also well known as a voiceover artist and made a few advertisements for Chicken Licken, as well as Kiwi Shoe polish.

== Death ==
Indi died on 13 November 2024, at the age of 70.

== Selected filmography ==
Feature and television filmsActor
Title	Role	Director	Year	Notes #
Shamwari	Witchdoctor	Clive Harding	1982	
Mandela	Oliver Tambo	Ronald Harwood	1987	TV movie
Incident at Victoria Falls	Khumalo	Bill Corcoran	1992	
A Far Off Place	Bamuthi	Mikael Salomon	1993	

TelevisionActor
Title	Episode	Role	Director	Year	Notes #
Passeur d'enfants	L'enfant de Soweto	Adam Cotto	Franck Apprederis	1996	
Kongo	1959-1960	Eunungu		1997	Mini series
Soldier Soldier	Chain of Command	Rebel leader	Roger Tucker	1997	
Sotto il cielo dell'Africa		Mowanda	Ruggero Deodato	1999	

StageActor
Title	Role	Director	Year	Notes #
Scrooge	Ebenezer Scrooge		2012-2013	Christian Family Church production
