= One Away =

One Away may refer to:

- One Away, a pricing game on The Price Is Right
- One Away (film), a 1976 American action film
- "One Away" (C.A.T.S. Eyes), a 1986 television episode
