= Joe Bullet =

- Directed by: Louis de Witt
- Written by: Tonie van der Merwe
- Produced by: Tonie van der Merwe
- Starring: Ken Gampu; Joe Lopez; Abigail Kubeka; Jimmy Sabe; Cocky Tlhotlhalemaje; Sydney Charma
- Cinematography: Louis de Witt
- Edited by: Oscar Burn
- Music by: "Silver Threads" (theme song)
- Production company: Bullet Films
- Distributed by: Gravel Road Entertainment Group
- Release dates: 1 January 1973 (South Africa); 12 June 2015 (Sydney Film Festival)
- Running time: 79 minutes
- Country: South Africa
- Language: English

Joe Bullet is a South African action film. It was the first South African film to have an all-black cast, to appeal to black audiences. The film was followed by a 1982 sequel Bullet on the Run.

== Background ==
Independently released in 1973, Joe Bullet played at the Eyethu cinema in Soweto. The film was premiered without approval from apartheid censors and after two screenings the film was banned, although the ban was eventually overturned. For about 40 years the original film reels were stored by the writer and producer Tonie van der Merwe's, who kept the reels every time he moved home.

The film was restored by Gravel Road Distribution under the supervision of its original producer, Tonie van der Merwe.

=== Screenings ===
Joe Bullet was scheduled to appear at the MoMA annual film preservation festival in 2014. According to Variety on 18 October 2014, the film was to be screened at the New York fest on 8 and 13 November. It was announced on 24 January 2017 on Channel24.co.za that after 44 years the film was to be screened at the Bioscope Independent Cinema in Johannesburg on 24 January and at the Company Gardens in Cape Town on 25 January.

== Story ==
A local soccer team gets caught up in the criminal underworld scene.

Described by The Guardian as being modelled on something between Shaft and James Bond, Joe Bullet drives sports cars, drinks, does karate, shoots guns, throws knives, and climbs up mineshafts. Singer Abigail Kubeka also has a role in the film.

== Re-release ==
The film was made available to the public in Blu-ray format on 11 September 2017. It is part of the Vault series from 88 Films, a British film label.
