= Kubi Indi =

Zimbabwean activist and businesswoman

- Born: Ethel Kubvoruno Chaza
- Citizenship: Zimbabwe
- Occupations: Actor and business Woman
- Organization(s): Kubi Cosmetics in Southern Africa. Products specifically for African skin and hair.
- Notable work: Appearing in Live and Let Die in 1973 as a sales clerk serving James Bond. Produced I Am the Future. Neria,
- Movement: Secretary-general of the Indigenous Business Women's Organisation in Zimbabwe.
- Board member of: Member of the Women Filmmakers of Zimbabwe.
- Spouse: John Indi (d.2024)

Kubi Chaza Indi is a Zimbabwean development activist and businesswoman. Under her maiden name, Kubi Chaza, she was an actress in the United Kingdom, appearing in Live and Let Die in 1973 as a sales clerk serving James Bond. After returning to Zimbabwe, she and actor husband John Indi started a company making beauty products.

== Background ==
Indi is very active in the development community, particularly with respect to issues affecting women, and is secretary-general of the Indigenous Business Women's Organisation in Zimbabwe.

The Indis have continued to work in film-making, John as an actor, but Kubi on both sides of the camera. In 1989, she produced I Am the Future, a film about a young woman (played by Stella Chiweshe) who travels to the big city to escape Zimbabwe's independence war in the rural areas. In 1993, she played the eponymous heroine's modern neighbour in Neria, Tsitsi Dangarembga's script about widowhood in Zimbabwe. Both films were directed by Godwin Mawuru, and Neria featured a soundtrack by Oliver Mtukudzi.

Indi is a member of the Women Filmmakers of Zimbabwe.

== Career ==
Her role as the sales girl in the Oh Cult Voodoo shop came about when she was in the UK, and she got to play the part. Her character as the sales girl serves James Bond (played by Roger Moore), wraps an item for him and then rings the Mister Big when Bond leaves the shop.

After Zimbabwe became independent, Indi and her husband John returned to the country. There they started their beauty products company called Kubi Cosmetics. It is now a well-known brand in Southern Africa. It makes products that specifically for African skin and hair.

== Select filmography ==
- Toomorrow (1970) – Sylvana
- Live and Let Die (1973) – sales clerk (Oh Cult Voodoo Shop, 33 E 65th St, New York City, New York 10065)
- Love Thy Neighbour (1973) – first black girl
- Royal Flash (1975) – Lucy
- Neria (1993) – Connie
- Shaina (2020) – Rooster Gogo
