= Sydney Chama =

South African actor and comic strip artist (1942 - 1996)

- Born: June 1, 1942; Kwa-Zulu Natal, South Africa
- Died: October 8, 1996 (aged 54)
- Occupations: Actor; Cartoonist (comic strip)
- Known for: The Bafanas

Sydney Chama (1942-1996) was a South African actor and cartoonist. He was notable for both stage and screen performances and also as the cartoonist behind the popular comic strip The Bafanas on Bona Magazine in the early 1990s.

== Career ==
Chama's career spanned theatre and cinema. On stage, he performed in productions such as Sponono (written by Alan Paton and Krishna Shah), Driving Miss Daisy (Baxter Theatre, 1991), Night of January 16th, The Piano Lesson and Slave Trade. His film and television roles included appearances in Zulu Dawn (1979), The Wild Geese (1978), Cyborg Cop (1993), Rage to Kill and Operation Delta Force (TV movie, 1997).

=== Filmography ===
- The Wild Geese (1978) as Clark
- Zulu Dawn (1979) as S.M. Kambula
- Rage to Kill (1988) as Webster
- Hlala Kwabafileyo (1991) as Mike "Sgwili" Mdingi
- KwaKhala Nyonini (1992) as Bra Ben Shabangu
- Cyborg Cop (1993)
- Operation Delta Force (1997) as Banda
