= Xoliswa Sithole =

South African actress and filmmaker (born 1968)

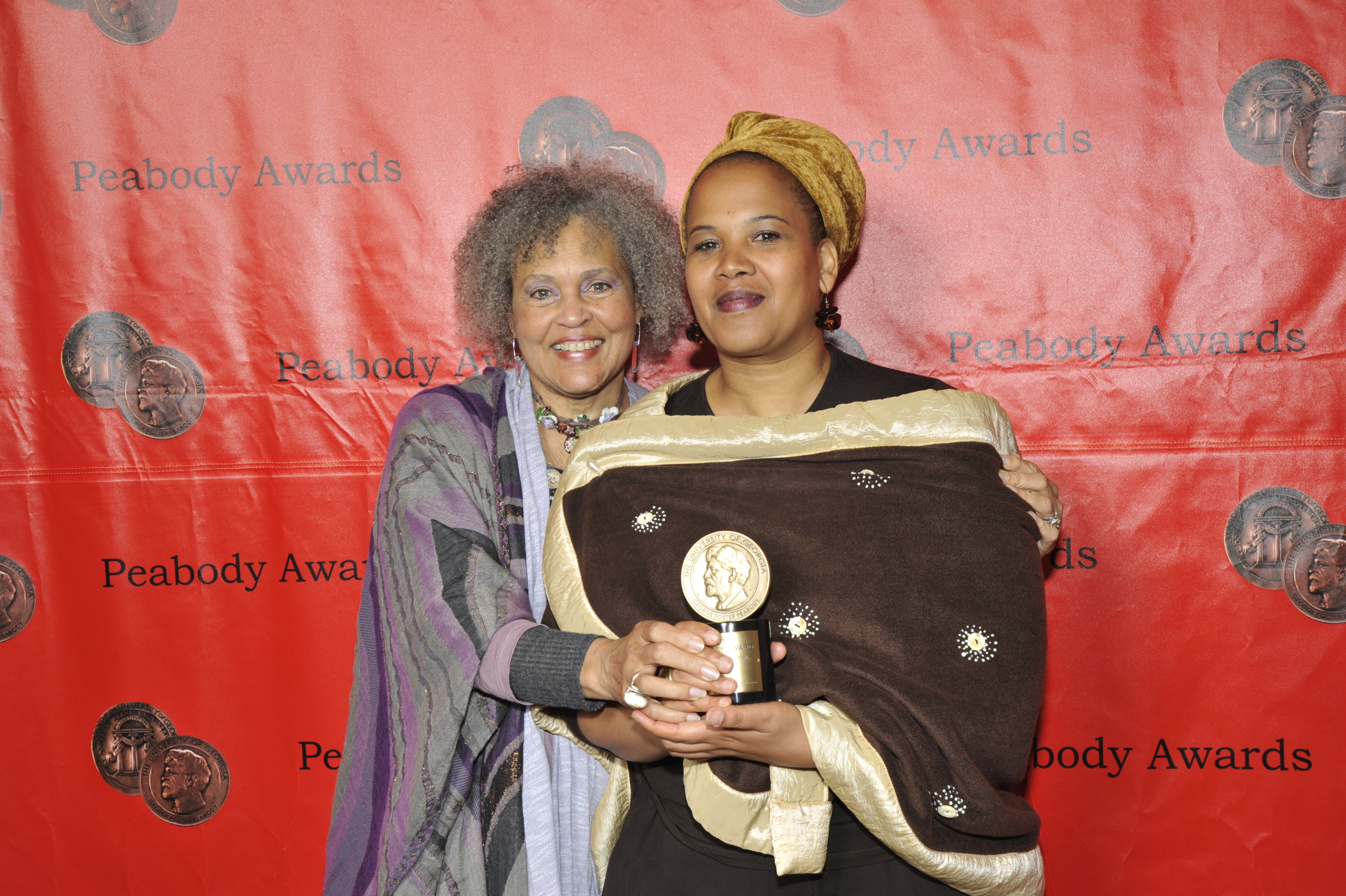
- Charlayne Hunter-Gault and Sithole, Peabody Awards ceremony, May 2011
- Born: 31 December 1968 (age 57); South Africa
- Education: University of Zimbabwe
- Occupations: Actress; Documentary filmmaker
- Awards: Peabody Award (2010); BAFTA Award (2011); BAFTA Award (2004)

Xoliswa Sithole (born 31 December 1968) is a South African actress and documentary filmmaker, raised in Zimbabwe. she won a BAFTA in 2004 for her documentary Orphans Of Nkandla. She won a Peabody Award in 2010 and a BAFTA in 2011 for her documentary Zimbabwe's Forgotten Children.

== Early life and education ==
Xoliswa Sithole was born in South Africa and raised in Zimbabwe after 1970. Her mother died from complications related to HIV/AIDS in 1995. Her stepfather's cousin, Ndabaningi Sithole, was a founder of the Zimbabwe African National Union (ZANU), and assassinated lawyer and politician Edison Sithole (1935–1975) was her cousin.

Sithole pursued a masters in English at the University of Zimbabwe and later made the decision to go to the U.S to attempt to do a degree in acting at Penn State. She spent some time in London working as a social worker.

In 1992, she went back to South Africa to meet her biological father and in 1994, officially moved there in hopes to become a producer.

== Career ==
Xoliswa Sithole was a personal assistant for Val Kilmer for the film The Ghost and the Darkness (1996). This experience made her realize this is not something she wanted to continue to do. She was an assistant director and actress for a South African film, Fools (1997), by Ramadan Suleman. Charlayne Hunter-Gault, an American journalist, has been a mentor for Sithole. Sithole worked for her as an associate producer on documentaries Mandela: Man of Our Times and Trans to Transition. It was Charlayne Hunter-Gault who pushed Sithole to do her own film about something that is important to her.

=== Shouting Silent (2002) ===
After losing her mother to AIDS, she decided to make a documentary that shows a huge problem in South Africa, which is the HIV and AID epidemic. This documentary is narrated by Sithole and she goes around different parts of South Africa to explore the lives of those who have been affected by the epidemic, specifically girls in South Africa.

=== Orphans of Nkandla (2004) ===
Brian Woods was the director of the documentary. He is the CEO of True Vision Productions, whose goal is to show people issues that may be overlooked. Sithole was one of the producers who worked on this documentary. Sithole is the first South African woman to win a BAFTA award.

=== Martine and Thandeka (2008) ===
This film explores xenophobic attacks on two women in South Africa. It shows the trauma that these women face by men.

=== Zimbabwe's Forgotten Children (2010) ===
Directed by Xoliswa Sithole and Jezz Neumann, Zimbabwe's Forgotten Children won a Peabody Award in 2010. The documentary explores the lives of many children in Zimbabwe and the hardships they have to face such as political matters. They interview the children living here, and we get a glimpse into their lives. Many children having to take care of their sick grandparents instead of going to school.

Her films have regularly appeared on the programs at the African Film Festival New York, and other international film festivals. In 1999, she was South Africa's ambassador at the Cannes Film Festival.

Sithole produced South Africa from Triumph to Transition and Mandela for CNN Prime Time, and the series Real Lives for South African television. Other film and television projects by Sithole include Child of the Revolution (2005–2015), The First South African, Return to Zimbabwe, Martine and Thandeka (2009), South Africa's Lost Girls, and The Fall (2016). "I have only one desire in life," she told interviewer Audrey McCluskey, "Only one – to create images that change the world."

Acting appearances by Sithole include roles in the films Cry Freedom (1987), Mandela (1987, television), Fools, and Chikin Biznis.
