= Killer Force =

1976 film by Val Guest

- Directed by: Val Guest
- Written by: Val Guest; Gerald Sanford; Michael Winder
- Produced by: Nat Wachsberger; Patrick Wachsberger; Robert Wachsberger
- Cinematography: David Millin
- Edited by: Bill Butler
- Music by: Georges Garvarentz
- Distributed by: American International Pictures
- Release date: January 14, 1976
- Running time: 102 min.
- Countries: Ireland; Switzerland; United States; United Kingdom
- Language: English

Killer Force, also known as The Diamond Mercenaries, is a 1976 thriller film directed by Val Guest and starring Telly Savalas, Peter Fonda and Christopher Lee. It was a co-production between the Republic of Ireland, Switzerland, United Kingdom (post production at Twickenham) and the United States, and was filmed primarily in Namibia, which at the time of filming was governed by South Africa. Its plot is about a gang of criminals who plan a major robbery of a diamond mine.

Val Guest called it "a very tough picture to make."

== Plot ==
Head of security Harry Webb fears that a diamond theft is about to take place at the company's major mining complex in the desert. He quickly manages to become very unpopular, particularly with Claire Chambers, a celebrated cover girl and daughter of the mine administrator. She is visiting the man she loves, Mike Bradley, who is responsible for security at the mine.

Nelson, the mine administrator, gives Bradley a curious mission—to steal a diamond. He wants to implicate Bradley in order to bring him into contact with a certain Lewis who is preparing to rob the mine with the aid of a group of mercenaries and a local accessory known as Father Christmas. Webb, not being informed of the deceit, relentlessly pursues Bradley, who is contacted by Lewis. With the mercenaries in the process of penetrating the mine, Bradley reveals himself to be Father Christmas, the organizer of the entire operation. With Webb in pursuit, Bradley flees into the desert with the only other survivors.

== Cast ==
- Telly Savalas as Webb
- Peter Fonda as Bradley
- Hugh O'Brian as Lewis
- Christopher Lee as Major Chilton
- O. J. Simpson as Alexander
- Maud Adams as Clare
- Ian Yule as Woods
- Michael Mayer as Adams
- Victor Melleney as Nelson
- Richard Loring as Roberts
- Stuart Brown as Chambers
- Marina Christelis as Danielle
- Frank Shelley as Keller
- Peter Van Dissel as Rick
- Cocky Tlhotlhalemaje as Franklyn
- Ian Hamilton as Doctor
- Dale Cutts as Plotter
- Don McCorkindale as Radio Operator
- Marigold Russell as Salesgirl
- Frank Douglas as Barman
- Kevin Basel as Guardhouse Sergeant
- Stuart Parker as Substation Guard
- Albert Raphael as Vault Guard
- Russell Newman as Young Guard
- Clive Scott as Sky 4 Pilot
- Robert Drayton as Sky 4 Navigator

== Production ==
The film was based on an original script by Michael Winder which Val Guest says "wasn’t very good in the state it was in and it had an awful lot of changes to be made in it, I took it over and they brought an American writer, Gerald Sanford, and we wrote it between us."

The film was mostly shot in Swakopmund in Namibia. Guest says they were helicoptered in every morning "into the desert because I wanted to shoot, where people hadn't shot, the dunes were virgin, so … we were dropped in every morning by helicopter, they flew the food in, it was tough going, but again enjoyable."

Guest says Peter Fonda "was a gentle pain in the arse, Telly [Savalas] couldn't stand him, called him the amateur. “Does the amateur know his lines?” “Yes.” “Well why doesn’t he fucking well say them instead of all these pauses. Fonda would create. He was on the health kick and he’d asked for a blender and it hadn't arrived that morning for his breakfast of three bananas and an almond thing and he refused to come on location till it arrived, and as they’d had to fly in to Windhoek to get it, and fly back, that sort of thing."

== Reception ==
Guest says he was not paid more than $100,000 by the producer, Nat Wachsberger, "another one of filmland’s villains" so the director had to sue. The director says the film "made a fortune of money and Nat just went on a round the world cruise with his wife. Spent it."

== Releases ==
=== DVD ===
The film was released as Killer Force on DVD in 2013 by Metro-Goldwyn-Mayer as part of the 12 Action Adventure Movies 3-Disc set. This marks the first time that the film has been released since the VHS era.

It is also available in a two-pack with Brannigan from Amazon.com.

=== Blu-ray ===
In May 2016, the film was released on Blu-ray in North America by Kino Lorber. The new release features a 2015 high-definition remaster. The opening credits of this release show the title as The Diamond Mercenaries; a text explanation before the movie starts explains that the film Kino received from the movie studio had those opening credits. The alternate Killer Force opening credits are available as a special feature. In addition, a previously unseen alternate ending is included as another special feature.
