= Shamwari (film) =

- Directed by: Clive Harding
- Written by: Ian Yule
- Starring: Ken Gampu; Ian Yule; Tamara Franke; Denny Fathe-Aazam; Josh Makawa; Oliver Tengende; Jon Allen; Jimmy Coburn; Ron Tornborn; Sam Mathambo
- Cinematography: Vincent G. Cox
- Edited by: Mike Dicks
- Music by: Paul Nissen; Four Jacks and a Jill
- Distributed by: Video; US: Media Home Entertainment; Greece: Videosonic
- Release date: 14 May 1982 (South Africa)
- Running time: 93 minutes
- Country: Rhodesia
- Language: English

Shamwari is a film that starred two of South Africa's leading actors, Ken Gampu and Ian Yule. It is about two escapees that can't stand each other. Chained together they embark on an escape from custody.

== Background ==
The film was shot on location in and around the city of Salisbury. It was released in the United States on both Beta and VHS through Media Home Entertainment. Ken Gampu played the part of Khumalo, Ian Yule played the part of Mathews and Tamara Franke played the part of Tracy. Dominic Kanaventi also appears the film in one of his early roles, and also in an early role, John Indi makes an appearance as the witchdoctor. Ian Yule was also the co-writer for the film. He was led to believe that the film was a flop. John Hume who produced the film was marketing it under a different name. The soundtrack for the movie was provided by the music group Four Jacks and a Jill.

The film was released in South Africa by Ster-Kinekor and premiered in Johannesburg.

== Story ==
Set during the Rhodesian Bush War, the story is about two escaped convicts who are bonded together by chains. The film bears a similarity to an earlier film, The Defiant Ones that starred Sidney Poitier and Tony Curtis. Like the characters in The Defiant Ones, there is racial hatred between the two of them. The two main characters have escaped from a harsh chain gang. To survive they have to bury their differences as they try to make their way to freedom as they cross the country.

== Releases ==
Beta VCL VL9037 - United States - 1985.

== Cast ==
- Ian Yule ... Bill Matthews
- Ken Gampu ... Khumalo
- Tamara Franke ... Tracy
- Denny Fathe-Aazam ... Inspector Spencer
- Joshua Makawa ... Fanyana
- Oliver Tengende ... Sipho
- Jon Allen ... The Seducer
- Jimmy Coburn ... Jack, Tracy's Boyfriend
- Ron Tornbohn ... Storekeeper
- Sam Matambo ... Gardener
- John Indi ... Witchdoctor
- Jane Kilalea ... Policewoman
- Debbie Brinkworth ... Nurse
- Vic Crous ... First Warder
- Dennis Hardman ... Second Warder
- Stanley Gorodema ... Police Sergeant
- Alan Cockle ... Reporter
- Cecil Holmes ... Pilot
- Garry Watson ... Slide Projectionist
- Steve Chigorimbo ... Sipho's Man #1
- Brian Dzimwasha ... Sipho's Man #2
- Ephrim Mhute ... Sipho's Man #3
- Alan Gibson ... Farmer
- Clive Bulle ... Farmer
- Rita Chiwedzwa ... Khumalo's Wife
- Judy Turner ... Matthews' Wife
- Hilton Mambo ... Lone Terrorist
- Blackie Swarts ... Engine Driver
- Mike Wakefield ... Fireman (Stoker)
- Barry McCurdy ... Guard Force Member
- Martin Rusike ... Guard Force Member
- Dominic Kanaventi ... Guard Force Member
- Hywell Williams ... Policeman
- Mike Lanchester ... Policeman
- John Lant ... Policeman
- James Thrush ... Policeman
- Eve Chindiwo ... Fanyana's Girlfriend
- Joan Hulley ... Lady in Flat
- Ron Temlett ... Barman
- Clive Harding ... Musician / Himself (4 Jacks and a Jill band member)
- Tony Hughes ... Musician / Himself (4 Jacks and a Jill band member)
- Glenys Lynne ... Singer / Herself (4 Jacks and a Jill band member)
- Paul Nissen ... Musician / Himself (4 Jacks and a band member)
- Neill Pienaar ... Musician / Himself (4 Jacks and a band member)
