= Charmaine Mujeri =

Zimbabwean actress

- Occupation: Actress

Charmaine Mujeri is a Zimbabwean actress. In 2020, she was nominated for best supporting actress at the Africa Movie Academy Awards.

== Film credits ==
Mujeri was a stage performer at the 2017 Harare International Festival of the Arts. In 2019, she starred in a play, Ruvajena to increase awareness on the struggles of people living with albinism. In the same year, she played supporting role in the feature film, Cooked Up. The film was screened across Africa, and was a recipient of multiple awards from National Art Merit Awards (NAMA) and the Zimbabwe International Film Festival (ZIFF). In 2020, Mujeri's role in the political drama, Mirage earned her an AMAA nomination for best supporting actress. The film was also the first feature for model Malaika Mushandu.

In a collaborative production with USAID Shaina, Mujeri was one of the cast to build capacity of young women in Zimbabwe.
