= Danny Glover =

American actor (born 1946)

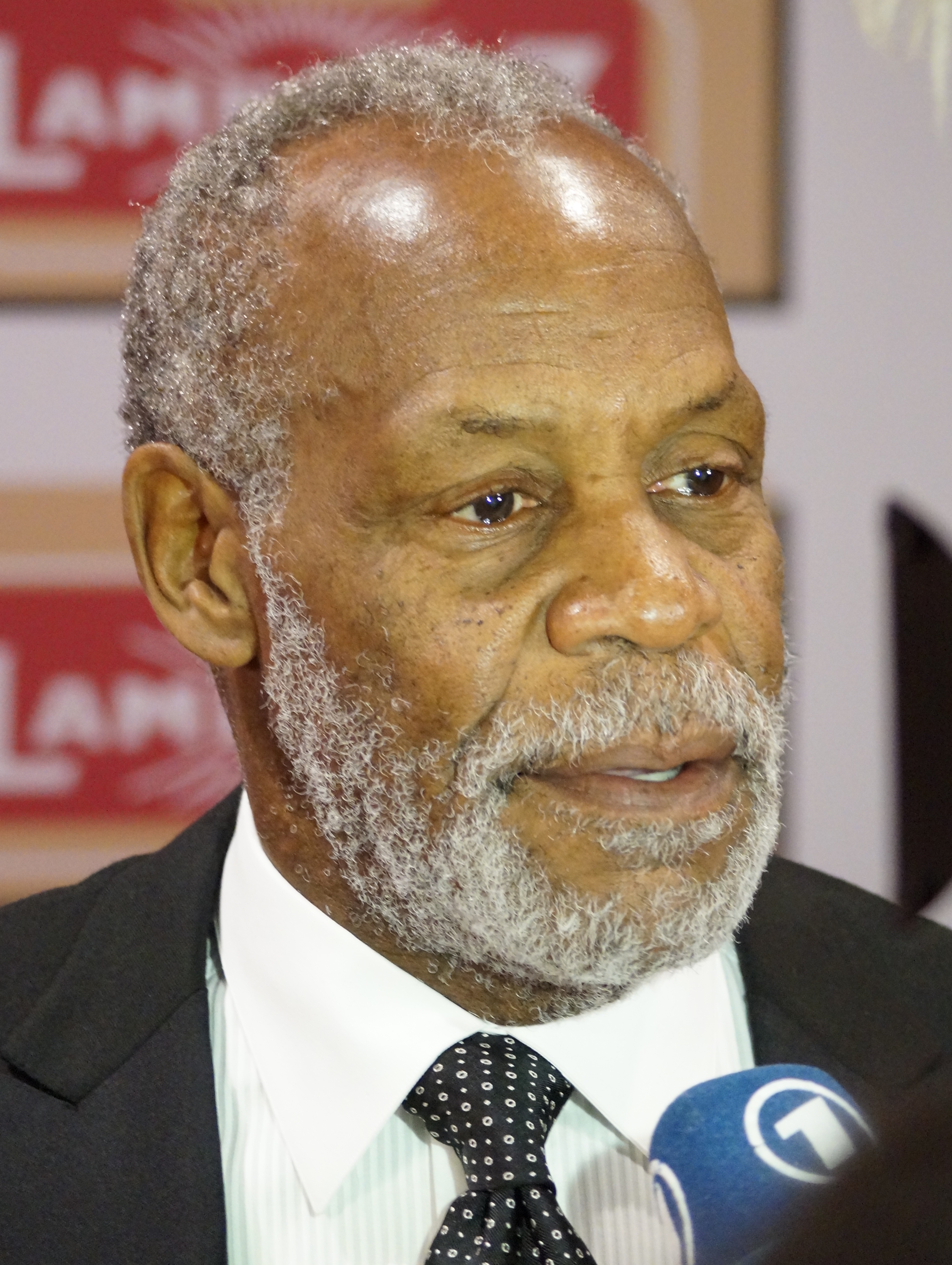
- Glover in 2015
- Born: July 22, 1946 (age 80); San Francisco, California, U.S.
- Occupations: Actor; producer; political activist
- Years active: 1976–2026
- Known for: Roger Murtaugh in Lethal Weapon
- Spouses: Asake Bomani (m. 1975; div. 2000) Eliane Cavalleiro (m. 2009; div. 2022)
- Children: 1
- Website: louverturefilms.com

Danny Glover (/ˈɡlʌvər/ GLUV-ər; born July 22, 1946) is an American actor, producer, and political activist. He has received numerous accolades including the Jean Hersholt Humanitarian Award from the Academy of Motion Picture Arts and Sciences, the NAACP's President's Award, as well as nominations for five Emmy Awards and four Grammy Awards.

Glover made his film acting debut in Escape from Alcatraz in 1979. He rose to fame in the late 1980s for playing Roger Murtaugh in the Lethal Weapon film series. Glover's other notable films include Places in the Heart (1984), The Color Purple (1985), Witness (1985) Silverado (1985), To Sleep with Anger (1990), Predator 2 (1990), Grand Canyon (1991), Bopha! (1993), Angels in the Outfield (1994), The Royal Tenenbaums (2001), Saw (2004), Dreamgirls (2006), Shooter (2007), Be Kind Rewind (2008), 2012 (2009), Death at a Funeral (2010), Beyond the Lights (2014), Sorry to Bother You (2018), and The Last Black Man in San Francisco (2019).

He is known for his work in television, receiving four Primetime Emmy Award nominations for his roles as Nelson Mandela in the HBO television film Mandela (1987), Joshua Deets in the CBS western miniseries Lonesome Dove (1989), Philip Marlowe in the Showtime neo-noir series Fallen Angels (1995), and Will Walker in TNT biographical film Freedom Song (2000). He had recurring roles in Hill Street Blues, ER, and Brothers & Sisters.

Glover is also an active supporter of various political causes. He is a member of the TransAfrica Forum and the Center for Economic and Policy Research. For his political work, he was awarded the Cuban National Medal of Friendship by the Cuban Council of State.

== Early life and education ==
Glover was born on July 22, 1946, in San Francisco, California, the son of Carrie Mae (née Hunley; 1919–1983) and James Henry Glover Jr. (1919–2001). Both of his parents were postal workers, and were active in the National Association for the Advancement of Colored People (NAACP), working to advance equal rights. Glover's mother, daughter of a midwife, was born in Louisville, Georgia, and graduated from Paine College in Augusta, Georgia. His father was a World War II veteran. He graduated from George Washington High School in San Francisco.

As an adolescent and a young adult, Glover had epilepsy but has not had a seizure since age 35. He attended San Francisco State University (SFSU) in the late 1960s but did not graduate. SFSU later awarded him the Presidential Medal of San Francisco State University for his service to education. Glover trained at the Black Actors' Workshop of the American Conservatory Theater.

== Career ==
=== 1976–1984: Early roles ===
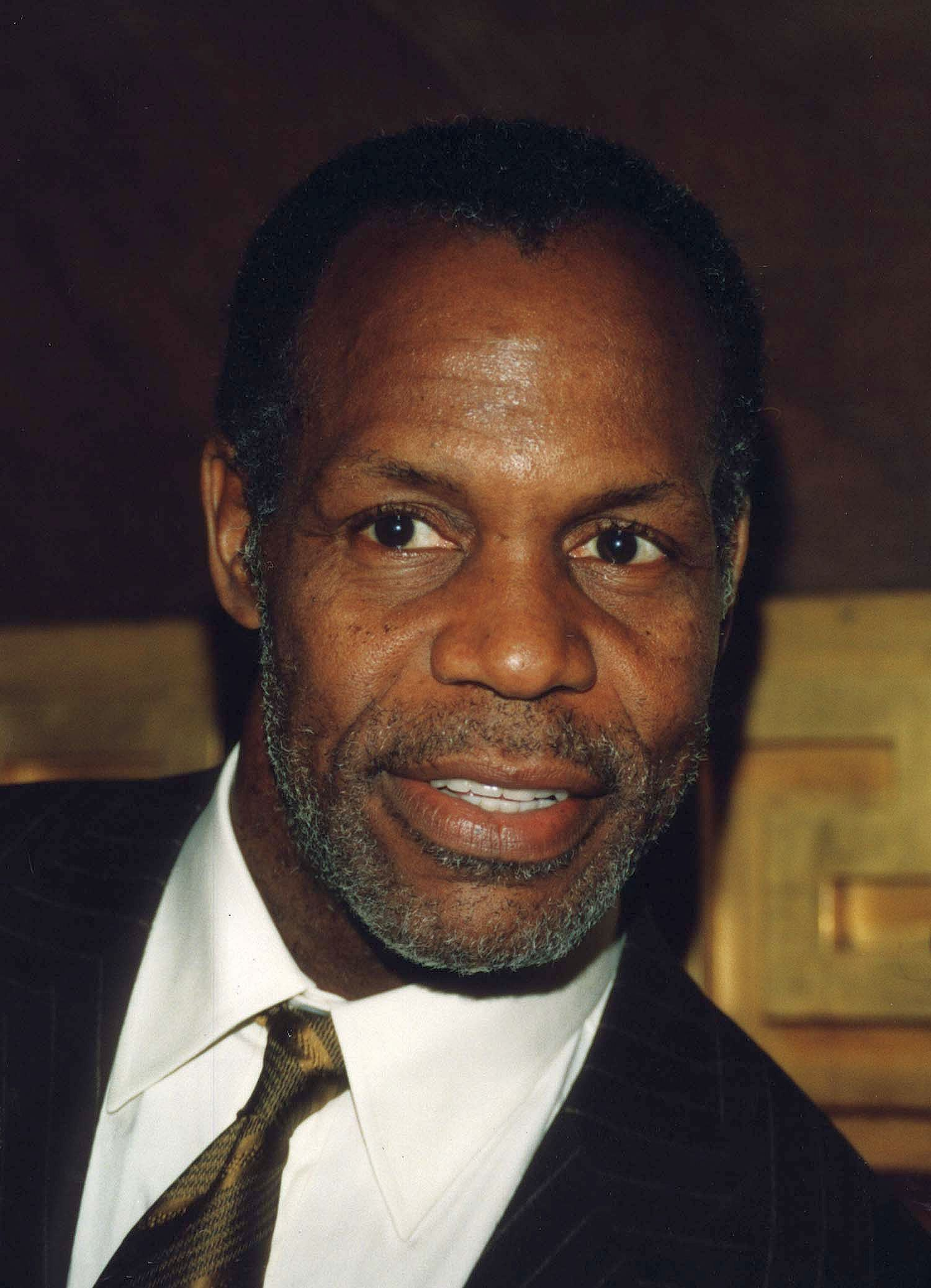
Glover in 1997

Glover originally worked in city administration working on community development before transitioning to theater. He has said:

I didn't think it was a difficult transition. Acting is a platform that can become a conveyer for ideas. Art is a way of understanding, of confronting issues and confronting your own feelings—all within that realm of the capacity it represents. It may have been a leap of faith for me, given not only my learning disability (dyslexia) but also the fact that I felt awkward. I felt all the things that someone that's 6'3" or 6'4" feels and with my own diminished expectations of who I could be [and] would feel. Whether it's art, acting or theater that I've devoted myself to I put more passion and more energy into it.

His first theater involvement was with the American Conservatory Theater, a regional training program in San Francisco in 1976. Glover also trained with Jean Shelton at the Shelton Actors Lab in San Francisco. In an interview on Inside the Actors Studio, Glover credited Jean Shelton for much of his development as an actor. Deciding that he wanted to be an actor, Glover resigned from his city administration job and soon began his career as a stage actor. Glover then moved to Los Angeles for more opportunities in acting.

Glover made his film acting debut in Escape from Alcatraz (1979). He has since had a variety of film, stage and television roles. His earlier work included a recurring role on Hill Street Blues, and the role of Moses Hadner in the 1984 drama film Places in the Heart.

=== 1985–2000: Breakthrough and acclaim ===
Glover gained acclaim in 1985 starring as the husband to Whoopi Goldberg's character Celie in the celebrated literary adaptation The Color Purple. The same year he played Lieutenant James McFee in the crime thriller film Witness, and Mal in the western film Silverado.

Glover is best known for playing Los Angeles police Sergeant Roger Murtaugh in the action film Lethal Weapon (1987), and in the 1989, 1992 and 1998 sequels of the film series, starring alongside Mel Gibson. He received Primetime Emmy Award nominations for his roles as Nelson Mandela in the HBO television film Mandela (1987) and Joshua Deets in CBS western miniseries Lonesome Dove (1989). In 1990, he earned top billing for the first time in the blockbuster Predator 2 with Gary Busey, the sequel to the science-fiction action film Predator. That same year, he starred in Charles Burnett's To Sleep with Anger, for which he won the Independent Spirit Award for Best Male Lead. He also appeared in films such as Grand Canyon (1991) and Bopha! (1993).

During his career, Glover has also made several cameos, appearing, for example, in the Michael Jackson video "Liberian Girl" of 1987. In 1994, Glover and actor Ben Guillory founded the Robey Theatre Company in Los Angeles in honor of the actor and concert singer Paul Robeson. Its purpose was to focus on theatre by and about Black people.

Also in 1994, Glover made his directorial debut with the Showtime channel short film Override. That same year, he played the role of baseball manager George Knox in Angels in the Outfield for Walt Disney Pictures.

In common with Humphrey Bogart, Elliott Gould and Robert Mitchum, who have played Raymond Chandler's private eye detective Philip Marlowe, Glover played the role in the episode "Red Wind" of the Showtime network's 1995 series Fallen Angels, earning him a Primetime Emmy Award nomination. Also that year, Glover played Captain Sam Cahill in the war film Operation Dumbo Drop.

In 1997, under his former production company banner Carrie Films, Glover executive produced numerous films of first time directors including Pamm Malveaux's neo-noir short film Final Act starring Joe Morton, which aired on the Independent Film Channel. In 1998, he starred as Paul D. in the drama film Beloved, based on Toni Morrison's novel. In addition, Glover has been a voice actor in many children's movies including The Prince of Egypt (1998), Antz (1998) and Our Friend, Martin (1999). In 2000, he played Will Walker in TNT biographical film Freedom Song, which earned him another Primetime Emmy Award nomination.

=== 2001–present: Established actor ===
Glover was featured in the Wes Anderson directed 2001 film The Royal Tenenbaums, also starring Gwyneth Paltrow, Anjelica Huston, Ben Stiller and Owen Wilson.

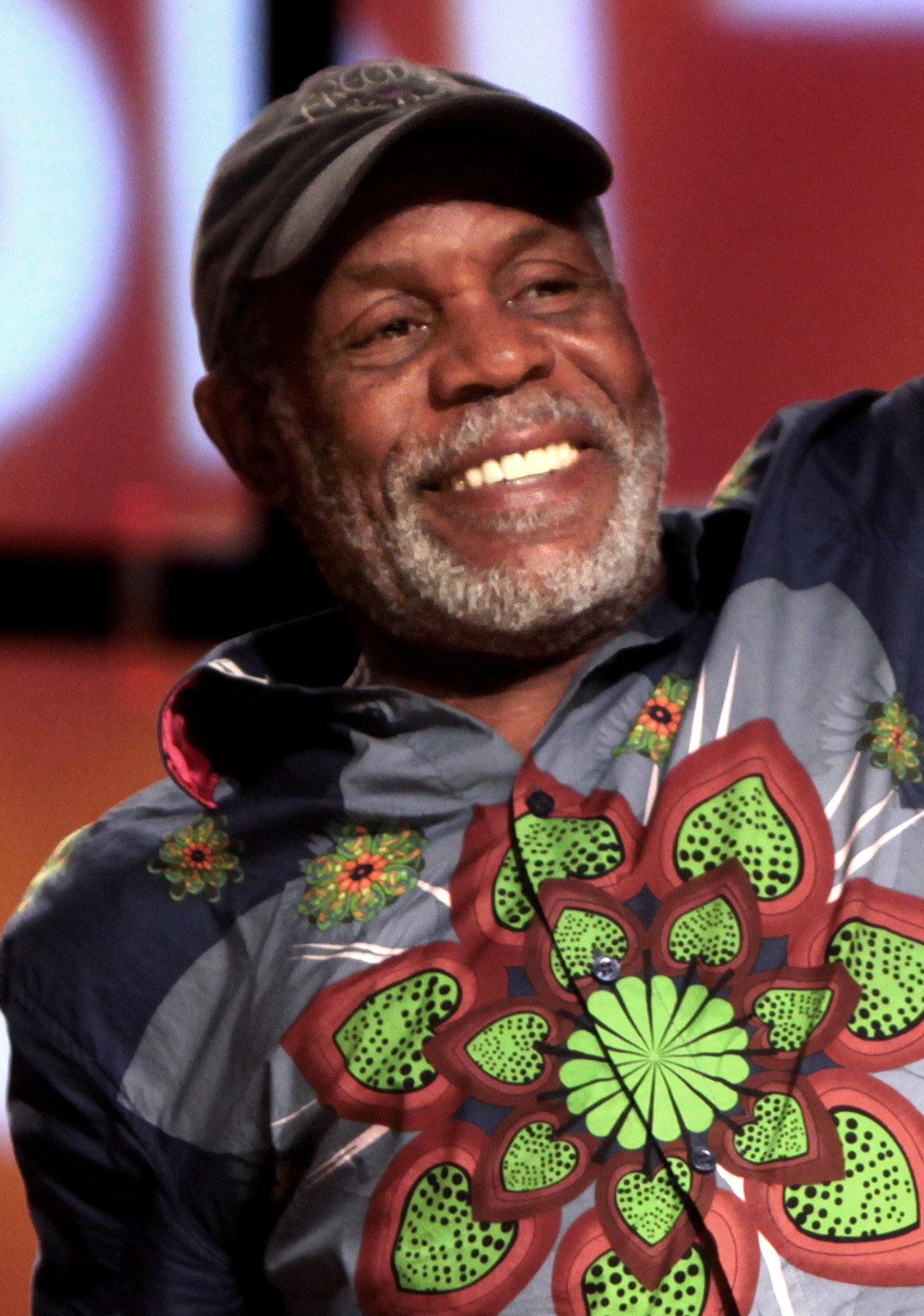
Glover at the 2014 Phoenix Comicon

In 2004, he appeared in the low-budget horror film Saw as Detective David Tapp. In 2005, Glover and Joslyn Barnes announced plans to make No FEAR, a film about Dr. Marsha Coleman-Adebayo's experience. Coleman-Adebayo won a 2000 jury trial against the US Environmental Protection Agency (EPA). The jury found the EPA guilty of violating the civil rights of Coleman-Adebayo on the basis of race, sex, color and a hostile work environment, under the Civil Rights Act of 1964. Coleman-Adebayo was terminated shortly after she revealed the environmental and human disaster taking place in the Brits, South Africa vanadium mines. Her experience inspired the passage of the Notification and Federal Employee Anti-discrimination and Retaliation Act of 2002 (No-FEAR Act). As of 2013 the No Fear title has not appeared but The Marsha Coleman-Adebayo Story was announced as the next major project of No Fear Media Productions.

Glover portrayed David Keaton in the television film The Exonerated (2005)—a real-life story of Keaton's experience of being arrested, jailed, and then freed from death row. In 2006, he voiced Miles, an elderly mule, in the animated film Barnyard, and played Marty Madison in the musical Dreamgirls. In 2007, he played Colonel Isaac Johnson in the action thriller Shooter.

In 2009, Glover performed in The People Speak, a documentary feature film that uses dramatic and musical performances of the letters, diaries and speeches of everyday Americans, based on historian Howard Zinn's A People's History of the United States. He also had recurring roles on the shows ER and Brothers & Sisters.

Glover played President Thomas Wilson, the President of the United States in 2012, a disaster film directed by Roland Emmerich and released in theaters November 13, 2009. In 2010, Glover participated in the black comedy film Death at a Funeral, and a Spanish film called I Want to Be a Soldier. In 2012, he starred in the film Donovan's Echo.

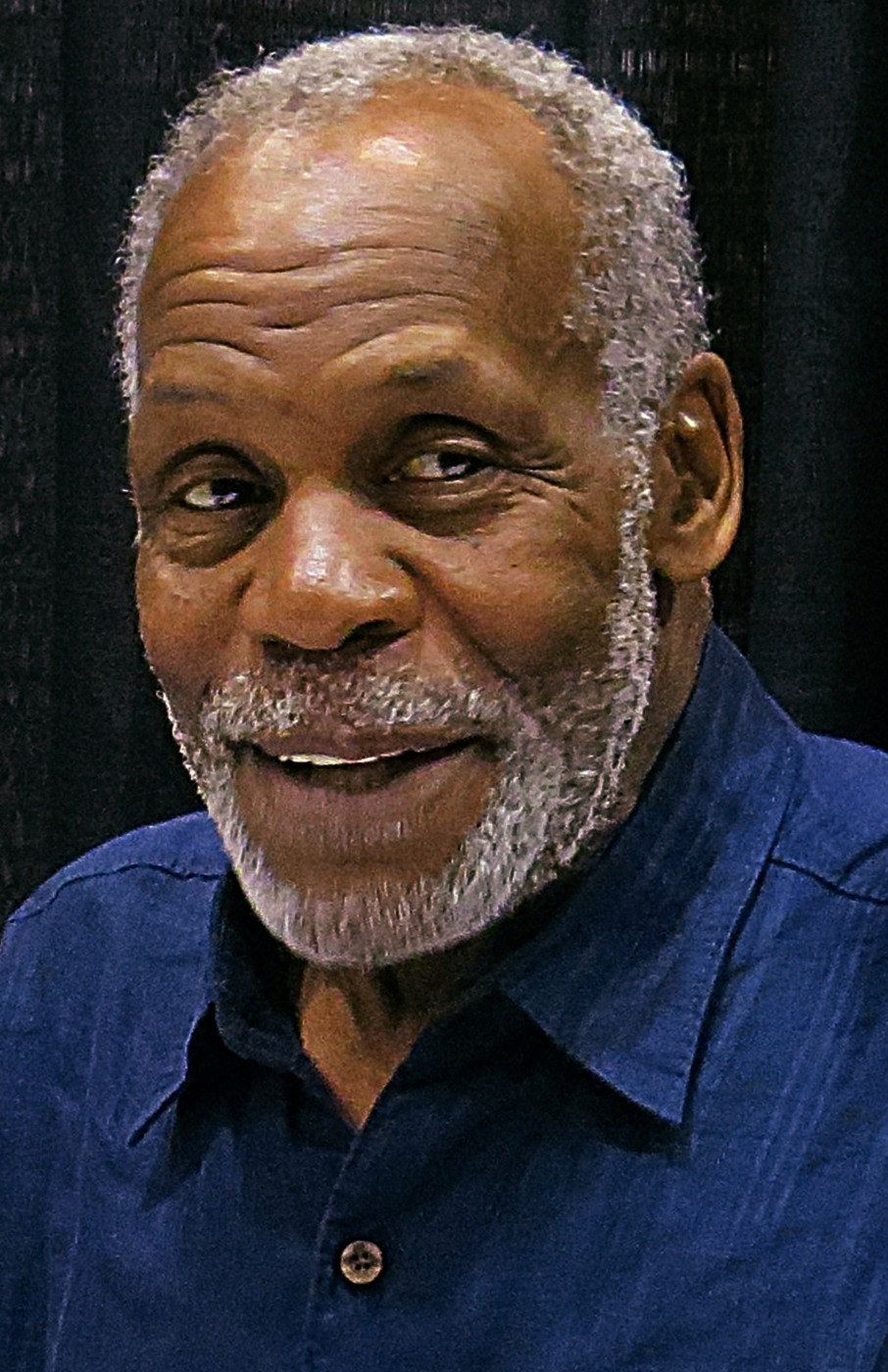
Glover in 2014

Glover co-starred in the science fiction comedy film Sorry to Bother You, which was released in theaters on July 6, 2018. He also appeared in the film The Last Black Man in San Francisco (2019). In December 2019, he played Milo Walker in the action comedy film Jumanji: The Next Level starring Dwayne Johnson, Kevin Hart, Jack Black and Karen Gillan.

Glover played Mark Walker in the indie drama film The Drummer (2020). He appeared in an episode of the ABC sitcom Black-ish (2014–2022) as Uncle Norman in 2020. He played Jerry in the comedy American Dreamer (2022). He played Cooper in the romantic drama Press Play (2022). He played Santa Claus in the Disney+ original movie The Naughty Nine (2023). He played Michael Tedeschi in the film Double Soul (2023).

== Unrealized projects ==
Glover has long sought to make a biopic of Toussaint Louverture for his directorial debut. In May 2006, the film had cast members Wesley Snipes, Angela Bassett, Don Cheadle, Jonathan Rhys Meyers, Chiwetel Ejiofor, Roger Guenveur Smith, Mos Def, Isaach de Bankolé, and Richard Bohringer attached. Production, estimated to cost $30 million, was planned to begin in Poland, filming from late 2006 into early 2007.

In May 2007, President of Venezuela Hugo Chávez agreed to contribute $18 million to fund the production of Toussaint for Glover, who was a prominent U.S. supporter of Chávez. The contribution annoyed some Venezuelan filmmakers, who said the money could have funded other homegrown films and that Glover's film was not even about Venezuela. In April 2008, the Venezuelan National Assembly authorized an additional $9,840,505 for Glover's film, which was still in pre-production.

The film remains unproduced. In 2015, Glover stated: "The film that we always missed is a movie on the Haitian revolution and Toussaint Louverture. The company [Louverture Films] is fortuitously named after him and that was the movie that I wanted to do. We've developed a script. We thought we were going to get it done four years ago. We thought we were going to be making it right now. But also there are other kinds of things that intrigue me." As of 2024, the project does not appear on the active slate of Louverture Films, and Glover stepped down as the company's CEO in June of that year.

== Public appearances ==
Glover appeared at London Film and Comic Con 2013 at Earls Court 2 over 2.5 days during Friday 5th to Sunday, July 7. He participated in a panel discussion in McComb, Mississippi on July 16, 2015. The event, co-sponsored by The Gloster Project and Jubilee Performing Arts Center, included noted authors Terry McMillan and Quincy Troupe.

On January 30, 2015, Glover was the Keynote Speaker and 2015 Honoree for the MLK Celebration Series at the Rhode Island School of Design (Providence, RI). Glover used his career and personal story to speak on the topic "Creativity and Democracy: Social Change through the Arts". At the University of the Virgin Islands, Glover gave a speech that encouraged the graduates in their upcoming journey.

It was announced in July 2018 that Glover will be the featured guest at the Port Townsend Film Festival in Washington State.

== Personal life ==
Glover married Asake Bomani in 1975 and they have a daughter, Mandisa, born in 1976. Glover and Bomani divorced in 2000. Glover married Eliane Cavalleiro in 2009. They divorced in 2022.

Glover purchased a 6,000-square-foot (560 m^{2}) house in Dunthorpe, Oregon, in 1999. As of 2011, he no longer lives in Oregon. He currently lives in San Francisco.

In July 2026, Glover announced that he was diagnosed with Alzheimer's disease.

== Activism ==
=== Civil rights activism ===
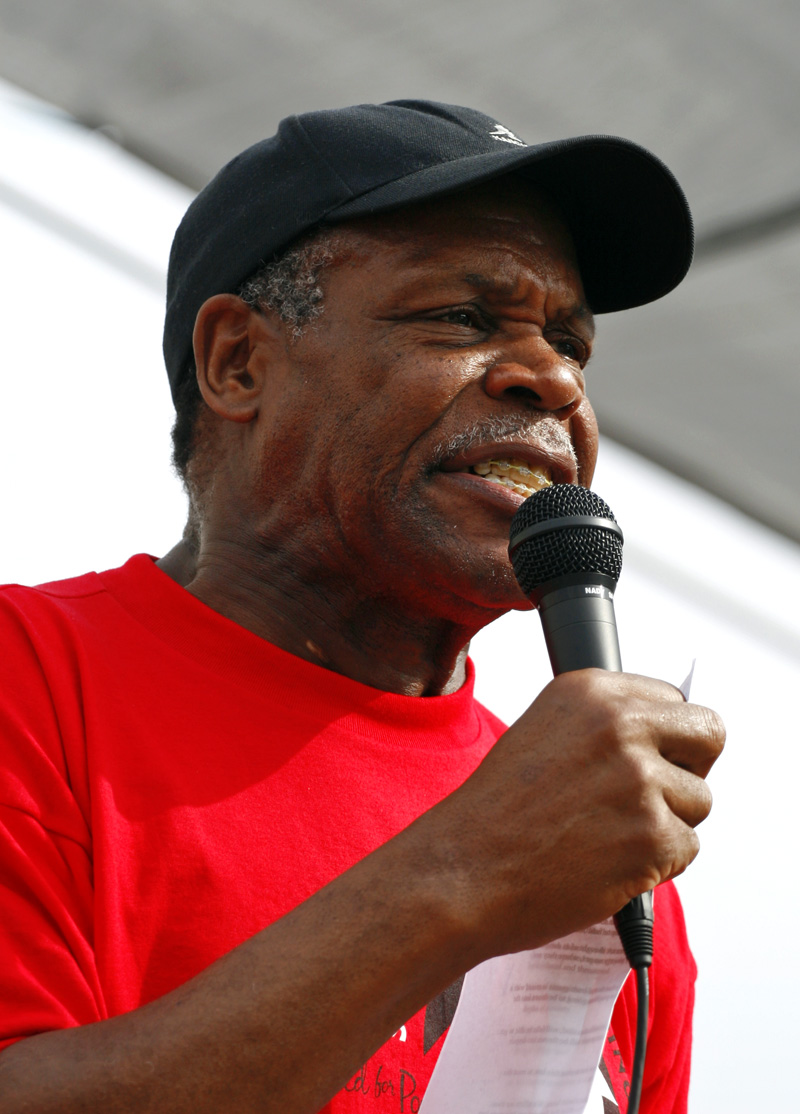
Glover speaks at a March for Immigrants Rights in Madison, Wisconsin, in 2007.

While attending San Francisco State University (SFSU), Glover was a member of the Black Students' Union, which, along with the Third World Liberation Front and the American Federation of Teachers, collaborated in a five-month student-led strike to establish a Department of Black Studies. The strike stemmed from past urges for the implementation but ultimately erupted after the firing of English teacher and Black Panther Party member George Mason Murray, and was the longest student walkout in U.S. history. It helped create not only the first Department of Black Studies but also the first School of Ethnic Studies in the United States.

Hari Dillon, current president of the Vanguard Public Foundation, was a fellow striker at SFSU. Glover later co-chaired Vanguard's board. He is also a board member of the Algebra Project, the Black AIDS Institute, Walden House and Cheryl Byron's Something Positive Dance Group. He was charged with disorderly conduct and unlawful assembly after being arrested outside the Sudanese Embassy in Washington during a protest over Sudan's humanitarian crisis in Darfur.

In 1999, he used his leverage as a former San Francisco cab driver to raise awareness about African Americans being passed over for white passengers. In response, Rudolph Giuliani launched Operation Refusal, which suspended the licenses of cab drivers who favored white passengers over black ones.

Glover's long history of union activism includes support for the United Farm Workers, UNITE HERE, and numerous service unions. In March 2010, Glover supported 375 union workers in Ohio by calling upon all actors at the 2010 Academy Awards to boycott Hugo Boss suits following announcement of Hugo Boss's decision to close a manufacturing plant in Ohio after a proposed pay decrease from $13 to $8.30 an hour was rejected by the Workers United Union.

On November 1, 2011, Glover spoke to the crowd at Occupy Oakland on the day before the Oakland General Strike where thousands of protestors shut down the Port of Oakland.

=== Political activism ===
Glover was an early supporter of former North Carolina Senator John Edwards in the 2008 Democratic presidential primaries until Edwards' withdrawal, although some news reports indicated that he had endorsed Ohio Congressman Dennis Kucinich, whom he had endorsed in 2004. After Edwards dropped out, Glover then endorsed Barack Obama. In February 2016, Glover endorsed Vermont Senator Bernie Sanders for the Democratic presidential nomination. In February 2019, Glover again endorsed Sanders for US president in 2020.

In 2017, he co-authored a petition along with Noam Chomsky, Mark Ruffalo, Nancy Fraser, Oliver Stone and Eve Ensler, urging French citizens to vote for candidate Jean-Luc Mélenchon in the 2017 presidential election.

Glover was an outspoken critic of George W. Bush, calling him a known racist. "Yes, he's racist. We all knew that. As Texas's governor, Bush led a penitentiary system that executed more people than all the other U.S. states together. And most of the people who died were Afro-Americans or Hispanics."

Glover's support of Proposition 7 led him to use his voice in an automated phone call to generate support for the measure before the election.

On April 16, 2010, Glover was arrested in Maryland during a protest by SEIU workers for Sodexo's alleged unfair and illegal treatment of workers. He was given a citation and later released. The Associated Press reports "Glover and others stepped past yellow police tape and were asked to step back three times at Sodexo headquarters. When they refused, officers arrested them."

On the foreign policy of the Obama administration, Glover said: "I think the Obama administration has followed the same playbook, to a large extent, almost verbatim, as the Bush administration. I don't see anything different... On the domestic side, look here: What's so clear is that this country from the outset is protecting the interests of wealth and property. Look at the bailout of Wall Street. Why not the bailout of Main Street? He may be just a different face, and that face may happen to be black, and if it were Hillary Clinton, it would happen to be a woman.... But what choices do they have within the structure?"

Glover wrote the foreword to Phyllis Bennis' book, Challenging Empire: How People, Governments, and the UN Defy US Power. Glover is also a member of the board of directors of the Center for Economic and Policy Research, a think tank led by economist Dean Baker.

=== International ===
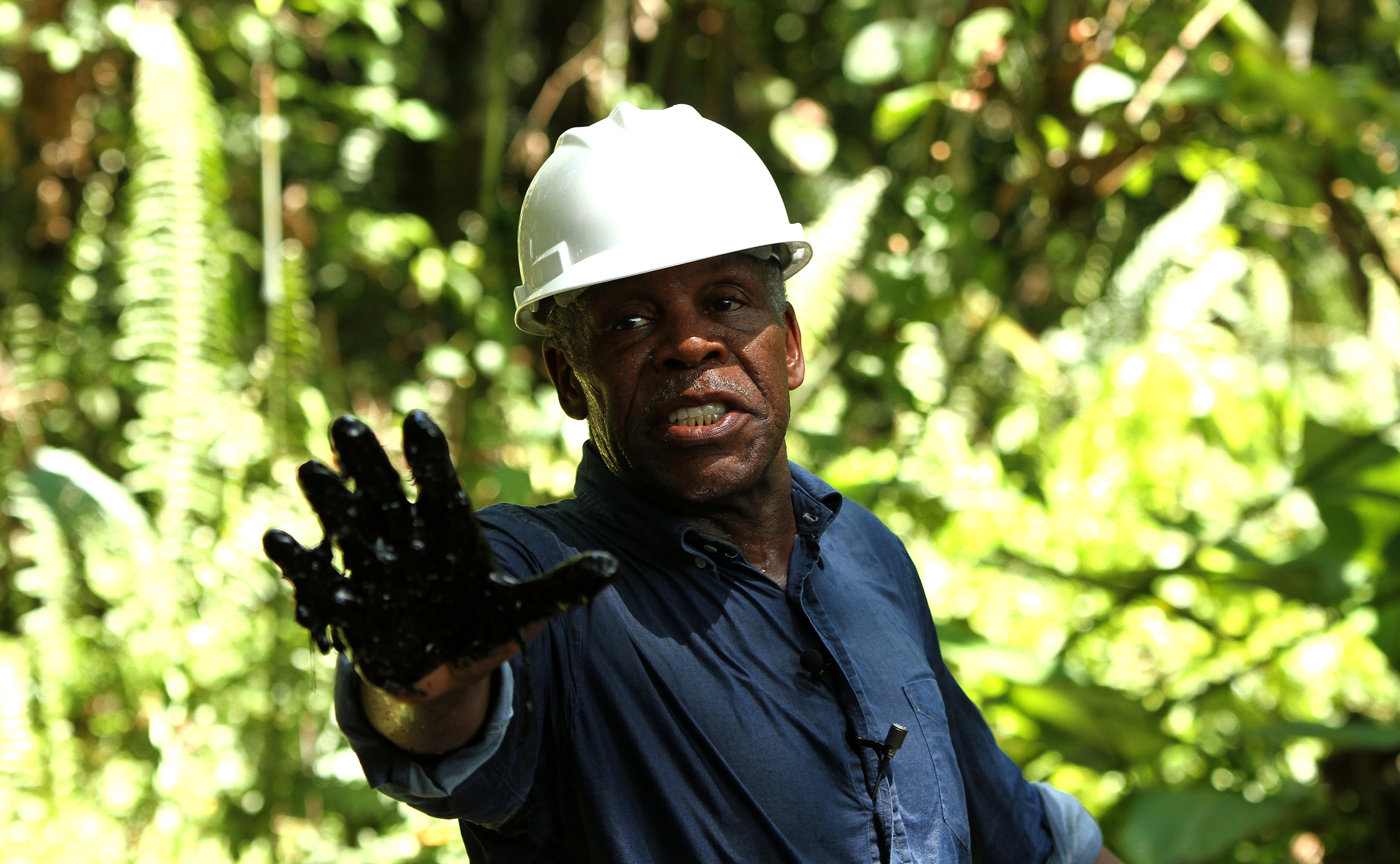
Glover in Ecuador in November 2013, protesting against Chevron and issues relating to the Lago Agrio oil field

==== Africa ====
Glover was a co-founder of Artists for a Free South Africa (later renamed Artists for a New South Africa) in 1989, along with a number of other Hollywood actors, including Alfre Woodard.

Glover is an active board member of the TransAfrica Forum.

On April 6, 2009, Glover was given a chieftaincy title in Imo State, Nigeria. His title, "Enyioma of Nkwerre", means A Good Friend in the language of the Igbo people of Eastern Nigeria.

==== Brazil ====
In 2018, Glover, as the UN Goodwill Ambassador, met with Lula to express solidarity and support for his presidential candidacy. During a trip to Brazil, he also met with the family of Marielle Franco, the City Council member and LGBT activist murdered in Rio de Janeiro.

==== Caribbean and Haiti ====
On January 13, 2010, Glover compared the scale and devastation of the 2010 Haiti earthquake to the predicament other island nations may face as a result of the failed Copenhagen summit the previous year. Glover said: "the threat of what happens to Haiti is a threat that can happen anywhere in the Caribbean to these island nations ... they're all in peril because of global warming ... because of climate change ... when we did what we did at the climate summit in Copenhagen, this is the response, this is what happens". In the same statement, he called for a new form of international partnership with Haiti and other Caribbean nations and praised Venezuela, Brazil and Cuba, for already accepting this partnership.

==== Iraq War ====
Glover had been an outspoken critic of the Iraq War before it began in March 2003. In February 2003, he was one of the featured speakers at Justin Herman Plaza in San Francisco where other notable speakers included names such as author Alice Walker, singer Joan Baez, United Farm Workers co-founder Dolores Huerta and Rep. Barbara Lee, D-Oakland. Glover was a signatory to the April 2003 anti-war letter "To the Conscience of the World" that criticized the unilateral American invasion of Iraq that led to "massive loss of civilian life" and "devastation of one of the cultural patrimonies of humanity".

During an anti-war demonstration in Downtown Oakland in March 2003, Glover praised the community leaders for their anti-war efforts saying that "They're on the front lines because they are trying to make a better America. ... The world has come together and said 'no' to this war—and we must stand with them."

==== Venezuela ====
In January 2006, Harry Belafonte led a delegation of activists, including Glover, activist/professor Cornel West, and activist/Santa Cruz Barrios Unidos Founder and Executive Director Daniel NANE Alejandrez in a meeting with President of Venezuela Hugo Chávez. In 2006, Glover had begun working on a film about Toussaint Louverture, who led the 18th century revolt in Haiti and, it was reported, that Chavez supported the film, "hoping the historical epic will sprinkle Hollywood stardust on his effort to mobilise world public opinion against imperialism and western oppression." In 2007, Glover agreed with Venezuelan President Hugo Chávez that the Touissant Louverture film would be financed by Venezuela. On May 19, 2007, the National Assembly of Venezuela approved giving Glover $18 million for the film. The following year, on April 9, 2008, the National Assembly of Venezuela, at the request of the Chávez, approved another $9 million to be handed to Glover in order to "continue" the filming of the film about Touissant. Surprisingly, in an interview dated January 5, 2015, published in Filmmaker magazine, Glover says, "The film that we always missed is a movie on the Haitian revolution and Toussaint Louverture. The company is fortuitously named after him and that was the movie that I wanted to do. We've developed a script. We thought we were going to get it done four years ago. We thought we were going to be making it right now. But also there are other kinds of things that intrigue me". As of 2026, the film had not been made.

Glover was also a board member of TeleSUR, a media network primarily funded by the Venezuelan government. During the beginning of the 2014 Venezuelan protests, Glover extended his support to Chávez's successor, President Nicolás Maduro, calling members of his government "the stewards" of Venezuela's democracy. Glover also told Venezuelan government supporters to go fight for the sovereignty of Maduro's government. Through the crisis in Bolivarian Venezuela, Glover continued to show his support for the Bolivarian government and President Maduro's administration.

==== Israel–Palestine ====
On September 2, 2009, Glover signed an open letter of objection to the inclusion of a series of films intended to showcase Tel Aviv without the participation of Palestinian filmmakers at the Toronto International Film Festival.

=== Music ===
Glover has become an active member of the board of directors of The Jazz Foundation of America. He became involved with The Jazz Foundation in 2005, and has been a featured host for their annual benefit A Great Night in Harlem for several years, as well appearing as a celebrity MC at other events for the foundation. In 2006, Britain's leading African theatre company Tiata Fahodzi appointed Glover as one of its three Patrons, joining Chiwetel Ejiofor and Jocelyn Jee Esien opening the organization's tenth-anniversary celebrations (February 2, 2008) at the Theatre Royal Stratford East, London.

== Awards and honours ==
In 2010, Glover delivered the Commencement Address and was awarded an honorary Doctor of Humane Letters degree from Utah State University.

He was also the recipient of a tribute paid by the Deauville American Film Festival in France on September 7, 2011.

Glover was awarded the Cuban National Medal of Friendship by the Cuban Council of State on December 29, 2016, in a ceremony in Havana for his solidarity with the Cuban 5 during their time of incarceration in the United States.

On March 25, 2022, the Academy of Motion Picture Arts and Sciences (AMPAS) presented Glover with the Jean Hersholt Humanitarian Award at the Governors Awards ceremony. In 2023, he was inducted into the Black Music & Entertainment Walk of Fame in Atlanta, Georgia. IndieWire named him one of the best actors never to have received an Academy Award nomination.

In May 2022, Glover was the keynote speaker at the University of Bridgeport's undergraduate and graduate commencement ceremonies and was awarded an honorary Doctor of Humane Letters degree at the ceremony.
