= Ian Yule =

British-born South African actor (1933–2020)

- Born: 1933; Great Britain
- Died: 3 December 2020 (age 87); Great Britain
- Occupations: soldier, actor, screenwriter

Ian Yule (1933 – 3 December 2020) was a British born South African actor and soldier. He had a film career that commenced in the late 1960s and lasted to around the early to mid 2000s. Many of the roles he has played are that of a soldier. The films he has appeared in include Killer Force, in 1976, One Way also released in 1976, Golden Rendezvous in 1977, The Wild Geese in 1978, Zulu Dawn in 1979, —Safari 3000 in 1982, City of Blood in 1983, and many more. He was also a stuntman in a few films. He also was a screenwriter and wrote some screen plays including Shamwari in which he starred opposite Ken Gampu. He was a well known actor in South Africa.

== Background ==
Ian Yule was born in the UK some time before the second world war. During his career he was a member of the British Army's Royal Artillery, Parachute Regiment and Special Air Service and served in the Korean War, taking part in the Battle of Inchon and Battle of Chosin Reservoir, and later served in the Rhodesian Security Forces and South African Defence Force as well as serving as a mercenary in Mad Mike Hoare's outfit (the film the Wild Geese is based on Hoare's exploits). As an actor in the action genre he was recognised for his accomplishments.

== Film career ==
=== 1950s–1960s ===
Yule's first association with films goes back to the 1950s when he had a role as a stuntman in the 1959 film Ben-Hur. He also did stunt work in The Longest Day which was released in 1962. His early acting roles included playing the part of Andy Wilson in 1967 film Wild Season which was directed by Emil Nofal. In 1968, he had a recurring role as Freddy in the television series Schatzsucher unserer Tage which was directed by Rolf von Sydow.

=== 1970s–1980s ===
He played the part of Trooper Dillon in the David Millin directed Shangani Patrol which was released in 1970. In the 1978 Wild Geese, playing the part of Sgt. Tosh Donaldson, he was part of a cast that included Richard Burton, Roger Moore and Richard Harris.

Starring opposite Ken Gampu, he appeared in the 1982 film Shamwari. The film bore a similarity to an earlier film, The Defiant Ones that starred Sidney Poitier and Tony Curtis. Like the characters in that film, there is racial hatred between the two of them. They escape from a chain gang detail. To survive they have to get rid of their hatred for each other. Yule was led to believe that the film was a flop, however John Hume who produced the film was marketing it under a different name and making money from it.

In 1986, he appeared as Bill Smith in the film Jake Speed. He played the part of Max Wharton in the 1988 film, City of Blood.

=== 1990s–2000s ===
He played the part of Harvey in the 1995 film Cyborg Cop III which was directed by Yossi Wein. In the 1999 film Operation Delta Force 3: Clear Target, he played the part of General Hightower.

Possibly his last film was Platinum which was released in 2004.

== Later years ==
In mid-December 2015, Yule arrived at Heathrow Airport from South Africa, in poor health and destitute. He had a carry bag, his knobkerrie walking sticks and a couple of shirts and underwear. He was met and collected from the airport by a volunteer, who had been moved by his plight and subsequently cared for him for some two months.

After being helped by one organisation, the South African Legion, the SSAFA were instrumental in getting him the care he required for his heart problems and severe arthritis. He was later hospitalised at St Richard's Hospital in Chichester where he died on 3 December 2020.

== Filmography ==
FilmActor
Title	Year	Role	Director	Notes
Wild Season	1967	Andy Wilson	Emil Nofal	
The Professor and the Beauty Queen	1967	Ed, henchman 2	Jamie Uys	
Dr Kalie	1968	Wall of Death barker	Ivan Hall	
Majuba: Heuwel van Duiwe	1968	Deserter	David Millin	
Danie Bosman: Die verhaal van die grootste S.A. komponis	1969	Patrick, barman	Elmo de Witt	
Scotty & Co.	1970	Snowy	Peter Henkel	
Stop Exchange	1970	Lefty	Howard Rennie	
Satan's Harvest	1970	Jonas Wade / Jake Wade	George Montgomery	
Banana Beach	1970		David Millin	
Shangani Patrol	1970	Trooper Dillon	David Millin	
Vengeance Cops	1971	Con Cavallas	Ivan Hall	
Die Banneling	1971	Dekker	David Millin	
The Winners	1972	Andy Wilson	Emil Nofal, Roy Sargeant	
Dog Squad	1973	Andy Wilson	Tim Spring	
The Big Game	1973	Task Force Leader	Robert Day	
Vreemde Wêreld	1974	Homicidal mental patient	Jürgen Goslar	
Olie Kolonie	1975		Neil Hetherington	
Sell A Million	1975	Knuckles	Ian Hamilton	
De Wet's Spoor	1975	Maj. Coleridge	Howard Rennie	
Killer Force	1976	Edward Woods	Val Guest	
One Way	1976	Stiffy	Sidney Hayers	
My Way II	1972		Jans Rautenbach	
Golden Rendezvous	1977	McCloskey	Ashley Lazarus	
Mister Deathman	1977	Bill	Michael D. Moore	
The Wild Geese	1978	Tosh Donaldson	Andrew V. McLaglen	
Zulu Dawn	1979	Cpl. Fields	Douglas Hickox	
Shamwari	1982	Bill Matthews	Clive Harding	
Safari 3000	1982	Freddie Selkirk	Harry Hurwitz	
For King and Country	1983	Sergeant Major	Bob Hird	TV movie
The Lion's Share	1985	Scotty	Norman Cohen	Voice, Uncredited
Jake Speed	1986	Bill Smith	Andrew Lane	
City of Blood	1987	Max Wharton	Darrell Roodt	
Rage to Kill	1988	Roy Slade	David Winters	
Diamond in the Rough	1988	Ian	Richard Oleksiak	
River of Death	1989	Long John Silver	Steve Carver	
Accidents	1989	Warren Zimmer	Gideon Amir	
Young Survivors	1990	Ginger	Douglas Bristow	TV movie
The Lost World	1992	Peterson	Timothy Bond	
Return to the Lost World	1992	Peterson	Timothy Bond	
Point of Impact	1993	Martin Cullen	Bob Misiorowski	
Dark Desires: Thelma	1994	Sam Garfield	Jean-Louis Daniel	TV movie
Lunarcop	1995	Lester	Boaz Davidson	
Cyborg Cop III	1995	Harvey Cartel	Yossi Wein	
Warhead	1996	Colonel No. 1	Mark Roper	
Orion's Key	1996	Odd Job	Mark Roper	
Ernest Goes to Africa	1997	Ol' Man at Flea Market	John R. Cherry III	
Merchant of Death	1997	Carl Pembroke	Yossi Wein	
Black Velvet Band	1998	Yeoman Warder	Robert Knights	TV movie
Operation Delta Force 3: Clear Target	1998	General Alan Hightower	Mark Roper	
Cold Harvest	1999	Marshall	Isaac Florentine	
Traitor's Heart	1999	Jack (barman)	Danny Lerner	
Die Spesenritter	1999		Jörg Grünler	TV movie
Zugvögel der Liebe	2001	George	Richard Engel	TV movie
Check-in to Disaster	2001	Wim Vanderbourgh	Uwe Frießner	TV movie
Platinum	2004	Land Owner, Madagascar	Martin Enlen	TV movie (final film role)

FilmsWriter
Title	Year	Role	Director	Notes #
Shamwari	1982	story and screenplay	Clive Harding	
Space Mutiny	1988	Writer (uncredited)	David Winters	
Rage to Kill	1988	Co-writer	David Winters	
Return to Justice	1990	Original screenplay	Vincent G. Cox	
Tolla is Tops	1990	Co-writer	Elmo de Witt	
River of Diamonds	1991	Co-writer	Robert J. Smawley	

TelevisionActor
Title	Episode	Year	Role	Director	Notes #
Schatzsucher unserer Tage	Der gelbe Aktenkoffer	1968	Freddy	Rolf von Sydow	
Schatzsucher unserer Tage	Schüsse in der Savanne	1968	Freddy	Rolf von Sydow	
Schatzsucher unserer Tage	Die Farm der Mrs. Collins	1968	Freddy	Rolf von Sydow	
Schatzsucher unserer Tage	Die Polizeipatrouille	1968	Freddy	Rolf von Sydow	
Schatzsucher unserer Tage	Der große Fund	1968	Freddy	Rolf von Sydow	
Schatzsucher unserer Tage	Die Hängebrücke	1968	Freddy	Rolf von Sydow	
Schatzsucher unserer Tage	Rivalen	1968	Freddy	Rolf von Sydow	
Schatzsucher unserer Tage	Öl im Kral	1968	Freddy	Rolf von Sydow	
Schatzsucher unserer Tage	Die einsame Insel	1968	Freddy	Rolf von Sydow	
Schatzsucher unserer Tage	Notruf aus der Teufelsschlucht	1968	Freddy	Rolf von Sydow	
Schatzsucher unserer Tage	Die Geisterstadt	1968	Freddy	Rolf von Sydow	
Schatzsucher unserer Tage	Gefährliche Heimkehr	1968	Freddy	Rolf von Sydow	
Dr. med. Mark Wedmann – Detektiv inbegriffen	Station ohne Hoffnung	1974	Jack	Alfredo Medori	
Härte 10	Piet	1975		Gordon Flemyng	Mini series
John Ralling – Abenteuer um Diamanten	In jenen frühen Tagen	1975		Erich Neureuther	
Les diamants du président	?	1977		Claude Boissol	Mini series
The Riverman	?	1983	Jim	Ivan Hall	Mini series
1922		1984	Ivan Macready	Edgar Bold	
Auf Achse	Konvoi	1983	Georg	Hartmut Griesmayr	
Tarzan: The Epic Adventures	Tarzan and the Moon God	1997	Manian	William Tannen	
