= Shaina (film) =

2020 Zimbabwean television film

- Written by: Wanisai Chigwendere
- Directed by: Beautie Masvaure Alt
- Starring: Wilmah Munemera; Tinodiwanashe Chitma; Gamu Mukwakwami; Tarumbidwa Chirume; Joylene Malenga
- Country of origin: Zimbabwe
- Original language: English

Production
- Producer: Siphiwe Hlabangane
- Cinematography: Tom Marais
- Editor: Melanie Jankes Golden
- Running time: 97 minutes
- Production company: Quizzical Pictures

Original release
- Release: 21 August 2020

Shaina is a 2020 Zimbabwean television film directed by Beautie Masvaure Alt and produced by Siphiwe Hlabangane. The film stars Wilmah Munemera with Tinodiwanashe Chitma, Gamu Mukwakwami, Tarumbidwa Chirume, and Joylene Malenga in supporting roles. The film is about a Zimbabwean teenager Shaina, and group of friends who encounter life-changing obstacles which they deal with forgiveness and friendship.

The film made its premier on 21 August 2020 on ZBC-TV. The film received positive reviews from critics. The film was produced through the support of the United States Agency for International Development (USAID). The film was also nominated for the Peabody Awards for Public Service. The film is largely made as an awareness program to give health messages on key issues such as poverty, pregnancy, maternal and child health, gender-based violence, malaria, and tuberculosis.

== Cast ==
- Wilmah Munemera as Shaina
- Tinodiwanashe Chitma as Zo
- Gamu Mukwakwami as Stella
- Tarumbidwa Chirume as Busi
- Joylene Malenga as Miss Muzondo
- Tadiwa Marowa as Faro
- Charmaine Mujeri as Mai Faro
- Tongai Sammy T. Mundawarara as Constable Mathius
- Jesesi Mungoshi as Ambuya
- Eddie Sandifolo as Simba
- Fadzai Simango as Brian
- Kubi Indi as Rooster Gogo
