= Jesesi Mungoshi =

Zimbabwean actress (born 1954)

- Born: Jesesi Mungoshi; 7 July 1954 (age 72); Masvingo, Zimbabwe
- Occupation: Actress
- Years active: 1985–present
- Known for: Cook Off (2017); Neria (1991)
- Spouse: Charles Mungoshi
- Children: 5

Jesesi Mungoshi (also Jesese Mungoshi) (born 7 July 1954) is a Zimbabwean actress. She made her debut appearance in 1989, in the film titled, African Journey.

== Career ==
In an early appearance, Mungoshi was featured in the 1989 version and the subsequent 1990 two-part of George Bloomfield's television family film, African Journey, which also starred: Jason Blicker, Katja Blomquist, Allan Jordan, Ulla Mahaka and others.

In 1991, she was featured in Godwin Mawuru's film titled, Neria, in which she played the lead role of "Neria". Other cast members include Dominic Kanaveli and Violet Ndlovu amongst others.

Also, she was featured in the 1993 short film by Farai Sevenzo titled, Rwendo, starring Yemi Goodman Ajibade, Ben Daniels, Eldinah Tshatedi and Frank Windsor.

In 2017, she made an appearance in the comedy-romance film, Cook Off, directed by Tomas Brickhill, in which she played a leading role as "Gogo". The film, being the first produced in Zimbabwe after the long regime of Robert Mugabe, was premiered in The UK on 27 July 2019.

In recognition of her contributions to the Zimbabwean film industry, she was honoured with a Lifetime Achievement Award by the Great Zimbabwe University in May 2017 in Masvingo.

The 2020 film, Shaina, in which she alongside other Zimbabwean cast like: Marian Kunonga, Charmaine Mujeri and others were featured, received much praise abroad.

== Filmography ==
Year	Film	Role	Notes	Ref.
2020	Shaina	Actress (Ambuya)		
2019	Familiar	Actress	Play	
2017	Cook Off	Actress (Gogo)	Comedy, Romance	
1993	Rwendo	Actress	Short film, Drama	
1991	Neria	Actress (Neria)	Drama	
1989 and 1990	African Journey	Actress (Themba)	TV movie, Family	

== Accolades ==
Year	Event/Issuer	Prize	Recipient	Result
2017	GZU	Lifetime Achievement Award	Herself	Won

== Personal life ==
She was married to Zimbabwean writer, actor and poet, Charles Mungoshi, who, according to The Zimbabwe Mail and This is Africa reporters, died on 16 February 2019 in Harare, Zimbabwe after a 10-year long illness at 71. They had five children: Farai, Graham, Nyasha, Charles, and Tsitsi, and at the time of his death they had seven grandchildren. The couple alongside their son, Farai were all into filmmaking.
