= Vreemde Wêreld =

1974 South African drama film

- Directed by: Jürgen Goslar
- Starring: Sandra Prinsloo; Wolfgang Kieling; Ian Yule; Brian O'Shaughnessy
- Music by: Hennie Bekter
- Release date: 23 September 1974
- Running time: 91 minutes
- Countries: South Africa; West Germany
- Languages: Afrikaans; German

Vreemde Wêreld is a 1974 South African German bilingual crime drama film written and directed by Jürgen Goslar. The plot of the film was adopted from a novel titled "Entmündigt" which was written by a popular novelist Heinz G. Konsalik.

== Cast ==
- Sandra Prinsloo as Gisela Pelzer
- Wolfgang Kieling as Iwan Elzer
- Ian Yule
- Brian O'Shaughnessy as Dr. Page
- Marius Weyers as Clark Burton
- Richard Loring as George Harding
- Siegfried Mynhardt as Professor von Maggfelt
- Cobus Rossouw as Dr. Vrobel
