= One Away (film) =

1976 film by Sidney Hayers

- VHS cover
- Directed by: Sidney Hayers
- Written by: Allan Prior
- Based on: One Away by Allan Prior
- Starring: Patrick Mower; Bradford Dillman; Elke Sommer; Dean Stockwell; Roberta Durrant
- Cinematography: Graham Edgar
- Edited by: John D. Guthridge
- Music by: Ron Grainer
- Production company: Silhouette Film Productions
- Release date: January 1, 1976
- Running time: 96 minutes
- Country: United States
- Language: English

One Away is a 1976 American action film directed by Sidney Hayers and starring Patrick Mower, Bradford Dillman, Roberta Durrant and Elke Sommer. The film is written by Allan Prior and is based on his novel of the same name.

== Plot ==
Two men help their brother escape from a South African jail, sparking a motorcycle manhunt across the local wilderness.

== Cast ==
- Patrick Mower as Tam Bass
- Bradford Dillman as Ruben Bass
- Elke Sommer as Elsa
- Dean Stockwell as Pete Bass
- Roberta Durrant as Olwen
- Ian Yule as Stiffy
- Erica Rogers as Dot Bass
- Gordon Mulholland as Detective, 'Big man'
- Patrick Mynhardt as Chief warder
- Stuart Parker as Warder
- Colin Abraham as Convict
- Errol Ross as First Warder (Quarry)
