= Inda (surname) =

Inda is a surname, and may refer to:

- Alberto Suárez Inda (born 1939), Mexican cardinal
- Eduardo Inda (born 1967), Spanish journalist
- Stella Inda (1924–1995), Mexican actress

== See also ==
- Ind (surname)
