= David Mungoshi =

Zimbabwean novelist (1949–2020)

- Born: David Sunsly Mungoshi; 30 September 1949; Bulawayo, Southern Rhodesia
- Died: 29 August 2020 (aged 70); Harare, Zimbabwe
- Education: University of Rhodesia
- Occupations: novelist, poet
- Relatives: Charles Mungoshi

David Sunsly Mungoshi (30 September 1949 – 29 August 2020) was a Zimbabwean novelist, actor, poet and teacher.

== Early life ==
He was born in 1949 in Bulawayo, Zimbabwe and was fluent in Shona, Ndebele and English. He learnt Zulu, similar to Ndebele, which at that time was not recognised as a distinct language, at school.

== Career ==
In 1970, he started teaching at St Annes Goto Primary School in Hwedza. He struggled at the start of his writing career, with some believing that he was writing simply because his brother, the then established Charles Mungoshi, was writing, or that his brother had even written them. In 1975, he enrolled for a BA in English and History at the University of Rhodesia. Mungoshi was a teacher for most of his life, and taught at various institutions, including the University of Zimbabwe.

Mungoshi was also an actor, and until 2011 featured in the local soap opera Studio 263, as well as the short film, The Postman, and the feature film Secrets.

He lived in Gweru after his retirement.

== Awards ==
He won the 2010 National Arts Merit Awards Outstanding Fiction Book for The Fading Sun

== Family ==
He is the brother of Charles Mungoshi.

== Death ==
He died on 29 August 2020.

== Bibliography ==
- Stains on the Wall (1992)
- Live like an Artist
- Broken Dream And Other Stories
- The Fading Sun (2009)
