= Sam Mtukudzi =

Zimbabwean musician (1988–2010)

- Born: April 1, 1988
- Died: March 15, 2010 (aged 21)
- Citizenship: Zimbabwean
- Occupation: Musician

Sam Mtukudzi (April 1, 1988 – March 15, 2010) was a Zimbabwean musician. He was the son of the late singer Oliver Mtukudzi.

== Early life and career ==
After graduating high school, Sam joined his father on tours playing the saxophone and a guitar. In Harare, he had his own jazz-influenced band called Ay Band with whom he recorded his debut album, Rume Rimwe, in 2008. He also had recorded two solo albums. The elder Mtukudzi introduced Sam as "the future" to appreciative crowds at a British nightclub in late 2009.

== Death ==
In the early hours of Monday, March 15, 2010, Sam and his sound engineer, Owen Chimhare, died in a car crash while traveling back to Norton near Harare. Their Tata pickup truck, driven by Chimhare, struck a bridge just before the Kuwadzana Extension off-ramp along the Harare-Norton road. The vehicle veered off the road, rammed into the right side of the bridge's guard rails, and plunged into the river bank below. Inspector Tigere Chigome, a national Traffic Police spokesman, explained in the news that the accident happened at 1:20 am. Both Mtukudzi and Chimhare died of head injuries on the scene.

Sam Mtukudzi was an ambassador in the Dance4Life initiative whose national concept owner is Students Partnership Worldwide in Zimbabwe (SPW Zimbabwe). The initiative seeks to fight HIV and the stigma surrounding it through music and dance. It is being run in several countries namely South Africa, The Netherlands, Kenya, Zambia, Tanzania, UK, US and Russia among others. Mtukudzi was identified as an ambassador by Luckmore Jalisi from SPW Zimbabwe due to his youthfulness as well as his focus and maturity in music.

His father Oliver Mtukudzi died on January 23, 2019. The burial occurred on January 27, 2019.
