= Neria (film) =

- Movie Poster
- Directed by: Godwin Mawuru
- Written by: Louise Riber
- Story by: Tsitsi Dangarembga
- Produced by: John Riber; Louise Riber
- Starring: Jesese Mungoshi; Anthony Chinyanga; Dominic Kanaventi; Kubi Indi; Oliver Mtukudzi
- Cinematography: John Riber
- Edited by: Louise Riber
- Music by: Oliver Mtukudzi
- Production company: Media for Development International
- Distributed by: KJM3 Entertainment Group
- Release date: 1991 (Zimbabwe)
- Running time: 103 minutes
- Country: Zimbabwe
- Language: English

Neria is a Zimbabwean film made in 1993, written by the novelist Tsitsi Dangarembga. It is directed by Godwin Mawuru and the screenplay was written by Louise Riber. It is the highest-grossing film in Zimbabwean history.

The film concerns the struggles of a woman in a suburb of the capital; Harare, Warren Park, in Zimbabwe when she is widowed after her husband is killed in an accident. Her husband's older brother takes advantage of the death of his younger brother, and uses the inheritance for self-benefit at the expense of Neria and her two children. Its soundtrack, Neria remains one of the most celebrated Zimbabwean songs. The soundtrack of the film was sung by Oliver Mtukudzi.

== Plot ==
Harare, 1990. Neria and Patrick, a married couple, both work and earn money in the city and live a modern egalitarian lifestyle. But when Patrick is killed in an accident, his family uses traditional Shona custom to deprive Neria of her property and children.The film starts showing Neria and Patrick enjoying a modern life in the city with their two children. The couple goes to visit their family in the rural where they are persuaded by Patrick's mother to stay home rather than in the suburbs away from the rest of the family. Patrick objects stating that he and Neria have built a home in the suburb and their life belongs there. Back in the city, Patrick's car refuses to start as he wants to go to work, he then uses the bicycle instead. On his way from work his bicycle is hit by a truck and he dies on the spot.

== Cast ==
- Anthony Chinyanga (Mr. Chigwanzi)
- Dominic Kanaventi (Phineas)
- Claude Maredza (Mr. Machacha)
- Emmanuel Mbirimi (Patrick)
- Jesese Mungoshi (Neria)
- Violet Ndlovu (Ambuya)
- Sharon Malujlo (Canadian Tourist)
- Oliver Mtukudzi (Jethro)
- Kubi Indi (Connie)
- Garikai Mudzamiri

== Release ==
Neria was released in 1991. The VHS went on sale in July 1992.

Neria won the Best Soundtrack award from South African station M-Net in 1992.

Neria was released in the United States in 1993, which is why it is sometimes erroneously given the date of 1993. The Chicago Tribune gave it two and a half stars.

== Neria Remake 2024 ==
A remake of the film, titled Neria 21, was released in March 2024 on Rawsoot Studios' YouTube channel. The new version reprises the theme of the challenges and injustices women face, though now in the context of the 21st century and the modern digital age.
