= Mandela (1987 film) =

1987 British television film

- Genre: Drama
- Screenplay by: Ronald Harwood
- Directed by: Philip Saville
- Starring: Danny Glover; Alfre Woodard
- Theme music composer: Richard Hartley
- Country of origin: United Kingdom
- Original language: English

Production
- Executive producers: Robert Berger; Herbert Brodkin
- Producer: Dickie Bamber
- Production location: Zimbabwe
- Cinematography: John Coquillon
- Editor: Ralph Sheldon
- Running time: 135 minutes
- Production companies: Polymuse Productions; Titus Productions; HBO Pictures

Original release
- Network: HBO
- Release: 20 September 1987

Mandela is a 1987 British television drama film directed by Philip Saville and written by Ronald Harwood. The film stars Danny Glover as Nelson Mandela and Alfre Woodard as his wife Winnie. The film premiered on HBO on 20 September 1987.

== Cast ==
- Danny Glover as Nelson Mandela
- Alfre Woodard as Winnie Madikizela-Mandela
- John Matshikiza as Walter Sisulu
- John Indi as Oliver Tambo
- Juanita Waterman as Adelaide Tambo
- Saul Reichlin as Bram Fischer
- Xoliswa Sithole as Zindzi Mandela
- Gertrude Rook as Zeni Mandela
- Nathan Dambuza Mdledle as Albert Luthuli
- Mike Phillips as Denis Goldberg
- John Indi as Bamuthi
