= Ken Gampu =

South African actor (1929–2003)

- Born: 28 August 1929; Germiston, South Africa
- Died: 4 November 2003 (aged 74); Vosloorus, South Africa
- Occupation: Actor
- Years active: 1958 - 2001
- Spouse: Violet

Ken Gampu (Germiston, 28 August 1929 – Vosloorus, 4 November 2003) was a South African film, television and theatre actor.

== Background ==
Gampu was the son of Morrison Gampu, a former Bantu government interpreter who later became an actor himself.

== Career ==
Before he began his career, Gampu was a physical training instructor, salesman, interpreter and police officer. Gampu's first acting role was in Athol Fugard's play, No Good Friday (1958). His big break came in the 1965 film Dingaka by Jamie Uys. The same year, he had a significant role in Cornel Wilde's African adventure film, The Naked Prey.

In the 1973 action film, Joe Bullet, Gampu was featured in the lead role playing the part of a strong action man, Joe Bullet. The character was described by The Guardian as being modelled on something between Shaft and James Bond. Bullet drank alcohol, drove sports cars, did karate, threw knives and climbed up mineshafts. It was independently released in 1973, and it played at the Eyethu cinema in Soweto. It was screened twice then the film was banned. This was done because the South African government at the time were concerned how it might influence the aspirations of black South Africans. For about 40 years the original film reels were stored in a box in the back of producer Tonie van der Merwe's garage gathering dust. He hung on to the reels during the course of 40 years. Channel24.co.za announced on January 24, 2017, that after 44 years of absence, the film was to be screened at the Bioscope Independent Cinema in Johannesburg on January 24 and at The Company Gardens in Cape Town on January 25.

In Death of a Snowman, Gampu played a no-nonsense beat reporter trying to get the scoop on mysterious Mr. X. He is aided by a detective friend he has on the police force, played by Nigel Davenport. Playing the part of Khumalo, Gampu co-starred with Ian Yule and Tamara Franke in the 1982 film Shamwari.

== Filmography ==
Year	Title	Role	Notes
1961	Tremor		
1961	The Hellions	Kanna	Uncredited
1964	Dingaka	Ntuku Makwena	
1965	The Naked Prey	Leader of the Warriors	
1966	All the Way to Paris	Sudanese Delegate at Conference	Uncredited
1972	Rogue Lion	Mashoda	
1973	Joe Bullet	Joe Bullet	
1974	Pens en Pootjies	Diamond seller	
1974	La diosa virgen	Gampu	
1975	Forever Young, Forever Free	Thomas Luke	
1976	Death of a Snowman	Chaka	
1977	Target of an Assassin	Minister Manga	
1977	Mister Deathman	Sue	
1978	Slavers	Musulma	
1978	The Wild Geese	Alexander	
1979	Zulu Dawn	Mantshonga	
1979	King Solomon's Treasure	Umpslopogas	
1979	Game for Vultures	Sixpence	
1980	The Gods Must Be Crazy	President	
1980	Flashpoint Africa	Matari (Eddie Nkoya)	
1981	Kill and Kill Again	Gorilla	
1982	Shamwari	Khumalo	
1982	Bullet on the Run	Joe Bullet	
1982	Tuxedo Warrior	Inspector Nderi	
1985	Morenga	Morenga	
1985	Van der Merwe P.I.	Wiley	
1985	King Solomon's Mines	Umbopo	
1986	Jake Speed	Joe Smith	
1987	Scavengers	Dr. Nduma	
1987	Operation Hit Squad	Ken	
1987	City of Blood	Black Leader	
1988	The Emissary	Beamish	
1988	Diamonds High	Zwide	
1988	Bush Shrink	Gapu	
1988	Act of Piracy	Herb Bunting	
1988	The Rutanga Tapes	President Mbule	
1989	Enemy Unseen	Malanga	
1989	Laser Mission	Hotel Clerk	Uncredited
1990	American Ninja 4: The Annihilation	Dr. Tamba	
1990	Voice in the Dark	Caxton	
1990	Fatal Mission	President Tembu	
1990	Kwagga Strikes Back	Tjicombo	
1992	Lethal Ninja	Ndumo	
1994	The Air Up There	Itumbo	
1994	Cyborg Cop II	Police Chief	
1995	Hearts & Minds	Chopper-Xuza	
1996	Le complot d'Aristote	Policeman	
1997	Fools	Elder 1	
1999	A Reasonable Man	Headman	
2001	Malunde	Baba Gusha	
2001	Askari	Ndhlovu	(final film role)
