= Bona Magazine =

South African magazine

- Categories: fashion, beauty, health, relationships, and entertainment
- Frequency: Monthly
- Publisher: Habari Media
- First issue: 1956
- Country: South Africa
- Language: English, isiXhosa, isiZulu, seSotho
- Website: bona.co.za

Bona Magazine is a South African lifestyle magazine, first published in 1956. It covers a wide range of topics, including fashion, beauty, health, relationships, and entertainment. Bona has a wide readership in South Africa, and is also sold in Namibia, Botswana, Lesotho, Zimbabwe, Malawi and Mauritius.

== History ==
It was founded by the Hyman family in 1956. and incorporated South Africa’s first black magazine, Zonk! (founded in 1949), in 1964. The magazine celebrated its 50th anniversary in 2006. Its first editions were published in English, but it later expanded into Xhosa, Zulu and Sotho to reach a broader audience. To reduce costs, Bona uses a "black plate exchange" method for printing multiple language editions.

== Ownership ==
Bona Magazine was owned by Caxton and CTP Publishers and Printers, a major South African publishing company. In May 2020, Caxton announced its withdrawal from magazine publishing, which led to the temporary closure of Bona.

In August 2022, Highbury Media, operating under the name Habari Media, acquired the rights to publish Bona, marking its revival after the closure under Caxton's ownership.
