= Oliver Mtukudzi =

Zimbabwean musician (1952–2019)

Oliver "Tuku" Mtukudzi
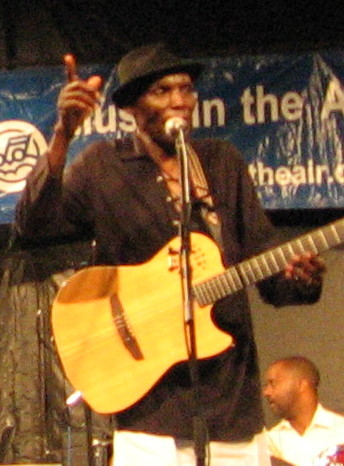

Background information
- Born: 22 September 1952; Highfield, Southern Rhodesia (modern-day Harare, Zimbabwe)
- Died: 23 January 2019 (aged 66) Harare, Zimbabwe
- Genres: Afro Jazz / Tuku Music
- Instrument: Guitar
- Years active: 1977–2019

Oliver "Tuku" Mtukudzi (22 September 1952 – 23 January 2019) was a Zimbabwean musician, businessman, philanthropist, human rights activist and UNICEF Goodwill Ambassador for the Southern Africa Region.

== Career ==
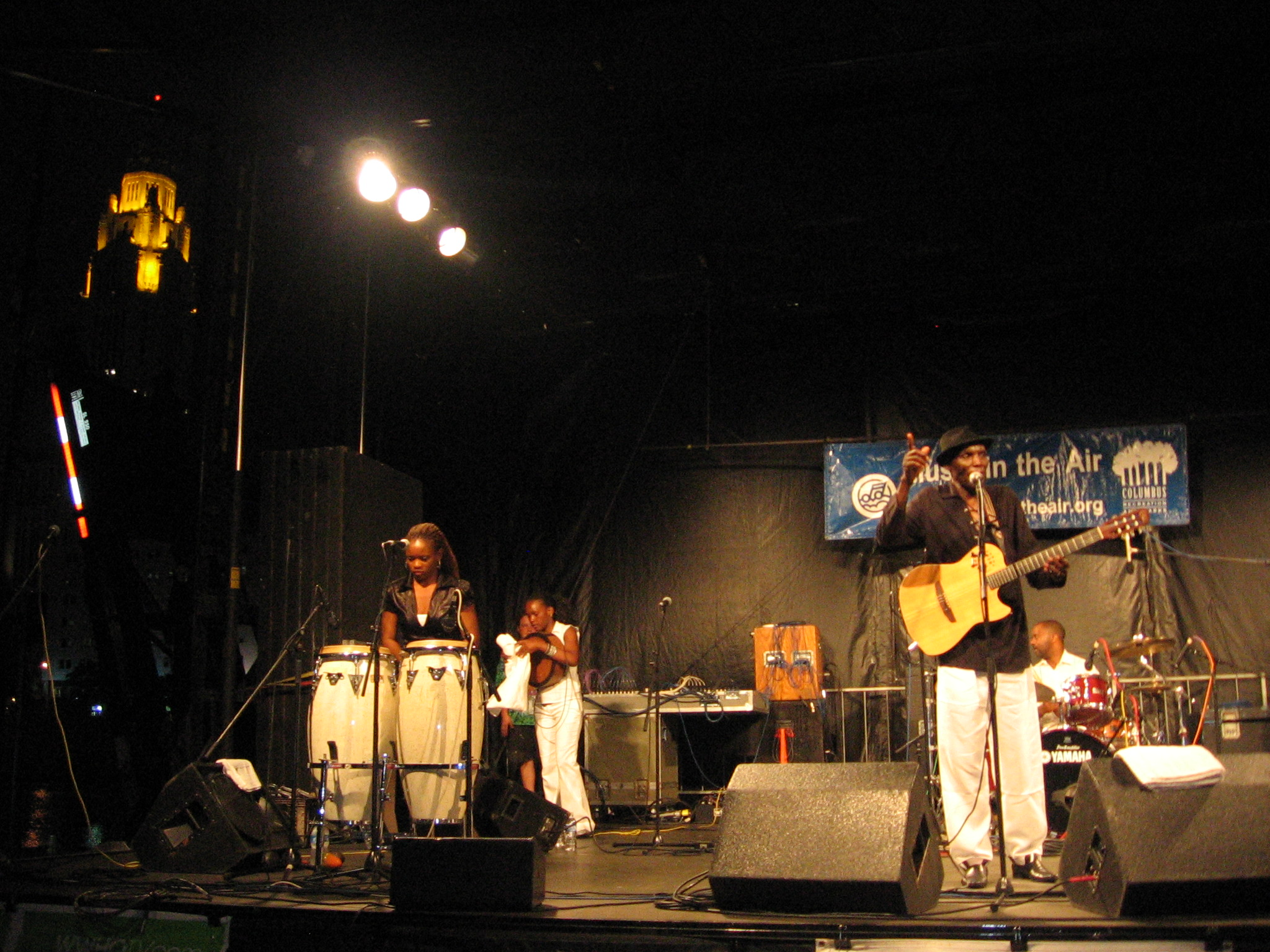
Oliver Mtukudzi and the Black Spirits

Mtukudzi grew up in Highfield, in Salisbury (modern-day Harare) in Southern Rhodesia. He began performing in 1977 when he joined the Wagon Wheels, a band that also featured Thomas Mapfumo and fellow guitarist James Chimombe. They were given the rare opportunity by Paul Tangi Mhova Mkondo, an African nationalist and music promotor, who provided money and resources to the group. He allowed them to perform at Club Mutanga (Pungwe) which, at the time, was the only night club available for blacks under Rhodesia's policy of segregation. Their single Dzandimomotera went gold and Tuku's first album followed, which was also a major success. Mtukudzi was also a contributor to Mahube, Southern Africa's "supergroup".

With his husky voice, Mtukudzi became the most recognised voice to emerge from Zimbabwe and onto the international scene and he earned a devoted following across Africa and beyond. A member of Zimbabwe's KoreKore group, with Nzou Samanyanga as his totem, he sang in the nation's dominant Shona language along with Ndebele and English. He also incorporated elements of different musical traditions, giving his music a distinctive style, known to fans as Tuku Music.

Mtukudzi had a number of tours around the world. He was on several tours in the UK, US and Canada to perform for large audiences. In 2017 Mtukudzi entertained guests at the wedding of Zimbabwean businessman Wicknell Chivayo.

== Social commentary ==
Prior to the independence of Zimbabwe, Mtukudzi's music depicted the struggles under Rhodesian white minority rule. In subsequent years following Zimbabwean independence, his music has advocated for tolerance and peace and has frequently portrayed the struggles of women and children.

== Personal life and death ==
Mtukudzi was the father of six children (with four different women) and had three grandchildren. His son Sam Mtukudzi, a successful musician in his own right, died in a car accident in March 2010. In 2013, Mtukudzi released an album titled "Sarawoga", in tribute to his son. His daughter Selmor is also a musician and works with UNICEF.

On 23 January 2019, Mtukudzi died at the age of 66 at Avenues Clinic in Harare, Zimbabwe, after a long battle with diabetes mellitus.

== Discography ==
Albums:

- (1978) Ndipeiwo Zano (re-released 2000)
- (1979) Chokwadi Chichabuda
- (1980) Muroyi Ndiani
- (1980) Africa (re-released 2000)
- (1981) Shanje
- (1981) Pfambi
- (1982) Maungira
- (1982) Please Ndapota
- (1983) Nzara
- (1984) Hwema Handirase
- (1985) Mhaka
- (1986) Gona
- (1986) Zvauya Sei?
- (1987) Wawona
- (1988) Nyanga Yenzou
- (1988) Strange, Isn't It?
- (1988) Sugar Pie
- (1989) Grandpa Story
- (1990) Ndotomuimbira
- (1990) Chikonzi
- (1990) Shoko
- (1991) Mutorwa
- (1991) Kuvhaira
- (1992) Rombe
- (1992) Rumbidzai Jehova
- (1992) Neria soundtrack
- (1994) Ziwere MuKobenhavn
- (1994) Pfugama Unamate
- (1995) Was My Child
- (1996) Svovi Yangu
- (1995) The Other Side (live album in Switzerland)
- (1995) Ivai Navo
- (1997) Ndega Zvangu (re-released 2001)
- (1997) Chinhambwe
- (1999) Tuku Music
- (1999) Paivepo
- (2001) Bvuma ("Tolerance")
- (2002) Shanda soundtrack
- (2002) Vhunze Moto
- (2003) Shanda (Alula Records)
- (2003) Tsivo ("Revenge")
- (2005) Nhava
- (2007) Tsimba Itsoka
- (2008) Dairai
- (2011) Rudaviro
- (2011) Abi'angu ("Duets of My Time")
- (2012) Sarawoga
- (2014) Mukombe Wemvura
- (2016) Eheka! Nhai Yahwe
- (2018) hany'a ("Concern")

Singles:

- (1978) Chido Chenyu Here + Nyarara Mwanawe
- (2008) Teerera
- (2015) Gidah (Coke Studio South Africa: Season 1)
- (2019) Holidays
- (2022) My Better Half

Compilation:

- (1983) Greatest Hits
- (1989) Tuku Live At Sakubva Concert
- (1990) Psss Psss Hallo!
- (1992) Dzakaita Mukurumbira Na Tuku
- (1996) Mapisarema A Oliver Mutukudzi
- (1998) Dzangu Dziye
- (2002) Greatest Hits: The Tuku Years (1998-2002)
- (2003) The Oliver Mtukudzi Collection (The Tuku Years)
- (2004) Shanda - Special Edition DVD & CD
- (2004) Collection 1984-1991
- (2004) Collection 1991-1997
- (2006) Wonai
- (2006) Oliver Mtukudzi Selected Favourites
- (2010) Kutsi Kwemoyo (compilation)
- (2011) Abi'angu Duets Of My Time
- (2016) God Bless You – The Gospel Collection
- (2017) Essentials

=== Contributing artist ===
1. 1996 The Rough Guide to the Music of Zimbabwe (World Music Network)
2. 1999 Unwired: Acoustic Music from Around the World (World Music Network)
3. 2000 Unwired: Africa (World Music Network)

Sarawoga laments the losses that the legend has had to endure in his life, not least the loss of life. Thus he has been left 'alone' in a sense, hence the title Sarawoga (left alone).

== Filmography ==
- Jit (dir. Michael Raeburn, 1990)
- Neria (dir. Goodwin Mawuru, written by Tsitsi Dangarembga, 1993). Mtukudzi starred in the movie and made the soundtrack.
- Shanda (dir. John and Louise Riber, 2002, rev. 2004)
- Sarawoga, 2009, was written by Elias C. Machemedze, directed by Watson Chidzomba and produced by Oliver Mtukudzi, who also did the soundtrack for the film.
- 2012 Nzou NeMhuru Mudanga DVD, the live recording of a show, a theatrical performance which Tuku had with his son just weeks before his death.
- A new Neria 21 film was premiered by Rawsoot Studios in 2021 and later public release in March 2024 on YouTube. The new release was dedicated to the late musician Oliver Mtukudzi.

== Awards ==
- An honorary degree from the University of Zimbabwe in December 2003
- M-Net Best Soundtrack Award in 1992, for Neria
- Honorary Doctorate of Humane Letters (DHL) from The Institute of Philanthropy in July 2014
- Best Southern African Male Artist and the Lifetime Achievement Award KORA Music Awards 2003
