= Godwin Mawuru =

Zimbabwean film director (1961–2013)

- Born: 15 July 1961; Shamva
- Died: 24 May 2013 (aged 51)
- Citizenship: Zimbabwean
- Occupations: director; producer
- Years active: Early eighties - 2013
- Known for: The Tree Is Mine, Neria

Godwin Mawuru (15 July 1961 – 24 May 2013) was a Zimbabwean director and producer.

== Life and career ==
Born in Shamva, Mawuru started his career on stage in the early eighties, working in various areas including acting, directing and working backstage. He made his debut as director with the 1987 film The Tree Is Mine. He is internationally best known for the 1993 film Neria. As a producer, he is best known for the Zimbabwean first and longest running soap opera Studio 263.

== Death ==
He died as a consequence of a sepsis at 51.
