= Killarney Film Studios =

South African film studio

Killarney Film Studios was a South African film studio established in Johannesburg by New York native and business tycoon Isidore W. Schlesinger in 1915 and is regarded as "the first motion picture studio in Africa". Schlesinger moved to South Africa in 1894, against his family's wishes, when he read about the discovery of gold in Witwatersrand. In 1913, having accumulated wealth throughout various ventures, he ventured in to the entertainment industry in 1913 when he purchased the Empire Theatre in Johannesburg for £60,000 and converted what was an "insolvent" business into a flourishing one named African Consolidated Theatres, which worked on the national distribution of content like variety shows and films from the Cape of Good Hope to the Zambezi River.

== History ==
The studio was founded and funded in the Johannesburg suburb of Killarney by American citizen Isidore W. Schlesinger. Two years earlier, Schlesinger had bought up Australian Rufus Naylor's Africa's Amalgamated Theatres (est. 1911) and Edgar Hyman's Empire Theatres Company (est. 1912) to form the African Theatres and Films Trusts on 10 April 1913. In this way Schlesinger obtained a monopoly over film importation and distribution throughout Southern Africa.

Schlesinger set up African Film Productions (AFP), which on 5 May 1913 screened the first of its weekly newsreels, African Mirror. AFP continued to produce African Mirror, which included features on African countries such as Tanzania, and interviews with notables such as Chris Barnard for South African consumption until 1984. Schlesinger imported Joseph Albrecht from Britain to run the African Mirror.

In 1915 the Killarney Film Studios produced South Africa's first animated film, Artist's Dream. Directed by Harold Shaw, the artist in the film was portrayed by Dennis Santry. Schlesinger's wife, Mabel May, starred as the artist's dream girl. Whether this production was inspired by Thomas Edison's 1900 film of the same title is unclear, as no copies remain of the South African version. Five more animated short films followed, and film titles were also often animated.

African Film Productions made 43 films between 1916 and 1922. The scarcity of international films during the First World War boosted the development of Schlesinger's company. As befits the political context of a newly unified state (the Union of South Africa, 1910) the earlier films aimed at the white market featured co-operation between Boer and Briton as a common theme. Once apartheid started in earnest after 1948, some films took up the theme of whites standing together against black Africans. Apart from feature films, AFP produced "documentaries" for the state, as well as industrial safety films. During the 1920s to 1940s the distribution of AFP films to the black African market was aided by missionaries such as Reverend Ray Phillips, who from about 1920 wanted to use the medium to impart (Western) morals to black Africans. Phillips showed films to mine workers (most notably, during the 1922 white miners' strike), as well as to the middle class black elite who attended his Bantu Men's Social Centre (established by Phillips in Johannesburg). Most of these films came from Killarney Film Studios.

AFP produced "the first sound advertisement films in South Africa for Joko Tea and Pegasus products" in 1930. The first films to stimulate internal tourism were produced by AFP in serial magazine form, entitled Our Land.

In the 1940s a special effects department was set up at Killarney. Reflecting the rise of Afrikaner nationalism, African Film Productions produced a plethora of popular light-hearted Afrikaans fare, such as Kom Saam Vanaand (Afrikaans, Come Along Tonight). The first South African and Afrikaans musical, this film was produced by Pierre de Wet in 1949.

The studio also printed copies of international films, such as J. Arthur Rank's The Sea Shall Not Have Them (1954).

20th Century Fox bought AFP in 1959 but as a result of the world decline of the movie Cleopatra which cost the film industry around the world very dearly, the Schlesinger family took back AFP due to non-payment. In 1967 Fox produced two films in South Africa directed by Robert D. Webb with cinematography by David Millin that were remakes of Fox films. Yellow Sky was remade as The Jackals with Vincent Price and the then up and coming Robert Gunner and Pickup on South Street was remade as The Cape Town Affair with Claire Trevor and the up-and-coming James Brolin and Jacqueline Bisset. In 1968 the company made Majuba about the First Boer War.

In the 1970s the Sanlam Corporation bought AFP from the Schlesingers and later it was resold, the name was changed to South African Screen Productions and the studio was moved to Balfour Park.

Killarney Film Studios' original buildings were demolished in 1972 by John Schlesinger (Isidore's son), who built Johannesburg's first mall, Killarney Mall.

== Notable staff ==
- General manager(s): Hyman Kirstein, Benny Mechanik (1972)
- Directors: Pierre de Wet (1940s-70s)
- Cameras: Joseph Albrecht, African Mirror; Italo Bernicchi, African Mirror, during the 1950s; Vincent Cox (ASC); David Millin, African Mirror (ASC)
- Film editors: Barney Bernard Joffe (chief editor), Tommy Doig (assistant editor) Peter Grossett, Bill Asher Features Editors
- Art director: Gordon Vorster (1950–63)
- Makeup: William "Bill" Bell

== Films ==
- 1915: The Artist's Dream: first South African animated film
- 1916: De Voortrekkers
- 1930: In the Land of the Zulus, "the first sound film of Black traditional life".
- 1949: Kom saam, vanaand [Afrikaans, Come Along Tonight), the first South African and Afrikaans musical.
- 1968: Majuba directed by David Millin about the Battle of Majuba Hill
- 1974: Gold, starring Roger Moore and Susannah York, nominated in 1975 for an Academy Award for (Best Music, Original Song) and a BAFTA for Best Sound Track.

== Painting ==
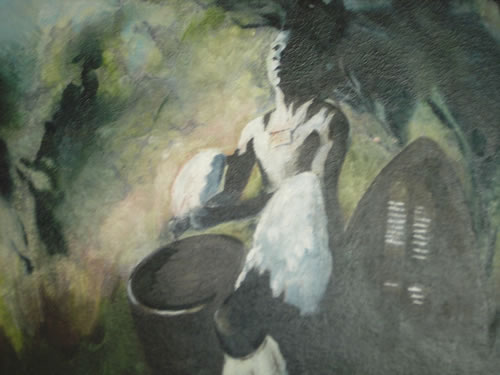
Painting of Zulu with drums used originally for media purposes in the days of the existence of the African Mirror film reels and Killarney Film Studios

Items of historical value during the existence of the Killarney Film Studio's and the African Mirror: A painting done by artist Rob Evans, portraying a Zulu playing on an African drum, whilst holding a shield in one hand. It is understood that the drum portrayed in the painting is the original African drum which was used at the beginning of the African Mirror film reels. This painting was commissioned to be used for publicity purposes within the media during the last years of the African Mirror. This painting, if still in existence, is considered an item of historical value.
