= Yellow Sky =

1948 film by William A. Wellman

- Directed by: William A. Wellman
- Screenplay by: Lamar Trotti
- Based on: Yellow Sky (unpublished novel) by W. R. Burnett
- Produced by: Lamar Trotti
- Starring: Gregory Peck; Richard Widmark; Anne Baxter
- Cinematography: Joseph MacDonald
- Edited by: Harmon Jones
- Music by: Alfred Newman
- Distributed by: 20th Century Fox
- Release date: December 24, 1948
- Running time: 98 minutes
- Country: United States
- Language: English
- Box office: $2.8 million

Yellow Sky is a 1948 American Western film directed by William A. Wellman and starring Gregory Peck, Richard Widmark, and Anne Baxter. Based on an unpublished novel by W. R. Burnett, believed to be loosely adapted from William Shakespeare's The Tempest, the plot concerns a band of reprobate outlaws who flee after a bank robbery and encounter an old man and his granddaughter in a ghost town.

== Plot ==
In 1867, a gang led by James "Stretch" Dawson (Gregory Peck) robs a bank and, chased by soldiers, choose to cross the salt flats of Death Valley. After an arduous journey, collapsing from heat and dehydration, the outlaws come upon a ghost town called Yellow Sky and its only residents, a tough young woman called Mike (Anne Baxter) and her gold prospector grandfather (James Barton). Stretch is attracted to Mike. While the men recover from their ordeal at a spring, gambler Dude (Richard Widmark) snoops around. Dude tells the others that the old man is mining gold, but Stretch is unimpressed. The next day, Mike and Grandpa take to the hills. A confrontation between Stretch and Dude over the leadership of the gang is interrupted by Mike shooting at them. However, when Grandpa is hit in the leg by a ricochet, Mike surrenders.

Back in the house, Grandpa is persuaded into a deal to split his gold, worth roughly $50,000 by his estimate. At the spring, Lengthy (John Russell) grabs Mike, forcing himself on her. the young Bull Run (Robert Arthur) intervenes to protect her and Lengthy holds him underwater. Stretch rescues him and holds Lengthy's head underwater until he nearly drowns. That night, Stretch approaches Mike again, this time cleaned up to make a better impression on her. He assures her and Grandpa that he will keep to the bargain, swearing on a bible, with Dude eavesdropping.

The next day, a large band of Apaches appear while the gang is at the mine digging up the gold. Grandpa tells Stretch that he convinced his Apache friends to return to the reservation and that he told them nothing about the gang. In gratitude for the old man not sending the Indians to wipe out his gang, Stretch tells his men that they will share the gold, but Dude has convinced them to join him against Stretch and take all of the gold. Dude draws his gun and fires on Stretch. A shootout amongst the rocks ensues with the gang against Stretch. Mike shows up and helps a wounded Stretch back to her home. Not wanting to spend the rest of their lives looking over their shoulders for Stretch, the gang surrounds the house.

In the ensuing gunfight they think that Stretch has been killed. Dude wants all the gold for himself and shoots at Lengthy, but misses. Bull Run is also shot and fatally wounded by Dude and so Walrus (Charles Kemper) and Half Pint (Harry Morgan) decide to help Stretch. Stretch goes after Dude and Lengthy, who have gone into the town to escape. A deadly three-sided shootout in the saloon follows. A frantic Mike finds Dude and Lengthy dead inside and Stretch unconscious but still breathing. After Stretch recovers, he, Walrus and Half Pint, who is now wearing Dude's clothes, return to the bank they robbed and give back the stolen money. Then, they ride off with Mike and Grandpa.

== Cast ==
- Gregory Peck as James "Stretch" Dawson
- Anne Baxter as "Mike" (Constance Mae)
- Richard Widmark as Dude
- Robert Arthur as Bull Run
- John Russell as Lengthy
- Harry Morgan as Half Pint
- James Barton as Grandpa
- Charles Kemper as Walrus

== Production ==
The studio purchased W. R. Burnett's unpublished novel for $35,000 in November 1947. All drafts of the screenplay were written by Lamar Trotti.

In a memo, studio head Darryl F. Zanuck suggested Walter Huston for the role of Grandpa and Fred Clark for Lengthy. Paulette Goddard was originally cast as Mike.

Exteriors were also filmed at Death Valley National Monument, with the cast and crew living at Furnace Creek Inn and Camp, which was leased from the Pacific Coast Borax Company. The western commenced a construction crew of over 150 men and women to build a ghost town in the desert near Lone Pine, California, by demolishing a movie set, called "Last Outpost", that Tom Mix had built in 1923. At the request of the Society for the Prevention of Cruelty to Animals, the horses worked only three hours a day in the intense heat.

The opening and closing music was taken from Alfred Newman's score for the Twentieth Century-Fox film Brigham Young (1940), which was also written by Trotti.

== Reception ==
Reviews praised the cinematography, direction, and screenplay. Christoper Tookey says "...a superior Western...Wellman's atmospheric direction (making effective use of natural sound) and Joseph MacDonald's stark cinematography make it something special. Lamar Trotti's screenplay is one that could be usefully studied by aspiring screenwriters; it makes minimal use of dialogue, yet won an award from America's Writers Guild." Bosley Crowther wrote, "Guns blaze, fists fly and passions tangle in the best realistic Western style. William A. Wellman has directed for steel-spring tension from the beginning to the end." The story is kept "on the surface level of action and partly contrived romance. At this popular level they have made it tough, taut and good...it's classy and exciting while it lasts"

TV Guide writes, "The unlikely ending doesn't injure this brilliantly filmed and directed Western, which qualifies as one of the best of the genre. The high-contrast black-and-white photography is stunning...Dialogue is all the more telling for being sparse, the story is carried visually. The music is fine, beginning the action of each scene, then fading as stark realism takes hold and natural sounds are heard."

== Adaptations and remakes ==
Burnett published his novel in 1950 as Stretch Dawson.

The success of the film spawned a radio adaptation starring Peck and hosted by director William A. Wellman, which was broadcast on Screen Directors Playhouse on NBC Radio on July 15, 1949. The film was remade in 1967 as The Jackals. Filmed in South Africa at Killarney Film Studios by producer-director Robert D. Webb, The Jackals starred Robert Gunner, Diana Iverson and, as the old man, the 56 year old Vincent Price.
