= Majuba: Heuwel van Duiwe =

1968 South African war drama film

- Directed by: David Millin
- Written by: David Millin
- Based on: Novel by Stuart Cloete
- Produced by: Roscoe C. Behrmann; Hyman Kirstein
- Starring: Roland Robinson; Reinet Maasdorp; Patrick Mynhardt; Siegfried Mynhardt
- Cinematography: John Brown; Dudley Paterson
- Edited by: Alastair Henderson
- Music by: Bob Adams; Joe Kentridge
- Release date: 23 December 1968 (South Africa)
- Running time: 113 min.
- Country: South Africa
- Languages: Afrikaans; English

Majuba: Heuwel van Duiwe (Majuba: Hill of Doves), is a 1968 South African War drama film directed by David Millin and co-produced by Roscoe C. Behrmann and Hyman Kirstein. The film stars Roland Robinson, Reinet Maasdorp, and Patrick Mynhardt in lead roles along with Siegfried Mynhardt, Anna Neethling-Pohl and Morné Coetzer in supportive roles.

The film was inspired by real events of the First Boer War which included the Battle of Bronkhorstspruit, the Battle of Laing's Nek and the Battle of Majuba Hill. The film received positive reviews and won several awards at international film festivals.

The film's original cinema release version ran to almost three hours yet its local distributors cut the film down to have more daily screenings as it was immensely popular: the shortened version is all that remains of the original cut and the excised footage was never archived.

== Synopsis ==
Set during the first Anglo-Boer War 1880-1881 details the events leading up to this final battle ending in one of the most humiliating defeats for Britain in history.

== Cast ==
- Roland Robinson as Dirk van der Berg
- Reinet Maasdorp as Lena du Toit
- Patrick Mynhardt as Rolf du Toit
- Siegfried Mynhardt as Philippus du Toit
- Anna Neethling-Pohl as Katryn du Toit
- Morné Coetzer as Louis du Toit
- James White as Boetie van der Berg
- Tromp Terre'blanche as Groot Dirk van der Berg
- Virgo du Plessis as Tanta Johanna van der Berg
- Thandi Brewer as Klein Johanna
- Francis Coertze as Tanta Martha
- Petrina Fry as Mrs. Brenner
- Eric Cordell as Mr. Brenner
- Kerry Jordan as Col. Philip Anstruther
- Pieter Hauptfleisch as Commandant Frans Joubert
- June Neethling as Stephanie
- Morrison Gampu as Reuter
- Hugh Rouse as Lieutenant - Doornkloof
- Anthony James as Maj. Gen. Sir George Pomeroy Colley
- Ian Yule as Deserter
- George Jackson as Deserter Thomas
- Peter Tobin as Col. Stewart
- Willie van Rensburg as Commandant Smit
- Lance Lockhart-Ross as Maj. Fraser
- Lourens Schultz as Commandant General Piet Joubert
- Esmé Euvrard as Spotter
- Adrian Steed as Melton Prior, war correspondent
- Elizabeth Hamilton as Edith Colley
- Kenneth Baker as Capt. Lang
- Brian Brooke as Captain - Brennersdorp
- Johan du Plooy as Hans
- Jaco van der Westhuizen as Willem
