= All the Way to Paris =

- Directed by: Jamie Uys
- Written by: Jamie Uys
- Produced by: Jamie Uys
- Starring: Jamie Uys; Bob Courtney; Reinet Maasdorf; Angus Neill
- Cinematography: Manie Botha
- Edited by: Dave Burman
- Music by: Sam Sklair
- Release date: 5 May 1966
- Country: South Africa
- Languages: English; Afrikaans

All the Way to Paris is a 1966 South African comedy film directed by Jamie Uys and starring Uys, Bob Courtney and Reinet Maasdorp.

It was the first South African film to be filmed overseas.

== Premise ==
International diplomats take part in a walking competition, heading towards a major conference in Paris.

== Cast ==
- Jamie Uys – Igor Strogoff
- Bob Courtney – Granger J. Wellborne
- Reinet Maasdorp – Tanya Orloff
- Angus Neill – Johnny Edwards
- Joe Stewardson – Ed Sloane
- Arthur Swemmer – Anzonia
- Frank Gregory – Italian Mayor
- Mimmo Poli – Italian Butcher
- Marjorie Gordon – Matron
- Emil Nofal – TV Announcer
- Sann De Lange – Yugoslav Mother
- Wilhelm Esterhuizen – Austrian Farmer
- Victor Ivanoff – Chief of the Russian Delegation
- Keith Stanners-Bloxam – Chief of the American Delegation
- Ricky Arden – Russian Delegate
