= David Millin =

South African film director (1920–1999)

- Born: 11 June 1920
- Died: 26 May 1999 (aged 78)
- Citizenship: South African
- Occupations: Film director cinematographer film producer.
- Notable work: Shangani Patrol

David Millin (11 June 1920 - 26 May 1999) was a South African film director, cinematographer and film producer. He has produced various Afrikaans and English films throughout his career. He has been a member of the American Society of Cinematographers since 1972, the first member from South Africa belonging to the organization. In 1994 he was honored by M-Net for his lifetime contribution to the industry and in 1997 he was also honored by SASC / Kodak for his contribution. He was famous for his spectacular depictions, large (but precise) war scenes and his dry sense of humor.

== Filmography ==
As director:

- Suster Teresa, 1974
- Die Voortrekkers, 1973
- Met Moed, Durf en Bloed, 1973
- Die Banneling, 1971
- Shangani Patrol, 1970
- Banana Beach, 1970
- Petticoat Safari, 1969
- Majuba: Heuwel van Duiwe, 1968
- The Second Sin, 1966
- African Gold, 1965
- Seven Against the Sun, 1964
- Stropers van die Laeveld, 1962
- Donker Afrika, 1957
- Last of the Few (year unknown)

As a cinematographer:

- Killer Force, 1976
- Die Banneling, 1971
- The Jackals, 1967
- The Cape Town Affair, 1967
- Diamond Safari, 1958
- Donker Afrika, 1957
- 'n Plan is 'n Boerdery, 1954
- Inspan, 1953
- Hans-die-Skipper, 1952
- Last of the Few

As manufacturer:

- Die Voortrekkers, 1973
- Met Moed, Durf en Bloed, 1973
- Shangani Patrol, 1970
- Banana Beach, 1970
- Seven Against the Sun, 1964
- Last of the Few

As scriptwriter:

- Met Moed, Durf en Bloed, 1973
- African Gold, 1965
- Seven Against the Sun, 1964
- Last of the Few
