= Siegfried Mynhardt =

South African actor (1906–1996)

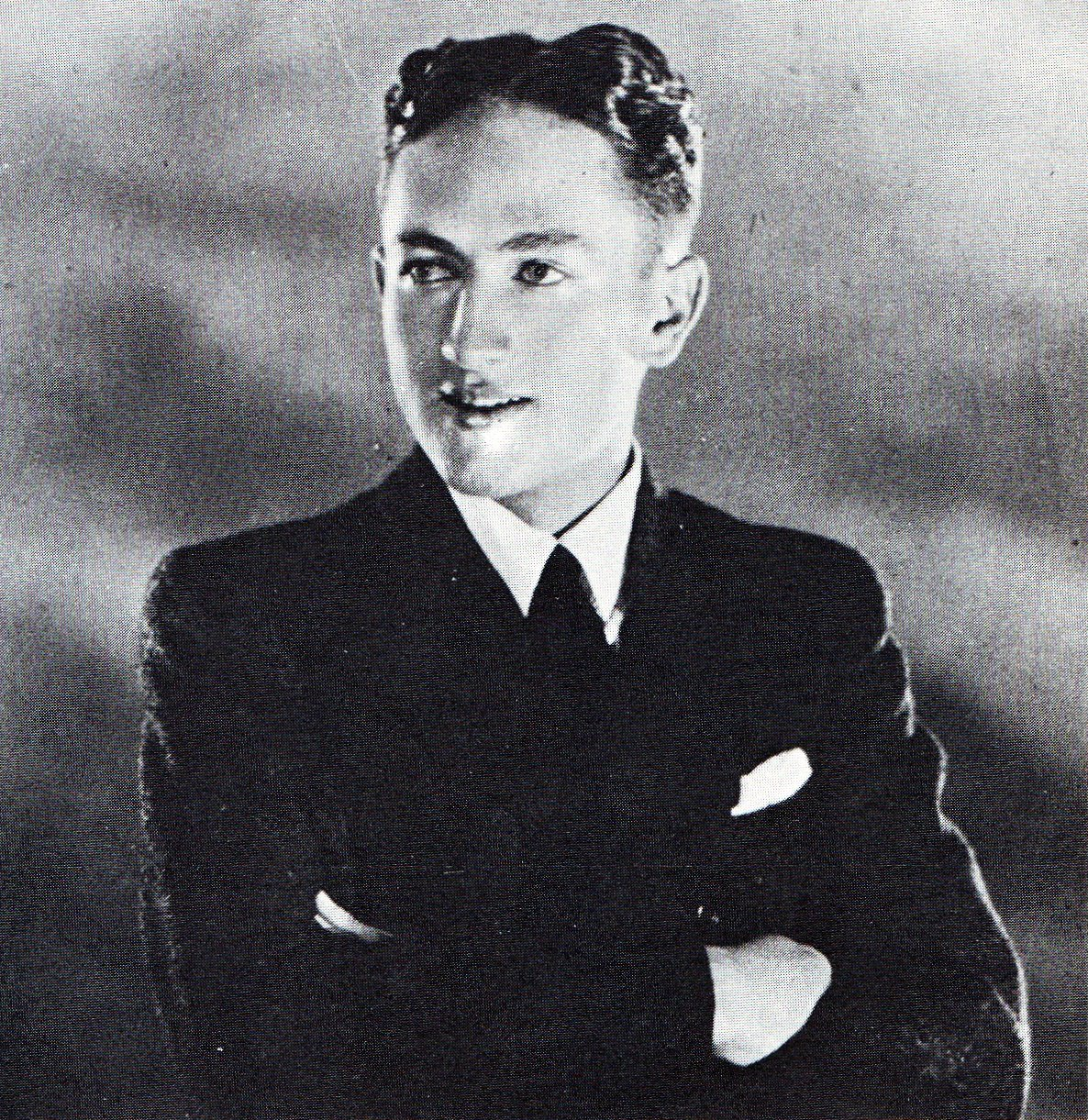
- Mynhardt in 1930
- Born: Siegfried Charles Ferdinand Mynhardt; 5 March 1909; Johannesburg, Transvaal Colony
- Died: 28 March 1996 (aged 87); Johannesburg, South Africa
- Years active: 1956–1990
- Spouse: Jocelyn Mynhardt
- Children: 3

Siegfried Mynhardt (5 March 1906 – 28 March 1996) was a South African actor.

== Personal life ==
Mynhardt was born in Johannesburg and lived in a Wynberg army camp, where his father was a padre. He had three children with his wife, Jocelyn.

== Career ==
As well as appearing in several films and several television projects, Mynhardt was also known for his work in both South African and British theatre. After the end of school, he started appearing in theatre productions across South Africa. He admitted that he learnt true professionalism in the 1930s, when he was performing in the Old Vic in London and sharing a flat with Alec Guinness. His credits included appearing in Dingaka, a 1965 film by the acclaimed South African director, Jamie Uys. He later appeared alongside Jacqueline Bisset in A Cape Town Affair. On 26 January 2020, Siegfried was also inaugurated as a living legend in the South African Legends Museum. His nephew, Shaun Mynhardt dedicated the museum in memory of Siegie.

== Selected filmography ==
Film & Television
Year	Film	Role	Notes
1965	Dingaka	Judge	Jamie Uys film
1967	The Cape Town Affair	Fenton	Robert D. Webb film
1968	Majuba: Heuwel van Duiwe	Philippus Du Toit	David Millin film
1968	Doctor Kalie	Doctor Kalie	Ivan Hall film
1968	Jy is my liefling	Du Toit	Dirk DeVilliers
1969	Danie Bosman: Die verhaal van die Grootste Komponis		Tommie Meyer film
1974	Tant Ralie se losieshuis	Matroos CJ	Ivan Hall film
1975	Die troudag van tant Ralie	Matroos CJ	Ivan Hall film
1977	Funeral for an Assassin	Judge William Whitfield	Ivan Hall film
1986	Auf Achse	–	German television series, episode "Konvo"
