= The Proud Ones =

1956 film by Robert D. Webb

- Film poster
- Directed by: Robert D. Webb
- Screenplay by: Edmund H. North; Joseph Petracca
- Based on: The Proud Ones; 1952 novel by Verne Athanas
- Produced by: Robert L. Jacks
- Starring: Robert Ryan; Virginia Mayo; Jeffrey Hunter
- Cinematography: Lucien Ballard
- Edited by: Hugh S. Fowler
- Music by: Lionel Newman
- Color process: Color by DeLuxe
- Production company: 20th Century Fox
- Distributed by: 20th Century Fox
- Release date: May 1956
- Running time: 94 minutes
- Country: United States
- Language: English
- Budget: $1.4 million

The Proud Ones is a 1956 American CinemaScope Western film directed by Robert D. Webb and starring Robert Ryan and Virginia Mayo. The film was based on the 1952 novel by Verne Athanas who after suffering an early heart attack, gave up logging and started writing under the pseudonym Bill Colson.

== Plot ==
Cass Silver, marshal of a small Kansas town, is expecting trouble with the arrival of the first Texas trail herds to meet the newly completed railroad. The town's new saloon owner, Honest John Barrett is anticipating an increase in business.

He and Silver have a negative history between them and Barrett wants rid of the marshal. To make matters worse, the marshal's deputy, Thad Anderson, formerly one of the trail cowboys, is the son of a gunfighter Cass shot years before. Thad wants to avenge this death; he has always believed his father was unarmed when Silver shot him. Eventually, Thad realizes the truth and helps the marshal restore law and order to the town.

== Cast ==
- Robert Ryan as Marshal Cass Silver
- Virginia Mayo as Sally
- Jeffrey Hunter as Thad Anderson
- Robert Middleton as Honest John Barrett
- Walter Brennan as Jake
- Arthur O'Connell as Jim Dexter
- Fay Roope as Markham
- Ken Clark as Pike
- Rodolfo Acosta as Chico
- George Mathews as Dillon
- Edward Platt as Dr. Barlow
- Whit Bissell as Mr. Sam Bolton
- Frank Gerstle as Tim
- Paul E. Burns as Billy Smith
- Edward Mundy as Saloon Barker
- I. Stanford Jolley as Crooked Card Player
- William Fawcett as Driver
- Richard Deacon as Barber
- Jackie Coogan as Man on the Make
- Harry Carter as Houseman
- Don Brodie as Hotel Clerk
- Steve Darrell as George, trail boss

== Production ==
Film rights were purchased by 20th Century Fox in November 1952 who assigned Frank Rosenberg to produce. Victor Mature, Robert Wagner and Debra Paget were originally announced as stars.

The film was not made for a number of years however. In December 1955 Fox said the leads would be played by Robert Ryan, and Virginia Mayo and it would be produced by Robert Jacks with filming to start December 28. Joseph Petracca did a rewrite of the script. Guy Madison was meant to co-star. He dropped out and was replaced by Robert Stack. In early January Stack was replaced by Jeffrey Hunter.

== Music ==
The "Theme from the Proud Ones" written by Lionel Newman, recorded by Nelson Riddle, reached number 39 on the US charts on August 4, 1956.

== See also ==
- List of American films of 1956
