= High Sierra (film) =

1941 film by Raoul Walsh

- Theatrical release poster
- Directed by: Raoul Walsh
- Screenplay by: John Huston; W. R. Burnett
- Based on: High Sierra; 1940 novel by W. R. Burnett
- Produced by: Mark Hellinger
- Starring: Ida Lupino; Humphrey Bogart; Alan Curtis; Arthur Kennedy; Joan Leslie; Henry Hull; Henry Travers
- Cinematography: Tony Gaudio
- Edited by: Jack Killifer
- Music by: Adolph Deutsch
- Production company: Warner Bros. Pictures
- Distributed by: Warner Bros. Pictures
- Release date: January 23, 1941 (Los Angeles)
- Running time: 100 minutes
- Country: United States
- Language: English
- Budget: $491,000
- Box office: $1.5 million

High Sierra is a 1941 American film noir directed by Raoul Walsh, written by William R. Burnett and John Huston from the novel by Burnett, and starring Ida Lupino and Humphrey Bogart. Its plot follows career criminal Roy Earle who becomes involved in a jewel heist in a resort town in California's Sierra Nevada, along with young former taxi dancer Marie Garson (Lupino).

Parts of the film were shot on location at Whitney Portal, halfway up Mount Whitney. The screenplay was co-written by John Huston, Bogart's friend and drinking partner, adapted from the novel by William R. Burnett (also known for, among others, the novel that was adapted into the film Little Caesar and the script for Scarface). The film cemented a strong personal and professional connection between Bogart and Huston, and provided the breakthrough in Bogart's career, transforming him from supporting player to leading man. The film's success also led to a breakthrough for Huston, providing him with the leverage he needed to make the transition from screenwriter to director, which he made later that year with his adaptation of The Maltese Falcon (1941), starring Bogart.

The film contains extensive location shooting, especially in the climactic final scenes, as the authorities pursue Bogart's character, gangster Roy Earle, from Lone Pine to the foot of the mountains. The novel is also the basis of the western Colorado Territory (also directed by Walsh, starring Joel McCrea & Virginia Mayo) and the scene-by-scene remake I Died a Thousand Times (directed by Stuart Heisler with Jack Palance as Roy and Shelley Winters as Marie).

== Plot summary ==
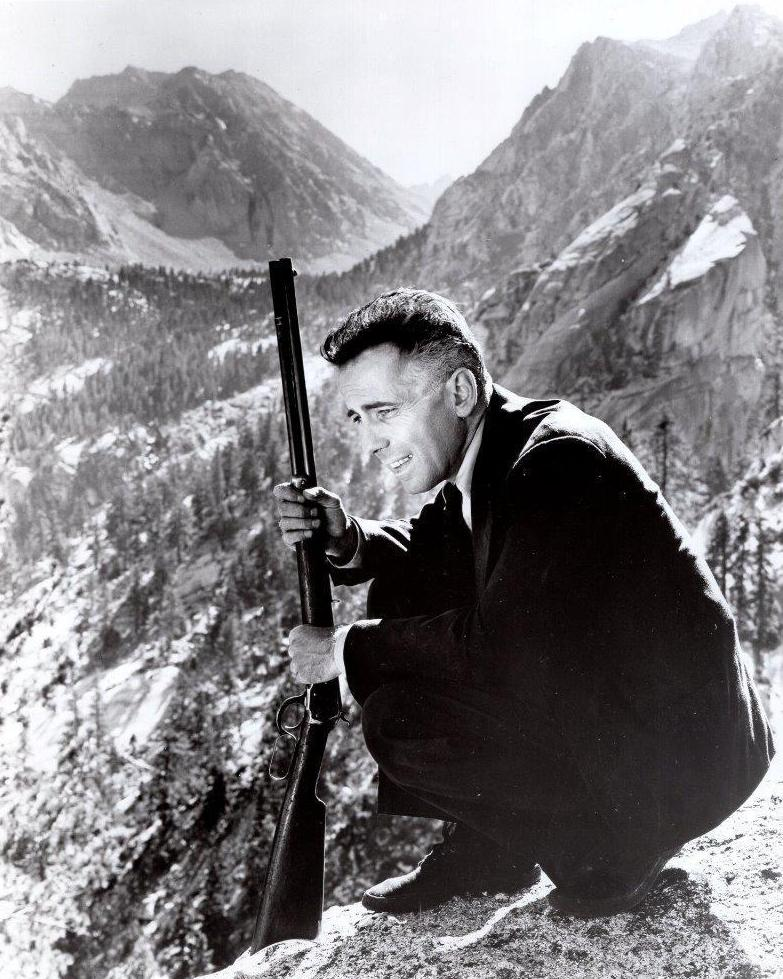
Humphrey Bogart in High Sierra

An aging gangster, Big Mac M'Gann, is planning a robbery at a fashionable resort hotel in the resort town of Tropico Springs in the Sierra Nevada. He wants the heist led by convicted bank robber Roy Earle, whose recent release from an Indiana prison was engineered by Big Mac's bribing the governor. Roy drives cross-country to an abandoned logging camp in the mountains to meet with the three men who will assist him in the heist: Louis Mendoza works as a clerk in the hotel, while Red Hattery and Babe Kozak are living at the camp. Babe has brought along his girlfriend Marie Garson, a "dime-a-dance girl" from Los Angeles.

Deriding Marie's involvement, Roy at first insists she return to Los Angeles, but after some discussion he agrees to let her stay. At the camp, Algernon, a handyman, introduces Roy to Pard, a small dog to whom he takes a liking, and Roy decides to adopt the dog. Meanwhile, Marie falls in love with Roy, but he does not share her feelings. In Tropico Springs, Roy witnesses a minor car accident involving Ma and Pa Goodhue and their granddaughter Velma, a young woman with a clubfoot who walks with a limp. Swiftly enamored with Velma, Roy pays for corrective surgery to allow her to walk normally, despite her grandfather's warning that Velma is engaged. While she is recovering, Roy asks Velma to marry him, but she refuses, explaining that she is devoted to her fiancé back east.

The group execute the heist at the hotel, but it goes awry when they are interrupted by a security guard. Roy makes his getaway with Marie and a stash of jewelry from the hotel safe, but Mendoza, Red, and Babe are involved in a car accident in which Red and Babe die. Mendoza is captured by the police who question him. Roy and Marie drive to Los Angeles with the jewels, only to find that Big Mac has died of a heart attack and that Jake Kranmer, an ex-policeman, has taken over the operation. Kranmer tries to force Roy to give him the jewels, but a defiant Roy shoots him dead.

Back in Los Angeles, Roy visits Velma, having promised her he would come to see her when she is able to walk. He then meets with Art, a fence who is to pay for the stolen jewels, but Art tells Roy he cannot pay him the $30,000 immediately. While Art holds onto the jewels, Roy gives Marie an engagement ring. He and Marie go into hiding at a hotel, but they panic when Roy's name and face make newspaper headlines, and the stories mention both Marie and even Pard, based on what Mendoza has told the police.

Deciding that he would be safer on his own, Roy sends Marie and Pard to Las Vegas by bus. He returns to Los Angeles to get paid for the jewelry. Figuring on collecting immediately, he has given all his ready cash to Marie. When his car runs low on gas, Roy risks a small town stickup and is immediately recognized. Roy is pursued by police back into the mountains, where he is forced to abandon his car and flee on foot. Marie hears a news broadcast about the chase. She is then interrogated by investigators, who try to persuade her to lure Roy out of hiding. She refuses, knowing that Roy would rather die than return to prison. The police force her to accompany them on their search in the mountains. Meanwhile, Roy hides out behind a large rock on the mountainside.

At dawn, Pard escapes the police encampment and locates Roy, who is suddenly distracted by the dog's barking. Assuming Marie has found him, Roy runs out onto a precipice, calling her name, and is killed by a sharpshooter. Marie watches in horror from below as Roy's body topples down the mountainside. Followed by officers, Marie rushes to Roy's body, as does Pard, who lies down next to him. As Marie is escorted away with Pard, she takes small comfort in knowing that Roy will not be returning to prison.

== Cast ==
- Ida Lupino as Marie Garson
- Humphrey Bogart as Roy Earle/Roy Collins
- Alan Curtis as Babe Kozak
- Arthur Kennedy as Red Hattery
- Joan Leslie as Velma Goodhue
- Henry Hull as "Doc" Banton
- Henry Travers as Pa Goodhue
- Jerome Cowan as Vince Healy
- Minna Gombell as Mrs. Baughman
- Barton MacLane as Jake Kranmer
- Elizabeth Risdon as Ma Goodhue
- Cornel Wilde as Louis Mendoza
- Donald MacBride as Big Mac M'Gann
- Paul Harvey as Mr. Baughman
- Isabel Jewell as Blonde
- Willie Best as Algernon
- Spencer Charters as Ed
- George Meeker as Pfiffer
- Robert Strange as Art
- John Eldredge as Lon Preiser
- Eddie Acuff as Bus Driver (uncredited)

== Themes ==
Luke Goodsell, writing for Senses of Cinema, writes that High Sierra presents its heist narrative as "something of a grasp for the fabled new America. Here, the Old West has been replaced by health spas and diets and a clean-living California; not coincidentally, a land that flourished in tandem with the aspirational illusion of Hollywood."

== Production ==
George Raft was intended to play Roy Earle, but Humphrey Bogart, who took a great interest in playing the role, managed to talk Raft out of accepting it. Raoul Walsh tried to persuade Raft otherwise but Raft did not want his character to die at the end of the film. FilmInk said Raft "turned down High Sierra because it was another gangster part, despite the excellent source material and Raoul Walsh directing (admittedly Paul Muni rejected the role first for the same reason… but Muni was a proper actor, well established in a variety of parts and Raft wasn’t)."

Bogart had to persuade director Walsh to hire him for the role, because Walsh envisioned Bogart as a supporting player rather than a leading man, although writer John Huston saw potential in Bogart that others in the studio did not perceive. Ida Lupino had received good publicity in connection with her performance in They Drive by Night, and this caused producer Mark Hellinger to suggest to executive producer Hal Wallis that Lupino be billed over Bogart, who to that point had only starred in "B" movies; in later releases of the film, Bogart got top billing. Bogart's portrayal of Roy Earle in High Sierra made him a star, and changed the way Warner Bros. saw him.

Pard, the dog of Bogart's character Roy, was portrayed by Zero. Zero was erroneously believed by some to be canine actor Terry (Toto from The Wizard of Oz) and also erroneously rumored to be Bogart's own dog. Newspapers of the period, though, indicate that Zero was owned by Rennie Renfro, who was one of the most significant supplier of dog actors in Hollywood at the time. In the final scene, Buster Wiles, a stunt performer, plays Roy's corpse. His hand is filled with biscuits to encourage Pard to lick Roy's hand.

Many key shots of the movie were filmed on location in the Sierra Nevada, including Big Bear Lake and Lake Arrowhead in California. In a climactic scene, Bogart's character slid 90 feet (27 m) down a mountainside to his just reward. His stunt double, Wiles, bounced a few times going down the mountain and wanted another take to do better. "Forget it," said Raoul Walsh. "It's good enough for the 25-cent customers." Special effects were by Byron Haskin and H. F. Koenekamp.

== Release ==
=== Box office ===
High Sierra opened theatrically in Los Angeles on January 23, 1941. According to Warner Bros. records, the film made $1,063,000 in the U.S. ($23.3 million in 2025 terms) and $426,000 ($9.3 million in 2025 terms) in other markets.

=== Critical response ===
The New York Times critic Bosley Crowther liked the acting in the picture, and wrote "As gangster pictures go, this one has everything—speed, excitement, suspense, and that ennobling suggestion of futility, which makes for irony and pity. Mr. Bogart plays the leading role with a perfection of hard-boiled vitality, and Ida Lupino, Arthur Kennedy, Alan Curtis, and a newcomer named Joan Leslie handle lesser roles effectively. Especially, is Miss Lupino impressive as the adoring moll. As gangster pictures go—if they do—it's a perfect epilogue. Count on the old guard and Warners: they die but never surrender."

Time reviewed the film when released as having "less of realistic savagery than of the quaint, nostalgic atmosphere of costume drama." The reviewer noted, "What makes High Sierra something more than a Grade B melodrama is its sensitive delineation of gangster Earle's character. Superbly played by Actor Bogart, Earle is a complex human being, a farmer boy who turned mobster, a gunman with a string of murders on his record who still is shocked when newsmen call him "Mad-Dog" Earle. He is kind to the mongrel dog (Zero) that travels with him, befriends a taxi dancer (Ida Lupino) who becomes his moll, and goes out of his way to help a crippled girl (Joan Leslie). All Roy Earle wants is freedom. He finds it for good on a lonely peak in the mountains."

Rotten Tomatoes gives the film a critic score of 91%, based on 22 reviews.

=== Home media ===
Warner Home Video released High Sierra on DVD in November 2003. On October 12, 2021, The Criterion Collection released a new edition of the film on Blu-ray and DVD.

== Adaptations ==
- A radio play on two broadcasts of The Screen Guild Theater, first on January 4, 1942, with Humphrey Bogart and Claire Trevor, and the second on April 17, 1944, with Bogart and Ida Lupino
- The Western Colorado Territory (1949), starring Joel McCrea and Virginia Mayo, and also directed by Raoul Walsh, was also based on W. R. Burnett's novel.
- I Died a Thousand Times (1955), starring Jack Palance and Shelley Winters, directed by Stuart Heisler was based on Burnett's novel as well.

== See also ==
- Joshua Tree
