= W. R. Burnett =

American novelist and screenwriter (1899–1982)

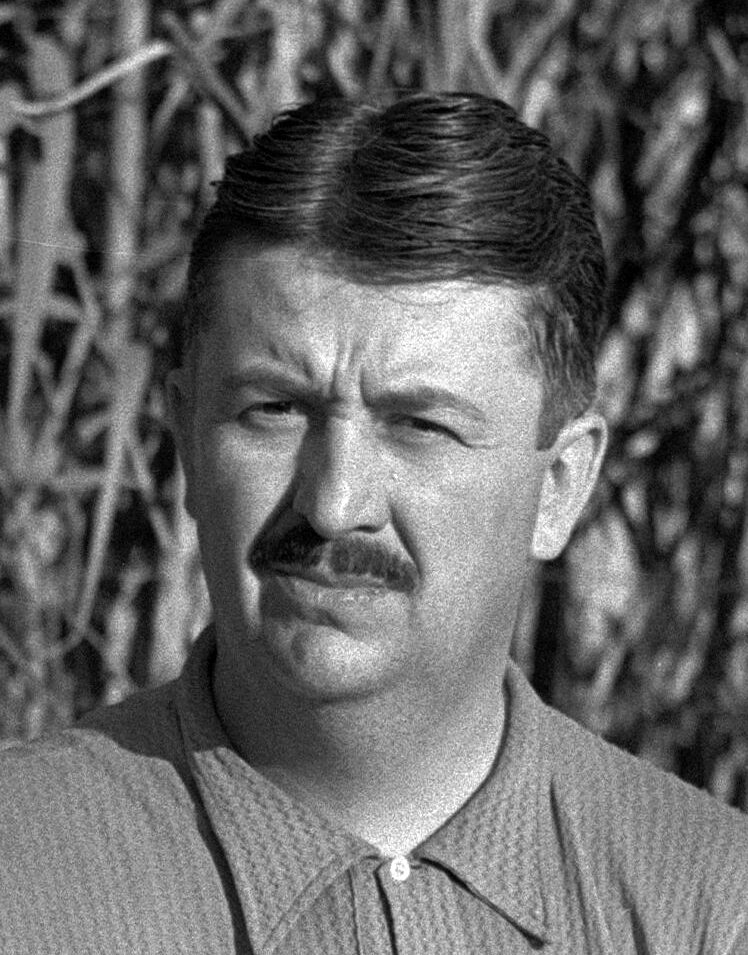
- Burnett in 1935
- Born: William Riley Burnett; November 25, 1899; Springfield, Ohio, U.S.
- Died: April 25, 1982 (aged 82); Santa Monica, California, U.S.
- Resting place: Forest Lawn Memorial Park (Glendale)
- Spouse(s): Marjorie Louise Barstow (m. 1920) Whitney Forbes Johnston (m. 1943)
- Children: 2
- Writing career
- Pen name: Lincoln MacVeagh; John Monahan; James Updyke
- Years active: 1931–1972
- Genres: Crime; Mystery; Thriller; Western
- Notable work: Little Caesar; High Sierra; The Asphalt Jungle; Wake Island; The Great Escape

William Riley Burnett (November 25, 1899 – April 25, 1982) was an American crime novelist and screenwriter.

His debut novel Little Caesar (1929) was adapted into the 1931 film of the same name, which is considered the first of the classic American gangster movies. Several of his other novels and short stories were also adapted to screen, notably High Sierra and The Asphalt Jungle.

As a screenwriter, Burnett was nominated for an Academy Award for Best Original Screenplay for his work on Wake Island (1942). His other notable film credits included Scarface (1932), This Gun for Hire (1942), Vendetta (1950), and The Great Escape (1963).

== Early life ==
Burnett was born in Springfield, Ohio, and attended Miami Military Institute in Germantown, Ohio. He left his civil service job in Springfield to move to Chicago when he was 28, by which time he had written over 100 short stories and five novels, all unpublished.

== Novelist ==
In Chicago, Burnett found a job as a night clerk in the Northmere Hotel. His experiences with the people at the hotel, including gangsters, inspired Little Caesar (novel 1929, film 1931). The novel's overnight success landed him a job as a Hollywood screenwriter. Little Caesar became a classic movie, produced by First National Pictures (Warner Brothers) and starring then little known Edward G. Robinson.

Burnett was hired by Howard Hughes to write a draft of Scarface although director Howard Hawks disliked it and the script was rewritten by established playwright and screenwriter Ben Hecht.

He won the 1930 O. Henry Award for his short story "Dressing-Up", published in Harper's in November 1929. In 1980, he won the Mystery Writers of America's Grand Master Award.

Burnett published a novel or more a year and turned most into screenplays (some as many as three times). Burnett was similar to Dashiell Hammett and James M. Cain, who all wrote in the hardboiled genre of fiction. He often contrasted the corruption and corrosion of the city with the better life his characters yearned for. He portrayed characters who, for one reason or another, fell into a life of crime and were unable to climb out. They typically get one last shot at salvation but the oppressive system closes in and denies redemption.

== Screenwriter ==
Burnett wrote for many actors and directors, including Raoul Walsh, John Huston, John Ford, Howard Hawks, Nicholas Ray, Douglas Sirk, Michael Cimino, Humphrey Bogart, Ida Lupino, Paul Muni, Frank Sinatra, Steve McQueen, and Clint Eastwood. He received an Oscar nomination for his script for Wake Island (1942) and a Writers Guild nomination for his script for The Great Escape. In addition to his film work, he also wrote scripts for television and radio.

In High Sierra (1941), Humphrey Bogart plays Roy Earle, a hard-bitten criminal who rejects his life of crime to marry a crippled girl. In The Asphalt Jungle (1950), the most perfectly masterminded plot falls apart as each character reveals a weakness. In The Beast of the City (1932) starring Walter Huston, the police take the law into their own hands when the criminals walk free due to legal incompetence.

Burnett was called back by Howard Hughes to work on Vendetta.

== Later years ==
In later years, with his vision declining, he stopped writing and turned to promoting his earlier work. On his death in 1982, in Santa Monica, California, Burnett was interred in the Forest Lawn Memorial Park Cemetery in Glendale, California.

== Critical reception ==
Heywood Broun described Burnett's novel Goodbye to the Past as "written with all the excitement of Little Caesar, and ten times the skill".

== Bibliography ==
=== Novels ===
- Little Caesar (The Dial Press - 1929) - as 'Lincoln MacVeagh'
- Iron Man (The Dial Press - 1930) - as 'Lincoln MacVeagh'
- Saint Johnson (The Dial Press - 1930) - as 'Lincoln MacVeagh'
- The Silver Eagle (The Dial Press - 1931) - as 'Lincoln MacVeagh'
- The Beast of the City (Grosset & Dunlap - 1932) [not properly a Burnett novel; credit on the book reads "novelized by Jack Lait, from the screen story by W.R. Burnett"; the book was published concurrently with the release of the M-G-M film, circa March 1932]
- The Giant Swing (Harper - 1932)
- Dark Hazard (Harper - 1933)
- Goodbye to the Past: Scenes from the Life of William Meadows (Harper - 1934)
- The Goodhues of Sinking Creek (Harper - 1934)
- Dr. Socrates (O'Bryan House Publishing LLC - 2007) [Originally serialized in Colliers Weekly Magazine in 1935]
- King Cole (Harper - 1936)
- The Dark Command: A Kansas Iliad (Knopf - 1938)
- High Sierra (Knopf - 1941)
- The Quick Brown Fox (Knopf - 1943)
- Nobody Lives Forever (Knopf - 1943)
- Tomorrow's Another Day (Knopf - 1946)
- Romelle (Knopf - 1947)
- The Asphalt Jungle (Knopf - 1949)
- Stretch Dawson (Gold Medal - 1950) - The film Yellow Sky (1948) was based on an unpublished early version of the novel
- Little Men, Big World (Knopf - 1952)
- Adobe Walls: A Novel of the Last Apache Rising (Knopf - 1953)
- Vanity Row (Knopf - 1952)
- Big Stan (Gold Medal - 1953) - as "John Monahan"
- Captain Lightfoot (Knopf - 1954)
- It's Always Four O'Clock (Random House - 1956) - as "James Updyke"
- Pale Moon (Knopf - 1956)
- Underdog (Knopf - 1957)
- Bitter Ground (Knopf - 1958)
- Mi Amigo: A Novel of the Southwest (Knopf - 1959)
- Conant (Popular Library - 1961)
- Round the Clock at Volari's (Gold Medal - 1961)
- The Goldseekers (Doubleday - 1962)
- The Widow Barony (Macdonald - 1962)
- The Abilene Samson (Pocket Books - 1963)
- Sergeants 3 (Pocket Books - 1963)
- The Roar of the Crowd: Conversations with an Ex-Big-Leaguer (C.N. Potter - 1964)
- The Winning of Mickey Free (Bantam Pathfinder - 1965)
- The Cool Man (Gold Medal - 1968)
- Good-bye, Chicago: 1928: End of an Era (St. Martin's - 1981)

=== Short stories ===
- "Round Trip" (1929)
- "Dressing-Up" (1930)
- "Traveling Light" (1935)
- "Vanishing Act" (1955)

== Filmography ==
=== Screenwriter ===
==== Film ====
Year	Title	Director	Notes	Ref.
1931	The Finger Points	John Francis Dillon		
1932	The Beast of the City	Charles Brabin		
1932	Scarface	Howard Hawks		
1940	The Westerner	William Wyler	Uncredited	
1941	The Get-Away	Edward Buzzell		
1941	High Sierra	Raoul Walsh	Based on his 1940 novel	
1942	This Gun for Hire	Frank Tuttle		
1942	Wake Island	John Farrow		
1943	Crash Dive	Archie Mayo		
1943	Action in the North Atlantic	Lloyd Bacon		
1943	Background to Danger	Raoul Walsh		
1945	San Antonio	David Butler		
1946	Nobody Lives Forever	Jean Negulesco	Based on his 1943 novel	
1946	The Man I Love	Raoul Walsh	Uncredited	
1948	Belle Starr's Daughter	Lesley Selander		
1950	Vendetta	Mel Ferrer		
1951	The Racket	John Cromwell		
1954	Dangerous Mission	Louis King		
1954	Night People	Nunnally Johnson	Uncredited	
1955	Captain Lightfoot	Douglas Sirk	Based on his 1954 novel	
1955	Illegal	Lewis Allen		
1957	Accused of Murder	Joseph Kane	Based on his 1952 novel Vanity Row	
1959	The Hangman	Michael Curtiz	Uncredited	
1960	September Storm	Byron Haskin		
1961	The Lawbreakers	Joseph M. Newman		
1962	Sergeants Three	John Sturges		
1963	The Great Escape	John Sturges		
1963	Four for Texas	Robert Aldrich	Uncredited	
1968	Ice Station Zebra	John Sturges	Uncredited	
1969	Stiletto	Bernard L. Kowalski	Uncredited	

==== Television ====
Year	Title	Notes
1955	Screen Directors Playhouse	Episode: "Rookie of the Year"
1956	Studio 57	Episode: "Deadline"
1959	77 Sunset Strip	Episode: "Thanks for Tomorrow"
1960	The Untouchables	Episode: "The Big Squeeze"
1960	Naked City	Episode: "Debt of Honor"
1961	The Asphalt Jungle	Episode: "The Lady and the Lawyer"
1965	The Legend of Jesse James	Episode: "Manhunt"
1967	Off to See the Wizard	Episode: "Hell Cats"
1967	The Virginian	Episode: "The Fortress"
1968	Bonanza	Episode: "The Stronghold"

=== Adaptations of Burnett's works ===
==== Film ====
Year	Title	Source material	Ref.
1930	Little Caesar	Little Caesar	
1931	Iron Man	Iron Man	
1932	Law and Order	Saint Johnson	
1934	Dark Hazard	Dark Hazard	
1935	The Whole Town's Talking	"Jail Breaker"	
1935	Dr. Socrates	"Dr. Socrates"	
1936	36 Hours to Kill	"Across the Aisle"	
1937	Wine, Women and Horses	Dark Hazard	
1937	Wild West Days	Saint Johnson	
1937	Some Blondes Are Dangerous	Iron Man	
1939	King of the Underworld	"Dr. Socrates"	
1940	Dark Command	The Dark Command: A Kansas Iliad	
1940	Law and Order	Saint Johnson	
1941	High Sierra	High Sierra	
1941	Dance Hall	The Giant Swing	
1942	Bullet Scars	"Dr. Socrates"	
1946	Nobody Lives Forever	Nobody Lives Forever	
1948	Yellow Sky	Stretch Dawson	
1950	Colorado Territory	High Sierra	
1950	The Asphalt Jungle	The Asphalt Jungle	
1951	Iron Man	Iron Man	
1953	Law and Order	Saint Johnson	
1953	Arrowhead	Adobe Walls	
1955	Captain Lightfoot	Captain Lightfoot	
1956	I Died a Thousand Times	High Sierra	
1957	Accused of Murder	Vanity Row	
1958	The Badlanders	The Asphalt Jungle	
1963	Cairo	The Asphalt Jungle	
1967	The Jackals	Stretch Dawson	
1972	Cool Breeze	The Asphalt Jungle	

==== Television ====
Year	Title	Source material	Ref.
1961	The Asphalt Jungle	The Asphalt Jungle	

== Notes ==
- McGilligan, Patrick; Mate, Ken (1986). "W.R. Burnett: The Outsider". In McGilligan, Patrick (ed.). Backstory : interviews with screenwriters of Hollywood's golden age. University of California press. pp. 49–84.
