= The Jackals =

1967 film by Robert D. Webb

- Directed by: Robert D. Webb
- Written by: W.R. Burnett; Harold Medford
- Produced by: Robert D. Webb
- Starring: Vincent Price; Diana Ivarson; Robert Gunner
- Cinematography: David Millin
- Edited by: Peter Grossett
- Music by: Bob Adams
- Production company: Killarney Film Studios
- Distributed by: 20th Century-Fox
- Release date: November 10, 1967
- Running time: 96 minutes
- Country: South Africa
- Language: English

The Jackals is a 1967 DeLuxe Color Western film released by 20th Century-Fox and filmed at Killarney Film Studios in South Africa. A remake of 1948's Yellow Sky, it stars Vincent Price as a South African prospector named Oupa (grandpa) Decker and contract Fox star Robert Gunner. The film was the last directed by Robert D. Webb.

== Plot ==
Gold miner and his granddaughter living in South Africa are besieged by a group of bank robbers, led by 'Stretch' Hawkins for the prospectors' gold.

== Cast ==
- Vincent Price as Oupa Decker, the Prospector
- Diana Ivarson as Wilhemina Adelaide 'Willie' Decker
- Robert Gunner as Roger 'Stretch' Hawkins
- Bob Courtney as Dandy
- Patrick Mynhardt as Gotz
- Bill Brewer as Stoffel
- John Whiteley as Marico

== See also ==
- List of American films of 1967
- The Cape Town Affair
