= Dingaka =

- Directed by: Jamie Uys
- Written by: Jamie Uys
- Produced by: Jamie Uys
- Starring: Ken Gampu; Stanley Baker; Juliet Prowse; Bob Courtney
- Cinematography: Manie Botha; Judex C. Viljoen
- Edited by: John Jympson
- Music by: Eddie Domingo; Bertha Egnos; Basil Gray
- Distributed by: Embassy Pictures Corporation
- Release date: 30 June 1965 (U.S.)
- Running time: 98 minutes
- Country: South Africa
- Language: Afrikaans/English

Dingaka is a 1965 film by South African director Jamie Uys with the soundtrack by Bertha Egnos, Eddie Domingo and Basil Gray.

== Synopsis ==
Dingaka tells the story of a tribesman, Ntuku Makwena, who avenges the murder of his daughter according to traditional tribal laws. His act of revenge leads him to be tried under government laws, where justice for black people does not exist.

== Cast ==
The film stars Ken Gampu, Stanley Baker, Juliet Prowse and Bob Courtney.

Credited Cast
Actor	Character
Stanley Baker	Tom Davis
Juliet Prowse	Marion Davis
Ken Gampu	Ntuku Makwena
Alfred Jabulani	Mpudi
John Sithebe	Witch Doctor
Paul Makgoba	Masaba
Siegfried Mynhardt	Judge
Gordon Hood	Prosecutor
Flora Motaung	Rurari
Bob Courtney	Prison Chaplain
George Moore	Johnson, Legal Aid Society Secretary
Hugh Rouse	Bantu Commissioner
Simon Swindell	Doctor
Willem Botha	Clerk of the Court
Sophie Mgcina	Hymn Soloist
Jimmy Sabe	Lead singer
Daniel Marolen	Man of God
Cocky Tlhotlhalemaje	Priest
Clement Mehlomakulu	Dancer
Lulami Jabulani	Baby boy
Sandy Nkomo	Prisoner
Amigo Dira	Eben
Fusi Zazayokwe	Stick fighter
Thembi	Onika
Thandi	Letsea
Lemmy Special	Penny Whistle Player

== Production ==
Stanley Baker had just made Zulu in South Africa.
