= Going Up (musical) =

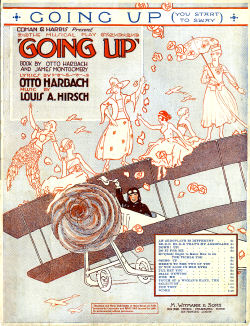
- Music: Louis Hirsch
- Lyrics: Otto Harbach
- Book: Otto Harbach and James Montgomery
- Basis: James Montgomery's play The Aviator
- Productions: 1917 Broadway; 1918 West End; 1923 film 1976 Broadway

Going Up is a musical comedy in three acts with music by Louis Hirsch and book and lyrics by Otto Harbach and James Montgomery. Set in the US city of Lenox, Massachusetts, at the end of World War I, the musical tells the story of a writer turned aviator who wins the hand of the high society girl that he loves by his daring handling of the joystick of a biplane. Popular songs included "Hip Hooray", "If You Look in Her Eyes", "Kiss Me", "Going Up", "Do It for Me", "The Tickle Toe", and "Down! Up! Left! Right!".

The musical was a hit on Broadway in 1917 and again the following year in London. Revivals and a film adaptation followed.

== Background and productions ==
The development of aviation and flying in the early years of the 20th century captivated the public's attention. Going Up is based on a 1910 play, The Aviator, by James Montgomery. The play took on new significance during World War I.

The musical was produced by George M. Cohan and Sam H. Harris and, after tryouts from November 15, 1917, in Atlantic City, New Jersey, it opened on Broadway at the Liberty Theatre in New York on December 25, 1917. It ran for 351 performances, directed by Edward Royce and James Montgomery, starring Edith Day and featuring the young Ed Begley. A full-size biplane was used in the production, delighting audiences. The production ran through October 1918, and three companies were sent out to tour it. Towards the end of the show's run at the Liberty Theatre, Janet Velie replaced Day in the role of Grace, and she continued in that role when the production went on a national tour of the United States.

In the meantime, Going Up was introduced to British audiences in Manchester, England, from May 13, 1918, before transferring to the Gaiety Theatre in London, opening on May 22, 1918, and running for an even more successful 574 performances. The London cast starred Joseph Coyne and Marjorie Gordon and featured Evelyn Laye. Reviews were uniformly positive. In Australia, Cyril Ritchard and Madge Elliott starred in the piece in 1919. The musical enjoyed various tours and revivals thereafter.

A 1976 US revival tried out at the Goodspeed Opera House, East Haddam, Connecticut, directed by Bill Gile. The production moved to Broadway, at the John Golden Theatre, on September 19, 1976, closing on October 31, 1976, after 49 performances. The director was Gile, and the choreographer was Dan Siretta (who was nominated for a Drama Desk Award for his work), with sets by Edward Haynes, costumes by David Toser and lighting by Peter M. Ehrhardt. The production starred Brad Blaisdell as Robert and featured Pat Lysinger (Miss Zonne), Stephen Bray (John), Kimberly Farr (Grace), Michael Tartel (Jules), Walter Bobbie (Hopkinson), Maureen Brennan (Madeleine), Noel Craig (James) and Ronn Robinson (Sam). The show was condensed into two acts and included three interpolated Hirsch songs: "Hello Frisco", from the Ziegfeld Follies of 1915, with lyrics by Gene Buck, sung by Miss Zonne and the Four Aviators; "I'll Think of You", from The Rainbow Girl, with lyrics by Rennold Wolf, sung by Grace and Robert; and "My Sumurun Girl", from The Whirl of Society, with lyrics by Al Jolson, sung by Miss Zonne and Sam.

A 1923 motion picture farce was based on the musical, with a screenplay by Raymond Griffith. It starred Douglas MacLean, Hallam Cooley, Francis McDonald, Hughie Mack and Marjorie Daw.

== Synopsis ==
At the Gordon Inn in Lenox, Massachusetts, bestselling author Robert Street is very popular and has an ego to match, pretending that writing a book about flying makes one a pilot; he has never been in a plane. His agent thinks it would be a great idea for him to go up in an airplane as a publicity stunt. His girlfriend Grace, whose parents would rather see her marry French flying ace Jules Gaillard, also thinks this is a good idea, as it would impress her father. Jules thinks so too: he challenges Robert to an air race! A mechanician, Sam Robinson, is sent for; but when he arrives, he is too stout to go up in the airplane, so Robert goes alone. The flight is successful: Robert wins the race and lands in one piece. He happily marries Grace.

== Roles and original Broadway and London casts ==
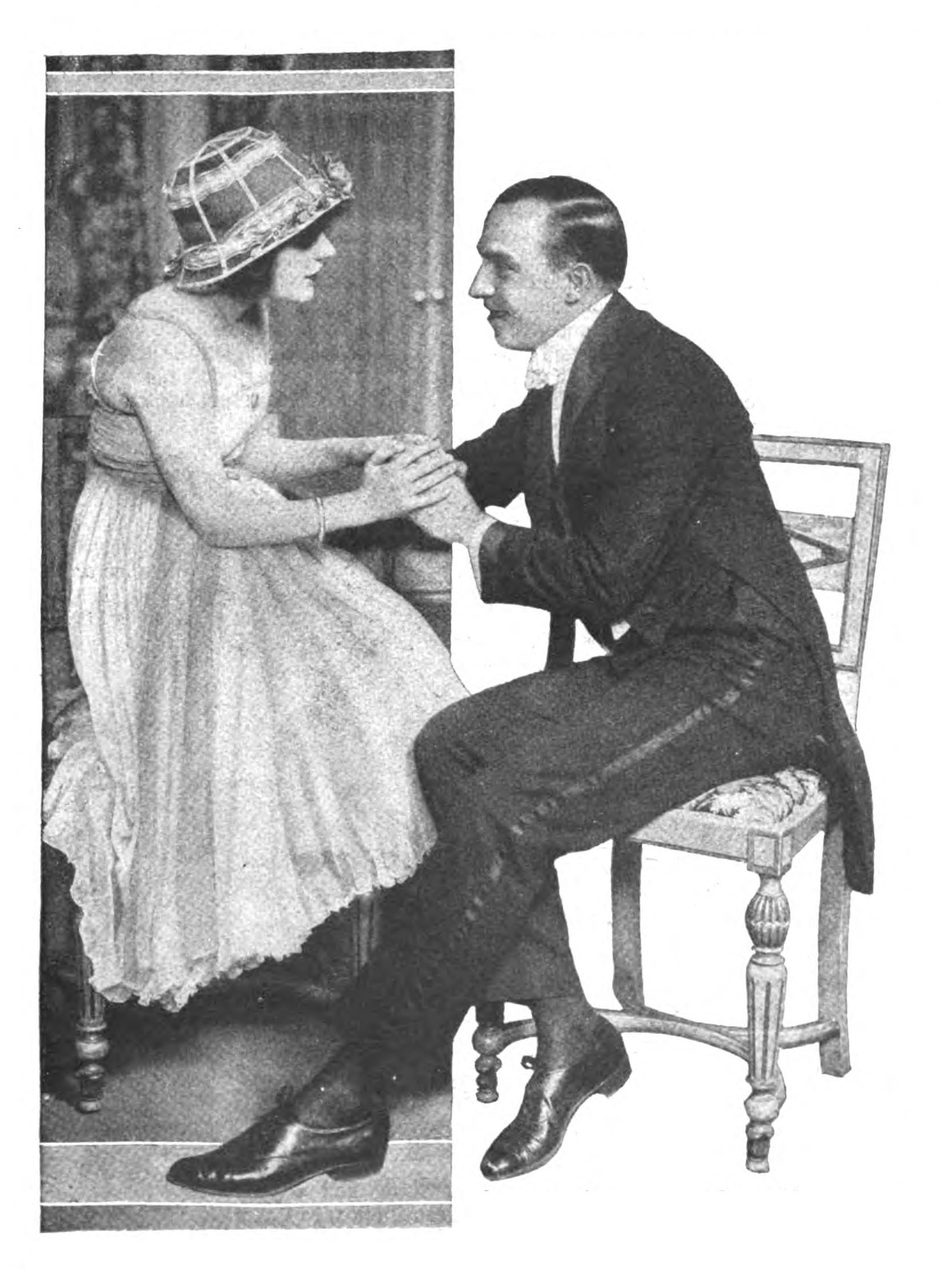
Marion Sunshine and Frank Otto in the original Broadway production

- Miss Zonne, a telephone girl – Ruth Donnelly; Ruby Miller
- John Gordon, manager of the Gordon Inn – John Park; Clifton Alderson
- F. H. Douglas, a chronic bettor – Donald Meek; Arthur Chesney
- Mrs. Douglas, his wife – Grace Peters; Elaine Inescort
- Jules Gaillard, their prospective French son-in-law – Joseph Lertora; Henry de Bray
- Grace Douglas, his fiancee – Edith Day; Marjorie Gordon
- Madeline Manners, her chum – Marion Sunshine; Evelyn Laye
- Hopkinson Brown, her fiance – Frank Otto; Austin Melford
- Robert Street, author of "Going Up", in love with Grace – Frank Craven (replaced by Bobby Watson); Joseph Coyne
- James Brooks, his publisher – Arthur Stuart Hull; Franklyn Bellamy
- Sam Robinson, a mechanician – Ed Begley; Roy Byford
- Louis, Gaillard's mechanician – Francois Vaulry; Louis Mathyl

== Musical numbers ==
- Overture

Act I

- No. 1. Paging Mr. Street – Ensemble and Miss Zonne
- No. 2. I'll Bet You – John Gordon and Ensemble
- No. 3. I Want a Determined Boy – Madeline Manners and Hopkinson Brown
- No. 4. If You Look in Her Eyes – Grace Douglas and Madeline
- No. 5. Going Up – Jules Gaillard and Ensemble
- No. 6. First Act, Second Act, Third Act (Finale Act I) – Robert and Grace

Act II

- Entr'acte (reprise of item 4)
- No. 7. The Touch of a Woman's Hand – Grace and Girls
- No. 8. Down, Up, Left, Right – Robert Street, Hopkinson, James Brooks and Sam Robinson
- No. 9. Do It for Me – Madeline and Hopkinson
- No. 10. (Everybody Ought To Know How to Do) The Tickle Toe – Grace and Ensemble
- No. 11. Kiss Me – Grace and Jules
- No. 12. She'll tell you what you're to do, dear – Grace and Robert
- No. 13. Finale Act II

Act III

- Entr'acte
- No. 14. Hip hooray, see the crowds appearing – Chorus
- No. 14a. There's a Brand New Hero – Jules, Madeline and Ensemble
- No. 15. Here's to the Two of You – Grace and Ensemble
- No. 16. You start to sway – Ensemble
- No. 17. Finale Ultimo – "You start to sway" (reprise)

== Recordings ==
His Master's Voice published six discs of songs from the show, featuring the London cast. The numbers were: "First Act, Second Act, Third Act" (Act I finale) with Coyne and Gordon; "Down, Up, Left, Right" with Coyne, Melford, Byford and Bellamy; "If You Look in Her Eyes" with Gordon and Laye; "Kiss Me!" with Gordon and de Bray; "The Tickle Toe", with Gordon, Bellamy and chorus; and "The Touch of a Woman's Hand", with Gordon and chorus. Several of the songs were re-issued on CD in the collection "Broadway Through the Gramophone (1844-1930): New York in European Footsteps" (4 volumes) on the Pearl label in 2002.
