= Patrick Mynhardt =

South African actor of state and film productions (1932–2007)

- Born: 12 June 1932; Bethulie, Free State, South Africa
- Died: 25 October 2007 (aged 75); London, England
- Education: De La Salle College, East London
- Alma mater: Rhodes University; Royal Central School of Speech and Drama
- Occupation: Actor
- Years active: 1955–2003
- Children: Johann Mynhardt
- Parent(s): Johannes Tobias Mynhardt and Elizabeth Beattie

Patrick Beattie Mynhardt (12 June 1932 – 25 October 2007) was a well-known South African film and theatre actor. He appeared in over 150 stage plays in South Africa and England, 100 local and international films, TV plays and serials as well as an opera. He died in London, where he was performing in his one-man show Boy from Bethulie at the Jermyn Street Theatre in the West End.

== Early life ==
The son of Johannes Tobias Mynhardt, a district surgeon and Elizabeth Beattie, an Irish emigrant, Patrick was born in Bethulie in the Free State. He matriculated from De La Salle College in East London. He studied drama at Rhodes University before joining the National Theatre Organisation in 1953 and touring South Africa. In 1954, he moved to London to attend the Central School of Speech and Drama. Performing on stage and for the BBC in Britain, he worked with actors including Peter Sellers, Burt Lancaster, Anthony Quinn, Richard Harris, Peter O'Toole, Michael Caine and Judi Dench. At the end of 1960 he returned to South Africa.

== Partial filmography ==
- Vadertjie Langbeen (1955) – Barry Cilliers
- Nor the Moon by Night (1958) – Jim (uncredited)
- The Hellions (1961) – Telegraph Operator
- As Ons Twee Eers Getroud Is! (1962) – Columnist, 'Ware Liefde'
- Stropers van die Laeveld (1962)
- Seven Against the Sun (1964) – Pte. Peters
- The Naked Prey (1965) – Safari Overseer / Slave Dealer / Irish Soldier
- Diamond Walkers (1965) – Kelly
- Der Rivonia-Prozess (1966) – Sergeant Dirker
- Africa Shakes (1966) – Clumsy waiter (uncredited)
- Kavaliers (1966) – Col. Dart
- The Cape Town Affair (1967) – Detective Myburgh (uncredited)
- The Jackals (1967) – Gotz
- Majuba: Heuwel van Duiwe (1968) – Rolf du Toit
- Vrolike Vrydag 13de (1969) – Harry Holt
- Petticoat Safari (1969)
- Lied in My Hart (1970) – Oskar Lichtenstein
- Scotty & Co. (1970) – Landdrost de Jager
- Jannie Tot Siens (1970) – George
- Shangani Patrol (1970) – Lt. Arend Hofmeyr
- Pressure Burst (1971) – Ollie Olwagen
- Three Bullets for a Long Gun (1971) – Hawkeye
- Z.E.B.R.A. (1971) – Charles Lester
- Die Voortrekkers (1973) – Piet Retief
- Die Saboteurs (1974)
- Forever Young, Forever Free (1975) – Doctor Du Toit
- Olie Kolonie (1975)
- Kniediep... (1975) – Valentine
- One Away (1976) – Chief Warder
- Thaba (1977) – André Grobbelaar
- Les Diamants du président (1977, TV Mini-Series)
- Target of an Assassin (1977)
- Zulu Dawn (1979) – Col. Harness
- A Game for Vultures (1979) – Hennie Muller
- Pour tout l'or du Transvaal (1979, TV Mini-Series) – Hasenfeld
- Gräset sjunger (1981) – Charlie Muller
- Torn Allegiance (1984) – du Toit
- Broer Matie (1984) – Jurie
- Skollie (1984) – Pappa
- Eendag vir Altyd (1985) – Oom Jurie
- The Lion's Share (1985) – The Boss
- Vyfster: Die Slot (1986) – Pappa (Paul Williams)
- Scavengers (1988) – Pavloski
- The Emissary (1988) – Brochard
- A Private Life (1989) – Uncle Bob
- Oddball Hall (1990) – Otto
- The Fourth Reich (1990) – Parliamentarian
- Orkney Snork Nie! (die movie): 'Dis Lekker By Die See' (1992) – Harry Vermaas
- The Visual Bible: Matthew (1993) – Herod Senior
- A Good Man in Africa (1994) – Muller
- Lipstiek Dipstiek (1994) – Oom Disselboom
- Hearts & Minds (1995) – Police general 1
- Suburban Bliss (1996, TV Series) – Hempies (1996)
- Operation Delta Force 2: Mayday (1997, TV Movie) – Vladimir Pasenko
- Pride of Africa (1997, TV Movie) – Hertzberg
- Cold Stone Jug (2003, TV Movie) – Herman Bosman
- Stander (2003) – Judge (final film role)
- Binnelanders (2006–2007) – Oom Drotskie (final TV role)
