= Colorado Territory (film) =

1949 film by Raoul Walsh

- Theatrical release poster
- Directed by: Raoul Walsh
- Screenplay by: Edmund H. North; John Twist
- Based on: High Sierra; 1940 novel by W.R. Burnett
- Produced by: Anthony Veiller
- Starring: Joel McCrea; Virginia Mayo; Dorothy Malone
- Cinematography: Sidney Hickox
- Edited by: Owen Marks
- Music by: David Buttolph
- Production company: Warner Bros. Pictures
- Distributed by: Warner Bros. Pictures
- Release date: June 3, 1949 (Colorado)
- Running time: 94 minutes
- Country: United States
- Language: English
- Budget: $1,224,000
- Box office: $2,694,000

Colorado Territory is a 1949 American Western film noir directed by Raoul Walsh and starring Joel McCrea, Virginia Mayo, and Dorothy Malone. Written by Edmund H. North and John Twist, and based on the novel High Sierra by W.R. Burnett, the film is about an outlaw Wes McQueen who is sprung from jail to help pull one last railroad job.

This version is a remake of the 1941 crime film High Sierra starring Ida Lupino and Humphrey Bogart, also directed by Walsh. The story was remade for a third time in 1955 as I Died a Thousand Times with Jack Palance and Shelley Winters.

== Plot ==
Notorious outlaw Wes McQueen breaks out of jail and heads off to the Colorado Territory to meet the man who arranged the escape, his old friend Dave Rickard. Along the way, the stagecoach he is riding in is attacked by a gang of robbers. When the driver and guard are both killed, McQueen kills or drives off the remaining gunmen, earning the gratitude of the other passengers, dreamer Fred Winslow and his daughter Julie Ann. Winslow has bought a ranch sight unseen and looks forward to making his fortune.

McQueen arrives at the ghost town of Todos Santos, where Reno Blake and Duke Harris are waiting for him, along with Reno's part-Indian girlfriend, Colorado Carson. After looking them over (and not liking what he sees), he heads off to a nearby town to meet an ailing Rickard, who asks McQueen to pull off one last big train robbery so they can both retire.

With the exception of Rickard, McQueen distrusts everybody else in the gang, including ex-private detective Pluthner, who recruited Reno and Duke, and Homer Wallace, the railroad informant. McQueen wants to go straight, but agrees to do the job out of gratitude and friendship.

While waiting for the robbery, McQueen decides to keep Colorado with him to avoid stirring up trouble between Duke and Reno. Although Colorado falls for him and tells him so, McQueen still dreams of marrying Julie Ann and settling down. When he visits the Winslow ranch, he finds it a poor, arid place. Winslow warns him that Julie Ann loves Randolph, a rich man back east. Winslow took her away because Randolph would never have married so far beneath him socially. McQueen, however, is undeterred.

The day of the robbery, a suspicious McQueen talks to Wallace's wife and discovers he has betrayed the gang for the reward money. Forewarned, McQueen uncouples the passenger cars in which the sheriff and his men are waiting in ambush, leaving them behind. Duke and Reno, as prearranged with Pluthner, also try to double-cross McQueen, but he is prepared for them too. He gets the drop on them, takes the money, and leaves the pair handcuffed together for the sheriff to capture and later hang. He and Colorado go to split the money with Rickard, only to find Pluthner over the old man's dead body. McQueen kills him, but is shot in the shoulder.

A wounded McQueen heads to the Winslow ranch, where Winslow helps Colorado remove the bullet, even after he is told who McQueen really is and what he has done. McQueen overhears Julie Ann tell her father they should turn him in for the reward money. Winslow, though, lies to the sheriff and posse when they show up.

McQueen is attracted to Colorado and proposes marriage. He plans to relocate Colorado to new territory in Mexico, but they are found hiding out in Todos Santos. He gives her the money, telling Colorado to bury it (she leaves it near the collection box for the mission). McQueen drives off her horse so she cannot follow him, then makes a desperate dash for the border. He is trapped in a long-deserted cliffside Indian settlement, but is too good a marksman for his pursuers to rush him. Colorado eventually arrives on foot.

The sheriff comes up with a devious plan. After stationing an Indian sharpshooter, he and all but two of his men ride away to a (fictional) back entrance. As the lawman had hoped, Colorado grabs a gun from one of the men, orders them to walk away, and takes the two remaining horses to McQueen. He emerges and is wounded by the sharpshooter. When the posse returns, Colorado shoots back, and the two lovers die in a hail of gunfire.

== Cast ==
- Joel McCrea as Wes McQueen
- Virginia Mayo as Colorado Carson
- Dorothy Malone as Julie Ann Winslow
- Henry Hull as Fred Winslow
- John Archer as Reno Blake
- James Mitchell as Duke Harris
- Morris Ankrum as United States Marshal
- Basil Ruysdael as Dave Rickard
- Frank Puglia as Brother Tomas
- Ian Wolfe as Homer Wallace
- Harry Woods as Pluthner
- Houseley Stevenson as Prospector
- Maudie Prickett as Mrs. Wallace

== Production ==
It was one of a series of Westerns featuring Dorothy Malone.

== Release ==
Colorado Territory had its premiere in Denver, Colorado on June 3, 1949. The following day, it opened at the Utah Theater in Salt Lake City. It grossed $12,000 at the Broadway theater and $11,000 at the West drive-in theater in Denver in its opening week, despite heavy rain on opening night. It was the first time that a film had opened in a drive-in theater at the same time as a regulation theater in Denver. It opened in 250 theaters in the Rocky Mountain area. The following week, it opened in Los Angeles, Boston and Cincinnati and was ranked fifth at the US box office.

== Reception ==
Bosley Crowther, the reviewer for The New York Times, considered it a "pretty darned good" remake of High Sierra (1941) and noted that Raoul Walsh directed them both. "In fact, the romantic assumptions and the sentimental liberties of its plot are more suited to the Western landscape than they were to a modern-day scene."

According to Warner Bros. records the film earned $1,666,000 domestically and $1,028,000 foreign.

== See also ==
- List of American films of 1949
