= Marjorie Gordon =

British actor and singer

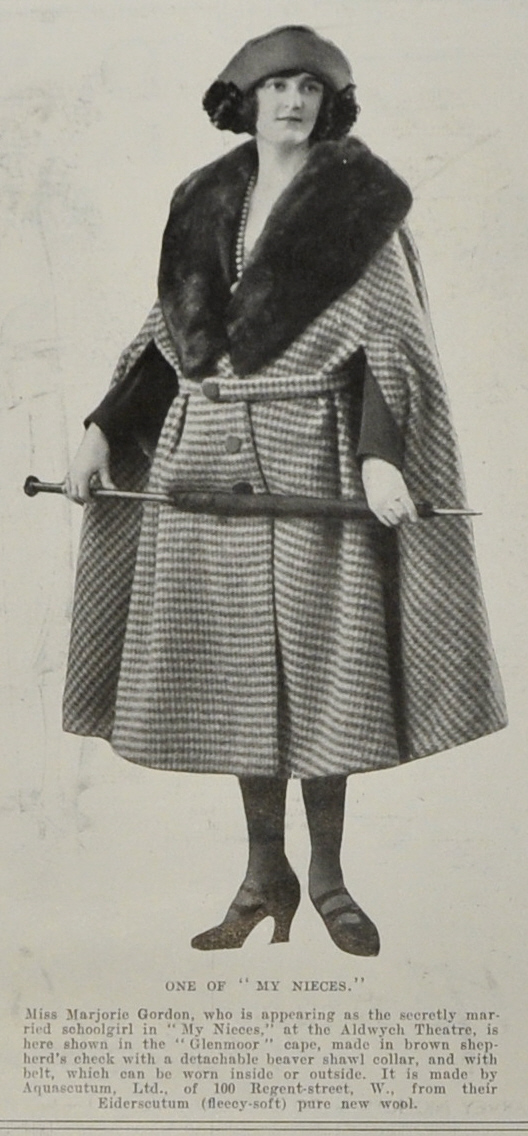
Gordon in 1921

Marjorie Gordon (12 November 1893 – 14 October 1983) was an English actress and singer.

Gordon was born in Southsea, Portsmouth, Hampshire as Marjorie Kettlewell. Her professional stage career began in 1915 on tour in the chorus of the D'Oyly Carte Opera Company. The next season, she was given the roles of the Plaintiff in Trial by Jury and Lady Psyche in Princess Ida. She also understudied and occasionally played the title role in Patience and Yum-Yum in The Mikado. She left D'Oyly Carte in June 1916 to understudy the role of Sylvia Dale at the Adelphi Theatre in London in the Rudolf Friml musical High Jinks, sometimes appearing in the role until July 1917 and touring in the role later that year.

Gordon starred in the title role in the romantic comic opera Valentine at the St. James's Theatre from January to April 1918. She next starred as Grace in the hit musical Going Up (1918–1919) at London's Gaiety Theatre. In July and August 1919 she played Rose Bunting in the musical Nobody's Boy at the Garrick. She then appeared in the Ivor Novello musical Who's Hooper? at the Adelphi Theatre (1919–1920). Next, she appeared in My Nieces at the Aldwych Theatre, London, in 1921. She also recorded songs from Going Up and Who's Hooper?. For the next two decades, she appeared in both musicals and plays. These included Stop Flirting (1923). She later appeared in a few films, playing Ruth Hopkins in Danger Trails (1935), Matron in All the Way to Paris (1967) and Passenger in Golden Rendezvous (1977).

Later stage roles included Midge in Tulip Time in 1935 at the Alhambra Theatre. Her last appearance on stage in London was in the "revusical promenade" Let's All Go Down the Strand at the Adelphi in 1939.

She died one month shy of her 90th birthday in Eastbourne, Sussex.
