= I Died a Thousand Times =

1955 film by Stuart Heisler

- Theatrical release poster
- Directed by: Stuart Heisler
- Written by: W. R. Burnett
- Based on: High Sierra; 1940 novel by W. R. Burnett (uncredited)
- Produced by: Willis Goldbeck
- Starring: Jack Palance; Shelley Winters; Lori Nelson; Lee Marvin; Gonzalez Gonzalez
- Cinematography: Ted McCord, A.S.C.
- Edited by: Clarence Kolster, A.C.E.
- Music by: David Buttolph
- Production company: Warner Bros. Pictures, Inc.
- Distributed by: Warner Bros. Pictures
- Release date: November 9, 1955 (United States)
- Running time: 109 minutes
- Country: United States
- Language: English

I Died a Thousand Times is a 1955 American CinemaScope Warnercolor film noir directed by Stuart Heisler. The drama stars Jack Palance as paroled bank robber Roy Earle, and Shelley Winters. It co-stars Lori Nelson, Lee Marvin and Gonzalez Gonzalez, with Lon Chaney, Earl Holliman, Perry Lopez, Richard Davalos and Howard St. John

I Died a Thousand Times is a scene-by-scene remake of the 1941 crime noir High Sierra, which was based upon a novel by W. R. Burnett and starred Humphrey Bogart as Earle. Between the two gangster films, the story had also been transformed into the 1949 Western Colorado Territory, with Joel McCrea.

== Plot ==
Roy "Mad Dog" Earle, an aging bank robber, intends to pull off one last heist before retiring. Sprung from prison by crime boss Big Mac, Earle agrees to plan the robbery of a resort hotel. His partners include the hotheaded Babe Kossuck, easy-going Red Hattery, and an "inside man" at the hotel, Louis Mendoza. Along for the ride is Marie Garson, a dance-hall girl whom Babe recently met.

Marie falls in love with Earle, but he is more interested in Velma Goodhue, the club-footed granddaughter of farmer Pa Goodhue whom Earle earlier befriended. Intending to use his share of the loot to pay for Velma's needed operation, Earle goes through with the robbery, only to be thwarted by the ineptitude of his gang, the treachery of the late Big Mac's successors, and the fickle Velma. With the still faithful Marie by his side, Earle makes a desperate escape into the Sierra Nevada, where a police sniper shoots him down.

== Cast ==
- Jack Palance as Roy Earle/Roy Collins
- Shelley Winters as Marie Garson
- Lori Nelson as Velma Goodhue
- Lee Marvin as Babe Kossuck
- Gonzalez Gonzalez as Chico
- Lon Chaney as Big Mac M'Gann
- Earl Holliman as Red Hattery
- Perry Lopez as Louis Mendoza
- Richard Davalos as Lon Preisser
- Howard St. John as Doc Banton
- Olive Carey as Ma Goodhue
- Ralph Moody as Pa Goodhue
- James Millican as Jack Kranmer
- Bill Kennedy as Sheriff

Uncredited (in order of appearance)
Peggy Maley	Jack Kranmer's girlfriend
Dub Taylor	Ed
Richard Reeves	sheriff's deputy
Chris Alcaide	sheriff's deputy
John Stephenson	Pfeiffer
Mae Clarke	Mabel Baughman
Hugh Sanders	Mr. Baughman
Nick Adams	bellboy
Fay Baker	woman in Tropico lobby
James Seay	man in Tropico lobby
Shep Houghton	guest at hotel
Myrna Fahey	Margie
Herb Vigran	Art
Dennis Hopper	Joe
Paul Brinegar	driver of bus
Wendell Niles [voice only]	radio announcer
Robert B. Williams	Ned the attendant
Nesdon Booth	Tom the heavyset man
Howard Hoffman	fisherman
Charles Anthony Hughes	extra
Larry J. Blake	Healy
Steve Darrell	plainclothes officer
Max Wagner	Charlie
Dennis Moore	police officer
Mickey Simpson	police officer
Gil Perkins	Slim
Don Dillaway	man at scene of accident
Mushy Callahan	man at scene of accident
Joe Brooks	man at scene of accident
Ed Fury	man at scene of accident holding tennis racket

== Background ==
W. R. Burnett called the film "a better picture" than High Sierra because he "cleaned up the script" from the original, cutting it down and shortening it. "It’s a much better picture, script-wise, although not pictorially, because Raoul Walsh did a hell of a job. Stuart Heisler is also a fine director; he never gets the credit he deserves. But those people! Who gives a damn what happens to Shelley Winters? Or Jack Palance, for that matter?"

Algernon, the stereotypical, comedy-relief character played by black actor Willie Best in the original film High Sierra was replaced by Chico, a Mexican stereotype played by Gonzalez Gonzalez.

Although they have no scenes together, the only times Nick Adams and Dennis Hopper appeared in the same film, were as bit players at the start of their film careers in this feature as well as in another 1955 release, Rebel Without a Cause.

== Reception ==
Bosley Crowther of The New York Times did not like the remake, specifically the screenplay and its inadvertent message, and wrote "Somehow it isn't quite as touching as it was fourteen years ago. Not by a lot-—and the trouble is not wholly Mr. Palance...But the reason this film is not so touching is because it is antique and absurd—-the kind of glorification of the gunman that was obsolescent when High Sierra was made. It is an insult to social institutions and to public intelligence to pull this old mythological hero out of the archives and set him on a mountain top again. The pretense is so blunt and sentimental that it makes the whole thing a total cliché. And the acting does not greatly improve it...It is obvious that High Sierra has come to pretty low ground."

In 2004, film critic Dennis Schwartz wrote "It's a remake that was hardly needed, but at least it keeps things the same as the novel and gives the viewer a chance to observe Jack Palance in the role Bogie made classic and Shelley Winters in Ida Lupino's role. Though both actors acquit themselves well, there's still no comparison with the original legendary actors. I have a thing about remakes of classics, believing there's no point to make them...I had no problems with the pic, in fact it works rather well. If it weren't an unnecessary remake I would think more highly of it."

The film has been shown on the TCM feature film series Noir Alley with Eddie Muller.

== See also ==
- List of American films of 1955
