= The Glory Brigade =

1953 film by Robert D. Webb

- Original film poster
- Directed by: Robert D. Webb
- Written by: Franklin Coen
- Produced by: William Bloom
- Starring: Victor Mature
- Cinematography: Lucien Ballard
- Edited by: Mario Morra
- Music by: Lionel Newman
- Production company: 20th Century-Fox
- Distributed by: 20th Century-Fox
- Release date: May 20, 1953
- Running time: 82 minutes
- Country: United States
- Language: English
- Budget: $850,000

The Glory Brigade is a 1953 American war film directed by Robert D. Webb. It stars Victor Mature and Alexander Scourby.

The film was referred to in M*A*S*H (1970), directed by Robert Altman.

== Plot ==
US Army engineer Lt. Pryor's detachment is assigned to work with Greek troops during the Korean War. The Greek forces are led by Captain Charos and Lieutenant Niklas.

== Cast ==
- Victor Mature as Lt. Sam Pryor
- Alexander Scourby as Lt. Niklas
- Lee Marvin as Cpl. Bowman
- Richard Egan as Sgt. Johnson
- Nick Dennis as Cpl. Marakis
- Roy Roberts as Sgt. Chuck Anderson
- Alvy Moore as Pvt. "Stoney" Stone
- Henry Kulky as Sgt. "Smitty" Smitowsky
- Russell Evans as Pvt. Taylor
- Greg Martell as Pvt. Ryan
- Gonzalo Magana as background soldier

Real soldiers were cast as extras, and all Greek characters were portrayed by actors of Greek descent. However, none are listed in the screen credits.

== Production ==
The film's original title was Baptism of Fire. Victor Mature was to have been loaned to RKO for Split Second, but Fox decided to keep him to star in The Glory Brigade. Filming began on September 15, 1952.

The film was shot at the United States Army Engineer School at Fort Leonard Wood, Missouri. The opening scene in which the bridge is blown up was filmed on the Osage River in Tuscumbia, Missouri.

While filming a scene at Lake of the Ozarks, Missouri, a demolition charge exploded underneath a boat, killing the boatman and injuring two others.

The Glory Brigade was Mature's first role as a combat soldier, and it was the only film in which Lee Marvin wore glasses in all of his scenes.

== Background ==
The film is based on the exploits of the Greek Expeditionary Force. While the Greek government had intended to send a full brigade to Korea, the UN victories in the autumn of 1950 led the expeditionary force to be downgraded to a battalion consisting of just under 900 men, named the Spartan Brigade. It was placed under the overall command of the US 1st Cavalry Division and later under the overall command of US 3rd Infantry Division. Though small in number, they played a crucial role in a handful of ultimately important operations. The unit was awarded the Presidential Unit Citation by President Harry Truman, and led one American commander to say: "Other than the Brits and the Aussies, nobody else was with us as much as the Greeks."

== Reception ==
In a contemporary review for The New York Times, critic Howard Thompson wrote that the film is "short in general impact and conviction" but contains "unpretentious, graphic realization of battle tension and movement" and is commendable for its "frank, sincere plea for true democratic understanding and harmony."

Lillian Blackstone of the St. Petersburg Times wrote: "It is forcibly told, with realistic fervor and hostilities that seem never-ending until the jubilation of final scenes."

Film critic Leonard Maltin called the film "passable." In his review for DVD Talk, Paul Mavis called it "[Disposable] entertainment posing as something important." Robert J. Lentz wrote that it was a "routine war film with an agreeable premise."

Richard Egan won the Golden Globe Award for Most Promising Newcomer – Male in 1953.

The film was released on DVD by 20th Century-Fox's Cinema Archives.

== Bibliography ==
- Lentz, Robert J. (2006). Lee Marvin: His Films and Career. McFarland. p. 28. ISBN 978-0-7864-2606-5.
- Lentz, Robert J. (2003). Korean War Filmography. Jefferson, North Carolina: McFarland & Company. ISBN 978-0-7864-1046-0. OCLC 50630520.
- McKay, James (2012). The Films of Victor Mature. McFarland. p. 98. ISBN 978-0-7864-4970-5.
