= The Cape Town Affair =

1967 spy film directed by Robert D. Webb

- Directed by: Robert D. Webb
- Written by: Dwight Taylor
- Screenplay by: Samuel Fuller; Harold Medford
- Produced by: Robert D. Webb
- Starring: Claire Trevor; James Brolin; Jacqueline Bisset
- Cinematography: David Millin
- Edited by: Peter Grossett
- Music by: Bob Adams; Joe Kentridge
- Production company: Killarney Film Studios
- Distributed by: 20th Century Fox
- Release date: September 19, 1967
- Running time: 100 min.
- Country: South Africa
- Language: English

The Cape Town Affair is a 1967 South African spy film directed and produced by Robert D. Webb, written by Dwight Taylor, produced by the 20th Century Fox at Killarney Film Studios in South Africa. The film stars Claire Trevor, James Brolin, and Jacqueline Bisset. It is a remake of the 1953 picture Pickup on South Street.

It was Brolin's first starring role. Both he and Bisset were under contract to Fox. He later said "I didn't like it much but we [he and Bisset] weren't bad."

== Plot ==
The film is set in 1967, at the height of the Cold War. On a Cape Town, South Africa, city bus, a young woman named Candy (Jacqueline Bissett) suspects she's being trailed by government agents. They have correctly deduced she is acting as a courier for Communist operatives. However, a small distraction occurs when a pickpocket, Skip McCoy (James Brolin), deftly lifts a wallet from Candy's purse before exiting at the next stop. Candy uses the diversion to slip away from her pursuers. But later, when checking her purse for the wallet, she discovers it is missing. The wallet's content, an envelope containing state secrets on microfilm, is now in the possession of McCoy. Naturally, Candy's employers are displeased, and they order her to find and retrieve the stolen microfilm—or else. As a result, Candy begins to question her own allegiances.

Meanwhile, government agents solicit local Cape Town authorities for their assistance in tracking down the pickpocket. With valuable assistance from underworld contact Samantha "Sam" Williams (Claire Trevor), they locate the elusive McCoy who proves uncooperative at first. But when he becomes acquainted with Candy and begins to grasp the evil of those behind the theft of government secrets, his patriotic fervor becomes aroused. Before long, he is surprised to find himself aligned with both Candy and the police in tracking down and exposing enemies of the state.

This plot appears to be a remake of the 1953 movie Pickup on South Street starring Richard Widmark. It even includes the tie selling informant character played by Thelma Ritter.

== Cast ==
- Claire Trevor as Sam Williams
- James Brolin as Skip McCoy
- Jacqueline Bisset as Candy
- Bob Courtney as Capt. Herrick, Security Branch
- John Whiteley as Joey
- Gordon Mulholland as Warrant Officer Du Plessis
- Siegfried Mynhardt as Fenton
- James Gordon White as Sgt. Beukes
- Gabriel Bayman as Mohammed the Fence
- Raymond Matuson as Lighting Louis / Espinosa
- Patrick Mynhardt as Myburgh

== Production ==
Some of the Cape Town locations include Long Street, apartments along Beach Road in Mouille Point and Green Point, the harbour docks now within the Waterfront, the town centre near the railway station and city hall.

== Reception ==
Commentators describe the film as dull, slow-paced, poorly acted and tedious. The film does, however, paint an interesting picture of life in South Africa under apartheid as seen from the point of view of official government policy. All the leading characters are white and street scenes contain few non-whites.

== See also ==
- The Jackals
