= Victor Ivanoff =

Victor Arkhipovich Ivanoff (Виктор Архипович Иванов, 2 July 1909 Vilnius, Russia – 1990 Johannesburg, South Africa), a son of a Don Cossack general, was a South African artist, cartoonist and singer.

== Biography ==
Ivanoff attended a Cossack military school and proved to be skilled at singing, and drawing under the guidance of General Nikolai Karpon. After the October Revolution of 1917 when Bolsheviks came to power, the Ivanoff family was opposing the regime and fled to Yugoslavia in 1920 where Victor enrolled to study architecture at the University of Zagreb. His studies were abandoned and he joined General Platon Don Cossack Choir on their tour which included visiting South Africa in 1936. Africa appealed to Ivanoff and he stayed on, first being employed as political cartoonist by Noticias, a Portuguese newspaper in Lourenço Marques, before finding work as a cartoonist at the Afrikaans newspaper in Johannesburg, Die Vaderland, a position he held for 37 years. Dr Willem van Heerden, editor of Die Vaderland, remembered that Ivanoff brought him with two cartoons and several drawings, one of which "showed Stalin as a monster on a heap of skulls, with vultures on the lookout in the sky. It was a picture of abhorrence, without the alleviating humour that later became such a distinctive feature of his cartoons…" Joel Mervis recounts that Ivanoff was recruited from Moçambique by the Rand Daily Mail, but because of his poor English was misdirected to Die Vaderland and was promptly snapped up.

One of Ivanoff's early commissions was a series of caricatures of members of parliament carried out under the guidance of Piet Grobler, Minister of Native Affairs and a member of J. C. Smuts' cabinet. His cartoons of Smuts had great impact, so much so that the United Party held Ivanoff partly responsible for their loss in 1948. He found himself at home with the Russian community in South Africa – his knowing a large number of Russian folk songs enhancing his popularity. He felt that Afrikaners and Russians had a great deal in common, such as a love of freedom and wide open spaces. During his career he created more than 12 000 cartoons, but his dream of being considered a serious artist saw him signing up for art lessons from Pierneef and a study trip to Europe. Working in oils and sepia tint, he produced mainly landscapes, people and animals, and took part in some joint exhibitions and ten solo exhibitions in the Transvaal.

In 1945 Victor Ivanoff drew serial comic strips Kalie die Kuiken and Jors voer die Oorlog for the magazine Die Brandwag. His singing was of a high standard and saw his occasional appearance in local operatic productions. He was also a founder member of the South African Opera Association. His widow, Eveline, scattered his ashes in Russia's Don River.
