= Bob Courtney =

British-born South African actor and broadcaster (1922–2010)

- Born: Christopher Robert Courtney Leaver; 31 October 1922; Dorset, England
- Died: 24 October 2010 (aged 87); Johannesburg, South Africa
- Citizenship: South Africa
- Occupation: Actor

Christopher Robert Courtney Leaver (31 October 1922 – 24 October 2010) was a British-born South African actor and broadcaster. He appeared in more than twenty film roles and worked as an on-air presenter and broadcaster on Springbok Radio. Additionally, Courtney co-founded Radio Today in 1996.

== Biography ==
Christopher Robert Courtney Leaver on 31 October 1922, in Dorset, England, UK. He trained as an accountant. A self-taught pianist, he was drafted into the Royal Air Force's entertainment corps as an entertainer during World War II. Courtney served as an RAF entertainer in North Africa, Greece and Italy. He met two South African entertainers, Siegfried Mynhardt and Uys Krige, in Rome, Italy, near the end of World War II. Krige and Mynhardt persuaded Courtney to move to South Africa.

Courtney emigrated to South Africa in 1946 and began working at the South African Broadcasting Corporation (SABC) in 1947, using the shortened name Bob Courtney. He hosted many of the SABC's most well-known radio shows during the 1940s.

In 1950, Courtney began hosting the Welcome Little Stranger children's show on the now defunct Springbok Radio. His radio name on the show was "Uncle Bob." However, his most famous job at Springbok Radio was hosting the hugely popular quiz show Pick a Box, which aired for fourteen years from 1960 until 1974. Courtney toured South Africa with the show throughout its airing, attracting large crowds of fans. In one instance, the Mayor of East London sent a limousine to meet Courtney at the East London Airport, where he had arrived to host Pick a Box in the city. Courtney broadcast Pick a Box from a variety of unusual locations including Antarctica, the Cango Caves, the Union-Castle Line and a mine shaft. The popular radio show ended in 1974. Pick a Box was briefly resurrected as a television quiz show in the 1980s with Courtney once again as its host. However, the TV version was not a hit and was quickly cancelled.

Courtney's other shows on Springbok Radio included the Eyegene Jackpot game show, which aired from the 1950s until the 1970s, and Stop the Music, which aired for ten years. He also launched the Springbok show Greet the Bride, which would air for five days per week for twenty years on the radio. He attempted to reopen Springbok Radio after the station was closed in 1985. However, the South African Broadcasting Corporation decided against the relaunch of Springbok Radio in 1994, citing financial concerns.

Courtney also co-founded a radio station, Radio Today, in 1996 with former Springbok Radio broadcaster Peter Lotis. The station's targeted audience were listeners in their 50s and older. The station attracted more than 70,000 listeners, but did not attract advertisers. Courtney hired a financial adviser, who saved Radio Today, though Courtney disagreed with some of the station's new financial and creative directions. He retired from Radio Today in 2008.

Courtney's acting career spanned several decades and included more than twenty film credits. His film roles included Lord Oom Piet in 1962, Kruger Millions, All the Way to Paris, Dingaka and Hans en die Rooinek. He was also a founding member of the South Africa National Theatre. In the 1980s, he ran a steakhouse in Johannesburg.

Bob Courtney died in Johannesburg at the age of 87 on 24 October 2010, just one week before what would have been his eighty-eighth birthday. His funeral was held at the St. Martin's-in-the-Veld Anglican Church in Dunkeld, Gauteng. Courtney was survived by his wife, Yvonne, and their two children.
