= Robert D. Webb =

American film director (1903–1990)

- Born: January 8, 1903; Clay City, Kentucky
- Died: April 18, 1990 (aged 87); Newport Beach, California
- Occupation: Film director
- Years active: 1936–1970
- Spouse: Barbara McLean (m. 1951–1990)

Robert D. Webb (January 8, 1903 – April 18, 1990) was an American film director. He directed 16 films between 1945 and 1968. He won the Academy Award for Best Assistant Director for In Old Chicago, the last time that category was offered.

== Biography ==
Webb was born in Clay City, Kentucky in 1904 and moved to San Francisco with his family when he was five.

His older brother Millard went to work in the film industry, creating the sets for Rin Tin Tin films, which sparked Webb's own interest. Webb's son Jim later said his father "worked as a gofer and did just about everything (for the studios). He did lighting, grip, was a property man, even some makeup work. He worked his way up and became second assistant director. Then he became assistant director under Henry King. That's where he really learned the directing business."

=== Assistant director ===
Webb's first film as assistant director under Henry King was The Country Doctor (1936). It was made at 20th Century Fox where Webb would work for most of his career.

Webb was assistant director on Sins of Man (1936), directed by Otto Brower, then did five films in a row with King: Ramona (1936), Lloyd's of London (1936), Seventh Heaven (1937), Alexander's Ragtime Band (1938) and In Old Chicago (1938). These were the studio's most prestigious projects. Webb won an Oscar for Chicago.

After Just Around the Corner (1938) with Irving Cummings he went back to working for King on Jesse James (1939), Stanley and Livingstone (1939), Little Old New York (1940), Maryland (1940) and Chad Hanna (1940). Because King made so many location pictures, Webb learned how to fly to help with location scouting.

Webb assisted Rouben Mamoulian in Blood and Sand (1941) and Henry Hathaway on Ten Gentlemen from West Point (1942), and worked with King on A Yank in the R.A.F. (1941), The Black Swan (1942), and The Song of Bernadette (1943).

=== Early features as director ===
Webb wanted to direct and the studio gave him a short, No Escape (1943). It was sufficiently well received that they entrusted him with two low budget features, The Caribbean Mystery (1945) and The Spider (1945).

=== Second unit work ===
King asked him to work as second unit director, and so Webb did that on King's Margie (1946), Captain from Castile (1947), and Prince of Foxes (1949), the latter two being expensive epics.

Webb did second unit for Fritz Lang on American Guerrilla in the Philippines (1950) and Lloyd Bacon on The Frogmen (1951) before being reunited with King on David and Bathsheba (1951). While working on the latter he started dating the film's editor, Barbara Maclean, who he would marry in 1951.

He worked with Henry Hathaway on The Desert Fox: The Story of Rommel (1951), Joseph M Newman on Red Skies of Montana (1952), and Jean Negulesco on Lydia Bailey (1952) and Lure of the Wilderness (1952), with location work in Georgia swamps. He did some uncredited directing on Way of a Gaucho (1952).

=== Director ===
Fox allowed Webb to return to directing with The Glory Brigade (1953), a Korean War film with Victor Mature shot in Fort Leonard Wood, Missouri.

He then directed the Romeo and Juliet inspired sponge fishing film Beneath the 12-Mile Reef (1953), with Robert Wagner, which became a big hit by being the third movie shot in CinemaScope.

He did White Feather (1955), a Western with Wagner, Jeffrey Hunter and 1954 Debra Paget. This was followed by Seven Cities of Gold (1955), a historical adventure film with Richard Egan, which was produced by Webb and his wife. It was his favourite film.

Webb did a science fiction film, On the Threshold of Space (1956), and then The Proud Ones (1956), a Western with Hunter and Robert Ryan. In June 1956 his contract with Fox was renewed and they said he would direct The Iron Butterfly however the film was not made.

Webb directed Elvis Presley's first film, Love Me Tender (1956), a Western where Presley was billed after Egan and Paget. It became a huge hit.

Webb directed 1957 The Way to the Gold (1957), a Western with Hunter. In 1957 he tried to get Fox to finance a musical, Crazy Boy. He had another project called Meeting on a Summit which was not made.

He did an episode of Rawhide then was hired by Alan Ladd to do a Western for Ladd's own company, Guns of the Timberland (1960) the first dramatic movie for singer Frankie Avalon.

Webb directed a swashbuckler for Sam Katzman at Fox, Pirates of Tortuga (1961). He directed a film for Associated Producers Incorporated (API), the low budget division of 20th Century Fox, about women in a Japanese prisoner of war camp, Seven Women from Hell (1961).

=== Second unit directing ===
Webb returned to second unit directing with A Gathering of Eagles (1963) for Delbert Mann. He did Captain Newman, M.D. (1963) for David Miller then directed an episode of Temple Houston starring Hunter, before returning to second unit with The Agony and the Ecstasy (1965) and Assault on a Queen (1966).

=== Later years ===
Webb returned to directing with two films shot for Fox in South Africa, both remakes of old Fox films: The Jackals (1967) and The Cape Town Affair (1967).

Webb lived the last 21 years of his life on Balboa Island. He was survived by his wife, Barbara (d 1996) who was a top editor at Fox. He was also survived by his son, three grandchildren and four great-grandchildren. he died in 1990.

== Selected filmography ==
- Corsair (1931) – assistant director
- The Country Doctor (1936) – assistant director
- Sins of Man (1936) – assistant director
- Ramona (1936) – assistant director
- Lloyd's of London (1936) – assistant director
- Seventh Heaven (1937) – assistant director
- Alexander's Ragtime Band (1938) – assistant director
- In Old Chicago (1938) (assistant director) (Academy Award winner for Best Assistant Director)
- Just Around the Corner (1938) – assistant director
- Jesse James (1939) – assistant director
- Stanley and Livingstone (1939) – assistant director
- Little Old New York (1940) – assistant director
- Maryland (1940) – assistant director
- Chad Hanna (1940) – assistant director
- Blood and Sand (1941) – assistant director
- A Yank in the RAF (1941) – assistant director
- Ten Gentlemen from West Point (1942) – second unit director
- The Black Swan (1942) – location director
- No Exceptions (1943) (short) – director
- The Song of Bernadette (1943) – unit manager
- The Caribbean Mystery (1945) – director
- The Spider (1945) – director
- Margie (1946) – production manager
- The Captain from Castile (1947) – second unit director
- Prince of Foxes (1949) – second unit director
- American Guerrilla in the Philippines (1950) – second unit director, production manager
- The Frogmen (1951) – second unit director
- David and Bathsheba (1951) – second unit director
- The Desert Fox: The Story of Rommel (1951) – second unit director
- Red Skies of Montana (1951) – second unit director
- Lydia Bailey (1952) – second unit director
- Lure of the Wilderness (1952) – second unit director, associate producer
- Way of a Gaucho (1952) – director of some scenes
- The Glory Brigade (1953) – director
- Beneath the 12-Mile Reef (1953) – director
- Seven Cities of Gold (1955) – director, producer
- White Feather (1955) – director
- The Proud Ones (1956) – director
- On the Threshold of Space (1956) – director
- Love Me Tender (1956) – director
- The Way to the Gold (1957) – director
- Rawhide (1959) – episode "Incident at Dangerfield Dip" – director
- Guns of the Timberland (1960) – director
- Pirates of Tortuga (1961) – director
- Seven Women from Hell (1961) – director
- A Gathering of Eagles (1962) – second unit director
- Captain Newman, M.D. (1963) – second unit director
- Temple Houston (1964) episode "The Guardian" – director
- The Agony and the Ecstasy (1965) – second unit director
- Daniel Boone (1965) episode "The Prophet" – director
- Assault on a Queen (1966) – second unit director
- The Jackals (1967) – director
- The Cape Town Affair (1967) – director, producer
- A Little of What You Fancy (1968) (documentary) – director
- Dancing Shoes (1969) (documentary, short) – director
- The Mystery in Dracula's Castle (1973) – assistant director
