= List of Zimbabwean musicians =

This is a list of musicians and musical groups from Zimbabwe.

== Musical groups ==
- Barura Express – band
- Bhundu Boys – jit and chimurenga music band
- The Green Arrows – wha wha group
- Hohodza – band
- Mbira dzeNharira – mbira band
- Mechanic Manyeruke and the Puritans – gospel music group
- R.U.N.N. family – mbira-inspired reggae and rhumba group
- Siyaya – music and dance group

== Musicians ==
- Holy Ten (born 1998) – Hiphop artist (Leader of the youth speaker of truth)
- Flint Bedrock (born 1985) – pop singer-songwriter
- Berita (born 1991) – Afrosoul and Afropop singer
- Mkhululi Bhebhe (born 1984) – contemporary gospel
- Charles Charamba (born 1971) – gospel singer
- Olivia Charamba (1999–1999) – gospel singer
- John Chibadura (1957–1999) – sungura guitarist, singer, and songwriter
- Brian Chikwava (born 1971) – writer and musician
- Simon Chimbetu (1955–2005) – singer-songwriter and guitarist
- James Chimombe (1951–1990) – singer and guitarist
- Musekiwa Chingodza (born 1970) – mbira and marimba player
- Chirikure Chirikure (born 1962) – musician and songwriter
- Stella Chiweshe (1946-2023) – mbira player and singer-songwriter
- Dizzy Dee (1999–1999) – Australia-based reggae artist
- Leonard Dembo (1959–1996) – guitarist and singer-songwriter; member of the band Barura Express
- Tehn Diamond (born 1985) – Zimbabwean hip hop musician and rapper
- Chartwell Dutiro (born 1957) – mbira player and singer-songwriter
- Mbuya Dyoko (1944–2013) – mbira player
- John Edmond (born 1936) – Rhodesian folk singer
- Tendayi Gahamadze (born 1959) – mbira player and singer-songwriter; member of Mbira dzeNharira
- Michael Gibbs (born 1937) – England-based jazz composer
- Mudiwa Hood (born 1985) – Zimbabwean hip hop/gospel artist and actor
- Derek Hudson (1934–2005) – English-born conductor and composer
- Ngonidzashe Kambarami (born 1983) – urban grooves artist
- Victor Kunonga (born 1974) – Afrojazz singer-songwriter
- Forward Kwenda (born 1963) – mbira player
- Hope Masike – mbira player and percussionist and singer
- Ignatius Mabasa (born 1971) – writer and musician
- Alick Macheso (born 1968) – singer-songwriter and guitarist
- Safirio Madzikatire (1932–1996) – actor and musician
- Takunda Mafika (1983–2011) – mbira player
- Cosmas Magaya (1953-2020) – mbira player
- Tkay Maidza (born 1996) – Australia-based singer-songwriter and rapper
- Lovemore Majaivana (born 1954) – Ndebele music singer-songwriter
- Zeke Manyika (born 1955) – England-based rock and roll singer-songwriter and drummer
- Leonard Mapfumo (born 1983) – urban grooves and hip hop artist
- Thomas Mapfumo (born 1945) – chimurenga music artist
- Chiwoniso Maraire (1976–2013) – mbira player and singer-songwriter
- Dumisani Maraire (1944–1999) – mbira player and singer-songwriter
- Mashasha (born 1982) – guitarist and singer-songwriter
- Maskiri (born 1980) – hip hop artist and rapper
- Dorothy Masuka (1935-2019) – South Africa-based jazz singer
- Paul Matavire (1961–2005) – blind jit musician
- Louis Mhlanga (born 1956) – South Africa-based Afrojazz singer-songwriter and guitarist
- Obi Mhondera (born 1980) – England-based pop songwriter
- Vusa Mkhaya (born 1974) – singer-songwriter
- Eric Moyo (1982-2023) – singer
- Tongai Moyo (1968–2011) – sungura singer-songwriter
- August Msarurgwa (1920–1968) – composer
- Audius Mtawarira (born 1977) – Australia-based urban grooves artist
- Oliver Mtukudzi (1952–2019) – Afrojazz singer-songwriter and guitarist
- Sam Mtukudzi (1988–2010) – Afrojazz musician
- Anna Mudeka – England-based musician
- Carol Mujokoro – gospel music artist
- Ephat Mujuru (1950–2001) – mbira player
- Mono Mukundu (born 1970) – music producer, composer, and multi-instrumentalist
- Prince Kudakwashe Musarurwa (1988-2020) – Afrojazz musician
- Isaac Musekiwa (1930-1991) – DR Congo-based soukous artist and saxophonist
- Busi Ncube (born 1963) – mbira player and singer
- Alfred Nenguwo - jazz singer and songwriter
- Albert Nyathi (born 1962) – poet and singer-songwriter
- Jah Prayzah (born 1987) – Afropop and Afrojazz musician
- Roki (born 1985) – Madagascar-born urban grooves artist
- Kingsley Sambo (1936–1977) – jazz guitarist
- Herbert Schwamborn (born 1973) – Germany-based hip hop and electronic music artist; member of the band Söhne Mannheims
- Jonah Sithole (1952–1997) – chimurenga music artist and guitarist
- Solomon Skuza (1956–1995) – pop singer-songwriter
- Buffalo Souljah (born 1980) – Zimdancehall and reggae
- Shingisai Suluma (born 1971) – gospel music artist
- Takura (born 1991) – house music and hip hop artist
- System Tazvida (1968-1999) – singer-songwriter
- Tembalami (born 1982) – gospel artist
- Biggie Tembo Jr. (born 1988) – jit musician
- Clem Tholet (1948–2004) – Rhodesian guitarist and folk singer
- Garikayi Tirikoti (born 1961) – mbira player
- Diego Tryno (born 1998) – urban contemporary and hip-hop musician
- Tocky Vibes (born 1993) – singer, lyricist, songwriter
- Viomak – protest musician and activist
- Tarisai Vushe (born 1987) – Australia-based singer who appeared on Australian Idol
- Edith WeUtonga (born 1979) – Afrojazz singer-songwriter and bass guitarist
- Jonathan Wutawunashe – gospel artist
- Leonard Zhakata (born 1968) – sungura and adult contemporary music artist, songwriter, poet and social commentator
- Charity Zisengwe – contemporary Christian music artist

·

== See also ==
- List of Zimbabwean artists
