= List of mbira players =

The following is a list of players of the mbira, an African plucked lamellophone musical instrument.

== Traditional Zimbabwean mbira masters ==
- Tendayi Gahamadze
- Thomas Mapfumo
- Chartwell Dutiro
- Cosmas Magaya
- Dumisani and Chiwoniso Maraire
- Nyati-Mbira Planet Namibia
- Ephat Mujuru
- Forward Kwenda
- Garikayi Tirikoti
- Jah Prayzah
- Mbira dzeNharira
- Mbuya Dyoko
- Musekiwa Chingodza
- Oliver Mtukudzi
- Stella Chiweshe
- Anna Mudeka

== Other mbira players ==
- Chris Berry
- David Bowie
- Erica Azim
- Genesis- Guitarist Steve Hackett played some parts of kalimba on the Wind and Wuthering album.
- Glenn Kotche of Wilco
- Jamie Muir of King Crimson
- Hope Masike
- Imogen Heap
- Konono No.1
- Lisa Hannigan
- Mal Webb
- Maurice White and Philip Bailey of Earth, Wind, & Fire
- Njacko Backo
- Phil Collins on the album No Jacket Required, the song "Long Long Way to Go" with Sting on backing vocals
- Prince Kudakwashe Musarurwa
- Tendai Maraire of Shabazz Palaces
- Tinashé
- Trent Reznor of Nine Inch Nails
- Francis Bebey
- Joachim Cooder
- AcousticTrench
