= Ivy Kombo =

Zimbabwean gospel musician

Ivy Kombo Kasi
- Born: Ivy Kombo; 16 April 1975 (age 51); Harare, Zimbabwe
- Origin: Zimbabwean
- Genres: Gospel Music
- Occupations: Singer, songwriter
- Instrument: Keyboard
- Years active: 1992–present
- Label: Gospel Train Records

Ivy Kombo (born 16 April 1975) is a Zimbabwean gospel music artist and lawyer based in the United Kingdom. She is also co-founder of Nguva Yakwana Gospel Show.

== Early life ==
Kombo was born in 1975 in Harare, Zimbabwe, and grew up in Glen View 4 suburb. She did her secondary education at St John's Chikwaka. She relocated to the United Kingdom in 2006. She studied LLB Law and LLM International Commercial Law at the University of Bedfordshire the MSC Project Management at University of Northampton.

== Career ==
Ivy Kombo started singing when she was 10 years old in primary school and she composed her first song "Be Thou My Vision" at St John's Chikwaka High School. The track was part of the popular album "Mufudzi Wangu", which was released in 1994 as the debut album of the popular gospel music group; Ezekiel Guti Evangelical Association (EGEA) Gospel Train. The group was made up of Ivy Kombo, her twin sister Anne Kombo and Carol Chivengwa Mujokoro.

Her professional career actually started in 1992 when she joined the Ezekiel Guti Evangelical Association Gospel Train (EGEA) popularly known as Gospel Train which was founded by Admire Kasi.

Later, Kombo recorded her debut album in 1993 titled Mufudzi Wangu with the group. EGEA Gospel Train recorded four successful albums between 1992 and 1996; Mufudzi Wangu, Ndinokudai Jesu, Vimba naJehovah and Kutenda. Around 1996, Kombo and Carol Mujokoro Chivengwa left the group to pursue solo careers. Between 1993 and 2003, Ivy Kombo recorded songs annually.

As a solo artist Kombo released several radio hits including Nguva Yakwana, Handidzokre Shure, Mwari Ndimweya and Wawana Jesu.

In 2000, Kombo became the director of Gospel Train Records and co-founder of Nguva Yakwana Celebrations gospel shows in 2002 which featured such South African artists as Thembinkosi, Lundi Tyamara, and Buhle. In 2001, Ivy Kombo was part of Zimbabwe Broadcasting Corporation vision 2020 music initiative along with Chiwoniso Maraire and Busi Ncube. In 2002, Kombo was a founding member of Ruvhuvhuto Sisters during her solo career which consisted of Plaxedes Wenyika, Fortunate Matenga and the late Jackie Madondo. The group's first project was the Miss Malaika beauty pageant promotional jingle held in 2003.

== Discography ==
Albums

As part of EGEA Gospel Train:

- Mufudzi Wangu 1993/4
- Ndinokudai Jesu 1994
- Vimba naJehovah 1995
- Kutenda 1996

As a Solo Artist:

- Ndaidziwanepi Nyasha 1997
- Hosanna Wekudenga 1998
- Denga Rinotaura 2000
- Nyengetera 2000
- Mufudzi Wangu Special (2nd Edition) 2001- featuring Jackie Madondo
- Nguva Yakwana 2002
- Handidzokere Shure Part 1 2003
- Handidzokere Shure Part 2 2003
- Two Minutes 2008
- Like Mt Zion 2019
- The Tribute 2021

Singles

- Ndiyaniko 2019
- Takazvipihwa 2022

== Awards ==
- Best Gospel Artists - Tinotenda Siyabonga Annual Music Awards 2000
- Best Selling Gospel Artist - National Arts Merit Awards 2003
- Best Female Gospel Artist - National Arts Merit Awards 2003

== Personal life ==
Ivy Kombo is married to Admire Kasi, the founder of UpperView International Ministries.
