= Admire Kasi =

Zimbabwean music producer and promoter

- Born: Zimbabwe
- Education: University of Buckingham (LLM)
- Occupations: Evangelist, Music producer, Promoter
- Known for: Founder of the Nguva Yakwana Gospel Concert; Founder of Gospel Train Records; Founder of Upperview Ministries International
- Spouse: Ivy Kombo

Admire Kasi, also known as Addy Kasi, is a Zimbabwean gospel music producer and promoter who rose to prominence when he launched the first gospel festival in Zimbabwe, Nguva Yakwana Gospel Concert. His influence was generated when he became an international pastor for ZAOGA church, during that time he launched a lunchtime prayer movement that became popular spreading around Harare CBD in the 90s.

Kasi's first wife was named Sarah. They were married for 25 years. They had three children together. Kasi and Ivy have several children together and have faced challenges in gaining public acceptance as a couple due to several public scandals.

== Background ==
Admire Kasi is a charismatic preacher and the founder of Upperview Ministries International, a Pentecostal ministry headquartered in Harare. He started evangelism in the late 80s with Ezekiel Guti becoming a popular evangelist in the church before forming his ministry in 2003.

In 1993, Admire Kasi formed Gospel Train Records which was the first gospel oriented recording studio in Zimbabwe. He then started the Ezekiel Guti Evangelical Association (EGEA) Gospel Train band in 1994 which worked with Ezekiel Guti during EGEA crusades around Zimbabwe, the band included notable artists Ivy Kombo, Elizabeth Manyowa, Carol Mujokoro, Jackie Madondo, Dereck Mpofu, Toggy Chivaviro, Tambawoga and guitarist Mono Mukundu. He then established Gospel Train Records in the late 90s which was one of the first gospel music record labels in Zimbabwe.

Admire Kasi started Nguva Yakwana Gospel Concert becoming the first music producer to introduce gospel music concerts in Zimbabwe in 1999 and established its first festival in 2000 in the Harare Gardens, the event featured top gospel artists from around Southern Africa mostly South Africa. After the first two events in the Harare Gardens, the festival moved to the Harare International Conference Center which had more capacity to contain the crowd who attended the event annually. In 2003, the show faced some criticism from Christian reporters who thought the show tolerated some foreign morals from what the Christian community in Zimbabwe was used to at that time. Kasi's concert became one of the first gospel music events to bring international artist who performed at the concert including Rebecca Malope, Thembinkozi Booi, Vuyo Mokoena, Lundi Tyamara and Buhle Nhlangulela. Zimbabwean artists like Mai Patai, Evelyn Mhanga and Toggy Chivaviro had their break though the concert in the early 2000s.

He holds a master in Law from the University of Buckingham and has authored some books including Hello Jonah and From The Womb With God. He was announced by the Herald Zimbabwe's People on The Move as one of the first young executives to manage a large corporation in 1986 when he was appointed ZIMNAT Life Assurance provincial manager.

== Nguva Yakwana Gospel Concert ==
Nguva Yakwana Gospel Concert is a gospel music event that was launched in 2000 by Admire Kasi. The event was held annually from 2000 to 2006 when Kasi relocated to the UK, the concert took a break then reemerged in 2019 when he visited Zimbabwe with Ivy Kombo who is the show organiser. The 2020 and 2021 editions could not be done because of COVID19 regulation.

Nguva Yakwana Gospel Concert
- Genre: Gospel Music
- Locations: Harare International Conference Center, Zimbabwe
- Years active: 1999, 2000–2019, will recommence in 2022
- Founders: Admire Kasi
- Organizer: Gospel Train Records

- Nguva Yakwana Part 1, 2000
- Nguva Yakwana Part 2, 2001
- Nguva Yakwana Explosion, 2002
- Nguva Yakwana Festival, 2003
- Nguva Yakwana Festival, 2004
- Nguva Yakwana Festival, 2005
- Nguva Yakwana Festival, 2006
- Nguva Yakwana Reloaded 2019

== Further read ==
Studies on the Zimbabwean gospel music industry which includes the impact of Nguva Yakwana Gospel Concert shows that were created by Admire Kasi.

- Pentecostal Gospel Music in Zimbabwe
- Survival Dynamics and Zimbabwe Music Industry
- Gospel Music in Zimbabwe, University of Pretoria
