= Highfield, Harare =

Highfield
- High density Suburb
- Nickname: Fiyo
- Location within Zimbabwe
- Coordinates: 17°53′42″S 30°59′26″E
- Urban ward: Highfield
- Established: 1900

Government
  - Type: Harare City Council
- Elevation: 1,586 m (5,203 ft)
- Time zone: UTC+2 (CAT)

Highfield is a high-density suburb or township in Harare, Zimbabwe built to house Rhodesians of African origin. Highfield was founded on what used to be Highfields Farm. It is in southwest Harare and is bordered by Glen Norah (formerly Baxter Farm) to the southwest, Waterfalls to the southeast, Willowvale and Southerton in the north.

The suburb is particularly known for its association with the country's liberation movement and with cricket, as the hometown of Hamilton Masakadza, the first black Zimbabwean to score a Test century.

== History ==
On 4 January 2026, heavy rains triggered flooding in the Highfield area of Harare.

== Politics ==
Highfield is represented by the Highfield constituency in the National Assembly of the Parliament of Zimbabwe. From 2008 to 2023 it was represented by Highfield East and Highfield West.

== Notable people ==
=== Politics, religion and business ===
- Ezekiel Guti - founding father of indigenous African pentecostalism
- Joshua Nkomo – founding father, former vice-president of Zimbabwe, former president of PF ZAPU.
- Robert Mugabe – founding father, president of Zimbabwe; lived in Highfield before becoming president in 1980.
- Enos Nkala – nationalist, ZANU PF founded in his Highfield house.
- George Tawengwa - owner of Mushandirapamwe Hotel, was the first black person to buy a farm in then Rhodesia
- Paul Tangi Mhova Mkondo – nationalist, political prisoner, philanthropist, entrepreneur
- Ndabaningi Sithole – founding father, nationalist politician

=== Sport ===
- Vusi Sibanda - Zimbabwean cricketer
- Hamilton Masakadza - Zimbabwean cricketer
- Tinotenda Kadewere - professional footballer
- Elton Chigumbura - Zimbabwean cricketer
- Prosper Utseya - Zimbabwean cricketer
- Stuart Matsikenyeri - Zimbabwean cricketer
- Tatenda Taibu - Zimbabwean cricketer
- Patrick Gada - Zimbabwean cricketer

=== Entertainment ===
- Oliver Mtukudzi – musician, born and raised in Highfield
- Thomas Mapfumo – musician
- Marshall Munhumumwe and the Four Brothers – musicians, formed in Highfield
- James Chimombe – musician
- Safirio Madzikatire (Mukadota) – actor and musician; used the Cyril Jennings Hall in Old Highfield for rehearsals.
- Tinashé – British singer-songwriter.
- Masimba Hwati - Artist, born in the early 1980s

=== Others ===
- Ezra Wenjere – ordinary boy, born and raised in Highfield.
- Ian Chitauro -

== See also ==
- Harare
- Epworth
- Mbare
