= Tawengwa family =

Zimbabwean family

The Tawengwa Family are a prominent and influential family of Zimbabwe engaged in business, agriculture and politics. The original family business was Mushandira Pamwe Buses, which was established in the 1950s by George Tawengwa Snr. In 1960, George Tawengwa became the first black person in Southern Rhodesia to purchase a 1,872.0 hectare (4,626 acre) commercial farm, then called Rhodesdale Farm (renamed Zimdale Farm after independence, in 1980). George Tawengwa and his wife Mabel Tawengwa made news headlines in 1977 when they purchased five farms in cash transactions. George Tawengwa also built the Mushandira Pamwe Hotel in Highfield, Harare in 1972. George Tawengwa's sons, Solomon (1940–2004) and Charles (born 1954), also became prominent businessmen and farmers. They both served as Mayor of Harare. Solomon Tawengwa was put on the United States sanctions list in 2003 and remained there until his demise the following year.
