= Zim Hip Hop Awards =

Zimbabwe Hip Hop Awards (ZHHA)
- Description: Outstanding achievements in the hip hop industry in Zimbabwe
- Country: Zimbabwe
- First award: 2011; 15 years ago

Television/radio coverage
- Network: ZiFM Stereo; Power FM Zimbabwe

Zim Hip Hop Awards also known as Zimbabwe Hip Hop Awards (abbreviated as ZHHA) is an annual awards event created to recognise outstanding Zimbabwean hip hop artists in Zimbabwe as well as diaspora based hip hop artists. The awards are presented in December each year.

== History ==
Zimbabwe Hip Hop Awards were established in December 2011 and the first edition was held at 7 Arts Theater in Harare becoming the first awards ceremony for hip hop artists in Zimbabwe. The awards have been key to putting Zimbabwean hip hop on the national and regional map.

== Entry ==
For nomination, an artist’s music has to be released on radio or public media platforms from the previous cycle of November which runs to October in that current year. An artist must provide credible work and supporting articles as references to show actual release of material. The ZHHA panel will select nominees and the list of nominees is publicised in press a month before the event.

The awards are presented every second week of December and the winners' list is released to the press. Winners receive a framed plaque at the ceremony.

== Categories ==
The ceremony presents 24 award categories.

- Best Male
- Best Female
- Best Newcomer
- Best Hip-Hop Duo/Group
- Best Album
- Song of the year
- Best Producer
- Best Collaboration
- Best Brand Supporting Local HipHop
- Best Promoter
- Best Diaspora
- Best Radio DJ
- Best Club DJ
- Best Gospel Act
- Best Dance Act
- Best underground
- Best alternative
- Best Online Media
- Best Journalist.
- Video Of The Year & video director of the year
- Best hip hop hustle.
- Best hip hop verse (sweet 16 award)
- Hip hop personality of the year
- People’s choice

== Awards editions ==
- Zim Hip Hop Awards 2011, 7 Arts Theater, Harare
- Zim Hip Hop Awards 2012, 7 Arts Theater, Harare
- Zim Hip Hop Awards 2013, 7 Arts Theater, Harare
- Zim Hip Hop Awards 2014, Wing Wah International, Harare
- Zim Hip Hop Awards 2015, Club 1+1, Long Cheng Plaza, Harare
- Zim Hip Hop Awards 2016, Club 1+1, Long Cheng Plaza, Harare
- Zim Hip Hop Awards 2017, Zimbabwe Music Academy, Bulawayo
- Zim Hip Hop Awards 2018, Pabloz, Sam Levy's Village, Harare
- Zim Hip Hop Awards 2019, Club 1+1, Long Cheng Plaza, Harare
- Zim Hip Hop Awards 2020, Rainbow Towers Hotel, Harare

== Past winners ==
| Category | 2012 | 2013 | 2014 | 2015 | 2016 | 2017 | 2018 | 2019 | 2020 | 2021 | Notes |
|---|---|---|---|---|---|---|---|---|---|---|---|
| Best Hip Hop Promoter | Outspoken | Magamba | Mark Vusani | | Prezo | Jackson Zimboy | | Zimboy | Cottage47 | Magamba Network | |
| Best Producer | Begotten Sun | Take Fizzo | Simba tagz | Anonzi Xndr | Fun F | Take Fizzo | Rayo Beats | Jamal | Jonn The Producer | Tha Dawg | |
| Best Star Fm freestyle artist | Alka Nemo | | | | | | | | | | Award only awarded in the inaugural year of ZHHA, 2012. |
| Best Album | "Syn City" by Synik | "The Feeling Ain’t Fair" by Few Kings | "Blood Money" by Jacob Poy | "Year of The Vin" by Cal_Vin | "Sharky" by Soko Matemai | "Better than Your Album" by Noble Stylz | "Mariachi" by Muzukuru | King 98 | Jungle Loco – Bata Ma Streets | "Risky Life" by Holy Ten | |
| Best newcomer | Synik | Marcques | Peekay | Guluva 7 | Takura | Tulk Munny | Tanto Wavie | N Jay Oh | Holy Ten | Voltz JT | |
| Best collaboration | "Power cut" by Synik ft Metaphysics, Junior Brown and MC Chita | Zvidhori remix | | "Zvenyu" by Ti Gonzi (feat. Baller Mandizha) | "Mainini" by 8L ft Tocky | "Get Mine" by Myke Pimp ft Jnr Brown and TRK | "Mambo" by Asaph ft Tha Dawg and F Mcswag | "Wacko" by King 98 feat. Nasty C & Laylizzy | "Ginde" by Crooger ft. Asaph & Ti Gonzi | "Rasta" by Mile (feat. Marques) | |
| Best radio DJ | Davies Mugadza (Power FM) | Davies Mugadza (Power FM) | Tbass | Emmitty Smooth | Mox (Star FM) | Lady K & PD The Ghost for The Fixx ZiFM Stereo | Lady K & PD The Ghost for The Fixx ZiFM Stereo | Thorne | Lady K & PD The Ghost for The Fixx ZiFM Stereo | DJ Mox | |
| Best female artist | Trae Yung | Trae Yung | Blackbird | Blacperl | Awa Khiwe | Kikky Badass | Natasha Muz | Phreshy | Kikky Bad Ass | Kikky Bad Ass | |
| Best Male artist | Maskiri | Tehn Diamond | Peekay | Cal_Vin | TiGonzi | Stunner | Takura | Ti Gonzi | R Peels | Holy Ten | |
| Best Video | "H town" by Tatea da Mc ft Crimson Blu | "10/10" by Mudiwa Hood | "Hamuko" by Schingy | "Handivhundustwe" by Nastro | "Inna Me Head" by Stunner (feat. Sir Ford) | "Slayin" by Mudiwa Hood | "Mambo" by Asaph | Scrip Mula & SimDoc with King Santa | "Ginde" by Crooger | "Chini Juu" by King 98 | (From 2020 category is called Video of the Year and Video Director of the year) |
| Best Gospel hip hop artist | Mudiwa Hood | Mudiwa Hood | Mudiwa Hood | | Courtney Antipas | Mudiwa Hood | Courtney Antipas | Caespidor | Courtney Antipas | NTA | |
| People’s choice award | Stunner | Mudiwa Hood | Tricky j | | Stunner | Kikky Badass | Brythreesixty | Mudiwa Hood | Holy Ten | Holy Ten | |
| Life time achievement award | Metaphysics | Chiwoniso Maraire | mizchif | | | | | | | | |
| Best Hip Hop Group | | Few Kings | MMT | Art Department | Burg Boyz | Few Kings | Mula Nation | Mula Nation | Crisswiss & The Dot | Crooger & Kikky (Winner) | (From 2021 the category is named Best Hip Hop Group/Duo) |
| Best Online Media | | | Mcpotar | The Lounge –Kronic | Zimbuzz | Keep it Real Fridays | The ZimTainment | Red Nation | Zimsphere | Zazise Media | |
| Best Hustle | | | | | Jnr Brown | Mudiwa Hood | Takura | King 98 | R Peels | Tashamiswa | |
| Best Underground | | | | Doc Freezy | Psyko Tektonic | Indigo Saint | H-files | Gunx Da Pharaoh | Prozac | Malcom Mufunde | |
| Best Diaspora | | Kapital K | Rhyme Assassin | Rhyme Assassin | Karizma | Hillzy | Yung Tyran | GT Beats | Mlue Jay | Awa Khiwe | |
| Best Hip Hop Verse | | | | | Gze – Imhandu 2nd verse | "Ngena ka1" Guluva Sev7n | Ti Gonzi – ‘Misi Haifanane’ | Ti Gonzi (Kure) | ‘Ginde’ – Asaph | Indigo Saint - 93 Till Infinity Freestyle | |
| Best Dance Crew | Antivirus | Hood Crankers | DNA | | Super Geeks | Super Geeks | Antivirus | | | | (Category was called Best Jibilika dance act in 2012 Edition) |
| Best Alternative | | | | | Tytan | Simba Tagz | | | Indigo Saint | Dough Major | |
| Best Local Family Supporting Hip Hop | | | | | | Hip Hop 263 by Naboth Rizla | | | | | |
| Best TV Media | | | | | Trey Ncube – Basement Cyphers | | | | | | |
| Best Journalist | | | Sindiso Dube (NewsDay) | Prometheus | Sindiso Dube (NewsDay) | Bongani Ndlovu | Mike Shoko | | Takudzwa Kadzura | Mthabisi Tshuma | |
| Best Positive Social Contribution | | Jibilika | | | | | | | | | |
| Best Solo Dancer | | Adrean Zinasi | tanaka roki | | John Cole | | | | | | |
| Best Corporate Brand Supporting Hip-hop | | Arizona Spur | | | | | Zvanhuwa Fashions | Changamire Hip Hop Festival | Kingsville Clothing | Big Bass | |
| Best Album Art | | Road to Fame | | | | | | | | | |
| Best High School | | Overdose | | | | | | | | | |
| Best Club DJ | | P Styles | Raydizz | Linsay the dude | Raydizz | | Raydizz | DJ Krimz | | | |
| Best Freestyle | | Alka Nemo | | | | | | | | | |
| MVP | | Jnr Brown | | | | | | | | | |
| Song of the Year | | "Madrinks" by Jnr Brown | "Ma1" by Peekay | "Zikhupani" by Cal_Vin | | "No Stress" by Tehn Diamond | "Mambo" by Asaph | "Kure" by Ishan (feat. Ti Gonzi) | "Ndaremerwa" by Holy Ten | "These Days" by Voltz JT | |
| Best Brand | | | | | Volt | | | | | | |
| Hip Hop Personality of the Year | | | | | | | Mudiwa Hood | Stunner | Asaph | R Peels | |

=== Special awards ===
| Year | Award name | Recipient | Notes |
|---|---|---|---|
| 2019 | Honorary Award from the Zim Hip Hop Family | Oliver Mtukudzi | Posthumous award |
| 2020 | Artist of the Decade | Stunner | |

== Controversy ==
The Zim Hip Hop Awards has had some controversies surrounding its presentation and nomination criteria with several reporters and fans expressing concern when nominees are released.

=== Other Awards ===
| Year | Award name | Recipient | Notes |
|---|---|---|---|
| 2019 | Best Male Hip hop Artist | Asaph | Bulawayo Arts award |
| 2023 | Artist of the Year | D Craze | Pumula Awards |
