= Ngonidzashe Kambarami =

- Also known as: Ngonie; Ngoni
- Born: Ngonidzashe Kambarami; 19 October 1983 (age 42); Mabvuku, Harare Province, Harare
- Origin: Mabvuku, Harare Province, ZW
- Genres: R&B, Soul, Urban Grooves, Ragga, Jazz, Mbira, Museve
- Occupations: singer, songwriter, arranger, dancer, choreographer
- Instruments: Vocals, acoustic guitar, keyboard, drums
- Years active: 2002–present
- Labels: Highway Entertainment, Highway Entertainment (Pvt) Ltd.

Ngonidzashe Kambarami (born 19 October 1983), popularly known as Ngonie, is a Zimbabwean musician who has produced three albums to date: Ndinoimba, Angu Mashoko, and idenderedzwa. His debut song "Ndiwe Chete" launched his music career in 2002, leading to the release of his first album.

== Biography ==
Ngonie was born Ngonidzashe Kambarami on 19 October 1983 in Mabvuku Harare. He is the last of four boys and was educated at Donnybrook Primary School and Mabvuku High School in Mabvuku and also at Foundation College in Old Tafara, Harare, Zimbabwe.

== Discography ==
=== 2002: Ndinoimba ===
==== Track listing ====
- 1. Bvuma (4.18)
- 2. Ndapererwa (4.43) features Raps' Finest
- 3. Ndiwe Chete (5.01)
- 4. Donna (4.22)
- 5. Tell Me Why (3.45) features Kevin from Trinity as Rastah Kev
- 6. Ndinochema (4.56)
- 7. C'mon now (1.13) an interlude
- 8. Wakaenda (5.14)
- 9. Tamba (5.10)
- 10. Happy Birthday (3.42) featuring Gumiso
- 11. Wabata moyo wangu (4.27) written by Janet
- 12. Ndinotenda (4.45)
- 13. Wakaenda (5.07) – Stardust Mixx

This album was produced by the duo of Tatenda "Take 5" Jenami and Sipho "TBA" Mkhuhlane of that Squad.

=== 2004: Angu Mashoko ===
==== Track listing ====
- 1. Shamwari (5.00) features Alexio Kawara
- 2. Angela (5.39)
- 3. Tsika (5.02)
- 4. Nherera (4.44) features Diana Samkwange
- 5. Dekadzo (4.11)
- 6. Rudo neChido (5.04)
- 7. Mazakwatira (3.49) with Leonard Mapuranga
- 8. Pedyo Newe (6.02)
- 9. Kuswera Newe (4.28)
- 10. Jabulani (3.44) featuring Carmelita
- 11. Shoko (4.38)
- 12. Kundivenga (3.43)
- 13. Zunza (Radio edit of Mazakwatira) (3.30)

This album was produced by Wofman (Pedyo Newe) and Gordon Mutekedzi, TBA and Lyton Ngolomi for Highway Entertainment, 4RoomsOfLove Ngonie's own label.

=== 2007: idenderedzwa ===
==== Track listing ====
- 1. Ndamuwana (5.39)
- 2. Thembie (4.22)
- 3. Haumurovi (4.02)
- 4. Ndichakuda (4.42)
- 5. Back Home (3.39) features Diana Samkange
- 6. Hupenyu (4.08)
- 7. Swedera (4.45) features Sir Calabash
- 8. Kuchema/Purezha (6.32)
- 9. Nhinhi (4.53)
- 10. Wandichada (4.57) featuring Leonard Mapfumo
- 11. Mwari (5.54)
- 12. Mumwe wangu (3.50)
- 13. Thembie Guitar Mix (4.22)

This album was produced by Joseph "Joey" Madziyire, Sipho "Playboy" Mkuhlane, Lyton Ngolomi, Clive "Mono" Mukundu and McDonald "McDee" Chidavaenzi for Ngonie's private label Highway Entertainment. The album is distributed by Metro Studios under a Third Party Distribution Licence and was released into stores on 20 December 2007.

== Awards ==
Ngonie received an award for Best Urban Grooves Male from the Zimbabwe Music Awards (ZIMA) 2004. His a cappella performance of "Donna" at the Spotlight 2002 show with Another Trybe also received the award for best performance in its category.

== TV appearances and performances ==
He has appeared on Spotlight and Superstar as a contestant, and has had guest appearances on the popular Zimbabwean show Studio 263 shown on ZBC (Zimbabwe Broadcasting Corporation) and Obe tv (Sky channel 223). His songs "Angela" and "Shamwari" have also been used as background music for a number of episodes of this show.

== Other links ==
- The Daily Mirror
- The Daily Mirror
- ZimVibes Profile
- The Herald It's not all Rosy Ngoni- 24 December 2005 December 2005
