= Sakhile =

Sakhile is an African name which may refer to:

- Sakhile, singer in Ndebele music
- Sakhile Dube, Zimbabwean beauty queen
- Sakhile Nyoni, Zimbabwean pilot
- Sakhile, Mpumalanga a township near Standerton, South Africa
