= Kikky Badass =

- Also known as: Goddess of Too Much Sauce
- Born: Christabell Stembeni Mahlungwa; April 15, 1995 (age 31); Harare, Zimbabwe
- Genres: Zimbabwean hip hop
- Occupations: Rapper; singer; songwriter
- Instruments: Vocals; rapping; Piano
- Years active: 2012–present
- Label: Independent

Christabell Stembeni Mahlungwa (born April 15, 1995), professionally known as Kikky Badass, is a Zimbabwean rapper and singer-songwriter. She gained notoriety in 2017 after the release of her music video to "Body Conversations," a song which is featured on her debut album titled Queen of The South.

== Early life and education ==
Kikky was born in Harare, Zimbabwe. She completed her basic education at Avondale Primary School and her secondary education at Trust Academy both located in Harare. She studied sociology at Midlands State University.

== Career ==
In October 2017, Kikky released her debut album called "Queen of The South" which featured Nigerian rapper Ycee and Zimbabwean rappers Marcus Mafia and Jnr Brown. The debut album was also produced by WizzyProbeatz. In 2017, Kikky Badass engaged in a lyrical war with female rapper Tiara Baluti which resulted in diss songs such "Strive Masiiwa" by Kikky and Mash It Up by Tiara. The dispute started after Tiara was interviewed on social media series Keep It Real Fridays. In the interview Tiara said she wouldn't want to ever work with Kikky on a song. Kikky reacted by going on Instagram live and Twitter where she called Tiara arrogant and that she should stay in her lane.

In 2018, she released a five track EP titled "Mambokadzi" which features Zimdancehall artist, Freeman on a track called "Rewind" In 2019, she released the single "One One" becoming one of her most streamed songs.

In 2020, she released the album "Bloodline". Throughout the 2020s, she released numerous singles and collaborations with many other artists including Bagga and Crooger.

== Discography ==
=== Albums ===
- Queen of The South (2017)
- Bloodline (2020)

=== EPs ===
- Mambokadzi (2018)

The Capsule (2024)

== Awards and nominations ==
| Year | Award ceremony | Award description | Recipient | Result |
|---|---|---|---|---|
| 2019 | 2019 Changamire Hip Hop Awards | Best Female | "Herself" | Won |
| 2019 | 2019 Changamire Hip Hop Awards | Best Dressed | "Herself" | Won |
| 2017 | 2017 Zimhiphop Awards | Best Female | "Herself" | Won |
| 2017 | 2017 Zimhiphop Awards | People's Choice | "Herself" | Won |

== See also ==
- List of Zimbabwean musicians
