= Derek Hudson =

English-born Zimbabwean conductor (1934–2005)

- Born: 23 May 1934; Hove, East Sussex, England, United Kingdom
- Died: 20 December 2005 (aged 71); Johannesburg, Gauteng, South Africa
- Occupations: Conductor; composer
- Years active: 1960s–2001
- Spouse: Jill Hudson
- Children: 2

Derek Hudson (23 May 1934 – 20 December 2005) was an English-born Zimbabwean conductor. He conducted ballets and orchestras in over a dozen countries, before moving to Rhodesia in 1977 to conduct the Bulawayo Philharmonic Orchestra in Bulawayo, where he remained for over 20 years. In 1976, he became Director of the Zimbabwe Academy of Music, and in 1977 he founded the National Symphony Orchestra. He retired in 2001 and two years later moved to Johannesburg, South Africa, where he died in 2005.

== Early life and education ==
Hudson was born on 23 May 1934 in Hove, East Sussex, England, United Kingdom. He was educated at Tonbridge School in Tonbridge, Kent. He spent four years as a pilot in the Royal Air Force, before winning a scholarship to attend the Guildhall School of Music and Drama in London, where he studied piano, composition, and conducting. He later studied with the conductor Ernest Ansermet in Geneva, Switzerland.

== Conducting career ==
Hudson made his debut with the English Chamber Orchestra at Wigmore Hall in London. In addition to a number of concerts at that orchestra, he also conducted for the London Philharmonic Orchestra and the Royal Philharmonic Orchestra at the Royal Festival Hall. He also worked with Laurence Olivier at the Royal National Theatre. He worked with ballet companies as well, including The Royal Ballet at Covent Garden, London, and the Paul Taylor Dance Company in New York City, United States. Besides the United States and the United Kingdom, he conducted orchestras in over a dozen countries over the course of his career, including France, Austria, the Netherlands, Germany, Russia, Bulgaria, the Czech Republic, Canada, and South Africa.

Hudson left England for Cape Town, South Africa, mostly for health reasons. There, he conducted the Cape Town Philharmonic Orchestra in the late 1960s and early 1970s. He came to Bulawayo, Rhodesia, in 1973 to work as a visiting conductor for the Bulawayo Philharmonic Orchestra. He was appointed to the position full-time in 1974. During his tenure, the orchestra expanded its reach, touring cities like Gwelo, Fort Victoria, Salisbury, and Wankie. In 1976, he became Director of the Zimbabwe Academy of Music. He played a large role in the founding in 1977 of the National Symphony Orchestra.

In 1980, he appeared with National Symphony Orchestra (and a marimba band) at Zimbabwe's independence celebrations, performing his own composition Prelude: Zimbabwe, as well as Ludwig van Beethoven's Ninth and Tenth symphonies, Edward Elgar's Enigma Variations, and Benjamin Britten's Noye's Fludde. Hudson conducted, but also performed as a soloist and accompanist. Being able to perform Beethoven's Ninth Symphony was no easy feat for Hudson and the orchestra, as the tune was used in Rise, O Voices of Rhodesia, the national anthem of the white-ruled Rhodesia. Only after prolonged negotiations with the government was he able to gain permission to perform it, for the first time in independent Zimbabwe's history.

Hudson had a strong influence on musical life in Bulawayo, and was prominent in Zimbabwe as a conductor, lecturer, writer, and broadcaster, even serving for seven years as a member of the board of governors of the Zimbabwe Broadcasting Corporation. In 1983, he oversaw the completion of a small concert hall at the Zimbabwe Academy of Music in Bulawayo. In 1997, he initiated the first Bulawayo Music Festival, in which around 150 attendees took a steam train to Victoria Falls, where they witnessed English violinist Tasmin Little perform.

After suffering a heart attack in 2001, he retired from public life. After his wife's death in 2003 and due to his own failing health, he left Zimbabwe and moved to Johannesburg, South Africa, to live with his daughter. There, he died in his sleep on 20 December 2005, after contracting pneumonia. In his memory, a new audio-visual centre was set up at the Zimbabwe Academy of Music, which was lacking modern equipment. The new centre, along with a bust of Hudson, by local sculptor Gilliam Kaufman, were inaugurated in October 2007 at the Bulawayo Music Festival.

== Personal life ==
Hudson was married for almost 40 years to his wife Jill, a cellist and music teacher. They had two daughters, Joanna and Kate, and seven grandchildren.

== See also ==
- List of people from Brighton and Hove
- List of Zimbabwean musicians
