= Daniel Lasker (actor) =

Zimbabwean filmmaker and actor

- Lasker at GalaxyCon San Jose in 2026
- Born: March 2, 1999 (age 27); Zimbabwe
- Occupations: Actor, filmmaker
- Years active: 2016–present

Daniel McGregor Lasker (born 1998 or 1999) is a Zimbabwean filmmaker and actor. He is best known to international audiences for his roles in the HBO series Raised by Wolves (2020–2022) and the second season of the Netflix series One Piece (2026).

== Early life and education ==
Lasker was born in 1998 or 1999 and raised in Bulawayo, Zimbabwe. He attended Whitestone Primary School and then Petra High School.

His photography and filmmaking skills are self-taught.

== Career ==
At age 17 in 2016, Lasker directed his first short film The Way It Is, working alongside indie filmmaker Nigel Ndlovu. He garnered local attention for his impression of The Joker, which he uploaded to YouTube.

Lasker played the recurring character of Furfur in both seasons of the HBO science fiction series Raised by Wolves, which was filmed in South Africa, appearing in ten episodes of the series from 2020 to 2022. Also in 2020, he appeared in episodes of the BBC One military drama Our Girl and the Syfy series Vagrant Queen as a teen version of Paul du Toit's character Commander Lazaro.

In 2022, Lasker premiered his science fiction short film The Signal at the Zimbabwe Academy of Music, starring Natasha Dlamini, Tawanda Denga, and Dumie Manyathela. After initially planning for the project to be in English, Lasker decided while Oscar K. Reyes was writing the script that it would work better in Ndebele. The Signal is considered to be the first Zimbabwean film and first Ndebele-language film of its genre. It received accolades at the Zimbabwe International Film Festival, 9th FilmQuest in Utah, and Brooklyn SciFi Film Festival. Lasker also portrayed Robert Lincoln in the History Channel miniseries Abraham Lincoln and played Merrick Aldrich in the second season of the BBC One series Noughts + Crosses.

Lasker then directed his debut feature film Hidden Within, filmed in Bulawayo, appearing in the thriller as Cullen Landon alongside Eddie Sandifolo, Anja Taljaard, Lionel Strasky and Arthur Falko. The film premiered in October 2023. In 2025, he appeared in the film London Calling and starred as the sprite Ariel in a production of Shakespeare's The Tempest at the Maynardville Open-Air Theatre in Cape Town. Lasker was cast as Mr. 9 in the second season of the Netflix live-action adaptation of the anime One Piece.

== Influences ==
Lasker has cited the likes of Peter Jackson, Martin Scorsese, and Bong Joon-ho as his filmmaking inspirations.

== Recognition ==
Lasker was part of the Zimbabwe team at the 2017 World Championships of Performing Arts.

== Filmography ==
=== Filmmaking ===
Year	Title	Director	Writer	Producer	Cinematographer	Editor	Notes
2016	The Way It Is	Yes	Yes	Yes	Yes	Yes	Short film
2017	The Walk	Yes	Yes	Yes	Yes	Yes	Short film
2018	Red Maraiah	Yes					Short film
2019	The Man	Yes					Short film
2022	The Signal	Yes		Yes	Yes	Yes	Short film; Ndebele language
2023	Hidden Within	Yes	Yes	Yes	Yes	Yes	Feature

=== Acting ===
==== Film ====
Year	Title	Role	Notes
2018	Red Maraiah	Axel	Short film
2018	Boy on Dreams	Walter	Short film
2019	The Unexpectables	Dan	Short film
2021	G.O.A.T	Travis	Short film
2023	Hidden Within	Cullen Landon	
2025	London Calling	Barnabus	
TBA	The Telling Room †	Magician	

==== Television ====
Year	Title	Role	Notes
2018	What Lies Beneath	Little Josh	Episode: "Blood Creek"
2019	American Monster	Madison Holton	2 episodes
2020	Our Girl	US Soldier	1 episode
2020	Vagrant Queen	Teen Lazaro	2 episodes
2020–2022	Raised by Wolves	Furfur	10 episodes
2021	Around the World in 80 Days	Steward	1 episode
2022	Abraham Lincoln	Robert Lincoln	Episode: "Saving the Union"
2022	Noughts + Crosses	Merrick Aldrich	Series 2
2026	One Piece	Mr. 9	Season 2; 2 episodes

== Stage ==
Year	Title	Role	Notes
2025	The Tempest	Ariel	Maynardville Open-Air Theatre, Cape Town

== Audio ==
Year	Title	Role	Notes
2022	The Girl Who Chased Otters	Nathan	Novel by Sally Partridge
