= Mashasha =

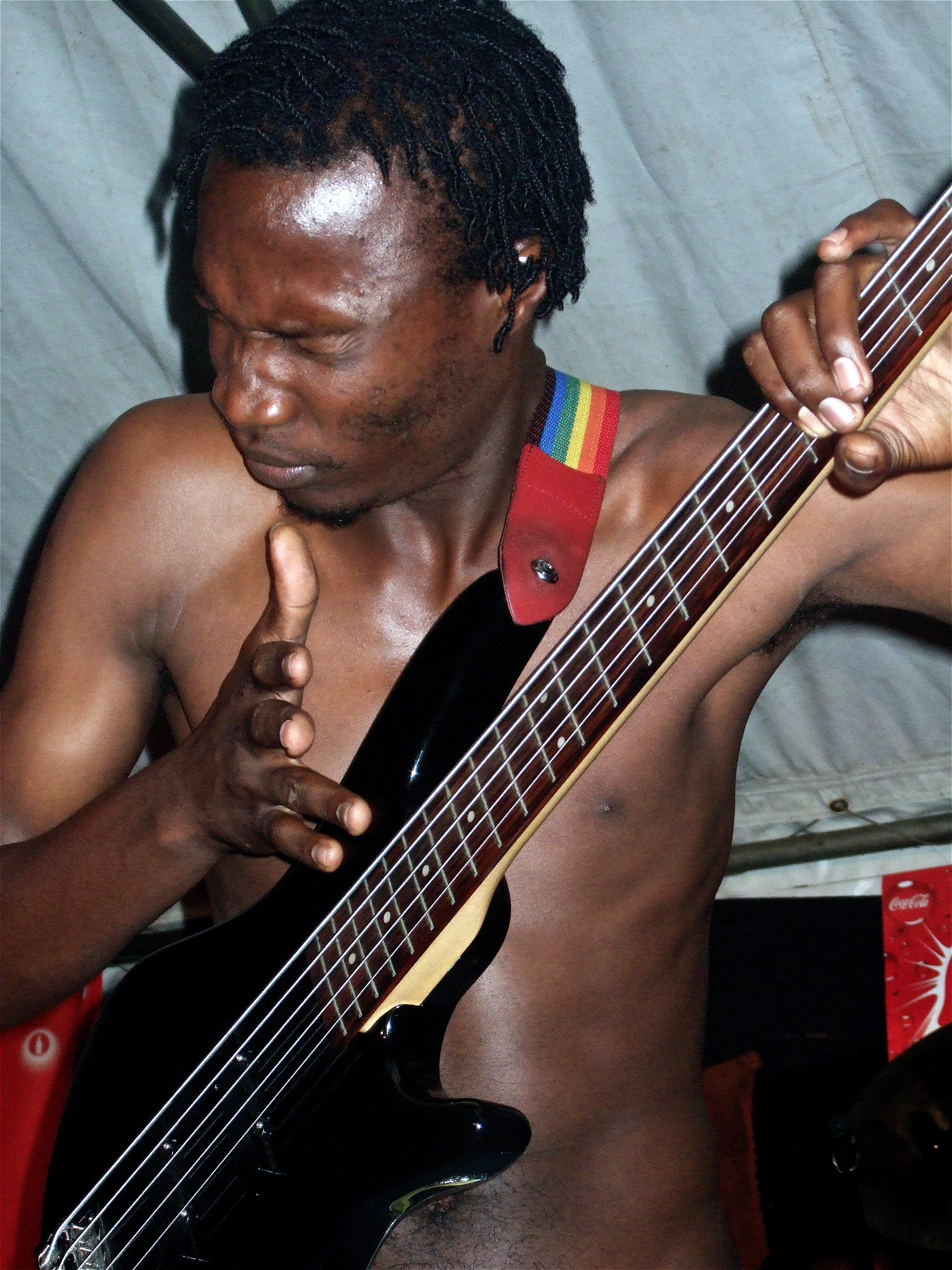
- Mashasha performing in Zimbabwe in 2006

Background information
- Born: Peter Mujuru; 15 October 1982 (age 44); Harare, Zimbabwe
- Origin: Zimbabwe
- Genres: African, jazz, world
- Occupations: Musician, singer, songwriter, music producer
- Instruments: Bass guitar, guitar, vocals, percussion
- Years active: 1998–present
- Label: Elegwa
- Website: mashasha.com

Peter Mujuru (born 15 October 1982), known by his mononym Mashasha, is a Zimbabwean musician, bass guitarist, singer, songwriter and producer based in the UK. He is widely regarded as an original and important new voice in African music. His debut studio album, Mashasha, was released by Elegwa Music in 2011; it was acclaimed by critics internationally and won a Zimbabwe Music and Arts (ZIMAA) award for Best Album.

== Early life ==
Peter Mujuru was born on 15 October 1982 in Harare, Zimbabwe, to Stellah and Lovert Mujuru. As a child, he was nicknamed "Mashasha", which in Shona means "someone with skills of a champion". His earliest exposure to music was from his father, who was an avid record collector and attending the nearby Highfield Presbyterian Church where his mother is an elder.

As a child, Mashasha frequently visited the home of neighbor and family friend Oliver Mtukudzi, one of Zimbabwe's most popular and influential singers, where Mashasha began teaching himself to play the bass guitar. He formed an amateur band with Mtukudzi's nephew, Tapiwa "Oliver Jr" Mtukudzi, who played guitar. The band made its professional debut in 1999, as "Oliver Jr and Friends", opening for Mtukudzi and his band.

== Career ==
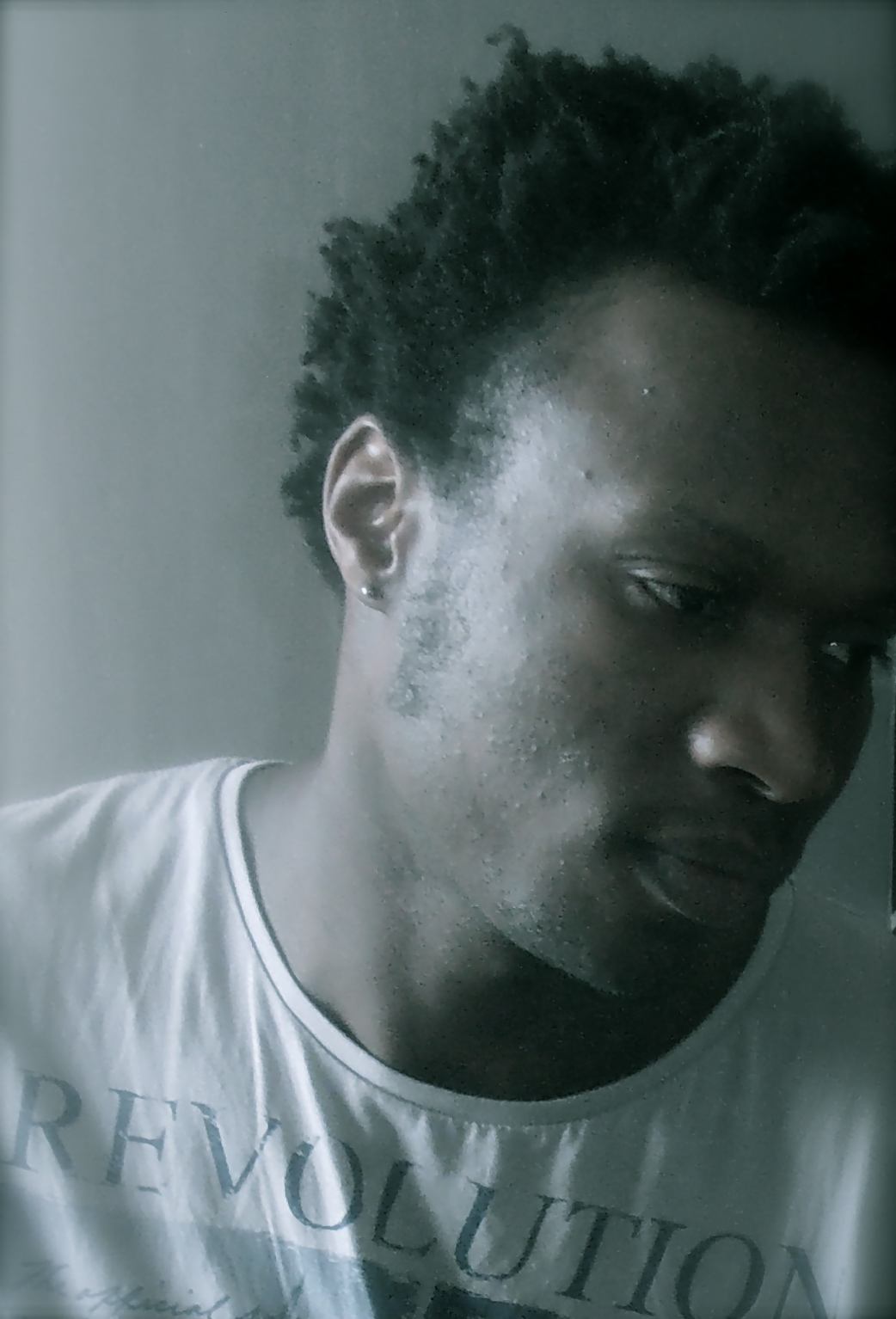
Portrait of Mashasha 2013 – Elegwa Arts

Mashasha's musicianship and skill as a bass player was quickly noted, and in 2000 he joined the band Sisonke, led by veteran singer Jonah Mutuma, best known for his work with the band The Pied Pipers, playing original Afro-jazz material and covers. Mashasha worked with this band until Mutuma's death in 2002, by which time he was recognized as a prodigious talent on the local music scene. In 2002, he co-produced and arranged the debut album "Nyarara" by Malethar (Tafadzwa Mteswa), and became in-demand as a studio and live session bass guitarist, working with Zimbabwean artists Chiwoniso Maraire, Edwin Hamma, Rute Mbangwa, Charles Summerfield, Comrade Fatso and others.

In 2003 Mashasha joined the band Too Open, led by guitarist-singer Brian Nhanhanga, playing mostly covers and some original material composed by Nhanhanga. The musicians found their original material made the biggest impact at live performances. Mashasha, Nhanhanga and drummer Sam Chagumachinyi preferred to concentrate on original material but the remaining five band members were apprehensive about the financial risk involved, believing a covers band was more employable and viable. In 2004, Mashasha, Nhanhanga and Chagumachinyi reduced the band to a trio, and from then onwards played exclusively original material, with all three as co-leaders. The subsequent album, Zororo, achieved widespread recognition and extensive airplay, especially the track "Matinda Hostel".

In 2004, Mashasha joined one of Zimbabwe's most popular bands, Andy Brown and the Storm, recording on the album "Chiedza" and touring around Zimbabwe and internationally. At the same time, Mashasha played regularly with township jazz trombone player Tanga Wekwa Sando.

Mashasha continued working with Too Open, and by 2005 the band had built a cult following among jazz audiences in Harare for their spontaneous, unpredictable, high energy live performances and the improvisation, musical creativity, and high level of musicianship of all three members. Working with Too Open, Mashasha had his first opportunity to perform his own original songs and make his debut as a vocalist. The same year, Mashasha joined the Zimbabwean rock band Bush Guru, which toured in Zimbabwe and the UK between 2006 and 2008. In late 2005, Mashasha was invited to participate in the all-star collaboration project "Hupenyu Kumusha" (Life at Home), commonly known as "The Collaboration". The project included artists from diverse musical backgrounds, including contemporary mbira player and singer-songwriter Chiwoniso Maraire, star vocalist Busi Ncube, mbira player-cum-percussionist Adam Chisvo, guitarist Roger Mbambo, and classically trained piano player Bengt Post. The album "Hupenyu Kumusha" was released in 2006, and featured two songs by Mashasha: "Spirit" and "Africa, Why War?" The songs made an impact upon their release, resulting in increased media interest in Mashasha and several interviews in the Zimbabwean press and on television. Also in 2005, Mashasha began developing and teaching bass and music workshops for high school students. He featured in two television documentaries by film-maker and music producer Eugene Ulman about the Harare performance venue The Book Café: "The Book Café Turns 10" (BBC, 2007) and "Six Nights a Week at the Book Café" (Al Jazeera, 2008)

Since 2008, Mashasha has been based permanently in the UK. There he performs as a solo artist and in other lineups. He plays in the bass and drums duo "Mashasha & Sam", which features now UK-based drummer Sam Chagumachinyi from Too Open – which is now also based in the UK. Mashasha's UK performances have included Rise Festival, The Ritzy, Luton Arts Carnival, South Bank Centre, 02 Stadium opening for Oliver Mtukudzi, Zimfest UK, OneTaste Festival, and The Poetry Café.

== Solo album ==
In 2011 Mashasha completed his debut album as a solo artist. Eponymously titled Mashasha, it was produced by Mashasha and Eugene Ulman. Mashasha and Ulman formed a production company Elegwa Arts and independent record label Elegwa Music to produce and release their work; "Mashasha" was the first project. The album comprises ten tracks, all of which are original compositions with music and lyrics by Mashasha. The tracks feature an international band that included Australian drummer-percussionist Robbie Avenaim, US jazz trombonist Ku-umba Frank Lacy, piano and keyboard player Danny G. Felix (who also arranged some of the tracks with Mashasha), Senegalese guitarist Jeannot Mendy of Viviane Ndour's Jolof Band, Iranian ney master Davod Varzideh, Sam Chagumachinyi and others.

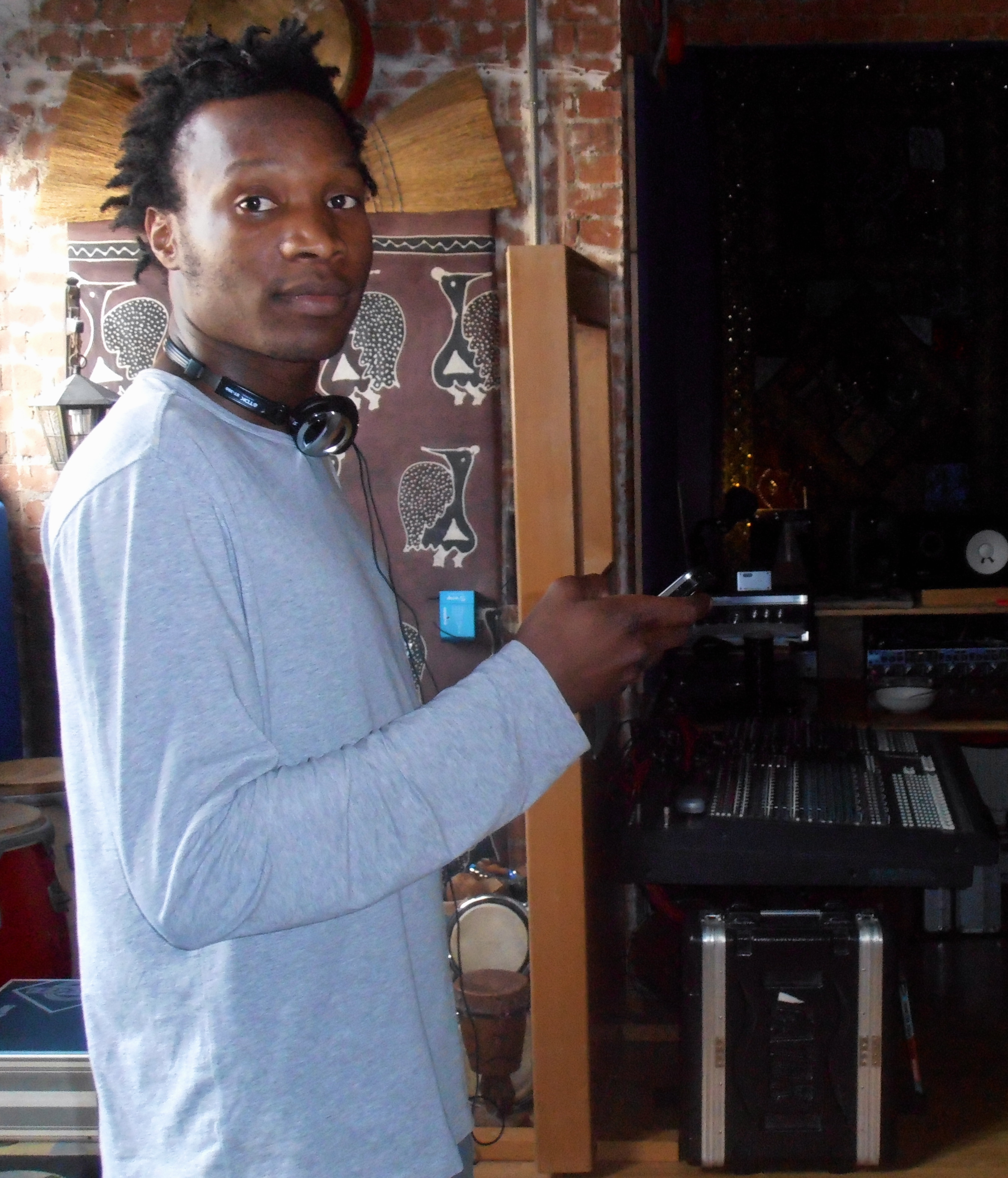
Mashasha at work in London studio

The album received high praise from leading critics and publications in numerous countries. Martin Sinnock in Songlines magazine described it as "exceptional" and "a refreshing and sparkling debut", awarding it four stars. ABC radio presenter Doug Spencer devoted an episode of the programme "Weekend Planet" to the release, and called it the "standout African debut" of the year. The Zimbabwean "Sunday Mail" described Mashasha "a new voice in African music". Hello Harare magazine described the album as "complex, intense and unique, with each song layered with musical genius". Michael Rofe in "The Australian" called it "a revelation from a major talent". Other critics have compared Mashasha to artists Richard Bona, Rokia Traore, Youssou N'Dour, Habib Koite and Oliver Mtukudzi.

In 2012, Mashasha released the single "Musuki" on Elegwa Music.

== Genre and musical style ==
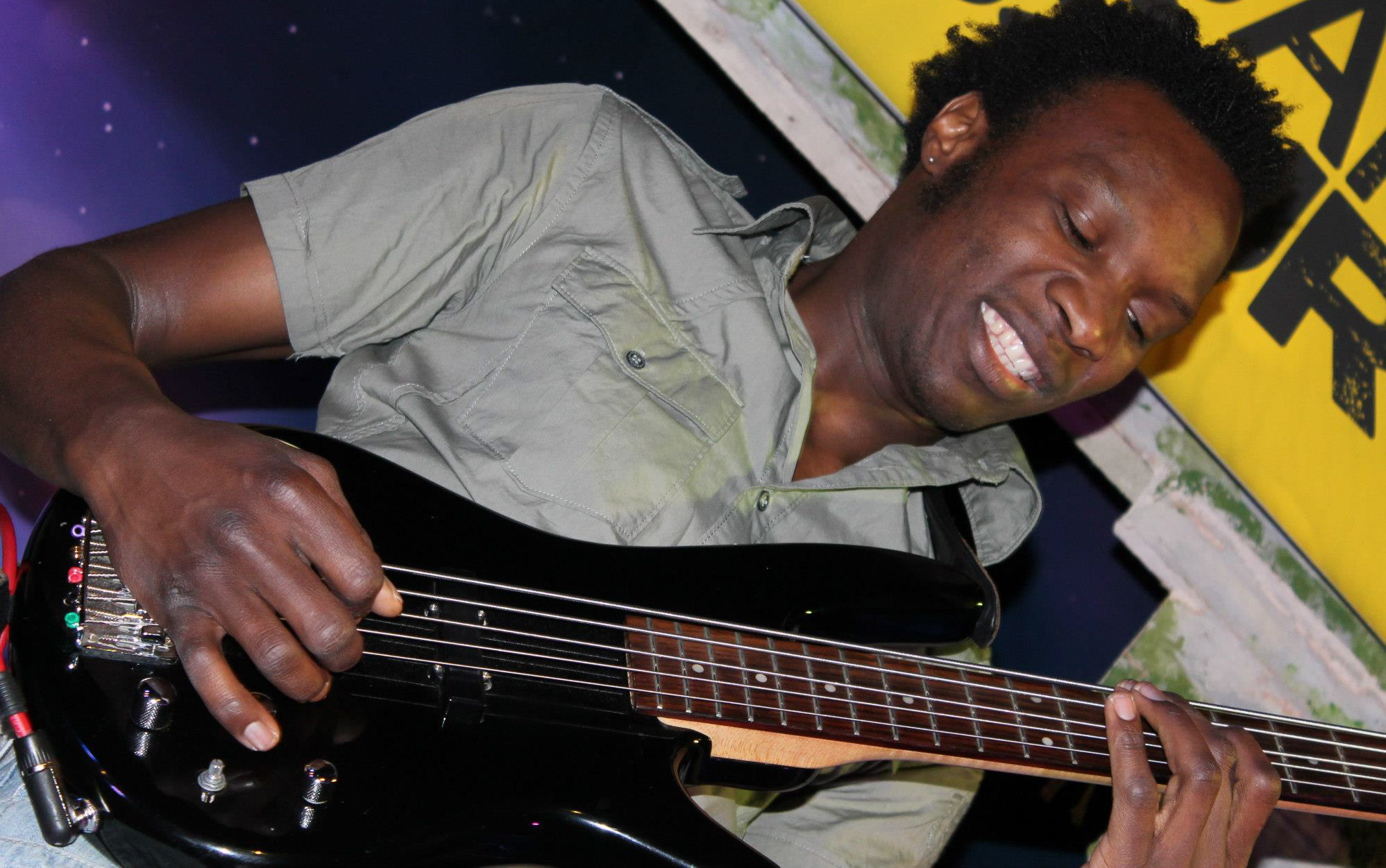
Mashasha on stage, London 2013 (photo by Kevin Igoe)

Mashasha's bass playing has been noted for its combination of virtuoso technique, assertive playing and melodic imagination. He has developed an intricate style of playing, which is rooted in traditional Zimbabwean Shona percussion, with a strong influences of blues scales and jazz improvisation techniques. His bass playing style ranges from forceful with a strong sense of urgency, to melancholic and meditative, with noticeable influences from bass players Victor Wooten, Jaco Pastorius, Marcus Miller, Wilbur Ware, Gary Peacock, Étienne M'Bappé, Dave Holland and others.

Some of Mashasha's songwriting is based on reinterpreting Zimbabwean popular music styles with his own individual variations, with other influences including West African Afrobeat, East African pentatonic music and traditional music from Iran and the Middle-East. His compositions often feature complex time signatures and harmonies, with multi-layered arrangements and rich instrumentation complimenting dense, polyrhythmic bass and drum lines.

Mashasha has a wide vocal range, and is known for his compelling stage presence and charismatic, albeit laconic, performance style.

== Awards ==
Mashasha was a winner of the Morley Studio Recording Prize in 2011. The album "Mashasha" won the Zimbabwe Music and Arts (ZIMAA) Award for Best Album in 2011.
