= Mudiwa Hood =

Zimbabwean rapper and songwriter (born 1985)

- Born: Ian Mtandwa; 24 July 1985 (age 41); Chitungwiza
- Origin: Harare, Zimbabwe
- Genres: Zimbabwean hip hop; gospel
- Occupations: Rapper; singer; songwriter; actor
- Years active: 2012–present
- Label: HoodNation Records

Mudiwa Hood is a Zimbabwean rapper, singer, and actor.

== Early life and education ==
Hood was born Ian Mtandwa in 1985 in Harare and grew up in Chitungwiza, attending Nyazura High School. He later earned a Bachelor of Science degrees in Economics and Psychology, as well as a Masters in Business Administration (Finance) from Africa University.

He began his recording career using the name "Hood" which came from his biological great-grandfather. In 2019, Hood announced he was legally changing his surname to Hood because the Mtandwa surname came from his grandfather's step-father after his great-grandfather Hood abandoned the family.

In 2012, Hood began recording his first songs at CraigBone Studios in Chitungwiza, releasing the singles "Chaputika Zvinestaira", "Anhu Acho Tisu", and "Ndaita Mari". In 2013, Hood signed a record deal with Demon Proof Records but left the label in 2015, launching HoodNation Records a year later.

"Ndaita Mari" (the Shona language title translates to English as "I Made Money") topped Zimbabwean music charts for several weeks and won four awards within a year of its release. In 2015, Steward Bank name Hood as a brand ambassador, using "Ndaita Mari" in its commercials, as well as brand ambassador for Ster-Kinekor Zimbabwe.

Hood's follow-up releases "Number 1" and "Mwana waMambo" were on the Star FM Zimbabwe Gospel Greats top-20 chart for several weeks with "Number 1" being on the chart from September 2013 to May 2014. The 2014 single "Love yaSolo" landed on the Power FM Zimbabwe top-10 chart, as did the 2015 release "Shinga," featuring Nox.

In 2017, Hood was cast in the ZBC TV drama series Muzita Rababa, which was named best Zimbabwe television series at the 2020 National Arts Merit Awards. In the series, he portrays a church choir leader. June 2021, Mudiwa Hood started a reality television programme, UnderTheHood, for ZBC TV.

In 2020, Hood authored and launched a book titled Shut Up and Make Money.

== Discography ==
=== Albums ===
- Magnet (2012)
- Mwana waMambo (2015)
- The Street Preacher (2017)

== Awards ==
Year	Ceremony	Award	Result
2012	Zim Hip Hop Awards	Best Gospel Act	Won
2013	Zim Hip Hop Awards	Best Gospel Act, Best Video 10 Over 10, People's Choice	Won
2013	Zimbabwe Achievers Awards	Best Gospel Artist, People's Choice	Nominated
2014	Zim Hip Hop Awards	Best Gospel Act	Won
2014	Gospel Hip Hop Awards	Best Video, People's Choice	Nominated
2015	Zim Hip Hop Awards	Best Album Mwana waMambo	Nominated
2015	PERMICAN Awards	Best Urban Contemporary	Nominated
2017	Zim Hip Hop Awards	Best Hustle, Best Video Slayin, Best Gospel Act	Won
2017	Megafest Business Awards	Business Personality of the Year	Won
2018	Zim Hip Hop Awards	Hip Hop Personality of the Year	Won
2019	Zim Hip Hop Awards	The Highest Achievement in Hip Hop, People's Choice	Won
2021	Zim Community News Awards	Best Hip Hop Artist of the decade	Won
2021	BEFFTA Awards	Man Of The Year 2020/21	Nominated

== Personal life ==
Hood was married to Angelica Colchèita-Hood. They divorced in 2020. They have one child.
