= Angu Mashoko =

Studio album by Ngonidzashe Kambarami
- Released: 20 October 2004
- Genres: Afro pop, Ragga, R&B, Urban Grooves, Afro jazz
- Length: 59:34
- Labels: Highway Entertainment; CD-TP-NK2/2
- Producers: Gordon Mutekedzi; Sipho Mkhuhlane; Lyton Ngolomi

Ngonidzashe Kambarami chronology
Ndinoimba (2002)	Angu Mashoko (2004)	idenderedzwa (2007)

Professional ratings
Review scores
Source	Rating
Daily Mirror	(Not rated)

Angu Mashoko is Ngonie's second studio album. Released and launched on 20 October (a day after Ngonie turned 21) at Cheers Night Club in Mabvuku, it is a 13-track album with 12 original tracks and one radio mix. Ngonie funded the whole production of this album on his own and released it on his own label 4RoomsOfLove, Highway Entertainment.

== Track listing ==
1. Shamwari (5.00) features Alexio Kawara
2. Angela (5.39)
3. Tsika (5.02)
4. Nherera (4.44) features Diana Samkwange
5. Dekadzo (4.11)
6. Rudo neChido (5.04)
7. Mazakwatira (3.49) with Leonard Mapuranga
8. Pedyo Newe (6.02)
9. Kuswera Newe (4.28)
10. Jabulani (3.44) featuring Carmelita
11. Shoko (4.38)
12. Kundivenga (3.43)
13. Zunza (Radio edit of Mazakwatira) (3.30)

== Chart performance ==
Shamwari and Angela achieved the PowerFM top 100 status for the year 2006

== Album sales ==
Record Labels and/or music distribution companies in Zimbabwe do not release details of the sales of their artistes and so it is difficult to tell the extent to which the album was sold. However, the Zimbabwean Herald newspaper publishes a weekly poll of the sales performance for each of the main music companies in that country. According to some of these reports, sales of this album were quite good for a number of weeks at least.

== Music videos ==
A video was produced for the track "Angela". The video aired on the local ZTV station and was also distributed to most banking halls where it was also played.

== Other sources ==
- Angu Mashoko CD - CD-TP-NK2/2 (p) 2004 @ Metro
