= Highfield East =

Constituency of the Parliament of Zimbabwe

- Former National Assembly constituency for the Parliament of Zimbabwe
- Highfield East is 27 on this map of Zimbabwe
- Province: Harare
- Region: Harare
- Major settlements: Highfield, Harare

Former constituency
- Created: 2008
- Abolished: 2023
- Replaced by: Highfield

Highfield East was a constituency represented in the National Assembly of the Parliament of Zimbabwe. The seat was dissolved for the 2023 Zimbabwean general election into the Highfield constituency.

== Members ==
Election	Parliament	Name	Party	Ref.
2018	9th Parliament of Zimbabwe	Erick Murai	MDC Alliance	

== See also ==
- List of Zimbabwean parliamentary constituencies
