= King98 =

Zimbabwean Musical artist (born 1998)

- Born: January 15, 1998 (age 28); Marondera, Zimbabwe
- Origin: Zimbabwean
- Genres: Hip hop; world
- Occupations: Rapper, songwriter
- Years active: 2017–present
- Label: Cinq Music

Ngonidzashe Dondo (born January 15, 1998), better known as King98, is a Zimbabwean Hip Hop artist based in South Africa.

== Biography ==
King98 was born in Marondera.

King98 started his music career in 2017 when he was still in High School, he released his first single titled SauceMan that year. In 2019, he launched his first album titled Francesca which featured Davido, Nasty C and Nadia Nakai.

== Discography ==
=== Singles ===
- SauceMan 2017
- Defeat 2018
- I Bet 2020
- Kachiri ft Diamond Platnumz 2020
- Jogodo ft Jux and Sheby Medicine 2020

=== Albums ===
- Fransesca

== Awards ==
- Best Hip Hop Hustle – Zim Hip Hop Awards 2019
- Best Album – Zim Hip Hop Awards 2019
- Best Collaboration – Zim Hip Hop Awards 2019
- Best Collaboration – Zim Hip Hop Awards 2019
- Best Newcomer – Changamire Festival Awards 2020
- Best Video of the Year (Wacko ft Davido) - Changamire Festival Awards 2020
- Best Coordinated Event (Francesca Album Release) – Changamire Festival Awards 2020
- Best Album of the Year – StarFM Music Awards 2020
- Best Rising Star – Glamma Awards 2020
