= Ndinoimba =

Studio album by Ngonidzashe Kambarami
- Released: August 2002
- Genre: Afro pop, R&B, Urban Grooves, Afro jazz
- Length: 58:36
- Label: ThatSquad Entertainment; CD-TP-NK2/2
- Producer: Tatenda Jenami; Sipho Mkhuhlane

Ngonidzashe Kambarami chronology
Ndinoimba (2002)	Angu Mashoko (2004)

Professional ratings
Review scores
Source	Rating
Daily Mirror	not rated

Ndinoimba is Ngonie's first studio album. Released in 2002, it was recorded at ThatSquad Studios by Tatenda "Take 5" Jenami and Sipho "TBA" Mkuhlane (who now calls himself "PlayBoy". The album has 10 "original" tracks, 1 remix track and a 1'13" interlude.

== Track listing ==
1. Bvuma (4.18)
2. Ndapererwa (4.43) features Raps' Finest
3. Ndiwe Chete (5.01)
4. Donna (4.22)
5. Tell Me Why (3.45) features Kevin from Trinity as Rastah Kev
6. Ndinochema (4.56)
7. C'mon now (1.13) an interlude
8. Wakaenda (5.14)
9. Tamba (5.10)
10. Happy Birthday (3.42) featuring Gumiso
11. Wabata moyo wangu (4.27) written by Janet
12. Ndinotenda (4.45)
13. Wakaenda (5.07) - Stardust Mixx

== Chart performance ==
Wakaenda spent over six weeks on the then 3FM top 20 charts and then culminated the year at number 2 on the top 100 charts for the year 2002 which was broadcast on 3FM on 2 January 2003. Ndiwe Chete, Bvuma and Happy Birthday were also in the top 100 chart on that same day.

== Album sales ==
Record Labels and/or music distribution companies in Zimbabwe do not release details of the sales of their artistes and so it is difficult to tell the extent to which the album was sold. However, the Zimbabwean Herald Newspaper publishes a weekly poll of the sales performance for each of the main music companies in that country. According to some of these reports, sales of this album were quite good for a number of weeks at least.

== Music videos ==
Only one video was produced for the track Bvuma. The video briefly changes into the song Ndiwe Chete before returning to its title track.
