= Yung Tyran =

South African rapper

- Born: Thamsanqa Silanda; Bulawayo, Zimbabwe
- Origin: Zimbabwe
- Genres: Hip Hop
- Occupations: Rapper; singer; songwriter; record producer
- Instrument: Vocals
- Years active: 2014–present

Thamsanqa Silanda, professionally known as Yung Tyran, is a Zimbabwean-Born South African rapper, singer, songwriter, record producer. He first gained recognition after one of his singles titled "Brenda Fassie" topped the YFM music charts in 2015.

== Early life ==
Yung Tyran was born in Bulawayo, Zimbabwe. He left Bulawayo in 2014 to seek greener pastures in South Africa and has since been collaborating with South African musicians.

== Career ==
He first gained recognition after one of his singles titled "Brenda Fassie" topped the YFM music charts in 2015. The single won Best collaboration at the Skyz Metro FM Awards in 2017. His debut album, The Inevitable was released in April 2014. The album was recorded at First Class, which was a local music studio.

In August 2018, he released the single "Snakes" which featured local musicians J Flo and SkyCityUno. In September 2018, he performed on the SABC 1 music show, Live Amp alongside South African musicians AKA and Boity. He was on the stage after he was voted the winner of the programme's first bubbling under competition. Later that year, he won Best Diaspora at the 2018 Zim Hip Hop Awards.

In 2019, he released his debut EP, Late Bloomers. The 11 track EP features South African musicians Priddy Ugly, 2 Yung, Frya, Darse Mayne, Benny Afroe & J Flo.

In 2020, he released his sophomore EP, Zodiac which featured South African musicians Lordnelle, KLY and Flvme. The EP quickly gained recognition as "The internet's best-kept secret.

In 2021, he released the album, Memento Mori. The album features three guest appearances such as Zimbabwean musician SkyCityUno, vocalist Thando, and Skhanda World’s Loki.

In September 2022, he released his fourth studio project titled, Look What It's Come To.

== Discography ==
- The Inevitable (2014)
- Zodiac (2020)
- Memento Mori (2021)
- Look What It's Come To (2022)

== Awards and nominations ==
Year	Award ceremony	Prize	Result
2017	Skyz Metro FM Awards	Best Collaborated song	Won
2018	Zim Hip Hop Awards	Best Diaspora	Won
