= Diego Tryno =

Zimbabwean Musical artist (born 1998)

- Also known as: Mr Coffee Please, The Future Billionaire
- Born: Diego Tinotenda Chikombeka; 5 February 1998 (age 28)
- Origin: Harare, Zimbabwe
- Genres: Urban Contemporary
- Occupations: Musician, recording artist, rapper
- Years active: 2014 – present
- Label: Independent (current)

Diego Tinotenda Chikombeka (born February 5, 1998), professionally known as Diego Tryno is a Zimbabwean urban contemporary and hip-hop musician. He is also known locally by stage names including "Mr. Coffee Please" and "The Future Billionaire".

== Early life ==
Diego was born in Mutare, Zimbabwe at the Sakubva District Hospital. He was the first child born to his mother Fungisai Kanjera and his father Christopher Chikombeka. While attending primary school, he moved to Zvishavane temporarily and moved back to Mutare to finish his primary education. He attended Chikanga High School before moving to Harare, and finished high school at Living Waters High School. During his schooling, Tryno practiced music privately, as his parents were not tolerant of his decision to pursue music.

== Music career ==
He once did Zimdancehallmusic under the name Ricky D before switching to hip-hop. Tryno recorded his first hip-hop track in 2014 called "Go Diego Go" and won his first regional award at Zambezi Music Awards the same year. In 2015 he did his first live show at Summer Jam followed by "I wanna see you" dance tour. He does music in English, Shona, and Ndebele and his first Shona track was in 2015 when he featured in a song with singer TC. Tryno has worked with regional and international producers in the production of his music. One notable producer was Dry AFM from Botswana who contributed to the mixing of his song Yolo.

=== 2018 ===
In October 2018, Tryno released his debut album Lazarus (Age Volume 1) which was the first contribution of his All Generations Entwined project. The album was released in collaboration with Zimbabwean Hip-hop artist Ti Gonzi's album "Best Mero" on the same day and venue and the debut was mistakenly believed to be a Gospel Album. Tryno's debut album was considerably circulated on radio stations including Star Fm, ZiFm, Hevoi Fm in Masvingo and SA's Metro Fm. After his first album, Tryno attempted to mix urban contemporary, sungura, gospel, and Zimbabwean traditional music. October 30, 2018, Diego released his debut video "Mabvuta" live on ZiFm Stereo and Zimbabwe's ZBC TV.

=== 2019 ===
In 2019 Tryno released his single Cooler Box which made its way to Zimbabwean radio charts and he promised to release his sophomore album Stories (Age Vol 2) which he failed to release on the promised date and it attracted negative feedback from his fans. Zim hip-hop artist Diego Tryno delays album release.... manager blames power cuts 2019 he dismissed rumors about a tour in Kenya and cancelled any other rumored tours.

== Nationality and identity ==
Tryno was forbidden to do music by his family and because of the ban he did music privately and he did not identify as Zimbabwean. He engaged with radio station managers in other countries for airplay and marketing. In South Africa they marketed him as South African on radios and online mediums and in Zambia they marketed him as Zambian. He came out publicly as Zimbabwean in 2018.

== Discography ==
=== Albums ===
- Lazarus (Age Volume 1) (2018)

=== Singles ===
- Lazarus
- Mabvuta
- Sungai
- Hell Naw
- Yolo
- Mama

== Videography ==
Year	Title	Director	Ref
2018	Mabvuta	Media Empire	
2019	Sungai ft Dj Monte	Denford Mkasi	

== Awards and nominations ==
Year	Ceremony	Award	Result		
2014	Zambezi Music Awards	Best Upcoming	Won		
2014	Zambezi Music Awards	2020	Glamour Awards Zimbabwe	Out Standing Newcomer	Won
	Glamour Awards Zimbabwe	2020	Glamour Awards Zimbabwe	Outstanding Album	Nominated

List of songs, with selected chart positions, showing year released and album name
Title	Year	Peak chart positions			Album
Title	Year	Star Fm top 50|Zim	Yami Fm Top 10|UK	Hevoi Fm top 50|Zim	Album
"Lazarus"	2016	—	8	—	"Single"
"Coolerbox"	2018	—	—	—	Lazarus (Age vol1)
"Mama"	2019	—	—	—	"Single"
