= Rhyme Assassin =

Zimbabwean hip-hop artist (born 1981)

Rhyme Assassin Tichaona Monera
- Born: April 3, 1981 (age 45); Harare, Zimbabwe
- Origin: Zimbabwean
- Genres: Hip hop; Rap; world
- Occupations: Rapper, songwriter
- Years active: 2012–present

Rhyme Assassin (born April 3, 1981), born Tichaona Monera, is a London-based Zimbabwean hip-hop artist who rose to prominence in Zimbabwe with his song Party People in 2014.

== Background ==
Rhyme Assassin was born in Chikomba, Chivhu and grew up in the capital city of Zimbabwe Harare's suburb Highfield and Houghton Park.

Rhyme Assassin started music in 2000 doing rap battles and performances up to 2002 when he left for the UK, he then resumed his music career in 2012 when he met a UK producer named Deep Voice who ignited his passion for music and he started writing and recording music.

The rapper rose to prominence in 2014 after the release of "Party people" a single featuring T9yce. The song was the number one on major radio stations in Zimbabwe and was on ZBC Power FM Zimbabwe charts for 12 weeks on both the daily Power FM Top 10 chart and the weekly Power FM Top 20 chart leading the track to be in top 50 of the Power FM Top 100 songs of the year 2014.

In 2014 Rhyme Assassin established Uncle Rhymes Records as his record label he now works under. In 2014, Rhyme Assassin started Mwana Anokosha concert, a charity musical event for orphans at Harare Children's Home and the event has featured several performing artist. He has also been involved with Afro Empire dance group's charity initiatives.

In 2024, Rhyme Assassin released Run em Up featuring M.O.P and Ruste Juxx. The track was produced by The Arcitype and the video was shot in Brooklyn. The track became number one on popular college radio in the US called Rap Attack College radio.

== Discography ==
=== Albums ===
- Singles Collections 2013
- Street Anthems 2014
- Kombi Edition 2014

=== Singles ===
- Party People 2014
- Beautiful feat. Alaina Pullen
- Tsiva 2015
- Tsiva remix feat Sharky, Pmdee, Jungle Kid, Mc Potar and Ti Gonzi
- Pick up my life 2018
- Rhyme Apostles 2023 feat Jadakiss, Craig G, Reks, Ruste Juxx, Antlive, K Solo, Canibus, Chino XL, Keith Murray A-F-R-O, Crooked I and Prodigal Sunn
- Run Em Up 2025 feat. M.O.P and Ruste Juxx
- Be Mighty 2025 feat. Stic.man (Dead Prez) and Wayne Gidden

== Awards and nominations ==
- 2012 - Zimbabwe Music and Arts (ZIMA) UK - Male Artist of the Year Award
- 2013 - ZIMMA UK Male Artist of the Year nominee
- 2013 - Zim Hip Hop Awards Best Diaspora nominee
- 2014 - Zim Hip Hop Awards Best Diaspora Awards winner
- 2015 – Zim Hip Hop Awards Best Diaspora winner
- Zim Hip Hop Awards - Best Diaspora Artist 2024
- Changamire Hip Hop Awards - Best Song (Run em Up) 2025
