= Patrick Gada =

Zimbabwean cricketer (born 1978)

Personal information
- Born: 5 May 1978 (age 48); Salisbury, Zimbabwe
- Source: ESPNcricinfo, 24 February 2017

Patrick Gada (born 5 May 1978) is a Zimbabwean cricketer. He made his first-class debut in the 1998/99 season.

== Biography ==
Gada cricket journey began at Chengu Primary School, advancing to Prince Edward High School on a cricketing scholarship. He performed consistently in both batting and occasional bowling roles during his school and club cricket career.

In 1999, Gada joined the Zimbabwe Cricket Academy and later had stints in England and the United States. Post-academy, he represented Manicaland in the Logan Cup, and then returned to his hometown club, Takashinga.
