= Flint Bedrock =

- Born: Edson Masunda; 27 April 1985 (age 40); Harare
- Origin: Zimbabwe
- Genres: Dance music; Pop music
- Occupations: Rapper; Singer; Songwriter; Music Producer; Music Executive
- Instrument: Vocals
- Years active: 2009–present
- Label: YSBG Records

Edson Masunda (born 27 April 1985), better known by his stage name Flint Bedrock, is a Zimbabwean singer, songwriter and music producer. Born in Seke, Harare Flint moved to London at the age of 17 before settling in Leeds in 2005 where he began his music career. He is best known for his charitable work through music including his 2015 collaboration with the Chuckle Brothers among other stars as part of The Crowd to raise money for the Bradford City stadium fire.

== Music career ==
Flint took piano lessons from the age of five. He went on to study music in school but didn't quite see it as a career path until he came across some local musicians in 2009 in Leeds. Bedrock released his debut single "Dreamer" in 2011 before re-releasing it again in 2013 under his then newly established record label and artist management company YSBG Entertainment. His debut single "Dreamer" was a success and led to a record deal offer but Flint did not sign; instead he spent the next few years perfecting his art on his own terms and developing his music business. He released his second single, "Can't Bring Me Down", accompanied by a music video in January 2017 which landed him a publishing contract with Gamma Music based in Russia. The deal would see the song distributed across Russia and the Baltic States, being played on radio and TV music channels. He also collaborated with fellow black artist and Donald Trump supporter Joy Villa on the song Freedom (fight for it) in July 2019.

== Discography ==
=== Singles ===
- "Dreamer" (2011)
- "Dreamer" (2013)
- "Can't Bring Me Down" (2016)

== Music videos ==
Year	Title	Director/s
2017	"Can't Bring Me Down"	Roderick McMillan

| 2021 ||”Going back home”|| Flint Bedrock
