= Saintfloew =

Zimbabwean hip-hop artist

- Born: Tawanda Mambo; Chitungwiza, Zimbabwe
- Genre: Hip hop
- Occupations: Rapper; Singer; Songwriter

Tawanda Mambo, known professionally as Saintfloew, is a Zimbabwean hip-hop artist and songwriter.

== Career ==
Known professionally as Saintfloew, Tawanda Mambo is a Zimbabwean hip-hop artist and songwriter.

In 2023, he released the EP Sauna Season. His album, Rise and Lead, was launched on 7 October 2023 at Alex Sports Club in Harare. In September 2024, Saintfloew signed a distribution deal with Virgin Music Group South Africa, a subsidiary of Universal Music Group.

== Personal life ==
In August 2023, Saintfloew checked into a rehabilitation facility in South Africa with the support of businessman Tinashe Mutarisi. In January 2024, Saintfloew married his long-time girlfriend, Beverly.

== Discography ==
=== EPs ===
- Sauna Season (2022)

=== Albums ===
- Rise and Lead (2023)

=== Singles ===
- "Gundamwenda"
- "Silas Mavende"
- "One by One" (featuring Julian King)
- "Mutemo weMukombi"
