= Roki (musician) =

Rockford Josphats
- Also known as: Roki, Rocqui
- Born: July 7, 1985 (age 40)
- Origin: Harare, Zimbabwe
- Genres: Urban grooves
- Occupation(s): Singer-songwriter, dancer, choreographer, actor, businessman
- Instrument: Vocals
- Years active: 2001–present
- Labels: Chamembe, Metro

Rockford Josphats (born July 7, 1985), better known by his stage names Roki or Rocqui, is a Zimbabwean contemporary musician, who has also tapped into acting. Born in Harare and raised in ParkTown Waterfalls Harare, Roki made his debut in 2001 after releasing hits such as "Seiko" which featured Leonard Mapfumo and Suzanna.

Proud holder of the "most Promising Artist for 2003" through the prestigious National Arts Merit Awards of Zimbabwe (NAMA), Roki has made a name for himself as a gifted songwriter and exceptional performer. His album which carried the undying hit "Chidzoka" won best video of the year and song of the year in 2007.

In 2012, Roki participated in the Big Brother Africa 7 show, he was tipped to win, but was disqualified after an altercation with fellow Zimbabwean house mate Maneta. Despite this, Roki rose to national and regional fame. The urban grooves star has apparently fathered at least five children with different women, he dropped out of school at about age 15. Roki's songs centre on the themes of love, death, life and the clash of Western and African culture.

In 2021, Roki collaborated with legendary Congolese soukous singer and dancer star, Koffi Olomide and Tanzanian BET award winner on a song titled Patati Patata.

== Style and influences ==
His music style includes Urban Groove, Soca, Dancehall, Afro-pop and House music. In 1996, while on a bus singing with friends, Roki was heard by a local musician who invited him to provide backing vocals on the musician's song.

Some of his songs include Chidzoka, Ndokuda Gugu, Jordan, Zion, Ndoda, Mumwe, Suzanna and Nhliziyo.
