= Charles Charamba =

Zimbabwean musician

- Born: 27 April 1971 (age 54)
- Occupations: Musician, Pastor, Songwriter, Producer
- Spouse: Olivia (née Maseko)

Charles Charamba (born 27 April 1971) is a Zimbabwean gospel musician and a former pastor in the Apostolic Faith Mission Church of Zimbabwe (AFM). He has since started his own church. Charamba's albums have been the top selling gospel music in Zimbabwe since the early 2000s. He has toured both Great Britain and the United States, and throughout southern Africa. One of Charamba's most famous songs is "Machira Chete". His wife, Olivia (née Maseko), is also a gospel singer, and appears with him on stage and on his albums; they are often called the "First Family of Gospel".Charles Charamba lives in The Suburb of Gunhill in Harare. His children are also talented in music.

== Early life and education ==
Charamba was born in Mudzi District, which is now under Mashonaland East Province. He attended Masarakufa Primary School and Masarakufa Secondary School in Mudzi, completing his O-Levels. In 1998, Charamba began his studies at the Living Waters Bible College in Tynwald, Harare, where he received his bachelor's degree in theology. Well after his rise to gospel music stardom, he returned to college and in 2011 received a "National Certificate in Music" from the Zimbabwe College of Music. In 2013, he graduated with a bachelor's degree in jazz from Africa University.

== Fraud charges ==
In August 2004, Charamba along with his banker Sebastian Mupa at the Agricultural Development Bank of Zimbabwe (Agribank) were charged with fraud in the execution of a $40 million loan, bail was eventually set at $1 million. However, after further investigation the charges were dropped.

== Music ==
Charamba's gospel music contains elements of sungura, jazz and jit. It can be laid back, or vivid with traditional beats such as mbakumba and mhande.

Originally Charamba recorded on the Gramma Label. But after gaining sufficient capital, he built his own studio and began putting his albums out under his own label "Fishers of Men".

=== Songs ===
Charamba's hit songs include:

- "Machira Chete"
- "Sarudzai",
- "Masimba Ndeenyu",
- "Kumakomo Uko",
- "Handidi Naye",
- "Tauya Kuzomutenda".
- "Buruka"
- "Nyika
- "Mhinduro Iripo"

the calling of disciples

- "Abba Father"

=== Albums ===
Charamba's albums include:

- Tinashe Akatendeka (1997)
- Johanne 3:16 (1998)
- Vhuserere (2000)
- Exodus (2001)
- Sunday Service (2002)
- Verses and Chapters (2004)
- New Testament in Song (2007)
- Pashoko Pangoma (2010)
- WeNazareta (2014)
- Abba Father (2017)
