= Zimbabwean hip-hop =

Music genre

Zimbabwean hip hop
- Stylistic origins: Hip hop
- Cultural origins: Early 1980s, Zimbabwe

Fusion genres
- Mbira Dze hip hop

Regional scenes
- Harare; Bulawayo; Mutare; Masvingo; Chitungwiza

Local scenes
- Emganwini

Other topics
- Roil Bulawayo Arts Awards

Zimbabwean hip hop is a variety of hip hop music that is popular in Zimbabwe. It emerged in the early 1990s. Prominent artists include Holy Ten, Tehn Diamond, Mlue Jay, Mahcoy, Saintfloew, TiGonzi, Takura and T3rry Tempo.

== History ==
=== 1990–2000 ===
After 10 years of independence, hip hop hit the streets of Zimbabwe. The youth of Zimbabwe embraced it. The earliest recordings were mostly on vinyl and tapes. The low income earners could not afford high quality equipment. The mainstream acts of the time were Piece of Ebony, Fortune Muparutsa [with rap verses on songs like "Rumors" (1991)], and Midnight Magic with songs like "Blackness" featuring Mau Mau. Since most vinyl records and cassette tapes are no longer playable, Zimbabwe lost much of its earlier catalog, from which later generations could have drawn inspiration.

This also limits the opportunities to sample from predecessors. During the 3rd and 4th quarter of this period, initiative and leadership influence of Innocent Tshuma (then known as the Millennium Man), saw the youths developing the genre. The lifestyle and culture began to adopt American Hip hop trends, leaning less on the stagnant local Mbira Hip hop - exported globally by groups like Zimbabwe Legit, hip hop remained universal to other genres such as Museve, Reggae, Kwaito, Jazz, Choral, Sungura, Maskandi and South African mouse music. In 2016, rappers like Takura gathered a following. Becoming one of the first to be recognized during stiff competition with Zimdancehall.

=== 2001–present ===
Since 2001 rappers and project managers have branched out to form their own brands, record labels, and radio stations. The need for the voice drove their grip on the industry and diluted their power in distribution, influence, airplay, and the ability to predict the next big rapper. Rappers began selling CDs in the streets, the value of a rapper in Zimbabwe was the same as a good laugh joke. Events witnessed projects such as Mashoko and the circle in Harare uplifting and popularizing hip hop rappers and emcees. Other rappers implemented politics into their music design and started movements such as House of Hunger.

Mashoko became a success to a once-a-month festival known as Shoko Fest, which included international acts like Akala, among others who have staged in Zimbabwe. Many Zimbabwean emcees perform at these events, ongoing since 2010. The same year, the Zim Hip Hop Awards began.

With developments to the Havard Project Manager, rappers have used online platforms to adopt digital distribution channels such as Distrokid and Amazon Music. Music videos and promotional Content are now used to secure commissions. Prolific artists are now hiring or being approached by private sector to handle their affairs in a more professional manner.

== Style and influences ==
=== Influences ===
Hip hop's use of high tech equipment kept it with each technological advancement like the Harvard Project Manager. America continues to exert influence on the genre, and many local acts use the same flow and drum kits used by their favorite American rappers and hip hop Producers.

=== Zimbabwean Identity ===
A few acts are now moving away from the influence of American hip hop, branding themselves as kings, queens and faces of the generation. Some have resorted to remakes and remixes of old hit tracks, whereas others emphasize sampling traditional or folk songs and collaborating with each other rappers and more established names from other genres. New acts have seen a wide use of traditional languages like (Shona and Ndebele), among 16 more Spoken languages in Zimbabwe and incorporate native instruments such as Mbira, Marimba, traditional drums or Hosho (shaker) which makes the new era sound named Amapiano, with leading acts like Shumayela. from the Amapiano Capital Movement in Bulawayo to celebrate local music, While RnB star Kyla Blac and Boy Nino proved that influencing, inspiring, or impressing International musicians is possible as their tracks were sampled or recognized by South African rapper Emtee, supporting the argument to establish distinct identities.

== Media ==
=== Radio ===
Radio has boosted the genre, in part by broadcasting and implementing podcasts and shows to promote local content. Radio catalogs and podcasts are now a vital source of entertainment for the generation Z who connect with the genre. Apart from airplay, some radio stations have segments dedicated to the genre.

- School of Hip Hop
- Zim Hip Hop Explosion

=== Television ===
A few shows dedicated to hip hop on Zimbabwe's local broadcaster.

- HipHop263
- Fresh hip-hop zw
- HiphopZW

=== Blogs ===
Blogs are predominantly the drivers of Zimbabwean hip hop. One of the most influential writers was the late Donald "Dodger" Marindire whose work documented the culture for the past decade, inspiring many artists.

Major platforms include:

- ZimSphere
- Nova Review
- THE263POST
- Grape Vine
- Greedy South
- EarGround
- Zim Hip Hop Circles
- Zim Hip Hop Plugs
- 3-mob.com
