= Mbira dzeNharira =

Musical troupe based in Zimbabwe

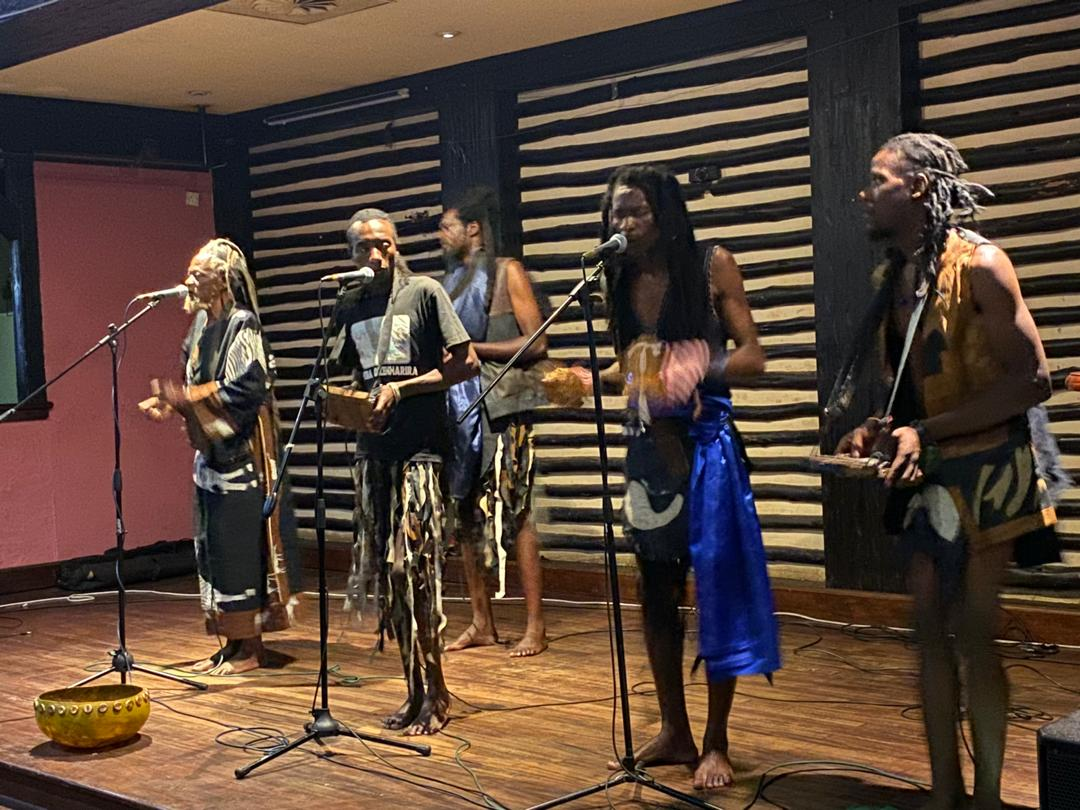
Mbira dzeNharira music group of Zimbabwe.

Mbira DzeNharira was formed by Tendayi Gahamadze in 1987 in Norton, a town 40 km west of Harare. To date they have released 11 CD and 3 DVD albums.

== Background ==
Mbira dzeNharira revolutionized the sound of mbira by electrifying and rearranging the instruments into bass baritone, rhythm and lead mbira. The ancient 22 key mbira dzavadzimu was a three octave instrument with the keys on the right standing for lead keys, on the upper left is the rhythm section, and on the bottom left is the bass section.

This made it possible for one mbira player to be able to perform solo at ceremonies and gatherings, and sometimes it could be two or three players rotating on those three octaves.

Mbira DzeNharira decided to increase the number of octave to six using four mbiras on the mbira dzavadzimu.

Complex rhythms were born and mbira music took a more vibrant and multi rhythmic style which completely changed the sound.

The current members of the group who have been together for eleven years are Tendayi Gahamadze who composes, sings and plays the baritone mbira (Dongonda), Clemmence Rice who plays the bass mbira (Nhovapasi), Takawira Devera who plays lead mbira (Nheketo) and Tendai (Netombo) Kazuru who plays shakers ( hosho). All the players of instruments except the bass man are also singers.

Mbira dzeNharira has won five musical awards.

== Style ==
As the group ages it matures more in depths of Shona music.

Ndini kudzana, nechimbo nengoma

Ndini chidyo nemadyirwo acho, ndiniwo mafaro ekupembera Ndini chipfeko nemapfekerwo acho, ndiniwo kuchema kwemarwadzo ose Ndini mumhanzi, ndini maungira, ndiniwo mutakuri wemimba Ndini nhimbe, mafuwe nemapira, ndiniwo mudzimu unoyera

Dzoka iwe nekuti ndiri upenyu, nzira yeupenyu Usina nzira hauna kwaunosvika Unenge danda rakafa rakayangarara pamusoro Richisundwa zvisina gwara, risina kwarakananga Ruchitevedzera masundesunde emasaisai

Ndini ndinopa chimiro Munhu ari zvaari pamusana pangu Imbwa inoonekwa nehumbwa hwayo Munhu anoonekwa nehunhu hwake

Ndini mubatanidzi Ndini maunganidze wevanhu Ndinopa pfungwa yekuziva kwawakabva Neyechikonzero chekurarama nechikonzero chekufa

Iwe munhu ukandidzvinyirira wazvidzvinyirira Ndakambofamba nemumarenje makarekare Ndichipinga nyika nemiko nehuyerwa Ndicharanga zvangu vanozvitadzisa maune

Kana ndada kudzosera, ini chivanhu cheAfrika

Mbira dzeNharira is an ancient style of music. It consists of Shona musical repertoires, folk tales and Spirit composed music. It is spiritual and can be played at traditional ceremonies, it has preserved the Shona culture and traditions through its art work.

== Discography ==
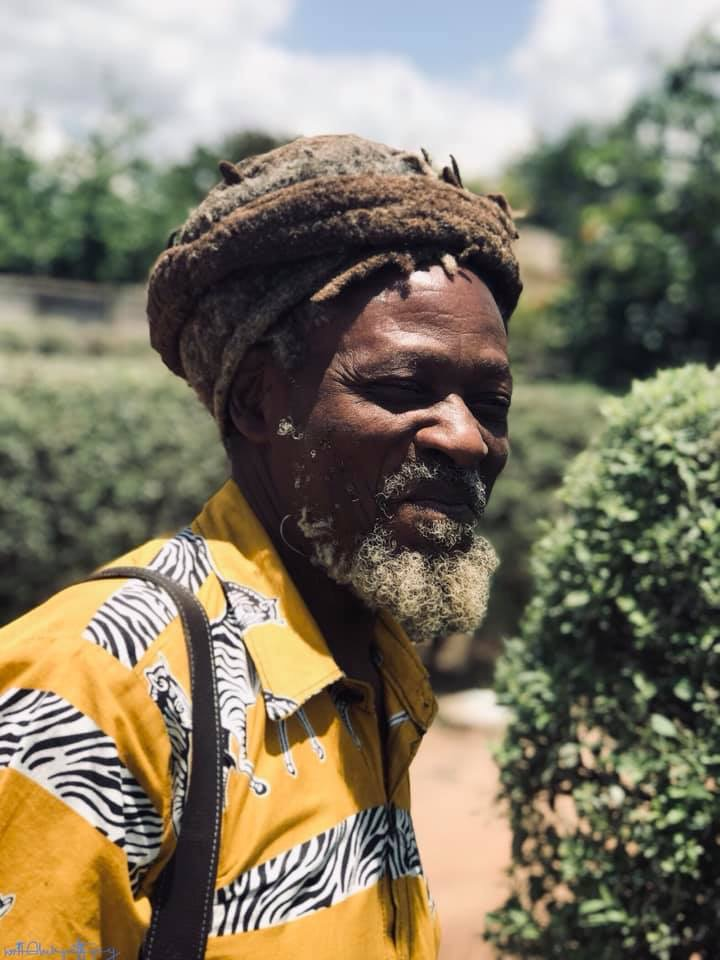
Tendayi Samaita Gahamadze, founding member of Mbira dzeNharira

=== CD albums ===
- Rine Manyanga Hariputirwe
- Gomo Remandiriri
- Kudya Kwenzeve
- Tozvireva Tingaputike Neshungu
- Toita Zverudo
- Gonamombe Rerume
- Fare Fare Tindike
- Todya Pfora
- Nyamubvambire Wamuka
- Dziva Renjuzu
- Bvungurungwi KwaWaze
- Chivimbanamuyeni

=== DVD albums ===
- Rwendo Rwekure
- Fare Fare Tindike
- Dziva Renjuzu

== See also ==
- List of mbira players
