= George Tawengwa =

Zimbabwean businessman

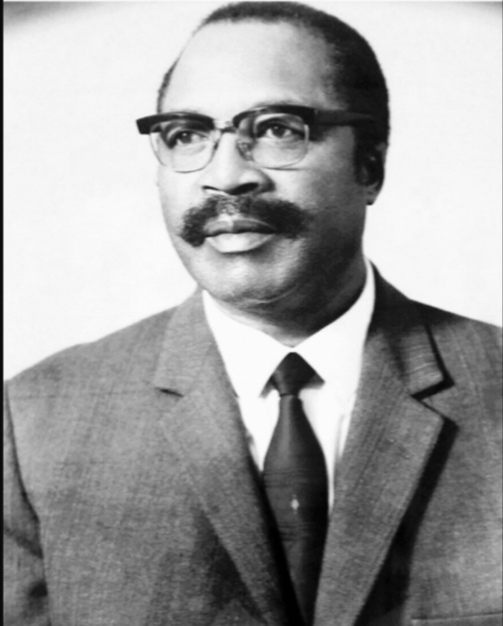
- Occupation: Entrepreneur
- Known for: Zimbabwe first black millionaire
- Notable work: Commercial Farmer

George Tawengwa (6 March 1902 – 13 April 1982) was a businessman who was engaged in transport, retail, and agriculture industries in Rhodesia.

== Early life and prophecy ==
Tawengwa was born to Chirume and Maria (Mhariya) of the Gumbo Madyira totem and had an elder brother, Takawira Chirume, who died within the first two years of birth as well as a younger brother, Bernard Chamunorwa Chirume. His mother died in 1919. It is rumoured she was poisoned as a consequence of polygamous rivalry.

The true dynamics of the father-son relationship have yet to be fully discovered, but were chronicled as not the most cordial. According to folklore, as a child, George became very ill, to the point of death. His father called a prophet to identify and possibly cure his son of his affliction. However, the prophet said that the sickness was a sign that the gods had chosen him for a mission, to reignite a lost cause and to one day hand the baton to the next generation and that he would become a wealthy and prominent person. Tawengwa's father and the rest of the village dismissed the prophecy as nonsense.

When Tawengwa was about 12 years old, he ran away from home after a fight with his father and ended up at Grinham Farm in Marandellas. There, Tawengwa started working as a shepherd for Robert Grinham, the Ruzawi School and Springvale House founder.

=== Using Tawengwa as surname ===
Because of his strained relationship with his father, Tawengwa dropped the surname Chirume in favor of his middle name Tavengwa, which was misspelled in some early documents as Tayengwa, and later anglicized to the current Tawengwa by district administrators.

Tawengwa left Grinham Farm when he was about 15 years old, and was hired at the Meikles Hotel as a dishwasher before being promoted to waiter. He used the money he earned in tips as a waiter to buy a wood planer, mesh wire and wood off-cuts to make sieves for people to refine their maize mealie-meal and other grain mealie-meals.

== Businesses ==
Tawengwa owned the Mushandira Pamwe Hotel, in Highfield, Harare which opened in 1972. The hotel was popular with Zimbabwean musicians with Oliver Mtukudzi, Simon Chimbetu, and Thomas Mapfumo having performed at the hotel.

He also owned the Mushandirapamwe Bus Service. At its peak the bus service ran a fleet of 150 buses. The Mushandirapamwe Business Centre was also developed by Tawengwa.

== Death ==
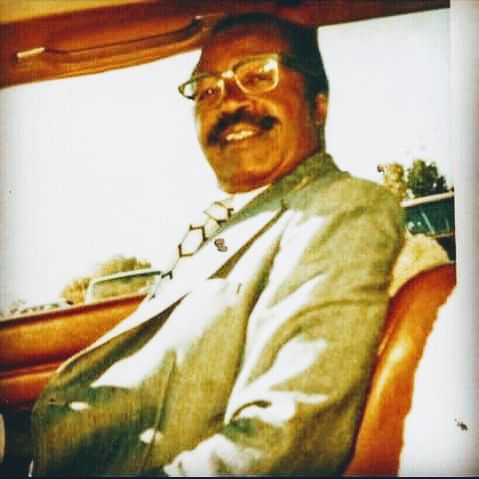
George Tawengwa Senior. Photo taken in the early 1980s before he passed in 1982

George Tawengwa died on 13 April 1982 at Parerenyatwa Hospital in Harare from diabetes. He was buried at Zimdale Farm (then Rhodesdale Farm), the first farm he purchased in 1960.
