= Mono Mukundu =

Zimbabwean musician

- Born: Clive Mukundu; September 15, 1970 (age 55); Rusape, Zimbabwe
- Genres: Mbira guitar, Sungura
- Occupations: Music producer, composer, instrumentalist, author
- Instrument: Guitars
- Years active: 1988-present

Clive 'Mono' Mukundu is a Zimbabwean music producer, composer, and multi-instrumentalist largely known as a guitarist. He is also an author. Mukundu has featured on more than 1,000 albums and over 200 singles from 1988 to date.

== Early life ==
Mukundu was born in September 1970 in town of Rusape, Zimbabwe. He is the second born in a family of eight children of George Mukundu and Joyce Gwatidzo.

He grew up in Harare suburbs Kambuzuma, Kuwadzana and Mufakose. He attended his high school at Mukombami Secondary School, Kambuzuma High School and Mufakose High School.

During his high school days, he had a single dreadlock (Mono-lock) hairstyle that earned him the nickname Mono.

== Career ==
His first interest in music began at a very early age but this was against his father’s wishes so he got punished each time he was seen holding any musical instrument. However, Mukundu made himself a homemade tin guitar which he played in private and he began composing music at that age of nine.

On 22 January 1988, at age 17, Mukundu met Last Saidi, a bass player who taught him his first three chords on a standard guitar, he then went on to teach himself to play the lead guitar by copying other guitarists on radio & other guitarists he came in contact with. Later that year, Mukundu learnt standard guitar and formed first band Sarungano chanters. The band failed more than 10 record deal auditions which had a toll on the band members and this led to the group’s split in 1989.

In 1989, after the failure of Sarungano chanters, Mukundu Joined Chax brothers, a band that played sungura, reggae and mbira music. The band included Admire Kasenga and Jackson Phiri; he left the band in 1990.

In 1990, Mukundu moved to Mutare where he co-founded the band Chikokoko. He left Mutare end of 1991 after recording the album Ruvengo, and the band went on a sabbatical break. During Chikokoko band break, Mukundu relocated to Mutare and joined The Hard workers band, a band that included guitarist Brian Nhanhanga. Chikokoko band dismantled in 1993.

In 1993, Mukundu formed Reggae duo with a friend Christopher Kamowa ”Chris & Mono”, but the duo disbanded after the failure of a number of demo tapes. In 1994, he joined “John Ali & the Marakashi band”, a band that played Congolese rhumba and Soukous, that was composed of Zimbabwean, Zambian and Congolese musicians and it disbanded same year. Later that year, Mukundu joined Egea Gospel Train on Tuesday 28 June 1994 after converting to Christianity, the band included Ivy Kombo, Annie Kombo and Carol Mujokoro. The group recorded the album ”Ndinokudai Jesu” and toured around Zimbabwe and Mozambique doing outreach programmes.

In 2001, Mukundu enrolled at the Zimbabwe College of Music, graduated in 2002 and was given best guitar student award.

He became guitar lecture at Zimbabwe College of Music, and also taught at Prince Edward school and Don Bosco youth training centre and also worked part time as a music producer for Ngaavongwe records

In 2003, he joined Oliver Mtukudzi and the black spirits band, toured around the world &recorded four albums together then left in 2007 after four years.

He opened Monolio studios in 2007 but also worked with Chiwoniso Maraire as part of her tour band which toured Europe in 2007 and 2008.

He is the current executive producer for Kambo Boys.

== Significant projects ==
Mukundu is featured on more than a thousand projects by Zimbabwean and international artists as a session musician and music producer. some of the notable artists include:

=== Notable recordings as a session musician/band member ===
- Oliver Mtukudzi - Zimbabwe
- Mango groove - South Africa
- Shingisai Suluma - Zimbabwe
- Lufuno Dagada - South Africa
- Somandla Ndebele – Zimbabwe
- Elias Musakwa - Zimbabwe
- Carol Chiwenga - Zimbabwe

=== Notable recordings as a producer ===
- Hope Masike - Zimbabwe
- Luciano -Jamaica
- Jah Prayzah - Zimbabwe
- Jane Osbourne - Zambia
- Transit Crew - Zimbabwe
- Joseph Tembo - Malawi
- Dereck Mpofu - Zimbabwe
- Sulumani Chimbetu - Zimbabwe
- Tocky Vibes – Zimbabwe
- Pah Chihera - Zimbabwe
- Ivy Kombo - Zimbabwe
- Willom Tight - Zimbabwe
- Selmor Mtukudzi - Zimbabwe

=== Notable hits featuring Mono on guitar ===
- Mapisarema - Mahendere brothers
- Tozeza baba - Oliver Mtukudzi
- Handiro dambudziko - Oliver Mtukudzi
- Kure kure - Jah Prayzah & Ammara Brown
- Toende kudenga - Fungisai
- Tofara - Celebration Choir
- Kazevezeve - Mafrique

=== Radio Hits as the producer ===
- Chisikana changu Zimbabwe
- Mari unonaka - Dereck Mpofu
- Karwiyo aka-Alexio Kawara
- Kure kure - Jah Prayzah (feat Ammara Brown)
- Roots - Jah Prayzah (feat Luciano)
- Rozi-Transit crew

== Discography ==
- 1 Jesu ishasha - Collaboration with Adbel Makumbi (2000).
- 2 Anosimudza marombe - Solo album (2001)
- 3 Jesu neni - Solo album (2002)
- 4 Poor & famous - Solo album (2006)
- 5 Super ngezha - Solo album (2007)
- 6 Zivai zvekuchema - Solo album (2009)
- 7 Forty - Solo album (2010)
- 8 Tunziyo for Jean - Solo album (2012)
- 9 Chronicles of a rough journey - Solo album (2013)
- 10 Gwenyagitare - Solo album (2017)
- 11 Acoustic re-visit - Solo album (2018)

== Books ==
- 2017 Following the melody (Auto-biographical but containing music industry tips)
- 2018 Poor and famous (Highlights the struggles faced by Zimbabwean musicians and gives advice on how artists can handle certain situations in the music industry)

== Personal life ==
Mukundu is married to Jean Kandeya Mukundu and they have two children together, Tariro Nyasha and Takakunda.
