= Lundi Tyamara =

South African gospel singer (1978-2017)

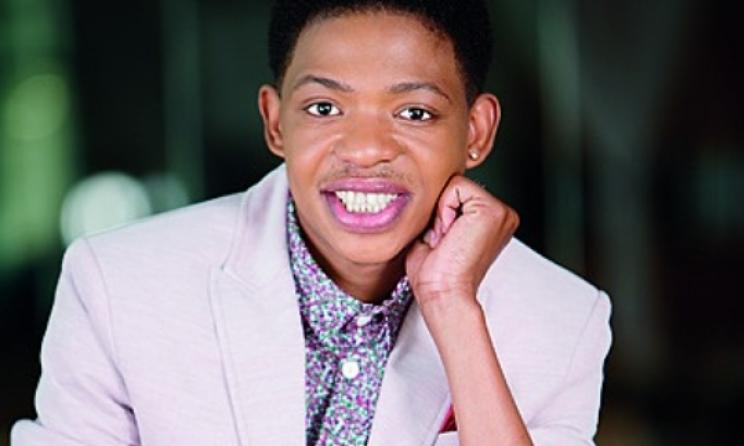
- Lundi Tyamara

Background information
- Born: 16 December 1978; Worcester, South Africa
- Died: 27 January 2017 (aged 38) Edenvale, South Africa
- Genres: Gospel music
- Occupation: Singer
- Years active: 1998–2017

Lundi Tyamara (16 December 1978 – 27 January 2017) also known as Lundi, was a South African gospel singer.

== Career ==
Lundi started as a backing vocalist for Rebecca Malope, he was then offered his first solo record deal by Tshepo Nzimande. In 1998, Lundi Tyamara released his debut album titled Mphefumlo Wami which sold almost 400,000 copies, he went on to release more than 20 albums in his career winning several awards. Lundi was one of the best selling gospel artists of all time in South Africa, selling over 3 million album copies.

== Death ==
He died of stomach TB and a liver condition at Edenvale Hospital in the East Rand and was buried in Worcester.

== Discography ==
=== Albums ===
- Mphefumlo Wami 1998
- Mvuleleni Angene 1999
- Ubuhlungu 2000
- Phaphamani 2001
- Lundi 2002
- Ngiyabonga 2004
- Lundi Live 2005
- Jeremiya 2005
- Umthandazo 2006
- Impilo 2007
- Inkos' Iyayazi 2008
- Uhambo Lwami 2010
- Ndim Lo (2012)
- New Testament 2014
- The Best of Lundi (Live) 2016
- Legacy 2017

=== Singles ===
- Mphefumulo Wami
- Nginga hlanzwa
- Mama Wami
- Mina Ngithemb'uJesu
- Akuvumi
- Bekungelula
- Moyo'ingcwele
- Tumelo ke theb
- Uma ngiguqa
- Thembela kuye
- Uthando lukababa
- Mvuleleni angene
- Phaphamani
- Ngaphakathi
- Mawuhlakaniphe
- Bawo Wethu
- Hlala Nami
- Bawo
- Bohlala Bejabula
- Wakrazulwa
- Nxolele
- Nginike amehlo
- Onqonqozayo
- Umama
- Ndim Lo Nkosi
- Ungumalusi
- Nkosi sihlangene
- Bulelani ku Jehova
- Benzenjalo
- Leth'ukukhanya
- Siyakubonga
- Ezulwini
- Langa lomphefumlo

== Awards ==
- Best Gospel artist at the Kora Awards 2003
- Best African Traditional Gospel – South African Music Awards 2008
- Classic Of All Times Size Sifike Ezweni – Crown Gospel Music Awards 2010
- Best Music Video – Crown Gospel Music Awards 2014
