= Zimbabwe Academy of Music =

Zimbabwean music school

Location
- Famona, Bulawayo, Zimbabwe; 20°10′1.99″S 28°35′13.01″E

Information
- Established: 1949; 77 years ago
- Website: Official website

The Zimbabwe Academy of Music, founded in 1949, is a music school and non-profit organization in the Famona suburb of Bulawayo, Zimbabwe.
