= Ndebele music =

Traditional music of the Ndebele people

The traditional music of the Ndebele is characterised mainly by the widespread use of choral song accompanied by leg rattles (amahlwayi), clappers (izikeyi) and clapping of hands. Compared with choral song, solo singing and purely instrumental music are of minor importance, similar to the Southern Ndebele people sound which is often referred to as Inodo (umvumo wesiNdebele), Like the Shona, The Southern Ndebeles also use mouthbows (umqangala) and gourd-bows (icaco), played mostly for self-amusement.

== Ndebele musicians ==
There are many Ndebele songwriters and bands, mainly Zimbabwean artists, who have been heavily influenced by the Ndebele story telling ways.

- Albert Nyathi
- Afrida Band
- Andy Brown & The Storm
- Ilanga
- Kampi Moto & George Phiri
- Louis Mhlanga
- Marsha Moyo
- Thabani Band
- Ziyaduma
- Sandra Ndebele

One of the described Queens of Ndebele music is Nothembi Mkhwebane, who became an international star with her band The Siblings.

Most Ndebele musicians are merited for outstanding accomplishments in the music industry by Bulawayo Arts Awards.
