= Safirio Madzikatire =

Zimbabwean artist

- Other names: Mukadota
- Citizenship: Zimbabwe
- Occupation(s): comedian, musician, actor
- Notable work: The Mukadota Family

Safirio Gendie Madzikatire, also known as Mukadota, was a multi-disciplinary artist specialising in comedy and music. His nickname comes from his role as Mukadota Baba VaRwizi on The Mukadota Family, a Shona TV drama which ran on Zimbabwe Broadcasting Television (ZTV) in the 1980s and early 1990s.
