= Holy Ten =

Zimbabwean rapper and songwriter

- Also known as: Mujaya
- Born: Mukudzei Chitsama; 18 November 1998; Harare, Zimbabwe
- Origin: Karanga
- Genres: Hip Hop; Afrobeats
- Occupations: singer; songwriter; music producer
- Years active: 2016–present
- Label: Samanyanga Sounds
- Website: YouTube (Holy Ten); TikTok (Holy Ten); Instagram (holytenmusic)

Mukudzei Modecay Chitsama (born 18 November 1998), known professionally as Holy Ten is a Zimbabwean Hip-Hop artist, songwriter and music producer, nicknamed "Mujaya or Ba Ju" by his fans.

He was born in Harare, Zimbabwe. Holy Ten – who dubs himself the "Leader of the Youth" and "Speaker of the Truth" – has emerged as a significant voice in the Zimbabwe hip hop genre. He is recognized for his incisive social commentary and deep voice.

== Career ==
He made several collaborations which include the one he did with Voltz Jt, titled How Far. He is also known for beefing up with his rivals like Voltz Jt. He once said that he was disappointed by fellow artists' albums referring to Jah Prayzah and Winky D’s albums. He dominated Changamire Awards in March 2023. He rallied behind president Emmerson Dambudzo Mnangagwa in 2023 Zimbabwean general elections.

== Albums ==
- Early Retirement (2018)
- Suicide Notes (2019)
- Risky Life (2021)
- Energy (2022)
- Book of Malachi (2023)
- New Bhundu Boyz (2023)
- Risky Life 2 (2024)
- Proud Father (2024)
- Musoro WeNzou (2025)
- Risky Life Interludes (2025)
- Risky Life 3 (2026)
