= Carol Mujokoro =

Zimbabwean musician and pastor

Carol Mujokoro (born Carol Chivengwa) is a Zimbabwean Christian/gospel music artist and pastor.

== Biography ==
Carol Mujokoro is a Zimbabwean Christian Musician, Songwriter, Composer as well as a Pastor.

She started her professional music career in the early 1990s then later enrolled for a Diploma in Biblical Studies & Christian Leadership with the Africa Multination for Christ College (AMFCC) from 2008–2010.

After obtaining a diploma from AMFCC, she went on to enrol for a degree in Biblical Studies with Friends University and later on a Master's Degree and a Doctorate from Triune University.

== Discography ==
=== Albums ===
- 1993: Mufudzi Wangu
- 1994: Ndinokudai Jesu
- 1995: Vimba NaJehovah
- 1996: Kutenda
- 1996: Ropa RaJesu
- 1999: NdiMwari Baba
- 2001: Jehovah Wakanaka
- 2003: Ngatimunamate
- 2004: Mufudzi Wakanaka
- 2006: Nditungamirei
- 2007: Kunamata Kungwara
- 2011: Champions
- 2017: X-Trim Worship 1
- 2020: X-Trim Worship 2

== Videography ==
- 2003: In the Holy Land
- 2006: Nditungamirei
- 2017: X-Trim Worship 1
- 2020: X-Trim Worship 2

== Tours ==
Mujokoro has toured major towns of Zimbabwe performing at musical concerts as well as church crusades. She has also toured most of the SADC countries as a Musician.

In 2003, she toured The Holy Land, Israel specifically to see the land where Jesus Christ lived and to record a music video for the album Ngatimunamate. She became the first Zimbabwean gospel artist to achieve that feat.

== Awards ==
- 2000: TSAMA (Tinotenda Siyabonga Annual Music Awards) Best Female Artist.
- 2012: ZimPraise Legendary Award for her contribution in shaping the Zimbabwe Gospel Music genre.
- 2014: PERMICAN award from ChristTV
- 2016: PERMICAN Legendary Award

== Qualifications ==
- Doctor of Philosophy in Theology - Triune Biblical University
- Master of Theology - Triune Biblical University
- Bachelor of Biblical Studies - Friends International Christian University
- Diploma in Biblical Studies & Christian Leadership - Africa Multination For Christ College
- Palliative Care Training - Island Hospice
- Executive Secretarial Studies - PITMANS
