= Leonard Mapfumo =

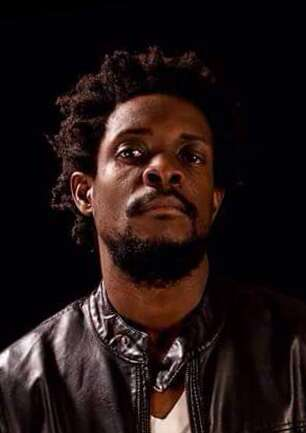
- Leonard Mapfumo, in 2017

Background information
- Birth name: Leonard Mapfumo
- Also known as: Leo
- Born: January 30, 1983 (age 42)
- Origin: Harare, Zimbabwe
- Genres: Urban grooves, hip Hop
- Occupation(s): Singer-songwriter, Dancer, Choreographer, Actor
- Instrument: Vocals
- Years active: 2000–present
- Labels: Chamembe

Leonard Mapfumo (born January 30, 1983) is an urban grooves/hip-hop artist from Harare, Zimbabwe. Active on the national hip-hop scene since 2000, he has gained recognition as one of the fathers of Zimbabwean urban sounds, with four number one hits on the national charts.

== Early life ==
Mapfumo was born in Highfields, a high-density suburb of Harare, before moving with his family to Mbare, another high-density suburb, at age 11. He attended Kudzanai Primary School until grade 7, when he moved to Mount Pleasant High School.

== Early career ==
Mapfumo began recording and performing immediately upon graduating high school in 1999. His first commercial success came with the single “Seiko”, on which he featured Rockford Josphat (Roki), and topped the national charts upon its release in 2000.

In 2005 he released his first album, R & L, a collaboration with Roki. The album's success, particularly Mapfumo's single “Maidei”, established him as a fixture in the Zimbabwean urban music scene. “Maidei” also reached number 1 on the national charts, staying there for an unprecedented 42 weeks (still a record).

During this early period of his career Mapfumo toured extensively in Zimbabwe.

== 2007 to present ==
In 2007 Mapfumo released his second album and first solo work, Namapfumo, and also founded his own studio, Heshi Mfeshi. The album was another success, scoring with the singles “Mvura” and “Chiuya”, the former reaching the top of the national charts. He continued intensive touring of Zimbabwe in promotion of the album.

Mapfumo then released The Journey in 2010, including the song “Two Chete”, which scored his fourth number 1 single. The album was released in South Africa under the Blue Diamond Record Company. Mapfumo then toured South Africa and Mozambique to promote the album. In South Africa he performed in Cape Town, East London and Johannesburg; in Mozambique he performed in Manica.

In 2012 Mapfumo released his fourth album, The Road to Israel. The album carried tracks which included, "Ndoita Manyemwe", "Chititi" and "One step at a Time". These songs topped the local charts with "Ndoita Manyemwe" reaching the number one spot. In the same year, Leonard Mapfumo toured the UK performing in Coventry and London.

In 2015 he toured China performing in three provinces, Chengdu (intangible cultural heritage festival), Tianjin and Beijing performing at the national center of the performing arts the equivalent of Apollo in Asia.

In 2016 Mapfumo released his fifth album, Access point 414317 with the single "Skiri Rebasa" making in onto the local charts shows and receiving overwhelming airplay on the local radio stations. In the same year he managed to do shows in the U.A.E, Hong Kong and mainland China.

Currently Leonard Mapfumo is working with Jacaranda Culture and Media Cooperation in talent searching, grooming and creating job opportunities for young talented individuals. Through the Dreamstar project, young people have been able to find employment in Zimbabwe and China through the Sino-Zim Cultural Exchange Program facilitated by Jacaranda Culture and Media Cooperation. Leonard Mapfumo is also an ambassador for a youth organisation called Dance4Life which address the issues of HIV and AIDS in young people.

== Style and influences ==
Mapfumo is often cited as being a father of the “urban grooves” sound in Zimbabwe. Mapfumo performs almost exclusively in Shona, utilizing with traditional sayings and proverbs.

He has collaborated with numerous other Zimbabwean musicians. His work with Roki, particularly on the single “Seiko” and their 2005 joint album R & L, played a key role in launching both artists to the forefront of the Zimbabwean music scene.

Other Collaborations includes the songs Mvura with gifted vocalist and another "Urban Legend" Sani Makalima, Two Chete with Trevor Dongo, Ndoita Manyemwe with Varaidzo, Huwii with talented vocalist Taurai Mandebvu.

Leo - as he is affectionately known, was also behind the rising of Zim-dance-hall legend Shinso

== Discography ==
- R & L (2005)
- Namapfumo (2007)
- The Journey (2010)
- The road to Israel (2012)
- Access point 414317 (2016)
