= Chartwell Dutiro =

Zimbabwean musician (1957–2019)

Chartwell Shorayi Dutiro (1957 – 2019) was a Zimbabwean musician, who started playing mbira when he was four years old at the protected village, Kagande; about two hours drive from Harare, where his family was moved by the Salvation Army missionaries during the Chimurenga. Even though the missionaries had banned traditional music, he learned to play from his brother and other village elders. His mother also encouraged him through her singing of traditional songs.

As a teenager Chartwell moved to the capital, Harare, and became saxophonist with the Salvation Army band. A little later, in 1986, he joined the world-famous band Thomas Mapfumo & the Blacks Unlimited. Touring the world for eight years with that band, he was their arranger, mbira player and saxophonist. From 1994 until his death in 2019, Chartwell based himself in Britain where he continued to teach and play mbira.

Chartwell had academic qualifications in music, including a degree in Ethnomusicology from SOAS in London where he also taught for many years.

Chartwell's solo album, released in 2000, is entitled Voices of Ancestors. He also has several recordings on CD in which he plays with the band Spirit Talk Mbira: Ndonga Mahwe (1997), Nhimbe (1999), Dzoro (2000), and Taanerimwe (2002). Chartwell also worked with Serenoa String Quartet to combine classical string quartet style with traditional African music.

From 2016 until 2019 he was part of the band Kusanganisa, a collaboration with Leandro Maia (guitar), Chris Blanden (bass guitar) and Nick Sorensen (saxophone). They recorded a live album.

In 2019 Chartwell recorded the album Musumo – Calling Ancestors, together with his partner Jori Buchel.

Chartwell Dutiro died in Devon, UK surrounded by loved ones on 22 September 2019. A week prior to his death he was awarded an Honorary PhD from Bath Spa University. His dissertation was entitled 'The Power of the Voices of the Ancestors: Mbira Music of Zimbabwe'.
