= Musekiwa Chingodza =

- Born: January 1, 1970 (age 55)
- Citizenship: Zimbabwean
- Occupation: Musician

Musekiwa Chingodza is a Zimbabwean mbira and marimba player and teacher. He was born in 1970 in Zimbabwe.

== Biography ==
Musekiwa Chingodza was born in Mwangara village, Murewa, Zimbabwe, in 1970. He began playing mbira at the age of five and is self-taught. Through listening to other gwenyambira, or great mbira players, he developed a strong attachment to and love for mbira music. He says, "Our music is both medicine and food, as mbira has the power to heal and to provide for people. Mbira pleases both the living and the dead". In 1991, Musekiwa was a key member of the band Panjea, founded by Chris Berry. He composed the hit song "Ganda" on Panjea's Zimbabwean album. Currently Musekiwa teaches mbira at Prince Edward School in Harare. He is a singer, dancer, drummer, and he plays both mbira dzavadzimu and nyunga nyunga. Following up on "Tsunga", his widely acclaimed CD with Jennifer Kyker, Musekiwa released his CD "VaChingodza Budai Pachena". His newest CD, "Kutema Musasa", was released in 2005.

== Discography ==
As Musekiwa Chingodza

- VaChingodza Budai Pachena (2004)
- Kutema Musasa (2005)
- Live in Santa Cruz (2012)

With Hungwe

- Tsunga (2001)
- Muronda Tsimba (2009)

With Mhofela

- Tomutenda Mambo (2010)

With Steve Spitalny

- Kudya Zvekukwata: Eating at Other People's Houses (2011)

With Tute Chigamba, Irene Chigamba, and Ngonidzashe Chingodza

- Muzazananda (2017)

With Sumi Madzitateguru

- Tauya Kune Vamwe (2017)
