= Garikayi Tirikoti =

- Born: April 29, 1961 (age 64)
- Occupation: Musician

Garikayi Tirikoti (born 29 April 1961) is a Zimbabwean Mbira player, instrument maker, composer, arranger and teacher of mbira music. Tirikoti is credited as the first to develop the 'mbira orchestra' where differently pitched and differently tuned mbiras are combined in a single performance. He has also been recognized for his Shona mbira creations, better known as thumb pianos. His 2003 album Maidei was described by the Portland Phoenix as having "amazing speed and precision" with "overdubbing to build a complex mesh of mbira lines and rich choral passages of call-and-response".
