= Mbuya Dyoko =

Zimbabwean musician (1944–2013)

- Born: 23 November 1944; Zvimba District
- Died: 26 May 2013 (aged 68)
- Occupation: Musician

Mbuya Beulah Dyoko, best known as Mbuya Dyoko (23 November 1944 – 26 May 2013) was a Zimbabwean musician.

== Life and career ==
Born in Zvimba, best known for the song "Makuwerere", Dyoko was the first female mbira musician to record her music commercially in the sixties. In June 2005, while she was touring in the US, as a collateral effect of Operation Restore Order her backyard cottage was destroyed and, pushed by psychological stress, she turned alcoholic. She was later diagnosed with a liver cirrhosis, and, when treated by American specialists, she suffered heavy injuries (including the loss of her teeth) and she died at her St. Mary's home in Chitungwiza.
