= Cosmas Magaya =

Zimbabwean musician (1953–2020)

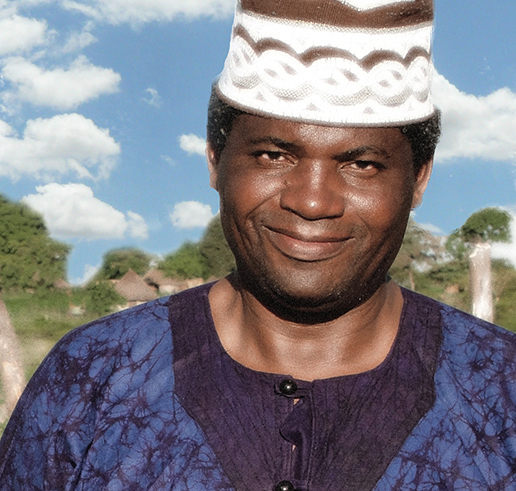

Background information
- Born: October 5, 1953; Mhondoro-Ngezi, Southern Rhodesia
- Died: July 10, 2020 (aged 66) Harare, Zimbabwe
- Occupations: Musician, teacher
- Instrument: Mbira
- Website: humwe.org

Cosmas Magaya (5 October 1953 – 10 July 2020) was a Zimbabwean mbira musician.

== Background ==
Raised in the rural areas of Mhondoro-Ngezi, Magaya played a role in the research of musicologist Paul Berliner's books The Soul of Mbira (1978), The Art of Mbira (2019), coauthored with Berliner Mbira's Restless Dance (2020) and also performed mbira on the accompanying Soul of Mbira audio recordings released by Nonesuch Records. Magaya performed internationally in Europe and the United States with Mhuri Yekwa Rwizi, and the Zimbabwe Group Leaders Mbira Ensemble, including members Hakurotwi Mude, Beauler Dyoko, Chaka Chawasarira, Simon Magaya and Paul Berliner.

Magaya died from COVID-19 during the COVID-19 pandemic in Zimbabwe on 10 July 2020.

== Leadership positions ==
Magaya was also Program Director for Nhimbe for Progress, a non-profit organization serving impoverished villagers in the Mhondoro region of Zimbabwe. He sat on the Board of Directors of Tariro, a grassroots non-profit organization working in Zimbabwe to prevent the spread of HIV/AIDS by educating young women and girls. Cosmas Magaya was the Village Head of Magaya/Zvidzai Village under Chief Nherera of Mhondoro.
