= Anna Mudeka =

Zimbabwean-British musician (born 1976)

- Occupation: business executive
- Known for: Norfolk World Music Festival

Anna Soko Mudeka is a Zimbabwean-British musician, actor, business executive and music festival organizer. Since 2008 she has been the organizer of the Southburgh Festival of World Music in Southburgh in the Breckland district of mid-Norfolk, East Anglia, England. Also some local festivities.

The festival raises money for the Mudeka Foundation, a charity that seeks "... to provide orphans in Zimbabwe with an opportunity for an education."

== Stage performances ==
Since 2022, she has acted and sung multiple performances of Mama Afrika, a single-person, two-act stage performance based on the life and music of Miriam Makeba. The play was scripted by Zimbabwean writer Tomas Lutuli Brickhill and directed by Tonia Daley-Campbell:

- 2022: Five one-night venues across East Anglia
- 2023: Ten one-night venues from London to Edinburgh
- 2024: Nine one-night venues from London to Edinburgh
- 2025: Twelve one-night venues spread from Bristol to Nottingham

=== Televised performances ===
On 25 March 2026, Mudeka's ensemble, The African Choir of Norfolk performed at the televised installation of Sarah Mullally as the first female Archbishop of Canterbury in Canterbury Cathedral.
