= Busi Ncube =

Zimbabwean musician

- Born: June 15, 1963 (age 63)
- Citizenship: Zimbabwe
- Occupation: Singer

Sibusiswe "Busi" Ncube (born 15 June 1963) is a female mbira musician and singer from Zimbabwe, who sings in six African languages. She play the guitar, mbira and percussions.

She was a member of the Afro-Fusion group Ilanga; the group released three albums during the 1980s, and played during the 1988 Human Rights Now! concert. She have been in the music industry for the past 34 years as a recording and performing artiste. Other than music, she is a teacher by profession and she now teaches in Norway.

Busi and her twin, Sipathisiwe, were born in Bulawayo. She is a mother of two children Tendai and Angeline

Ncube later recorded eight albums with a backing band, "Rain", including Malaisha and Live in Prague. Her most famous song is True Love recorded during her time with the band Ilanga. The band toured Norway in 2006 and appeared at the Mela Festival. Ncube has also contributed to another Thulani project, all-star collaboration album "Hupenyu Kumusha/Life at Home," released in 2006, which featured several notable Zimbabwean musicians, including Chiwoniso Maraire, Roger Mbambo, Adam Chisvo and Mashasha. Busi currently divides her time between Harare and Oslo, where she teaches and performs.
