= Ezekiel Guti =

Zimbabwean Pentecostal Archbishop (May 1923–2023)

Apostle Ezekiel Handinawangu Guti
- Born: Ezekiel Handinawangu Guti; 5 May 1923; Ngaone, Chipinge, Rhodesia
- Died: 5 July 2023 (aged 100); South Africa
- Occupations: Pastor, Prophet, Evangelist, Apostle, Archbishop
- Years active: 1948–2023

Ezekiel Handinawangu Guti (5 May 1923 – 5 July 2023) was a Zimbabwean Pentecostal archbishop, best known as the founder and president of Zimbabwe Assemblies of God Africa (ZAOGA), also known as Forward In Faith Ministries International (FIFMI) worldwide.

== Early years ==
Ezekiel Guti was born on 5 May 1923 in Ngaone, Chipinge, Manicaland Province, Rhodesia (now Zimbabwe). He preached for 75 years non-stop.

== Church Ministry ==
ZAOGA FIFMI was established on May 12, 1960, under a gum tree in Bindura, Zimbabwe. Over the years, it grew rapidly and expanded to more than 168 nations and states worldwide. The ministry has acquired centers in various countries, including Africa, Europe, the Americas, Australia, New Zealand, and others, following its vision of being a debt-free organization that is anchored on establishing a self-supporting, self-administrating and self-propagating church. In different regions, the church operates under different names, such as Forward In Faith Church International Incorporated (FIFCII) in the United Kingdom and Assembleia De Deus Africana (ADA) in Mozambique and other Portuguese-speaking nations.

As part of his ministry, Archbishop Ezekiel Guti founded seven Bible colleges named Africa Multi-Nation For Christ College, spread across Zimbabwe, Mozambique, Zambia, and Ghana. Additionally, he established various ministries, including Forward in Faith Children’s Home, Children's Ministry, Africa Christian Business Fellowship, Gracious Women's Fellowship, and Husband's Agape International Fellowship. Throughout his life, he authored over 113 books on his teachings.

== Education ==
Archbishop Ezekiel Guti held several academic credentials, including BA, MA, DD, D.Min, and a Ph.D. in Religion. He earned a Bachelor of Christian Education and a Doctorate from Northgate Graduate School and Zoe College, U.S.A. He was also instrumental in initiating the establishment of Zimbabwe Ezekiel Guti University in Bindura, Zimbabwe, and the Mbuya Dorcas Hospital in Waterfalls, Harare.

== Personal Life and Family ==
Archbishop Ezekiel Guti was married to Archbishop and Prophetess Eunor Guti. He preached for 75 years. He had a blessed family and some of them are full time pastors in the ministry. They faced a loss when their son, Ezekiel Jnr, who suffered from speech impairment and physical disabilities, drowned in a swimming pool in December 2017.

== Death ==
Archbishop Ezekiel Guti died on 5 July 2023 at the age of 100. After his body was repatriated from South Africa, the President of Zimbabwe, H.E. ED Mnangagwa, and Vice President CDG Chiwenga visited the family to pay their condolences. Ezekiel Guti was declared a national hero, with President ED Mnangagwa highlighting his significant impact and results. He was buried in Bindura mountain, in his first church.

== Books ==
Archbishop Ezekiel Guti authored numerous books, some of which include:

- Two Ways of Knowing God
- Effective Preaching that Draws People to God
- Foundations: Exploration of Bible Doctrinal Study (Protection Against Hearsay)
- Guidance and Example of a Praying Church
- A manager who lost his Job due to false accusation
- Saved Baptized and filled with the Holy Ghost
- Sunday Morning Bible Study
- Talents
- Does Your Marriage look like this
- What Makes Church To Grow: A Relay of Three Leaders
- Human Beings cannot change without Pressure
- Saved, Baptised and Filled with the Holy Spirit
- The Hidden Treasure in the Kingdom of God
- So I am an Elder

He was also the subject of various books, including African Apostle by Gayle Erwin, The Remained Unspoken of the African Apostle by Robert Takavarasha, African Gifts of the Spirit by David Maxwell, and Ezekiel Guti, A Portrait of Leadership by Samuel Mayinoti.

== Sources ==
Forward in Faith Ministries International | ZAOGA - Forward in Faith Ministries International official website. Erwin, Gayle D. African Apostle. Servant Quarters. Cathedral City, California, 1985 Mayinoti, S. Ezekiel Guti A Portrait of Leadership, Africa Blossom. Windhoek, 2021 Maxwell, David. African Gifts of the Spirit. Ohio University Press. Athens, Ohio, 2006 Maxwell, David. Wise man. Ohio University Press. Athens, Ohio, 2006
