= Leonard Zhakata =

Zimbabwean singer

- Also known as: Karikoga (lit. meaning.- Loner)
- Born: Leonard Zhakata; 25 June 1968 (age 57); Zimbabwe
- Origin: Manicaland
- Genres: Sungura, adult contemporary
- Occupations: Singer-songwriter, dancer
- Years active: 1989–present
- Labels: ZMC, ZORA music

Leonard "Karikoga" Zhakata (born . 25 June 1968) is a Zimbabwean musician and singer. He writes and sings mainly in his native Shona tongue. Zhakata, who adorns trademark glittering outfits, is best known for his hits Hupenyu Mutoro, Batai Mazwi and "Gomba Remarara". However, it was his 1994 smash hit Mugove, from the album Maruva Enyika, which evaded government censorship and propelled him to national stardom.

== Background ==
He started writing his first song in 1986 and was a member of SUNGURA BOYS; Simon Chimbetu, Nicholas Zakariah, John Chibadura, Daiton Somanje, and Leonard Dembo were all part of the SUNGURA BOYS. From the group Zhakata split with his nephew Thomas Makion to create Maungwe Brothers. Simon Chimbetu split with his brothers Brian and Naison Chimbetu to create Dendera Kings. Nicholas Zakariah split to create Khiama Boys. Leonard Dembo went solo as well as Daiton Somanje.

In 1994 at the age of 26, he became the youngest Zimbabwean musician to sell more than 100,000 copies of an album, when his solo album Maruva Enyika sold more than 120,000 copies.

In 2006, Zhakata spoke out about the government and asked for the radio waves to be freed to allow Zimbabweans to operate radio stations. Some of his music is blacklisted by the government and banned on state radio due to perceived political statements.

Zhakata is a qualified Fitter and Turner and the only boy in a family of seven. Leonard Zhakata used to sneak from home and play music with his primary school mates. Then at Shiri Yedenga School in Glen Norah, Harare, at the age of thirteen, he had his first music composition "Baba vaSamson". Pursuing school and later serving for an apprenticeship, it took Leonard sometime before he could record. After, the frustration of being turned down by recording companies, he had his lucky break and recorded his first 12-inch entitled "Moyo muti" sometime in 1989, to be followed by an album "Yarira Mhera "in 1990.

Zhakata's songwriting skills continued to rise with the releases of chart busting songs such as 'Tungidza Gwenya' and 'Shungu dzemwoyo'. He however seemed to remain in the mediocre periphery of "Who is Who" on the Zimbabwean music scene, until the release of his mega chartbusting album Maruva Enyika with hit song Mugove in 1994. Backed by a very tight musical outfit, The Zimbabwean All Stars Band and a well choreographed dance display, this album set Zimbabwe on fire during the festive season of the same year. No party was complete without "Mugove" being played. Those who had doubted Zhakata's music mastery had to think again. All albums that followed thereafter Nzombe Huru, Vagoni Vebasa, and three others, established Zhakata within the Zimbabwean music household.

Zhakata nicknamed himself Karikoga, a word that means "Loner." This nickname appears to stem from the poverty he endured as a lone child. In fact, many of his albums have included at least one song dedicated to the suffering masses as well as to people whose upbringing was full of mishaps.

== Music rivalries ==
- Leonard Dembo
- Simon Chimbetu
- Alick Macheso
- Tongai Moyo

== Discography ==
- Sheshe Yangu, 1989
- Yarira Mhere, 1990
- Shungu Dzemoyo, 1991
- Maruva Enyika, 1994
- Nhamo Dzenyika, 1995
- Mandishorei, 1995
- Nzombe Huru, 1996
- Greatest Hits, 1996 (compilation)
- Vagoni Vebasa, 1997
- Ndingaite Sei?, 1998
- Pakayambuka, 1999
- Kumera Kwezora, 2000
- Original Rhythms Of Africa (ZORA) (also known as Ndiriwenyu), 2000
- Mubikira, 2001
- Hodho, 2003 (once banned in Zimbabwe)
- Udza Vamwe (Spread the message), 2004
- Tine Vimbo, 2006
- Zora meets Mbira (Zombi), 2009
- Gotwe (Last Born), 2011
- Zvangu zvaita, 21 December 2013
- Mutungadzose 8 July 2016
- Game Changer (released as a single with 2 versions)
- Musandityire (I am a Fighter), June 2020 (a single off the upcoming album titled Mupendero Wenguva)
- Mupendero Wenguva 14 December 2022
