= Harare International Conference Center =

Building in Zimbabwe

Coordinates: 17.825166°S 31.03351°E

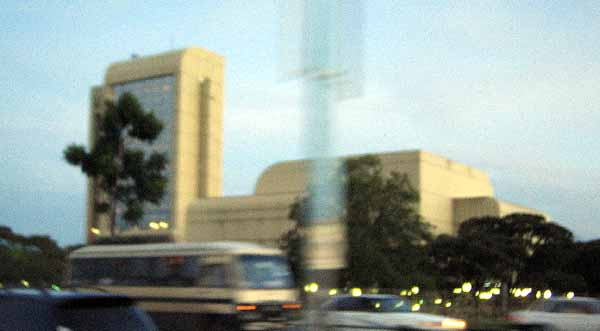
- 2005 blurry image of the center
- Interactive map of Harare International Conference Center
- Location: Harare, Zimbabwe

Construction
- Built: 1986
- Architect: Dragoljub Bakić and Ljiljana Bakić

Harare International Conference Center (HICC) is an events venue in Zimbabwe, known for hosting major events in the country. The venue is at the Rainbow Towers Hotel administered by Rainbow Towers Group.

The main conferencing auditorium has capacity of 4500 seats and indoor floor space of 10 000sqm which can host up to 128 exhibition stands. The venue was built by the Energoprojekt holding construction company from Belgrade, SFR Yugoslavia, ahead of the 8th Summit of the Non-Aligned Movement in 1986.

== Major events ==
- 8th Summit of the Non-Aligned Movement in 1986
- Joe Thomas Zimbabwe tour in 2008
- Mr Vegas show in 2011
- Harare International Carnival-2014
- Oliver Mtukudzi Greatest Hits Concert in 2014
- Fill Up HICC 2017
- Winky D Gombwe Album Launch February 2018
- Sanganai Tourism Expo
- Jah Prayzah birthday
- Atlas Convention 2020
- Winky D Njema Album Launch 31 December 2019
- Winky D Eureka Eureka Album Launch 31 December 2022
- Alick Macheso, Beatar Mangethe, CDE Chinx, Nicholas Zakaria, Tongai Moyo & Jayz Marabini for Independence Day April 2007
