= Simon Chimbetu =

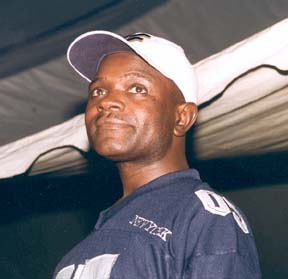

Background information
- Also known as: Chopper; Mr. Viscose
- Born: Simon Chimbetu; 23 September 1955; Harare, Zimbabwe
- Origin: Mashonaland West
- Died: 14 August 2005 (aged 49) Harare, Zimbabwe
- Genre: Sungura (Dendera music)
- Occupations: Singer, songwriter, musician, arranger, bandleader
- Instruments: Singing, rhythm guitar,
- Years active: 1975–2005
- Label: Gramma Records
- Formerly of: Oliver Mtukudzi, Allan Chimbetu, Orchestra Dendera Kings

Simon Chimbetu (23 September 1955 – 14 August 2005) was a Zimbabwean guitarist, vocalist and composer. He was the founding member of his band Orchestra Dendera Kings. He was known by many stage names, including "Chopper, "Mr Viscose" (before imprisonment), "Cellular", "Simomo" and "Mukoma Sam".

== Early life ==
Chimbetu was born in the Msengezi area of Hartley (Chegutu) District in Mashonaland West Province of Southern Rhodesia, on 23 September 1955. He was of the Yao tribe and his ancestral roots can be traced to the town of Tukuyu, in Southern Tanzania. His father Benson Mwakalile was a bricklayer and Simon regularly accompanied his father on his business errands. He attended the local Msengezi High School before trekking to Harare(then Salisbury) to look for employment.

== Rhodesian Bush War ==
During the Rhodesian Bush War, Chimbetu went to Tanzania to join the Zimbabwe African National Union (ZANU), which employed him as an entertainer for its guerrillas in exile. At some point prior to 1980, Chimbetu returned to Rhodesia.

== Return to Harare ==
Chimbetu worked for a tobacco processing company for many years after the attainment of Zimbabwe's internationally recognised independence in 1980. His passion for music did not wane. Rather, he regularly played at Mushandirapamwe Hotel in Highfield, a high-density suburb in Harare. At this point he was backed by John Chibadura's Sungura Boys as he did not have his own instruments. His younger brother, Naison backed him and together they performed as Marxist Brothers because of the then prevailing political ideology which had also shaped Simon's war experiences. Together, the siblings penned songs like "Dr Nero"(Naison) and "Nherera"(Simon) which gave them visibility on the Zimbabwean music scene. After recording several albums together, the two split in 1988 with Simon forming his own band, The Orchestra Dendera Kings while Naison formed his Gee(Great) 7 Commandos. It was after splitting with Naison that Simon recorded the hit album Nguva Yakaoma(Hard Times).

The album carried hits such as "Spare Wheel", the soulful "Samatenga", "Pasi Rapinduka", and others. "Samatenga" stayed at the number one spot for a long time; it was somewhat prophetic in that the suffering it describes was mirrored in Simon's own life soon after when he was arrested for theft/receiving stolen property. Although he pleaded his innocence, he was found guilty and incarcerated at Khami Prison in Bulawayo.

== Rise to fame ==
Chimbetu realised greater success when he went solo, recording classics like "Kuipa Chete", "Ngoma Yanditora Moyo", "Mwana Wedangwe", "Southern Africa" and many others. He called his brand of sungura 'dendera', a reference to the Southern Ground Hornbill's booming bass sound. Chimbetu's songs are distinguished by this deep, booming bass guitar.

What also distinguished Simon from many other sungura/museve artists at this time and throughout his career was that his music focused on contemporary social and political topics. The song "Kuipa Chete", for example, is about black Zimbabweans being abused and exploited economically by white commercial farmers. Towards the end of the 1990s, Chimbetu recorded many hits and grew to be force to reckon with on the scene. He is famous for penning and singing such songs as "Samatenga", "One Way", "Dzandipedza Mafuta" and many others. Simon also had a great facility with languages, being fluent in several and having in sung in Shona, Chewa, Ndebele and Swahili, among others. Chimbetu is also noted for his critical lyrics such as in the songs "Southern Africa", "Kuipa Chete" and "Simba Nederere", among many others.

Out of the two brothers, Chimbetu had the greater success. This was interrupted by his 4-year imprisonment from 1991 after being convicted of receiving stolen property. He was released in 1995 and immediately shot to the top with Pachipamwe (Welcome Back). The song "Saina", off Pachipamwe, was favourite of many at weddings and social gatherings. His albums Survival and Lullaby are highly critical of the Mugabe regime. One of Chimbetu's distinct successes was being able to reclaim his top spot even after being jailed for such a long time. While in prison, another musician, Leonard Zhakata had wooed many fans with his similarly styled beat and well thought out lyrics. After this purple patch, Simon's career plummeted after he became more directly linked to the ruling ZANU-PF party.

== Controversy and Decline ==
Chimbetu wasn't far from controversy during his career. At the peak of his popularity, he spent four years in jail and thereafter, rumours hit in 2002 that he hadn't paid his own farm workers for months. Additionally, his pro-government stance contributed to his somewhat rising unpopularity. As the economic situation in Zimbabwe worsened with the controversial land reform programme, musicians who were seen to side with the land reform and general ZANU-PF policies became unpopular.

His political rhetoric, with songs like "Pane Asipo", especially on the highly political album, Survival, was obviously out of tune with the masses. Some fans deserted him but many still liked his music. In "Zuva Raenda", (the sun is setting) Chimbetu laments the delays in redistributing the land from white to black Zimbabweans.

Chimbetu died on 14 August 2005, following injuries sustained in a car accident. Curiously, at the time of his death, his career appeared to be on the mend with the release of 10 Million Pounds Reward. On this album, he sings about many issues, one of which is the unequal resource distribution in Zimbabwe on the Chewa song, "Governor Cornwell". Chimbetu was of Chewa origin, although born and raised in Zimbabwe; when declared a provincial hero, his actual burial was kept a secret in line with his religious burial traditions. A younger brother who was already part of the Orchestra Dendera Kings, Allan, fronted the band for a while before Suluman Chimbetu, Simon's second eldest son took over. His eldest son being Collin "Kodza" Chimbetu who ventured into farming. He has recorded a well-received albums has toured overseas.He has managed to take over from Simon as well as he is a Simon lookalike which has popular musician Alick Macheso to mimick on stage that Sulu anenge Chopper literally translated as Sulu is like Chopper(Simon's common alias)

== Discography ==
=== The Marxist Brothers ===
Albums:

- Mwana Wedangwe (1983)
- Kunjere Kunjere (1985)
- Dendera Resango (1986)
- Afrika (1987)

Compilations:

- Sarura Yako (1992)
- Greatest Hits Of Early Music (1997)
- Early 80s Singles Collection (2009)

Singles:

- Emeli (1982)
- Selinah (Pt 1 & Pt 2) (1983)
- Isa Mwalimu (1983)
- Sarura Wako (1984)
- Vanhu Vatema (1987)
- S.Bakayawo (1993)

=== Orchestra Dendera Kings ===
Albums:

- Kuipa Chete (1988)
- Boterekwa (1989)
- Nguva Yakaoma (1990)
- Sold Gold (1990)
- Shura Regore Riya (1991)
- Ndouraiwa (1992)
- Karikoga (1993)
- Pachipamwe (1995)
- Zuva Raenda (1996)
- Survival (1997)
- Lullaby (1998)
- African Panorama – Chapter One (1999)
- 2000 Blend (2000)
- African Panorama – Chapter Two (2001)
- Hoko (2002)
- 10 Million Pounds Reward (2005)

Compilations:

- Takabatana (2003)
