= L kat =

Zimbabwean hip hop artist

- Born: Lovejoy Matare; Kwekwe, Midlands Province, Zimbabwe
- Genres: Hiphop
- Occupations: Lyricist, rapper
- Years active: 2007–present
- Label: Kats Music Group

Lovejoy Matare (born 13 September 1991), popularly known by his stage name L kat, is a Zimbabwean hip hop recording artist originally from Kwekwe, Zimbabwe. He records mostly in Shona, his native tongue. In 2005, he released his first single "Wandinoda" as part of his high school compilation album dubbed Manunure High School Mic Fever 1. In 2013, he released his debut studio album Goodlife while signed to Maskiri's record label, Mhondoro Music. The album was supported by the singles "Ndinotya", "Ndiudze", "Tisanyadzise", and "Kupiko". On 6 April 2015, he released an EP album The Golden Episode. The album's singles include "Zita Rako", "My Special Munhu" and "Rudo Ma1". L kat has won several music awards, including multiple Midlands Music Awards and also have been nominated in the Zimbabwe Music Awards.

== Early life and music career ==
L kat was born in Kwekwe, Zimbabwe. In 2005, he decided to pursue a career in music. In 2010, L kat opened for Oliver "Tuku" Mtukudzi, Winky D, Psyfo, Dj Cndo, Biblos and Andy X in their Kwekwe concerts.

=== 2011: Handaiziva ===
In February 2011, L kat released Handaiziva, the single which did well on Power FM. The song features POZee.

=== 2012 – present ===
In May 2012, L kat released "Ndinotya", "Kupiko", "Ndiudze", "Tisanyadzise" as lead singles off the Goodlife album. "Ndinotya", which features Maskiri, was well received throughout Zimbabwe landing him the Song of The Year Award and Best Producer Award at the 2012, Kwekwe Music Awards.

In November 2013, a concert was put together to launch the Goodlife album which received positive reviews from music critics. The album features guest appearances from Maskiri, Diana Samkange, POZee, Goodchild and others. The Goodlife album earned L kat a nomination for Best AfroPop Music at the Zimbabwe Music Awards and also won Best Digital Album at the Midlands Music Awards.

L kat was supposed to release an eight-track album titled Margaret on 28 March 2014. The album leaked before release date forcing L kat and his management to postpone the album release. L kat launched his own record label, Kats Music Group in November 2014. L kat also released "Rudo Ma1" which features Maskiri and The Golden Episode EP album under the label.

On 19 November 2015 L kat received a Nomination for Best Hiphop Music with his single Zita Rako from Zimbabwe Music Awards.

== Discography ==
=== Studio albums ===
- Goodlife (2013)

=== EP albums ===
- The Golden Episode (2014)

== Awards and nominations ==
L kat awards and nominations
Awards and nominations
Award	Wins	Nominations
Zimbabwe Music Awards	0	2
Midlands Music Awards	4	5
Kwekwe Music Awards	2	3

Totals (Note: Certain award groups do not simply award one winner. They acknowledge several different recipients, have runners-up, and have third place. Since this is a specific recognition and is different from losing an award, runner-up mentions are considered wins in this award tally. For simplification and to avoid errors, each award in this list has been presumed to have had a prior nomination.)
- Wins: 6
- Nominations: 10

Year	Event	Prize	Recipient	Result	Ref
2012	Kwekwe Music Awards (KWEMA)	Best Producer		Won	
2012	Kwekwe Music Awards (KWEMA)	Song of the Year	Ndinotya	Won	
2012	Kwekwe Music Awards (KWEMA)	Best Hiphop Music	Ndinotya	Nominated	
2014	Midlands Music Awards	Best Hiphop	Goodlife	Won	
2014	Midlands Music Awards	Best Collaboration	Tisanyadzise featuring Goodchild	Won	
2014	Midlands Music Awards	Best Music Album	Goodlife	Won	
2014	Zimbabwe Music Awards	Best Afro Pop Music	Goodlife	Nominated	
2015	Midlands Music Awards	Best Hiphop Music	The Golden Episode	Won	
2015	Midlands Music Awards	Best Collaboration	Rudo MaOne featuring Maskiri	Nominated	
2015	Zimbabwe Music Awards	Best Hiphop Music	The Golden Episode	Nominated	
