= Ninja Lipsy =

Zimbabwean dancehall musician (born 1987)

- Also known as: Ninja Lady
- Born: Tendazvaitwa Medea Chitimbe; April 3, 1987 (age 39); Harare, Zimbabwe
- Origin: Zimbabwe
- Genres: Dancehall
- Occupation: Singer-songwriter
- Instrument: Vocals
- Years active: 2002–present
- Labels: Ninja Lipsy Music; Mount Zion Records

Tendazvaitwa Medea Chitimbe (born April 3, 1987) is a Zimbabwean dancehall musician who adopted the moniker ‘Ninja Lady’ from her boss and mentor Winky D who is called Ninja President by his legion of fans. She first rose to fame after featuring in Winky D's song Taitirana paFirst Sight in 2011.

== Biography ==
Lipsy was born in 1987 in Harare, the capital of Zimbabwe, she attended Mbizi Primary School, one of the oldest and best primary schools in Harare's Old Highfield Suburb and Highfield 2 High School. She started her musical career as early as 2002 and joined Vigilance Records in 2009. While at Vigilance Records, she did a track ‘Taitirana’ with renowned dancehall artist Winky D. The collaboration made her to become popular. She has released songs such as ‘Kumaninja’ and ‘Mababie Anoita’. In February 2015, Ninja Lipsy was nominated for two awards in the 2014 Zimdancehall Awards. In 2021, she collaborated with Jamaican-born dancehall artist, Shalkal on his Single, 'Put God First.'

== Controversy ==
=== Pfee song ===
In 2018, Ninja Lipsy made waves with "Pfee", a song she did on the Avion Riddim produced by Levels of Chillspot Records and DJ Tamuka from the Jah Prayzah lead Military Touch Productions. She dismissed rumours about the song being a political endorsement of Emerson Munangagwa[President of Zimbabwe] saying while the title was open to various interpretations, it was not political. Pfee, which is a Shona idiophone that describes sudden action, was popularised as a Zanu PF slogan. The song has attracted mixed reactions from listeners, with others saying it had political connotations, while others felt it carried sexual innuendo.

“I talk about a driver who has to be cautious on the road to avoid accidents. Others also describe the song in a sexual manner but, well, it is for the listeners to give meaning to the song.”

“We have worked together with Tamuka as a collective with other artistes, but this was the first time we worked together without anyone else. The song was his idea. He just shared the concept with me when we were in the studio. I sampled the beat, wrote the lyrics and recorded in one day,” she said.

== Health ==
In 2018, Lipsy decided to come out and tell the world about her medical condition in a lengthy Facebook post, she told of how society had shunned her and how she had lost friends because of the epilepsy. and it has impacted on her career making it hard to perform at times.

“Other musicians shying to disclose their medical conditions need to understand that we are the people’s voice and our job is to entertain and learn at the same time. So they need to speak out and share what they go through from what they know,” said Lipsy

Epilepsy is a chronic disorder of recurrent unprovoked seizures. A person is diagnosed with epilepsy if they have two unprovoked seizures (or one unprovoked seizure with the likelihood of more) that were not caused by some known and reversible medical condition like alcohol withdrawal or extremely low blood sugar.

== Awards ==
=== Zimdancehall Awards ===
Year	Nominee / work	Award	Result	Ref
2014	Herself	Best Female Artiste of the Year	Nominated	
2014	Herself	Best Vocalist of the Year	Nominated	

== Discography ==
=== Albums ===
- Singles Collection Volume One (2019)

=== Singles ===
- Mazano (2019)
- Mukoma Edgar (2019)
- Pfee (2018)

== See also ==
- Afropop
- Music of Zimbabwe
