= Somandla Ndebele =

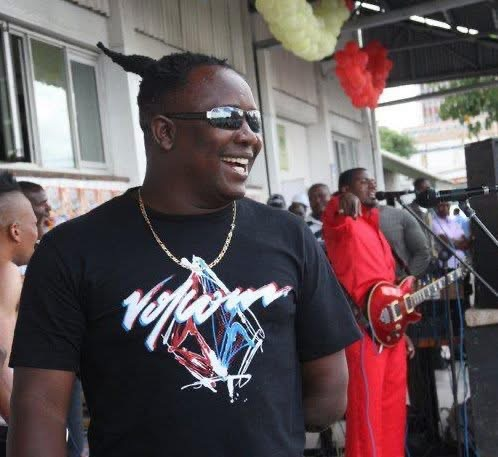
- Somandla Ndebele performing live with Tongai Moyo on the 25th of February 2011 at Megga 1 Bar, Harare

Background information
- Also known as: Soma, Mafia
- Born: Somandla Ndebele; December 14, 1970 (age 55)
- Origin: Kwekwe, Zimbabwe
- Genre: Sungura
- Occupations: Singer-songwriter, vocalist, composer
- Instrument: Vocals
- Years active: 1987–present
- Labels: Record & Tape Promotions (1992–1995), Gramma Records (1996–2006), Diamond Studios (2009–2017), Soma Music (2019-present)

Somandla Ndebele (born 14 December 1970) is a Zimbabwean Sungura artist, vocalist and composer. He is the founding member of the band Denda Brothers, a group named after a disease. Ndebele has been active in the Zimbabwean music industry since 1987 and is known by the nicknames Soma and Mafia, the latter given to him during his school years.

From 1992 to 1995, Ndebele was signed under the Record & Tape Promotions label before moving to Gramma Records in 1996. He rose to popularity with his hit song "Nditungamirireiwo" from the 1992 album Vanondivenga Havachapera, which marked the beginning of his national recognition.

== Early life ==
Somandla “Mafia” Ndebele was born on 14 December 1970 in Sidakeni Ward, Zhombe, Kwekwe. He was born and bred in Sidakeni Village, where his family's rural home is located. Ndebele is the first born in a family of three, with younger twin siblings.

He attended Sidhakeni Primary School before going on to Sidakeni High School. It was at Sidakeni High School that his passion for music began. As a member of the school choir, he developed his vocal ability and confidence. The choir later won first prize in a provincial choral competition, a moment that inspired him to pursue music more seriously. While he discovered his initial passion for choral music at Sidakeni High in Zhombe, he completed his secondary education back in Harare at Dzivaresekwa High 1.

During his childhood, Ndebele later relocated to Dzivarasekwa, Harare, where he continued to grow and refine his musical interests. Born with his left arm amputated, he became known for his resilience and physical strength, earning the nickname “Mafia” for standing up to bullies and overcoming challenges from a young age.

In 1986, while still in school, Ndebele met Sungura legend John Chibadura, who became a mentor and encouraged him to pursue a professional music career. Chibadura gifted him his first guitar, which Ndebele later used to record his debut single “Mandiomesera” in 1987 while still a student. The song entered the Radio 2 Top 20 charts, marking the beginning of his rise in Zimbabwean music.

== Discography ==
=== Albums ===
- Ndingazviite Sei? (1992)
- Vanondivenga Havachapera (1993)
- Chengeta Gotwe (1995)
- Ziva Zvaunoda (1996)
- Kusaziva Kufa (1997)
- Tendai (1998)
- Shara (1999)
- Moyo Wekurera (w/Tongai Moyo) (1999)
- Tave Parumano (2000)
- Chirangano (w/Tongai Moyo) (2001)
- Chinokanganwa Idemo (2002)
- Marwadzo (2003)
- Zvamauya Zvanaka (2004)
- Makobvu Nematete (2005)
- Chidamoyo (2006)
- Chitenderano (2007)
- Kutamba Hakubvaruki (2009)
- Ndipei Nguva (2011)
- Zvemberi Makasa (2013)
- Dada Newako (2017)
- Chinono Chinengwe (2019)
- Gumbomutsvairo (2020)
- Kuruma Uchifuridzira (2022)
- Atove Mazambuko (2025)

=== Singles ===
- Mandiomesera (1987) (Side B: Chidochemoyo)
- Baba Vevana (1988)
- Phumzile (1990)

=== Compilation ===
- Tsanangudzo (2002)
- Singles Collection (2024)
- Singles Collection 1 (2024)
- Singles Collection, Vol. 2 (2024)
- Singles Collection, Vol. VI (2024)
- Singles Collection, Vol. V (2024)
- Singles Collection, Vol. 3 (2024)
