= Chazezesa Challengers =

Zimbabwean Sungura music band

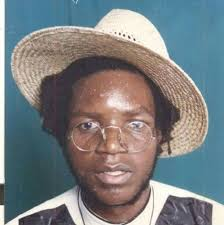
System Tazvida

Chazezesa Challengers are a Zimbabwean Sungura music band formed in 1993 under the direction of the late System Tazvida in Chitungwiza. System, a Khiama Boys alumnus, grew sick of not receiving his fair share of royalties and decided to form his own band. Both his stints in Khiama Boys and the Sungura Boys had ended without any financial compensation. He recruited some experienced musicians, including his bassist brother Peter. The band of five are veterans of the Zimbabwe music scene. His brother Peter is a Nyami Nyami Sounds alumnus. Guitarist LeeRoy Lunga had played with both the Super Sounds and the Kasongo Band, while percussionist Lucky Mumiriki had experience with the Hurungwe Sounds and the Sungura Boys. The group is also known as Boyz DzeSmoko.

== Music style ==
The group successfully mixed elements of sungura, jazz, South African mbaqanga and traditional sounds, creating an appealing and popular blend. The Chazezesa Challengers produced a string of hit albums in the mid-to-late 1990s; their debut, Rudo Tsika Nemagariro, sold more than 20,000 copies, while Mutunhu Unemago topped 30,000. Some of their top songs include Anodyiwa Haature, Kaserura Ndizvo, Smoko, Ndiridze Mhere, Ukarambwa Usacheme, and Vaforomani. System Tazvida is known for stressing that he liked better playing for rural crowds who he said liked and appreciated his music by singing along and dancing to it spiritedly when he did live shows. The Challengers were known for their humorous love lyrics and satirical subjects. The band also toured in Mozambique, where they were popular.

== Descent ==
The band experienced two deaths in quick succession, as drummer Wezhira Shoko and talismanic leader System Tazvida both died near the turn of the millennium. Peter Tazvida, System's brother who assumed leadership of the group after his brothers death also succumbed to illness in mid-2002. This, did not stop the group. Under the leadership of Lee Roy Lunga, the boys released their twelfth album, Smoko Pachena/Chabvondoka, in December 2002. The group however has seen waning popularity of Smoko and a decrease in sales of their music

== Other projects ==
The Chazezesa Challengers operate a variety of community projects in Zimbabwe. In addition to operating their own soccer team for the unemployed, the group owns runs a children's club, their own studios, and mechanic business.

== See also ==
- Music of Zimbabwe
- Shona music
