= Nicholas Zakaria =

Zimbabwean sungura musician (c. 1956–2025)

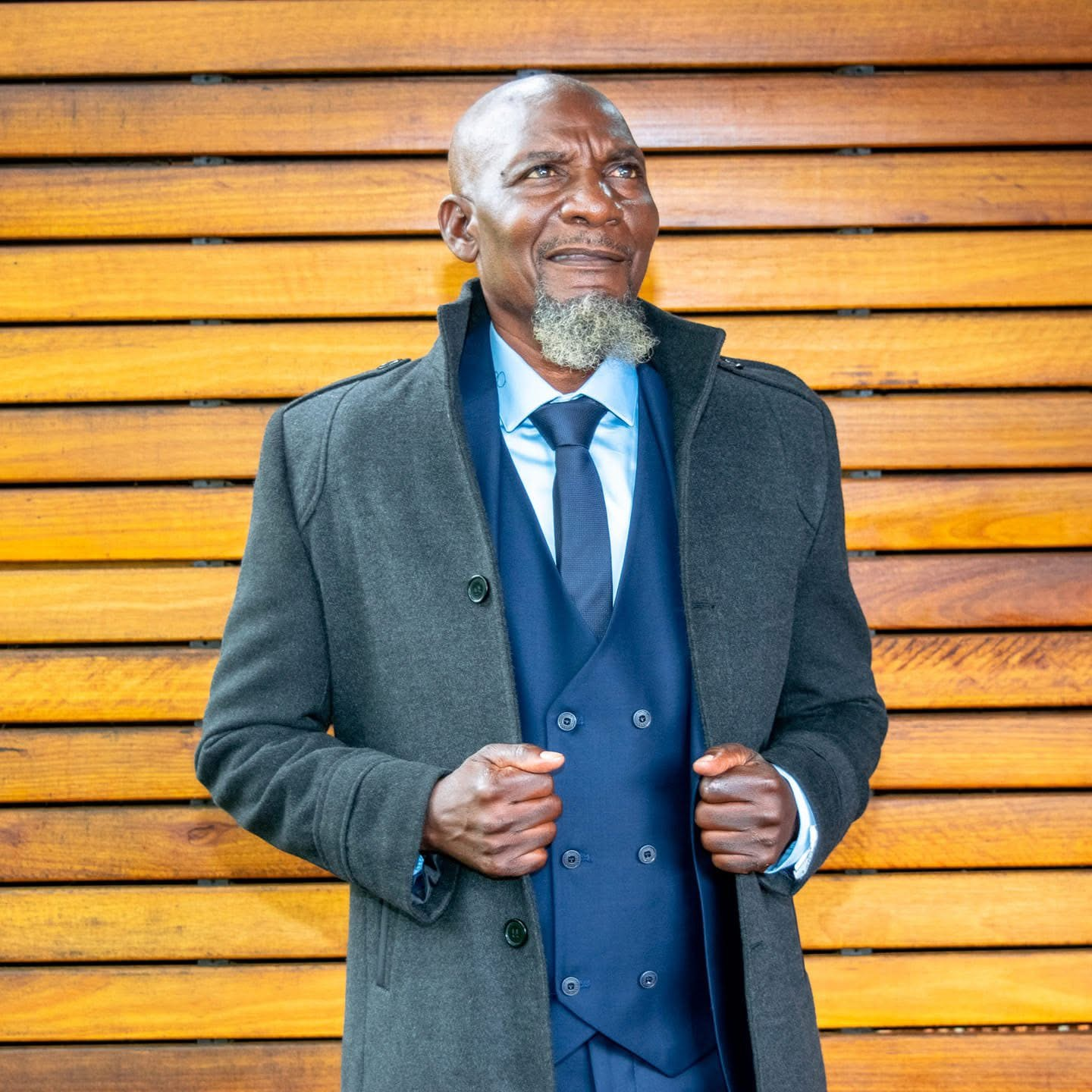
- Zakaria dressed by VIP Attire in 2022

Background information
- Also known as: Madzibaba, Senior Lecturer
- Born: 5 April 1956; Mazowe, Zimbabwe
- Died: 11 December 2025 (aged 69) Zimbabwe
- Genre: Sungura
- Occupations: Musician, songwriter, bandleader
- Instruments: Lead Guitarist, vocals & Rhythm Guitarist
- Years active: 1970–2025
- Formerly of: Khiama Boys
- Spouse: Margaret Gweshe

Nicholas Zakaria (5 April 1956 – 11 December 2025), also known as Madzibaba and Senior Lecturer, was a Zimbabwean sungura musician, guitarist and bandleader. He was best known as the founder and leader of the Khiama Boys, one of the most influential groups in Zimbabwean sungura music, and for mentoring several artists who later achieved major success.

== Life and career ==
Zakaria was born in the Mazowe area of Zimbabwe and became active in music during the 1970s. He later founded and led the Khiama Boys, a band that played a significant role in the development and popularisation of modern sungura music in Zimbabwe.

Several musicians who later became prominent figures in Zimbabwean popular music began their careers in the Khiama Boys under Zakaria’s leadership. These included Alick Macheso and System Tazvida. His role in developing younger talent earned him the nickname “Senior Lecturer”.

== Personal life ==
Zakaria was married to fellow musician Margaret Gweshe. His title “Madzibaba” reflected his apostolic faith and became a defining part of his public image.

== Discography ==
The "Senior Lecturer" had various singles and 24 albums to his name. The albums, compilations and singles he released and the years are as per below:

Albums:

- Kubva Kure (1990)
- Kutambura (1991)
- Kuva Nemari (1992)
- Chikumbiro (1993)
- Mabvi Nemagokora (1994)
- Ndine Mubvunzo (1995)
- Chiraramo (1996)
- Zvirimudzimba (1997)
- Yeuchidzo (1998)
- Tokundika here? (1999)
- Mashoko (2000)
- Dzidziso (2001)
- Ramangwana (2002)
- Munongedzo (2003)
- Chiedza (2005)
- Mbuva Yeupenyu (2006)
- Simbiso (2008)
- Ruvheneko (2010)
- Kurapa Nemazwi (2012)
- Rumbidzo (2014)
- Takakomborerwa (Featuring Alick Macheso on two songs) (2017)
- Inzwa Unzwe (2019)
- Zadziso with Simon Mutambi (2020)
- Musabvunda (2022)

Compilations:

- Singles Collection Volume 1 (Mabhauwa) (1996)
- Singles Collection Volume 2 (Shamiso) (1997)
- The Best Of Khiama Boys (1999)

Singles:

=== 1986 ===
- Makhwala Olemela (written by Nicholas Zakaria)
- Makamure (written by Nicholas Zakaria)
- Sheba (written by Nicholas Zakaria)
- Shamwari Yangu (written by Nicholas Zakaria)

=== 1987 ===
- Abale Anga (written by Nicholas Zakaria)
- Ndine Zvinondinetsa (written by Margaret Gweshe)
- Mwana Ume (written by Margaret Gweshe)
- Yusitina (written by Nicholas Zakaria)
- Cecilia (written by Nicholas Zakaria)
- Mwari Baba (written by Nicholas Zakaria)

=== 1988 ===
- Ndiri Munhamo (written by Nicholas Zakaria)
- Hanzvadzi Yangu (written by Nicholas Zakaria)
- Chipo (written by Margaret Gweshe)
- Taurai Chandakatadza (written by Margaret Gweshe)

=== 1989 ===
- Mabhauwa (written by Cephas Karushanga)
- Nhano (written by Cephas Karushanga)
- Mwana Wangu Wakura (written by Margaret Gweshe)
- Kupereka Moni (written by Nicholas Zakaria)
- Hupenyu (written by Margaret Gweshe)
- Pwere Ipwere (written by Nicholas Zakaria)

=== 1991 ===
- Shamiso (written by Alick Macheso)

=== 1992 ===
- Nyamulani Kasu (written by Nicholas Zakaria)
- Tsiga (written by Nicholas Zakaria)
- Amai NaBaba Usavakanganwe (written by Nicholas Zakaria)
- Lucy (written by Nicholas Zakaria)

All tracks were produced by Bothwell Nyamhondera. This list reflects the most commonly documented Khiama Boys singles from that era.

== Death ==
Zakaria died on 11 December 2025 after a period of ill health. Contemporary media reports stated that he had been battling chronic conditions, including diabetes and hypertension, in the months leading up to his death.

== See also ==
- Sungura
- Music of Zimbabwe
