= James Chimombe =

- Born: James Chimombe; January 1, 1951; Zimbabwe
- Died: 1990 Zimbabwe
- Genre: Country
- Occupation: Singer-songwriter
- Instruments: Vocals, guitar, piano,rhythm guitarist
- Years active: 1951–1990
- Military career

James Chimombe (1951–1990) was a Zimbabwean vocalist and a guitarist. His career included stints with OK Success, the Acid Band, the Ocean City Band, and the Huchi Band. His music melded Kenyan, South African, and Congolese influences into Zimbabwean music. James also worked American Country & Western sounds into his music, combining them with African horns and light, lilting guitar lines. James Chimombe is known as the Phil Collins of Zimbabwe . Had he been alive today, he would have been as well known as Tuku. Tuku and Chimombe are both sons of Highfields, a.k.a. Fio. His music was soulful and presented the heart of the Shona culture.

== Biography ==
Chimombe got his start as a rhythm guitarist with Thomas Mapfumo and Oliver Mtukudzi. He next moved to the Blacks Unlimited and OK Success. As one of Zimbabwe's first resident Congolese bands, OK Success recruited top Zimbabwean musicians and produced a string of hits in the 1960s and 1970s.

Paul Tangi Mhova Mkondo owner of Club Hide-Out 99 was instrumental in establishing James Chimombe who was the resident musician at Club Hideout 99. During the 1980s Chimombe led the Ocean City Band, and led the Huchi Band until his death. He also spent some time with the Real Sounds of Africa. He was fired from the Ocean City Band and the reason was never revealed to the public, he went on to form his own outfit Huchi Band that he led until his death, The two albums he recorded with Huchi Band were only released after his death. Chimombe is best known for his hit songs "Jemedza", "Kudakwashe", “George Mudiwa” and "Bindura". Chimombe was heavily influenced by Motown Stars especially Lionel Richie. Chimombe and the OK Success band would during the week sessions sometimes sing and perform Lionel Richie his personal favourite being "stuck on you" at Club Hide Out 99 where he was the resident artist.

== Discography ==
=== Albums ===
- Nyamupfukudza, J Chimombe & The Ocean City Band
- Cecilia, J Chimombe & The Ocean City Band
- Mavanga, 1982, J Chimombe & The Ocean City Band
- Munakandafa,1987, J Chimombe & The Ocean City Band
- Zvaitika, 1989, J Chimombe & The Huchi Band
- Jemedza, 1990, J Chimombe & The Huchi Band
- Early Hits
- Best of Chimombe
- Greatest Hits 1
- Greatest Hits 2
- Greatest Hits 3

=== Singles ===
- Kudakwashe
- Botswana, J Chimombe & Huchi Band
- Ropa rangu
- Karigaduri, J Chimombe & The OK Success
- Sweet Caroline, J Chimombe & Acid Band
- Munhu, 1984
- Mudzimu, J Chimombe & Acid band
- Zvingashure, J Chimombe & OK Success

== Death ==
Chimombe is suspected to have been HIV positive. He was loved by the people of Zimbabwe, especially people from Highfields, Chitungwiza, Harare and Bindura.
