= Mechanic Manyeruke and the Puritans =

Zimbabwean gospel music group

Mechanic Manyeruke and the Puritans are a Zimbabwean gospel music group.

Mechanic Manyeruke, the founder of the group (born 16 August 1942) is regarded as one of the top five notable gospel music pioneers in Zimbabwe.

Although Mechanic Manyeruke and the Puritans have changed members since the formation of the original group, they have managed to maintain their original music style and beat throughout their career.

Manyeruke's rhythm is his number 1 identity; he strums the guitar picking each string one at a time. The National broadcasters call Mechanic Manyeruke, Baba Manyeruke because of his fatherly behaviour.

== Biography ==
Mechanic Manyeruke is of the Mutuke Clan and his biographic details are as recorded in Pindula

=== Family ===
He is married to Helena. His first wife Zvanakireni Matsivo deacesed a mother of two. He then married Mattie Charachera Dzemwa who bore three children.

He is father to Emmanuel "Guspy Warrior" Manyeruke, a popular Zim Dancehall artist. They live in Zengeza, Chitungwiza in the Harare Metropolitan Province and in Chikutubwe about 20 km east of his place of birth.

=== Early life and education ===
Joseph Magundwane known as Mechanic Manyeruke was born on 16 August 1942 at St. Patrick's Mission in Gweru rural, in Midlands Province in Zimbabwe.

The nickname given him by his second eldest brother because he liked toying around with all sorts of metallic junk he got hold of. Manyeruke was his uncle who looked after him following his father's death. His official name became Mechanic Manyeruke.

Manyeruke is one of eleven children of Magudwane Mapwanyire and Hakuna Chihoko Mbano of Chiundura near Gweru. His father was a singer and dancer at traditional gatherings and festivals, specializing in Mhande dance and songs.

His passion for music started at St Patrick's, Chiundura Tribal Trust Land (TTL) near Gwelo where he grew up and did most of his education. He learned to play the banjo during school holidays.

He was still a child in school when his father died, and none of his older brothers could pay for his school fees to further his education. The brothers were employed in various farms and informal factories and they did not earn much. Manyeruke went to look for a job and eventually moved to Salisbury, now Harare, as a young man.

In Harare. he was first employed as a gardener, then later worked at a Removal Transporter, sold ice cream, painted buildings and much later found a formal job as a waiter.

One day an elderly Christian Soldier from the Salvation Army invited him to come to church. He did not realize that this was the beginning of his service in the Salvation Army. The first church service he attended was at an under-the-tree out-door church gathering. Then, the next weekend the church service was held at the Borrowdale Race Course, and the Salvation Army instruments stole his heart. He joined the Salvation army in 1968, and developed his skills as a musician there.

Following a performance in Dzivarasekwa Township, Salisbury the Salvation Army divisional songster leader, Jonah Matswetu drafted Manyeruke into his band, the Peace Makers.

Manyeruke started as a secular musician and recorded his first 7-inch single in the 1970s well before the formation of the Puritans Backing Group. He released his first solo single, Mwana Muparadzi The Prodigal Son, and the flip side was Kufa hakuna member _Death knows no celebrities' status_ in 1976, which was a flop because gospel music was not popular then. You could hardly hear a single gospel tune over the radio throughout the whole week.

== Recordings and productions ==
Manyeruke started recording in 1973 and never looked back since then.

For years Manyeruke had been pushing for the recognition of his music without much success. In 1984 he put in place the Puritans and re-recorded, and released his 1973 song Chirema Mutembere . The single did well though not as satisfactory as the gospel musician had anticipated.

By now Manyeruke was no longer a gardener but a scullion at Anglo-American Corporation where he was eventually upgraded to a special waiter for top management.

He recorded his first album with the Four Brothers, a secular music group that was good at backing up-coming musicians.

== Musical career ==
For quite a long time, gospel music was marginalized but Manyeruke and a few more Gospel music artists persisted in the then not so lucrative industry.

Jordan Chataika and Manyeruke teamed up in a live duet at the then African Service of the Rhodesia Broadcasting Corporation, now the Voice of Zimbabwe Radio, to mark the Easter celebrations in 1977. The opportunity opened doors for Manyeruke. RBC had heard him and some of the presenters like Sam Sibanda liked his strumming of the guitar. Manyeruke was a pioneer for the acceptance and influence of Gospel music in Zimbabwe.

Manyeruke's drive towards recording was almost put off when the then Teal Records, (now Gramma Records), was not sure of the commercial success of Zakeyo, his maiden album. Bothwell Nyamhondera, the sound engineer at Teal Records, however fought hard to convince Abinel Mapfumo, the studio A&R chief, that the Zakeyo project would be successful.

The Puritans were formed after independence with the likes Leniah Chari and Lucia from Mabvuku and one other girl

By then Manyeruke had set an electric guitar to the accompaniment of a keyboard and two female voices: these were the Puritans.

Craig Harris, in the All Music Guide, said Manyeruke's 1986 album had "haunting beauty melodies which are unforgettable".

== Discography ==
Mechanic Manyeruke and the Puritans released 25 albums over 40 years including

- Siyabonga Baba
- Ndeyeiko Nyaya
- Varombo Pamweya
- Mwari Ishe Wazvose

== Projects ==
Mechanic Manyeruke has been engaged in projects of which only the international ones are recorded. Manyeruke has also featured locally of state run functions and festivals. He has toured a number of international destinations with Gospel music

== Awards ==
Manyeruke was honoured with a brand new Jaguar XF which was supposed to be delivered to him on 19 December 2013 but the prize has not been delivered yet.

== See also ==
- Gospel Music in Zimbabwe
- St Peter's_ Hove Township, Zhombe East
- List of Zimbabweans Musicians

== Notes ==
- DailyNews "What makes his career an outstanding one is the fact that it has not been driven by the love for commercial success or glitzy life. Manyeruke does not live a glamorous life and there is no evidence to suggest he has made a huge wind fall from his music. Instead, he has been living happily in the shadows of some of the gospel stars he mentored."http://www.dailynews.co.zw/articles/2013/11/14/manyeruke-a-reason-to-celebrate
- allAfrica.com_ By Tinashe Sibanda. Manyeruke said he was honoured to receive such an award and said musicians today were blessed as they did not have to go through the wall of convincing producers and record labels that people want to listen to gospel music.... He said people like himself, Jordan Chataika and Freedom Sengwayo among others had had a tough time just asking for that opportunity.
