= Music of Zimbabwe =

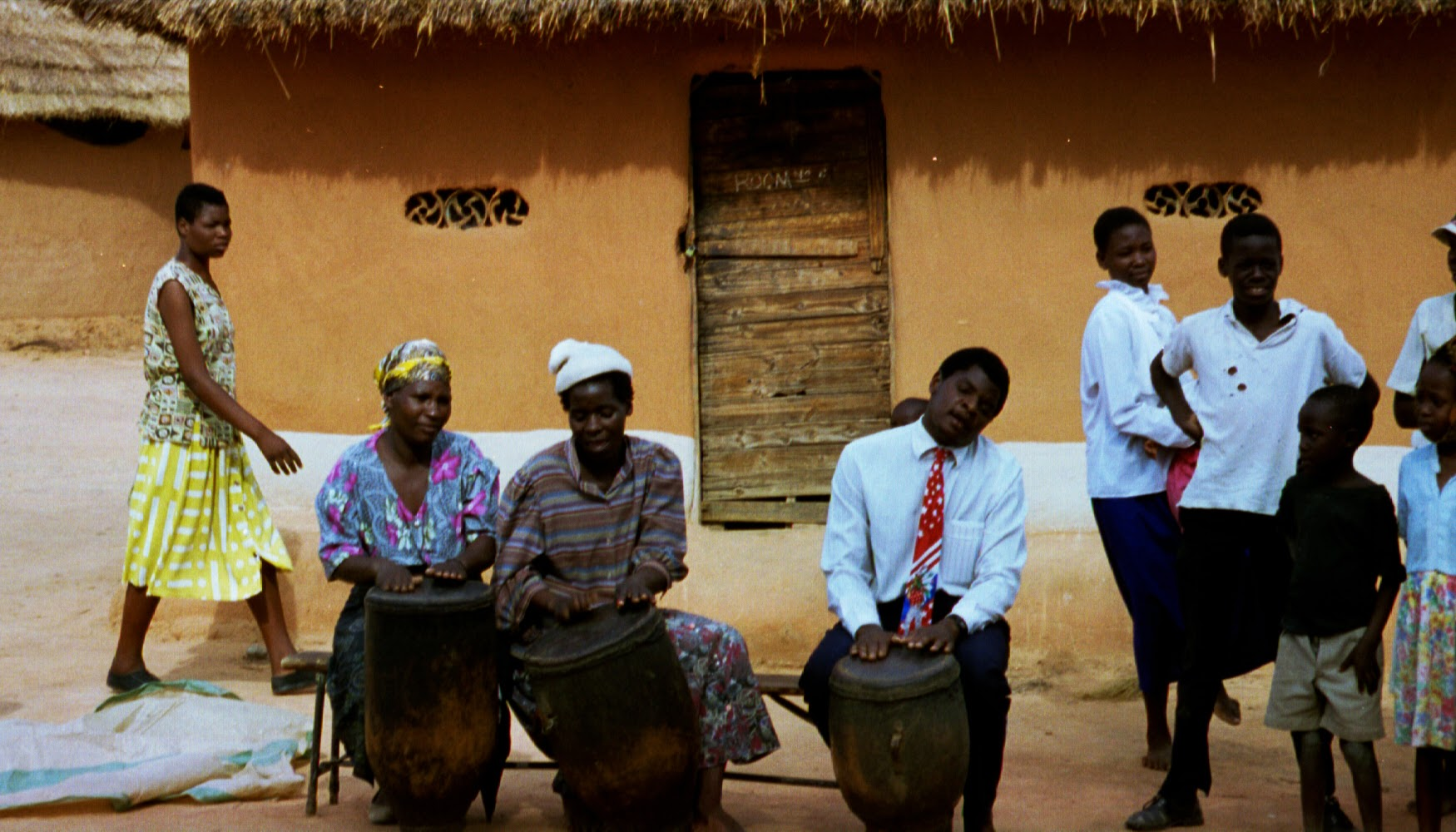
Ngoma drums in Zimbabwe

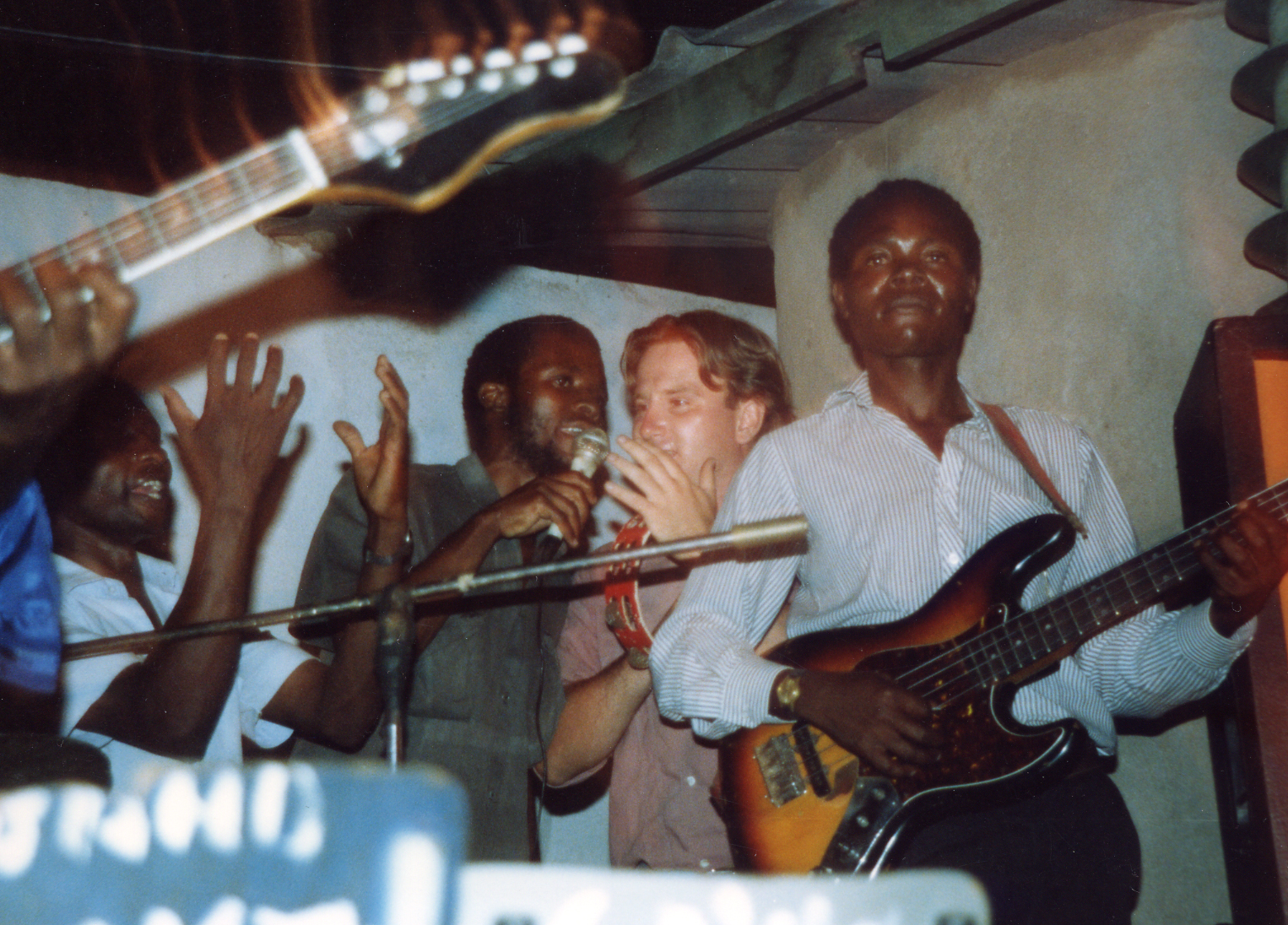
Musicians playing Zimbabwean pop music, Mberengwa, 2005

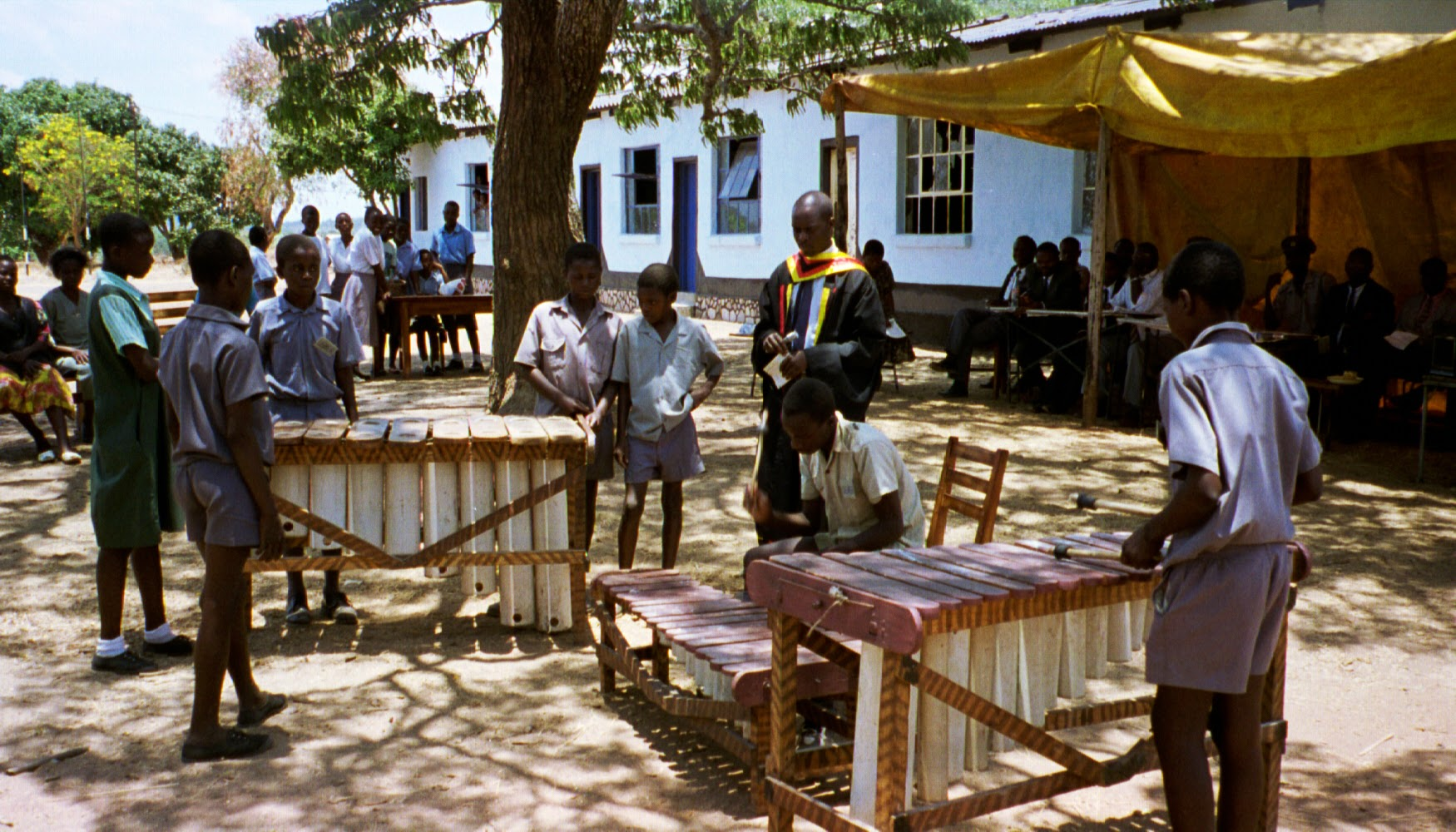
Zimbabwean primary school students playing marimbas

Zimbabwean music is heavily reliant on the use of instruments such as the mbira, Ngoma drums and hosho. Their music symbolizes much more than a simple rhythm, as the folk and pop style styled music was used as a symbol of hope for Zimbabweans looking to gain independence from Rhodesia. Music has played a significant role in the history of Zimbabwe, from a vital role in the traditional Bira ceremony used to call on ancestral spirits, to protest songs during the struggle for independence. The community in Zimbabwe used music to voice their resistance to their oppression, as one of the only weapons they had available to fight back with. In the 1980s, the Music of Zimbabwe was at the centre of the African Music scene thanks to genres such as Sungura and Jit. However, several performers were banned by state TV and radio leading to the closure of several music venues.

== Musical Genres ==
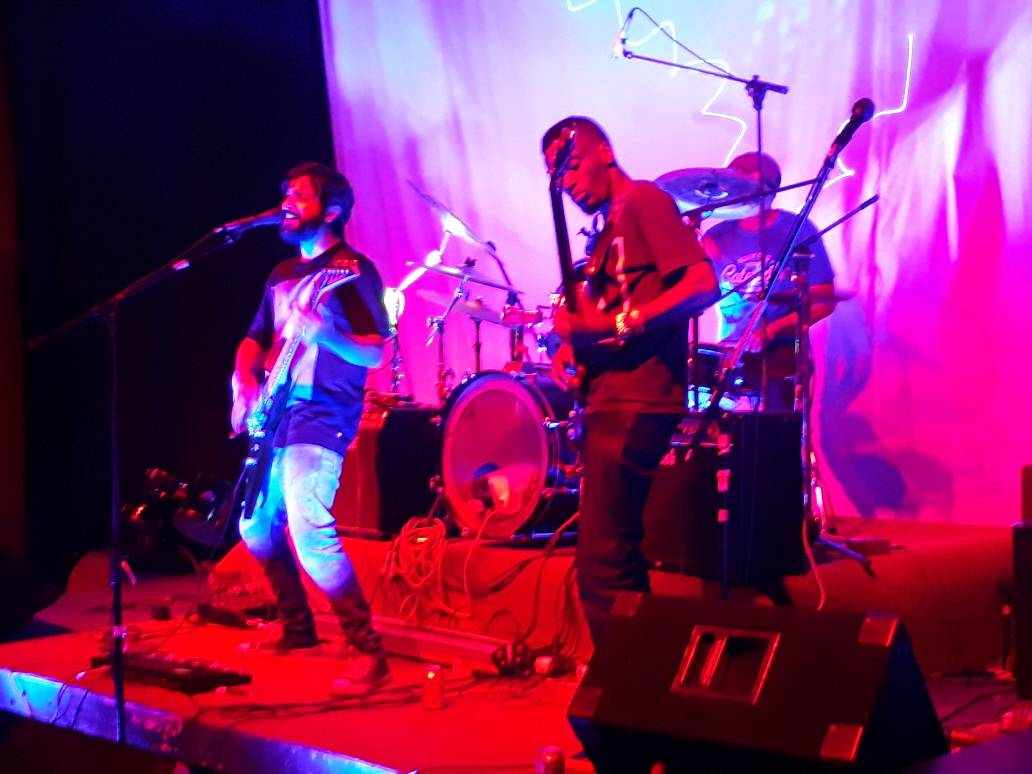
Digvijay Bhonsale with Denzil Thandabani & Justin Soutter from Evicted band, performing at the Zimbabwean edition of the '2018 Metal United World Wide' concert at the Reps Theatre in Harare

=== Rock ===
Some famous Zimbabwean rock bands are - Dividing The Element, Curfew At Midnight, Evicted, Flying Bantu and Chikwata-263.

=== Sungura ===
Sungura is the most popular musical genre in Zimbabwe. It emerged in 1953, in a time when regional identity was in formation. This is the local genre of the Zimbabwe music industry. Sungura music became popular in the early 1980s, pioneered by frontman Ephraim Joe and his band Sungura Boys which counted many notable future hit makers as members. Their roll included John Chibadura (guitar), Simon Chimbetu (guitar and vocals), Naison Chimbetu, Ronnie Gatakata, Michel Jambo (drums), Ephraim Joe (guitar), Moses Marasha (bass), Never Moyo (lead guitar), Bata Sinfirio (rhythm guitar), System Tazvida (guitar and vocals).

The Khiama Boys emerged as natural successors to the Sungura Boys after their demise during the mid-eighties. Members would include System Tazvida (Rhythm guitar), Cephas Karushanga (Vocals & Lead Guitar), Nicholas Zacharia (Rhythm at the time & Lead guitar), Alick Macheso (Bass), Silas Chakanyuka (Drums) and Zakaria Zakaria (Rhythm & Sub-Rhythm guitar). A great number of these artistes have gone on to forge successful careers with their own bands whilst Nicholas Zacharia has remained as the leader of the band and was active until 2025, when he died.

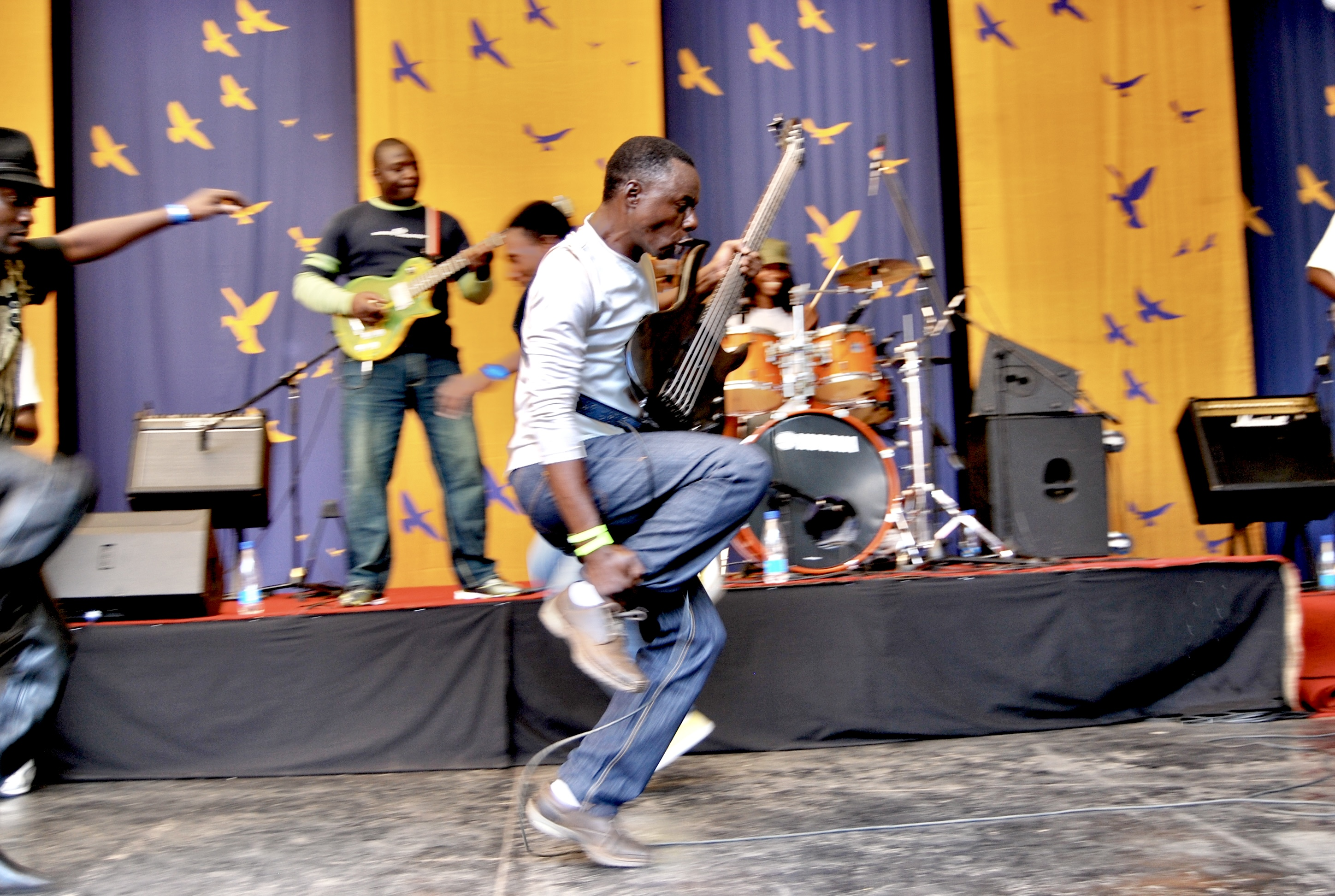
Alick Macheso performing in 2012

James Chimombe, whose romantic ballads and the influential sungura guitar melody (consisting of lead, rhythm and bass), made him a favorite in the late 80s. Other notable artists include Zexie Manatsa, Tinei Chikupo, Paul Matavire, Zvishavane Sounds and Jonah Moyo's Devera Ngwena, among others.

The 90s decade was dominated by musicians such as Leonard Dembo, the effervescent Khiama Boys, veteran Simon Chimbetu and then upcoming artistes Alick Macheso, Tongai Moyo and Somandla Ndebele. One of the stars of the decade was Leonard Zhakata, whose musical project was a spinoff of the double play Maungwe Brothers, an act fronted by Zhakata and his cousin Thomas Makion. Other popular acts included Pengaudzoke, the Wrist Brothers, Zimbabwe Chachacha Kings, Aaron Chinamira, King Pharao, Hosiah Chipanga, Stabien Mawire and Paul Mpofu, to mention a few. The decade 2000 till present has been characterised by a wrangle for the crown for the kingship of Sungura between the two most prominent Sungura musicians of the decade, Alick Macheso and Tongai Moyo. Having dominated sales, tour and concert attendances, the heckling and counter-heckling by the artists at shows and in some recorded material is strong proof of their feud akin to the BIG vs Tupac in American '90s hip hop.

Other artists to come through this decade include Joseph Garakara, Suluman Chimbetu (son of Simon), Allan Chimbetu (Simon's brother), Tryson Chimbetu (Naison's son), Cephas Mashakada, Gift Amuli, Howard and Tatenda Pinjisi, First Farai as well as Josphat and Daiton Somanje, the Pengaudzoke frontmen who were pursuing solo careers. Alick Macheso has largely dominated the scene, creating popular dance choreographies such as 'Borrowdale', Razor Wire, zoraaa butter, femba bute and kedebu, which mimic everyday routines in Zimbabwean life. A new generation of Sungura artists is emerging, largely influenced by Macheso's distinct style of a leading bass guitar. This generation includes artists like Mark Ngwazi, Tendai Ngwazi, Peter Moyo (son of Tongai), Simon Mutambi, Romeo Gasa, Sugar Sugar, Jacob Moyana and Francis 'Slomo' Dhaka among others. The genre is increasingly getting international recognition with some non-natives trying it out. Notable among these are Eirik Hoff Walmsiness 'Eriki' from Norway and Indian Dhyaan Kumar.

System Tazvida, Simon Chimbetu, James Chimombe, Tongai Moyo, Paul Matavire, John Chibadura, Leonard Dembo, and Thomas Makion have all died. It's also worth noting that a new wave of Sungura, dubbed Trap Sungura, has emerged in Zimbabwe, fueled by Tanto Wavie.

=== Imbube ===
Imbube was created by Zimbabweans while they were still technically a part of Rhodesian culture. This genre consisted of male singers in an acapella style, which differed from most of the typical music at the time that was formed around unique instruments. During this time period, many of the Zimbabwe men worked in mines for long hours. They formed Imbube by singing along together as a means of passing the time. The vocals coming from the caves echoed to produce better quality, and encouraged the men to continue singing these happy tunes. Occasionally the miners would sing songs of social justice, but a majority were generally happy and used as entertainment.

=== Jit ===
Jit, also known as Harare beat, is a generic term for electric guitar-driven pop, and includes popular acts like the New Black Eagles, Mike Mopo and the Four Brothers (a band UK radio DJ John Peel described as "the best live band in the world"). Internationally, The Bhundu Boys are by far the best-known jit performers, and have worked with numerous American and British musicians. Notable recent bands to come up with the Jit sound are Nehoreka who fuse the traditional Jit with funk sounds, there is also Mokoomba and Q Montana. The 1990 film Jit was named for this style.

=== Afro jazz (Zimbabwean jazz) ===
Zimbabwean jazz, also known as Afro Jazz, is Zimbabwean music influenced by a style of township rhythm that evolved in a Southern part of Africa over the last century. One can also trace similarities from Kwela, a pennywhistle-based, street music from the southern part of Africa with jazzy underpinnings and a distinctive, skiffle-like beat. It is also closely related to Marabi which was the name given to a keyboard style (often using cheap pedal organs) that had a musical link to American jazz, ragtime and blues, with roots deep in the African tradition. Early marabi musicians were part of an underground musical culture and were typically not recorded. An example of such an artist in the early 1940s is August Musarurwa of the Skokiaan fame. It has continued to develop and traits of this music can be seen in the works of his grandson, Prince Kudakwashe Musarurwa.

The Pakare Paye Centre has worked for spreading Zimbabwean Jazz to young musicians since 2004, founded by Afro-Jazz musician Oliver Mtukudzi.

=== Chimurenga music ===
Chimurenga music is a genre developed by Thomas Mapfumo named for the Shona language word for struggle. Mapfumo and his band, the Blacks Unlimited developed a style of music based on traditional mbira music, but played with modern electric instrumentation, with lyrics characterized by social and political commentary. Mapfumo's music was a "tool of the liberation war" criticizing the Rhodesian government of Ian Smith, but shifted after independence to speaking out about perceived corruption and mismanagement of the Zimbabwean government of Robert Mugabe.

=== Tuku Music ===
Tuku Mtukudzi was a prolific recorder who also appeared in films like Jit. He played in a plethora of styles, and was known for penetrating lyrics; for example, he wrote a second song about AIDS in Zimbabwe after Paul Matavire's hit song "Yakauya AIDS iriko".

=== Zimdancehall ===
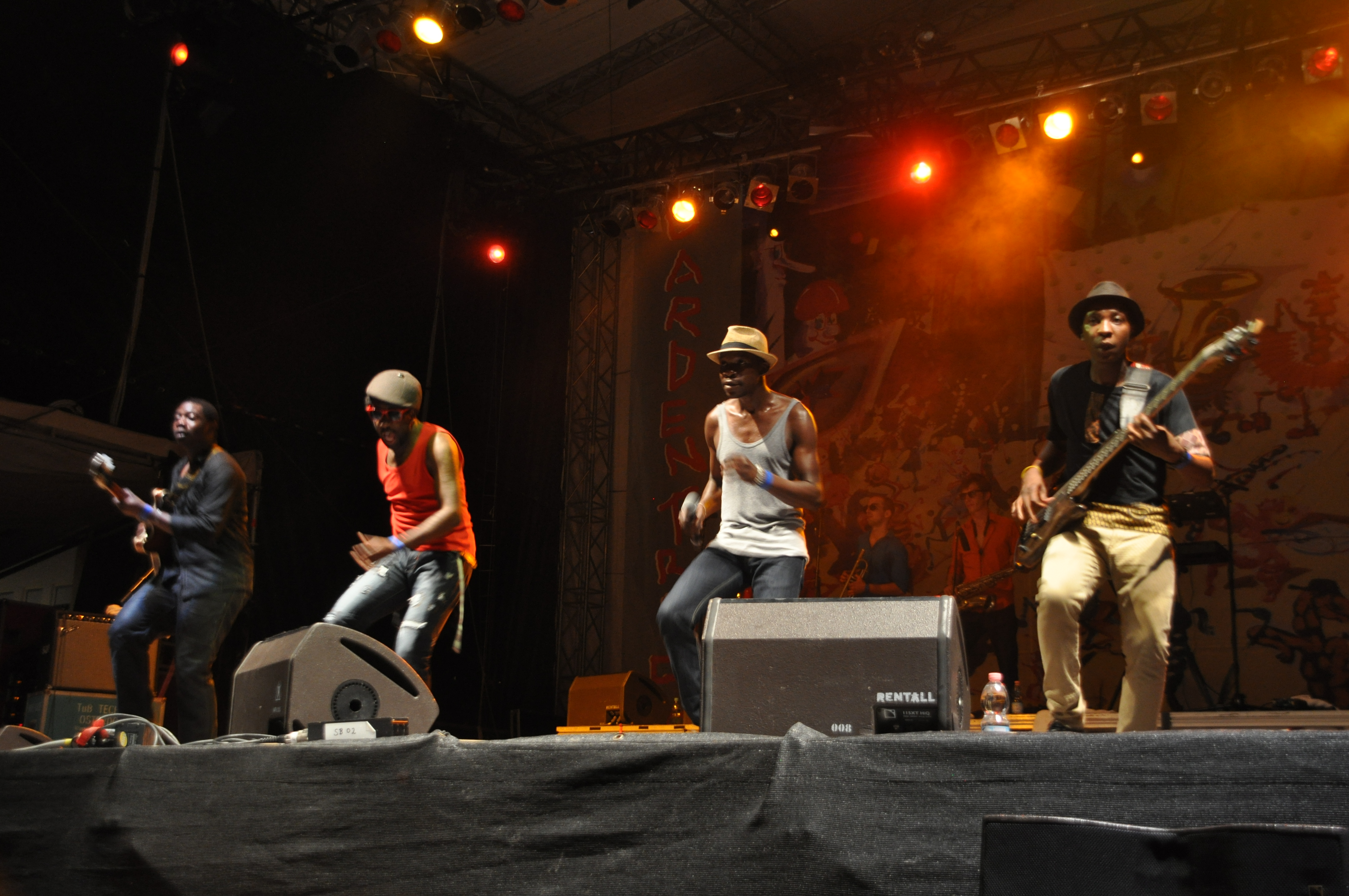
Mokoomba at the music festival "Bardentreffen" 2013 in Nuremberg, Germany

Zimdancehall is Zimbabwean music influenced by Jamaican dancehall music, it is also known as Mangoma. There is frequent debate around the origin Zimdancehall within Zimbabwe. Notable Zimdancehall performers include Winky D and Soul Jah love.

=== Rumba ===
African Rumba, or 'Soukos' is mostly associated with the Democratic Republic of the Congo but its popularity has inspired Zimbabwe's own brand of rumba in musicians such as Simon Chimbetu, Papa Jose and Leonard Karikoga Zhakata. Soukos has been an influence on other artists such as The R.U.N.N. family.

=== Gospel ===
Gospel music became popular in Zimbabwe in the late 1980s. Jonathan Wutawunashe has been described as "Zimbabwe's first real gospel star". Other population musicians in this genre include Jordan Chataika, Freedom Sengwayo, Mechanic Manyeruke, and Brian Sibalo.

The early nineties saw the rising of new gospel stars in the mold of Ivy Kombo - Moyo and Carol Mujokoro of the EGEA gospel Train whose debut album Mufudzi Wangu was released in 1993 and contains tracks such as "Be Thou My Vision", "Ndotarisa Kumakomo" and "Utiziro" among others. The two went on to pursue successful solo musical careers and released "Ndaidziwanepi Nyasha" and "Ropa RaJesu" as their debut solo albums respectively.

Gospel artists who emerged from the mid nineties include Pastor Haisa (Lawrence Haisa), Brother Sam with his hits "Makanaka Jesu" and "Cherechedza", Elias Musakwa, Rita Shonhiwa, The Gospel Trumpet of the "Rose Of Sharon" fame and Shingisai Suluma who only became popular in the early 21st century with the hit song "Mirira Mangwanani"; though she first recorded in the nineties.

In the late-nineties, Charles Charamba, a rising artist, grew in popularity, and currently holds gospel sales records. His music became popular into the first decade of the 21st century, most likely due to his Sungura-based contemporary style.

In the early 21st century, a lot of gospel artists also recorded, though a few really rose to stardom. These include Fungisai Zvakavapano - Mashavave who has risen to become the most dominant female gospel musician in the current era, Stanley Gwanzura (Pastor Gee), Kudzai Nyakudya, Tembalami, and gospel a cappella outfits like Vabati VaJehovah and Shower Power.

== Instruments ==
=== Mbira ===
The mbira is an integral part of Zimbabwean music. Classified by musicologists as a lamellaphone, part of the plucked idiophone family, it is created from things found in nature such as a wooden board (often fitted with a resonator) and tines. It is frequently played in a deze (calabash resonator) which amplifies the sound and augments using shells or bottle caps placed around the edges. Often accompanied by the hosho, a percussion instrument, the mbira is often an important instrument that people play at religious ceremonies, weddings, and other social gatherings. The mbira plays a central role in the traditional Bira ceremony used to call on ancestral spirits.

The instrument is a central piece in their religious rituals. The most important function of mbira is the idea of it being a "telephone to the spirits" during ceremonies. It is the sole way of communication between the living and deceased ancestors, ancient tribal guardians, or guardian spirits. The mbira is required to ask these spirits to bring rain during drought, stop rain during floods, accept their offerings, ask for forgiveness, and bring clouds when crops are damaged by the sun. These instruments were made from resources from the land which connected them further connects the indigenous people to their land and this deep connection has helped communities in Zimbabwe to continue their tradition of mbira music despite the development of colonialism.

The sound made by this instrument closely imitates the noises made by rain or running water with rich and vibrant tones "like bells". The sound has a special presence; one that feel the music as much as one hears it. Penetrating and warming at the same time, immediately capturing the involvement of the listeners and drawing them into its mood. The pieces of music played vary by the artist but there is no specific way to play this instrument. The music performed is all about elaboration and variation supporting creative expression of the performer.

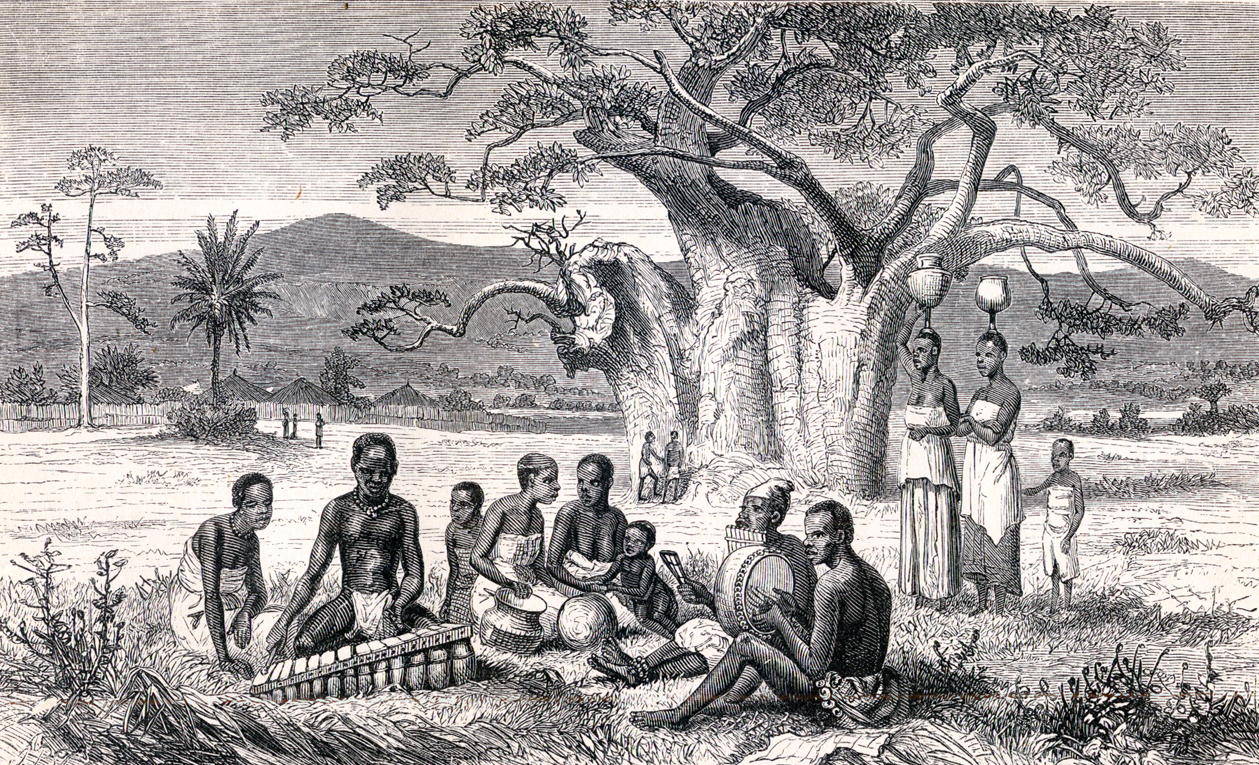
Mbira player with other musicians from 1865 book

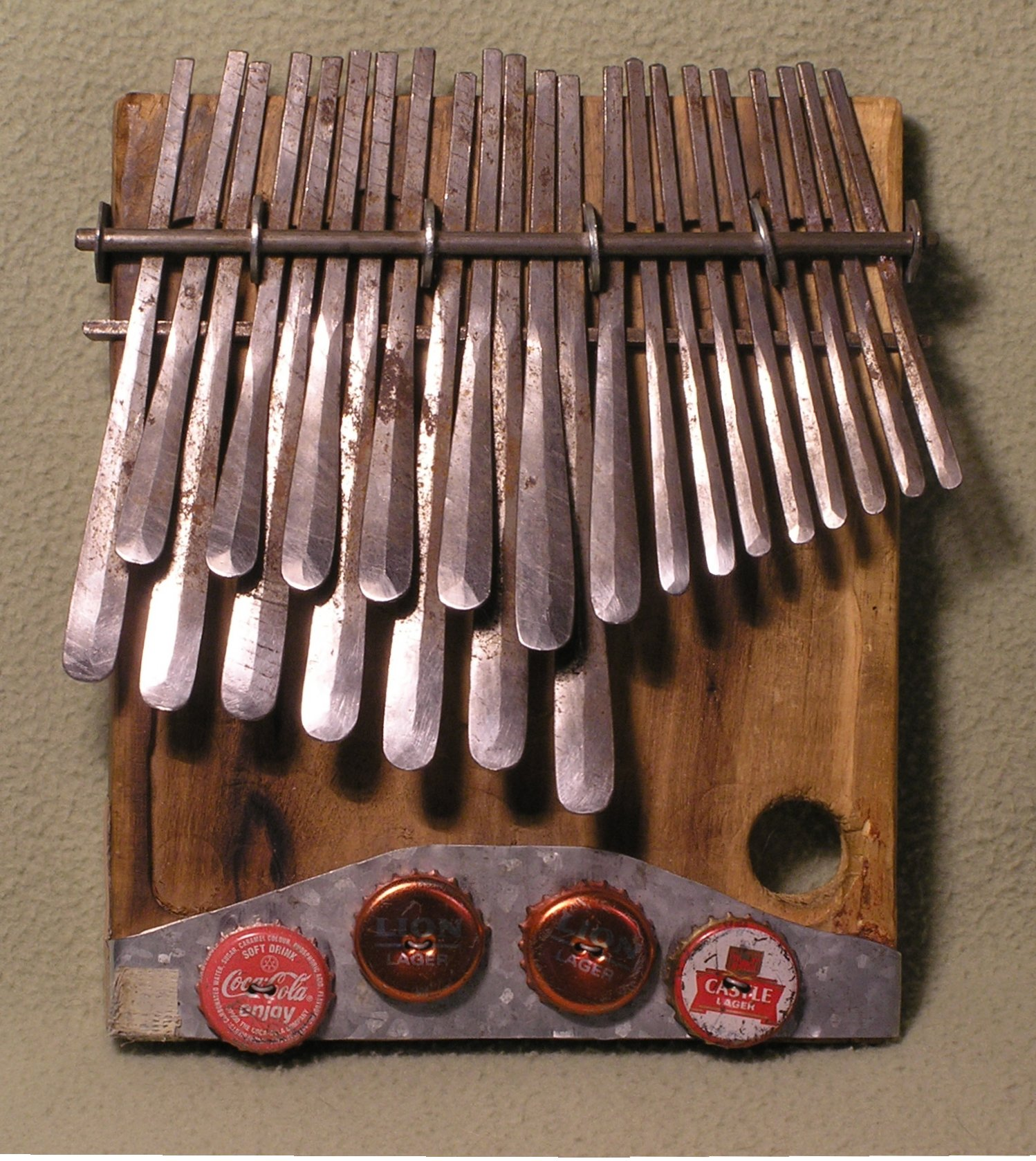
Mbira dzavadzimu

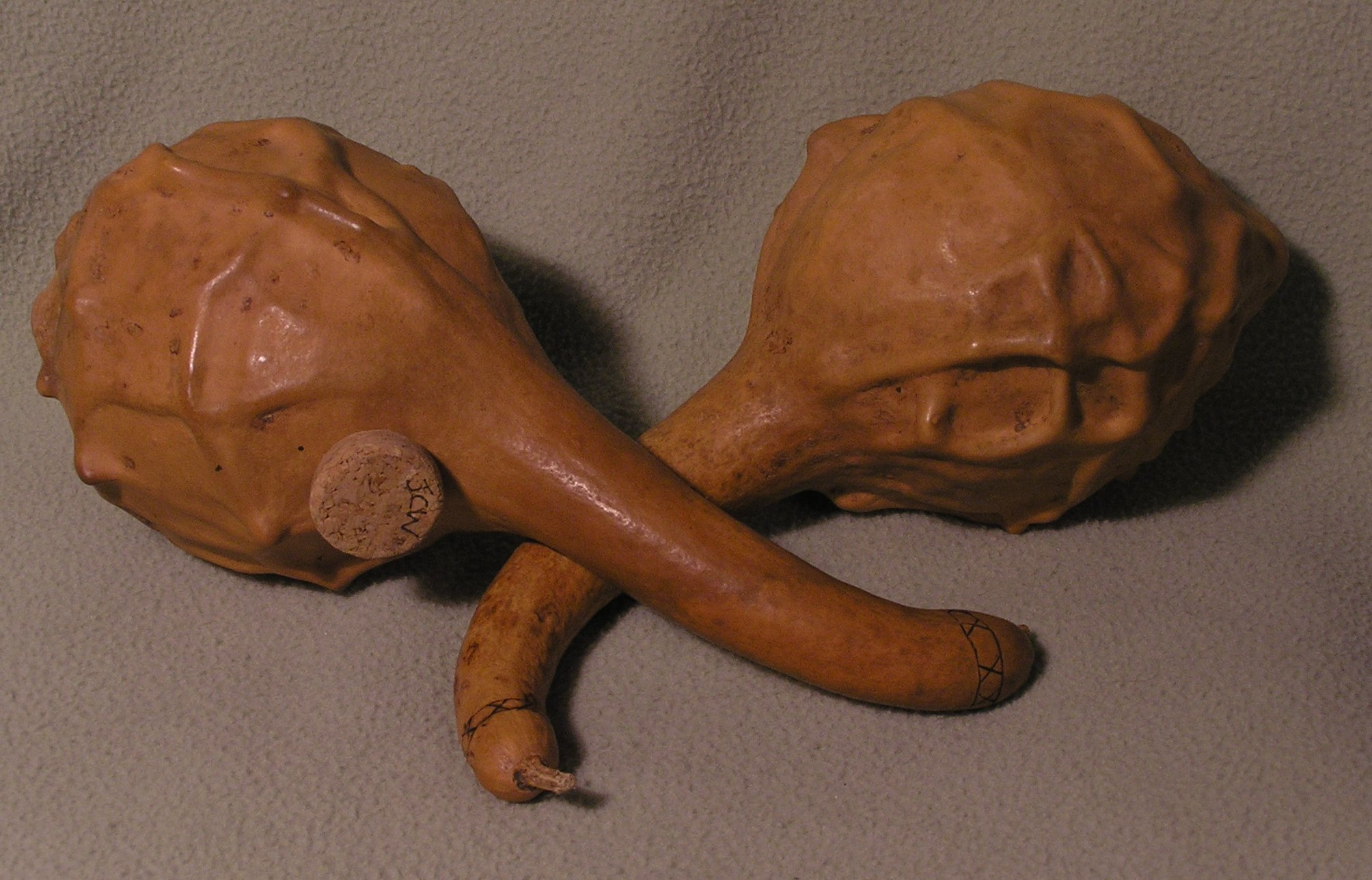
Hosho commonly used to accompany mbira music

Though musicologist Hugh Tracey believed the mbira to be nearing extinction in the 1930s, the instrument has been revived since the 60s and 70s, and has gained an international following through the world music scene. Some renowned mbira players include Dumisani Maraire, Ephat Mujuru, Stella Chiweshe, Chartwell Dutiro, Mbuya Dyoko, Cosmas Magaya, Tute Chigamba, Forward Kwenda, and Chiwoniso Maraire.

There is also pop music in Zimbabwe and around the world that incorporates Zimbabwean indigenous instruments. For example, mbira player Chris Berry with his band Panjea have reached platinum record sales in Zimbabwe and Mozambique, playing a style of music based on traditional mbira rhythms and melodies, but incorporating various other instruments and styles (like hip-hop and dancehall). Thomas Mapfumo is widely credited with popularizing his genre of Chimurenga music, which includes guitar, drums, Western-style vocals, and mbira in the same band. Mapfumo is also famous for his arrangement of traditional mbira lines to be played on the electric guitar. Mbira is incorporated into the music of critically acclaimed American hip-hop duo Shabazz Palaces by Tendai Maraire (son of traditional mbira player Dumisani Maraire).

=== Marimba ===
The marimba was introduced in Zimbabwean Music during the early 1960s when the Kwanongoma College of African Music in Bulawayo adopted it. Founders of the college considered that marimba could boost the musical development of the country, and design a model that it's now known as Kwanongoma marimba. Zimbabwean marimba or Kwanongoma marimba is now considered part of the Zimbabwean culture.

The first Zimbabwean marimba was built by Nelson Jones in 1962. However, the wood used was too soft. The next year, Josiah Siyembe Mathe started using a Lozi instrument called Selimba, common in the southwest of Zambia. The original Selimba was an 11-key instrument. Mathe built later a soprano, a tenor, and a bass. using Mukwa wood for the keys.

Michael Bhule built the first set of Kwanongoma marimba. Alport Mhlanga composed the first repertoire for the instrument.

=== Other instruments ===
The Ngororombe, a variety of panflute made from tuned bamboo tubes, is used in northeastern Zimbabwe, often accompanied by percussion such as hosho, leg rattles, and drums.

== Bulawayo ==
The Ndebele-dominated region of the southwest of Zimbabwe, including the city Bulawayo, has been instrumental in the development of Zimbabwean music. Seminal 1950s guitarist George Sibanda had a following across Africa and was the writer for the hit song Guabi Guabi which is sung all over the world, and Dorothy Masuka was a major player on the South African jazz scene, for example. Among the most popular performers of the region within Zimbabwe, however, was 1980s Ndebele pop sensation Lovemore Majaivana. Ndebele musicians who are active are Black Umfolosi, Insingizi Majahawodwa Ndlovu, Sandra Ndebele, Lwazi Tshabangu, Kuxxman, Go Boyz, Achuzi, Beatar Mangethe, Vusa Mkhaya, Afrika Revenge and Ramadu. The marginalisation of Bulawayo artists in Zimbabwe saw the influence of South African music dominating hence the emergence of kwaito music in Bulawayo pioneered by Go-Boyz in 1996 and more groups like GTI, Achuzi, Amagangsters, artists like Cal Vin etc., emerged. A brand of Jazz was created in Bulawayo, in the 1940s and 1950s, and was made popular by August Musarurwa with his African Dance Band of the Cold Storage Commission of Southern Rhodesia. He recorded the legendary song Sikokiana which went on to be recorded in USA by Louis Armstrong and many others.

== Lyrics ==
Zimbabwean musicians' lyrics mostly contain encouragement of upholding good social values in the family and society as whole. Such lyrics can be seen in songs by artists like Oliver Mtukudzi, Simon Chimbetu and Suluman Chimbetu the Harare 10-piece Afro-fusion band Nehoreka, Louis Mhlanga, John Chibadura, Steve Makoni, and Bhundu Boys. However, the lyrics of Thomas Mapfumo are political, praising just leadership and encouraging rising up against bad governance. Many of his albums are named after a word meaning uprising or war of liberation: Chimurenga. His music earned him the wrath of the ZANU-PF government resulting in the banning of most of his music on state owned radio and TV. Another musician with striking lyrics is the late System Tazvida of the Chazezesa Challengers. His lyrics were mostly centered on love and relationships, with songs like Anodyiwa Haataure, Ukarambwa Usachema, Vanotipedzera Mashoko and Dai Hanzvadzi Yairoorwa, with which he achieved popularity. With the emergence of the Urban Grooves-style, the content of lyrics shifted to more closely resemble that of American RnB, Hip Hop and Pop music. These have garnered a following among a younger generation of Zimbabweans. One artist, Maskiri, is known for imitating Eminem's style of controversial lyrics.

== Urban Grooves ==
Coming on the music scene in the late 1990s and early 2000s, Urban Grooves takes in American Rap, Hip Hop, R&B, Soul and other international music genres, often melded with traditional Zimbabwean music.

Artists such as Sanii Makhalima, Alexio Kawara, Roy and Royce, David Chifunyise, Leonard Mapfumo, Roki, Stach, Betty Makaya, Extra Large, Maskiri, Kactus and Nehoreka laid the groundwork for the new genre, which gained increasing popularity among the youth. The style was helped by the 100% local content policy in effect at the time, which required all radio stations to play only music by Zimbabwean artists.

A second generation of artists such as Trevor Dongo, Drum Dada, Q Montana, Mokoomba and Nehoreka have come to prominence more recently.

== See also ==
- Paul Berliner
- International Library of African Music
- Makwayera
- Zimbabwean Marimba
- Mbira
- Shona music
- Hugh Tracey
- List of Zimbabwean musicians
- Zimbabwean hip hop
