= System Tazvida =

Zimbabwean musician (1968–1999)

- Also known as: King of Chitungwiza
- Born: Funuel Tazvida; 1968
- Origin: Chitungwiza, Harare, Zimbabwe
- Died: 4 February 1999
- Genre: Sungura
- Occupations: singer, songwriter
- Years active: 1988–1998
- Label: Gramma
- Formerly of: Chazezesa Challengers

Funuel Nyasha Tazvida, best known as System Tazvida, was a Zimbabwean musician born on 2 May 1968 in Zaka Masvingo (Fort Victoria ) during the Rhodesia era of modern day Zimbabwe, who was very popular in his home country mainly in the 1990s, though not as well known internationally. System Tazvidas music was sung more in a satirical manner but was very pregnant with meaning; by his lyrics he acted as a social commentator on various issues that affect people in their day to day living. Tazvida wrote and performed songs mainly in his native Shona language.

The song which put him in the limelight was Mabhauwa, which he sang together with the band Khiama Boys; System Tazvida was on vocals. This song used to be played in nightclubs of Zimbabwe and all kinds of places such as pubs.

Tazvida was best known for his hits Anodyiwa Haataure and Mushandi Ndimambo. However, it was his 1993 hit Rudo Tsika Nemagariro which propelled him to national stardom.

Tazvida had played with various bands including the Khiama Boys, the Mabhauwa Express and the Sungura Boys before he formed the Chazezesa Challengers. The Challengers included his brothers Peter Tazvida on bass and Isaac Tazvida on backing vocals, Lucky Mumiriki on rhythm (a former member of Nyami Nyami Sounds, Hurungwe Sounds and the Sungura Boys), Roggers Fatiya (a former member of Titus Zihute) on drums and his young brother Last Fatiya, who also played with Titus Zihute, was on lead guitar. Guitarist LeeRoy Lunga, who had played with the Super Sounds and the Kasongo Band, joined the Chazezesa Challengers in 1997 after the hit Anodyiwa Haataure. In 1997 Roggers Fatiya, Last Fatiya and young Tazvida, Isaac Tazvida left the group; then Roy Lunga became the lead guitarist and backing vocalist.

The band blended elements of sungura, jazz, South African mbaqanga and traditional music. They recorded several successful albums in the mid-to-late 1990s, their first being Rudo Tsika Nemagariro, which sold more than 20,000 copies. Their album Mutunhu Unemago sold more than 30,000 copies. Popular songs included Anodyiwa Haature, Mabhauwa, and Vaforomani. The Chazezesa Challengers were also popular in Mozambique, and toured there.

The band experienced two deaths in quick succession, as drummer Wezhira Shoko and talismanic leader System Tazvida both died near the turn of the millennium. The group has continued without System and Wezhira. Since their deaths they have produced three albums, including the tribute record Panopfungaira Pane Moto in honour of their former leader. The band assumed a new name, Boyz dzeSmoko, in which "Smoko" is an acronym for "simple music of Kanindo origin", the name Tazvida gave to his style of music. System's successor and younger brother Peter died in 2002. The group continued under the leadership of Lee Roy Lunga and released their twelfth album, Smoko Pachena/Chabvondoka, in December 2002.

His influence has led to the remaking of some of his popular hits, with the notable popularity of Chindidawo, a remake of Babe Rakanaka, done by rising Zimbabwean artist and producer Casper Beatz.

System Tazvida was married to Barbara Mabuyaye, but nothing is known to most of the people whether he had children.

== Albums ==
- Rudo Tsika Nemagariro (1994)
- Mutunhu Unemago (1995)
- Wadenha Mago (1996)
- Watosvorwa (1997)
- Huni Nyoro Mumoto (1998)
- Rimi Remoto (1999)
- System Tazvida & Chazezesa Challengers Hits (2005)
- The Best of Tazvida Irombe Weshira Singles Collection (2006)
