= Nox Guni =

- Also known as: Nox, Zaka Prince, 1n Mhondoro
- Born: Enock Guni; September 6, 1983 (age 43); Masvingo, Zimbabwe
- Origin: Zimbabwean
- Genre: Afrobeats
- Occupations: Singer, songwriter
- Instruments: keyboards, acoustic guitar, marimba
- Years active: 2003–present

Nox Guni (born Enock Guni) is a Zimbabwean musician, performing artist, songwriter and producer based in South Africa. He is renowned for the musical movement in Zimbabwe of the early 2000s dubbed Urban Grooves.

== Background ==
Born Enock Guni on the 6th of September 1983 in Zaka, Masvingo in Zimbabwe, he made his debut as Nox with his first major hit "Iwe Maria" in 2002. He started his musical career in the same year when he was spotted by Roy and Royce, a celebrated duo at the time. His entry onto the music arena was through participation with SHAPE Zimbabwe projects leading to his recording of the first track "Iwe Maria". He studied Marketing with the Midlands State University.

Guni released his first full album title Wandipengesa in 2004 and has had several radio hits in his career which include Ndinonyara, Takafitana, WhatsApp, Uchandifunga, Melody. He has also worked on a number of projects in the region to include collaborations with South African Makhadzi, Mr. Brown, DJ Tira and Master KG.

In 2009, he released an album titled Music, Love and Me which featured the track Wandinoda. The track was singled out by Sony Music Africa and was to later be used as a soundtrack by MNET for the reality show Big Brother.

Guni has been part of the pioneering team of touring artists for the Urban Grooves genre from Zimbabwe. He is one of the few artists from that genre still perpetuating the art.

== Discography ==
=== Albums ===
- Wandipengesa
- Rhythm And Blues
- Chapter 3
- Music Love And Me
- Zim’s Finest
- Classic Love Songs
- 8th Wonder
- Africa's Best
- Ndingazodei E. P
- Ice and Roses
- The Surprise [2020]
- African Royalty
- Royal Alliances (2023)
- The Love Letter (2024)

== Awards ==
- National Arts Merit Awards Outstanding Song Of The Year 2013 - Ndinonyara (Nomination)
- National Arts Merit Awards Outstanding Male Artist Of The Year 2013 (Nomination)
- Zimbabwe Music Awards Male Artist Of The Year 2013
- Zimbabwe Music Awards Artist Of The Year 2013
- Zimbabwe Music Awards Best Touring Artist 2014
- Zawadiimbabwe Music Awards Video Of The Year 2015 - Zvandadiwa (Nomination)
- Star FM Music Awards Best Collaboration 2020 - Waimutambisa ft Freeman HKD
- Star FM Music Awards Best Song By Diaspora Artist 2020 - Im In Love
- Star FM Music Awards Best Afrobeat Song 2020 - Waimutambisa
- Star FM Music Awards Best Song By Diaspora Artist 2021 - Melody ft Master KG
