= Roy and Royce =

Roy and Royce is the Zimbabwean twin singing duo of Roy and Royce Gomo. They gained popularity during the Urban Grooves movement of Zimbabwe, and they have recorded under Galaxy Entertainment and their own label, Twin Peaks Recordings.

The twins took music lessons from form 1-4 at Gokomere High School and later recorded at Old International radio. They started off as a trio with their friend, Misheck Chikaka, in a group called ROMIRO. It was short-lived, however, and the twins and Chikaka went their separate ways.

The pair kicked off their music career with their hit "Handirege" in 2002, immediately followed by "Zuva Rangu". Both tracks reached number 1 on Zimbabwean music charts. They went on to release a full album entitled Gogogoi, which went on to produce three more hits, including the title track.

The duo's follow-up album from 2003, Tenda, with four hit songs.

== Discography ==
Recordings released by Roy & Royce
Date of Release	Title	Type
2002	Handirege	Single
2002	Gogogoi	Album
2003	Tenda	Album
2005	Ndimi	Album
2015	Zvoita Kunge	Single
2017	Hukama	Single
2021	Misodzi	Single
2021	Ungamuwudze	Single
2021	Ndewangu	Single

== Production ==
Works produced by Roy & Royce Gomo under Twin Peaks Recordings
Date of Release	Title	Artist(s)	Details
2004	New Discoveries	various	includes Nox Guni's first ever recording
2004	Paita Nyaya	Tambudzayi	
2005	Nyarara Zvako	Tambudzayi	
