= Makwayera =

African style of choral singing

Makwayera is an African style of choral singing that native Zimbabweans developed by combining elements of their traditional vocal music with the Western four-part harmony brought to the region by missionaries. It includes elements of call and response and a strong vocal leader.
