= Maskiri =

Zimbabwean Rapper, singer and songwriter

Maskiri also known as Skillaz, Tateguru
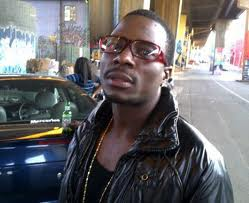

Background information
- Birth name: Alishias Musimbe
- Born: 6 April 1980 (age 45)
- Origin: Chitungwiza, Zimbabwe
- Genres: Zimbabwean hip hop, urban grooves, urban gwavha
- Years active: 2002–present
- Labels: Chamhembe, Independent (current)

Maskiri (born Alishias Musimbe on 6 April 1982) is a Zimbabwean rapper, singer and songwriter.

== Music videos ==
On Saturday 27 November 2010, Maskiri alongside fellow artist Nox Guni went on set to shoot visuals for "Wenera", Maskiri's first-ever music video which became top ZBC video of the year and won a NAMA. The video was directed by Chagwa Black and was shot on location in Pretoria, South Africa.
