= Leonard Dembo =

- Also known as: Musoro WeNyoka (lit. "Snake-Head")
- Born: Leonard Tazvivinga Dembomavara; 29 December 1959; Chivi District, Masvingo Province, Zimbabwe
- Died: 9 April 1996 (aged 36) Harare, Zimbabwe
- Genres: Sungura, adult contemporary
- Occupation: Musician
- Instrument: Treble Guitar
- Years active: 1982–1996

Leonard Tazvivinga Dembo, a.k.a. Kwangwari Gwaindepi also Musoro We Nyoka (born 29 December 1959 in Chivi – 9 April 1996), was a Zimbabwean guitar-band musician and member of the bands Barura Express and The Outsiders. Incorporating traditional Shona sayings in his lyrics, his musical style was sungura-based, played on electric guitars tuned to emulate the characteristic sounds of the mbira.

== Career ==
Leonard Dembo's most successful album, Chitekete, sold over 100,000 copies. The title song was used as the intro song for Angeline Musasiwa's Miss World World 1994 campaign in which she finished third.

== Death ==
Leonard Dembo died on 9 April 1996 at the age of 36.

== See also ==
- Music of Zimbabwe
- Shona language

== Discography ==
Albums

Mai Nevana Vavo	1984
1	Mai Nevana Vavo
2	Huya Tivake Imba
3	Shamwari
4	Linda
5	Dhiya Wangu Lovemore
6	Ziviso
7	Varaidzo
8	Seiko

Nhamo Moto	1985
1	Nhamo Moto
2	Ndisiyei Ndakadaro
3	Kudya Zvinonaka
4	Muchauya Here Gore Rino
5	Wada Ne N'anga
6	Tezvara
7	Chiiko Chinokunetsa
8	Ruchiva

Kuziva Mbuya Huudzwa	1986
1	Kuziva Mbuya Huudzwa
2	Manager
3	Kufa Vachitambura
4	Dai Wadzoka
5	Murambiwa
6	Zuva Randakadana Newe
7	Edhina
8	Chiri Mberi Mutoro Wamambo

Sharai	1987
1	Areta
2	Dai Mandizarurirawo
3	Musingure
4	Mwana Wangu Igoridhe
5	Sharai
6	Vakakurera Vakuru

Kukura Kwedu	1988
1	Kukura Kwedu
2	Kusatenda Huroyi
3	Vamwene Ne Muroora
4	Ndinotenda Midzimu Yangu
5	Tulisile
6	Munyika Munezvipo
7	Usaore Moyo
8	Pasina Rudhe

Ruva Rashe	1989
1	Ruva Rashe
2	Janet
3	Vane Mazita Ngava Remekedzwe
4	Ngavakudziwe
5	Ndave Sekete
6	Imba Yemashoko
7	Nhasi Ndazomuona

Chitekete	1991
1	Chitekete
2	Sarura Wako
3	Chinyemu
4	Tamba Yangu Nditambe Yako
5	Ndozvireva Kunaani

Nzungu Ndamenya	15 February 1994	Running time
1	Nzungu Ndamenya	12:35
2	Kukura Mumhu	10:21
3	Munovenga Mudzimai Wangu	12:57
4	Ndibatsireivo Ndanzwa	10:21
