= Winky D =

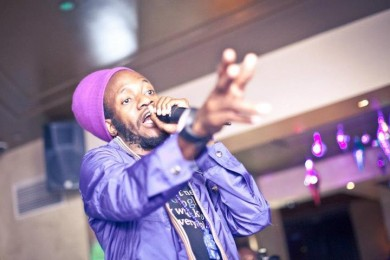
- Winky D at the Africa Unplugged concert, Wembley Arena 2012, in London

Background information
- Born: Wallace Chirumiko; February 1, 1983 (age 43)
- Origin: Kambuzuma
- Genres: Dancehall, Reggae, Zimdancehall
- Occupation: Musician
- Years active: 2004–present
- Labels: Black Lab Records, Vigilance Music, Independent (current)
- Website: http://www.winkydonline.com

Winky D Born Wallace Chirumiko is a Zimbabwean reggae-dancehall artist, popularly known as "The Big Man" (stylized as "Di Bigman") also referred to as Gafa. His music provides social commentary about Zimbabwean society.

== Early life and career ==
As a teenager, Winky D began showcasing his music at various local events and concerts. At the age of 16, he participated in the Ghetto Lane Clashes, a series of DJ battles designed to showcase up-and-coming artists. Over time, he earned the nickname 'Wicked DeeJay', which was eventually shortened to Winky D. Recently, Winky D has shifted his focus to being the voice of the poor Zimbabwean people and has been an advocate against drug addiction.

== Music career ==
Winky D was among the artists featured in the Southern Africa Music Airwaves (SAMA) Festival in 2009.

Winky D has released seven studio albums and toured in the United Kingdom, United States, Asia, and South Africa.

Winky D is an advocate for male circumcision. As a call to action for his fans, Winky D and Albert Nyoni (Vanyoni Beats) released a track entitled "If you know you are a champion get circumcised". The song was launched in Harare on 19 January 2012.

Winky D failed to perform at President Robert Mugabe's inauguration gala held in August 2013 at the National Sports Stadium. There were contrasting statements about the musician's whereabouts during the event.

In 2023, Winky D launched his studio album Eureka Eureka. Some songs from the album, especially "Ibotso" and "Dzimba Dzemabwe", provide commentary on social ills in Zimbabwean society, in particular corruption and the struggles faced by young people. In response, a pressure group affiliated with the ruling party ZANU–PF called for Winky D's music to be banned in Zimbabwe. In March 2023, the Zimbabwe Republic Police shut down a Winky D concert in Chitungwiza just as he began to sing the song "Ibotso" leading to widespread condemnation.

On 31 December, he filled the Harare International Conference Center (HICC) for his Ghettocracy show. This event served as a celebration of his 20-year journey in the music industry.

== Feuds ==
Winky D had 'beef' with then-dancehall artists such as Badman and Daddy D. They battled back and forth lyrically, from which he emerged as a victor.

Winky D, alongside The General and Sniper Storm, were scheduled to perform as opening acts for Mavado.

Winky D called for peace among the Zimdancehall artists through his songs and interviews.

== Partial discography ==
- War
- The Devotee
- Igofigo – The Unthinkable
- PaKitchen
- Life Yangu
- Gafa Life Kickstape
- Gafa Futi
- Gombwe: Chiextra
- Njema
- Eureka Eureka
- One big party

== Awards ==
- Best Male Artist in Southern Africa - Ngoma Awards (Zambia)
- Best Male Artiste in Southern Africa - All Africa Music Awards 2022
- People's Choice Award - National Arts Merit Awards (NAMA) 2020, 2021, 2022, 2023, 2024, 2025
- Best Dancehall Artist - African Entertainment Awards USA 2020
- Best African Dancehall Entertainer - International Reggae and World Music Awards 2023
- Best Album - Njema - Zimdancehall Awards 2020
- People's Choice Award - National Arts Merit Awards (NAMA) 2024

== See also ==
- Afropop
- Chimurenga
- Mbira
- Music of Zimbabwe
- Shona music
