= Tongai Moyo =

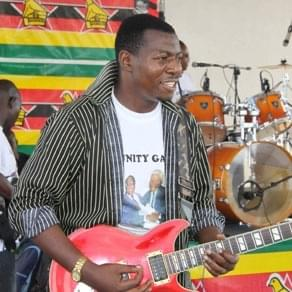
- Moyo performing at Sakubva Stadium in December 2010

Background information
- Also known as: Dhewa, Igwe or Murozvi Mukuru, Veganda Remvura, Samanyemba, Muchina Muhombe, Bvumavaranda, Mudzimu Weshiri, Muridzi Wenyaya, Father Flower, Mopao Mokonzi, Big Boss
- Born: Tongai Moyo; 12 March 1968
- Origin: Kwekwe, Zimbabwe
- Died: 15 October 2011 (aged 43)
- Genres: Sungura
- Occupations: Singer-songwriter, dancer, choreographer
- Instruments: Lead vocals, guitar
- Years active: 1988–2011
- Labels: Gramma Records

Tongai Moyo (12 March 1968 – 15 October 2011) was a contemporary Zimbabwean musician, often referred to as Dhewa. Born and raised in Kwekwe, Dhewa rose to fame in the late 1990s as a solo artist and with the band Utakataka Express. Highly successful singles including "Samanyemba", "Nemumvura Mese" also known as “Naye” by fans, and "Muchina Muhombe" led to his national, regional and international fame; he produced 14 albums in a career of over twenty years.

His 15th and final album, Toita Basa, was released on 25 November 2010 by record label Gramma Records. The album was released while he was being treated for cancer, which had been diagnosed in 2007. The song "Ndinobvuma" was especially dedicated to his fight against the disease.

== Background ==
Tongai Moyo was an award-winning popular legendary Sungura icon, who was best known for his flamboyant lifestyle. Moyo became popular in the early 1990s after releasing smash hits such as 'Samanyemba' and 'Mudzimu weshiri' with his band Utakataka Express.

Moyo was born on 12 March 1968 in Kwekwe. He died on 15 October 2011. He was married to Mininhle Mukweli and had six children namely Natasha, Nicole, Obert (Tongai Jnr), Tanaka and Nyasha and Peter Moyo. He was also known to be short-tempered. There are many backstage incidents in which he would get angry but his fans never got to know. His smile would conceal everything when he went on stage. “He hated indiscipline in the band and talked tough when he was upset. At one time he actually beat up our drummer when he misbehaved during our tour of South Africa. “The drummer, Guyson Sixpence got drunk before the show and failed to perform. We had left another drummer back home to cut costs and Guyson had promised to be a good guy.

== Music career ==
The talented musician started his career in 1988 in his home-town Kwekwe. To honor his craft, the 'Muchinamuhombe' singer, played in numerous bands and eventually joined Shirichena Jazz Band as a session musician, and helped the band to release two albums and a single. The most popular was "Ndoita Zvangu Ndega" which was released in 1991 Moyo was virtually known by then. He went on to create his own band the Utakataka Express after which he released his first solo album, 'Vimbo' in 1996. The album earned Moyo a name in the music industry, which was dominated by the likes of Nicholas Zakaria and Alick Macheso who sang the same genre. Since then, he never looked back and went on to release 14 albums to his credit. The album "Naye" saw Dhewa hogging the limelight with his chart topper "Nemumvura Mese" which earned him two Zimbabwe Music Awards (ZIMA). At the time of his death, Moyo had just released his 14th album 'Toita Basa'.

== Rival with Alick Macheso ==
During the peak of his music career, there was a debate among sungura fans over superiority between Tongai Moyo and Alick Macheso. The two competed for the number one spot on Radio Zimbabwe every season. Tongai Moyo's fans believe that the sungura scene would have been a lot better if he was still alive and sungura genre also breathed its last the moment Dhewa breathed last. His fierce battle with Alick Macheso led Tongai Moyo to look for ways to bolster his music in a bid to overcome the competition between him and 'Extra basso'. Alick Macheso and Dhewa’s relationship is also rumoured to have broken down irretrievably when the two music giants clashed over the same woman on two different occasions.

== Personal life ==
He was married to Miniehle Mukweli and had six children namely Natasha, Nicole, Obert (Tongai Jnr), Tanaka and Nyasha and Peter Moyo. Tongai Moyo was known to have seven wives in his lifetime. His known formal wives are Maud Chirwa (Peter’s mother), mother to Nyasha Brenda Moyo (whose name we could not establish), the late Barbara Muchengeti and his surviving wife Miniehle Mukweli. Nothing much has been documented about his first wife Maud as she only came to the public forum after Dhewa was in his last days. Her claim to fame is by virtue of having given birth to the heir-apparent to the throne, the young Igwe, Peter. It is widely said that Maud and Dhewa divorced before Peter could even utter a single word. His second wife was mother to Nyasha Brenda, whose real name we could not establish as she is reported to be staying in South Africa. The third wife, Barbara Muchengeti, died in 2010 when she committed suicide, in yet unknown circumstances as she did not leave a suicide note. Even Dhewa died without knowing why his wife had taken her life. Barbara Muchengeti died at Kwekwe General Hospital where she had been admitted after taking poison following a domestic dispute. The Utakataka Express front man later confirmed the death a day after the death of his wife. The artiste suspects things took a bad turn when he invited his younger wife to stay with them about four months prior to the death of his wife. Tongai Moyo later recounted “We had a family discussion with Barbara, my second wife (Miniehle Mukweli) and my sister as we tried to seek ways on how to improve our life. “As you know I have been sick and saw it fit to bring the two women under one roof. Barbara akabvuma zvaakange asingade ( Barbara agreed to bringing in the second wife) and I never suspected it would end like this (her committing suicide),” After the death of Tongai Moyo, his surviving window, Miniehle Mukweli, was reported to be pregnant and expecting her second child, but this time with her late husband’s best friend, Kwekwe businessman Barmet Mutosvori. Miniehle confirmed to a local tabloid that she had moved in with Mutosvori and the two lovebirds had decided to settle down and “very soon wedding bells will be ringing since he paid everything as per our custom.”. At some point in his career, Tongai Moyo was reported to be homeless. For all his fame and flair, Kwekwe-based sungura musician Tongai “Dhewa” Moyo had nothing to show for it. Not even a house. After more than a decade in the music industry and about 14 albums under his belt, the Utakataka Express frontman lived in a rented house in Msasa, Kwekwe. Tongai Moyo took a public HIV test to kill off rumours that he was in fact battling the illness. The singer tested negative for the HIV virus.

== International tours ==
Dhewa travelled the length and breadth of the world giving his music fans a musical therapy. He toured the United Kingdom, US, Botswana and South Africa at times in the company of Oliver Mtukudzi and Alick Macheso.

== Awards ==
Tongai Moyo received a number of awards during his blissful music career. The album "Naye" saw Dhewa hogging the limelight with his chart topper "Nemumvura Mese" which earned him two Zimbabwe Music Awards (ZIMA). At the time of his death, Moyo had just released his 14th album 'Toita basa'.

== Discography ==
Albums:

- Utakataka (1995) [when he was with Rairo 5]
- Vimbo (1996)
- Mano (May 1997)
- Vise (1998)
- Naku (1999)
- Moyo Wekurera with Somandla Ndebele (1999)
- Mudzimu Weshiri (2001)
- Chirangano with Somandla Ndebele (2001)
- Samanyemba (2002)
- Chingwa (June 2003)
- Pakanaka Dhewa (2004)
- Naye (2005)
- Pinda Panyanga (March 2007)
- Muridzi Wenyaya (December 2008)
- Toita Basa (November 2010)

Singles:

- Barika iHondo (2000)
- Dewa (2000)
- Shindi (2000)
- Uchademba Vakafa (2000)

Collaborations:

- Zvakanaka with Jeff Matheatau (2007)

Complications:

- Hits (2002)
- Dhewa’s Love Songs 1997 - 2008 (2009)

== Death ==
Tongai Moyo succumbed to non-Hodgkin's lymphoma at St Anne's Hospital on the evening of Saturday 15 October 2011 in Harare. Over 15 000 people packed into Mbizo Stadium in Kwekwe to pay their last respects to music superstar Tongai Moyo. in Kwekwe. He was buried in Zhombe his rural home. Tongai Moyo had made it public that he was battling cancer and his struggle with the disease was recorded in a documentary film in October 2011, the same year he succumbed to the deadly illness. Prior to his death, Tongai Moyo was hospitalized at St Annes hospital in Harare. Fellow musicians Sulumani Chimbetu, his best friend Somandla Ndebele, First Farai and Pastor Charles Charamba and Olivia Charamba, among others, attended a special church service that was held in Harare. Business came to a standstill as Moyo’s body, accompanied by family members and friends, was driven from the funeral parlour to his home town of Kwekwe. The then Zimbabwean Prime Minister Morgan Tsvangirai issued a statement mourning the death of Moyo describing him as “an iconic musician who raised the country’s flag and helped lift the arts industry in the country.” Tsvangirai said Moyo had “kept the nation entertained through his thought-provoking lyrics and was one of the most popular musicians in the country.”. Tongai Moyo and Tsvangirai had over the years struck up a close bond. When Tsvangirai’s wife Susan died in a suspicious car accident, Moyo travelled all the way to Buhera for the burial. When Moyo’s first wife committed suicide in 2010, Tsvangirai spent a considerable amount of his time at his house in Kwekwe consoling his friend. Sungura ace Alick Macheso spoke of how devastated he was when he heard the news of the death of Tongai Moyo. Macheso, who is viewed by many sungura music lovers as the arch rival to the late Moyo, said he first learnt of the death when he was on tour in Chiredzi. He said he learnt how special life was from the death of Dhewa saying God was in control of everything that we do in life. “You see no one has control over God and I think there one thing I learnt about death is that we have to make the most out of our lives,” he said.
