= John Chibadura =

Zimbabwean musician (1957–1999)

- Also known as: Mr Chitungwiza
- Born: John Nyamukokoko; 17 February 1957
- Died: 4 August 1999 (aged 42)
- Genres: museve reggae, rumba, sungura
- Years active: 1980–1999

John Chibadura (1957–1999) was a Zimbabwean guitarist, singer, and songwriter. He was a member of pioneering sungura group The Sungura Boys, and found great success in Zimbabwe and Mozambique with his band The Tembo Brothers and as a solo artist.

== Early life ==
Chibadura was born John Nyamukokoko on 17 February 1957 in Bindura District, Southern Rhodesia (now Zimbabwe). Chibadura's parents were migrant workers from Mozambique, and his mother died in 1962. His father remarried, and Chibadura's stepmother had him live with his grandfather, who played the mbira. As a child Chibadura took care of his father's goats, and on finishing school he worked as a truck driver.

== Musical career ==
Chibadura began learning banjo in 1968. In 1980 he moved to Harare, where he lived in the town of Chitungwiza that later gave him his nickname "Mr Chitungwiza". In Harare he joined Ephraim Joe's band the Sungura Boys as lead singer, appearing on the album John and The Sungura Boys in 1984. Nhamo Anthony Mhiripiri writes that "The Sungura Boys...is generally thought to be the first 'institution' of sungura music that nurtured and developed most future sungura stars including John Chibadura". Chibadura's band the Tembo Brothers, formed in 1985, were one of the most successful Zimbabwean rumba bands of the 1980s and 90s, and toured the UK twice. They were also extremely popular in Mozambique, where they played to crowds of 40 thousand people and met Mozambican President Joaquim Chissano several times.

In the 1990s Chibadura became ill and had to mortgage his property and sell his possessions to pay for treatment. He died on 4 August 1999, aged 42, and received a pauper's funeral.

=== Musical style and themes ===
Chibadura is primarily remembered as a player of sungura and, with his band the Tembo Brothers, of Congolese rumba. However Chibadura also incorporated traditional Zimbabwean music into his sound, making use of indigenous Shona drumming and mbira on tracks like "'Baya WaBaya" and "Nhamo Yatakawona", as well as recording music in the genre of museve. In the 1980s and 1990s Chibadura recorded several reggae songs, some of which were compiled and released together in 2004.

Chibadura is known for his "intense voice and achingly poignant lyrics," with themes of "downbeat misery: broken families, excessive dowries, [and] wasted opportunities." His 1988 song "Zuva Rekufa Kwangu" (The Day I am Going to Die) includes the lyric "my God, I want to know the day of my death."

== Discography ==
Albums

- John and The Sungura Boys (1984, Gramma Records), cassette release with The Sungura Boys

Compilations

- The Best of John Chibadura (1986, Zimbabwe Music Corporation)
- The Greatest Reggae Hits (2004)
