= Chitungwiza =

Place in Harare Province, Zimbabwe

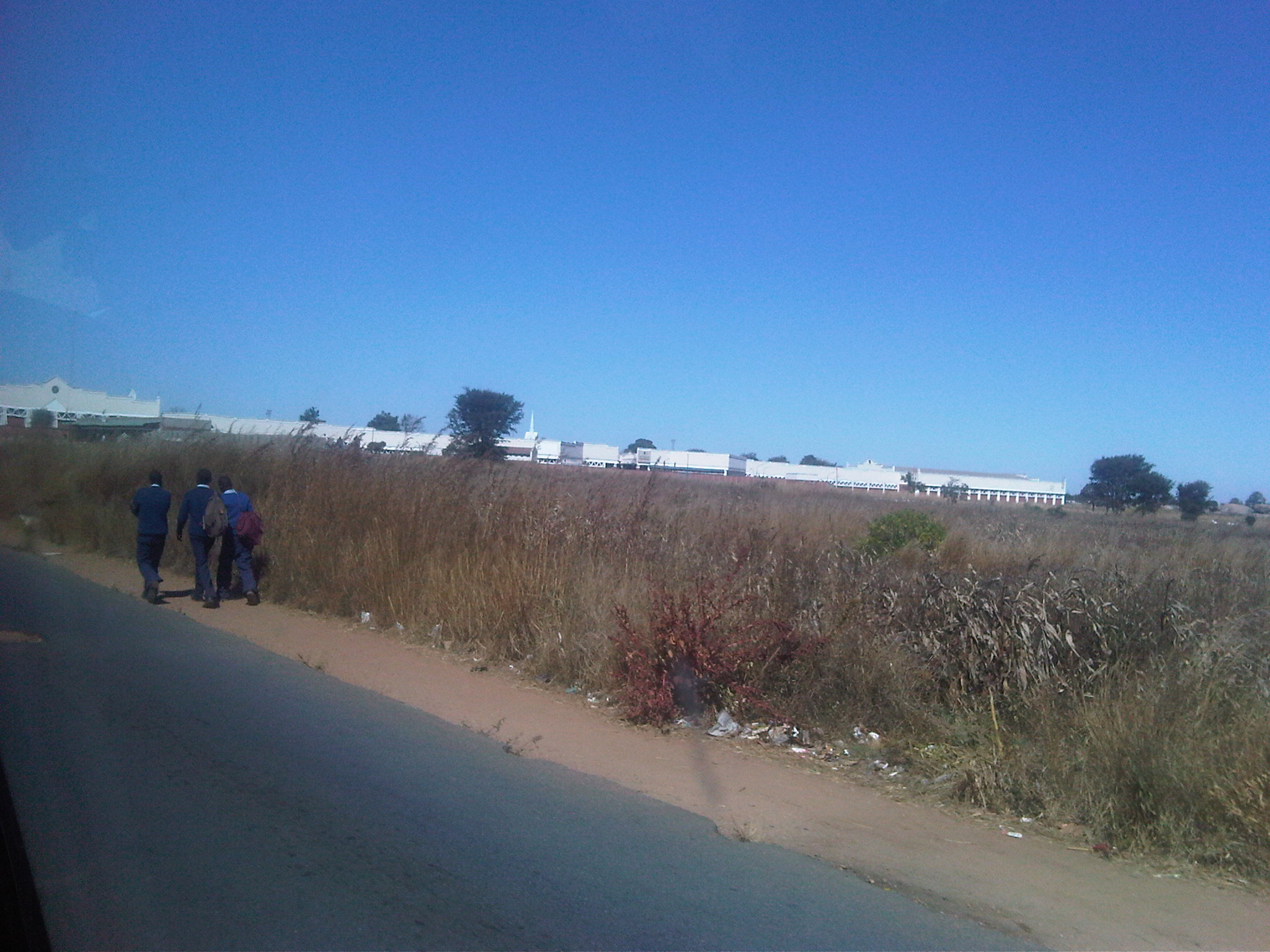

- Coat of arms
- Nickname: Chi Town
- Motto: Pamberi nekushandira pamwe
- Location within Zimbabwe
- Coordinates: 17°59′38″S 31°02′53″E
- Country: Zimbabwe
- Province: Harare Province

Area
  - Total: 49.02 km^{2} (18.93 sq mi)
- Elevation: 1,448 m (4,751 ft)

Population (2022 census)
  - Total: 371,244
  - Density: 7,573/km^{2} (19,610/sq mi)
- Time zone: UTC+2 (CAT)
- Postal code: 0270
- Website: www.chitungwiza.co.zw

Chitungwiza is the third populous urban centre in Zimbabwe and town of Harare Province in Zimbabwe. It is located on the outskirts of Harare.

== History ==
As of the 2022 census, Chitungwiza had a population of 371,244.

There are two main highways which connect the city to Harare namely Seke road and Chitungwiza road.

The Chitungwiza Aquatic Complex, built in 1995 for the All Africa Games, is no longer functional, and serves as a music and church venue.

== Informal settlements ==
Following the civil war, the area experienced rapid Rural-urban migration. Chitungwiza grew rapidly and the squatted area of Chirambahuyo alone had a population of 30,000 in 1979. Chirambahuyo was demolished by the authorities in 1982 and the inhabitants squatted elsewhere in the city in areas such as Mayambara.

Slum areas in Chitungwiza were destroyed by Operation Murambatsvina in 2005. By the mid-2010s, the number of people squatting in informal settlements was growing. In 2020, the local authorities abandoned their plans to demolish squatter homes in Nyatsime, Seke, St Mary’s and Zengeza, after a court order was requested.

Demolitions during Operation Murambatsvina in 2005

== Notable people ==
The musician Maskiri comes from Chitungwiza.

In 2019 and 2020, Dr. Tonderai Kasu served as the acting town clerk.

Alick Macheso is also from Chitungwiza.
