= Alick Macheso =

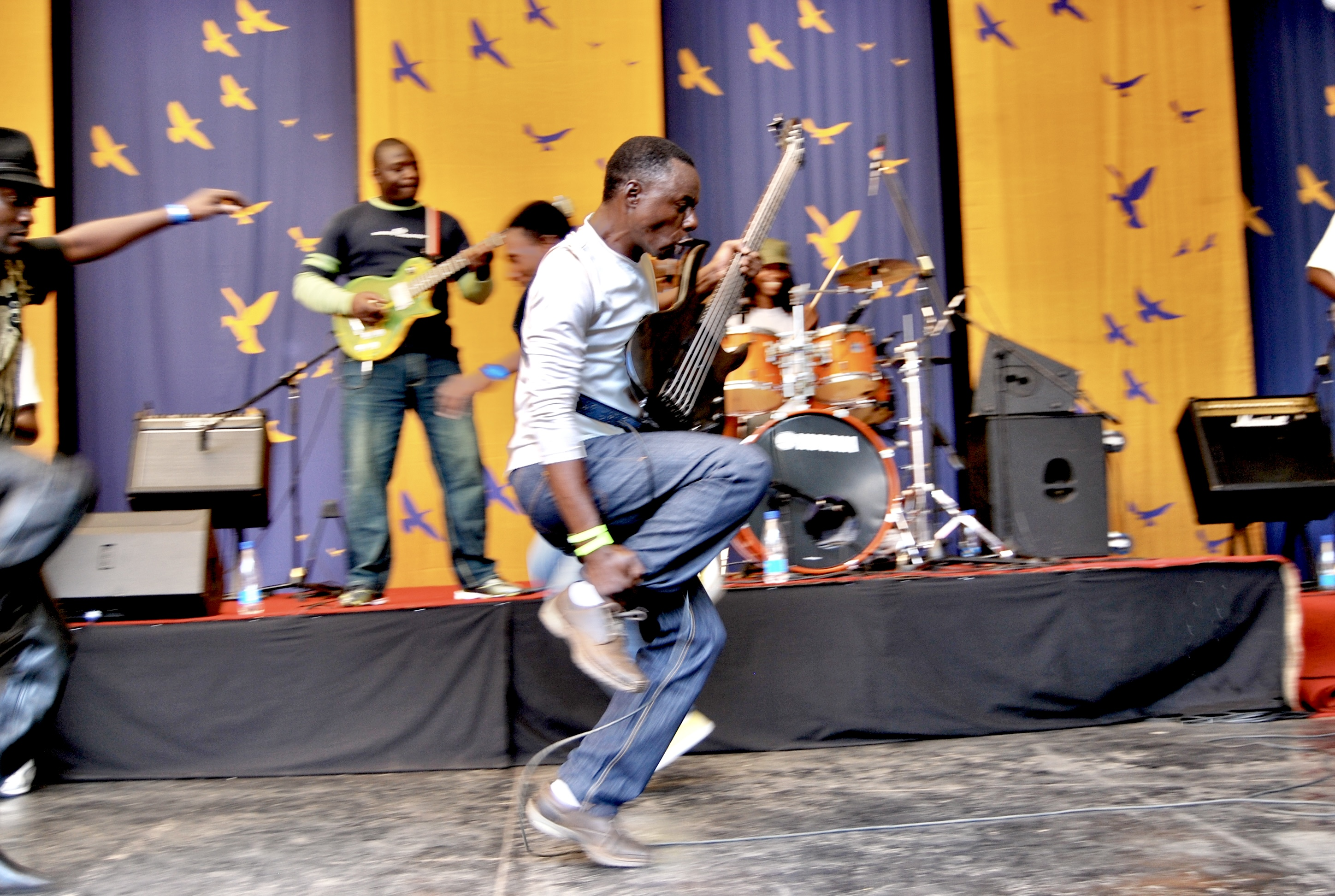
- Alick Macheso performing in 2009

Background information
- Also known as: Extrabasso, Razorwire, Cheso Power, Chikopokopo, Baba Shero, Aleck, Chesology, Mopao Mokonzi
- Born: Alick Silva Macheso; 10 June 1968 (age 58)
- Origin: Shamva, Zimbabwe
- Genre: Sungura
- Occupations: Singer-songwriter, guitarist, dancer, choreographer
- Instruments: Bass guitar, lead guitar, rhythm guitar, vocals
- Years active: 1983–present
- Labels: ZMC, Last Power, Alema Studios, Gramma Records

Alick Macheso (born 10 June 1968), is a Zimbabwean musician.

His album, Simbaradzo, was and still is the best-selling album of all time in Zimbabwe with mega hits like "Mundikumbuke" and "Amai VaRubhi". The success of Simbaradzo was followed up with his album Zvakanaka Zvakadaro sealing his place as the greatest sungura musician of all time. Macheso can dance, sing, and play the bass, rhythm and lead guitars. In 2011 he initiated the popular Zora Butter dance which has come to be known as Macheso's initiative. On 10 June 2022 he released his 12th album Tinosvitswa Nashe. On 2 August 2024 he launched his 13th Album titled Kupa Kuturika at the Alexandra Sports Club.

== Discography ==
Albums:

- Magariro (1998)
- Vakiridzo (1999)
- Simbaradzo (2000)
- Zvakanaka Zvakadaro (2001)
- Zvido Zvenyu Kunyanya (2003)
- Vapupuri Pupurai (2005)
- Ndezvashe-Eh (2007)
- Zvinoda Kutendwa (2010)
- Kwatakabva Mitunhu (Kure KweKure) (2012)
- Tsoka Dzerwendo (Ayayaa) (2016)
- Dzinosvitsa Kure (2018)
- Tinosvitswa Nashee (2022)
- Kupa Kuturika (Kupa Kunopa) (2024)

Singles:

- Zuro Ndizuro (single, 2020)

Complications:

- Collection (2006)
- Alick Macheso & Orchestra Mberikwazvo Greatest hits, Vol. 1 (Live In Johannesburg) (2007)
- Alick Macheso & Orchestra Mberikwazvo Greatest hits, Vol. 2 (Live In Johannesburg) (2007)
- Greatest Hits (2007)
