= List of Zimbabweans =

This is a list of notable Zimbabweans. This list includes people born in Zimbabwe, notably of Zimbabwean descent, or otherwise strongly associated to Zimbabwe.

== Academics ==
- Gordon Chavunduka (1931–2013), sociologist and traditional healer, Vice Chancellor of the University of Zimbabwe
- Tonderai Kasu, medical doctor and Substantive Director of Health and Environmental Services for Chitungwiza
- Joseph Landsberg (born 1938), forestry scientist, author, science administrator and consultant, awarded 2020 Marcus Wallenberg Prize
- Fadzayi Mahere (born 1985), lawyer and critic of the government, independent candidate in Zimbabwean general election, 2018
- Collen Masimirembwa, professor of clinical pharmacology
- Mufti Ismail ibn Musa Menk (born 1975), Muslim cleric (Ulama), Islamic proselytiser, motivational speaker

== Actors ==
- Steven Chigorimbo (born 1951), actor, producer, and director
- Kudzai Chimbaira, actress
- Danai Gurira, actress
- Charmaine Mujeri, actress
- Jesesi Mungoshi, actress
- Sandra Ndebele, dancer and actress
- Memry Savanhu, Nollywood actress

== Artists ==
- Coster Balakasi (born 1972), sculptor
- Dominic Benhura (born 1968), sculptor
- Richard Chiwasa (born 1947), sculptor
- Pfungwa Dziike (born 1972), sculptor
- Charles Fernando (1941–1995), artist
- Bronson Gengezha (born 1981), sculptor
- Tawanda Kanhema (born 1981/1982), technologist, photographer
- Onias Mupumha, sculptor
- Thakor Patel, painter
- Anthony Sabuneti (born 1974), sculptor
- Ronika Tandi (born 1975), sculptor
- Brian Watyoka, sculptor

== Businesspeople ==
- John Bredenkamp (born 1940), founder of the Casalee Group
- Phillip Chiyangwa (born 1959), founder of the Affirmative Action Group; chair of Native Africa Investments Ltd
- Hazel Crane (1951-2003)
- Codilia Gapare, entrepreneur and magistrate
- David Hatendi (1953–2012), former CEO of MBCA Bank Ltd and NMB Bank Ltd, founder of Hatendi Private Equity Advisers
- Strive Masiyiwa (born 1961), founder of telecommunications firm Econet Wireless and Botswana's Mascom Wireless
- Mutumwa Mawere (born 1960), multi-industrialist
- Paul Tangi Mhova Mkondo (1945–2013), insurance guru, property magnate
- Tendai Moyo, founder of Ruka Hair in the UK
- Prag Lalloo Naran (1926–1981), multi-industrialist
- Trevor Ncube (born 1962), newspaper owner
- Divine Ndhlukula, founder of SECURICO

== Military personnel ==
- Happyton Bonyongwe (born 1960), retired major general of the Zimbabwe National Army
- Dumiso Dabengwa (1939–2019), former head of Zimbabwe People's Revolutionary Army (ZIPRA) intelligence
- Azim Daudpota (1933–2017), Pakistani commander of the Air Force of Zimbabwe
- Ken Flower (died 1987), head of the Central Intelligence Organisation
- Ambrose Gunda (died 2007), former brigadier general
- Chenjerai Hunzvi (1949–2001), chairman of the Zimbabwe National Liberation War Veterans Association
- Alfred Nikita Mangena (1943–1978), commander of ZIPRA
- Elson Moyo, former deputy commander of the Air Force of Zimbabwe and key figure in the 2017 Zimbabwean coup d'état
- Solomon Mujuru (1945–2011), commander of the Zimbabwe National Army
- Perrance Shiri (1955–2020), retired Air Chief Marshal of the Air Force of Zimbabwe
- Jabulani Sibanda, former ZIPRA soldier, president of the Zimbabwe National Liberation War Veterans Association
- Josiah Tongogara (1938–1979), commander of Zimbabwe African National Liberation Army (ZANLA)
- Vitalis Zvinavashe (1943–2009), first commander of the Zimbabwe Defence Forces

== Musicians ==
- Soul Jah Love (Soul Muzavazi Musaka, 1989–2021) – Zimdancehall artist known for "Ndini Uya Uya" and "Pamamonya Ipapo"; died February 2021
- Tocky Vibes (Obey Makambureyi, November 29 1993) – Zimdancehall artist known for "Mhai"; noted for socially conscious lyrics
- Baba Harare (Braveman Chizvino, born 22 December 1988) – Zimdancehall and sungura musician; one of the most popular artists in Zimbabwe
- Selmor Mtukudzi – Afro-jazz and contemporary artist; daughter of the late Oliver Mtukudzi; known for blending traditional Zimbabwean and gospel influences

== Sportspeople ==
=== Cricketers ===
- Scott Adamson (1906–1962), former cricketer for Rhodesia
- Derek Carle (born 1973), cricketer
- Shane Cloete (born 1971), cricketer
- Duncan Fletcher (born 1948), former national cricket captain and former England cricket team coach
- Andy Flower (born 1968), retired cricketer and captain of the Zimbabwe national cricket team
- Robin Gifford (born 1974), former cricketer
- Dave Hallack (born 1966), cricketer
- Pommie Mbangwa (born 1976), retired cricketer, professional sports commentator
- Waddington Mwayenga (born 1984), cricketer
- Henry Olonga (born 1976), retired professional cricketer
- Ray Price (born 1976), retired professional cricketer
- Bradley Robinson (born 1975), retired professional cricketer
- Heath Streak (born 1974), retired professional cricketer, head coach of the Zimbabwe national cricket team
- Darren Weber (born 1972), retired professional cricketer

=== Footballers ===
- Cleopas Dube (born 1990), forward
- Bruce Grobbelaar (born 1957), retired professional footballer
- Justice Majabvi (born 1984), professional footballer
- Clement Matawu (born 1982), midfielder
- Robson Muchichwa (born 1975), retired professional footballer
- Peter Muduhwa (born 1993), professional footballer
- Benjani Mwaruwari (born 1978), retired professional footballer
- Ndabenkulu Ncube (born 1988), professional footballer
- Peter Ndlovu (born 1973), retired professional footballer
- Tinashe Nengomasha (born 1982), professional footballer
- Esrom Nyandoro (born 1980), professional footballer
- Simbarashe Sithole, forward
- Sebastien Summerfield (born 2002), professional footballer
- Conrad Whitby (born 1984), midfielder

=== Others ===
- Byron Black (born 1969), retired professional tennis player
- Cara Black (born 1979), professional tennis player
- Wayne Black (born 1973), retired professional tennis player
- Warren Carne (born 1975), cross country mountain cyclist
- Tendai Chimusasa (born 1971), retired long distance runner
- Derek Chisora (born 1983), professional heavyweight boxer (active)
- Kirsty Coventry (born 1983), Olympic swimming medallist and former world record holder
- Brendon de Jonge (born 1980), professional golfer on the PGA Tour
- Tendai Mtawarira (born 1985), professional rugby union player
- Fabian Kabwe Muyaba (born 1970), retired professional Olympic Sprinter former record holder
- David Pocock (born 1988), Zimbabwe-born Australian rugby player
- Nick Price (born 1957), professional golfer and World Golf Hall of Fame inductee
- Vitalis Takawira (born 1972), retired professional footballer
- Micheen Thornycroft (born 1987), Olympic rower
- Kevin Ullyett (born 1972), retired professional tennis player'

== Writers ==
- M. K. Asante (born ca. 1982), Zimbabwe-born American author of Buck: A Memoir
- Catherine Buckle (born 1957), author of children's books shush autobiographical non-fiction
- NoViolet Bulawayo (born 1981), author of We Need New Names, shortlisted for the Man Booker Prize
- Jacob Chikuhwa (born 1940)
- Brian Chikwava (born 1972), writer and musician
- Shimmer Chinodya (born 1957), novelist
- Judy Croome (born 1958), writer
- Tsitsi Dangarembga (born 1959), author and filmmaker
- John Eppel (born 1947), writer
- Petina Gappah (born 1971), writer and lawyer
- Peter Godwin (born 1957), author, journalist, and documentary filmmaker
- Chenjerai Hove (1956–2015), writer
- Wiseman Magwa (born 1962), playwright
- Morgan Mahanya (born 1948), writer
- Onesimo Makani Kabweza (1939–1993), journalist and magazine editor
- J. Nozipo Maraire (born 1966), writer, entrepreneur, and doctor
- Dambudzo Marechera (1952–1987), actor
- Alexander McCall Smith (born 1948), Zimbabwe-born British author of The No. 1 Ladies' Detective Agency series
- Cont Mhlanga, playwright and theatre director
- Charles Mungoshi (1947–2019), writer
- Togara Muzanenhamo (born 1975), poet
- Angus Shaw (born 1949), journalist
- George Shire, scholar, political analyst, and cultural critic
- Wilbur Smith (1933–2021), author of historical fiction
- Yvonne Vera (1964–2005), writer

== Others ==
- Moud Goba, LGBTIQ+ human rights activist
- Chido Govera (born 1986), campaigner for sustainable farming
- Robert Martin Gumbura, former pastor and convicted criminal
- Mavis Moyo, Radio Zimbabwe (ZBC Radio 4) broadcaster
