= Disability in Zimbabwe =

Disability affects many people in Zimbabwe in both rural and urban areas. In spite of services provided by the government, philanthropists and welfare agencies, people with disabilities and their families often face several barriers. Philanthropist, Jairos Jiri, started services for people with disability in Zimbabwe in the 1940s. He is regarded as the father or founder of disability work in Zimbabwe.

== Definition ==
In the Disabled Persons Act [Chapter 17:01] of 1995 (amended in 2000 and 2001), Zimbabwe government defines a person with a disability as:

...a person with physical, mental or sensory disability, including a visual, hearing or speech functional disability, which gives rise to physical, cultural or social barriers inhibiting him from participating at an equal level with other members of society in activities, undertakings or fields of employment that are open to other members of society.

Disabled people are one of the most marginalised, excluded and poorest groups in Zimbabwean society. Some people with disabilities in Zimbabwe are treated as second-class citizens. It is estimated about 900 000–1.4 million people have some sort of disability in Zimbabwe. Zimbabwe is a State Party to the Convention on the Rights of the Child (CRC) and the UN Convention on the Rights of Persons with Disabilities (UNCRPD).

== Demands in the constitution ==
In 2013, Zimbabwe modified its constitution. The process followed some consultations nationwide. From the consultations, some of the demands of people with disabilities were:

Demands of people with disabilities in the constitution
Demands	Description or Examples
Assistive devices	Wheelchairs, hearing aids, Braille etc.
Medical rehabilitation	Availability of specialists, medicines and payment of treatment bills.
Social assistance	A monthly allowance to cater for the needs of those without income
Income and social security	Provision of jobs and safety nets in the event of loss of income
Basic needs	Health, education, shelter, food etc.
Participation	Involvement in all key processes affecting their lives
Caregiver support	Supporting caregivers who otherwise loose productive time providing care to a disabled person
Acceptance and recognition	Treated with respect and dignity, without stigma and discrimination
Rights	A specific section in the constitution that guarantees rights to people with disabilities
Embracing definition	A definition of disability that covers all forms of disability and not only mental and physical
Mainstreaming disability	Every government department to respond to needs of people with disabilities
Ending abuse and criminalising it	Addressing the abuse of people with disabilities
Women with disabilities	Addressing the double burden of being disabled women
Government funding to disability issues	Availability of financial support to organisations for disabled persons and their programmes.
Accessibility	To buildings and facilities
Representation in parliament and local authorities	Quota system
Languages	Sign language and other disability friendly communication to be promoted

== Demographics ==
Disability exists in Zimbabwe mainly due to diseases, war conflicts, malnutrition, accidents, abnormal births, hereditary characteristics, etc. Disability statistics are debatable as a result of lack of consensus on what constitutes a disability. According to WHO, 15% of any given population has various forms of disability. The Government of Zimbabwe estimates that about 1% of the people live with disabilities in Zimbabwe. The National Association of Societies for the Care of the Handicapped (NASCOH) argues that disability prevalence in Zimbabwe is over 10% of the population (NASCOH, 2013). Others have cited a prevalence of 7%.

A large population of individuals with disabilities are children and young people. According to UNICEF as many as 600,000 children are living with some form of disability in Zimbabwe. About 53% of people living with disability population in Zimbabwe became disabled before the age of 20 years. Around 27% of disability with population from the birth while 9% disability exists between the ages limit of 1–5.

The disability population of males is estimated approximately about 56% while the disability population of women is around 44% as of 2013.

About 600 000 children live with disabilities in Zimbabwe according to the Department of International Development Zimbabwe as of 2013.

== Baba Jairos Jiri's Disability and Rehabilitation Model ==
Jairos Jiri was a founder of disability and rehabilitation work in Zimbabwe. Baba (meaning father) Jiri's disability and rehabilitation work can be described as follows:

- Encourage and treat people you want to help as friends or family, that is, be their parent.
- Use existing facilities and resources, for example, work together with friends, family, community, and use local resources at hospitals and clinics.
- Provide resources, e.g. take people to facilities because they may not be able to go on their own.
- Provide ideas about how rehabilitation could be done, that is, be an active carer.
- Provide accommodation (institutionalization) to reduce stigma and cost of care.
- Provide training and income opportunities like enterprises.

This model has been referred to by the acronym TO-PARENT as shown in the table below:

Jiri's TO-PARENT model of disability and rehabilitation
Letter	Description
T	Take people you want to help as your friends or family (ukama).
O	Only use existing facilities like friends, hospitals and homes (ujamaa).
P	Provide resources like transport people to facilities because they may not be able to go on their own.
A	Adequate care, education and support. Provide practical ideas about how rehabilitation could be done.
R	Reduce stigma and cost of care by providing housing (institutionalization).
E	Enterprises (ushavi) for income.
N	Need for supporting carers like his wife and friends.
T	Training opportunities for self-reliance.

The major strengths of his model are that it supports the building of skills and income but a major weakness in institutionalization because resources like food are limited. Further once institutionalized, people are separated from the community and it becomes very difficult for them to thrive in those communities when they go back. This model does not address the structural issues that cause disability, exclusion, and injustice. However, the work that he started has changed to include community work and advocacy for social inclusion.

Getting recognized by the name Baba on a national scale is not an easy thing to achieve in Zimbabwe. That respect is given to people who have played a major role in nation building. Baba Jiri was honored by Zimbabweans who refer to him as Baba, meaning Respected Father. In 1982 when he died, he was honored with National Hero of Zimbabwe status but opted to be buried in his home village of Bikita instead of at the National Heroes Acre in Harare. Being buried in the village among your other deceased family members is a key unhu value. Later, the government of Zimbabwe honored him by naming an award in his name, The Jairos Jiri Humanitarian Award given to people who contribute significantly to helping others, for example, those who helped Cyclone Idai victims in Chimanimani in 2019. In 1977, he was awarded an Honours Degree in Masters of Arts by the then University of Rhodesia.

Other awards included:

1. International Symposium on Rehabilitation awarded in Kampala, Uganda in 1975.
2. Audience with Pope Paul VI, where he received a blessing for his great work and was presented with a medal marking a Holy year in 1975.
3. Lions International Service Award in 1977.
4. Humanitarian Award from the then Salisbury Union of Jewish Women in 1977.
5. Freedom of the City of Los Angeles in 1981.
6. Goodwill Industries International Award for Humanitarian and Rehabilitation Work in 1981.
7. Rotary International presented him with their International Year of Disabled Person Award for Africa which carries the citation "Greatest Contribution to Rehabilitation in Africa - IYDP 1981".

== Birth of the Zimbabwe disability movement ==
The Zimbabwean disability movement for equality was born in institutions run by Jairos Jiri in 1975 but he did not support it. Like many people at that time, he saw the call for involvement, participation, and increased opportunities as a threat to his charity model. The movement emanated from people like Joshua Malinga who went on to become a politician against while rule and Mayor of Bulawayo from 1993 to 1995. The activists formed and registered the National Council of Disabled Persons Zimbabwe which started as Kubatsirana Welfare Society later National Council for the Welfare of Disabled while still in the institutions. In 1980, Malinga attended an international disability congress, Disabled Peoples' International's Winnipeg World Congress in Canada. This marked internationalization of disability work in Zimbabwe.

== Education ==
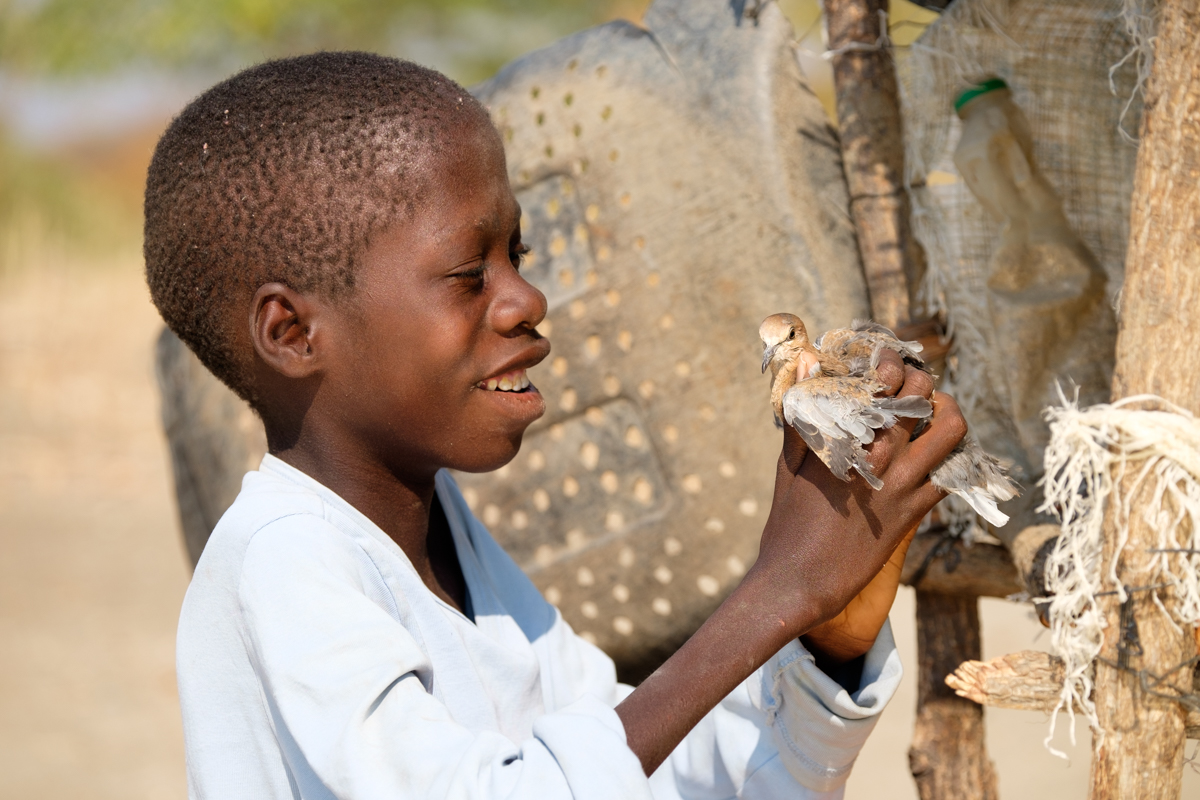
Shepherd and his bird in Zimbabwe

Around 52% of the disabled children in Zimbabwe have no access to education although Zimbabwe having a record of 93% literacy rate among its school-going children, which is also the best in the African continent. On the other hand, it was evident that about 34% of disabled women did not attend the school while 22% of disabled men did not attend the school. In Zimbabwe, we still have a situation where a good number of disabled children do not attend school. Planning for services without more current trends for children with disabilities is therefore a major challenge, compounded further by poor systems of routine data collection and management on the number of children receiving services.

In Zimbabwe, children with disabilities live under especially difficult, challengeable circumstances and are vulnerable as they live with negative attitudes, beliefs, customs, etc. People with disabilities looked at the constitution making process as their biggest opportunity to have their dreams realized and they had numerous expectations including increased opportunities in health, education, social protection, habitation, participation and employment.

Despite the advent of inclusive education learners with disabilities still face attitudinal, structural and physical barriers in accessing quality education.

== Employment ==
According to statistics, around 83% of disabled women have been unemployed, while about 74% of disabled men have been unemployed.

It is a common perception within Zimbabwe that disabled people are passive, inactive, economically inactive and unproductive and therefore constitute a "burden" upon the society.

== Legislation ==
Zimbabwe was one of the first countries in the world to enact disability discrimination legislation.

Zimbabwe ratified the CRPD and its Optional Protocol on 23 September 2013, thereby becoming the 135th state party to ratify the convention and its protocol. Zimbabwe is the State Party to the Convention on the Rights of Persons with Disabilities and to the Rights of the Child.

The Disabled Persons Act is the primary law that addresses disability in Zimbabwe.This act provides for welfare and rehabilitation of PWDs.

The mental health provides for the consolation and amendment of the law relating to the care, detention and aftercare of persons with mental disabilities for the purpose of treatment.

== Health care challenges ==
Many disabled individuals are unable to access health care due to the limited number of clinics and the distances they need to travel in order to get to a doctor. Some public transport providers force wheelchair users to pay extra to ride. People with disability have the same general health care needs as everyone else, and therefore need access to mainstream health care services. People with disabilities need health care and health programs for the same reasons anyone else does—to stay well, active, and a part of the community. Women with disabilities in Zimbabwe face numerous challenges in accessing sexual and reproductive health.

== Advocacy ==
There are a few organisations in Zimbabwe which represent and advocate for disabled people. They are

1. Alive Albinism Initiative, looks out for the welfare of Persons With Albinism in Zimbabwe. The organization aims to ensure that Persons With Albinism are economically empowered.
2. Association of the Deaf in Zimbabwe -Representative organisation for Persons with deafness and speech functional disabilities.
3. Council for Blind - This council plays a role with regards to persons with visual impairments.
4. Danhiko Project - Educational and vocational training institution for persons with disabilities.
5. Disabled Women Support Organisation - Advocates for rights of women with disabilities.

== Sport ==
=== Paralympics ===
Zimbabwe has been competing at the Paralympic Games since independence in 1980; it had previously competed as Rhodesia at the 1972 Summer Paralympics. Zimbabwe was absent from the Games in 1988 and 1992, returning in 1996 with a two-man delegation, and has competed at every edition of the Summer Paralympics since then. It has never entered the Winter Paralympics.

=== Deaflympics ===
Zimbabwe competed at the Deaflympics only once with making their debut at the 1993 Summer Deaflympics. The delegation consisted only 2 athletes from Zimbabwe to take part in its maiden Deaflympic appearance. Zimbabwe has never won a medal at the Deaflympics.
