= Peter Mageto =

Kenyan Academic

Vice Chancellor of Africa University
- Appointed by: The Africa University Board of Directors
- Succeeded by: Munashe Furusa

Personal details
- Born: Nyamira, Kenya
- Education: St Paul's United Theological College; Garett Evangelical Theological Seminary
- Occupation: Academic; Theologician

Peter Mageto is a Kenya professor of Theological ethics and the current vice chancellor of the Africa University.

== Early life and education ==
Mageto hailed from Nyamira in Kenya. He earned a bachelor degree in Divinity from St Paul's United Theological College in Kenya. He received a Master's and Doctoral degree in Theological Studies from Garrett-Evangelical Theological Seminary.

== Career ==
Before joining African University, Mageto was a vice chancellor at the University of Kigali in Rwanda. He served as adjunct assistant professor at the University of Evansville. He also served as the acting vice chancellor of Kenya Methodist University. In 2022, he succeeded professor Munashe Furusa

== Selected publications ==
- Mageto, Peter (2006). "Book Review: European Traditions in the Study of Religion in Africa". Missiology: An International Review. 34 (2): 257–260. doi:10.1177/009182960603400226. ISSN 0091-8296.
- Mageto, Peter (2006-03-21). Victim Theology. ISBN 978-1-4678-1197-2.
- Mageto, Peter (2015-03-18). "Corporate and personal ethics for sustainable development: experiences, challenges and promises of part-time". DSpace Repository.
