= Conrad Whitby =

Zimbabwean footballer (born 1984)

Personal information
- Full name: Conrad Robert Whitby
- Date of birth: 8 May 1984 (age 42)
- Position: Midfielder

Team information
- Current team: Wivenhoe Town

Senior career*
Years	Team	Apps	(Gls)
2004	Margate	1	(0)
2004	Ramsgate	1	(0)
2004–2005	Almondsbury		
2005–2006	Mangotsfield United		
2006	Bitton		
2006	Mangotsfield United		
2006–200?	Keynsham Town		
2008–2009	Motor Action		
2010	Eagles		
2011	Kiglon		
2011	Motor Action		
2012	CAPS United		
2012–201?	Township Rollers		
201?	Polokwane City		
201?	FC Cape Town		
2014	Wivenhoe Town	1	(0)

International career^{‡}
2012	Zimbabwe	1	(0)
- * Club domestic league appearances and goals ‡ National team caps and goals as of 12:21, 11 December 2014 (UTC)

Conrad Robert Whitby (born 8 May 1984) is a Zimbabwean footballer who plays as a midfielder for Wivenhoe Town of the Eastern Counties Football League Premier Division.

== Club career ==
Whitby started his career with English club Margate, having trialed with them in summer 2003 before signing for the club in January 2004. He went on to make three appearances for Margate, two in the Kent Senior Cup and one in the Conference South in the 3–3 draw with Dagenham & Redbridge on 6 March 2004. Whitby subsequently moved on to Ramsgate, where he made one appearance in the Kent Football League.

He went on to play for Mangotsfield United, Bitton and Keynsham Town. Whilst with Mangotsfield, Whitby served a 35-day suspension.

Whitby returned to Zimbabwe and played for Motor Action, Eagles, Kiglon and CAPS United before joining Botswanan club Township Rollers in 2012.

In 2014, he signed for Eastern Counties Football League Premier Division club Wivenhoe Town.

== International career ==
Whitby was called up to the Zimbabwe national football team as a last-minute replacement alongside Pardon Chinungwa, Cliff Sekete, Tendai Samanja, Masimba Mambare and Graham Ncube for a friendly against Botswana in January 2012. The games finished a 0–0 draw, with Whitby coming on as a substitute.

== Personal life ==
Whitby spent time in Thanet, Kent as a child and has a British passport.
