= Munashe Furusa =

Zimbabwean Academic

Vice Chancellor
- Succeeded by: Peter Mageto

Personal details
- Born: 1962
- Died: January 13, 2021 (aged 58–59) Mutare
- Citizenship: Zimbabwe
- Education: University of Zimbabwe

Munashe Furusa was a Zimbabwean professor of African Literature and Critical Theory and the former vice-chancellor of the Africa University.

== Early life and education ==
Munashe started his higher education journey by obtaining a Diploma in Education from Bondolfi Teachers College in Masvingo Zimbabwe. After that, he bagged a Bachelor of Arts and Masters degree in English and a PhD in African literature and critical theory from the University of Zimbabwe.

== Career ==
Munashe's served as chairman of the Zimbabwe Literature Curriculum Development Committee. He was a former Dean of College of Arts and Humanities at California State University. He was a former executive Director of Californian African American and Economic Institute (CAAPEI). He also served as Director of the Institute for Global Interactual Peacebuilding. In 2015, he was elected as the fourth Vice chancellor of the Africa University.

Munashe died on 13 January 2021 at Mutare in Zimbabwe after a short illness.
