= Africa University =

Private United Methodist-related institution

Coordinates: 18°53′51″S 32°36′04″E

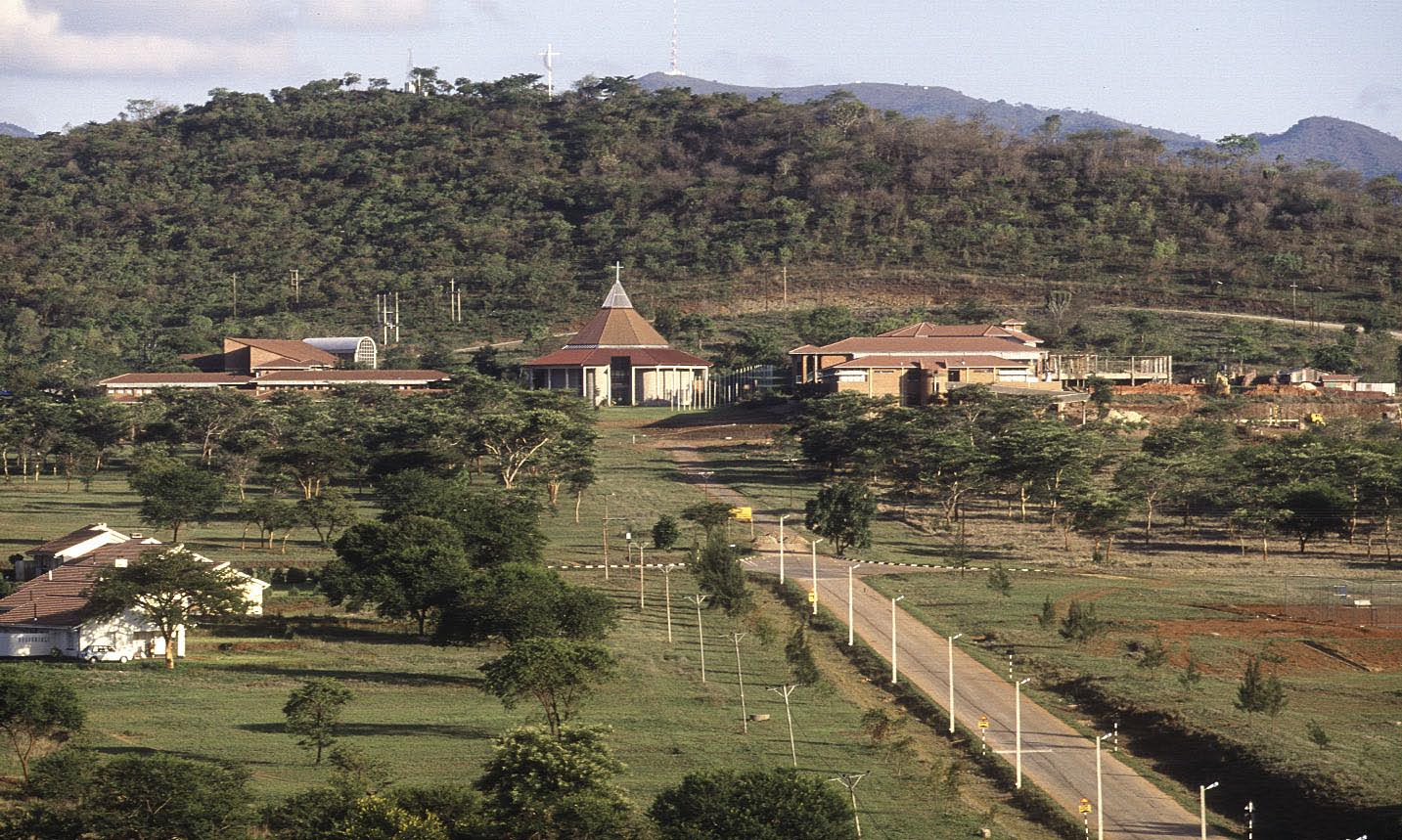
- Motto: Investing in Africa's Future
- Type: Private
- Established: 1992; 34 years ago
- Religious affiliation: United Methodist Church
- Chancellor: Bishop Gaspar João Domingos
- Vice-Chancellor: Rev. Professor. Peter Mageto
- Administrative staff: 250
- Students: 1,300
- Location: Mutare (Old Mutare), Manicaland, Zimbabwe
- Campus: Rural, 1,545 acres (625 ha)
- Nickname: Acacians
- Website: www.africau.edu

Africa University is a "private, Pan-African and United Methodist-related institution." In 2021 it had over 2,500 students from 31 African countries, of whom 58 percent were women and 24 percent came from outside Zimbabwe. The main campus is located 17 kilometres (11 mi) northwest of Mutare, the fourth largest city in Zimbabwe, on a 1,542 acres (6.24 km^{2}) rural site with 36 buildings. The university grants bachelor's, master's and PhD degrees in various programs. The language of instruction is English.

== History ==
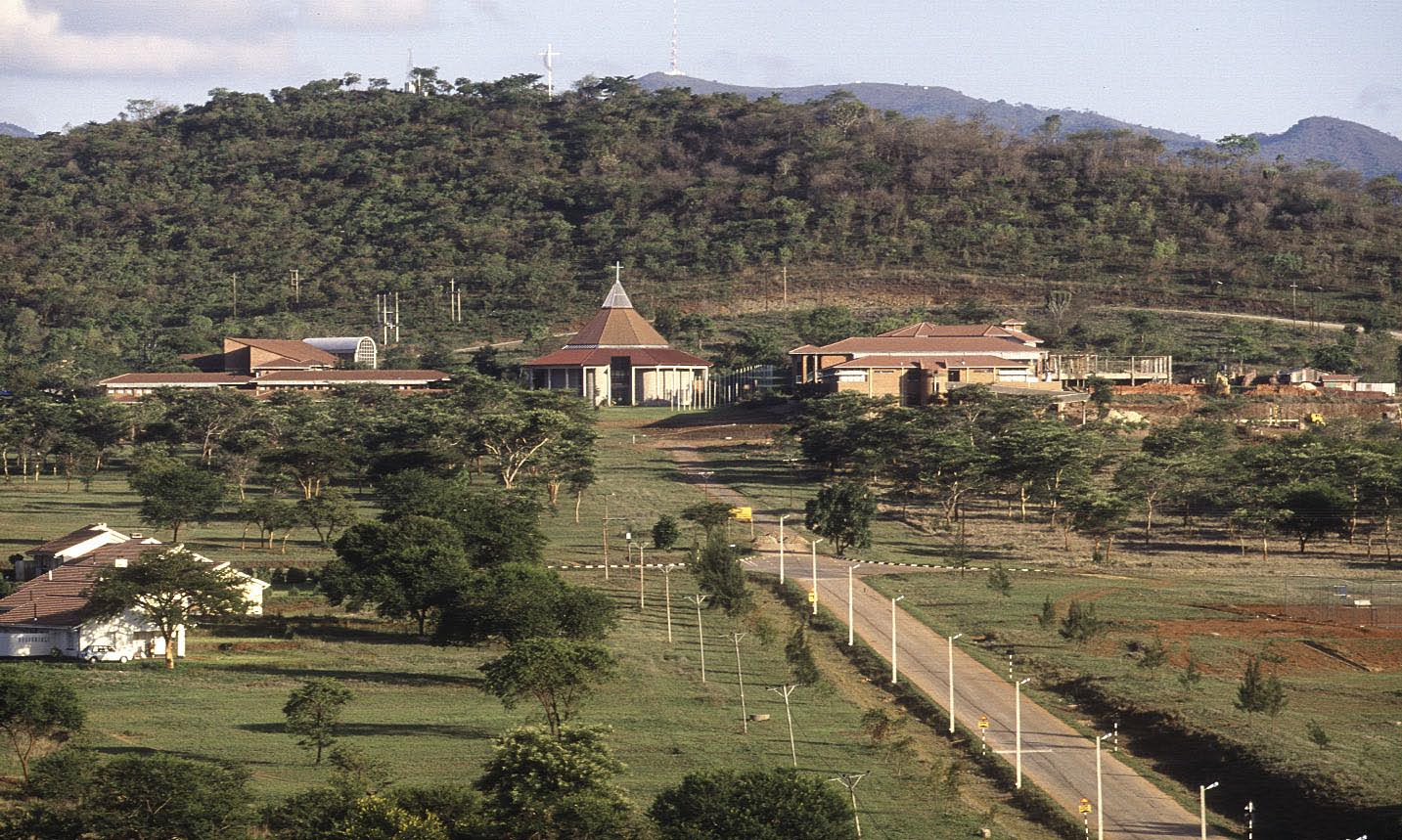
Campus view

The creation of a Methodist university in Africa for students from all of Africa was formally proposed in 1984 by Bishop Emilio de Carvalho of Angola and approved by the 1988 General Conference. Groundbreaking occurred in 1991, and classes began in 1992 with 40 students from six nations in two academic faculties. By 2014 the student population was 1,474 (53 percent women) from 23 nations, studying in six faculties. One student from the first graduating class had earned a doctorate in entomology and was teaching at the university.

By 2021 Africa University had over 2,500 students from 31 African countries, of whom 58 percent were women and 24 percent came from outside Zimbabwe. The 36 buildings on the main campus are supplemented by a satellite campus offering both undergraduate and graduate classes in Harare, the largest city and capitol of Zimbabwe. Thirteen residence halls on the main campus had a capacity of 1,130 students.

A report to the United Methodist General Conference in 2024 noted that the student body typically numbers about 2,500 full-time and 300 part-time students, with 95 percent graduating and 92 percent remaining on the continent of Africa. The university has more than 12,000 alumni as of 2024.

== Funding ==
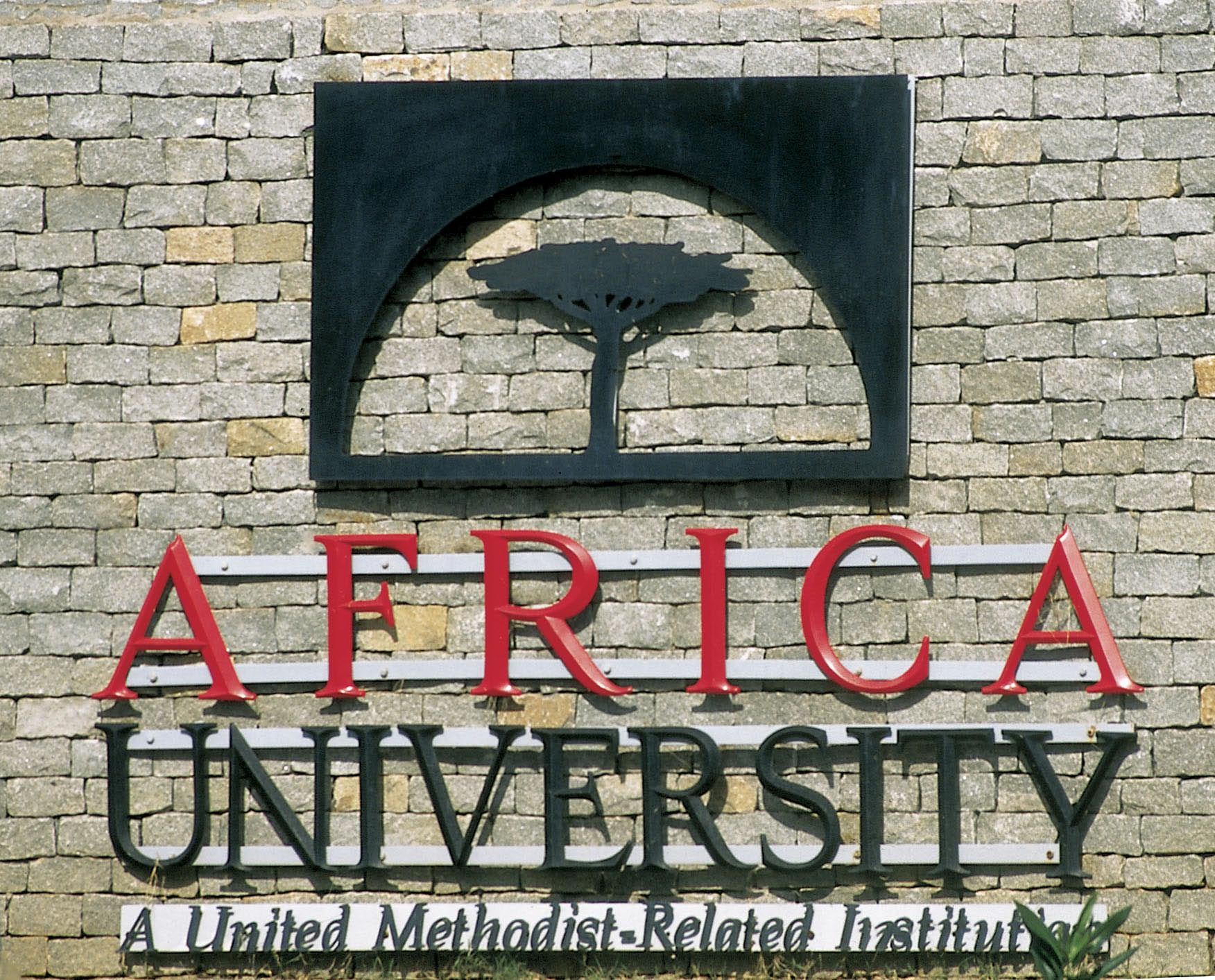
AU Sign, main entrance

The university operating budget in 2024 was $14 million. Additional funding of $5 million per year has been provided by the United Methodist Church since 1988, half for operating expenses and half to support development, construction, and the permanent endowment fund. As of 2022, the endowment fund held more than $100 million.

The Africa University Development Office located in Nashville, Tennessee, has the primary responsibility to raise funds for the permanent endowment as well as for capital projects.

== Structure ==
A 30-member board of directors chaired by Bishop Marcus Matthews governs Africa University. A founding member of Africa University's Faculty of Theology was elected the university's third chancellor on 8 December 2008. Professor Fanuel Tagwira, another founding member of the university's Faculty of Agriculture, was elected the university's third vice-chancellor in March 2009. As of 1 July 2014, Prof Munashe Furusa was unanimously elected as the new vice-chancellor.

Africa University is the first private, fully accredited, degree-granting United Methodist-related institution of higher learning on the continent of Africa as established and approved by General Conference. The university is Pan-African in design and spirit. Thirty six nations of Africa were represented in the student population for the 2015/2016 academic year. The majority of faculty and administrative staff are Africans. Professors and policy makers comprise permanent and visiting educators from the United States, Europe, and around the world. The official language at the university is English, which is also the official language of Zimbabwe.

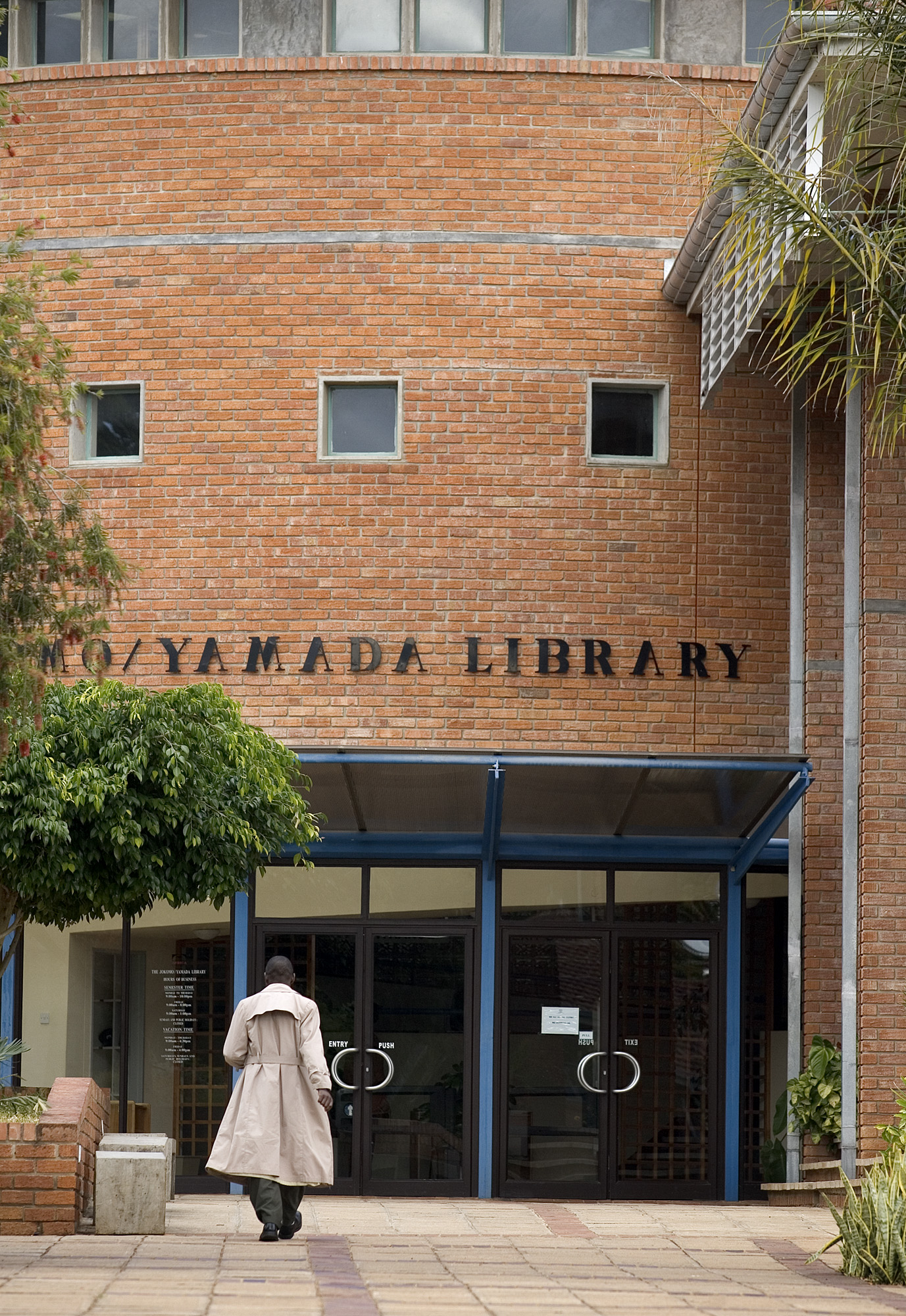
Library

There are thirty-two buildings on the campus with four currently under construction. The 32 buildings include 12 dormitories, 12 senior staff housing units, a chapel, and a state-of-the-art library complex. The four buildings under construction include a student clinic, two housing duplexes for senior staff, and the building for the Institute of Peace, Leadership, and Governance (IPLG).

Recently the Kent M. Weeks Archives was opened to collect all university and United Methodist Church records which are deemed to be of historic and research value.

== Academics ==
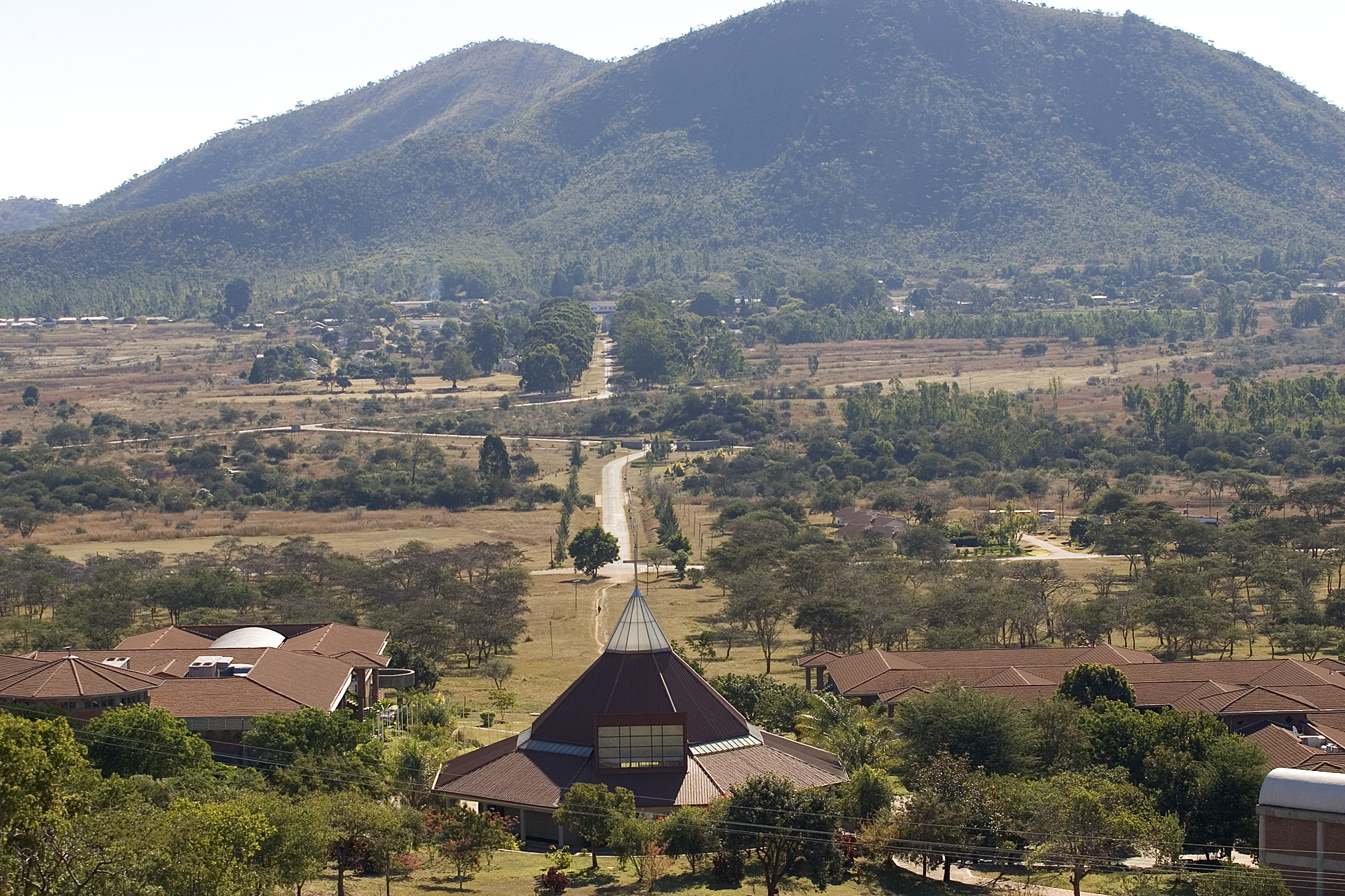
Africa University

There are currently 5 colleges at Africa University, namely The College of Health, Agriculture and Natural Sciences; The College of Business, Peace, Leadership and Governance; The College of Social Sciences, Theology, Humanities and Education; The School of Law and; The College of Engineering and Applied Sciences. There is also the Africa University Information Technology Training Center.

The university requires all graduates to achieve some proficiency in two non-African languages, being English (the language of instruction) and either French or Portuguese.

=== College of Health, Agriculture and Natural Sciences ===
- Agriculture & Natural Resources
- Health Sciences

The Department of Agriculture and Natural Sciences offers a Bachelor of Science and Master of Science degrees in Agriculture and Natural Resources.

The Department of Health Sciences offers undergraduate degrees in nursing and health science management and a master's degree in public health.

=== College of Business, Peace, Leadership and Governance ===
- Business
- Computer Science and Information Systems
- Institute of Peace, Leadership and Governance

The Department of Business offers a number of training options for those interested in careers in business development and management, marketing, finance, and administration. At the undergraduate level, it has a full-time 4-year programme leading to degrees in accounting, economics, and management, marketing and computer science. It offers a full-time 2-year MBA program and a part-time EMBA program for senior managers and administrators.https://executivemba.wharton.upenn.edu/mba-or-emba/

The Institute of Peace, Leadership and Governance (IPLG) is a graduate institute which offers master's degrees in peace and governance, public policy and governance, Human rights law, Migration law and a Masters in intellectual property law. It also offers a PhD in Peace Leadership and Governance. It also offers trainings and short courses for lawyers, civil servants and policy makers. It has various partners including World Intellectual property organization (WIPO) and the Open Society Initiative in Southern Africa (OSISA)

=== College of Social Sciences, Theology, Humanities and Education ===
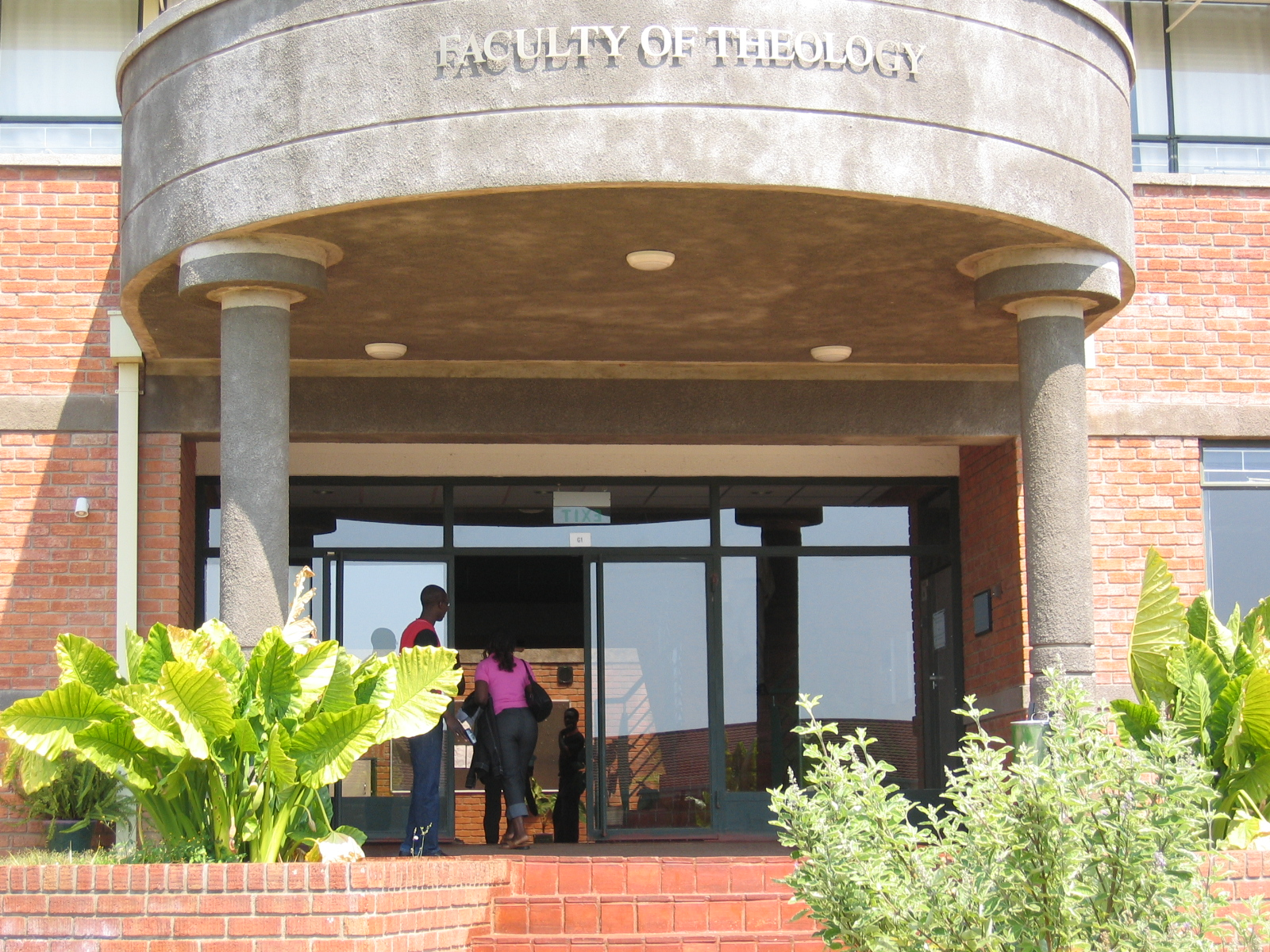
Department of Theology

- Humanities
- Social Sciences
- Theology
- Education

The Departments of Humanities and Social Sciences offer three- and four-year full-time degree programs, in the form of either a Bachelor of Arts or Bachelor of Social Sciences with specialisation in English, Environmental Studies, French, History, Music, Portuguese, Psychology, Sociology, or Religious Studies. Two master's degrees are offered in child and family studies.

The Department of Theology offers a four-year full-time Bachelor of Divinity degree and a two-year full-time Master of Theological Studies degree.

The Department of Education offers a four-year full-time Bachelor of Arts degree and a two-year Bachelor of Education degree for secondary school teachers. The two-year program is specifically designed for teaching professionals who wish to upgrade their skills.

== Notable alumni ==
- Glanis Changachirere, women's rights activist and founder of the Institute for Young Women Development (IYWD)
- Charles Charamba, gospel musician, pastor, songwriter, producer
- Herbert Gomba, former mayor of the City of Harare
- Chido Govera, farmer, campaigner, and educator
- Dr. Tonderai Kasu, substantive director of health and environmental services for Chitungwiza

== See also ==
- List of universities in Zimbabwe
- Education in Zimbabwe
