= Memry Savanhu =

Zimbabwe-born Nollywood actress, filmmaker and entrepreneur

- Born: Zimbabwe
- Education: New York Film Academy
- Occupations: Actress; filmmaker
- Years active: 2008-present

Memry Savanhu is a Zimbabwean Nollywood actress and filmmaker. She made her debut with Distance Between (2008), and had starred in One Fine Day, On Bended Knees and '76. She is the founder of Memkay Productions, a film production outfit.

== Life and education ==
In an interview with the Nigerian Guardian Newspaper Savanhu stated she was born in Zimbabwe and revealed that she is of Zezuru ethnicity. She studied drama in London and at the New York Film Academy in Abu Dhabi, UAE studied filmmaking.

== Career ==
Savanhu had her earliest film production directed by Izu Ojukwu titled, Distance Between, in 2008 featuring Rita Dominic, Mercy Johnson, Kalu Ikeagwu and Yemi Blaq. Among her subsequent notable productions are One Fine Day, Cougars Reloaded, Catwalq and On Bended Knees. She was featured as "Eunice" in Izu Ojukwu's 2016 historical war drama, '76. Also featured were: Rita Dominic, Ramsey Nouah, Chidi Mokeme, Ibinabo Fiberesima and Daniel K. Daniel. The film had its premiere in Nigeria on November 3, 2016.

In 2014, she was nominated in the "Best Actor UK Female" category of the global Zulu African Academy Awards (ZAFAA), held in London, UK for her role in the film, Maria's Vision.

In 2015, she was nominated for the Zimbabwe International Women's Awards (ZIWA) held in Birmingham, UK in October of that year as reported by The Herald of Zimbabwe. This award is for her contribution to the Nollywood, according to Youth Village.

== Filmatography ==
=== Film ===
Year	Film	Role	Notes	Ref.
2016	'76	Actress (Eunice)	Drama, Romance	
2015	One Fine Day	Actress	Drama, Romance	
2014	Maria's Vision	Actress (Maria)	Romance, Drama	
2013	On Bended Knees	Actress	Drama	
2009	Nnenda	Actress	Drama	
2008	Distance Between	Producer	Romance, Drama	

=== Television series ===
Year	Film	Role	Notes	Ref.
2012 -	Catwalq (also Lagos Catwalk)	Actress	TV series, Soap opera, Drama	

== Accolades ==
Year	Event	Prize	Recipient	Result
2015	ZIWA	Nollywood contribution	Herself	Nominated
2014	ZAFAA	Best Actor UK Female	Herself	Nominated

== Personal life ==
Pulse Nigeria gathered that Savanhu is divorced and has two children.
