= Mai Tt =

Zimbabwean comedian, socialite and recording artist

Felistas Murata
- Born: 2 July 1986 (age 39); Harare, Zimbabwe
- Other names: Mai Tt
- Citizenship: Zimbabwean
- Occupations: Socialite; Actress; Musician
- Years active: 2016-present
- Known for: Comedy, Music
- Children: 2

Felistas Murata is a Zimbabwean comedian, socialite, activist, actress, and recording artist who performs under the stage name Mai Tt. She rose to prominence in 2016 through social media comedy skits, after initially beginning her career as a gospel musician. Murata is also known for her advocacy for the rights of people living with HIV/AIDS.

== Background ==
Murata attended her early education at Mufakose and Glenview High School.

== Career ==
In 2020, she was cast in the Tanzanian film A Life of Regret, though she later withdrew after disputes over payments.

=== Film comeback (2025) ===
In 2025, Mai Tt returned to acting with the Nollywood–Zimbabwean co-production Lost in Ashes. The premiere took place in Harare and featured several well-known Nollywood actors who flew in for the launch.

The cast included:

- Felistas “Mai Tt” Murata – lead actress, with the story partly based on her own life.
- Mike Ezuruonye – Nigerian actor, recognised for roles in Nollywood blockbusters.
- Mike Godson – Nigerian actor known for romantic dramas.
- Chinyere Wilfred – veteran Nollywood actress, often cast in motherly roles.
- Anita Joseph – Nollywood actress and entertainer.
- Joy Patrick Ezedike – Nollywood actress who joined the cast.
- Iyke Odife – Nigerian film director and actor.
- Flossy Florento – Nollywood actress who appeared at the Harare launch.

The movie was received positively by fans and critics, with media praising Mai Tt for “reinventing herself” after earlier controversies.

== Awards and recognition ==
- 2018 – Top Female Entertainment and Social Media Enterprise and Business Leader of the Year (Women’s Heritage Society World Organisation).
- 2019 – Finalist in Africa’s Most Influential Women in Business and Government (Pan African Awards).
- 2020 – Nominated for SADC Community Champion Awards for work with Mai Ts Diaries Foundation.

== Discography ==
- Ndinouya Ikoko (2017)
- Dzora Mwoyo (2017)
- Kereke Dhukeke (2018)
- Makatendeka (2019)
- Ngithande ft Dereck Mpofu (2019)
- Waridongorera ft Mathias Mhere (2019)
- No Other Name (2020)
- Letting You Go ft Kazz Khalif (2020)
- Nyarara ft Lamont Chitepo (2020)
- Dzoka Undinyepere (2020)
- Hush ft Tocky Vibes (2020)
- Sheriyo (2020)
- Rita x Baba Harare (2021)
- Mwari Makanaka (2022)
