= Emilio J. M. de Carvalho =

Emilio J. M. de Carvalho is a retired Angolan Bishop of the United Methodist Church, elected to that office in 1972.

Emilio was born August 3, 1933, in Quiongua, Malanje, Angola. Carvalho earned his B.D in December 1958 at the Faculdade de Teologia da Igreja Methodista in São Paulo, Brazil. At the same time, he served as the assistant pastor for two local churches. Carvalho later earned a M.A. degree from Garrett-Evangelical Theological Seminary and Northwestern University (June 1960). Carvalho was ordained a deacon in The Methodist Church on June 3, 1960, by Bishop H.C. Northcott at the Wisconsin Annual Conference. He was the first indigenous Angolan to achieve that level of theological education. The Rev. de Carvalho returned to Angola and was appointed pastor of the Central Methodist Church in Luanda.

The Angolan War of Independence against colonial rule by Portugal began in early 1961. Carvalho was imprisoned by the colonial secret police from April 1961 to August 1963. In 1965, he became a professor and the principal of the Emmanuel Theological Seminary in Dondi, Angola. He was ordained an elder in The Methodist Church 2 January 1966 by Bishop H.P. Andreassen at the Angola Annual Conference.

Rev. Emilio J. M. de Carvalho was elected to the episcopacy of the United Methodist Church at the Africa Central Conference session held in Limbe, Malawi, August 1972. He was consecrated a bishop by Bishop Escrivao A. Zunguze on October 21, 1972, in Luanda. Bishop de Carvalho was assigned the Angola episcopal area. In 1974 a new government in Portugal decided to withdraw from all its African colonies, leading to independence for Angola in 1975 but also to a civil war that continued until 2002.

In 1984, speaking to the General Board of Higher Education and Ministry of the United Methodist Church, Carvalho proposed the creation of a Methodist university in Africa for students from all of Africa. The 1988 General Conference approved creating Africa University, and classes began in 1992. Carvalho formally retired on September 1, 2000.

== See also ==
- List of bishops of the United Methodist Church
