= Glanis Changachirere =

Zimbabwean women's rights activist (born 1983)

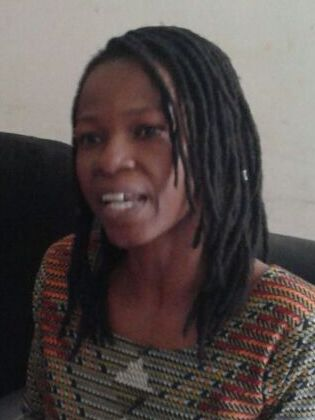
- Born: 1983 (age 42–43); Mashonaland Central Province, Zimbabwe
- Education: University of Birmingham, Africa University
- Occupation: Women's rights activist
- Known for: Founded Young Women Development (IYWD), Africa Women Leader's Forum

Glanis Changachirere (born 1983, Mashonaland Central Province, Zimbabwe) is a Zimbabwean women's rights activist. She is the founding Director of the Institute for Young Women Development (IYWD) and the founding Coordinator of the African Women Leaders Forum. She is also a member of the Steering Committee of the Zimbabwean chapter of the UN Women-supported African Women Leaders Network as of March 2022.

== Background and education ==
Glanis Changachirere was born in rural communal lands of Mashonaland Central Province of Zimbabwe in 1983. Changachirere holds a Masters in International Relations (Gender), Politics and International Relations from the University of Birmingham and Masters in Public Policy and Governance from Africa University. She also holds a Communications and Social Media award from the St. Francis Xavier University. She is a 2018/2019 Chevening Scholar in International Relations (Gender).

== Career ==
Glanis Changachirere was the Gender and Human Rights Programs Officer at the Youth Non-Profit Organization. She is also a Steering Committee Member of the World Movement for Democracy since 2015. She is also the Director Institute for Young Women Development from 2009. Glanis Changachirere is the Regional coordinator African Women Leaders Forum from 2015 to present. She is also one of five Judges for the Politician of the Year Award 2022.

Changachirere’s research interests include politics, gender, public policy, and feminist international relations. They also teach pathways to research alongside the politics of global development.

== Awards ==
In 2013, Changachirere received the 30 Under 30 Democracy Award from the National Endowment for Democracy in recognition of her pioneering work on young women's political participation. In 2016, she was selected for a Reagan–Fascell Democracy Fellowship at the National Endowment for Democracy. She has also been listed among the United Nation Women's Top 10 African Women.

== Activism ==
Her organization Institute for Young Women Development (IYWD) is a movement of 7,000 young women members across rural and mining communities in the country. The organization is achieving its mission by developing the capacities of young women on human rights and participation, alliance and movement building with strategic stakeholders to challenge and navigate power over, citizen activism and providing active solidarity to community activists and other likeminded individuals and organizations. At the national level, IYWD is working with the Zimbabwe Gender Commission to introduce a Gender Equality Bill to challenge the cultural inequalities and injustices borne by young women in the country. She is also an advocate for gender based violence in her home country, Zimbabwe.
