= Prag Lalloo Naran =

Zimbabwean politician

- Born: July 26, 1926; Southern Rhodesia
- Died: May 9, 1981 (aged 54); Zimbabwe
- Education: Businessman, Philanthropist and Nationalist
- Known for: Nationalist for the struggle for Zimbabwe’s independence,” and a “leading member of the (Zimbabwe) Asian Community”
- Children: Hashmook Naran, Kumar Naran, Harish Naran, Damyanti Naran, Ramesh Naran Grandchildren: Ameerh Naran, Vayshalee Naran, Kiran Naran, Shaan Naran

Prag Lalloo Naran (26 July 1926 – 9 May 1981) was a Zimbabwean politician and businessman recognized as a "Nationalist for the struggle for Zimbabwe’s independence," and a "leading member of the (Zimbabwe) Asian Community".

== Political career and affiliations ==
During Zimbabwe's struggle for independence Prag Lalloo Naran supported the struggle for majority rule, backing the formation of key institutions such as the Rhodesian African Teachers Association.

Naran provided a substantial grant at its inception and is credited with helping to launch the association along with a group of men, which includes the now celebrated politician Cephas G. Msipa. RATA was not only important for the role it played in promoting African teachers rights but also the important political figures it supported and introduced to Zimbabweans; the most prominent of which was Robert Gabriel Mugabe newly returned from Ghana.

Naran was a vocal advocate for peace and equality. He was a member of the Capricorn Africa Society'. He was a prominent business man. One of his business ventures was an upmarket hotel that he bought in Queque (KweKwe), however by law a certain section of the hotel was available to white people only and even though he owned the hotel he would not be permitted to enter part of his own building. The racial inequality in Rhodesia did not sit well with Naran, who authored several letters to prominent newspapers. He openly denounced racial prejudice and discrimination in public meetings and called for African and Asians to work together.

Naran regionally, spread his message for equality across Zambia and beyond. He was instrumental in harboring at that time freedom fighters and sponsoring them. He also attended the Lancaster House talks in 1979 in London, England which led the country into being an independent majority rule Zimbabwe Republic.

== Charity and social contributions ==
Community involvement was important to Naran, especially supporting the less fortunate individuals. He was the founder of Jairos Jiri Centre in Gweru (previously Gwelo). The Jairos Jiri Gweru Centre is named after his father Lalloo Naran and was established in 1968 with the aim to re-habilitate, educate and integrate young handicapped people into the local community.

Naran was also active in assisting and promoting Hopelands (now part of Zimcare Trust); an organisation which supports children with mental and physical disabilities.

A Great sportsman Naran introduced sports and cultural activities in Kwekwe serving as chairman for :

- The National Football League Midlands Province (11 years)
- Boy Scout Association of Kwekwe
- Kwekwe Queens Sports Club

== Business and development of Kwekwe (Queque) ==
In 1961, Prag Naran opened the largest department store in Kwekwe (Queque).

One of Naran's companies Beverly Hills Investments (M.D) funded the development of a new residential suburb in Kwekwe (Queque), creating jobs and bolstering local industry. Naran also served as President and Vice President of the Kwekwe (Queque) Chamber of Commerce. He partnered with local communities investing in agricultural land within Midlands and further afield as far as Chiredzi. He invested in the town of Redcliff investing in hotel, land and property. He invested in the Iron and Steel centre of Zimbabwe, Redcliff, where he built the residential township, a hotel and upmarket supermarket for the convenience of the 1200 workers in the mine and their families. He then bought into a shoe factory in Harare called Rhodesian Shoe Manufacturing, now known as Conte Shoes.

Naran invested heavily in property in Zimbabwe. He acquired over half of the land in the city of Kwekwe (Queque) for commercial and residential property development, farming and mining as well as significant property portfolio in Kadoma, Chiredzi and Harare.

In 1972 Naran established a steel bedding factory in Francistown, Botswana.

== Background ==
Naran's father, Shri Lalloo Naran was a cobbler by profession and opened the Naran family's first modest store in Kwekwe (Queque) (which Prag expanded upon). Naran married Padmani Mistry and settled in the town of Kwekwe (Queque). The couple had four sons; Kumar, Hasmook, Harish and Ramesh and a daughter; Damyanti.

== See also ==
- History of Zimbabwe
- Lancaster House Agreement
- Rhodesia's Unilateral Declaration of Independence
