= '76 (film) =

2016 film directed by Izu Ojukwu

- Theatrical release poster
- Directed by: Izu Ojukwu
- Screenplay by: Emmanuel Okomanyi
- Produced by: Adonaijah Owiriwa; Izu Ojukwu; Tonye Princewill
- Starring: Ramsey Nouah; Chidi Mokeme; Rita Dominic; Ibinabo Fiberesima
- Cinematography: Yinka Edward
- Edited by: Emeka Ojukwu
- Production companies: Adonis Productions; Princewill's Trust
- Release date: 25 November 2016
- Country: Nigeria
- Languages: English; Igbo
- Budget: ₦600 million ($3 million)

'76, formerly Lions of '76, is a 2016 Nigerian historical fiction drama film directed by Izu Ojukwu and produced by Adonaijah Owiriwa and Izu Ojukwu. It stars Ramsey Nouah, Chidi Mokeme, Rita Dominic and Ibinabo Fiberesima.

Set six years after the Nigerian Civil War, a young officer from the Middle Belt gets into a romantic relationship with an O-level student from the South-eastern region. However, their relationship is strained by constant military postings. The soldier gets accused of being involved in the unsuccessful 1976 military coup and assassination of General Murtala Mohammed and the heavily pregnant wife gets entangled in an emotional dilemma.

The historical account in '76 went through a seven-month approval period at the Nigerian Military before filming started. The film, which is set in the 1970s, was shot in Ibadan, Oyo. The film, which was shot on 16-millimeter film with an Arriflex 416 camera, was in production for about five years.

== Plot ==
In 1976, Captain Joseph Dewa is living with his pregnant girlfriend, Suzy, inside an army barracks. Dewa is elusive about his family, while Suzy’s does not accept him.

One night, Dewa is approached by Gomos, a friend in the army, who wants to recruit him for an upcoming coup plot, codenamed Operation Lion’s Den, that will involve the assassination of the Head of State. Dewa refuses to join and escapes from Gomos’ lair. The next day, Dewa tries to warn his CO about the plot, but finds that he is part of the conspiracy. The CO locks down the garrison to prevent his escape, but Dewa eludes the plotters and slips a note to a trusted colleague, Obi, warning Suzy about his situation. Obi arrives at Dewa’s house, but is arrested by the conspirators in front of Suzy before he could reveal anything. Dewa manages to arrive home in the evening, but gets into a fight with Suzy, who believes he is having an affair. They hear news of the assassination, the coup and its defeat over the radio. Suzy goes into stress-induced labor, but when Dewa goes outside to find help, he is arrested by loyalist officers led by Jaiye who claim to have found his identification documents among the conspirators.

Suzy gives birth in a hospital with the help of Jaiye and Dewa’s aunt Mary, but is not allowed to see her partner. Meanwhile, Dewa is interrogated by Jaiye over his involvement in the coup, but fails to prove his innocence after he fails to find his ID card during a search of his house. Gomos is also arrested, bur refuses to speak about Dewa during torture. Suzy is later released and placed under surveillance. Jaiye later tries to convince Suzy that Dewa is unfaithful to him by showing pictures and images of another woman, Angelina, to whom Dewa is purportedly engaged. Suzy breaks down, but later gets confused when Angelina arrives and introduces herself as Dewa’s estranged sister, who seeks to reconcile with Joseph after learning that he would become a father.

Suzy visits Mary, who tells her that one of the accused had been released after showing his ID card. Suzy then searches for Dewa’s ID and finds it hidden in her purse, but Jaiye dismisses her as the card is now moot. Suzy recalls Obi’s arrest and reaches out to him, learning the truth. Obi finally tells Jaiye what really happened, but the latter dismisses him with a verbal reprimand.

As the execution of the plotters is announced, Suzy goes to Lagos in the hopes of seeing Dewa one last time, but does not see him. Back home, a badly-injured Dewa shows up before Suzy and Angelina and meets his infant daughter for the first time. As Dewa is dismissed from the army, the couple move out of the barracks.

== Cast ==
- Ramsey Nouah as Captain Joseph Dewa
- Chidi Mokeme as Major Gomos
- Rita Dominic as Suzie
- Ibinabo Fiberesima as Angelina
- Daniel K. Daniel as CPL Obi
- Memry Savanhu as Eunice
- Adonijah Owiriwa as Captain V. M. Jaiye
- Pat Nebo as Colonel Aliu
- Nelly Ekwereogo as Ikenna
- Shuaibu Ebenesi Adams as Lieutenant Jubril
- Debo Oguns as Noel

== Production ==
Ojukwu always had fantasies about making military movies, so much that he followed many coup stories. When the '76 project came along, he had to do a lot more readings and research, and also consult scholars on the crucial aspects of the story, to ensure historical accuracy; over a year was spent on the pre-production stage of the film. The historical account of '76 had the support of the Nigerian Military, as the script went through a seven-month investigation and approval period before filming started. The military also assigned personnel to train the actors and guide the military aspect of the film. During the film's development, the director tried to minimize violence as he wanted people to focus on the story and not get distracted or pissed off by gory images. Eight period cars of the 1970s were refurbished to be used in the film.

Filming took place mainly at Mokola Barracks, Ibadan, Oyo. The film was shot using Arriflex 416 Super 16 cameras; It was initially meant to be shot on 35mm film, but the ground glass of one of the cameras to be used got damaged. As a result, the director opted to shoot on 16mm film instead. The film stock used for filming, along with other equipment used for production, were subsidized by the Nigerian Film Corporation. After over four months on set, Principal photography was concluded during July 2012.

== Release ==
A teaser trailer was released to the public on 20 November 2012 The release was initially slated for 4 October 2013, but it was pushed back indefinitely due to delayed post production. A first official trailer for the film was released on 14 November 2014. The film was selected to premiere at the Toronto International film Festival during September 2016, and at the BFI London Film Festival. The film was released on 25 November 2016.

== Themes ==
Izu Ojukwu stated that "it's a story told from a dual point of view—from the soldier's patriotic perspective and from that of the officer's wives." Ojukwu also made it clear that the film paid homage to the strength of soldiers' wives: "As far as I'm concerned, the wives are the real soldiers.... They are the ones who suffer from whatever decisions their husbands make—whether on the battlefield or within their office complexes."

Issues reflected in the film include the rumours of foreign involvement in Murtala Muhammed's coup. Ojukwu stated: "You cannot run away from them.... You must deal with all the rumours—although we cannot say, factually, what happened...." The film also strongly portrayed intertribal marriages; '76 is set six years after the Nigerian Civil War, and, according to the director, this was an era when the Nigerian people started playing down on all forms of discrimination and saw themselves more as brothers and sisters.
