= Ibinabo Fiberesima =

Nigerian actress and model

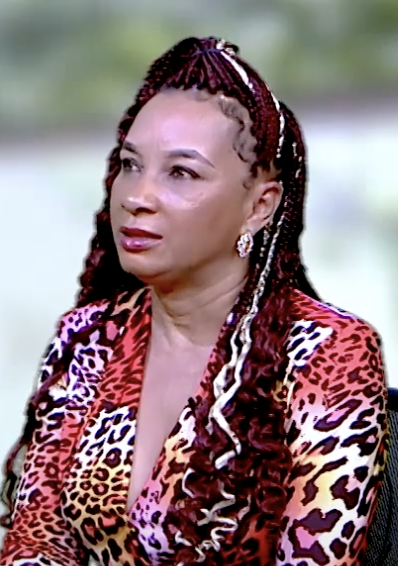
- Born: January 13, 1970 (age 56); Port Harcourt, Rivers State, Nigeria
- Education: University of Ibadan
- Occupations: film actress; director; producer; event manager
- Years active: 1997–present

Ibinabo Fiberesima (born 13 January 1970) is a Nigerian film actress, director, producer, ex-beauty queen and event manager. She is a former president of the Actors Guild of Nigeria.

== Early life and education ==
Born to a Nigerian father and an Irish mother, Ibinabo began her education when she enrolled as a student at the Y.M.C.A Play Centre, Port Harcourt before she proceeded with her secondary school education at Federal Government Girls College, New Bussa, Niger State, northern Nigeria. She holds a Bachelor of Arts certificate in English Language and Literature which she obtained from the University of Ibadan. She proceeded to earn a Master's Degree in Audio Visual Management from the Media Business School Ronda, Spain. She is an Actor, Director, Environmental Advocate and Event Planner. Ibinabo Fiberesima started out as a model and ended that path with an enviable glut of modeling awards. She was the 1st runner up, Miss Nigeria, 1991, and 2nd runner up at the Most Beautiful Girl in Nigeria (MBGN) beauty pageants. She was named Miss Wonderland in 1990, before delving into the movie industry making her debut in 1998 with the Action Thriller MOST WANTED to commence a career in acting. Ibinabo Fiberesima went on to become the first female President of the Actors Guild of Nigeria, AGN, and has made her directorial debut with her two movies MIEBAKA and ALONG CAME A BUTTERFLY. She is currently a Brand Ambassador for Air Peace and Image Make-Up Nigeria. She is also the National Director of Miss Earth Nigeria Beauty Pageant, which she has overseen since 2002. She enjoys swimming, acting, reading, cooking, and traveling and is desirous of more trees and a better ecosystem.

== Career ==
=== Pageantry ===
Ibinabo participated in the 1991 edition of the Miss Nigeria beauty pageant. She was named as the first runner-up to winner Bibiana Ohio. Before this, she had won the Miss Wonderland contest in 1990, and in that same year, was first runner-up at the Miss NUGA competition held at the University of Calabar in Cross River State, Nigeria.

In 1990, she competed in the Most Beautiful Girl in Nigeria (MBGN) pageant for the first time, where she placed as the second runner-up. In 1997, she competed and emerged first runner-up of the 1997 edition of Miss Nigeria before she went on to be crowned winner of Miss Wonderful that same year. She was also second runner-up for the Most Beautiful Girl in Nigeria in 1998.

=== Acting ===
Ibinabo made her debut as a film actress in the movie Most Wanted and has since gone on to star in several Nigerian films. she was one of the actresses on Passion of Mary Slessor.

== Controversy ==
In 2009, Ibinabo was charged with manslaughter and reckless driving after she accidentally killed a certain Giwa Suraj in 2006. On 16 March 2016, Ibinabo was sacked as President of the Actors Guild of Nigeria and sentenced to a 5-year jail term by a Federal High Court sitting in Lagos. She was however granted bail for ₦2 million and two sureties in like sum on 7 April 2016, by a Court of Appeal in Lagos pending the determination of her appeal at the Supreme Court.

== Filmography ==
- Most Wanted (1998) as Sparkle
- The Ghost (2005) as Rose
- St. Mary (2014) as Doofan
- The Twin Sword (2012)
- 2 Face (2005)
- Mortal Sin (2003) as Rita
- Letters to a Stranger (2007) as Kemi
- '76 (2016) as Angelina
- Rivers Between
- A Night In The Philippines (2005)
- Pastor's Wife
- Camouflage (2005)
- All My Heart (2005)
