= Jairos Jiri =

Rhodesian disability activist (1921–1982)

Jairos Jiri MBE (26 June 1921 – 12 November 1982) was born in the district of Bikita, then Southern Rhodesia now Zimbabwe. He was also known respectfully as Baba, which means Father in his Shona culture.

== History ==
Baba Jiri was born in 1926. In the early days of his childhood, he had a dream of helping disabled people. These dreams were motivated by his family background. His father, Chief Mutenyami Jiri was an Appointer of Rozvi Chiefs. The Rozvi Empire ruled the Shona Dzimbabwe (now Zimbabwe) until the death of the last Shona King Tohwechipi Chibhamubhamu in Uhera (now Buhera) in 1873. He is buried in the Mavangwe Hills and his grave is a national monument. As Royal people, people like Chief Mutenyami would not only appoint chiefs but provide social services in the community like feeding the hungry. His mother, Mai Marufu came from a royal family too and was charitable as was expected of her role. Mai Marufu was the daughter of the sub-chief Mazimba of Gutu. As expected of Royal Rozvi, Baba Jiri's family was a spiritual and valued family and community. They prayed to Mwari (God) and respected their elders. Jairos grew up herding cattle and learning to write in the sand with sticks or his fingers or on rocks with charcoal. His community was poor and overcrowded after people were moved by white settlers from good land a few decades before he was born. His family and many others in Bikita Reserve struggled to take care of themselves as they did not have good and large enough land to farm.

No doubt this background influenced Jairos's view of life when he saw destitute people on the streets of Masvingo (then Fort Victoria) where he worked briefly and in Bulawayo where he arrived on foot from Masvingo in 1939 with his brother Mazviyo Jiri. It was in Bulawayo where he came across more destitute people. Some of the people he saw were half-naked, blind, or disabled, and they were begging. This situation was very different from life in his village were any people needing this kind of help were assisted not to live a harsh kind of life. He was motivated to help, but he was only a gardener working for white families and at times a newspaper vendor or deliverer who used an employer's bicycle. He helped in small ways nevertheless.

Around the 1940s, he joined the Rhodesian Africa Rifles as a dishwasher. This was during World War II. The facility where he worked rehabilitated soldiers injured in war. He observed rehabilitation workers, and doctors and this left him with ideas about rehabilitation. This experience shaped his rehabilitation model. One day, it is reported that he used his worker's bicycle to carry a disabled young man to Old Memorial Hospital, persuaded the hospital to do corrective surgery which he paid for from his meager earnings. He did not stop there but took beggars who were blind from the streets of Bulawayo to his lodgings.

He created backyard facilities in the 1940s for disadvantaged and disabled people in Rhodesia/Zimbabwe. His inspiration came from unhu (also known as Ubuntu) values of helping, giving, friendship, being good in the community, and working and doing work that please Mwari (God). He was probably also motivated by Christian principles of charity, patience, and non-judgmental tolerance that he gained from Gokomere Mission School where he attended school for a few days before falling sick and returning home.

The experience led him to register the first disability organisation by a black person in Zimbabwe. The organisation was registered as Bulawayo and Bikita Physically Defective Society, but later changed to Jairos Jiri Association for the Rehabilitation of the Disabled and the Blind. Initial attempts to register were dismissed by the colonial administrators who thought his ideas were wild. He had to overcome numerous bureaucratic hurdles as a black person registering a first charity organization in colonial Rhodesia. The Jairos Jiri Association was founded in Bulawayo in 1950. The first committee was made up of Stephen Kwenda (Secretary), Fabian Dururu (Treasurer), and members Job Mapfinya and Jacob Mufute. After hard years of setting up a new organisation, in 1950 the first skills training workshop was held with the support of Bulawayo City Council. In 1959, he opened a training center in Nguboyenja. This was followed by a tour of rehabilitation facilities in the United States and Europe supported by donors. He expanded his work to Harare (then Salisbury) after getting land from Salisbury City Council.

The art center outlet for the association quickly achieved prominence and by the 1960s was a prime source of curios for tourists. These items were made by disabled people and included tiles and tiled tables and wall plaques, carvings, pottery, painted artworks, and sculptures. His rehabilitation center in Bulawayo also fostered music and dance resulting in bands like the Jairos Jiri band popularised by Paul Matavire who was blind. By 1974 the centers had expanded and diversified to include homes for the disabled, and legal representation was gained locally and in the United Kingdom. Jairos Jiri centers and his philosophy are still a major resource for community action and charity in Zimbabwe.

== Baba Jairos Jiri's Charity Model ==
Mr Jiri's work charity model was replicated by several organizations in Zimbabwe. His model can be described by the acronym HOPESS as follows:

1. Have values of hunhu (hunhu means ubuntu).
2. Observe the environment for opportunities to helping.
3. Provide help using your own physical, financial and other resources.
4. Encourage and treat people you want to help as your friends and family.
5. Seek outside help.
6. Start and sustain a charity organization.

== Baba Jairos Jiri's Disability and Rehabilitation Model ==
Baba Jiri's rehabilitation work can be described as follows:

- Encourage and treat people you want to help as friends or family, that is, be their parent.
- Use existing facilities and resources, for example, work together with friends, family, community, and use local resources at hospitals and clinics.
- Provide resources, e.g. take people to facilities because they may not be able to go on their own.
- Provide ideas about how rehabilitation could be done, that is, be an active carer.
- Provide accommodation (institutionalization) to reduce stigma and cost of care.
- Provide training and income opportunities like enterprises.

This model has been referred to by the acronym TO-PARENT as shown in the table below:

Jiri's TO-PARENT model of disability and rehabilitation
Letter	Description
T	Take people you want to help as your friends or family (ukama).
O	Only use existing facilities like friends, hospitals and homes (ujamaa).
P	Provide resources like transport people to facilities because they may not be able to go on their own.
A	Adequate care, education and support. Provide practical ideas about how rehabilitation could be done.
R	Reduce stigma and cost of care by providing housing (institutionalization).
E	Enterprises (ushavi) for income.
N	Need for supporting carers like his wife and friends.
T	Training opportunities for self-reliance.

The major strengths of his model are that it supports the building of skills and income but a major weakness in institutionalization because resources like food are limited. Further once institutionalized, people are separated from the community and it becomes very difficult for them to thrive in those communities when they go back. This model does not address the structural issues that cause disability, exclusion, and injustice. However, the work that he started has changed to include community work and advocacy for social inclusion.

== Awards in Zimbabwe ==
Getting recognized by the name Baba on a national scale is not an easy thing to achieve in Zimbabwe. That respect is given to people who have played a major role in nation building. Baba Jiri was honored by Zimbabweans who refer to him as Baba, meaning Respected Father. In 1982 when he died, he was honored with National Hero of Zimbabwe status but opted to be buried in his home village of Bikita instead of at the National Heroes Acre in Harare. Being buried in the village among your other deceased family members is a key unhu value. Later, the government of Zimbabwe honored him by naming an award in his name, The Jairos Jiri Humanitarian Award given to people who contribute significantly to helping others, for example, those who helped Cyclone Idai victims in Chimanimani in 2019. In 1977, he was awarded an Honours Degree in Masters of Arts by the then University of Rhodesia.

== International awards ==
In 1959, the Queen of the United Kingdom awarded Mr. Jiri an MBE, which means Member of the British Empire. Other awards included:

1. International Symposium on Rehabilitation awarded in Kampala, Uganda in 1975.
2. Audience with Pope Paul VI, where he received a blessing for his great work and was presented with a medal marking a Holy year in 1975.
3. Lions International Service Award in 1977.
4. Humanitarian Award from the then Salisbury Union of Jewish Women in 1977.
5. Freedom of the City of Los Angeles in 1981.
6. Goodwill Industries International Award for Humanitarian and Rehabilitation Work in 1981.
7. Rotary International presented him with their International Year of Disabled Person Award for Africa which carries the citation “Greatest Contribution to Rehabilitation in Africa - IYDP 1981”.

== Birth of the Zimbabwe disability movement ==
The Zimbabwean disability movement for equality was born in institutions run by Jairos Jiri in 1975 but he did not support it. Like many people at that time, he saw the call for involvement, participation, and increased opportunities as a threat to his charity model. The movement emanated from people like Joshua Malinga who went on to become a politician against while rule and Mayor of Bulawayo from 1993-1995. The activists formed and registered the National Council of Disabled Persons Zimbabwe which started as Kubatsirana Welfare Society later National Council for the Welfare of Disabled while still in the institutions. In 1980, Malinga attended an international disability congress, Disabled Peoples' International’s Winnipeg World Congress in Canada. This marked internationalization of disability work in Zimbabwe.

== Legacy ==
At the time of his death, the Association, which Mr. Jiri founded, had grown from 1 center in 1950 to 16 centers including schools, special schools for the deaf and blind, hostels and homes, vocational training center, agriculture skills training center, clinics, orthopedic workshops and satellite units, Community-based Rehabilitation Programme, craft shops and gender empowerment programs. "(Baba)Jairos Jiri not only gave hope and opportunity to thousands of people living with disabilities during his lifetime and after his death, but also earned Zimbabwe international recognition in the care and rehabilitation of the disabled. It takes a man of great compassion and courage to assume responsibility for such people and to break down the barriers and attitudes of society towards them, and in doing so, restore to human dignity and rightful place in the community. He has left a tangible legacy to the nation and all of us inherit the Jairos Jiri Association with gratitude and pride in its achievements to date".

== Family ==
Jairos Jiri had 18 children in total and was divorced three times. He lived with his last wife Ethel Jiri, their seven daughters: Patricia, Patience, Precious, Primrose, Priscilla, Penelope Pamela who was 11 days old when he died in 1982. One of his sons, Last was involved in the Jairos Jiri Family Trust. Ethel Jiri died from throat cancer and was buried alongside her husband in Bikita – Mutenyami village. Jairos Jiri was supposed to be buried at the recently established National Heroes Acre in Harare but his brother Ziwumbwa opted to have him buried in the village alongside his people, a key ubuntu value. Jairos was buried in the Mutenyami Village in Bikita and the burial was attended by prominent people including the then Prime Minister of Zimbabwe, Robert Gabriel Mugabe and by the then Deputy Prime Minister the late Comrade Simon Muzenda

== Foundational Contribution and Legacy of Betty Jiri ==
Betty Jiri nee Mtsuka Dlamini Ndlela (born c. 1939, born Beti Mandiera) was the sole co-founding wife of the Jairos Jiri Association, establishing a separate, distinct historical legacy as a pioneer of disability rights and social development in Zimbabwe. Characterized as a spiritual journey rooted in divine obedience rather than financial gain, her work began from a position of minimal resources before the formal establishment of institutional facilities. The humanitarian mission initially began within their domestic space only after Jairos Jiri formally sought her consent and approval to accommodate individuals with disabilities in their home. Throughout their marriage, he continuously sought her executive consent for major decisions and supported her leadership until his death in 1982. Beginning in 1953 from a single room at Mzilikazi Q Square in Bulawayo, she served as the association's first female carer, managing the primary domestic care, cooking, cleaning, and sanitization duties for the initial residents while the project operated entirely without institutional funding. During periods when Jairos Jiri was absent, she managed the daily operations independently. As the numbers of people seeking assistance increased and space became constrained, she physically assisted in constructing early pole-and-dagga shelters on land donated by the Bulawayo local city council in Nguboyenja, laying the groundwork for the 1958 opening of the structured Nguboyenja rehabilitation care centre. This foundational era of joint partnership culminated in major international milestones for the movement, including Jairos Jiri receiving the Queen Elizabeth MBE award for services to the disabled.

During an era when prevailing legal and institutional frameworks systematically restricted Black women from registering assets, property, or corporate status in their own individual names, the Jairos Jiri Association actively advanced principles of gender equality and democratic governance by formally recognizing her as an executive equal. Long before Jairos Jiri's death in 1982, the association's leadership structure formally valued her foundational labor by designating her as a founding trustee and Vice-President, granting her full executive voting rights on the council to manage the expanding network of centers. Her active authority in executive governance was demonstrated by the requirement of her formal consent for major administrative actions, including the mutually agreed relocation of the Kadoma centre in 1981, which she had co-established. In addition to her administrative and physical labor, she parented seven children with Jairos Jiri (Tendayi Clarah, Crispen, Claudius, Clemence, Peter, Simbarashe, and Stanley), balancing the care of her biological family alongside the children with disabilities housed by the association through backyard vegetable gardening to sustain the combined household. As of 2025, four of her seven children survive alongside 34 grandchildren. Her specific lineage includes her first grandchildren Munyaradzi and her first granddaughter, Veronica Fadzai Pauline Jiri Dlamini Ndlela Chisango Nenguwo Soko Ncube (also known as Gospel Music Psalmist musician Holy Fadzie, Mwenewazvo), who was born in December 1981 and represents the first granddaughter born directly to the co-founding couple prior to Jairos Jiri's death in 1982.

Following Jairos Jiri's death in November 1982, she experienced significant socioeconomic hardships regarding the redistribution of the matrimonial estate and assets, which had been registered under her late husband's name or the association rather than his co-founder. To protect, preserve, and represent the specific legacy of the national centres they co-established together—including branches in Victoria Falls, Nguboyenja, Silobela, Southerton (Harare), Mukwapasi (Rusape), Gweru, and Kadoma—the Holy Betty Foundation was established. The foundation serves to highlight that her foundational operational contributions and leadership over these centres are non-transferable, ensuring her legacy stands separate from branches of the family who were absent during the charity's historic inception. Her role in national development was publicly recognized in August 2025 when Doves Funeral Services extended a lifetime welfare support package, followed by an honor at the Zimbabwe Achievers Awards in September 2025 celebrating her life advocacy for people with disabilities.
