= Jacob Chikuhwa =

Dr. Jacob W. Chikuhwa
- Born: 1940 (age 85–86)
- Occupation: Author
- Website: www.chikuhwa.net/jacob/

Dr. Jacob Wilson Chikuhwa is an author and leading political and cultural historian of Zimbabwe. Now retired and living in Sweden, he is the author of thirteen books on Zimbabwe, and is a lecturer and painter. Chikuhwa also operates the Chiedza Business Consultancy, a company based in Stockholm, Sweden which offers seminars in business management.

== Early years ==
In 1959, Edgar Whitehead's government of Southern Rhodesia banned the ANC (African National Congress) and arrested nearly 500 leaders including one of young Jacob Chikuhwa's teachers. Shortly thereafter, the National Democratic Party against minority rule was formed and lasted less than two years. When the NDP was banned, the Zimbabwe African People's Union (ZAPU) was formed and Jacob Chikuhwa was a member of the youth league involved in political activities against colonial rule.

== In exile ==
Chikuhwa was arrested in 1964 for his involvement in the resistance. Following his release from detention, he escaped into Zambia and later got a scholarship to study in the former Soviet Union where he received degrees in Economics and International Relations from the Kiev Institute of National Economy in Ukraine. Dr. Chikuhwa sought political asylum in Sweden where he attended the University of Stockholm. In the mid-1970s he became the publicity secretary for ZANU in Northern Europe, establishing a monthly Journal Zimbabwe Chimurenga/Impi yeNkululeko (Zimbabwe Revolution). He returned to Zimbabwe in 1981, following decolonization, but left again in 1989 to return to Sweden.

== Zimbabwe historian ==
Because of his close contact with Zimbabwean government officials dating back to his detention and time in exile, Dr. Chikuhwa published his first book on Zimbabwe in 1998. Dr. Chikuhwa was in Zimbabwe when the opposition party, the Movement for Democratic Change (MDC) participated in the June 2000 parliamentary election, and March 2002 presidential election, and has described being tortured by ZANU-PF officials for his MDC involvement during that period. He has since returned to Sweden where he became MDC Representative in Scandinavia and now writes full-time and lectures on Zimbabwe, in the US and Sweden.

== Bibliography ==
- Zimbabwe: The Rise to Nationhood
- Zimbabwe at the Crossroads
- A Crisis of Governance: Zimbabwe
- Zimbabwe: Beyond a School Certificate
- A Cheer for Sanity
- A Thought for the Day
- Shona Proverbs and Parables
- In Communication with the Deceased
- From the Cradle to the Bonfire
- A Handbook in Business Management
- Business Management (A Brief Exposé)
- Zimbabwe: The End of the First Republic
- Sonnets of the Mind
