= George Shire =

George Shire is a Zimbabwean who lives in London in the United Kingdom. He is a veteran of the war to liberate Rhodesia from white minority rule. He has written newspaper articles and participated in television and radio programs defending the actions of Robert Mugabe's government.

He is a retired academic who previously taught at the University of London; the Central Saint Martin, University of the Arts; and the Open University. He has serves on the editorial boards of a number of journals in the fields of politics and culture, such as SOUNDINGS; DarkMatter; and Ecclipses Journal of Creative Research.
