= Jairos Jiri Association =

A philanthropic organisation set up in 1950 in Bulawayo, Rhodesia (now called Zimbabwe) to support and train disadvantaged people. The founder, Jairos Jiri, using Christian principles, wanted to help individuals who previously had been marginalized and rejected. Initially the association supported arts endeavors and training and set up craft outlets selling tourist souvenirs, such as carvings, paintings, tiles and furniture. In the 1970s legal representation and affiliate support groups were founded in the UK. Jairos Jiri Associations now house the disadvantaged, support musical and dance groups, and are a powerful advocacy for those who would otherwise have no voice in Zimbabwe.
