= Steven Chigorimbo =

Zimbabwean actor, producer and director

- Born: 5 April 1951 (age 74)
- Occupations: actor, producer and director
- Notable work: King Solomom's Mine

Steven Chigorimbo (born 5 April 1951) is a Zimbabwean actor, producer and director. He has credits on international films such as Slavers, The Lost City of Gold, King Solomon's Mine, Jake Speed, Incident at Victoria Falls, Quartermaine and Cry Freedom. In Zimbabwe, he is popular for his role in the long running soapie, Studio 263, for which he was also a producer.

== Early life ==
Chigorimbo grew up in Highfield Township, which is considered to be the home of nationalism in Zimbabwe. His talent for acting was nurtured in school and church dramas until he made his break when he was in his 20s. He has been married and divorced three times. He has fourteen children.

== Career ==
In his long career, dating back to the early 1970s, Chigorimbo is regarded as one of Zimbabwe's veteran filmmakers. He has participated in more than one hundred film projects that include short and feature films, as well as soapie dramas. In 2006, the Zimbabwe International Film Festival Trust presented Chigorimbo with a service award to the country's film industry. With his extensive experience Chigorimbo has been fighting for a robust local film industry.
