= Codilia Gapare =

Zimbabwean entrepreneur

- Born: October 16, 1977 (age 48); Harare, Zimbabwe
- Education: Manchester Metropolitan University
- Occupation: Businesswoman
- Employer: C-Lash
- Known for: Invention of artificial Eyelash extensions for cancer patients

Codilia Gapare is a UK based Zimbabwean magistrate and entrepreneur who invented the first ever false lashes range for chemotherapy patients and those suffering hair loss, she is the founder and CEO of C-Lash.

== Early life ==
Codilia was born in Harare on the 16 October 1977. She grew up in the capital city Harare and city of Masvingo. She attended her high school education at Mt Pleasant High in Harare and Masvingo Christian High. In 2020 she received her MBA from Manchester Metropolitan University.

== Career background ==
In 2014 Codilia was diagnosed with cancer, during that time she noticed that there were no fake eyelash options for cancer patients, she then developed an idea of false lashes for cancer patients called 'C-Lash', which she collaborated with beauty brand Eylure in 2016.

The C-Lash product range was released in Boots stores in 2019 and in Walgreens in 2020. In 2019, C-Lash was voted one of the 50 Prima High Street Heroes and Best Lashes in the Red Best of Beauty Awards. In 2020 the product was also launched in, Australia, Norway, Finland, Sweden and Poland.

In 2022, Codilia was appointed to become a Justice of Peace for Engaland and Wales.

== Awards and recognition ==
- 2015 - Won the Salter's Den and Innovator of the Show Awards
- 2019 - Won the Zimbabwe Achievers Awards Innovation award, Enterprise Vision Awards Best of Beauty Award, Red Magazine Best of Beauty, Cosmetic Executive Women New Comer Award (C-Lash), C-Lash - Prima Award, National Diversity Entrepreneur of Excellency Award, Barclays Woman of the Year Nomination 25 Cheshire Heroes of 2019.
- 2020 - Fabulous Beauty Award finalist
- 2021 - She Inspires – Unique Business Award, Association of Master of Business Administration Start-up of the Year Finalist, She Has No Limit – Finalist, Northern Power Women – Finalist.
- 2020 - Was nominated for Cheshire Woman of the Year

In 2018 - 2019 she was invited to join the Centre of Professional Excellence Advisory Board

Codilia sits on the Mind Matters Board of Advisors Cheshire. She was a speaker at MMU Centre of Enterprise, Veturefest, Enterprise Vision Awards - International Women's Day, Cheshire Women's Networking, Women Mean Business London, Colony Networking Event and some other local networking groups.
