= Tonderai Kasu =

Zimbabwean politician

Doctor Tonderai Kasu
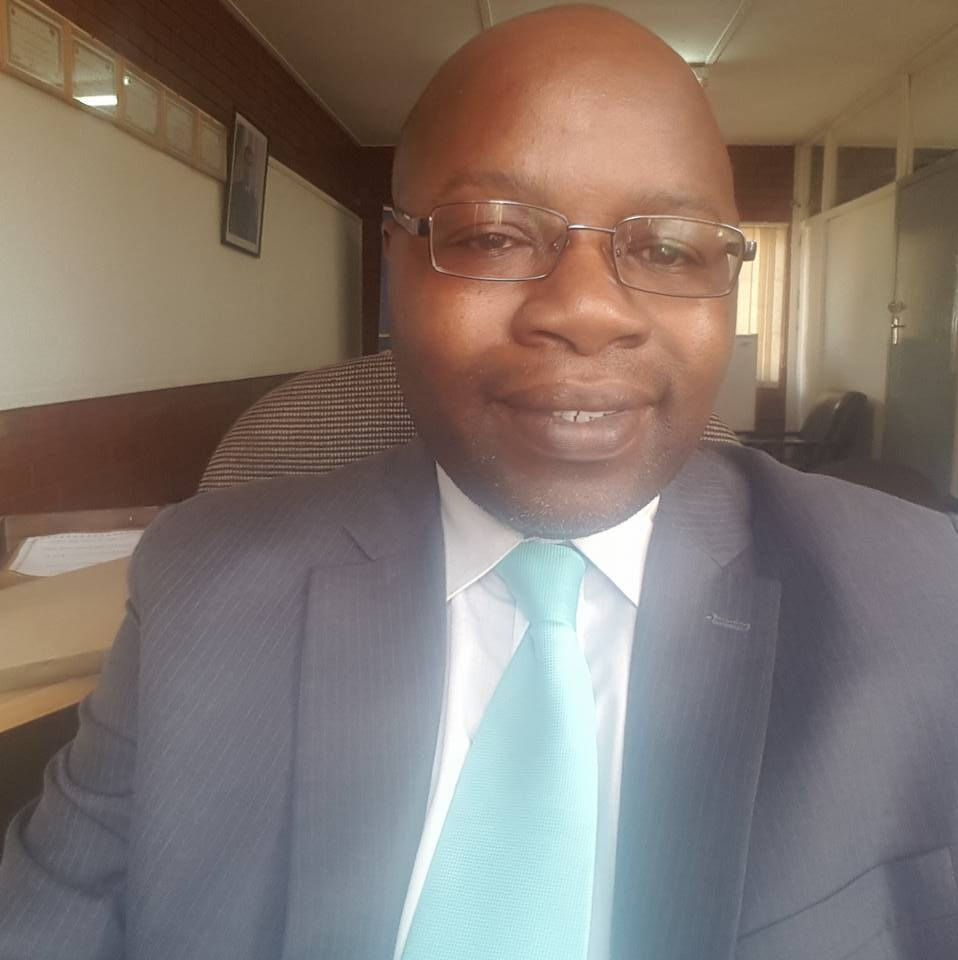
- Born: Tonderai Irvine Tipere Kasu; Salisbury, Southern Rhodesia (modern-day Harare, Zimbabwe)
- Citizenship: Zimbabwean
- Education: Peterhouse Boys' School, University of Zimbabwe, Africa University
- Occupation: Medical Doctor
- Known for: Medicine, Public health, Public administration
- Medical career
- Institutions: Chitungwiza Municipality, St. Anne's Hospital, Africa University
- Research: Public health

Tonderai Kasu is a community and corporate leader in Zimbabwe. A medical doctor by training, he was the substantive Director of Health and Environmental Services for Chitungwiza, and has been the Acting Town Clerk or Acting Chief Executive, of the Chitungwiza Municipality.

== Early life and education ==
Kasu was born in Harare. His family comes from Nyanga, Zimbabwe in Manicaland Province. He is from the Tangwena people, and he bears the same totem or mutupo, as the late Chief Rekayi Tangwena, that is Nhewa or Simboti (leopard). Kasu attended Peterhouse Boys' School near Marondera. He qualified as a medical doctor from the University of Zimbabwe. He holds a master's degree in Public Sector Management from Africa University. He was awarded a Doctor of Philosophy degree in public health by Africa University.

== Career ==
Kasu was appointed to the position of Acting Town Clerk by a resolution of the full council of the Municipality of Chitungwiza at its ordinary meeting held on 10 December 2019, and served in this capacity until 21 August 2020. He was the substantive Director of Health and Environmental Services of the Municipality in Chitungwiza, and he served in this capacity starting from April 2016. He was also a member of the Environmental Management and Civil Protection Committees for the Harare Metropolitan Province. He is the former head of the accident and emergency department for St. Anne's Hospital. As a leader in the health sector, he has managed facilities that have won awards for high quality of clinical care. In the country's third largest urban center, he led the response to two cholera outbreaks. He led Chitungwiza's response to the COVID-19 pandemic. As a senior public official having a background as a professional and as an administrator, and not as a politician, he often encountered and experienced problems and setbacks in managing and meeting the expectations of the Chitungwiza community's multiple stakeholders, given the politically polarized environment in Chitungwiza. Although having been criticized as a harsh enforcer of government policies, particularly with respect to illegal and informal trading in Chitungwiza, he has been at the forefront of spearheading urban renewal and development in Chitungwiza. He has been active in sports development and in philanthropic work in the Chitungiwza community.
