= Eagles F.C. (Zimbabwe) =

Zimbabwean football club

Eagles
- Full name: Eagles Football Club
- Founded: 2006; 19 years ago, as Chitungwiza United
- Dissolved: 2011
- Ground: Chitungwiza, Zimbabwe
- Chairman: Stanley Kudenga
- League: Zimbabwe Premier Soccer League (ZPSL)
Home colours

Eagles F.C. is a former Chitungwiza-based football club.

== History ==
The club was founded in February 2006 as Chitungwiza United, prior renamed on 31 August 2007 to Eagles F.C.. The club played since founding in the Division One in Zimbabwe. 2011 the club merged with Zimbabwe Saints F.C.
