= Darren Weber =

Zimbabwean cricketer (born 1972)

Personal information
- Full name: Darren Douglas Weber
- Born: 5 February 1972 (age 54); Bulawayo, Rhodesia
- Batting: Right-handed
- Bowling: Right-arm off break

Domestic team information
- Years: Team
- 1994/95: Matabeleland

Career statistics
Competition	First-class
Matches	2
Runs scored	13
Batting average	3.25
100s/50s	0/0
Top score	5
Balls bowled	12
Wickets	0
Bowling average	–
5 wickets in innings	–
10 wickets in match	–
Best bowling	–
Catches/stumpings	0/–
- Source: Cricinfo, 20 October 2012

Darren Douglas Weber (born 5 February 1972) is a Zimbabwean former cricketer. He was a right-handed batsman and a right-arm off-break bowler who played for Matabeleland. He was born in Bulawayo.

Weber made two first-class appearances for the team, during the Logan Cup competition of 1994–95. Batting in the tailend, he was mostly ineffective, making a top score of just 5 in four innings.
