= Robson Muchichwa =

Zimbabwean footballer (born 1975)

Personal information
- Full name: Robson Muchichwa
- Date of birth: 2 November 1975 (age 50)
- Place of birth: Bulawayo, Rhodesia
- Position: Midfielder

Youth career
- 1989-1992: Eagles FC (Bulawayo, Zimbabwe)

Senior career*
Years	Team	Apps	(Gls)
1995	Qwa Qwa Stars		
1995–1999	Kaizer Chiefs		
2000	Dynamos F.C.	27	(2)
2000–2001	Kaizer Chiefs	16	(0)
2001–2002	Ria Stars	33	(3)
2002–2003	Black Aces FC	13	(0)
2003	Pietersburg Pillars	10	(0)
2003–2004	Benoni Premier United	10	(0)

International career
2000	Zimbabwe	1	(0)
- * Club domestic league appearances and goals

Robson Muchichwa (born 2 November 1975) is a Zimbabwean former footballer who played at both professional and international levels as a midfielder and or centre forward. Muchichwa started playing football in his Bulawayo, Zimbabwe Township of Phelandaba (also known as "No. 6") while attending Induba Primary School. He moved on to join Eagles FC juniors, the most prominent junior program in the Western Suburbs after the Highlanders F.C. and Zimbabwe Saints F.C. programs, based at White City Stadium. In his junior playing days he went by the moniker "Zimara", which most of his childhood friends still use today. Muchichwa last played club football for Benoni Premier United; he also earned one cap for the Zimbabwean national side in 2000.
