= Selmor Mtukudzi =

Zimbabwean musician, and actress (born 1983)

- Born: August 22, 1983 (age 42); Harare, Zimbabwe
- Genres: Afro pop; world
- Occupations: Singer, songwriter
- Years active: 2002–present

Selmor Mtukudzi is a Zimbabwean musician and actress. She is the daughter of the late Zimbabwean music icon and national hero, Oliver Mtukudzi.

== Early life ==
Selmor Mtukudzi is the second child to Oliver Mtukudzi and Melody Murape and was born in Harare. Her parents divorced when she was only 3 years old.

== Career ==
Selmor's career began at the age of 10 when appeared in local ZBC TV dramas and performed the soundtrack of and acted in the movie “I am the future” which featured at local cinemas.

In 2008, Selmor released her debut album titled "Shungu". The album did very well to introduce her arrival on the music scene as a solo artist since she had worked with different artist before. She went on to release 2 joint albums with her musician husband Tendai Manatsa,(son to legendary Zimbabwean musician, Zexie Manatsa), titled Selmor and Tendai "Live" in 2011, which was recorded in front of a live audience at the Prestigious 7 Arts Theatre in Zimbabwe's capital, Harare and "Ndinewe" (I Am With You), in 2012. Her 4th album "Expressions", released in 2013 became an instant hit with the track "Nguva Yangu" being nominated for the NAMA Awards and the ZIMA Awards and winning African Entertainment Awards USA and Zimbabwe Chamber of Commerce — WECA Award.

In 2015 she released her fifth album titled "I Am Woman" with the track "Zvidikidiki" winning the NAMA Awards, Africa Entertainment Awards — USA Award again, and also nominations in the ZIMA Best Video of the Year Category and ZIWA UK Best Female Artist of the Year. Her track "Butterflies" is the sound track for the ZIFF and NAMA Awards nominated movie "Escape", in which she played one of the leading roles. The title track "I Am Woman", encourages women to be confident in themselves and embrace their God given beauty and gifts. This track speaks volumes about Selmor's passion for uplifting girls and women. Her next album “Dehwe Renzou” came in 2020 after the passing of her father. The album was produced by her father's long time friend and producer, South African Saxophonist, Steve Dyer.

Selmor has toured countries that include Nigeria, Botswana, Namibia, Zambia, Tanzania, Australia, USA, UK, Finland, Spain performing in front of different nationals. Selmor has performed at the Joburg Theatre at the Remembering Tuku Concert on the 29th & 30 May 2021 in South Africa with Vusi Mahlasela and Steve Dyer.

In 2015, Selmor came together with 8 other leading female artists from Africa (Judith Sephuma — South Africa, Victoria Kimani — Kenya, Vanessa Mdee — Tanzania, ArielleT — Gabon, Omotola — Nigeria, Waje — Nigeria, Yemi Alade — Nigeria and Blessing South Africa), and collaborated on a song titled "Strong Girl", which they used to promote the campaign #PovertyIsSexist across the world asking the world leaders to tackle poverty by addressing gender equality.

Later that year, they were joined by their male counterparts, (Bono — lead singer for U2 and co Founder of ONE, D'Banj — Nigeria, Diamond Platnumz — Tanzania, Banky W — Nigeria), and did a remix of "Strong Girl" and also made a statement that man are in support of the campaign.

She was also instrumental in the passing of the "Electrify Africa" bill in senate and in the House in Washington DC, America in 2016. This bill states that it is US policy to partner with Sub Saharan African countries, international financial institutions and African regional economic committees, cooperatives and private sectors to promote access to power services to at least 50 million people in Sub Saharan Africa by 2020.

In 2018 Selmor traveled to Canada to speak to the Canadian members of parliament about the importance of girls education.

Selmor has expressed a passion for uplifting and amplifying girls and women's voices. This stated interest has led her to form her own trust called Vabvana Trust. She has stated that she believes that when you empower a woman you empower a nation.

Selmor is an Ambassador for Zimbabwe Big 5 Animals Conservation namely the Lion, Elephant, Buffalo, Rhino and Cheetah and Ambassador for Wild Aid Africa.

== Philanthropy ==
Selmor traveled to Canada to speak to the Canadian members of parliament about the importance of girls education. Selmor's passion for uplifting and amplifying girls and women's voices has led her to form her own trust called Vabvana Trust. She believes that when you empower a woman you empower a nation.

== Personal life ==
Selmor Mtukudzi is married to fellow musician Tendai Manatsa, son to legendary musician Zexie Manatsa and together they have 3 children.

== Discography ==
=== Albums ===
- Shungu 2008
- Live 2011
- Ndinewe (I'm With You) 2012
- Expressions 2013
- I Am Woman 2015
- Dehwe Renzou

=== Singles ===
- Hangasa 2017
- Vakanaka Vakarara 2018
