= Baba Harare =

Zimbabwean musician

- Born: Braveman Chizvino; December 22, 1988 (age 37); Bikita, Zimbabwe
- Origin: Zimbabwe
- Genres: Jiti, Afro-fusion
- Occupations: Musician, singer-songwriter
- Years active: 2010s–present

Baba Harare (born Braveman Chizvino on 22 December 1988) is a Zimbabwean musician. He was a guitarist and backing vocalist in Jah Prayzah's Third Generation band before pursuing a solo career in jiti music.

== Early life ==
Braveman Chizvino was born in Bikita, Zimbabwe. He attended Mashoko Mission, where he completed his primary and secondary education. He learned to play guitar at a young age and took part in local music activities before becoming a professional musician.

== Career ==
=== Jah Prayzah and Third Generation ===
Baba Harare began his professional career as a guitarist and backing vocalist. He became known for his work with Jah Prayzah's Third Generation band, performing at shows and on tours across Zimbabwe.

=== Solo career ===
After leaving Jah Prayzah's band, Baba Harare formed his own band and began recording as a solo artist. He released his debut album, Chikwama Changu, in 2017, focusing on jiti music.

He continued recording and performing at live shows in Zimbabwe.

=== Musical direction ===
In 2024, Baba Harare announced that he was moving into gospel music, citing his Christian faith. The change was reported by The Zimbabwe Independent.

In 2025, he returned to jiti music. In interviews, he explained that he could continue performing jiti while practising his Christian faith.

=== Collaborations ===
Baba Harare has worked with other Zimbabwean musicians, including Mai Tt and Gemma Griffiths.

== Discography ==
=== Albums ===
- Chikwama Changu (2017)

=== Extended plays ===
- Greater and Wiser (2025)

== Personal life ==
Baba Harare has spoken about his Christian faith in interviews, particularly in relation to his decision to record gospel music and his subsequent return to jiti.
