= Ndabenkulu Ncube =

Zimbabwean footballer (born 1988)

Personal information
- Full name: Ndabenkulu Ncube
- Date of birth: 2 August 1988 (age 38)
- Place of birth: Harare, Zimbabwe
- Height: 1.88 m (6 ft 2 in)
- Position: Midfielder

Team information
- Current team: Darryn Textiles Africa United

Senior career*
Years	Team	Apps	(Gls)
2008–	Darryn Textiles Africa United		
2008–2009	→ KS Wisła (loan)		
2009–2010	→ Podbeskidzie (loan)	12	(2)
2010	→ Jagiellonia Białystok (loan)	1	(0)
- * Club domestic league appearances and goals as of 22 May 2014

Ndabenkulu Ncube (born 2 August 1988) is a Zimbabwean professional footballer who plays as a midfielder for Darryn Textiles Africa United.

== Career ==
In the summer 2010, he was loaned to Jagiellonia Białystok on a one-year deal from Darryn Textiles Africa United. He made his debut for Jagiellonia as a substitute for Kamil Grosicki on 10 September 2010 in a 2–1 victory over Wisła Kraków.
