= Chido Govera =

Farmer, campaigner, and educator based in Zimbabwe

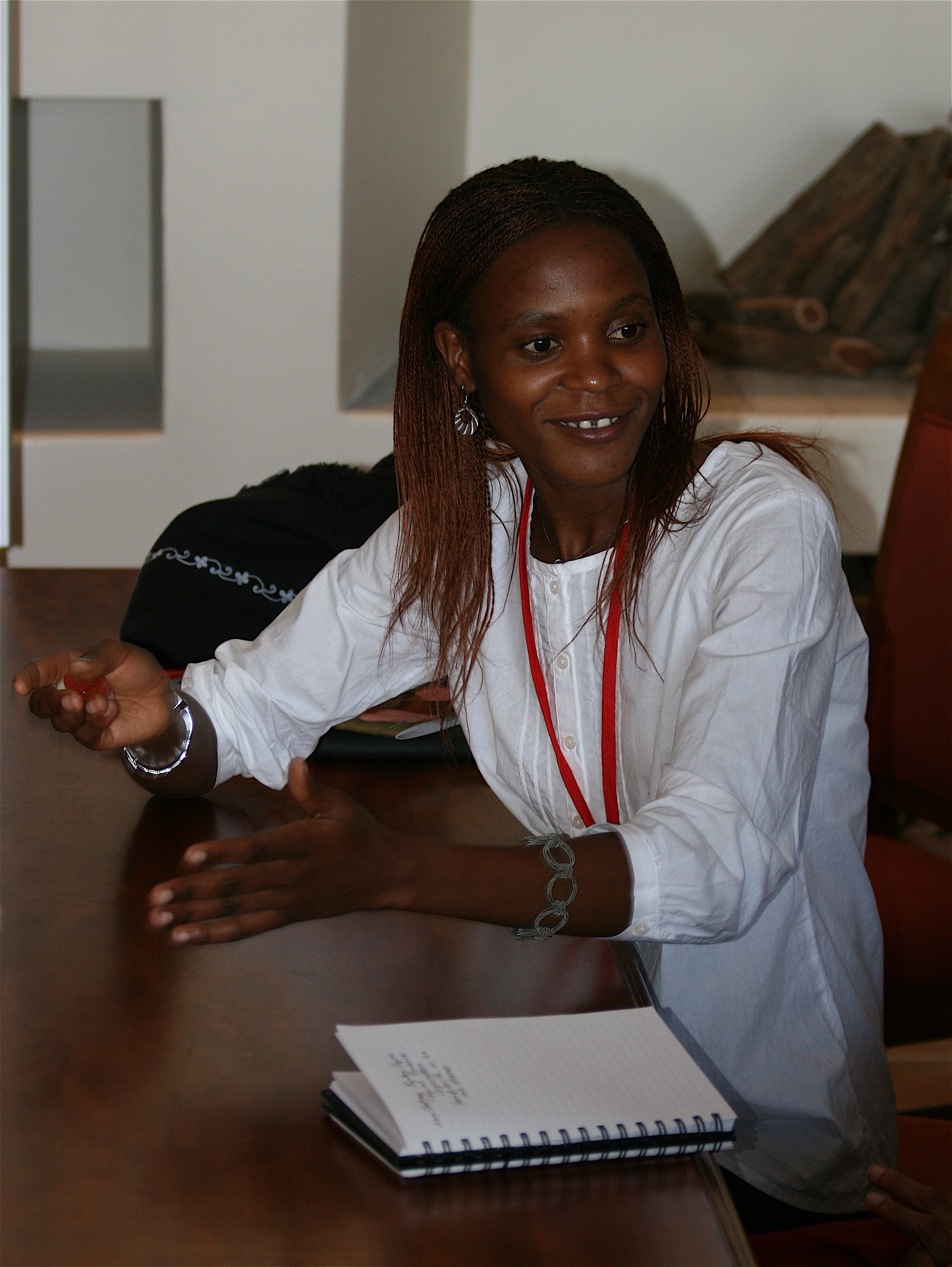
- Born: 1986 (age 39–40); Zimbabwe, Africa
- Citizenship: Zimbabwe
- Occupations: Farmer, educator, human rights campaigner

Chido Govera is a farmer, campaigner, and educator based in Zimbabwe. The founder of The Future of Hope Foundation, she has promoted mushroom cultivation as a sustainable source of food and income in impoverished regions of the world.

== Early life and education ==
Born in 1986 in Zimbabwe, Chido Govera was orphaned at age seven when her mother died from AIDS. She then lived with her grandmother and her brother, but she endured abuse at the hands of family members forcing her to leave school at age nine to work full-time, "digging in people’s fields all to get a small bowl of maize meal". When she was ten, one of her mother's sisters suggested marriage to a man thirty years her senior, but Govera refused, afraid to leave her grandmother and her younger brother.

In 1998 at age eleven, with the help of a woman from the local United Methodist Church, she enrolled in a week-long program at Africa University in Mutare, Zimbabwe, financed by Gunter Pauli and the ZERI Foundation, There she learn how to colonise oyster mushrooms (Pleurotus ostreatus) using corn stalk waste products.

== Career ==
After working in the university's lab between the ages of 12 and 16 years, she was not only able to feed her own family, she was able to teach other orphans to raise mushrooms successfully. Govera taught mushroom culture from cornstalk waste to people from her native Zimbabwe, and her educational efforts have also included use of coffee waste, and have reached people in Australia, Tanzania, the Congo, South Africa, India, Colombia, Serbia and China. She has been credited with "pioneering new techniques, for example growing mushrooms from coffee grounds for commercial use".

Govera has published a memoir, The Future of Hope and established a foundation by the same name.

== Awards ==
In 2009, Govera received the "Sustainability Award" by the Specialty Coffee Association of America, "for her sustainable project of reusing organic waste from the coffee industry to cultivate mushrooms". She also won the Yo Dona magazine "Humanitarian award" in June, 2011, as a "Zimbabwean orphan who is dedicated to helping orphans overcome adversity and live fruitful lives".
