= Janet Manyowa =

Zimbabwean gospel musician

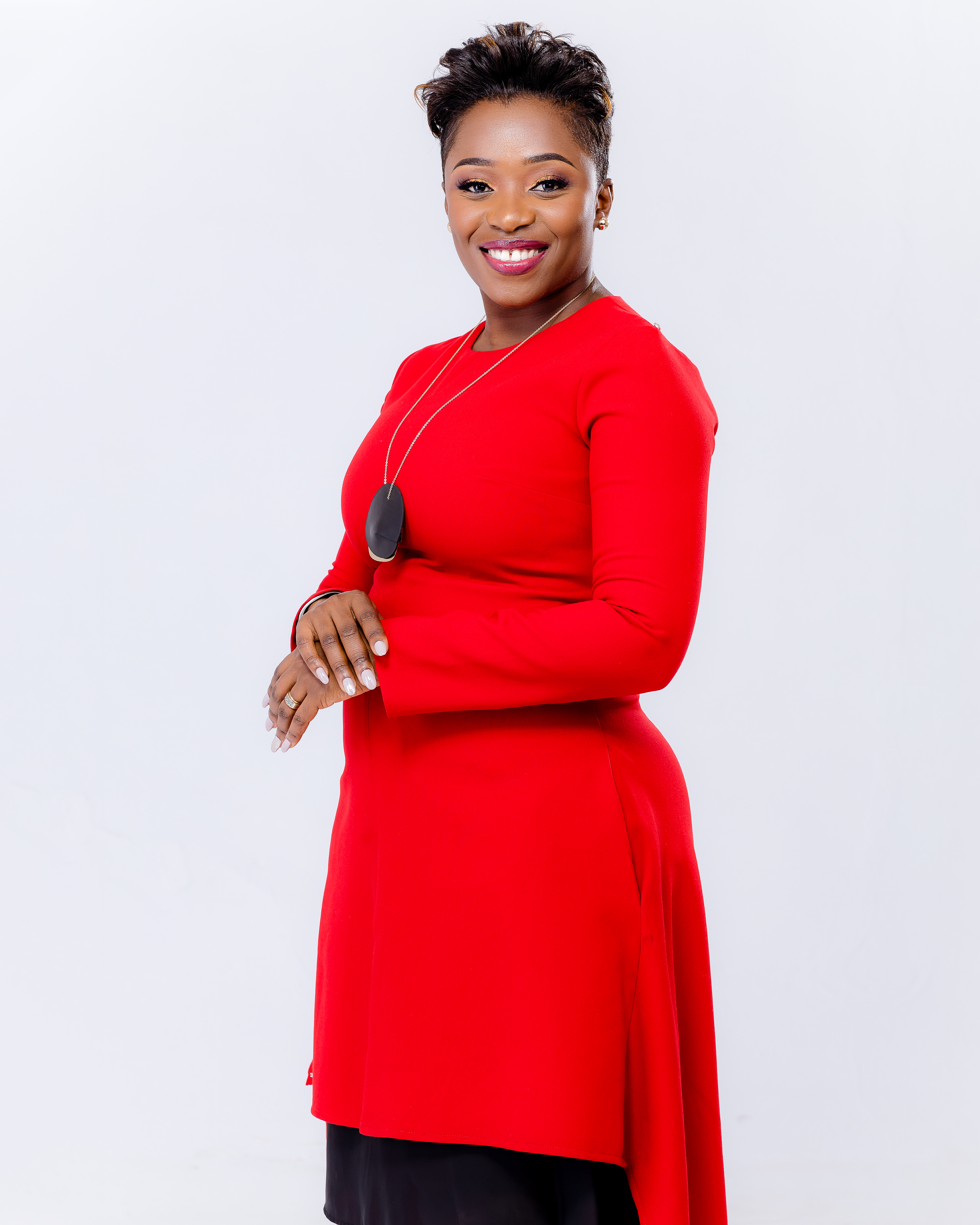

Background information
- Born: March 18, 1985 (age 41); Chegutu, Zimbabwe
- Origin: Zimbabwean
- Genres: Gospel Music
- Occupations: Singer, songwriter
- Years active: 2014–present
- Label: Janet Manyowa Music
- Website: Official website

Janet Manyowa is a Zimbabwean gospel musician.

== Early background ==
Janet Manyowa was born in Harare and resided in Chegutu. Her parents identified her passion for music and they sent her to music school at the age of ten. Her career started when she was leading praise and worship in her hometown church.

== Career ==
Janet Manyowa released her debut album, King of Glory, in August 2015, following the success of the singles "Amazing God" and "Ndomira Pamuri", followed by her second album Grateful, which was launched in 2017 at the Celebration Centre Auditorium. The launch event featured prominent South African gospel musicians Dr Tumi, Ntokozo Mbambo and Nqubeko Mbatha, whom she featured on the song "You Are More".

At the start of 2017, Manyowa launched a new TV talk show called Redeemed. The talk show is based on gospel music and interviews various artists and industry leaders and Christians who have a story of redemption to talk about.

She has been listed among the 100 most influential young Zimbabweans under 40 in 2018 and 2021 she was listed as one of the top 50 most inspirational Women in Zimbabwe according to the Institute of Corporate Directors in Zimbabwe.

In 2020, Manyowa was appointed brand ambassador for ZB Bank Limited and Rainbow Tourism Group, she currently seats as the Board Treasurer of the Zimbabwe Music Rights Association.

== Discography ==
=== Albums ===
- King of Glory (2015)
- Grateful (2017)
- Sounds of victory (2020)

=== Singles ===
- "Muchengeti" featuring Shingisai Suluma
- "King of Glory"
- "Overcome"
- "Tarisa"
- "Ndomira Pamuri"
- "I Trust You" (The Reprise)
- "Ufanelwe"
- "Amazing God" feat. Dr. Comfort Manyame
- "Kune Muponesi" featuring Michael Mahendere
- "Muripo"
- "Amazing God" (Saxophone Version)
- "Zadzisa"
- "Nyasha neNgoni"
- "Ndimi"
- "Ngatimukudzei Mwari"
- "Tariro"
- "Mbiri" featuring Tembalami

=== Charts performance ===
- Song of the Year (Kune Muponesi feat. Michael Mahendere) - Star FM Gospel Greats 2016
- Song of the Year (Zadzisa) - Star FM Zimbabwe Gospel Greats 2017
- Song of the Year (Zadzisa) - Diamond FM top 100 2017
- Song of the Year (Zadzisa) - Power FM Zimbabwe top 100 2017
- Song of the Year (Zadzisa) - ZiFM Stereo 2017
- Ngatimukudzei Mwari - Rainbow FM South Africa Gospel Top 20 (number 1)
- Ndimi - Trace Africa Gospel Hit 30 in 2020
- Song of The Year (Nyasha neNengoni) - Power FM Zimbabwe charts in 2019

== Awards and recognition ==
In the three years that Janet has been in music, she has received more than 42 nominations and 23 awards, among which are:

- Best Newcomer 2015—Zimbabwe Music Awards (ZIMA)
- Best Album 2016— PERMICAN Gospel Awards
- Best Female Artist 2016—Zimbabwe Music Awards (ZIMA)
- Best of Africa 2017 (nominee)— SABC Crown Gospel Awards
- Outstanding Female Musician 2017— NAMA (National Arts Merit Awards)
- Notable Musician 2018 - Zimbabwe Women Awards (ZIWA)
- Gospel Song of the year 2018(Zadzisa) — Star FM Music Awards
- Female Artist of the year 2018 — Star FM Music Awards
- Outstanding Female Musician 2019 - National Arts Merit Awards
- Best Female Act 2019 - Star FM Music Awards 2019
- Best Female Musician, Album of the Year, Video of the Year (Nyash neNgoni), Best Songwriter 2019 - Permican Gospel Awards
- Best Contemporary Gospel Musician 2020 - Zimbabwe Music Awards
- Best Female Artist, Gospel Song of the Year (Ndimi) 2020 - Star FM Music Awards
- Best Collaboration (feat. Tembalami) 2020 - Maranatha Africa Continental Awards
- Best Female Musician 2021 - Zimbabwe Music Awards
- Best Album of the Year 2021 (Sounds of Victory) - Zimbabwe Music Awards

== Personal life ==
Janet is married to Munyaradzi Manyowa and together they have three children, Matipa, Waishe and Mufaro. She is an accountant by profession.
