= Levels Chillspot =

Zimbabwean music producer and artist

- Born: Rodger Tafadzwa Kadzimwe; 9 September 1989 (age 37)
- Genres: Zimdancehall; Reggae
- Occupations: Songwriter; record producer
- Instruments: Keyboard & FL Studio
- Years active: 2011–present
- Label: Chillspot Recordz

Rodger Tafadzwa Kadzimwe (born 9 September 1989) known professionally as Levels Chillspot, is a Zimbabwean music producer, artist and Zimdancehall chanter. He is co-founder of Chillspot Recordz.

== Background ==
Kadzimwe grew into prominence when he co-founded one of the most successful Zimdancehall record labels in Zimbabwe, Chillspot Recordz in 2013 which popularised Zimdancehall genre.

Kadzimwe has produced about 30 riddims and some of them have won several awards. He has produced for several top artists including Turbulence, Winky D, Freeman HKD, I-Octane, Romain Virgo, Charlie Black, Enzo Ishall, Killer T, Tocky Vibes, DJ Tira and several other local artists.

== Awards ==
- Zimdancehall Awards - Best Producer 2013, 15, 19, 2020 (Nominated 2014, 16, 17 and 2018)
- Zimdancehall Awards - Best Collaborative Production 2015
- Zimbabwe Music Awards - Best Producer 2021
- Star FM Music Awards - Best Producer 2021 (Nominated)
