= Freeman HKD =

- Also known as: Freeman HKD, HKD Boss, Doctor we magitare, Sly
- Born: Emegy Slyvester Chizanga; June 22, 1988 (age 38); Bindura, Zimbabwe
- Origin: Zimbabwean
- Genre: Dancehall
- Occupations: Singer, songwriter
- Years active: 2009–present
- Label: HKD Records

Freeman HKD Boss (born June 22, 1988), born Emegy Slyvester Chizanga, is a Zimdancehall artist who rose to prominence after release of Joina City single.

== Early life ==
Freeman HKD was born in Bindura, Mashonaland Central province of Zimbabwe in a family of 6. He grew up in Bindura town where he attended his early education.

== Career background ==
Freeman started his music career in 2009 when he recorded his first track Unondipa Rudo which was produced by WeMaNuff Nhubu. Before becoming a recording artist, he was a professional footballer playing for Mwana Africa F.C. in first division league at the time, he also spent a considerable time of his life in the late 2000s as a butcher boy in the Waterfalls area. As an underground artist, Freeman HKD continued to record more tracks including Unondipa Rudo, Ellen, Mapatya, Mhuka Nhatu, Murondatsimba, Handichakuda and Ndoda.

In 2010, Freeman HKD met Dj Staera who introduced him to Hillary Mutake of Punchline Entertainment and there after, he started doing public performances, his first performance was at a high school in Banket in late 2010. His big break came with the release of his track Joina City, the song became a hit on radio stations in Zimbabwe. Freeman was listed as one of the 100 most influential young Zimbabweans of 2013.

In 2012, Freeman HKD established HKD Records a record label which houses numerous popular and some award-winning artists including Daruler, Delroy, Vivian, Black Warrior, Crystal and Maggikal, so he is also referred to as HKD Boss.

In April 2023, Freeman HKD established a soccer team, Gallis FC.

In September 2023, Freeman HKD went on to establish another soccer team, Gallis Legends. Freeman HKD captains the team.

Both teams currently do not play in any competitive league but they occasionally host and play in various tournaments.

== Discography ==
Freeman HKD has recorded 12 studio albums:

=== Albums ===
- Tapinda Mustaera 2011
- Last Man Standing 2012
- Vabeliver 2013
- New Chapta 2014
- Varidzi Vezvinhu 2015
- Mangoma Ihobho 2016
- Top Striker 2017
- Mukuru WeKambani 2018
- Gango 2019
- Kusuka EP
- Robbery 2021
- David and Goliath 2022
- Trophy 2023
- MevsMe 2024

=== Mixtapes ===
- Freeman & Friends 2020

=== Singles ===
- Joina City feat. Cally C 2014
- Shaina 2013
- Bata Ruwoko Rwangu 2014
- Interview feat. Darula 2016
- Ndarangarira 2016
- Time To Get Rich feat. Anthony B 2017
- Bhebhi Rakashata 2017
- Wekwedu 2018
- Imi Amai Kusuka 2018
- Mbuya Nehanda feat. Nutty O 2018
- Doctor weMagitare
- Ngaibake 2019
- Nzenza feat. Ex Q 2019
- Jerusarema feat. EX-Q
- Miridzo 2020
- Mudzanga 2020
- Ndinofirapo feat. Yadah Voices
- Zi zi feat. Mai Titi 2020
- iParty feat. Sandra Ndebele 2021
- Pombi 2021
- What's your name 2021

=== Radio hits ===
Freeman HKD has had several hits across Zimbabwean radio stations from his breakout song Joina City in 2013. In October 2013 to December 2013, Shaina single was voted in radio charts then in 2014, his song Bata Ruwoko Rwangu was in radio top charts for eight weeks from March to early May 2014. Freeman HKD continued to have radio success with other singles over the years, in 2019 his single Ngaibake won song of the year and Nzenza was named the most played song on radio.

Other most performing tracks on radio include:

- Joina City
- Shaina
- Bata Ruwoko Wangu
- Jerusarema feat. EX-Q
- Ndinofirapo feat. Yadah Voices
- Kutenda feat. Mambo Dhuterere
- Ngaibake
- Nzenza

== Awards ==
- Zimbambwe Music Awards 2022, Male Artist of the year (Nomination)
- Zimdancehall Awards 2013, Male Artist of the year (Nomination)
- Zimdancehall Awards 2014, Album the year (New Chapta)
- Zimdancehall Awards 2015, Zimdancehall Ambassador
- Zimdancehall Awards 2016, Zimdancehall Ambassador
- Zimbabwe Achievers Awards 2016, International Music Artist of the year
- Zimdancehall Awards 2017, Best Album (Top Striker), Best Stable (HKD Records)
- Zimdancehall Awards 2019, Album the year (Gango), Song of the year (Ngaibake)
- Zimbabwe Music Awards 2019–20, Best Music Video (Ngaibake), Best Collaboration nomination Ngaibake (feat. Alick Macheso), Best Zimdancehall Artist, Best Male Artist of the Year (Nomination), Best Album (Gango)
- National Arts Merit Awards 2019, Artist of the year, Album of the year Gango, Best Music video of the year for Ngaibake (nomination)
- Star FM Music Awards 2019, People's Choice, Song of the year Ngaibake
- Star FM Music Awards 2019, Most Played Song on radio Nenza
- Zimdancehall Awards 2020, Best Male Artist
- Zimbabwe Music Awards 2020, Best Album of the year nomination and Best Male Artist of the year nomination
- Star FM Music Awards 2020, Best Album of the year (Freeman and Friends), Best Male Artist of the year nomination

== Personal life ==
Freeman HKD is married to Barbra Chinhema since 2012.
