= Feli =

Feli is a name, which can be a hypocorism of Felicia or Feliciano. Notable people with this name or nickname include:

- Féli Delacauw (born 2002), Belgian footballer
- Feli Donose (born 1986), Romanian singer performing as 'Feli'
- Feli Ferraro, American singer, producer and songwriter
- Feli from Germany, German-American YouTuber
- Feli Nandi, Zimbabwean singer
- Feli Nuna, Ghanaian singer
- Jabbar Feli (born 1950), Iranian boxer
- Feli, a character from the Puyo Puyo series
