= Dj Fantan =

- Born: Arnold Kamudyariwa; 17 March 1987 (age 38); Mbare, Zimbabwe
- Origin: Zimbabwe
- Genres: Zimdancehall; Reggae
- Occupations: record producer; dj; dancehall chanter
- Years active: 2011–present
- Labels: Chillspot Recordz

Dj Fantan (born Arnold Kamudyariwa) is a Zimbabwean record producer, record executive, DJ and Zimdancehall chanter.

== Early life and education ==
Dj Fantan was born in Mbare, Harare, where he grew up. He attended Gwinyai Primary School and George Stark High School, where he did his secondary education, and met his business partner, Levels Chillspot.

In 2011, Fantan turned his bedroom into a recording studio, establishing Chillspot Recordz with Levels. The duo went on to discover talents from around Zimbabwe by producing riddims, which popularised the Zimdancehall genre, hence its growth. In 2013, his production with Levels (Zimbo Flavor Riddim) went on to win Riddim of the year. In 2014, they won Conscious Riddim of the year (Pure Niceness) and Best Collaboration Riddim (Mad Levels), then Riddim of the year 2015 (Stage Riddim) at the Zimdancehall Awards.

On 3 January 2021, DJ Fantan and colleagues were arrested for violating COVID-19 regulations after hosting a New Year's Eve bash that attracted thousands of people. Their initial sentence of 12 months' jail term was reduced to three months with an option to pay a $2,000 fine each, which they did on conditions of good behaviour from then to 2025.

== Mix tape sole productions ==
- Madlevel Riddim 2013
- Zimdancehall Mixtape 2013
- The Dj Fantan Zimdancehall Mixtape 2014
- Zim Lovers Mixtape 2014
- Zimdancehall Mixtape 2014
