= Carole Nyakudya =

- Also known as: Carole Felice
- Born: April 3, 1978 (age 47); Harare, Zimbabwe
- Origin: Zimbabwean
- Genres: Gospel music
- Occupations: Singer, songwriter
- Years active: 2004–present

Carole Nyakudya is a prominent Zimbabwean gospel music artist, entrepreneur, a founding member of the Zimpraise Choir and presenter for a popular online television platform, Zimbolive TV.

== Background ==
Born in Zimbabwe in 1978, Nyakudya grew up in the city of Bulawayo then migrated to the United Kingdom in 1997 where she started a career as a mental health professional for the NHS. Nyakudya has a Diploma in Mental Health Nursing which she attained at Birmingham University, BSc in Health Studies from Wolverhampton University and an MSc in Public Health & Health Development that she studied at Birmingham City University.

Carole Nyakudya became notable in 2005 when she released her debut album This Is Now which was nominated for Outstanding Album Of The Year at the National Arts Merit Awards in 2005. Nyakudya is a founding member of a gospel music group, Zimpraise Choir which was founded in 2006.

In 2013 Carole Nyakuya established Lorac International a UK labor recruitment company and has had some recognition in 2021 for her activities with the company. She contributed as a co-author with other women who shared about real life challenges in a 2017 book titled Beyond the scars (Overcomers Book 1).

== Discography ==
=== Albums ===
- This is Now 2005
- All For You 2008
- Dwelling Place 2017

=== Singles ===
Song	Album	Year
Truth	Single	2008
Only you	Single	2013
Muimbire feat. Sabastian Magacha	Dwelling Place	2016
Anehanya Neni feat. Tembalami	Single	2016
You never change	Single	2019
Keep on	Single	2019
Look to you	Single	2020

== Recognition ==
- Outstanding Music Album (This is Now) National Arts Merit Awards (NAMA) 2005 nomination.
- Female Gospel Artist of the Year Zimbabwe Music and Arts Awards 2016 winner
- Outstanding Female Gospel Artist PERMICAN Awards 2016 nomination
- Media Personality of the year Zimbabwe Achievers Awards 2017 nomination
- Best International Gospel Artiste of the year Zimbabwe Achievers Awards 2018 nomination
- Best Media Presenter All Women Achievers Awards 2020 nomination
- Female Entrepreneur of the Year Zimbabwe Achievers Awards 2021
