= Qounfuzed =

- Also known as: Ndururani, Munyanyi
- Born: McDonald Sheldon; June 5, 1993 (age 32); Harare, Zimbabwe
- Origin: Zimbabwean
- Genres: Afro dancehall, Zimdancehall
- Occupation(s): Singer, songwriter
- Years active: 2008–present

McDonald Sheldon, known professionally as Qounfuzed is a Zimbabwean singer and songwriter. He rose to prominence in 2011 when he released Chimbovarega single which became a radio hit.

== Background ==
Born in 1993 in Harare, Qounfuzed grew up in Harare where he attended his early education in Warren Park suburb.

Qounfuzed started his music career in 2008 as an Urban Grooves artist when he recorded his first songs signed with Track Records at the age of 15. He then switched genres becoming a dancehall artist and went on to release his debut album titled "King of Style" in 2011, same year he collaborated with Freeman HKD on track Chimbovarega which became his breakout hit song and has released several radio hits including Mwana, Chibhubhubhu ft Stunner, Ndakusuwa, Musanyepere Vanhu ft Maskiri & Munetsi, Kana Wazofunga ft Pah Chihera, Kusvika Rinyure, Mhosva, Memories and Mudhudhudhu which performed on Power FM Zimbabwe and Star FM Zimbabwe charts. In 2011 he was cast for a ZBC TV series Go Chanaiwa Go and starred a cameo appearance on one of Simbimbindo 's episodes as a performer in 2012. In 2023, Qounfuzed featured on Winky D' s Eureka album XYZ track.

Qounfuzed was nominated for Best New Artist in 2013 and Best Video in 2014 at the Zimdancehall Awards and was awarded as Zimdancehall Best Artist in Diaspora 2020. In 2022 Qounfuzed was awarded Best Male Artist of 2021 at the Zimbabwe British Entertainment Awards.

== Discography ==
=== Albums ===
- King of Style

=== Singles ===
- Personal Person
- Wakanaka
- Pamwe Uri Kufara
- Goodnight
- Ndakusuwa
- Sasa
- 9ine
- Ngwavha Ngwavha
- Handichambokufunga
- Mhosva feat. Cindy
- Georgina
- Memories
- Shisha
- Sofa
- Hennessy

== Awards ==
- Zimdancehall Awards 2022 - Best Artist in Diaspora
- Zimdancehall Awards 2022 - Song of the yea
