= Rachel J =

Rachel J Rachel Jambaya
- Also known as: Rae Rae
- Born: Kwekwe, Zimbabwe
- Origin: Zimbabwean
- Genres: Afro pop; Afrobeats; world
- Occupations: Singer, songwriter
- Years active: 2016–present

Rachel J (born Rachel Jambaya) is a Zimbabwean musical artist, television personality and businesswoman.

== Background ==
Rachel J was born in Kwekwe in Zimbabwe's midlands province then she grew up in Gweru where she had her early education.

Rachel J began her music career in 2016 when she released her debut album titled Triumph which was entirely gospel and a dedication to her grandmother. After Triumph, Rachel then began releasing an array of singles from 2018 when she released an afro fusion track titled Makwikwi. The solo track went on high rotation on radio stations in Zimbabwe and featured on charts for several weeks which then inspired the making of Makwikwi Reloaded in dancehall genre which featured Zimdancehall artists Soul Jah Love, Sniper Storm and Lady Squanda in December 2018.

In 2019, she released a jazz track called Njiva in collaboration with Dereck Mpofu which was followed by Bada Boom which featured Roki and Ngoro which featured Enzo Ishall, the song sparked some controversy in Zimbabwe. April 2020, Rachel delivered another gospel song Hallelujah which also did well on radio and TV. In 2021 she released an afro fusion track Strong Black Man which featured Novi Keys then Fambai Mberi in 2022.

In 2018 Rachel J was awarded the Most Outstanding Beautiful Woman in Zimbabwe at the Zimbabwe Models Awards. In 2022 she was nominated at the Zimbabwe Fashion Awards in the Most Stylish Female Celebrity.

In 2021, Rachel J published the first ever biography of Zimbabwe president Emmerson Mnangagwa titled A Life Of Sacrifice.
