= Takesure Zamar Ncube =

Takesure Zamar
- Birth name: Takesure Ncube
- Also known as: Zamar
- Born: 25 February 1981 (age 44) Beitbridge, Zimbabwe
- Origin: Zimbabwean
- Genres: Gospel Music
- Occupation(s): Singer, songwriter
- Instrument(s): Keyboard, guitar
- Years active: 2005–present
- Labels: Bold Music
- Website: tkzamar.com

Takesure ‘Zamar’ Ncube is a Zimbabwean award-winning gospel musician, producer, songwriter, instrumentalist and vocalist based in South Africa. Takesure is a recipient of the Best of Africa Award from SABC Crown Gospel Awards.

== Early life ==
Zamar was born in 1981 in Beitbridge, Zimbabwe and attended school in the small border town. While still in primary school his love for music was ignited at the age of 10. As he grew older, he started refining his gift and learning to play various musical instruments.

== Career Background ==
In 2005, he enrolled for a Music and Musicology Diploma at the Zimbabwe College of Music in Bulawayo. Thereafter, he taught music at a private school in Harare.

In 2011, he formed his group Worship Addicts in Harare and in that year the group released its maiden album. His ability to speak and sing in several African languages that include Zulu, Venda, Sotho, Swahili, Ndebele, Shona and Tswana has endeared him with regional of gospel music lovers.

He rose to prominence in 2014 when he joined the multi-award-winning gospel ensemble Joyous Celebration as a vocalist. Two years later, Zamar moved to South Africa after joining the Bold Music stable. In a media interview, Zamar said that he has written over 500 songs so far.

In 2017, he recorded his first live DVD, which was attended by over 20 South African gospel musicians.

== Discography ==
=== Albums ===
- Praise Addicts Vol. 1
- Praise Addicts Vol. 2
- Praise Addicts Vol 3
- Worship Addicts Vol. 1
- Worship Addicts Vol. 2
- Worship Addicts Vol. 3
- Worship Addicts Vol. 4
- Worship Devotional Vol. 5

=== Singles ===
- Kuregerera in Advance
- Agere Pachigaro
- Sorry
- Kuzobalungela
- Ibhaibhili Ke?
- Unotapirirwa
- Taura Neni
- Mtwene
- Ngidinga Wena
- Nhare Yangu
- Bhaibheri
- Rwizi

== Awards ==
- Best International Gospel Artist – Zimbabwe Achievers Awards 2015
- Best Male Artist – Zimbabwe Music Awards (ZIMA) in 2015.
- Best of Africa Award – SABC Crown Gospel Awards 2018

== Personal life ==
Zamar married Kudzai Marova Ncube in December 2015.
