= Zimcelebs =

Zimbabwe social media platform

Zimcelebs is a Zimbabwean celebrity news social media-based blog.

== Background ==
Zimcelebs was founded in February 2017 as Zimcelebs TV by Lewis John. John was running a nightclub in South Africa then and he recruited Tafadzwa Gondo, who was a freelance journalist, to become his partner. The duo subsequently revealed that the Zimcelebs idea was inspired by The Shade Room. In 2020, the duo was joined by Aleck Leccoo, who was a co-founder of Hatirare 263, a journalist by profession and a business entrepreneurship graduate from Chinhoyi University. Over the years, the platform has become one of Zimbabwe's main portals for celebrity breaking news and the social media based blog has accumulated a significant following. In March 2021, Zimcelebs was listed as the 6th most influential social media platform in Zimbabwe with the highest engagement percentage and has about 7 million views on YouTube.

Since 2019, Zimcelebs has launched a number of online programs in which musical artists perform live. Some programs include Ndipe Mic 2019, Bhazi reMangoma 2020, Garage Sessions 2021 and MaChillz. These sessions have hosted top artists like Alick Macheso, Enzo Ishall, Tocky Vibes, Poptain, Stunner, Jah Signal, Winky D, Mudiwa Hood, Kikky Badass, Seh Calaz, Nutty O, Bazooker, Holy Ten, Baba Harare. In 2020, Passion Java Records launched Garamumba which was the first Zimbabwean lockdown online performances session, and parts one through seven were launched and streamed on Zimcelebs's social media. The segments averaged 300,000 to 500,000 views per session.

== Recognition ==
- Zim Glam Awards 2018 – Best Online Media
- Changamire Festival Awards 2019 – Best Online Media
- Zimdancehall Awards 2019 – Best Online Media
- National Arts Merit Awards 2020 – Outstanding Online Media nomination
- Zimbabwe Achievers Awards 2020 – Simba Mhere category for best online platform winner 2020
- Changamire Festival Awards 2021 – Best Brand Supporting Hip Hop
