= Tembalami =

Zimbabwean gospel artist

- Born: Temba Tagwireyi; 16 January 1982 (age 44); Chitungwiza, Zimbabwe
- Origin: Zimbabwean
- Genres: Gospel
- Occupations: Singer; songwriter
- Instrument: Vocals
- Years active: 2002–present

Temba Tagwireyi (born January 16, 1982), known professionally as Tembalami, is a Zimbabwean gospel artist and businessman.

== Background ==
Tagwireyi was born in Chitungwiza where he grew up and attended his early education.

Tagwireyi started his music career in 2002 as part of a gospel group called The Burning Bush, then he had a stint as a secular artist in 2004. During that time, he collaborated with the rap duo Extra Large. He became prominent after the release of the Tomurumbidza Medley single from his first studio album Brighter Day which became a hit on radio charts in Zimbabwe in 2011. Tagwireyi had his first studio recording with The Burning Bush. He then left the group to become one of the founding members of popular group, Zimpraise Choir, in 2006. He had his first international tour in 2014 when he toured the United States' East Coast.

== Personal life ==
Tagwireyi is married to Anesu Mawoneke since November 2018.

== Discography ==
=== Albums ===
- Brighter Day 2011
- Faith-Aid Kit 2013
- Ministry of works (Audio and DVD album) 2015
- The Fight 2018
- Not Going Back 2022
- Church On The Street 2024

=== Singles ===
- Brighter Day feat. Carol Wutawunashe (2011)
- Tomurumbidza Medley feat. Wellington Kwenda (2011)
- Mhanya (2012)
- Handidzokere shure (2012)
- Bayete (2013)
- Ndoyenda (2013)
- Hande feat. Wellington Kwenda & Melz (2014)
- Bayete Remix (2014)
- L.O.V.E feat. Melz (2015)
- Mapapiro feat. Mkhululi Bhebhe (2016)
- One True Religion (2016)
- Sekerera (2017)
- Dairai (2018)
- Mirira (2019)
- Waweza feat. Sofi Mendez (2019)
- Mbiri feat. Janet Manyowa (2020)
- It's Coming Down (2020)
- It's Already Done feat. Bridget Ndanga (2021)
- Good Good (2022)
- Tevera (2022)
- Victory feat. Nutty O (2022)
- Misodzi (2023)
- Gore Rino feat. The Unveiled (2024)
- Moyo Wangu (2024)
- Kunaka feat. Spiwe Ndebele (2024)

== Awards ==
Year	Ceremony	Award	Result
2014	PERMICAN Awards	Ministry with Excellence	Won
2015	PERMICAN Awards	Best Urban Contemporary Album, Best Music Video (L.O.V.E)	Won
2016	PERMICAN Awards	Best live DVD recording	Nominated
2016	Zimbabwe Achievers Awards	International Gospel Artist of the year	Won
2017	African Gospel Music Awards	Artiste of Excellence (Southern Africa)	Nominated
2018	Groove Awards	Southern Artist of the year	Nominated
2018	Star FM Music Awards	Gospel Song of the year (Dairai)	Nominated
2019	PERMICAN Awards	Video of the year, Best Urban Contemporary (Sekerera), Best Male Artist	Nominated
2020	Maranatha Awards	Best Collaboration in Southern Africa (Mbiri with Janet Manyowa)	Won
2021	Zimbabwe Music Awards	Best Gospel Artist	Nominated
