= Feliciana =

Feliciana may refer to:

- Feliciana, Kentucky, an unincorporated community
- Feliciana Parish, Louisiana, a parish from 1810 to 1824, when it was divided into East and West Feliciana Parish

== See also ==
- East Feliciana Parish, Louisiana
- West Feliciana Parish, Louisiana
- Feliciano (disambiguation)
