= Star FM Music Awards 2019 =

Zimbabwean music awards ceremony

- Date: 1 February 2019
- Location: Zimbali Gardens, Harare, Zimbabwe
- Hosted by: Miss V Candy; DJ Mox

Highlights
- Most awards: Ex Q (5)

The 2019 Star FM Music Awards were held on February 1, 2019, at Zimbali Gardens in Harare, Zimbabwe. The awards identify musical excellence, providing a multifaceted celebration of the rich cultural diversity of Zimbabwean music.

The 'Tsvigiri' singer took home five awards in the following categories: Best Afro Pop Song, Best Collaboration, Best Male Artist, Best Album and Most Played Song.

Janet Manyowa and Enzo Ishall won two awards each. The former emerged tops in the Best Gospel Song and Best Female Artist categories while Enzo Ishal triumphed in the Best Newcomer and Best Zimdancehall categories. Other winners with one award each are Winky D, Novuyo Sea Girl, sungura artist Alick Macheso, Jah Signal, Takura, DJ Tamuka and Jah Signal. The awards featured performances from Jah Prayzah among others.

The ceremony was sponsored by Impala Car Rentals. It celebrated Zimbabwean talent across 16 award categories, including Best Male, Best Female, Best Song and Best Collaboration. The nominees were revealed on 22 December 2018 October in Harare.

== Winners and nominees ==
=== Song of the Year ===
Jah Signal - "Sweetie"

- Enzo Ishal – "Kanjiva"
- Ex Q ft Freeman HKD – "Nzenza"
- Nutty O – "Boom Shelele"
- Baba Harare – "The Reason Why"

=== Best Male Act ===
Ex Q

- Enzo Ishal
- Jah Prayzah
- Killer T

=== Best Female Act ===
Janet Manyowa

- Tamy Moyo
- Ammara Brown
- Shashl
- Cindy Munyavi

=== Best Duo/Group ===
N.X.T

- Diamond Boyz

=== Best Diaspora Act ===
Kazz A.K.A Mr Boomslang

- Dizzy Dee
- Mkhululi Bhebhe
- Daddy Don
- Vimbayi Zimuto

=== Best Newcomer ===
Enzo Ishall

- Novuyo Seagirl
- Baba Harare
- Lloyd Soul
- Uncle Epatan

=== Best Collaboration ===
Ex Q (featuring Freeman) – "Nzenza"

- Jah Signal (featuring Nicholas Zakaria) – "Unovashungurudza"
- Ex Q (featuring Jah Prayzah & DJ Tamuka) – "Pahukama"
- Winky D (featuring Vabati va Jehova) – "Ngirozi"
- Tamy (featuring Nutty O) – "Lay it Down"

=== Best Producer ===
DJ Tamuka

- Oskid
- Reverb 7
- Chiweddar

=== Most played ===
Nzenza

=== People's Choice Award ===
Winky D
