= Dizzy Dee =

Zimbabwean reggae singer and songwriter

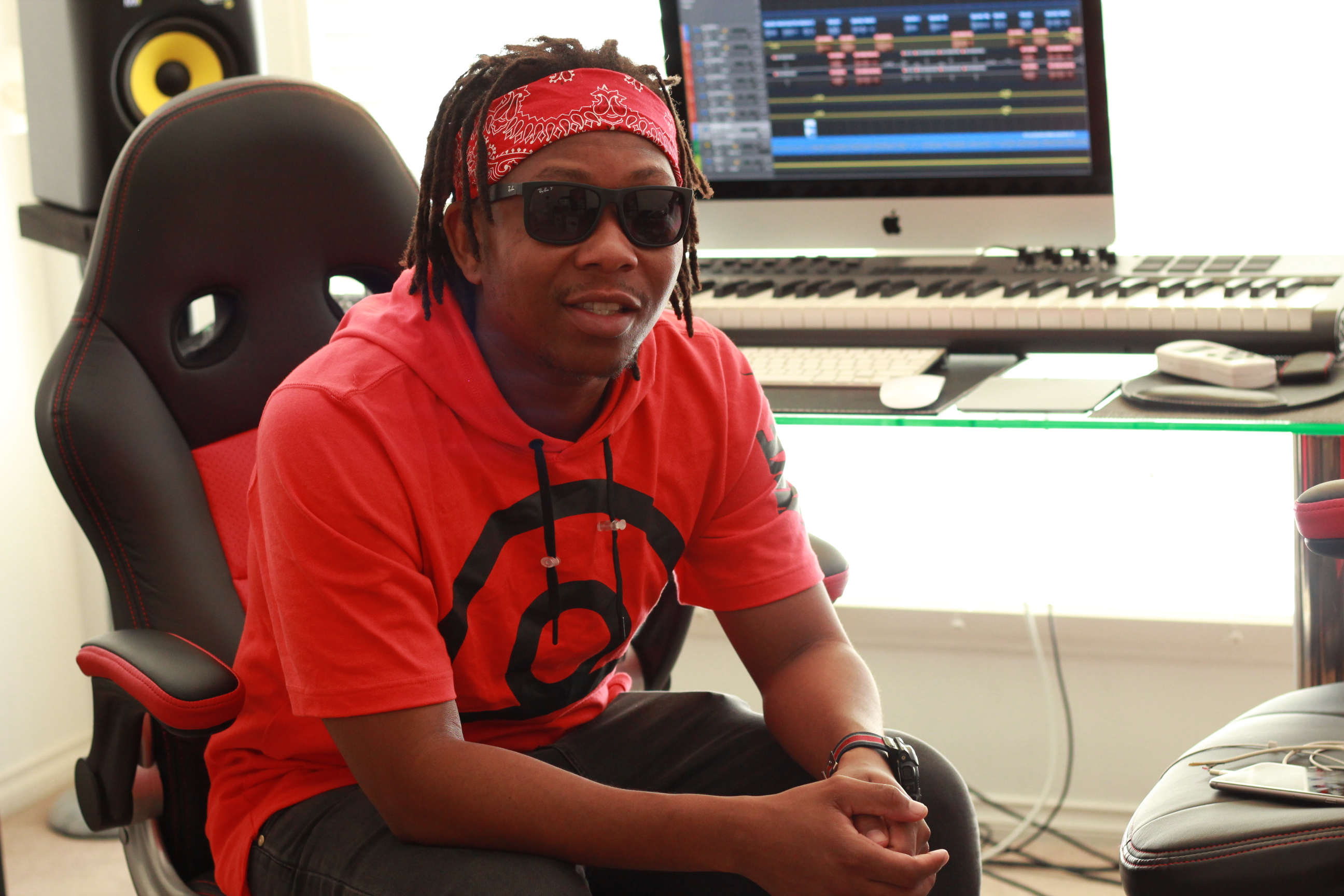
- Dizzy Dee in studio
- Born: Desire Sibanda; 17 December 1985 (age 40); Triangle, Zimbabwe
- Other name: Dizzy
- Education: South Eastern College
- Occupations: Singer; songwriter; DJ; record producer; record executive
- Years active: 2004–present
- Parents: Danny Sibanda (father); Lillian Sibanda (mother)
- Musical career
- Genre: Reggae
- Instruments: Vocals; guitar
- Labels: VP Records; VPAL Music; Soundalize It Records; Dizzy Dee Music
- Website: dizzydeemusic.com

Desire Sibanda (born 17 December 1985) is a Zimbabwean reggae singer and songwriter, better known by his stage name Dizzy Dee. He moved to Australia in 2007 and currently resides in Melbourne where he performs and works as a disk jockey on a regular basis.

Born in Collin Saunders Hospital in Triangle, Zimbabwe, Dizzy Dee moved to Australia at age twenty one, where he studied graphic design. After a brief stint as a DJ, he released his first EP U Don't Care in 2008. As a producer he has worked with artists such as Quashani Bahd on her single "That's Why I Love You" and executively produced dancehall artist Slicker 1's debut album, Culture Shocked. For Valentine's Day 2017 he released the single "All That I Need" featuring PASIKA.

== Musical career ==
=== 2007–2014: ABRA Records, U Don't Care, Soundalize It, "Never See We Fading" and "Overcome" ===
Since arriving in Australia he has collaborated with a number of international artists, and has opened for Sean Paul and Richie Spice.

In 2008 he joined ABRA Records, led by fellow Zimbabwean producer Tawanda Sibotshiwe. ABRA has produced songs for Jamaican artists including Red Rat, Ward 21, Beenie Man, Charly Black and Major Lazer.

Sibanda recorded his first EP U Don't Care in 2008, releasing it in 2009 under ABRA Records. The EP features five tracks: "U Don't Care", "Fuss & Fight", "Achadzoka", and an instrumental mix and an a cappella version of the title track "U Don't Care". The EP was targeted at the zimdancehall community in Zimbabwe, and was made available on CD and by digital download.

In 2014 Sibanda began experimenting with a different sound, roots reggae. After working with Chilean-based producer Kutral Dub on the single "Give Me Love", he became interested in Soundalize It Records, a Romanian label with whom he later signed. He also joined forces with Romanian reggae producer LionRiddims to record the roots reggae tracks "Never See We Fading", "Time Shall Tell" and "Overcome".

Although he started his recording career in 2004, Sibanda's became more widely known in 2014 when he collaborated with Jamaican reggae star Torch, co-writing the song "Thought for the Mind". Torch also featured on Sibanda's 2014 single "Never See We Fading". He also recorded "Overcome" featuring Beniton.

=== 2015–2016: Time Shall Tell and VP Records ===
After signing a distribution deal with VPAL Music (of VP Records) in 2016, he released an EP, Time Shall Tell, later that year. Dizzy Dee joins StoneBwoy and Patoranking as one of the few African born reggae artists signed to the label.

The six-track set gathered musicians and producers from Jamaica, Romania, Canada, United States, (Germany), Australia and Vanuatu to create a contemporary reggae/dancehall-infused sound. The EP also features "Overcome" featuring Beniton, "Stay Focused" with German musician Saralène and "Wake Up & Live" featuring Australian Reggae artist Jah Tung and Tujah from Vanuatu.

The EP debuted at number 2 on the Australian iTunes charts for the roots reggae genre, and received airtime on local and international radio stations.

=== 2017–present: My Journey ===
In February 2017, Sibanda performed at the 36th Annual Bob Marley Outernational concert as a headline artist alongside Etana and Black Slate. In March he toured with Beenie Man as one of the official supporting artists on his maiden tour of Australia.

He is set to release a new album, My Journey, in 2017, featuring collaborations with artists from Jamaica and Zimbabwe.

== Artistry ==
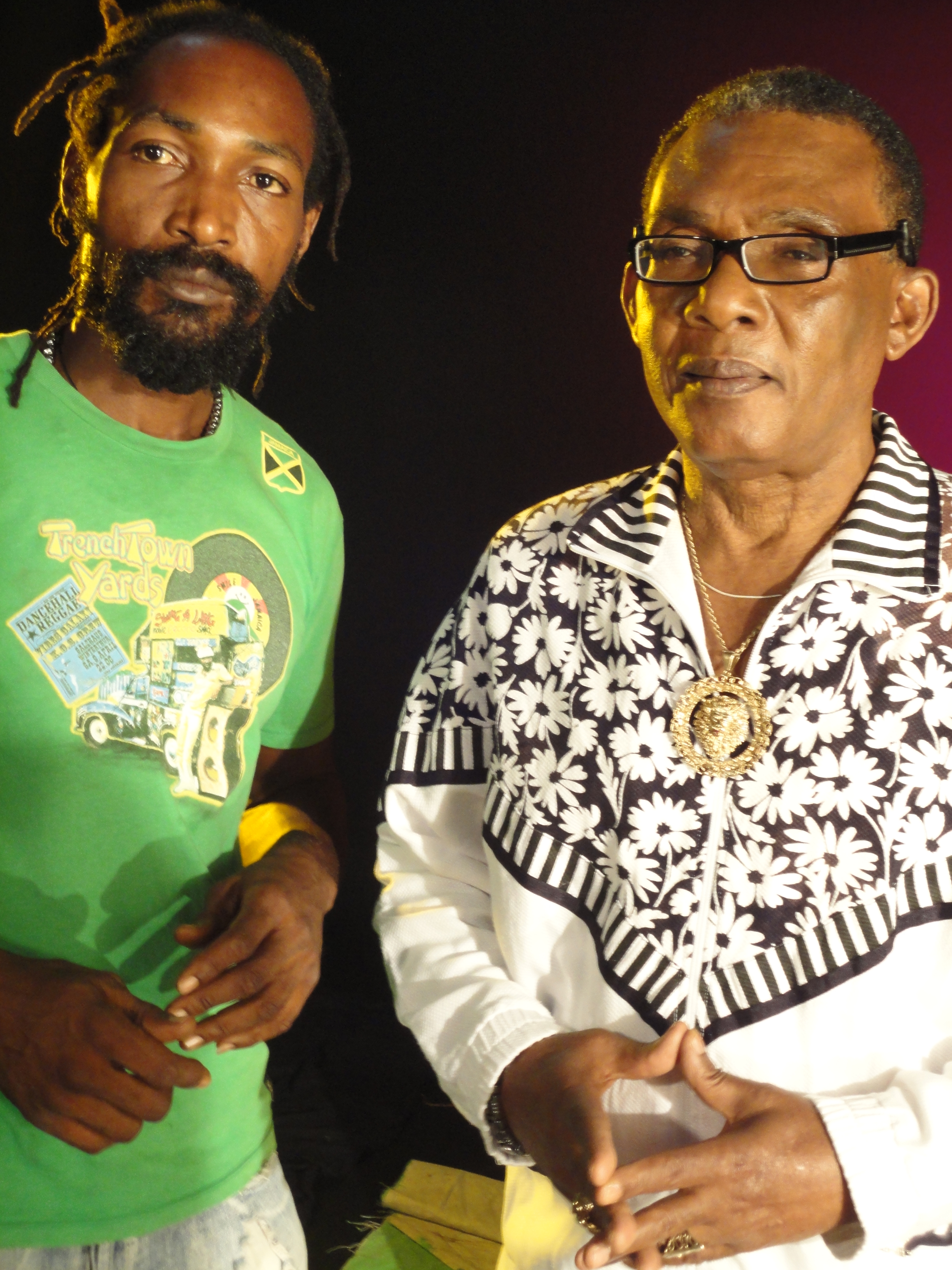
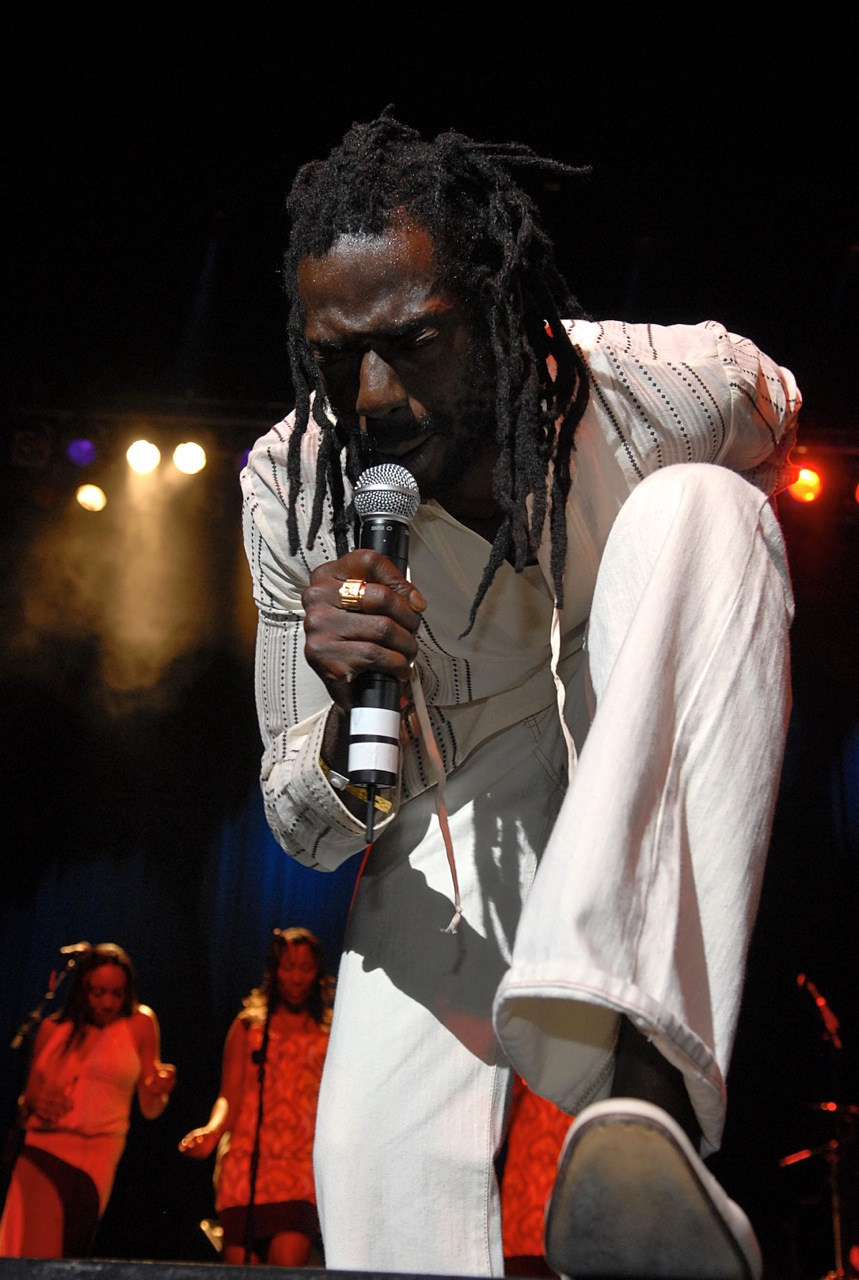
Ken Boothe (left, in white) and Buju Banton (right) are some of the artists that influenced Dizzy Dee and his music

=== Influences ===
One of his earliest musical memories is listening to his parents' vinyl collection, which included The Soul Brothers, Michael Jackson, Ray Phiri. Sibanda collected the infamous Road Warrior cassettes, which had carefully selected reggae and dancehall songs mixed by popular disc jockeys. Sibanda also explored the music of older reggae stars, including Capleton, Beres Hammond, Buju Banton, Sizzla, Gregory Isaacs and Ken Boothe and states reggae as his favourite music. During his teen years he became an MC for Shutter Crew and Saxon Sound, often hanging out with Little Hero and Letsha T, who were amongst the top selectors in Triangle. It was not until he was older that he started writing his own music and contesting in variety shows.

My dad is my biggest model because he has always been strict and I think that has helped me a lot. When I work on projects I take the same approach.

— Dizzy Dee

== Philanthropy ==
Sibanda has been involved in humanitarian support in areas including third world schools, the victims of the 2010 Haitian earthquake, clean water projects in Africa through Oxfam Australia, health research and quality of life. Musically, he has helped fundraise on many occasions.

In February 2010 he performed at a fundraiser at the Evelyn Hotel in Melbourne to raise funds for the Haitian earthquake victims.

In May 2015 Colonel Mustard's held a charity event at Northcote's Bar 303 to raise funds for Orangutan Foundation International. Several DJs from Melbourne performed, including a vocal set from Dizzy Dee.

In 2017 he co-headlined The 36th Annual Bob Marley Outernational held in Western Australia with Etana and Black Slate, with proceeds donated to Oxfam.

== Personal life ==
Sibanda moved to Australia in 2007 on a student visa. In 2010 he was sentenced to 6 years in prison, for rape by the Victorian County court. He was required to serve a minimum of three and a half years before being eligible for parole. He was released in 2013.

== Discography ==
=== Albums ===
==== Studio albums ====
- My Journey (2017) – Soundalize It / VPAL Music
- New Sounds (2018) – Dizzy Dee Music

==== Riddim compilation albums ====
- Tranquility Riddim – various artists (2014), ZJ Heno
- Compatible Riddim – various artists (2015), ZJ Heno / 21st Hapilos Digital
- Summer Love Riddim – various artists (2015), Abra Records
- Focus Riddim – various artists (2016), Black Identity Records

==== As featured artist ====
- Dreamer Believer – Malesh P (2015), Malesh P
- Self Reclaimed – Torch (2015), Frankie Music / VPAL Music
- Culture Shocked – Slicker 1 (2016), TMB Music Group

=== Extended plays ===
- U Don't Care (2009) – Abra Records
- Time Shall Tell (2016) – Soundalize It / VPAL Music

=== Singles ===
==== As lead artist ====
- "Give Me Love" (2014) – Kutral Dub
- "Never See We Fading" featuring Torch (2014) – Soundalize It
- "Perfect Peace" featuring Torch (2015) – ZJ Heno
- "Time Shall Tell" (2015) – Soundalize It
- "Overcome" featuring Beniton (2015) – Soundalize It
- "All That I Need" featuring PASIKA (2017) – Abra Records

==== As featured artist ====
- Don Goliath – "Free Ganja" featuring Dizzy Dee (2014), Rootsstep Division Recordings
- Josmas – "Rambai Muneni" featuring Dizzy Dee (2014), Abra Records

==== Guest appearances ====
- Jusa Dementor – "Ndaku Bikira" (2016), Abra Records

== Tours and concerts ==
=== Headlining ===
- Reggae Faea with Jah Mason (Vanuatu dates) (2008)
- 36th Bob Marley Outernational Festival with Etana & Black Slate (Perth, Australia) (2017)

=== Co-headlining ===
- ZiJudgement Yard – Australia Tour (Australia dates) (2017)

=== Supporting ===
- Richie Spice – Universal Struggle Tour (Australia dates) (2009)
- Brick & Lace – Love Is wicked Tour (Australia dates) (2014)
- Timaya – Australian Tour (Australia dates) (2015)
- Stonebwoy – Australian Tour (Australia dates) (2016)
- Winky D – Ma Problem Ese Disappear Tour (Australia dates) (2016)
- Beenie Man – King of the DanceHall Tour (Australia dates) (2017)
- Stonebwoy – Australian Tour (Australia dates) (2017)
- Bisa Kdei – Road 2 Konnect Australian Tour (Australia dates) (2017)
- Charly Black – Party Animals Australian Tour (Australia dates) (2018)
- Kranium – Can't Believe Australian Tour (Australia dates) (2018)
- Konshens – Bruk Off Yuh Back Australian Tour (Australia dates) (2019)
- Nasty C – Australian Tour (Australia dates) (2019)
- Prince Kaybee & Ali Kiba - MelaninFunk Festival (Melbourne, Australia)(2019)
- DJ Tira – Australian Tour (Australia dates) (2019)

=== Festivals ===
- Saint Kilda Festival 2007
- Saint Kilda Festival 2009
- Island Vibe Festival 2009
- Rainbow Serpent Festival 2010
- Fringe Festival 2010
- Perth International Arts Festival 2010
- Rainbow Serpent Festival 2014
- Strawberry Fields Festival 2016
- Bob Marley Outternational Festival 2017
- Ozlinkup Festival 2017
- Jamaica Music & Food Festival 2017
- Afrobeats Perth Festival 2018
- Afro Urban Music Festival 2019
- Melanin Phunk Festival 2019

=== Television ===
- Live on Bowen 29 November 2013

== Awards and nominations ==
=== Australia Reggae Radio Music Awards ===
| Year | Nominee / work | Award | Result | Ref |
|---|---|---|---|---|
| 2017 | Himself | Reggae Performer/Band of the year | Nominated | |
| 2017 | Himself | Reggae/Dancehall song of the year | Nominated | |

=== Zimbabwe Achievers Awards ===
| Year | Nominee / work | Award | Result | Ref |
|---|---|---|---|---|
| 2017 | Himself | Artist of the year | Nominated | |

=== Star FM Music Awards ===
| Year | Nominee / work | Award | Result | Ref |
|---|---|---|---|---|
| 2019 | Elders | Best Song by Zimbabwean in the Diaspora | Nominated | |
