= Feli Nandi =

Zimbabwean singer and songwriter

- Born: Felistus Winnie Chipendo; Zimbabwe
- Origin: Harare, Zimbabwe
- Genres: Afro-soul; Afro pop
- Occupations: Singer; songwriter; fashion designer
- Instrument: Vocals
- Years active: 2021–present
- Spouse: Lameck Batai

Felistus Chipendo, best known by her stage name Feli Nandi, is a Zimbabwean singer, songwriter and fashion designer. Her music is a combination of soul music containing elements from Afro-fusion. She is also the owner of the clothing line Feli Nandi Apparel, which she formed in 2021.

== Early life and career ==
She started her music career as a backing vocalist for Mbeu's Mhodzi Tribe for two years. She left the band to pursue a solo career and gained popularity in 2020 after releasing the single "Mufudzi WeMombe" with Trevor Dongo.

She was inspired by local traditional music artists such as Oliver Mtukudzi, Thomas Mapfumo, Chiwoniso Maraire and began writing her own songs when she was in secondary school. Her career started as a backing vocalist for Mbeu's Mhodzi Tribe for two years. During her time with Mbeu, she managed to record six singles including "Ndega Ndada", which had an accompanying music video. She then left the band to pursue a solo career and gained popularity in 2020 after releasing the single "Mufudzi WeMombe" with Trevor Dongo.

In 2021, she released her self-titled album 'Feli Nandi'. Her singles such as "Munhu Wangu", "Unotyei" and "Kukurumidza" gained popularity and airplay on local radio stations.

In February 2022, she was nominated for outstanding newcomer and outstanding female musician at the 2022 National Arts Merit Awards.

In May 2022, she released her debut album Izwi. The album was nominated for best album at the 2023 Zimbabwe Music Awards. That same year, she also won an award for Best Female artist at the Zimbabwe Music Awards and Best alternative for her single "Ndoona Iwe" at the Star FM Music Awards.

She has performed at major music events in Zimbabwe and has toured the UK for the JamAfro Family Festival Show, South Africa, Togo.

Other singles that she released include "Women", which she dedicated to her mother as well as covers of Mbeu's "Hazvinei" and "Ndibateiwo".

== Discography ==
- Feli Nandi (2021)
- Izwi (2022)

== Awards and nominations ==
Year	Award ceremony	Prize	Result	Ref
2022	National Arts Merit Awards	Outstanding Newcomer	Nominated	
2022	National Arts Merit Awards	Outstanding Female Musician	Nominated	
2023	Zimbabwe Music Awards	Best Female Musician	Won	
2023	Zimbabwe Music Awards	Best album	Nominated	
2023	Zimbabwe Music Awards	Best Afropop/Afrofusion	Nominated	
2023	Star FM Music Awards	Best Female artist	Won	
2023	Star FM Music Awards	Best alternative	Won	
2023	National Arts Merit Awards	Outstanding Female Musician	Nominated	
