= Feliciano =

Feliciano may refer to:

== People ==
- Feliciano (name), including a list of people with the name

== Places ==
- San José de Feliciano, Argentine city
- Feliciano River, river in Argentina
- Estadio Feliciano Gambarte, stadium in Argentina
- Dom Feliciano, municipality in Brazil
