= Time Shall Tell (EP) =

Time Shall Tell – EP

EP by Dizzy Dee
- Released: 22 July 2016
- Recorded: Melbourne, Australia
- Genre: Reggae
- Length: 21:28
- Label: Soundalize It Records/VPAL Music
- Producer: Dizzy Dee, LionRiddims, RiddimWise

Dizzy Dee chronology
U Don't Care EP (2009)	Time Shall Tell – EP (2016)	New Sounds (2018)

Singles from Time Shall Tell – EP
- 1. "Never See We Fading feat. Torch" Released: August 26, 2014; 2. "Time Shall Tell" Released: June 9, 2015; 3. "Overcome feat. Beniton" Released: July 21, 2015

Time Shall Tell is the first internationally released EP by the reggae artist Dizzy Dee released in 2016. LionRiddims take part in the achievement of this album. According to Dizzy Dee and Reggaelizeit.com, the EP has made international progress. The 6-track EP is a collection of musicians and producers from Jamaica, Romania, Canada, USA, Germany, Australia and Vanuatu.

The EP was produced by LionRiddims and Riddim Wise and made available for digital purchase under Romanian label Soundalize it! Records and VPAL Music. All tracks were mixed and mastered by Dizzy Dee at Just4FunGrafix in Melbourne, Australia

== Track listing ==
1. "Never See We Fading" (Feat. Torch) – 3:40
2. "Special Feeling" – 3:19
3. "Overcome" (Feat. Beniton) – 4:01
4. "Time Shall Tell" – 3:55
5. "Wake Up & Live" (Feat. Jah Tung & Tujah) – 4:07
6. "Stay Focused" (Feat. Saralene) [Bonus track] – 4:08

== Production notes ==
- Executive Producers: Dizzy Dee.
- Engineers: Vlad Sfichi & Dizzy Dee.
- Mixed and Mastered - Dizzy Dee.
- Art Direction - Filip Müller.
- Art & Design - Graphillip.

== See also ==
- Dizzy Dee discography
- VPAL
- VP Records
