= Soul Jah Love =

Zimbabwean artist and musician (1989–2021)

- Born: Soul Muzavazi Musaka; 22 November 1989
- Died: 16 February 2021 (aged 31); Harare, Zimbabwe
- Resting place: Warren Hills Cemetery
- Spouse: none
- Children: none
- Musical career
- Genres: Zimdancehall
- Occupations: Musical artist; songwriter
- Instrument: Vocals
- Years active: 2000s–2021

Soul Muzavazi Musaka, known professionally as Soul Jah Love or Chibaba (22 November 1989 – 16 February 2021), was a Zimbabwean musician credited as a pioneer of mainstream Zimdancehall. He was declared a hero for his contributions to music. Among several hit singles, Soul Jah Love had tracks "Ndini Uya Uya", "Gum-kum" (2012), "Pamamonya Ipapo." (2016) Posthumous work included "Ndichafa Rinhi" (2021). He also won numerous ZIMA, NAMA awards for "Ndini Uya Uya", "Gum-kum" (2012), "Pamamonya Ipapo." (2016). "Ndini Uya Uya", "Gum-kum" (2012), "Pamamonya Ipapo." (2016) were the first major hits that brought the late Soul Jah Love international recognition in Dancehall.

== Death ==
Soul Jah Love died at the age of 31 after succumbing to diabetes upon arrival at Mbuya Dorcus Hospital, which was diagnosed when he was seven years old. Due to his impact on the youths, helping fight against drug abuse by using his voice and talent, he was named a provincial hero. He was laid to rest at Warren Hills Cemetery in Harare where he received a military ovation send off. Leading to his death, Soul Jah Love had been in the spotlight due to his latest released songs which spoke of depression, loneliness among others.
