= Michael Mahendere =

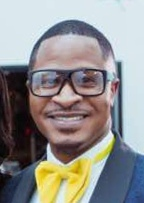

Background information
- Born: May 28, 1983 (age 43)
- Genres: Gospel
- Occupations: Musician, Pastor, Producer, Music Director, Song Writer, Band Manager
- Years active: 1994–present
- Website: www.ministermahendere.com
- Spouse: Vimbai Mahendere (m. 2011)
- Children: 3

Michael Mahendere born 28 May 1983 is a Zimbabwean gospel musician, preacher and businessman. Mahendere is a pastor at United Family International Church under Emmanuel Makandiwa. He rose to prominence after re-arranged the song, Makanaka Jesu together with the UFI Choir, which became a hit and is also well known for his album, Getting Personal With God II with hits such as Mumoyo. He is usually associated with the title, "Minister" Michael Mahendere.

== Biography ==
Minister Michael Mahendere was born on 28 May 1983. He grew up in a family of seven children, with him being the fourth child. His brothers are Akim, Misheck, and Amos, among the other siblings and their parents are devout Christians who always taught their children Christian morals which Michael Mahendere commends them for.

== Music career ==
Minister Michael Mahendere started music at the age of seven in 1990. He began his career being part of the group, Mahendere Brothers which consisted of his brothers Akim, Misheck, and Amos. Their first album was Mwari Mukuru in 1994 which topped the charts in Southern Africa. Michael Mahendere was only eleven at this time. He believed there was more he could do to develop himself in terms of music and although he had limited resources, he began to learn how to play instruments. He started learning the acoustic guitar which his father had bought for them. He then learnt to play the keyboard and the drums in 1998. He never had actual drums but he improvised to develop his skill. Some of the projects he did with his brothers include Rumbidzo and Mapisarema 23.

In 2001, Michael Mahendere began to do commercials such as 'Go Warriors, Go' for the Zimbabwe Soccer Team. These projects saw him collaborating with some top musicians such as the Ruvhuvhuto Sisters, in the ‘Come to Victoria Falls’ project. He also joined the popular group, Pax Afro and did a twenty-six track music project with them. Michael Mahendere claims this venture gave him exposure in his career. In 2009, Michael Mahendere became a Music Director at the University of Zimbabwe and launched a Chinese Choral group which became attached to the Confucius Institute. He spent about four years travelling to and fro

and China. Michael Mahendere declined a scholarship to study Music in China as he had found a home at the United Family International Church where he served in the choir.

In 2011, the church's choir (UFI Choir) did a musical project in which Michael Mahendere led a song called Makanaka Jesu, which has over 1.8 million YouTube views. The song became a hit up-to date and topped radio and television charts in the country.

== Getting Personal with God ==
Michael Mahendere is synonymous with his album series, Getting Personal with God. His solo debut album was in 2012 where he recorded Getting Personal with God 1 with his band, Direct Worship. The album consisted of 15 songs. It was then modified into an 11 track album, excluding Songs like You are Faithul (everyday, everyhour). His Debut Album contained hits like We Are Soldiers, Love Song and Holy Forever. In 2013, Michael Mahendere and Direct Worship managed to record their second offering which was Getting Personal with God 2 which has the hit song, Mumoyo and this was followed by the Getting Personal with God 2 Live DVD recording at the New Life Temple in Eastlea, Harare, Zimbabwe on 21 November 2014.

In 2017, Michael Mahendere released his third offering, Getting Personal with God III, which comprises 10 tracks, including the popular song, Salt of the Earth and also his collaboration with Loyiso Bala, Chiiko as the sixth track. Chiiko has been dominant on the gospel radio charts in Zimbabwe.

Michael Mahendere also recorded The Getting Personal with God III Live DVD to close the chapter of his 2017 endeavors. The successful event also marked the second volume of Mahendere’s Classical Worship Project which has caught the attention of many.

At the end of 2021, Mahendere released his fourth offering of the Getting Personal with God Album Series, titled "Mercy". This Album contained songs such as the main hit single Zvaringana ( It is well), Kudza Jehovah, Tangai Neni and Nyasha Dzaishe. ( Which is based on The Grace confession)

== Singles ==
Mahendere released Worship Classics in 2015, a four track single which consists mainly of Zimbabwean classic hymnals. In March 2016, Mahendere also released a single entitled Mandiri, which was packaged with a bonus video of his song, Mweya Mutsvene. Michael Mahendere also featured the South African artist, Loyiso Bala in September 2016 on the single, Chiiko.

== Marriage ==
Michael Mahendere married Vimbai Nyatsambo in December 2011. Vimbai works alongside Michael Mahendere in his work and is the co-manager of his band, Direct Worship. They are well known for their powerful collaborations such as Zvichanaka from Getting Personal with God 2 and also Masimba from Getting Personal with God III.

The two have four children together.

== Spiritual fatherhood and influences ==
Michael and Vimbai Mahendere submit to the charismatic preachers; Emmanuel and Ruth Makandiwa who are also the leaders of the church he attends, United Family International Church. Michael Mahendere is a senior pastor at this ministry and he constantly publicizes how Emmanuel Makandiwa changed his life through prayer and the Word of God that he preaches. Michael Mahendere says that Emmanuel Makandiwa ordained him to flow in his music career and also claims that his popularity is because of Emmanuel Makandiwa's prayers upon his life.

Michael Mahendere is also influenced by the work of Ghanaian International singer Sonnie Badu, Minister Sark, Kirk Franklin, Hillsong, Bethel Music, Jesus Culture, and local Worshipper Larry Gunda.

== Awards ==
Permican Awards 2019

Best Male Artist – ‘Salt of The Earth’ (Live)

Most Viewed Song Online - 'Salt of the Earth'

Independent National Gospel Music Awards (INGOMA) 2018

Best African Gospel Artist Of The Year Award For 2018

Permican Awards 2016

Video of the Year: Kune Mponesi - feat Janet Manyowa

Permican Awards 2015

Best Album of the year for Getting Personal with God & Best Male Artist
