= Mbare Musika =

Coordinates: 17°51′28″S 31°02′19″E

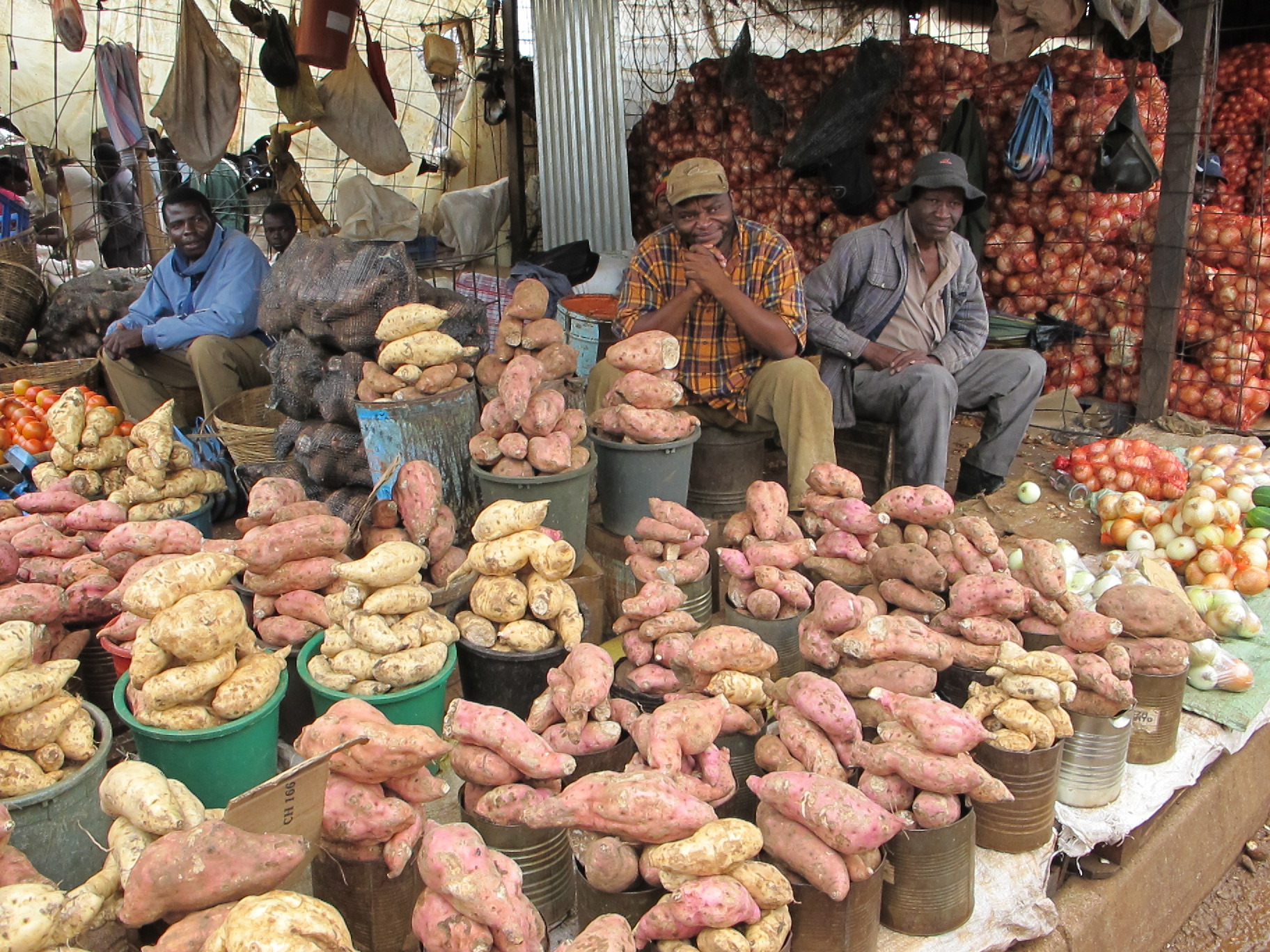
Vegetables for sale at Mbare Musika

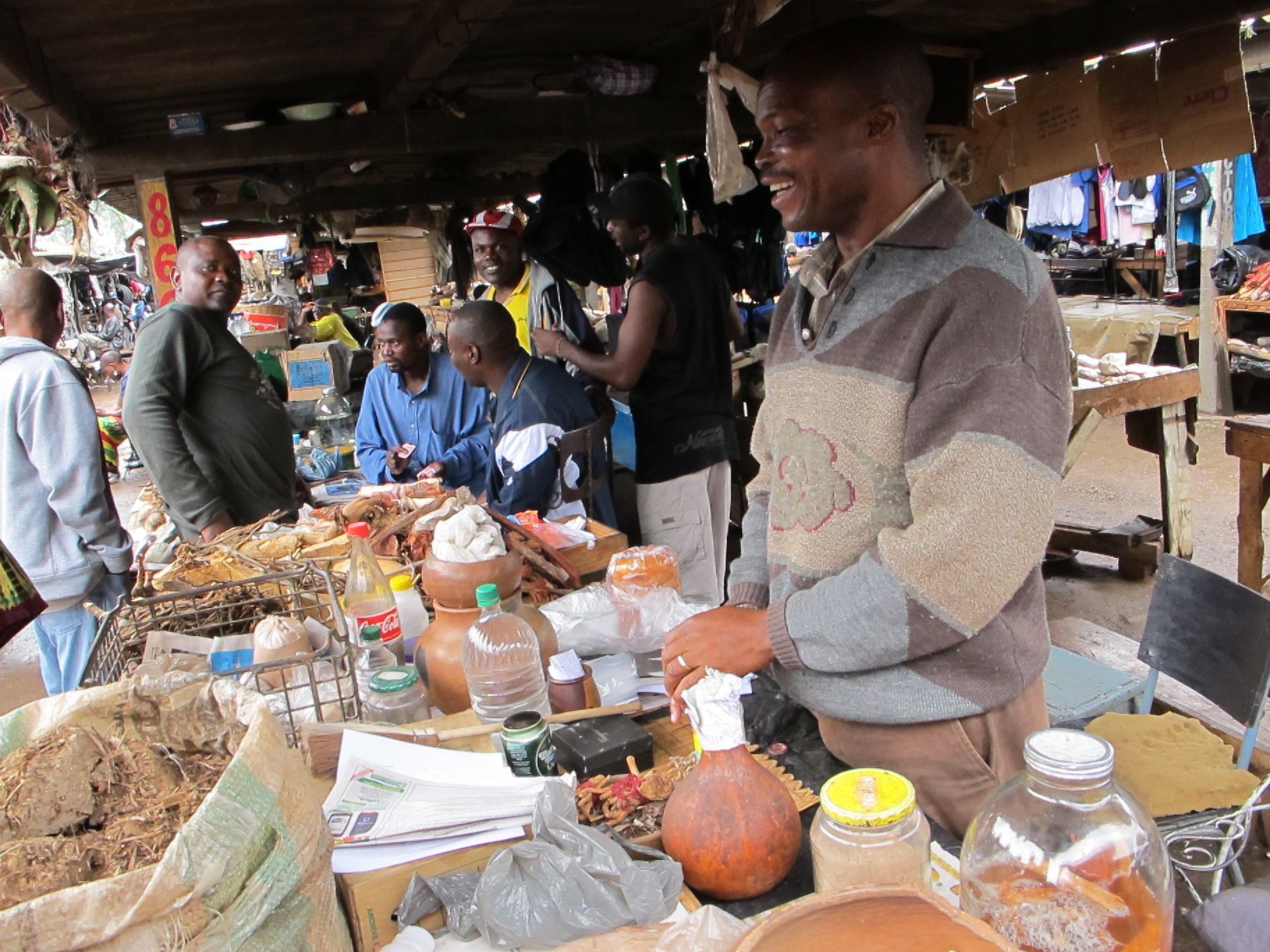
Venders at Mbare Musika

Mbare Musika is the major trading market for vegetables and fruits in Mbare suburb of Harare, Zimbabwe. It acts as the distribution centre for agricultural produce in Zimbabwe. It is also the major bus station for rural bound and incoming transport. It has been the most important and significant trading and transport centre in Zimbabwe but has fallen into disrepair in recent years.
