= Mbare, Harare =

Southern suburb of Harare, Zimbabwe

Coordinates: 17°51′34″S 31°02′49″E

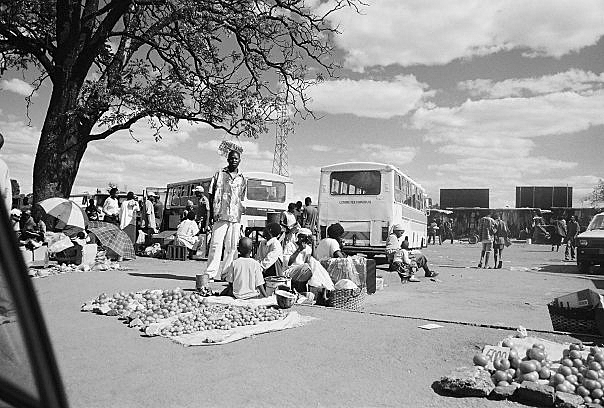
Vendors at Mbare

Mbare, originally known as Harari, is a suburb in the south of Harare, Zimbabwe. Founded in 1907 as a township, it includes an informal settlement. Mbare Musika is the largest farm produce market in Zimbabwe.

== History ==
Part of Mbare township before Operation Murambatsvina

The same area after Operation Murambatsvina

Mbare was the first township, now known as a high density area, established in 1907. It was originally called Harari and much of it was constructed after 1950. Before the 1980s, the government built the Matapi flats. A total of fourteen blocks of apartments were built to house bachelors who came to Harare (then Salisbury) to find employment.

Since the 1980s, the apartments have become multifamily, with the rooms divided by curtains or boxes. The population of the flats has grown from 3,000 to an estimated 28,000 to 30,000.

For Independence Day in 1980, Bob Marley was personally invited by Edgar Tekere, and played a concert in Rufaro Stadium.

In 2001, over 500,000 people were displaced from their Mbare homes when the council demolished 145,000 homes they declared were illegal. Significant portions of Mbare, including the Mupedzanhamo Flea Market, were destroyed by police and military forces during Operation Murambatsvina in May 2005, when President Robert Mugabe described the inhabitants as "people without totems".

On 4 January 2026, heavy rains triggered flooding in the Mbare area of Harare.

== Economy and markets ==
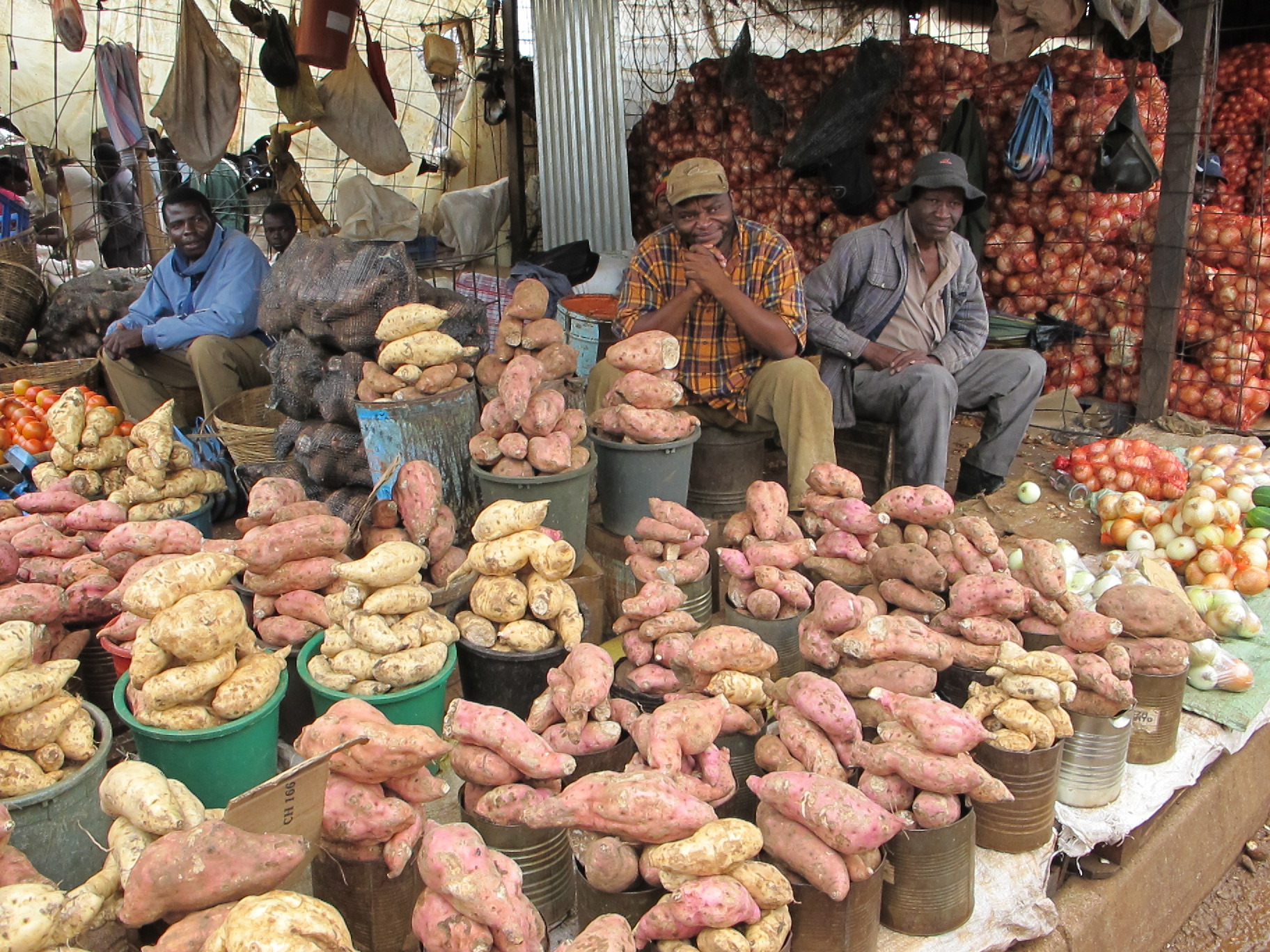
Vegetables for sale at Mbare Musika

Mbare has Mbare Musika, the largest farm produce market in Zimbabwe. Farmers deliver their fresh crops every morning and some travel from far away places like Mutare, Masvingo and Kariba to sell their produce. This area has fallen into disrepair in recent years. When Elizabeth II, Queen of the United Kingdom, visited Zimbabwe in 1991 as part of the Commonwealth Heads of Government Meeting, she expressed a desire to see Mbare Musika. The government, therefore, launched a court case to evict squatters she might see on her journey. In "The City of Harare v Tichaona Mudzingwa and 193 others", the High Court stated the government had no reason to evict the squatters, then the government simply forcibly resettled them on a farm 30 kilometres outside Harare.

== Politics ==
For elections to the Parliament of Zimbabwe, it is part of the Mbare constituency.

== Notable residents ==
- Thomas Mapfumo
- Leonard Mapfumo
- Dj Fantan

Dr Leonard Tsumba, Dr Herbert Murerwa Dr Gibson Mandishona George Shaya
