= Shingisai Suluma =

Zimbabwean singer (born 1971)

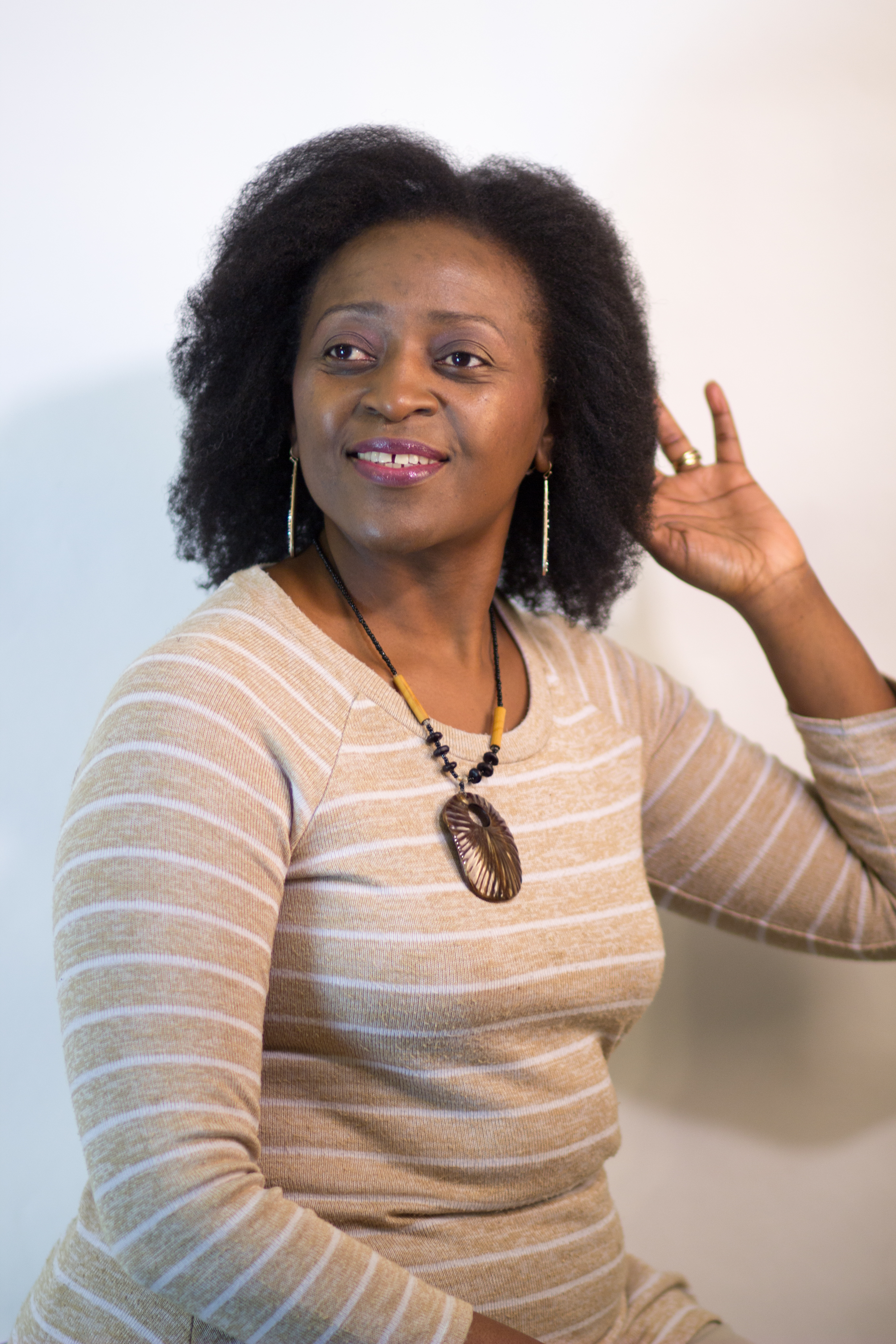

Background information
- Born: Shingisai Chadoka; February 28, 1971 (age 55); Gweru, Zimbabwe
- Origin: Harare, Zimbabwe
- Genres: Gospel, Christian
- Occupation: Singer-songwriter
- Years active: 1995–present
- Label: Kether Productions
- Website: shingisai.com

Shingisai Suluma (born 1971) is a Zimbabwean Christian singer, songwriter and worship leader.

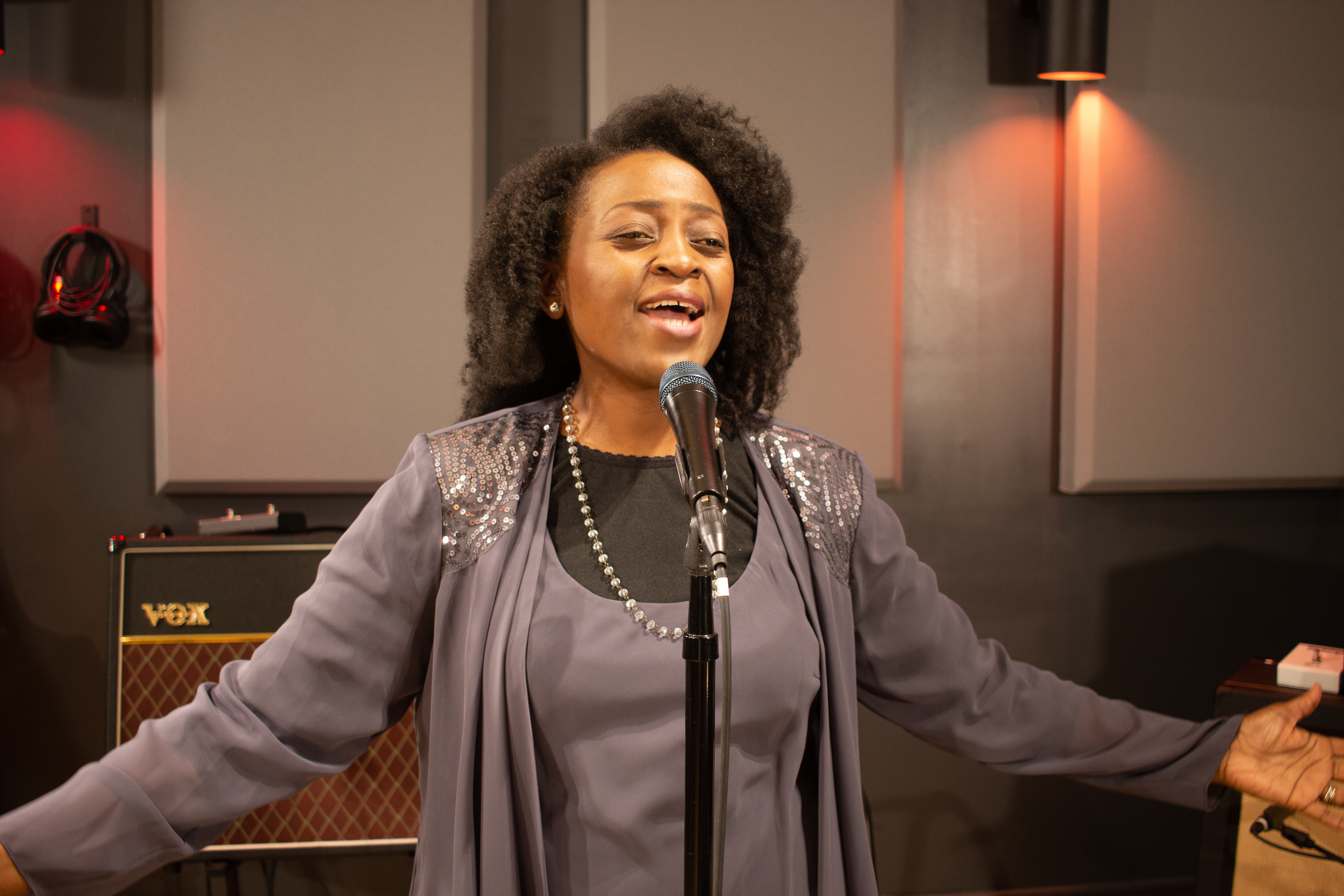
Till I found You - Cover Recording

== Biography ==
Shingisai Suluma was born to Christopher and Dorcas Chadoka in 1971. Shingisai's parents were musically inclined; they both sang in church. She and her sister were made to sing, without a personal drive to. At about the age of seven she performed at the national conference of her church, and by the age of 17 she was the choir leader of the Braeside assembly of Zimbabwe Assemblies of God Africa. She recorded her first album in 1995 and has currently a total of 9 albums. Apart from music, Suluma is a still life and textile artist. She has spent years teaching in high schools around Harare, Zimbabwe. She is married to Pastor Stephen Suluma and they have two daughters, Tashinga and Tiara.

== Education ==
Shingisai went to Chembira and Kudakwashe primary schools in Glen Norah, and later to Nettleton Junior School in Braeside. She completed her O-level education at Hatfield Girls High School and proceeded to Oriel Girls School for her A-Level studies. She left Zimbabwe to study art in Wimbledon, England, before graduating with a Bachelor of Arts degree in textile and design at Surrey University. After returning to Zimbabwe she worked for years as an art teacher at Oriel Girls School, Alan Wilson Boys School, and Eaglesvale Secondary School. During the same period, she established herself as one of the most prominent gospel artists in Zimbabwe, and recorded multiple Christian albums. She studied teaching English as a second language before moving to China to teach the language. She later moved to the United States for further studies, and in 2015 she graduated with a Master of Arts in Christian Education from New Orleans Baptist Theological Seminary.

== National Awards ==
- National Arts Merit Awards - Outstanding Song - Nanhasi
- Zimbabwe Music Awards (3 times) Best Female Gospel

== Discography ==
- 1995 - Zvanaka
- 1998 - Huyai Ishe Jesu
- 2000 - Mumaoko
- 2002 - Nokuti Wakanaka
- 2004 - Fara Zvakadaro
- 2005 - Tatenda Taona
- 2007 - Maitiro Enyu
- 2009 - Ndewake
- 2013 - Rwendo
- 2016 - Masuwo
- 2016 - O Holy Night-Usiku Hutsvene
- 2017 - Pano Patasvika
- 2017 - Munamato
