= Tocky Vibes =

Tocky Vibes a.k.a Chamakuvangu or Huruyadzo
- Born: Obey Makamure; 29 November 1993 (age 32); Harare, Zimbabwe
- Genres: Dancehall, Afropop, Experimental, Reggae, Spiritual, Afrobeats
- Occupations: Singer; Lyricist; Songwriter; Poet
- Years active: 2009–present
- Labels: Chillspot Records, *Mount Zion Music

Obey Makambureyi (born 29 November 1993), popularly known under the stage name Tocky Vibes, is a Zimbabwean award-winning Zimdancehall artist, songwriter and lyricist. He has released multiple singles.

== Early life ==
Makamure was born in Rugare Suburb, Harare. He was first spotted by top Zimdancehall artist Winky D, which led to recordings of his earlier music. His parents wanted him to focus on his studies and thought the music scene would affect his studies. They moved him back to their rural home in Chivi Masvingo Province, and later he moved to their farm in Rusape outside of Mutare . Later local reggae and dancehall artist Emmanuel "Guspy Warrior mafia19" Manyeruke took him in and helped reignite his career. He made frequent visits to Harare to record until he decided to reside in the capital permanently.

== Music career ==
Tocky Vibes released an album Toti Toti in 2015. The album was recorded using live instruments. Before the album Toti Toti he won awards at the Zimdancehall awards in 2015 for the songs Tocky Aenda Nenyika and Mhai. He is considered one of the most talented artists in Zimbabwe because of his lyrics which have a rich social message. Being talented the young man took it by storm and now has another single hit song in 2018 called Chamakuvangu and one above all called Kendura. Faith is yet another and its real that the young man has take it by storm ( Aenda nenyika )

== Controversy ==
In 2020 a man named John Vashico, a Tocky Vibes look alike made rounds in Glendale claiming to be the musician's father. Vashico claimed to have fathered Tocky Vibes and other 10 children and deserted them. The claims were dismissed by Tocky Vibes surfacing pictures with his biological father who is based in South Africa.

== Discography ==
=== Studio albums ===
List of albums
Title	Album Details	Number of Tracks
Toti Toti	released 2015	8
Bhora Mutambo	released 2016	14
Rori	released 2018	19
Chamakuvangu	released 2018	23
The Villagers Money, vol. 1	released 2019	14
The Villagers Money, vol. 2	released 2019	13
Dhongi newaya	released 2020	22
Long Live Chama	released 2020	12
Mabhiritiyana| Rori	released 2021	16
Ngoma Kurira	released 2021	25
Chicken and Chama	released 2022	36
Long Live Chama 2	released 2022	10
Mashangurapata	released 2025	94

=== Hit Songs ===
- Mhai
- Tocky Aenda neNyika
- Usakande Mapfumo pasi
- Dziripo Hama
- Ndini Ndinorira
- Ngoma Dzonaka
- Mukoma Ndazokundikana
- Kure KweGava
- Level Rakaipa
- Hande Tocky
- Toti Toti
- KuHope
- Bhora mutambo
- Malaika
- Tipei Maoko
- Tushiri
- Shoka
- Kenduro
- Chama
- Nyaya Yangu

== Awards ==
- Zimbabwe Music Awards People's Choice Award 2014

=== Zimdancehall Awards 2014 ===
- Best Male Artist
- Best Social Message
- Song of the Year
