= United Family International Church =

Nondenominational Christian megachurch and network

- Classification: Evangelicalism
- Theology: Nondenominational
- Headquarters: Harare, Zimbabwe
- Founder: Emmanuel Makandiwa
- Origin: 17 August 2008 (18 years ago)
- Official website: ufiministries.org

United Family International Church are a Nondenominational megachurch and a church network. The headquarters is located in Harare, Zimbabwe, with branches in Botswana, South Africa, the United Kingdom, Australia and Zambia. The church is led by Emmanuel Makandiwa.

== History ==
The church started with a prayer service on 17 August 2008 at the Anglican Cathedral in Harare, which was led by Emmanuel Makandiwa. In 2011, the church began construction of a 30,000 seat auditorium in Chitungwiza, but construction was stopped in 2013 for 18 months due to investigations by regulators; however, the church was allowed to resume construction by the Environmental Management Agency in February 2015. The auditorium was opened in 2022. In 2013, the church launched Christ TV, which broadcasts sermons and church services.

== Beliefs ==
The association has a charismatic confession of faith.
