= Feliciano (name) =

Feliciano is a Spanish, Portuguese, and Italian name. Notable people with the name include:

== Given name ==
- Feliciano Belmonte Jr. (born 1936), Filipino politician
- Feliciano Centurión (born 1962), Paraguayan painter
- Feliciana Coronel (1964–1996), Paraguayan lesbian rights activist
- Feliciano Leviste (1898-1972), Filipino politician
- Feliciano López (born 1981), Spanish tennis player
- Feliciano Magro (born 1979), Swiss footballer
- Feliciano Perducca (1901–1976), Argentine footballer
- Feliciano Rivilla (1936–2017), former Spanish footballer
- Feliciano de Silva (1491–1554), Spanish writer
- Feliciano Viera (1872-1927), Uruguayan politician

== Middle name ==
- António Feliciano de Castilho (1800–1875), Portuguese writer
- Carmelo Feliciano Lazatin Sr. (1934–2018), Filipino politician and businessman
- Cinézio Feliciano Peçanha (born 1960), Brazilian musician
- Edson Feliciano Sitta (born 1983), Brazilian footballer

== Surname ==
- Cheo Feliciano (1935-2014), Puerto Rican composer and singer of salsa and bolero music
- Felice Feliciano (1433-1479), Italian calligrapher and composer
- Francisco Feliciano (1941–2014), Filipino composer and conductor
- Héctor Feliciano (born 1952), Puerto Rican author
- Jesús Feliciano (born 1979), Puerto Rican baseball player for the New York Mets
- José Feliciano (born 1945), Puerto Rican singer and guitarist
- Marco Feliciano (born 1972), Brazilian politician and pastor
- Mario Feliciano (born 1998), Puerto Rican baseball player
- Michael Feliciano (born 1983), American drag queen also known as Roxxxy Andrews
- Pedro Feliciano (1976-2021), Puerto Rican baseball player for the New York Mets

== Fictional Characters ==
- Feliciano Vargas, also known as North Italy or Veneziano from the 2009 anime Hetalia
