= Zimbabwe Achievers Awards =

Zimbabwe awards ceremony

- Awarded for: Recognising notable achievements of Zimbabweans based in the diaspora
- Location: United Kingdom
- First award: 2010
- Website: www.zimachievers.com

Zimbabwe Achievers Awards (Z.A.A.) also referred to as Zim Achievers Awards is an awards ceremony that seeks to recognise Zimbabweans based in the diaspora for outstanding and notable achievements. Among the awards recipients include Hollywood actress Danai Gurira of The Walking Dead TV Series, and Black Panther; Chipo Chung as well as Luthuli Dhlamini of South Africa's TV Series Generations.

== History ==
The Zimbabwe Achievers Awards (Z.A.A.) was founded in 2010 by Conrad Mwanza, a Zimbabwean businessman who is based in the United Kingdom. He worked closely with his founding partners including UK based Zimbabwean public figure, entertainer and millionaire Peter Soxx Soko and also Washington Kapapiro now in Africa. The ZAA currently has four editions which are the UK Edition, the USA Edition, the Australian Edition and the South African Edition.

Over the years, the ceremony has had several different sponsors including Steward Bank, Food World, Mukuru, Fastjet, Impala Car Rental and Hamilton Insurance. The most recent partnership was with WorldRemit.

London Fintech Company, WorldRemit were announced as the global partner for ZAA International in March 2018. They headlined the event in 2018 which honoured the achievements of Zimbabweans in the UK. The company also partnered to headline the South African, USA and Australian editions.

== 2018 UK Edition ==
The 2018 Z.A.A awards hosted Tsitsi Masiyiwa, the wife of Zimbabwe's first billionaire businessman Strive Masiyiwa. Tsitsi Masiyiwa was the keynote speaker of the UK Edition on 26 May 2018 in London

== Awards categories ==
- Business Of The Year
- Male Entrepreneur Of The Year
- Female Entrepreneur Of The Year
- Professional Of The Year
- Community Champion Of The Year
- Music Video Of The Year
- Music Artist Of The Year
- International Gospel Artist Of The Year
- Male Personality Of The Year
- Female Personality Of The Year
- Sports Personality Of The Year
- Fashion Designer Of The Year
- Event Of The Year
- People's Choice
- Break Through Award
- Young Achiever Of The Year

== Top awards recipients ==
- Strive Masiyiwa
- Tsitsi Masiyiwa
- Patrick Mavros
- Tongayi Chirisa
- Danai Gurira
- Chipo Chung
- Luthuli Dlamini
- Chiedza Mhende
- Ernest Ndlovu
- Jah Seed
- Jah Prayzah
- Buffalo Souljah
- Nadia Nakai
- Oliver Mtukudzi
- Thomas Mapfumo
- Brian Nhira
- Tinashe
- Dj Edu
- Farai Gundan
- Taponeswa Mavunga
- Petina Gappah
- Hugh Masekela
- Derick Chisora
- Khama Billiat
- Esrom Nyandoro
- Kirsty Coventry
- Hillzy
- Takesure Zamar Ncube
- Kazz A.K.A Mr Boomslang
- Zimcelebs
