= Zimbabwe Music Awards =

Annual award ceremony

ZIMA
- Awarded for: Music
- Date: 2003
- Country: Zimbabwe
- Website: https://zimmusicawards.co.zw

The Zimbabwe Music Awards (ZIMA) is an annual award ceremony to acknowledge and honor musical excellence and creativity in Zimbabwean music.
