= Star FM Music Awards =

Zimbabwean music awards

- Current: Star FM Music Awards 2019
- Awarded for: The Star FM Music Awards is an annual event set to honour the radio station's outstanding musicians.
- Country: Zimbabwe
- Presented by: Star FM
- First award: February 1, 2019; 7 years ago
- Website: https://www.starfmmusicawards.co.zw/

The Star FM Music Awards were established in 2019 by Star FM to celebrate outstanding musicians on their radio station. The awards are presented annually, and are broadcast live on Facebook. The annual presentation ceremony features performances by artists.

== Host cities ==
Locations of the Star FM Music Awards ceremonies.

Year	Country	Host city	Venue	Host(s)
2019	Zimbabwe	Harare	Zimbali Gardens	Mai Judah, V Candy

== Current award categories ==
- Artist of the Year
- Best Male Artist
- Best Female Artist
- Best Duo/Group
- Best African Pop Song
- Best Sungura Song
- Best Zimdancehall Song
- Best Hiphop Song
- Best RnB Song
- Best House Song
- Best Song by Zimbabwean in the Diaspora
- Best Gospel Song
- Best Newcomer
- Best Collaboration
- Best Producer
- Song of the Year
- Album of the Year

== Past award winners ==
=== 2019 ===
- Artist of the Year
- Best Male Artist
- Best Female Artist
- Best Duo/Group
- Best African Pop Song
- Best Sungura Song
- Best Zimdancehall Song
- Best Hiphop Song
- Best RnB Song
- Best House Song
- Best Song by Zimbabwean in the Diaspora
- Best Gospel Song
- Best Newcomer
- Best Collaboration
- Best Producer
- Song of the Year
- Album of the Year
