= Zimdancehall =

Music genre

Zimdancehall, or Zimbabwean dancehall, is a subgenre of reggae and dancehall music, emerging in the late 20th century, with heavy influences from Jamaican dancehall traditions, whilst simultaneously incorporating local languages and culture. It is characterized by rhythmic chanting, adaptations of Jamaican riddims, and the use of lyrical themes that address issues like poverty, politics, social inequality, and everyday life whilst living in Zimbabwe. Although initially dismissed as an imitation, it developed into a very distinctly Zimbabwean form of musical expression, eventually becoming one of the more dominant genres contained within the country's contemporary music scene.

It has been noted by several scholars that Zimdancehall serves purposes other than entertainment, which include a means of identity formation for the youth, and a way to provide social commentary, popular in marginalized communities. The growth took place at the same time as many political and economic challenges present in Zimbabwe during the 2000s, shaping the primary themes and common methods of distribution.

== History ==
=== Origins and Jamaican influence ===
Zimdancehall started in the late 1980s, coinciding with the rise of sound system culture present in Zimbabwe at the time.It developed as a genre through continued exposure to Jamaican reggae and dancehall, which had both achieved global success and circulation. Early artists adapted several of these Jamaican rhythms and performance styles while incorporating local sayings and slang into their lyrics. The dancehall inspiration is also seen in the chanting styles, riddims, and street performances of the genre.

=== Growth and popularization ===
During the early 2000s, there was a rise in the amount of independent studios, and increased access to informal spaces for recording, causing a surge in young artists producing and distributing their own music, independent of a label. Coinciding with this was the decline of the Urban Grooves movement.

One artist in the genre's popularization was Winky D, who produced several commercially successful releases, which broadened the appeal beyond that of the local neighborhoods. By the end of the 2000s, Zimdancehall maintained a major presence in Zimbabwean media consumption, especially that of radio programming, leading to a high impact on youth culture.

=== Themes and cultural significance ===
Several academic studies have noted Zimdancehall's engagement with issues like political instability, generational frustration, and economic hardship. It frequently centers on specific lived experiences of youth, allowing for those traditionally without a voice to be heard.

There has also been examination of the way that social media and digital culture are portrayed in Zimdancehall. Often, artists, through their lyrics, critique social media, whilst simultaneously using these platforms to disseminate and promote their music. The duality also reflects several tensions present within the youth culture in Zimbabwe.

=== Media and distribution ===
In the earlier years of Zimdancehall, it faced excessive resistance from radio stations and recording studios, due to their view of it being difficult to sell, and being a derivative of Jamaican culture. As such, artists had a heavy reliance on independent studios, promoters, and informal networks of media distribution.

The increase in affordable recording technology and internet cafes during the early 2000s was instrumental in expanding the genre's reach. Music was shared through shows, online platforms, CDs, and websites, several of which served only to promote Zimdancehall. Due to its decentralization, there was ease in avoiding traditional roadblocks, growing a dedicated fan base, and continuing to save money.

== Notable artists ==
Artists who have made significant contributions to the development of Zimdancehall include:

- Winky D
- Freeman HKD
- Soul Jah Love
- Killer T
- Tocky Vibes
- Judgement Yard
- Levels Chillspot
- PTK Bodyslam
