= Artur Walther =

German-American art collector

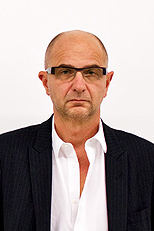
- Born: October 9, 1948 (age 77); Ulm, Germany
- Occupation: Art Collector
- Known for: The Walther Collection

Artur Walther (born October 9, 1948) is a German-American art collector focused on exhibiting and publishing contemporary photography and video art. A graduate of Harvard Business School, Walther was a General Partner at Goldman Sachs until his retirement in 1994. He began collecting photography in the late 1990s and later established The Walther Collection, which is open to the public at its museum campus in Neu-Ulm, Germany and its Project Space in New York City.

== Early life and education ==
Artur Walther was born in 1948 in Ulm, Germany. He graduated from the University of Regensburg in 1975. In 1977 he earned an MBA from Harvard Business School.

== Career ==
Walther worked in the field of international investment banking. He established one of the first groups focused on interest and currency swaps on Wall Street and was a co-founder and co-chairman of the International Swaps and Derivatives Association. In 1983, he became co-head of Goldman Sachs’ worldwide capital markets group and was the founding partner of Goldman Sachs’ operations in Germany.

== Retirement ==
In 1994, at age 46 Walther retired and pursued his interests in architecture, design, and photography. Walther studied at the International Center of Photography and took classes with artists such as Bruce Davidson, Mary Ellen Mark, Joel Meyerowitz, Stephen Shore and also became acquainted with Bernd and Hilla Becher. Fascinated by the practices of typology, taxonomy, and seriality, he began to collect photography. The works of Neue Sachlichkeit (New Objectivity) photographers such as August Sander and Karl Blossfeldt, and the industrial photographs of the Bechers, formed the nucleus of his collection.

Walther joined the Architecture and Design Committee for the Museum of Modern Art, the Photography Committee of the Whitney Museum of American Art, the Photography Committees of Bard and Vassar Colleges, and he became a Board Member of the Storefront for Art and Architecture and the International Center of Photography.

In 2003, as chair of the exhibitions committee at the International Center of Photography, Walther spearheaded the establishment of its Triennial of Photography and Video. Walther has participated in the Art Basel Art Salon series, contributed to Art Basel Magazine and to Mutations: Perspectives on Photography, and organized exhibitions at Paris Photo and Les Rencontres d’Arles, where his nominees for the 2011 Discovery Award, Mikhael Subotzky and Patrick Waterhouse, won the grand prize. In December 2011, Walther was named one of Art+Auction magazine’s “Power 100.”

== The Walther Collection ==
From the early 1990s onward, Walther traveled extensively and expanded the collection to include photography and video art from Asia – specifically China – and Africa, incorporating major works and series by, among others, Ai Weiwei, Zhang Dali, Samuel Fosso, Rotimi Fani-Kayode, David Goldblatt, Seydou Keïta, Santu Mofokeng, J.D. ‘Okhai Ojeikere, Wang Qingsong, Jo Ractliffe, Song Dong, Mikhael Subotzky, Guy Tillim, Malick Sidibé, and Zhang Huan.

In June 2010, Artur Walther opened his collection to the public with the inauguration of The Walther Collection, a four-building museum complex in a residential area of Neu-Ulm/Burlafingen, Germany. Supported by the Walther Family Foundation, The Walther Collection is dedicated to promoting new scholarship through an in-depth exhibition and publication program. The inaugural exhibition, Events of the Self: Portraiture and Social Identity, was organized by Okwui Enwezor and integrated the work of three generations of African photographers with selections of modern and contemporary German photography.

The second annual exhibition, Appropriated Landscapes, was organized by Corinne Diserens. The exhibition opened in June 2011, featuring photography and video exploring the effects of war, migration, energy, architecture, and memory on the landscapes of Southern Africa. The collection's third exhibition on African photography, Distance and Desire: Encounters with the African Archive, opened in June 2013. Curated by Tamar Garb, Distance and Desire brings together late-nineteenth and early-twentieth century photography from Southern and Eastern Africa, set in dialogue with recent photography and video by artists engaging with the archive. Events of the Self, Appropriated Landscapes, and Distance and Desire are accompanied by exhibition catalogues co-published by Steidl.

Walther opened a second exhibition venue, The Walther Collection Project Space, in New York in April 2011. In New York, Walther has presented exhibitions on Jo Ractliffe, August Sander, Seydou Keïta, Rotimi Fani-Kayode, and the three-part exhibition series Distance and Desire: Encounters with the African Archive. With over 1,400 works, the Walther Collection is considered one of the most significant holdings of contemporary Chinese and African photography in the world.

== Publications ==
- Enwezor, Okwui, Contemporary African Photography from the Walther Collection: Events of the Self: Portraiture and Social Identity, Göttingen: Steidl, 2010. ISBN 3-86930-157-0
- Diserens, Corinne, Contemporary African Photography from the Walther Collection: Appropriated Landscapes, Göttingen: Steidl, 2011. ISBN 3-86930-387-5
- Garb, Tamar, African Photography from The Walther Collection: Distance and Desire: Encounters with the African Archive, Göttingen: Steidl, 2013. ISBN 978-3869306513
