= Lebohang Kganye =

South African visual artist

- Born: 1990 (age 35–36); Johannesburg, South Africa
- Education: Diploma University of Johannesburg; Master's Witwatersrand University
- Occupation: Artist
- Years active: 2009–present
- Awards: 2024 Deutsche Börse Photography Foundation Prize, Winner 2022 Foam Paul Huf Award, Winner; 2021/2022 Grand Prix Images Vevey, Winner 2019 Camera Austria Award, Winner
- Website: www.lebohangkganye.co.za

Lebohang Kganye (born 1990) is a South African visual artist living and working in Johannesburg. Kganye is part of a new generation of contemporary South African artists and photographers born shortly before or after Apartheid ended.

== Biography ==
Lebohang Kganye was born in Johannesburg and grew up in Katlehong, a township in South Africa. She started her photography training at the Market Photo Workshop in Johannesburg in 2009, completing its Advanced Photography Programme in 2011. Kganye received her diploma in Fine Arts from the University of Johannesburg in 2016. She is currently working on a Masters in Fine Arts at the Witwatersrand University.

== Career and work ==
Lebohang Kganye lost her mother when she was twenty years old. Her mother was her main connection to her extended family. A few years later, after she had completed her studies at the Market Photo Workshop, Kganye started to explore her family stories by looking into old photo albums and recording oral stories narrated by her family members. Through cross-dressing and performance, Kganye attempts to recreate moments in her family history she had not herself experienced. Her work aims to juxtapose different temporalities and transform photography as a meeting place between generations. Roland Barthes' eulogy to his late mother and reading of photography as overlapping past and present in Camera Lucida inspired Kganye's practice.

The spelling of Kganye's surname is another component of the artist's work. The apartheid regime forced black South African families to move to designated areas away from city centres. Black South African surnames were often recorded incorrectly or misspelt by law officials. The spelling of Kganye's surname changed from Khanye to Khanyi, and eventually, Kganye. As Kganye explains, by revisiting her family journey, she discovered that identity could not be traced: "it is an invention, constructed of true, half-true and untrue narratives, hopes, dreams and fears". Kganye's practice incorporates animated films, installations and large-scale sculpted papers and cut-outs as ways to re-experience the past and question the fabricated nature of history and memory. As the artist explains: "a large part of history and memory is in fact fantasy."

=== Photography ===
Lebohang Kganye's work deploys photography, self-portraiture and archives to engage notions of affiliations, memory and fiction. The artist explores history by creating imaginative sceneries where real and fictional characters coexist.

In B(l)ack to Fairy Tales (2011), created during her studies at the Market Photo Workshop, Kganye stages scenes drawn from The German Grimm Brothers fairy tales and Disney. As the artist writes: "As a girl, I identified with fairy tale characters such as Snow White. Our annual primary school plays were about fairy tales, and I'd say, I'm Snow White and want to be her. My black skin and location became an increasing disjuncture with the fantasies I believed in." Covering her body with black paint and dressed in childhood inspired outfits, she attempts to stress the disjunction between her childhood fantasies and experience growing up in black South African townships.

Kganye was the recipient of The Tierney Fellowship in 2012 and exhibited Her-Story and Heir-Story, two photographic series combined under the overall title "Ke Lefa Laka" ("It's my inheritance," in Sesotho) at the Market Photo Workshop. Working under the mentorship of the visual artist Mary Sibande and curator Nontobeko Ntombela, Kganye explores her family story through re-performance, digital juxtapositions and photocollages. Her-Story, explains Kganye, is a way to "reconnect" with her late mother. Using pictures of her late mother found in old family albums as a reference, Kganye dresses up with her mother's clothes, adopts her mothers' poses and is photographed by her sister in the exact locations displayed in the original snapshots. She then digitally juxtaposes her contemporary images to her mother's. This series of double exposures attempts to annihilate differences between the present and the past . As the artist explains, in Her-Story, she "(her mother) is me, I am her. There remains in this commonality so much difference, and so much distance in space and time. Photographs present us not just with the "thereness" of the object but the "having been there," thus having the ability to present past, present, and future in a single image." Ke Lefa Laka (2013) was awarded the Jury Prize at the Bamako Encounters Biennale of African Photography in 2015 and the Contemporary African Photography (CAP) Prize in 2016.

=== Cuttings ===
Besides the artist's family story, Lebohang Kganye's work explores the political and economic history of South Africa.

In Heir-Story (2013), Kganye unpacks her family's journey of migration during apartheid. As Kganye explains: "The project evolves around how my family landed in Johannesburg – how they ended up in the city from the farmlands. But it's really a relatable story. There are stories of migration from around the world. It's not a foreign story." Heir-Story focuses on Kganye's grandfather. Dressed in his suit, a typical garment in her family photographs, and stepping into his shoes, Kganye places herself in an installation made of large-size cardboard cut-outs of enlarged photos from her old family albums. Kganye never met her grandfather who died before she was born. Heir-Story, the artist writes, allows her to "enact these stories to construct a visual narrative, in which we (her grandfather and herself) meet". In a series of six scenes, Kganye revisits her grandfather's displacement during the apartheid era. He was the first member of the family to move from the farmlands of the Orange Free State to Transvaal. Kganye recorded stories narrated by her family members to help her recreate each scene. As she explains: "I'm reimagining the scenes through what I've been told." Kganye is the only figure shot in colour. She photographs herself interacting with life-size black and white flat-mannequins of the characters related to her in family stories and photo albums, and in doing so, creates a juxtaposition between the present and the past. Heir-Story was exhibited together with the series Her-Story in the exhibition Ke Lefa Laka at the Market Photo Worksop.

Kganye experiments with installation and sculpture. Her grandfather, the central patriarchal figure in her family, is a recurrent character in her creative practice. In Reconstruction of a Family (2016), she borrows archival elements from her photo albums to construct enlarged cardboard cut-outs. She inserts black silhouettes of characters from her family photo albums into a human-scale white box and places her grandfather at the centre of the stage. Reconstruction of a Family focuses on the family story of Kganye's mother, their successive displacements during the apartheid era and their creation of temporary homes across the country. As Kganye explains: "A big difference compared to my previous series on this same process is that the characters here are reversed—the background is white, the silhouettes are black. The characters no longer have faces. They become anonymous." By placing figures from different generations in the same scene, Kganye engages the theme of memory and death.

From 2016-onwards, Lebohang Kganye produces the series titled Dirithi. Using the family album as a primary material, Kganye selects family figures and transforms their photographic representations into anonymous and enigmatic silhouettes. Dirithi, as Kganye explains, evokes the passing of family figures and stresses the capacity of photography to act as a bridge between the dead and the living. According to the artist: "photography is a ghost, an existence in transition, hovering in a duality of time. Silhouettes resonate with me because of this play".

=== Theatrics ===
Lebohang Kganye's practice engages theatre and literature. In her series Tell Tale (2018), she stages the stories of the villagers narrated in Athol Fugard's play Road to Mecca and Lauren Beukes' book Maverick. Placing silhouette cut-outs of characters in miniature theatre sets, Kganye figures her own interpretation of the tales. As she writes: "Tell Tale confronts the conflicting stories, which are told in multiple ways, even by the same person – a combination of memory and fantasy. The work does not attest to being a documentation of a people but presents their personal narratives, which they share over a cup of tea, homemade ginger ale or the locally brewed beer." Tell Tale (2018) presents villagers interacting with ordinary objects, their "prized possessions". In these theatre sets, Kganye attempts to highlight the capacity of oral stories to pass from one generation to the next and "perform ideals of a community".

=== Animation ===
Lebohang Kganye has been working with films, animating the life-size flat-mannequins of characters taken from her family albums with light and shadows. In 2014, Lebohang Kganye turns her series Heir-Story (2013) into the animated film Pied Piper's Voyage. In 2017, she animates her series Reconstruction of a Family (2016) in the film Ke Sale Teng. The medium of film is a way for the artist further to explore the fluctuating character of memory and history. As she explains: "Through the use of silhouette cutouts of family members and other props in a diorama, the film confronts the conflicting stories, which are told in multiple ways, even by the same person." In Pied Piper's Voyage (2014) and Ke Sale Teng (2017), Kganye explores the malleability of oral narratives.

=== Installation ===
Kganye works with a variety of medium and scales, alternating between life-size and monumental installations. The installation Mohlokomedi wa Tora ("lighthouse keeper") in 2018 presents the story of her grandfather in life-size sceneries made of cardboards and cut-outs standing up in the exhibition space. Organising archival elements around a light positioned in the centre of the room, the artist creates a shadow play theatre and invites visitors to walk in and interact with each scene. Kganye uses stories told by her aunt and her grandmother, defined by the artists as "the keepers of light" to create the photographic arrangements. In Mohlokomedi wa Tora, Kganye highlights her matrilineal lineage and the women in her family as keepers of memories. As the artist explains, the work aims to stress the power of oral stories to shape vivid and collective imaginaries.

== Publications ==
- Apartheid and After Publication, Huis Marseille, 2013
- Ke Lefa Laka, Tierney Fellowship Publication, Market Photo Workshop, 2013
- My Joburg Publication, Fage, 2014
- Eyes on, Eyes from Africa, Book on emerging photography, OFF the Wall Editions, 2015
- Telling Time, Bamako Encounters Biennale Publication, Kehrer, 2015
- L'autre Continent Publication, Muséum du Havre, 2016
- ELSE Publication, Musée de l'Elysée Lausanne, 2016
- Recent Histories: Contemporary African Photography and Video Art from the Walther Collection, Steidl / The Walther Collection, 2017
- Sasol New Signatures, Catalogue, 2017
- 35 Years: Trailblazers, Lizamore and Gallery, Catalogue, 2017
- Being a Photographer in Africa, the ten years of Afrique in Visu, Éditions Clémentine de la Féronnière, 2017
- 144/2018 Camera Austria International, Camera Austria, 2018
- Tell Freedom, Kunsthal kAde Amersfoort, 2018
- Objective #20, Objective Press, Oslo, 2019
- The Journey | New Positions in African Photography, Kerber, 2020
- Africa State of Mind: Contemporary Photography Reimagines a Continent, Thames & Hudson, 2020
- Thuis/Home – PAPIER BIËNNALE/PAPER BIENNIAL, 2020
- Unexpected. Le hasard des choses, Festival Images Vevey catalogue, 2020
- The Power of My Hands - Afrique(s) : artistes femmes, Editions Paris Musées, Catalogue, 2020
- Family Affairs. Family in Current Photography, Deichtorhallen Hamburg, Kehrer Verlag, 2021
- Women and Photography in Africa. Creative Practices and Feminist Challenges, Routledge, 2021
- Photography—A Feminist History, Tate and Chronicle Books, 2021
- Pass it On, FOTODOK and METEØRØ EDITIONS, 2021
- LEBOHANG KGANYE. One Picture Book II #26. Ke Lefa Laka - Her Story Volume I, Nazraeli Press, 2021
- LEBOHANG KGANYE. One Picture Book II #27. Ke Lefa Laka - Her Story Volume II, Nazraeli Press, 2021
- As We Rise: Photography from the Black Atlantic, aperture, 2021
- Biennale Arte 2022 — The Milk of Dreams, Volume II Participating countries and the Collateral Events, Biennale Arte, 2022
- Black Matrilineage, Photography, and Representation: Another Way of Knowing, Leuven University Press, 2022
- African Art Now: 50 Pioneers Defining African Art for the Twenty-First Century, Ilex, 2022
- Photography Grant on Industry and Work/ 2023, Foundazione MAST, Idea Books, Catalogue, 2023
- Tell Me What You Remember: Sue Williamson and Lebohang Kganye, Yale University Press, 2023
- The Struggle of Memory – Deutsche Bank Collection, Kerber, 2023
- A World In Common: Contemporary African Photography, Tate Publishing London, 2023
- David Goldblatt: No Ulterior Motive, Yale University Press, 2023
- The Market Photo Workshop in South Africa and the ‘Born Free’ Generation: Remaking Histories, Routledge, 2023
- À partir d’elle. Des artistes et leur mère, Delpire&Co, LE BAL, Catalogue, 2023
- Deutsche Börse Photography Foundation Prize 2024, The Photographers’ Gallery, 2024

== Exhibitions ==
=== Solo exhibitions ===
- Ke Lefa Laka, Market Photo Workshop Gallery, Johannesburg, 2013
- Focus: African Perspectives, Armory Show, Afronova Gallery, New York, 2016
- Festival Africolor, Université Paris 13, Paris, 2016
- Tell Tale, The Photo Workshop Gallery, Johannesburg, 2018
- Mohlokomedi wa Tora, Pretoria Art Museum, Pretoria, South Africa, 2018
- a ppr oc he: Lebohang Kganye, Le Molière, Paris, 2019
- Camera Austria Award for Contemporary Photography, Lebohang Kganye, Award Ceremony, Graz, 2019.
- The Stories We Tell, George Bizos Gallery at Apartheid Museum, Johannesburg, 2020
- What Are You Leaving Behind?, ROSEGALLERY, Santa Monica, USA, 2022
- Leave the light when you leave for good, Georgian House Museum, Bristol, UK, 2022
- Staging Memories, Grand Prix Images Vevey 2021/2022, Musée Jenisch, Vevey, Switzerland, 2022
- Haufi Nyana? I’ve Come to Take you Home, FOAM, Amsterdam, Netherlands, 2023
- Ternary Memories of Yesterday, Galleri Image, Aarhus, Denmark, 2023
- Mmoloki wa mehopolo: Breaking Bread with a Wanderer, Brundyn Arts and Culture, Cape Town, South Africa, 2023
- Shall you Return Everything, but the Burden, Rautenstrauch-Joest Museum, Cologne, Germany, 2023
- Mmoloki wa mehopolo: Breaking Bread with a Wanderer, Boschendal x Brundyn Art, Cape Town, South Africa, 2024
- The Sea is History, outdoor sculptures, Boschendal x Brundyn Art, Cape Town, South Africa, 2024–2025
- The Work of Shadows, Galerie La Patinoire Royale Bach, Brussels, Belgium, 2025
- Le Sale ka Kgotso, Fotografiska Berlin 2025–2026 , Fotografiska Tallinn 2026–2027

=== Group exhibitions ===
- Rememory, William Goodenough House, London, 2012
- Short Change, My Joburg, La Maison Rouge Gallery, Paris, 2013
- Photoville, Brooklyn Bridge Park, New York, 2013
- Apartheid and After, Huis Marseille, Amsterdam, 2013
- OFF THE WALL, Les Rencontres d'Arles, Arles, 2014
- The View From Here, Tiwani Contemporary, London, 2015
- Telling Time, Bamako Encounters Biennale of African Photography, Bamako, 2015
- Cities and Memory, Photo Biennale, Brandts Museum, Odense, 2016
- L'Autre Continent, Artistes, Femmes, Africaines, Le Havre, 2016
- Recent Histories, New Photography from Africa, Walther Collection Project Space, New York, 2016
- In Plain Sight: Social Life in South Africa and Romania before and after 1989, Aparte Gallery of George Enescu University of Arts, Iasi & Borderline Art Space, Lasi, Romania, 2016
- Give me Yesterday, Fondazione Prada Osservatorio, Milan, 2016
- Le jour qui vient, AFRICA NOW, Galerie des Galeries, Galeries Lafayette, Paris, 2017
- Les Territoires du Corps, Video Programme, Art Paris Art Fair, Grand Palais, Paris, 2017
- Recent Histories, New Photography from Africa, Walther Collection, Ulm, 2017
- Digital Africa (Tokyo), YaPhoto@Arakawa Africa, OGU MAG gallery, Tokyo, 2017
- RESIST(E) – Printemps photographique Afrique de Sud, NegPos, France, 2017–2018
- Sans tambour ni trompette – Cent ans de guerres, Le Parvis centre d'art, Parvis, France, 2017–2018
- Tell freedom, by all means necessary, Kunsthal KAdE, Amersfoort, The Netherlands, 2018
- Africa is No Island, MACAAL, Marrakech, 2018 Wayback Machine
- 17th DongGang International Photo Festival 2018, Gangwon-do, Yeongwol-gun, Korea, 2018
- ReCreation, Non-Work: Occupied by Leisure Time, Fotograf Festival #8, Fotograf Gallery, Prague, Czech Republic, 2018
- Not the Usual Suspects, IZIKO South African National Gallery, Cape Town, 2018–2019
- Un Air de famille – parce que les fantômes disparaissent au lever du jour, H2M, Bourg-en-Bresse, France, 2018–2019
- L'Afrique n'est pas une île, Fondation Zinsou, Cotonou, Benin, 2018–2019
- Recent Histories, Contemporary African Photography and Video Art from The Walther Collection, Huis Marseille, Museum for Photography, Amsterdam, NL, 2018–2019
- Gifts, 25 years of Open Society Foundation, Open Society Foundation, Cape Town, 2018–2020
- The Bricks that Build a Home, The Migratie Museum, The Hague, The Netherlands, 2018
- Africa State of Mind, Impressions Gallery, Bradford UK, 2018
- Remembrance, Rose Gallery, Santa Monica, 2018
- Sans Tambour, Ni Trompette, Cent ans de Guerres, Faux Mouvement, Metz, France, 2018–2019
- Who's Looking at the Family, Now?, Photo50 at London Art Fair, London, UK, 2019
- Beyond Boundaries: LensCulture Discoveries in Contemporary Photography, Aperture Gallery, New York, 2019 LensCulture Exhibition at Aperture Gallery
- Coda Paper Art 2019, Coda Paper Museum, Apeldoorn, the Netherlands, 2019
- Africa State of Mind, Museum of the African Diaspora, San Francisco, 2019
- The Way She Looks: A History of Female Gazes in African Portraiture, Ryerson Image Centre, Toronto, 2019
- Africa State of Mind, Royal West of England Academy, Bristol UK, 2019–2020
- Crossing Night: Regional Identities x Global Context, MOCAD, Detroit USA, 2019–2020
- Alpha Crucis – Contemporary African Art, Astrup Fearnley Museet, Oslo, Norway, 2020
- Afterglow, Yokohama Triennale, Yokohama Museum of Art, Japan, 2020 Artist
- BLANKSPACE: Home as a Parish, Hangar Online (digital), 2020
- Unexpected, Festival Images Vevey, Vevey, Switzerland, 2020
- APhF – Athens Photo Festival 2020, Athens, 2020
- Home, Paper Biennale, Museum Rijswijk, Rijswijk, Netherlands, 2020
- Paulo Cunha e Silva Art Prize Exhibition, Porto, Portugal, 2020
- Imagens Resolutivas, FIF_BH – International Festival of Photography of Belo Horizonte, Brazil, 2020
- The Power of My Hands, Traveling Exhibition, Africa 2020 season, Musée d’Art Moderne de Paris, Paris, 2020–2021
- Pass It On. Private Stories, Public Stories, FOTODOK, Utrecht, Netherlands, 2020–2021
- Beyond the Sky, Film exhibition, Toni Rembe Freedom Theater, MoAD, San Francisco, 2021–2022
- Nouvelles icônes, effigies de sel et d’or, FRAC Réunion, Sudel Fuma in Saint-Paul, Reunion Island, 2021–2022
- On the Moon and on the Earth / make way for the dreamers!, Photographia Europea, 16th edition, Reggio Emilia, Italy, 2021
- Family Affairs. Family in Current Photography, Traveling Exhibition, Deichtorhallen Hamburg, Germany, 2021
- Portraits in Dialogue: South African Contemporary Photography, OCT Boxes Art Museum, Foshan City, China, 2021
- Sites of Memory, UTA Artist Space, Los Angeles, USA, 2021
- Into the Light, South African Pavilion, 59th Venice Biennale, 2022
- As We Rise: Photography from The Black Atlantic, Traveling Exhibition, The Art Museum at the University of Toronto, 2022
- The Power of My Hands – Afrique(s) artises femmes, Travelling exhibition, SOMETHING Art Space, Abidjan, Côte d’Ivoire, 2022
- The Breath of Ancestors, Congo Biennale, Kinshasa, Congo 2022
- Currency: Photography Beyond Capture, Triennial of Photography Hamburg, Deichtorhallen Hamburg, Germany, 2022
- Botho Art Collective LA – SA, Los Angeles CA, 2022
- Shifting Dialogues, K21 Kunstsammlung, Düsseldorf, Germany, 2022
- OZANGÉ, Bienal de Fotografía Africana, Malaga, Spain, 2022–2023
- Words Create Images, 5th International Biennale of Casablanca, Morocco, 2022–2023
- Family Affairs. Family in Current Photography, Traveling Exhibition, Kunsthalle Erfurt, Germany, 2022–2023
- Motherhood, Syker Vorwerk Contemporary Art Center, Bremen, Germany, 2022–2023
- Foggy Island, Modern Art Museum, Shanghai, China, 2023
- Memory is the Seamstress, Green Art Gallery, Dubai, UAE, 2023
- Rooms with a View. Aby Warburg, Florence and the Laboratory of Images, Uffizi Galleries, Florence, 2023
- Insistent Presence: Contemporary African Art from the Chazen Collection, Chazen Museum of Art, Madison, USA, 2023
- Trace — Formations of Likeness, Haus der Kunst, Munich, Germany, 2023
- The Struggle of Memory – Deutsche Bank Collection, Palais Populaire, Berlin, 2023 Wayback Machine
- Book_Spaces, Museum für Photographie Braunschweig, Germany, 2023
- Tell Me What You Remember: Sue Williamson and Lebohang Kganye, Barnes Foundation, Philadelphia, USA, 2023
- As We Rise: Photography from The Black Atlantic, Traveling Exhibition, The Polygon Gallery, Vancouver, Canada, 2023 / Peabody Essex Museum, Salem, USA, 2023 As We Rise: Photography From The Black Atlantic
- The Power of My Hands, Traveling Exhibition, Museu Nacional de História Natural, Luanda, Angola, 2023
- MAST Photography Grant 2023, Fondazione MAST, Bologna, Italy, 2023
- I Miss Myself The Most, Stevenson Gallery, Johannesburg, South Africa, 2023–2024
- New acquisitions by the Photography Committee, MAM Paris, France, 2023–2024
- David Goldblatt: No Ulterior Motive, Traveling Exhibition, Art Institute of Chicago, USA, 2023–2024
- À partir d’elle, des artistes en leur mère, Le BAL, Paris, 2023–2024
- I Am Not What You See Of Me, La Fondation Francès, Clichy, France, 2023–2024
- Mickalene Thomas / Portrait of an Unlikely Space, Yale University Art Gallery, USA, 2023–2024
- Dancing in the Light, The Wedge Collection, MOCA Toronto, 2023–2024
- A World in Common: Contemporary African Photography, Traveling Exhibition, Tate Modern, London, 2023–2024
- David Goldblatt: No Ulterior Motive, Traveling Exhibition, Fundación MAPFRE, Madrid, Spain, 2024
- As We Rise: Photography from The Black Atlantic, Traveling Exhibition, Dalhousie Gallerie, Halifax, Canada, 2024
- A World in Common: Contemporary African Photography, Traveling Exhibition, Wereld Museum, Rotterdam, Netherlands, 2024
- 20 Years of the Verbund Collection, Albertina Museum, Vienna, Austria, 2024
- Deutsche Börse Photography Foundation Prize, Traveling Exhibition, The Cube, Frankfurt, Germany, 2024 / Photographers’ Gallery, London, UK, 2024
- EXPOSED, Torino Foto Festival, Torino, Italy, 2024
- ECHOES: Emotions, Identity, Memory, Ray Triennial of Photography, Deutsche Börse Photography Foundation, Frankfurt, Germany, 2024
- Burning Down the House: Rethinking Family, Kunstmuseum St.Gallen, Switzerland, 2024
- Photography Now, Victoria and Albert Museum, London, UK, 2024–2025
- Grow It, Show It: Hair from Diane Arbus to TikTok, Museum Folkwang Essen, Germany, 2024–2025
- Look at US: 25 Years of Art Collection Deutsche Börse, The Cube, Deutsche Börse AG, Eschborn, Germany, 2024–2025
- As We Rise: Photography from The Black Atlantic, Traveling Exhibition, Saatchi Gallery, London, UK, 2024–2025
- À partir d’elle, des artistes el leur mère, Traveling Exhibition, Foundation A, Brussels, Belgium, 2025
- She who starts the song…, Gjon Mili International Exhibition, National Gallery of Kosovo, Pristina, Kosovo, 2025
- A World in Common: Contemporary African Photography, Traveling Exhibition, C/O Berlin, Germany, 2025
- BA’ZINZILE: A Rehearsal for Breathing, Stellenbosch Triennale, Cape Town, South Africa, 2025
- David Goldblatt: No Ulterior Motive, Traveling Exhibition, Yale University Art Gallery, New Heaven, USA, 2025
- MAMA: From Mary to Merkel, Kunstpalast, Düsseldorf, Germany, 2025
- Motherhood: Paradox and Duality, Iziko South African National Gallery, 2025–2026
- O Poder de Minhas Mãos, Traveling Exhibition, São Paulo, Brazil, 2025–2026
- Ecology of Sensitivity: Guangzhou Image Triennial 2025, Guangdong Museum of Art, Guangzhou, China, 2025
- New Photography 2025: Lines of Belonging, MoMA, New York, USA, 2025–2026

== Awards ==
- SA Taxi Foundation Art Award, Top 5, Multiples, Lizamore and Gallery, 2017
- Contemporary African Photography (CAP) Prize Recipient, Image Afrique Festival, 2017
- Sasol New Signatures Award, Winner, 2017
- Art Photography Awards 2018, LensCulture, Juror's Pick, 2018 WINNERS—Art Photography Awards 2018
- Tokyo International Photography Competition 6th edition, Winner, 2019
- Camera Austria Award, Winner, 2019
- Rolex Mentor and Protégé Arts Initiative, Visual Arts Finalist, 2020
- Shpilman International Prize for Excellence in Photography, Finalist, Honorable Mention, 2020
- Paulo Cunha e Silva Art Prize, Recipient, 2019/2020
- Grand Prix Images Vevey, Winner, 2021/2022
- Foam Paul Huf Award, Winner, 2022
- MAST Photography Grant, Finalist, Special Mention, 2023MAST Photography Grant on Industry and Work / 2023 – Lebohang Kganye
- Deutsche Börse Photography Foundation Prize, Winner, from the Deutsche Börse Photography Foundation and the Photographers' Gallery, 2024

== Collections ==
Kganye's work is held in the following permanent collections:

- Art Collection Deutsche Börse, Eschborn, Germany
- Art Institute of Chicago, Chicago, USA
- Chazen Museum of Art, Wisconsin: 2 prints (as of 23 May 2023)
- Carnegie Museum of Art, Pennsylvania
- Collection du Centre National des Artes Plastiques, Paris, France
- Fondation Francès, Senlis, France
- Frac Réunion, Reúnion, France
- Harry David Art Collection, Athens, Greece
- Jean Pigozzi Collection of African Art, Geneva, Switzerland
- JP Getty Museum Collection, Los Angeles, USA
- JP Morgan, Chase Art Collection, New York, USA
- Museum of Fine Arts, Houston, USA
- Museum of Modern Art, Paris, France
- Rautenstrauch-Joest Museum, Cologne, Germany
- Saastamoinen Foundation Collection, Espoo, Finland
- Smithsonian National Museum of African Art, Washington, USA
- Verbund Collection, Vienna, Austria
- Victoria & Albert Museum, London, UK
- Walther Collection, New York: 24 prints (as of 23 May 2023)
- Wedge Collection, Toronto, Canada
