= Theophelus Rikhotso =

South African visual artist (born 1990)

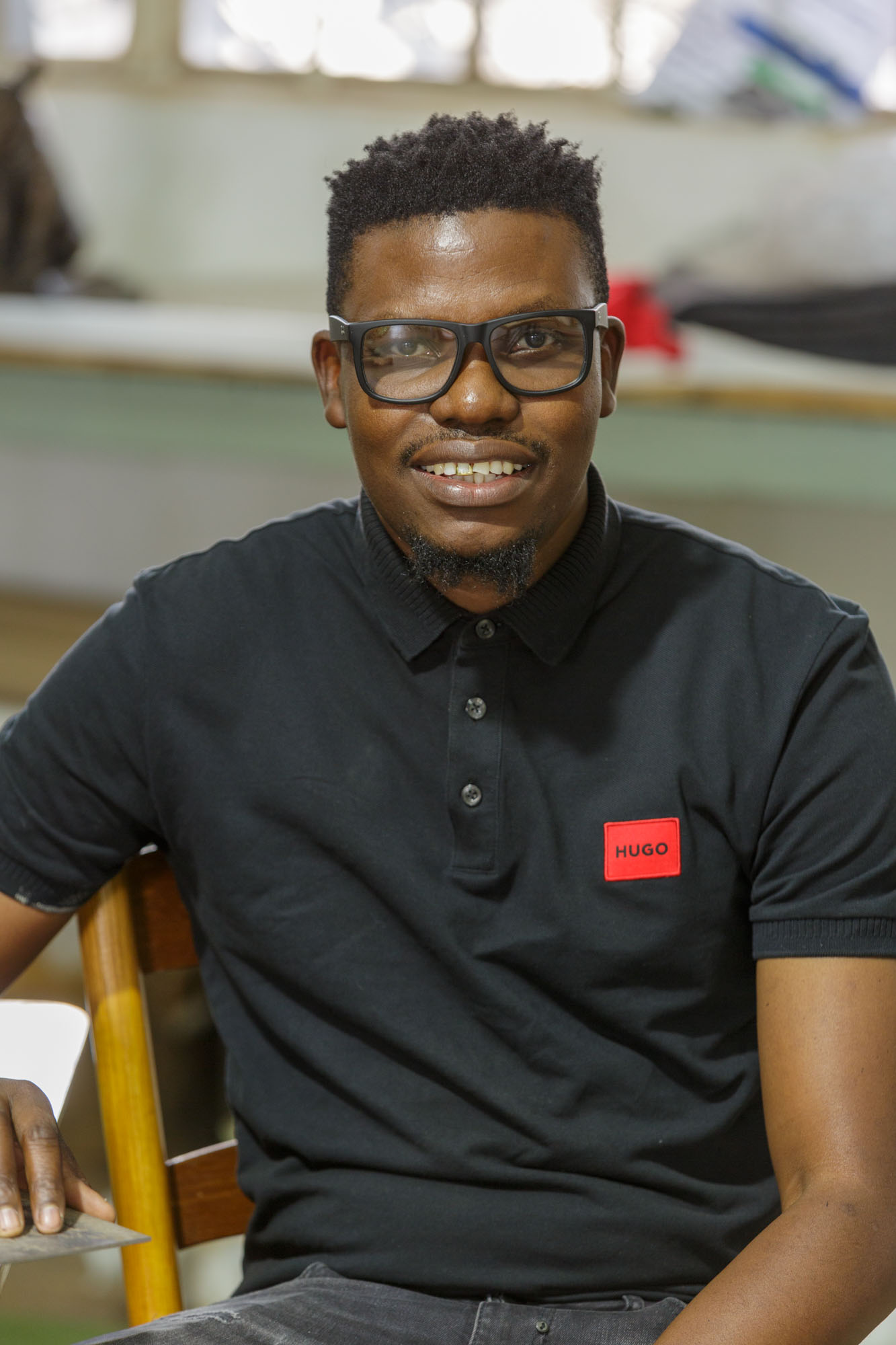
- Born: 1 May 1990 (age 35); Bungeni (Njhakanjhaka), Limpopo, South Africa
- Education: Tshwane University of Technology
- Known for: Visual art, sculpture, mixed media
- Notable work: African Pied Crow on a Shovel
- Movement: Contemporary South African art
- Awards: Finalist, StateoftheART Gallery Award (2021)

Theophelus Rikhotso (born in 1990) is a South African visual artist known for his sculptural, mixed-media, and installation works exploring identity, land, heritage, and sociopolitical narratives in contemporary South Africa. His practice blends traditional rural influences from Limpopo with modern commentary on culture and the environment.

== Early life and education ==
Rikhotso was born in 1990 in Bungeni (Njhakanjhaka), Limpopo, South Africa. He developed an interest in art at the age of eight, inspired by his uncle, a self-taught artist.

He studied Fine and Applied Arts at the Tshwane University of Technology (TUT), where he completed a B-Tech degree in Sculpture.

== Career ==
Rikhotso is based in Pretoria, Gauteng, and works across sculpture, painting, and drawing. His art investigates the intersections of personal memory, ancestral connection, and the socio-economic conditions of post-apartheid South Africa. A recurring motif in his work is the shovel, which he uses as a symbol of labor, resilience, and strength. Another personal emblem is the African pied crow, known in Xitsonga as vukuvuku, representing spirituality and guidance.

His approach often combines industrial and organic materials, including steel, charcoal, canvas, and found objects. In his 2021 work African Pied Crow on a Shovel, he melted a hard hat onto a ready-made shovel as a commentary on labor and identity. Rikhotso has been featured in several exhibitions across South Africa, including solo and group presentations at The Viewing Room Art Gallery, Pretoria Art Museum, WORLDART Gallery in Cape Town as well as Vrede Art Gallery and others. He has exhibited with artists such as Bongiwe Dlomo-Mautloa, Jeanette Unite, Bongi Dube, and Jeff Allan at the Turbine Art Fair in Johannesburg in 2023.

== Artistic style and themes ==
Rikhotso’s work explores the tension between the modern and the ancestral, drawing from his upbringing in a rural landscape. His sculptures and drawings often include bird forms, tools, and abstracted human shapes to address broader questions of land, identity, and spirituality. He describes his process as “listening to the land,” translating lived experience into visual narratives that challenge social taboos and colonial frameworks of representation.

== Exhibitions ==
=== Selected exhibitions ===
- CROSSROADS: Tsela tse pedi, The Viewing Room Art Gallery, Pretoria (2024)
- Echoes of Place, The Viewing Room Art Gallery, Pretoria (2024)
- Ancient the Modern, WORLDART Gallery & Blessing Ngobeni Art Prize Foundation, Cape Town (2025)
- Young and Vital Artists, Pretoria Art Museum (2023)
- StateoftheART Gallery Award Finalists, StateoftheART Gallery, Cape Town (2021)

== Awards and recognition ==
- Finalist, StateoftheART Gallery Award (2021), for his work engaging with the theme of climate change.
- Featured in Wanted Online’s “Young and Vital Artists” (2023).

== Collections ==
Rikhotso’s works are held in private collections in South Africa and have been featured by Strauss & Co., one of the country’s leading fine art auction houses.

== Personal life ==
Rikhotso lives and works in Pretoria. He credits his rural upbringing for his close observation of nature, especially birds and the landscape, which continues to inform his artmaking.
