= Walther Collection =

Public visual art collection

The Walther Collection
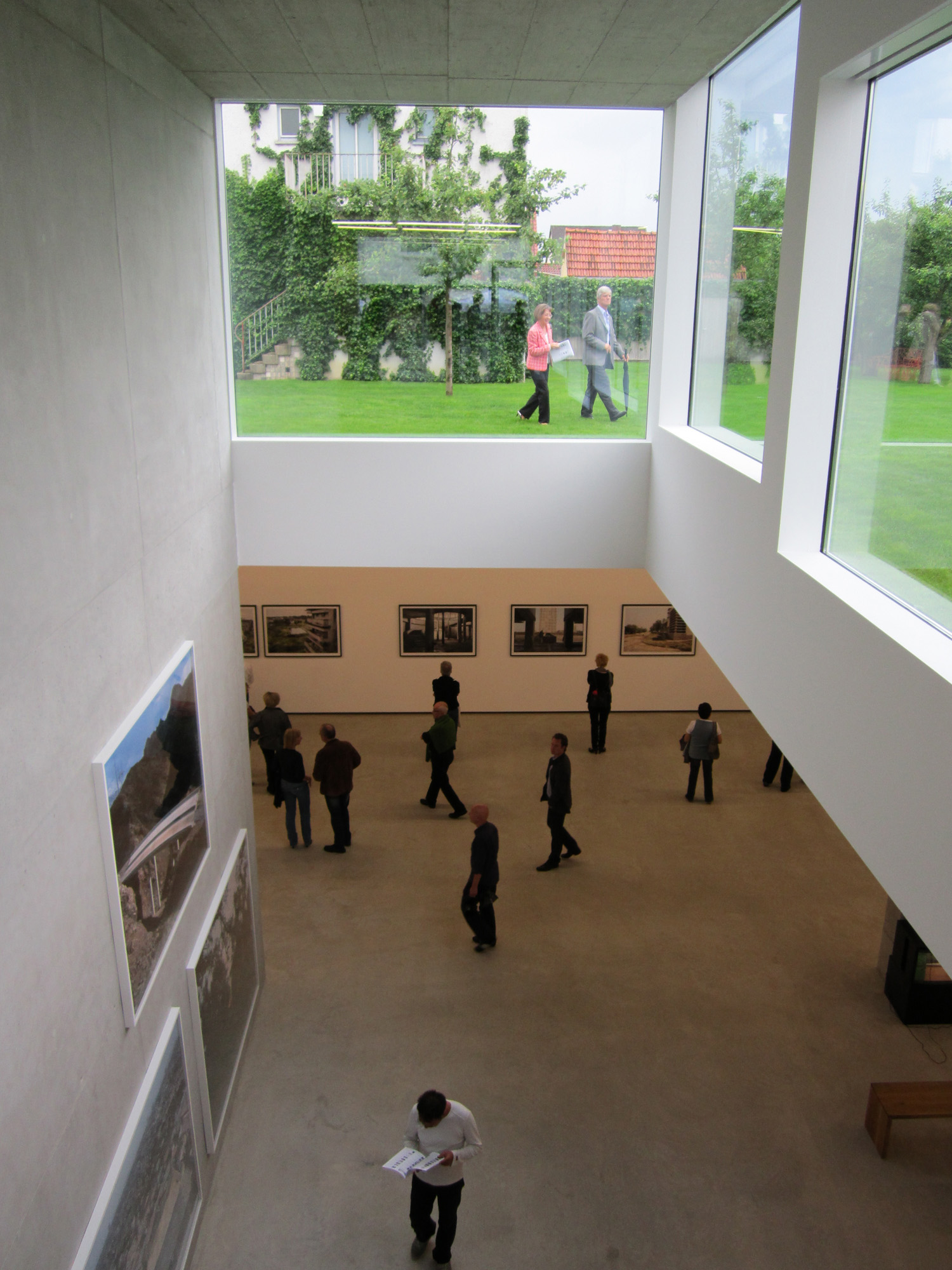
- Established: June 2010
- Location: Reichenauerstrasse 21; Neu-Ulm/Burlafingen, Germany
- Website: walthercollection.com

The Walther Collection is a private non-profit organization dedicated to researching, collecting, exhibiting, and publishing modern and contemporary photography and video art. The collection has two exhibition spaces: the Walther Collection in Neu-Ulm/Burlafingen, in Germany, and the Walther Collection Project Space in New York City.

== Background and architecture ==
Established by German-American art collector Artur Walther, the Walther Collection opened in June 2010 in Neu-Ulm/Burlafingen, Germany. The Walther Collection Project Space opened in New York City in April 2011. The Walther Collection incorporates works across regions, periods, and artistic sensibilities, particularly those by artists and photographers working in Asia and Africa.

The Walther Collection's main exhibition venue is a four-building museum compound in Neu Ulm/Burlafingen, Germany. The principal buildings – the White Box, Green House, and Black House – provide gallery space for the annual exhibition program. A fourth building on the campus accommodates administrative offices and a library. Designed by the Ulm-based architectural firm Braunger Wörtz, the White Box is a light-filled, three-story minimalist structure that houses the Walther Collection's main galleries, and hosts thematic exhibitions and commissioned projects. The Green House, a former residential home, is used for small-format works. The Black House, a bungalow-style structure, presents serial, performance, and conceptual-style photography.

== Exhibitions ==
The Walther Collection's inaugural exhibition, Events of the Self: Portraiture and Social Identity, opened in June 2010. Curated by Okwui Enwezor, the exhibition integrated the work of three generations of African artists and photographers with selections of modern and contemporary German photography. Events of the Self featured works by Sammy Baloji, Yto Barrada, Bernd and Hilla Becher, Candice Breitz, Allan deSouza, Rotimi Fani-Kayode, Samuel Fosso, David Goldblatt, Romuald Hazoumé, Pieter Hugo, Seydou Keïta, Santu Mofokeng, Zwelethu Mthethwa, Zanele Muholi, Ingrid Mwangi, Jo Ratcliffe, August Sander, Berni Searle, Malick Sidibé, Mikhael Subotzky, and Guy Tillim. Chris Dercon, director of Tate Modern, chose Events of the Self as one of the 10 best exhibitions of 2010 for Artforum magazine. Highlights from Events of the Self appeared in Paris Photo 2011.

The second annual exhibition of the Walther Collection, Appropriated Landscapes, opened on June 16, 2011. Curated by Corinne Diserens, Appropriated Landscapes brought together photography and video exploring the effects of war, migration, energy, architecture, and memory on the landscapes of Southern Africa, featuring works by Mitch Epstein, David Goldblatt, Zanele Muholi, Jo Ratcliffe, Penny Siopis, Patrick Waterhouse, Mikhael Subotzky and Guy Tillim.

The third exhibition of the Walther Collection's multi-year investigation of African photography, Distance and Desire: Encounters with the African Archive, opened on June 8, 2013. Distance and Desire, curated by Tamar Garb, was the first major exhibition to address the dialogue between ethnographic visions of late-nineteenth and early-twentieth century African photography and engagements with the archive by contemporary African artists. The exhibition included portraits, figure studies, cartes de visite, postcards, books, and album pages from southern and eastern Africa, featuring images made from the 1860s to 1940s by A. M. Duggan-Cronin and numerous unidentified and unknown photographers. The historical works were presented together with photography, video, and archive projects by contemporary artists including Carrie Mae Weems, Santu Mofokeng, Sue Williamson, Sammy Baloji, Guy Tillim, David Goldblatt, Zwelethu Mthethwa, Zanele Muholi, and Jo Ratcliffe. Distance and Desire was the culmination of this three-part exhibition series in 2011 and 2012 at the Walther Collection Project Space and the international symposium Encounters with the African Archive, which took place in November 2012 at New York University.

In May 2015, The Walther Collection opened The Order of Things: Photography from The Walther Collection. The exhibition, organized by Brian Wallis, examined how the formal tools of classification, particularly archives, typologies, and time-based series, have opened critical challenges to the synthetic conventions of photographic realism. (A previous version was presented at Les Rencontres d'Arles in Arles, France, from July–September 2014.) The Order of Things included photographs and installations by Karl Blossfeldt, Bernd and Hilla Becher, J. D. 'Okhai Ojeikere, August Sander, Richard Avedon, Stephen Shore, Samuel Fosso, Guy Tillim, Zanele Muholi, Ai Weiwei, Zhang Huan, Song Dong, Thomas Ruff, Thomas Struth, Ed Ruscha, Dieter Appelt, Eadweard Muybridge, Kohei Yoshiyuki, and Nobuyoshi Araki.

== New York Project Space ==
The Walther Collection Project Space, in the West Chelsea Arts Building in New York City, extends the collection's mission and program to American audiences.

The space opened to the public on April 15, 2011 with an exhibition of Jo Ratcliffe's portfolio of platinum prints from the series As Terras do Fim do Mundo (The Lands of the End of the World).

The second exhibition at the Project Space was August Sander and Seydou Keïta: Portraiture and Social Identity,

It exhibited Rotimi Fani-Kayode: Nothing to Lose, the first solo exhibition in New York of Fani-Kayode's photographs.

The Walther Collection presented the three-part exhibition series Distance and Desire: Encounters with the African Archive at the Project Space New York from September 2012 to May 2013.

Gulu Real Art Studio, an exhibition of ID photographs collected in Uganda by Martina Bacigalupo, was presented from September 2013 to February 2014.

Christine Meisner's Disquieting Nature, a video installation exploring the geographies in the Mississippi Delta region where blues music originates, was presented from February 28 to June 14, 2014.

A mid-career survey of self-portraiture by Samuel Fosso was exhibited from September 11, 2014 to January 17, 2015. The collection presented Santu Mofokeng: A Metaphorical Biography from January 29 to June 27, 2015.
