= Jo Ractliffe =

South African photographer and video artist

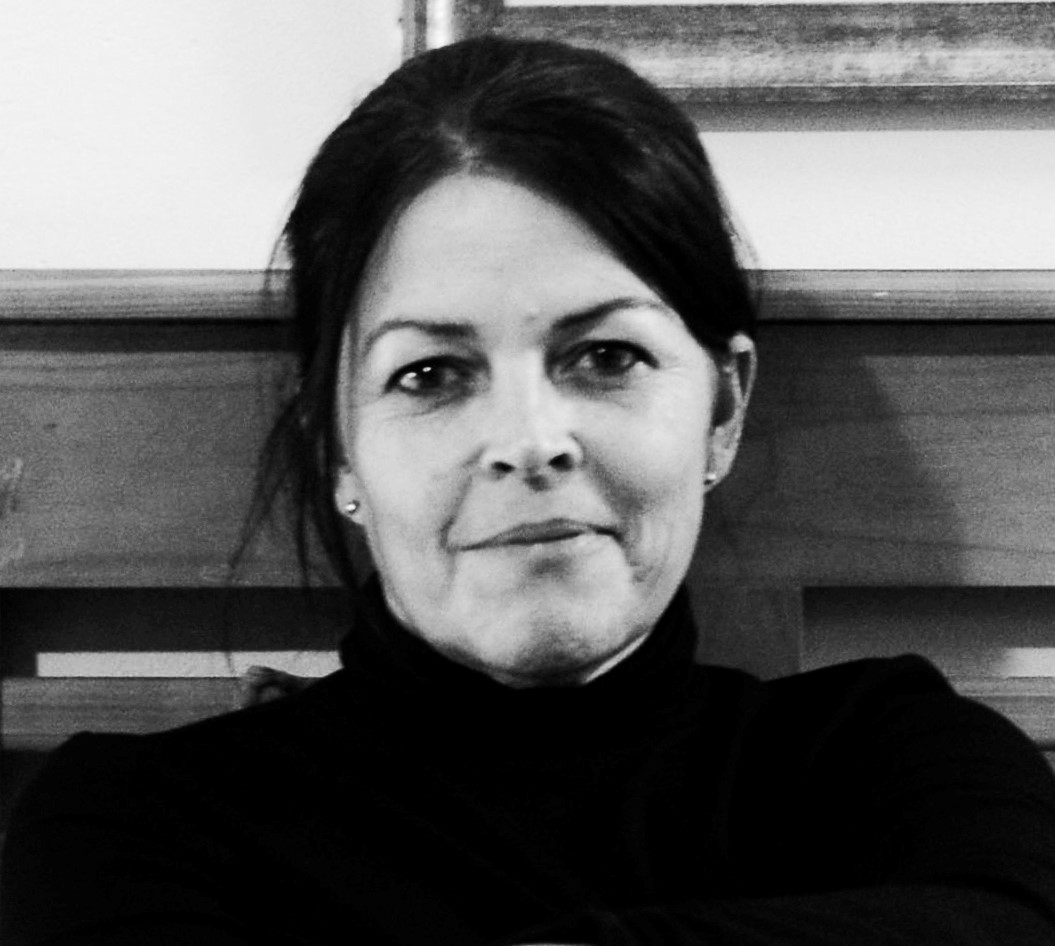
- Ractliffe in 2019
- Born: 9 March 1961 (age 65); Cape Town, South Africa
- Education: BA and MFA at Michaelis School of Fine Art
- Occupation: Photographer
- Notable work: As Terras do Fim do Mundo

Jo Ractliffe (born 9 March 1961) is a South African photographer and teacher working in both Cape Town, where she was born, and Johannesburg, South Africa. She is the oldest of six sisters born to artist Barbara Fairhead and business leader Jeremy Ractliffe.

Ractliffe is considered among the most influential South African "social photographers."

== Career ==
She pursued her education in Cape Town, including her Diploma in Fine Art at Ruth Prowse School of Art, Woodstock, her Bachelor of Fine Arts (1985) and her Master of Fine Arts (1988) at the Michaelis School of Fine Art at the University of Cape Town.

Starting from her first show, the Master of Fine Arts Graduate Show at the Irma Stern Museum, Ractliffe's photography has gained international attention with shows in South Africa, at the MET, MOMA, Tate Modern, and the Gwangju Biennial in South Korea. Okwui Enwezor has described Ractliffe as “one of the most accomplished and under-rated photographers of her generation.” Ractliffe's works have been exhibited independently and with other notable artists such as David Goldblatt, Guy Tillim, William Kentridge, Pieter Hugo, and Zanele Muholi.

She has received numerous awards. Her photobook As Terras do Fim do Mundo was awarded "Best Photobook of 2010" at the International Photobook Festival in Kassel and she was nominated for the Discovery Prize at the Rencontres d'Arles Photography Festival in 2011.

She has held the Writing Fellowship at the Wits Institute for Social and Economic Research in 2010; the Ampersand Foundation fellowship in New York in 2008; the Christian Merian Stiftung fellowship at iaab studios, Basel, Switzerland, in 2001; and the Ecole Cantonale d'Art du Vallais fellowship in Sierre, Switzerland in 2001.

She has had public or curatorial projects, including Johannesburg Circa Now, Johannesburg Art Gallery, South Africa in 2004; Joubert Park Project, Johannesburg, South Africa in 2000, and End of Time Pinhole Photography Project, Nieu-Bethesda, Great Karoo, South Africa in 1999; and Truth Veils, Centre for the Study of Violence and Reconciliation; the Wits History Workshop, University of Witwatersrand, Johannesburg, South Africa.

Ractliffe is also a senior lecturer at the Witwatersrand School of Arts at Wits University, Johannesburg. She has also taught at the Salzburg International Summer Academy of Fine Arts in Salzburg, Austria, and at the Market Photo Workshop in Johannesburg.

== Art themes ==
Ractliffe's photography spans many subjects, but focuses on exploring a specific subject (such as her collection of unpublished images spanning about 25 years: Everything is Everything) or complex landscapes (such as her collection The Borderlands). According to the Metropolitan Museum of Art, Ractliffe “has directed her camera toward landscapes to address themes of displacement, conflict, history, memory, and erasure.” Ractliffe has been described as "a documentary photographer who captures the traces of violence, displacement and struggle in a landscape." Her images evoke memory, history, and the aftermath of conflict. Her work engages with the remnants of conflict, visible as scars in the landscape.

== Art practice ==
Ractliffe uses a wide range of photographic and art practices, including snapshot, documentary, forensic and studio photography, as well as installation video and projections. However, her main medium is the analog black and white image, "which captures a reality bordering on the mysterious, which the artist emphasizes in her printing techniques." In conversation with Kathleen MacQueen for BOMB Magazine, Ractliffe defined her photography practice as “very much about seeing--and being critical and self-reflexive about what such seeing means.” According to her artist's statement Ractliffe is interested in exploring “things that are ephemeral - desire, loss, longing - and their relationship to photography. I am also curious about what we don't expect from photographs, what they leave out, their silence and the spaces they occupy between 'reality' and 'desire'. I try to work in an area between the things we know and things we don't know; what sits outside the frame. I am interested in exploring these oblique and furtive 'spaces of betweenness', and in how they figure in producing meaning in a mode of representation that seems so often predicated on specificity and transparency.”

== Works ==
Her 2009/2010 book of photography As Terras do Fim do Mundo (Portuguese for "The Lands of the End of the World"), also known as "The Aftermath of Conflict" or "The Ghosts of Angola's Civil War," is a collection of black and white film photographs that capture the lingering end of Angola's Civil War. It includes fifty-five photographs, sometimes sixty when printed with earlier works such as Terreno Occupado, which traced the routes of the Border War fought by South Africa in Angola through the 1970s and 80s. Following Terreno Ocupado, which focused on Luanda five years after the country's civil war ended, As Terras do Fim do Mundo "shifts attention away from the urban manifestation of aftermath to the space of war itself. Ractliffe's black and white photographs explore the idea of landscape as pathology, how past violence manifests in the landscape of the present."

According to a review by the Collector Daily, "Ractliffe’s photographs have a silent emptiness to them, where the rocky desert and scrub forest stand mute in the face of history. Her pictures document mass graves, minefields, abandoned crops, ambush sites, improvised memorials, trench systems, and dusty battlefields, singling out some small marker or piece of evidence in the otherwise indifferent landscape. Her platinum prints further soften the harshness of the environment, their tonalities more gentle and forgiving; stands of swaying long grass hide a minefield, pockmarked murals lurk in quiet buildings, or lines of white stones call out the edges of a missile bunker." The most published photo of the collection depicts seven pairs of black and blue overalls hanging from a tree, which the Metropolitan Museum of Art chose to represent Ractliffe's solo show in 2015. Ractliffe comments on the photo in a personal essay for The Guardian, “They are the hollow men.” In a review by The New York Times, "It’s through this historical lens that Ms. Ractliffe views landscape: as morally neutral terrain rendered uninhabitable by terrible facts from the past — the grave of hundreds of Namibia refugees, most of them children, killed in an air raid; the unknown numbers of landmines buried in Angola’s soil. Some are now decades old but can still detonate, so the killing goes on." In conversation around As Terras do Fim do Mundo, Ractliffe has been quoted to say, “One of the reasons for embarking on this project was, in some way, to attempt to locate the imaginary of [The Angolan War], to engage the myths that circulate and to retrieve a place for memory… I’ve spoken a bit about this collision of past and present in the landscape, but it was also colliding in me.”

== Coverage ==
Ractliffe's works have been discussed in many publications, from her own photography collections, such as her book As Terras do Fim do Mundo: The Lands of the End of the World , to group collections, such as Okwui Enwezor's book of over 250 photographs by 30 African artists: Snap Judgments: New Positions in Contemporary African Photography. Her works have been catalogued both as works of art and works of history, as in Okwui Enwezor and Rory Bester's book Rise and Fall of Apartheid: Photography and the Bureaucracy of Everyday Life. This book features "some of the most iconic images of our time" and a "unique combination of photojournalism and commentary [that] offers a probing and comprehensive exploration of the birth, evolution, and demise of apartheid in South Africa. Photographers played an important role in the documentation of apartheid, capturing the system's penetration of even the most mundane aspects of life in South Africa."

In a New Yorker preview and review of Ractliffe's exhibit The Aftermath of Conflict," her body of work is described as having “an odd charge nonetheless, as if the South African photographer had channelled some collective memory. Most of the sites Ractliffe selects are desolate (a field of weeds, a capsized boat, a graveyard), and the resulting pictures can sometimes feel puzzling. But the pain and trauma are palpable, as are Ractliffe’s rigor and restraint: fallow farmlands are riddled with land mines; trash spills down a ravine and into a slum; clothes hang from a dead thorn tree.” The online journal Don't Take Pictures remarked that Ractliffe's images "demonstrate that Ractliffe understands that the impact of war is to be found not only in people and the sometimes desperate places they inhabit, but also in rituals of living that, when divorced from circumstance, assume a kind of stark beauty and haunting memory of what life requires to persist or even thrive. With the photographer’s camera focused tightly on imagery which is often trimmed of context, we are confronted with the unsettling truth that war, in its awful beauty, ravages not just distant lands, but lives closer to home as well."

Her exhibit Vlakplaas (Happenings in Afikaans) is a name alluding to the anti-insurgency government and police agency that acted as an execution site for opponents of apartheid. Vlakplaas was located on a farm near Pretoria. Ractliffe states that the body of work “was commissioned for Truth Veils, an exhibition mounted at the Gertrude Posel Gallery in 1999 to accompany the conference The TRC: Commissioning the Past at the University of the Witwatersrand. It was presented in relation to Prime Evil, a documentary film about Vlakplaas commander Eugene de Kock.” The conference, and Ractliffe's show, were designed in response to South Africa's Truth and Reconciliation Commission and the lasting legacy of apartheid.

Things Fall Apart was a group exhibition that took its title from Chinua Achebe's novel Things Fall Apart. "Seen by many as the archetypal modern African novel in English, the book reflects on the devastating impact of colonialism in Africa. The exhibition uses this association to focus on a similar loss of utopian perspective following the end of the Cold War and collapse of the Communist Bloc’s investment in African cultural and political development. Things Fall Apart presents fifteen contemporary artists’ projects linked to this theme in different ways."

Figures and Fictions was a group show that exhibited the work of seventeen photographers. The hosting museum said of the exhibit: "The excitement and urgency surrounding photography in South Africa today is partly explained by its local context: embedded in colonial history, ethnography, anthropology, journalism and political activism, the best photography emerging from the country has absorbed and grappled with its weighty history, questioning, manipulating and revivifying its visual codes and blending them with contemporary concerns. Post-Apartheid, complex and fundamental issues - race, society, gender, identity - remain very much on the surface. This is reflected by image makers who harness the resulting scenes as a form of creative tension within their personal vision. Here, distinctive photographic voices have emerged: local in character and subject matter, but of wider international interest because of their combined intensity."

Impressions from South Africa was an exhibit at New York's Museum of Modern Art that showcased South African art from the height of apartheid in 1965 onwards. "From the earliest print in the exhibition, made in 1965 (the Museum’s first acquisition of work by a South African artist), to printed posters from the height of the anti-apartheid movement in the 1980s, to projects by a younger generation that reflect new and evolving artistic concerns, these works are striking examples of printed art as a tool for social and artistic expression."

== Exhibits ==
=== Solo exhibitions ===
Title	Location	Date
Both, And,	STEVENSON Gallery Cape Town, South Africa	5 July - 21 August 2018
Jo Ractliffe: Everything is Everything	STEVENSON Gallery Johannesburg, South Africa	18 May - 30 June 2017
The Aftermath of Conflict: Jo Ractliffe's Photographs of Angola and South Africa	The MET Fifth Avenue, New York, USA	24 August 2015 - 6 March 2016
After War	Fondation A Stichting, Brussels, Belgium	2015
Someone Else's Country	Peabody Essex Museum, Salem, Massachusetts, USA	2014
As Terras do Fim Mundo	Museet for Fotokunst, Odense, Denmark	2013
Jo Ractliffe: The Borderlands	STEVENSON Gallery, Johannesburg, South Africa	25 July - 31 August 2013
The Loom of the Land	STEVENSON Gallery, Johannesburg, South Africa	24 January - 8 March 2013
As Terras do Fim Mundo	Fotohof, Salzburg, Austria	2012
Trade Routes Over Time,	STEVENSON Gallery Cape Town, South Africa	4 April - 19 May 2012
As Terras do Fim Mundo	Walther Collection Project Space, New York, USA	2011
Jo Ractliffe: As Terras do Fim do Mundo	Brodie and STEVENSON Gallery, Johannesburg, South Africa	24 February - 2 April 2011
FOREX: THIS IS OUR TIME	Brodie and STEVENSON Gallery, Johannesburg, South Africa,	10 June - 24 July 2010
Terren Ocupado	Warren Siebrits Modern and Contemporary Art, Johannesburg, South Africa	2008
Jo Ractliffe: Selected Colour Works 1999-2005	Warren Siebrits Modern and Contemporary Art, Johannesburg, South Africa	2005
Jo Ractliffe: Selected Works 1982-1999	Warren Siebrits Modern and Contemporary Art, Johannesburg, South Africa	2004
Snow White	Ecole Cantonale du'Art du Vallais, Sierra, Switzerland	2000
End of Time	Ibis Art Gallery, Nieu-Bethesda, traveling to the Mark Coetzee Art Cabinet, Cape Town, South Africa	1999
Jo Ractliffe: Vlakplaas	Gertrude Posel Gallery; STEVENSON Gallery Johannesburg, South Africa	1999
Guess who loves you	Goodman Gallery, Johannesburg, South Africa	1997
Jo Ractliffe: End of Time	STEVENSON Gallery Johannesburg, South Africa	1996-1999
Jo Ractliffe: reShooting Diana	STEVENSON Gallery Johannesburg, South Africa	1990-1995
Nadir	Metropolitan Life Gallery, Cape Town, South Africa	1989
Master of Fine Arts Graduate Show	Irma Stern Museum, Cape Town, South Africa	1988

=== Recent group exhibitions ===
Title	Location	Date
Both, And,	STEVENSON Gallery, Cape Town, South Africa	5 July - 21 August 2018
More for Less	A4 Arts Foundation, Cape Town, South Africa	2018
A Short History of South African Photography	Fotografia Europea	2017
Memory, archives, future	Chiostri di San Pietro, Reggio Emilia, Italy	2017
Sea Views	Rijksmuseum, Amsterdam, the Netherlands	2017
Things Fall Apart	Vera and Donald Blinken Open Society Archives, Budapest, Hungary	2017
Gestures and Archives of the Present, Genealogies of the Future: A new lexicon for the biennial	10th Taipei Biennial, Taipei Fine Arts Museum, Taiwan	2016
Things Fall Apart	Calvert 22, London, UK; University of Bayreuth, Germany; Gallery Municipais, Lisbon, Portugal	2016
After Eden/Après Eden- The Walther Collection	La Maison Rouge, Paris, France	2015
History Lesson	Museum Centro Atlántico de Arte Moderno, Las Palmas, Spain	2015
What remains is tomorrow	South African Pavilion, 56th Venice Biennale, Italy	2015
THEOREM: You Simply Destroy the Image I Always Had of Myself	Mana Contemporary, New Jersey, USA	2015
Conflict, Time, Photography,	Tate Modern, London, UK	2014
Earth Matters: Land as material and metaphor in the arts of Africa	Fowler Museum, Los Angeles, California, USA	2014
Rise and Fall of Apartheid: Photography and the bureaucracy of everyday life	Museum Africa, Johannesburg, South Africa	2014
Apartheid and After	Huis Marseille, Amsterdam, the Netherlands	2014
Public Intimacy: Art and Other Ordinary Acts in South Africa	Yerba Buena Center for the Arts, San Francisco, California	2014
Unstable Territory: Borders and identity in contemporary art	Centro di Cultura Contemporanea Strozzina, Palazzo Strozzi, Florence, Italy	2013
Present Tense	Fundação Calouste Gulbenkian, Lisbon, Portugal; Fundação Calouste Gulbenkian -Délégation en France, Paris	2013
My Joburg	La Maison Rouge, Paris, France; Staatliche Kunstsammlungen, Dresden, Germany	2013
Distance and Desire: Encounters with the African Archive	The Walther Collection, Ulm, Germany	2013
Transition: Social Landscape	Rencontres d'Arles festival, Arles, France	2013
Social Landscape Project	Rencontres d’Arles, Paris, France	2013
The Rise and Fall of Apartheid: Photography and the bureaucracy of everyday life	Haus der Kunst, Munich, Germany	2013
Transitions – Social Landscape Project	Market Photo Workshop, Johannesburg, South Africa	2012
Trade Routes Over Time	Stevenson Gallery, Cape Town, South Africa	2012
Not My War	Michaelis Galleries, University of Cape Town, South Africa	2012
Making History	Museum für Moderne Kunst, Frankfurt, Germany	2012
Rise and Fall of Apartheid: Photography and the bureaucracy of everyday life	International Center of Photography, New York, USA	2012
Topography of War	Le Bal, Paris, France	2011
Neither Man Nor Stone	Iziko South African National Gallery, Cape Town, South Africa	2011
Lens: Fractions of Contemporary Photography and Video in South Africa	Stellenbosch University Art Museum, South Africa	2011
Les Rencontres d'Arles 2011 photography festival	France	2011
Appropriated Landscapes	Walther Collection, Ulm, Germany	2011
Figures and Fictions: Contemporary South African Photography	V&A Museum, London, UK	2011
Impressions from South Africa, 1965 to Now	Museum of Modern Art, New York, USA	2011

== Collections ==
Ractliffe's works are part of the following collections.
Name	Location
Apartheid Museum	Johannesburg, South Africa
Centre Georges Pompidou	Paris, France
Foundation A Stitching	Brussels, Belgium
Huis Marseille	Amsterdam, Netherlands
MOMA	New York, USA
SF MOMA	San Francisco, California
Iziko South African National Gallery	Cape Town, South Africa
The Deutsche Bank Collection	
The Metropolitan Museum of Art	New York, USA
The Walther Collection	Neu-Ulm, Swabia, Bavaria, Germany
University of Cape Town Art Collection	Cape Town, South Africa
University of South Africa Art Gallery	Pretoria, South Africa
WITS Art Museum	Johannesburg, South Africa
