= Jeannette Unite =

South African artist (born 1964)

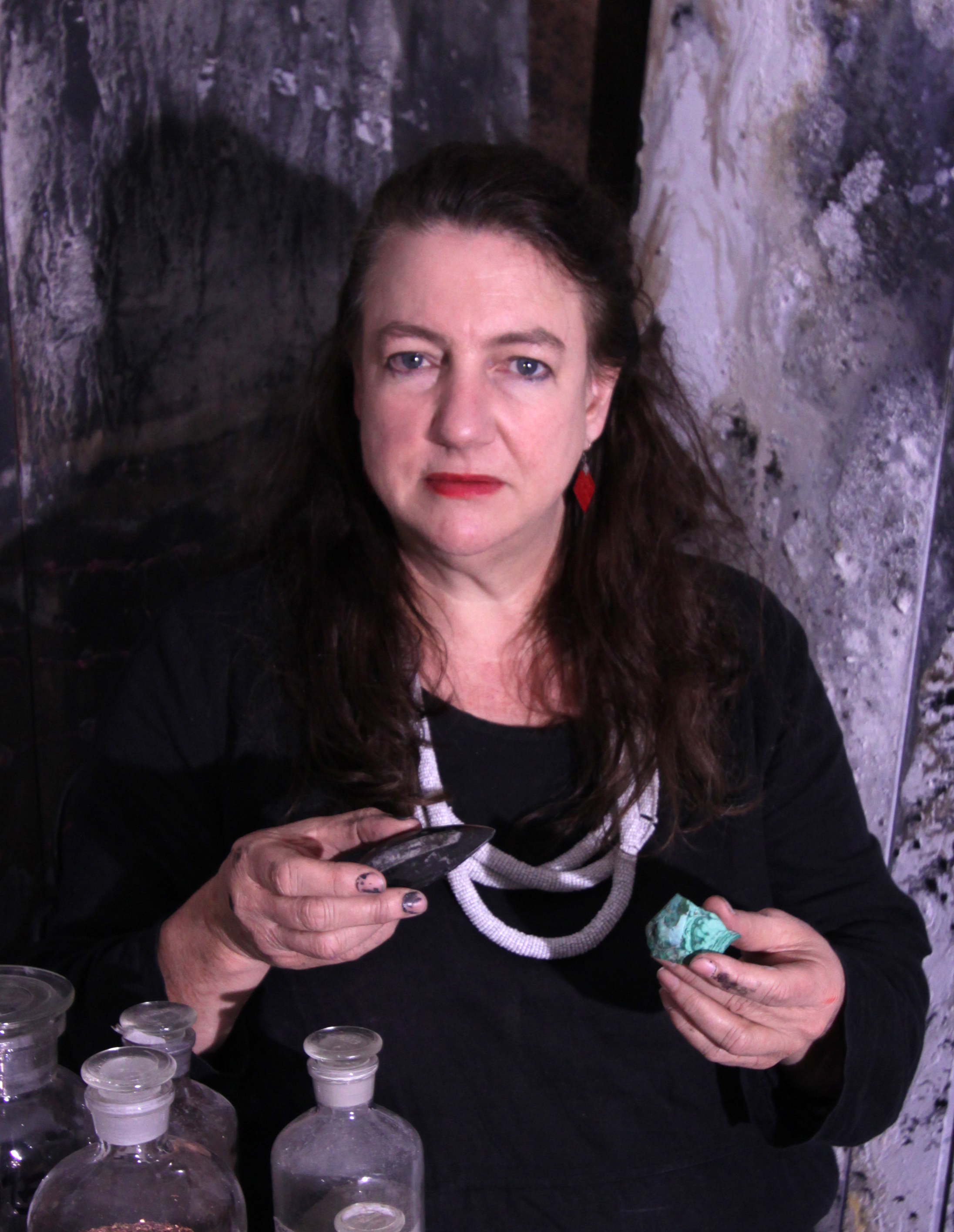
- Unite in 2016
- Born: 20 January 1964 (age 62)
- Education: Michaelis School of Fine Art
- Website: www.jeannetteunite.com

Jeannette Unite (born 20 January 1964) is a South African artist who has collected oxides, metal salts and residues from mines, heritage and industrial sites to develop paint, pastel and glass recipes for her large scale artworks that reflect on the mining and industrial sites where humanity's contemporary world is manufactured.

Her industrial-scale mining Headgear drawings and "TERRA" paintings were exhibited at Museum Ostwall, Dortmund, Germany in the reconstructed building on the site of mining headquarters for the Ruhr Valley in commemoration of the final year of underground coal mining in Germany.

Through 2014 and 2015, her research on Earth's stratigraphy with Department of Earth Sciences, Oxford University and Oxford University Museum, developed into a body of work exhibited at the Centre for Contemporary Art and the Natural World (CCANW), Exeter University, Devon, between October 2015 and February 2016. This travelling exhibition also formed part of the United Nations' Year of Soil and the British Geological Society's Year of Mud.

== Research ==
Unite's works reference mining heritage sourced from archives and museums. This includes early geological historical maps and texts that were created during the British Industrial Revolution to guide mining the coal that fueled the engines that drove modernity.

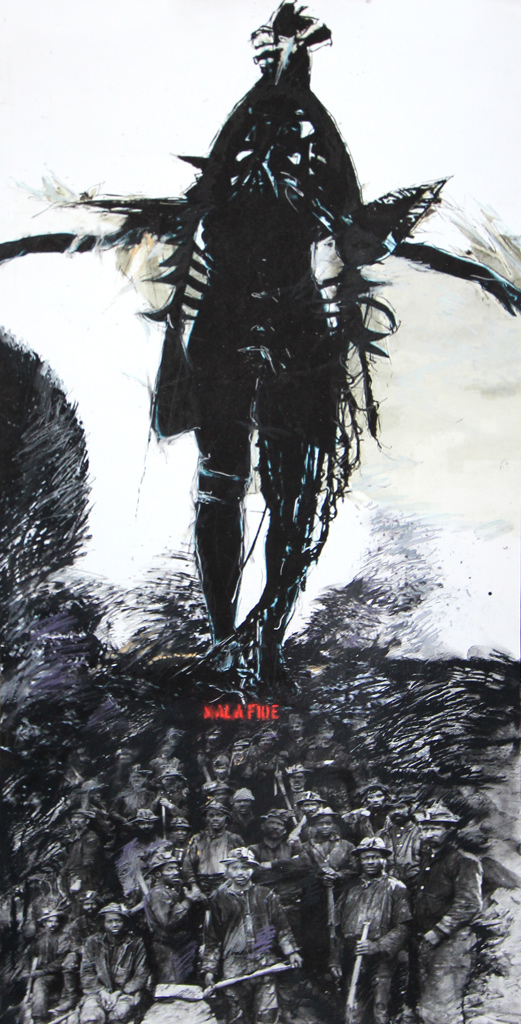
"Between the Strata of Trauma and Violence", artwork by Jeannette Unite.

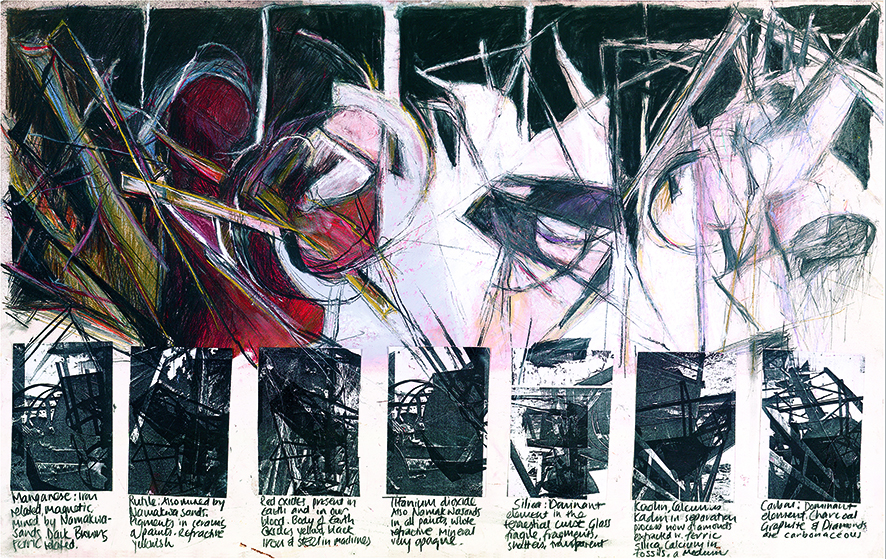
EARTHSCARS - Minerals and Metals, by Jeannette Unite.

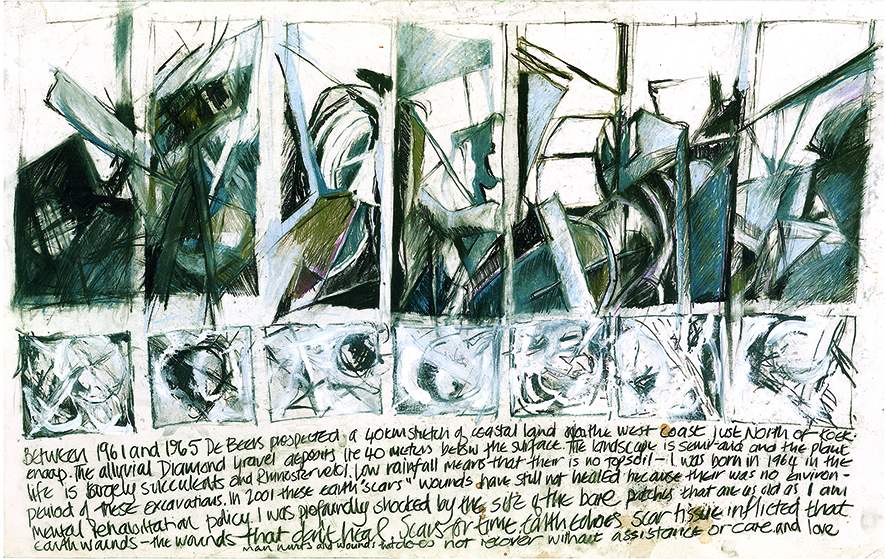
EARTHSCARS - A Visual Mining Exploration, by Jeannette Unite.

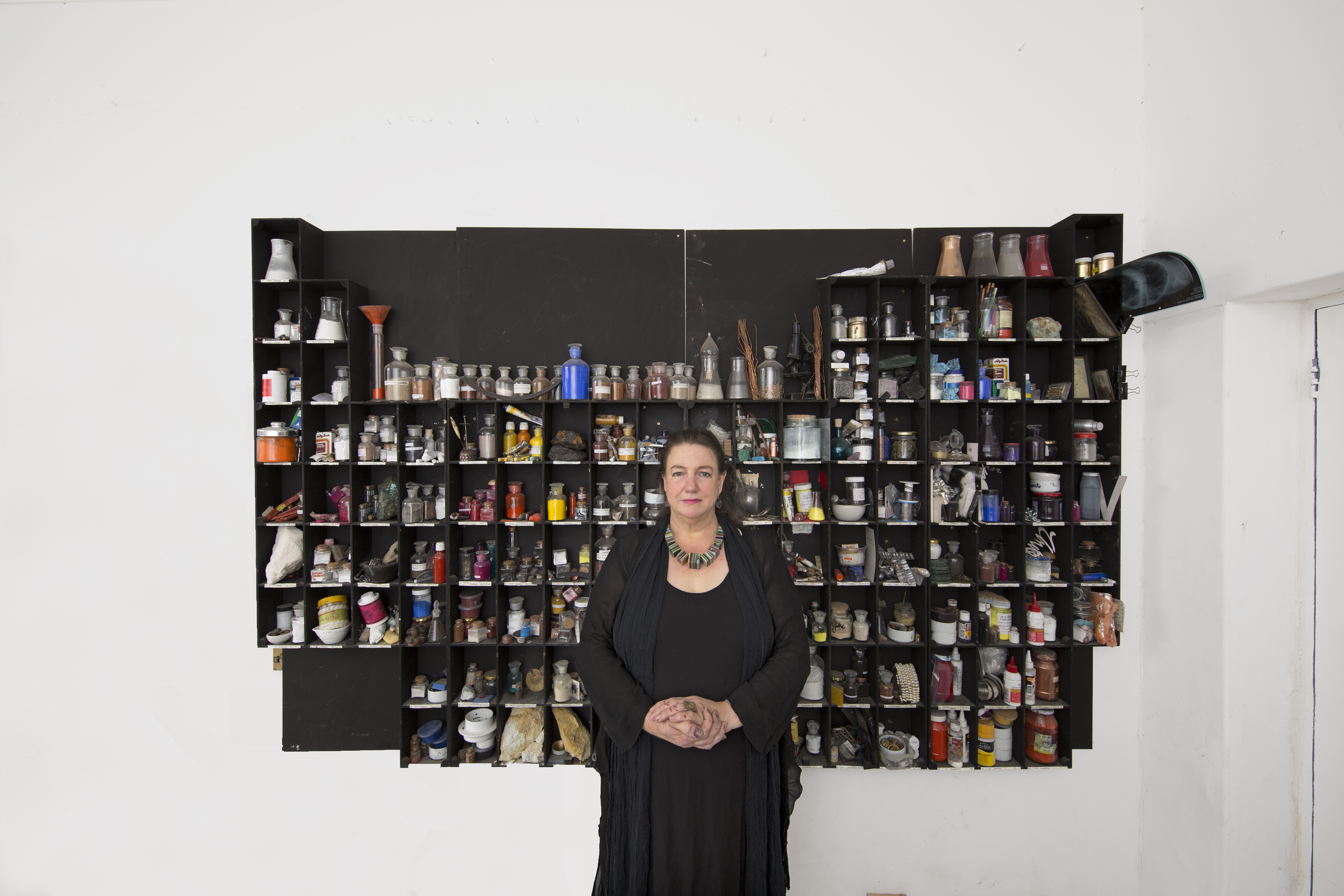
Artist Jeannette Unite with her 'paintbox' behind - the periodic table of minerals.

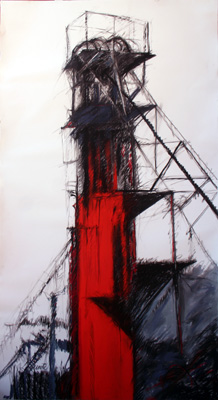
One of the "Headgear" drawings by Jeannette Unite

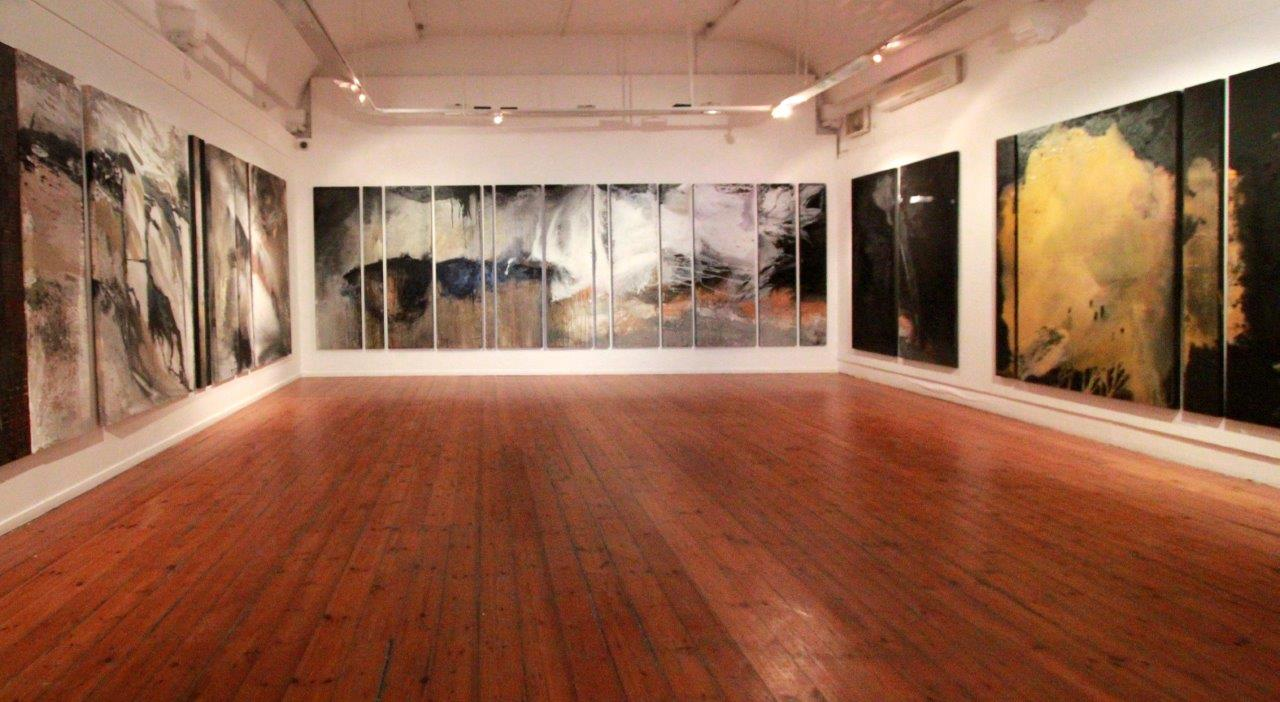
Installation view of Jeannette Unite's Master of Fine Art postgraduate exhibition

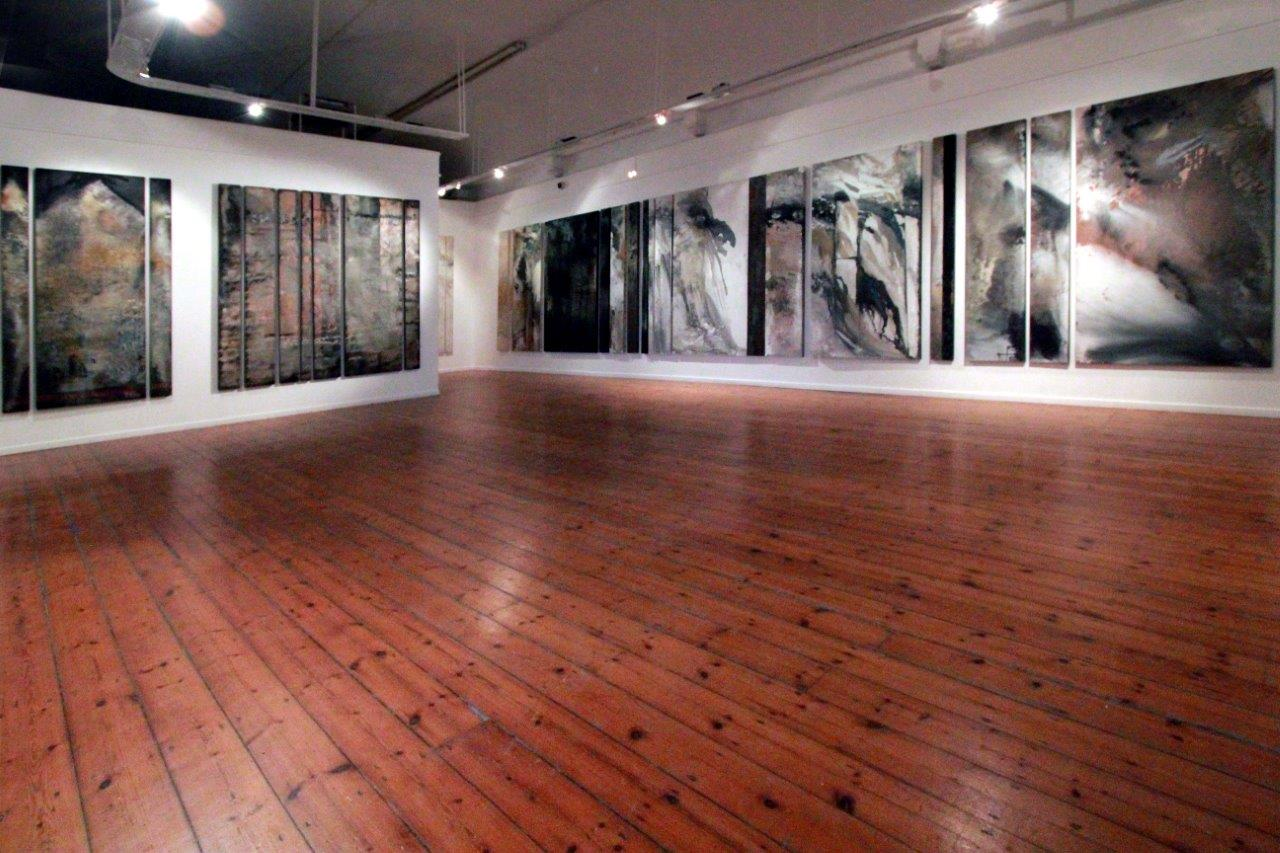
Installation view of Jeannette Unite's Master of Fine Art postgraduate exhibition

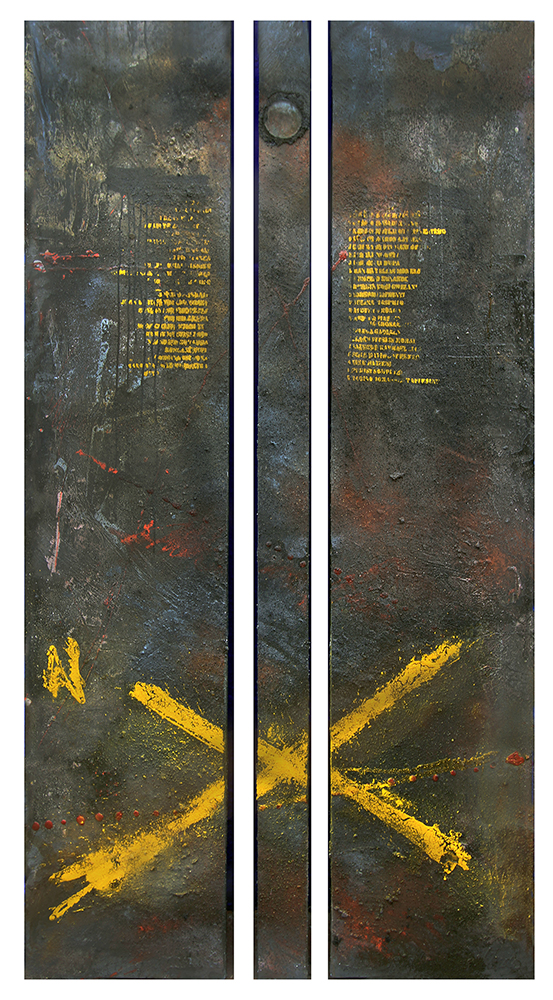
One of the commemorative works by Jeannette Unite on the Marikana massacre that took place in South Africa on 16 August 2012

== Education and community work ==
Unite graduated from Michaelis School of Fine Art in 1986, following 4 years of study. From 1987 to 1997, she taught printmaking and general art at Frank Joubert Art Centre, as well as teaching adult education drawing lessons & painting courses. During this time, she spent four years in correspondence with UNISA and provided art training to teachers in Nyanga, a local township area. From 2011 to 2016, she taught the Workshops in Materiality course at Michaelis School of Fine Art, a series of workshops centered around communicating her own unique style of paint preparation and utilization to students. In 2014, she completed her MFA (Masters in Fine Arts) at Michaelis, receiving a distinction.

== Selected exhibitions ==
2017 MEASURING MODERNITY, Borderline Art Space, Iasi, Romania

COMPLICIT GEOGRAPHIES, Eclectica Contemporary, Cape Town

2016

35th International Geology Congress, Invited Earth mining artist, CTICC

TERRA, Museum Am Ostwall, Dortmund, Germany

Mining Our Heritage | Bergbau Unser Erbe – Germany Preview, Abalone Hermanus Fynarts

In Plain Sight: Social Life in South Africa and Romania before and after 1989, Aparte Gallery of George Enescu Uni of Arts, Iasi & Borderline Art Space, Iasi, Romania

Out of the Fire, Into the Light, Dr Ingram Anderson, Glass exhibition, AVA, Pretoria

STRATA two-woman show with Isabel Mertz at ISart, Franscchhoek

Colori sotto il Visuvio (The Colours of Vesuvius), Il ramo d'oro Centre of Arts and Culture, Naples, Italy

2015

Bi-Centenary William 'Strata' Smith, Innovation Centre, University of Exeter

PREVIEW Bi-Centenary William 'Strata' Smith, Jo'burg Art Fair Fringe curated by Carol Brown, Mboneng, Johannesburg

LAW & ORE, Youngblood Foundation Gallery, Cape Town

Between Democracies curated By Judy Peter, Karen von Vey & Richard Gregor, Constitution Hill, Johannesburg

Fear & Loss in the Industrial Karoo, Curator Katie Du Toit, Oliewenhuis, Bloemfontein | Pretoria Art Museum | Graaff-Rennet

Blowing in the Wind, curator Carol Brown, KZNSA Gallery, Durban and University of the Orange Free State, Art Museum.

Between Conceptual and Spiritual, curated by Ortrud Mulder, Abalone Gallery, part of FynArts Festival, Hermanus

2014

LAW & ORE, Abalone Gallery, Hermanus

EXTRACT, Youngblood Gallery, Cape Town and Cologne, Germany

COMPLICIT GEOGRAPHIES, Fine Arts master's degree exhibition, Michaelis Galleries, Cape Town (MFA with Distinction)

2013

HERE / THERE, UCT and WITS Masters students, Michaelis Galleries, Cape Town

HAWK Guerrilla Video Projections on land and group Art Intervention, (curator Lien Botha) Overstrand, Western Cape

2012

Residuum: Mines & Machines Installation at the Western Cape Archives & Records Service, Old Gaol, Roeland Street, Cape Town

Exhibition & Presentation: 9th IMHC International Mining History Conference, Johannesburg

HAWK Group Art Intervention, (curated by Lien Botha) Overberg, Western Cape (project printed map)

Return to the Archive, Museum Africa, Johannesburg

2011

Paradox of Plenty, Michaelis Galleries, University of Cape Town - Installation of mining archive & artist-in-residency

Mining the African Industrial Landscape: Presentation; Conflicts & Natural Resources: African Studies Conference, AEGIS, Universidad Autónoma de Madrid, Spain

Artists Visual Response to the Industrial Landscape: Presentation The Paradox of Plenty, Joburg Art Fair, September

On the Surface: The Heritage of Mines and Mining; conference University Innsbruck, Austria

Iizkhwepha Zhetu / Shaping our Minds, (curated by Phumzile Dlamini) Durban Art Gallery (catalogue)

3 Parts: More Harmony, South African, United Arab Emirates & Mozambique artists (curated by Phumzile Dlamini), Durban Art Gallery (catalogue)

Alumni Exhibition & Auction, Michaelis School of Fine Art, University of Cape Town (catalogue)

2010

6 Meters Under, 4th Beijing International Art Biennale, China

The Lie of the Land: Representations of the South African Landscape,(curated by Michael Godby), Michaelis Collection, Old Town House Museum (catalogue)

TERRA: Above Below, Oliewenhuis Museum, Bloemfontein (Catalogue)

Mineral Resources and Residues of Power in the African Industrial Landscape, Presentation at ICACD (3rd International Conference on African Cultural Development) Cultural Imperatives for Development: 50 Years Post Independent Africa, Kumasi, Ghana
2009

Headgears, 9th Tashkent Biennale, Central Asia, Uzbekistan

Presentation ‘The Colonial Gaze’ Scientific conference, Urban Philosophy: Anthropological Landscape’, Tashkent, Uzbekistan

Earthscars: Mining the African Landscape: Presentation AngloGold Ashanti, Turbine Hall, Johannesburg

Headgear, Inaugural solo exhibition, AngloGold HQ, Turbine Hall, JHB

Earthscars: Mining African Landscape, XLIIIrd AICA (International Association of Art Critics) Congress, The Relations Between Art and Science: Complicity, Criticality, Knowledge, Dublin Castle, Ireland

On Top of the World, (curated by Andre Vorster) (catalogue)

Earthscars, 20:20 Presentation at VANSA, Spin Street, Cape Town

2008

Remembering the Future, Western Cape Archives and Records Service, Old Gaol, Roeland Street, Cape Town

Re-structuring the Colonial, Group Exhibition, Thompson Gallery, Johannesburg

2007

Hot Earth, Artworks in response to travels to copper mines of Namaqualand. Thompson Gallery, Johannesburg

Visions of Africa, (curated by Dirk Oegema) Pretoria Art Museum

2006

HERM: Boundaries Between the Wild and Cultivated, collaboration Cumbria Institute of Arts, Ann Bryant Art Museum, East London

2005

Gunfree South Africa, Constitution Hill Auction, Johannesburg

2004

Earthscars: A Visual Mining Exploration, William Humphreys Art Museum, Kimberley

Earthscars: A Visual Mining Exploration, Mozambique National Gallery, Maputo, Mozambique

Earthscars: A Visual Mining Exploration, Irma Stern Museum Gallery, University of Cape Town

Surfacing, with Lynne Lomofsky, Unite Studio, Cape Town

2003

S.U.M., Bag Factory Residency Exhibition, Fordsburg Art Studios, Johannesburg (catalogue)

Sentences & Gestures, Zebra II, Hampstead, London

South African Artists, Old Mutual Place, London

2001

Sentences, Bell-Roberts Contemporary Gallery, Cape Town (catalogue)

Heart For Art, Red Cross Fundraiser, The Foundry, Cape Town

SA Today, Signature Artist, (curator Patrick Lagus), Fair Centre, Helsinki

Blue Danube, animated projection, edited by Koeka Stander, concert with Sibelius Orchestra, Helsinki, Finland

2000

Sentences, art animation film, 8 minutes, edited by Koeka Stander

Artichoke, Multimedia event, Sandton Civic Centre, Johannesburg

1999

Thresholds, Irma Stern Museum Gallery, University of Cape Town

Inaugural Group Exhibition, National Library of South Africa, Cape Town

Softserve, Public Eye Event, IZIKO South African National Gallery, Cape Town

Thupela Workshop, IZIKO South African National Gallery, Cape Town

1994

Print Triennial, Musee d’Art Contemporain Internationale, Lyon, France

1993

South Africa in Black and White, Print exhibition (curated by Ray Maylen), South African National Gallery, Cape Town

Aids Awareness, AVA Association for Visual Arts, Cape Town

Brides, (curated by Christopher Peter), Irma Stern Museum Gallery, University of Cape Town

1992

Art Now, AVA Association for Visual Arts, Cape Town

1990

Critics’ Choice, AVA Association for Visual Arts, Cape Town

1981

Young Artists’ Exhibition, 1st Prize, Kellogg's Foundation (catalogue)

== Publications and texts ==
- COMPLICIT GEOGRAPHIES, 2016, Edited by Ivor Powell. 400 page monograph on artwork by Jeannette Unite investigating how wealth from land and Earth is divided, measured and allocated and global cycles of extraction, consumption and waste.
- TERRA, 2012, Edited by Andrew Lamprecht and Ivor Powell with contributions by Ashraf Jamal, Kathryn Smith, Marian Tredoux and Bongani Ndodana-Breen. 192 page monograph surveying twenty years of Unite's practice and research.
- ‘Headgear: Mining Engineering Drawings’, Critical Interventions, USA 6: 91-101, Spring 2010.
- ‘TERRA: Sands and Detritus Soiled with History’, Art South Africa, 9(1): 98-9, Spring 2010.
- ‘Exploring the Visual Residues of Colonial Exploitation’, Nukta Art: Contemporary Art Magazine of Pakistan. 5 (1): 80-85, 2010.

== Awards, grants and residencies ==
- Mzansi Golden Economy Grant, SA Department Arts and Culture (funding for TERRA in Dortmund, Germany and COMPLICIT GEOGRAPHIES, CCANW, Exeter University, Devon) 2016
- MacIver Scholarship, Michaelis School of Fine Art, University of Cape Town. 2013
- Twamley Postgraduate Bursary, University of Cape Town. 2013
- Jules Kramer Travel Award, University of Cape Town. 2012
- Academic Bursary from Michaelis School of Fine Arts, University of Cape Town 2012
- CCA (Center for Curating the Archive), University of Cape Town. 2012
- Fellowship Artist-in-Residency, Michaelis Galleries, University of Cape Town 2011
- AEGIS - African Travel Grant for African resource conference closing presentation, University Autonoma, Madrid Spain 2011
- Art Moves Africa (AMA) Research Grant for Travel in Africa 2009
- Tashkent Biennial (merit award for original use of natural materials) 2009
- CSIR, Awarded Public Art Competition /Glass Wall Installation, Department Science and Technology Buildings, Pretoria 2006
- Bag Factory, Fordsburg Artists’ Studios (Triangle Network) Johannesburg 2003
- Constitution Hill (Glass & Steel Water History Sculpture) Finalist 2003
- Thupela Workshop, South African National Gallery Annex. 2000
- Thupela Workshop, South African National Gallery Annex.1999
- Kellogg's Young Artists Award, First Prize National Art Competition. Prize: (Four year all-inclusive international art scholarship.) 1981

== Bibliography ==
- Barnes, M. (18 October 1981). "Kellogg's Young Artist Award". Sunday Times.
- Emslie, A. (9 April 1990). "Angry Artist puts Violence on Walls". Cape Times.
- Benita, M. (2 May 1990). "Female nudes lost in paint". The Argus.
- Kramer, N. (23 March 1990). "Artist work strong, thick & gestural". The Argus.
- Munitz, B. (October 1992). "Bushmen Art". Cape Times.
- Vosloo, E. (22 May 1994). "Jeannette Unites Vibrant Energy with her Artwork". Sunday Times.
- Jolly, L. (17 April 2001). "Music brings paintings to life". Cape Argus.
- Meylan, R. (15 December 2001). "SA Art in Finland". Weekend Argus.
- Verkkola, T. (December 2001). "Kaukainen Etela-Afrikka onkin hyvin laheinen". Helsingin Sanomat. Helsinki.
- Goniwe, T. (December 2001). "Fragile Firedancer Flower". Design Indaba Magazine.
- Edmunds, P. (2001). "Jeannette Unite at Bell-Roberts Contemporary". Artthrob.
- 2001 Emslie, A., 'Jeannette Unite: Sentences', (Catalogue), Cape Town: Bell-Roberts Contemporary.
- 2002 Riitta-Eiilisa, L., ‘Straussin musiikki juhlistiuuden vuodenpaivaa Helsingissa Finland’, Helsingin Sanomat, January.
- 2003 S.U.M residency exhibition, Bag Factory, Studios, (Catalogue).
- 2004 Minnaar, M., ‘Energy, Emotion and Eco-Morality’, Cape Times: Independent Newspapers, 25 February.
- 2004 Roper, C., ‘Art Pick of the Week’, Mail & Guardian, 20–26 February.
- 2004 Smith, K., ‘Art Pick of the Week’, Mail & Guardian, 10–16 December.
- 2005 Smith, K., ‘Art of 2 Cities’, Art News, London, 2nd quarter.
- 2007 Lamprecht, B., ‘Hot Earth’, Die Beeld, October.
- 2008 Davenport, J., ‘One-person Cape Town Exhibition Explores Aesthetic Appeal of Mining’, Mining Weekly, October.
- 2008 Keylock, M., ‘Mining the Past’, Mail & Guardian, September.
- 2008 Bryant, J., 'Archive exhibit', Design Ways Magazine, 2 September.
- 2008 Wilkinson, V., ’Africa's Heritage True Grit’, Weekend Argus, 21 September.
- 2009 Lange. J., ‘Mined over Matter’, Design Magazine Creative Economy.
- 2009 Lambrecht, B., ’Die Mens en Sy Opgewing’, De Kat, September.
- 2009 Knox, B., 'Headgear: an Exhibition by Jeannette Unite', Look Away, Johannesburg, Issue 13 Quarter 4: 24.
- 2009 Prinsloo, L., ‘Gold-Mining Major Hosts Mining-Themed Exhibition’, Engineering News Magazine, 10 July.
- 2009 Lamprecht, A., 'Artist Bio', Artthrob, Online
- 2010 Thurman, C., ‘Mines, Headgear & the Mind’, 18 February.
- 2010 Unite, J., 'Earthscars: Above Below', (Catalogue), Oliewenhuis Art Museum, Bloemfontein.
- 2010 Godby, M., ‘The Lie of the Land’, (Catalogue), Michaelis Collection, IZIKO Museum.
- 2010 Beijing Biennial, Chinese Artists Association, (Catalogue).
- 2011 Bell, S., ‘Resourceful Artist Digs Deep’, Cape Times, March.
- 2011 Van Bosch, C., ‘Vlook Myne’, Die Burger, March.
- 2012 Thurman, C., "'Subterranean meets the surface' as art", Business Day, 22 November.
- 2012 Powell, I., ‘Mines, Machines and Residual Power’, Cape Times, 3 August.
- 2012 MacKenny, V., 'Land Matters - a Visual Exploration of Land, Mining and Resources in South Africa', Art South Africa, Vol 11 Issue 4: 25, 5 December.
- 2012 Martin, W., ‘Mining Artists Digs Deep for Material’, The Good Weekend, Weekend Argus, Sunday, July 15.
- 2012 Adams, S., ‘Book Review: TERRA’, Amandla, September Issue no. 26/27. Unite's artwork used for special Marikana issue.
- 2013 'HERE/THERE: WITS UCT Masters Exhibition', (Catalogue).
- 2013 Headgear used for cover image for the seminal mining history book Digging Deep by Jade Davenport.
- 2014 Jolly, L., ‘Paradoxical Beauty of Toxic Minerals’ Review, Cape Times, July 24.
- 2014 DeKATV, Gerald Scholtz Interview for Arts feature, October.
- 2014 'New Contrast', South African Literary Journal, Volume 42 No. 3.
- 2014 Daehnke, N., ‘South Africa: 10x12’, Imago Mundi, Luciano Benetton Collection.
- 2014 Top Billing Episode featuring Unite's work, 3 September.
- 2014 ‘Pringle Bay Dream Drowns in Red Tape’, Noseweek, Issue 176, June.
- 2014 Collison, C., ‘An Artist's Quest for Creative Gold’, Atlantic Sun, July 17.
- 2015 Mkhwanazi, K., 'Artists who drill below the obvious', The M&G Online.
- 2015 Nel, A., 'Seeds Remind Jeannette Unite of the Wonder of our Planet', Wanted profile feature, Business Day, October, Online
- 2015 Aupias, L., ‘An Alchemist's Eye’, Private Edition, issue 27 April.
- 2015 CCTV, China Central TV, Episode featuring Unite's work, February.
- 2015 Kolver, L., ‘Artist advocates for art representation at Indaba’, Mining Weekly, 6 March.
- 2015 Roets, A., 'Jeannette Unite's Soils of War', The Citizen, 11 September, Online
