= Annette Kelm =

German contemporary artist and photographer (born 1975)

Annette Kelm (born 1975 in Stuttgart, West Germany) is a German contemporary artist and photographer who is particularly known as a conceptual artist. Kelm uses medium or large format cameras in her work, creating still life and portraits. She favours using analog photography methods in her work.

Kelm graduated from the Hochschule für bildende Künste in Hamburg in 2000, after which she moved to Berlin. She was awarded the Camera Austria Award for Contemporary Photography by the City of Graz in 2015.

== Work ==
Kelm explores ideas through "baffling narratives" which use typology, patterns and the intersection of design and technology. Her work has been inspired by traditional photography genres such as the still life, landscapes and portraits. The New York Times describes her work as playing with "watered-down semiotics."

Since 2019, Kelm has been working on the series Die Bücher (The Books), photographs of first editions of books that were banned, and in many cases publicly burned, under the Nazi regime. The project was first presented with 50 works in the exhibition Tell me yesterday tomorrow at the NS-Dokumentationszentrum in Munich in 2019 and was subsequently shown at the Salon Berlin of the Museum Frieder Burda in 2020. The complete series of around 100 works was exhibited for the first time at the Kunsthalle zu Kiel in 2022. Reviewing the Kiel exhibition, the taz wrote that Kelm restores dignity to the banned and burned books by photographing each cover individually.

== Teaching ==
Kelm was a visiting professor of artistic photography at the Karlsruhe University of Arts and Design in the winter semester of 2021. In 2025, she completed a term as substitute professor (Vertretungsprofessorin) in the photography class of the Kunstakademie Düsseldorf.

== Exhibition History ==
- MoMA PS1 (The Gold Standard, 10/29/2006 – 01/15/2007)
- CCA Wattis Institute for Contemporary Art in San Francisco (PASSENGERS: 1.6 ANNETTE KELM, 02/06/2008 – 03/01/2008)
- Kunsthalle Zürich (Annette Kelm, 01/24/2009 – 04/26/2009)
- 54th Venice Biennale (06/04/2011 – 11/27/2011)
- Museum of Modern Art (New Photography 2013, 09/14/2013 – 01/06/2014)
- Whitney Museum of American Art (Collected by Thea Westreich Wagner and Ethan Wagner, 11/20/2015 – 03/06/2016)
- VOX Centre de l'image contemporaine, Montreal, Quebec, Canada (Annette Kelm, 05/11/2016 – 06/25/2016)
- Kunsthalle Wien, Vienna (Tomato Target, 2018)
- Kunsthalle Kiel (Die Bücher, 2022)
- Projektbüro Deutsches Fotoinstitut, Düsseldorf (Die Bücher, 2025)

== Honours and awards ==
- 1999 Kodak Young Photographers Award
- 2004 Artist residency Heanavesi, Finland Working Grant for Fine Art, Hamburg
- 2005 ART COLOGNE-Award for young art Working Grant of Stiftung Kunstfonds Travel-Grant Los Angeles
- 2009 Nominated for the Preis der Nationalgalerie für junge Kunst; winner of the audience award (Publikumspreis)
- 2015 Camera Austria – Award for contemporary photography, Graz
- 2026 Nominated for the Pauli-Preis, Kunsthalle Bremen

=== Memberships ===
- 2026 Member of the Academy of Arts, Berlin

== Galleries ==
- Esther Schipper Gallery, Berlin, Germany.
- Andrew Kreps Gallery, New York, USA.
- Galerie Meyer Kainer, Vienna, Austria.
- Herald St Gallery, London, England.
- Marc Foxx Gallery, Los Angeles, CA, USA.
- Taka Ishii Gallery, Tokyo, Japan.
- Gió Marconi Gallery, Milan, Italy.

== Collections ==
Annette Kelm's work has been collected by the Centre Pompidou, Paris, the Guggenheim Museum, New York, the Kunstmuseum Stuttgart, Germany, the Museum of Contemporary Art, Los Angeles, the Museum of Modern Art, New York, and Tate, London.

== See also ==
- List of German women artists
