= Camera Austria Award =

Awards
year	photographer
1989	Nan Goldin
1991	Olivier Richon
1993	Seiichi Furuya
1995	David Goldblatt
1997	[none]
1999	Hans-Peter Feldmann
2001	Allan Sekula
2003	Aglaia Konrad
2005	Walid Raad
2007	Marika Asatiani
2009	Sanja Iveković
2011	Heidrun Holzfeind
2013	Joachim Koester
2015	Annette Kelm
2017	Jochen Lempert
2019	Lebohang Kganye
2021	Belinda Kazeem-Kamiński
2023	Joanna Piotrowska

The Camera Austria Award for Contemporary Photography by the City of Graz (Camera Austria-Preis für zeitgenössische Fotografie der Stadt Graz) is an award given every two years since 1989 by the city of Graz.
