= Sanja Iveković =

Croatian visual artist, designer and activist

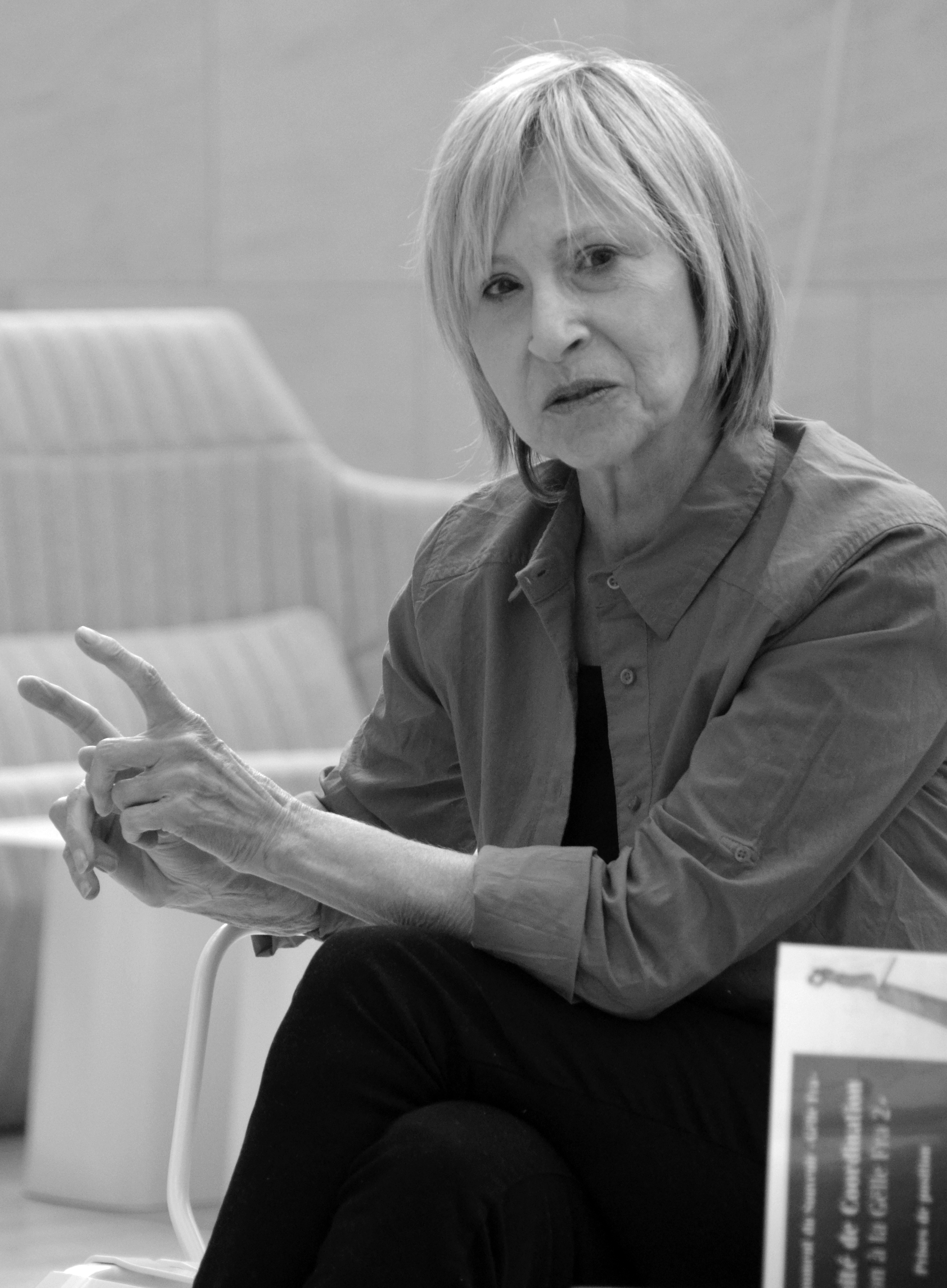
Sanja Iveković in May 2012

Sanja Iveković (born 1949 in Zagreb) is a Croatian photographer, performer, sculptor and installation artist. Her work is known to tackle such issues as female identity, media, consumerism, and political strife. Considered to be one of the leading artists from the former Yugoslavia, she continues to inspire many young artists.

== Early life and career ==
Iveković was born in Zagreb in 1949, when it was still part of Yugoslavia under the rule of Marshal Josip Broz Tito. Her work in the 70s focused on feminism, with a gradual shift toward global politics of war after the 90s, following Croatia's independence.

Iveković studied graphics at the Zagreb Academy of Fine Arts from 1968 to 1971. Her artistic career began during the Croatian Spring in the early 1970s when, together with other artists, she broke away from mainstream settings, pioneering video, conceptual photomontages and performance. Much of her work is centred on her own life and the place of women in today's society. She was the first artist in Croatia to label herself a feminist artist. She has been a key player at the Centre for Women's Studies in Zagreb since it opened in 1994.

Iveković's activism extends beyond her art. She has founded or been engaged with Croatian women's organizations such as ELEKTRA-Women's Art Center, B.a.B.e., Autonomous Cultural Center—ATTACK!, Center for Women War Victims, and the Association of Feminists. For example, in her 2007 work Mohnfeld, she collaborated with Lezbor from Zagreb, Croatia, and with RAWA, the Revolutionary Association of the Women of Afghanistan.

In 2023, she launched the Sanja Iveković Institute (ICI).

== Artwork ==
Since the beginning of her artistic career, Iveković has always been interested in the representation of women in society. Among her early works are "Double Life" (1975) where she pairs 66 photographs of her private life with similar shots of models in magazine advertisements, "Make Up-Make Down" (1978) with filmed or photographed self-portraits, and "General Alert: Soap Opera" (1995) produced for television. "Figure & Ground" (2006) depicts collages of female models looking like armed terrorists covered in blood and wearing military-inspired clothing from top designers.

In Personal Cuts, which aired on prime-time Yugoslav national television in 1982, Sanja Iveković challenges the official narrative of socialism by juxtaposing state propaganda with personal gesture. Archival footage of mass rallies, monuments, and Tito’s speech is intercut with scenes of the artist cutting holes into a black stocking stretched over her face—evoking a homemade balaclava and a quiet act of resistance.

"Women's House", an ongoing project since 1998, displays plaster casts of the faces of abused women arranged in a semicircle. "Women's House (Sunglasses)" is a series of posters, billboards, and magazine inserts, focusing on gender violence in postcommunist Croatia.

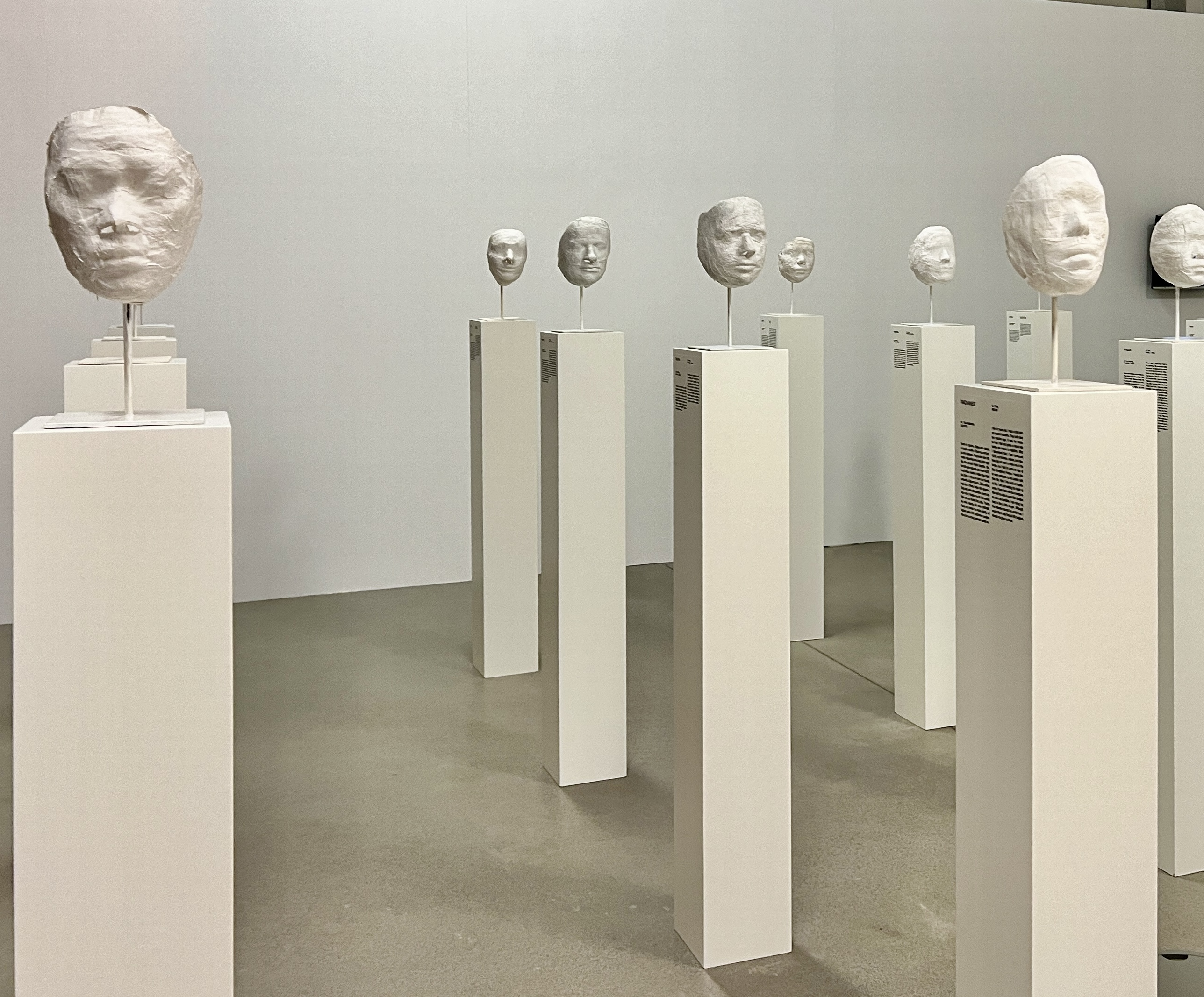
Sanja Iveković, Women’s House, 1998 - 2002

At the 2010 Gwangju Biennale, Iveković's "On the Barricades" was a living memorial commemorating the Gwangju people's uprising of 18 May 1980. Based on her "Rohrbach Living Memorial" (2005) depicting the fate of the Roma victims of the holocaust, the new presentation was enacted by volunteers representing statues of the victims. They were surrounded by 10 monitors presenting slideshows of photos of the 545 victims, whose eyes were intentionally closed by the artist. In 2017, at documenta 14, Sanja Iveković rebuilt the foundation of a lost 1926 revolutionary monument by Mies van der Rohe, using old bricks in a public square in Athens to reflect on how cities carry political memory. She transformed the space into more than just an artwork by organizing a live event with artists and activists, imagining a new antifascist feminist front through spoken word and collective voices. It was a bold blend of history, feminism, and public action—looking back to push forward.

== Lady Rosa of Luxembourg ==
Referring to perhaps her most famous piece Iveković says, "In all my work since the beginning of the seventies," Iveković has written, "three major themes have preoccupied me the most: gender, identity, and memory. For me, as a visual artist, the starting point of my research is the visual representation of woman in our everyday life transmitted to us by mass media. As a feminist, I have tried to make art that reflects my political consciousness of what it means to be a woman in a patriarchal culture."

One of Iveković's most notable pieces has been the "Lady Rosa of Luxembourg" sculpture. In 2001, she replicated Luxembourg's national symbol Gëlle Fra (Golden Lady) by making the woman look visibly pregnant, naming her after Rosa Luxembourg, and by altering the accompanying plaque's text to read "WHORE, BITCH, MADONNA, VIRGIN." Topping an obelisk which for some time was placed in the vicinity of the original, her "Rosa Luxembourg" caused considerable consternation. The most vocal complaints were about the plaque's language, with calls for Erna Hennicot-Schoepges, Luxembourg's minister of culture, to resign. The sculpture was recreated during Iveković's exhibition at the Museum of Modern Art in 2011, in which Roberta Smith for The New York Times stated:

Named for the Marxist philosopher and activist Rosa Luxemburg, who was murdered by Berlin police during the thwarted German Revolution of 1919, this work caused a furor when it was exhibited in Luxembourg in 2001, in part because it was displayed in a public park within sight of a nearly identical but unpregnant sculpture that is a war monument. Wall vitrines lined with newspaper clippings attest to the extensive press coverage it received, as do excerpts from television news interviews playing on monitors. “Lady Rosa” clearly functioned as a kind of lightning rod, as interesting for what it set off as for what it actually was. In one television interview a young man points out that people were more offended by the words on the sculpture’s base than by the fact that countless women and children are beaten and abused every day.

== Awards and recognition ==
In 2009, Iveković was the winner of the Camera Austria Award as photography was recognized as an integral part of her conceptual work. The jury mentioned the topicality of her work and its significance for the younger generation as well as her social and political commitment to enhancing the role of women in society through works such as "Women's House".

In 2014 she was shortlisted for the Artes Mundi prize, exhibiting her photography-based works, GEN XX (1997–2001) and The Disobedient (The Revolutionaries) at the Turner House Gallery, Penarth, Wales.

== Selected exhibitions and performances ==
- SC Gallery, Zagreb, 1970
- Triangle, Savska 1, Zagreb, 10 May 1979
- Town-Crier, Franklin Furnace, New York, 18 May 1982
- Center for Film, Zagreb, 1986
- Manifesta 2: European Biennial of Contemporary Art, Luxembourg, 1998
- "Sanja Iveković: Personal Cuts," Galerie im Taxispalais, Innsbruck, Austria 2001
- 10,000 Lives, Eighth Gwangju Biennale, South Korea, 2010
- Sanja Iveković: Sweet Violence, MoMA, New York, December 18, 2011 – March 26, 2012
- Sanja Iveković: Unknown Heroine, South London Gallery & Calvert 22, London, December 14, 2012 – February 24, 2013
- Sanja Iveković: WORKS OF HEART (1970.-2023.), MSU, Zagreb, June 15 - November 2, 2023
- The Visible ones (Vidljive), MSU, Zagreb, June 18 - October 1, 2023
