= Wang Qingsong =

Chinese photographer

Wang Qingsong (born 1966) is a Chinese photographer.

== Early life and education ==
He was born in Daqing, China in 1966, and grew up in Hubei. He studied at the Sichuan Academy of Art. He moved to Beijing in 1993. On his background, he said, "I think there are many regional distinctions that I have incorporated into my art. For example, being born in Heilongjiang Province, I remember a lot of Soviet tanks going around when I was three. At that time, China had a confrontation with the Soviet Union. When we moved to Hubei Province, many people were assigned there to work on an oil field that used to be a swamp. In Sichuan, I was in one of the most populous cities in the world and the most important memories were of all the itinerant peasant workers from Chongqing. Then, in 1993, the huge urbanization strive in Beijing also impacted my art. All of these experiences have given me a lot of inspiration."

== Career ==
He began his career as an oil painter, then moved on to photography.

He considers himself both a journalist and an artist, saying, "I think it is very meaningless if an artist only creates art for art's sake. For me, the dramatic changes in China have transformed China into a huge playground or construction site. Whenever I go into the city I feel suffocated by the pollution, social contradictions, and so forth. All of these factors contribute to the fact that artists cannot just make art for art's sake. I think it would be absurd for an artist to ignore what's going on in society." His art focuses on political topics such as the government of China.

== Notable works ==
=== Skyscraper ===
In 2009, the Hammer Museum exhibited his piece Skyscraper:

In Skyscraper, Qingsong employed 30 scaffolding workers from the countryside near Beijing during a month long production, to build a 35meter high ‘skyscraper’ out of gold-painted iron scaffolding. Using stop-action 35mm film he captures the entire process, but without showing the workers. China has been growing at breakneck speed but what is not always noticed, like Wang’s process behind his photos, is the immediate effect and sacrifices of millions of displaced and anonymous people. The end of the film shows fireworks exploding from the top of the skyscraper in a jubilant but dark celebration as we listen to three women sing a Chinese version of “Silent Night, Holy Night.”

=== The Bloodstained Shirt ===
He works mostly in China, but in 2018, he created the piece The Bloodstained Shirt while visiting Michigan. The University of Michigan Museum of Art, where the piece was shown, wrote of it,

In The Bloodstained Shirt (2018), Chinese artist Wang Qingsong restages in Highland Park, Michigan, an iconic 1959 drawing by Wang Shikuo of peasants rising up against a cruel landlord and triumphantly reclaiming their right to the land. Wang’s projects are usually located in China, but while visiting southeast Michigan he was struck by the similarities between the effects of inequitable real estate development on local communities in Detroit, Highland Park, and his native Beijing. His large-scale photograph, set in an abandoned factory building in Highland Park and featuring more than seventy volunteers, collapses two moments in history to present a vivid reminder of the human consequences of the ruthless pursuit of profit and the power of collective action. The exhibition includes works created in collaboration with area residents that give voice to their concerns and their hopes for transformation and renewal.

=== On the Field of Hope ===
He created his piece On the Field of Hope during the 2020 COVID-19 pandemic. In the summer of 2020, it was on display at the Tang Contemporary Art gallery in Beijing. The gallery wrote that his work "showcases the tension between changing societal realities and human desires, and imaginatively presents the ongoing drama that hovers between fields of the past and hopes for the future."
