= Tamar Garb =

British art historian

Tamar Garb FBA is Durning Lawrence Professor in the Department of History of Art at University College London. A researcher of French art of the late nineteenth and early twentieth centuries, Garb has published numerous catalogue essays and books that address feminism, the body, sexuality, and gender in cultural representations.

Garb has also written essays about numerous contemporary artists, such as Christian Boltanski, Mona Hatoum, Nancy Spero, and Massimo Vitali.

Garb has also organized several art exhibitions, including Reisemalheurs at the Freud Museum in London in 2007 (on South African painter Vivienne Koorland), and Figures and Fictions: Contemporary South African Photography at the Victoria and Albert Museum in London in 2011.

More recently, she has been researching and publishing on the history of art and photography in post-apartheid South Africa, including curating exhibitions on this subject (including Land Marks/Home Lands: Contemporary Art from South Africa at the Haunch of Venison Gallery in London in 2008). Garb's exhibition Figures and Fictions was nominated for a Lucie award in Curating.

== Education and career ==
Garb was born in Israel in 1956.

She attended the Michaelis School of Fine Art, at the University of Cape Town, receiving a BA in Art in 1978. Moving to London soon after, she received her MA in 1982, and her PhD in 1991, both in Art History, from the Courtauld Institute of Art.

She worked at the Courtauld as lecturer from 1988 to 1989, and has taught at UCL since 1989, where she was promoted in 2001 to professor. In 2014 she was elected a Fellow of the British Academy the United Kingdom's national academy for the humanities and social sciences.

== Works ==
- Sisters of the Brush: Women’s Artistic Culture in Late Nineteenth Century Paris (New Haven and London: Yale University Press, 1994)
- Bodies of Modernity, Figure and Flesh in Fin de Siècle France (London: Thames & Hudson, 1998)
- The Unquiet Image: The Paintings of Vivienne Koorland (Irma Stern Museum, University of Cape Town, 1998)
- The Painted Face: Portraits of Women in France 1814–1914 (New Haven and London: Yale University Press, 2007)
- The Body in Time; Figures of Femininity in Late Nineteenth-Century France (University of Washington Press, 2008)
- Home Lands – Land Marks; Contemporary Art from South Africa (London: Haunch of Venison, 2008)
- Figures and Fictions: Contemporary South African Photography (London: Victoria & Albert Museum, 2011)
