= The Milk of Dreams =

Art exhibition in Venice, Italy

The Milk of Dreams is the main art exhibition of the 2022 Venice Biennale.
