= Mikhael Subotzky =

South African artist (born 1981)

Mikhael Subotzky (born 1981 in Cape Town) is a South African artist based in Johannesburg. He works across photography, film, video installation, painting and a collage technique he calls the sticky-tape transfer. He is a member of Magnum Photos. Ponte City, made with Patrick Waterhouse, won the 2015 Deutsche Börse Photography Prize and was acquired by the San Francisco Museum of Modern Art in 2018. His work is in the collections of the Museum of Modern Art, SFMOMA, Tate and the Centre Pompidou, among others.

== Life and work ==
Subotzky graduated from the Michaelis School of Fine Art at the University of Cape Town in 2004.

His first body of work Die Vier Hoeke (The Four Corners) is an exploration of the prison system in South Africa.

For his book Beaufort West, Subotzky photographed in and around a prison built within a traffic circle in the town of Beaufort West.

For six years he and Patrick Waterhouse collaborated in photographing in Ponte City, a 54-storey cylindrical building in Johannesburg – the tallest residential tower block in Africa – resulting in their book and exhibition Ponte City. They photographed the residents, interiors and exteriors of the building, and produced a series of giant tableaux, made up of hundreds of photographs, presented in towering light boxes. Their book Ponte City won the Deutsche Börse Photography Prize 2015.

Subotzky became a Magnum Photos nominee in 2007 and a full member in 2011.

== Publications ==
- Beaufort West. With an essay by Jonny Steinberg.
  - London: Chris Boot, 2008. ISBN 9781905712113.
  - London: Chris Boot, 2014. ISBN 9781905712113. Special edition.
- Retinal Shift. Göttingen: Steidl, 2012. ISBN 9783869305394. Edited by Ivan Vladislavic, texts by Anthea Buys and Sean O'Toole. Catalogue for his Standard Bank Young Artist Exhibition.
- Mikhael Subotzky: photographe = photographer. Montreuil: l'Oeil, 2007. ISBN 9782351370391. Text in English and French.

== Publications with others ==
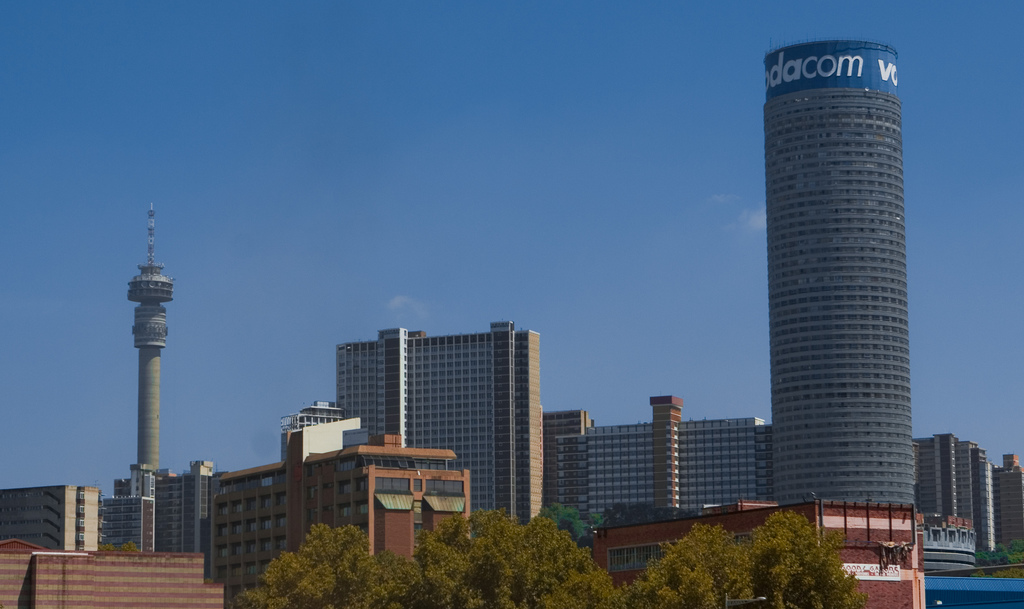
Ponte City, Johannesburg

- Ponte City. Göttingen: Steidl, 2014. ISBN 9783869307503. With Patrick Waterhouse, edited by Ivan Vladislavic. Catalog of an exhibition held at Le Bal, Paris and Fotomuseum Antwerp, Belgium in 2014.
- Vos Reves Nous Derangent. Paris: Actes Sud, 2013. ISBN 978-2330022204. Photographs by Subotzky, Dulce Pinzon and Achinto Bhadra, texts by Mathieu Potte-Bonneville and Bertrand Ogilvie; includes text in English by Fred Ritchin translated into French by Sally Laruelle.

== Exhibitions ==
- 2005: Die Vier Hoeke = The Four Corners, Pollsmoor Prison, Cape Town, South Africa.
- 2008: New Photography: Josephine Meckseper and Mikhael Subotzky, Museum of Modern Art, New York. With Josephine Meckseper.
- 2009: Still Revolution: Suspended in Time, Museum of Contemporary Canadian Art, Toronto, May–June 2009. Group exhibition with Subotzky, Barbara Astman, Walead Beshty, Mat Collishaw, Stan Douglas, Idris Khan, Trevor Paglen, and Martha Rosler.
- 2010: 12th Cairo Biennale (group)
- 2011: Figures & Fictions: Contemporary South African Photography, Victoria and Albert Museum, London. Group exhibition.
- 2012: Retinal Shift, Standard Bank Young Artist 2012, Iziko South African Museum.
- 2012: Liverpool Biennial (group)
- 2013: Rencontres Picha, Lubumbashi (group)
- 2014: Ponte City, Le Bal, Paris, January–April 2014. With Patrick Waterhouse.
- 2015: All the World's Futures, 56th Venice Biennale (group)
- 2016: WYE, Sherman Contemporary Art Foundation, Sydney
- 2021: Tell It To The Mountains, with Lindokuhle Sobekwa, A4 Arts Foundation, Cape Town
- 2022: Epilogue, Goodman Gallery, London
- 2024: Home Building Ideas for South Africa (or A Cape Town Landscape), Goodman Gallery, Cape Town
- 2024: The Struggle of Memory, Palais Populaire, Berlin (group)
- 2024: Fragile Beauty: Photographs from the Sir Elton John and David Furnish Collection, Victoria and Albert Museum, London (group)
- 2025–26: View Finding: Selections from The Walther Collection, Metropolitan Museum of Art, New York (group, with Patrick Waterhouse)
- 2026: Ponte City Book Box Project, with Patrick Waterhouse, A4 Arts Foundation, Cape Town
- 2026: A Johannesburg Landscape (or Thirteen Tons Settled to Brick), Goodman Gallery, Johannesburg
- 2027: Ponte City: Mikhael Subotzky and Patrick Waterhouse, San Francisco Museum of Modern Art

== Awards ==
- 2007: Young Photographer category, Ville de Perpignan Rémi Ochlik award, Visa pour l'image, Perpignan.
- 2007: KLM Paul Huf Award, Foam Fotografiemuseum Amsterdam, Amsterdam.
- 2008: W. Eugene Smith Grant from the W. Eugene Smith Memorial Fund.
- 2009: Oskar Barnack Award for Beaufort West.
- 2011: Discovery Award, Rencontres d'Arles, with Patrick Waterhouse, for Ponte City.
- 2015: Deutsche Börse Photography Prize 2015, with Patrick Waterhouse, for Ponte City.

== Collections ==
Subotzky's work is held in the following permanent collections:

- Centre Pompidou, Paris: 2 prints and an ensemble de 60 photographs (as of 8 January 2025)
- Iziko South African National Gallery, Cape Town: 2 works (as of 8 January 2025)
- Museum of Modern Art, New York: 7 prints (as of 8 January 2025)
