= Irma Stern Museum =

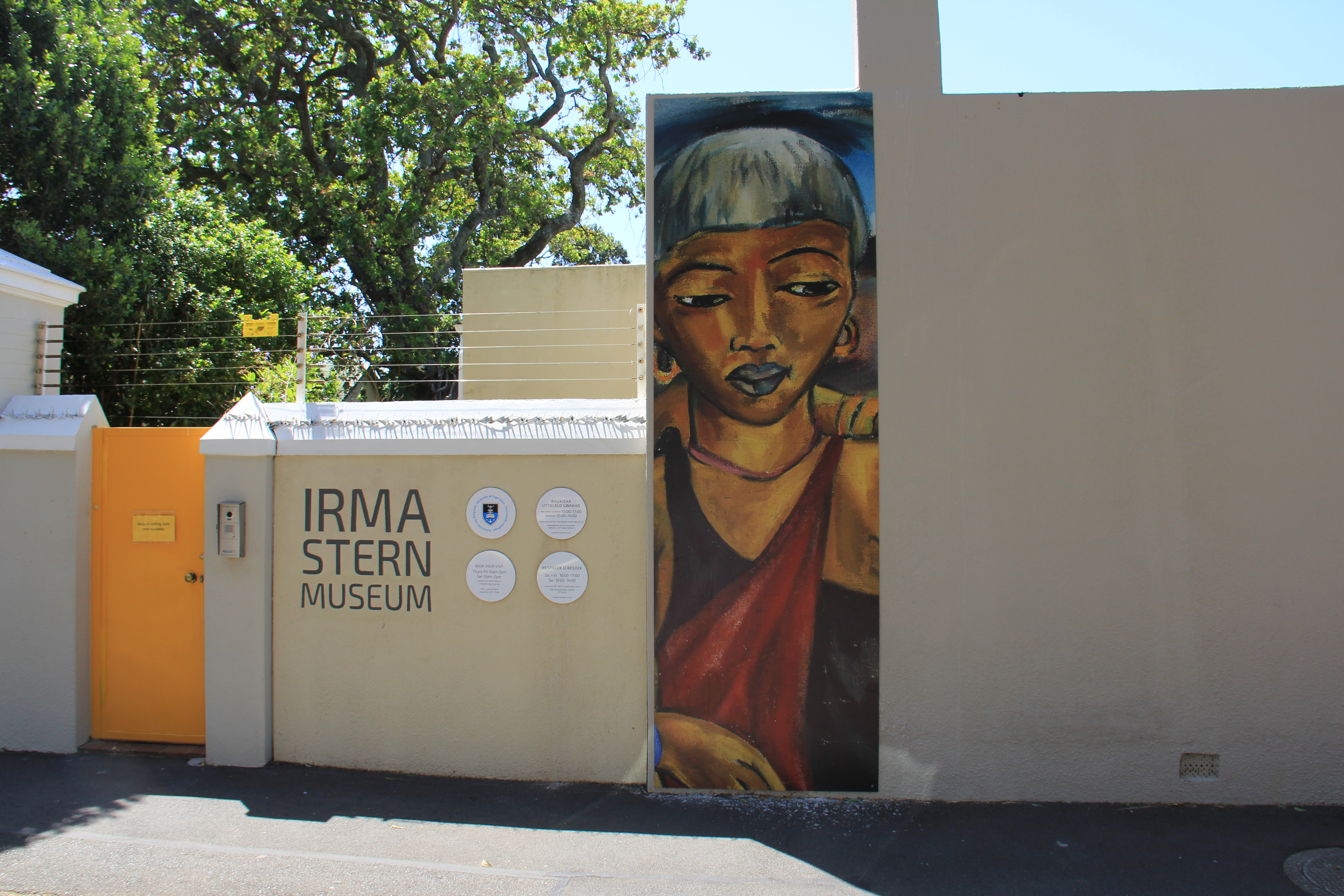
- Established: 1972
- Dissolved: 31 October 2025
- Location: 21 Cecil Road, Rosebank, Cape Town
- Coordinates: 33.95276°S 18.469421°E
- Type: Art Museum
- Website: irmasternmuseum.co.za

The Irma Stern Museum was a South African museum dedicated to the life and work of Irma Stern and the artists associated with her.

== History ==
The Irma Stern Museum was founded in July 1972 and housed in Irma's home known as "The Firs" in Rosebank, Cape Town. In her will, Irma Stern bequeathed her collections to a trust fund for the advancement and promotion of the Fine Arts. This was the basis for the museum's creation, so that these collections contribute to the advancement of the arts. Some rooms in the museum remained largely as Irma would have wanted them, including her studio where her brushes, easel, rags and painting coat are kept, just as she left them.

Other rooms hosted temporary exhibitions, such as those for Jo Ractliffe (1998), Esther Mahlangu (2003 and 2015) and Georgina Gratrix in 2021, drawing on the Irma Stern Museum's funds to highlight and interact with art and culture.

== Funding and closure ==
In June 2022, the Irma Stern Trust offered 124 works from its collection in Irma Stern: Time | Line, a single-artist auction held by Strauss & Co in Welgemeend, Cape Town. According to the auction house, the proceeds were intended to preserve the collection and make it more accessible, including by developing the trust's website as a research resource. The Art Newspaper reported that the sale raised around R22 million (almost US$1.3 million), which it said was intended for the museum's preservation.

In October 2025, the University of Cape Town and the Irma Stern Trust announced the end of their partnership, and the museum closed at the end of that month. The university cited operational reasons. The trust said that a 2023 architectural assessment had found the building did not meet museum-grade requirements, and that it was seeking to reacquire The Firs from the university. The closure prompted public criticism, including a petition calling for openness and accountability, and the trust moved the collection to a storage facility at the V&A Waterfront.

Responding to claims of mismanagement, the trust said it had reinvested the proceeds of the 2022 sale in its operations, including insurance, maintenance, and storage of the collection, as well as in investments to support future programs. In February 2026, the Norval Foundation opened the first of a four-part exhibition series drawn from the trust's collection, to run while the trust arranges a new permanent home for the works.

== Owners ==
The Irma Stern Museum, established under Irma Stern's will, has a collection owned by the Irma Stern Trust, while the museum is administered by the University of Cape Town on behalf of the Trustees of the Irma Stern Trust.

== Garden ==
Nicknamed "The Secret Garden," The Garden is an oasis on the University of Cape Town campus. Students, staff, and visitors are invited to hold meetings amidst the lush plants and flowers. The garden features Magnolia grandiflora at the northern end of the garden, and Norfolk Island pine at the southern end, surrounded by Phoenix Reclinata.

== The Museum ==
Little known during her lifetime, she left a rich heritage of art preserved in her home in Cape Town, which contains her own collection and objects acquired during her travels in Europe and Africa. The museum regularly hosted exhibitions of contemporary South African artists.

== See also ==
- Johannesburg Art Gallery
- Musée Picasso
