= Patrick Waterhouse =

British artist

- Waterhouse in 2023
- Born: 13/08/1981; Britain
- Education: Camberwell College of Arts
- Known for: Photography, installation art
- Notable work: Ponte City, Restricted Images, Revisions
- Awards: Discovery Award, Rencontres d’Arles (2011); Deutsche Börse Photography Prize (2015)
- Website: patrickwaterhouse.com

Patrick Waterhouse (born 13 August 1981) is a British artist whose practice combines photography with found and archival material, often through long-term projects concerned with how places, histories and people are represented.

Waterhouse has received the Discovery Award at the Rencontres d'Arles and the Deutsche Börse Photography Prize for Ponte City, made with Mikhael Subotzky. His other works include Restricted Images and Revisions, developed through a long-term collaboration with Warlpiri artists in Central Australia. His work is held in collections including the Metropolitan Museum of Art, Centre Pompidou, and San Francisco Museum of Modern Art.

== Life and work ==
Waterhouse graduated from Camberwell College of Arts in London in 2003. In 2007, he received a scholarship to Fabrica in Treviso, Italy, where he met South African artist Mikhael Subotzky. Waterhouse began Ponte City with Subotzky that year, starting a long-term collaboration centred on the 54-storey residential tower in Johannesburg.

Waterhouse and Subotzky photographed the building and its residents, systematically recording every door, window and television screen, while assembling an archive of photographs, documents and other material found in abandoned apartments. Writing in The Guardian, Sean O'Hagan described Ponte City as a work of "obsessive determination" that pushed at the boundaries of photography. The project received the Discovery Award at the Rencontres d'Arles in 2011 and was published by Steidl in 2014. In 2015, Waterhouse and Subotzky received the Deutsche Börse Photography Prize.

From 2011 to 2015, Waterhouse was editor-in-chief of Colors magazine, where he developed the Colors Survival Guides. Writing about this period, magCulture described the new editorial direction as "a series with an interlinking narrative structure", reflecting the interconnectedness and complexity of its subjects. Jeremy Leslie later credited Waterhouse with having "revitalised" the magazine through a new visual approach and guidebook-like format.

In 2011, Waterhouse began photographing in Central Australia and researching historical representations of Aboriginal Australia, assembling an archive of photographs, maps, illustrations, books and other documents. In 2014, he began working with Warlpiri artists through Warlukurlangu Artists in Yuendumu and Nyirripi.

The first body of work from the collaboration to be published was Restricted Images. Photographs made by Waterhouse were returned to the people depicted and their relatives, who painted directly onto the prints, obscuring and altering the images. Writing in The Saturday Paper, Michael Winkler described the interventions as making the Warlpiri participants simultaneously present and absent, "both the subject and the co-author of the image." Restricted Images: Made with the Warlpiri of Central Australia was published by SPBH Editions in 2018.

The broader collaboration became Revisions, involving more than 60 Warlpiri artists and drawing on the historical archive Waterhouse had assembled, including maps, photographs, illustrations, flags and other records. Writing in Foam, curator Marc Feustel described Waterhouse bringing the archive to Warlukurlangu Artists "in order to start a conversation around this problematic history of representation", which developed into a collaboration in which Warlpiri artists painted over documents from the archive. The Rautenstrauch-Joest-Museum described the resulting work as addressing omissions in the historical record and giving voice to stories passed down by the original custodians of the land.

In 2023, Revisions was exhibited at the Rautenstrauch-Joest-Museum in Cologne. The exhibition included The True Story, a two-channel video installation narrated by members of the Warlpiri community that juxtaposes Warlpiri accounts of Australian history with European archival material, photographs and film. Writing in The Saturday Paper, Winkler described its parallel screens as "mirroring the contrasts between Warlpiri and non-Indigenous ways of seeing."

In 2024-25, Waterhouse presented Standard Deviation at A4 Arts Foundation in Cape Town, bringing together works concerned with repetition, copying and the transmission of information. These included The Unknown Masterpiece (2022), a sequence of paintings made in Chongqing through successive acts of copying.

== Publications ==
- L’Inferno di Dante Luna Storia Naturale. Milan: Mondadori, Strade Blu, 2010. Illustrations by Patrick Waterhouse; notes by Walter Hutton.
- Ponte City. With Mikhael Subotzky. Göttingen: Steidl; The Walther Collection. Edited by Ivan Vladislavic.
- Restricted Images: Made with the Warlpiri of Central Australia. London: SPBH Editions, 2018.
- The Unknown Masterpiece. Cape Town: A4 Arts Foundation, 2025.

=== Colors magazine ===
- Colors 81: Transport – a Survival Guide. Hong Kong: IdN Magazine; Treviso, Italy: Fabrica, 2011.
- Colors 82: Shit – a Survival Guide. Hong Kong: IdN Magazine; Treviso, Italy: Fabrica, 2011.
- Colors 83: Happiness – a Survival Guide. Hong Kong: IdN Magazine; Treviso, Italy: Fabrica, 2012.
- Colors 84: Apocalypse – a Survival Guide. Hong Kong: IdN Magazine; Treviso, Italy: Fabrica, 2012.
- Colors 85: Going to Market – a Survival Guide. Hong Kong: IdN Magazine; Treviso, Italy: Fabrica, 2012.
- Colors 86: Making the News – a Survival Guide. Hong Kong: IdN Magazine; Treviso, Italy: Fabrica, 2013.
- Colors 87: Looking at Art – a Survival Guide. Hong Kong: IdN Magazine; Treviso, Italy: Fabrica, 2013.
- Colors 88: Protest – a Survival Guide. Hong Kong: IdN Magazine; Treviso, Italy: Fabrica, 2013.
- Colors 89: Moving House – a Survival Guide. Hong Kong: IdN Magazine; Treviso, Italy: Fabrica, 2014.
- Colors 90: Football – a Survival Guide. Hong Kong: IdN Magazine; Treviso, Italy: Fabrica, 2014.

== Awards ==
In 2011, Waterhouse won the Discovery Award at the Les Rencontres d'Arles for Ponte City with Mikhael Subotzky.

In 2015, Waterhouse and Subotzky won the Deutsche Börse Photography Prize for their publication Ponte City. They were shortlisted alongside Nikolai Bakharev, Zanele Muholi and Viviane Sassen.

In 2023, the exhibition Revisions at Rautenstrauch-Joest-Museum in Cologne was nominated for the Kölner Kulturpreis in the category Kulturereignis des Jahres (Cultural Event of the Year).

In 2024, Making Revisions, a short documentary about the collaboration behind Revisions and the workshops Waterhouse ran with Warlpiri communities to develop and curate the exhibition, won Best Australian Short Documentary at the Melbourne Documentary Film Festival. It also received Best Cinematography in Non-Fiction at the Catchlight Film Festival.

== Selected Exhibitions ==
- 2010 - In Context, South African National Gallery, Cape Town
- 2012 - The Unexpected Guest, Liverpool Biennial, Liverpool
- 2013 - A Different Kind of Order: The ICP Triennial, International Center of Photography, New York.
- 2014 - Ponte City, with Mikhael Subotzky, Le Bal, Paris; FOMU, Antwerp
- 2014-15 - Ponte City, With Mikhael Subotzky, Scottish National Portrait Gallery, National Galleries of Scotland, Edinburgh.
- 2019 - Restricted Images: Made with the Warlpiri of Central Australia, FOMU, Antwerp
- 2023-24 - Revisions, Rautenstrauch-Joest-Museum, Cologne
- 2024-25 - Standard Deviation, A4 Arts Foundation, Cape Town
- 2025-26 - View Finding: Selections from The Walther Collection, Metropolitan Museum of Art, New York

== Selected Collections ==
- Metropolitan Museum of Art, New York
- Centre Pompidou, Paris
- San Francisco Museum of Modern Art, San Francisco
- National Gallery of Art, Washington, D.C
- FOMU – Fotomuseum Antwerpen, Antwerp
- Rautenstrauch-Joest-Museum, Cologne
