= Herzekiah Andrew Shanu =

Nigerian photographer (1858 – 1905)

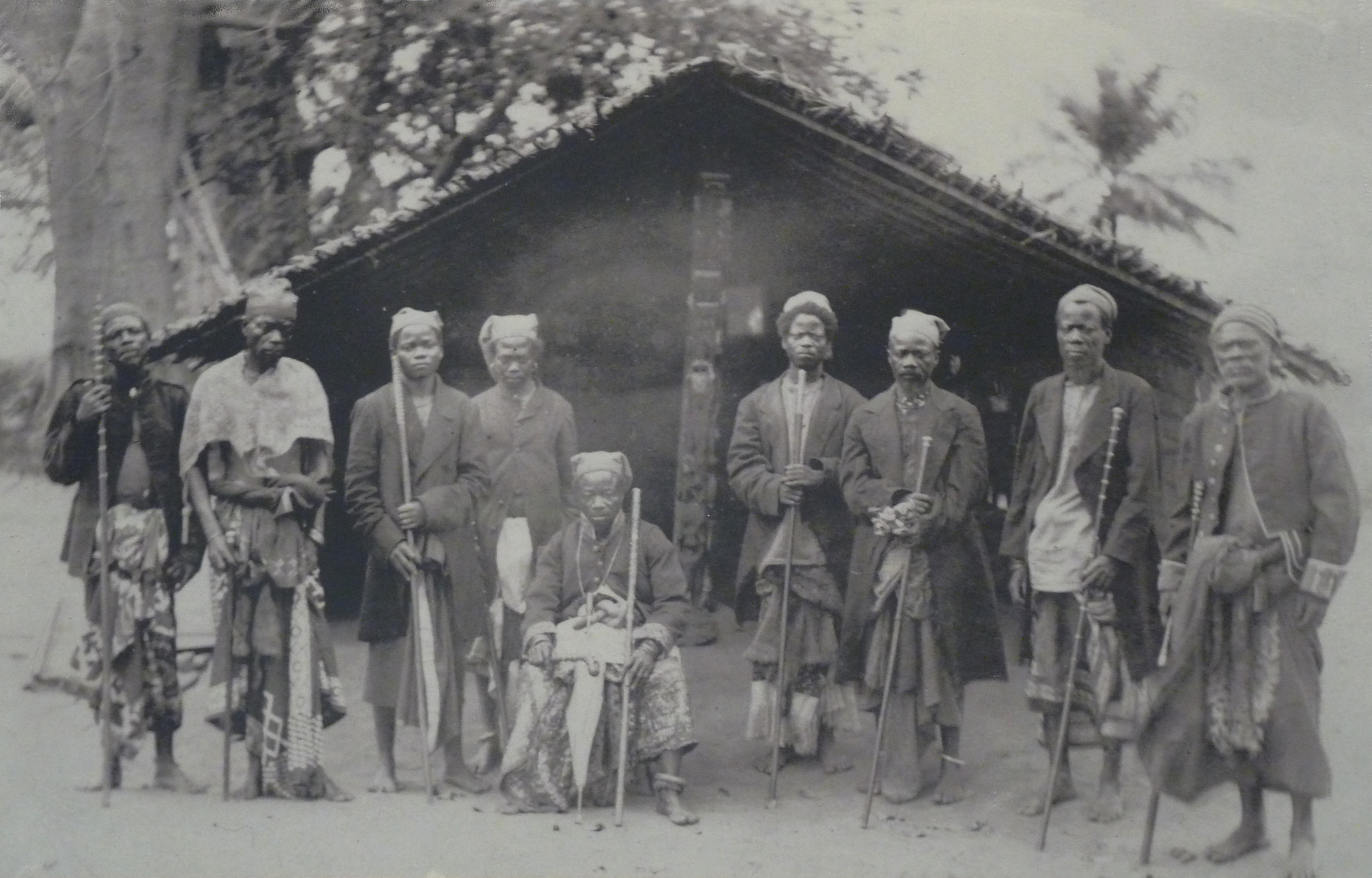
- The Nine Kings of Boma, Congo Free State, c. 1890, halftone. A photograph by Shanu published in Le Congo illustré 1/19 (1892), p. 149.
- Born: 1858; Lagos (modern-day Nigeria)
- Died: 1905 (aged 46–47); Boma, Congo Free State
- Known for: 19-th century photography in West Africa

Herzekiah Andrew Shanu (1858 – July 1905) was a 19th-century Nigerian photographer born in Lagos, modern-day Nigeria. In the Congo Free State he later operated a photography studio in the then-capital Boma and was active in a campaign against abuses by Belgian authorities.

== Early years ==
Shanu was a Yoruba man, originally from Lagos in what is now Nigeria. He was educated at the Church Missionary Society Grammar School, and later in the Training Institute for Teachers, at the end of which he graduated as a teacher. For a few years, he taught at a Lagos Primary School. In 1884, he entered the colonial service of the Congo Free State as a clerk, eventually rising to the rank of district sub-commissioner, serving as a French to English translator in the office of the governor-general in Boma. Establishing himself in Boma, then the capital, he then opened a general store and photographic studio. In 1894, he traveled to Antwerp to attend the Exposition Internationale d'Anvers. Some of his photographs were published in Le Congo illustré. In 1900, he demonstrated his loyalty to the Congo Free State by supporting the authorities during a mutiny by the Force Publique.

== Activism ==
In 1903, Shanu supplied Roger Casement with information concerning the abuse of West African workers in the Congo, who in turn referred him to E. D. Morel. Morel and Shanu exchanged messages for several years; Shanu forwarding, among other things, transcripts of trials against low-ranking Congo Free State officials which proved to be revealing. While trying to acquire information from the police chief of Boma, Shanu was found out and as a consequence beleaguered by government officials. After it was discovered that Shanu had provided the Congo Reform Association with evidence of atrocities in Congo, government employees were ordered to boycott his businesses. He suffered bankruptcy and committed suicide in July 1905.^{[page needed]}

== See also ==
- Augustus Washington
- John Parkes Decker
- Francis W. Joaque
- Lutterodt photographers
- Neils Walwin Holm
- J. A. Green (photographer)
- Alex Agbaglo Acolatse

== Literature ==
- Christraud M. Geary, In and Out of Focus: Images from Central Africa, 1885–1960. London: Philip Wilson for Palgrave Macmillan, 2002, pp. 104–106.
- "Kinshasa Photographers, 1870 to 2000", Revue Noire, 2001. ISBN 2-909571-53-X.
