= Alphonso Lisk-Carew =

Sierra Leonean photographer (1887–1969)

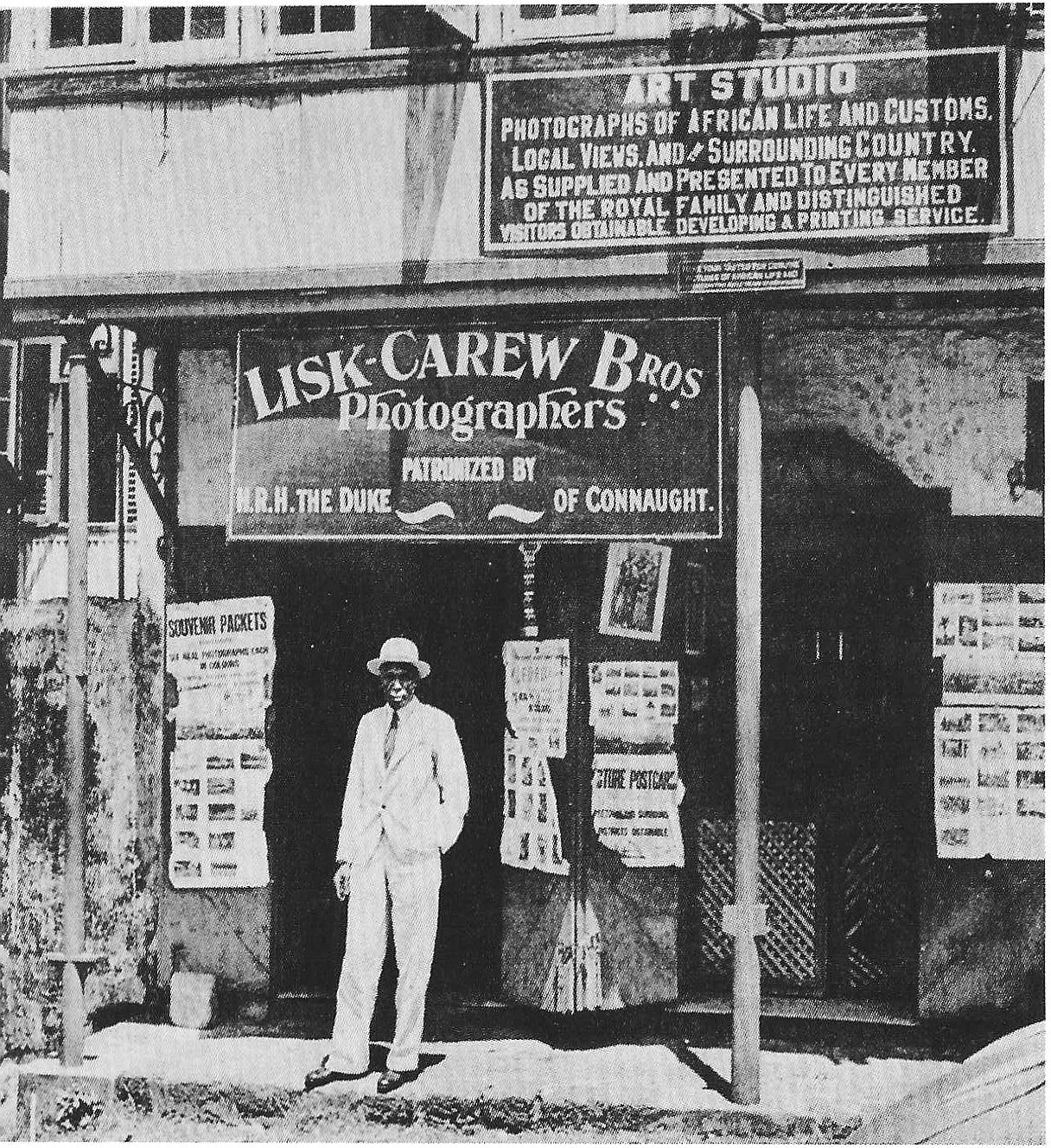
- Studio of Lisk-Carew Bros., Freetown, c. 1938
- Born: Alphonso Silvester Lisk-Carew; 1883
- Died: 1969 (aged 81–82)
- Known for: Portraits and documentary photography of early 20th-century Sierra Leone

Alphonso Sylvester Lisk-Carew (1883–1969) was a Sierra Leonean photographer, active from around 1905 to the 1960s. Alphonso and his brother Arthur operated a photographic studio in Freetown, advertising as the "Lisk-Carew Brothers Photographers". Over their long career, extending through the first half of the 20th century, the Lisk-Carew brothers produced a large collection of photographs documenting life in Sierra Leone during the colonial era.

Photographs by Lisk-Carew are held in some major public collections in Europe and the US. Among other early historical images from West Africa, a group portrait of three young African women by Lisk-Carew was presented by the Metropolitan Museum of Art in their 2015 exhibition and catalogue In and Out of the Studio: Photographic Portraits from West Africa.

== Life and work ==
Alphonso Lisk-Carew had trained in the studio of the African photographer William Stephen Johnston, who operated his business from 1893 in Freetown. In 1905, Lisk-Carew established a photography studio in Freetown, in the British Sierra Leone Protectorate, with his brother Arthur as manager from 1911 onwards. They ran a large two-storey studio in the city. The brothers advertised themselves as photographers and printers, listing their business address as 3 East Brook Lane at the corner of Westmoreland and Gloucester Streets.

The Lisk-Carews catered to both the Creole and European communities of Freetown. Their portrait style followed Victorian conventions, with sitters posed formally before the customary painted backdrop, but also sometimes photographed on verandas or in garden settings. These studio portraits and other images of social events were commonly reproduced as picture postcards for customers, including the emerging tourist market. According to cultural anthropologist Christraud M. Geary, the Lisk-Carews created hundreds of photographs and some real photo postcards, with portraits, urban and rural scenes as well as documentary images of Africans. Many of their early photographs were albumen prints made with a standard 8 x 10-inch view camera. For pictures of the Freetown harbour and landscapes, Lisk-Carew also used a special panoramic camera.

In 1910, Alphonso and Arthur Lisk-Carew served as official photographers for the visit of the Duke of Connaught to Sierra Leone. A few years later, around 1912, the brothers made photographic expeditions into the interior of Sierra Leone and neighbouring The Gambia. In 1920, Lisk-Carew was invited along with other photographers to provide several images for The Red Book of West Africa. This business guide contained descriptions of prominent expatriate and African firms, as well as photographs and information on notable individuals involved in trade along the Anglophone West African coast between 1918 and 1920.

Also in 1920, an observer commented on the popularity of the Lisk-Carew's business, saying that no other studio in Freetown attracted more steamer passengers as the establishment run by the Lisk-Carew Brothers.

== Reception ==
=== Scholarship ===
Vera Viditz-Ward published 13 of Lisk-Carew's photographs in a 2011 article, with some of these from the Sierra Leone Museum collection and others from private collectors. Commenting on the history of photography in Freetown, Viditz-Ward saw Lisk-Carew's work as a transition between photographers of the 19th and 20th centuries. She further stated that the early period of photography in Freetown from 1850 until 1918 "formed the basis of a truly African photography [...] and still exists as a living tradition in modern Sierra Leone."

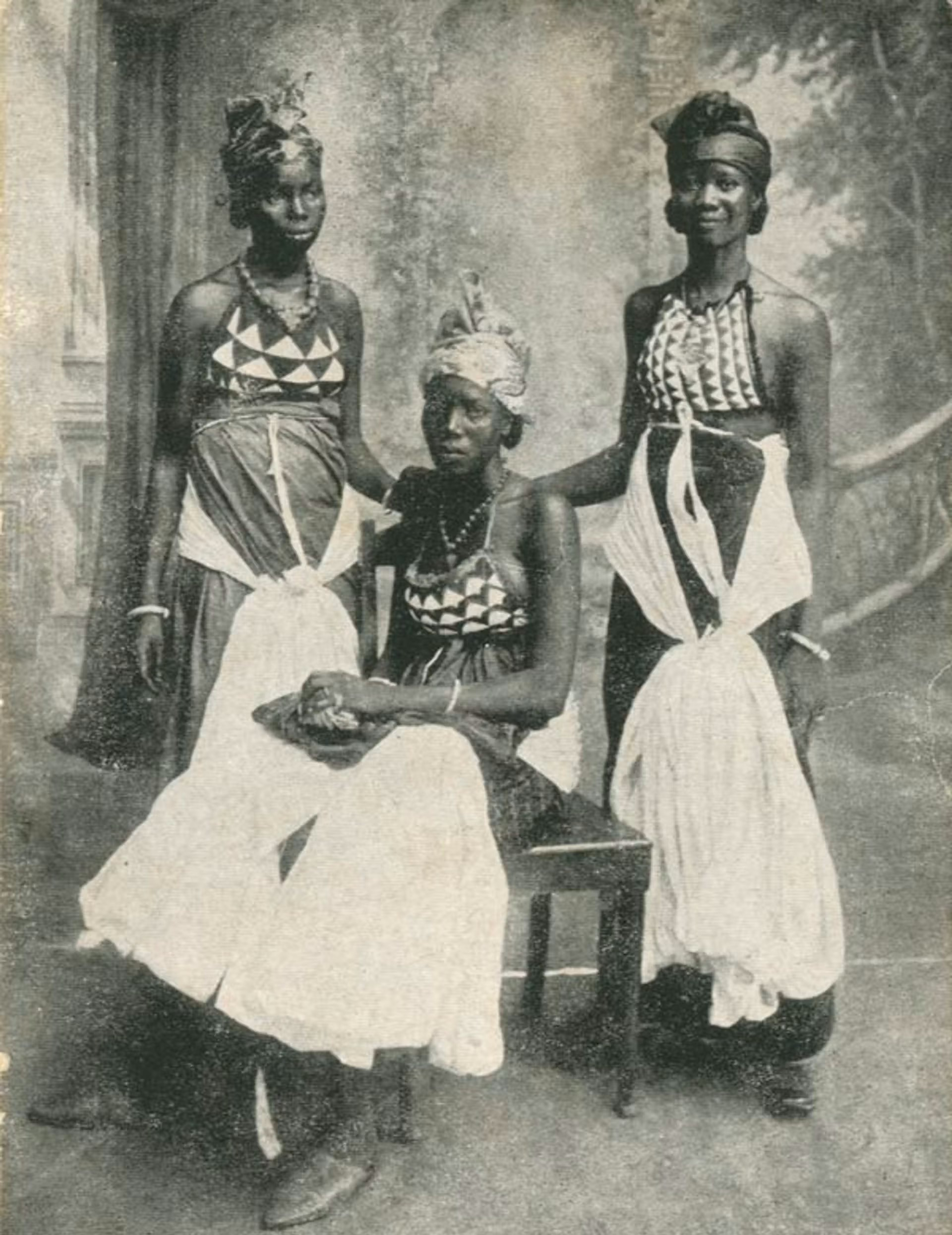
"Bundoo Girls, Sierra Leone", c. 1911.

In 2014, Julie Crooks, who later became head of the department of Arts of Global Africa and the Diaspora at the Art Gallery of Ontario, published her PhD thesis about Lisk-Carew and early photography in Sierra Leone. In her article accompanying the 2015 exhibition In and Out of the Studio: Photographic Portraits from West Africa at the Metropolitan Museum of Art, Crooks wrote about Lisk-Carew's visual records of the many changes in Sierra Leone, covering about 50 years of his work. Specifically, she called him "one amongst many early Sierra Leonean photographers who had a hand in shaping the country's history."

Focusing on a vintage reproduction of a group portrait with the historical caption "Bundoo Girls, Sierra Leone" and published by the Lisk-Carew Brothers around 1911, Crooks gave a detailed description of the three young women in the picture and the Bundu secret society they belonged to. In this studio portrait, the sitters were placed before a painted background in the style of the Victorian era. It shows various styles of Bundu clothing and accessories worn in the women's specific region of origin. Rather than mentioning ethnographic information that the Bundoo cultural society practiced female genital mutilation, Crooks wrote that "Lisk-Carew recognized the value of producing portraits in which the young women negotiated their authorship." A different, ethnographic photograph attributed to Lisk-Carew, originally titled "Bundu Girls and Devils", shows a group of young Bundu women of the Mende ethnic group after their initiation. Wearing similar accessories as seen in the studio portrait, they were photographed in an outdoor setting, accompanied by a traditional musician and a masked dancer.

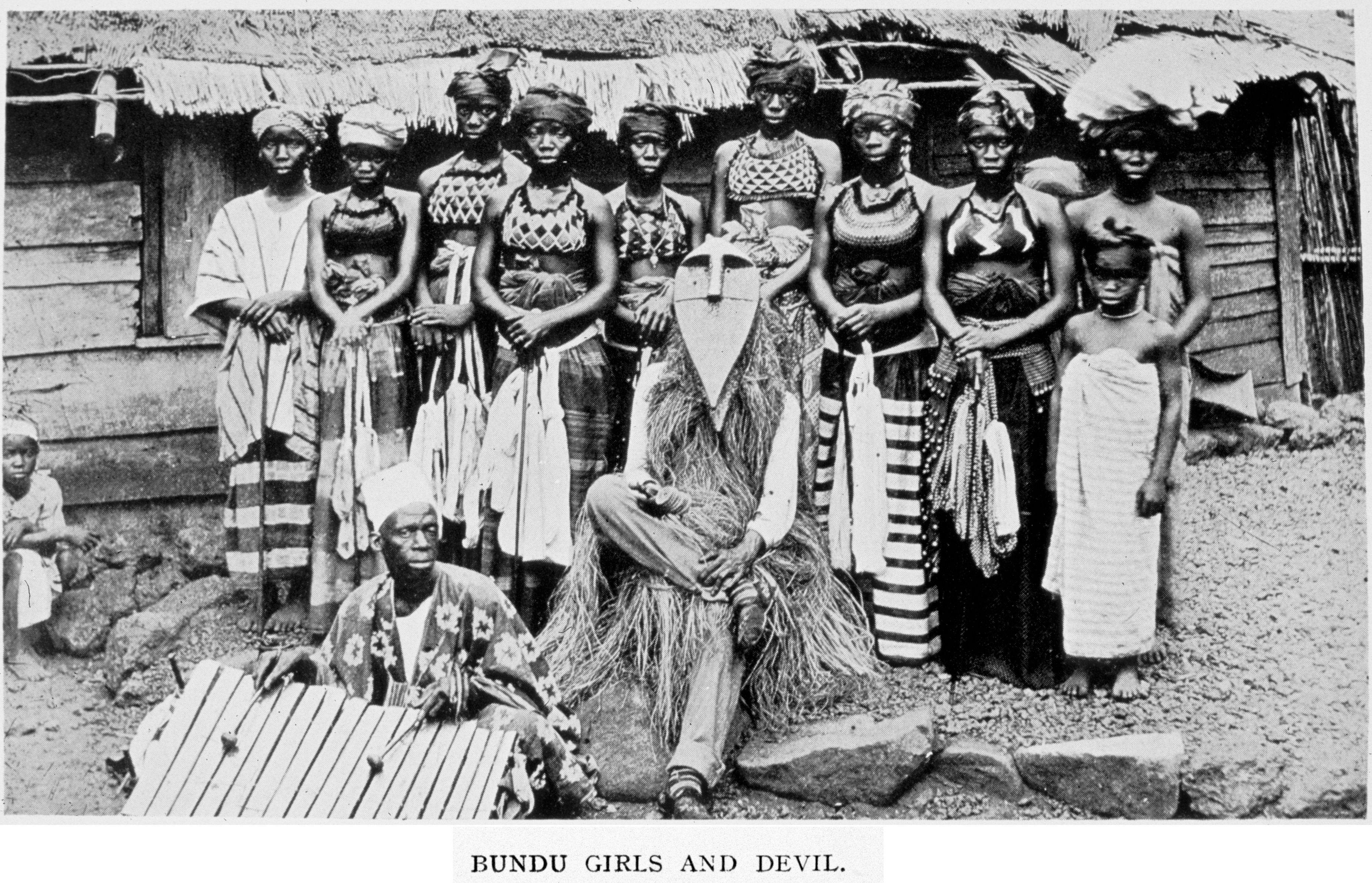
Documentary photograph of an initiation ceremony for girls of the Mende ethnic group

In her 2018 book Postcards from Africa: Photographers of the Colonial Era, Christraud M. Geary described the work of the Lisk-Carew brothers. The book includes a 1938 photograph showing Lisk-Carew standing before his studio and a portrait of an unidentified "Native Chief" in fancy clothes, taken about 1908. Referring to Lisk-Carew's visual legacy, Geary noted his "mastery of European conventions" in his portraits as well as his "modern documentary practices."

=== Collections ===
The Library of Congress catalogue lists 50 visual items by the Lisk-Carews in their African Postcard Collection. The Metropolitan Museum of Art holds the group portrait of three young women titled "Bundoo Girls, Sierra Leone". This image was shown as one of 80 images in the museum's 2015 exhibition and catalogue titled In and Out of the Studio: Photographic Portraits from West Africa. Further, the Melville J. Herskovits Library of African Studies at Northwestern University Libraries in Evanston, Illinois, holds a copy of The Red Book of West Africa, the Souvenir album of Freetown, as well as several photographs and postcards by the Lisk-Carew Brothers. The Ross Archive of African Images at Yale University Library also holds photographs by Lisk-Carew.

In the Netherlands, the African Studies Centre Leiden owns photographs by Lisk-Carew. Two of his historical photographs from the Christraud M. Geary Collection at the Rietberg Museum, Zurich, were included in their 2022 exhibition The Future is Blinking. Early Studio Photography from West and Central Africa.

== Selected works ==
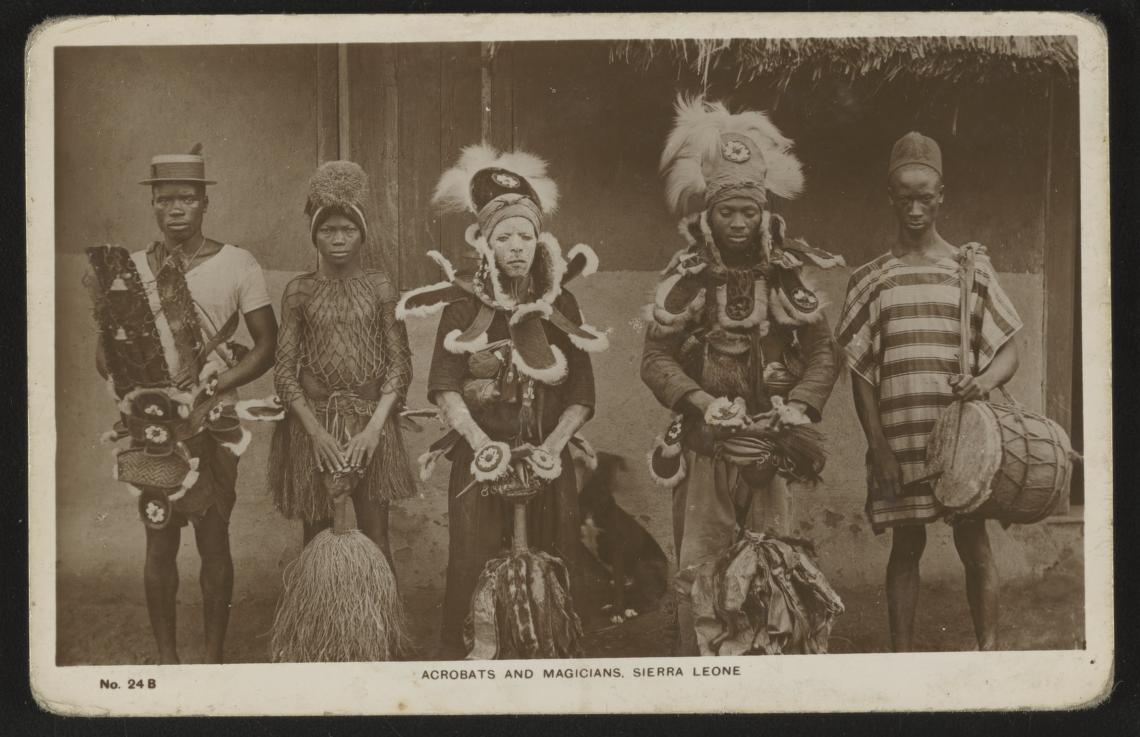
Postcard "Acrobats and Magicians"

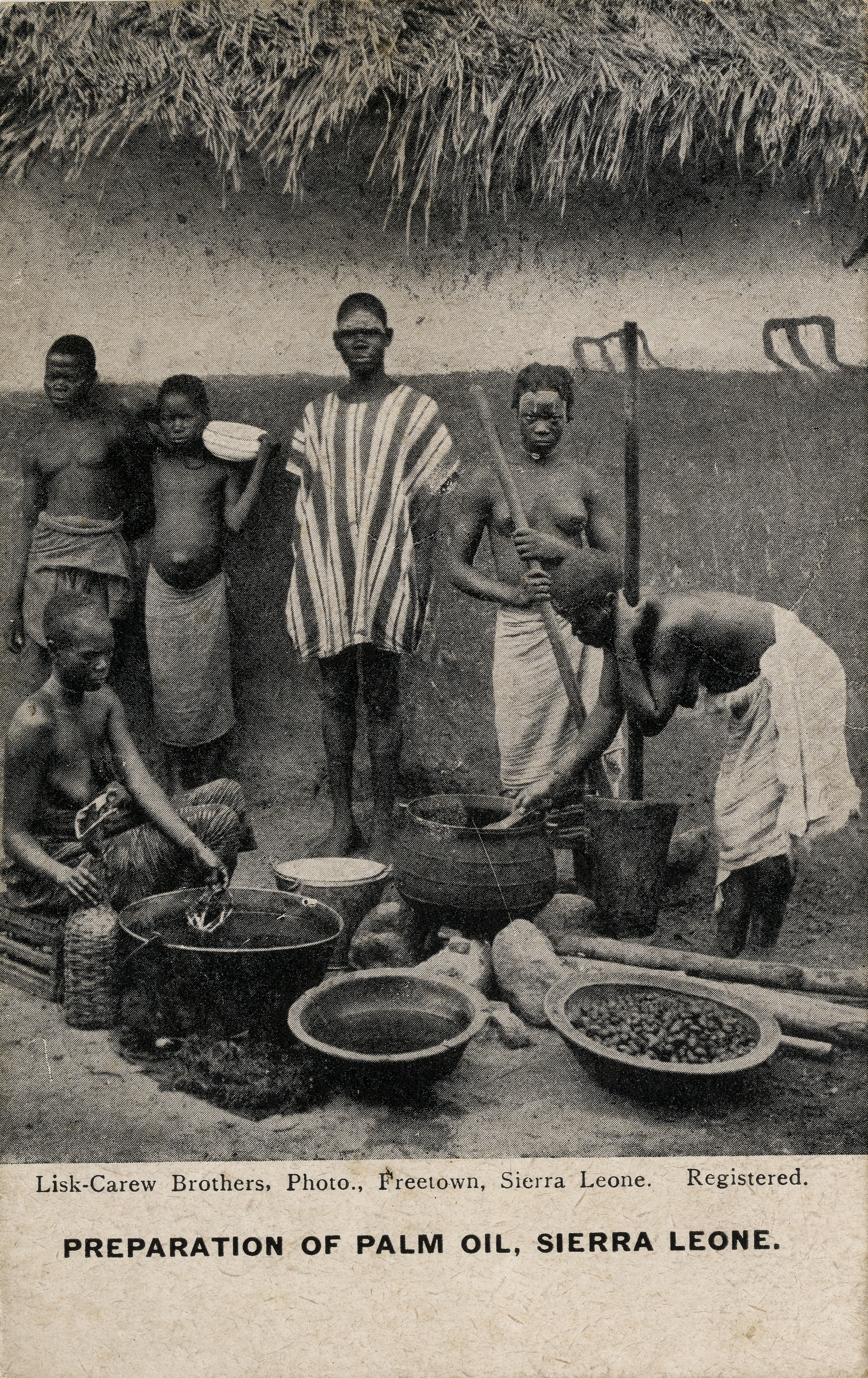
"Preparation of Palm Oil"

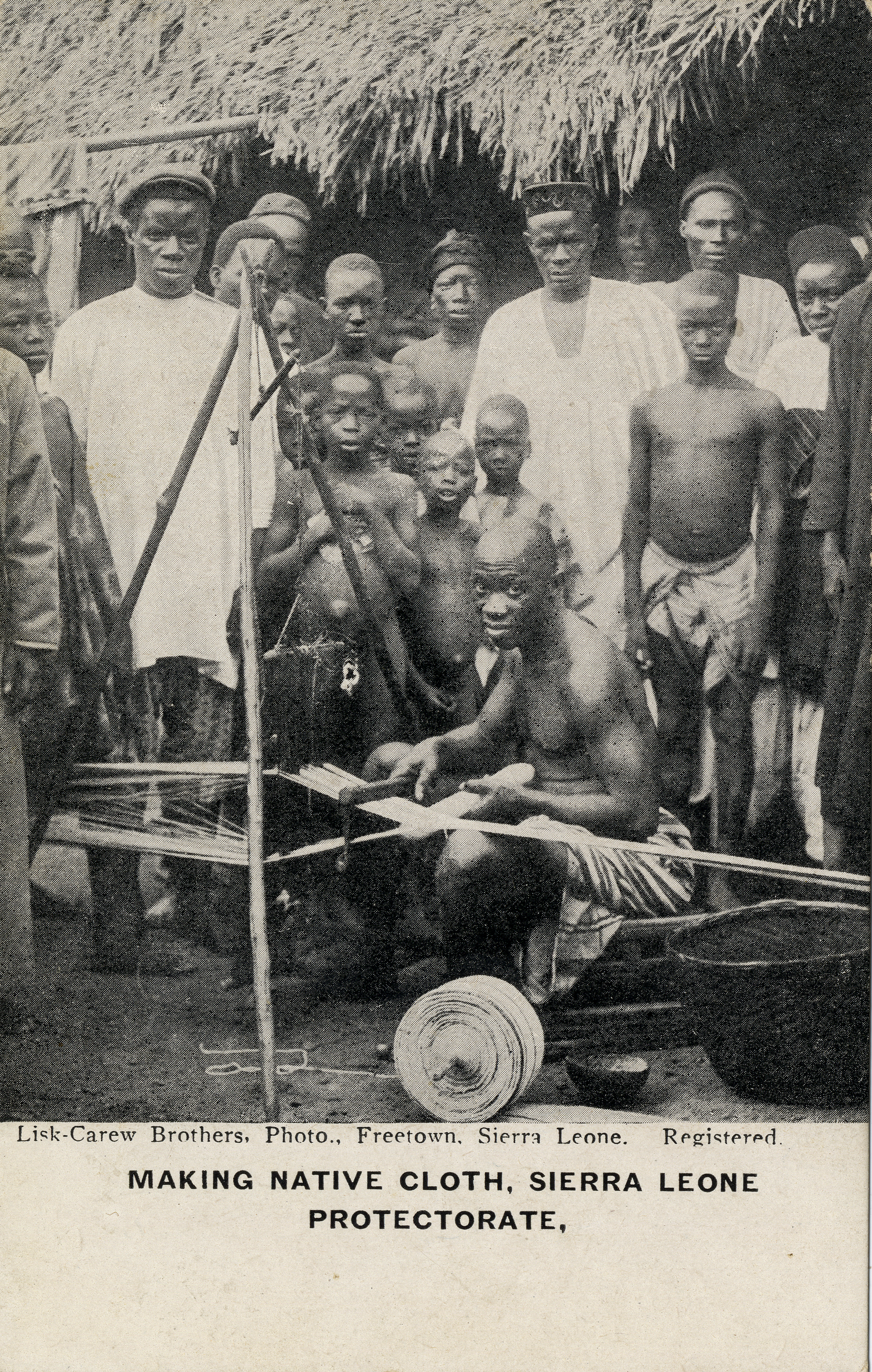
"Making Native Cloth"

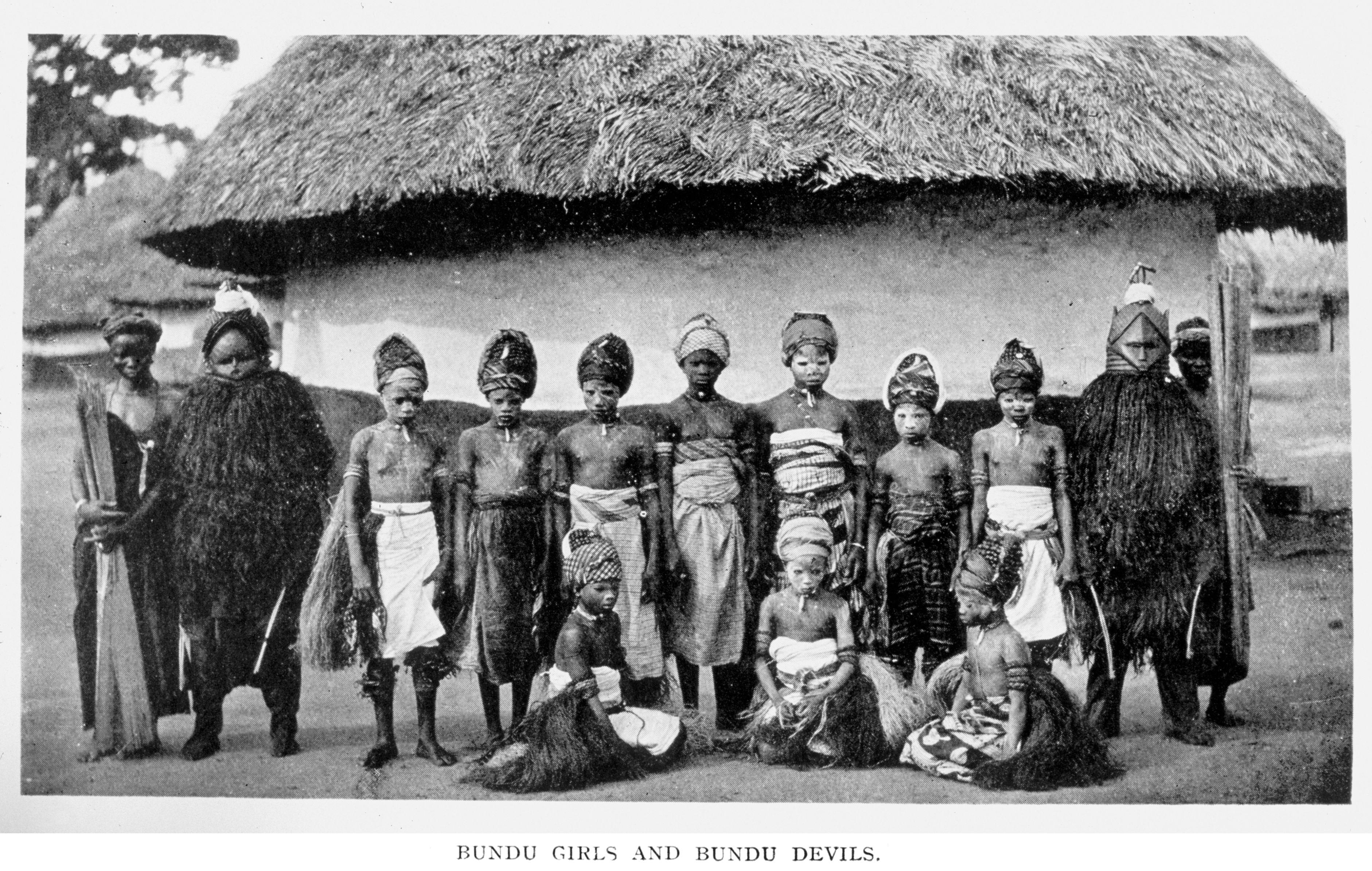
"Bundu Girls and Bundu Devils"

== Publications ==
- Souvenir album of Freetown by royal warrant to His Royal Highness The Duke of Connaught. Freetown, Sierra Leone. [n.d.] (Consisting of one folded leaf with illustrations; 11 x 16 cm)
- Postcards of Sierra Leone. Freetown, Sierra Leone. [19--?] (13 postcards: black and white ; 9 x 14 cm)

== See also ==
- Alex Agbaglo Acolatse
- George Da Costa
- John Parkes Decker
- J. A. Green
- Neils Walwin Holm
- Francis W. Joaque
- Lutterodt family
- Augustus Washington
