= Photography in Nigeria =

Photography in Nigeria began as a profession in the late nineteenth century, attracting practitioners from across West Africa. The professional prestige accorded to photography in Nigeria has led to the country being characterized as a 'photographic giant' in the region.

== The era of the studios ==
Daniel West (1815-1857), a Methodist pastor from Britain touring missionary congregations in West Africa, apparently took daguerrotypes in Abeokuta and Lagos in 1856, though only engravings survive. From 1880 onwards there were professional photographic studios in Lagos, often run by Sierra Leoneans, Liberians, or Brazilians in Nigeria. From the 1890s until 1910 Neils Walwin Holm, born in the Gold Coast, was "the pre-eminent photographer of Lagos". Other Nigerian photographic pioneers included H. S. Freeman (fl. 1925), Emmanuel Rockson, Alfred Mamattah, and George S. A. da Costa (1853-1929?). Outside Lagos, Jonathan Adagogo Green (1873-1905) studied photography in Sierra Leone before returning home to establish a studio in Bonny.

In the 1920s and 1930s Kriol Christian missionaries encouraged the spread of photography in Nigeria. In the 1930s Chief Solomon Osagie Alonge became the first official photographer for the royal court of Benin City. The National Professional Photographers Association (NPPA) was created in 1947. In the 1950s and 1960s the profession boomed, with prominent photographers such as Jackie Philips, Billyrose, and Sunmi Smart-Cole. Peter Obe (1932-2013), photojournalist for the Daily Times, won renown for his coverage of the Biafran Civil War.

The advent of colour in the 1970s initially boosted the small studios. However, in the 1980s large industrial companies, such as Agfa, established their own chains of printing and developing laboratories. Professional studios lost ground to 'freelance' photographers, though a Nigerian diaspora have maintained a reputation for photographic excellence in Ghana, Niger, Ivory Coast and Cameroon.

== Photography in Nigeria today ==
Yoruba photographic traditions continue to flourish, and there are clusters of shops selling photographic equipment in Alaba International Market and Lagos Island.

Yaba College of Technology in Lagos, and the Nigerian Institute of Journalism in Ibadan, provide training in photojournalism. The daily newspaper The Guardian employs a dozen salaried photojournalists, who file photographs along with their news reports. Photojournalists have sometimes suffered physical attacks in Nigeria. Nevertheless, they continue to have a significant reputation in the country. Terra Kulture held a retrospective exhibition of the work of veteran photojournalist Sunmi Smart-Cole in 2019. The 2021 death of Guardian photojournalist Najeem Raheem was widely mourned.
