= Lutterodt photographers =

Ghanaian photographers

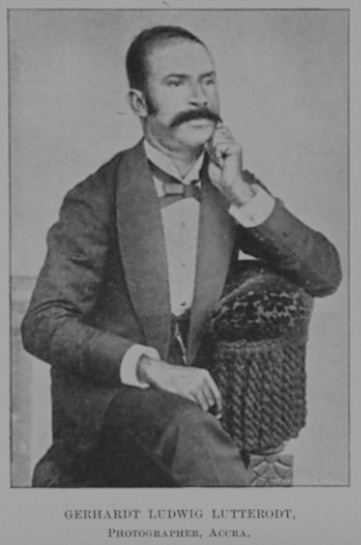
Studio portrait of Gerhardt Ludwig Lutterodt (born c. 1850)

The Lutterodt photographers, also known as Lutterodt family and Lutterodt and Son Studio, were a West African family of European and Ghanaian ancestry in the Gold Coast (modern-day Ghana) during the late 19th and first half of the 20th centuries. Considered pioneers of West African photography, their work is notable for its artistic quality and for documenting the social and cultural life of the region during that period.

Based on existing photographs and art historical research, the Lutterodt photographers have been mentioned as representatives of the few early African photographers, whose names and work are known. Prints of their historical photographs have been collected as examples of 19th-century African photography by the Metropolitan Museum of Art, the National Museum of African Art, the New York Public Library as well as by collections in Europe.

== History ==
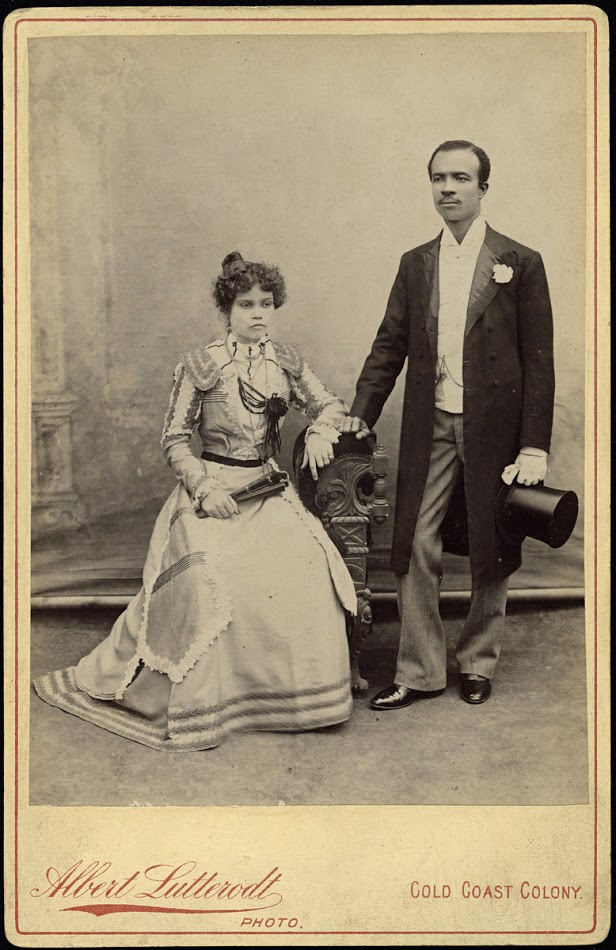
Cabinet card of Albert Lutterodt, presumably with Mrs. Evans-Lutterodt

The history of the Lutterodt family goes back to their mixed Danish and Ghanaian ancestry. The founder of a well-respected European-African family, Georg August Lutterodt (1790–c. 1851), was a Danish colonial official and planter whose wife was a member of the Ga people in Accra. Members of the Lutterodt family were among the earliest West African photographers, operating their own studio in Accra and traveling along the coast from the 1870s. The various family members ran their studio under names such as "Lutterodt Brothers" or "Lutterodt and Son", and in the 1920s, one of them owned Lutterodt Hall in Accra's Lutterodt Street.

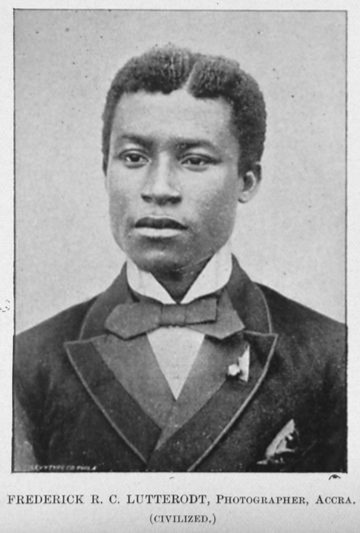
Studio portrait of Frederick R. C. Lutterodt (1871–1937)

Gerhardt Ludwig Lutterodt (born c. 1850), who was among the pioneers of photography in West Africa, and his brother George Lutterodt (1850/55–c. 1904) managed their photographic studio in Accra. Gerhardt Lutterodt also travelled between coastal cities from Freetown to Douala by steamship and became a well-known itinerant photographer in the region. During his travels, he not only served an elite clientele, but also trained local apprentices. One of these, Alex Agbaglo Acolatse (1880–1975), opened his own studio around 1900 in neighbouring German West Africa, present-day Togo.

William, probably a cousin, was running studios in the cities of Cape Coast and Elmina by 1880. Albert George Lutterodt, the son of George Lutterodt, was active as a photographer from around 1876, and Frederick R. C. Lutterodt (1871–1937) opened his studio in Accra in 1889. Erick Lutterodt (1884–1959), the son of Gerhardt Lutterodt, also had a studio in Accra in 1904. Erick and Frederick were successful businessmen with an important urban upper-class clientele. Further, they documented expeditions for the British and German colonial governments travelling through the Gold Coast, Togo, and Cameroon hinterlands. Lutterodt studios in Accra flourished until at least the 1940s. Their collective archive of images is a testimony to the development of urban landscape, political events, important personages and cultural ceremonies, constituting a visual documentation for private and public purposes.

The work of the Lutterodts represents some of the earliest photographic practices in the Gold Coast and provides valuable visual documentation of the people and society of that era, moving beyond the perspectives of European colonial photography. Their studio portraits were often taken in front of hand-painted backgrounds and were carefully composed. Some sitters were featured with African ceremonial symbols or wearing elegant European clothing, which indicated power and prestige.

In the 21st century, the number of existing images attributed to the Lutterodts is small, with some photographs having been acquired from private collections only in the 2020s. In comparison, the quantity of the Lutterodt's original studio output is considered much bigger. Due to economic and practical constraints, some of their photographic plates were re-used and others lost over time. On the other hand, photographers frequently reprinted and sold portraits, initially made for private clients, as commercial picture postcards, sometimes without the permission of their patrons. Commenting on her research both in Western archives and field work in Ghana, Erin Haney, social anthropologist and freelance curator at the National Museum of African Art, wrote in 2015:

Working collaboratively with numerous family historians both in Ghana and internationally for two decades now, we know there is still much to do to piece together the Lutterodts' larger West African oeuvre. Their studios multiplied and expanded along the coast, and they apprenticed new West African photographers as they moved. The Lutterodts' photographic legacy is fragmentary, but, in Ghana, there are countless local historians tending to these photographic traces and artistries, which, in turn, comprise community and transnational photographic histories.

— Erin Haney, Photographing the Gold Coast: The Lutterodt Studios

== Reception ==
=== Scholarly research ===
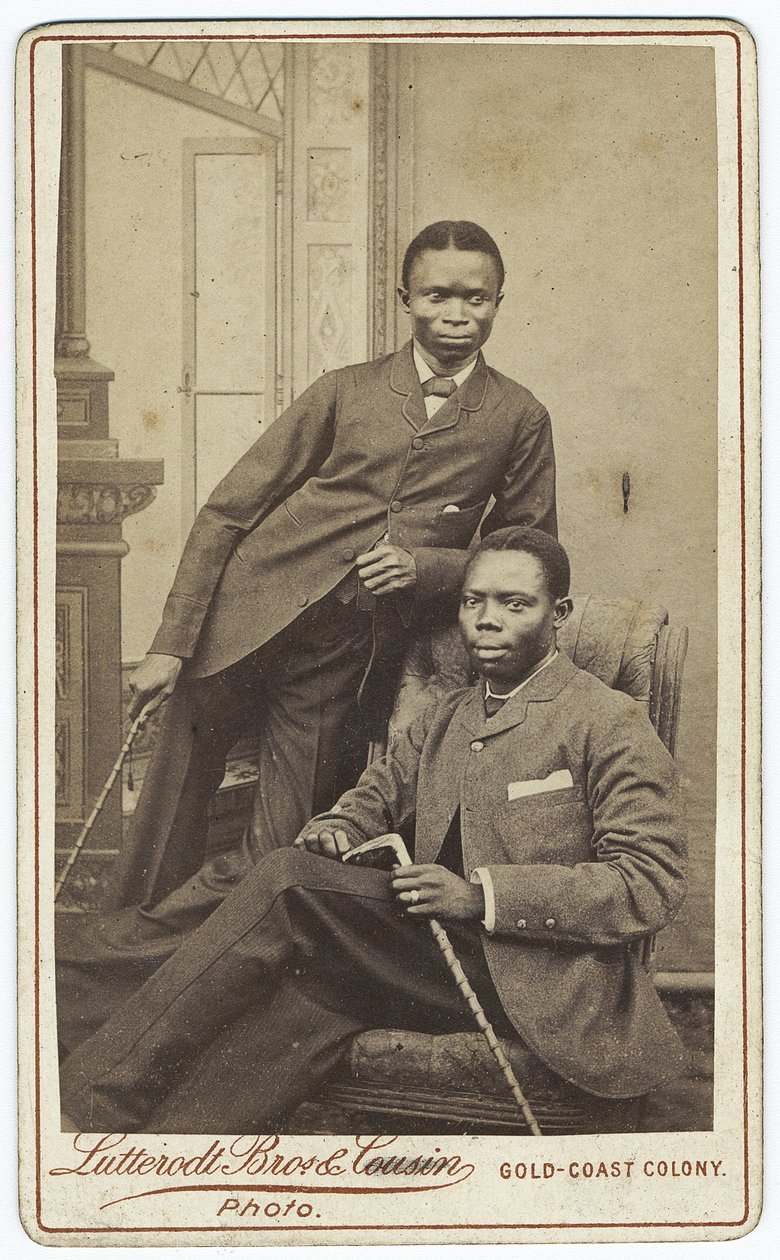
Carte de visite with double portrait of unidentified men by Lutterodt Bros and Cousin, gelatin silver print, c. 1880

Since the 1980s, scholars specialising in social anthropology and visual culture have written about the Lutterodt Studios and their significance for the history of African photography. These resources offer insights into the Lutterodt brothers' contributions to photography in West Africa. Further, the publications explore the Lutterodts' role as early commercial photographers in the Gold Coast, their artistic practices, and the social and cultural significance of their portraiture in a colonial context. According to these studies, the work of the Lutterodt family provides valuable insights into the social history of West Africa and how their studios contributed to identity formation and self-representation.

Following her 2004 PhD thesis titled If These Walls Could Talk!: Photographs, Photographers and Their Patrons in Accra and Cape Coast, Ghana 1840-1940, Erin Haley has published several studies about the Lutterodts and their work. Commenting on a double portrait of two men, Haley stressed the importance of 19th-century African pioneers of photography who have often been overlooked.

The Lutterodts' photographs and histories utterly upend the notion that the camera's introduction in the nineteenth century was a hegemonic tool used primarily for the colony. The Lutterodts were agents of the modern, working in cosmopolitan milieux and anchored in West Central Africa's social, political, and creative worlds. To iterate their histories as merely reactions to colonial photographic fictions reflects an ignorance of the depth and complexity of local and transnational west African artistry.

— Erin Haley, The Modernist Lens of Lutterodt Studios

In her chapter "Emptying the Gallery. The Archive's fuller circle", in Photography in Africa: Ethnographic Perspectives, Haney discussed her field work about the role of family photographic archives in Accra and Cape Coast, Ghana. She argued that family-held photo collections function not as static archives but as valuable sources of communal memory. Further, she claimed that photographs are continually reinterpreted and repurposed. For instance, she noted practices such as re-photographing old images with photographs to indicate deceased individuals, or even altering images to reflect changes in family dynamics. According to Haney, these actions transform photographs into living documents that encapsulate both personal and communal histories.

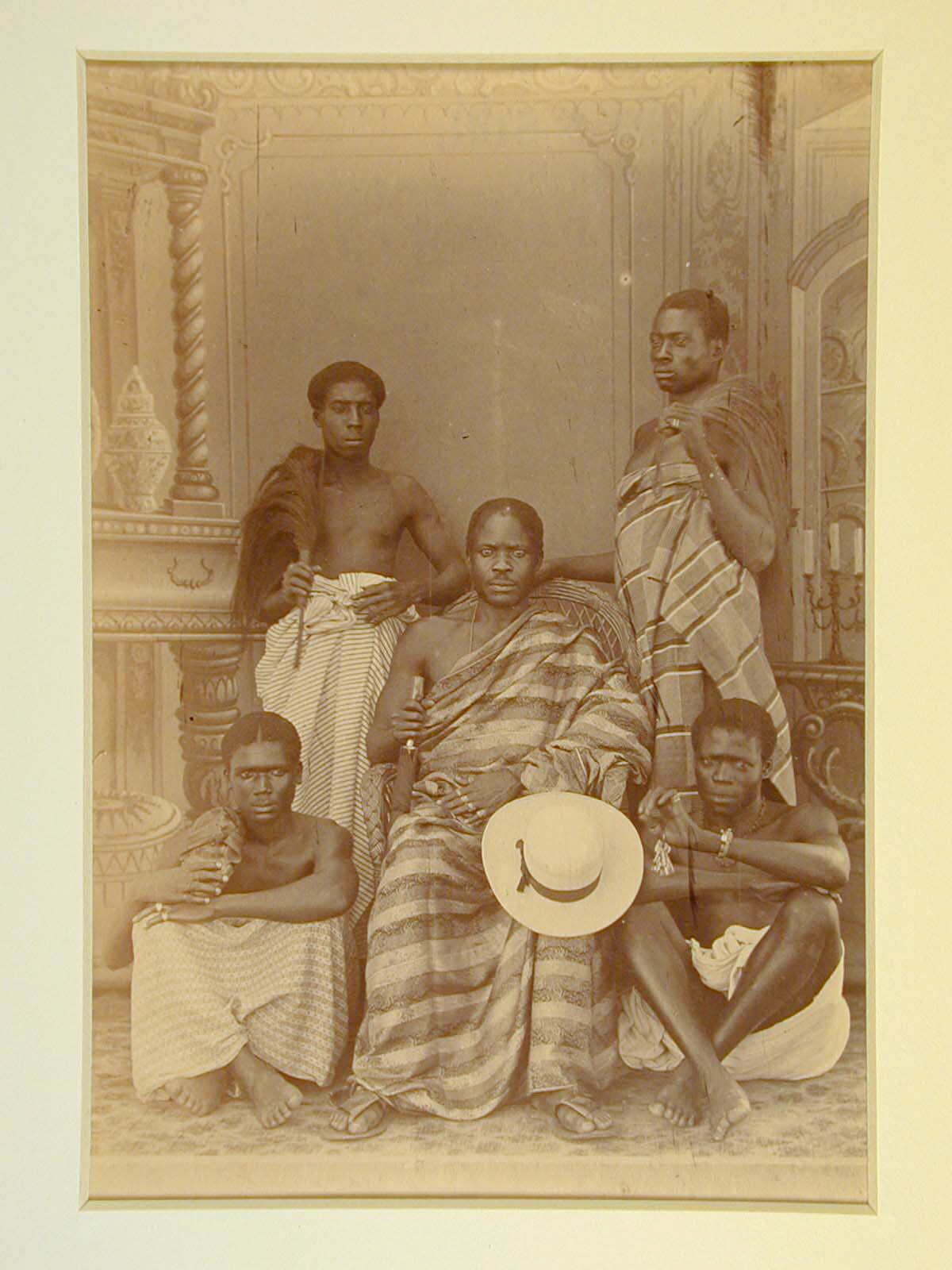
Lutterodt and Son Studio: Five Ghanaian Men in Traditional Attire, c. 1880–1885

The book Ethnographic Collecting and African Agency in Early Colonial West Africa by Zachary Kingdon presented examples of the relationship between European collectors and African individuals during the early colonial period in West Africa. It highlighted the role that African agents such as the Lutterodts played in the collection of ethnographic materials, emphasizing their agency and influence in these interactions. Rather than being passive subjects, Kingdon emphasized that African agents – including the Lutterodts – played an active role in collecting for the colonial archives. The book challenged one-sided narratives that often portray colonial collecting as a one-sided endeavor, instead of presenting a more nuanced view that acknowledges the contributions and perspectives of African participants.

In his study "Circulating West-African Photographs in the Atlantic Visualscape", Jürg Schneider, historian from the University of Basel, Switzerland, noted that various Lutterodt photographers worked in many parts of West and Central Africa – from Accra to Cameroon and as far south as Fernando Pó – from the 1870s to the mid-1900s.

=== Lutterodt photographs in public collections ===
The Metropolitan Museum of Art collection includes an 1880s Lutterodt albumen silver print from a glass negative, with five Ghanaian men in traditional attire. It was featured in their 2015 West Africa exhibition and catalogue titled "In and Out of the Studio: Photographic Portraits from West Africa." Other photographs attributed to the Lutterodts are part of the collections of the New York Public Library, the Metropolitan Museum of Art, and the Walther Collection, New York and Neu-Ulm, Germany. In Europe, photographs by the Lutterodt family are held in the Museum of World Cultures in the Netherlands, the Basel Mission archive and the Rietberg Museum, in Switzerland. Two albumen prints by the Lutterodts were included in the 2022 exhibition "The Future is Blinking. Early Studio Photography from West and Central Africa" at the Rietberg Museum, Zurich.

== See also ==
- Herzekiah Andrew Shanu
- Alphonso Lisk-Carew
- John Parkes Decker
- Francis W. Joaque
- J. A. Green (photographer)
- Neils Walwin Holm
- Augustus Washington
- George Da Costa
