= J. A. Green =

J. A. Green may refer to:

- Sandy Green (mathematician) (James Alexander Green, 1926–2014), professor of mathematics
- J. A. Green (photographer) (1873–1905), Nigerian photographer
