= John Parkes Decker =

West African photographer (c. 1840s–c. 1890s)

- Born: 1840s The Gambia or Sierra Leone
- Died: 1890s
- Occupations: Portrait and documentary photographer
- Years active: 1867–1890s
- Known for: Portraits and documentary photography of 19th-century West Africa

John Parkes Decker (c. 1840s–c. 1890s) was an early West African photographer, born in pre-colonial times of today's regions of The Gambia or Sierra Leone. Having worked in coastal regions from Senegal to Cameroon, his earliest mention is from 1867, and he was active until at least 1890.

Travelling between major cities in colonial West Africa, Decker worked for both European and African clients. His work included portraits as well as pictures documenting social and political life. In particular, he was commissioned by the British Colonial Offices to photograph buildings and urban spaces such as Freetown in Sierra Leone. Decker's contributions are notable for the history of African photography, representing early efforts by African-born individuals to document their societies through the photographic medium.

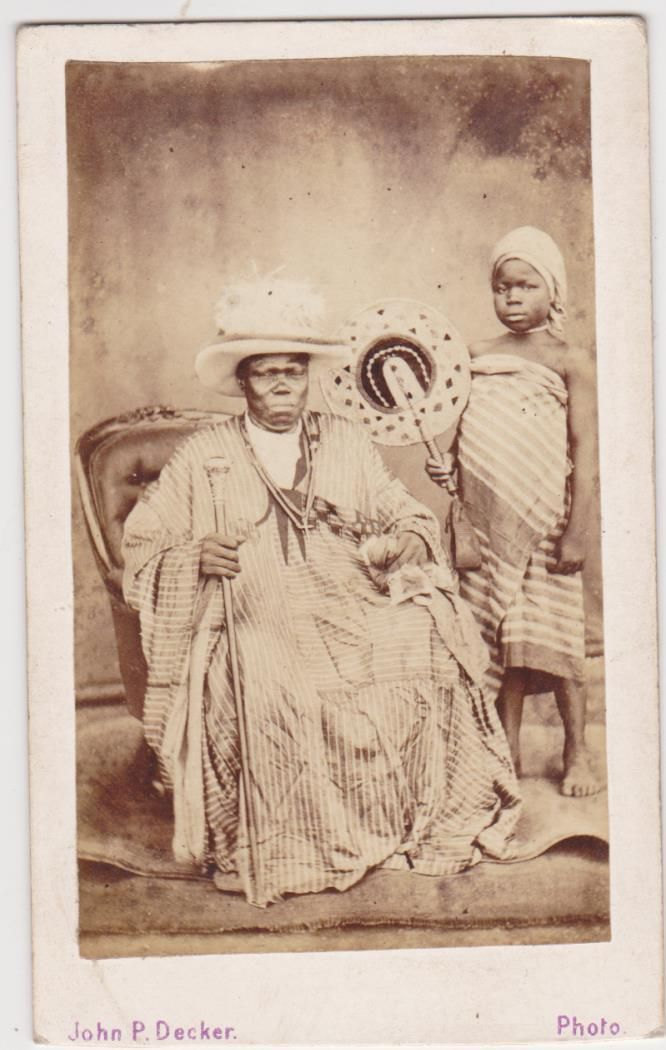
Carte de visite with a studio portrait of an African man and child

== Biography ==
John Parkes Decker was one of the earliest West African photographers. He was active from the late 1860s through at least 1890. Believed to have been born in The Gambia or Sierra Leone, he was among the first African-born photographers to work professionally along the West African coast. His images as itinerant photographer were taken in coastal regions from 19th-century colonial Senegal to Cameroon. Working for both European and African clients, his work included personal portraits as well as documentation of social and political life. It is not known, whether Decker ever operated his own permanent studio. His existing photographs in various archives span a period of about 25 years, until at least 1890. As was common for African photographers of the time, Decker did not only work in one city, but was rather looking for clients in wider areas on the western coast of Africa.

In one of his articles about Decker, historian Jürg Schneider from the University of Basel, Switzerland, wrote: "The earliest reference to the activity of an Africa-born photographer dates back to 1867. In the official journal, the Moniteur du Sénégal et dépendances, the photographer John Parkes Decker thanked the people of Saint-Louis, Senegal, "for the sympathies which he was the subject of."

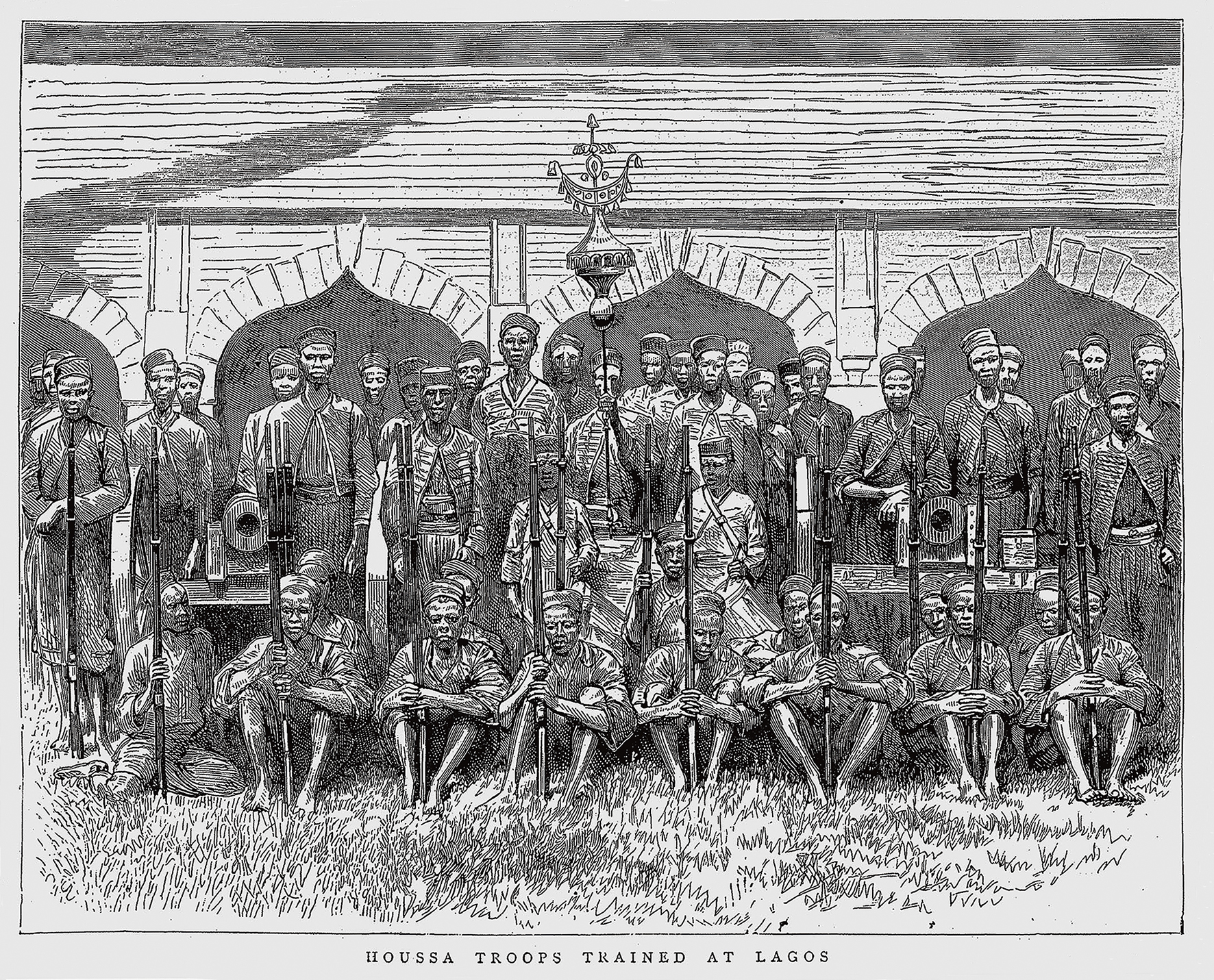
Houssa Troops Trained at Lagos, The Graphic, 6 December 1873.

Between 1869 and 1871, Decker responded to a government circular by the Colonial Office for "photographs of the principal buildings and most interesting localities" and documented numerous buildings in Freetown. The prints were held in duplicate albums in the colony itself and in the Colonial Office library in London. Decker's photos reached London at a time when the imperial government was lacking reliable maps of Sierra Leone, especially those of Freetown. The photographs served as geographical reference points for future communications and as a visual guide for any official travelling for new assignements. Forty-one albumen prints still exist in an album kept at the National Archives of the United Kingdom.

One of Decker's works titled "Houssa Troops Trained at Lagos" was published as an engraving in The Graphic illustrated newspaper in December 1873. The last known photographs by Decker were made of the Polish explorer Etienne de Szolc-Rogozinski and his wife, taken on the island of Fernando Pó in 1890.

== Reception ==
=== Photography as a new technology in Africa ===
Photography, which spread and evolved through local and transnational networks of practitioners, was quickly appreciated by African patrons and businessmen. Photographers, clients and images moved along the major coastal cities, often crossing national and ethnic boundaries. The first studios were frequently temporary, set up by professional photographers who worked on the move from one urban center to the next. Photographers often reproduced and sold portraits originally made for private clients as cartes de visite also in commercial forms such as picture postcards, with or without the permission of the clients.

Commenting on the technical challenges of photography in 19th-century Africa, a study about the emergence of photography in Sierra Leone stated:

[...] the nineteenth-century photographer required a formidable array of equipment and chemicals. Cameras were large and cumbersome in order to accommodate the standard glass negative sizes of 8 X 10 in. or 16 X 20 in. Photographers coated and sensitised their own glass negatives immediately before exposing them. Chemicals, bottles, trays and glass plates were necessary for sensitisation. Since the collodion plate required total processing while still wet, a darkroom or light-resistant tent was essential during the entire procedure.

— Vera Viditz-Ward, Photography in Sierra Leone, 1850–1918

=== Scholarship about Decker's work ===
For her 2011 research paper about the beginnings of photography in West Africa, Vera Viditz-Ward had chosen Freetown because of its extended history of shared everyday life between Africans and Europeans. Her research was based on ten years of investigating early photographs taken by Sierra Leonean photographers such as John Parkes Decker, Francis W. Joaque and Alphonso Lisk-Carew. In doing so, she used various methods of field research, including discussions of family portraits and photographic albums with people from Freetown. Further, she looked up contemporary photographers throughout Sierra Leone and studied colonial archives in England to find photographs dating back to colonial rule. Based on her research, she stated that "early photographs show how non-Western peoples created new forms of artistic expression by adapting European technology and visual idioms for their own purposes." She further posited that "a community of African photographers has worked in the city of Freetown since the inception of photography."

In particular, Viditz-Ward wrote about Decker and his documentary photographs for the Colonial Office: Apart from publishing three of his images of Freetown urban scenes, she called Decker's "skill and technical control [...] consistently apparent in his architectural photographs" and his skill as a visual artist "reflected in his composition and vantage points."

The 2023 scholarly article "Representing Freetown: Photographs, maps and postcards in the urban cartography of colonial Sierra Leone" related photographic history to the history of cartography. It argued that these two forms of representation, often viewed as separate, were frequently intertwined in the production of geographic knowledge. Only a few decades after its invention, photography had become a tool for European travellers, scientists and anthropologists across the empire. Research into the early photography of West Africa has shown that African photographers in the 19th century such as Decker played an important role in producing a spatial imaginary of place. In this way, photographs served similar purposes as did maps. Further, the article described photography and mapping as both having reduced the world to two dimensions, making the vast spaces of empire legible and knowable."

In her 2018 book Postcards from Africa: Photographers of the Colonial Era cultural anthropologist Christraud M. Geary described a picture postcard attributed to Parker. This image, taken before 1872, shows Prince Archibong II, the head of Duke Town, in what is now Calabar in Cross River State, Nigeria. In this studio portrait, the royal sitter was placed on an armchair, wearing an expensive necklace and clothes and a European-inspired crown. According to Geary, this kind of staged portrait with Victorian-style elements shows that Africans were connected with the outside world of cosmopolitan cities, where "African elites seamlessly appropriated and integrated foreign elements into their own cultural practices."

In 2022, three of his photographs were included in the exhibition "The Future is Blinking. Early Studio Photography from West and Central Africa" at the Rietberg Museum, Zurich.

== See also ==
- Francis W. Joaque
- Alphonso Lisk-Carew
- J. A. Green (photographer)
- Neils Walwin Holm
- Augustus Washington
- George Da Costa
- Lutterodt photographers
- Alex Agbaglo Acolatse
