= Alex Agbaglo Acolatse =

Togolese photographer (1880–1975)

- Born: 1880; Kedzi, Slave Coast of West Africa
- Died: 1975 (aged 94–95); Lomé, Togo
- Occupations: Portrait and documentary photographer
- Years active: 1900–1970s
- Known for: 20th-century photography of Togo

Alex Agbaglo Acolatse (1880–1975) was a Togolese photographer and postcard publisher, known for his studio portraits and documentation of colonial-era Togo in the first half of the 20th century. His work has been featured in several specialised publications and exhibitions, including the collections of the Metropolitan Museum of Art in New York and the Rietberg Museum in Switzerland.

== Biography ==
Acolatse was a Togolese photographer known for his work in early West African studio photography. Born in Kedzi, a coastal town in what is now Ghana's Volta Region, Acolatse was the son of a traditional chief.

In the early 1900s, Acolatse was introduced to photography by Frederick Lutterodt, an itinerant photographer based in the Gold Coast (present-day Ghana). After his training, he established his own studio in Lomé, the capital of Togo. Between 1920 and 1930, he produced a series of postcards depicting people and landmarks along the coastal region between Accra and Lagos, capturing pictures of West African life during the colonial era. Acolatse's studio became a hub for the Lomé upper classes, where he crafted elegant portraits that underlined his subjects' social status through their attire and poses. His studio photographs are noted for their use of painted backdrops and architectural props, creating an impression of realism with theatrical elements. His photograph titled "Self-portrait with Balustrade and Hanging" from the 1910s exemplifies his artistic approach. This and another portrait of two young men in elegant suits with a backdrop suggesting aristocratic interiors show the sitters as members of the Togolese elite.

Beyond his photographic work, Acolatse served as the president of Togo’s Association of Professional Photographers, mentoring aspiring photographers. He retired in 1956, passing on his studio to a family member, and continued to inspire future generations until his death in Lomé in 1975.

== Reception ==
=== Publications and exhibitions ===
Several scholarly works, publications about African art and exhibitions have explored the life and contributions of Acolatse to 20th-century photography in Togo:

- A monograph by Philippe David, published in Togo in 1993, titled Alex A. Acolatse: Hommage à l’un des Premiers Photographes Togolais presented an in-depth look at Acolatse's life and work, based on detailed research conducted in Lomé, Togo.
- "Africa by Herself: African Photography from 1840 to the Present". This 1998 exhibition included Acolatse's full-length portraits, emphasizing the cosmopolitan nature of African studio photography and its role in self-representation.
- Acolatse's work was mentioned in the 1999 book Revue Noire: Africa by Africans: a Photographic View, published by the Smithsonian Institution in Washington, D.C.
- In 2015 an exhibition and accompanying publication titled In and Out of the Studio: Photographic Portraits from West Africa was shown by the Metropolitan Museum of Art in New York, featuring two of Acolatse's self-portraits alongside other West African photographers.
- In her 2018 book Postcards from Africa: Photographers of the Colonial Era cultural anthropologist Christraud M. Geary described a picture postcard by Acolatse. This image, taken in the 1920s, shows Lawson, the king of Anécho in French Togo. In this studio portrait, the royal sitter was dressed in expensive clothes before a European backdrop of a painted garden. According to Geary, this staged portrait would "declare his rank and aim at elevating him in the eyes of the locals as well as the French." Geary further noted that Victorian-style elements show that Africans were connected with the outside world of cosmopolitan cities, where "African elites seamlessly appropriated and integrated foreign elements into their own cultural practices."
- Two early photographs by Acolatse were included in the 2022 exhibition "The Future is Blinking. Early Studio Photography from West and Central Africa" at the Rietberg Museum in Zurich, Switzerland.

Further, the French specialized publisher Revue Noire has published Acolatse's work along with other notable photographers in several magazines and photo books, noting that "Many artists from Africa are now considered as artists, rather than "African artists".

=== Acolatse's work in public collections ===
The Rietberg Museum, Zurich, and the Metropolitan Museum of Art hold several silver prints and glass plates of Acolatse's photographs, presenting his studio work and providing insight into the fashion and social status of Togolese upper class society of the early 20th century.

== See also ==
- Alphonso Lisk-Carew
- Lutterodt photographers
- John Parkes Decker
- Francis W. Joaque
- Neils Walwin Holm
- Augustus Washington
- J. A. Green (photographer)
