= Francis W. Joaque =

Sierra Leonean photographer (c. 1845–1895)

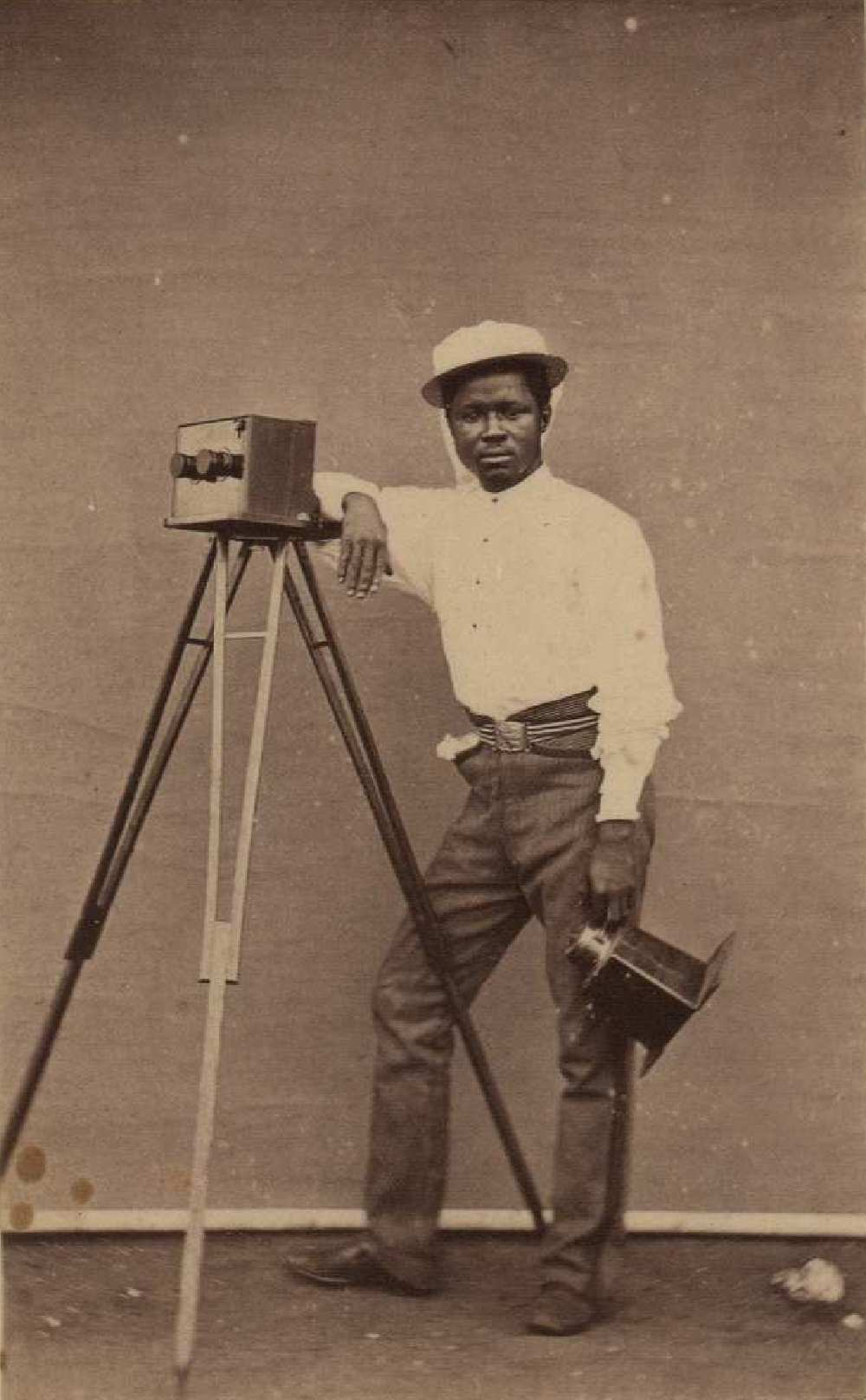
- Joaque, c. 1890
- Born: Francis Wilberforce Joaque c. 1845; Freetown, Sierra Leone
- Died: 1 November 1895 (age 50); Freetown, Sierra Leone
- Occupation: Professional photographer
- Years active: c. 1865 – c. 1895
- Notable work: Portraits and documentary photography of 19th-century West and Central Africa
- Spouse: Drucilla McAulay (m. 1870)

Francis Wilberforce Joaque (c. 1845 – 1 November 1895) was a Sierra Leonean photographer. A descendant of liberated Africans, he is known as one of the earliest professional photographers of African descent. His work has contributed notably to the visual history of Central and West Africa during the late 19th century.

Prints of Joaque's historical photographs have been collected as examples of 19th-century African photography by the British Museum, the Netherlands Photo Museum, the Bibliothèque nationale de France, and the Rietberg Museum.

== Biography ==
Joaque was born around 1845 in Freetown, British Sierra Leone, to Krio-speaking parents. His father, Richard Vincent Joaque, was described as "a prominent member of the offspring of Liberated Africans" and being of matrilineal Ijesha Yoruba descent. Joaque's grandfather had been taken from his native home in the Popo area of Dahomey by Spanish slavers, who put him to work as a sailor on a slave ship before he was liberated by the West Africa Squadron following the vessel's capture. After settling in Sierra Leone, Joaque's grandfather ran an auctioneering business, which was passed onto Richard.

Joaque studied at the grammar school of the British Church Missionary Society in Freetown. In the early 1860s, he was trained in navigation for two years on board HMS Rattlesnake. After this, he worked as purser on the Corra Linn, a steamboat of the British governor in Sierra Leone.

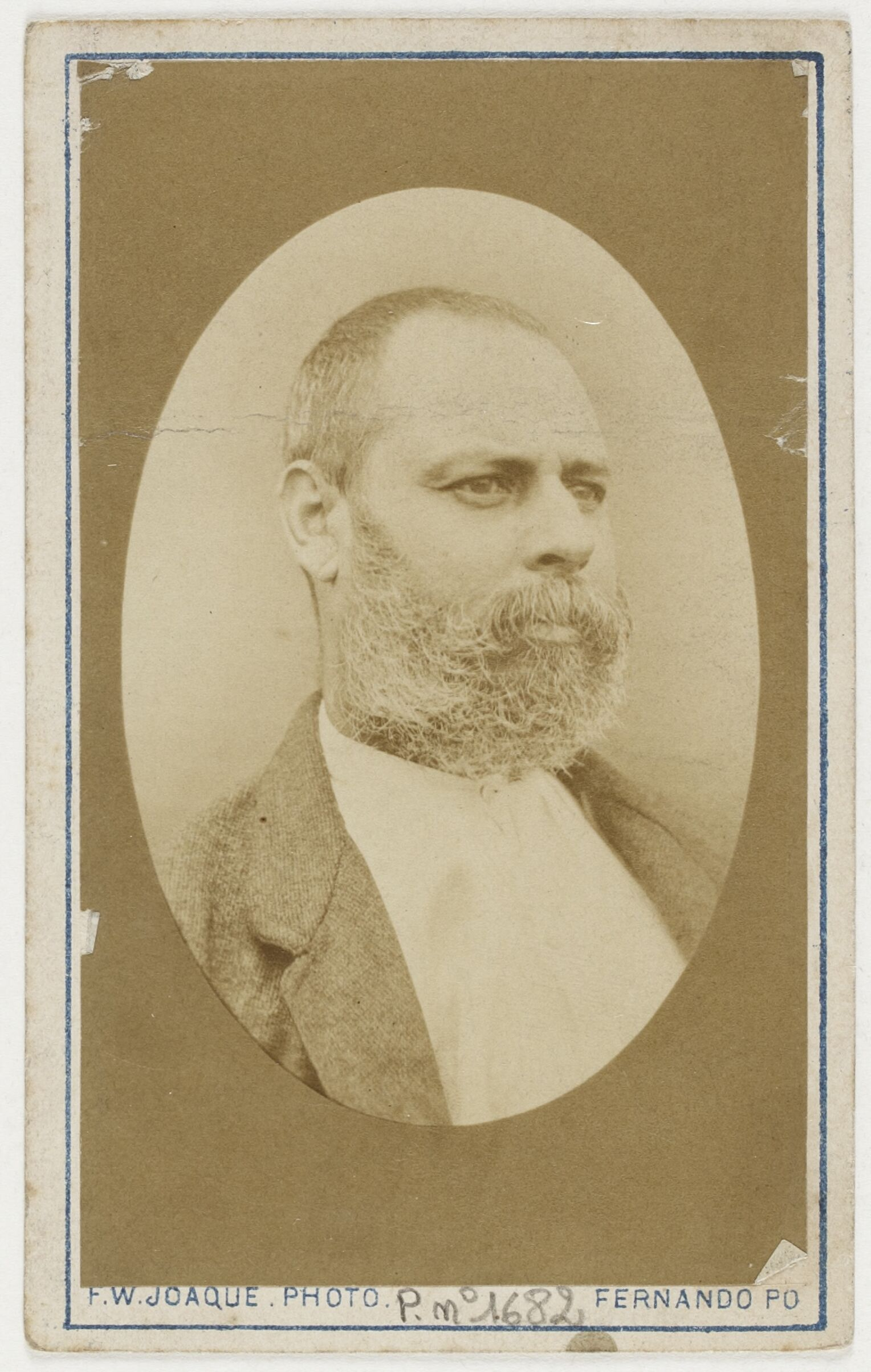
Carte de visite of English explorer in West Africa, Robert Bruce Napoleon Walker, 1886

Joaque, whose photographic career spanned several coastal regions in West and Central Africa, has been considered as one of the earliest African professional photographers. Between 1865 and 1890, he temporarily closed his photographic studio in Freetown and opened a new studio in Fernando Pó, an island in Equatorial Guinea, now called Bioko. In the 1870s, he was commissioned by Spanish governor Diego Santisteban to produce a series of fourteen photographs of Santa Isabel, the former capital of Fernando Pó. During these years, he also worked in Libreville, Gabon. Afterwards, he returned to Freetown and established his new studio in 1890. Some years later, Joaque died in Freetown on 1 November 1895.

== Reception ==
Commenting on the earliest African-born photographers, such as the Lutterodt brothers, Neils Walwin Holm, J. A. Green, and Joaque, as well as on their contribution to the circulation of photographs in West Africa and beyond, historian Jürg Schneider from the University of Basel, Switzerland, wrote:

Visual information about Africa had been reaching Europe for centuries before the latter half of the 19th century, but had concerned relatively small geographical areas and usually only reached a small educated elite. This changed however when new printing techniques permitted production of cheap illustrated magazines and books at the time when European imperialism gained momentum.

— Jürg Schneider, Demand and Supply: Francis W. Joaque, an Early African Photographer in an Emerging Market

Joaque's photographs were published as engravings in 19th-century illustrated magazines such as La Ilustración Española y Americana in Spain and Über Land und Meer in Germany, as well as in missionary reports and travelogues.

Further, his photographs were presented in colonial exhibitions, including those in Gabon (1887) and Paris (1900), highlighting his international recognition and the demand for his work during that era. In his study "Circulating West-African Photographs in the Atlantic Visualscape", Schneider discussed the wider circulation of early photography in the region, noting Joaque's work across various regions of West and Central Africa "along the paths of a huge and dynamic network knitted and knotted by the movements of people and photographs."

=== Joaque's photographs in private and public collections ===
According to Christraud M. Geary, about 200 of Joaque's images still exist in European collections. A portrait of him with a stereoscopic camera on a tripod is kept in the National Library of Spain in Madrid. Cartes de visite and albumen prints of his work are held in several public collections, including the British Museum, the Netherlands Photo Museum in Rotterdam, the Bibliothèque nationale de France in Paris, and the Rietberg Museum in Zurich. Further, two of his photographs were included in the 2022 exhibition "The Future is Blinking. Early Studio Photography from West and Central Africa" at the Rietberg Museum.

== Gallery ==
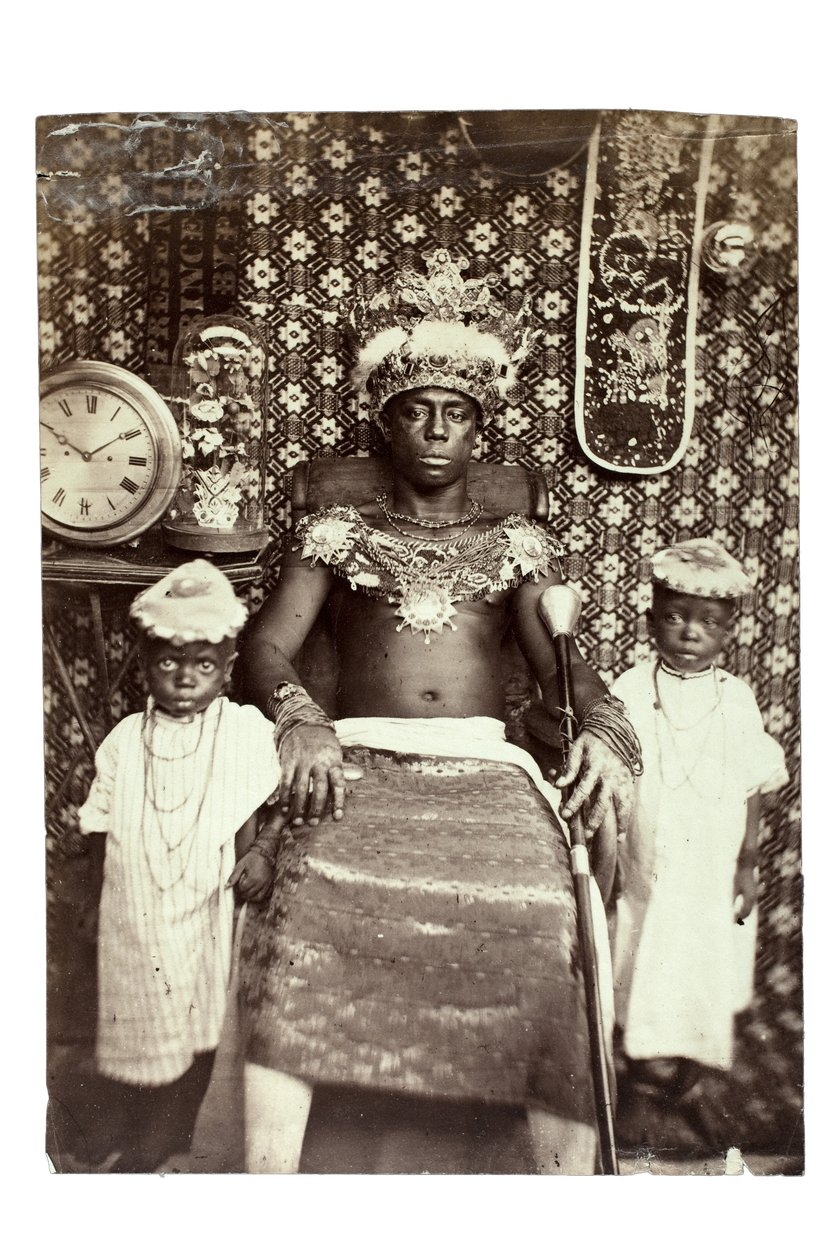
Chief of Calabar, Nigeria, c.1870

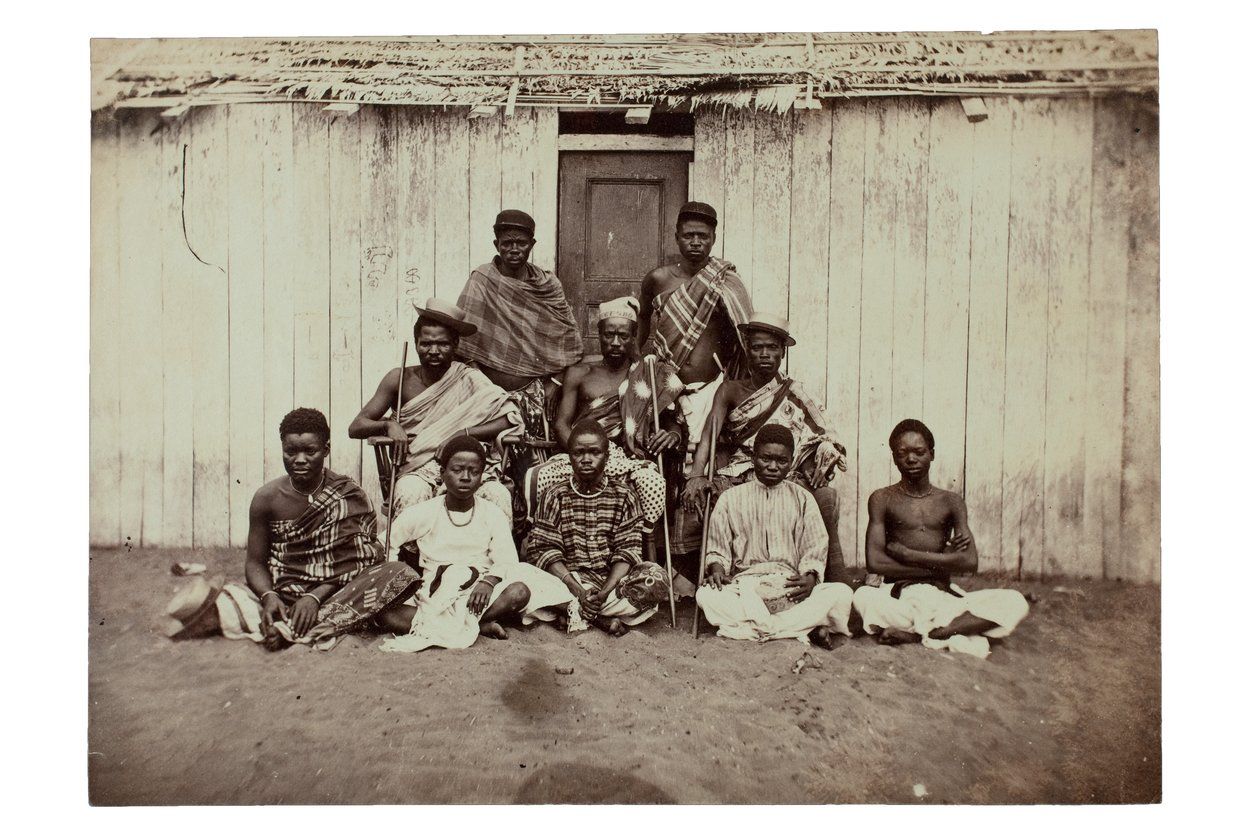
An African chief

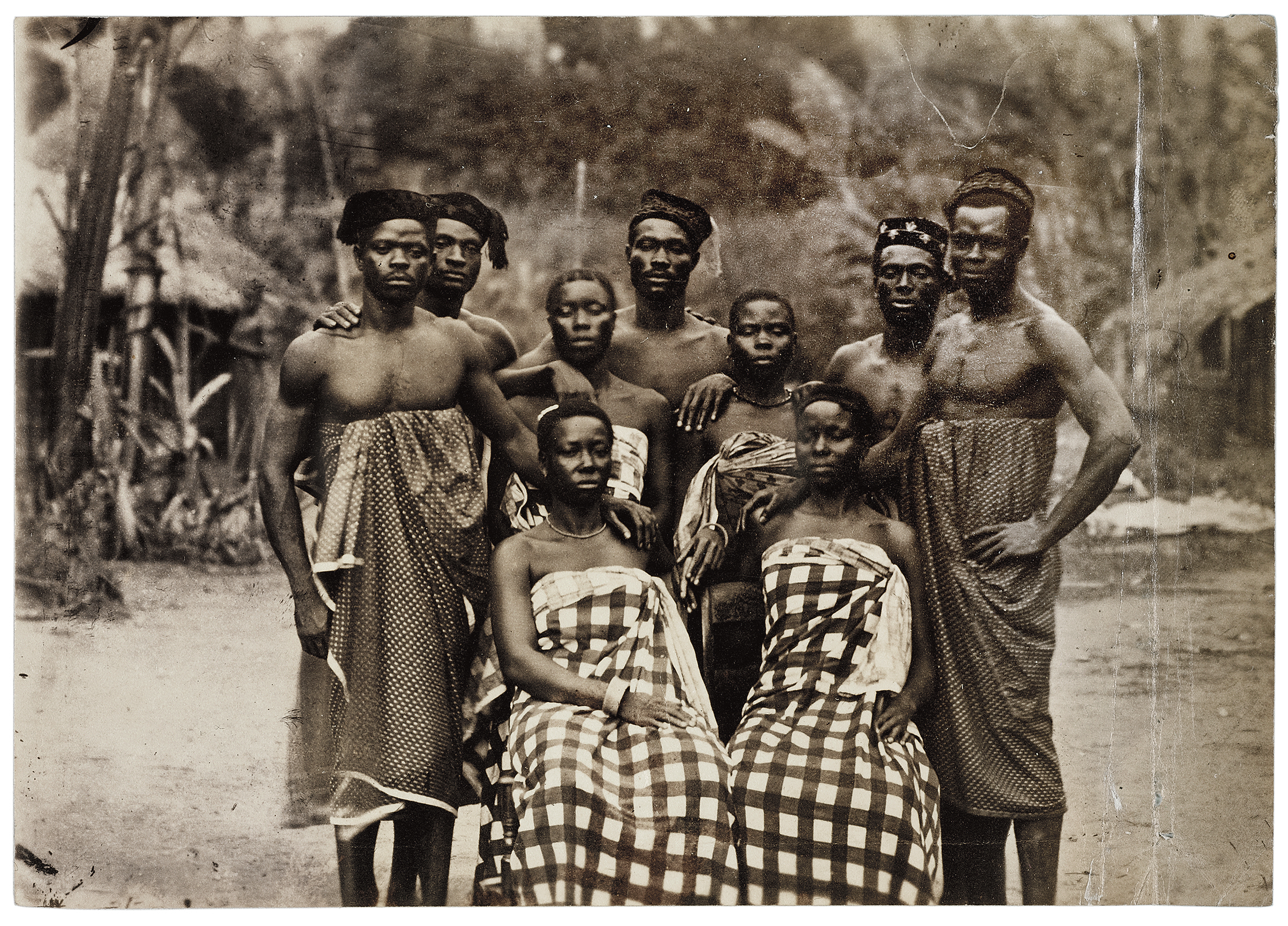
African men and women, Gabon, Batanga, ca. 1870

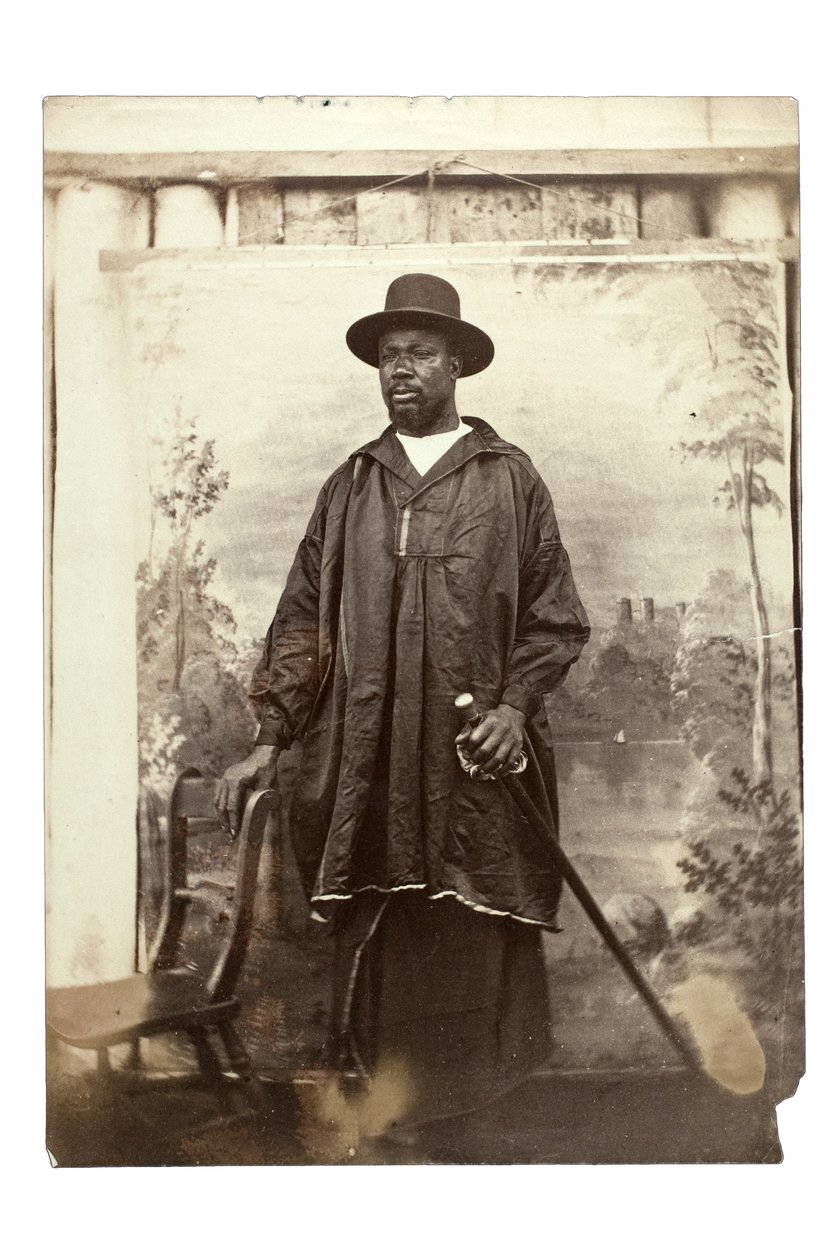
Chief of Brass, Nigeria

== See also ==
- John Parkes Decker
- J. A. Green
- Neils Walwin Holm
- Augustus Washington
- Lutterodt photographers
- Alphonso Lisk-Carew
- Alex Agbaglo Acolatse
