= Real photo postcard =

Photographic image on postcard stock

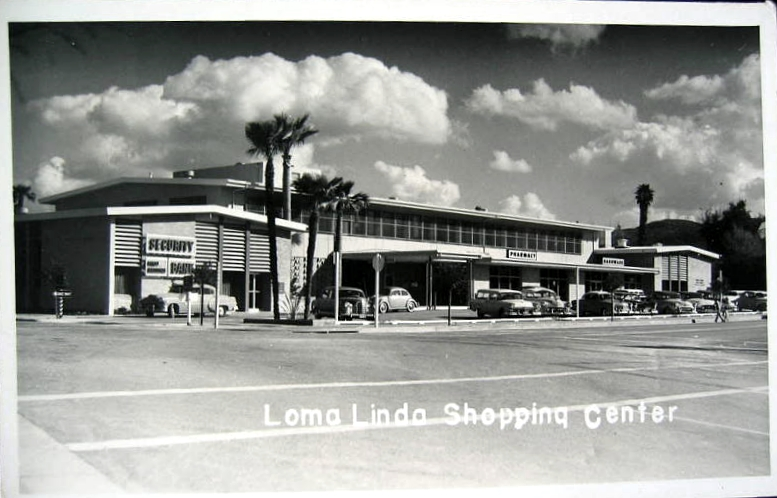
A typical 1940s–early 1950s black-and-white real photo postcard

A real photo postcard (RPPC) is a continuous-tone photographic image printed on postcard stock. The term emphasises the distinction between the real photo process and the lithographic or offset printing processes employed in the manufacture of most postcard images.

== History ==
In 1903, Kodak introduced the No. 3A Folding Pocket Kodak. The camera, designed for postcard-size film, allowed the general public to take photographs and have them printed on postcard backs, usually in the same dimensions (3-1/2" x 5-1/2") as standard vintage postcards. Many other cameras were used, some of which used glass photographic plates that produced images that had to be cropped in order to fit the postcard format.

In 1907, Kodak introduced a service called "real photo postcards," which enabled customers to make a postcard from any picture they took.

While Kodak was the major promoter of photo postcard production, the company used the term "real photo" less frequently than photographers and others in the marketplace from 1903 to c. 1930.

Old House Journal states that "beginning in 1902 Kodak offered a preprinted card back that allowed postcards to be made directly from negatives." This technology allowed photographers to travel from town to town and document life in the places they visited. Old House Journal continues: "Local entrepreneurs hired them to record area events and the homes of prominent citizens. These postcards documented important buildings and sites, as well as parades, fires, and floods. Realtors used them to sell new housing by writing descriptions and prices on the back. Real photo postcards became expressions of pride in home and community, and were also sold as souvenirs in local drug stores and stationery shops."

On March 1, 1907, federal legislation permitted senders to include a message on a portion of the back of a postcard for the first time. Prior to that time, the address only was allowed on one side while the other side could present a photo or artwork. The front side could then accommodate a full-size real photograph. The popularity of real photo postcards soared nationwide, and many people began collecting the cards in albums. The format provided an extensive photo history of the United States, particularly of small-town and rural locations where photography was often a luxury. Many real photo postcards were unique prints captured by amateur photographers, but others were mass-produced by companies such as the Eastern Illustrating and Publishing Company in Belfast, Maine. Real photo postcards were sometimes created and sold as mementoes at the scene of lynchings; (see also lynching postcard) they were also used to document such important events as the Mexican Revolution.

Real photo postcards may or may not have a white border, or a divided back, or other features of postcards, depending on the paper the photographer used.

== Bibliography ==
- Bernhard, Willi: Bernhard Picture Postcard Catalogue: Germany 1870-1945, 1982
- Bogdan, Robert and Todd Weseloh: Real Photo Postcard Guide: The People’s Photography. Syracuse, NY: Syracuse University Press, 2006. ISBN 0-8156-0851-9
- Morgan, Hal & Brown, Andreas: Prairie Fires and Paper Moons: The American Photographic Postcard: 1900-1920, David R. Godine Publisher, Boston, 1981
- Nicholson, Susan Brown: The Encyclopedia of Antique Postcards, Wallace-Homestead Book Co., Radnor, PA, (1994).
- Sante, Luc: Folk Photography: The American Real-Photo Postcard 1905-1930, YETI Books, 2009
- Smith, Jack H.: Postcard Companion: The Collector's Reference, Wallace-Homestead, Radnor, PA, (1989)
- Covington, Ernest G.: "Dating Post-1920 Real Photo Postcards," in Postcard Collector, July 1986, pages 26–28.
- Tulcensky, Harvey and Laetitia Wolff: Real Photo Postcards (Princeton Architectural Press, 2005)
- Vaule, Rosamond B.: As We Were: American Photographic Postcards, 1905-1930, David R. Godine, Publisher, Boston, 2004.
