= Neils Walwin Holm =

West African photographer (1866–1927?)

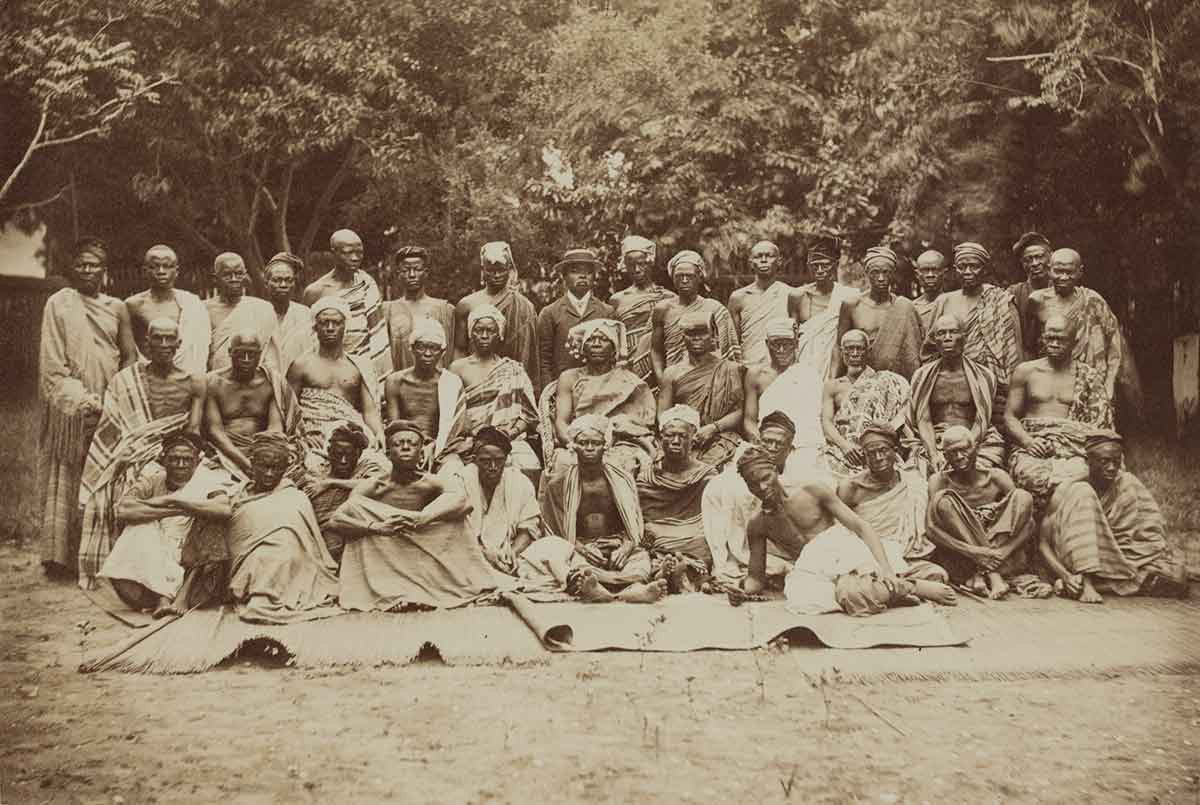
- Holm, c. 1900
- Born: 1866; Gold Coast (present-day Ghana)
- Died: 1927 (aged 60–61)
- Occupations: Photographer; barrister
- Years active: c. 1885–1910
- Organization(s): Royal Photographic Society (member, 1895; fellow, 1896)
- Known for: Pioneer photography in Lagos Colony; introduction of dry-plate photography in Lagos
- Spouse: Unknown (m. 1890; d. 1892)

Neils Walwin Holm (1866–1927?) was a West African photographer who later retrained as a barrister. He has been called "the pre-eminent photographer of Lagos, West Africa, from the 1890s until 1910".

== Biography ==
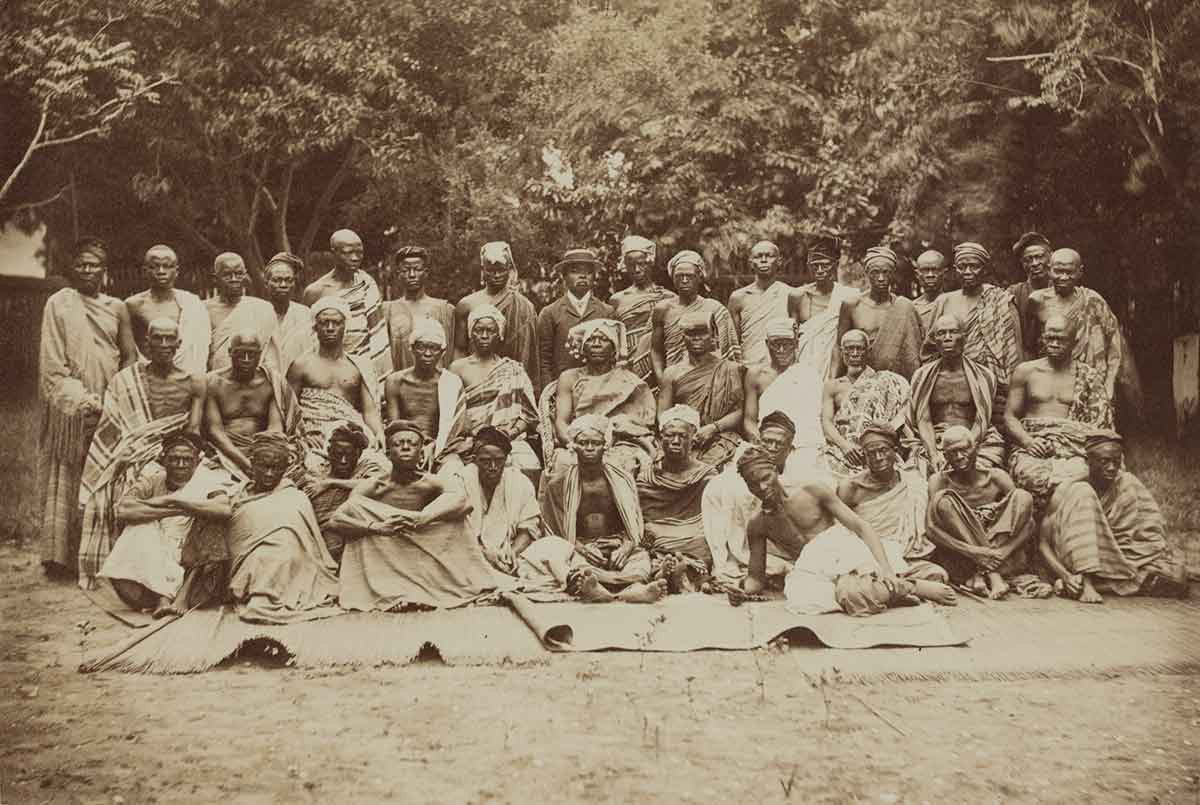
Outdoor group portrait of Africans, with one man in the middle sitting on a chair

Holm was born in the Gold Coast. He left school in 1883 and was apprenticed to his cousins, who were professional photographers. Leaving them in 1885, he was commissioned by a German merchant who had imported photographic equipment for him to use. With his commission he managed to purchase the equipment, and moved to Lagos Colony in 1886.

There, he built a successful photographic business, gaining early commissions from the colonial administration. He is said to have been the first photographer in Lagos Colony to introduce the dry plate, using plates manufactured in Ilford in England. He married in 1890, though his wife died in 1892.

In July 1893, Holm travelled to Britain for the first time, visiting a Pall Mall exhibition by the Photographic Society of Great Britain. On his return to Lagos, he advertised himself as a West African representative of UK manufacturers. He kept up transatlantic connections using a telegraphic cable address and advertisements in the British magazine Practical Photographer. In 1895, he was elected a member of the Royal Photographic Society, and in 1896 became a Fellow.

In 1900, he returned to London to attend the First Pan-African Conference, with another visit to London in 1903. In 1910, he gave up photography, and from 1910 to 1917 trained at the Middle Temple as a barrister for the Lagos courts.

== See also ==
- Francis W. Joaque
- John Parkes Decker
- Lutterodt photographers
- J. A. Green (photographer)
- Augustus Washington
- Alphonso Lisk-Carew
- Alex Agbaglo Acolatse
