= J. A. Green (photographer) =

Nigerian photographer (1873–1905)

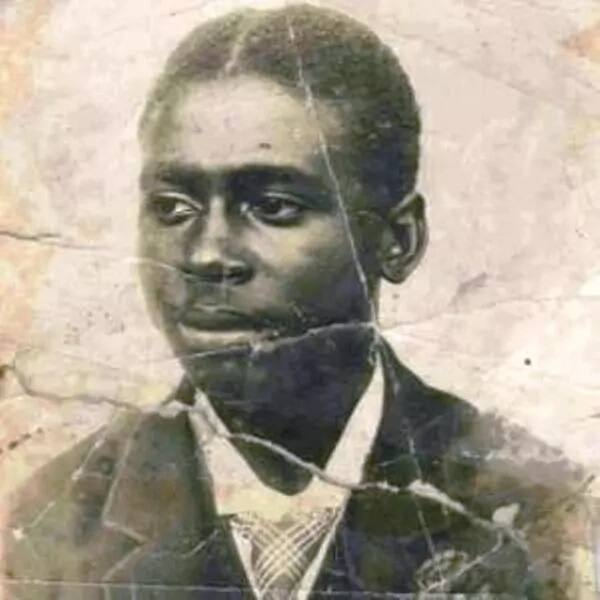
- Jonathan Adagogo Green, 1900
- Born: 1873; Ayama, Kingdom of Bonny
- Died: 1905 (aged 31–32)
- Occupation: Photographer
- Known for: early photography in historical Nigeria

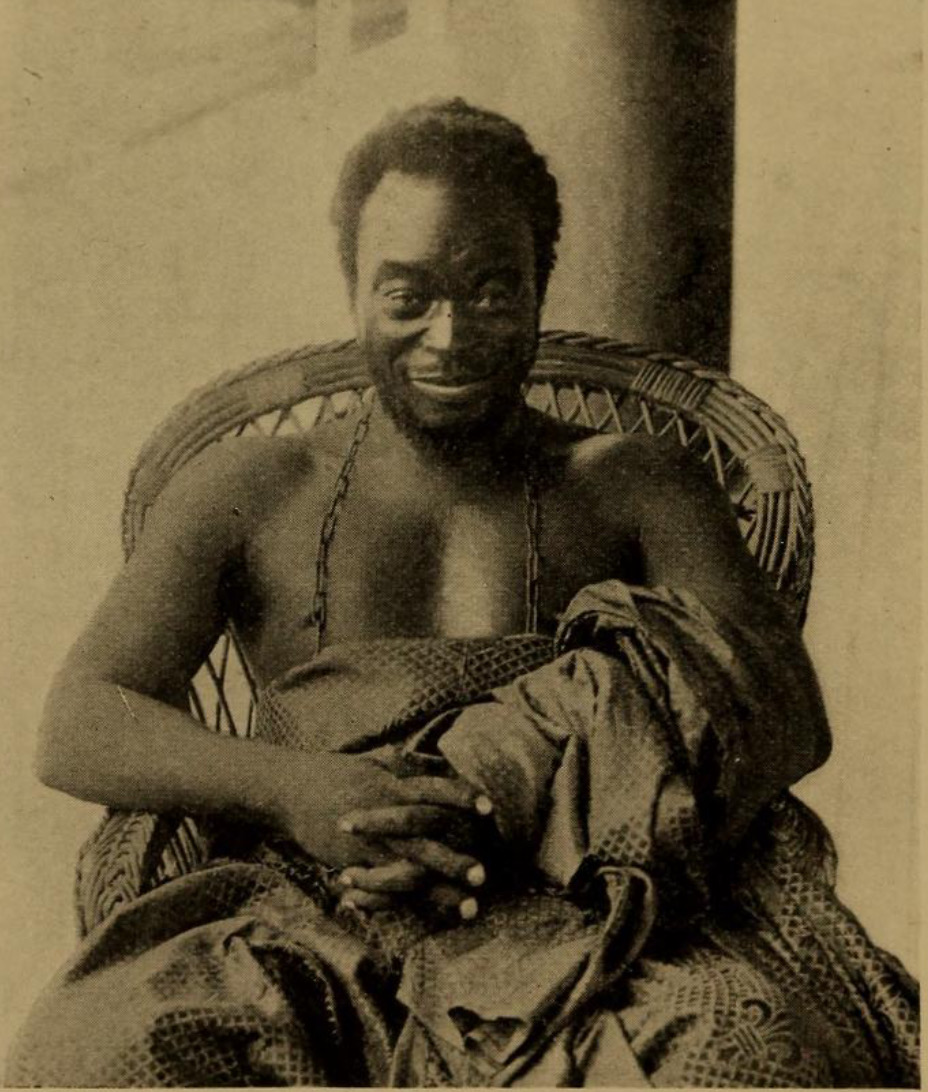
Ovonramwen, the Oba of Benin, photographed by Green on board the Niger Coast Protectorate SY Ivy, while the Oba was on his way to exile in 1897

Jonathan Adagogo Green (1873–1905) was a late 19th-century Nigerian photographer, considered one of the first African professional photographers in his country. He is known as a pioneering photographer in West Africa, notable for his documentation of colonial life and local culture, particularly his Ibani Ijo community.

His photographic work has been collected by the British Museum, the Unilever Archives and the Bristol Archives in the United Kingdom, as well as by the National Museum of African Art in Washington, DC.

== Life and career ==
Green was born in Ayama-Peterside, Kingdom of Bonny, present-day Rivers State, Nigeria, to Sunju Okoronkwoye Dublin Green and Idameinye Green. His father was a village chief and palm oil trader who died in 1875, after which Green was raised by his paternal uncle, Uruasi Dublin Green. He received his education at Bonny's Church Mission Society high school and in Lagos.

Green learned the skills of a photographer in Sierra Leone around the early age of 18 and then founded his own studio in Bonny. The area where he lived became part of the British Oil Rivers protectorate in 1884, which was renamed the Niger Coast Protectorate in 1893. Most of his images were taken in Bonny, Opobo, and Kalabari. From 1900 onwards, these areas were part of the Southern Nigeria Protectorate for the last few years of Green's life.

Green's photographic output encompassed a broad spectrum of subjects, ranging from portraits to images of daily and ritual life, commerce, and architectural scenes. Some of his more than 300 photographs were published in books and magazines in Europe and the US. Additionally, he produced both common picture postcards as well as real photo postcards with his logo embossed.

Green was active as a photographer only for a short time, as he died at the early age of 32. His nephew, Gobo Green, later continued the photography business and a descendant, James A. Green, operated the studio until 1993.

== Bibliography ==
Although during his lifetime Green didn't publish books himself, some of his photographs were reproduced in magazines and in the photobook Benin the surrounding country, inhabitants, customs and trade (The “Journal of Commerce” printing works, Liverpool 1897) by James Pinnock.

== Reception ==
In their monographic work about Green, Martha G. Anderson and Lisa Aronson, and contributors Christraud M. Geary as well as Nigerian writers Ebiegberi Joe Alagoa and Tam Fiofori published their studies along with 350 of Green's images from archives, publications, and photographic albums about colonial events.

As Robert Cochran from the University of Arkansas wrote in his review of the book African Photographer J. A. Green: Reimagining the Indigenous and the Colonial, "[...] he was both energetically productive and remarkably adroit in serving both indigenous and colonial clienteles. [...] When he set up shop, his work was appreciated and rewarded by two very different communities." His "strategic use of initials on his business cards and stamps [...] disguised his African origins", which was part of his working with colonial-era officials.

Photographs attributed to Green and accessible online can be found in the Jones Collection of the Bristol Archives and the United Africa Company collection of the Unilever Archives in London. Additionally, seventy photographs are held at the British Museum. There is also an album of his photographs in the Eliot Elisofon Photographic Archives of the National Museum of African Art in Washington, DC, which is not available online (Nigeria Photograph Album ca. 1890–1900).

== Gallery ==
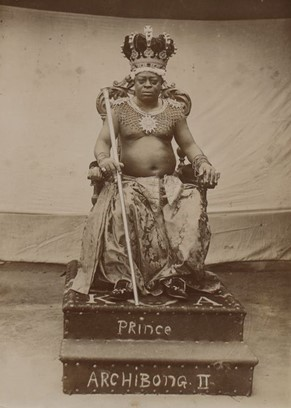
Prince Archibong II, Calabar

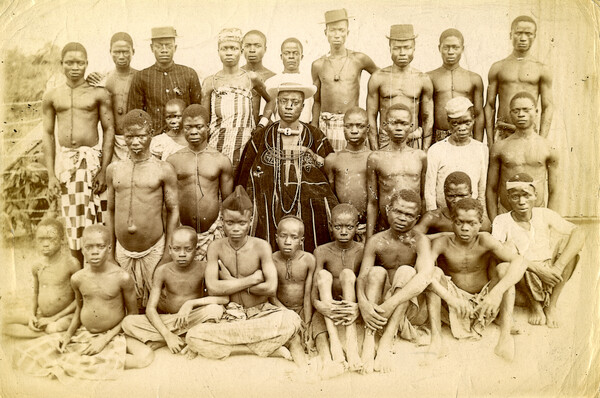
Chief Dore, Benin City

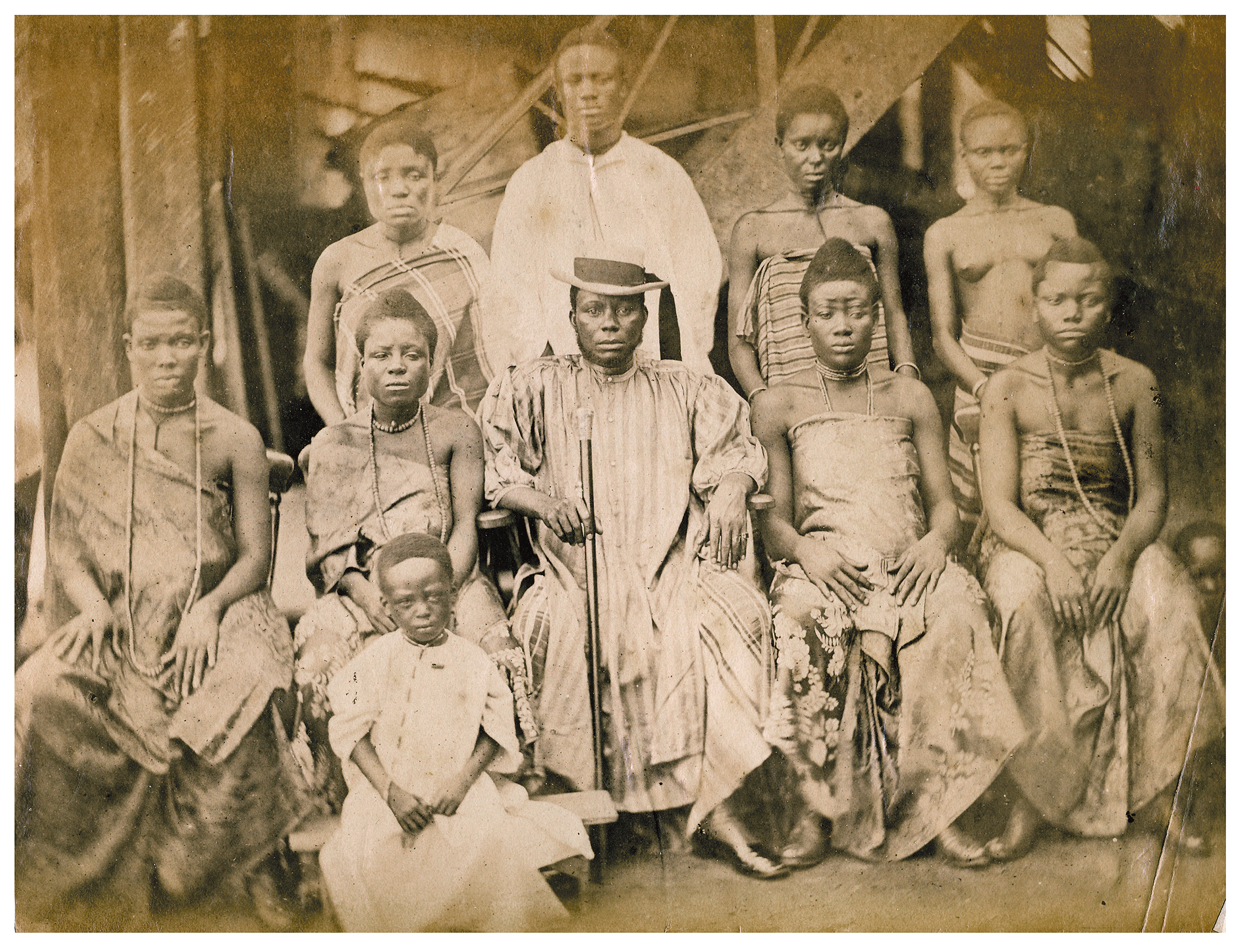
Chief William Brown and his wives, Bonny, Nigeria

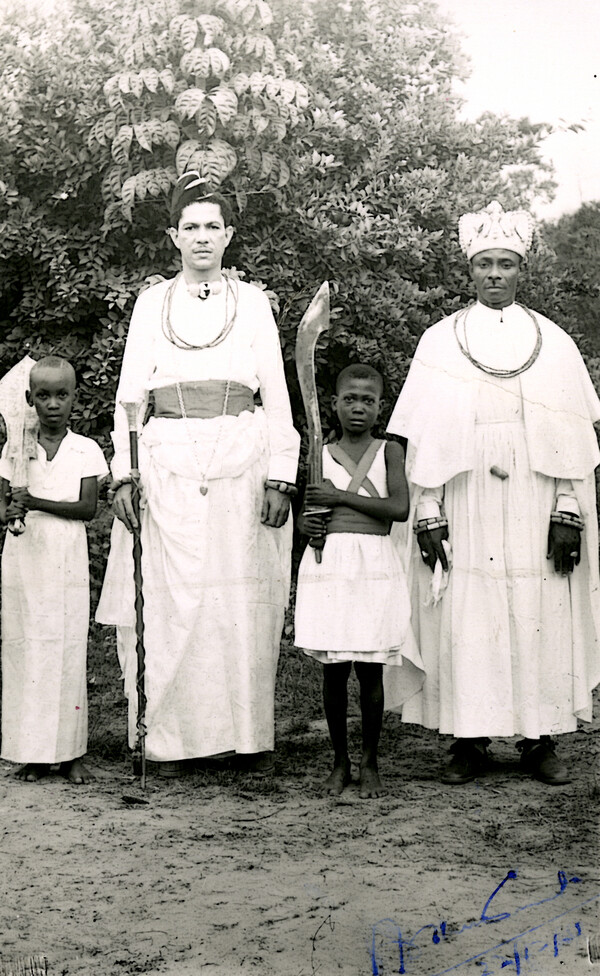
Chief Arthur Prest and Erejuwa II, the Olu of Warri

== See also ==
- John Parkes Decker
- Francis W. Joaque
- Lutterodt photographers
- Neils Walwin Holm
- Augustus Washington
- Alphonso Lisk-Carew
- Alex Agbaglo Acolatse
