= George Da Costa =

Nigerian photographer (1853–1929)

George S. A. Da Costa
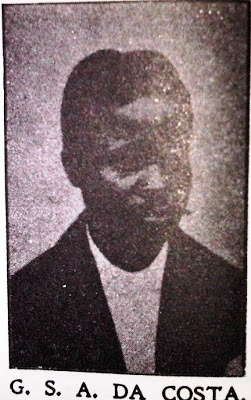
- Born: 1853; Lagos Kingdom, maybe part of the Oyo Empire
- Died: 1929 (aged 75–76)
- Occupation: Photographer
- Known for: Pictures of colonial government projects

George S. A. Da Costa (1853–1929) was a Nigerian photographer who was active in the late 19th and early 20th centuries. He documented government projects, including railway construction in the colony.

== Life ==
George S. A. Da Costa, an Amaro, was born in Lagos, Nigeria, in 1853. He was educated at the CMS Grammar School, Lagos. From 1877 to 1895, he managed the Church Mission Society Bookshop in Lagos. In 1895, he invested £30.00 in special training and then opened a photography business in Lagos. He had a thriving business in the 1890s that continued into the next century.

Da Costa worked as a photographer for the colonial government of Nigeria and took many pictures that recorded government activities throughout the country, including the North. These included pictures of the construction of the railway from Lagos through Jebba to Kaduna. His studio in 1920 was at 18 Ricca Street, Lagos. He worked for Allister Macmillan that year, taking photographs for the Red Book of West Africa. Macmillan called him "the ablest and best known professional photographer in Nigeria". 52 of his photographs appeared in the Red Book, seven taken in Kano and the others in Lagos.

George Da Costa died in 1929.

== Work ==
Da Costa's work depicts a West Africa that is far from the image of the "dark continent" held by Europeans and Americans at the time. He shows a cosmopolitan society of literati, international merchants, attorneys, politicians, newspaper tycoons and socialites. Da Costa's photographs appeared in The Red Book of West Africa: Historical and Descriptive, Commercial and Industrial Facts, Figures, & Resources (1920, edited by Allister Macmillan). The book claimed it was "the first of its kind ever issued on West Africa, also the most profusely illustrated." Many of his photographs are reproduced in Christaud M. Geary's In and Out of Focus: Images from Central Africa, 1885-1960 (2003).

== Sources ==
- "African Peoples' Encounters With Others". Library of Congress.
- Ajiroba Yemi Kotun (2013-08-08). "Paving The Way". The Nigerian Voice.
- Aura Seikkula; Bisi Silva (2013-05-28). "Framing the Moment: The Independent Look of J.D. 'Okhai Ojeikere". africultures.
- "Costa, George S A, Da, b 1853, photographer". Royal Commonwealth Society Photograph Collection. Cambridge University Library. 2004-05-10. Archived from the original on 2016-03-04.
- "Da Costa, George S. A." AAVAD: African American Visual Artists Database.
- Macmillan, Allister (1920). "The Red Book of West Africa". Frank Cass and Co.
- Nimis, Erika (2005). Photographes d'Afrique de l'Ouest: l'expérience yoruba (in French). KARTHALA Editions. ISBN 978-2-84586-691-1.
- Oguibe, Olu (2004). The Culture Game. U of Minnesota Press. ISBN 978-0-8166-4130-7.
