= Berni Searle =

South African painter

- Born: 7 July 1964 (age 62); Cape Town, Western Cape, South Africa
- Education: Michaelis School of Fine Art
- Known for: Photography; Multimedia; Video
- Website: bernisearle.com

Berni Searle (born 7 July 1964 in Cape Town, South Africa) is an artist who works with photography, video, and film to produce lens-based installations that stage narratives connected to history, identity, memory, and place. Often politically and socially engaged, her work also draws on universal emotions associated with vulnerability, loss and beauty.

Searle lives and works in Cape Town, South Africa, and is currently an associate professor at the Michaelis School of Fine Art at the University of Cape Town.

== Early life ==
Searle was born on July 7, 1964, in Cape Town, South Africa, to parents of African and German-English ancestry. As a mixed race person growing up during apartheid in South Africa, Searle was categorized as "Coloured," a label that she later rejected and challenged through her art post-apartheid.

== Education ==
Searle received her BA in fine art in 1987 and a postgraduate diploma in Education in 1988 from the Michaelis School of Fine Art, University of Cape Town.

After graduating, Searle taught art in a Cape Town high school for two years and then re-entered Michaelis, registering for a master's degree in sculpture in 1992. While this was a valuable time for accumulating technical expertise and consolidating an affinity for the three-dimensional form - something that is still visible in her photographic works today -, her search for both form and content continued. Her body of work presented for the master's degree in fine art in 1995 shows abstract, voluminous structures in cement, ciment fondu, steel, wire, bronze, and glass that seem somehow incongruous with the much more intimate and lyrical works by which Searle is recognized today. Created a year after the first democratic elections, these works were meant to question euphoric ideals of nationhood and nation building in a lexicon strongly mediated, even regulated, by context and instruction.

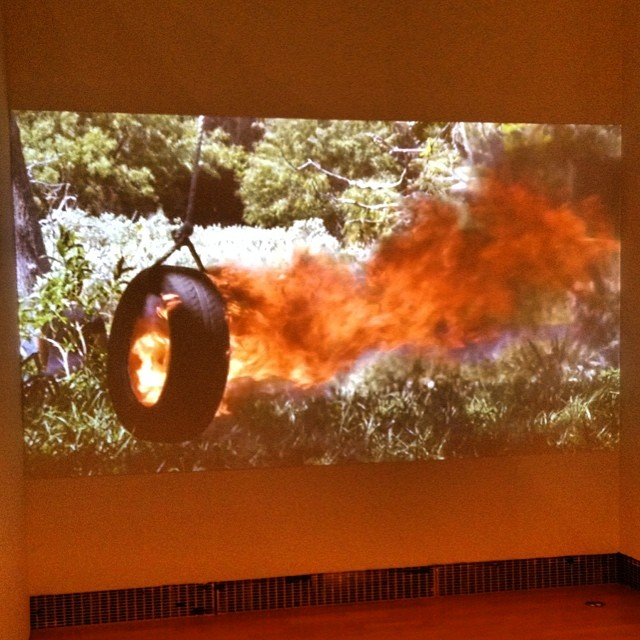
Installation view of "Lull" (2009), from the Black Smoke Rising series

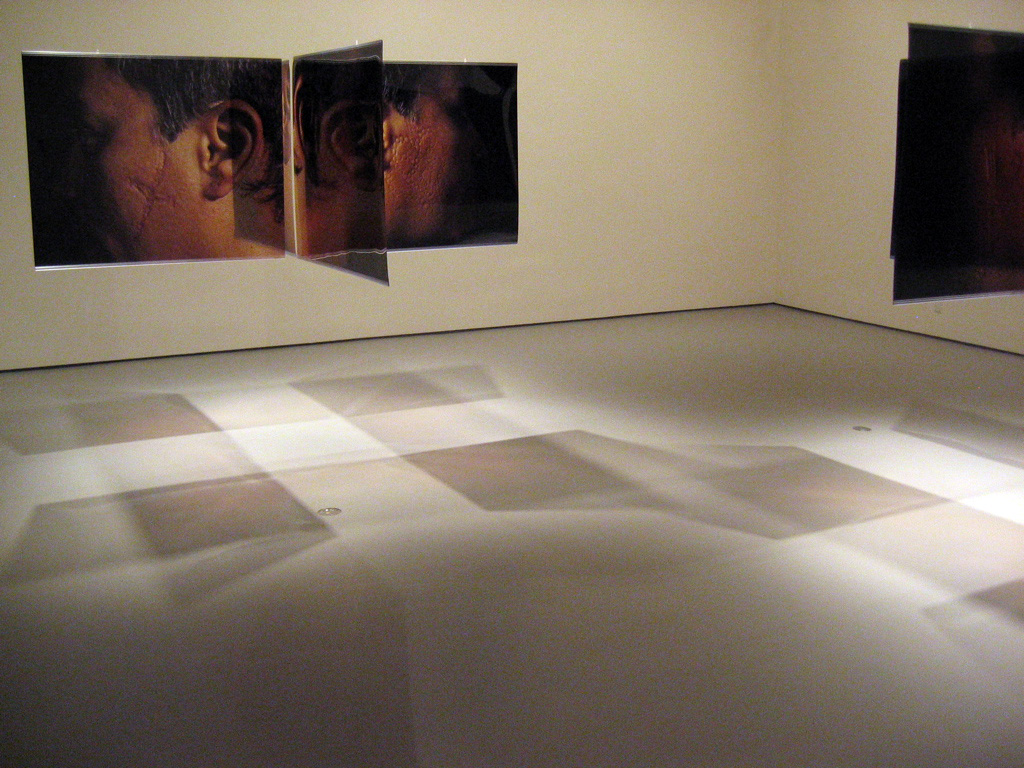
Installation view of Profile (2002)

== Notable works ==
Berni Searle utilizes large scale digital photographic prints, found materials, and time-based media such as film to capture her work. Searle's work encompasses performative narratives and the self as a figure to embody history, land, memory and place. Searle is known for utilizing her own body in her pieces to highlight her own bodily agency and to construct and deconstruct identities around race and gender. Spices are a common motif in her work.

=== Colour Me series ===
Searle's series Colour Me is a body of work created between 1998 and 2000 for which she had herself photographed, her body outlined or adorned with different colored spices, to create life size or larger than life digital color prints. The colored spices allude to the racial classifications imposed under apartheid, and also the movement of both spices and slaves during colonial regimes. Many works in the Colour Me series also feature measuring tools, signifying the colonial, pseudoscientific gaze on black bodies. Her work deals with South African History, the awareness of one's own skin color, and the consumption of a woman's body as a commodity; the confrontational power of that same body in which so many myths, desires, and necessities reside.

=== Discoloured series ===
With her installation A Darker Shade of Light (1999), Searle responds to the Truth and Reconciliation Commission, which was intended to bring justice to the victims of violent crimes that occurred in South Africa during the apartheid era. This work is made up of close-up photos of parts of Searle's naked body - including images of the nape of the neck, the back, the palms, and the soles of the feet -, all of which are covered in henna powder to mimic the appearance of bruising. By altering the appearance of her body and positioning herself in ways that reference the victimization of women, Searle creates the types of images that many saw to be lacking in the testimonies at the TRC hearings. Thus, the work examines the issue of visibility with regard to trauma and the abuse of women.

=== A Place in the Sun ===
Searle's installation A Place in the Sun (2019) consists of four screens that play video of a drained swimming pool in the socially diverse Maitland community in Cape Town throughout the day. The video offers glimpses into the nostalgic feelings of residents of the community through the music and sounds of children playing over the desolate space as the artist and other figures occasionally pass in and out of the frame. As the scene shifts to nighttime, fire breaks out in the previously solemn setting while the ambient sounds of the community continue, eventually being overtaken by police sirens. Through this piece, Searle calls to attention the issues of insufficient funding and housing in communities like Maitland, as well as the political protests that had taken place in South Africa in recent years.

== Awards ==
- UNESCO/AICA Award at the Cairo Biennale (1998)
- Minister of Culture prize at the Dak’art Biennale (2000)
- Civitella Ranieri Fellowship (2001)
- Standard Bank Young Artist Award (2003)
- Rockefeller Bellagio Creative Arts Fellow (2014)

=== Nominations and shortlists ===
- FNB VITA Art Award (2000)
- Daimler-Chrysler Award for South African Contemporary Art (2000)
- Artes Mundi award (2004)

== Selected exhibitions ==
=== Solo exhibitions ===
- 1992: Passing Through, Canberra Gallery, Australian National University, Canberra, Australia
- 1999: Colour Me, Mark Coetzee Fine Art Cabinet, Cape Town, South Africa
- 2000: INOVA (Institute of the Visual Arts), University of Wisconsin, Wisconsin, United States
- 2011: Interlaced, De Hallen, the Belfry Tower, Bruges; Museum voor Moderne Kunst Arnhem (MMKA), Arnhem, Netherlands; Frac Lorraine, Metz, France (with new commissioned work)
- 2011: Shimmer, Stevenson Gallery, Cape Town
- 2012: Black Smoke Rising Trilogy, Ron Mandos gallery, Amsterdam, Netherlands
- 2013: Refuge, La Galerie Particuliere, Paris

=== Group exhibitions ===
- 1997: Life's Little Necessities, 2nd Johannesburg Biennale, The Castle, Cape Town, South Africa
- 7th International Cairo Biennale, Cairo, Egypt
- 1999: Staking Claims, The Granary, Cape Town, South Africa
- 1999: Postcards from South Africa, Axis Gallery, New York, United States
- 1999: Emergence, Traveling exhibition
- 1999: Truth Veils, Gertrude Posel Gallery, University of Witwatersrand, Johannesburg, South Africa
- 1999: Isintu: Ceremony, Identity, and Community, South African National Gallery, Johannesburg, South Africa
- 1999: Bloodlines/Bloedlyn, Klein Karoo Kunste Fees, Oudsthoorn, South Africa
- 2000: Dak'art 2000, Dakar, Senegal
- 2000: Insertion, Apex Gallery, New York, United States
- 2001: 49th Venice Biennale, Venice, Italy
- 2005: 51st Venice Biennale, Venice, Italy
- 2010-2011: Pictures by Women: A History of Modern Photography, Museum of Modern Art, New York City, New York, United States
- 2010–2011: The Dissolve, SITE Santa Fe, 8th International Biennial, Santa Fe, New Mexico
- 2011: Figures & Fictions: Contemporary South African Photography, Victoria and Albert Museum, London, 2011
- 2011: She Devil 5 Museum of Contemporary Art of Rome (MACRO), Rome, Italy
- 2012: The Human Condition, Bradbury Gallery, State University, Arkansas
- 2013: Terminal. As part of the program LAND, various locations across the City of Cape Town. Organized by GIPCA, curated by Jean Brundrit and Svea Josephy and Adrienne van Eeden Wharton
- 2014: Public Intimacy. Art and Other Ordinary Acts in South Africa, Yerba Buena Center for the Arts in conjunction with San Francisco Museum of Modern Art, San Francisco, CA
- 2014: Earth Matters, National Museum of African Art, Smithsonian Institution, Washington D.C.
- 2015: Distance and Desire: Encounters with the African Archive, The Walther Collection, Ulm, Germany. Curated by Tamar Garb
- 2019: Made Routes: Mapping and Making, Richard Saltoun Gallery, London, UK. Curated by Tamar Garb
- 2019: Yithi Laba. A group exhibition by Lindeka Qampi, Neo Ntsoma, Zanele Muholi, Ruth Seopedi Motau and Berni Searle at Market Photo Workshop, Johannesburg

== Bibliography ==
- Perryer, Sophie (2004). 10 Years 100 Artists: Art in a Democratic South Africa. Cape Town: Struik. ISBN 1-86872-987-7. Archived from the original on 2 April 2015.
