= Senzeni Marasela =

South African visual artist (born 1977)

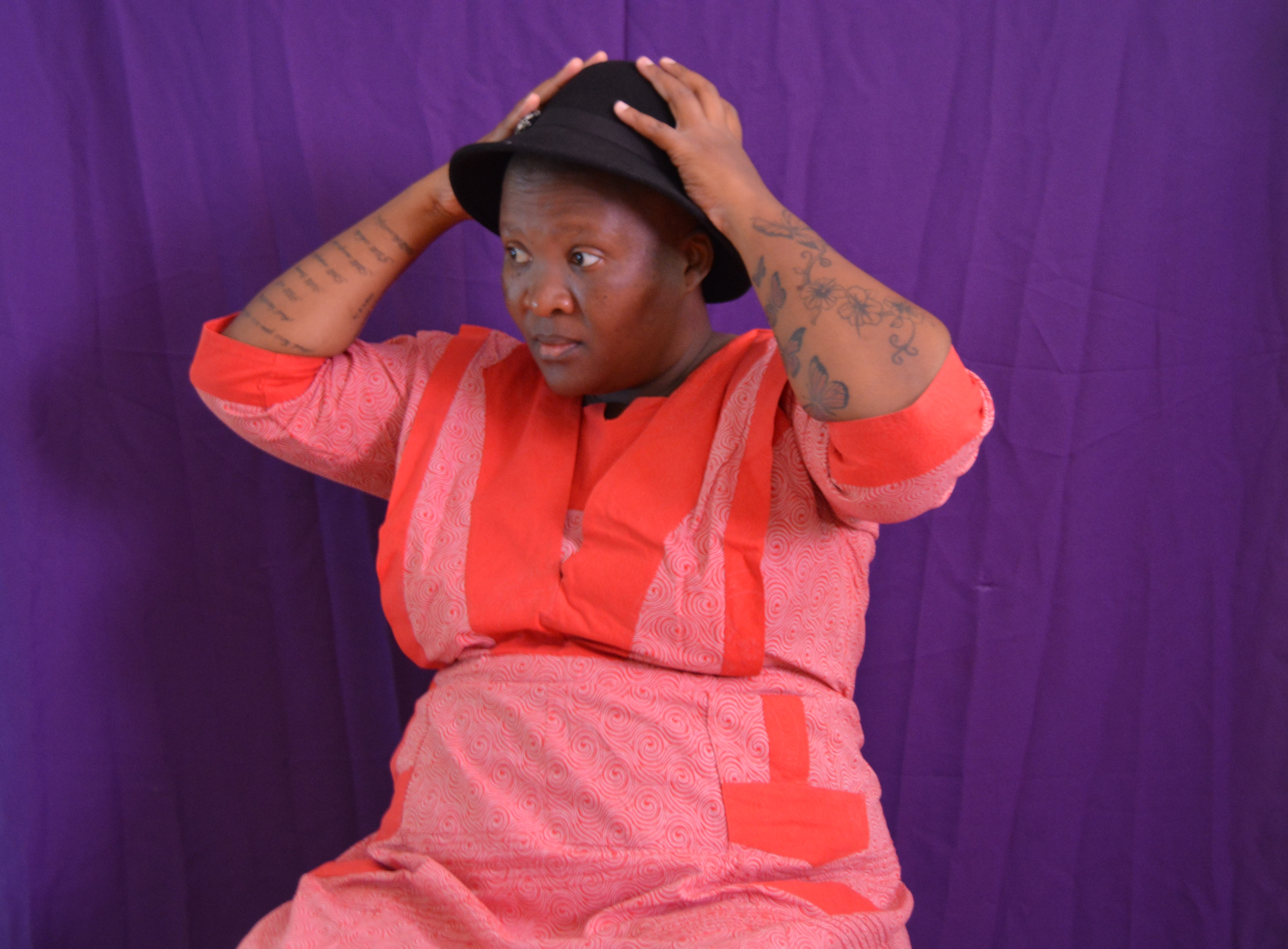
- Marasela in 2019
- Born: 11 February 1977; Thokoza, South Africa
- Education: University of the Witwatersrand
- Occupations: artist, author
- Years active: 1997–present
- Notable work: Ijermani Lam (2013-2019)

Senzeni Marasela (born 11 February 1977) is a South African visual artist born in Thokoza who works across different media, combining performance, photography, video, prints, textiles, and embroidery in mixed-media installations. She obtained a BA in Fine Arts at the Wits School of Arts, University of the Witwatersrand, Johannesburg in 1998.

Her work has been exhibited in South Africa, Europe, and the United States, and is part of local and international collections, including the Museum of Modern Art and the Newark Museum.

== Education ==
Senzeni Marasela attended Jonimfundo, a school, in Vosloorus, where she matriculated in 1994. After a one-day trip to the University of the Witwatersrand in 1992, she decided to enroll there. She developed her multimedia and performative practice at the Wits School of Arts, graduating in 1998.

== Career ==
Marasela's work has been regularly shown since the Martienssen Prize Exhibition in 1997. She was accepted as an exhibiting artist by the Goodman Gallery in Johannesburg after being part of the group exhibition, Not Quite a Christmas Exhibition. She had her first solo exhibition at the Iziko South African National Gallery's Fresh exhibition series in 2000, which was part of a residency program. In 2003, she started a long-term performance entitled Theodorah comes to Johannesburg, which is based on stories her mother told about her 11-hour travel from Mvenyane to Johannesburg.

In 2011, Marasela began work as a full-time artist and was part of the Johannesburg Pavilion at the 56th Venice Biennale in 2015.

== Work ==
Marasela's mother's collection of doilies and Victorian lace works, handed down in her family, influenced her artistic practice. Marasela's work explores the experiences of Black, South African women across a range of media. This includes photography, video, prints, and mixed-media installations that involve textiles and embroidery. In her work, she translates memories of struggle and urbanization through the use of material culture and narratives. For example, the use of the color red refers to cultural memories around the time of the "red dust," a period of drought in the early 1930s in South Africa. Her performances interweave these elements and multi-media works, making visible the dimension of the every day through objects and clothes.

She is known for her six-year performance work Ijermani Lam which "materializes the condition of waiting" by wearing the same red dress every day from 1 October 2013 to 1 October 2019. The original dresses were part of the group the exhibition, "Made Visible. Contemporary South African Fashion and Identity" at the Museum of Fine Arts, Boston (February–May 2019). Her work taps into cultural memories, such as using archival materials like newspapers and photographs printed onto colonial textiles. It tells stories of black women in South Africa, such as Sarah Baartman and Marasela's mother, Theodorah Mpofukazi Marasela, through series such as Covering Sarah Baartman (2011), Sarah, Senzeni and Theodorah come to Joburg (2011), Theodorah, (2005), Waiting for Gebane (2017), Izithombe Zendawo Esizithandayo (2017). Marasela's artwork builds an "intimate archive", giving voice to experiences of black women.

== Exhibitions ==
- 2018: Senzeni Marasela, Waiting for Gebane. Dolly Parton. Toffee Gallery, Darling, South Africa
- 2011: Sarah, Theodora and Senzeni in Johannesburg. Art On Paper, Johannesburg, South Africa
- 2010: Senzeni Marasela. Beyond Booty: Covering Sarah Baartman and other Tales. Axis Gallery, New York and New Jersey, in association with submerged art, USA
- 2009: Witness. Art on Paper, Johannesburg, South Africa
- 2009: Oh my God you look like shit. Who let you out of the house looking like that?, solo performance, Sternersen Museum, Oslo, Norway
- 2009: JONGA – Look at Me! A Museum of Women, Dolls and Memories. Devon Arts residency, Devon, England
- 2005: Theodorah and Other Women. Art on Paper, Johannesburg, South Africa
- 2004: Three Women, Three Voices. Johannesburg Art Gallery, Johannesburg, South Africa
- 2002: Upstream Public Art Project. Amsterdam, the Netherlands
- 2000: Fresh. South African National Gallery, Cape Town, South Africa

=== Group exhibitions ===
- 2019: I am… Contemporary Women Artists of Africa. Smithsonian National African Museum, Washington, USA
- 2018–2019: Soft Power. Transpalette, Bourges, France
- 2018: Ravelled Threads. Sean Kelly Gallery, New York, USA
- 2017: Africa. Raccontare un Mondo. Padiglione d'Arte Contemporanea, Milan, Italy
- 2016: KIN, HANGAR. Centro de Investigação Artística, Lisbon, Portugal
- 2014: Ik Beem Afrikander. Johannesburg, South Africa
- 2014: Contemporary South African Art Exhibition. Yale University, New Haven, USA
- 2014: Nomad Bodies. Royal Academy of Fine Art, Antwerp, Belgium – Fried Contemporary, Pretoria, South Africa
- 2013: Weather Report. University of Potchefstroom, North-West Province, South Africa
- 2013: Africa curating Africa. ABSA Contemporary, Johannesburg, South Africa, (Travelling Exhibition)
- 2012: Ongoing. Present Tense: Arts of Contemporary Africa. The Newark Museum of Art, New Jersey, USA
- 2012: Red. 5 Pieces Gallery, Berne, Switzerland
- 2012: ME1. Fried Contemporary, Pretoria, South Africa
- 2011: New traditions: Louise McCagg & Senzeni Marasela. Collaboration at A.I.R. Gallery, in Association with Axis Gallery and Alma-on-Dobbin, New York, USA
- 2011: Impressions from South Africa: Printed Art/1965 to Now. The Paul J. Sachs Prints and Illustrated Books Galleries, Museum of Modern Art, New York, USA
- 2010–2013: Translations into Jewellery. Everard Read Gallery, Johannesburg, South Africa – Standard Bank Gallery, Johannesburg, South Africa
- 2009–2011: DARKROOM: South African Photography and New Media 1950 – Present. Virginia Museum of Fine Arts, Richmond, USA – Birmingham Museum of Art, Alabama, USA
- 2009: Dystopia. Unisa Art Gallery, Pretoria, South Africa – Museum Africa, Johannesburg, South Africa – Oliewenhuis Art Museum, Mangaung, Bloemfontein, South Africa – Jan Colle Galerij, Ghent, Belgium.
- 2009: Beauty and Pleasure. Stenersen Museum, Oslo, Norway
- 2009: Unbounded: New Art for a New Century. Newark Museum, New Jersey, USA
- 2009: Developing Democracy: A New Focus on South African Photography. Kyle Kauffman Gallery, New York, USA
- 2008: Thami Mnyele and Medu Art Ensemble Retrospective Exhibition, Johannesburg Art Gallery, Johannesburg, South Africa
- 2008: Black Womanwood: Icons, Images and Ideologies of the African Body. Hood Museum of Art, Dartmouth College, The Davis Museum and Cultural Center, Wellesley College, and the San Diego Museum of Art, San Diego
- 2007: Jive Soweto. Hector Pietersen Museum, Soweto, South Africa
- 2006: Ranjith Kally, Senzeni Marasela and Ruth Seopedi Motau at Goodman Gallery
- 2006: Erase Me from Who I Am. Las Palmas, Canary Islands, Spain
- 2005: Click. Goodman Gallery, Johannesburg, South Africa
- 2004: Ten Voices, Ten Years of Democracy. Public Art project of the City of Rome, Italy
- 2004: Public Private. Auckland Public Gallery, Auckland, New Zealand
- 2003: The Body and the Archive. Artists' Space, New York, USA
- 2002: Aids in Africa. Wellesley College, Wellesley, Massachusetts, USA
- 2001: Sample E.C. Gertrude Posel Gallery, University of the Witwatersrand, Johannesburg, South Africa
- 2001: Open House Exhibition. Umea Art Academy, Umea, Sweden
- 2000: Margins in the Mainstream. Namibian National Gallery, Windhoek, Namibia
- 2000: Translation/Seduction/Displacement: Post-Conceptual and Photographic Work. South African Artists, White Box, New York, USA
- 2000: Portrait Afrika. Haus der Kulturen Der Welt, Berlin, Germany
- 2000: Art Region End of Africa. Listafen Reykjavikur Kjarvalsstadir, Reyjavik, Iceland
- 1999: Market Photo Workshop Exhibition. Rembrandt van Rijn Gallery, Johannesburg, South Africa
- 1999: Postcards from South Africa. Axis Gallery, Johannesburg, South Africa
- 1999: Truth Veils. Getrude Posel Gallery, Johannesburg, South Africa
- 1998: Family Ties. Sandton Civic Gallery, Johannesburg, South Africa
- 1998: Democracy's Images. Bildmusset, Umea, Sweden
- 1998: Women's Voices. Mercedes Benz Museum, Stuttgart, Germany
- 1997: Not Quite a Christmas Exhibition. Goodman Gallery, Johannesburg, South Africa
- 1997: Martienseen Prize Exhibition. Gertrude Posel Gallery, Johannesburg, South Africa

=== Biennales ===
- 2005: Beijing Biennale, South African Representative, Beijing, China
