= Neo Ntsoma =

South African photographer (born 1972)

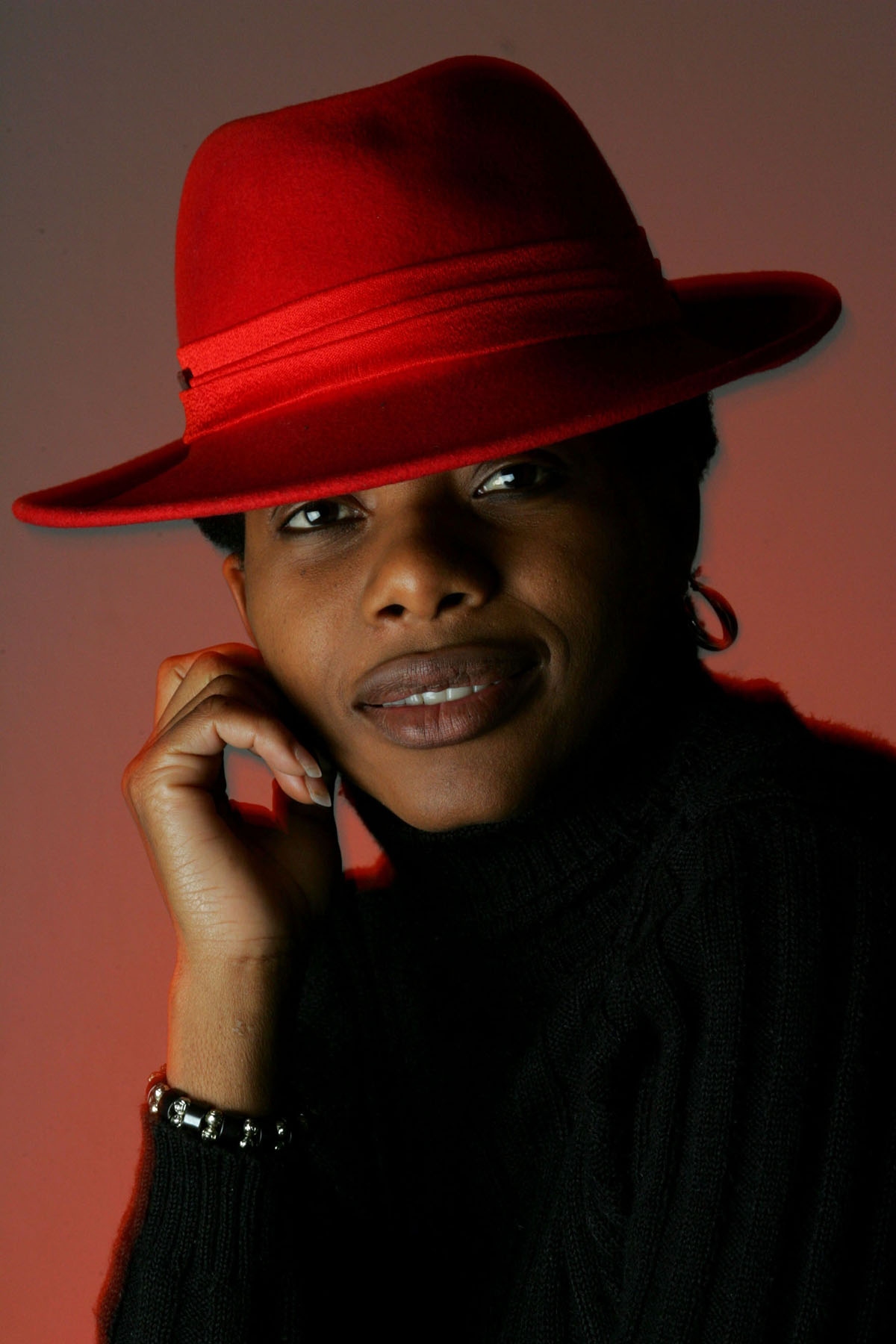
- Born: 27 December 1972 (age 52); Vryburg, South Africa
- Education: Technikon Pretoria, Peninsula Technikon
- Occupation(s): Portraiture, photojournalism
- Years active: 1992–present

Neo Ntsoma (born 27 December 1972) is a South African photographer known for her photojournalism, portraiture, music and popular culture photography. Born in Vryburg and brought up in the rural areas of Mafikeng in the North West Province, her fascination about films was triggered at an early age. Growing up in the apartheid era and seeing the negative portrayal images of black South Africans and the lack of participation of black women in a media industry dominated by white males, this reinvigorated her to want to make change, however it was not an easy dream to fulfill due to race restrictions at the time. Ntsoma attended St Mary's High School where she would be introduced to music, dance and drama, this is where she knew her career path was different from her peers. Despite several setbacks throughout her life she kept on pursuing her dream of being a photographer and succeeded. Ntsoma is known for her photographs that stand out for the odd angles from which they are taken and the way she plays with what is in focus in the photos and what is not. Besides being a photographer she has become an enthusiastic mentor for young photojournalists.

== Early years ==
Born in Vryburg and brought up in the rural areas of Mafikeng in the North West Province. Ntsoma is last of the third children born to Olefile Ntsoma and Nomalanga Maria Ntsoma née Hlabangane. Photography is a profession she fell into by accident, a profession not known for black women at that time. Ntsoma began her studies at Peninsula Technikon in 1992. Her initial interest was in Film and Television. she never picked up a camera prior to her enrolment at the Technikon. She later moved to Pretoria Technikon between 1994 and 1995 to further her studies specialising in Fashion and Advertising although she was denied the opportunity to graduate.

== Career ==
Despite challenges and setbacks on her journey, in 1998 Ntsoma became the first black woman photographer to work for one of the biggest newspapers in South Africa, The Star. Although Ntsoma never felt discriminated by her colleagues whom were mainly white and male, she felt the need to constantly prove herself to gain the recognition in the industry. As Ntsoma explains in her artistry statement,

I used to take pictures to make people believe in me. Now, I take pictures to make people believe in the subject of my photographs. My aim is to share my point of view about something, and also what I am feeling about it. But what's important for me is to capture the spirit and soul of the subject I am photographing.

Between 2002 and 2003, Ntsoma's involvement with Majority World began when she was a tutor at Pathshala South Institute of Photography in Bangladesh, which was led by Shahidul Alam. Alam assisted with publicizing work of artists from majority world countries, which included Africa. Majority World publicized her work and gave her opportunities to showcase them in exhibitions and publications globally. Ntsoma mentioned, "I can proudly say that people know of my work in countries that I cannot even read the language."

In 2004, Neo Ntsoma became the first woman recipient of the Mohamed Amin Award, the CNN African Journalist of the Year Photography Prize for her photo essay entitled, 'Their World in Flames'. Over the years her career has also spanned to fine arts and celebrity photography.

Ntsoma co-authored Women by Women: 50 Years of Women's Photography in South Africa with Robin Comley, George Hallett, and Penny Siopis. It was commissioned by the South African Ministry of Arts and Culture as a celebration of the 50th anniversary of the 1956 women's march on the Union Buildings.

In 2007, Ntsoma founded Neo Ntsoma Productions, a visual communications and production company owned and managed entirely by black women. Ntsoma's team consists of photographers, video technologists, editors, visual communication strategists, writers, and consultants who work in industrial and corporate sectors alike. The company also provides entrepreneurial workshops and private mentorship programs for aspiring photographers.

In 2018 photojournalist, Neo Ntsoma was part of a discussion, along with fellow panelist, on development on the African continent - at the Yale University Art Gallery.

== Awards ==
- 2005 National Geographic All Roads Photo Program Award
- 2005 Mondi Shanduka Newspaper Awards (Premier Award Winner – Photography)
- 2005 Fuji Southern Africa Press Awards – (Picture Story Runner-up)
- 2005 Fuji South Africa Professional Awards – GOLD Fine Art
- 2005 Fuji South Africa Professional Awards – SILVER Fine Art
- 2005 Fuji South Africa Professional Awards – BRONZE Manipulation
- 2005 Fuji South Africa Professional Awards – SILVER Automotive
- 2004 CNN – Mohammed Amin Award (First woman recipient)
- 2004 Fuji Southern Africa Press Photographer of the Year (Runner-up)
- 2004 Fuji Southern Africa Press Awards – (Picture Story – Winner)
- 2004 Fuji African Press Photo Awards- VISA POUR L'IMAGE (Runner – Up)
- 2004 Fuji African Press Photo Awards- VISA POUR L'IMAGE (News – Runner-up)
- 2003 Fuji South Africa Press Awards (Highly Commended – Picture Story)
- 2002 Fuji South Africa Press Awards (Highly Commended – Feature Single)
- 2002 Fuji South Africa Press Awards (Judges Selection)
- 2002 Mondi Paper Newspaper Awards – (Finalist)

== Honours ==
- 2007 Member of the judging jury – Fuji Southern Africa Press Awards
- 2006 MTN Women in the Media Award (Finalist)
- 2006 True Love magazine 100 women who have made an impact local and globally.
- 2006 Cosmopolitan magazine "30 Awesome Women, an annual feature in Cosmopolitan magazine, in celebration of South Africa's outstanding women achievers."
- 2005 The first photographer from the Southern Hemisphere to have a picture selected to go on the front cover of One World Calendar.
- 2004 Time magazine Pictures of the week (23–29 August)
- 2004 Cosmopolitan magazine "30 Awesome Women, an annual feature in Cosmopolitan magazine, in celebration of South Africa's outstanding women achievers."

== Exhibitions ==
- All Roads Film Festival, Los Angeles
- Santa Fe Film Festival, New Mexico
- International Women's Day, Toronto
- Chobi Mela - the South Asia Festival of Photography
- Rome Festival of Photography

== Group exhibitions ==
- Yithi Laba. A group exhibition by Lindeka Qampi, Neo Ntsoma, Zanele Muholi, Ruth Seopedi Motau and Berni Searle at Market Photo Workshop, Johannesburg
