= Andrew Tshabangu =

South African photographer (born 1966)

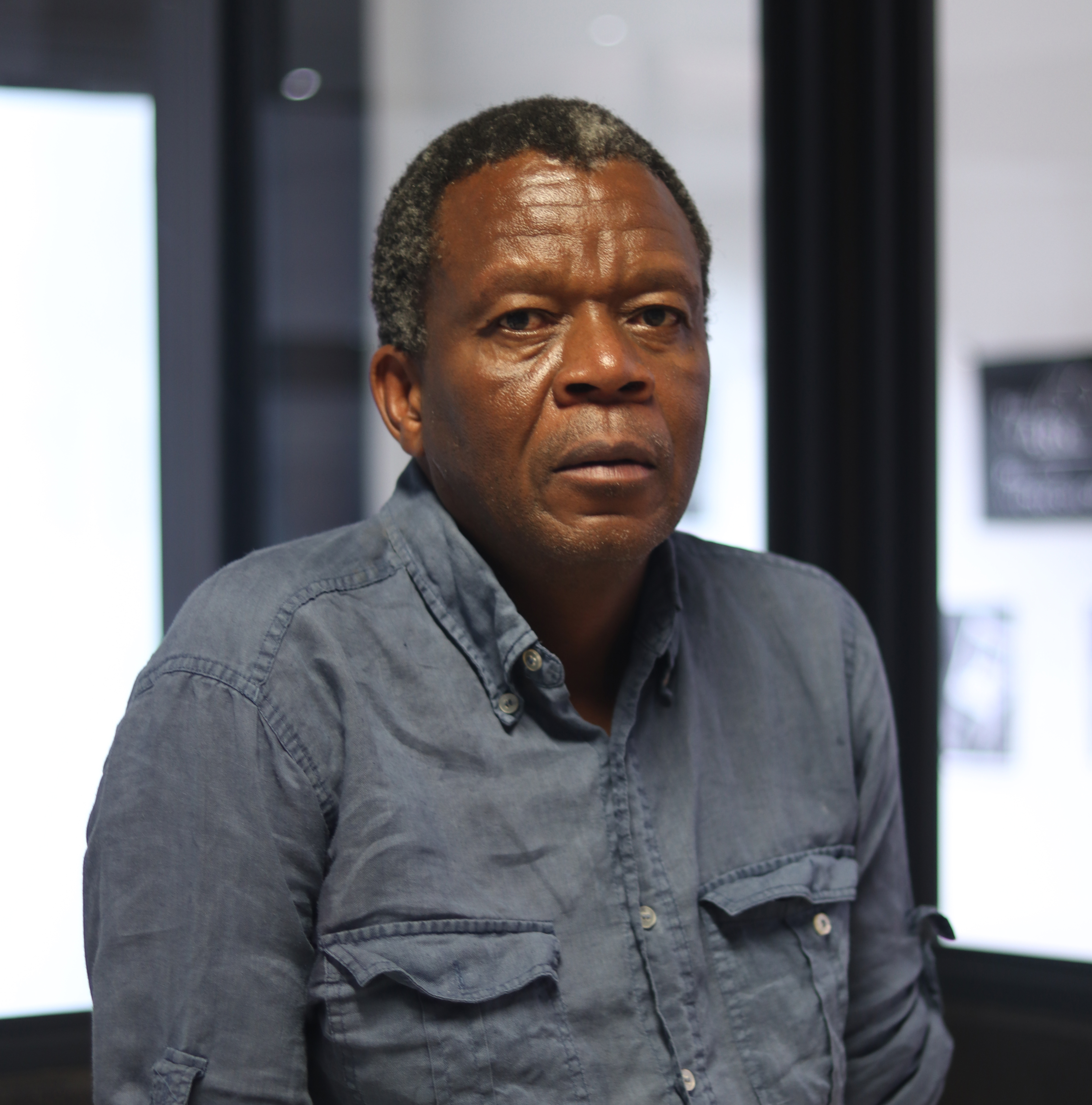
- Andrew Tshabangu
- Born: 28 November 1966 (age 59); Dube, Soweto
- Known for: Photography

Andrew Tshabangu (born 28 November 1966) is a South African photographer born in Dube, Soweto. He is known for his black-and-white social documentary photographic work which was shown in a largescale retrospective entitled Footprints at Standard Bank Gallery from February to April 2017, and which was accompanied by a book publication.

== Early life ==
Andrew Tshabangu was born in Dube, Soweto on 28 November 1966. Tshabangu's mother hails from the Rustenburg area whereas his father originates from the Vaal. He is the last born of five children, with three brothers and one sister. However his sister has since died. He attended Thabisang Primary School and Phefeni Senior Secondary School, both situated in Soweto.

== Career ==
Tshabangu has stated that photography was not his first choice as a profession, he was initially interested pursuing a number of other careers. In his early life he gained an interest in teaching, he then birthed an interest in theatre which resulted in him applying to the University of the Witwatersrand to study dramatic arts. However, he was not accepted when he auditioned for admission. There were other interests such as becoming a banker and joining a seminary to study priesthood which also didn't come to fruition. The artist we see today was harnessed by the Alexandra Community Art Centre during his time there in 1990, where he received his first lessons in visual literacy and photography. He also notes his classmates at the Alexandra Community Art Centre, as notable influences his photographic practice alongside the literature he consumed. After his time at the Alexandra Community Art Centre he did freelance work for a period of 8 months at New Nation. Tshabangu taught photography at the Children's Photography Workshop and the Market Photo Workshop. He has facilitated photographic workshops in Kenya, Ethiopia, Cameroon, Mozambique, Reunion and Guyana, and participated in residencies in Reunion, London, New York and Nairobi. His work is shown internationally in exhibitions and numerous publications.

== Book ==
- Footprints

== Publications ==
- Godby, Michael (ed.) (2017) Incomparable: The Art of Andrew Tshabangu in Context. Johannesburg: Fourthwall Books, ISBN 978-0-9947009-2-6.
