= Photography in South Africa =

Photography in South Africa has a lively culture, with many accomplished and world-renowned practitioners. Since photography was first introduced to the Cape Colony through the colonising powers, photography has variously been used as a weapon of colonial control, a legitimating device for the apartheid regime, and, in its latest incarnation, a mechanism for the creation of a new South African identity in the age of democracy, freedom and equality.

== Early photography ==
Photography arrived in South Africa with the British and Dutch colonists in the 19th Century. Early ethnographic photography, conducted primarily by anthropologists and missionaries, documented the native populations. The collections from this time are often critiqued as being exploitative projects of colonial domination, essentialising the native Khoikhoi and San populations of the Cape in order to legitimate ideologies of racial hierarchies that underpinned the colonial endeavour.

== Resistance photography ==
Photographers played a pivotal role, during apartheid, of documenting and communicating the liberation struggle to the outside world. The term resistance photography arose to describe work that challenged the beliefs, policies or actions of the apartheid government. Apartheid, a violent system of harshly enforced racial segregation that characterised South African society from 1948–1994, was legitimated by a historically received discourse based on religious, racial, ethnic and social grounds. Visual culture, as popular medium of expression, was positioned either to reinforce or to subvert such discourses. Resistance photography came to disrupt this consensually validated rhetorical construction, by presenting the humanity of non-white racial groups in ways that contravene the racist ideologies of the apartheid state. Afrapix, a collective of photographers who were committed to using photography to oppose apartheid, was formed in 1982 by Omar Badsha, Leslie Lawson, Mxolisi Moyo, Biddy Partridge, Lloyd Spencer, and Paul Weinberg. The collective, which included more than twenty freelance photographers, produced the most significant visual record of resistance to apartheid.

== Contemporary photography ==
Photography in contemporary South Africa has developed into a lively and burgeoning cultural movement, which, since 1994, has exploded into a democratised and accessible form of artistic expression. The weight of its apartheid past no doubt heavily influences its present, and the legacy of resistance photography has transformed into an abiding focus on the ongoing social issues faced by the new South Africa. Popular themes include HIV/AIDS, racism and social inequality, the democratic transition, and persistent injustices of post-apartheid South Africa.

Graeme Williams’ exhibition entitled The Edge of Town is paradigmatic of this new movement, exploring the liminal spaces of informal settlements on the peri-urban fringes of contemporary metropolises such as Johannesburg, Cape Town and Durban. Through capturing these life-spaces, work such as Williams' personalises issues that too often become dehumanised. Anthropologist Johannes Fabian suggests that in the African context, such pop cultural expressions represent ‘moments of freedoms’, allowing for the conceptualisation and cultivation of alternative modes of being, that liberate the individual, albeit in fleeting, contestatory and conflictual spaces. Much South African photography such as Williams’ work, embodies Fabian's notion of ‘moments of freedom’, depicting lives both limited, but not completely contained by the harsh realities of life.

Moreover, South Africa's unique status as an African nation with incredible wealth and incredible poverty provides fertile ground for challenging discourses of afro-pessimism and neo-colonialist attitudes towards Africa. Exhibitions such as Swedish photographer Jens Assur's Africa is a Great Country, seek to dismantle essentialist notions of Africa as a poverty-stricken, war-torn continent, by drawing on impulses of the African Renaissance, to project images of everyday life, of a continent of real and normal people, whose lives are as rich and as varied as anyone's. As an influential voice on the continent, the artistic output of South Africa has a key role in forging new ways of imagining Africa that complicate received notions of a ‘struggling’ continent. Paul Weinberg's photo-essay Durban: Portrait of an African City exemplifies this new current of work that refuses to constrain engagement with African art to the familiar tropes of poverty and violence, depicting instead the dynamism and vivacity of life on the continent.

== Key institutions ==
The Market Photo Workshop was founded by South African photographer David Goldblatt in Johannesburg in 1989 and it has played a key role in the development of South African photography. Notable photographer who trained at the Market Photo Workshop include Jodi Bieber, Lebohang Kganye, Sabelo Mlangeni, and Zanele Muholi. Photography is also taught in Fine Art departments at universities in South Africa. The South African Centre for Photography is a Cape Town-based not-for-profit organisation that endeavours to promote a broader understanding of photography across the African continent through regular and accessible exhibitions and programs.

Professional photographers of Southern Africa is a representative body for practising photographers and other practitioners affiliated to the photography industry in South Africa that seeks to, amongst other aims, recognise and promote excellence in the field of Southern African photography.

The officially recognised body representing photographers in Southern Africa is the Photographic Society of South Africa. "The Photographic Society of South Africa aims to be the pre-eminent, internationally recognised, photographic society in South Africa serving the photographic community of South Africa." A not-for-profit organisation, it seeks to promote interest in, and standards of photography in South Africa. Amongst its official functions is the task of monitoring and censoring images deemed unfit for public viewing. The Annual General Meeting of the Society involves a Photographic Congress, giving exposure to photographers.

There is a rich array of educational and training opportunities for South African photographers. The Vega Photography School, located in Pretoria, Gauteng, offers the highest level photographic instruction in the country. The Stellenbosch Academy of Design and Photography is another of the nation's premier tertiary visual communication institutes, offering undergraduate and post-graduate courses, located in Stellenbosch, Western Cape. The College of Digital Photography, with campuses in Pretoria, Fourways, Cape Town and Saxonwold, offers specialised programs in photography and videography, designed for digital cameras.

Drum magazine is "a South African publication that became a powerful voice for Black urban culture and resistance during the apartheid era. Launched in 1951, it captured the vibrancy of township life, covering music, fashion, politics, and social issues." Drum magazine became an outlook for South African photographers to publish their photo's show casing the political consciousness of the country at the time.
