= Kris L. Hardin =

American anthropologist

Kris L. Hardin FRGS
- Born: March 7, 1953; Fresno, California, U.S.
- Died: August 21, 2012 (aged 59)
- Education: Indiana University
- Occupation: Anthropologist
- Spouse: Michael Katakis

Kris L. Hardin FRGS (March 7, 1953 – August 21, 2012), was a US-American anthropologist and writer. She was a Fellow of the Royal Geographical Society, and an associate professor of anthropology at the University of Pennsylvania. She carried out an extensive anthropological study in the Kono district of Sierra Leone, West Africa.

Hardin was born in Fresno, California, daughter of Douglas and Eleanor Hardin. She was awarded a PhD in anthropology from Indiana University, a Fulbright scholarship, a Rockefeller scholarship, and a fellowship by the Smithsonian Institution. Following completion of her formal studies, she spent several years doing fieldwork among the Kono people of Kainkordu, a Chiefdom of Sierra Leone in the Kono District.

Upon her return from Sierra Leone, she met, and later married, writer and photographer Michael Katakis, with whom she spent 25 years collaborating on projects throughout the world. Together, they produced exhibitions and books derived from their work.

In 2009, the results of their activities, comprising thousands of pages of field notes and photographs, were presented to the British Library. Interviews were held which included a joint interview with Katakis and Hardin and two individual life story interviews. An exhibition, Michael Katakis Photographs, was held in the British Library, which featured photographs from the projects "The Vietnam Veterans Memorial", "Troubled Land: 12 Days Across America" (a portrait of the US in the days after the September 11 attacks) and "A Time and Place Before War", which documented life in Sierra Leone before the outbreak of Sierra Leone Civil War in 1991.

Hardin was also a painter who produced work in oil and watercolor. In 1999, she was elected Fellow of the Royal Geographical Society, and in 2011 she was presented to Queen Elizabeth.

Hardin died on August 21, 2012, as a result of brain tumor.

== Bibliography ==
- The Aesthetics of Action: Continuity and Change in a West African Town, 1993, by Kris L. Hardin with photographs by Michael Katakis, 1993, Washington, DC.: Smithsonian Institution Press.
- African Material Culture, 1996, Mary Jo Arnoldi, Christraud M. Geary, Kris L. Hardin (eds), Bloomington: Indiana University Press.
- Photographs & words, 2011, by Michael Katakis, with additional text and materials by Kris L. Hardin), London, England: The British Library.
- A Time and Place Before War: Images and Reflections from a West African Town, photographs by Michael Katakis, Introduction by Kris Hardin, Ph.D., 2002, Bozeman, Montana: Sapere Press.
- The Vietnam Veterans Memorial, 1988, photographs by Michael Katakis, essay by Kris L. Hardin, Ph.D., New York: Crown Publishers Inc.
- Expedition, "Representing Africa: Whose Story Counts?", 1993, by Kris L Hardin Ph.D. with photographs by Michael Katakis, The University Museum of Archaeology and Anthropology, University of Pennsylvania, Volume 35, No. 3, 1993.
