= Ruth Seopedi Motau =

South African photographer (born 1968)

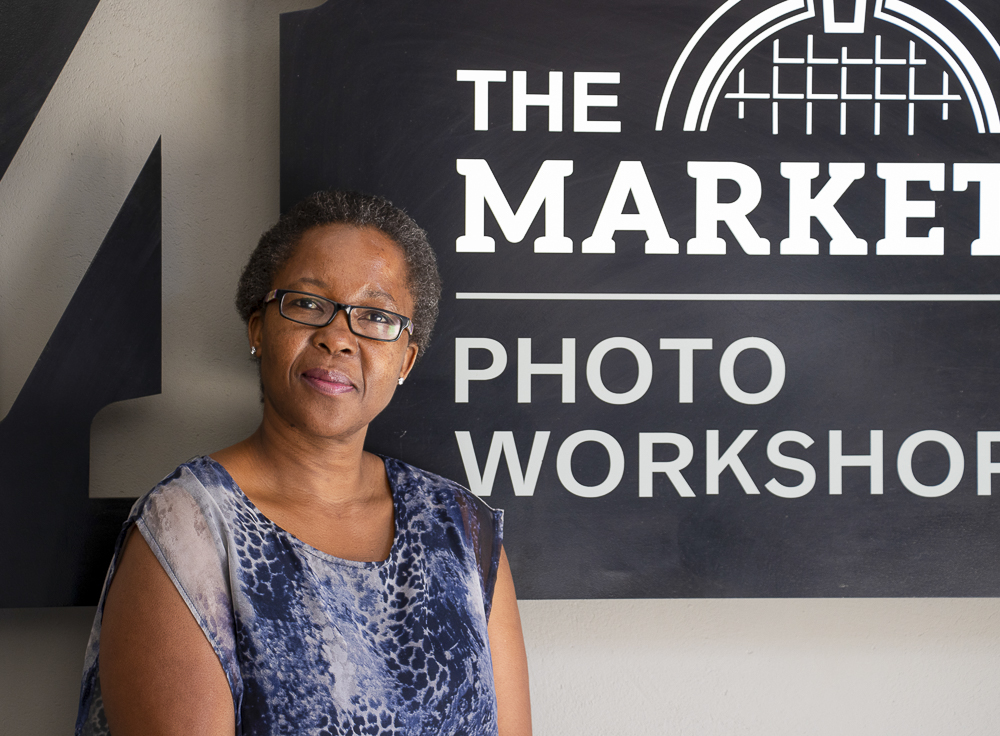
- Born: 8 March 1968 (age 58); Soweto
- Occupation: Photographer
- Years active: 1993–present
- Notable work: Shebeens (1998)

Ruth Seopedi Motau (born 8 March 1968) is a South African photographer currently living and working in Johannesburg, South Africa. Motau was the first black female photographer who was employed by a South African newspaper as photo editor. Her photography focuses on social documentary influenced by photojournalism and the marginalisation of black people and communities.

== Early life ==
Motau was born in Zone 2 in Meadowlands, Soweto. She is the last born of 9 children. She went to Tswelelang Primary School, followed by Thutolore Secondary School in Meadowlands, Soweto and Turret College which was set up by the South African Committee for Higher Education Trust (SACHED). Afterwards, she visited George Tabor College (now George Tabor Campus of South West Gauteng TVET College) in Soweto to learn fitting and turning which she did not pursue. Motau found her passion in 1990 when she started studying photography at the Market Photo Workshop in Johannesburg).

== Career ==
After completing the three-year course at Market Photo Workshop, Motau worked as intern at the Mail & Guardian newspaper (1993–1995), where she worked as photographer and picture editor from 1995 to 2002. She continued to work as picture editor for the South African newspapers The Sowetan (2004–2008) and for City Press (2008–2010). She has completed numerous documentary photo essays and series, among others Shebeens, Sonnyboy's Story, or Women and Municipal Service Delivery. Her work has been exhibited internationally and won numerous awards, its impact and legacy on documentary photography from South Africa is recognised through platforms such as the Photography Legacy Project (initiated by the Goodman Gallery, the David Goldblatt Legacy Trust and Wits Historical Papers).

== Methodology ==
Her work focusses on the everyday and the ordinary lives of South Africans. To gain the trust of the participants and the communities she is working in, she gets acquainted with them. She also tries her best to show the images to the people she photographed so that they are able to engage with the work. Motau references the former head of state Nelson Mandela as one of the people who also inspired her. She recounts how when she was tasked with photographing him, how he introduced himself even though it was very obvious who he was. Her work becomes visible through the humility in her attitude towards the people and stories she pursues, which are socio-political stories that effect our communities on a daily basis and that are usually overlooked for hard hitting tabloid stories.

== Awards ==
- 2001 SABC award for women who made a difference in media
- 1997 Freedom Forum Fellowship, Rhodes University

== Exhibitions ==
- Black Looks, White Myths, Johannesburg Biennale, 1995. Curated by Octavio Zaya, Danielle Tilkin and Tumelo Mosaka.
- Bienal de São Paulo, São Paulo, Brazil, 1995
- South African Family Stories: A Group Portrait IZIKO South African National Gallery, Cape Town, 2002; KIT Tropenmuseum, Amsterdam
- Ranjith Kally, Senzeni Marasela and Ruth Motau at Goodman Gallery, 2006
- Paris Photo international photography art fair, 2019, represented by Goodman Gallery, Johannesburg
- Yithi Laba, a group exhibition by Lindeka Qampi, Neo Ntsoma, Zanele Muholi, Ruth Motau and Berni Searle, Market Photo Workshop, Johannesburg, 2019
