= Michael Katakis =

American photographer

Michael Katakis FRGS (born 1952), is a writer, photographer, Fellow of the Royal Geographical Society and manager of Ernest Hemingway's literary estate. His photographs are represented in many institutions including the National Portrait Gallery (United States).

Katakis was born in Chicago, Illinois, an only child. His father emigrated from Greece shortly after World War II. His mother, who was the daughter of Greek immigrants, died when he was a boy.

Katakis began writing about 1975. He later started taking photographs and has always considered himself "a writer who happens to take pictures." He travelled extensively throughout the world, making contact with a wide range of cultures and geographic locations. He visited many countries including China, West Africa, Cuba, Hungary, Morocco, Turkey, the United States, South Korea, the Philippines, Taiwan, Italy, Greece, England, France and Spain. During this time he married Kris L. Hardin, an anthropologist, and they spent 25 years travelling together, collaborating on many projects and producing exhibitions and books derived from their work.

In 2009 Michael Katakis and Kris L. Hardin donated thousands of pages and photographs of their work to the British Library. The couple gave interviews, which were placed in the Oral History section of the library. In 2011 an exhibition, 'Michael Katakis Photographs', was held in the Folio Gallery of the library to coincide with the publication of "Photographs and Words," authored by Katakis and Hardin. The book featured photographs from the projects 'The Vietnam Veterans Memorial', 'Troubled Land: 12 Days Across America' (a portrait of the US in the days after the September 11 attacks) and 'A Time and Place Before War', which documented life in Sierra Leone before the outbreak of civil war in 1991). Details of these projects and the time spent in Sierra Leone by Katakis and Hardin, were covered in the interviews.

In 1999 Katakis was working with Ernest Hemingway's second son, Patrick Hemingway, on a collection of essays, when Katakis accepted an offer by Hemingway to manage Ernest Hemingway's literary estate.

The work of Michael Katakis has been translated into several languages including Greek, Bulgarian and Chinese and his photographs have been collected by institutions including the National Portrait Gallery in Washington D.C., the Victoria and Albert Museum, the British Library and Stanford University's Special Collections Department.

In 1999 Katakis was elected Fellow of the Royal Geographical Society, and in 2011 was presented to Her Majesty Queen Elizabeth II. In 2012 he was appointed Ambassador for the British Library and elected Director of Americans for the British Library.

== Bibliography ==
- The Vietnam Veterans Memorial, 1988, Photographs by Michael Katakis, Essay by Kris L. Hardin, Ph.D., New York: Crown Publishers Inc.
- Amnesty International Calendar, 1988, Cover Photograph: Sierra Leone by Michael Katakis, Golden Turtle Press, California.
- The Aesthetics of Action: Continuity and Change in a West African Town, 1993 by Kris L. Hardin with photographs by Michael Katakis, 1993, Washington, DC.: Smithsonian Institution Press.
- Sacred Trusts: Essays on Stewardship and Responsibility, 1993, Edited by Michael Katakis, Illustrations by Russell Chatham, Mercury House, San Francisco.
- Expedition, "Representing Africa: Whose Story Counts?", 1993, by Kris L Hardin Ph.D. with photographs by Michael Katakis, The University Museum of Archaeology and Anthropology, University of Pennsylvania, Volume 35, No.3, 1993.
- Excavating Voices: Listening to Photographs of Native Americans, Edited and with an Introduction by Michael Kataris, 1998, University of Pennsylvania Museum Publications.
- A Time and Place Before War: Images and Reflections from a West African Town, Photographs by Michael Katakis, Introduction by Kris Hardin, Ph.D., 2002, Bozeman, Montana: Sapere Press.
- Despatches, 2008, Foolscap Press, Santa Cruz, California.
- Traveller: Observations from an American in Exile, 2009, Burton & Park, San Francisco.
- Traveller: Observations from an American in Exile, Greek language edition, 2009, Kastaniotis Editions, Athens.
- Traveller: Observations from an American in Exile, Bulgarian language edition, 2009, Uniscorp Publishers, Sophia.
- Traveller: Observations from an American in Exile, Chinese language edition, 2011, Yilin Press, Beijing.
- Photographs & Words, 2011, by Michael Katakis with additional text and materials by Kris L. Hardin), London, England: The British Library.
- A Thousand Shards of Glass, 2014, Simon & Schuster, London.
