= Christraud M. Geary =

American cultural anthropologist, writer and curator

- Born: 1946 (age 79–80)
- Citizenship: USA
- Education: Goethe University Frankfurt, Germany, PhD in African Studies
- Years active: 1973–present
- Employer(s): National Museum of African Art, D.C., Museum of Fine Art, Boston
- Known for: Curatorer; Cultural anthropologist; Media studies scholar
- Notable work: Postcards from Africa: Photographers of the Colonial Era, In and Out of Focus: Images from Central Africa,1885–1960

Christraud M. Geary (born 1946) is a German-born American cultural anthropologist, scholar in African studies and art curator. She served as curator for the photographic archives at the National Museum of African Art in Washington, D.C. and until her retirement in 2013 as the first curator of African and Oceanic art at the Museum of Fine Arts in Boston.

In her research, Geary has investigated African art with a special focus on Cameroon as well as early photography in sub-Saharan Africa. She has curated public exhibitions and published catalogs about historical photographs from various regions of Africa. Her contributions to the study of historical and other photographs as valuable sources for African history have emphasized their importance for understanding cultural and social contexts.

== Life and career ==
Geary is a scholar and curator of the diverse history and art in sub-Saharan Africa with a special interest in the history of photography. She has contributed to the field through her research, publications, and curatorial work. Geary earned her PhD in cultural anthropology and African studies in 1973 from the University of Frankfurt, Germany, with a thesis on a chieftaincy in Weh, North West Province of Cameroon.

In the United States, she first served as curator at the Eliot Elisofon Photographic Archives at the National Museum of African Art of the Smithsonian Institution in Washington, D.C. Following this, she was the first curator of African and Oceanic art at the Museum of Fine Arts (MFA) in Boston. After 10 years in this position, she retired in 2013 as Teel Senior Curator Emerita at the MFA.

Geary has authored scholarly articles and publications as well as exhibition catalogs, including In and Out of Focus: Images from Central Africa, 1885–1960. This work, which explores the cultural and historical contexts of photography in central Africa, was published for an exhibition at the National Museum of African Art, shown from December 2002 to March 2003. Further, Geary has herself taken photographs in various African countries on her field trips. Among many photographs from other regions, these are accessible online at the Eliot Elisofon Photographic Archives.

=== Areas of scholarship ===
Following her earlier studies and work about the social history and art in sub-Saharan Africa, her main interests as scholar, exhibition curator and writer have included the relationships between Western as well as African photographers, their African subjects or objects, and the persons regarding their photographs. In these trifold complex relationships, the interpretation of the images depends on a multitude of factors, that may lead to diverse points of view and raise ethical questions about (post-)colonial dynamics of power, agency and ownership. This includes photography that allowed Africans to create and interpret images of themselves.

In 1986, Geary noted that archives of Africa and Europe have shown an increasing interest for visual documents of African history. Recording these documents and interpreting them has since become a concern for many scholars. However, although written sources had been thoroughly studied, scholarly work studying images had been scarce. According to Geary, historical photographs had often been neglected, leading her to write:

Considering that photography, beginning with the daguerrotype in 1839, virtually accompanied the exploration of the interior regions of Africa, the failure to exploit photographs systematically as source materials seems rather astonishing. This ultimately raises a very real concern about historical photographs taken in Africa. We should be well aware of the fact that all these images were created in a power relationship predicated on the colonial situation: the photographer/colonialist could impose and enforce his will if he so desired. [...] the conditions under which many historical and present-day photographs were taken in Africa need to be contemplated, and issues such as inherent racism and visual exploitation of those pictured need to be raised. Furthermore, we have yet to formulate a code of ethics concerning the use of this imagery in publications and exhibitions.

— Christraud M. Geary. Photographs as Materials for African History: Some Methodological Considerations.

In 2018, the Boston Museum of Fine Arts published the illustrated book Postcards from Africa: Photographers of the Colonial Era. The historical picture postcards had been selected from the museum's Leonard A. Lauder Postcard Archive that includes 4,300 images from Africa. In her introduction, Geary pointed out that the meanings of such photographs are multiple and can be interpreted in open-ended ways. As historical documents, they bear witness to colonial rule, the domination of native people, the extraction of natural resources and the work of missionaries to spread Christian faith. Further, from the end of the 19th century on, photographs and picture postcards became increasingly popular with visitors and residents of European colonies in Africa and elsewhere. Through improving and relatively cheap postal services, they created new forms of communication and served personal and political interests. Since then, these images have shaped the public vision of important historical changes in the lives of Africans.

Geary also called attention to the ethical debate about exhibiting and re-publications of images that sexualize and objectify the female body: “On the one hand, such depictions must be exposed in order to address and redress past practices; on the other, displaying them again in public forums such as books and exhibitions raises painful issues for scholars and museum curators, as well as for viewers in Africa and around the globe whose forebears appear in such images.”

In 2020, the Rietberg Museum in Zurich, Switzerland, acquired Geary's personal collection of 4,500 historical photographs. Images from this collection were shown in 2022 in the museum's exhibition "The Future is Blinking. Early Studio Photography from West and Central Africa" at the Rietberg Museum.

== Selected publications ==
=== As author ===
- Postcards from Africa: Photographers of the Colonial Era: Selections from the Leonard A. Lauder Postcard Archive. Boston: MFA Publications. 2018. ISBN 978-0-87846-855-3.
- Geary, Christraud M. (2017). "The image of the Black in early African photography". In Bindman, David; Blier, Suzanne; Gates Jr., Henry Louis (eds.). The Image of the Black in African and Asian Art. Cambridge, MA: Belknap Press of Harvard University Press. ISBN 9780674504394.
- Geary, Christraud M. (24 July 2013). "The Past in the Present: Photographic Portraiture and the Evocation of Multiple Histories in the Bamum Kingdom of Cameroon". In Peffer, John; Cameron, Elisabeth L. (eds.). Portraiture and Photography in Africa. Bloomington: Indiana University Press. ISBN 978-0-253-00872-5.
- Art in Cameroon: Sculptural Dialogues. Purchase, NY. 2011.
- Bamum. Milan: 5 Continents Editions. 2011.
- with Genevieve McMillan, Stéphanie Xatart. (2007). Material Journeys : Collecting African and Oceanic Art, 1945–2000; Selections from the GenevièVe McMillan Collection. Boston, Mass.: Museum of Fine Arts Publications.
- with Michael Gunn, William Teel, and Stéphanie Xatart. (2006). From the South Seas : Oceanic Art in the Teel Collection. 1st ed. Boston, New York: MFA Publications.
- Geary, Christraud M. (2005). "Pygmy images and the making of Madami, a memoir by Anne Eisner Putnam and Allan Keller (1954)". In McDonald, Christie (ed.). Images of Congo: Anne Eisner's art and ethnography, 1946 – 1958. Milan: 5 Continents. ISBN 88-7439-220-6.
- Cameroon: Art and Kings. Zurich: Museum Rietberg. 2008. ISBN 978-3-907077-35-1.
- with Krzysztof Pluskota: In and Out of Focus: Images from Central Africa,1885-1960. Washington D.C. / London: National Museum of African Art and Wilson Publishers, 2003.
- Geary, Christraud M. (2000). "Photographing in the Cameroon Grassfields, 1970 to 1984". African Arts. 33 (4): 70–96. doi:10.2307/3337793. JSTOR 3337793.
- "Views from Outside and Inside: Representations of Madagascar and the Malagasy, 1648-1935." Christine Kreamer and Sarah Fee (eds.) Objects as Envoys: Cloth, Imagery and Diplomacy in Madagascar, Seattle: University of Washington Press, pp. 148–179, 1998.
- “Early Images from Benin at the National Museum of African Art, Smithsonian Institution.” African Arts, vol. 30, no. 3, 1997, p. 44. doi:10.2307/3337499
- Geary, Christraud M. (1991). "Old Pictures, New Approaches: Researching Historical Photographs". African Arts. 24 (4): 36–98. doi:10.2307/3337042. ISSN 0001-9933. JSTOR 3337042.
- Geary, Christraud M. (1991). "Missionary Photography: Private and Public Readings". African Arts. 24 (4): 48–100. doi:10.2307/3337044. JSTOR 3337044.
- Geary, Christraud M. (1986). "Photographs as Materials for African History: Some Methodological Considerations". History in Africa. 13: 89–116. doi:10.2307/3171537. ISSN 0361-5413. JSTOR 3171537.
- Palace and Chieftaincy in Weh (North West Province, Cameroon). Paideuma, 31, 183–201, 1985.
- Jenkins, Paul; Geary, Christraud (August 1985). "Photographs from Africa in the Basel Mission Archive". African Arts. 18 (4): 56. doi:10.2307/3336258. JSTOR 3336258.

=== As editor ===
- with Virginia Webb (eds.) Delivering Views: Distant Cultures in Early Postcards. Washington, D.C.: Smithsonian Institution Press. 1998.

== Reception ==
Based on her work in prestigious museums and as scholar on the visual anthropology of Africa, Geary has been called "one of the world's specialists of photography in Africa" and "one of the pioneers of the discipline."

Writing a peer review of Geary's In and out of Focus. Images from Central Africa, social anthropologist Jean-François Werner remarked the "rich iconography" and her methodological approach for explaining the many ways of social usage to which the photographic image lends itself. The reviewer further remarked that such images were originally produced by missionaries, soldiers, and anthropologists. Later, these images had been transferred from one medium to another (exhibitions, publications, postcards, stamps) in a never-ending recycling process, of which this book was just another step.

In his 2009 book Fotografie und Geschichte (Photography and History) German art historian Jens Jäger gave special importance to Geary's and British historian Elizabeth Edwards' publications in the late 1980s and early 1990s: In their contributions to the methodological and theoretical approaches to historical photographs, the work of Geary and Edwards discussed the complex theoretical, technical and cultural questions, the selection of motifs, the staging and contextualisation of the photographs and the roles of the people pictured.

Writer and filmmaker John Melville Bishop reviewed Geary's 2018 illustrated book Postcards from Africa: Photographers of the Colonial Era for the academic journal Visual Anthropology. After noting that the book includes 90 photographs and captions, reproduced in their original color tones, he wrote that Geary's commentary places seemingly random images in a context that shows how the postcards and the stories behind them are connected as a unified motif. Bishop placed special emphasis on how Geary presents the colonial context and how picture postcards supported the imperial enterprise. Further, he wrote that the book "invites the reader to consider the postcard as a form; a phenomenon in its own right, not only a reflection of a reality, but also an object embedding social and commercial values." Paraphrasing Geary's words about the sitter's agency and subjectivities, Bishop wrote: "In a profound way, the subjects are the co-authors of the pictures."

In her scholarly review about the same book, Aimée Bessire from the Art & Visual Culture department at Bates College called it "an excellent overview and in-depth analysis of pictorial postcards of Africa" and commented: "Geary considers the possible relationships between photographer and those photographed and provides examples demonstrating the agency and self-awareness of Africans in fashioning themselves in images."

Another review about the same book in the British magazine The Critic was largely dismissive of Geary's criticism of colonial photography. In particular, the reviewer declined to share Geary's value judgments, insisting on the readers' choice to judge "what they consider acceptable and unacceptable, fair and unfair stereotypes and the value of colonisation."

Writing for the New York Times about the exhibition Art in Cameroon: Sculptural Dialogues at the Neuberger Museum in 2011, art critic Holland Cotter remarked about Geary's exhibition catalog: "In just a few dense pages Ms. Geary subtly rethinks and reshapes the old one-tribe-one-style concept. Yes, she suggests, certain basic art forms were historically found all across the Grassfields of Cameroon, the stretch of mountains and savannahs that make up much of the country. Considered to embody political, social and spiritual power in a land peppered with kingdoms large and small, these forms had fixed use-value."

In 2022, the Museum Rietberg in Zurich, Switzerland, presented an exhibition of 100 historical images by African photographers, mainly selected from the museum's Christraud M. Geary Collection, titled "The Future is blinking. Early Studio Photography from West and Central Africa."

== See also ==
- Visual anthropology
- African Photography Encounters
- Lagos Photo
- Photography in Nigeria
- Photography in South Africa
- Photography in Sudan
