= Africa's Out! =

Africa's Out! is a charitable organization located in Brooklyn, New York, United States, founded by artist and activist Wangechi Mutu in 2014. Africa's Out! uses artists and the community from within Africa and its diaspora, to highlight social and political issues through creative platforms.

Africa's Out!’s artist residency program supports emerging and mid-career artists from the African diaspora whose work speaks to a social and political engagement with Africa. The selected artists benefit from the space to create and the exposure to the contemporary art conversations and relationships that Africa's Out! offers. This brings the artist in residence's perspective into conversation with more established artists, curators, and collectors in the New York City art community. In partnership with Denniston Hill, an artist residency in upstate New York, founded by artists including Julie Mehretu, Paul Pfeiffer, and Lawrence Chua, Africa's Out! has awarded Michael Soi (2016) and Lerato Shadi (2017) residency grants.

Africa's Out! has funded programming at the Brooklyn Museum, Afropunk Festival, Studio Museum in Harlem and NeueHouse.
