= Zanele Muholi =

South African artist and visual activist (born 1972)

Zanele Muholi FRPS
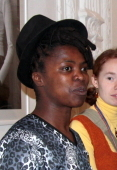
- Muholi at the 2011 International Gay and Lesbian Film Festival
- Born: 1972 (age 53–54); Umlazi, Durban, South Africa
- Education: Market Photo Workshop, MFA in Toronto Metropolitan University
- Known for: Photography
- Awards: Mbokodo Award (Visual Art) for South African Women in the Arts

Zanele Muholi (born 1972) is a South African artist and visual activist working in photography, video, and installation. Muholi's work focuses on race, gender and sexuality with a body of work that dates back to the early 2000s, documenting and celebrating the lives of South Africa's Black lesbian, gay, transgender, and intersex communities. Muholi is non-binary and uses they/them pronouns, explaining that "I'm just human".

Muholi has described themselves as a visual activist as opposed to an artist. They are dedicated to increasing the visibility of black lesbian, gay, transgender, and intersex people. They researched and documented the stories of hate crimes against the LGBTQI community in order to bring forth the realities of "corrective rape," assault, and HIV/AIDS, to public attention.

Muholi was shortlisted for the Deutsche Börse Photography Prize in 2015. They received an Infinity Award from the International Center of Photography in 2016, a Chevalier de Ordre des Arts et des Lettres in 2016, an Honorary Fellowship of the Royal Photographic Society in 2018 and the 46th Hasselblad Award in 2026.

Muholi had a retrospective exhibition on at Maison européenne de la photographie in Paris from 1 February to 25 May 2023. Their work was also shown that year at Mudec-Museo delle Culture in Milan, from 31 March through 30 July 2023, showcasing 60 self-portraits in black and white chosen especially for Mudec.

== Early life and education ==
Zanele Muholi was born and raised in Umlazi, Durban, KwaZulu-Natal. Their father was Ashwell Tanji Banda Muholi and their mother was Bester Muholi. They are the youngest of eight children. Muholi's father died shortly after their birth, and their mother was a domestic worker who had to leave her children to work for a white family during apartheid in South Africa. Muholi was raised by an extended family.

Muholi completed an Advanced Photography course at the Market Photo Workshop in Newtown, Johannesburg in 2003, and held their first solo exhibition at the Johannesburg Art Gallery in 2004. In 2009, they were awarded their Master of Fine Arts degree in Documentary Media from Toronto Metropolitan University, formerly known as Ryerson University, in Toronto, Canada. Their thesis mapped the visual history of black lesbian identity and politics in post-Apartheid South Africa.

On 28 October 2013, they were appointed Honorary Professor – video and photography at the University of the Arts Bremen in Germany.

== Photography ==
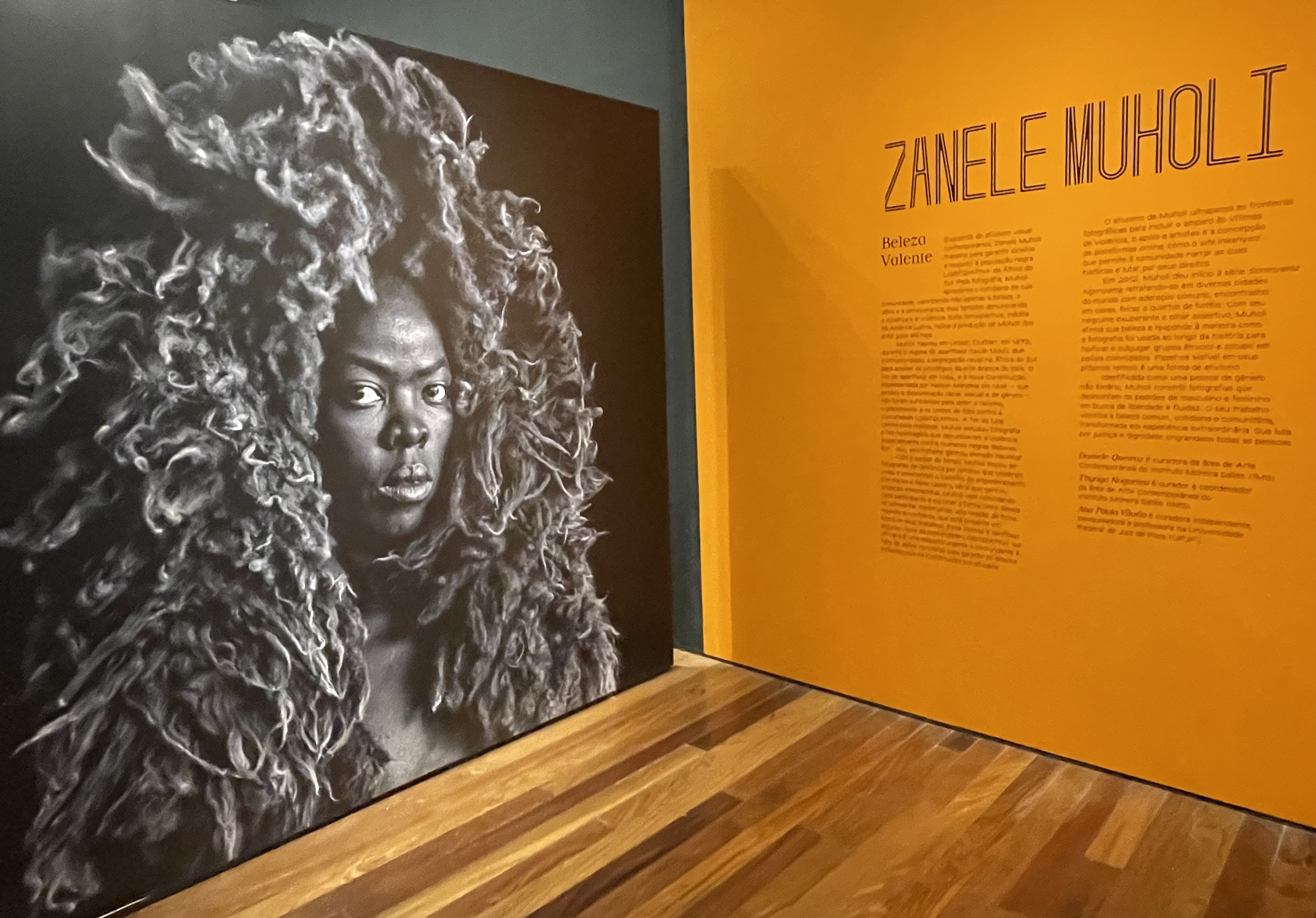
Brave Beauties at the Museu de Arte do Rio

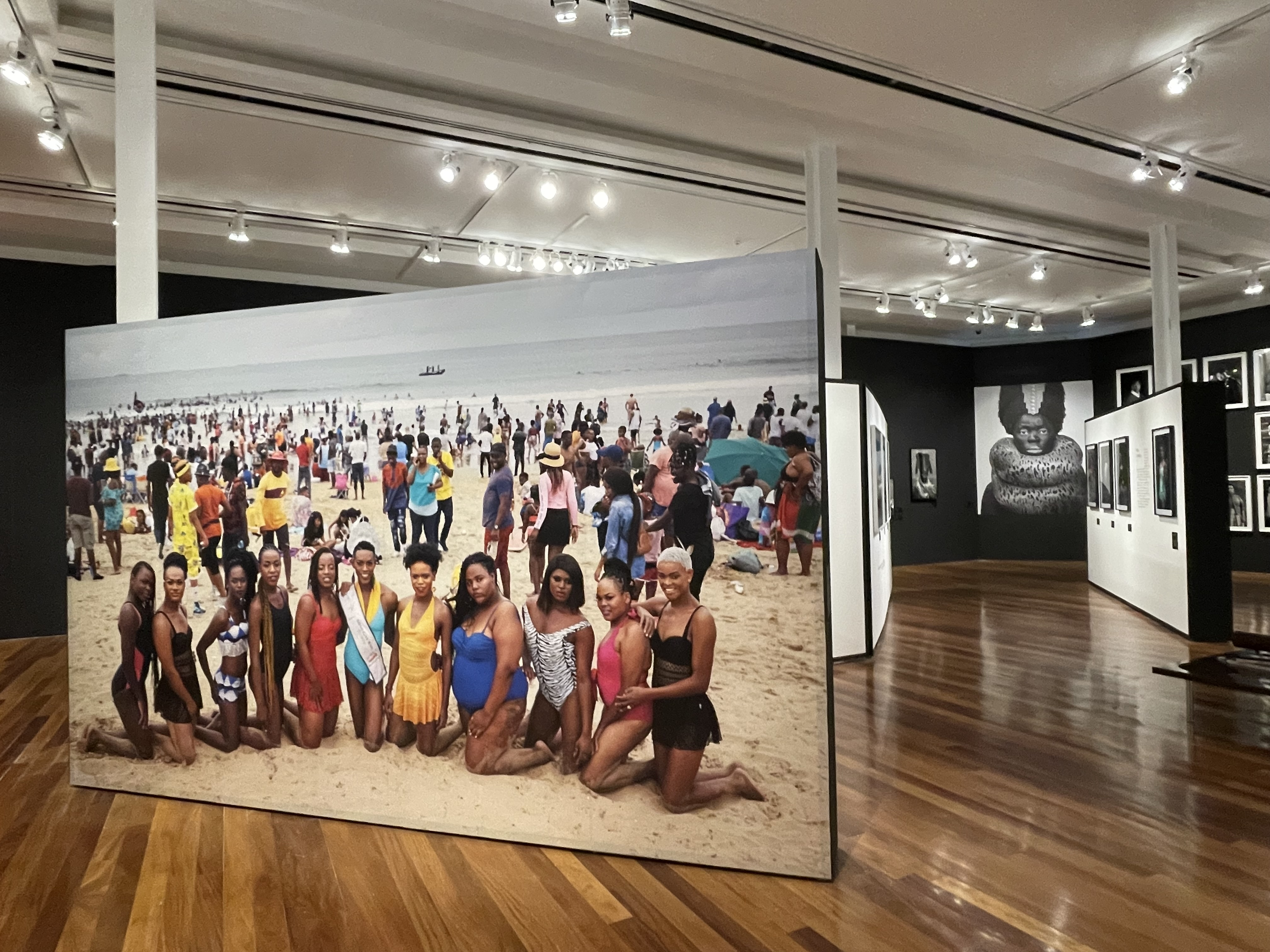
Muholi solo exhibition

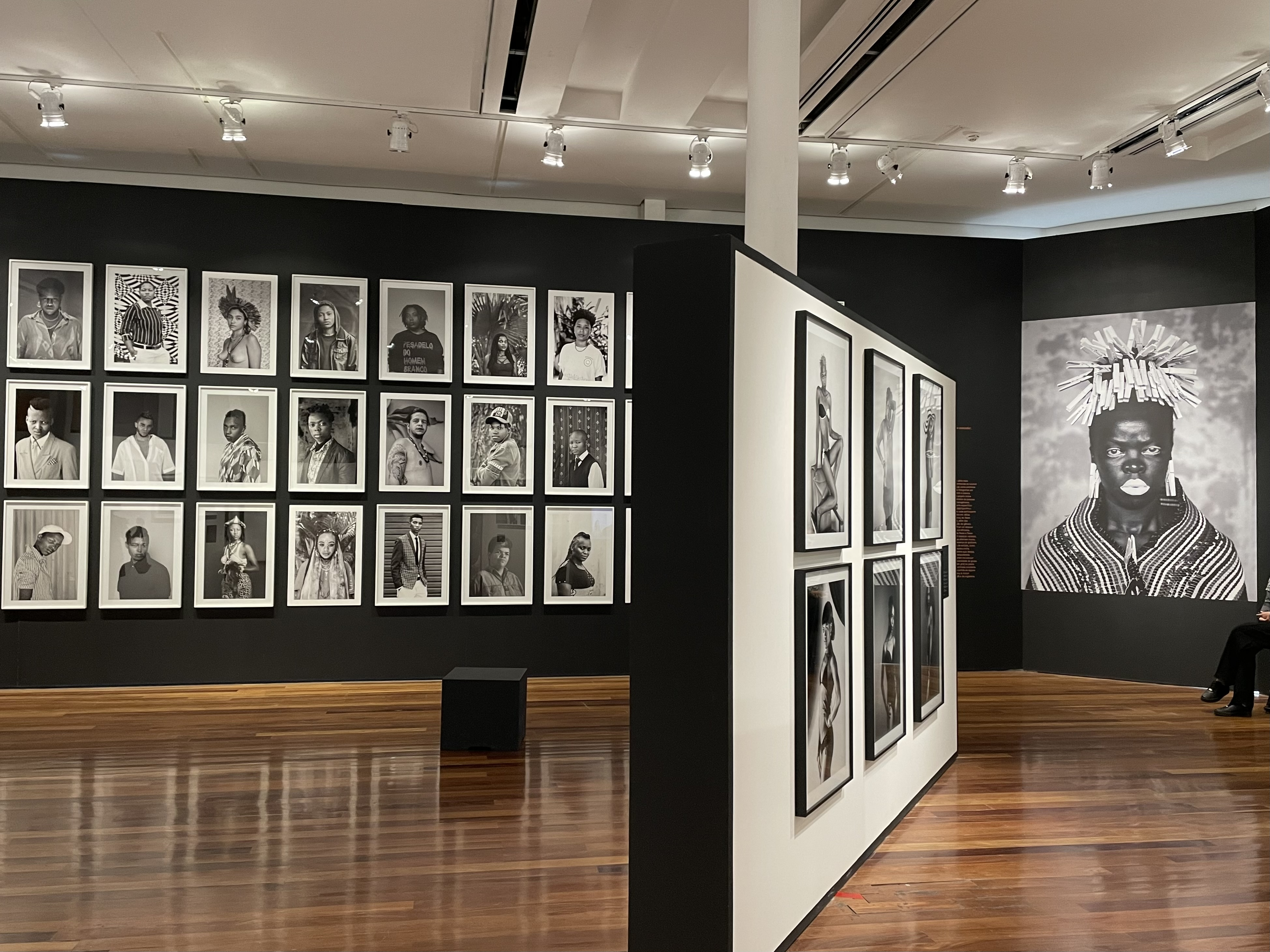
Muholi photographic portraits

Muholi's photography has been compared to the way W.E.B. DuBois subverted the typical representations of African Americans. Both Muholi and Du Bois have created an archive of photos, working to dismantle dominant, pre-existing perceptions of the subjects they chose to photograph. Muholi views their work as collaborative, referring to the individuals they photograph as "participants" rather than as subjects. With the term "participants" Muholi allows their participants to collaborate on poses instead of Muholi placing them in positions. Seeking to empower their subjects, Muholi often invites participants to speak at events and exhibitions, adding the participant's voice to the conversation. Through their artistic approach they hope to document the journey of the African queer community as a record for future generations. They try to capture the moment without negativity or focusing on the prevalent violence, portraying the LGBTQI community as individuals and as a whole to encourage unity. Thus, their work can be considered documentative, recording the overall community LGBTI of South Africa and their challenges, and at times, more specifically the struggle of black lesbians. Before 1994, black lesbian voices were largely excluded from the making of a formal queer movement. Muholi's efforts of creating a more positive visualization of LGBTI Africans combats the homophobic-motivated violence that is prevalent in South Africa today, especially in the case of black lesbians. While black women's bodies appear frequently throughout sexualized pop-culture, black lesbians are viewed (through the lens of the patriarchy and heteronormativity) as undesirable. This negative view of homosexuals in Africa lead to violence, such as murder and rape, and rejection from their families. Muholi's Zukiswa (2010), shows an African lesbian woman making eye contact with the viewer, displaying an unwavering gaze of confidence, self-awareness, and determination. This example encourages awareness, acceptance, and positivity with the queer community as well as South Africa.

Although Muholi became known as a photographer who engaged with the then-invisible lives of black lesbians in South Africa, they began to recognize this idea of "gender within gender." In 2003, and their sense of community definitively began to include trans people. Muholi was employed as a photographer and reporter for Behind the Mask, an online magazine on LGBTI issues in Africa.

Muholi first received global attention from the art world in 2012 at Documenta, a world-famous exhibition of modern and contemporary art in (Germany), for a series of portraits of lesbians and transgender participants titled: Faces and Phases. The photos were also exhibited at Stedelijk Museum Amsterdam.

=== Visual Sexuality: Only Half the Picture (2004) ===
Muholi launched their first solo exhibition, entitled Visual Sexuality: Only Half the Picture, at the Johannesburg Art Gallery in 2004. This exhibition featured photographs of survivors of rape and hate crimes as well as an image of a rape and an assault case number. The artist explicitly captured the images as to not reveal the person's gender, and the people in the images remain anonymous. Their work is mostly about bringing visibility to queer people in the black community.

=== Faces and Phases (2006–ongoing) ===
In 2006, Muholi began their Faces and Phases project, a series of around three hundred portraits of lesbians, shot in front of plain or patterned backgrounds. The project began in 2006 when Muholi photographed activist and friend Busi Sigasa. Sigasa is a survivor of corrective rape and contracted HIV from the attack. Muholi's concern for their participant's safety dictated that all pictured individuals be of age and fully out. Faces and Phases mocks the "art-in-service-to-science" narrative engrained in colonial images. 18th century botany imagery shows various plants plucked from their natural environment therefore erasing any social or cultural context. This practice emphasizes Western discovery of an object without acknowledging its longstanding existence. According to Susan Kart at Grove Art Online, this project "documents victims of sexual assault and hate crimes, the wedding images share moments of victory, acceptance, and joy for LGBTI families." In Faces and Phases, Muholi utilizes this history and compares it to the representation of LGBTI in South Africa. Black queer individuals have increased dramatically in national representation but this is still an erasure of important context. These individuals are represented in the same way as the botanical prints. There is increased visibility for Western consumption but no attention is paid to the suffering and systematic oppression these individuals face in post-apartheid South Africa. Muholi challenges this in their series by providing names, dates, locations, and representing the participants within a public sphere.

In June 2014, Muholi was back at their alma mater, showing Faces and Phases at the Ryerson Image Centre as part of WorldPride. In the same month they showed at the Singapore International Arts Festival's O.P.E.N. where they also spoke on legacies of violence.

=== Innovative Women (2009) ===
In 2009, the Innovative Women exhibition was shown in South Africa in the cities of Durban and Cape Town. It was curated by painter Bongi Bhengu and features their work as well as 9 other artists including Muholi and photographer Nandipha Mntambo. In August 2009, the Minister of Arts and Culture Lulu Xingwana walked out of the exhibition due to Muholi's photography, calling it immoral, offensive and going against nation-building. In their response Muholi said "It's paralysing. I expected people to think before they act, and to ask questions. I wanted to create dialogue."

=== Transfigures (2010–2011) ===
Their Transfigures project (2010–2011) embraces lesbian and trans life. The portraits are taken in urban and rural settings in South Africa and internationally. Muholi’s artworks express a sense of intimacy that also gives a sense of the tragedies that can occur to the photo subjects. Muholi’s works document queer individuals as they exist in Africa and the different forms they take throughout their lives, particularly lesbian and transgender individuals.

=== Of Love & Loss (2014) ===
Muholi's 2014 exhibition, Of Love & Loss, focused on the violence and hate crimes experienced by members of the LGBTQIA communities in South Africa. Juxtaposing images of weddings and funerals, the show included photographs, video works and installation elements. An element of autobiography featured images of Muholi and their partner. This exhibition furthermore exemplifies why Muholi calls themself a visual activist rather than an artist and it shows their battle scars. They bring these harsh issues into light with such powerful contrast, as a way to show resistance. Muholi calls this as just one of their many responsibilities, and these harsh and cruel realities cannot be ignored.

=== Brave Beauties (2014-present) ===
A series focusing on capturing the portraits of trans women, Brave Beauties was shot outside the studio and on location throughout South Africa. This "mobile studio" was a further expression of Muholi's celebration of LGBTQIA visibility as equal citizens of their country, an embrace of artistic freedom and a gesture of rejecting the limitations that studios can present. While on show at the Stevenson Gallery in Cape Town, an "activist wall" encouraged the participants to write directly on the gallery walls about their experiences, stories and vision. A gesture of destabilization, the activist wall was another expression of Muholi's desire to empower the participants in their work.

In 2026, Muholi presented 100+ photographic portraits in a solo exhibition titled Beleza Valente [Brave Beauties] at the Museu de Arte do Rio. The exhibition represents two decades of Muholi's work celebrating Black LGBTQIAPN+ visibility, resilience, and self-representation.

=== Isibonelo/Evidence (2015) ===
In 2015, Muholi presented 87 works in their solo Isibonelo/Evidence at the Brooklyn Museum. The meaning of the show's title, in which "Isibonelo" roughly translates from Zulu to "evidence," referred to its contents, which were split into three main sections separated on three walls. The first featured a decade-long chronology of hate crimes in South Africa, and faced the second, which was covered in handwritten messages from members of the LGBTQIA communities. The third and final wall consisted of portraits, including one of Muholi themself.

=== Somnyama Ngonyama ("Hail the Dark Lioness") (2012–present) ===
In 2014 Muholi began working on 365 self portraits for the series Somnyama Ngonyama. The portraits are alter egos, often with a Zulu name.That Muholi turned the camera towards themselves in this series is a departure from their previous work. Muholi explains, “I needed it to be my own portraiture. I didn't want to expose another person to this pain. I was also thinking about how acts of violence are intimately connected to our faces. Remember that when a person is violated, it frequently starts with the face: it’s the face that disturbs the perpetrator, which then leads to something else. Hence the face is the focal point in the series: facing myself and facing the viewer, the camera, directly.”

For most of the pieces in the collection Muholi exaggerated the darkness of their skin tone to reclaim their blackness from its performance by "privileged others." This, academic and critic Nomusa Makhubu explains, is in reference to the appropriation of blackness in minstrel performance. Of this series, the writer and cultural historian Maurice Berger has this to say: "The self-portraits function on various levels and pay homage to the history of black women in Africa and beyond, the dark lionesses of the book’s title. They reimagine black identity in ways that are largely personal but inevitably political. And they challenge the stereotypes and oppressive standards of beauty that often ignore people of color."

This series had a debut exhibition at Yancey Richardson Gallery in New York in 2015. It was shown in London in 2017 and in Times Square in New York City as digital billboards during the city's autumn 2017 Performa Biennial festival. Previews in Muholi's New York gallery were sold out. The photos were published in a 2018 book published by Aperture. In 2019 Muholi won the Photography Book award from the Kraszna-Krausz Foundation for Somnyama Ngonyama. Hail, the Dark Lioness.

== Activism ==
In 2002, Muholi co-founded the Forum for the Empowerment of Women (FEW), a black lesbian organization dedicated to providing a safe space for women to meet and organize.

=== Inkanyiso (2009) ===
In 2006 Zanele Muholi conceptualized a platform that promoted Queer Activism = Queer media. With the intention of a flexible and unique source of information for art advocacy. In 2009, Muholi founded Inkanyiso ("illuminate" in Zulu), a non-profit organisation concerned with queer visual activism. In 2009, Muholi registered the non-profit organization with Department of Social Services (NPO 073–402). It is involved with visual arts and media advocacy for and on behalf of the LGBTI community. The organization's vision statement is "Produce. Educate. Disseminate."

=== Women's Mobile Museum (2018) ===
In 2018, Muholi collaborated with photographer Lindeka Qampi and the Philadelphia Photo Arts Center (PPAC), to mentor a cohort of women artists in Philadelphia. Called the Women's Mobile Museum, the collaborative project culminated in a special exhibition at the PPAC featuring works by the participating artists. According to art critic Megan Voeller: "For nearly nine months, they underwent a professional boot camp at PPAC, starting with technical workshops in digital camerawork, lighting and Photoshop and progressing to assembling and promoting an exhibition."

=== Somnyama Ngonyama (2021) ===
In 2021, Muholi produced a colouring book of their exhibition Somnyama Ngonyama to engage South-African children who are categorised as youth until the age of 35, as a result of the apartheid. Workshops teaching photography and painting were organised in parallel to provide the opportunity of an art education to underprivileged regions. The matter is of personal concern to the artist as someone who grew up under similar circumstances faced with conditions that they are still trying to 'break through' today. 'My activism now focuses on education and building arts infrastructure in places that are rural or still considered peripheral,' Muholi tells Ocula Magazine.

== Documentaries ==
In 2010, Muholi co-directed their documentary Difficult Love, which was commissioned by SABC. Difficult Love provides a look into Muholi's life and the lives, loves and struggles of other black lesbians in South Africa. In the documentary Muholi presents the stories and people that inspired them to create their images. It has shown in South Africa, USA, Spain, Sweden, UK, Amsterdam, Paris (Festival Cinefable) and Italy. In 2013, Muholi co-directed a documentary called We Live in Fear, released by Human Rights Watch.

== Attacks and robberies ==
On 20 April 2012, Muholi's flat in Vredehoek was robbed, with over twenty primary and back-up external hard drives containing five years' worth of photos and video being stolen with their laptop. Photos contained therein include records of the funerals of Black South African lesbians murdered in hate crimes. Nothing else was stolen, raising suspicions that Muholi's recordings of Black lesbian life was targeted. Muholi was overseas at the time of the robbery. This effectively erased the previous five years of Muholi's work. A few weeks later they said, "I'm still traumatized by the burglary" and, "It's hard to fall asleep in this place, which is now a crime scene, as I dealt with many crime scenes before."

In July 2017, a collaborator of Muholi's, Sibahle Nkumbi, was pushed down a staircase in Amsterdam by their Airbnb host while visiting the Netherlands to cover the opening of Muholi's exhibition at the Stedelijk Museum. Nkumbi was hospitalised, sustaining a concussion and substantial bruising. Video footage of the confrontation subsequently went viral, and the host was charged with attempted manslaughter.

== Publication ==
- Zanele Muholi: Only Half The Picture. Cape Town: Michael Stevenson, 2006. ISBN 0-620361468.
- Faces and Phases. Munich; Berlin; London; New York: Prestel, 2010. ISBN 978-3-7913-4495-9.
- Zanele Muholi. African Women Photographers #1. Granada, Spain: Casa África/La Fábrica, 2011. ISBN 978-8-4150-3466-7.
- Faces + Phases 2006–14. Göttingen, Germany: Steidl, 2014. ISBN 978-3-86930-807-4.
- Somnyama Ngonyama, Hail the Dark Lioness. Renée Mussai (author), Zanele Muholi (photographer), et al., New York: Aperture, 2018, ISBN 978-1597114240.

== Exhibitions ==
=== Solo exhibitions ===
- 2004: Visual Sexuality, as part of Urban Life (Market Photo Workshop exhibition), Johannesburg Art Gallery, Johannesburg, South Africa.
- 2006: Vienna Kunsthalle project space, Vienna: Slide Show
- 2014: Faces and Phases, Massimadi Festival, Montreal, Canada
- 2015: Zanele Muholi: Vukani/Rise, Open Eye Gallery, Liverpool, England
- 2015: Somnyama Ngonyama, Yancey Richardson, New York, NY, USA
- 2017: Zanele Muholi, Stedelijk, Amsterdam
- 2017: Zanele Muholi: Somnyama Ngonyama, Hail the Dark Lioness, Autograph ABP, London
- 2017: Zanele Muholi Homecoming: Durban Art Gallery, Durban, South Africa
- 2018: Zanele Muholi: Somnyama Ngonyama, Hail the Dark Lioness Spelman College Museum of Art, Atlanta, GA, USA
- 2018: Somnyama Ngonyama, Hail the Dark Lioness, Fotografiska Stockholm, Sweden
- 2019: Zanele Muholi: Somnyama Ngonyama, Hail the Dark Lioness Colby College Museum of Art, Maine, USA
- 2019: Somnyama Ngonyama, Hail the Dark Lioness, Seattle Art Museum, WA, USA
- 2020/21: Zanele Muholi, Tate Modern, London (delayed opening) – their biggest solo exhibition to date
- 2022: Being Muholi: Portraits as Resistance, Isabella Stewart Gardner Museum, Boston, MA
- 2022: Zanele Muholi, National Gallery of Iceland, Reykjavik, Iceland
- 2023: Maison européenne de la photographie, Paris
- 2023: Muholi: A Visual Activist, Museo delle culture (Milano), Milan, Italy
- 2023: Zanele Muholi, Kunstmuseum Luzern, Luzern, Switzerland
- 2024: Zanele Muholi: Eye Me, San Francisco Museum of Modern Art, San Francisco, CA
- 2024: Zanele Muholi, Tate Modern, London
- 2026: Zanele Muholi: Beleza Valente, Museu de Arte do Rio, Rio de Janeiro, Brazil

=== Group exhibitions ===
- 2011: Figures & Fictions: Contemporary South African Photography, Victoria and Albert Museum, London, England
- 2016: Systematically Personae at the FotoFocus Biennal, National Underground Railroad Freedom Center, Cincinnati, OH, USA
- 2017: Art/Afrique, Louis Vuitton Foundation, Paris, France
- 2018: Half the Picture: A Feminist Look at the Collection, Brooklyn Museum, New York, NY, USA
- 2018: Legacy of the Cool: A Tribute to Barkley L. Hendricks, MassArt Art Museum (MAAM), Boston, MA, USA
- 2019: Yithi Laba. A group exhibition by Lindeka Qampi, Neo Ntsoma, Zanele Muholi, Ruth Seopedi Motau and Berni Searle at Market Photo Workshop, Johannesburg, South Africa
- 2019: 58th Venice Biennale curated by Ralph Rugoff
- 2020: Radical Revisionists: Contemporary African Artists Confronting Past and Present, Moody Center for the Arts, Houston, TX, USA
- 2020: Through an African Lens: Sub-Saharan Photography from the Museum's Collection, The Museum of Fine Arts, Houston, Houston, TX, USA
- 2020: Crossing Views, Fondation Louis Vuitton, Paris, France
- 2020: African Cosmologies: Fotofest Biennial 2020, Houston, Texas, USA
- 2020: Sydney Biennale 2020, Sydney Australia
- 2021: Afro-Atlantic Histories, The Museum of Fine Arts, Houston, TX, USA
- 2021: Interior Infinite, The Polygon Gallery, Vancouver, Canada
- 2021: THIS IS NOT AFRICA – UNLEARN WHAT YOU HAVE LEARNED, ARoS Aarhus Kunstmuseum, Denmark; Red Clay, Ghana
- 2022: Afro-Atlantic Histories, LACMA, Los Angeles, California, USA
- 2022: Afro-Atlantic Histories, National Gallery of Art, Washington D.C., USA
- 2022: Fire Figure Fantasy: Selections from ICA Miami’s Collection, ICA Miami, Miami, FL, USA
- 2022: A Gateway to Possible Worlds, Centre Pompidou-Metz, Metz, France
- 2022: The Work of Love, the Queer of Labor, Pratt Manhattan Gallery, New York, NY, USA
- 2022: Facing Claude Cahun & Marcel Moore Peel Art Gallery Museum and Archives, Brampton, ON, Canada
- 2023: Facing Claude Cahun & Marcel Moore Peel Art Gallery Museum and Archives, Brampton, ON, Canada
- 2023: Black Venus, Fotografiska New York, NY
- 2023: Museu de l’art Prohibit, Barcelona, Spain
- 2023: La Cinquième Saison (The Fifth Season), Jardin des Tuileries, Paris, France
- 2023: Love & Anarchy, Nasher Museum of Art at Duke University, Durham, NC
- 2023: Imagining Black Diasporas: 21st Century Art and Poetics, LACMA, Los Angeles, CA
- 2023: Africa Fashion, Brooklyn Museum, New York, USA
- 2023: Black Venus: Reclaiming Black Women in Visual Culture, Somerset House, London, UK
- 2023: Youth vs. Crisis: A Generation in Search of a Future, Kunsthalle Bremen, Bremen, Germany
- 2023: A Gateway to Possible Worlds, Centre Pompidou-Metz, Metz, France
- 2023: Coyote Park: I Love You Like Mirrors Do, Leslie-Lohman Museum of Art, New York, NY
- 2023: Trace – Formations of Likeness: Photography and Video from The Walther Collection, Haus der Kunst, Munich, Germany
- 2023: Lente Africana; fotografia subsahariana de la colleción del Museum of Fine Arts, Houston, TX, USA
- 2023: Museo de Arte Miguel Urrutia, Bogotá, Colombia
- 2023: Nudes – Art from the Tate, LWL Museum for Art and Culture, Münster, Germany
- 2023: Photography Real and Imagined, National Gallery of Victoria, Melbourne, Australia
- 2023: Afro-Atlantic Histories, Dallas Museum of Art, Dallas, TX, USA
- 2023: This is Me, This is You. The Eva Felten Photography Collection, Museum Brandhorst, Munich, Germany
- 2023: Dawn of Humanity: Art in Periods of Upheaval, Kunstmuseum Bonn, Bonn, Germany
- 2023: Corps à corps: Histoire(s) de la photographie, Centre Pompidou, Paris, France
- 2023: Veneradas y Temidas: El poder femenino en el arte y las creencias, CaixaForum Madrid, Madrid, Spain
- 2024: Photography Real and Imagined, National Gallery of Victoria, Melbourne, Australia Afro-Atlantic Histories, Dallas Museum of Art, Dallas, TX, USA
- 2024: Dawn of Humanity: Art in Periods of Upheaval, Kunstmuseum Bonn, Bonn, Germany Corps à corps: Histoire(s) de la photographie, Centre Pompidou, Paris, France
- 2024: This is Me, This is You. The Eva Felten Photography Collection, Museum Brandhorst, Munich, Germany
- 2024: Turning the Page, Pier 24 Photography, San Francisco, CA
- 2024: Veneradas y Temidas: El poder femenino en el arte y las creencias, CaixaForum Madrid, Madrid, Spain; CaixaForum Barcelona, Barcelona, Spain; CaixaForum Sevilla, Sevilla, Spain; CaixaForum Zaragoza, Zaragoza, Spain

=== Curated exhibitions ===
- 2016: Co-curated a show at Rencontres d'Arles photography festival, Arles, France

== Awards ==
- 2005: Tollman Award for the Visual Arts
- 2006: BHP Billiton/Wits University Visual Arts Fellowship
- 2009: Thami Mnyele Residency in Amsterdam
- 2009: Ida Ely Rubin Artist-in-Residence at the Massachusetts Institute of Technology, USA
- 2009: Fondation Blachère award at African Photography Encounters (Rencontres Africaines de la Photographie, Biennale Africaine de la photographie) in Bamako, Mali
- 2009: Fanny Ann Eddy accolade from IRN-Africa for their outstanding contributions to the study of sexuality in Africa
- 2012: Civitella Ranieri Fellowship by the Civitella Ranieri Foundation, Italy
- 2013: Freedom of Expression award by Index on Censorship
- 2013: Glamour Magazine named them Campaigner of the Year
- 2013: Winner of the Fine Prize for the 2013 Carnegie International
- 2013: Prince Claus Award
- 2013: Feather Award (South Africa's LGBTI Awards)
- 2015: Shortlisted for the Deutsche Börse Photography Prize for Faces and Phases 2006–2014
- 2015: Light Work Artist-in-Residence Program, Syracuse, NY, USA
- 2016: Infinity Award for Documentary and Photojournalism from the International Center of Photography, New York, NY, USA
- 2016: Africa's Out! Courage + Creativity Award
- 2016: Outstanding International Alumni Award from Ryerson University
- 2017: Mbokodo Award (Visual Art) for South African Women in the Arts
- 2017: Chevalier de Ordre des Arts et des Lettres (Knighthood of the Order Arts and Letters)
- 2018: Honorary Fellowship of the Royal Photographic Society, Bath, England
- 2019: Rees Visionary Award, Amref Health Africa, New York, USA
- 2019: Lucie Humanitarian Award
- 2019 Kraszna-Krausz Foundation Best Photography Book Award
- 2026 Hasselblad Award

== Collections ==
Muholi's work is held in the following public collections:

- Art Institute of Chicago, Chicago, IL (7 prints)
- Solomon R. Guggenheim Museum, New York (3 prints as of October 2018)
- Museum of Modern Art, New York (6 prints as of March 2019)
- Williams College Museum of Art, Williamstown, MA (1 featured print as of March 2019)
- North Carolina Museum of Art, Raleigh, NC
- Nasher Museum of Art, Durham, NC (2 prints as of March 2019)
- Cincinnati Art Museum, Cincinnati, OH
- Tate Modern, London (15 pieces)
- Minneapolis Institute of Art, Minneapolis, MN (3 prints as of August 2020)
- National Museum of Women in the Arts
