= John Fleetwood (curator) =

South African art curator

- Born: 1970 (age 55–56); South Africa
- Occupation: Director of Photo:
- Known for: Transition (Social Landscape Project)

John Fleetwood (born 1970) is a South African photography curator, educator who was from 2002 to 2015 director of Market Photo Workshop (part of Market Theatre Foundation, Johannesburg) and has since 2016 been director of Photo: in Johannesburg.

== Early life and education ==
Fleetwood was born in Randfontein, Gauteng Province. He studied Political Studies at the University of Johannesburg (1989–1993) and photography at the Vaal University of Technology (1993–1995). He participated in several research courses at the Visual Studies Department at the Centre of Humanities Research, University of Western Cape, South Africa (2014–2016). Fleetwood is fluent in Afrikaans and English.

== Career ==
In his work as director of photography institutions, as well as curator, Fleetwood is promoting and mentoring young and upcoming South African photographers. Founded by David Goldblatt in 1989, Market Photo Workshop has become one of the most significant non-formal art education institutions in southern Africa, where photography and critical visual thinking are approached as artistic practices for social change. Fleetwood has facilitated, organised and supported a range of different photography education interventions, activities and organisations in South Africa and internationally. In January 2016, Fleetwood started Photo: a platform that develops, curates and commissions photography projects, mainly working with emerging photographers from the African continent. He is a convener for the Centres of Learning for Photography in Africa, a network of independent training initiatives on the continent to develop and exchange photography learning.

== Curated exhibitions ==
- Transition (Social Landscape Project). Exhibited at the Bus Factory, Johannesburg Nov 2012 & Rencontres d’Arles, France Jul 2013
- A Return to Elsewhere, Brighton Photo Biennale, 2014, UK and Johannesburg Photo
- Against Time, The Tierney Fellowship, 10th Edition of the Bamako Encounters, African Photography, Biennale, Mali, 2015
- Wide Angle Multi-platform project (2015) that through a forum, discussion groups, an exhibition and an e-book
- Of traps and tropes, Kerkennah01, Kerkennah Islands, off the coast of Sfax, Tunisia, 2018.
- Five Photographers. A tribute to David Goldblatt: An exhibition of Alexia Webster, Jabulani Dhlamini, Mauro Vombe and Pierre Crocquet. Co-curated with David Goldblatt. First exhibited at the Gerard Sekoto Gallery, Alliance Française in Johannesburg (May 2018), at the Centro Cultural Franco-Moçambicano in Mozambique (Feb 2019), Café What?, Maseru, Lesotho (May 2019), National Arts Festival, Makhanda (Jun 2019), Durban Art Gallery, South Africa (Aug 2019) and part of the 12th edition of the African Photography Encounters, Bamako, Mali (Nov 2019).

== Award nominator ==
- Joop Swart Masterclass, World Press Awards, 2009–2020.
- Prix Pictet, 2016–2020.
- FOAM Paul Huf Award, 2016- 2020.
- The Gabriele Basilico International Prize of Architecture and Landscape Photography, Milan, Italy, 2015

== Other activities ==
- Guest editor for Aperture Edition 227 Platform Africa in 2017.
- Jury member for the Contemporary African Photography Prize, 2014–2020
