= Sabelo Mlangeni =

South African photographer (born 1980)

- Born: February 22, 1980 (age 45); Driefontein, Mpumalanga, South Africa
- Education: Market Photo Workshop
- Known for: Black and White Photography

Sabelo Mlangeni is a South African photographer living and working in Johannesburg, South Africa. His photography is focused on depictions of communities. Mlangeni's work is held in the collections of Tate, the Art Institute of Chicago, the San Francisco Museum of Modern Art, and the Walther Collection. Mlangeni speaks multiple languages including; IsiZulu, Igbo, Dagbanli, Nguni and English.

== Early life and education ==
No Nepa evening with Nonso, Thom, Mike, Daniel and Ruby, 2019

Sabelo Mlangeni was born in 1980 in Driefontein, a village near Wakkerstroom in Mpumalanga, South Africa. Mlangeni's career began with his education in photography through the Market Photo Workshop beginning in 2001 and graduating in 2004. Mlangeni is part of the Zionist church.

== Life and work ==
Mlangeni's photography is focused on depictions of communities, almost all of his work is done in black and white. He often spends extended time with his subjects in order to portray them more authentically. Mlangeni often portrays Black gay men in South Africa in private and public personas, his shows Country Girls (2009) and Royal House of Allure (2019) are examples that were exhibited in La Biennale Di Venezia 2024, Nucleo Contemporaneo. Though Mlangeni produced many works in Johannesburg, South Africa, he has worked globally. He has created works and had exhibitions in many countries including the United States of America, the Netherlands, and other African countries including Mali and Nigeria.

== Residencies ==
Sabelo Mlangeni has participated in two known residency programs:

- 2017 Walther Collection, Neu-Ulm, Germany
- 2018 A4 Arts Foundation, Cape Town, South Africa

== Collections ==
Mlangeni's work is or has been held in the following public and institutional collections:

- Tate, London
- San Francisco Museum of Modern Art, San Francisco, USA
- Johannesburg Art Gallery, Johannesburg, South Africa
- Walther Collection, Neu-Ulm, Germany
- Art Institute of Chicago, Chicago, USA
- Kadist, Paris

== Publications ==
There are two known book publications from Sabelo Mlangeni:

- Sabelo Mlangeni: Umlindelo wamaKholwa. Johannesburg: Wits Art Museum, 2018. ISBN 978-0-620-79786-3.
- Sabelo Mlangeni - Isivumelwano. African Photobook of the Year award 2024. Fw:Books
