= Denniston Hill =

American artists residency

Denniston Hill is an artist residency and production company situated in Catskills Mountains in New York State with an agricultural bent that hosts creatives from all around the world.

== Location ==
Denniston Hill is located on approximately 220 forested acres on a former dairy farm. It has a central house with 6 bedrooms.

== History ==
The residency was founded in 2004 by artists Julie Mehretu and Paul Pfeiffer, and architect Lawrence Chua.

Mehretu first visited the property in 2001 when she was invited by Chua to rent a room. In 2007, Mehretu and Pfeiffer bought 10 central acres containing a main house and pond.

While Denniston Hill started as an artists residency, it eventually evolved into a production company which helped artists create collaborative works.

== 2026 Venice Biennale ==
Denniston Hill was one of six schools and artists collectives invited to take part in the 2026 Venice Biennale, which one of the exhibit's curators, Marie Hélène Pereira, described as an effort to elevate key ecosystems and networks built and sustained by artists, which carry a clear sense of both localism and transnationalism in generative symbiosis." At the Biennale, Denniston Hill set up a curated space for visitors to meet, study or reflect.
