= Svea Josephy =

- Born: 1969 (age 56–57); Cape Town, South Africa
- Occupations: Senior Lecturer in Fine Art at Michaelis School of Fine Art, photographer

Svea Josephy is currently an Associate Professor in Fine Art (photography) at the Michaelis School of Fine Art at the University of Cape Town. She is best known for her work with "twin towns," where she draws parallels between settlements and suburbs surrounding South African cities to other places around the world. More recently she had contributed towards an artist led research, training and mutual learning programme, known as the sustainable darkroom, which promotes photographic practices that are environmentally friendly. Josephy's work has been displayed in numerous exhibitions both nationally and internationally.

== Background ==
Born in 1969, Svea Josephy was raised in Cape Town, South Africa and currently resides in Rondebosh, a primarily residential southern suburb of Cape Town. Josephy first became interested in photography when she was a child. She had a darkroom in her home when her stepfather went through an amateur photography phase, which prompted her interest in photography. Her first camera was an old Olympus Trip 35. Today however, she mostly uses a Hasselbald camera.

== Studies ==
Josephy completed her Bachelor of Arts (in Fine Art) at the Michaelis School of Fine Art at the University of Cape Town, in the late 1980s to early 1990s. Josephy then in 2001, completed her Master of Fine Arts cum laude at the University of Stellenbosch.

== Work ==
Josephy's primary focus in her photographic work has been the study of how identity and landscape are constructed. Specifically, she is most well known for drawing parallels between "twin towns" in South Africa and in other parts of the world. Her project of "twin towns" examines the peculiar names of South Africa's settlements and suburbs. Examples include: Sun City, Lost City, Lapland, Beverley Hills, Egoli, Cuba, Kosovo, Lusaka, Malibu, Hyde Park, Green Park, Lavender Hill, Athlone, Harare, Waterfront, Potsdam, Bosnia, Beirut, Iraq and Hanover Park. These names evoke certain images that can be connected and related to various parks, streets, cities and countries located all over the globe.

In 2016 Josephy exhibited Satellite Cities: Naming Worlds at the Wits Art Museum.

== Awards and scholarships ==
Josephy has received the following awards and scholarships: Prix du Ministre de la Culture DAKART 2010 9th biennial of Contemporary African Art, IFAM, Dakar, Senegal, the Gordon Institute for Performing and Creative Arts (GIPCA) Project Award (2009), National Arts Council Award (2008), the A.W. Mellon Emerging Scholars Award (2008), Malan Trust Curatorship Award (2007), Harry Crossley Scholarship (2000), Maggie Laubscher Scholarship (1999), Simon Gerson Prize (1993) and the Irma Stern Scholarship (1992).
