= Thabiso Sekgala =

South African photographer (1981–2014)

Thabiso Sekgala (1981 – 15 October 2014) was a South African photographer. His work was about "land, peoples’ movement, identity and the notion of home". Sekgala's photography was published in a book, Paradise (2014) and exhibited posthumously at the Hayward Gallery in London.

== Life and work ==
Sekgala was born in Soweto, a township in the suburbs of Johannesburg. He was raised by his grandmother in a settlement near Hammanskraal, in what was then the rural Bantustan (or "homeland") of KwaNdebele, 40 km north of the city of Pretoria.

He studied photography at Market Photo Workshop in Johannesburg from 2007 to 2008. His photographs were, in the words of Hannah Abel-Hirsch writing in the British Journal of Photography, "united by their exploration of the notion of home, and the social, political, or economic conditions that may shape our relationship to it."

In 2012 Sekgala and Philippe Chancel "travelled to Magopa to investigate the problem of contemporary restitution of land in the so-called Black Spots, from which black South Africans were expelled under the apartheid-era “forced removals” programme". In 2013 he lived in Kreuzberg in Berlin for a year-long residency at Künstlerhaus Bethanien and undertook a two month residency at HIWAR/Durant Al Funun in Amman, Jordan.

He committed suicide on 15 October 2014, aged 33, a few months after the death of his grandmother. He had a son and a daughter.

== Publications ==
=== Publications by Sekgala ===
- Paradise. Dortmund: Kettler, 2014. Edited by Nicola Müllerschön and Christoph Tannert. ISBN 978-3862063390. With essays by Simon Njami and Matthew Alexander Post (Post Brothers). Catalogue published on the occasion of an exhibition at Künstlerhaus Bethanien, Berlin.

=== Publications with contributions by Sekgala ===
- Shoe Shop. Johannesburg: Jacana, 2012. Edited by Marie-Hélène Gutberlet and Cara Snyman. ISBN 9781920196431. Includes "Where is home?" by Sekgala.
- Peregrinate: Field notes on time travel and space. South Africa: Goethe-Institut, 2013. By Sekgala, Mimi Cherono Ng'ok, and Musa N. Nxumalo.
- Recent Histories: Contemporary African Photography and Video Art. Göttingen: Steidl, 2017. ISBN 9783958293502. With an essay by Daniela Baumann. Published on the occasion of an exhibition at The Walther Collection, Neu-Ulm, Germany, 2017.

== Solo exhibitions ==
- Homeland, Market Photo Workshop, Johannesburg, 2011
- Here is Elsewhere, Hayward Gallery, London, 2019. Photographs from the series Homeland (2009–2011), Domestic (2012), Second Transition (2012), Running, Amman (2013) and Paradise (2013)

== Awards ==
- 2010: Tierney Fellowship, New York City

== See also ==
- History of South Africa (1994–present)
