= Mimi Cherono Ng'ok =

Kenyan photographer

- Born: 1983 (age 42–43)
- Citizenship: Nairobi Kenya
- Education: Michaelis School of Fine Art at the University of Cape Town (BFA, Photography)
- Occupation: Photographer
- Notable work: Voices: a Compilation of Testimonials: African Artists Living and Working in Cape Town and Surrounds; Peregrinate: Field Notes on Time Travel and Space
- Awards: Winner, Photo London Artproof Award, for her series Everyone is Lonely in Kigali 2017; Grant, Magnum Foundation Fund, 2017

Mimi Cherono Ng'ok (born 1983) is a Kenyan photographer, living in Nairobi. Her "photographs are a visual diary of the experiences and emotions emerging from her itinerant life". Ng'ok's work has been shown at the Hayward Gallery, Berlin Biennale, Carnegie International and African Photography Encounters, and is held in the Walther Collection.

== Early life and education ==
Ng'ok grew up in the rural outskirts of Nairobi, Kenya. In 2006 she graduated with a BFA from the Michaelis School of Fine Art at the University of Cape Town in South Africa.

== Photography ==
Her 2008 series I am Home, on African immigrants living in South Africa, deals with "issues of home, displacement, loss, and identity". A project begun in 2013, made in countries where she has lived and travelled, was described by Alexandra Genova in Time as "a series of vignettes on memory, loss and lust revealed through Ng'ok's experiences." Given that Ng'ok believes home is not a place, but a state of mind, Genova wrote that the work "explores this temporality through the intersection of people and place". Diane Smyth in the British Journal of Photography described Ng'ok's work in an exhibition called Africa State of Mind as giving "a personal interpretation of place, in contrast to the apparently objective lens of documentary photography".

Everyone is Lonely in Kigali was made in Dakar, Accra, Berlin, Abidjan, Kampala, Kigali, Nairobi and Johannesburg and includes her frequently used subject matter: trees, the tropics, horses and an unidentified male figure. The series Do You Miss Me? Sometimes, Not Always, was made over six months after October 2014, in the cities of Kigali, Abidjan, Kampala, and Nairobi in memory of her friend Thabiso Sekgala, who died.

== Publications with contributions by Ng'ok ==
- Voices: a Compilation of Testimonials: African Artists Living and Working in Cape Town and Surrounds. Cape Town: African Arts Institute, 2011. Edited by Rucera Seethal. ISBN 9780986989667.
- Peregrinate: Field Notes on Time Travel and Space. South Africa: Goethe-Institut, 2013. By Ng'ok, Thabiso Sekgala and Musa N. Nxumalo.

== Group exhibitions ==
- Peregrinate: Field Notes on Time Travel and Space, Makerere Art Gallery, Makerere University, Kampala, Uganda, 2015. Work by Ng'ok, Thabiso Sekgala and Musa N. Nxumalo.
- African Photography Encounters, Bamako, Mali, 2015. Included her series Do You Miss Me? Sometimes, Not Always
- Academy of Arts, Berlin, Berlin Biennale, 2018
- Carnegie International, Pittsburgh, Pennsylvania, 2018
- Africa State of Mind, New Art Exchange, Nottingham, UK, 2018
- S'thandwa Sami (My Beloved), Hayward Gallery, London, 2019. Work by Ng'ok and Thabiso Sekgala.

== Collections ==
Ng'ok's work is held in the following permanent collections:

- Walther Collection: 30 prints (as of April 2021)

== Awards ==
- 2017: Winner, Photo London Artproof Award, for her series Everyone is Lonely in Kigali
- 2017: Grant, Magnum Foundation Fund
