= Market Photo Workshop =

School of photography, gallery, and project space in Johannesburg, South Africa

- Founder: David Goldblatt
- Founded at: Bree Street, Newtown, Johannesburg
- Location: 138 Lilian Ngoyi Street, Newtown, Johannesburg
- Fields: Photography education
- Owner: Market Theatre Foundation
- Key people: Lekgetho James Makola
- Website: marketphotoworkshop.co.za

The Market Photo Workshop is a school of photography, a gallery, and a project space in Johannesburg, South Africa, founded in 1989 by David Goldblatt. It offers training in visual literacy for neglected and marginalized parts of South African society. Its courses are short foundation and intermediate, as well as longer advanced, and in photojournalism and documentary.

The Market Photo Workshop is a division of the Market Theatre Foundation.

== Remit ==
The Market Photo Workshop offers training in visual literacy for neglected and marginalized parts of South African society. Early on, its visual output focused on social documentary photography, but has now expanded to include "more expressive, conceptual, and self oriented or community-focused work".

"At its core, apartheid sought to create a black underclass denied of any imaginative agency. Imagination, therefore, is necessarily subversive. To focus only on technique, without cultivating a critical vocabulary of image-making, would have reinforced the logic of apartheid, which accommodated for low-level black artisans."

== Courses ==
- Foundation Course in Photography – 3 months, full-time
- Intermediate Course in Photography – 3 months, full-time
- Advanced Programme in Photography – 20 weeks, full-time
- Photojournalism and Documentary Photography Programme – 1 year, full-time

== History ==
The Market Photo Workshop has its origins in David Goldblatt curating a photography exhibition in the Market Theatre for its opening in 1976, continuing to host exhibitions there in the 1970s and 1980s, and eventually setting up a small gallery there. In order to set up Market Photo Workshop, Jeremy Ractliffe, father of photographer Jo Ractliffe, secured funding from the DG Murray Trust. The Market Photo Workshop opened in what had been the Newtown post office in Bree Street. It has since moved twice within Newtown, most recently to Lilian Ngoyi Street.

A public gallery space was launched in 2005 called The Photo Workshop Gallery. Since moving to Lilian Ngoyi Street, an additional gallery has been added, Gallery 1989. It shows the work of both local and international photographers.

John Fleetwood ran the school from 2002 to 2015. As of 2021 Lekgetho James Makola is its current director.

Since 2005, the Market Theatre Foundation has been administered by the national government's Department of Arts and Culture.

== Alumni ==
- Jodi Bieber
- John Fleetwood
- Lebohang Kganye
- Phumzile Khanyile
- Sabelo Mlangeni
- Mimi Cherono Ng'ok
- Thabiso Sekgala
- Lindokuhle Sobekwa
- Zanele Muholi
- Nontsikelelo Veleko
