= Graeme Williams =

South African photographer (born 1961)

Graeme Williams (born 1961) is a South African photographer known for both his photojournalism during the transition to democracy in South Africa and his documentary projects post-apartheid.

== Career ==
Williams was born in Cape Town in 1961, where he went on to earn his Bachelor of Science in Geology and Statistics at the University of Cape Town. His first job as a photographer was for the Cape Times as a property photographer. After moving to Johannesburg in 1988, he began to work for Reuters in 1989 photographing opposition to apartheid and the transition from apartheid to the African National Congress. In 1991, he began to contribute to Afrapix, a collective of documentary photographers depicting apartheid to be used in newspapers around the world.

Williams worked as a photojournalist until 1994. In a video for the Victoria and Albert Museum, Williams said: "towards the end of ninety-four I had a real strong feeling that I'd never really wanted to be a photojournalistic type photographer or to cover war and violence. I made a very strong stand almost to say, 'OK I'm going to stop that completely,' and I never did that sort of hard photojournalism news again." After South Africa's transition to democracy, Williams focused on magazine features and documentary projects. Many of his photographs concentrate on South African society and documenting the personal lives of individuals.

Williams has had work published in South African and international publications, including: National Geographic, Time, Newsweek, Stern, Sunday Telegraph Magazine, New York Times Magazine, Photography (UK), Marie Claire (UK), The Guardian Weekend Magazine, Leadership (South Africa), Los Angeles Times, Sunday Times (UK), The Evening Standard Magazine (UK), Die Woche (Germany), Die Zeit, Greenpeace, Optima (SA), The Scotsman, The Financial Times (UK), The Baltimore Sun, The Independent, The Australian, and Colors.

== Publications ==
=== Publications by Williams ===
- The Floor. Auckland Park [Johannesburg]: Purple Box, 1996. ISBN 0620207817. Photographs by Williams, text by David Gleason. Documenting the last year of open outcry trading in the Johannesburg Stock Exchange.
- The Inner City: Exploring isolation through life in Johannesburg. Auckland Park [Johannesburg]: Purple Box, 2000. ISBN 0869755331. Documenting Johannesburg and the city's struggles with adapting to a changing political atmosphere.
- Graeme Williams Photographe = Graeme Williams Photographer. Montreuil: Éditions de l'oeil, 2010. ISBN 9782351370858. Text (in French and English) by Gary Van Wyk.
- The Edge of Town. South Africa: Cactus Press, 2008. OCLC 927141178. Linden: Highveld Press, 2011. ISBN 9780620501590.
- A City Refracted. Johannesburg: Jacana Media, 2015. ISBN 9781431421640.

=== Publications with contributions by Williams ===
- Paul Weinberg, ed. Then & Now: Eight South African Photographers. Johannesburg: Highveld Press, 2008. ISBN 9780620423274. Presenting work by David Goldblatt, George Hallett, Eric Miller, Cedric Nunn, Guy Tillim, Paul Weinberg, Graeme Williams, Gisèle Wulfsohn.
- Figures and Fictions: Contemporary South African Photography. Göttingen: Steidl; London: Victoria and Albert Museum, 2011. ISBN 9783869302669; ISBN 9783869303062. Photographs by David Goldblatt, Santu Mofokeng, Guy Tillim, Pieter Hugo, Zwelethu Mthethwa, Berni Searle, Jodi Bieber, Terry Kurgan, Zanele Muholi, Hasan and Husain Essop, Roelof van Wyk, Graeme Williams, Kudzanai Chiurai, Sabelo Mlangeni, Jo Ractliffe, Mikhael Subotzky, and Nontsikelelo Veleko.

== Awards ==
- 2011: Picture Essay Documentary award and exhibition that traveled to all major South African cities.
- 2013: Ernest Cole Award, University of Cape Town, for A city refracted

== Collections ==
Williams's work is held in the following permanent public collections:

- University of Cape Town, South Africa
- National Museum of African Art, Washington, D.C.
