= Eric Miller (photographer) =

South African photographer (born 1955)

Eric Miller (born 1955) is a professional photographer based in South Africa. Miller was born in Cape Town but spent his childhood in Johannesburg. After studying psychology and working in the corporate world for several years, Miller was driven by the injustices of apartheid to use his hobby, photography, to document opposition to apartheid by becoming a full-time photographer.

== Career ==
Miller began his work as a freelance photographer with a collective called Afrapix, which used photography to document the realities of apartheid and the resistance to the regime during the 1980s. Miller first got the attention of the international wire services with a photograph of a mineworker and his partner in a room of a mineworkers' hostel. The photo was particularly meaningful as the unions were fighting for family housing for mine workers, rather than single-sex hostels which forced workers to leave their families behind to make a living. Soon after, Miller was hired for his first international lead, taking photographs of the 1987 strike in which over 300,000 mine workers across South Africa walked off the job. The majority of Miller's work early in his career was the documentation of strikes, protests and funerals which were manifestations of people's opposition to the apartheid regime and contributed to its eventual downfall. For three years from 1988, Miller worked for Reuters.

During the early 1990s, as the world witnessed the crumbling of the apartheid government, the subject matter of Miller's work changed from protests and funerals to the negotiations that would eventually lead to a democratic South Africa. Once the transition to a post-apartheid government began, the focus of his and others' photography was on transformation issues such as health, education and labour.

After Nelson Mandela's release from prison in February 1990, Miller gained access to countries across Africa that had previously been closed to South African passport holders. The first place Miller travelled to after Mandela's release was South Sudan, to document the famine that occurred there in the 1990s. He has pursued photographic projects in 28 different countries including Botswana, Cuba, Democratic Republic of the Congo, Liberia, Namibia, Nigeria, Sierra Leone, Eritrea, Rwanda, Senegal, Sudan, Uganda, Vietnam and Zimbabwe.

Although Miller spent much time and effort documenting South Africa's first democratic election during April 1994, he was also able to travel to Rwanda to document the last 10 days of the genocide there. He then documented the conditions of the (primarily Tutsi) victims of the atrocity who fled to refugee camps in Tanzania. His work reflects not only the internal chaos and violence caused by the genocide in Rwanda, but also the lasting effects for those who were forced to flee, and the problems faced by the neighbouring countries to which they fled. Miller's collection of photographs from Rwanda was more recently used in a project which he presented at the University of Cape Town during a symposium on post-apartheid and post-genocide transitions and violence in South Africa and Rwanda.

During Miller's numerous visits to Uganda, he focused on the devastating effects of the war waged by Joseph Kony and the Lord's Resistance Army (LRA) on every sector of the population. He documented the issue of child soldiers, and spent time getting to know young adults who had escaped from the LRA after being forced, as children, to become its soldiers.

Miller is currently a member of the Panos Pictures photo agency.

== Work with news outlets ==
Miller's photographs have been published in many print publications around the world. He has spent several years working for the wire services such as the Associated Press and Reuters. He has completed assignments for The New York Times and Time, Los Angeles Times, Boston Globe, and several Washington D.C. area newspapers.

== Exhibitions ==
Miller has been involved in several photographic exhibitions.

His photography was shown in Then and Now, an exhibition which travelled to Cape Town, Durban, Johannesburg, Melbourne and Brisbane, and is housed at Duke University. The project, curated by fellow South African photographer Paul Weinberg in 2008, presented the work of several Afrapix photographers and contrasted their work under apartheid with work done post-apartheid.

Miller contributed to the exhibition "The Nevergiveups." (Note: This has its own website at thenevergiveups.org.) The work chronicles the strength of grandmothers in Khayelitsha township who have been forced by the consequences of the HIV/AIDS pandemic to unexpectedly become primary caregivers responsible for the raising of their grandchildren orphaned by HIV/AIDS. The exhibition was shown at Katzen Arts Center, American University in Washington D.C. and Old Dominion University in Virginia in late 2013.

== Publications ==
Miller has worked on assignments for a range of organisations including the United Nations, the World Bank, Amnesty International and the Red Cross; and World Economic Forum, the World Health Organization, local health departments and South African and International NGOs. His educational video on HIV/AIDS has been distributed for viewing at high schools around the Western Cape. Miller's story on counteracting stereotypes of Islamic education appeared in The Chronicle of Higher Education.

== Books with contributions by Miller ==
- Eric Miller (photos). Thula Baba. Johannesburg: Ravan Press, 1987. ISBN 0869753231. According to the title page: "This story was written after many discussions between groups of adult learners and teachers in literary classes. It is based on the lives of some domestic workers in a city. The photographs were taken by Eric Miller (Afrapix) to illustrate the text." (Note: A review of the book that first appeared in Agenda: Empowering women for gender equity vol 2 (1988), pp. 64–66 can be found here (Taylor & Francis). (Pp. 65–66 of this are behind a paywall.))
- Eric Miller (photos). Thula Baba. Vom Leben einiger Hausangestellter in einer südafrikanischen Grossstadt. Erlangen: Verlag der Evangelisch-lutherischen Mission, 1989. ISBN 3-87214-231-3. A German-language version.
- Eric Miller (photos). Thula Baba: «Pleure pas mon bébé». Lausanne: Éditions d'en bas, 1990. ISBN 2-8290-0123-0. A French-language version. (Note: An abridged version ("preview") is available here at Google Books. What is visible here does not identify the photographer.)
- Görrel Espeluend and Jesper Strudsholm (text), Eric Miller (photos). Reality Bites: An African Decade. Cape Town: Double Storey, 2003. ISBN 978-1-919930-22-0. The photography challenges prevalent stereotypes about Africa. It presents the stories of those who make the most of desperate circumstances to make positive changes in their communities.
- Gillian Warren-Brown and Yazeed Fakier (text), Eric Miller (photos). Cape Town Uncovered: A People's City. Cape Town: Double Storey, 2005. ISBN 978-1-919930-75-6. Demonstrates the realities of the life and people of Cape Town. It serves as a contrast to photographic projects that typically only show the landscapes and scenery of Cape Town and do not highlight the beauty of the individuals living there.
- Eric Miller (photos), Karen Jeynes (text). Fab: Mother City Queer Projects. Roggebaai: Umuzi, 2007. ISBN 978-1-415200-35-3. Documents the Mother City Queer Project, in particular the group’s yearly party which began in 1994 under a new democratic South Africa.
- Paul Weinberg, ed. Then and Now: Eight South African Photographers. Johannesburg: Highveld, 2007. ISBN 0-620-39407-2. Photographs taken during and after apartheid by Miller, David Goldblatt, George Hallett, Cedric Nunn, Guy Tillim, Paul Weinberg, Graeme Williams and Gisèle Wulfsohn. Miller's photographs occupy pages 52 to 69.
- Leonie Joubert (text), Eric Miller (photos). The Hungry Season: Feeding Southern Africa’s Cities. Johannesburg: Picador Africa, 2012. ISBN 1770102299.
- Jo-Anne Smetherham (text), Eric Miller (photos). The Nevergiveups: The Extraordinary Life Stories of Six South African Grandmothers. N.p.: CreateSpace, 2013. ISBN 1492756334.
