= Gisèle Wulfsohn =

South African photographer (1957–2011)

- Born: 18 March 1957; Rustenburg, South Africa
- Died: 27 December 2011 (aged 54); Johannesburg, South Africa
- Occupation: Photographer
- Known for: HIV/AIDS documentation in South Africa
- Spouse: Mark Turpin
- Children: Joseph; Samuel

Gisèle Wulfsohn (18 March 1957 – 27 December 2011) was a South African photographer. Wulfsohn was a newspaper, magazine, and freelance photographer specialising on portrait, education, health and gender issues. She was known for documenting various HIV/AIDS awareness campaigns. She died in 2011 from lung cancer.

== Early life ==
Wulfsohn was born on 18 March in Rustenburg, North West, South Africa. She attended Rustenburg Primary and Kingsmead College in Johannesburg, but matriculated at Selly Park Convent. She attended Johannesburg College of Art, where she studied graphic fine art from 1975 to 1977.

== Career ==
Wulfsohn started her professional career as darkroom assistant in 1979 and asking for a photographer position when the vacancy became available. At first, The Star replied with the fact that they did not hire women photographers. Wulfsohn responded "It's time you did" and finally got the job. She worked on portraits for the 'Star Women' section and 'The Women's Page'. After working for four years at The Star, she moved to STYLE magazine in 1983, and in 1986, she was appointed chief photographer at Leadership Magazine. In March 1987, she went freelance and joined Afrapix as full member with Guy Tillim, Santu Mofokeng and Cedric Nunn.

=== Projects about Apartheid ===
The development of her political awareness started when she travelled to Europe in 1979 and was exposed to banned literature, Ernest Cole's famous book House of Bondage. Wulfsohn became more intensely aware of social inequality when she was met with other photographers for a project called South Africa: The Cordoned Heart which documented black poverty in South Africa. She preferred to document how apartheid shaped the lives of South African's citizens rather than violence and conflict which happened between protesters and the police. One of her projects, which started in 1990, was called Malibongwe. She was also taking photos of South African women activists who worked hard to establish democracy in South Africa. Motivation to start these projects was based on her experience in Afrafix. These photographs formed the Malibongwe, Let Us Praise the Women exhibition, curated by the Apartheid Museum to commemorate the 50th anniversary of the Women's March in 1956 and were displayed in Johannesburg in 2006.

In 1994, she was employed by the Independent Electoral Commission with Paul Weinberg, Henner Frankenfeld and Graeme Williams to document the first democratic general elections in South Africa. These photos were published in a book called An End to Waiting.

== Work with HIV/AIDS ==
Starting in late 1987, Wulfsohn documented various HIV/AIDS awareness initiatives. This project was started because of a request from her cousin to give a face to AIDS in South Africa. Wulfsohn found that the Johannesburg Health Department established an HIV education play that was performed in clinics to increase condom use. The plays were performed by a group called the City Health Acting Troupe (CHAT). She documented the actors as they performed. The plays were usually performed at waiting rooms and other public spaces, such as the Joubert Park Clinic. Wulfsohn started this work in 1987 and end it at 1990. She worked with Gary Friedman in the Puppets against Aids project in Diepkloof Prison in 1996.

In 1999–2000, while working for the Department of Health in Beyond Awareness campaign, she shot a series of photographs of 31 South Africans telling the public that they have HIV/AIDS. These photographs called "Living Openly" was published in newspapers and magazines around South Africa, and were displayed at the Durban International Aids Conference in July 2000. The "Living Openly" project was showing in a TV documentary which was broadcast four times in August 2000. This exhibition has been displayed at numerous centres and conferences, such as the Aids in Context Conference at University of the Witwatersrand in April 2001 and the Healing Through Creative Arts Conference at Museum Africa, in Johannesburg in November and December 2001.

Wulfsohn's commitment to documenting the struggle against HIV and AIDS in South Africa continued over 20 years and was regarded as seminal.

== Other professional work ==
She was hired by OXFAM UK and Frances Lincoln Publishers in 2000 to take the photographs for a children's counting book, called One Child, One Seed, set in rural KwaZulu Natal. After illustrating One Child, One Seed, she was asked by the same publisher to write and illustrate Bongani's Day – A Day in the Life of a South African Child.

Wulfsohn worked with many national and international NGOs, including the Nelson Mandela Foundation, Mindset, NBI (National Business Initiative), and ActionAid UK. She also produced portraits of seven South African Constitutional Court Judges, which hang in the public art area of the Constitutional Court.

A number of Wulfsohn's pictures were included in the 'Then and Now' publication, in which the work of eight South African photographers who worked during and after the apartheid era is highlighted. Six of her images are included in the 'Rise and Fall of Apartheid' exhibition. Her photographs were published in The Lancet, Mother Jones, The Economist, Marie Claire and Der Spiegel.

== Exhibitions ==
=== Solo exhibitions ===
- Living Openly. Bat Centre, Durban, July 2000.
- Malibongwe – Let us Praise the Women. Travelling exhibition. Apartheid Museum October 2006/Nelson Mandela Foundation/Parliament Cape Town/ Slave Lodge Cape Town/ Rwanda 2013

=== Group exhibitions ===
- Living Openly, Bonanai Africa, Museum Afrika, 2002.
- SA Women's Projects, Bonani Africa, Museum Afrika 2002.
- The Fatherhood Project, Museum Afrika 2004.
- Then & Now. Travelling exhibition South Africa, Europe, USA, Australia 2007.
- Rise & Fall of Apartheid, 2013–2014, USA, Europe, South Africa (Museum Afrika)
- Ngezinyawo – Migrant Journeys, Wits Art Museum, 2014
- Between States of Emergency, Nelson Mandela Foundation, 2015

== Death and legacy ==
Wulfsohn was diagnosed with inoperable lung cancer in 2005, and lived until 27 December 2011. She left behind a husband, Mark Turpin, and twin sons Joseph and Samuel.

The Centre for The Study of AIDS at the University of Pretoria produced an illustrated calendar of her work just before she died.

After she died a bursary in her name was established by her family and friends at the Market Photo Workshop in Johannesburg to support young photographers committed to using photography to document important social issues. The first bursary recipient was Sydelle Willow Smith, and her solo exhibition 'Soft Walls' was displayed at the Market Photo Workshop and in Cape Town. The 2014/15 bursary recipient was Siphosihle Mkhwanazi and his 'Usual Suspect' exhibition opened in June 2015. Phumzile Khanyile was appointed as the third bursary recipient for 2015/16. Her 'Plastic Crowns' exhibition, focusing on issues of gender and identity, opened at the Market Photo Workshop in February 2017 and was a winning submission for the 2018 Contemporary African Photography Prize. The fourth recipient of the Mentorship was Thembinkosi Hlatshwayo, and his 'Slaghuis II' exhibition opened at the Market Photo Workshop in February 2020.

A major retrospective exhibition of Wulfsohn's photographic work was opened at the Wits Art Museum in August 2022.
