= Springbokpan =

Springbokpan.
- Suburb
- Location within South Africa
- Coordinates: 26.116°S 25.774°E
- Country: South Africa
- Settled: 1930

Springbokpan is a small suburb along National Road R503 in South Africa, settled near the border of the larger town of Bodibe,

Springbokpan is settled by around 100 residents. The village was first occupied by Nguni speakers who arrived in the area in 1930's from Kwa-Zulu Natal. The first families to arrive were Shabalala's, Dlamini, Mazibuko Ntuli and so on. One of the prominent leaders, who was also a respected farmer, was Titus Shabalala.

== See also ==
- Economy of South Africa
- History of South Africa
