= Nontsikelelo Veleko =

South African photographer (born 1977)

Nontsikelelo "Lolo" Veleko
- Born: Nontsikelelo Veleko; 19 August 1977 (age 48); Bodibe, South Africa
- Education: Market Theatre (Johannesburg)
- Known for: Photography
- Awards: Standard Bank Young Artist for Visual Art

Nontsikelelo "Lolo" Veleko (born 19 August 1977) is a South African photographer most noted for her depiction of black identity, urbanisation and fashion in post-apartheid South Africa.

== Early life and education ==
Veleko was born on (19 August 1977 in Bodibe, North West (South African province)). She studied from 1995 to 2003 at the Cape Technikon in Cape Town and attended Luhlaza High School in Khayelitsha. In 1995, she studied graphic design at the Cape Technikon. After moving to Johannesburg, she studied photography at the Market Theatre Photo Workshop (1999–2004), the institution that was organized by David Goldblatt, who provide the formal training to young photographers.

== Work ==
In 2003, Veleko documented graffiti throughout Cape Town and Johannesburg, a series she titles The ones on top won't make it Stop! in her first solo exhibition at the Johannesburg Art Gallery. These photographs encapsulated the social and political atmosphere of post-apartheid South Africa. This same year, Veleko was nominated for the MTN New Contemporaries Arts Awards. This competition identifies four rising South African artists and selects a winner. Throughout the next couple of years, her work was showcased in various exhibitions throughout South Africa, Europe and Australia.

In 2006, her photographs were part of the group exhibition Snap Judgments: New Positions in Contemporary African Photography, at the International Center of Photography (ICP) in New York. This work portrays particularly, defines Veleko's contrats the stereotypes which are associated with gender and race depicting South Africa street style from her series Beauty is in the Eye of the Beholder from (2003), which focused on subjects born after 1994, attracted a great deal of attention and international acclaim, shifting previous perceptions of Africa as a whole on an international scale. Veleko explains that she looks at fashion “and how it creates identity, because fashion plays with identity”. In regards to the title of the series, she states: “I thought the way I see beauty and the way I perceive beauty might be different to someone else next to me...So the project is called Beauty is in the Eye of the Beholder, because for me they are beautiful.” She even gives various reasons for this project. When people look at those people who have dressed differently they would ask: 'How can you dress up in yellow pants and a little green jersey with stripes? She perceives her views in a different way which is a project called Beauty Is In The Eyes Of The Beholder, because for her it was all about drawing attention around issues of beauty by capturing real people. It was also about street fashion that she did not think about that they are just promoting themselves, which she displays where she has lived it and used to be one of those people. In short, it was clear that images were created by her because of the color choices and facial expressions of that characters held with the viewer. Alongside this, Veleko has also included clothing in her projects "to deliberately challenge assumptions of identity based on appearances and historical background". Such is evident in her more personal project from 2002, www.notblackenough.lolo, which depicted an exploration of mixed cultural and racial identity through different costumes of role play.

In 2006, Veleko's work was also exhibited in Personae & Scenarios-the new African photography at the Brancolini Grimaldi Arte Contemporanea in Rome, Italy. That same year, her photographs were displayed in the exhibition titled Olvida Quien Soy- Erase Me from Who I Am at the Centro Atlantico de Arte Mordeno in Las Palmas, Canary Islands. In 2007, Veleko's work and reputation reached a larger international audience with her work being exhibited throughout Southern Africa, Europe, Asia, North and South America. She has also been a part of shows such as 7th Recontres Africaines de la Photographie exhibition. During this year, she also received a two-month residency with the International Photographic Research Network (IPRN) in the UK where she explored the notions of work, identity and clothes.

In 2008, Veleko was the second photographer to be awarded the Standard Bank Young Artist for Visual Art for her traveling exhibition Wonderland. This focuses on familiar aspects of her previous work such as fashionable street-goers, primarily younger adults, as well as graffiti and personal spaces. Through exploration of such subjects Veleko continues to delve deeper and defy clichés of outdated perceptions of South Africans, and Africans in a larger context, that have been largely focused on the notions of fashion and the way of life. Wonderland not only displays the unique personalities of eclectically dressed urbanites but also captures the cosmopolitan nature of cities such as Cape Town, Johannesburg and Durban.

Veleko's work presents a strong statement of a younger generation that is loud, self-expressive and daring; a collection of youth she strongly relates to. Such sentiments are evident in the photographs resulting from what she considers to be a "collaborative process". The portraits are taken after being granted permission from the subjects. She gives copies of the photos to their rightful owners and invites them to the exhibition openings. For the ongoing series of graffiti shots The ones on top won't make it Stop, Veleko met the graffiti artists and continued to follow the progress of those whose style she favoured.

Graffiti, like photography is a form of visual communication. It is a vehicle which informs society about the range of socio-political issues that affect us; it gets people's messages across in a, public, 'in your face' way; it evokes powerful emotion. To me, it is more than merely a visual message...it is poetry... — Nontsikelelo "Lolo" Veleko, These Words Are Like Swords...

In 2017 Veleko co-curated 'Resist(e) – Printemps Photographique Afrique du Sud 2017' at Gallery NegPos in Nîmes, France with Patrice Loubon of Gallery NegPos. In 2019, her work 'banned nudes,' Les nus interdits, was on exhibit in Les Docks in Aries, France after being shot on the Island of Reunion. She was also a project manager/co-coordinator at the Market Photo Workshop, where she was previously a student.

== Personal life ==
Veleko, as of 2017, lives and works in France.

== Reception ==
In discussion of her photography, Mark Stevens wrote in the New York Magazine Art Review, "It was a shock- an awakening shock- to come upon the bursting contemporary colours worn by the fashion-struck people portrayed by Nontsikelelo "Lolo" Veleko on the streets of Johannesburg". Critic Leslie Camhi has related the fashion-savvy subjects of Veleko's street portraits to the widely recognisable image of "hipsters" "dressed in electric, Kool-Aid colours [whose] incorrigible chic and appropriations of Western icons...proclaim them heirs to Ke dandified Bamakois bourgeoisie". Leslie Camhi of The Village Voice (2006) further noted:

If independence has a style, this is it—vivid, highly individualised, and a touch defiant. These images are antidotes to the prevailing view of the "dark continent" as a place of entropy and despair; these are people in charge of at least their own sartorial destiny.

== Publications ==
=== Books ===
- Maart, B; T. J. Lemon. Introduction by David Goldblatt. 2002. SHARP: The Market Photography Workshop. The Market Photography Workshop, Johannesburg, South Africa.
- The Fatherhood Project: 2003–2004. Child, Youth and Family Development (CYFD), Human Sciences Research Council, HSRC Press, Pretoria, South Africa, 2004.
- Perryer, S (ed). 2004. 10 Years 100 Artists: Art in a Democratic South Africa. Bell Roberts Publishing in association with Struik Publishing, Cape Town, South Africa. ISBN 1868729877
- Comely, R; G. Hallett; N. Neo (eds). 2006. Woman by Woman: 50 Years of Women’s Photography in South Africa. Wits University Press, Johannesburg, South Africa.

=== Catalogues ===
- Smith, Kathryn 2003. MTN New Contemporaries. MTN, Johannesburg.
- Damsbo, Mads. 2004. Unsettled: 8 South African Photographers, The National Museum of Photography, The Royal Library, Copenhagen.
- Waselchuk, Lori. 2004. Is e.verybody comfortable.
- Enwezor, Okwui. 2006. Snap Judgments: New Positions in Contemporary African Photography. International Center of Photography, New York.
- Lehtonen, Kimmo (ed). 2007. IPRN Changing Faces #3. Van Wyk, Gary (ed). 2004. A Decade of Democracy: Witnessing South Africa. Sondela, Boston.
- Vergon, Henri 2007. Two Years of Afronova. Afronova, Johannesburg.

== Exhibitions ==
=== Solo exhibitions ===
- 2002–2003 The Ones on Top Won't Make It Stop!, The Kuppel, Basel, Switzerland, 2002; Women's Arts Festival, Johannesburg Art Gallery and Market Theatre Galleries, Johannesburg, South Africa, 2003
- 2007 SCREAM! MUTE! SCREAM!, Goodman Gallery, Johannesburg, South Africa
- 2008-9 Wonderland, Standard Bank Young Artist Award, national travelling exhibition, including National Arts Festival Grahamstown, Grahamstown; Durban Art Gallery, Durban; Iziko South African National Gallery, Cape Town; Standard Bank Gallery, Johannesburg, South Africa

=== Group exhibition ===
- 2011 Figures & Fictions: Contemporary South African Photography, Victoria and Albert Museum, London, 2011.

== Bibliography ==
- Perryer, Sophie (2004). 10 Years 100 Artists: Art In A Democratic South Africa. Cape Town: Struik. ISBN 1868729877.
