= Francesca Bartellini =

Italian director and screenwriter

- Born: Italy
- Occupation: Historian
- Known for: Research on Italian Jews, Jewish emancipation, Jewish-Catholic relations

Academic background
- Education: Laurea in History (Sapienza University of Rome); PhD in History (Sapienza University of Rome)
- Alma mater: Sapienza University of Rome

Academic work
- Discipline: History
- Sub-discipline: Jewish history; Italian Jewish history; Modern European history; Religious history
- Institutions: University of Pisa
- Notable works: The Jews of Rome after 1870: Between Modernity and Tradition; Il purgatorio delle modernità. Ebrei ed emancipazione nell'Europa del primo Ottocento

Francesca Bartellini (born 14 December Milan) is an Italian film director, playwright, screenwriter and actress in theatre and cinema.

== Biography ==
Francesca Bartellini has a degree in History of Philosophy at Universita Statale in Milan and a Master in Renaissance Philosophy at Ecole des Hautes Etudes in Paris. She studied acting and directing with various teachers but mostly with John Strasberg. She has worked from 1988 as an actress, writer and director in the States and in Europe working also with Valentina Fratti's theatre company in New York and Jane Campion. She started her career working at the Organic Theater Company in Chicago. Her first plays have qualified as finalists in writing competitions at the Steppenwolf Theatre Company in Chicago and at the Cleveland Public Theater.

During long periods of time spent in Africa she has filmed several projects, including two documentaries in South Africa working under commission for Unesco at the Women and culture of peace department. She has also filmed the first pan-African conference on Women and a culture of peace in Zanzibar, Tanzania. She has then continued directing documentaries in Africa and Europe collaborating also with South African photographer Guy Tillim as Dop. Her short film Demetra’s Dream stars the actor Julian Sands.

She has been member of the jury in 2012 for the Solinas Documentary Prize in Rome and in 2011 for the Pan-African Festival in Cannes.

She has received in 2014 the Cultural prize ‘Luciano Bonaparte, principe di Canino’ by the Region and Provincia of Lazio. In the same year, in Viterbo at Palazzo dei Papi, she has participated sharing the stage with the actor Giancarlo Giannini at the International Festival QDA with the theatrical project ‘Sermones/Life of the Virgin Mary’.

Recently she has also started teaching in Paris and Italy acting technique in theatre and movies as well as specific workshops on Shakespeare.

== Filmography ==
=== Actress ===
- The Portrait of a Lady (1996) Role : Isabel's maid
- The Bible : David (TV) (1997) Role : Woman of Tekoah
- The Nicholas's gift (1998) Role: Nurse
- Chère Marianne (2001) Role: Mme Leo
- Demetra's Dream ^{[2]} (2008) Role: Rosa-Ecate

=== Author/Director ===
- One Day on the path (1999)
- Ubuntu: notes on forgiveness ^{[3]}(2001)
- Yannis et les autres - Voyage musical de Olympos à la Calibre (2005)
- Ma come il vento muove il mare ^{[4]} (2007)
- Demetra's Dream ^{[16]}(2008)
- Les laboratoires des crais (2009)
- Monicelli, Le paien ^{[5]} ^{[15]}(2013)

== Theatre ==
- Prostitutki (Playwright) ^{[11]} 1993, New York
- The Supposed Person ^{[6]}(Playwright ed Actress) 1999, Paris
- Menippo sulla luna^{[7]} (Co-writer, Director) 2004, Athens
- La Febbre ^{[8]} (Co-writer, Director) 2012, Milan
- Sermones ^{[9]} (Playwright, Actress) 2017, Milan

== Books ==
- Shakespeare e Donne, La perdita della sfera del fuoco e la nascita del fuoco d’amore o come la Modernità nasce perdendo la natura, Joker Edizioni, 2010
- Sermones, in AA VV, Teatro Aperto, Joker edizioni,2012

== Other sources ==
1. Demetra's dream on Youtube
2. Documentary UBUNTU su www.film-documentaire.fr
3. Ma come il vento muove il mare, documentary about Sandro Penna in rai's archives
4. Monicelli Le paien, documentary tvmag10, www.lefigaro.fr
5. Articolo del Paris Voice su "The Supposed Person"
6. "Menippo sulla Luna" in Epikolono
7. Giulio Casale's interview autore de "La Febbre"
8. Corriere della Sera's article about "Sermones"
9. Laura Ciulli's interviews Francesca Bartellini
10. The Miranda Theatre Company Archives
11. where she is amongst the international participants
12. Extract from Cinemaitaliano.info
13. "La tuscia ricorda il regista che la amava" su Viterbopost.it
14. Demetra's Dream at RIFF, Rome Independent Film Festival

== Links ==
- Production's House www.calibanstudios.it
- Francesca Bartellini su IMDB
