= Bodibe =

Bodibe may refer to:

- Tumelo Bodibe, cricketer
- Bodibe, South Africa, town
