= Gille de Vlieg =

- Born: Gillian Ruth Hemson; 26 July 1940 (age 86); Plymouth, England
- Occupation: Photographer
- Years active: 1980s – present
- Known for: Anti-apartheid activist

Gille de Vlieg (born 26 July 1940) is a South African photographer and anti-apartheid activist. She was born in England and moved to South Africa with her mother when she was 3 years old. During apartheid she was a member of both the Black Sash and one of the few women members of the Afrapix photography collective. Her images have been published in newspapers, magazines and books nationally and internationally. Unlike many of her counterparts, de Vlieg received little public acclaim for her work up until recently. About her work, she says, "I wanted to make a contribution to an alternative view of South Africa, a view not seen on the South African TV screen then." Her images cover the following topics: land removals, rural lifestyle, township lifestyle, gender lifestyle, United Democratic Front (UDF), anti-harassment campaign, police violence, protests against death penalty, funerals, Black Sash, protests against incorporation into Bophuthatswana; Release Mandela Campaign, End Conscription Campaign (ECC), conscientious objectors, African National Congress (ANC) Welcome Home Rally, Day of the Vow (Geloftedag), street children, and homeless people.

== Life ==
Gille de Vlieg was born Gillian Ruth Hemson in Plymouth, England in 1940 during a Nazi bombing raid on the city. After losing their home in a later bombing raid, she and her mother relocated to Durban, South Africa in February 1944. Her father had been sent by the Admiralty (Royal Navy) to work on radar installations at the Simon's Town Naval Base and later on Salisbury Island, Durban.

In 1958, de Vlieg was trained as a nurse at Greys Hospital in Pietermaritzburg. After finishing her diploma, she worked in London and met her first husband, Iain Paton Millar, a journalist. After a short period in Katanga Province of the DRC she moved to Johannesburg in 1963, where her daughters Ruth and Katherine were born. Katherine died when nine months old and her marriage to Iain disintegrated just prior to the birth of her son, Andrew. She lived for a time in Botha's Hill and Durban where she met and married Rob de Vlieg, a sail maker. They moved back to Johannesburg to set up his business in 1975. It was not until 1982 that she joined the Johannesburg Black Sash as a volunteer and she was soon put onto their regional committee and became a vice-chairperson. It was during the height of student riots in Tembisa in 1984 that Gille de Vlieg first made contact with Greg Thulare, an organiser for COSAS in Tembisa. She was slowly introduced to the politics of the UDF and ANC during this time. One of her responsibilities at Black Sash was to work with rural communities which were threatened with removal to the homelands, and she soon became interested in taking photos. When Paul Weinberg asked her to join Afrapix, she replied, "Okay, I will come to work for Afrapix, but I'm not working as a secretary, I want to be a photographer." She had a camera and a couple of lenses but knew very little about photography. Paul Weinberg taught her how to process the film and Cedric Nunn taught her how to print. She quickly realised she could use photography as a means of protest. The next several years she spent documenting various townships and rural areas mostly in the former Transvaal. As it was then illegal for a white woman to enter the black townships, she lied to get a permit from the Tembisa Council and eventually was allowed into Tembisa under the guise of taking pictures for Anglo American. While working in Tembisa, she met other members of COSAS including Debra Marakalala, Sipho (Sandile) Qwabe, Tshepo Mphuti and Reuben Mahlagare. Trust developed between them and de Vlieg. Her house in the safe northern suburbs of Johannesburg was often used as a hideout when the police were looking for COSAS activists. In June 1986, de Vlieg was arrested after a raid on her house, initially under Section 50 of the Internal Security Act, and taken to John Vorster Square and then to the Hillbrow police station for thirty-seven days. De Vlieg now lives on the KwaZulu-Natal North Coast.

== Photography ==
Gille de Vlieg was an activist before she was a photographer, coming to photography through her work with the Black Sash. Many of her images formed part of the Afrapix monthly packages sent to various European organisations to support the fight against Apartheid. The Gille de Vlieg photographic collection is included in the on-line South African History Archive and contains 581 black and white digital images. She is also one of two women featured in Beyond the Barricades. In 2014 she was nominated as a finalist of the Mbokodo Awards.

== Collective exhibitions ==
- 2012 – Rise and Fall of Apartheid: Photography and the Bureaucracy of Everyday Life – International Centre of Photography, New York City, NY
- 2012 – NUMSA
- 2011 – Photography 1950 – 2010 – Pretoria Art Museum, Pretoria
- 2009 – End Conscription Campaign (ECC)
- 2002 – Shooting Resistance: South African Photography 1976 – 1994 – Axis Gallery Inc., New York City, NY
- 1990 – Malibongwe – Netherlands
- 1989 – Radda Barnen – Sweden
- 1987 – Taking Sides in South America – TPW – Toronto Photographers Workshop, Toronto, ON
- 1985 – People's Portraits – South African National Gallery

== Individual shows ==
- 2012 – 'Hidden from View: Community Carers and HIV in Rural South Africa' held at the University of KwaZulu-Natal, produced in co-operation with Amnesty International
- 2009 – 'Rising Up Together' at Durban Art Gallery premiering at the National Arts Festival in Grahamstown
- 2006 – 'Rising Up' at Constitution Hill, Johannesburg, opened by former Constitutional Court judge, Kate O'Regan

== Publications ==
- Vukhani Makhozikazi (1985)
- Beyond the Barricades (1989)
- Women by Women: '50 Years of Women's Photography in South Africa' (2006)
