= Sam Turpin =

- Born: Samuel Thomas Turpin; September 2, 1995 (age 31)
- Origin: Johannesburg, South Africa
- Genres: Hip-Hop/Rap, Alternative
- Occupations: Rapper, producer
- Years active: 2013-present

Samuel Thomas Turpin (born 2 September 1995) is a South African rapper, producer and musical artist.

He is the son of South African photographer and activist Gisèle Wulfsohn.

== Biography ==
Turpin grew up in Johannesburg, South Africa where he was exposed to a variety of cultural influences, including hip hop music and hip hop culture. In 2011, his mother died from cancer and the following year Turpin began making music as an outlet to express emotion and cope with loss.

== Music career ==
In 2013, Turpin released his debut single "Cranes" which garnered enough interest for him to start performing around Johannesburg. Following in 2014, he released his debut EP "Eternal Sentiment" as a limited online release. Turpin released his second EP "Wasi-Wasi" in 2015 accompanied by some more self-produced music videos. In 2016, Sam was interviewed about the state of South African youth and society in director Lebogang Rasethaba's noted documentary "The People Versus The Rainbow Nation" which was released globally on MTV. In 2017, he released his first full-length mixtape titled "4am In Jozi", a musical ode to the night-time anxieties of central Johannesburg. The project garnered Turpin a branded showcase as well as fashion-oriented placements in the South African creative industry.

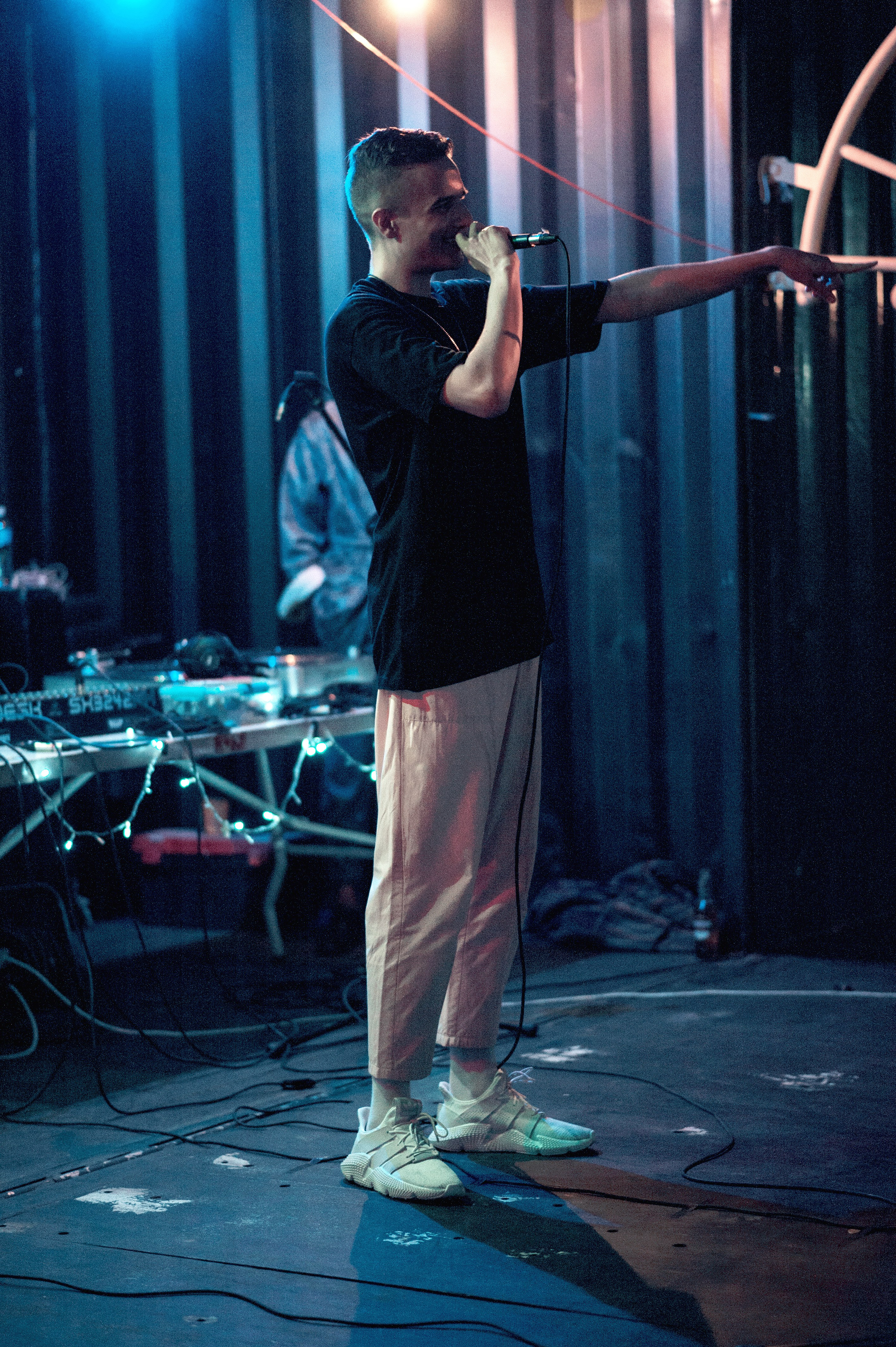
Turpin performing live in Soweto, 2019

In early 2019, Turpin released a song titled "Summer Evening" featuring London-based musician India Shan, which plays like a personal letter to his mother. According to Turpin, this was the first time he was able to express himself "directly" to his mother since she passed. This was followed by "Sahara Flow", a single drawing more from his Jewish heritage, sampling an ancient Hebrew chant, sung by South African singer Jessica Sherman. In late 2019, Turpin joined the live ensemble of The Charles Géne Suite collective and began performing at festivals, club shows and events.

In early 2020, during South Africa's COVID-19 lockdown, Turpin and collaborator Lenny-Dee Doucha released their single "Cloud City". Turpin then collaborated with film maker Katya Abedian-Rawháni to release their short musical film "Sahara Flow" which premiered via London's Nataal Magazine. In 2022, Turpin participated in the POST POST digital concert organised by Music in Africa and Tshepang Ramoba of the renowned BLK JKS and released the single "Broken Mirror", collaborating on the cover artwork with Japanese visual artist Keisuke Nakayama. Sam was then featured on The Charles Géne Suite's debut album "Suite Nites", appearing on two of the album's thirteen tracks. Sam then produced and starred in the short film and music video for “Whiskey Music”, from The Charles Géne Suite album. In November 2022, Sam travelled to Cape Town with fellow artist Laliboi to perform at the Selective Live showcase and The Lightning Bolt Festival, which was organised by House of Machines.

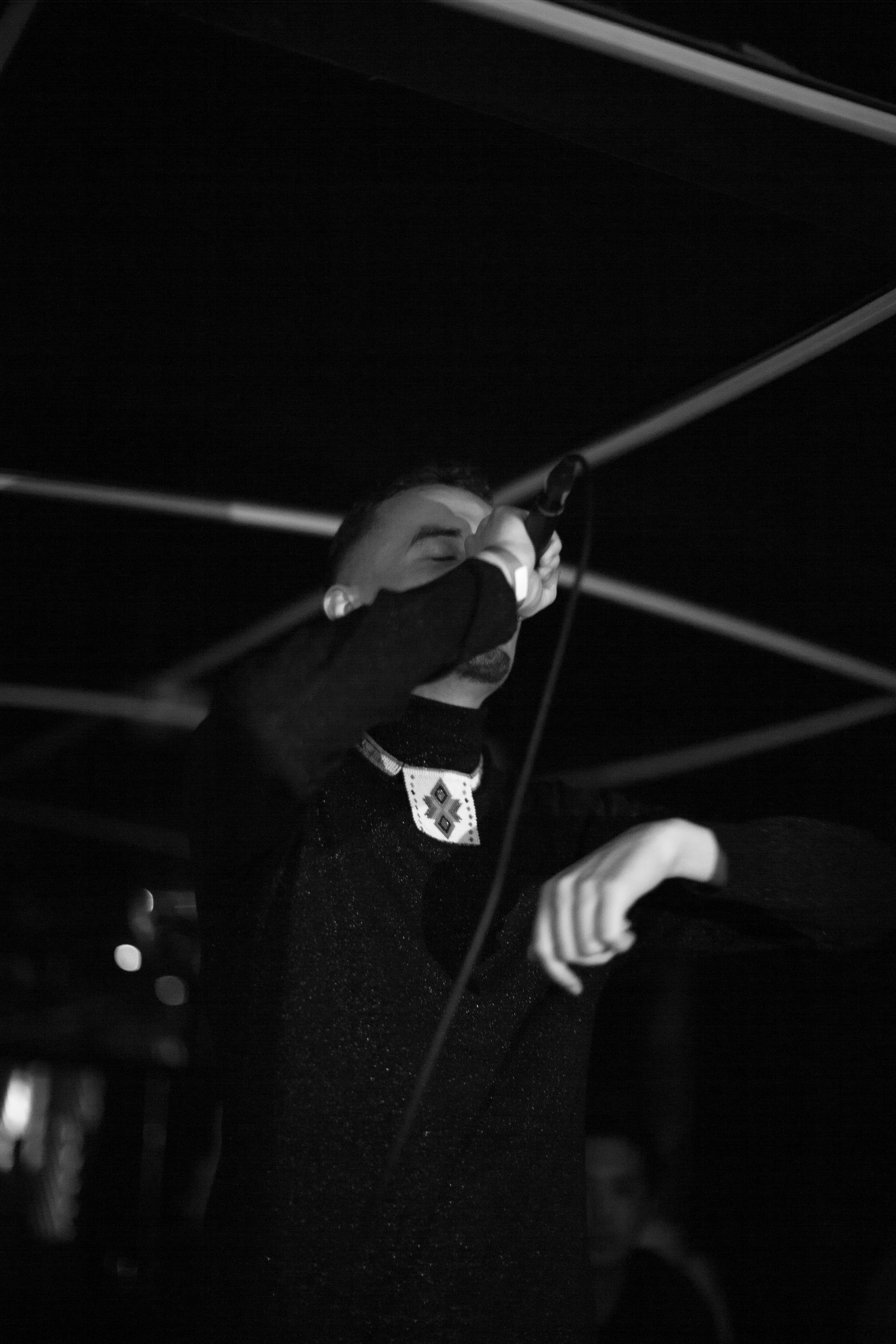
Turpin performing in Tokyo, Japan, 2024

In January 2023, the Suite Nites album featuring Sam was released in Japan as a deluxe physical edition through Paraphernalia Records and Disk Union. Sam subsequently released his third EP "Syncope" along with his self-directed visuals for the single "Moon Light" which featured Laliboi, The Charles Géne Suite and Jenny Dison. In October 2024 Sam travelled to Tokyo, Japan to perform at the Tour du Monde Event party organised by NO VISA. In early 2025 Sam re-released his track "War Neva End" with the late Bacardi House pioneer DJ Spoko as a 10-year-anniversary edition across all official music platforms. In April 2025, Sam announced the debut Cold Chinese Food album with the lead single and music video "Ethiopian Coffee". The full-length album "Vital Ital" was released in July 2025. In April 2026, Sam performed his solo work at the relaunched Sofar Sounds event in Johannesburg. In October of the same year, Sam returned to Tokyo, Japan and performed at Bonobo Jingumae.

== Personal life and education ==
In 2017, Turpin received a Bachelor of Arts from the University of the Witwatersrand in Anthropology and History. He later pursued a program in music production and sound engineering.

Turpin is fluent in English, isiZulu and also knows some basic French and Japanese.

== Discography ==
=== Extended plays ===
- Eternal Sentiment (2014)
- Wasi-Wasi (2015)
- Syncope (2023)

==== with ILLA N ====
- Cold Chinese Food (2014)

=== Mixtapes ===
- 4am In Jozi (2017)

=== Albums ===
==== with The Charles Géne Suite ====
- Suite Nites (2022)
- Cold Chinese Food - Vital Ital (2025)

==== as Cold Chinese Food ====
- Vital Ital (2025)
