= Billy Monk =

South African photographer

William John Monk (died 31 July 1982) was a South African, known for his photographs of a Cape Town nightclub between 1967 and 1969, during apartheid. In 2012 a posthumous book was published, Billy Monk: Nightclub Photographs.

== Early life ==
Not much is known about the early life of Monk. Although he was born on January 11 it was never sure what year, and no one knew his exact age. He didn't like to speak about his childhood. His father was an alcoholic. His early occupations consisted of surviving in any manner he could, largely through petty crime. He was sent to jail for two years as a teenager for stealing a safe, and there learned to become a receptionist. He then moved on to smuggling—be it across the Transkei or poaching fish off the coast of Cape Town. Throughout his life he held a variety of jobs—a Woolworths model, a photographer's assistant, a diamond diver, a sandal shop owner, the proprietor of a vegetarian restaurant, and finally, a bouncer and photographer.

== Photography ==
When Monk's work as a bouncer did not work out he took up photography. Still working in The Catacombs, he began to make his living taking pictures of the diverse clientele in a seedy bar. He used a Pentax camera, with a 35 mm focal-length lens, a small flash and Ilford FP4 film. Monk stopped taking pictures in 1969. His photographs show a variety of the underbelly of Cape Town life at the time—ranging from old men with young wives and gay couples, to midgets and mixed race relationships, he shows a side of life under apartheid that is rarely seen elsewhere.

=== Discovery of his work ===
Monk's work was discovered in 1979 by Jac de Villiers, when he moved into Monk's old studio. Not only were they already well constructed by the photographer, they were also impeccably annotated with dates and names, which made curation a simple and enjoyable process. The first exhibition of Monk's work took place at the Market Gallery in Johannesburg in 1982—and although Monk could not attend the event it was subject to much critical acclaim.

=== Apartheid ===
Monk was working during apartheid in South Africa—a time when the colour of your skin was indicative of where you could live, work, who you could marry, and where you could drink. The underground lifestyle of The Catacombs allowed for dissent. Monk chose to take pictures originally as a way of making money, by selling them to his clients.

His photographs reveal a variety of clientele. Some are sloppy, some are neat and put together. Many of the women are heavily made up with short dresses, and almost all the photographs are highly sexually charged. The photographs reveal much of what was not allowed under apartheid rule—specifically a variety of same sex and mixed race couples.

== Death ==
Monk was never to witness the exhibition of his own work in a gallery. No more than two weeks after the exhibition began he attempted to get a ride from Cape Town to Johannesburg to see his work—however in the process he became involved in an altercation during which a man pulled a gun. Monk was shot in the chest, and died on the evening of Saturday 31 July 1982. His last words were said to be “Now you’ve gone and killed me.” He was buried at sea by his remaining family—three sisters, his wife, Jeanette, his son and daughter and former frequenters of The Catacombs.

== Exhibitions ==
=== Solo exhibitions ===
- Market Gallery, Johannesburg, 1982

=== Group exhibitions ===
- From the Bridge to the Catacombs Club: Photographs by Billy Monk and David Wise, Iziko South African National Gallery, Cape Town, South Africa, 1993.
- David Goldblatt, Ernest Cole, and Billy Monk's South Africa in Apartheid and After, San Francisco Museum of Modern Art, San Francisco, CA, 2012–2013. With David Goldblatt and Ernest Cole.
- Rise and Fall of Apartheid, International Center of Photography, New York, 2012.

== Posthumous publications ==
=== Publications by Monk ===
- Billy Monk: Nightclub Photographs. Stockport, Cheshire: Dewi Lewis, 2012. ISBN 978-1-907893-18-6. With a foreword by David Goldblatt.

=== Publications with contributions by Monk ===
- Anthology of African and Indian Ocean Photography. Revue Noire, 1999. Edited by Jean Loup Pivin and Pascal Martin Saint Leon. English ISBN 2-909571-491; French ISBN 2-909571-300; Portuguese ISBN 2-909571-432.

== Posthumous awards ==
- Billy Monk was one of three shortlisted for the Kraszna-Krausz Book Awards, UK, 2013

== Collections ==
Monk's work is held in the following permanent collections:

- Johannesburg Art Gallery, Johannesburg, South Africa
- San Francisco Museum of Modern Art, San Francisco, California
