= Afrapix =

Afrapix was a collective agency of amateur and professional photographers who opposed Apartheid in South Africa and documented South Africa in the 1980s. The group was established in 1982 and dissolved itself in 1991. According to South African researcher and visual historian Kylie Thomas, Afrapix "can be understood as one of the most important schools of South African photography in two senses. The collective provided a way for emerging photographers to develop their craft and to gain from the experience of other more established photographers. Afrapix was also an organisation with a particular ethos and approach, and in large measure its coherence was derived from the unifying force of the collective’s opposition to apartheid. Like the banners emblazoned with the slogan of the United Democratic Front that appear in images by many Afrapix photographers, “UDF Unites, Apartheid Divides”, Afrapix brought together a diverse group of South Africans committed to a form of documentary activism."

== About Afrapix ==
Afrapix was independently funded by its members, who were both black and white. The group received both national and international feedback, as their photographs were used across the world. Oxfam used photographs by a number of Afrapix members to illustrate their 1990 publication 'We Cry for our Land: Farmworkers in South Africa', and some Afrapix pictures were also used in Oxfam's 'Front Line Africa: The Right to a Future' (1990). Afrapix members photographed their own projects and also conducted workshops in black communities that focused on photography and literacy through artwork. Afrapix members shared their technical knowledge while mentoring individuals in these areas.

As the period was known as the "struggle years," the photographs and projects produced through Afrapix were labelled as "struggle photography." Many of the photographers considered themselves political activists or had a political agenda, and worked to raise awareness about the evils of apartheid. The various artists of Afrapix agreed that they were a team working against apartheid, but that their inspirations came from different places.

Many of the images were of rallies or protests, instances of police brutality, and impoverished areas. Kylie Thomas suggests that the history of social documentary photography in the Afrapix period is probably more complex and heterogenous than often suggested, especially when analysing the work of women photographers such as Gille De Vlieg and Gisèle Wulfsohn.

A detailed timeline of Afrapix is accessible at the SA History Online website.

== Principles and Objectives ==
Paul Weinberg, one of the co-founders of Afrapix, said that Afrapix aimed to be "an agency and a picture library and to stimulate documentary photography" (see 'Art and the End of Apartheid', Peffer, 2009, p. 254) and also set this in the context of the day:

photography can't be divorced from the political, social issues that surround us daily. As photographers we are inextricably caught up in those processes-we are not objective instruments but play a part in the way we choose to make our statements.

== Members ==
Joseph Alfers, Peter Auf de Hyder, Omar Badsha, Steve Hilton Barber, Gille de Vlieg, Graham Goddard, Dave Hartman, Lesley Lawson, Chris Ledochowski, John Liebenberg, Herbert Mabuza, Humphrey Phakade "Pax" Magwaza, Kentridge Matabatha, Rafique Mayet, Mxolise Mayo, Vuyi Lesley Mbalo, Peter McKenzie, Roger Meintjies, Eric Miller, Santu Mofokeng, Deseni Moodliar, Cedric Nunn, Billy Paddock, Biddy Partridge, Myron Peters, Jeeva Rajgopaul, Wendy Schwegmann, Cecil Sols, Guy Tillim, Zubeida Vallie, Paul Weinberg, Gisèle Wulfsohn, Anna Zieminski

== Conflicts ==
The photographers put themselves at risk each time they worked, given that authority figures might beat or even shoot them.

While working in townships, their works were confiscated at times. The facilities of some Afrapix members were pillaged. Surveillance by Security Police made situations difficult. Photographers could also be detained extralegally.

Since there was no single person or persons in charge of Afrapix, there were contrasts of perspectives and ideas amongst the members. Due to this, disagreements occurred and the eventual split between the more political side and the individual documentary side, which would later be called Southlight.

There were also many criticisms of the Afrapix movement. It was viewed negatively by some who thought the group only showed black Africans as powerless. Various Afrapix photographers themselves said they felt pressured to fulfill stereotypes through their images.

== The Afrapix Consolidation Project ==
In 2019 a project was initiated by Paul Weinberg, one of the founders of Afrapix, to identify photographs made by members of Afrapix as well as related posters and publications, to digitise this material, and to make it accessible for research. Weinberg worked with researcher Kylie Thomas and archivists at the University of the Witwatersrand in Johannesburg to locate, digitise and curate the materials. The Afrapix collection can be accessed through the Wits University Research Archives.

== Projects ==
- Omar Badsha, ed. South Africa: The cordoned heart: Essays. Cape Town: Gallery Press; New York: Norton, 1986. ISBN 0620091258. (Note: Four photographs from this are shown here.)
- Omar Badsha et al, eds. Beyond the barricades: Popular resistance in South Africa: Photographs by twenty South African photographers. New York: Aperture, 1989. ISBN 0-89381-375-3.
- Victor Levie, ed. De Verborgen camera: Zuidafrikaanse fotografie aan de censuur ontkomen = Hidden Camera: South African Photography Escaped from Censorship. Amsterdam: Stichting CASA, 1989. ISBN 9035107411.
- Wendy Davies, We Cry for our Land: Farmworkers in South Africa. Oxfam 1990. ISBN 0-85598-143-1
- Susannah Smith, Front Line Africa: The Right to a Future. Oxfam 1990. ISBN 0-85598-103-2
