= Phumzile Khanyile =

South African photographer (born 1991)

- Born: 1991 (age 34–35); Tladi, Soweto, South Africa
- Occupation: Photographer

Phumzile Khanyile (born 1991) is a South African photographer, living in Johannesburg. Her series Plastic Crowns is about women's lives and sexual politics. The series has been shown in group exhibitions at the Palace of the Dukes of Cadaval in Evora, Portugal; Iziko South African National Gallery in Cape Town; and the National Gallery of Victoria in Melbourne, Australia; and was a winner of the CAP Prize for Contemporary African Photography.

== Early life and education ==
Khanyile was born in Tladi, Soweto, South Africa. She studied photography at the Market Photo Workshop from 2013.

== Life and work ==
Plastic Crowns is a series of self-portraits while dressed in her grandmother's clothes, with whom she lives. The series is concerned with the female experience of relations between the sexes, in terms of power. It is "an exploration of shame, and an unpacking of the expectations Khanyile inherited from her grandmother about what it means to be a woman"—"stereotypical ideas of gender, sexual preference and related stigmas and their relevance in contemporary society". It employs a snapshot aesthetic, "as if they're from a private journal", "raw and out-of-focus [. . . ] as much from the family album snapshot as the rough urban glamour of postwar Japanese photography". Plastic Crowns came about through Khanyile spending a lot of time indoors, having been too "scared to leave her house since she was attacked on the streets."

Khanyile and Nkosinathi Khumalo direct the Johannesburg project space Zulu Republik.

== Publications ==
=== Publications by Khanyile ===
- Plastic Crowns. Johannesburg: Market Photo Workshop.

=== Publications with contributions by Khanyile ===
- Afrotopia. Paris: Dilecta, 2017. Ministère de la Culture du Mali; Institut Français. With texts by Marie-Ann Yemsi, Felwine Sarr, Thulie Gamedze, Cédric Aurelle. ISBN 978-2373720495. Published on the occasion of African Photography Encounters, Bamako, Mali, 2017/2018.
- Paris Nude. By Mary McCartney. London: HENI, 2019. ISBN 9781912122257.
- Africa State of Mind: Contemporary Photography Reimagines a Continent. London: Thames & Hudson, 2020. ISBN 978-0500545164.

== Exhibitions ==
=== Solo exhibitions ===
- Plastic Crowns, Market Photo Workshop, Johannesburg, South Africa, 2017

=== Group exhibitions ===
- African Passions, Palace of the Dukes of Cadaval, Evora Africa (African art and music festival), Evora, Portugal, 2018. Curated by André Magnin and Philippe Boutté. Included work from Plastic Crowns.
- Not the Usual Suspects, Iziko South African National Gallery, Cape Town, South Africa, 2018/2019. A tribute to the Market Photo Workshop. Included work from Plastic Crowns.
- NGV Triennial, National Gallery of Victoria, Melbourne, Australia, 2020/2021. Included work from Plastic Crowns.

== Awards ==
- 2015: Gisèle Wulfsohn Mentorship in Photography, from the Market Photo Workshop and the family and friends of Wulfsohn. Mentorship with Ayana V. Jackson.
- 2018: 1 of 5 winners, CAP Prize for Contemporary African Photography, for Plastic Crowns
