= David Goldblatt =

South African photographer (1930–2018)

David Goldblatt HonFRPS
- Born: 29 November 1930; Randfontein, South Africa
- Died: 25 June 2018 (aged 87); Johannesburg, South Africa
- Occupation: Photographer
- Years active: 1948–2018
- Notable work: On the Mines (1973), Some Afrikaners Photographed, (1975) The Structure of Things Then (1998)

David Goldblatt HonFRPS (29 November 1930 – 25 June 2018) was a South African documentary photographer noted for his dedicated portrayal of the South African peoples within the political landscape of the apartheid era. After apartheid's end, he concentrated more on the country's landscapes. Goldblatt's body of work was distinct from that of other anti-apartheid artists in that he photographed issues that went beyond the violent events of apartheid and reflected the conditions that led up to them. His forms of protest have a subtlety that traditional documentary photographs may lack; Goldblatt said, "[M]y dispassion was an attitude in which I tried to avoid easy judgments.... This resulted in a photography that appeared to be disengaged and apolitical, but which was in fact the opposite." Goldblatt also wrote journal articles and books on aesthetics, architecture, and structural analysis.

== Early life ==
Goldblatt was born in Randfontein, Gauteng Province, and was the youngest of the three sons of Eli and Olga Goldblatt. His grandparents arrived in South Africa from Lithuania around 1893, having fled the persecution of Jews there.

Goldblatt's father ran a clothing store, where his mother worked as a typist for a clothing company, which Goldblatt speculated may have been how they met. Goldblatt attended Krugersdorp High School, and graduated from the University of the Witwatersrand with a degree in commerce.

== Photography ==
Goldblatt began photographing as a teenager. He received his first camera from his father, who had bought it from his other son, who had brought home the damaged German Contax on his return from serving in World War II. Goldblatt enlisted help from a wedding photographer: "He would drape several cameras around my neck so that I looked very professional, and my job was to ensure that no guest with a good camera got a good picture . . . I would have to bump or walk in front of them at the critical moment so that my boss was the only person who ended up with good photographs." A couple years later in 1963, as his skill developed, he sold the clothing shop that he had taken over on the death of his father in 1962, and became a full-time photographer. He documented developments in South Africa through the period of apartheid until it ended in the early 1990s, and long after, even until his death in 2018.

Throughout his years as a photographer, Goldblatt never saw himself as an artist, and he was uncomfortable being seen as one. Many agree that he was a documentarian more than he was an artist. Goldblatt had an innovative approach to documentary photography. He made a life of photographing the issues that went beyond the events of apartheid and documented the conditions that led to them. Goldblatt was never comfortable with the fine art world. He went to exhibition openings but secretly hated the attention they threw upon him. He got around the label of artist by simply calling himself a photographer. He said: "I am a self-appointed observer and critic of the society into which I was born, with a tendency to giving recognition to what is overlooked or unseen."

Goldblatt's photography was not obviously politically charged. He claimed he was not an activist, unlike the majority of his friends and other photographers during this time. He in turn was looked down upon and disrespected for not involving himself in activism, on which he commented: "I wasn't prepared to compromise what I regarded as my particular needs." Instead of producing photographs which might "attempt to pass judgment," Goldblatt chose to "show the complexity of a situation."

Depictions of the everyday are frequent in Goldblatt's work. Instead of photographing the explicit violence of Apartheid South Africa, he preferred to document the violence of this era which exhibited itself in ordinary life: "I shun violence. And I wouldn't know how to handle it if I was a photographer in a violent scene."

During Apartheid, Goldblatt in his work The Transported of KwaNdebele documented the excruciatingly long and uncomfortable twice-daily bus journeys of black workers who lived in the segregated "homelands" northeast of Pretoria. The conditions had not changed that much for workers by 2007: "The bulk of people who live there still have to travel to Pretoria by road. It's still a very long commute for them every day – two to eight hours. . . . It will take generations to undo the consequences of Apartheid."

In the 1970s, Goldblatt documented one of the many injustices of the Apartheid South African government in a series of photographs of houses, shops and other types of architecture in the Johannesburg suburb, Pageview. The Group Areas Act of 1950 displaced much of the local population in favor of white South Africans. Goldblatt documented the local population's demonstrations of resistance and determination through their persistent occupation of their homes and businesses—regardless of the damage done.

After apartheid, Goldblatt continued to photograph within South Africa, particularly its landscapes.

In the work Goldblatt created during apartheid he never photographed in colour. Goldblatt observed that: "the use of colour during apartheid would have been inappropriate. It would have enhanced the beautiful and the personal, whereas black and white photographs to more effectively documented the external dramatic contradictions that defined this earlier period." In the 1990s he began working in colour, in a sense adapting to the digital age. "I've found the venture into color quite exciting . . . largely because new technology has enabled me to work with color on the computer as I have done with black and white in the darkroom." It was only after working on a project involving blue asbestos in north-western Australia, and "the resulting disease and death", that he "got hooked on doing work in color [because] You can't make it blue in black and white."

This was coupled with new developments in digital scanning and printing. Only when Goldblatt was able to achieve the same "depth" in his colour work that he had previously achieved in his black and white photography did he choose to explore this extensively.

== Collections and publications ==
Goldblatt's work is held in major museum collections worldwide including the Museum of Modern Art.

Interest in Goldblatt's work increased significantly after a travelling exhibition of 51 years of his work (Barcelona, 2001), and the eleventh Documenta (Kassel, 2002). The former, which opened in the AXA Gallery in New York in 2001, offered an overview of Goldblatt's photographic oeuvre from 1948 to 1999. At Documenta, two projects were shown: black-and-white work depicting life in the middle-class white community of Boksburg in the 1970s and 1980s, as well as examples of later colour work from the series Johannesburg Intersections.

Goldblatt's book South Africa: The Structure of Things Then, published in 1998, offers an in-depth visual analysis of the relationship between South Africa's structures and the forces that shaped them, from the country's early colonial beginnings up until 1990.

Goldblatt has written extensively on architecture and the deeper meaning contained within the buildings we occupy.

== Influences ==
Goldblatt was inspired by photography in magazines such as Life, Look and Picture Post, which helped him with things such as captioning his photographs. Goldblatt also cited writers and visual artists as his major influences, among them Jillian Becker, Guy Tillim, Herman Charles Bosman, Nadine Gordimer, Njabulo Ndebele, Ivan Vladislavic and playwright Barney Simon.

Herman Charles Bosman specifically helped inspire Goldblatt in his second photo essay titled The South African Tatler.

Goldblatt helped influence the work of the photographer Santu Mofokeng as they studied together during the time of apartheid. Together they helped reinvent documentary and conceptual modes of photography, which led them to prominence and influence within documentary photography.

== Later life ==
Following the establishment of the Market Photo Workshop in Johannesburg in 1989, David Goldblatt was known for his inclusive approach to photography education. He welcomed photographers of all backgrounds and remained accessible to both emerging and established practitioners throughout his career, including in his later years.

Goldblatt died on 25 June 2018 in Johannesburg from cancer. He had created photographs up until his death. He was survived by his wife, Lily Goldblatt, children Steven, Brenda, and Ronnie, and two grandchildren.

== Publications ==
- On the Mines. With Nadine Gordimer. Cape Town: C Struik, 1973. ISBN 0-86977-029-2. (in English)
- On the Mines. Göttingen: Steidl, 2012. ISBN 978-3-86930-491-5. Revised and enlarged edition.
- Some Afrikaners Photographed. Johannesburg: Murray Crawford, 1975. (in English)
- Cape Dutch Homesteads. With Margaret Courtney-Clark and John Kench. Cape Town: C Struik, 1981. ISBN 0-86977-140-X. (in English)
- In Boksburg. Cape Town: The Gallery Press, 1982. ISBN 0-620-05933-8. (in English)
- David Goldblatt: Thirty-five years of photographs, April 1983 to January 1984 / Vyf-en-dertig jaar se foto's, April 1983 tot Januarie 1984. Cape Town: South African National Gallery, 1983. Small exhibition catalogue. (in Afrikaans and English)
- Lifetimes: Under Apartheid. With Nadine Gordimer. New York: Alfred A Knopf, 1986. ISBN 0-394-55406-X. London: Cape, 1986. ISBN 0-224-02870-7. (in English)
- South Africa. London: The Photographers' Gallery, 1986. ISBN 0-907879-07-1. Small exhibition catalogue. (in English)
- The Transported of KwaNdebele: A South African Odyssey. With Brenda Goldblatt and Phillip van Niekerk. New York: Aperture Books, 1989. ISBN 0-89381-366-4, ISBN 0-89381-385-0. (in English)
- South Africa: The Structure of Things Then. Cape Town: Oxford University Press 1998. ISBN 0-19-571631-0. New York: Monacelli, 1998. ISBN 1-58093-026-3. With an essay by Neville Dubow. (in English)
- David Goldblatt. Phaidon 55. London: Phaidon, 2001. ISBN 0-7148-4051-3. With text by Lesley Lawson. (in English)
- David Goldblatt Fifty-One Years. Barcelona: Museu d'Art Contemporani de Barcelona, 2001. ISBN 84-95273-78-0. (in English)
- Particulars. Johannesburg: Goodman Gallery, 2003. ISBN 0-620-30659-9. ("Prix du Livre ", XVIe Rencontres Internationales de la Photographie Arles 2004)
- David Goldblatt – Intersections. Munich: Prestel, 2005. ISBN 3-7913-3247-3.
- David Goldblatt – Photographs. Rome: Contrasto, 2006. ISBN 88-6965-015-4.
- David Goldblatt – Some Afrikaners Revisited. With Antjie Krog and Ivor Powell. Cape Town: Umuzi, 2007. ISBN 1-4152-0025-4 (paper), ISBN 1-4152-0026-2 (hard). Revised and augmented edition of Some Afrikaners Photographed (1975).
- David Goldblatt: Photographs: Hasselblad Award 2006. Ostfildern: Hatje Cantz; Gothenburg: Hasselblad Foundation, 2006. ISBN 3-7757-1917-2.
- David Goldblatt: Südafrikanische Fotografien 1952–2006. Winterthur: Christoph Merian Verlag, 2007. ISBN 3-85616-294-1. (in German)
- Intersections Intersected. Porto: Civilização Editoria; Fundação Serralves, 2008. ISBN 972-739-201-6. With text by Ulrich Loock and Ivor Powell. (in English)
- Intersecções intersectadas. Porto: Civilização Editoria; Fundação Serralves, 2008. ISBN 972-739-200-8, ISBN 972-26-2765-1. With text by Ulrich Loock and Ivor Powell. (in Portuguese)
- In Boksburg. Books on Books 7. New York: Errata Editions, 2010. ISBN 1-935004-12-3. (in English) A reduced-size facsimile of the 1982 book, with an essay by Joanna Lehan.
- Kith Kin & Khaya: South African Photographs. Johannesburg: Goodman Gallery, 2010. ISBN 0-9869749-0-0, ISBN 0-9869749-1-9. (in English) Catalogue of the exhibition at the Jewish Museum, New York, 2010, and at the South African Jewish Museum, Cape Town, 2010–2011.
- TJ / Double Negative: Johannesburg Photographs 1948–2010. Cape Town: Umuzi, 2010. ISBN 1-4152-0128-5. Contrasto Due, 2011. ISBN 88-6965-218-1. (in English) Two books in a box: TJ is a book of photographs by Goldblatt, Double Negative a novel by Ivan Vladislavić. (Best Photography Book, Kraszna-Krausz Foundation Book Awards 2011)
- TJ / Johannesburg fotografie 1948–2010 / Doppia negazione. With Ivan Vladislavic. Contrasto, 2010. ISBN 978-88-6965-262-2. (in Italian)
- TJ. Arles: Actes Sud, 2011. ISBN 88-6965-271-8. (in French)
- David Goldblatt, Photographers' References, 2014. ISBN 978-2-9543839-1-0 (in English). An in depth interview led by Baptiste Lignel.
- Regarding Intersections. Göttingen: Steidl, 2014. ISBN 978-3-86930-714-5. With an essay by Michael Stevenson and an interview by Mark Haworth-Booth. Colour photographs in South Africa made between 2002 and 2011.
- Structures of Dominion and Democracy. Göttingen: Steidl, 2018. Edited by Karolina Ziebinska-Lewandowska. ISBN 978-3-95829-391-5. A selective retrospective.
- No Ulterior Motive Yale University Press, 2024. ISBN 978-0-300273-41-0.
- Fragments of Fietas. Mackbooks, 2025. ISBN 978-1-917651-08-0.

== Exhibitions ==
=== Solo exhibitions ===
- David Goldblatt. Photographers' Gallery, London, 1974.
- David Goldblatt. National Gallery of Victoria, Melbourne, 1975.
- Photography Place, Sydney, 1975.
- David Goldblatt. Durban Art Gallery, Durban, South Africa, 1977.
- David Goldblatt. Market Theatre galleries, Johannesburg, 1978.
- Johannesburg Art Gallery, 1983.
- Pretoria Art Gallery, Pretoria, 1983.
- David Goldblatt. South African National Gallery, Cape Town, 1983.
- David Goldblatt. Side Gallery, Newcastle upon Tyne, 1985.
- David Goldblatt. Photographers' Gallery, London, 1986.
- Photographs from South Africa. Museum of Modern Art, New York, 1998.
- David Goldblatt. Netherlands Architecture Institute, Rotterdam, 1998.
- David Goldblatt. South African National Gallery, Cape Town, 1999.
- Structures. Johannesburg Art Gallery, to November 1999.
- In Boksburg. Krings-Ernst Galerie, Cologne, October 2001 – January 2002.
- Fifty-One Years, Axa Gallery, New York, 2001; Centro Cultural de Belém, Belém, Lisbon, 2002–2003; Johannesburg Art Gallery, 2005; MACBA, Barcelona (organiser), February–May 2002; Witte de With, Rotterdam, 2002; Modern Art Oxford, Oxford, February–March 2003; Palais des Beaux-Arts, Brussels, April–June 2003; Lenbachhaus, Munich, July–November 2003; Bensusan Museum and Library of Photography, Johannesburg, July–November 2004.
- Krings-Ernst Galerie, Cologne, 2002.
- Mostly unseen. Goodman Gallery, Johannesburg, 2002.
- Intersections. Michael Stevenson Gallery, Cape Town, October 2003; Michael Stevenson Gallery, Johannesburg, 2005. museum kunst palast, Düsseldorf, June–August 2005; Camera Austria, Graz, November 2005 – February 2006. Huis Marseille, Amsterdam, March–May 2007; Berkeley Art Museum, July–August 2007.
- Asbestos. Michael Stevenson Gallery, Cape Town, October 2003.
- Particulars & Rural South Africa. Goodman Gallery, Johannesburg, October–November 2003.
- Galerie Marian Goodman, Paris, 2004.
- David Goldblatt. Galerie des Franciscains, Le Grand Café, Centre d'art contemporain, Saint-Nazaire, November–December 2004.
- David Goldblatt. Galería Elba Benítez, Madrid, May–July 2005.
- David Goldblatt. Goodman Gallery, Johannesburg, 2005.
- Rencontres d'Arles, Eglise Sainte-Anne, Arles, 2006.
- Some Afrikaners Revisited. Michael Stevenson Gallery, Cape Town, October–November 2006.
- Hasselblad Award Winner 2006. Hasselblad Center, Gothenburg, November 2006 – January 2007.
- Hasselblad Award 2006. Fotografins Hus, Stockholm, February–March 2007.
- Photographs. Forma, Centro Internazionale di Fotografia, Milan, June–August 2007.
- Südafrikanische Fotografien 1952–2006. Fotomuseum Winterthur, Winterthur, March–May 2007.
- Selected works. Marian Goodman Gallery, Paris, May–June 2007. Showing the series Particulars
- Winner of Hasselblad Award 2006. Brandts Museet for Fotokunst, Odense, September–November 2007.
- David Goldblatt – Photographs of the last decade. Michael Stevenson Gallery, Cape Town, 2008.
- David Goldblatt. Galerie Paul Andriesse, Amsterdam, October–December 2008.
- David Goldblatt. Museu de Arte Contemporânea (Serralves Foundation), Porto, 2008.
- Joburg. Goodman Gallery, Johannesburg, 2008.
- David Goldblatt. Västeras Konstmuseum, Västerås, 2008.
- Intersections Intersected. Michael Stevenson Gallery, Cape Town, 2008; Open Eye Gallery, Liverpool, December 2008 – February 2009; New Museum of Contemporary Art, New York City, July–October 2009; Malmö Konsthall, Malmö, February–May 2009; University Museum of Contemporary Art, University of Massachusetts Amherst, 2011.
- Fietas. Goodman Gallery, Johannesburg, 2009.
- In the time of AIDS. Galería Elba Benítez, Madrid, 2009.
- In Boksburg. Michael Stevenson Gallery, Cape Town, February–April 2009.
- Some Afrikaners revisited. Oliewenhuis Art Museum, Bloemfontein, 2009.
- Particulars. Howard Greenberg Gallery, New York City, April–June 2010.
- South African Photographs: David Goldblatt. Jewish Museum, New York, May–September 2010.
- Kith, Kin & Kaya. South African Jewish Museum, Cape Town, 2010.
- TJ: Some things old, some things new and some much the same. Goodman Gallery, Johannesburg, October–November 2010.
- 'TJ', 1948–2010. Henri Cartier-Bresson Foundation, Paris, January–April 2011.
- Selected works. Marian Goodman Gallery, Paris, January–February 2011.
- On the Mines. Goodman Gallery, Johannesburg, October–December 2012.
- Structures of Dominion & Democracy. Goodman Gallery, Cape Town, November–December 2014.
- New Pictures 10: David Goldblatt, Structures of Dominion and Democracy. Minneapolis Institute of Art, August 2014 – February 2015.
- David Goldblatt. Centre Pompidou, Paris, February–May 2018.
- David Goldblatt Photographs 1948 – 2018. Museum of Contemporary Art Australia, Sydney, October 2018 – March 2019.
- On The Mines.The Norval Foundation, Cape Town, February–August 2019.
- David Goldblatt | Johannesburg 1948 – 2018. Goodman Gallery, London, June–August 2020.
- David Goldblatt Strange Instrument. Pace Gallery, New York, February–March 2021.
- David Goldblatt Markers of Presence.Goodman Gallery, Cape Town, June–July 2021.

=== Group exhibitions ===
- South Africa: the Cordoned Heart, South Africa and the USA, 1986.
- Johannesburg Biennial, Johannesburg, 1995.
- Contemporary Art from South Africa, Haus der Kulturen der Welt, Berlin, 1996.
- In/Sight, African Photographers, 1940 to the Present. Guggenheim Museum, New York, 1996.
- Blank Architecture, Apartheid and After. Rotterdam and Berlin, 1998.
- Home. Art Gallery of Western Australia, Perth, 2000.
- Rhizomes of Memory, Three South African Photographers. With George Hallett and Santu Mofokeng. Henie Onstad Kunstsenter, Oslo, 2000.
- Eye-Africa, Revue Noir. Cape Town, Europe and the USA, 2000.
- The Short Century – Befreiungsbewegungen in Afrika. Villa Stuck, Munich, 2001.
- Haus der Kulturen der Welt im Martin Gropius Bau, Berlin, 2001.
- Museum of Contemporary Art, Chicago, 2001.
- P.S.1 Contemporary Art Center, New York, 2001.
- Head North. Bildmuseet, Umeå, 2001.
- documenta 11. Kassel, 2002.
- Shock. Art Gallery of Western Australia, Perth, 2002.
- Strangers: The first ICP triennial of photography and video. International Center of Photography, New York, September–November 2003.
- Citigroup Photography Prize 2004. Photographers' Gallery, London, January–March 2004. With Robert Adams, Peter Fraser and Joel Sternfeld.
- Citigroup Photography Prize 2004. museum kunst palast, Düsseldorf, May–August 2004.
- Fotografie aus Südafrika. Galerie Christine König, Vienna, May–July 2004. With Santu Mofokeng and Zwelethu Mthethwa.
- History, Memory, Society. With Henri Cartier-Bresson and Lee Friedlander. Tate Modern, London, 2004.
- Eye Spy: Photography from the Permanent Collection. Museum of Contemporary Art San Diego, San Diego, USA, September 2004 – January 2005.
- Faces in the Crowd – Picturing Modern Life from Manet to Today. Whitechapel Art Gallery, London, 2004–2005.
- Faces in the Crowd – Picturing Modern Life from Manet to Today. Museo d'Arte Contemporanea, Castello di Rivoli, Turin, 2005.
- Unsettled: 8 South African photographers. National Museum of Photography, Copenhagen, November 2004 – February 2005.
- Afrika Remix. Zeitgenössische Kunst eines Kontinents. museum kunst palast, Düsseldorf, July–November 2004.
- Africa Remix. Hayward Gallery, London, February–April 2005.
- Africa Remix: l'Art contemporain d'un continent. Centre Georges Pompidou, Paris, May–August 2005.
- Africa Remix. Mori Art Museum, Tokyo, May–August 2006.
- Africa Remix. Moderna Museet, Stockholm, October 2006 – January 2007
- documenta 12. Kassel, June–September 2007.
- South African Photography 1950–2010. Johannesburg Art Gallery, 2010.
- 29th São Paulo Biennial, São Paulo, September–December 2010. With Moshekwa Langa and Kendell Geers.
- 54th Venice Biennale, ILLUMInations, 2011.
- An exhibition of Goldblatt's photographs from the collection held by the Victoria and Albert Museum shown alongside group exhibition Figures & Fictions: Contemporary South African Photography, Victoria and Albert Museum, London, 2011.
- Appropriated Landscapes: Contemporary African Art from the Walther Collection, Neu-Ulm, Germany, 2011–2012.
- Revolution vs Revolution, Beirut Art Center, 2012.
- South Africa in Apartheid and After, San Francisco Museum of Modern Art, with Ernest Cole, Billy Monk. December 2012 – March 2013.
- Everything Was Moving: Photography from the 60s and 70s, Barbican Centre, London, September 2012 – January 2013.
- C-16, Goodman Gallery, Cape Town. December–February 2014.
- Other People's Memories, Goodman Gallery, Johannesburg. January–February 2015.
- New Revolutions: Goodman Gallery at 50, Goodman Gallery, Johannesburg. June–July 2016.
- the silences between, Goodman Gallery, Cape Town. August–September 2017.
- Narrative Means, Goodman Gallery, Johannesburg. June–July 2018.

== Awards ==
- 1987: Hallmark Fellow at the International Design Conference in Aspen (IDCA), Aspen, Colorado
- 1992: Gahan Fellow in Photography at Harvard University
- 1995: Camera Austria Award of the City of Graz for Contemporary Photography
- 2001: Honorary Doctor in Fine Arts, University of Cape Town
- 2006: Hasselblad Award – Hasselblad Foundation International Award in Photography
- 2007: Honorary Doctor of Literature, University of the Witwatersrand
- 2007: Honorary Fellowship of The Royal Photographic Society
- 2009: HCB Award, Henri Cartier-Bresson Foundation
- 2010: Lucie Award, Lifetime Achievement Award, Lucie Foundation
- 2011: Order of Ikhamanga (Silver) (awarded, but declined by Goldblatt in protest over the Protection of State Information Bill)
- 2011: Honorary Doctor of Fine Arts San Francisco Art Institute
- 2013: Infinity Award: Cornell Capa Award for Lifetime Achievement, International Center of Photography, New York City

== Collections ==
Goldblatt's work is held in the following permanent public collections:

- Durban Art Gallery
- Johannesburg Art Gallery
- University of the Witwatersrand, Johannesburg
- South African National Gallery, Cape Town
- University of South Africa, Pretoria
- Constitutional Court, Braamfontein, Johannesburg
- Art Institute of Chicago, Chicago, IL
- Museum Kunstpalast, Düsseldorf
- Victoria and Albert Museum, London
- Bibliothèque nationale de France, Paris
- Fonds national d'art contemporain, Paris
- Barcelona Museum of Contemporary Art, Barcelona
- Photographers' Gallery, London
- National Museum of Photography, Copenhagen
- National Gallery of Victoria, Melbourne
- Museum of Modern Art, New York
- San Francisco Museum of Modern Art, San Francisco
- Museum of Contemporary Art San Diego, San Diego
- Getty Center, Los Angeles
- Yale University Art Gallery, New Haven, Connecticut
