= Puppets Against AIDS =

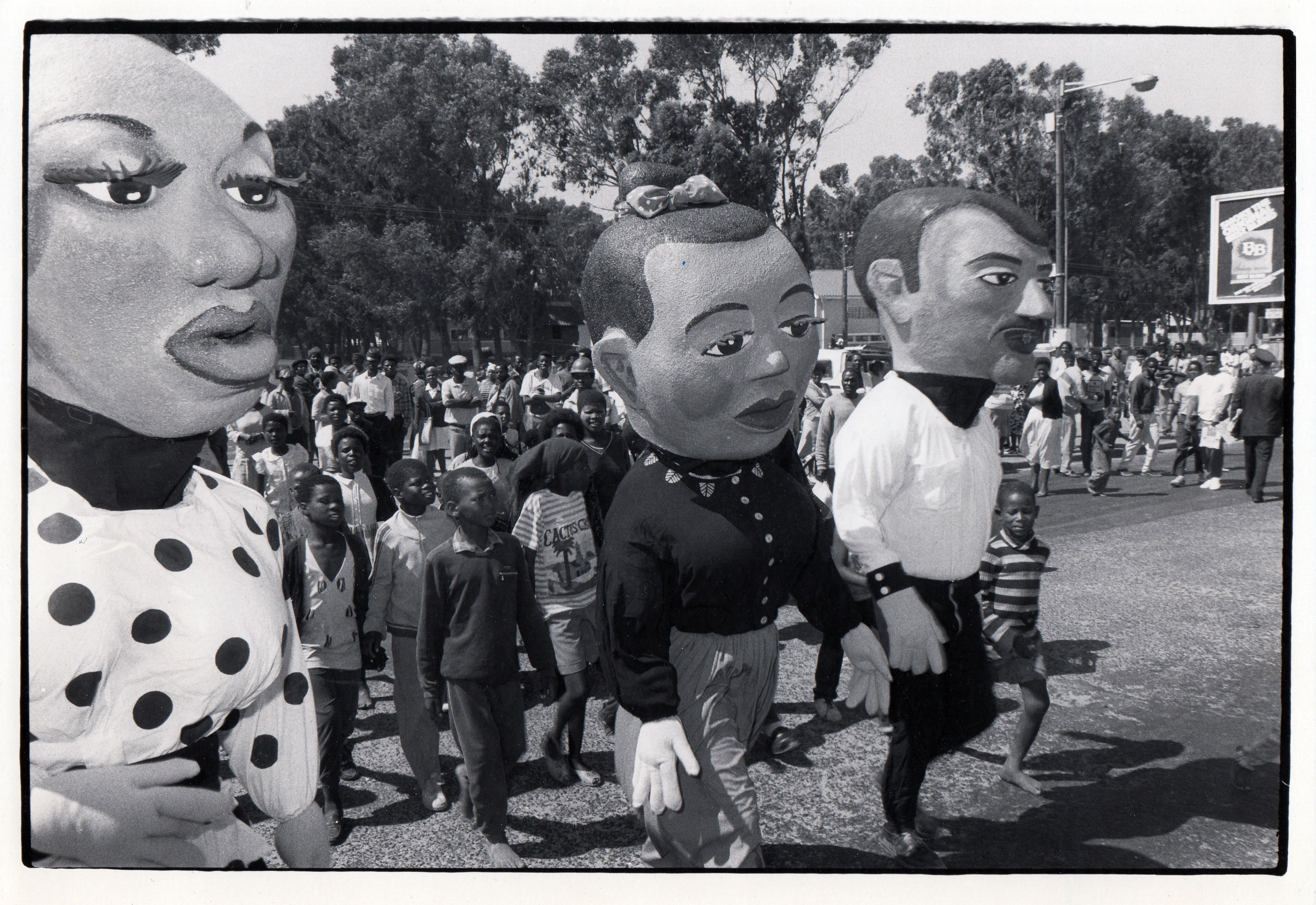
1980s, South Africa. Children following puppets performed by Puppets Against AIDS.

In the late 1980s, the African Research and Educational Puppetry Program (AREPP) founded "Puppets Against AIDS", a traveling puppet show that visited African villages and cities to encourage audience members to use condoms to prevent HIV/AIDS transmission.

== AREPP ==
The African Research and Educational Puppetry Program (AREPP) was launched in 1987 in South Africa as a community trust to research indigenous puppetry and mask performances for the purpose of supplementing social and health education with puppet shows and theater promoting life skills and self-efficacy in underserved areas. AREPP used puppets to teach "basic AIDS education" in the absence of a concerted government effort during the apartheid era.

The founders of AREPP included Gary Friedman, Maishe Maponga, Ann Wanless and Oupa Mtimkulu.

AREPP later became known as AREPP Theater for Life Trust, shifting its focus to schools in poverty-stricken areas characterized by a high prevalence of HIV infection, sexual abuse and child head of households.

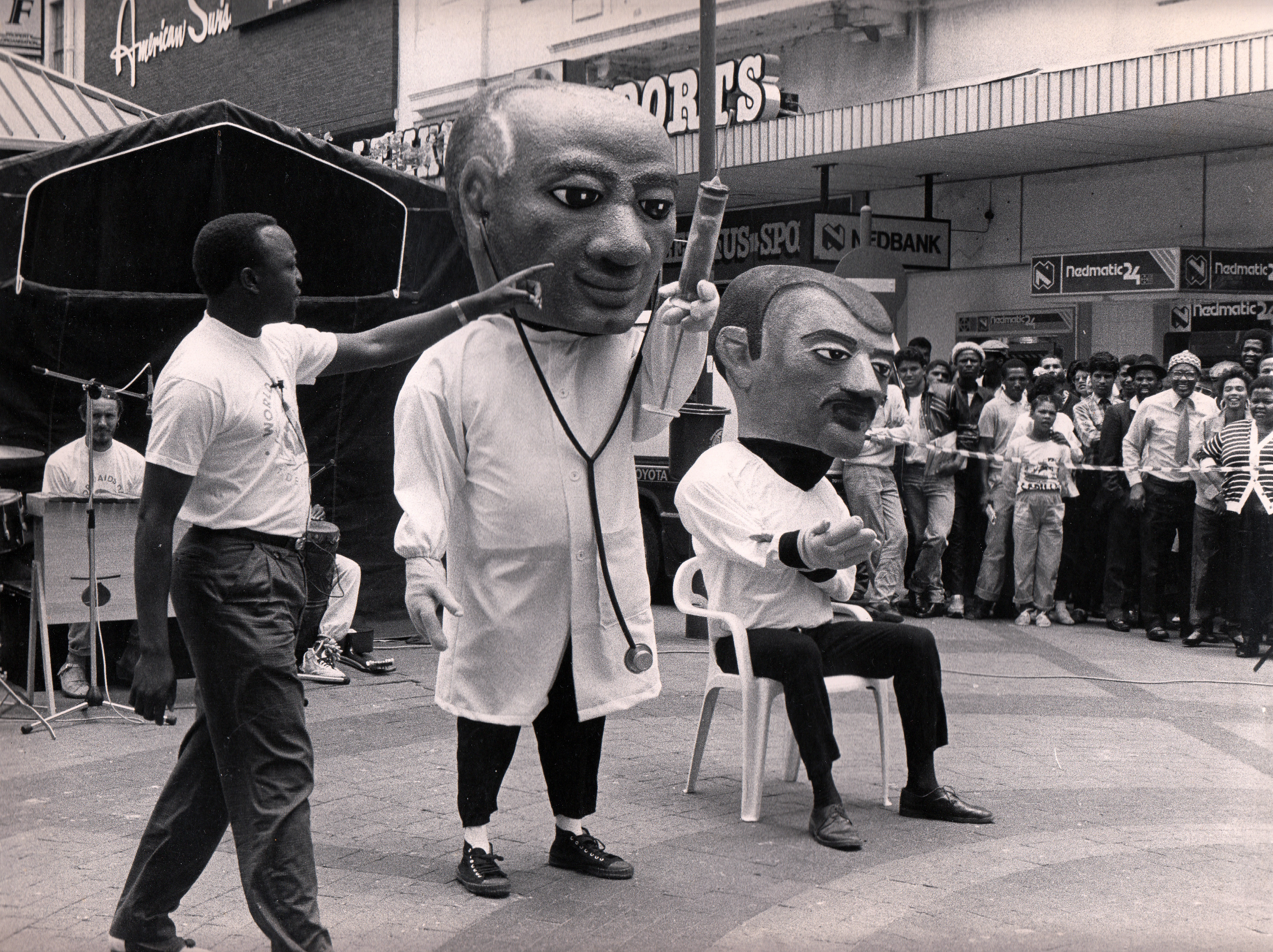
1980's, Cape Town, South Africa. World AIDS Day performance of Puppets Against AIDS.

== Puppetry for AIDS prevention ==
Puppets Against AIDS built on an African tradition of outdoor performances incorporating dance, percussion and interactive audience discussion with puppeteers who performed a scripted play. In contrast to fear-based government anti-AIDS campaigns depicting "skeletons" "demons" and "graveyards", Puppets Against AIDS embraced a creative light-hearted approach, with puppeteers taking the prevention message directly to the people—at shopping centers, mines, taxi stands and health clinics.

Undergirding the initiative was the belief that all South Africans, regardless of color or status, deserved access to health care, a philosophy that challenged the abuses and inequities under apartheid.

With little or no advance publicity, only marimba and drums to attract a village crowd, a Puppets Against AIDS narrator would introduce the 35-minute performance, which included six silent puppet characters and a narrator 'doctor' who provided information about HIV/AIDS transmission. The protagonist was a puppet named Jo who did not believe in using condoms while having sex with multiple partners outside of his marriage.

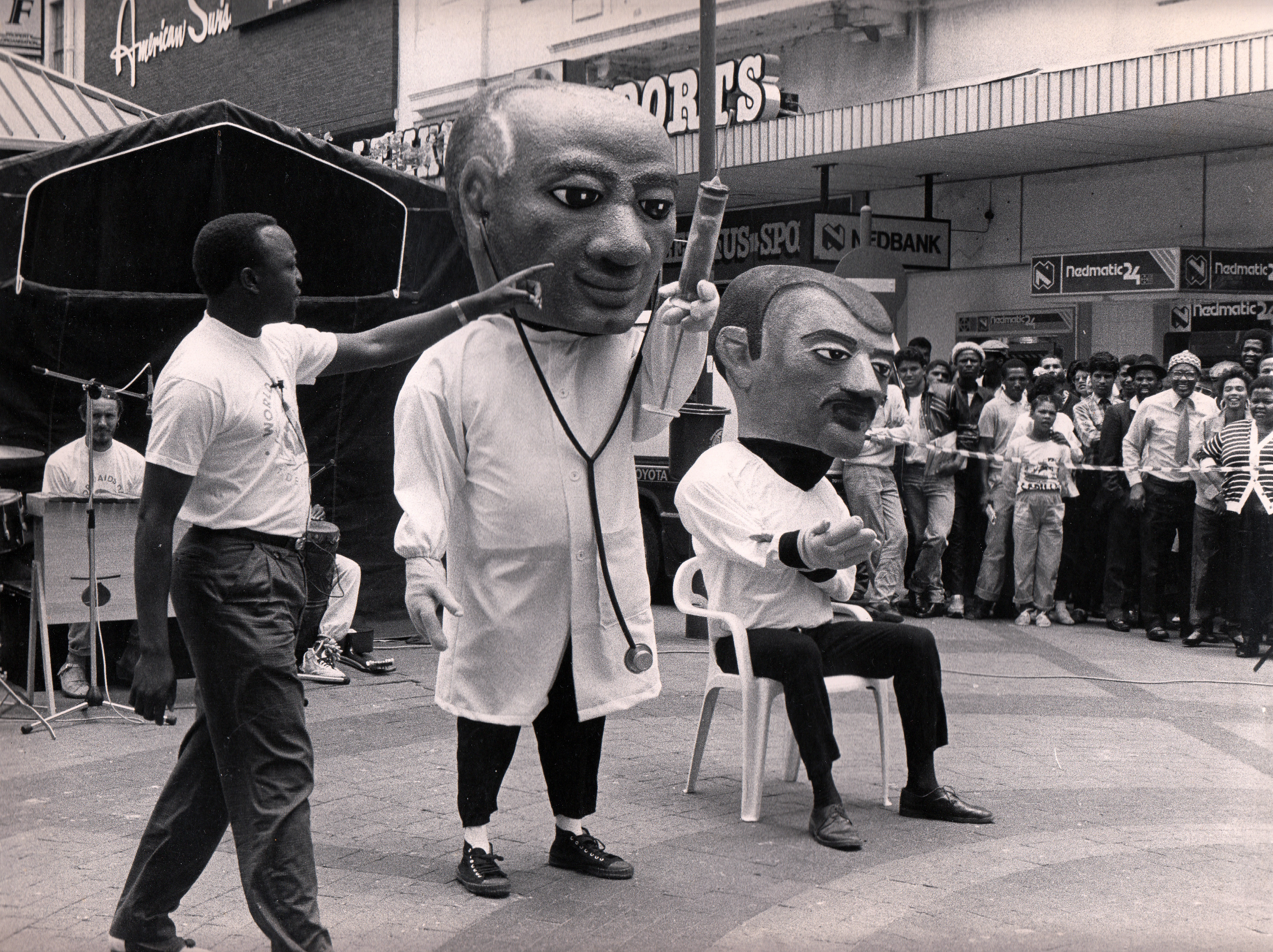
Cape Town, South Africa, 1980s. World AIDS Day Performance of Puppets Against AIDS.

Jo's behavior resulted in the transmission of HIV to his wife Mary, who in turn transmitted HIV to her unborn child. In the end, Joe's wife, along with a friend named Harry, took care of Jo while he suffered and ultimately died of AIDS. The puppets, some hand-held or glove puppets that popped out of a portable puppet booth, others life size and two meters high with giant heads worn on human bodies, featured gray faces that were racially unidentifiable in their playlets to prevent HIV/AIDS, a threat to public health in much of Africa where HIV/AIDS had been a long neglected problem.

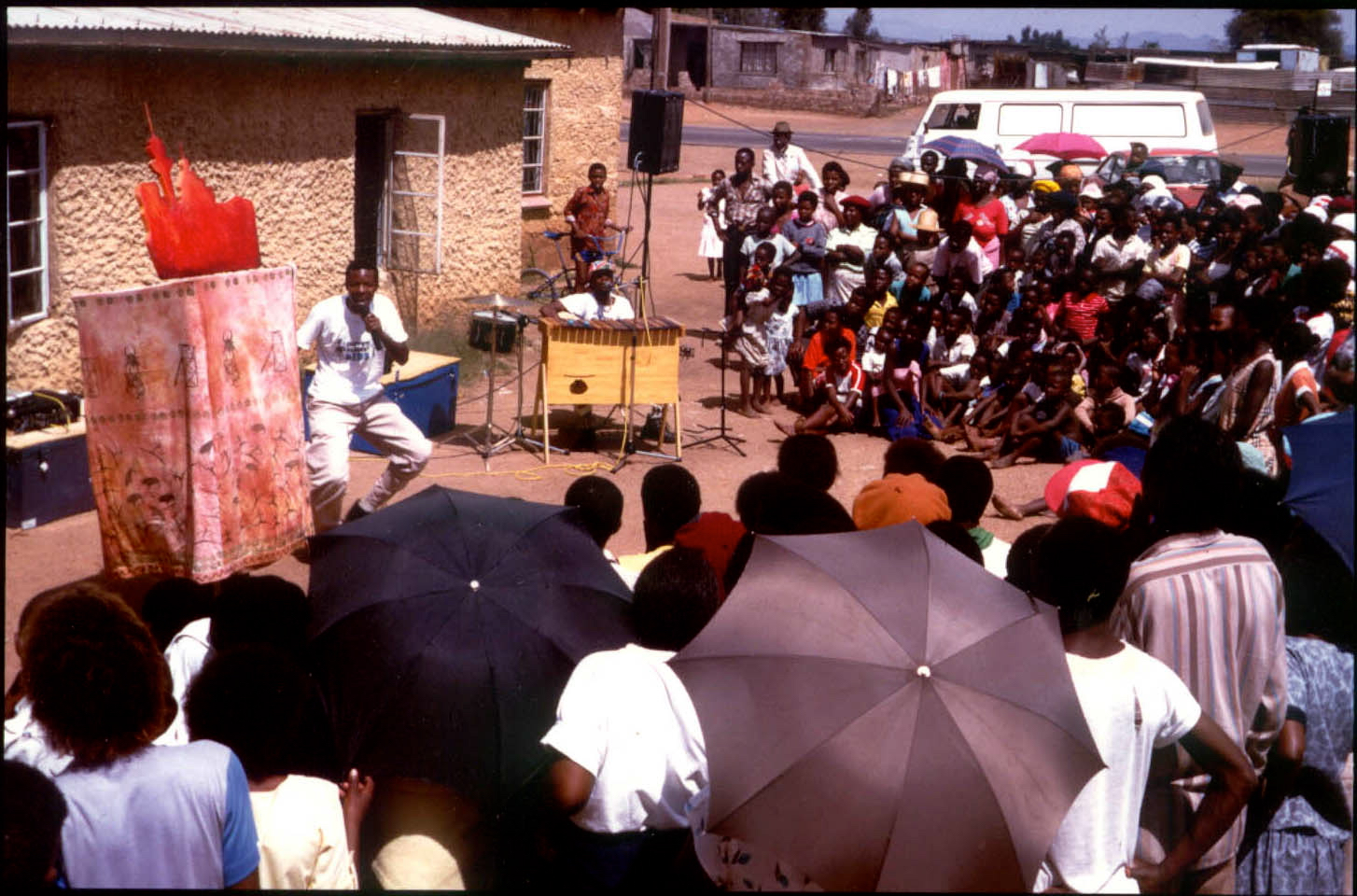
1980's, Cape Town. World AIDS Day. Puppets Against AIDS performance.

During the interactive performance in front of a largely illiterate audience, spectators were encouraged to become "spec actors" advising the puppet characters on their choices. Rather than merely disseminate information, Puppets Against AIDS director Gary Friedman encouraged audience members, who may have been reluctant to speak freely with health officials, to express their anxiety about HIV/AIDS through discussion of the playlet's plot and puppet characters. Professor and author Loren Kruger, in her book "The Drama of South Africa" refers to this process of reforming behavior through performance and interactive theater as "reformance" to increase social agency.

The puppets juxtaposing the real and imaginary also allowed for the creation of puppets who "represented identifiable human beings, but human beings ... not bounded to realities of race and culture."

In addition to interactive theater, Puppets Against AIDS conducted a condom demonstration with a mannequin, in which performers showed the audience members "how to put on a condom using a life size model." Free condoms were distributed.

Through humor, drumming and dance, the puppets encouraged discussion of two controversial subjects: sex and death. "Sex and death often being sensitive taboo issues, puppets were chosen as safe, non-threatening communicators for culturally diverse populations." Professor Marie Kruger, who studied the appeal of puppetry in African culture, referenced Puppets Against AIDS in her 2008 research paper. "It (the AIDS puppet show) creates an opportunity for people to laugh at themselves, even pity themselves for what they go through in their daily life ... challenging the audience to find solutions."

Puppetry workshops to spread the HIV/AIDS prevention message were held for 15 years in Africa, Canada, Australia and Europe.

== History ==
On December 1, 1988, to coincide with World AIDS Day in Johannesburg, South Africa, educator and puppeteer Gary Friedman launched Puppets Against AIDS. Prior to the launch of this street performance, Friedman studied puppetry for six years at the Institut International de la Marionnette in Charleville- Mézières, France, where he met his mentor Muppet creator Jim Henson, who provided the initial financing for the non-governmental African Research and Educational Puppetry Program, the sponsor of Puppets Against AIDS. Puppets Against AIDS, with an eventual 400 puppeteers, evolved at a time in South Africa when some Blacks reportedly viewed the apartheid government's condom campaign as "a political ruse to control population growth among Blacks".

AREPP also trained participants in field-work groups to design their own puppets and perform simple puppet shows.

The organization took its puppet show on the road to villages and towns in Zimbabwe, Zambia, Kenya, Botswana and Namibia. Friedman, the creator and initial director of Puppets Against AIDS, trained Kenyan puppeteers to spread the message of AIDS prevention to the poor and rural towns of Kenya, where residents seldom had access to television to learn fact from fiction.

Gary Friedman and later Brigid Schutz served as directors of Puppets Against AIDS.

== Puppets in Prison--Offshoot ==
In 1996, the South African Department of Justice and Correctional Services invited Gary Friedman and puppeteer Nyanga Tshabalala to launch an AIDS awareness program in South Africa's prisons, beginning with a pilot project in a medium security prison in Soweto, a township outside of Johannesburg. ‘Puppets in Prison’, was a program in which long term incarcerated youth created several puppet shows focused on rape, prostitution, sexual practices and sexually transmitted diseases in an effort to educate prisoners about HIV/AIDS transmission. After each show, the incarcerated performers received feedback from their peers to revise future performances. The Unesco Courier, in a feature on the program, reported in 1998 that puppets, one step removed from the real world, could overcome prison racial barriers through humor, tackling otherwise taboo subjects. In 1996, Puppets in Prison submitted a proposal to South Africa's Department of National Health to train 1,000 prisoners as HIV/AIDS performer-educators, who would then reach an additional 500,000 prisoners incarcerated in South Africa's correctional system. In its proposal, Puppets in Prison cited a 30% prison infection rate, ten times higher than the general population.

The Department of Corrections, after participating in the pilot program, failed to reach consensus to support funding the more ambitious prison-wide proposal.

In 2002, Friedman moved to Australia, where he has taught puppetry for television at the Sydney Film School, produced and directed documentary films and conducted puppetry workshops.

== Effectiveness and evaluation ==
The publication AIDS Care, a peer review medical journal that focuses on HIV/AIDS, reported in 1991 on a two-phase evaluation of Puppets Against AIDS for effectiveness in education. The first phase, an analysis of the video recording of the puppet show, concluded the play was "professional and comprehensive" in communicating its HIV/AIDS prevention message. The second phase, involving 21 live puppet performances in nine different places, assessed audience member beliefs and understandings before and after the series of live puppet shows. The evaluators determined the puppet theater, enjoyed by 97% of the audience, enhanced the audience members' knowledge of safe sex practices. "Improvements and positive changes were measured for respondents' self-perceived knowledge about AIDS, expressed concern about AIDS, perceptions of who can get AIDS, perceptions of who will not get AIDS, knowledge of the healthy carrier state, knowledge of modes of transmission, perceived fatality of AIDS, and knowledge of protective behavior." Evaluators concluded, however, that Puppets Against AIDS could be even more effective if it were "incorporated into existing community-based education programmes on HIV infection."

In 1995 a group of medical and social science researchers conducted a qualitative evaluation of the AREPP's Puppetry Against AIDS Program. The purpose of the evaluation was to provide funders of the puppet theater with an independent assessment by examining the impact of the performance on the audience. Although the researchers noted a need to include puppeteers who were HIV positive, as well as ever-evolving script changes to improve the portrayal of women and better address modern misconceptions about HIV/AIDS, researchers also noted Puppets Against AIDS was "reaching into the heart of the populace" and making connections with the target audience, delivering a much-needed message about the importance of wearing condoms to prevent the spread of HIV/AIDS. Researchers urged further evaluation of the program's effectiveness.

In "Evaluation of the Role of Theater in Disseminating Information about the Scourge of HIV/AIDS in South Africa," University of Fort Hare, South Africa professors Chijioke Uwah and Elias Mathipa noted the positive participatory nature of AREPP's puppet shows, in which audience members constructed and negotiated meaning, but suggested that anti-AIDS intervention programs, in general, be designed through a cultural lens with greater emphasis on cultural norms and structural realities, such as lack of food, clothing and shelter, to work in concert with non-governmental organizations (NGO's) in addressing these realities.

== Kenya Institute of Puppet Theatre ==
In 1994, upon the invitation of Dr. Eric Krystall of Nairobi, Gary Friedman, the creator of Puppets Against AIDS, led a group of South African puppeteers to Kenya to train local performers in the use of puppetry to combat HIV/AIDS. The Community Health Awareness Puppeteers (CHAP), the group that emerged from the training, managed its own "Puppets Against AIDS" program in Nairobi, where it later, in 2007, rebranded itself as the Kenya Institute of Puppet Theatre (KIPT). A non-profit non-governmental agency, KIPT incorporates interactive audience discourse in its puppet shows and festivals that tackle themes such as the prevention of HIV/AIDS, sexual reproductive health/rights, gender-based violence, environment and conservation, and human rights and democracy. In addition to performances, KIPT sponsors puppetry training and folk media workshops, launching puppetry projects in other parts of Africa, including Nigeria, Southern Sudan, Eritrea, Uganda and Liberia.
