= National Museum of Photography (Denmark) =

Museum in Copenhagen

Coordinates: 55°40′31″N 12°34′50″E

- Nationale Fotomuseum
- Established: 1996
- Location: Copenhagen, Denmark
- Collection size: 100,000
- Founder: Sigfred Løvstad
- Executive director: Henrik Andersen
- Patron: Prince Joachim (2000-2018)
- Director: Keld Nielsen

The National Museum of Photography (Danish: Nationale Fotomuseum) is a photography museum in Denmark that was located in the Black Diamond, a modern waterfront extension to the Royal Danish Library in Copenhagen, until 2017 whereafter it closed due to funding shortages.

== History ==
The National Museum of Photography, founded in 1996, moved into its current premises when the Black Diamond was completed in 1999. However, the museum is based on the Royal Library's collections.

Since the invention of photography in 1839, photographs have been included in The Royal Library's collections. The first items in the collection were photographs pasted into printed books. Later a collection of individual photographs emerged through donations and acquisitions. In 1902, the collection was incorporated into the then newly established Department of Maps and Pictures. From the beginning of the 1950s, efforts to build a comprehensive photographic collection were intensified and the collection grew tremendously under the direction of Bjørn Ochner, Denmark's first photo-historian. Today the Royal Library's collection contains around 18 million photographs.

Photographs which are either of special historic or artistic importance now form the basis of the museum.

== Collections ==
The museum's collections, consisting of around 100,000 photographs, cover Danish and international photography from its invention in 1839 to the present day. Pioneering photography from the 19th century is particularly well represented. The collection of daguerreotypes is the largest in Scandinavia.

== Exhibitions ==
The museum's exhibitions are generally based on its collection which is frequently supplemented with loans from artists or other institutions. Exhibitions can be based on a theme, a genre, a place, a specific photographer or else aspects of the collection are highlighted via loans from artists or institutions at home and abroad.

== See also ==
- Photography in Denmark
