= Omar Badsha =

South African artist and activist (born 1945)

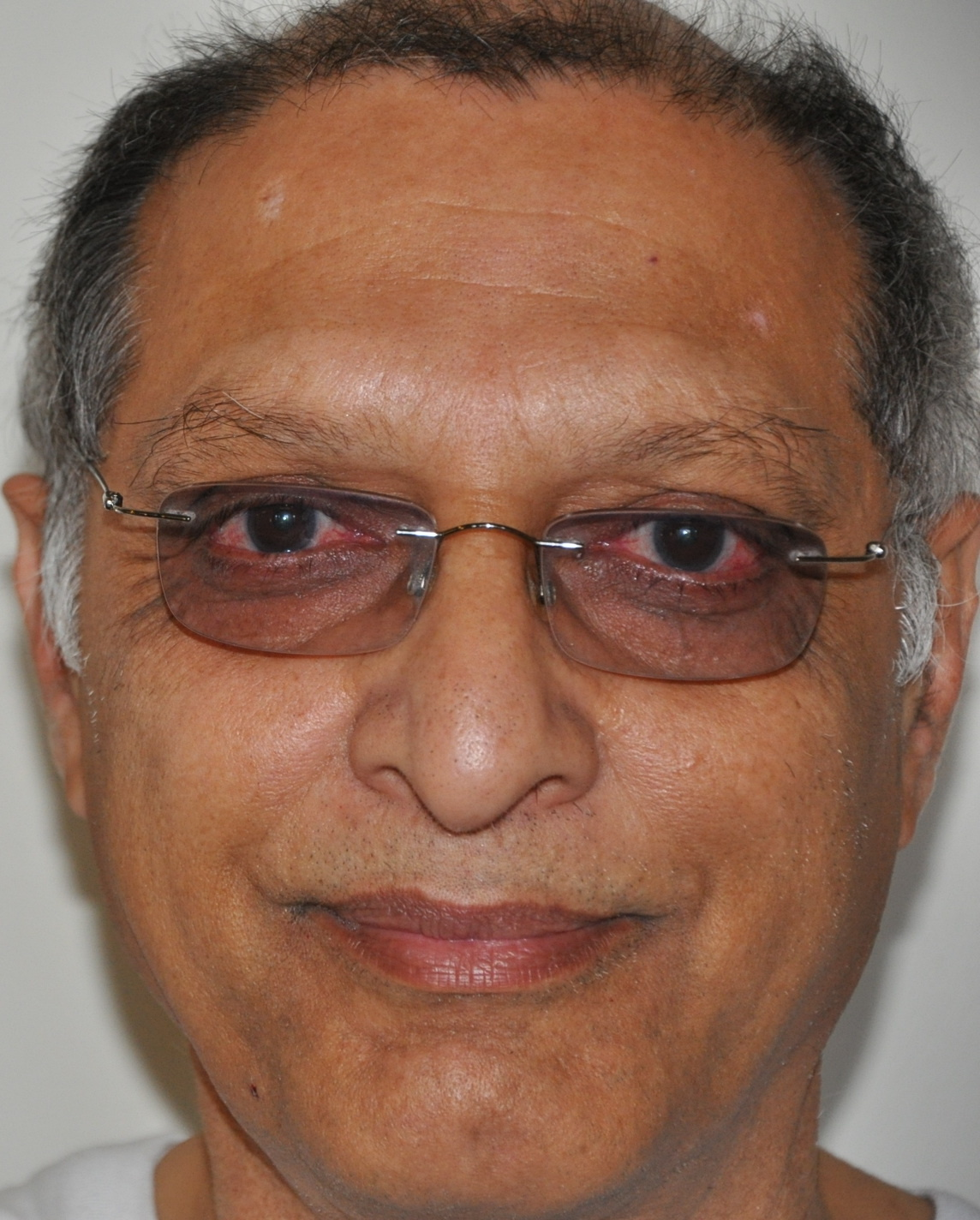
- Born: 27 June 1945 (age 81); South Africa
- Occupation: Photographer
- Awards: Order of Ikhamanga

Omar Badsha (born 27 June 1945) is a South African documentary photographer, artist, political and trade union activist and historian. He is a self-taught artist. He has exhibited his art in South Africa and internationally. In 2015, he won the Arts & Culture Trust (ACT) Lifetime Achievement Award for Visual Art. In 2017, he received an honorary doctorate Doctor of Philosophy (DPhil), for his work in the field of documentary photography in South Africa. He was also awarded a Presidential honor The Order of Ikhamanga in Silver for "His commitment to the preservation of our country's history through ground-breaking and well-balanced research, and collection of profiles and events of the struggle for liberation."

== Early life ==
Badsha was born in Durban, KwaZulu-Natal on 27 June 1945. He is a third-generation South African of Indian origin and comes from a Gujarati Muslim Sunni Bohra family. His father Ebrahim Badsha was one of the South African pioneer black artists and a founding member of the Bantu, Indian, Coloured Arts (BICA) organisation started by Durban artists in 1951. His artistry was impacted by his father's zest for Arabic calligraphy, the artwork of Cecil Skotnes and later, in life by the work of Dumile Feni.

== Contributions ==
In the early 1960s, Badsha produced "resistance art" and won a number of awards including Sir Basil Schonland prize in 1965 and the Oppenheimer award in 1969 after his work was featured in the Johannesburg exhibition Artists of Fame and Promise. Badsha's art has featured in many exhibitions in 1970, his first solo exhibition was held at the Artists Gallery in Cape Town. He became an anti-apartheid activist during his high schools days. He was one of the activists who revived the Natal Indian Congress in the 1970s and the independent left-wing trade union movement that grew out of the famous 1973 Durban strikes. Badsha established and was the first secretary of the Chemical Workers Industrial Union. During this time he was detained and harassed. He was denied a passport and never allowed to travel outside the country until 1990.

In 1982, Badsha cofounded the multiracial organization Afrapix. They took photojournalistic photographs of effects and impact of apartheid with the aim to create a picture library and "stimulate documentary photography". In 1987, helped establish The University of Cape Town's Centre for documentary photography. Badsha was the head of the photography unit of the Second Carnegie Commission on Poverty and. Development. The study sought to revise the outcomes of the first Corporation study by commissioning more research into poverty in South Africa which would focus on both Black and White South Africans. An exhibition of the photographs included in the Second Carnegie Commission on Poverty and Development study was held at The University of Cape Town. Badsha could not attend the opening of the exhibition as he was detained. The exhibition was later held throughout the United States and it became a book entitled South Africa: The Cordoned Heart. He is also the founder of South African History Online SAHO, which he founded in 1999 it is South Africa's largest history website. Badsha runs SAHO and in 2009 the website won the South African NGO Coalition's NGO Web Awards in the category of Best Use of Social Web.

He is the author of a number of photographic books. His first book co-authored with Fatima Meer was A Letter to Farzanah. It was published by the Institute for Black Research, at the University of Natal. The book was banned immediately after its publication in 1979. It was based on a letter to his daughter Farzanah. The book features 67 photographs of Black children living in apartheid South Africa along with key newspaper articles. His book Imijondolo: A Photographic Essay on Forced Removals in the Inanda District of South Africa was published in 1985 The book was inspired by his work as a local social change agent in the Inanda informal settlement located outside of Durban, South Africa.
