= Bodibe, South Africa =

Bodibe
- Town
- Location within South Africa
- Coordinates: 26.05°S 25.83°E
- Country: South Africa

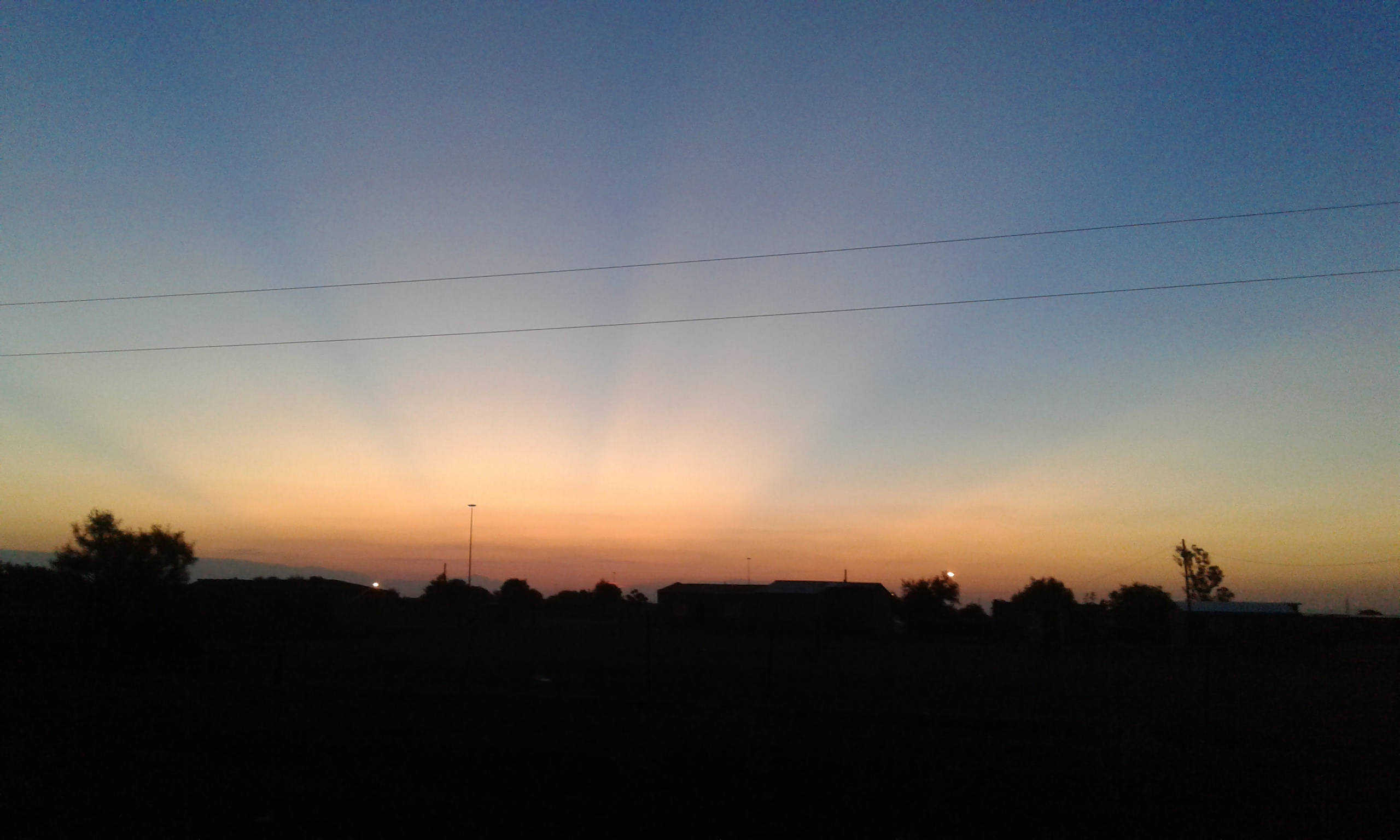
Sunset in Bodibe.

Bodibe is a large town along National Road R503 in South Africa.

== See also ==
- Economy of South Africa
- History of South Africa
