= Cedric Nunn =

South African photographer and educator (born 1957)

- Born: 1957 (age 68–69); Nongoma, KwaZulu
- Citizenship: South Africa
- Occupation: Photographer
- Awards: First National Bank
- Website: cedricnunn.co.za

Cedric Nunn (born 1957) is a South African photographer and educator.

He is known for his photography depicting South Africa before and after the end of apartheid.

== Early life and education ==
Nunn was born into a mixed-race family in Nongoma, KwaZulu, in 1957. He was raised in Hluhluwe, Mangete and Baynesfield.

He attended school in Ixopo, KwaZulu-Natal, up until standard eighth (Grade 10), when he was fifteen.

== Career ==
Nunn moved to Johannesburg in 1982 and began working as a professional photographer at the age of 25. He became one of the prominent photographers to document apartheid resistance in the 1980s.

He went on to co-found Afrapix, a photographic collective that supplied newspapers outside South Africa with images of apartheid, with Paul Weinberg, Peter Mackenzie and Omar Badsha.

He served as the director for Market Photo Workshop, a photography school, gallery, and project space in Johannesburg, from 1998 to 2000. Nunn was also a member of the national executive of the Professional Photographers of South Africa (PPSA).

Nunn has worked for many nonprofits, newspapers, wire agencies, public-relations companies, and magazines.

He has taught at the Tisch School of the Arts at New York University in New York City; the University of the Witwatersrand Wits School of Arts in Johannesburg; and The School for International Training.

== Publications ==
In 2012, Nunn published the photography book Cedric Nunn: Call and Response. The book accompanied an exhibition of the same name that opened in Mozambique, New York City, and various galleries in South Africa and Germany.

== Awards ==
- 2011: First National Bank Johannesburg Art Fair Award.

== Exhibitions ==
- 1983 Nichts Wird Uns Trennen (Germany) Group.
- 1984 Bosmont (Johannesburg, South Africa) Solo.
- 1984 Women at Work (Johannesburg, South Africa) Group.
- 1985 South Africa: The Cordoned Heart (USA & South Africa) Group.
- 1987 Stop the Killings (University of Durban Westville, South Africa) Solo.
- 1987 History Workshop. Wits University. Johannesburg. South Africa. Group.
- 1988 Children (Johannesburg, South Africa) Group.
- 1988. Ten Years of Staffrider (Market Photography Gallery, South Africa) Group.
- 1989 Beyond the Barricades (Market Photography Gallery, South Africa) Group.
- 1989 Culture for Another South Africa (Amsterdam, Holland) Group.
- 1989 Health (South Africa & Germany) Group.
- 1990 Zabalaza (London, United Kingdom) Group.
- 1994 This Land is Our Land (Bloemfontein, South Africa) Group.
- 1995 The Hidden Years (KwaMuhle Museum, Durban, South Africa) Solo.
- 1995 Black Looks, White Myths (1st Johannesburg Biennale, South Africa) Group.
- 1996 Colours (Berlin, Germany) Group.
- 1997. Malhawu, Macufe Arts Festival (Bloemfontein, South Africa) Solo.
- 1997 NGO Coalition (Johannesburg, South Africa) Group.
- 1997 Blood Relatives (Playhouse, Durban, South Africa) Solo.
- 1997 South African National Gallery Contemporary Collection (Cape Town, South Africa) Group.
- 1998 3rd Festival of African Photography (Bamako, Mali) Group.
- 1998 Democracy's Images, Bildmuseet (Umea, Sweden) Group.
- 1998 National Development Agency, Workers Library (Johannesburg, South Africa) Group.
- 1999 Democracies Images (Johannesburg Art Gallery) Group.
- 1999 Lines of Sight, The South African National Gallery (Cape Town. South Africa) Curated the exhibition "Photographs Denied"
- 1999 Workers, The Workers Library & Museum (Johannesburg, South Africa) Group.
- 2000 Every Child Is My Child, African Window Museum (Pretoria, South Africa) Group.
- 2000 Capitals, Espace Matisse (Lille, France) Group.
- 2000 Living In A Strange Land (Parliament, Cape Town) Group.
- 2000 Emotions and Relations (Sandton Civic Gallery) Group.
- 2002 Group Portraits, Nine South African Families, Tropen Museum (Amsterdam, Netherlands)
- Bamako, Maison's Descartes. Amsterdam Photography Biennale (Amsterdam, Netherlands)
- 2002 Group Portraits, Nine South African Families (Tropen Museum, Amsterdam, Netherlands)
- 2004 Fatherhood Project (Johannesburg, South Africa)
- 2005 Blood Relatives (Constitution Hill, Johannesburg) Solo.
- 2007 Then and Now (Rhodes University, Durban Art Gallery) Group.
- 2009 In Camera (Wits University, Johannesburg) Solo.
- 2012 Rise and Fall of Apartheid, International Center for Photography (New York) Group.
- 2012 Cedric Nunn: Call and Response (International) Solo.
- 2013 Cedric Nunn, Call and Response (international) Solo
- 2014 US Museum Stellenbosch with Seippel Gallery, Unsettled
- 2014 Albany Museum, Fort Selwyn, Grahamstown, Unsettled
- 2015 Cedric Nunn: UNSETTLED at UNISA Art Gallery, Pretora; Wits Art Museum, Johannesburg; KZNSA - KwaZulu Natal Society of Arts; Galerie Seippel, Cologne, Germany; David Krut Projects, New York, NY, USA; Landesmuseum Hannover. Solo
- 2016 Cedric Nunn: UNSETTLED at Iwalewa-Haus Bayreuth, Germany. Solo

== Photography essays ==
The following are photographic essays by Nunn.

- Blood Relatives – an essay begun in the early 1980s documenting the struggle against apartheid
- Cuito Cuanavale – an essay on the site of a military battle in the late 1980s that brought about profound change in South Africa's political landscape
- Farm Workers – an essay documenting farm workers in South Africa's rural areas
- Hidden Years – a photographic essay included in Nunn's first solo exhibition at the KwaMuhle Museum in Durban in 1996; the photographs were all taken in the Natal, Nunn's birthplace
- In Camera – photographs from post-apartheid South Africa, created in collaboration with the Apartheid Archive Study project
- Jazz – an essay of jazz musicians
- Johannesburg – photographs taken in 2000 during the height of transformation in Johannesburg
- Rural Development – an essay documenting rural life under democracy
- SANPAD – a series of portraits of young parents in South Africa (part of an academic study)
- Struggle – photographs documenting South Africa's transition from apartheid to democracy
- Then and Now – a project where eight South African photographers contributed photographs from before and after the end of apartheid
