= Santu Mofokeng =

South African photographer (1956–2020)

- Born: October 19, 1956; Johannesburg, South Africa
- Died: January 26, 2020 (aged 63); Johannesburg, South Africa
- Occupation: Photographer
- Awards: Prince Claus Award

Santu Mofokeng (October 19, 1956 – January 26, 2020) was a South African news and documentary photographer who worked under the alias Mofokengâ. Mofokeng was a member of the Afrapix collective and won a Prince Claus Award.

== Early life ==
Mofokeng was born on October 19, 1956, in Johannesburg, South Africa.

== Career ==
While still a teenager, he began his career as a street photographer, went on to work as an assistant in a darkroom, and then worked as a news photographer. Subsequently, he joined the collective Afrapix, working under the alias Mofokengâ. Initially he mainly documented the struggle against apartheid in South Africa.

In 1988 he started working with the African Studies Institute at the University of the Witwatersrand (Wits), where he worked alongside Revisionist Charles Van Onselen. Mofokeng's writing improved significantly during his time at the university. He spent much of the next 10 years collecting photographs of South Africa's middle class. While at Wits, Mofokeng realized the importance of answering even the simplest of questions in photography, questions like “What are you doing?” and “Is this what you mean?”. This process helped Mofokeng transform the way he looked at photography and find the true meaning of each photo he took.

Mofokeng emphasized the spiritual dimension of his work, as in the series Chasing Shadows from 1997. After starting off with street and news photography, he specialized in landscapes. Later projects show his deep concern for the condition of the (biophysical) environment at the beginning of the 21st century.

At his exhibition Let's Talk in 2010, he explained that the essence is not what you see in these photographs, but what you don't see (but feel).

On January 26, 2020, Mofokeng died of progressive supranuclear palsy, a degenerative brain disease, in Johannesburg.

== Solo exhibitions ==
- 1990: Like Shifting Sand, Market Galleries, Johannesburg
- 1994: Rumours / The Bloemhof Portfolio, Market Galleries, Johannesburg
- 1995: Distorting Mirror/Townships Imagined, Worker's Library, Johannesburg
- 1997: Chasing Shadows – Gertrude Posel Gallery, University of the Witwatersrand, Johannesburg
- 1998: Black Photo Album/Look at Me, Netherlands Photo Institute, Rotterdam
- 1998: Chasing Shadows, Netherlands Photo Institute, Rotterdam
- 1998: Lunarscapes, Netherlands Photo Institute, Rotterdam
- 1999: Black Photo Album/Look at Me, FNAC Montparnasse
- 2000: Chasing Shadows, Transparencies International, Berlin
- 2000: Sad Landscapes, Camouflage Gallery, Johannesburg
- 2003: Chasing Shadows, Memling Museum, Bruges
- 2004: Rethinking Landscape, Centre photographique d'Ile-de-France (CPIF), Pontault-Combault
- 2004: Santu Mofokeng, David Krut Projects, New York City
- 2006: Invoice Iziko, South African National Art Museum, Cape Town
- 2007: Invoice, Standard Bank Art Museum, Johannesburg
- 2008: Homeland Security, Johannesburg Art Museum
- 2008: Santu Mofokeng's Landscape, Warren Siebrits, Johannesburg
- 2009: Mofokeng survey exhibition, Autograph ABP, London
- 2010: Chasing Shadows, Anne Arbor Institute of Humanities, Michigan
- 2010: Let's Talk, Arts on Main, Johannesburg
- 2010: Remaining Past, Minshar Art Institute, Tel Aviv
- 2011–12: Chasing Shadows, Paris, Bern, Bergen, Antwerp

== Awards ==
- 1991: Ernest Cole Scholarship, for study at the International Center of Photography, in New York City
- 1992: 1st Mother Jones Award for Africa
- 1998: Künstlerhaus Worpswede Fellowship, Germany
- 1999: Contre Jour Residency, Marseille
- 1999: DAAD Fellowship, Worpswede, Germany
- 2001: DAAD Fellowship, Worpswede, Germany
- 2007: Ruth First Fellowship
- 2009: Prince Claus Award, Netherlands
- 2016: International Photography Prize, Fondazione Fotografia Modena – Sky Arte, Italy
