= Guy Tillim =

South African photographer (born 1962)

- Born: 1962 (age 63–64); Johannesburg
- Citizenship: South Africa
- Education: University of Cape Town
- Occupation: Photographer

Guy Tillim (born 1962) is a South African photographer known for his work focusing on troubled regions of Sub-Saharan Africa. A member of the country's white minority, Tillim was born in Johannesburg in 1962. He graduated from the University of Cape Town in 1983, and he also spent time at the Market Photo Workshop in Johannesburg. His photographs and projects have been exhibited internationally and form the basis of several of Tillim's published books.

The website African Success has described him as one of South Africa's "foremost photographers", whilst the Daily Maverick site has referred to him as "arguably SA's finest photographer" after David Goldblatt.

== Early career ==
Tillim first became professionally involved in photography as a photojournalist in 1986. Until 1990, he worked with the Afrapix collective, a group of South African documentary photographers providing a unique conduit of photography to world media during apartheid, alongside other prominent figures in South African photography, including David Goldblatt, Steve Hilton-Barber, and Omar Badsha. During much of this time, he worked as a freelance photographer for both local and foreign media, including Reuters (1986 to 1988) and Agence France Press (1993 to 1994).

His work during this period was hugely focused on the hostile political climate during Apartheid in South Africa. The photojournalists of the era, many of whom also worked with the Afrapix collective, were photographing often violent scenes of riots, war, and poverty on the black citizens of South Africa.

== Post-Apartheid Work ==
After the Afrapix collective dissolved in 1991 and apartheid was politically resolved in 1994, Tillim's work shifted to document the lasting effects of South Africa's almost 50 year-long war on its black citizens. Many of his most significant bodies of work carry this theme, such as Johannesburg (May, 2005) and Jo'burg Downtown, which include photographs of scenes and dwellers of the city. Of the latter, Johannesburg museum curator Okwui Enwezor said that "as a series, Jo'burg represents a practice of post-apartheid documentary photography that links contemporary South Africa to its own history." In other work, such as Things as They Seem (2004), he focuses on the architecture of the city, saying in an interview that "these photos were taken in places I knew, places where I had worked and covered news events." He stated that he "had always wanted to return and try to find it, try to describe it in some way." These works and others stood out in the global discussion of South African political climate.

In more recent years, Tillim's work has shifted from the themes of his career from the 80s to the early 2000s. In 2014, he participated in a collaborative exhibit at the Museum für Moderne Kunst entitled The Divine Comedy: Heaven, Hell, Purgatory revisited by Contemporary African Artists. In contrast to his earlier work, it reexamines Dante Alighieri's poem through art.

== Publications ==
- Jo'burg. Johannesburg: STE Publishers, 2001. ISBN 978-2350460147. Photographs taken in and around Johannesburg.
- Departure. Cape Town and Johannesburg: Michael Stevenson Contemporary, 2003.
- Kunhinga Portraits. Cape Town and Johannesburg: Michael Stevenson Contemporary, 2003. Photographs taken in the town of Kunhinga, Bié Province, Angola, featuring portraits of displaced Angolans fleeing government forces in February 2002, during the final months of the Angolan Civil War.
- Leopold and Mobuto. Filigranes Editions, 2004. ISBN 978-2914381918.
- Petros Village. Rome: Punctum, 2006. Photographs documenting daily life over a two-week period in the village of Petros, central Malawi.
- Congo Democratic. Renate Wiehager; Cape Town and Johannesburg: Michael Stevenson; Rome: Galleria Extraspazio, 2006. A photojournal of the events surrounding the contested presidential election held in the Democratic Republic of the Congo in July 2006, during which supporters of the incumbent Joseph Kabila clashed with those of Etinenne Tshisikedi.
- Avenue Patrice Lumumba. Prestel, 2008. ISBN 978-3791340661. Photographs taken in Mozambique, DR Congo, Madagascar, Angola and Benin during 2007/8. With introductions by both Tillim and Robert Gardner.
- Roma, Città di Mezzo. Rome: Punctum, 2009. ISBN 978-8895410296. Photographs taken in and around the capital city of Rome in Italy, originally commissioned for the international Roman photography festival, FotoGrafia.
- Second Nature. Prestel, 2012. ISBN 978-3791346908.
- O Futuro Certo. Göttingen: Steidl; The Walther Collection, 2015. ISBN 978-3-86930-649-0. Selections from Tillim's various publications of the previous decade, including Mai Mai Militia in Training, Jo'burg, Avenue Patrice Lumumba, and Second Nature.
- Edit Beijing. Paris: Bessard, 2017. Photographs of people on the streets of Beijing made over a two-week period. Edition of 500 copies.

== Awards ==
- 2002: Prix SCAM (Societe Civile des Auteurs Multimedia) Roger Pic.
- 2003: Higashikawa Overseas Photographer Award, Japan.
- 2004: Daimler-Chrysler Award for South African photography.
- 2005: Leica Oskar Barnack Award for his Jo'burg series.
- Robert Gardner Fellowship in Photography by the Peabody Museum of Archaeology and Ethnology at Harvard University.

== Exhibitions ==
- 2006: SLUM: Art and life in the here and now of the civil age, Neue Galerie in Graz, Austria
- 2006: São Paulo Art Biennial
- 2007: Included in FotoGrafia, Rome's International Festival in the group exhibition Non Tutte Le Strade Portano a Roma, Ex Gil (Note: Links in this quotation have been added for this encyclopedia entry)
- 2007: Goodman Gallery, Johannesburg
- 2007: Congo Democratic, Extraspazio, Rome
- 2007: Africa Remix, Johannesburg Art Gallery
- 2007: Photography, Video, Mixed Media III, DaimlerChrysler Gallery, Berlin
- 2012: Second Nature, Huis Marseille Museum for Photography, Amsterdam
- 2014: The Divine Comedy. Heaven, Purgatory and Hell Revisited by Contemporary African Artists, curated by Simon Njami

== Bibliography ==
- Maltz-Leca, Leora (1 September 2011). "On Street Names and 'De Facto Monuments': Guy Tillim's Avenue Patrice Lumumba". ArteEast. Archived from the original on 25 January 2012.
- Poplak, Richard (18 May 2011). "Floating worlds: SA photographer relocates the African modern". Daily Maverick.
- "Biography of Guy Tillim". African Success. 22 July 2007. Archived from the original on 4 October 2017.
- "Stevenson: Guy Tillim". Stevenson Gallery. 2011.
